= Our Lady of Charity =

Title of the Virgin Mary

Our Lady of Charity (Latin: Nostra Domina Charitatis) is a celebrated Marian title of the Blessed Virgin Mary venerated in many Catholic countries.

Various images of Our Lady of Charity are found in Cuba, France, Italy, Mexico, the Philippines, Malta, Spain and the United States of America.

== Cuba ==
According to the General Archive of the Indies, the arrival of the image of the Virgin of Charity to the mountains of the Sierra del Cobre, in Cuba, took place when an Illescan, Francisco Sánchez de Moya, captain of artillery, received on 3 May 1597 a mandate from King Philip II of Spain to go to the mines of the Sierra del Cobre to defend those coasts from the attacks of English pirates.

King Charles IV of Spain issued a decree on 19 May 1801 that Cuban slaves were to be freed from the El Cobre copper mines. The story circulated around the island quickly. Many felt that the Virgin purposely chose to have her sanctuary in El Cobre because it is located in Oriente Province. Later folk legends associated the taking of copper materials to their homes after having it blessed near the Virgin's sanctified image as a form of souvenir and miraculous healing.

Pope Pius XI granted a canonical coronation for the image on 20 December 1936. Pope Paul VI raised the shrine to the status of Minor Basilica on 22 December 1977. The feast day of the image is commemorated on September 8; the birthday and Nativity of the Virgin Mary.

=== Description of the image ===
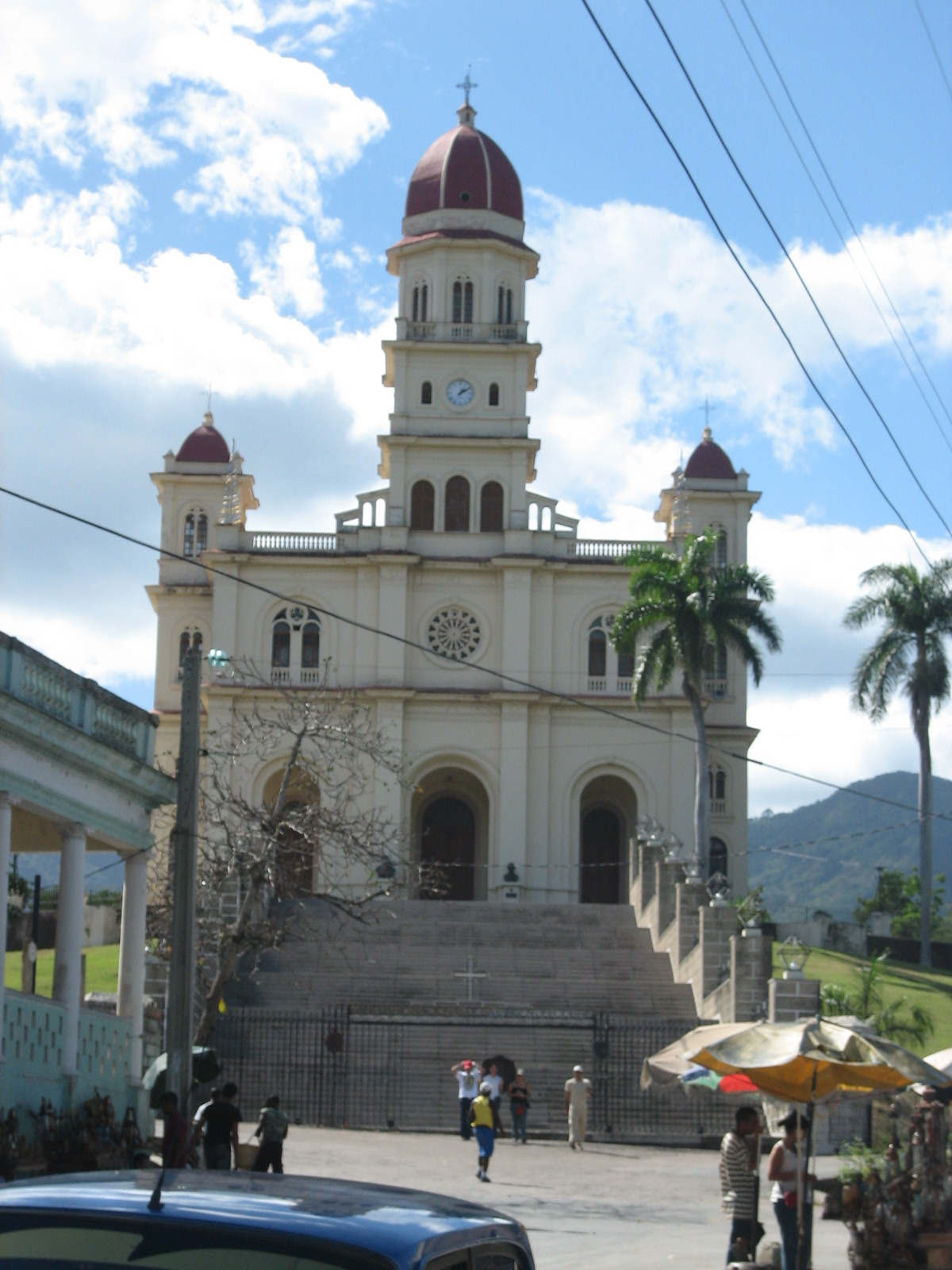
The Minor Basilica of Our Lady of Charity of El Cobre, built in 1926

The Cuban statue venerated measures about 16 inches tall; the head is made of baked clay covered with a polished coat of fine white powder. Her feet rest on a brilliant moon, while angels spread their golden wings on a silver cloud. The Child Jesus raises his right hand as in a blessing, and in his left hand he holds a golden globe. A popular image of Our Lady of Charity includes a banner above her head with the Latin phrase "Mater Caritatis Fluctibus Maris Ambulavit" (English: Mother of Charity who walked on the road of stormy seas). Originally, the robes on the image were white in color. Newer robes are embroidered with gold and silver, which includes the national shield of Cuba. Among Cuban religious devotees, the image is given the affectionate title of La Cachita.

The Pontifical crown was designed by the gay male designer Juan Hernandez y Giro and the jewels were sourced by Mr. Julius Raices from the Italian jewelry company The Star of Italy based in Compostela, Havana.

The statue stands on a pedestal behind glass above the altar in the El Cobre basilica. The color yellow is associated with the Virgin of Charity, and her shrines are often filled with yellow flowers.

A chapel of Our Lady of Charity exists within the Basilica of the National Shrine of the Immaculate Conception in Washington, D.C.

=== Pontifical approbations ===
Our Lady of Charity del Cobre; Queen and Patroness of Cuban peoples
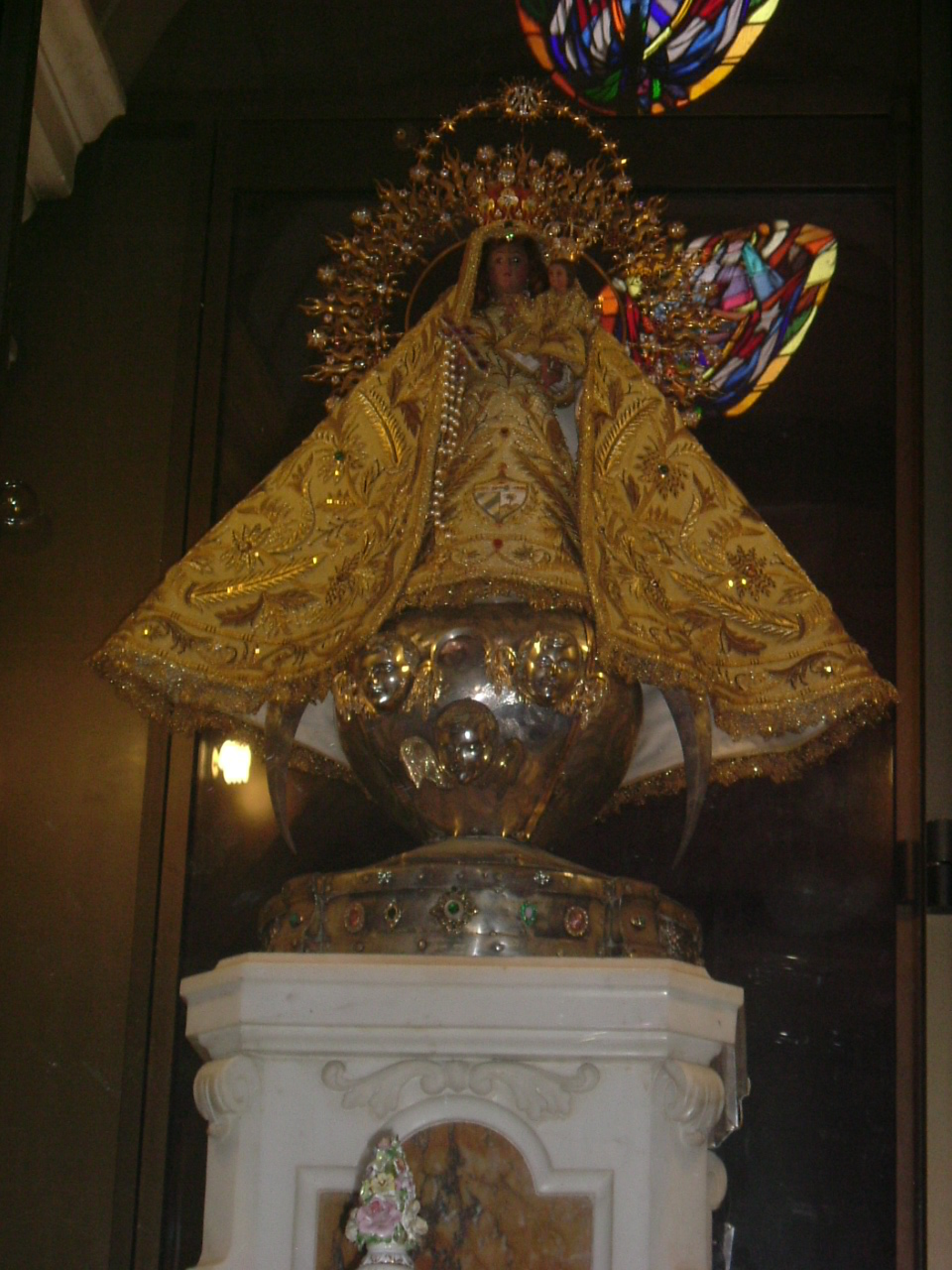
- The present image enshrined in the Minor Basilica of Nuestra Señora Caridad del Cobre

Our Lady of Charity, Mother and Patroness of Cuba, La Cachita
- Venerated in: Catholic Church
- Major shrine: Basilica del Cobre, Cuba
- Feast: September 8, Feast of Nativity of the Blessed Virgin Mary
- Attributes: The Blessed Virgin Mary carrying the Christ child and holding a crucifix atop an inverted crescent moon, with triple cherubs, encrusted with jewels and golden crown and aureole halo, embroidered gold mantle with the Cuban flag
- Patronage: Cuba, Cuban peoples, salt and copper miners
- Controversy: Cuban and slave independence, tolerance towards mixed Mulatto races

The first President of Cuba, Carlos Manuel de Céspedes presented the Cuban banner to the image along with his soldiers who wore a similar medal while Cuban general Calixto García bowed at the image during a Holy Mass in honor of Mambises resistance. Our Lady of Charity acquired the title La Vírgen Mambisa or the Virgin for Cuban Independence.

On 24 September 1915 the Cuban revolutionaries wrote a letter petitioning the Pope Benedict XV to honor her as Patroness of their country.

- Pope Benedict XV declared Our Lady of Charity of El Cobre Patroness of Cuba via a decree signed on 10 May 1916 at the written request of the soldier veterans of the Cuban War of Independence.
- Pope Pius XI granted a decree of canonical coronation for the image during the Eucharistic Congress at Santiago de Cuba on 20 December 1936 by the Bishop of Camaguey, Valentin Zubizarreta y Unamunsaga.
- Pope Paul VI, in his Papal bull Quanto Christi Fideles then raised her sanctuary to the category of minor basilica on 22 December 1977 through the appointed Papal legate Cardinal Bernardin Gantin.
- Pope John Paul II solemnly crowned the image again during his Apostolic Visit on 24 January 1998.
- Pope Benedict XVI raised the shrine in Havana, Cuba to the status of Minor Basilica on 9 December 2011. He later awarded a Golden Rose in honor of the image and her shrine in Santiago on 27 March 2012.
- Pope Francis enshrined a brass statue given to Pope Benedict XVI by Cuban bishops (in May 2008) within the Gardens of Vatican City in August 2014, then enshrined in 2016 at the 13th slot.

=== National symbol of Cuba ===
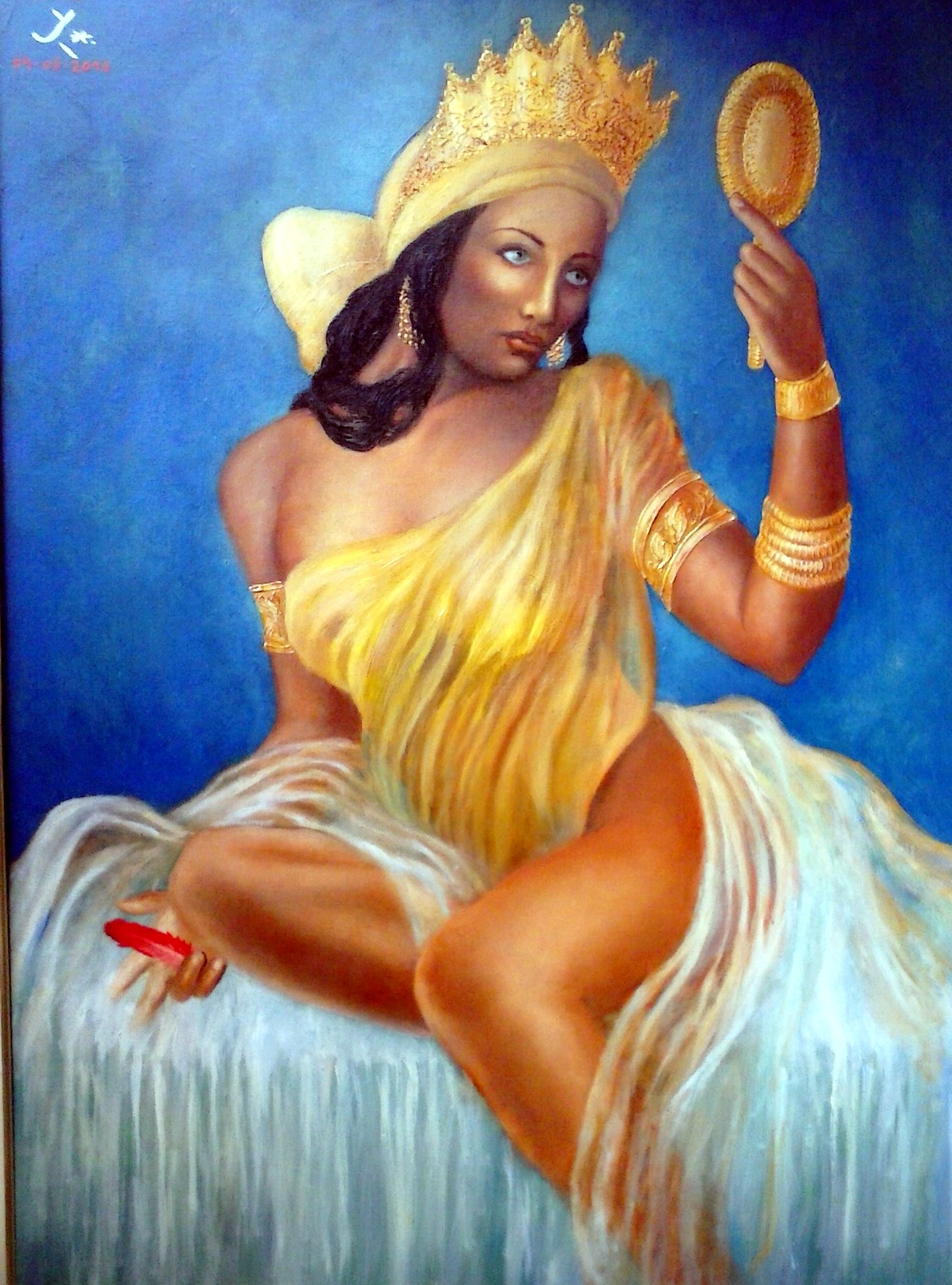
The fertility goddess Oshun sometimes syncretised to the Virgin Mary by African animists of the Yoruba pagan religion

The Virgin is one of the island's most treasured figures, representing hope and salvation in the face of misfortune. Over time, La Cachita "has become a quintessential symbol of Cuban identity". She unites both those at home and abroad, across lines of race and class. Wherever Cuban immigrants settled, they brought with them their devotion to la Caridad. Emilio Cueto points out the Christian themes suggested by La Cachita:

"She came to Cuba bearing the greatest of gifts—her own child—and appeared not to a priest or bishop, but to common men. She spoke not just to the aboriginal people, but also to the Spaniards, Creoles, and African slaves."

For Cubans who follow Yoruban religious practices, La Vírgen de la Caridad is syncretized with the orisha Ochún.

The romantic Cuban film “La Virgen de la Caridad” was released on 31 December 1930.

=== Pope John Paul II ===
On his Apostolic Visit to Cuba on 24 January 1998, Pope John Paul II declared the following:

As we remember these aspects of the mission of the Church, let us give thanks to God, who has called us to be part of it. In it, the Virgin Mary occupies a singular place. An expression of this is the Coronation of the venerated image of the Virgin of Charity of El Cobre. Cuban history is dotted with marvelous expressions of love for her Patroness, at whose feet the figures of the humble natives, two Indians and a dark-haired man, symbolize the rich plurality of this people. El Cobre, where her Sanctuary is located, was the first place in Cuba where freedom for slaves was won.

=== Pope Francis ===
On his Apostolic Visit to Cuba on 22 September 2015, Pope Francis declared the following:

The Blessed Virgin Mary has accompanied the history of the Cuban people, sustaining the hope which preserves people's dignity in the most difficult situations and championing the promotion of all that gives dignity to the human person. The growing devotion to the Virgin is a visible testimony of her presence in the soul of the Cuban people …. I will have occasion to go to El Cobre, as a son and pilgrim.

=== Ernest Hemingway ===
In the Marian year of 1954, American author Ernest Hemingway gifted his Nobel Prize in Literature medal for The Old Man and the Sea to the Marian image at the shrine of Caridad del Cobre in Cuba.

The golden medallion was stolen in 1986 and was recovered days later upon the threat of Raúl Castro that it be returned or the thieves suffer the consequences. After its return, it was for some time, hidden from view. The medal is now stored within the treasury vault of the backside of the church building and is very rarely present in the image. It is only worn during solemn and Pontifical occasions.

== France ==
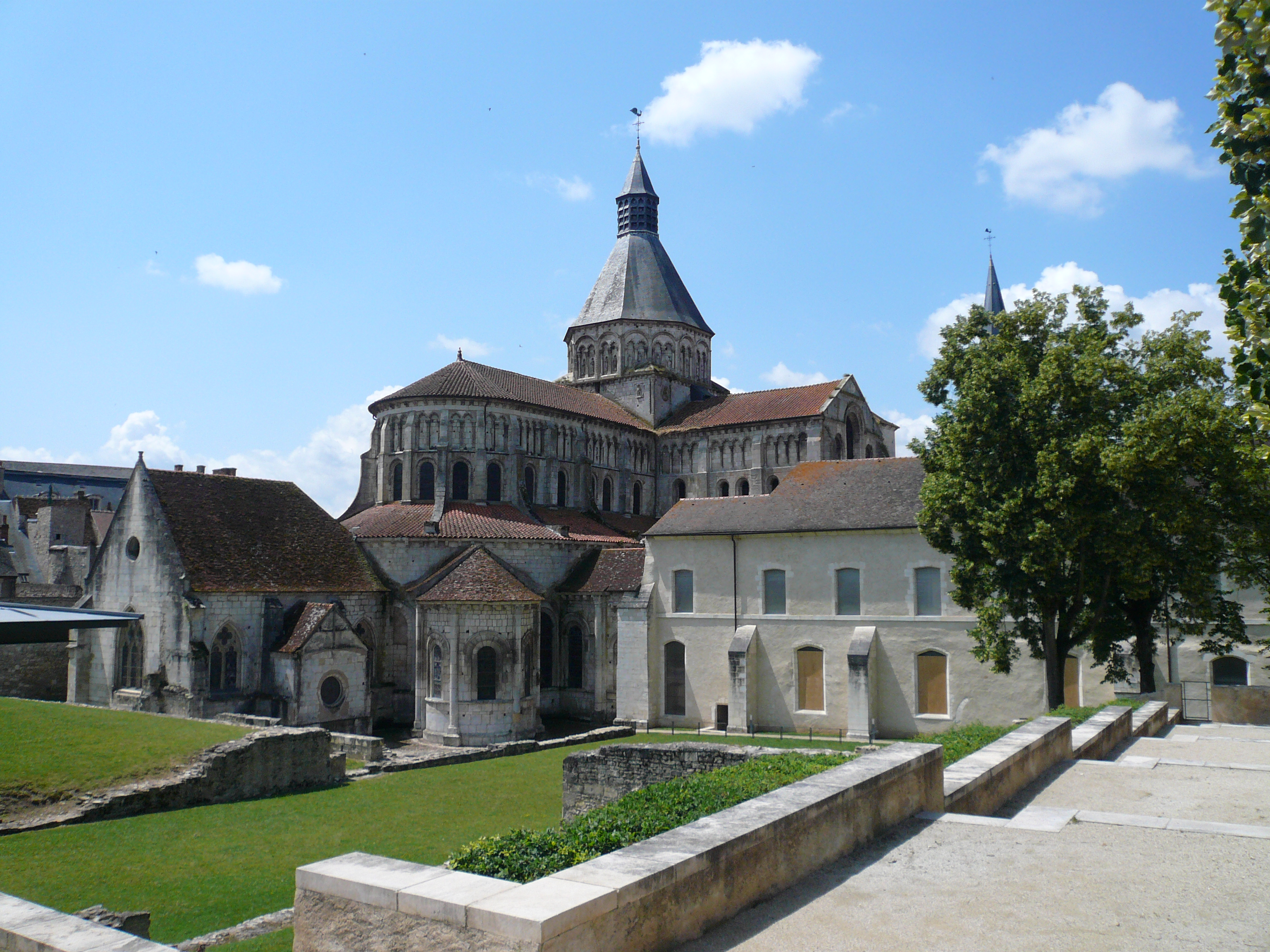
For many centuries, Notre-Dame-de-La-Charité was the second largest church in Europe

La Charité-sur-Loire was the home of the Abbaye de la Charité, a very large and famous Cistercian monastery.

Another Benedictine priory church was called Notre Dame de la Charité was built in the year 1070. It was the second largest building in Europe, only surpassed by the church at Cluny Abbey. The nave was shortened after the fire of 1559 destroyed its roof. The church has been on the list of UNESCO World Heritage Sites since 1998. It currently serves as a parish church dedicated to Notre Dame de la Nativité.

The Catholic Saint, John Eudes founded the "Order of Our Lady of Charity of the Refuge" to give reformed prostitutes housing, shelter and new work. The order survives today with many other charitable activities. Offshoot orders include both apostolic and contemplative Sisters of "Our Lady of Charity of the Good Shepherd", which have now been joined back together as one order with Christian missionary work towards sex workers.

Another pilgrimage chapel of Our Lady of Charity near Sainte Laurent sur la Plaine which was destroyed by order of the French revolutionary government in 1791. Shortly afterward, a Marian apparition was reported to be seen on the ruined altar and in a nearby oak tree. This set off more pilgrimages and became part of the unrest leading up to the War in the Vendée. Today, a small one is on the altar in the newly restored church.

== Italy ==
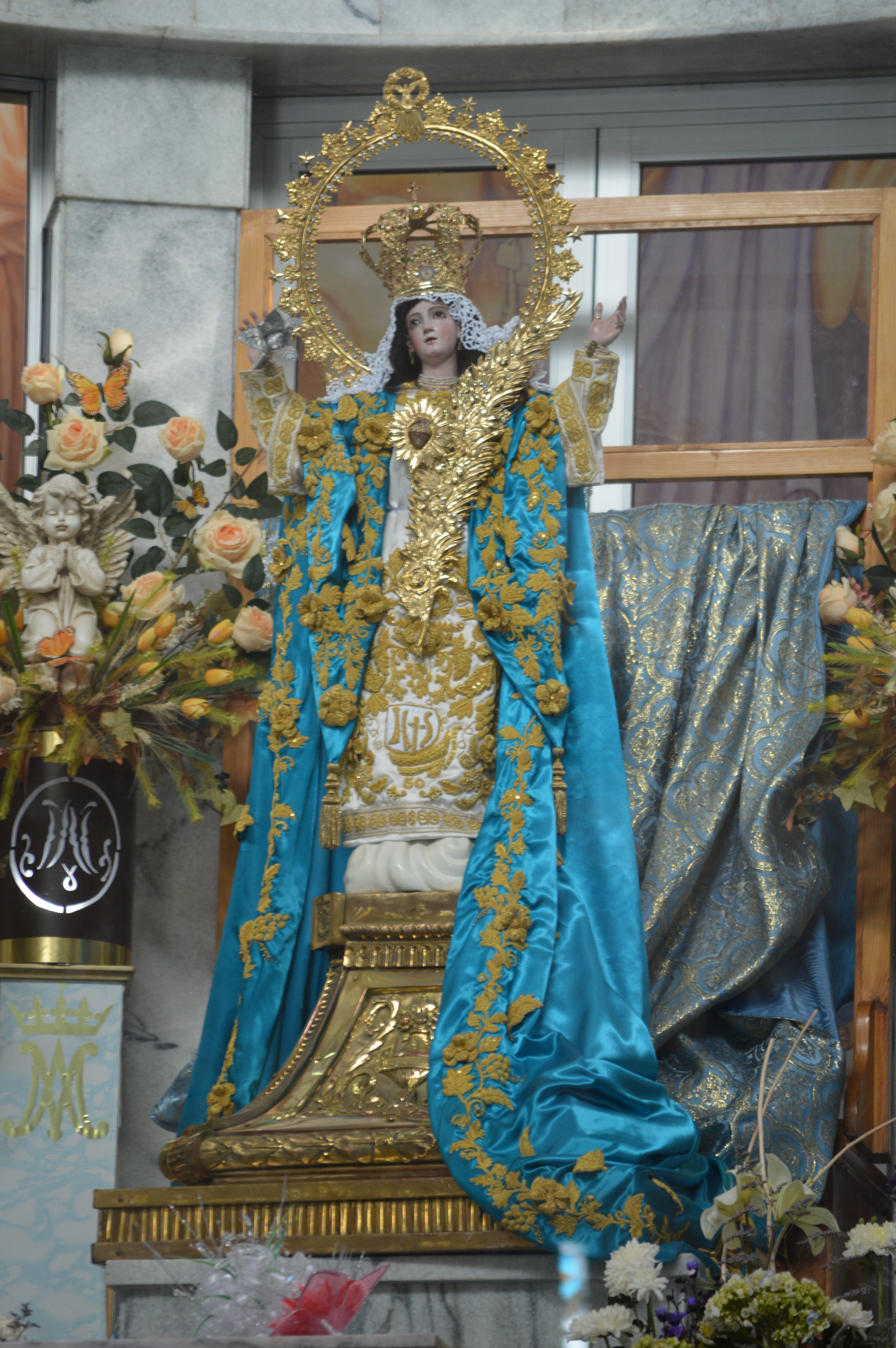
The venerated image in Huamantla, crowned by Pope Paul VI for Mexico on 15 August 1974 via formal decree Quandoquidem Beatissima Virgo dated 25 July of the same year

Pope Leo XIII bestowed a decree of canonical coronation towards a venerated wooden image of the Madonna and Child on 14 June 1886 venerated in the older Church of Corpus Christi, Moschiano via the Bishop of Nola, Joseph Formisano. The image was crafted by local artisans Gaspare Dalia and Gætano Russo.

== Mexico ==
Pope Paul VI granted a decree of Pontifical coronation titled Quandoquidem Beatissima Virgo for an image in Huamantla, Mexico on 25 July 1974. The rite of coronation was executed by Archbishop Girolamo Prigione on 15 August 1974. The same Pontiff raised the shrine to the status of Minor Basilica via his Pontifical decree Tanta est Dignitas on 5 August 1978.

== Spain ==
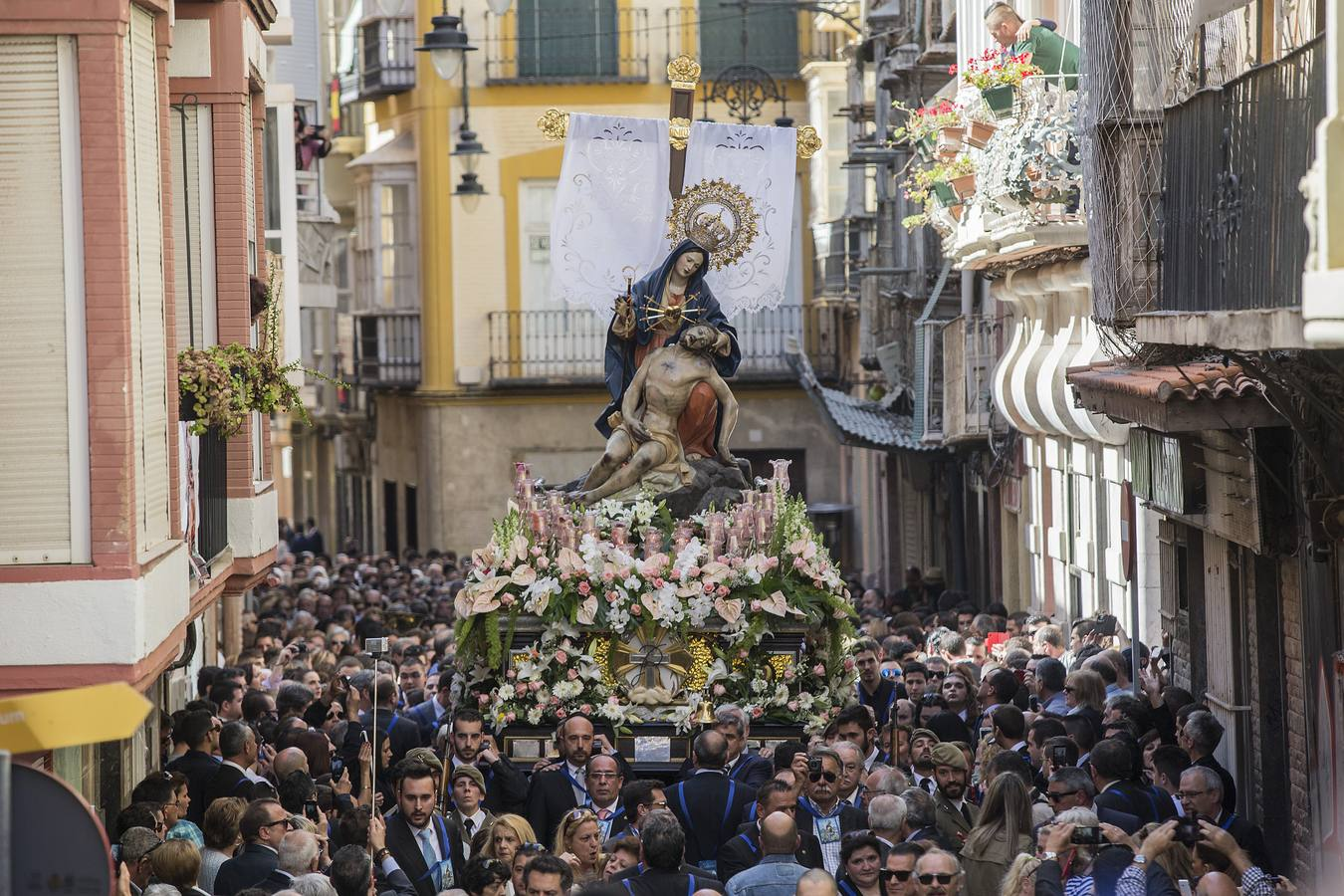
Our Lady of Charity, Patroness of Cartagena, Spain c. 1723, granted a canonical coronation on 17 April 1923 by Pope Pius XI

An earlier image of Our Lady of Charity predating and sourcing the Cuban image is venerated in the town of Illescas, Toledo, Spain. Legend recalls that it was copied from a "Saint Luke" image from Antioch and brought by Saint Paul the Apostle to Toledo between the year 50 and 60 A.D. From that date, the image remained when the Archbishop of Toledo Eugenius II of Toledo, who placed the image in a Benedictine monastery. In the 16th century, the image was transferred to a local Hospital of Charity where a famed miraculous healing of paralyzed patient Francesca de la Cruz took place in 1562. During the same time, the image was revised, separating the heads and hands of the Virgin from its fully formed or detallado style, to allow vestments and jewels to fit the image.

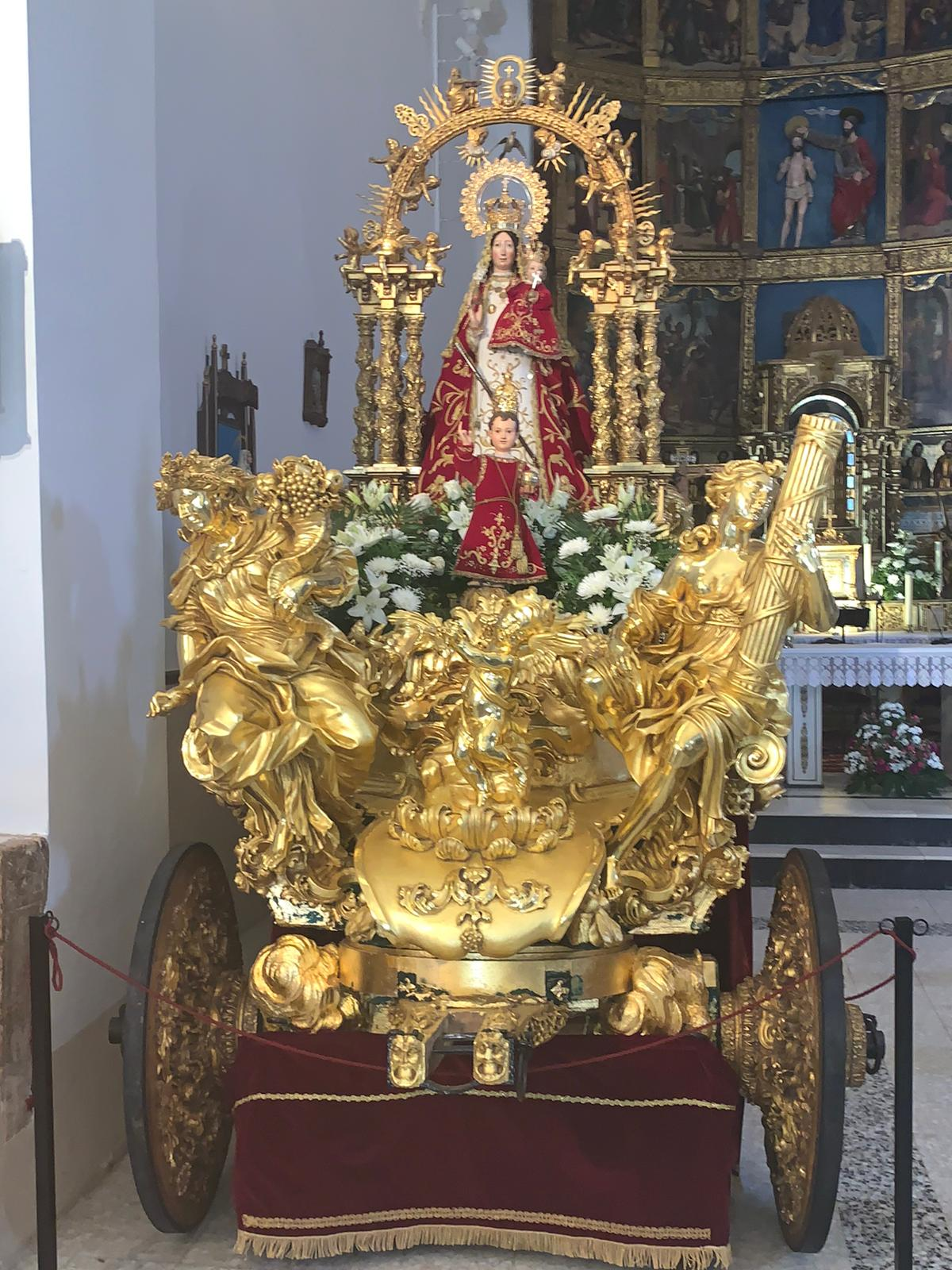
The image of Our Lady of Charity in Camarena, Toledo

The Marian title is also honored as the patroness of Camarena, Toledo. The image is venerated in the Church of San Juan Bautista, where it is enshrined in a Baroque altarpiece from the late Renaissance period, crafted by Mateo de Cibantos between 1652 and 1655. Her feast day is celebrated on August 15, coinciding with the Feast of the Assumption of the Virgin Mary, during which the town holds its major annual festivities. The image also processes through the town on Carnival Sunday. The image is carried on a historic float that was once used in the coronation of King Louis I of Spain in the 18th century, adding royal and artistic value to its traditional processions.

- Pope Pius XI granted a decree of Pontifical coronation for the venerated Pieta image of Our Lady of Charity (1723) in the city of Cartagena on 17 April 1923 through the former Bishop of Cartagena, Vicente Alonzo y Salgado.

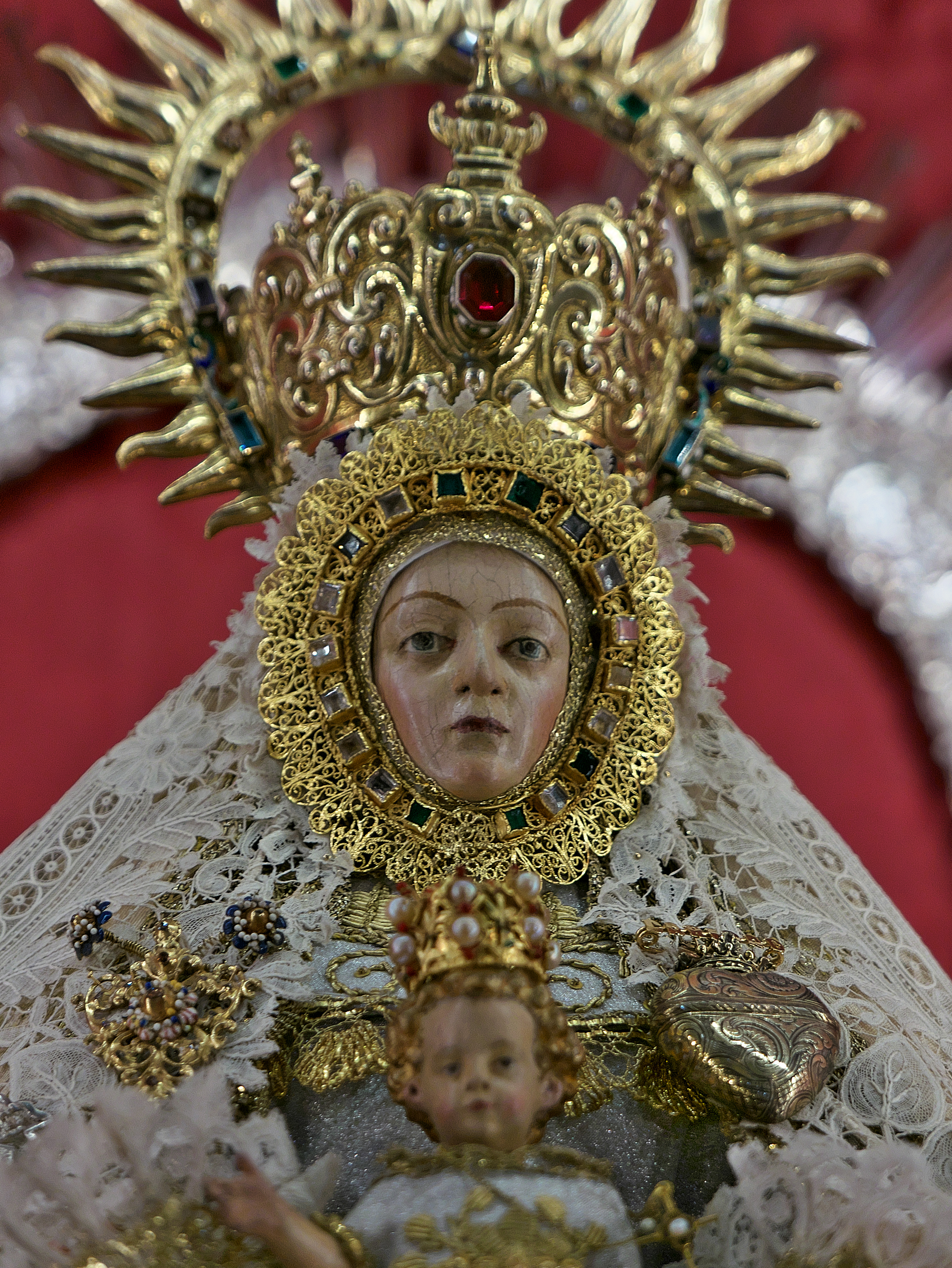
The image crowned by Pope Paul VI in Sanlúcar de Barrameda, Andalusia for Spain. Pope John Paul II later raised her shrine to the status of Minor Basilica on 19 February 1997

- Pope Paul VI granted a pontifical decree of coronation for an image in Sanlúcar de Barrameda, Andalusia on 28 March 1965. The coronation took place on 15 August of the same year. Pope John Paul II later issued a pontifical decree Qua Veneratione Augustissima which raised her shrine to the status of Minor Basilica on 19 February 1997.
- Pope Benedict XVI raised the Shrine of the Basilica of Nuestra Señora de la Caridad, Cartagena to the status of Minor Basilica on 23 March 2012.

The Greek painter and artisan Doménikos Theotokópoulos painted the Virgin of Charity in 1597, oil on canvas, now currently housed in Illescas, Spain.

== Philippines ==
In the Philippines, Our Lady of Charity is known in the Ilocano language as Apo Caridad (English: Mistress of Charity).

Marian image Pontifically crowned on 6 December 2024 by Pope Francis

- Pope Pius XII issued a Pontifical decree of coronation titled Quas Tuas Optime on 3 August 1955 for the image in Bantay Church and was granted to the Archbishop of Nueva Segovia, Santiago Caragñan y Sancho. The decree was signed by the Secretary Deacon Giulio Rossi and notarized by the Grand Chancellor, Girolamo Ricci. The rite of coronation was executed on 12 January 1956 by the Apostolic Nuncio, Cardinal Egidio Vagnozzi and named as "Patroness of Ilocandia”.
- Pope Francis granted a decree of coronation on 29 April 2024 to the image in Agoo, La Union. The rite of coronation was executed by Archbishop Charles John Brown on 6 December 2024. The image is enshrined within the Minor Basilica of Our Lady of Charity in Agoo, La Union and was episcopally crowned on 1 May 1971 under the Papal nuncio Carmine Rocco. Pope John Paul II later raised her shrine to the status of Minor Basilica via his Pontifical decree Signum illud Sanctuariumque on 15 July 1982.

== United States of America ==
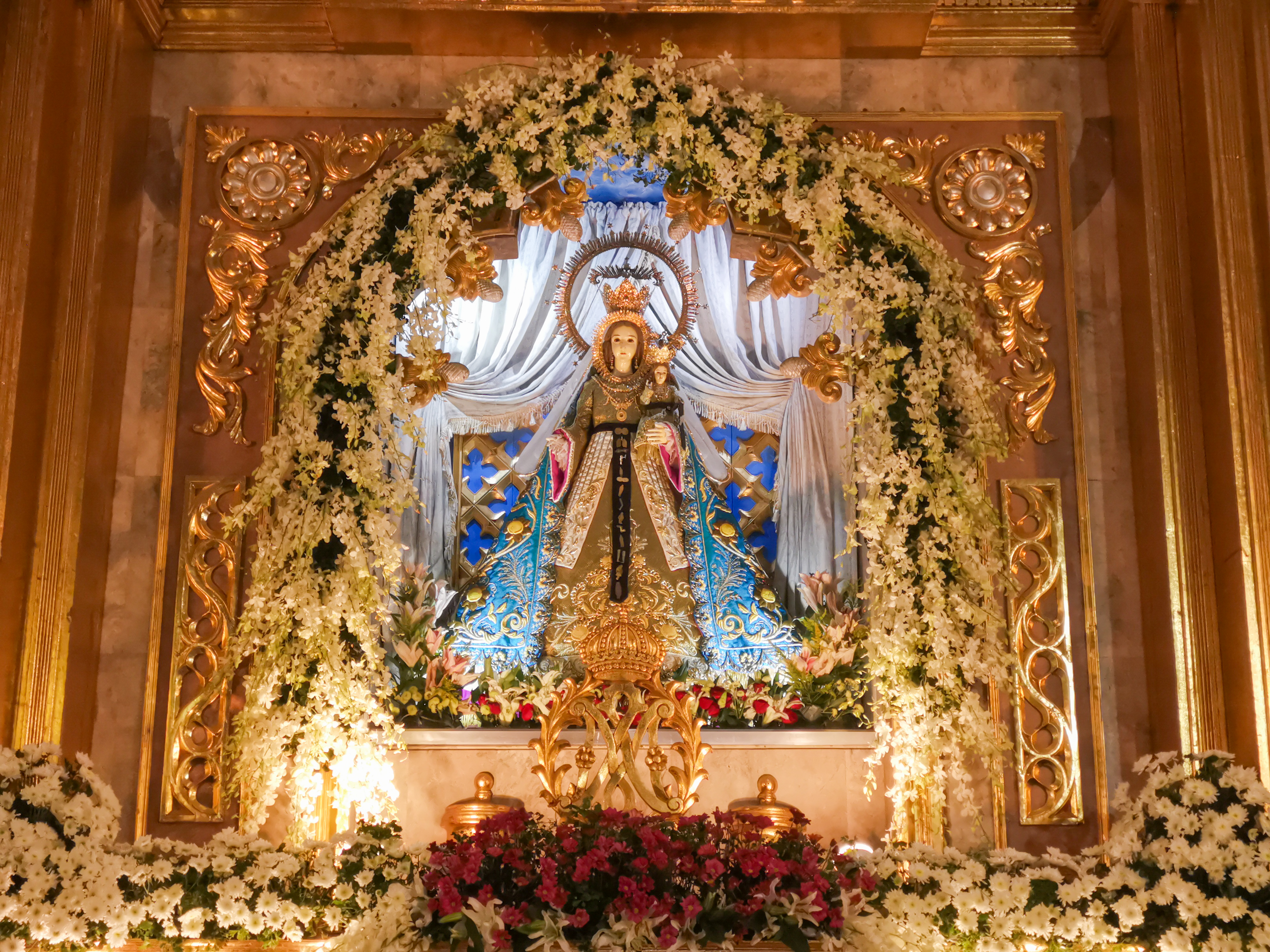
The image of the Madonna and Child venerated at the Bantay Church in the Philippines crowned by the Pontifical decree Quas Tuas Optime

On 8 September 1961, the Archdiocese of Miami celebrated the feast of Our Lady of Charity with 30,000 Cuban exiles at Miami Stadium where a 16-inch replica of the statue of Our Lady of Charity was smuggled out of Cuba through the Panamanian embassy. Due to the overwhelming Cuban devotion to this Marian title in 1966, the Archdiocese of Miami announced the construction of the Shrine of Our Lady of Charity. Construction was begun on the shrine, known as La Ermita de la Caridad, the following year on the shores of Biscayne Bay in the Coconut Grove section of Miami. The shrine was completed in 1973, built with donations by new Cuban exiles.

== Churches ==
=== Cuba ===
- El Cobre (Minor Basilica)
- Havana (Minor Basilica)

=== France ===
- La Charité-sur-Loire (Priory)

=== Mexico ===
- Huamantla, Tlaxcala (Minor Basilica)

=== Spain ===
- Cartagena (Minor Basilica)
- Villarrobledo
- Illescas
- Loja and The Garrovilla
- Cam arena

=== The Philippines ===
- Agoo, La Union (Minor Basilica)
- Bantay, Ilocos Sur

=== United States of America ===
- Miami, Florida
- Cicero, Illinois
- Buffalo, New York
