= Cartagena, Spain =

City and port on the Mediterranean

Cartagena
- Municipality
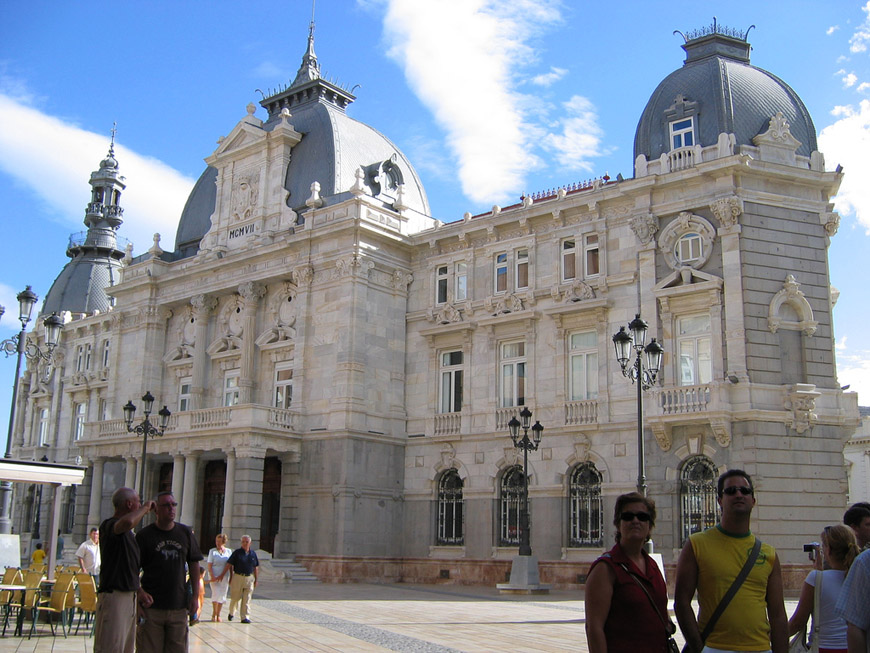
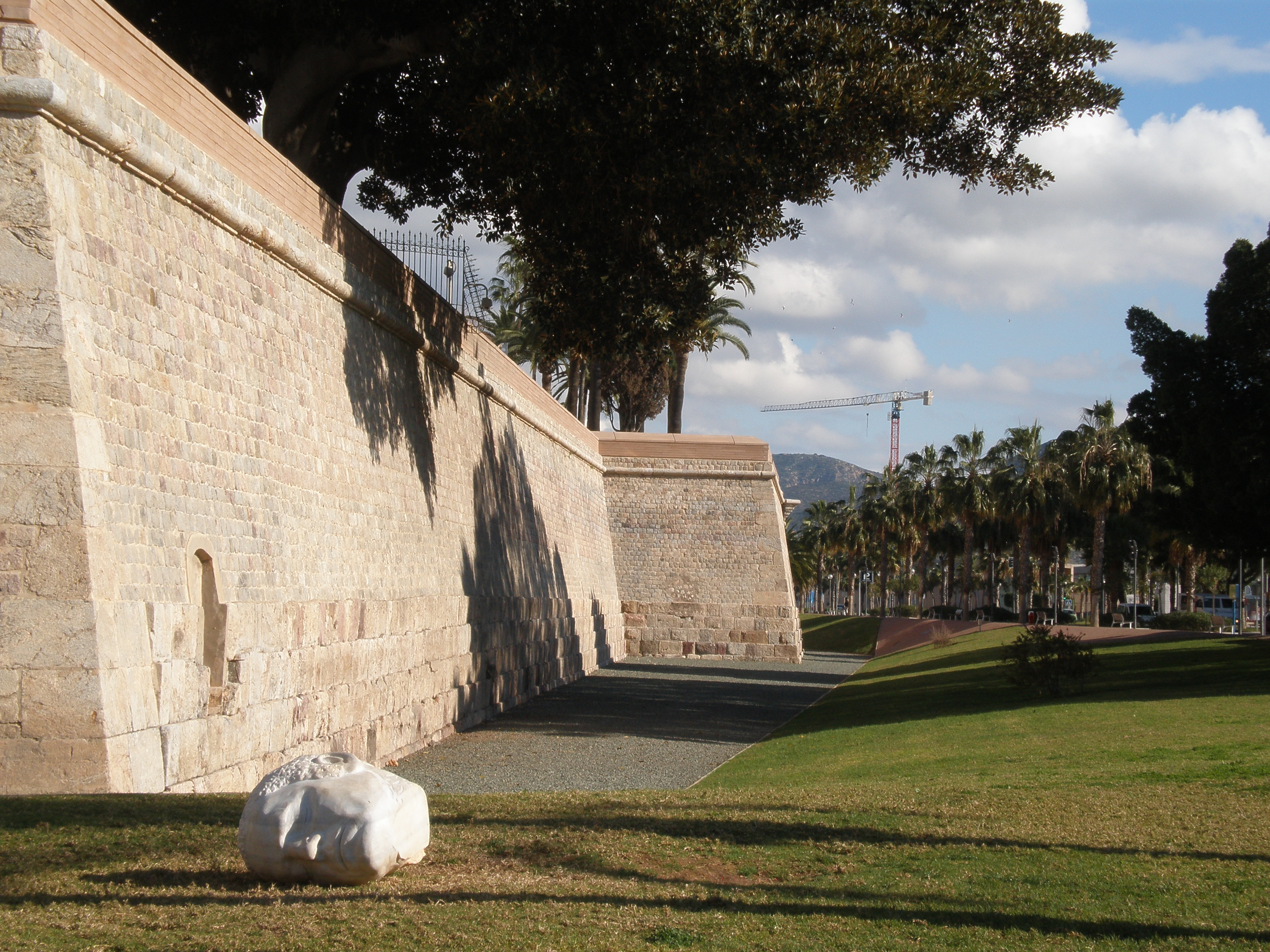
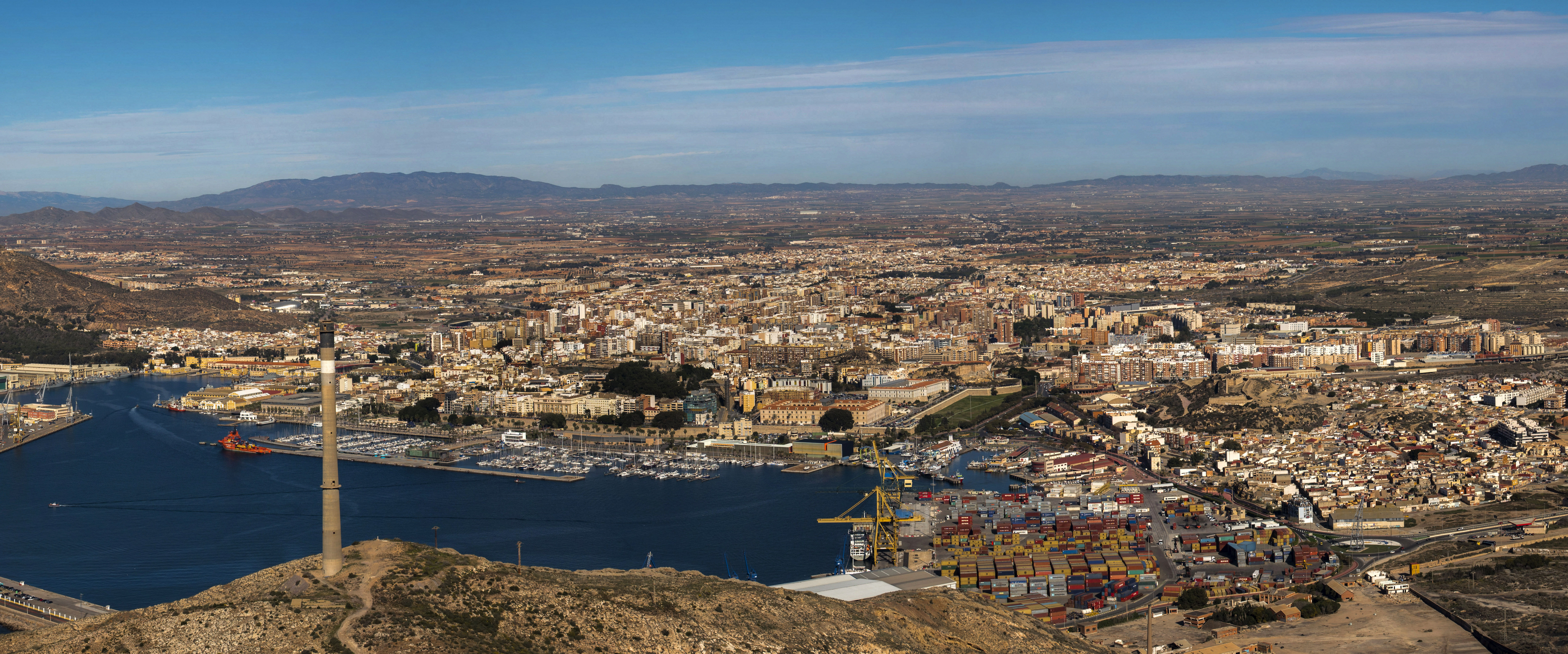
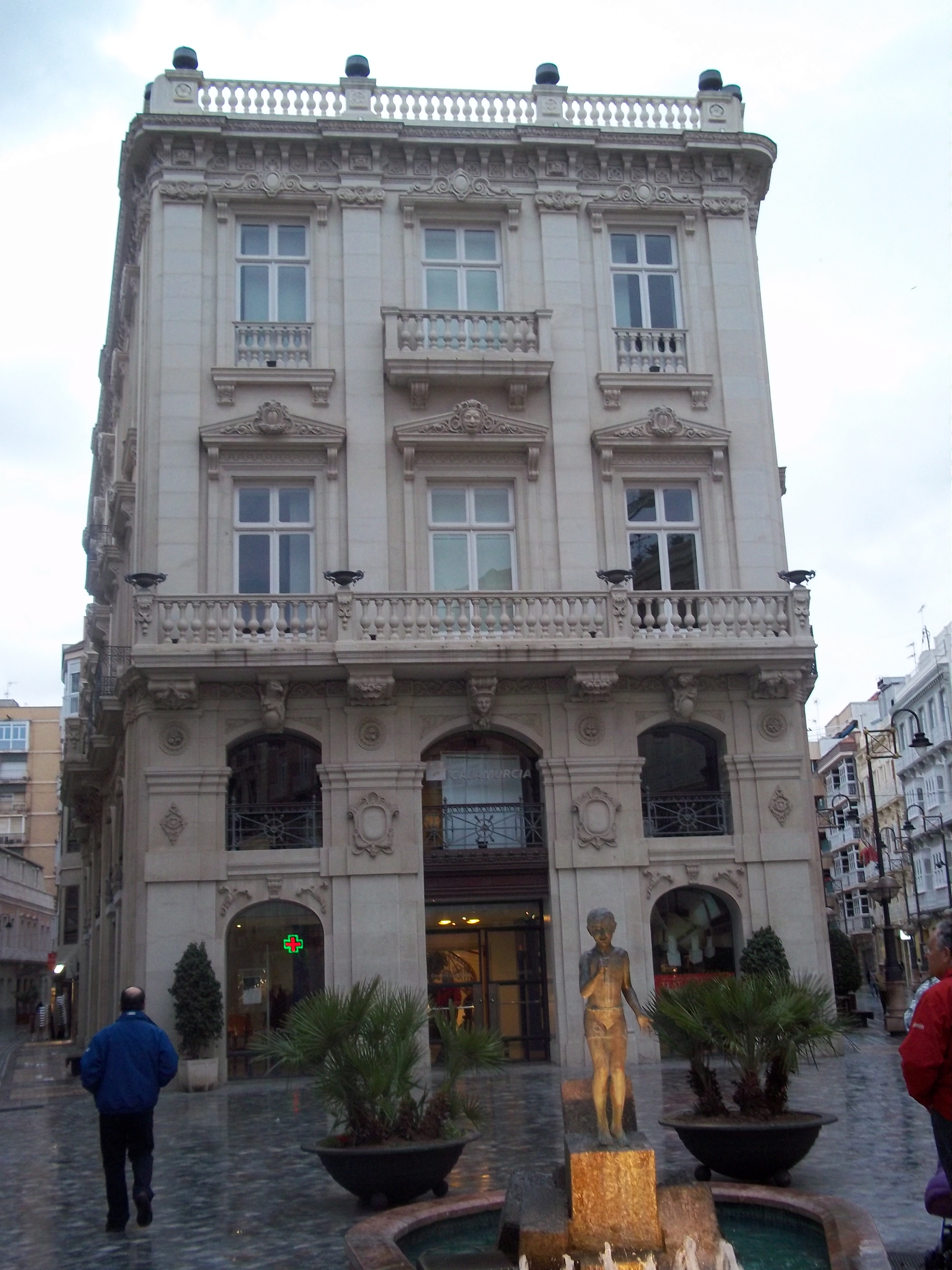
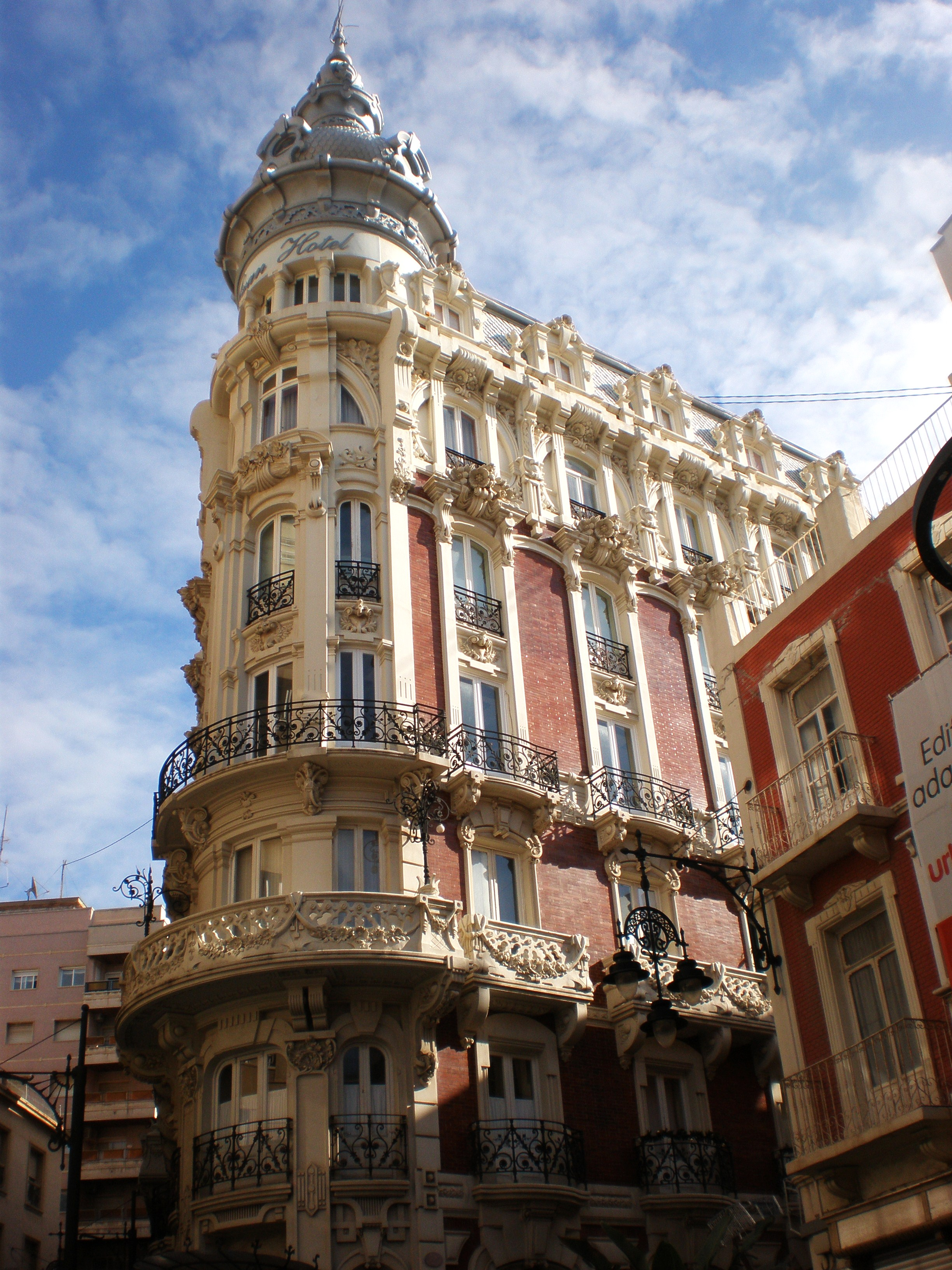
- City Hall The wall of Carlos III Panorama view Pedreño Palace Gran Hotel

- Flag Coat of arms
- Motto: Muy noble, muy leal y siempre heroica ciudad de Cartagena
- Interactive map of Cartagena
- Location within Murcia Location within Spain
- Coordinates: 37°36′07″N 0°59′03″W
- Country: Spain
- Autonomous community: Region of Murcia
- Founded: 227 BC
- Named for: Carthage

Government
  - Mayor: Noelia Arroyo (People's Party)

Area
  - Total: 560.19 km^{2} (216.29 sq mi)
- Elevation: 10 m (33 ft)
- Highest elevation (Peñas Blancas): 627 m (2,057 ft)
- Lowest elevation (Mediterranean Sea): 0 m (0 ft)

Population (2024)
  - Total: 219,235
  - Rank: 25th in Spain
  - Density: 391.36/km^{2} (1,013.6/sq mi)
- Demonym: Cartageneros
- Time zone: UTC+1 (CET)
  - Summer (DST): UTC+2 (CEST)
- Postal code: 302xx and 303xx
- Dialing code: (+34) 968
- Website: www.cartagena.es

Cartagena (Spanish: [kaɾtaˈxena]) is a city in the Region of Murcia in Spain. As of 2024, with a population of 219,235, it is the second most populated municipality in the Region of Murcia. The city lies in a natural harbour of the Mediterranean coastline of the southeast of the Iberian Peninsula. The wider urban or metropolitan area of Cartagena, known as Campo de Cartagena, has a population of 409,586 inhabitants.

Qart-Hadast was founded around 227 BC by the Barcids of Ancient Carthage. Known as Carthago Nova under Roman rule, it was the capital of Hispania Carthaginensis. It was briefly held by the Byzantine Empire in late antiquity, before being raided by Visigoths circa 620–625. The Islamic city rebuilt around the Concepción Hill, mentioned as Qartayânnat al-Halfa, was noted by the 11th century as a great harbor.

Unsubmissive to the terms of the Treaty of Alcaraz, Cartagena was taken by force by the Crown of Castile in 1245, with aggressive settlement policies being pursued afterwards pursuant to Cartagena's status as a prize of war. While Cartagena ended up as the sole Castilian port in the region for years to come, its constrained prominence conformed to Castile's limited attention to Mediterranean affairs in the late middle ages. It was secured by the Crown in 1503 after a period in private hands, growing in saliency because of its increasing trade prowess and its role in the Hispanic Monarchy's intervention in the Maghreb, and becoming the base of the Spanish Mediterranean fleet in the 18th century. Following the re-opening of the mines in the Sierra Minera, a mining industry developed after 1840, otherwise prompting the 1860 segregation of the mining district into a new municipality. Cartagena was a hotspot of the Cantonal Rebellion in 1873. Hammered by industrial re-structuring policies, it underwent a profound job crisis in the early 1990s.

The city hosts an important base of the Spanish Navy and a large naval shipyard. The city preserves a Roman Theatre, an abundance of Punic, Roman, Byzantine and Moorish remains, and a plethora of Art Nouveau buildings from the early 20th century.

== History ==
=== Prehistory ===
There is evidence of the presence of individuals belonging to the genus Homo in the cave Cueva Victoria 1,300,000 years ago. This cave is located in the southeastern quarter of Cartagena.

Remains of Neanderthal individuals of the Mousterian culture were found in the Cave of los Aviones. This place is located close to Cartagena. There were also remains of Neanderthals belonging to the Mousterian culture in the Cueva Bermeja, which is located in the southwestern quarter of the municipality.

At the southeast corner of the municipality remains of humans of the Upper Paleolithic were discovered. The paleontological sites are the Abrigo de Los Déntoles cove, the Cueva de Los Mejillones, and the Cabezo de San Ginés (hill). The West of the municipality was also the scene of human activity in that period. Concrete evidence of this are the caves Cueva del Caballo and Cueva Bermeja.

The southeast end of Cartagena was inhabited again during the Mesolithic. Important points are the Cueva de los Pájaros and Cueva de los Mejillones (caves). Neolithic components such as ceramic shards have been found.

The southeast of Cartagena was again inhabited during the Neolithic. The sites are Las Amoladeras and Calblanque. The south of the Alumbres district was also inhabited during that period. The archaeological site is located in the Cerro del Gorguel (hill) and in it remains of a characteristic Neolithic hamlet were discovered.

The reasons for the dearth of human presence and structures in this municipality during the Neolithic period were the lack of rainfall and the absence of water courses. During the Bronze Age there was a similar situation.

The Argaric civilization inhabited the southeast of the Iberian Peninsula (Región de Murcia and Almería) during the Bronze Age. Nevertheless, they did not significantly occupy this municipality, there were few structures belonging to them and they had little relevance here. They lived in the northwest.

=== Ancient history ===
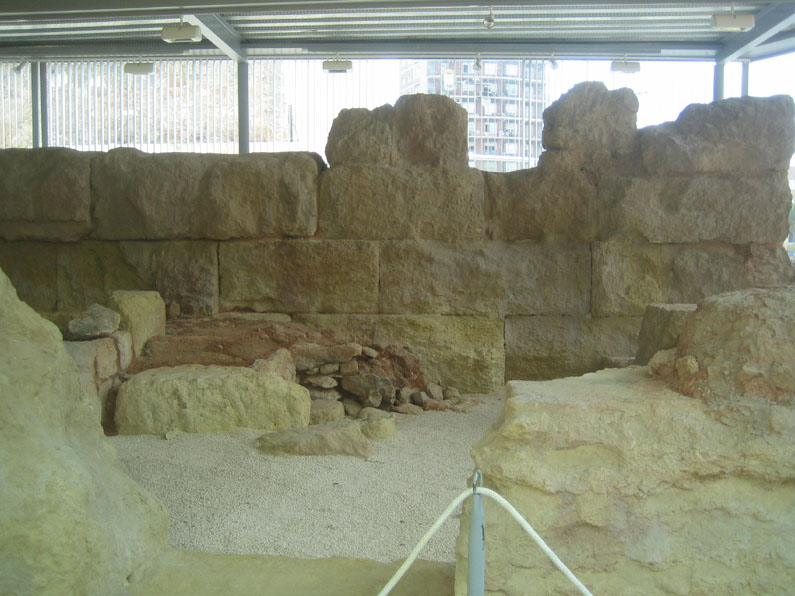
Carthaginian walls of Carthago Nova (3rd century BC)

The town is thought to have originally been named Mastia. Possessing one of the best harbors in the Western Mediterranean, it was re-founded by the Carthaginian general Hasdrubal around 227 BC as Kart-hadasht ("New City"), a name identical to Carthage, for the purpose of serving as a stepping-off point for the conquest of Spain.

The Roman general Scipio Africanus conquered it in 209 BC and renamed it Carthago Nova (literally "New Carthage," and therefore etymologically "New New City") to distinguish it from the mother city. It became a tributary community (civitas stipendaria). Julius Caesar gave the town Latin Rights, and Octavian renamed it in his honor as the colony Colonia Victrix Iulia Nova Carthago or Colonia Vrbs Iulia Nova Carthago (C. V. I. N. C.) depending on the source. The city was very relevant both in the Carthaginian and the Roman conquest of the Iberian Peninsula. In 298 AD, Diocletian constituted a new Roman province in Hispania called Carthaginensis and settled the capital in this city. It remained important until it was sacked by the Vandals in 435 AD.

During the Roman period, it was the site of major silver mines, yielding a daily revenue of 25,000 drachmae. It was known also for the production of garum, a fermented fish sauce, and for esparto grass which granted it a new name, Cartago Spartaria.

=== Middle Ages ===
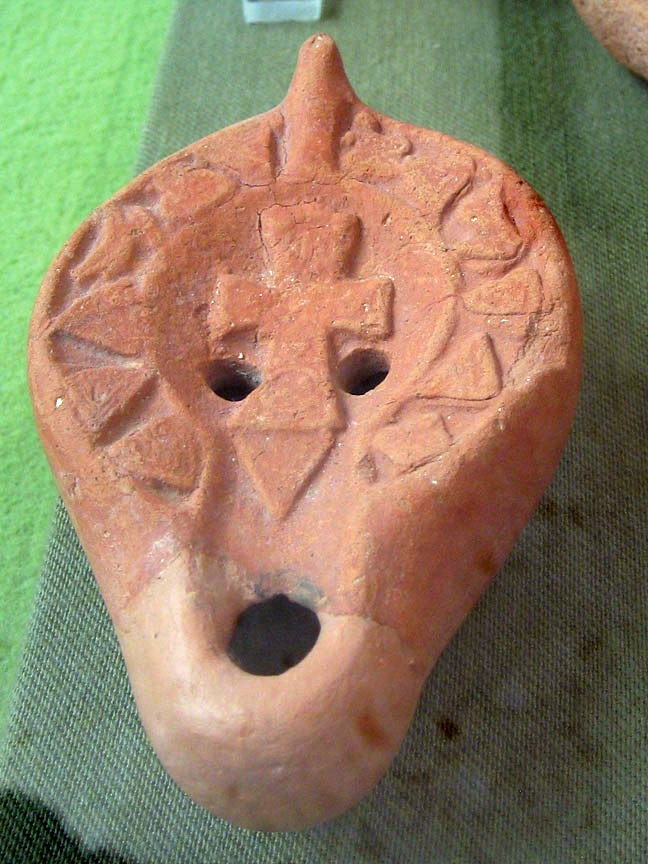
Byzantine lamp (6th century)

The demise and fall of Western Roman sovereignty caused Cartago Spartaria to go into decline. It was occupied successively by the Vandals (409–425), the Visigoths (425–551 and 624–714) and the Eastern Romans (551–624), who made it the capital of Spania (the Byzantine Empire's westernmost province). During this time the Christian diocese of Cartagena lost its place as the primary diocese in Hispania to the more reliably Visigothic Archdiocese of Toledo, a primacy it would never recover.

Cartagena was re-conquered by the Visigoths, who held it until the Muslim conquest in 714 AD. By that time it was barely a fishing village. It was called Qartayannat-al-Halfa. It was subsequently ruled by the Umayyads (714–756), the Caliphate of Cordova (756–1031), the Taifa of Denia (1031–1076), the Taifa of Saragossa (1076–1081), the Taifa of Tortosa (1081–1092), the Almoravids (1092–1145), the Almohads (1145–1229) and the Taifa of Murcia (1229–1245). During the Islamic period, Cartagena primarily oriented itself to the sea, possessing at best a small rural hinterland.

Following the local refusal to abide by the 1243 Treaty of Alcaraz, a Castilian army led by the infante Alfonso of Castile took Cartagena by force in 1245 by means of a military operation combining land forces and a Cantabrian fleet. It was granted a fuero copied after Córdoba's in 1246. Similarly to the other subdued rebel towns, it early underwent an aggressive process of Castilianization. The diocese of Cartagena was restored in 1250, but its seat was established in Murcia since 1266, a decision later formalised in 1291. In 1270, Alfonso created the Order of Santa María de España for the naval defense of the Crown of Castile and established its headquarters in Cartagena. In 1296, Cartagena was briefly annexed to the Crown of Aragon, but returned to Castile by the Treaty of Elx in 1305, which fixed the final boundary between the kingdoms of Valencia and Murcia. Cartagena then lost its status as royal demesne and became a seigneurial jurisdiction, a situation which lasted until 1346. Cartagena did not fully recover until the 18th century, when it became a leading naval port in the Mediterranean.

During the 1492 expulsion of the Jews from Spain, chronicler Andrés Bernáldez reports that seventeen ships carrying Jewish deportees reached Cartagena before continuing to Málaga; about 150 Jews converted to Christianity in Cartagena.

=== Modern history ===
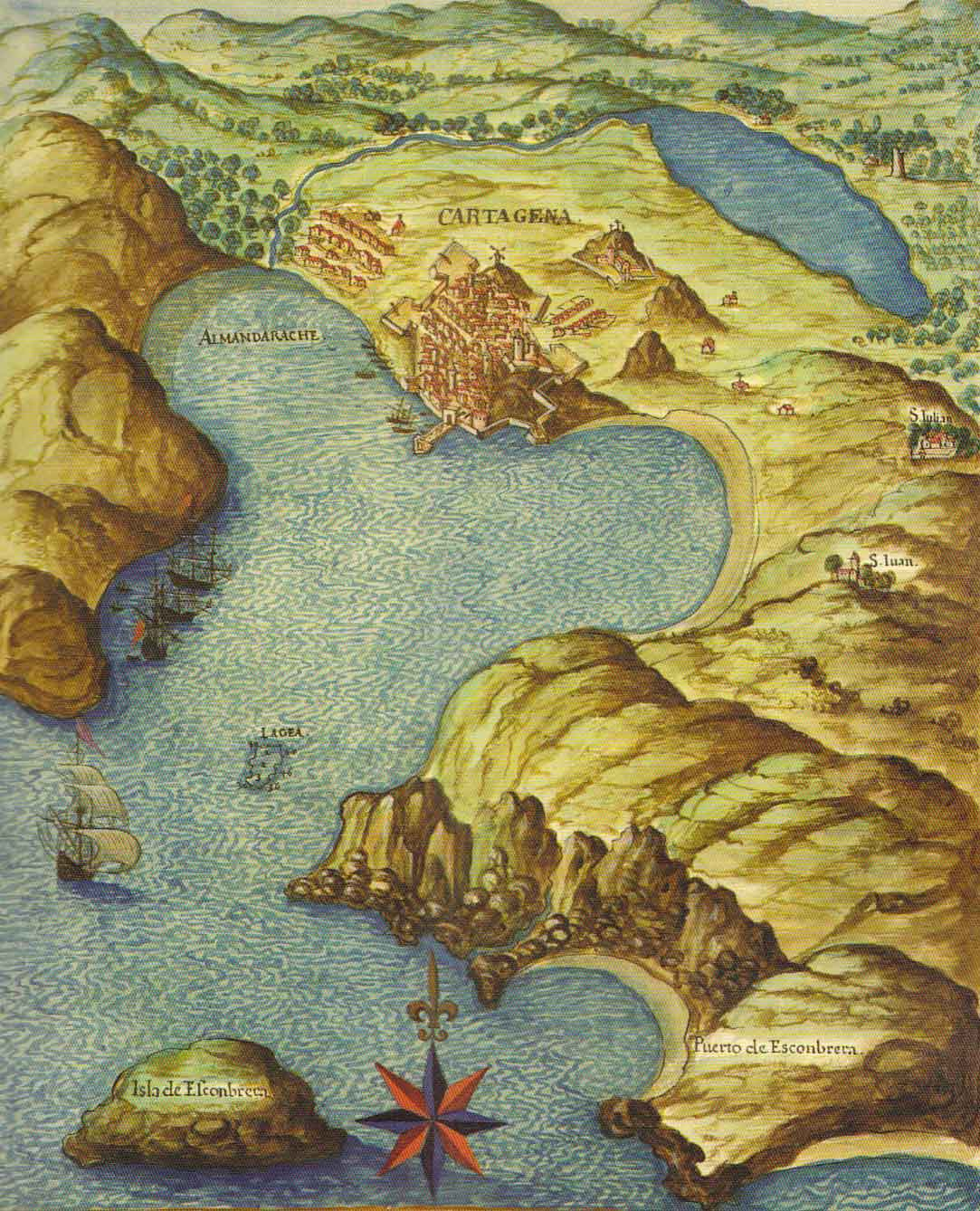
Map by Pedro Teixeira (1634)

On 3 September 1643, the Battle of Cartagena took place near the Cabo de Gata between a Spanish fleet and a French fleet.

In 1728, Cartagena became the capital of the Spanish Navy's Maritime Department of the Mediterranean and the city was heavily fortified with the construction of a modern castle in the place of a former Moorish Kasbah, several barracks and a huge Cartagena Arsenal. In a relatively short period of time, the population of the city grew from around 10,000 to 50,000 inhabitants.

In 1757, during the Seven Years' War, a French Navy force was forced to take shelter in the port. A squadron under Michel-Ange Duquesne de Menneville sent to reinforce them was attacked and defeated by a Royal Navy squadron under Henry Osborn at the Battle of Cartagena.

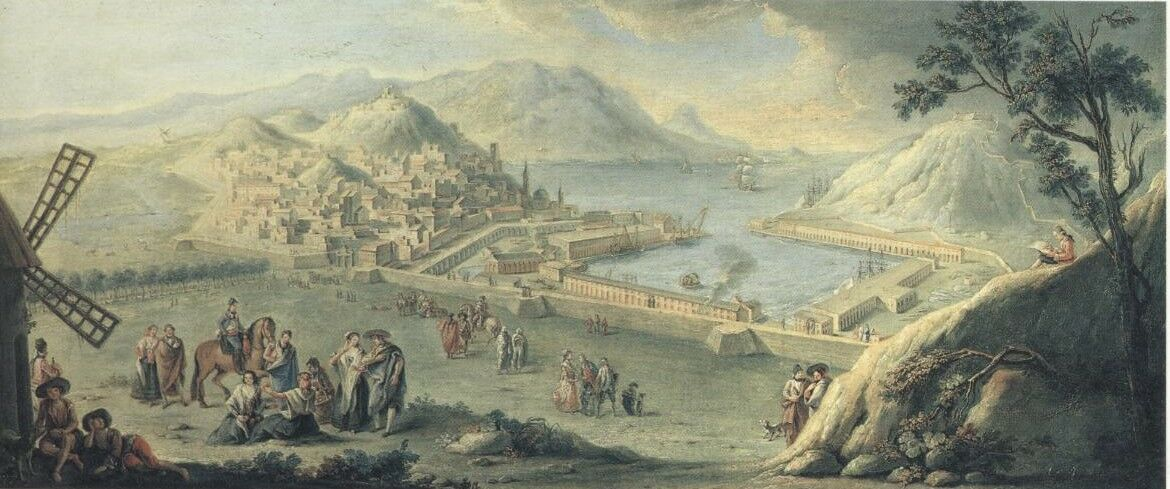
View of Cartagena by Manuel de la Cruz (1786)

In 1873, the city established a self-governing Canton of Cartagena and become the center of the Cantonal Revolution. Governmental forces besieged the city for several months until they surrendered.

During the Spanish Civil War (1936–1939), Cartagena was the main base of the Spanish Republican Navy and one of the primary strongholds of the Republican Government. It held out against the forces of General Francisco Franco longer than any other city in Spain, being the last of its cities to surrender. The city saw its industrial activity increase during the 1950s, resulting in greater prosperity.

Hammered by industrial re-structuring policies, the city underwent a profound job crisis in the early 1990s, stirring up protests and the burning of the regional legislature.

=== Present ===
At the moment, Cartagena comprises part of the autonomous community of the Region of Murcia, and is the seat of the Regional Assembly of Murcia. It is also capital of the maritime province of Cartagena, which was granted by the Royal Decree of 5 October 1607 under the reign of Philip III.

== Geography ==
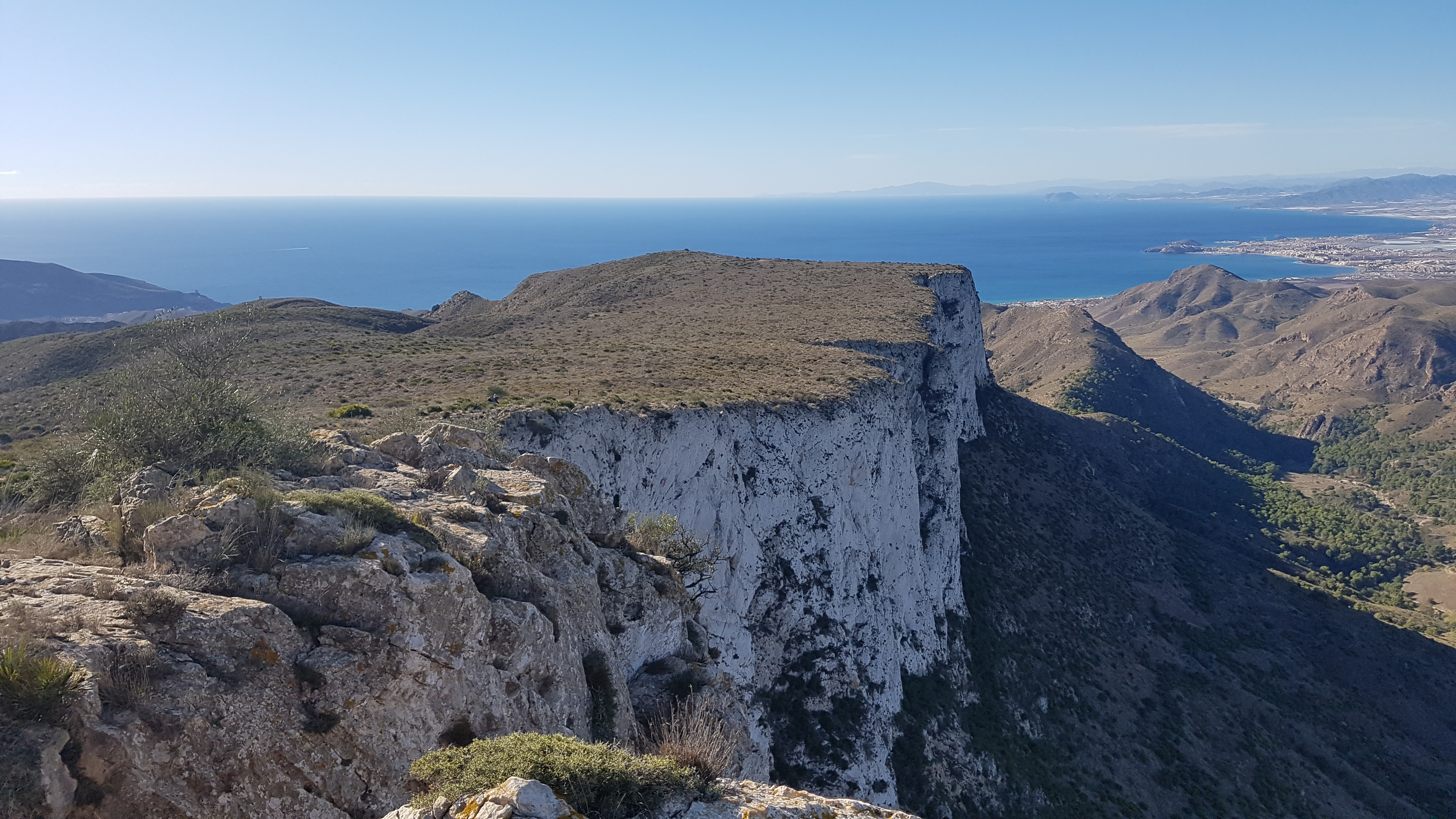
Peñas Blancas constitutes the highest point in the municipality

The city of Cartagena is located in the southeastern region of Spain in the Campo de Cartagena. The Cartagena region can be viewed as a great plain inclined slightly in the direction NW-SE, bordered at the north and the northwest by pre-coastal mountain ranges (Carrascoy, El Puerto, Los Villares, Columbares and Escalona), and at the south and southwest by coastal mountain ranges (El Algarrobo, La Muela, Pelayo, Gorda, La Fausilla y Minera, with its last spurs in Cape Palos).

The dominant geology of the region is metamorphic (slate, marble) and sedimentary (limestone). The most widely present kind of soil is calcic xerosol. Other soils that occur in the municipality are the leptosol, which forms the Mediterranean coast, and the petrocalcic xerosol.

The city is located just at the end of the new AP-7 motorway. The following villages are part of Cartagena municipality: La Azohía, Isla Plana, Los Urrutias and Los Nietos.

The Old Town is limited by five small hills (Molinete, Monte Sacro, Monte de San José, Despeñaperros and Monte de la Concepción) following the example of Rome. In the past, there was an inner sea between the hills called the Estero that eventually dried up. On this site, the "Ensanche" (Expansion or New Town) was built at the beginning of the 20th century.

The urban area is delimited or crossed by several watercourses, some of which go deep into the urban network during a large part of their courses.

The maximum height in the municipality is reached in the Peñas Blancas massif, at 627 metres above sea level.

=== Environment ===
Despite the intense mining, tourist, and industrial exploitation that the area has suffered for centuries, the territory around Cartagena city hosts an extraordinary natural wealth and diversity, with a large number of botanical endemic species. Part of its area is subject to different levels of legal protection.

=== Flora ===
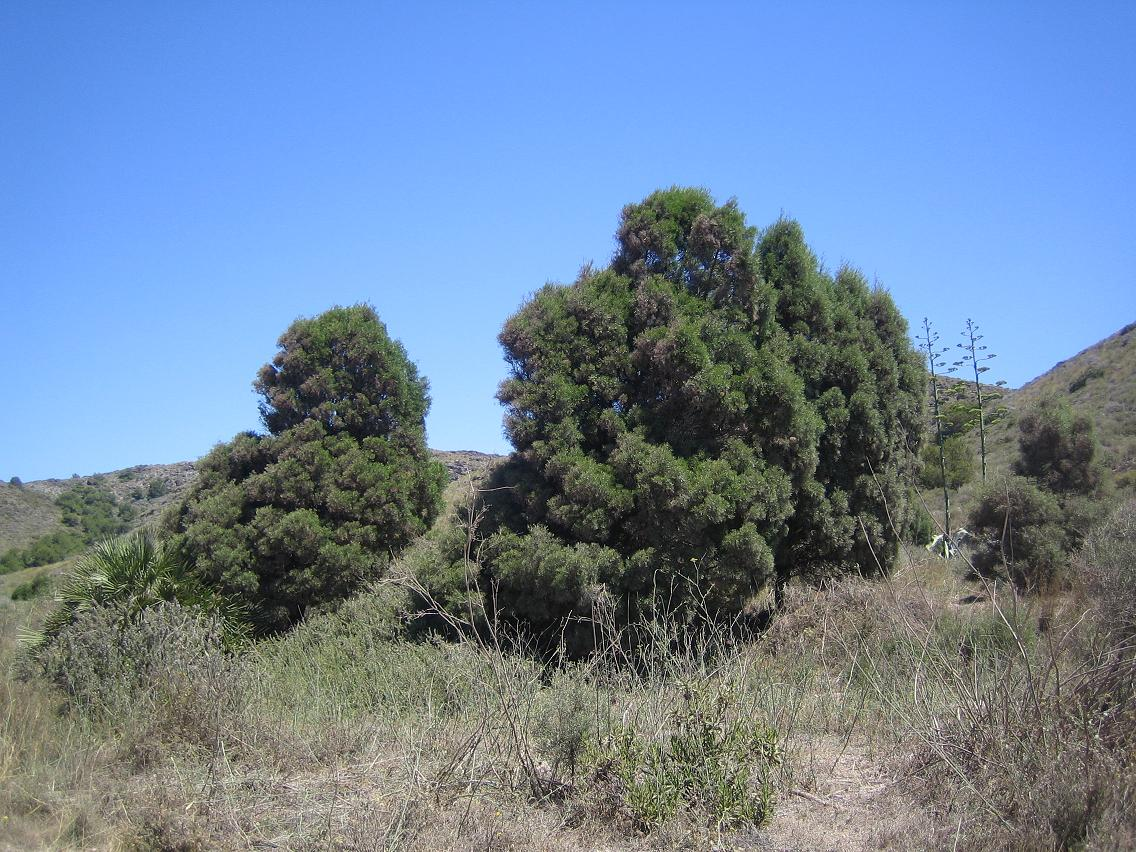
Tetraclinis articulata

Cartagena's coastal mountains have one of the highest levels of botanical biodiversity on the Iberian Peninsula. A number of surprising Ibero-African species, which are found only in southern Spain (mostly in the provinces of Murcia and Almería) and North Africa. Among these, there stands out Tetraclinis articulata or Sandarac (sabina mora or ciprés de Cartagena —Cartagena cypress in Spanish) native to Morocco, Algeria, Tunisia, Malta, and Cartagena, growing at relatively low altitudes in a hot, dry Mediterranean woodland. Some species are seriously endangered like the siempreviva de Cartagena (Limonium carthaginense), the rabogato del Mar Menor (Sideritis marmironensis), the zamarrilla de Cartagena (Teucrium carthaginense), the manzanilla de Escombreras (Anthemis chrysantha), the garbancillo de Tallante (Astragalus nitidiflorus), the jara de Cartagena (Cistus heterophyllus carthaginensis) and the varica de San José (Narcissus tortifolius).

=== Fauna ===
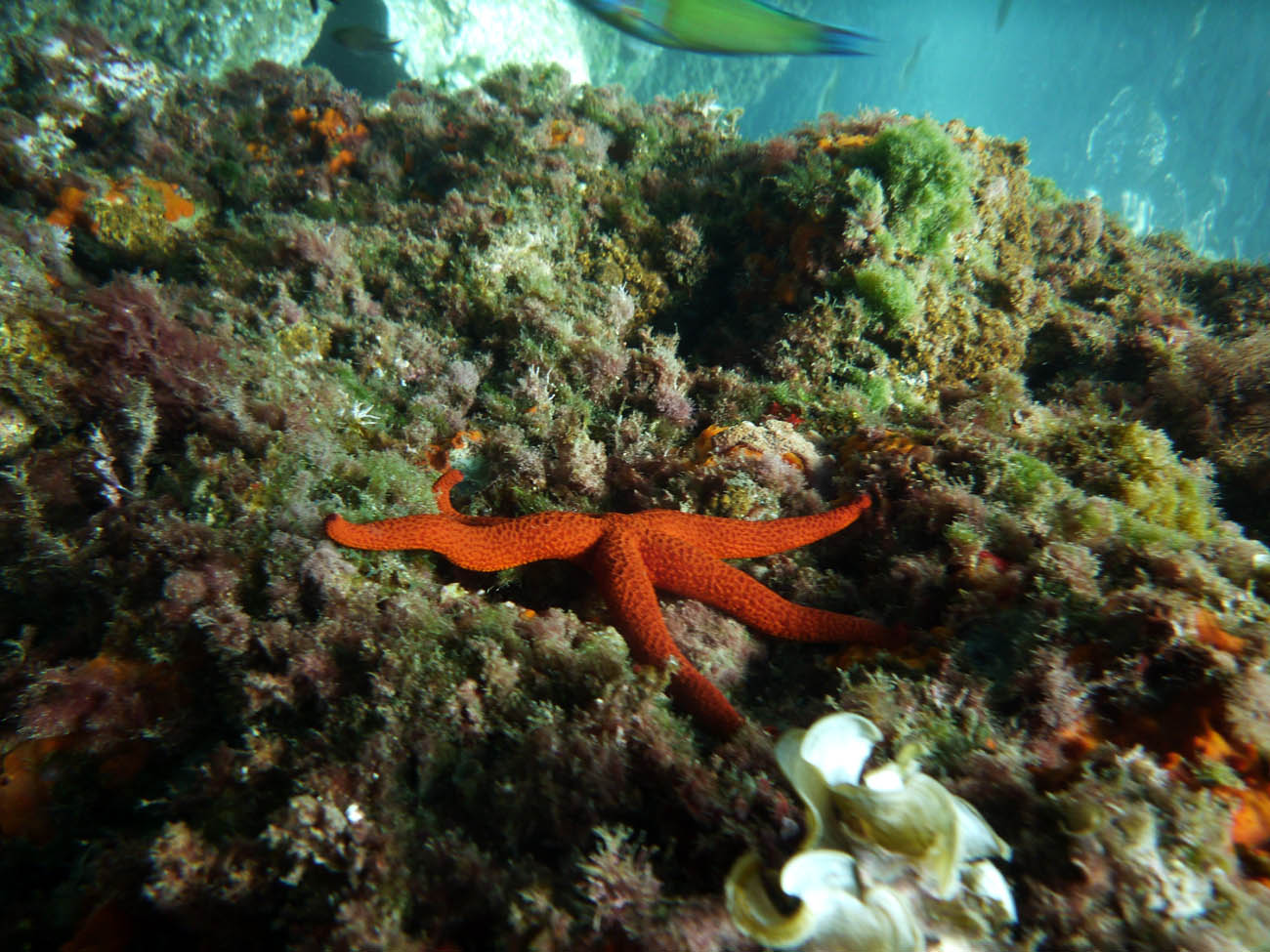
Coral reefs in Cartagena

Among the animal species includes some threatened or endangered ones like the peregrine falcon, the Eurasian eagle-owl, the golden eagle and the Bonelli's eagle, the spur-thighed tortoise, the greater horseshoe bat and, especially, the Spanish toothcarp, a fish endemic to south-eastern Spain. In addition, the presence of the common chameleon (the only chameleon in Europe) has been documented for about 30 years, although it is not clear whether it is native or introduced. Some other species of note include the greater flamingo, the red fox, the European rabbit, the European badger, the beech marten, the common genet, the wildcat and the wild boar.

=== Protected areas ===
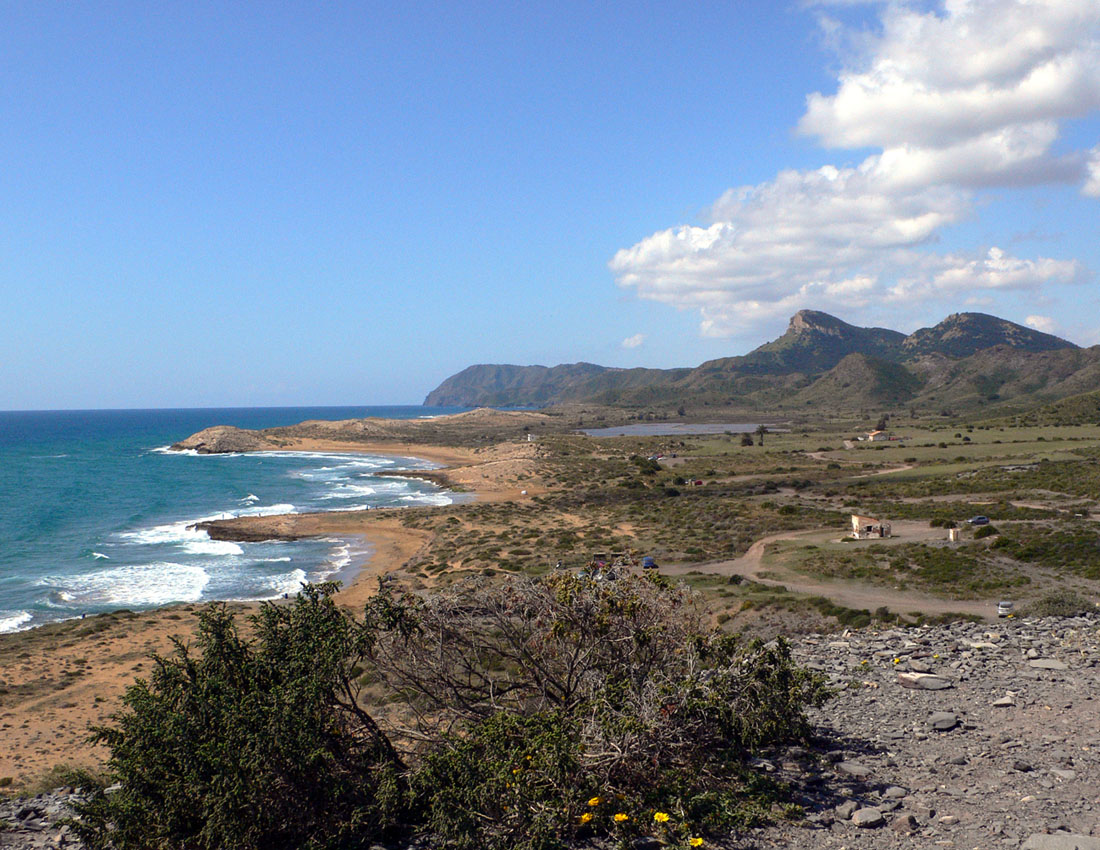
Natural Park of Calblanque

- Mar Menor, a salty lagoon separated from the Mediterranean Sea by a sand bar 22 kilometres (14 miles) in length and with a variable width from 100 to 1,200 metres (328 to 3,937 feet). It has a surface area of nearly 170 km^{2} (66 sq mi), a coastal length of 70 km (43 mi), and warm and clear water with relatively high salinity, which does not exceed 7 metres (23 feet) in depth. It belongs to four municipalities, including Cartagena. In 1994, it was included on the list of the Ramsar Convention (nº706) for the conservation and sustainable utilization of wetlands. It is also one of the Specially Protected Areas of Mediterranean Importance (SPAMI) by the United Nations. Its five volcanic islands (Perdiguera, Mayor or del Barón, del Ciervo, Redonda and del Sujeto) just like El Carmolí and San Ginés hills, the Hita and Amoladora beaches, the Lo Poyo salt marsh and the salt mines of Marchamalo are protected as well.
- Calblanque, Monte de las Cenizas and Peña del Águila, declared a Natural Park and Site of Community Importance (SCI). It is located in the south-east of the municipality.
- Sierra de la Muela, Cabo Tiñoso and Roldán mountain, Natural Park, Site of Community Importance and Special Protection Area (SPA). It occurs in the south-west of the municipality.
- Sierra de la Fausilla, Special Protection Area. It is placed in the south of Escombreras district and between Cartagena and Calblanque Regional Park.
- Islands and Islets of the Mediterranean coast, including Grossa Island (belonging to the municipality of San Javier, Hormigas Islands, Palomas Islands and Escombreras Islands, some of them also designed as Special Protection Area.

=== Climate ===
Cartagena has a hot desert climate (Köppen climate classification: BWh), while the surrounding areas have a hot semi-arid climate (Köppen: BSh). Its location near the sea moderates the temperature, and annual precipitation typically does not surpass 300 mm (12 in). Cartagena has never recorded any temperature below freezing (below 0 °C (32 °F)) since records began. The annual average temperature goes up to around 19.2 °C (67 °F). The coldest month is January, with an average temperature of 12.7 °C (55 °F). In August, the warmest month, the average temperature is 27.0 °C (81 °F). The wind is an important climatic factor in the region.

Climate data for Cartagena 1991-2020 normals, extremes (1988-present)
Month	Jan	Feb	Mar	Apr	May	Jun	Jul	Aug	Sep	Oct	Nov	Dec	Year
Record high °C (°F)	25.6 (78.1)	25.6 (78.1)	29.4 (84.9)	27.7 (81.9)	31.9 (89.4)	36.9 (98.4)	38.3 (100.9)	41.5 (106.7)	34.0 (93.2)	33.9 (93.0)	28.8 (83.8)	24.7 (76.5)	41.5 (106.7)
Mean daily maximum °C (°F)	16.6 (61.9)	17.0 (62.6)	18.7 (65.7)	20.4 (68.7)	23.5 (74.3)	27.0 (80.6)	29.8 (85.6)	30.4 (86.7)	27.5 (81.5)	23.9 (75.0)	20.0 (68.0)	17.5 (63.5)	22.7 (72.8)
Daily mean °C (°F)	12.7 (54.9)	13.3 (55.9)	15.1 (59.2)	17.0 (62.6)	20.1 (68.2)	23.6 (74.5)	26.4 (79.5)	27.0 (80.6)	24.3 (75.7)	20.6 (69.1)	16.4 (61.5)	13.7 (56.7)	19.2 (66.5)
Mean daily minimum °C (°F)	8.9 (48.0)	9.7 (49.5)	11.4 (52.5)	13.6 (56.5)	16.7 (62.1)	20.2 (68.4)	23.0 (73.4)	23.7 (74.7)	21.0 (69.8)	17.2 (63.0)	12.8 (55.0)	9.9 (49.8)	15.7 (60.2)
Record low °C (°F)	1.3 (34.3)	1.9 (35.4)	2.9 (37.2)	5.6 (42.1)	7.4 (45.3)	13.7 (56.7)	18.4 (65.1)	17.9 (64.2)	14.5 (58.1)	9.3 (48.7)	4.4 (39.9)	1.4 (34.5)	1.3 (34.3)
Average precipitation mm (inches)	30.6 (1.20)	21.0 (0.83)	25.2 (0.99)	23.9 (0.94)	14.5 (0.57)	5.3 (0.21)	1.1 (0.04)	3.4 (0.13)	39.3 (1.55)	29.5 (1.16)	35.5 (1.40)	30.9 (1.22)	260.2 (10.24)
Average precipitation days (≥ 1 mm)	3.0	2.7	3.2	3.1	1.9	1.0	0.3	0.7	2.9	3.2	4.1	3.4	29.5
Average relative humidity (%)	70	70	70	69	66	67	68	70	71	72	70	71	70
Source: Agencia Estatal de Meteorologia (AEMET OpenData)

Climate data for Cartagena
Month	Jan	Feb	Mar	Apr	May	Jun	Jul	Aug	Sep	Oct	Nov	Dec	Year
Average sea temperature °C (°F)	14.8 (58.6)	14.4 (57.9)	14.6 (58.3)	16.6 (61.9)	18.9 (66.0)	22.0 (71.6)	24.7 (76.5)	25.9 (78.6)	24.4 (75.9)	22.0 (71.6)	19.3 (66.7)	16.6 (61.9)	19.5 (67.1)
Mean daily daylight hours	10.0	11.0	12.0	13.0	14.0	15.0	15.0	14.0	13.0	12.0	11.0	10.0	12.6
Average Ultraviolet index	2	3	5	7	8	9	10	9	7	5	3	2	5.8
Source: Weather Atlas

== Demographics ==
Historical population
Year	Pop.	±%
1842	33,593	—
1857	59,618	+77.5%
1877	75,901	+27.3%
1887	85,753	+13.0%
1900	103,373	+20.5%
1910	102,519	−0.8%
1920	101,613	−0.9%
1930	102,705	+1.1%
1940	115,468	+12.4%
1950	110,979	−3.9%
1960	122,387	+10.3%
1970	143,466	+17.2%
1981	167,936	+17.1%
1991	168,023	+0.1%
2001	184,686	+9.9%
2011	215,757	+16.8%
2021	215,826	+0.0%
Source: INE

As of 2024, the population of Cartagena is 219,235, of whom 49.8% are male and 50.2% are female, compared to the nationwide average of 49.0% and 51.0% respectively. People under 16 years old make up 16.8% of the population, and people over 65 years old make up 18.4%, compared to the nationwide average of 14.3% and 20.4% respectively.

As of 2024, the foreign-born population is 33,305, equal to 15.2% of the total population. The 5 largest foreign nationalities are Moroccans (13,522), Ecuadorians (3,289), Colombians (2,447), Brits (2,052) and Ukrainians (1,033).

Foreign population by country of birth (2024)
Country	Population
Morocco	13,522
Ecuador	3,289
Colombia	2,447
United Kingdom	2,052
Ukraine	1,033
Venezuela	849
France	712
Argentina	672
Romania	660
Bolivia	563
Peru	453
Germany	443
Paraguay	436
China	428
Cuba	333

== Districts ==
Map of the districts of Cartagena

The municipality has 24 districts, known as diputaciones (councils). The origin of this administrative structure has its date in the beginning of the 18th century when the population was increasing and the municipality was becoming less tractable. The districts are:

- Cartagena Casco: This is the district where the main town (also named Cartagena) is located and is located in the south of the municipality. Its population consisted of 57,001 in 2019.
- San Antonio Abad: It is located in the south of the municipality and adjoins Cartagena Casco in its south and Canteras in its west. The number of inhabitants was 44,882 in 2019.
- El Plan: It adjoins La Magdalena in its west and Lentiscar in its east. There were 35,974 residents in 2019.
- Rincón de San Ginés: It is located in the southeast end of the municipality. Its population consisted of 10,214 people in 2019.
- Canteras: This coastal district is placed in the south of the territory and faces the Mediterranean Sea in its south. It is also adjoining to Perín in its west and San Antonio Abad in its east. There were 10,167 people living in 2019.
- El Algar: It is located in the east of Cartagena and adjoins Lentiscar in its north. The number of inhabitants consisted in 7,961.
- Santa Lucía: It is located in the south of the municipality and faces the Mediterranean Sea in its south.
- La Palma: It is located in the north of the municipality. It shares borders with Lentiscar in its east.
- Pozo Estrecho: It is placed in the north of Cartagena and shares borders with La Palma in its east and with El Albujón in its west. There were 5,149 people who resided in the area in 2019.
- La Aljorra: This district occupies the northwestern end of the municipality. The number of inhabitants equaled to 4,962 people in 2019.
- La Magdalena: It occupies part of the west of the municipality and adjoins La Aljorra in its north. Its population consisted of 3,893 in 2019.
- Alumbres: It is located in the southeast quarter of Cartagena.
- Albujón: It is placed in the northwest of Cartagena and shares borders with La Aljorra in its west.
- San Félix: It is located in the approximate centre of Cartagena and is adjacent to Lentiscar in its northeast. The territory was inhabited by 2,694 people in 2019.
- Santa Ana: This district is placed in the northern half of Cartagena. It adjoins Pozo Estrecho in its north. Its population consisted of 2,501 people in 2019.
- El Beal: The territory is located in the east of the municipality and shares borders with Rincón de San Ginés in its south. There were 2,342 residents present in 2019.
- Lentiscar: This district is placed in the northeast end of Cartagena. There were 2,022 residents in 2019.
- Perín: It is located in the south of the municipality and adjoins the Mediterranean Sea in its south and Los Puertos in its west. Perín was home to 1,591 people in 2019.
- Los Puertos: It occupies the southwest end, but also part of the inner west that is not the end of the municipality and is adjoining Campo Nubla in its west. This was inhabited by 1,349 people in 2019.
- Miranda: This district is placed in the northwest quarter of Cartagena. It shares borders with Pozo Estrecho in its northeast and El albujón in its northwest.
- Hondón: It is located in the southeast quarter and is adjoining San Félix in its south. The district was inhabited by 1,117 people in 2019.
- Campo Nubla: This district occupies part of the west end of the municipality. The territory was home to 203 people in 2019.
- Los Médicos: It is placed in the northern half of the territory. The district shares borders with La Palma and Pozo Estrecho in its north.
- Escombreras: It is located in the south of Cartagena. There were 9 people living in the area in 2019.

== Administration ==
As generally in Spain, the governors of the municipalities are indirectly elected on the day of municipal and regional elections, every four years. The D'Hondt system is used for allocating the governors from the votes. The body of all the elected councilors is named pleno and has 27 members in Cartagena. The head governor has the name of alcalde (feminine, alcaldesa). Since Cartagena is inhabited by more than 5,000 people, there is also a junta de gobierno local, the members are selected by the alcalde from the pleno. Currently, there are 9 members in the governing cabinet. Four members of the cabinet belong to Partido Popular party, one to Ciudadanos and there are also four nonpartisan politicians, including the alcaldesa, who belonged to PSOE (Partido Socialista Obrero Español) party but were expelled of the party because they had made an agreement with Partido Popular party and Ciudadanos in order to compose the pleno.

Governing party
1991–1995	Partido Socialista Obrero Español (PSOE)
1995–1999	Partido Popular
1999–2003	Partido Popular
2003–2007	Partido Popular
2007–2011	Partido Popular
2011–2015	Partido Popular
2015–2019	Movimiento Ciudadano and PSOE (successively)
2019–2023	PSOE and Partido Popular (successively)

There are also committees named juntas vecinales in some localities and districts. Administrative centres are also available for inhabitants who don't live in the main town and the can perform some administrative processes there. They are located in some districts and localities and name is omitas.

== Economy ==
Economy activities related to energy are among the main ones in the municipality. They are located in Valle de Escombreras. This spot, which is a valley, is located in a district named Escombreras that is placed in the south of the municipality and of 5–10 km from the main locality by its west. Agriculture is another noteworthy activity in Cartagena and 37.9% of the territory consisted of crop lands in 2017. The most widely grown products are melons, lettuces, potatoes, lemons and almonds. 52.77% of the agreements occurred in this sector and 42.83% of the workers were hired as labourers in 2012. Shipbuilding has less weight than some centuries ago, but it is still moderately important. This is performed in the port of Cartagena, the main locality of the municipality. Plastic production is also performed, specifically in the northwest of the territory. The tertiary sector has risen during the last decades, specifically tourism and hotel industry. 14,12% of the agreements in the municipality were aimed at waiters in 2012.

== Main sights ==
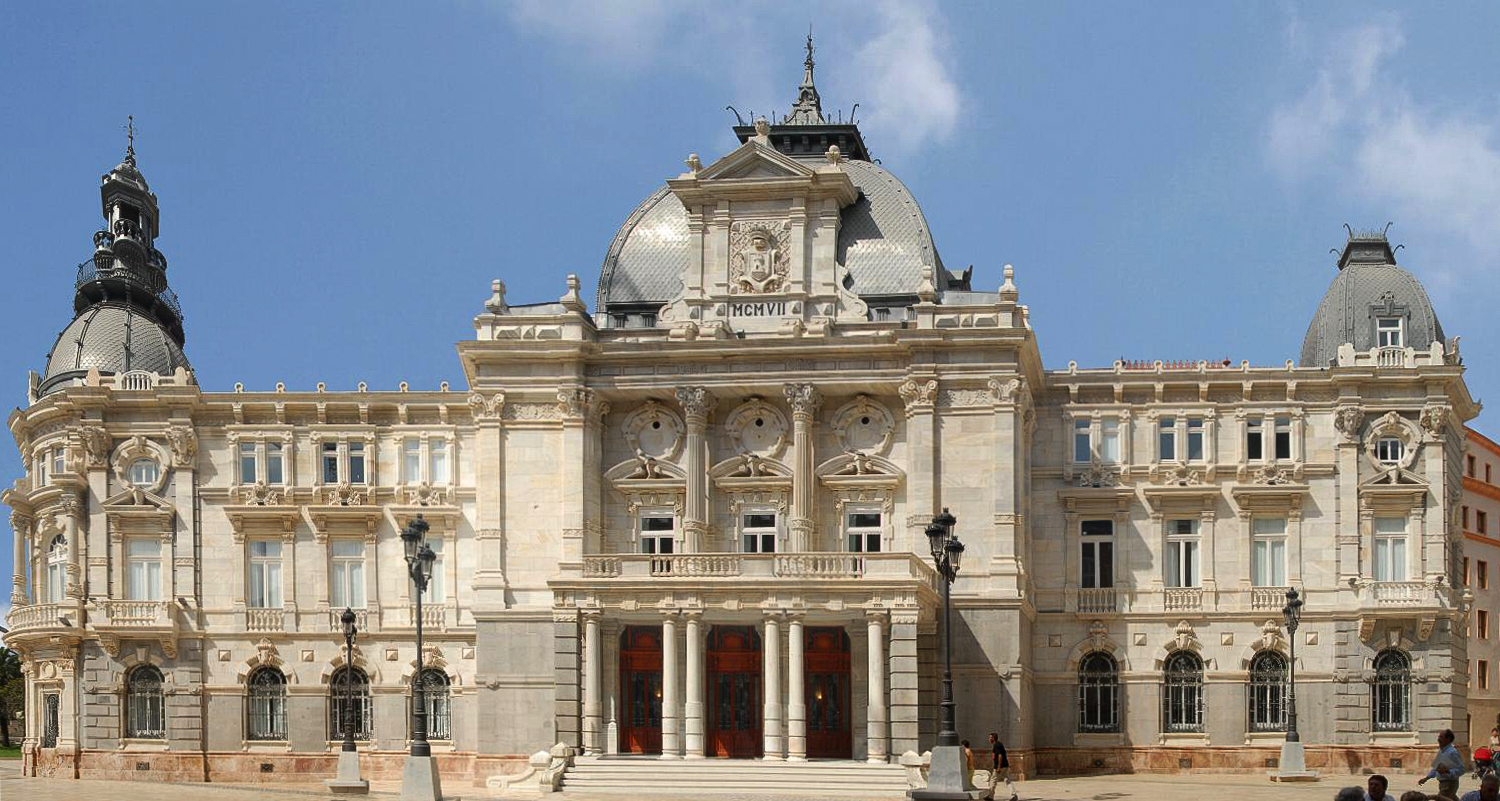
Cartagena's City Hall

Thanks to its position on the Mediterranean, Cartagena has been inhabited by many different cultures, which have left their mark on its cultural heritage.

The "Cartagena, Port of Cultures" initiative allows visitors to experience a wide range of activities and visits, discovering the culture and history of the city. It is one of several projects to energize the tourist possibilities.

=== Archaeological sites ===
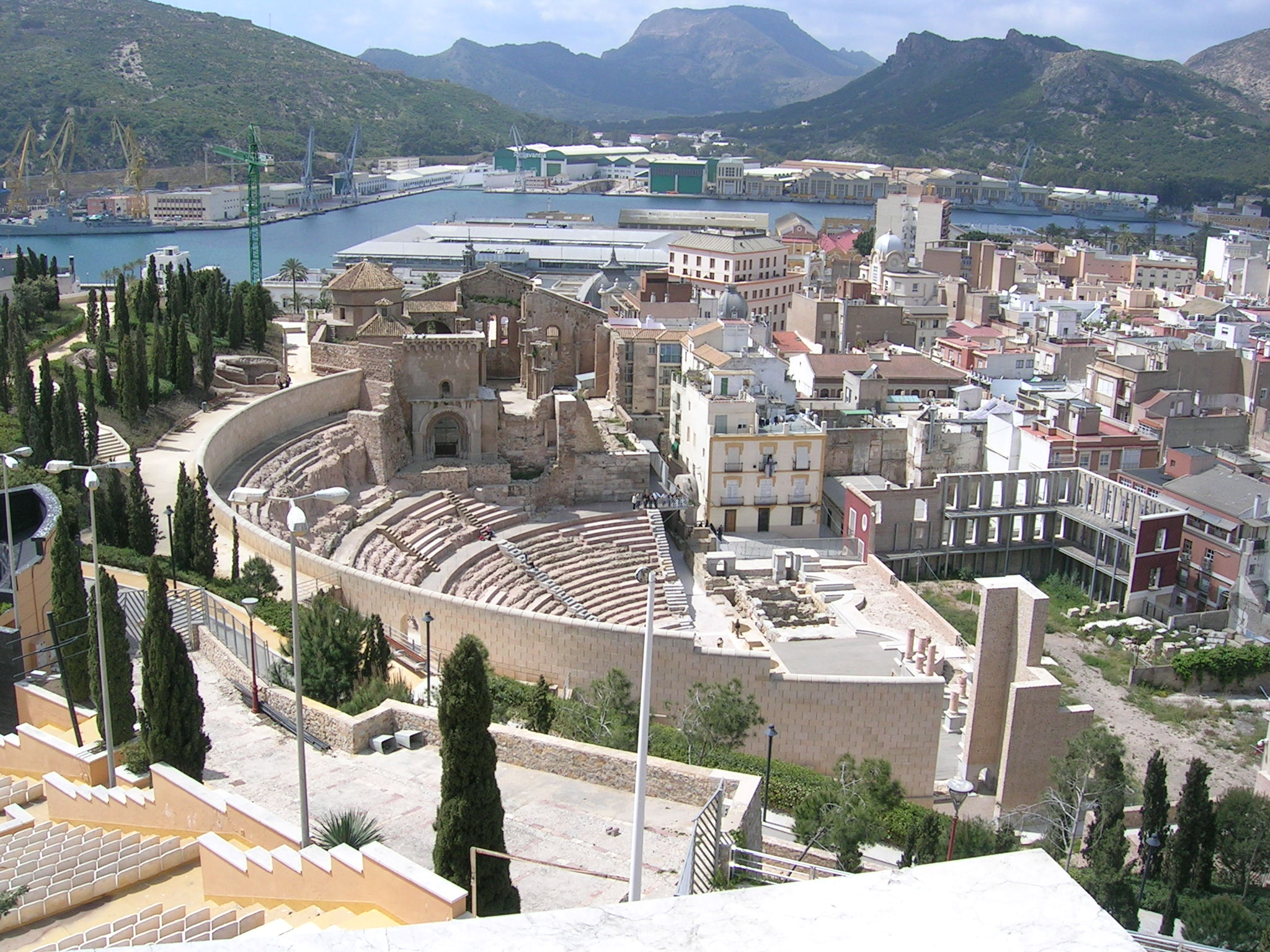
The Roman Theatre of Carthago Nova and Cathedral ruins of Cartagena

Although there are some ruins from the Carthaginian period, like the remains of the Punic rampart (built in 227 BC with the foundation of the city), most of its oldest monuments date from the time of the Roman Empire when Cartagena flourished. The archaeologist Blanca Roldán studied this Punic Rampart and other Punic remains, especially on the Molinete Hill. Among its numerous Roman remains, the recently restored Roman theatre of Carthago Nova is prominent and is one of the city's landmarks. Work on it started at the end of the 2nd century BC. The Roman Theatre Museum was recently officially inaugurated. In Roman Republican Times, the mines near Cartagena provided silver and lead for all the Roman Empire.

Other Roman remains can be found in several buildings and interpretative centres, including the Roman Colonnade, the House of Fortune, the decumanus/cardo and the Augusteum. The Torre Ciega was built by the Romans for burials; it formed part of the Necropolis.

The Roman Amphitheatre (1st century AD) was sited where the now-abandoned Bullring was built, but only some of the surrounding walls and part of the rooms under the stands are still visible. Recent work is revealing more evidence.

Besides the Roman heritage, archaeological sights include the remains of the Santa María la Vieja Cathedral, which was irreversibly destroyed during the Spanish Civil War. It dates from the end of the 13th century. The decorated floor of a Roman house of the 1st century BC can be found in the crypt.

A Byzantine rampart can be found, close to the Roman Theatre and the Cathedral.

The Concepción Castle (now Centre for the Interpretation of the History of Cartagena) was reconstructed in the 13th century using large structures from the Amphitheatre. Apart from the Roman Theatre Museum, there are also two important archaeological museums: the Municipal Archaeological Museum and the recently opened Arqua (National Museum of Maritime Archaeology).

=== Baroque and Neo-classical buildings ===
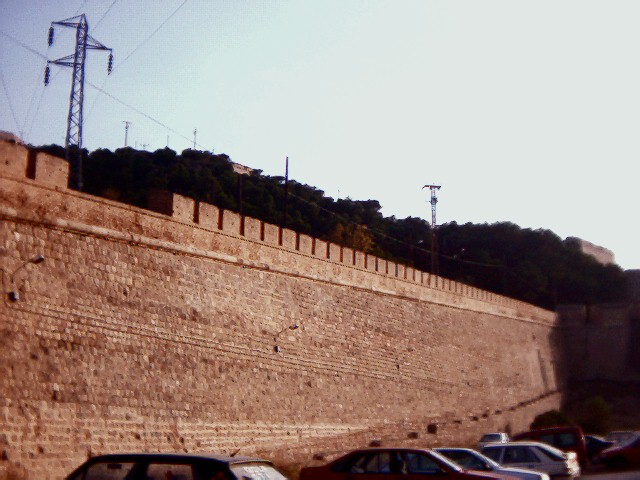
Original Charles III rampart

The Campus Muralla del Mar, an old military hospital, was one of the first works carried out after the transformation of the city into the main Spanish naval base in the Mediterranean, and is now the seat of the Polytechnic University. In the vicinity, there is the Autopsy Theatre, which is where anatomy classes used to be given. Rehabilitation for tourism provides for the interpretation of the nearby buildings at the time of their construction.

These buildings and several other baroque or neo-classical buildings demonstrate the military importance of Cartagena. These include the Charles III Rampart, the Castillo de San Julián, the Arsenal, the Midshipmen's Barracks (academy and naval barracks), the Naval Headquarter Palace (built in 1740 and subsequently rebuilt) and the Artillery Headquarters, which also houses the Military Museum. Among the Baroque or Neo-classical Churches in Cartagena are El Carmen, Santo Domingo and Santa Maria de Gracia.

The austere facade of the Molina House hides the Centre of Arts and Craft.

=== Modernist and Eclectic buildings ===
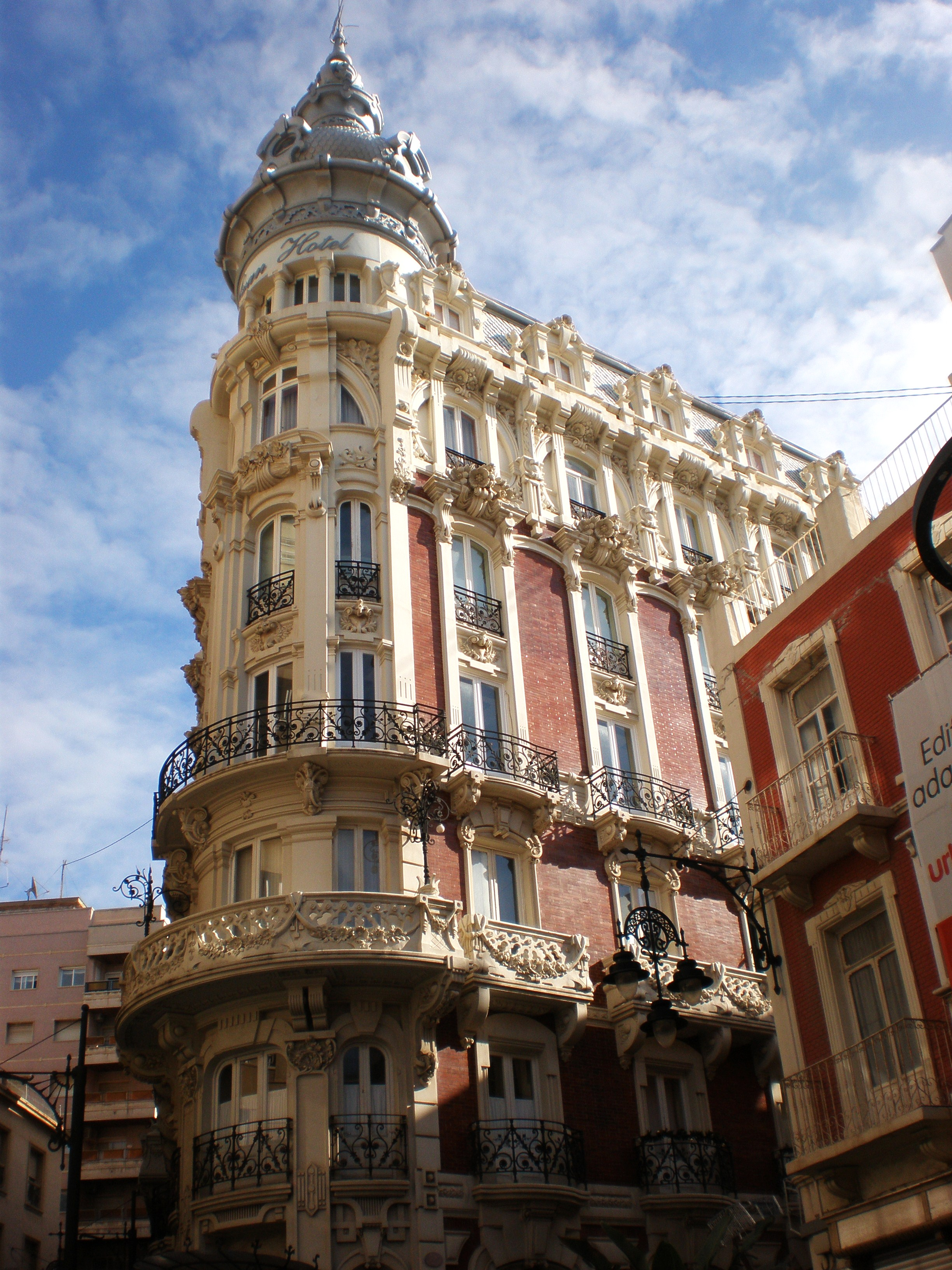
The Gran Hotel

Cartagena is home to numerous Art Nouveau buildings from the early 20th century, when a bourgeoisie settled in the city due to the growth of the local mining industry. Many prominent building were designed by Victor Beltri, the prolific Modernist architect of the city. These buildings include the City Hall, the Grand Hotel, the Casino (all of them among the city's landmarks).

The Railway Station has some outstanding iron doors and columns on its facade, and inside can still be seen the original ticket office, door frame, ceiling, and lamps. Other modernist or eclectic houses include the Clares House, the Aguirre Palace (which houses the Regional Museum of Modern Art, or MURAM), the Cervantes House (relatively big in comparison with other modernist buildings), the Llagostera House, the Pedreño Palace, the Dorda House, the Zapata House and the Urban Expansion Company House.

Calle Mayor (High Street) is the major pedestrian and commercial street of the city, full of boutiques and bars with typical "tapas".

The Caridad church is one of the most important churches in the city, since it is dedicated to the patron of Cartagena, Nuestra Señora de Caridad. The interior is dominated by a dome, similar to the Pantheon of Agrippa, in Rome. There are also several outstanding sculptures by the famous Murcian sculptor Francisco Salzillo and his school.

=== Modern sights ===
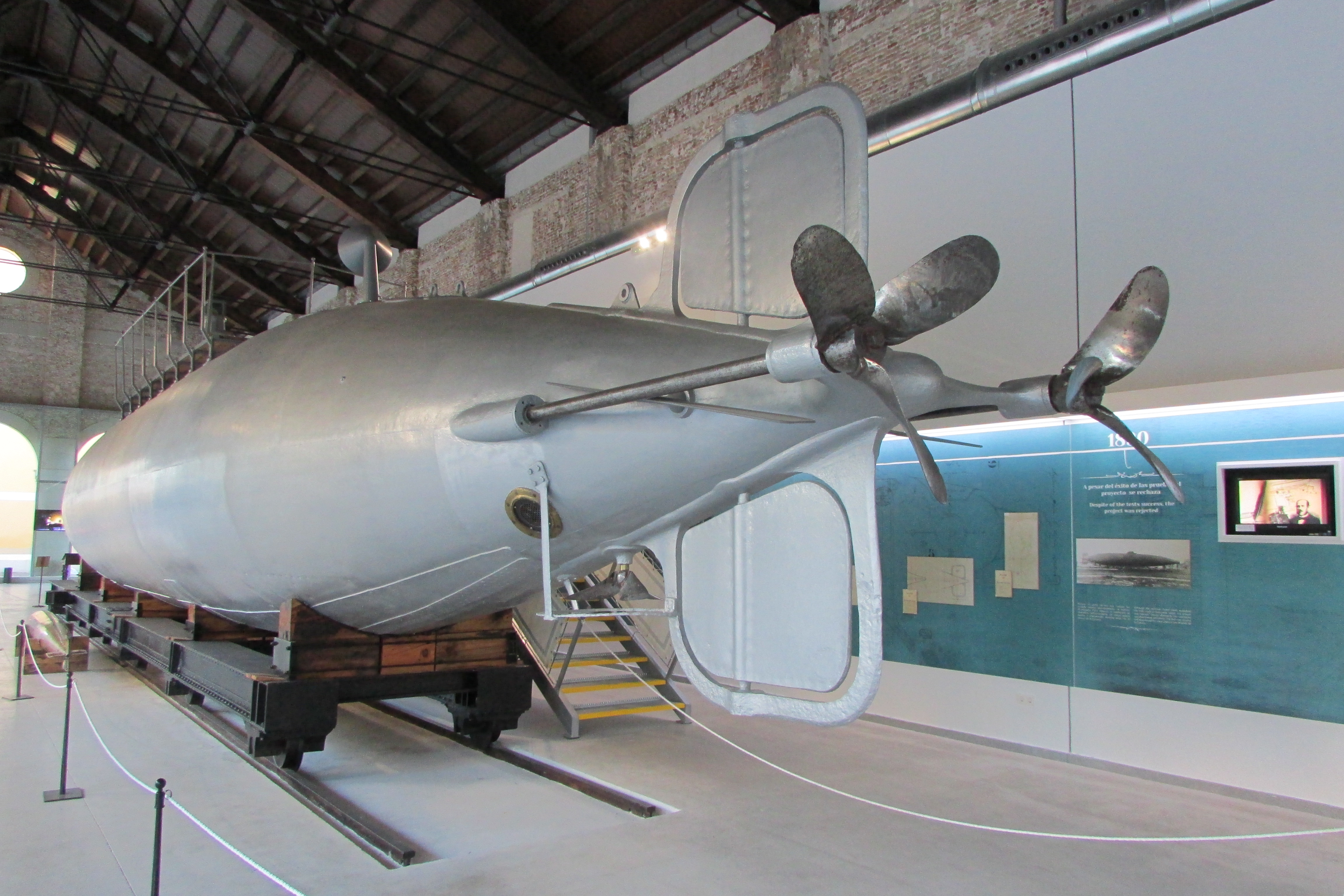
The Peral Submarine in 2015 in the new Naval Museum of Cartagena

The Civil War Shelter-Museum is based on the galleries excavated out the Concepción hill (site of the Castle) to serve as air-raid shelters during the Spanish Civil War. Many naval and military attractions belong to this era, such as the Naval Museum and the world-famous Peral Submarine invented by Isaac Peral (born in Cartagena) that was launched in 1888 as one of the first submarines ever. It was displayed on Cartagena's harbour promenade until its move to the Naval Museum, after a full restoration.

The Monument to the Heroes of Santiago de Cuba and Cavite (1923) is a war memorial erected in honour of the Spanish sailors who died in combat with the US Navy in waters off Cavite and Santiago off the Philippine and Cuban coasts.

Other attractions include the Lift-Gangway near the former Bullring and the Concepción Hill, the Regional Assembly (the Parliament of the Region of Murcia) whose facade includes architectural influences from the Renaissance while maintaining a modernist air (typical in the Levant), and the Carmen Conde-Antonio Moliner Museum that reconstructs the atmosphere in which these poets from Cartagena created some of their most important works.

=== Beaches ===
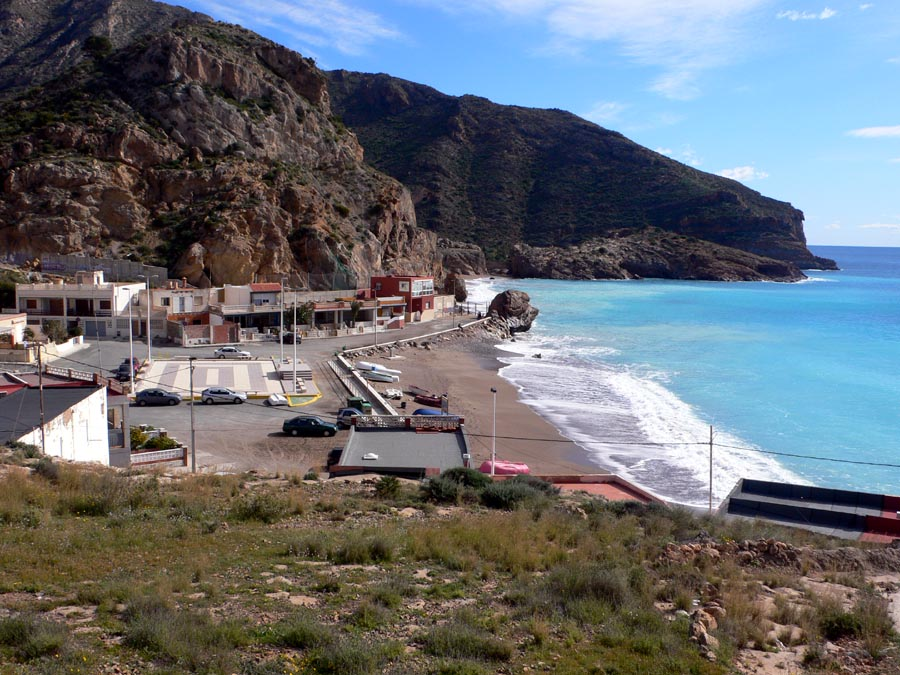
Public beach at El Portús

Although the city itself is only a port, within the city limits lies part of La Manga del Mar Menor (the other part belonging to the municipality of San Javier) which encompasses the Mar Menor. Cartagena also includes part of the Murcian Mediterranean Coast. Cartagena holds the distinction of being the Spanish city with the most beaches (10) certified "Q for Quality" by the ICTE (Instituto para la Calidad Turística Española). These beaches are: Cala Cortina, Islas Menores, Playa Honda beach, Mar de Cristal, Cala del Pino, Cavanna beach, Barco Perdido beach, El Galúa beach, Levante beach and La Gola beach.

El Portús beach is adjacent to the naturist camping site, so nude bathing is practiced on this beach.

== Healthcare ==
Cartagena is in Healtharea II (Cartagena) in Region of Murcia. In this area there are 17 subareas, and 13 are in the municipality. Two hospitals are included in the region and both are placed in the municipality. Cartagena is also home to 30 consultorios (primary care health centres with fewer functions than the centros de salud) and 12 centros de salud.

== Transport ==
Cartagena is served by the Autopista AP-7 linking it to towns and cities further up the Mediterranean coast, and Autovía A-30 to Murcia. The Chinchilla–Cartagena railway reached Cartagena railway station in 1863 and the current station opened in 1903. It will be the future terminus of the Madrid–Levante high-speed rail network. The narrow-gauge Cartagena–Los Nietos line serves commuters between Cartagena and La Unión and Los Nietos to the east.

Bus facilities are also present in Cartagena by the urban bus service. There are lines to localities of the municipalities and adjacent municipalities such as La Unión and Torre-Pacheco.

The nearest airports are Región de Murcia International Airport, located 30 km (19 mi) north and Alicante Airport, located 121 km (75 mi) north east of the city.

== Education ==
There are nine early childhood and primary education public centres in the main town and five secondary centres. Four concertados (semiprivate) centres are also placed in the territory and they include primary as well as secondary education. 38 primary education centres are located in the other districts as well as 10 secondary education centres. A special education centre can be found in the district El Plan, that is in the east of the western half of Cartagena.

A public university named Universidad Politécnica de Cartagena (UPCT), a centre of the public distance university UNED, a campus of the private university Universidad Católica de Murcia (UCAM) and a private university, which name is ISEN, occur in the municipality. UPCT includes degrees related to engineering and architecture, in UNED there are 28 degrees, in UCAM people can choose among 9 degrees and in ISEN 9 degrees are taught.

There are also three vocational education centres (CIFP) in the municipality, but vocational degrees are taught in some secondary education centres (IES). The main town is home to a centre of a national public organisation about language teaching. English, French, German, Arabic and Italian are taught from A1 level to C2.

They town council has an organisation named Universidad Popular de Cartagena where several courses are taught and courses for access to middle vocational degrees, higher vocational degrees and university degrees are included. A centre for adult education can also be found in the main town where people can study elemental contents, secondary education for adults, the contents of the secondary education examination, the contents of the entry examination for CFGS (higher level vocational education), the contents of the entry examination for university degrees, Spanish, English, and a FPB (basic vocational education) for Computing.

== Sports ==
Probably the most remarkable element in regard to sports is Fútbol Club Cartagena (F. C. Cartagena) team, which is in Segunda División, the second level of the Spanish football league system. Another sport team is Futsal Cartagena, which is in Segunda División during most seasons. A successful team is UCAM Cartagena Tenis de Mesa.

Other sports that are played in the municipality are basketball, at Club Basket Cartagena; handball, whose most noteworthy team is C.A.B. Cartagena; and badminton, at UPCT Bádminton Cartagena.

An international competition of aesthetic group gymnastics was held along with IFAGG (International Federation of Aesthetic Group Gymnastics) in Cartagena from 17 May to 19.

In regard to sports facilities, the two main ones for the average citizen are two pavilions, whose names are Pabellón Central or Wsell de Guimbarda and Piscina Municipal, but there are also pavilions and sports facilities in the districts. A stadium can also be found in the main city area.

== Festivals ==
These are the most known festivals of the municipality:

- Cartagena's Holy Week are solemn religious processions which are unique in Spain for their discipline which reflects the city's naval tradition.
- Carthaginians and Romans, declared an item of National Tourist Interest. The main festivities of the city, a colourful Carthaginian and Roman parade full of events that recall the Punic Wars and the conquest of the city by both Empires. Held over the final ten days of September.
- Cruces de Mayo: This festivity consists mainly in setting flowered Christian crosses with revere purposes.

=== Festivities in the districts ===
- Patron saint festivities: Different patron saints are venerated and different festivities are held throughout the municipality. There are activities that are more or less frequent in these festivities such as little processions (festive religious parades) and romerías (religious festive acts that consist in a little procession where a statue of the Virgin or Christ is carried and end in a large festive people meeting at an isolated church).

== Notable people ==
- Hasdrubal the Fair (c. 270 BC – 221 BC), military leader and general
- Licinianus of Cartagena (554–602), archbishop of the Diocese Cartaginense
- Hazim al-Qartayanni (1184–1211), poet
- Juan Fernández (1528–1599), mariner and explorer of the Pacific Ocean and Polynesia
- Pepita Inglés (1910–1937) anarcho-syndicalist fighter and member of the Durruti Column during the Spanish Civil War.
- Sebastián Raval (1550–1604), composer
- Antonio de Escaño (1750–1814), army and naval officer
- Baltasar Hidalgo de Cisneros (1755–1829), naval officer
- Isidoro Máiquez (1768–1820), actor, painted by Francisco de Goya
- Isaac Peral (1851–1895), engineer, naval officer and designer of the Peral Submarine
- Marcos Jiménez de la Espada (1831–1898), zoologist, geographer, historian, herpetologist, explorer and writer
- Juan Luis Beigbeder y Atienza (1888–1957), military and political leader
- Luis Calandre (1890–1961), physician
- Antonio Oliver (1903–1968), poet, poeta pertaining to the Generación del 27
- Carmen Conde (1907–1996), writer
- Alfonso Pérez Sánchez (1935–2010), art historian and director of the Museo del Prado from 1983 to 1991
- Joaquín Navarro-Valls (b. 1936), doctor, journalist and writer
- Arturo Pérez-Reverte (b. 1951), novelist and journalist, member of the Real Academia Española
- Dolores Soler-Espiauba (b. 1935), novelist
- Federico Trillo (b. 1952), politician affiliated with the Partido Popular, ex-president of the Congreso de los Diputados and Spanish Ministry of Defence and current ambassador of Spain to the United Kingdom
- José Ortega Cano (b. 1953), bullfighter
- José Antonio Sánchez Baíllo (b. 1953), painter and engraver
- Eduardo Zaplana (b. 1956), politician affiliated with the Partido Popular
- Charris (b. 1962), painter
- José Carlos Martínez (b. 1969), dancer and choreographer
- Robert Sanchez (b. 1997), professional footballer for Chelsea

== Twin towns – sister cities ==
Cartagena is twinned with:

- Terni, Italy
- Carthage, Tunisia

== See also ==
- Campo de Cartagena
- Navantia Spanish Shipbuilding Industry
- Spanish Navy
- Isaac Peral Cartagena inventor of the electric submarine
- List of municipalities in the Region of Murcia

== Bibliography ==
- Frey Sánchez, Antonio Vicente (2003). "Cartagena en el marco de la conquista del "Sarq Al-Andalus"" (PDF). Mastia: Revista del Museo Arqueológico Municipal de Cartagena (2). Cartagena: Museo Arqueológico Municipal de Cartagena: 251–260. ISSN 1579-3303.
- Jiménez Alcázar, Juan Francisco (2015). "Castilla y el mar Mediterráneo: encuentros y desencuentros en la Baja Edad Media". Intus - Legere Historia. 5 (2). Viña del Mar: Universidad Adolfo Ibáñez: 7–33. ISSN 0718-5456.
- Ruiz Valderas, Elena (2004). "Cartagena arqueológica: un ejemplo de convivencia histórica". In Domínguez Arranz, Almudena (ed.). Jornadas de Arqueología en Suelo Urbano. Huesca, 19 y 20 de marzo de 2003. Huesca: Instituto de Estudios Altoaragoneses. ISBN 84-8127-152-7.
