= Charris =

Spanish painter (born 1962)

Ángel Mateo Charris known as Charris (born 1962 in Cartagena, Murcia) is a Spanish painter. His work is included in the figurative line that has been called "neometaphysical", which also includes his contemporaries such as Gonzalo Sicre, Joel Mestre and Dis Berlin.

== Biography ==
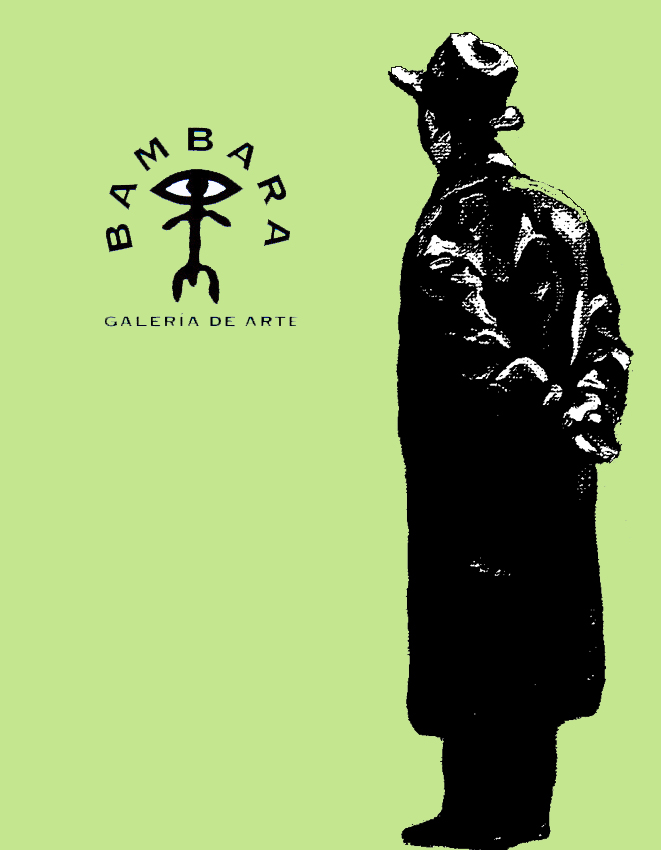
Brochure presenting Bambara Cartagena Gallery

Charris was born in Cartagena on May 10, 1962, and graduated from the San Carlos Fine Arts College (Valencia) in 1985. During the 1980s he participated in various collective exhibitions. In 1988 he first travelled to New York, where he experienced the paintings of Edward Hopper and the artists of the Hudson River School. In 1989 he was awarded the Young Photographers National Competition from the Spanish Youth Institute.

In 1997, with Gonzalo Sicre, he edited the book In the Footsteps of Hopper. In 1999, the Valencian Institute of Modern Art dedicated a major exhibition to Charris in its Centro del Carmen.

== Works ==
Charris' style is heavily influenced by comics, pop art, comic visual language, noir cinema, and other artists including Edward Hopper, Léon Spilliaert, Edward Ruscha, Mark Rothko, Morandi, and Giorgio de Chirico. His works also reference art history, literature (especially travel literature), and approaches to postmodernism.

His work is in collections such as Fundación Argentaria, Coca-Cola Foundation, Bancaixa Collection, Collection Testimoni La Caixa, Museo Nacional Centro de Arte Reina Sofia, the IVAM, and the Artium of Vitoria.

In May 2010, a key monographic exhibition about his work, Who's afraid of the Turner Prize, took place at the T20 Gallery in Murcia.
