= Basilica of Nuestra Señora de la Caridad, Cartagena =

Roman Catholic church in Cartagena, Spain

Coordinates: 37°36′11″N 0°59′01″W

The Basilica of Nuestra Señora de la Caridad stands as one of the most significant churches in Cartagena, Spain, due to its dedication to the city's patron, Nuestra Señora de la Caridad. The interior features a prominent dome reminiscent of the Pantheon of Agrippa in Rome. Additionally, the basilica houses several exceptional sculptures crafted by the renowned Murcian sculptor Francisco Salzillo and his workshop.

Pope Benedict XVI decreed this shrine to the status of Minor Basilica on 23 March 2012 with notarized authorization via the Holy Office.
