= San Antonio Abad, Cartagena =

San Antonio Abad
- Municipality district
- Location in Spain San Antonio Abad (Spain)
- Coordinates: 37°37′34.0981″N 0°59′22.492″W
- Country: Spain
- Autonomous community: Murcia
- Province: Province of Murcia
- Comarca: Campo de Cartagena
- Judicial district: Cartagena
- Municipality: Cartagena

Government
  - Mayor: Ana Belén Castejón Hernández

Area
  - Total: 9.738 km^{2} (3.760 sq mi)

Population (2020-01-01)
  - Total: 44,882
  - Density: 4,609/km^{2} (11,940/sq mi)
- Time zone: UTC+1 (CET)
  - Summer (DST): UTC+2 (CEST)
- Postal code: 30205 (West), 30300 (North-east end) 30310 (North)
- Dialing code: (+34) 968

San Antonio Abad is a district of the Spanish municipality Cartagena. It is located in the south of the territory, has an area of 9.738 km^{2} and a population of 45,335.

The district has a coastal area in its south-west and a cave and paleonthologic site named Cueva de los Aviones is occurs in San Antonio Abad.

According to the Instituto Nacional de Estadística, there are three main neighbourhoods in the district: Barrio Peral, San Antonio Abad and Barrio de la Concepción. San Antonio Abad is in the north-east and consists of four neighbourhoods: Urbanización Media Sala, which is the one in the most north and is home to 1640 people; Urbanización Mediterráneo, where 5793 people live; Urbanización Nueva Cartagena (literally, "city new new city new"), which is inhabited by 3398 people and San Antonio Abad, which is the most in the south and has a population of 13,448. Barrio de la Concepción is located in the east and consists of Barrio de la Concepción, where 4,053 live and Barriada de Villalba, which has a population of 1,021. Barrio Peral is in the north-east end and is home to 15,805 people.

The northern part of the district is in an urban continuity with the main city (Cartagena). The eastern part is also united with the main city, but in a lesser extent.

== History ==
There has been human presence since the Roman Iberian Peninsula era. The first documentary reference that has been found dates back to 1530. San Antón obtained an own municipality in 1842 but it existence ceased the following year.

== Demographics ==
9.8% inhabitants are foreigners – 1.67% come from other country of Europe, 5.488% are Africans, 2.27% are Americans and 0.366% are Asians. The table below shows the population trend of the 21st century by its five-year periods.

	2001	2006	2011	2016
Population	30,512	43,021	44,312	44,789
