= El Plan, Cartagena =

El Plan
- Municipality district
- Location in Spain El Plan (Spain)
- Coordinates: 37°38′25.7034″N 1°0′30.7006″W
- Country: Spain
- Autonomous community: Murcia
- Province: Province of Murcia
- Comarca: Campo de Cartagena
- Judicial district: Cartagena
- Municipality: Cartagena

Government
  - Mayor: Ana Belén Castejón Hernández

Area
  - Total: 13.165 km^{2} (5.083 sq mi)

Population (2020-01-01)
  - Total: 35,974
  - Density: 2,732.5/km^{2} (7,077.3/sq mi)
- Time zone: UTC+1 (CET)
  - Summer (DST): UTC+2 (CEST)
- Postal code: 30310
- Dialing code: (+34) 968

El Plan is a district of the Spanish municipality Cartagena. It is located in the east of the western half of the municipality, has an area of 13.165 km^{2}, and was inhabited by 36,080 people in 2020.

The localities of the district are La Guía, which is in the north-west and is home to 122 people; Polígono de Santa Ana, where 7154 live; El Plan, which is inhabited by 220 people; Los Gabatos, which is placed in the south-western quarter and has a population of 5626, Barriada Hispanoamérica, which is also located in the south-western quarter and is home to 3865 people; Los Dolores, which is placed in the southern half and is inhabited by 7751 people; Urbanización Castillitos, which is located in the south and has a population of 1384 people; Los Barreros, which is also placed in the south and is home to 7030 people and Barriada Cuatro Santos, which is placed in the south-east end and is inhabited by 2573 people.

The district is in an urban continuity with the main city and the northern neighbourhoods of San Antonio Abad district.

== Demographics ==
7.857% inhabitants are foreigners – 0.848% come from other country of Europe, 5,6% are Africans, 11.14% are Americans and 0,285% are Asians. The table below shows the population trends of the 21st century by its five-year periods.

	2001	2006	2011	2016
Population	30,512	43,021	44,312	44,789

== Main sights ==
- El Castillito: it was built in 1900. It has two stages and its outside walls are red in the upper stage and whitish in the lower stage. A remarkable feature of the building is the presence of two cylindrical towers which are adjacent to the main body.
- El Retiro: it started its existence in 1900.
- Torre Llagostera: it was built in the first two decades of the 20th century.
- Casa Barceló: it was built in 1916.

== Festivities ==
- Festivity in Los Dolores: it takes place during the first third of September. Some activities such as revere flower placement to the virgin takes place during this festive period.
- Festivity in Barriada Hispanoamérica: it is held in the October.
