= History of Cartagena, Spain =

The History of Cartagena is rich and diverse and dates back to prehistoric times. Located in the southeastern part of Spain within the Region of Murcia, the city has been a focal point of human settlement since ancient periods, with archaeological evidence indicating the presence of Homo species over a million years ago. Known for its strategic port, Cartagena has played significant roles throughout history.

It may have been originally Mastia, but it was founded or refounded around 227 BC by the Carthaginian military leader Hasdrubal the Fair as the Carthaginian city of Qart-Hadast to its transformation under Roman rule as Carthago Nova, capital of the province of Carthaginensis. With the rest of the surrounding region it fell to the barbarian Visigoths although it was for a while occupied by the Byzantine Empire that made it the capital of their province Spania. After the Visigoths retook Cartagena it sank into an obscurity in which it remained during the subsequent Muslim rule.

It fell to Castile in 1245 and in 1270 became the center of the early Castilian navy. Much of the historical significance of Cartagena stemmed from its coveted defensive port, one of the most important in the western Mediterranean. Cartagena has been the capital of the Spanish Mediterranean fleet since the arrival of the Bourbons in the 18th century. Partly due to the development of mining in the 19th century it became a left wing stronghold, starting the Cantonal Rebellion in 1873 and in the Spanish Civil War acting as the headquarters of the Spanish Republican Navy and being the last city to fall to the Nationalists. It is still an important naval seaport, the main military haven of Spain, and is home to a large naval shipyard.

== Prehistory ==
There is evidence of the presence of individuals belonging to the genus Homo in the cave Cueva Victoria 1,300,000 years ago. This cave is located in the southeastern quarter of Cartagena.

Remains of Neanderthal individuals of the Mousterian culture were found in the Cave of los Aviones. This place is located close to Cartagena. There were also remains of Neanderthals belonging to the Mousterian culture in the Cueva Bermeja, which is located in the southwestern quarter of the municipality.

At the southeast corner of the municipality remains of humans of the Upper Paleolithic were discovered. The paleontological sites are the Abrigo de Los Déntoles cove, the Cueva de Los Mejillones, and the Cabezo de San Ginés (hill). The West of the municipality was also the scene of human activity in that period. Concrete evidence of this are the caves Cueva del Caballo and Cueva Bermeja.

The southeast end of Cartagena was inhabited again during the Mesolithic. Important points are the Cueva de los Pájaros and Cueva de los Mejillones (caves). Neolithic components such as ceramic shards have been found.

The southeast of Cartagena was again inhabited during the Neolithic. The sites are Las Amoladeras and Calblanque. The south of the Alumbres district was also inhabited during that period. The archaeological site is located in the Cerro del Gorguel (hill) and in it remains of a characteristic Neolithic hamlet were discovered.

The reasons for the dearth of human presence and structures in this municipality during the Neolithic period were the lack of rainfall and the absence of water courses. During the Bronze Age there was a similar situation.

The Argaric civilization inhabited the southeast of the Iberian Peninsula (Región de Murcia and Almería) during the Bronze Age. Nevertheless, they did not significantly occupy this municipality, there were few structures belonging to them and they had little relevance here. They lived in the northwest.

== Ancient history ==
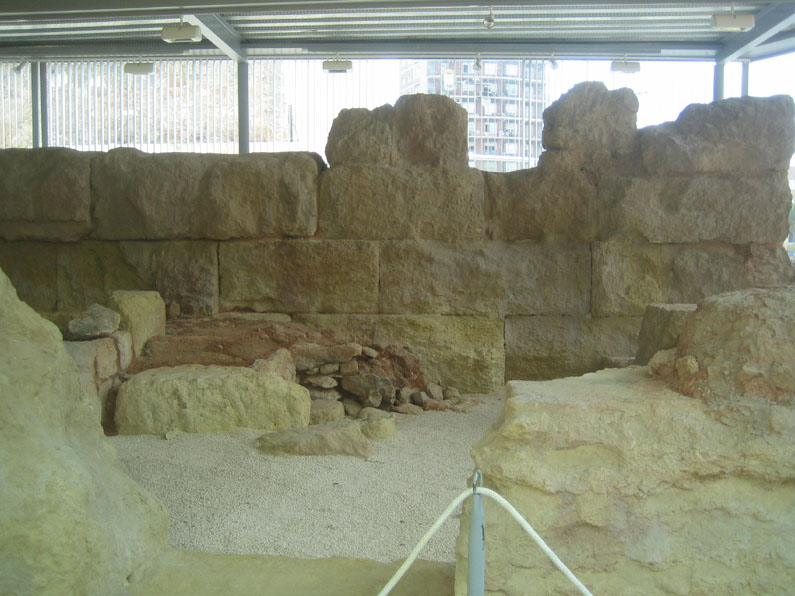
Carthaginian walls of Carthago Nova (3rd century BC)

The town is thought to have originally been named Mastia. Possessing one of the best harbors in the Western Mediterranean, it was re-founded by the Carthaginian general Hasdrubal around 228 BC as Kart-hadasht ("New City"), a name identical to Carthage, for the purpose of serving as a stepping-off point for the conquest of Spain, particularly a silver mine.

The Roman general Scipio Africanus conquered it in 209 BC and renamed it Carthago Nova (literally "New New City") to distinguish it from the mother city. It became a tributary community (civitas stipendaria). Julius Caesar gave the town Latin Rights, and Octavian renamed it in his honor as the colony Colonia Victrix Iulia Nova Carthago or Colonia Vrbs Iulia Nova Carthago (C. V. I. N. C.) depending on the source. The city was very relevant both in the Carthaginian and the Roman conquest of the Iberian Peninsula. In 298 AD, Diocletian constituted a new Roman province in Hispania called Carthaginensis and settled the capital in this city. It remained important until it was sacked by the Vandals in 435 AD.

During the Roman period, it was the site of major silver mines, yielding a daily revenue of 25,000 drachmae. It was known also for the production of garum, a fermented fish sauce, and for esparto grass which granted it a new name, Cartago Spartaria.

Some time during the Roman period a bishopric was founded. A tradition is that it was founded within a couple of decades after the death of Jesus Christ by Saint James.

== Middle Ages ==
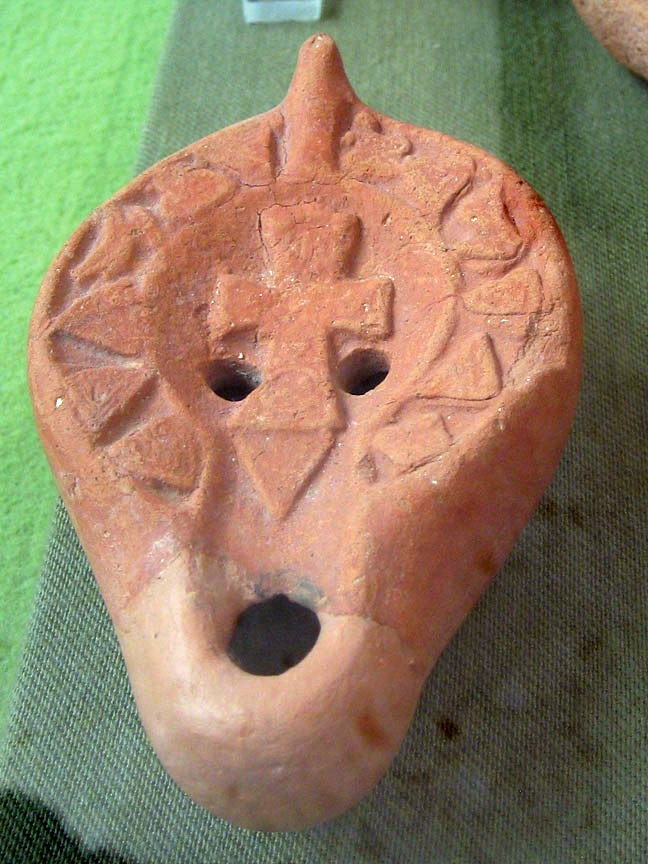
Byzantine lamp (6th century)

The demise and fall of Western Roman sovereignty caused Cartago Spartaria to go into decline. It was occupied successively by the Vandals (409–425), the Visigoths (425–551 and 624–714) and the Eastern Romans (551–624), who made it the capital of Spania (the Byzantine Empire's westernmost province).

Cartagena was re-conquered by the Visigoths, who held it until the Muslim conquest in 714 AD. By that time it was barely a fishing village. It was called Qartayannat-al-Halfa. It was subsequently ruled by the Umayyads (714–756), the Caliphate of Cordova (756–1031), the Taifa of Denia (1031–1076), the Taifa of Saragossa (1076–1081), the Taifa of Tortosa (1081–1092), the Almoravids (1092–1145), the Almohads (1145–1229) and the Taifa of Murcia (1229–1245).

Following the local refusal to abide to the 1243 Treaty of Alcazaz, a Castilian army led by the infante Alfonso of Castile took Cartagena by force in 1245 by means of a military operation combining land forces and a Cantabrian fleet. It was granted a fuero copied after Córdoba's in 1246. Similarly to the other subdued rebel towns, it early underwent an aggressive process of Castilianization. The Bishopric of Cartagena was created. In 1270, Alfonso created the Order of Santa María de España for the naval defense of the Crown of Castile and established its headquarters in Cartagena. In 1296, Cartagena was briefly annexed to the Crown of Aragon, but returned to Castile by the Treaty of Elx in 1305, which fixed the final boundary between the kingdoms of Valencia and Murcia. Cartagena then lost its status as royal demesne and became a seigneurial jurisdiction, a situation which lasted until 1346. Cartagena did not fully recover until the 18th century, when it became a leading naval port in the Mediterranean.

== Modern period ==
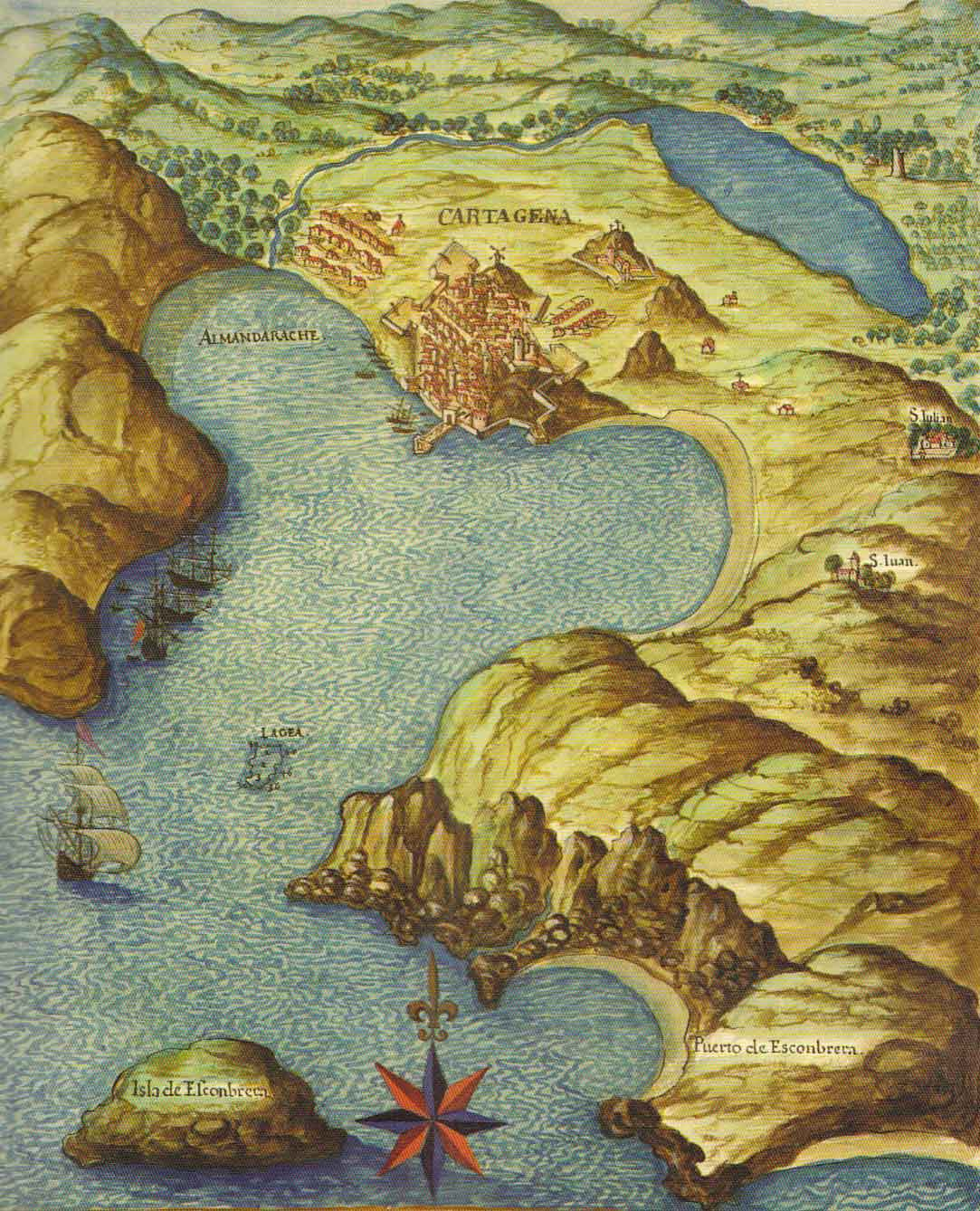
Map by Pedro Teixeira (1634)

As far back as the 16th century Cartagena became one of the most important naval ports in Spain, together with Ferrol in the North.

On 3 September 1643, the Battle of Cartagena took place near the Cabo de Gata between a Spanish fleet and a French fleet.

During the War of the Spanish Succession Cartagena was initially, like the rest of Murcia, firmly controlled by the pro-Bourbon forces under Cardinal Belluga. However after the British capture of Gibraltar there was a successful pro-Hapsburg rising in Cartagena after which the Habsburg claimant was proclaimed King. Despite this the pro-Habsburg Anglo-Dutch forces were defeated first by Cardinal Belluga's forces in the Battle of Murcia and then in the Battle of El Albujón within Cartagena, securing Cartagena for the Bourbons. After the war was over the head of the Marrajo brotherhood was exiled.

In 1728 under the Spanish Bourbons, Cartagena became the capital of the Spanish Navy's Maritime Department of the Mediterranean and the city was heavily fortified with the construction of a modern castle in the place of a former Moorish Kasbah, several barracks and a huge Cartagena Arsenal. In a relatively short period of time, the population of the city grew from around 10,000 to 50,000 inhabitants.

In 1757, during the Seven Years' War, a French naval force was forced to take shelter in the port. A squadron under Duquesne sent to reinforce them was attacked and defeated by a British squadron under Henry Osborn at the Battle of Cartagena.

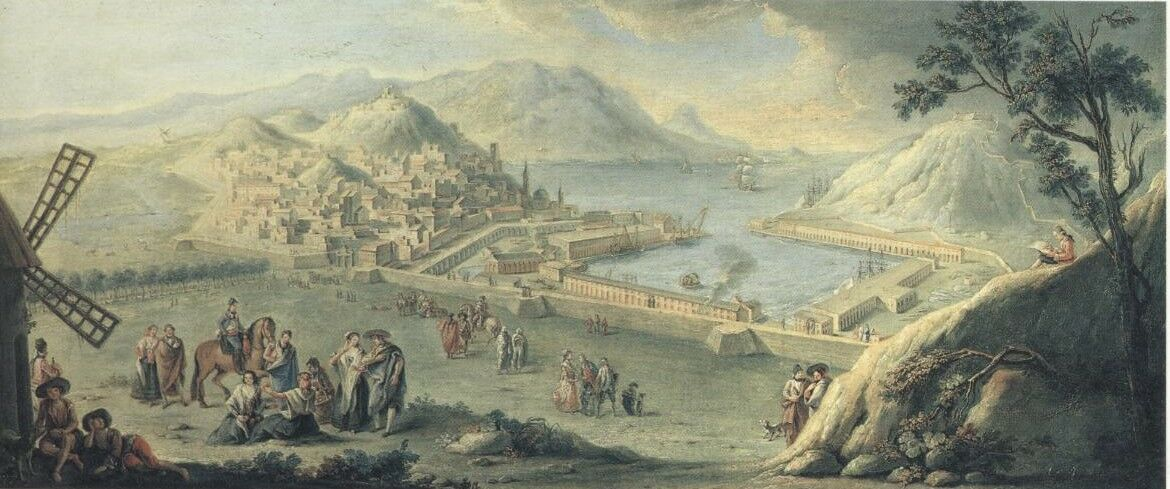
View of Cartagena by Manuel de la Cruz (1786)

== Nineteenth Century ==
In 1873, the city established a self-governing Canton of Cartagena and become the center of the Cantonal Revolution. Governmental forces besieged the city for several months until they surrendered.

== Twentieth Century ==
During the Spanish Civil War (1936–1939), Cartagena was the main base of the Spanish Republican Navy and one of the primary strongholds of the Republican Government. It held out against the forces of General Francisco Franco longer than any other city in Spain, being the last of its cities to surrender. The city saw its industrial activity increase during the 1950s, resulting in greater prosperity and this trend continued until a general decline in manufacturing throughout Europe in the late 1980s and early 1990s.

== Present ==
At the moment, Cartagena comprises part of the autonomous community of the Region of Murcia, and is the seat of the Regional Assembly of Murcia. It is also capital of the maritime province of Cartagena, which was granted by the Royal Decree of 5 October 1607 under the reign of Philip III.
