= Carthago Nova =

Roman name for Cartagena in Spain

- Colonia Vrbs Iulia Nova Carthago
- Qart Hadasht
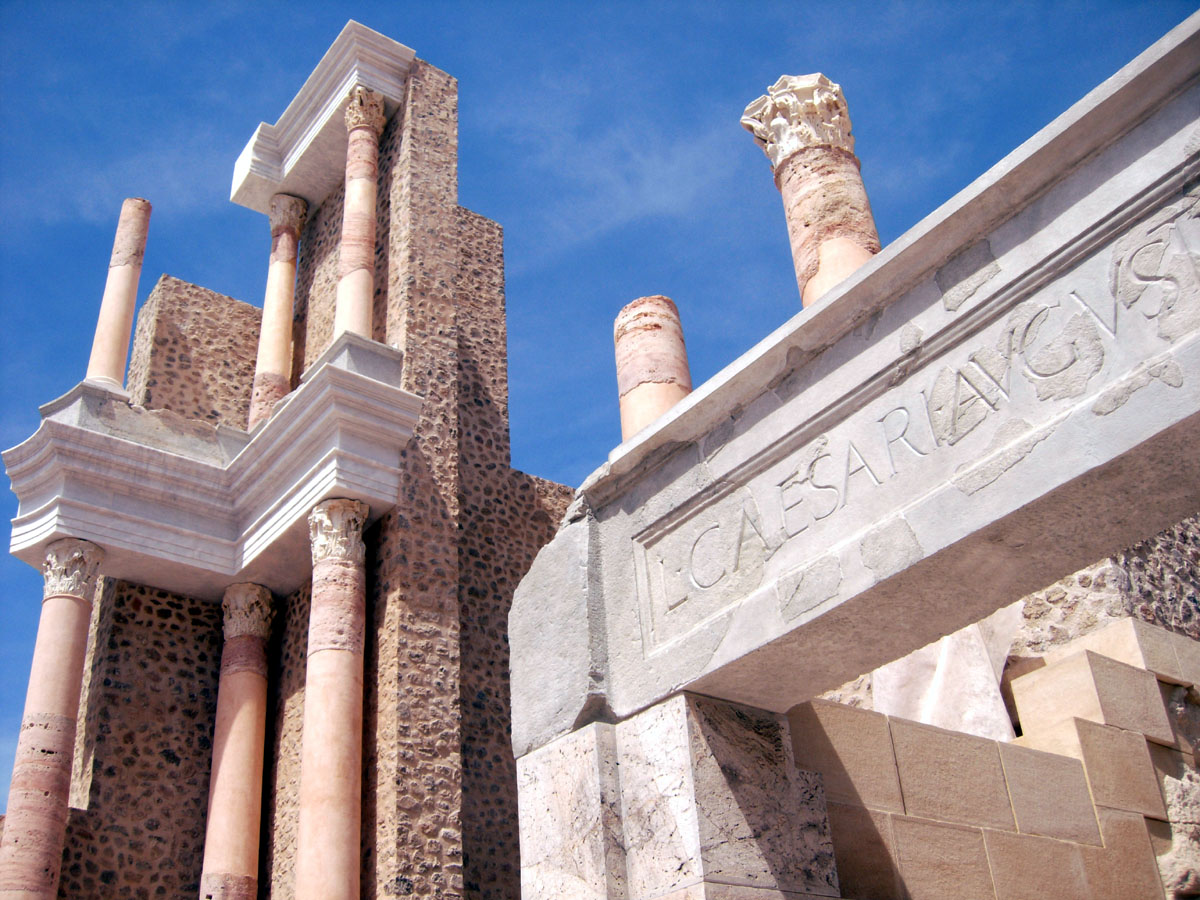
- The Roman theatre, restored by Rafael Moneo
- Interactive map of Carthago Nova
- Periods: Republican / Imperial
- Location: Cartagena, Spain
- Region: Roman Empire

History
- Built: 227 BC
- Built by: Hasdrubal the Fair
- Abandoned: 6th century

Carthago Nova is a historical name for the city of Cartagena in Spain, from the Roman conquest until the Byzantine domination in the 6th century. Its name then changed to Carthago Spartaria. The city may not have been founded entirely ex novo but rather built on earlier Iberian or possibly Tartessian settlement.

== History ==
=== Origin ===
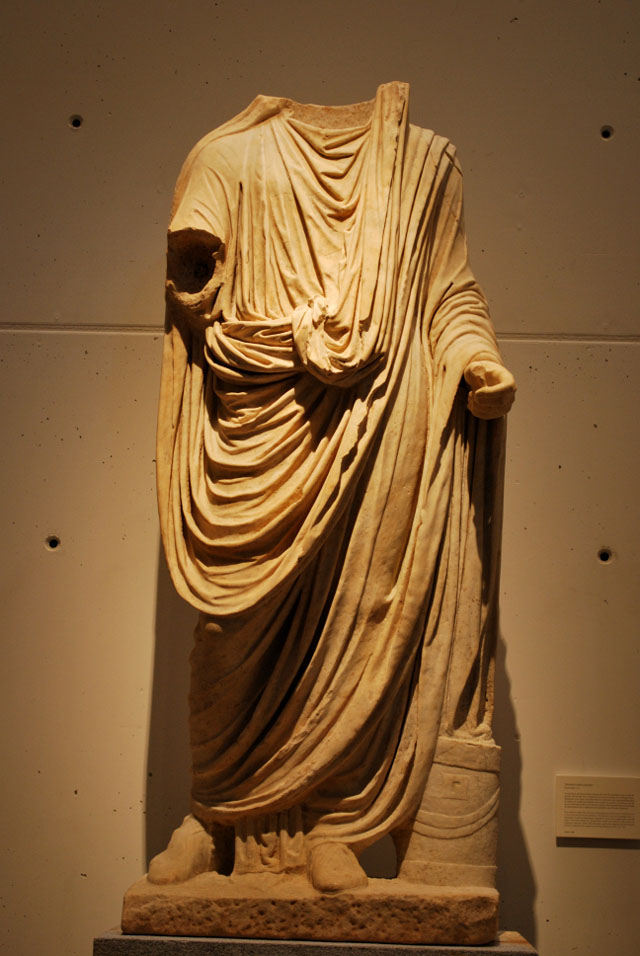
Augustus wearing a toga. Roman Theatre Museum.

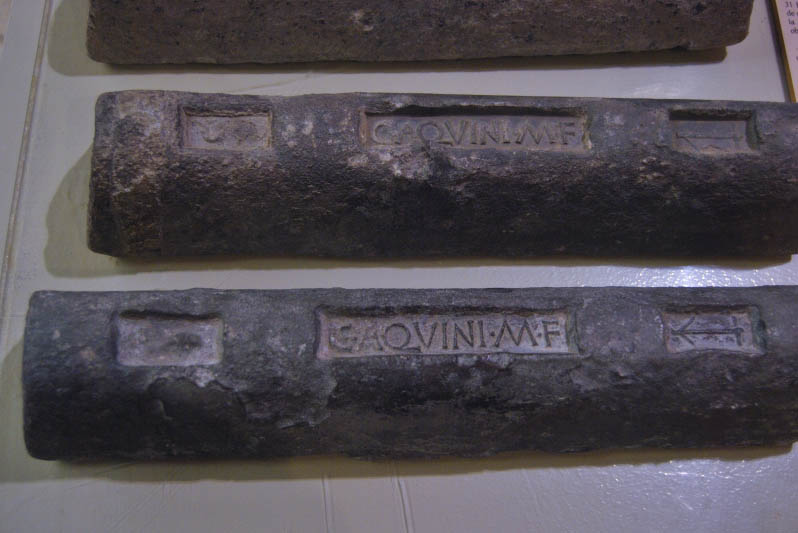
Lead lingots from the mines of Carthago Nova.

Carthago Nova was founded around 227 BC by the Carthaginian general Hasdrubal the Fair, son-in-law and successor of Hamilcar Barca, father of Hannibal. Carthago Nova became the most important of the Carthaginian cities on the peninsula, owing to its strong position and a well-built wall, and it was provided with harbors, lagoons, and silver mines. In Carthago Nova and the surrounding towns, fish abounded that could be salted for export, and it was the principal emporium both for goods arriving by sea destined for inland residents, and for inland products intended for overseas trade.

There is evidence of commercial exchanges with the Phoenicians dating back to the 8th century BC along the entire coastline. In addition, Cartagena has traditionally been associated with the city of Mastia mentioned by the Greco-Latin poet Avienus in the work known as the Ora maritima, which contains the oldest preserved accounts of the Iberian Peninsula, and also cited in the Second Treaty of Rome-Carthage in 348 BC as "Mastia Tarseion" (Mastia of the Tartessians).

All of the present coastline of Cartagena and Mazarrón was highly coveted in Antiquity for its important mineral deposits of lead, silver, zinc, and other minerals. Exploitation and trade in minerals from the Cartagena mines and Mazarrón are documented from Phoenician times.

After the First Punic War, the Carthaginians lost their main stronghold in the Mediterranean: the island of Sicily. The only undefeated Carthaginian general in this conflict with the Romans, Hamilcar Barca, went to the Iberian Peninsula with the intention of forming a personal dominion for the Barcid family—of which he was the head—somewhat apart from the direct control of the Senate of Carthage, making Carthago Nova the center of his military operations and enabling him to control the mineral wealth of the southeast of the peninsula. Following Hamilcar’s death in a clash with local tribes, his son Hannibal assumed his position, intending to raise an army powerful enough to face the Romans. Thus, Qart Hadasht became the main city of the Carthaginians in Hispania. From there, Hannibal departed with his elephants on his famous expedition to Italy; he crossed the Alps at the start of the Second Punic War in 218 BC.

=== Conquest by Rome and Republican period ===
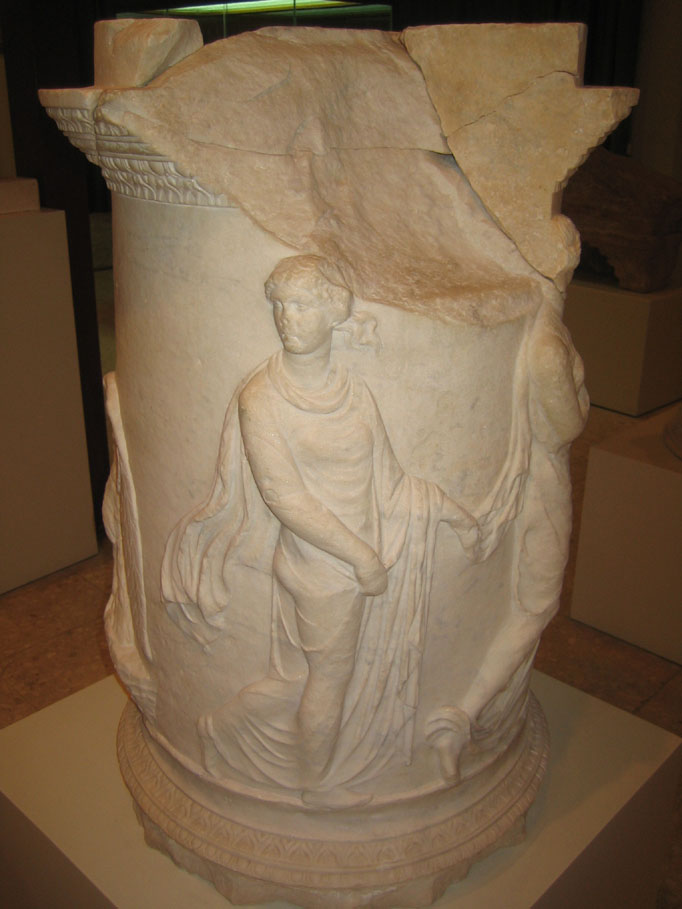
Altar of Jupiter discovered in the Roman theatre. Roman Theatre Museum.

Undoubtedly, the first Roman interest in Hispania was extracting profit from its legendary mineral wealth, especially the mining deposits of the Cartagena and Mazarrón region, then under Carthaginian control.

The Roman general Scipio Africanus took Qart Hadasht in 209 BC, renaming it Carthago Nova as a civitas stipendaria (tributary community). Later, it received Latin rights under Julius Caesar and became a Roman colony in 44 BC. The settlement developed into one of the most important Roman cities of Hispania. Administratively, it belonged to the Roman province of Hispania Citerior.

=== High Empire ===
The Roman prosperity of Carthago Nova was primarily based on the exploitation of the silver and lead mines of the Cartagena mining area. Around 40,000 enslaved people are said to have worked in these mines, which had been exploited since Phoenician times, with Rome continuing extensive extraction.

In 44 BC, the city was granted the title of a Roman colony under the name Colonia Vrbs Iulia Nova Carthago (C.V.I.N.C), made up of citizens with full Roman rights.

In 27 BC, Augustus reorganized Hispania, and the city was included in the new imperial province of Hispania Tarraconensis.

From the Republican era, there was a Roman amphitheatre in the city. However, it was under Augustus that Carthago Nova underwent an ambitious urban and monumental development program, which included the construction of an impressive Roman theatre and a large forum.

Between the reigns of Tiberius and Claudius, Hispania Tarraconensis was divided into seven juridical convents, one of which was the Conventus Iuridicus Carthaginensis, with its capital in Carthago Nova.

Beginning in the 2nd century, like other cities of Hispania, the city experienced a slow economic and demographic decline. The entire eastern sector of the city was abandoned, including the forum built in the time of Augustus. The city contracted into the area spanning from the Concepción hill to El Molinete. One reason for the decline appears to have been depletion of the local mines.

=== Late Empire: Creation of the Carthaginensis province ===
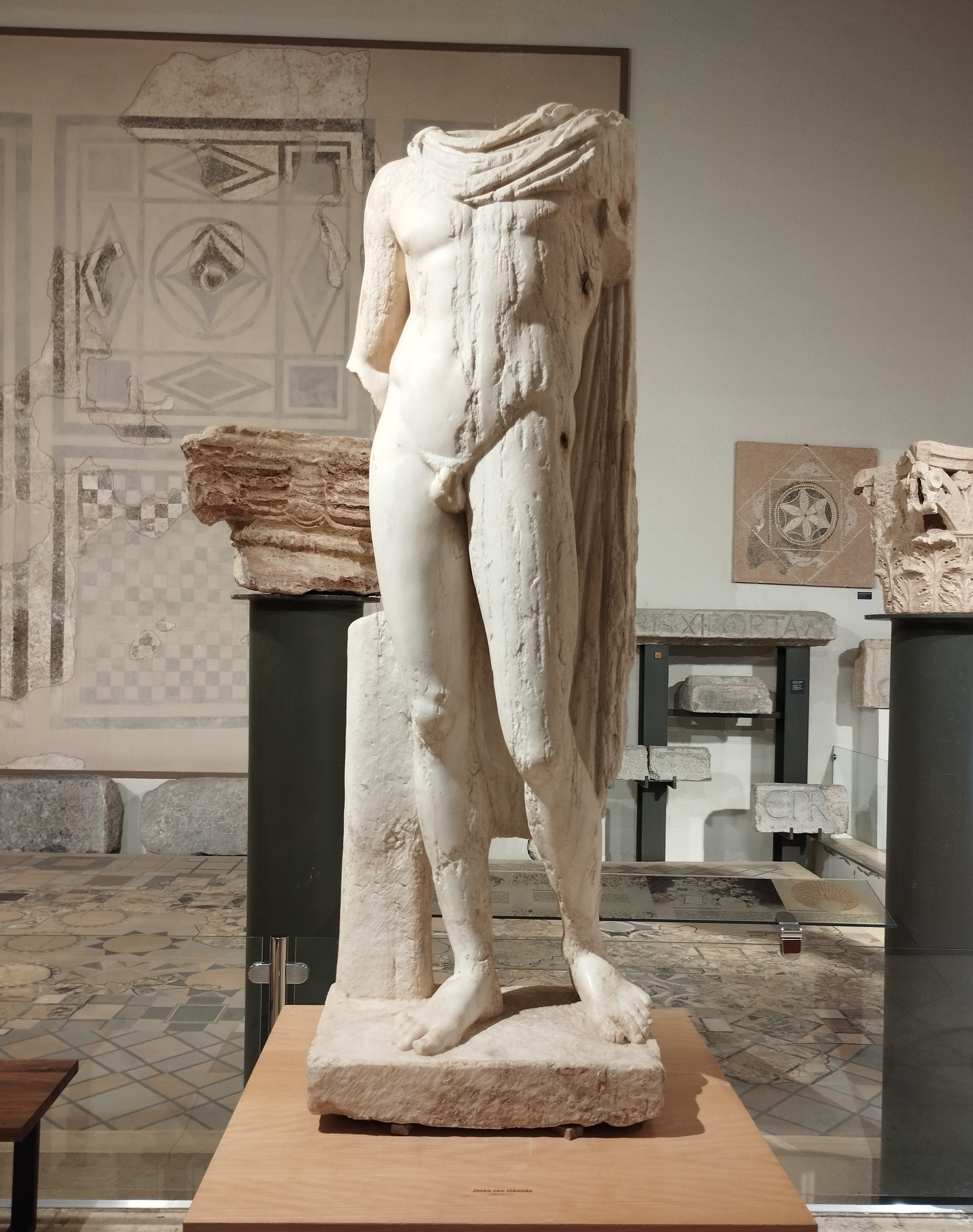
A youth with a chlamys from the Roman forum. Archaeological Museum of Cartagena

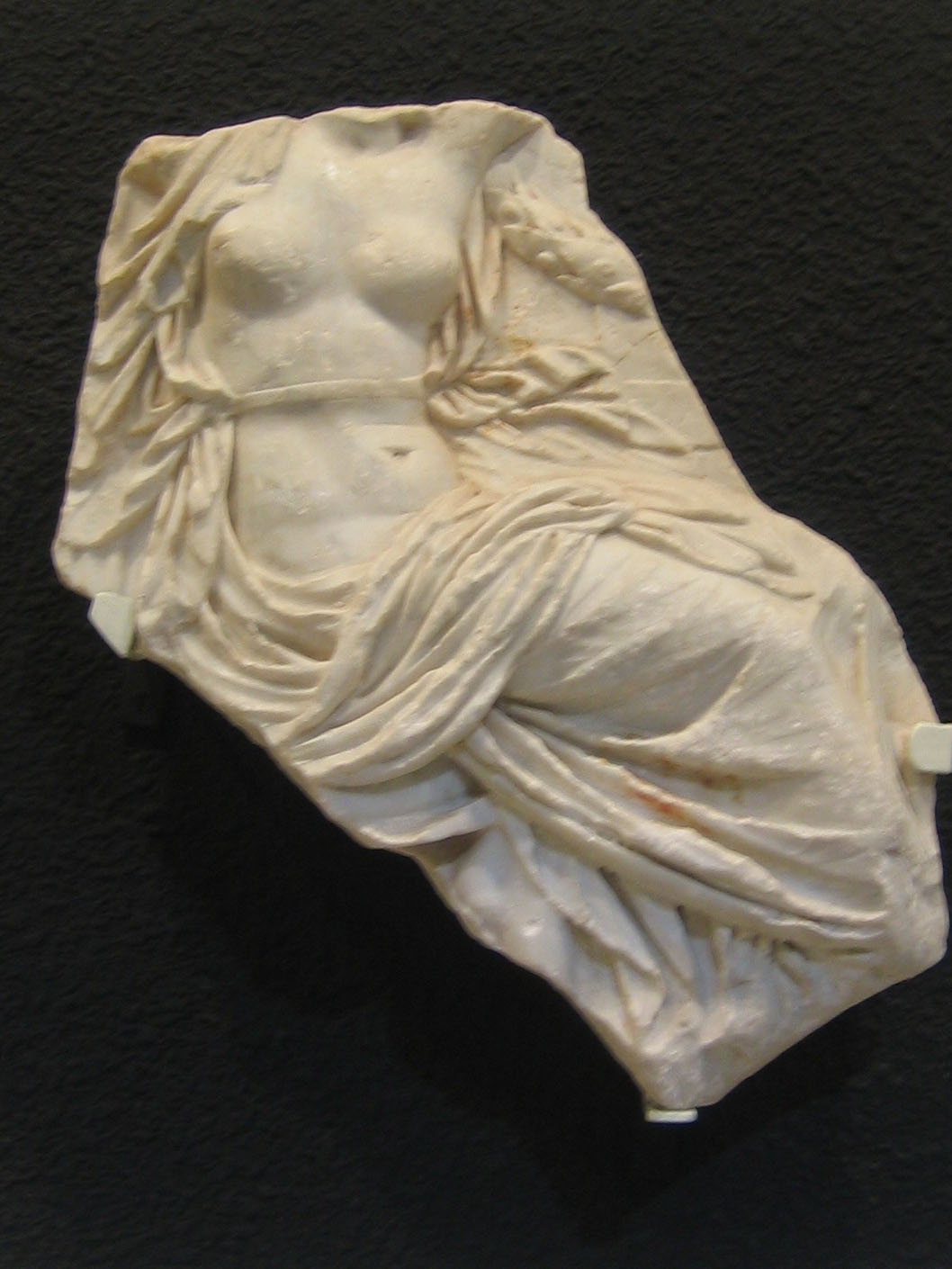
Rhea Silvia. Roman Theatre Museum

This downturn was slowed in 298, when Emperor Diocletian divided Hispania Tarraconensis into three provinces, creating the Roman province of Carthaginensis, with its capital in Cartagena.

A large part of the eastern sector of the city was rebuilt using materials from the Augustan buildings, as was the case with the monumental market built over the remains of the Roman theatre, or the baths on Calle Honda.

Commercial activity in the city shifted to the production of garum, a fermented fish sauce; numerous remains of such facilities have been found along the coast. An example of the shift from mining to garum production can be seen in the Roman villa of Paturro.

Around 425, the city was devastated and plundered by the Vandals before they moved on to North Africa.

Nevertheless, the city must have recovered to some extent. In 461, Emperor Majorian assembled a fleet of 45 ships in Cartagena, aiming to invade and recover the Vandal Kingdom of North Africa for the Empire. The Battle of Cartagena ended in a serious defeat for the Roman navy, which was completely destroyed.

=== Late Antiquity ===
After being sacked by the Vandals around 439, and following the collapse of the Western Roman Empire in 476, the city fell under Visigothic control, although it retained a strongly Romanized population. In the midst of Visigothic internal conflicts in the mid-6th century, one faction appealed for help to the Byzantine Emperor Justinian I. After a brief campaign, he seized a significant strip of southern Spain and established the city as the capital of the province of Spania, renaming it Carthago Spartaria. The Bishop of Cartagena then became the metropolitan bishop of this Byzantine province.

== Archaeology ==
=== Archaeological sites ===
- Amphitheatre of Cartagena (Roman amphitheatre). Dating to the Republican era, it stands beneath the current bullring. Only a small portion of its structures are visible. Excavation and museum work began in 2009.
- Augusteum and forum. A Roman building that served as the seat of the priests dedicated to the imperial cult, 1st century AD.
- Roman quarries of Cartagena.
- Casa de la Fortuna (House of Fortune). A 1st-century BC Roman home. It features noteworthy mural paintings and mosaics.
- Barrio y museo del foro romano de Cartagena (The Roman Forum Quarter and Museum). A group of Roman buildings discovered in 1968, including a stretch of paved road (the city’s decumanus maximus), part of some late imperial baths, a college building, and a sanctuary dedicated to the goddess Isis. A new museum devoted to the Roman forum of Carthago Nova was scheduled to open in 2020.
- Roman theatre. Discovered in October 1988, it is one of the largest in Roman Hispania.
- Torre Ciega. A Roman funerary monument from the 1st century AD, called "Blind Tower" because it lacks windows.
- Villa romana del Paturro (Roman villa of El Paturro). Situated near Portmán.

=== Museums ===
Most archaeological remains connected with Carthago Nova can be found in the following museums:

- Municipal Archaeological Museum of Cartagena.
- National Museum of Underwater Archaeology.
- Roman Theatre Museum. Opened in 2008.
- Museum of the Roman Forum Molinete. Opened in 2021.
- Archaeological Museum of La Unión (in the town of Portmán).

== See also ==
- History of Cartagena, Spain
- Mastia
