= Ancient diocese of Cartagena =

The Ancient diocese of Cartagena existed before the Muslim conquest of Spain.

== Preaching of James the Great ==
There is a tradition that the diocese of was established very early, around the first century. A tradition from the 17th century traces the origins of Christian worship in Cartagena to the preaching in Spain of the apostle Saint James, who is said to have disembarked in the city to begin his mission in Roman Hispania. This foundational myth emerged after the publication in 1670 of the work Mística Ciudad de Dios by Mary of Jesus of Ágreda, where the nun revealed a dream affirming that:

"From Jaffa, James went to Sardinia, and without stopping on that island, he soon reached Spain and disembarked at the port of Cartagena, where he began his preaching in these kingdoms."

== Early Church ==
The presence of Christian communities in the province of Carthaginensis in Hispania can be documented from the early 4th century. The acts of the Council of Elvira, held between 300 and 313 during the persecution of Diocletian, record the presence of a bishop from Eliocroca (now Lorca) and a presbyter named Eutiches, from the episcopal see of Carthaginensis, proving the existence of at least two bishoprics in the area.

In 325, Cartagena was elevated to the status of a Metropolitan Archdiocese, gaining the suffragan see of Palencia in 400. The first documented bishop of Cartagena was Héctor, who attended the Council of Tarragona in 516. In 546, a council of the seven bishops of the Carthaginensis province was held in Valencia, without mentioning their sees. At that time, Cartagena, as the provincial capital, was likely the metropolitan see and Celsino, the first bishop mentioned in the record, was the metropolitan bishop of Cartagena.

No trace of the old cathedral has yet been found.

== Byzantines and Visigoths ==
In 552 Byzantine troops established the province of Spania with its capital at Cartagena wresting it from Visigothic control. Although, Saint Isidore and his letters reference Liciniano de Cartagena as the metropolitan of the Byzantine territories on the Iberian Peninsula, the primary status for the Visigothic territories went to Toledo and the earlier Visigothic Councils of Toledo did not record the presence of any bishop from Cartagena.

In 623, Byzantine controlled Cartagena was destroyed by the Visigothic king Suintila. The bishop of Cartagena fled to Begastri, a fortified Roman-origin city near the current town of Cehegín, after the Visigothic king Suintila (c. 588 – 633/635) destroyed that city. The first mention of a bishop of the Diocese of Begastri appears from that time in a decree issued by the Visigothic king Gundemar.

The fate of the episcopal see of Cartagena remains uncertain, although it is recorded by some that the archdiocese was at that time renamed the Metropolitan Archdiocese of Cartagena–Bigastro. Many authors, including the Enrique Flórez in his work España Sagrada, believe that the see was moved to Begastri, as from the Fourth Council of Toledo in 633 onwards, the presence of bishops from Bigastri rather than Cartegena is consistently recorded in all the councils of the Hispanic church held in Toledo. Excavations at Begastri have uncovered the remains of a primitive basilica dedicated to Saint Vincent, which may have been the episcopal seat. It remained a bishopric until Bigastro in its turn was destroyed by Arabs at the end of the 7th century. No longer a residential diocese, Bigastro is today listed by the Catholic Church as a titular see.

However, in the Eleventh Council of Toledo held in 675, an assistant named Egila, a deacon of Bishop Múnulo of Cartagena, is mentioned. After the expulsion of the Byzantines and the complete Visigothic conquest of the Iberian Peninsula, the Twelfth Council of Toledo in 681 established the primacy of the Diocese of Toledo, eliminating Cartagena’s historic metropolitan status.

== Islamic Spain and Suppression ==
In 988, some time after the Muslim invasion of Spain, the existence of a bishop of Córdoba named Juan, who had previously held the title of bishop of Cartagena, is noted in the work España Sagrada. He is noted as the donor of a Bible found in the archives of the Toledo Cathedral. This is seen as evidence of the existence of Mozarabic communities in the city and the continued presence of the episcopal see. However the diocese was believed to have been suppressed, around the year 1000.

== New Diocese ==
In 1243 Alfonso X of Castile launched a campaign to reconquer the Kingdom of Murcia, and petitioned Pope Innocent IV to restore the Diocese of Cartagena. In 1250 the Pope issued the bull "Spiritus exultante" restoring the diocese. The first bishop of the new phase of the Diocese was the Franciscan friar Pedro Gallego, Alfonso's confessor.

Although the city had lost some of its importance during Muslim rule, the memory of the ancient Diocese of Carthaginensis, based on the former province created by Diocletian, remained. The restoration of the episcopal seat was aligned with the aspirations of Alfonso X to restore the old Roman order as part of his imperial policy and his ambition to be crowned Emperor of the Holy Roman Empire. The episcopal seat was thus restored.
