= Roman Theatre (Cartagena) =

Ancient Roman theater in Cartagena, Spain

Roman Theatre of Cartagena
- Teatro Romano de Cartagena (Spanish)
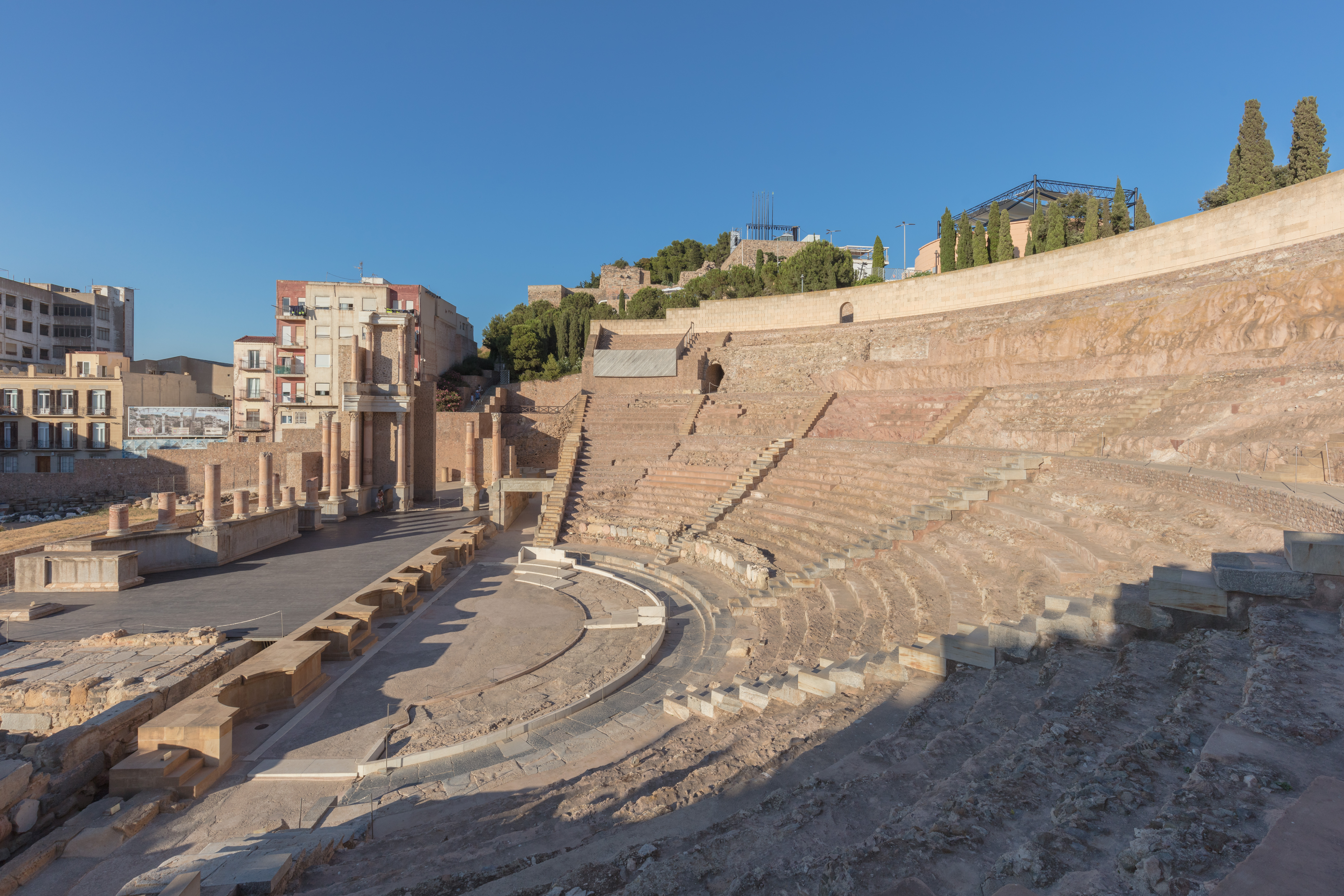

- Location within Spain
- 37.5995°N 0.9841°W
- Type: Archaeological site, monument, Roman theatre
- Cultures: Roman Empire
- Location: Cartagena, Spain
- Region: Murcia

History
- Built: 5–1 BCE
- Built by: Gaius Caesar
- Abandoned: 425 CE

Site notes
- Excavation dates: 1988–2003
- Condition: Restored
- Public access: Yes

The Roman Theatre of Cartagena is a Roman theatre in the Roman colonia of Carthago Nova—present-day Cartagena, Spain. Built between the years 5 and 1 BCE, it had a capacity of some 6,000 spectators and was used for Roman theatrical performances.

== Territorial Framework ==
The Roman Theater of Cartagena is located in a coastal city near the sea in the Region of Murcia, in southeastern Spain. Cartagena has a dry Mediterranean climate with generally high temperatures (between 20 and 37 °C in summer), low rainfall, high humidity and moderate wind. Being very close to the sea, it is exposed to salt and sea breezes, which contributes to its deterioration.

Nevertheless, the romans thought about the selection of this urban area near the port; on the one hand the building was far from the unhealthy area of the lagoon, located at the other end of the city, on the other hand it took advantage of the morphography of the land, locating it in the slope of the hill, built into the natural terrain, to fit the stands facing north and protected from the prevailing easterly winds. Its astronomical orientation was also taken into account, so that the axial axis of the building is directed to the sunrise at the winter solstice.

The space in which the Theater is located is a densely built historic center that has never stopped being inhabited at any stage of history, which has favoured the Theater to remain buried for so long. Over time it had become one of the most depressed and abandoned areas of the old town, so that the comprehensive recovery of the Roman building has transcended a simple archaeological investigation and has become the engine of regeneration of a large sector of the city. Today, it is a densely populated and very busy area, which makes the archaeological remains integrated with modern buildings. This is also reflected in other environmental factors that affect it such as the urban pollution thanks to the nearby traffic and the vibration risks of the area.

Moreover, its location next to some of the most emblematic buildings of the city, such as the Cathedral, the Town Hall, the medieval castle and the port facilities, makes it one of the most attractive and monumental places in the city. Being a place of historical and touristic interest, it has a great tourist pressure (over 200,000 visitors per year), which generates wear and erosion risk.

== Historical Framework ==
It all begins in Roman times, when Cartagena, by then Carthago Nova, belonged to the Roman Empire. In Cartagena, under the rule of Augustus (31 B.C.-14 A.D.), taking advantage of the slope of the hill of La Concepción and in a position close to the port, the Theater was built so that from the sea the magnificent building could be seen, which underlined the importance of the city. The Theater, inaugurated in 1 B.C., functioned as such for two centuries, although partial restorations were necessary during that time.

Prior to the theatre, in the area where it is currently located, there was a Roman house built at the end of the second century B.C., which was intentionally demolished for the construction of the Roman Theater in the time of Augustus.

After a fire that caused a large part of its architectural framework to disappear, in the 5th century A.D. what was left standing of the Theater was dismantled and its architectural elements were used to build a market. Later on, over its ruin a commercial district was built in Byzantine times (6th-7th centuries).

Later, after the Christian conquest, the church (actual cathedral) of Santa María la Vieja was built. At the beginning of the 20th century it was a densely populated neighbourhood until the richer population moved out in the sixties-seventies, leaving the area deteriorated and almost abandoned.

In an attempt to stop this process of degradation and revitalize the area, the local and regional administrations planned the construction of a Regional Crafts Center on the site of the former Casa de la Condesa de Peralta. The beginning of the works began in 1988, motivated by the new construction, with the first excavation campaign that provided a complex superposition of structures and rich architectural elements that already hinted at the importance of those constructions. It finally took shape in the 1990 campaign, when it was possible to identify the still very partial remains of the Roman Theatre of Carthago Nova.

In the period between 1996 and 2003, the almost total excavation of the entire Theatre was completed, allowing it to be viewed in all its grandeur and splendor, re-emerging as an emblem of Cartagena.

In 2003, the Roman Theater Foundation was created with the purpose of promoting the integral project for the recovery of the monument. The project was assigned to Rafael Moneo, who planned the integration of the remains into the urban fabric, as well as their proper conservation and exhibition for educational and cultural purposes.

== Legal Framework ==
The archaeological excavations, financed within the framework of the collaboration agreement between the City of Cartagena, the Autonomous Community of the Region of Murcia and the Cajamurcia Foundation, were directed by Sebastián Ramallo Asensio and Elena Ruiz Valderas, who, together with an important team of professionals, made it possible to know and understand the exceptional architecture, decoration and meaning of the Roman monument. The purpose of the signing of this agreement was to recover the Roman Theater and create a Museum to house its collection. At the same time, the process to declare it an Asset of Cultural Interest (Bien de Interés Cultural, BIC) was initiated.

During the excavations, other institutions and companies also intervened to develop different studies: the area of Archaeology of the University of Murcia, was in charge of some of the excavation works; studies on the penetrability of the consolidant were developed by the Instituto de la Construcción, S.A (I.T.C); and the laboratory Arte-Lab, S.L. carried out the analysis of the different mortars of the cavea.

After the excavations were finished, the integral project was commissioned to the architect Rafael Moneo, with whom a process of study and discussion began, together with the archaeology and restoration team. The progress of these works was boosted again with the creation of the Foundation of the Roman Theater of Cartagena in 2003. With the Autonomous Community of Murcia, the City Council of Cartagena and the Cajamurcia Foundation as founding partners, the foundation was created in response to the need to implement a comprehensive project for the recovery of the Roman Theater that required an organizational and management structure capable of developing the entire intervention. This management model allowed the execution of the different projects at a good pace and without interruptions until the inauguration of the Museum and Roman Theater in 2008, a project that without the interest and effort of these institutions could not have been completed.

Currently, the Roman Theater of Cartagena is listed as an Asset of Cultural Interest (Bien de Interés Cultural, BIC) of Spain, and is protected under different laws such as Law 16/1985 of Spanish Historical Heritage at the state level, as well as under Regional protection under the Autonomous Community of Murcia. It also has urban planning protections such as the PGOU Cartagena which prohibits nearby heavy development. This is why, throughout its recent history, the Theater has faced different constraints such as excavation and construction restrictions, as well as visual integration and conservation requirements for the new project.

== Restoration project ==
After more than 10 years of excavation projects to bring the 1st century BC Roman Theater to light, the restoration project was awarded to the architect Rafael Moneo in 2003. This whole process was key to determine the criteria and objectives that were to prevail in the restoration of the site, seeking to protect the historical and documentary value of the work without sacrificing it for the benefit of an aesthetic priority. To this end, Moneo worked with archaeologists Sebastián Ramallo and Elena Ruiz and the restoration specialist Isabel García-Galán in consolidating the theatre's ruins.

Following the archaeological recovery of the Roman Theatre, a process of analysis and discussion was begun in order to define the guidelines for work on the monument itself. After this time of reflection, it was decided that the main purpose of the restored theatre would be to serve as a monument open to visitors, brought back to life to be contemplated and enjoyed by society, and as an exponent of the identifying traits of Roman Cartagena. The richness of the pieces found in the excavation, including Corinthian capitals of Carrara marble carved in Rome, red travertine column shafts, altars, and commemorative plaques, raised the opportunity to include a Roman Theatre Museum in the intervention.

Moneo's project incorporates and links constructed and empty buildings by means of a museum route that bridges the notable difference in elevation between the port and the theatre. The museum is conceived as an itinerary that goes from the sea to the higher levels, culminating in the unexpected appearance of the imposing space where the Roman Theater stands. In Moneo's own words, "The museum has been designed as a 'promenade' from sea level to the higher ground of the city, climaxing with the unexpected appearance of the theatre's imposing space". This promenade runs through exhibition spaces illuminated by a complex system of skylights, where a series of mechanical elevators and stairs have been installed, serving as a framework the pieces found during the excavations.

The project plan shows the architect's desire to "make a city", not only attentive to the interior spaces of the Museum but also to the public spaces of a city with a long urban history such as Cartagena. He tries to integrate the project with different historical buildings in the area, with a particular emphasis on the unique partial superimposition of the so-called Old Cathedral (Santa María la Vieja) on part of the Theater's grandstand, as well as parts of the Roman house prior to the Theater, which are still preserved inside the museum.

As for the restoration project of the Theater itself, priority has been given to protecting its historical value, so the objectives of the project focus on: reducing as much as possible the processes of alteration caused by various factors to ensure its conservation; the consolidation of the different structural elements of the Theater; and the recovery of part of the original image of the monument at those points where the loss of the original volume had occurred and whose reintegration would allow a better interpretation of the monument.

The development of the intervention project in the Theater was aimed at offering a clearer understanding of the monument to visitors, therefore it was necessary to reconstruct the remains of the stands that had completely disappeared without changing the original appearance, whilst simultaneously reinforcing the original conservation work. That way the entrances have been replaced for visits and tours of the inside of the building and the stage façade has been partially restored along with its original elements.

The reversibility of the intervention also plays a fundamental role, since the necessary measures have been taken to ensure that the new work can be perfectly dismantled without any damage to the original one. Among the main goals of the restoration intervention was the aim to preserve the original stone material, testing consolidants that are physicochemically and aesthetically compatible while maintaining the structural integrity and visual unity of the monument.

The intervention began with a first stage with the intention to experiment with the materials as well as the methodologies, techniques, processes, finishes, reintegrations and reconstructions in order to empirically verify which of them were the most suitable for a global intervention of the monument.

For this purpose, and aiming to have a minimum intervention, it was chosen an area that brought together most of the problems that would be encountered in the following phases: the first cuneus of the ima cavea. It had a significant volumetric loss small gaps, original mortars and areas with the rock of the steps in the air.

For the construction of the Theater various local stone materials were used, such as red travertino of Mula, gray limestone from the Mar Menor, marble from Cabezo Gordo in Torre Pacheco and yellow sandstone known as Tabaire from a quarry near the city. The Tabaire sandstone, the principal material of the construction, is a rock of high porosity and scarce hardness, characteristics that facilitate its extraction and work but that at the same time make it especially fragile and deteriorable.

There are many the macroscopic causes that affect the Tabaire sandstone. First of all its own vulnerability of the material, which makes it extremely vulnerable to atmospheric agents such as rain, humidity, salts, and pollutants. The continuous exposure to wind, humidity and sea breezes and salt, as well as the continuous use and the weight of the history of the building itself until its final abandonment, have contributed to the deterioration of the Theater over the centuries.

A more exhaustive study of the materials has made it possible to determine the specific degradations and pathologies of the study subject. Among the most prominent are alveolization, blistering and detachment of surface layers, scaling or flaking of stone surfaces, chromatic alterations due to biological alteration, and surface erosion with the loss of definition in carved features along the building.

One section of the stage, where stones from the Theater had been reused for a 5th-century market, was left as it was found, while a missing section of the cavea was rebuilt in rubblework, and the highly eroded surviving areas are basically untouched reinforcing the thought of minimum intervention. The project also focuses on distinguishability, having modern treatments applied without altering the form or structure, especially with ethyl silicate. The compatibility was also determinant in the project so nanolime which is chemically compatible with Tabaire sandstone, forming CaCO_{3} upon carbonation and mirroring the stone's original composition was used. These two treatments employed can be considered as reversible as they do not permanently alter or cover the original substrate.

With this in mind, any new work has been separated from the original work by means of strips of geo-textile fibre allowing sufficient separation for the new work to be removed if necessary, reinforcing the reversibility of the intervention. In order to reduce the material impact, authentic materials have been used, and contemporary Roman techniques have been employed wherever possible in the construction of the building: lime mortar, made with washed sand from the river and containing andesites, lime-stones and phyllites from extra-milled rock have been used. Furthermore, only locally quarried stones, as would have been used in antiquity, have been included.

In short, one could say that the project for the restoration of the Roman Theater of Cartagena carried out by Rafael Moneo as part of the new Theater Museum project, stands as a landmark project in the field of architectural conservation in Spain. It aims to incorporate the recovered Roman Theater into the city ensuring that the integrity of the original structure was preserved while enhancing its long-term stability. Currently, the Roman Theater Museum of Cartagena and its Foundation are facing a new action plan whose challenge is to lay the foundations for the future excavation of the post scaenam portico and its enhancement.

== Gallery ==
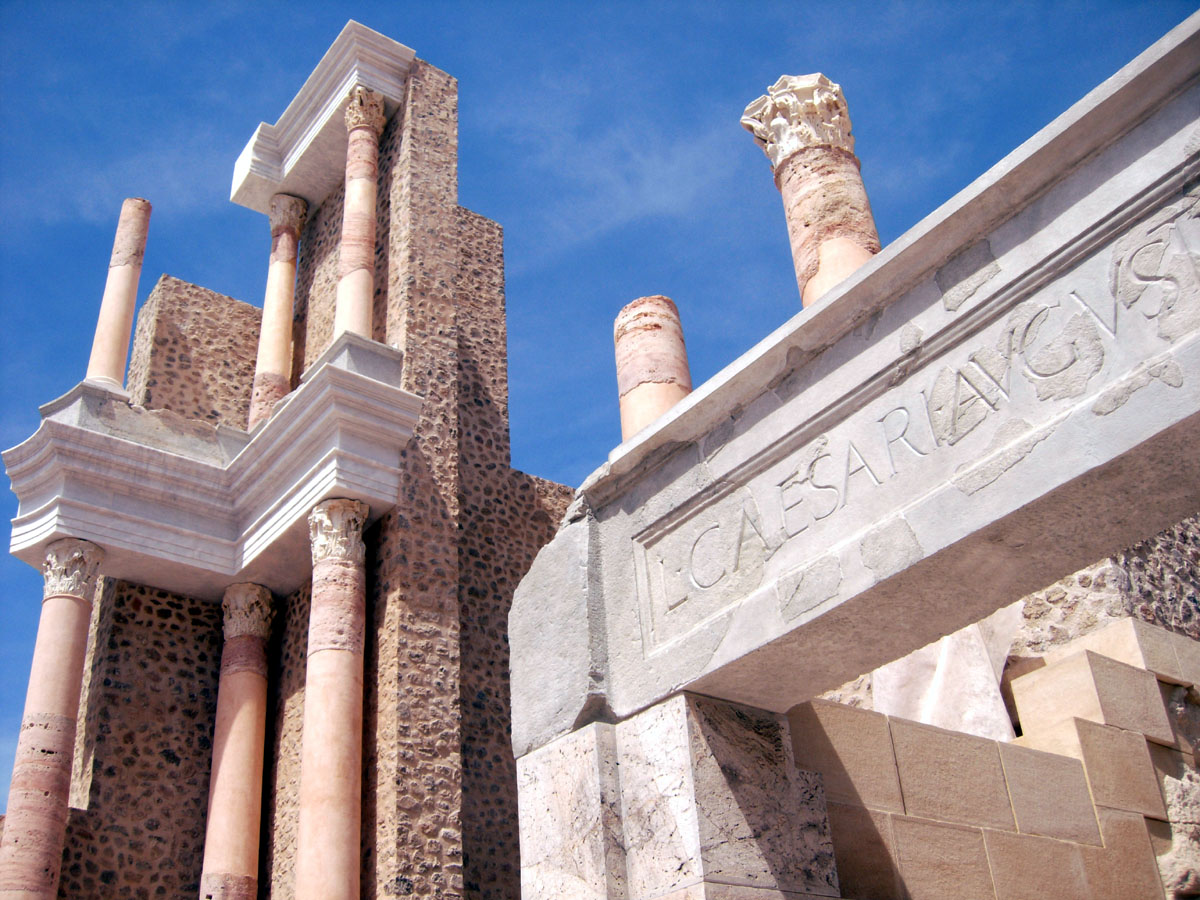
Roman theater of Cartagena dating from the 1st century B.C.E. Detail of the scene (scaenae frons) with the inscription of the dedication to Lucius Caesar on the side passage, after restoration.

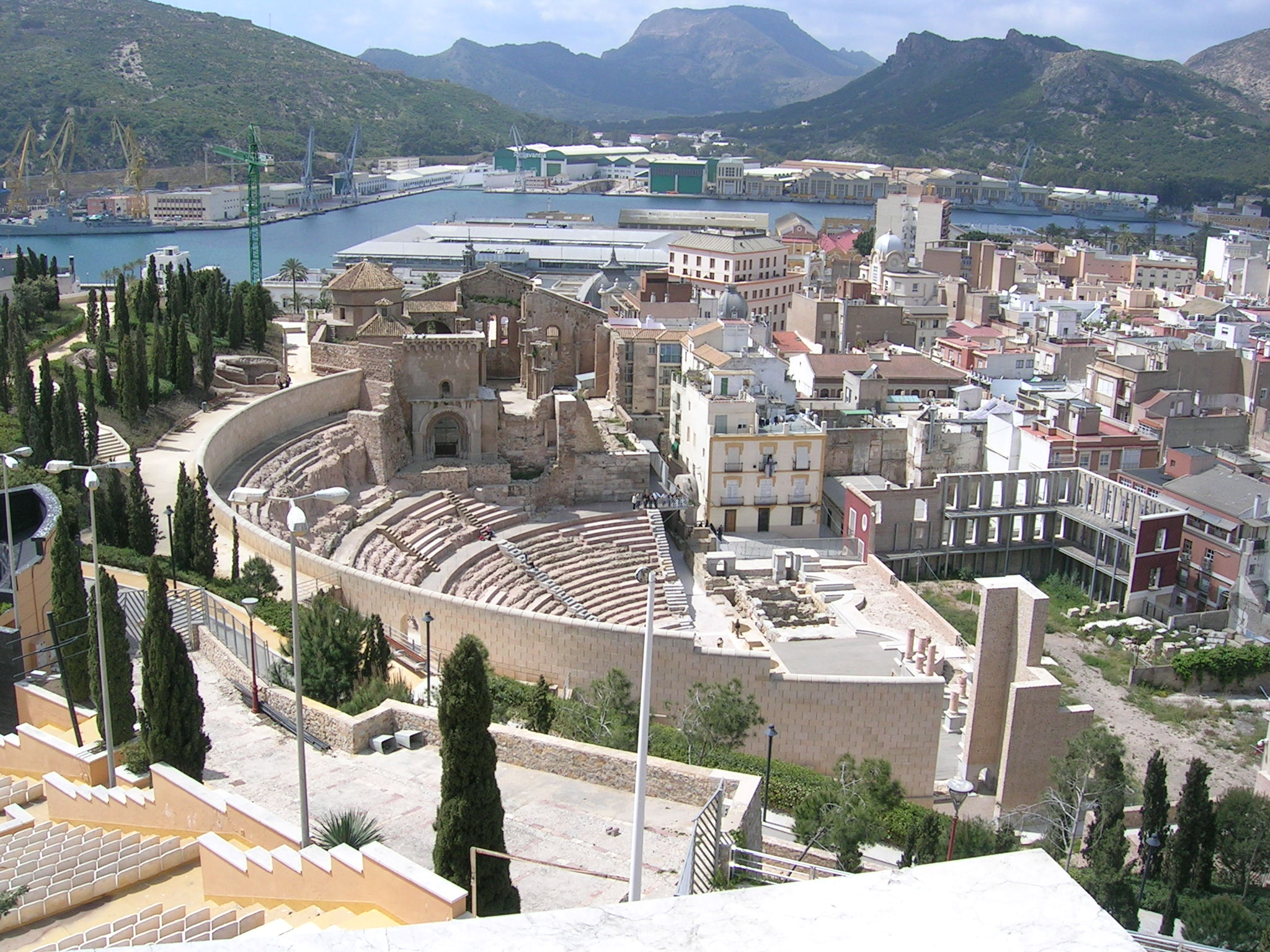
View of the Roman theater of Cartagena & the ruins of the Cathedral

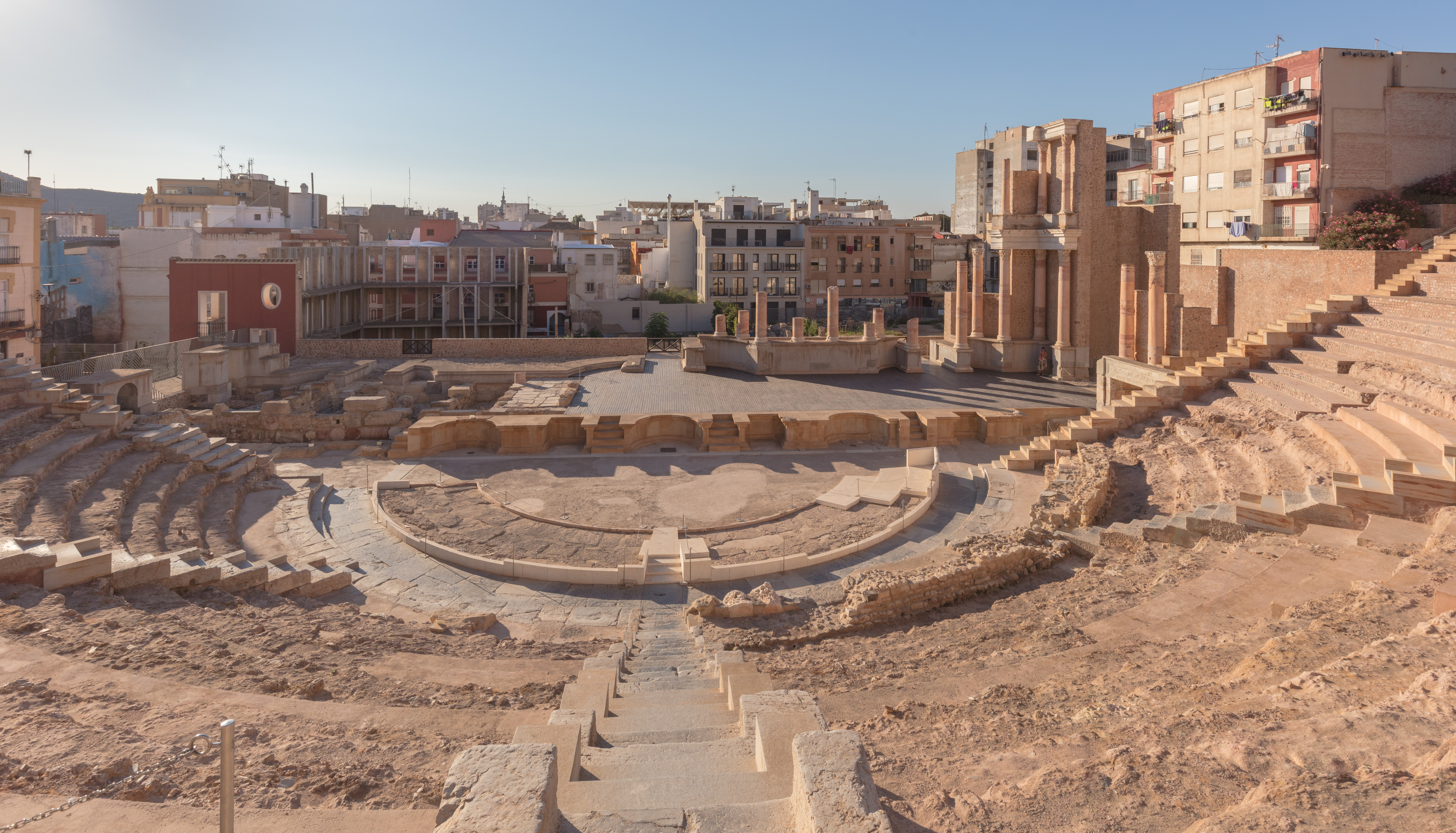
View of the Roman Theatre (back)

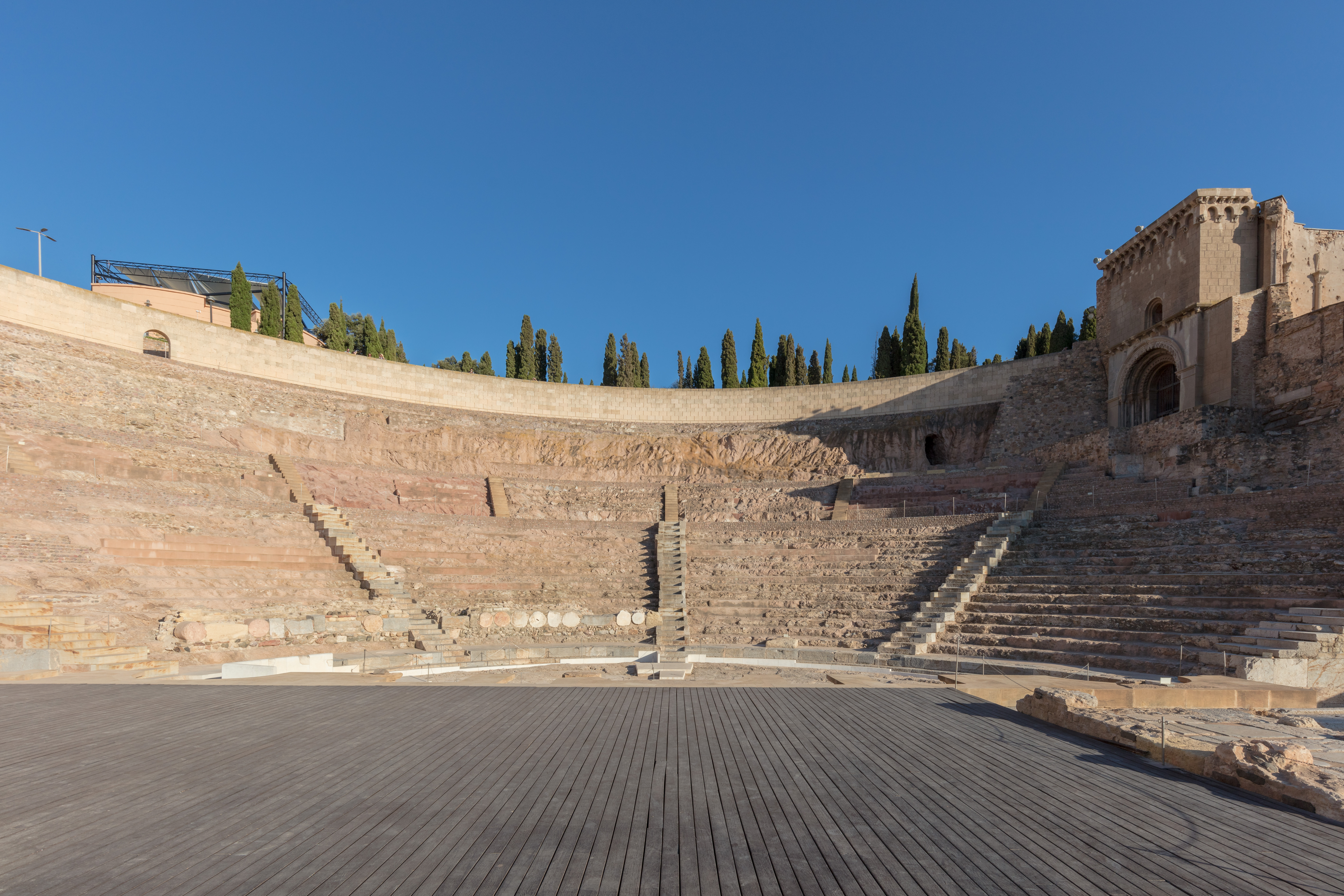
View of the Roman Theatre (front)

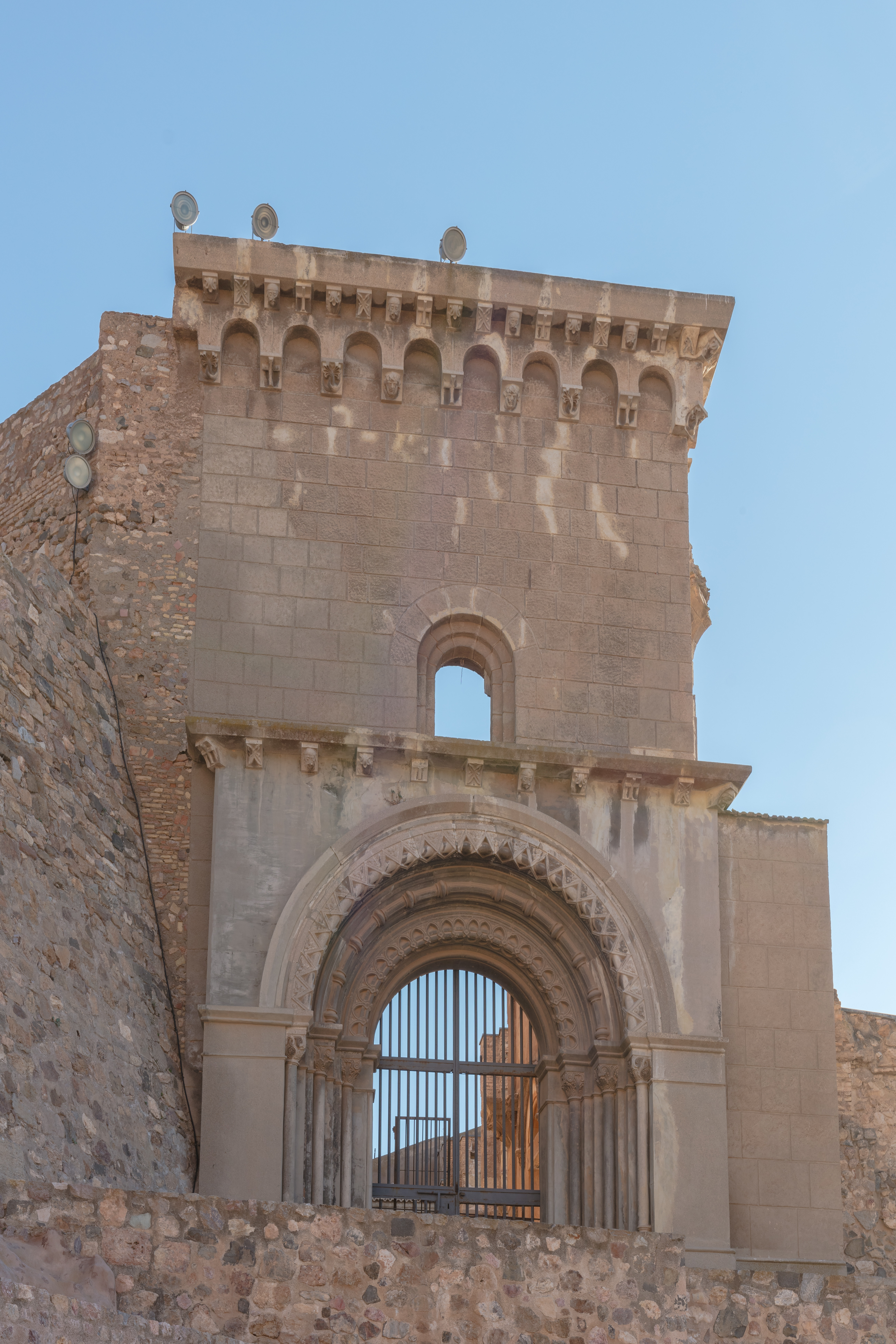
Ruin of a Cathedral above the theater

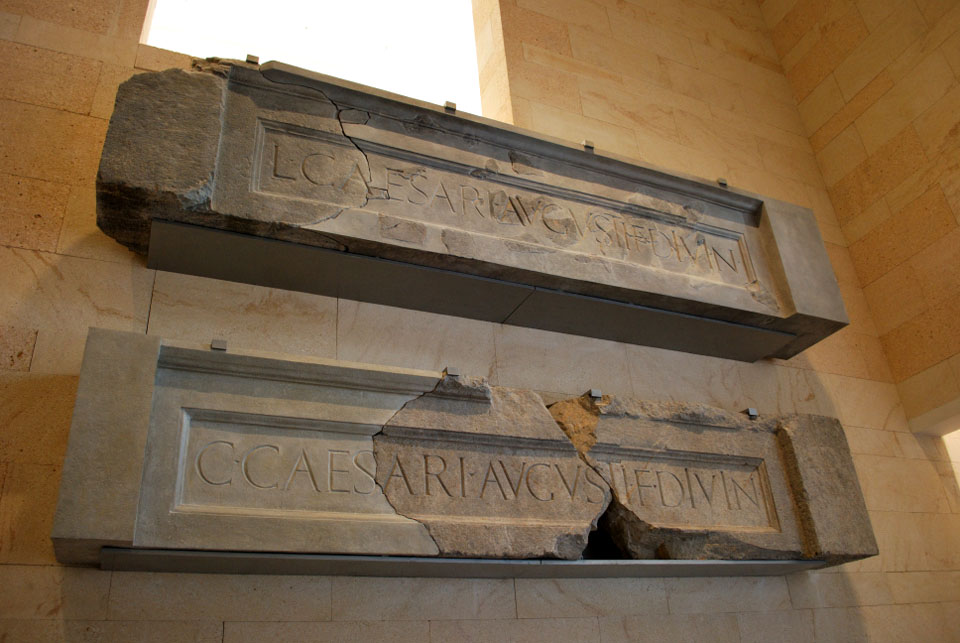
Dedicatory inscriptions to Gaius and Lucius Caesar

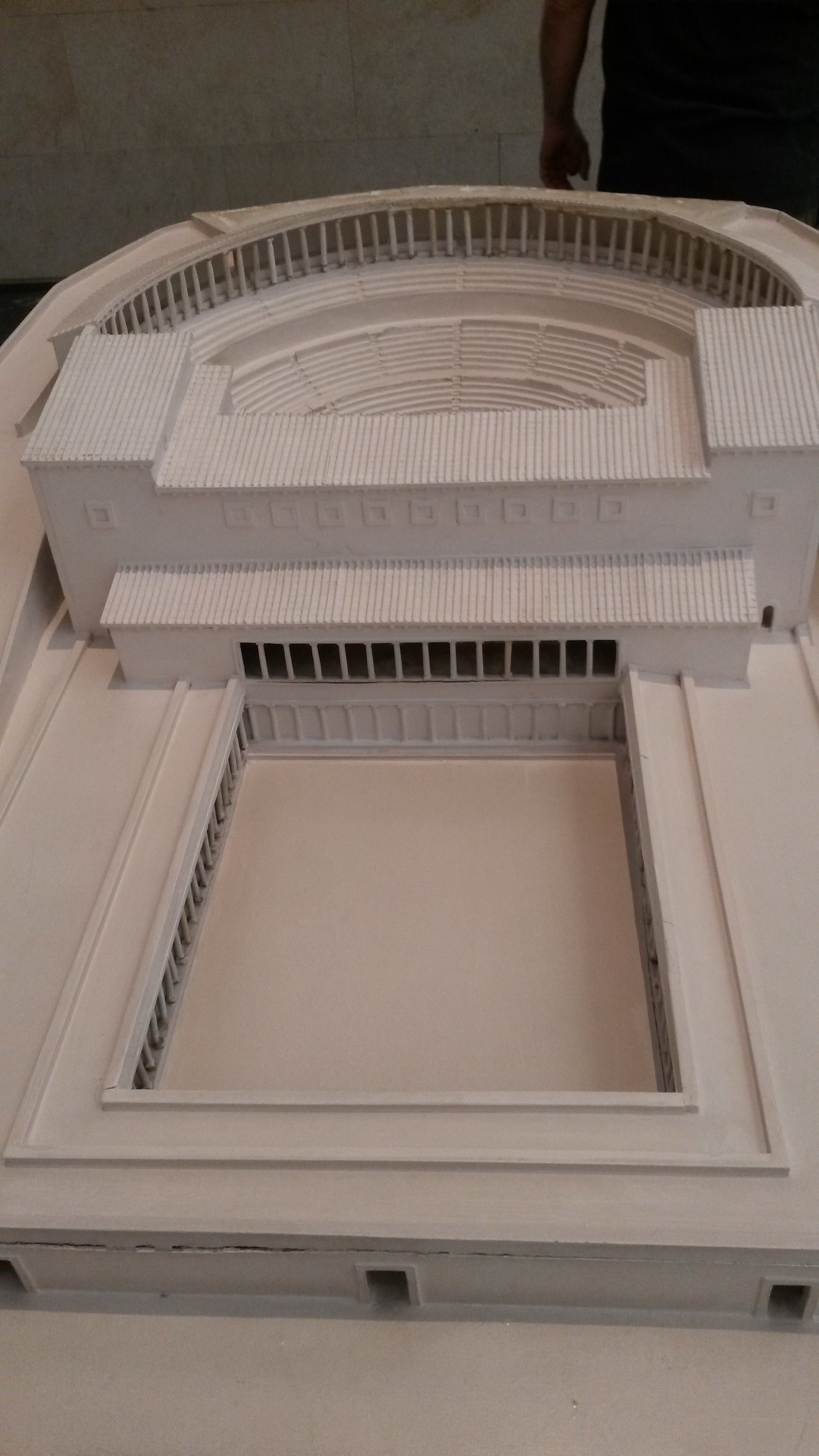
Model reconstruction

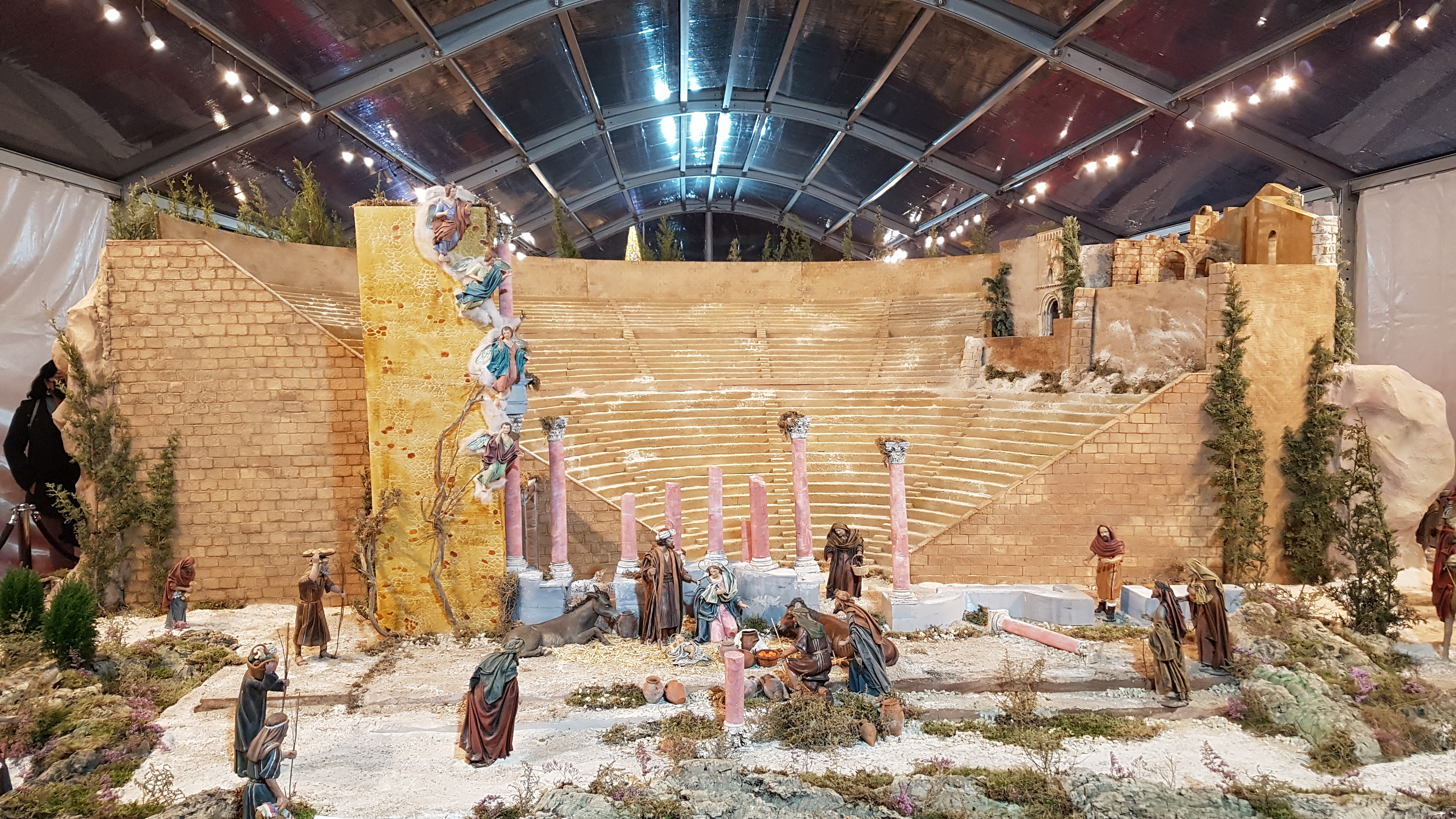
Since 1975, the Christmas nativity scene in Cartagena is set up in a tent in Plaza de San Francisco. It is a tradition that anachronisms are used in the scene, including iconic buildings like the Roman Theatre as the background.

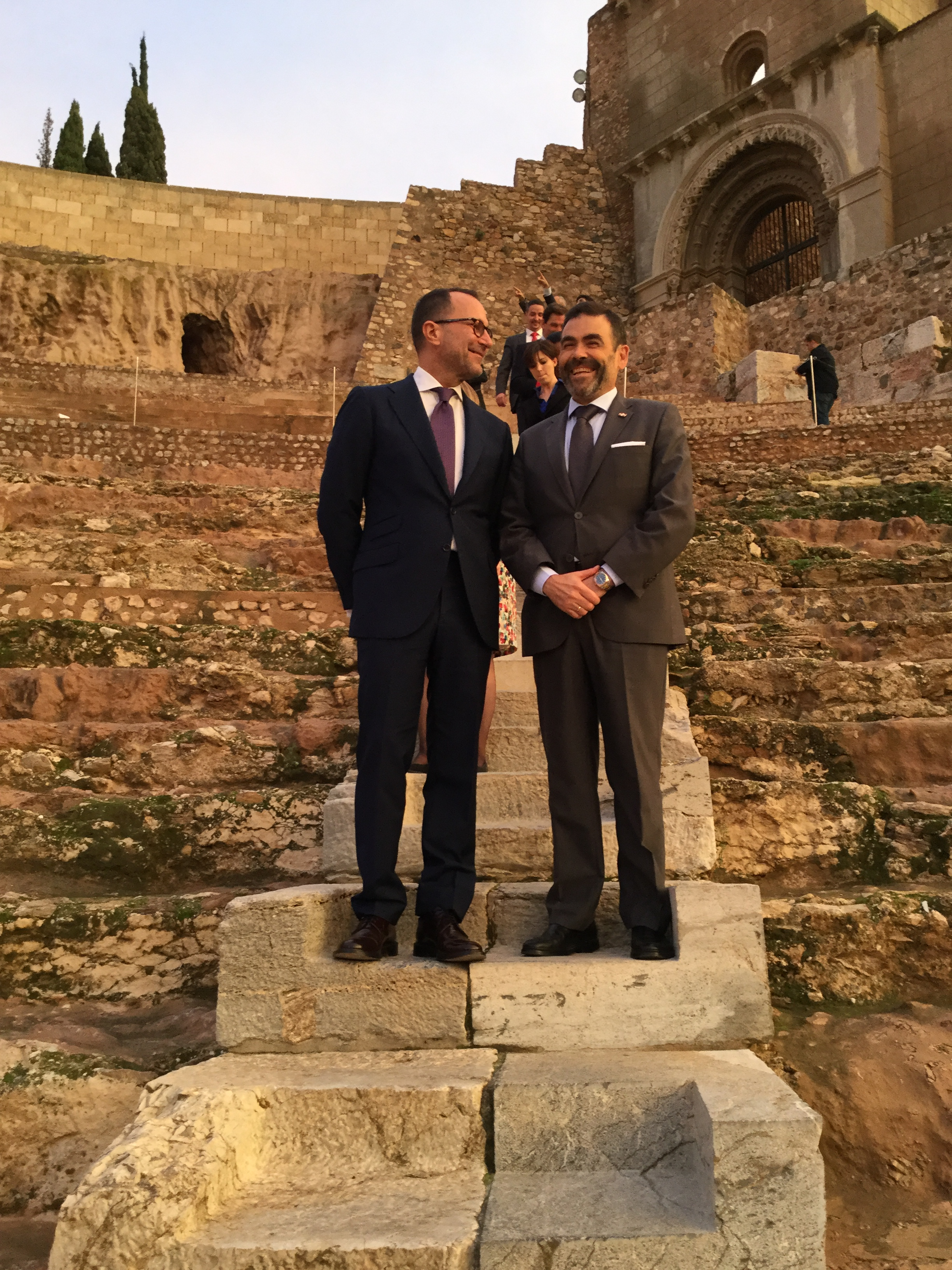
US Ambassador to Spain James Costos (left) with Mayor of Cartagena José López Martínez (politician) (right) at the Roman Theatre during a visit to the Murcia region in November 2015

=== At the Cartagena Archaeological Museum ===
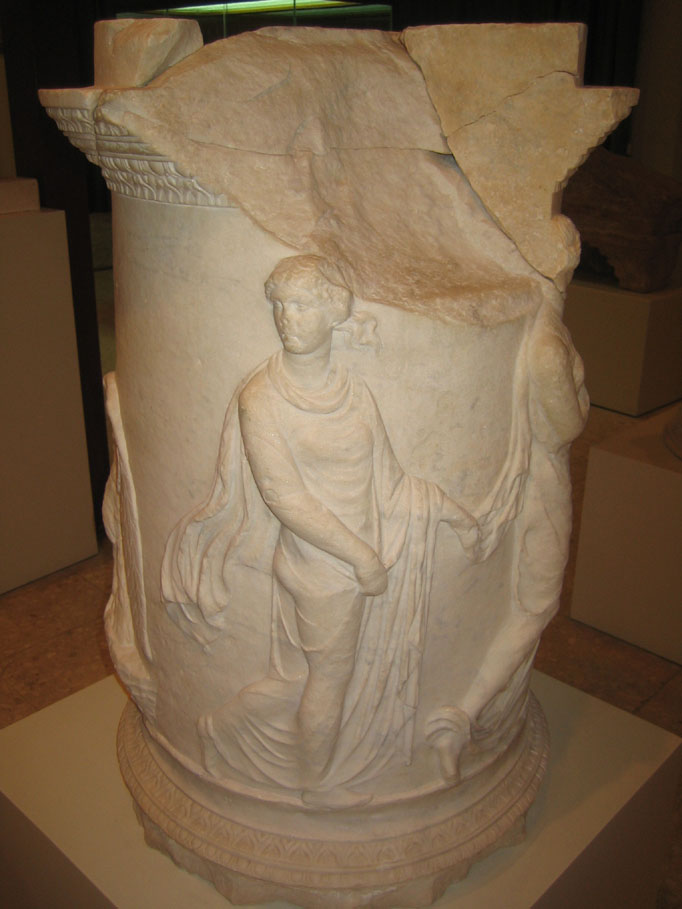
Altar of Jupiter found in the Roman theater of Cartagena

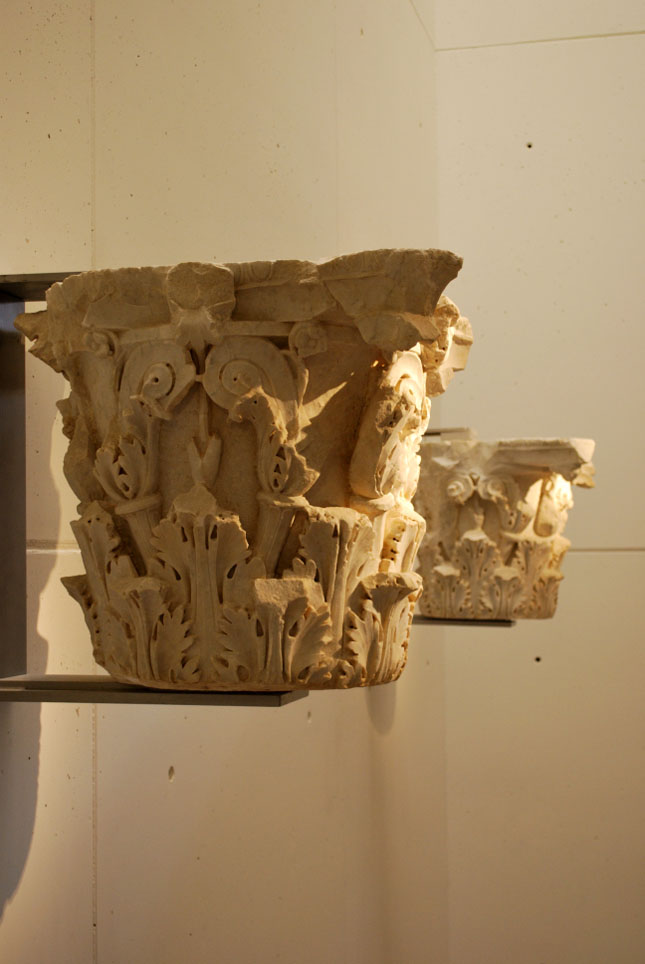
Corinthian capital of the Roman theater of Cartagena

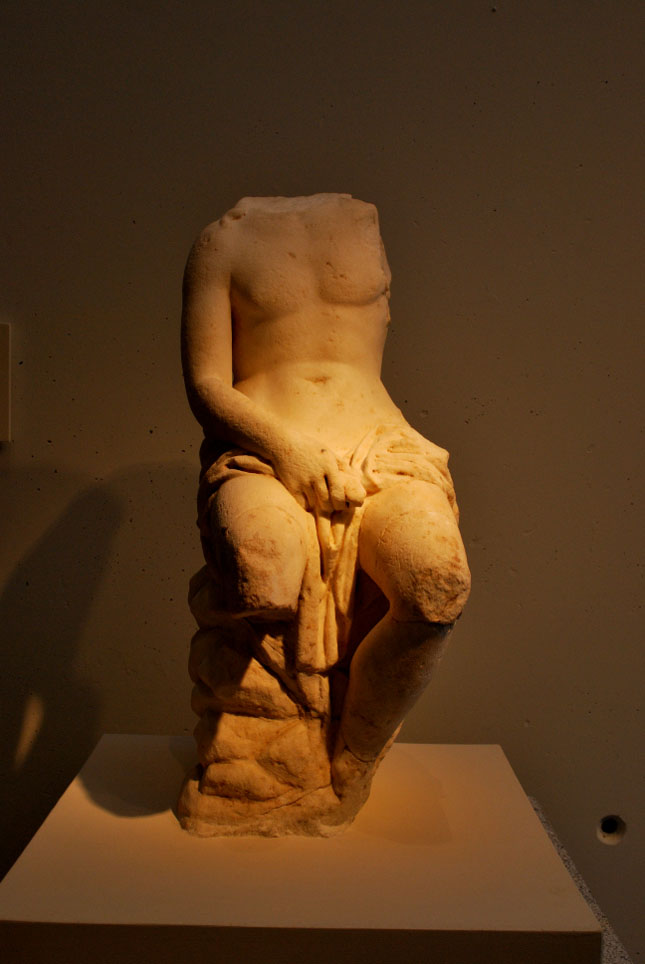
Sculpture of Apollo presented at the Roman theater of Cartagena

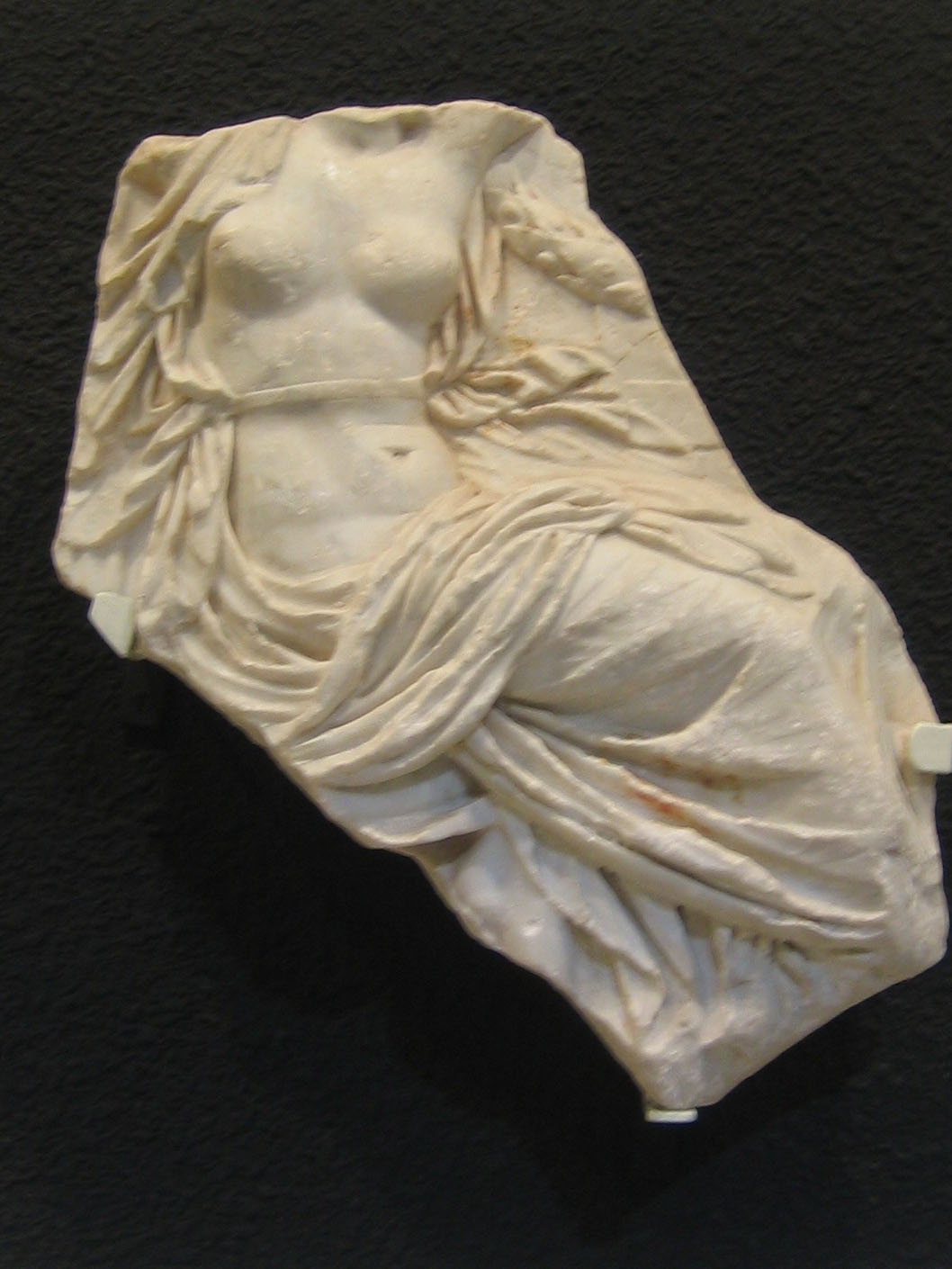
Carved bas-relief of Rea Silvia from the Roman theater of Cartagena

== See also ==
- List of Roman theatres
