= Battle of Cartagena (461) =

Battle in 461

- Part of the Fall of the Roman Empire and Roman–Germanic Wars
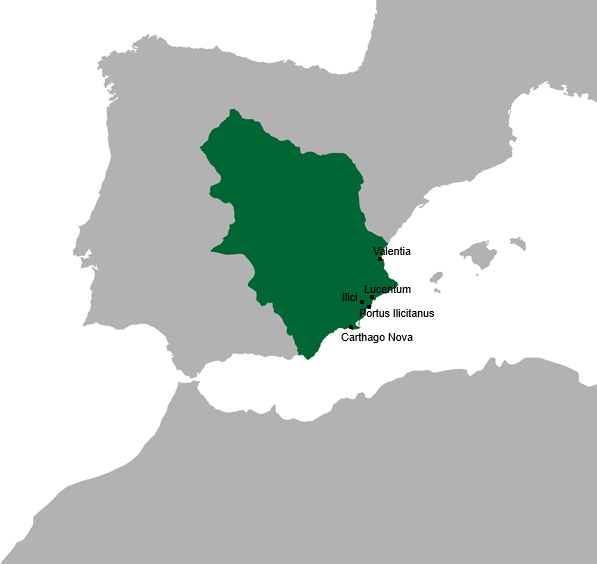
- Although the battle took place on the coast of the province Carthaginensis (green), it was not in the provincial capital Cartagena itself, but 40 nautical miles away in Portus Ilicitanus (Santa Pola)
| Date | 460 or 461 |
| Location | Portus Ilicitanus (today Santa Pola, Spain) |
| Result | Vandal-Alanian victory |

Belligerents
| Kingdom of the Vandals and Alans | Western Roman Empire |

Strength
| Unknown | 300 ships |

Casualties and losses
| Unknown | Unknown |

The Battle of Cartagena occurred on 13 May, 460 or 461 and was part of the wars of Majorian. Although many sources call it battle of Cartagena, the battle did not take place at Cartagena but on the coast of Roman Carthaginensis province at Portus Ilicitanus (today Santa Pola) in the bay of Alicante. Since Portus Ilicitanus was the port of Elche (Ilici), the battle is sometimes referred as battle of Elche.

460: Eo anno captae sunt naves a Vandalis ad Elecem juxta Carthaginem Spartariam.

— Marius Aventicensis, Chronica de obispo de Aventicum

== Background ==
In 457, the Roman general Majorian succeeded to the throne of the Western Roman Empire. He immediately set about restoring the empire to its former boundaries. Majorian then began to assemble a fleet at Portus Ilicitanus (near Ilici), with which he intended to invade the Vandal Kingdom in North Africa.

== Battle ==
By spring 460 (or 461), Majorian had 300 ships already built and he would have had another few more ready by the autumn. The Vandals decided to strike before the Roman navy became unbeatable. On 13 May, a fleet of Vandal ships under the command of King Gaiseric surprised the Roman fleet. Many of the Roman captains had been bribed to switch sides. The Roman navy was totally destroyed, ending any hope of reconquering North Africa.

Mense Maio Majorianus Hispanias ingreditur imperator: quo Carthaginiensem provinciam pertendente, aliquantas naves quas sibi ad transitum adversum Wandalos praeparabat, de littore Carthaginiensi commoniti Wandali per proditores abripiunt. Majorianus ita sua ordinatione frustratus ad Italiam revertitur.

— Hydatius, Chronicon
