= Spania =

Province of the Eastern Roman Empire

Coordinates: 36.7167°N 4.4167°W

Province of Spania Provincia Spaniæ
- Province of the Byzantine (Roman) Empire
- 552–624
- Roman Spania (green) following the retaking of the Guadalquivir Valley by the Visigoths.
- Capital: Malaca (Málaga) or Carthago Spartaria (Cartagena)
- Historical era: Late antiquity
  - Byzantine conquest by Liberius: 552
  - Visigothic reconquest: 624
Preceded by	Succeeded by
Visigothic Kingdom	Visigothic Kingdom
- Today part of: Spain; Portugal; United Kingdom · Gibraltar

Spania (Latin: Provincia Spaniae) was a province of the Eastern Roman Empire from 552 until 624 in the south of the Iberian Peninsula and the Balearic Islands. It was established by the Emperor Justinian I in an effort to restore the western provinces of the Empire.

== Background ==
In 409 the Vandals, Suevi and Alans, who had broken through the Roman border defences on the Rhine two years before, crossed the Pyrenees into the Iberian peninsula. Nevertheless, effective Roman rule was maintained over most areas until after the death of Emperor Majorian in 461. The Visigoths, vassals of the Roman Empire who had settled in Aquitaine by imperial invitation (416), increasingly filled the vacuum left as the Vandals moved into North Africa. In 468 they attacked and defeated the Suevi, who had occupied Roman Gallaecia and were threatening to expand. The Visigoths ended the Roman administration in Spain in 473, and their overlordship of most of the eastern and central peninsula was established by 476. A large-scale migration of the Visigoths into Iberia began in 494 under Alaric II, and it became the seat of their power after they lost most of their territory in Gaul to the Franks after the Battle of Vouillé in 507.

== Conquest and foundation ==
In 534, Roman general Belisarius re-established the Byzantine province of Mauretania with the conquest of the Vandal Kingdom in northern Africa. Despite his efforts, the Vandal king Gelimer had been unable to effect an alliance with the Gothic king Theudis, who probably took the opportunity of the collapse of Vandal authority to conquer Ceuta (Septem) across the Straits of Gibraltar in 533, possibly to keep it out of Byzantine hands. This citadel was nevertheless seized the following year by an expedition dispatched by Belisarius. Ceuta (which was briefly recaptured by the Visigoths in 540) became a part of Mauretania. It was an important base for reconnaissance of Spain in the years leading up to the peninsula's invasion by Justinian's forces in 552.

In 550, during the reign of Agila I, Spain was troubled by a series of revolts, two of which were serious. The citizens of Córdoba rebelled against Gothic or Arian rule and Agila was roundly defeated, his son killed, and the royal treasure lost. He himself retreated to Mérida. The date of the other major revolt cannot be arrived at precisely. Either at the commencement of his reign (549) or as late as 551, a nobleman named Athanagild took Seville, capital of Baetica, and presumed to rule as king in opposition to Agila. Exactly who approached the Byzantines for assistance and when is also disputed; the primary sources are divided. Even the name of the general of the Byzantine army is disputed. Although Jordanes wrote that the Patrician Liberius was its commander:

He [Theudis] was succeeded by Agila, who holds the kingdom to the present day. Athanagild has rebelled against him and is even now provoking the might of the Roman Empire. So Liberius the Patrician is on the way with an army to oppose him.

James J. O'Donnell, in his biography of Liberius, casts doubt on this statement, since the patrician was an octogenarian at the time, and Procopius reports he had returned to Constantinople when the Byzantines invaded Hispania and could not have led the invasion. O'Donnell states that "Jordanes may have heard that Liberius' name was being mentioned for commander of the Spanish expedition, but, in the end, the fact of his relief from command of the forces in Sicily makes the story of his voyage to Spain incredible."

However, according to Isidore of Seville in his History of the Goths, it was Athanagild, in autumn of 551 or winter of 552, who begged Justinian for help. The army was probably sent in 552 and made landfall in June or July. Roman forces landed probably at the mouth of the Guadalete or perhaps Málaga and joined with Athanagild to defeat Agila as he marched south from Mérida towards Seville in August or September 552. The war dragged on for two more years. Liberius returned to Constantinople by May 553 and it is probable that a Byzantine force from Italy, which had only recently been pacified after the Gothic War, landed at Cartagena in early March 555 and marched inland to Baza (Basti) in order to join up with their compatriots near Seville. Their landing at Cartagena was violent. The native population, which included the family of Leander of Seville, was well disposed to the Visigoths and the Byzantine government of the city was forced to suppress their freedoms, an oppression which lasted decades into their occupation. Leander and most of his family fled and his writings preserve the strong anti-Byzantine sentiment.

In late March 555, the supporters of Agila, in fear of the recent Byzantine successes, turned and assassinated him, making Athanagild the king of the Goths. Quickly the new king tried to rid Spain of the Byzantines, but failed. The Byzantines occupied many coastal cities in Baetica and this region was to remain a Byzantine province until its reconquest by the Visigoths barely seventy years later.

The Roman Empire under Justinian I. Justinian's inherited empire in red with his conquests, including Spania, in orange. It is the westernmost province.

== Extent and geography ==
The Byzantine province of Spania never extended very far inland and received relatively little attention from East Roman authorities, probably because it was designed as a defensive bulwark against a Gothic invasion of Africa, which would have been an unnecessary distraction at a time when the Persian Empire was a larger threat in the East. The most important cities of Byzantine Spania were Málaga and Cartagena, the probable landing sites of the Byzantine army, which was renamed from Carthago Nova to Carthago Spartaria. It is unknown which of those two cities was the provincial capital, but it was almost certainly one of them. The cities were the centres of Byzantine power and while a few were retaken by Agila, the ones which were retained were a bulwark against Visigothic attempts at reconquest. The Goths easily ravaged the countryside of Spania but were inept at sieges and the fortified towns were safe centres of Roman administration.

Spania at its greatest extent, with cities indicated and lost territory.

There are few cities which can be confidently considered to have been under Byzantine government in the period. The city of Medina Sidonia (Asidona) was held until 572, when it was reconquered by Leovigild. Gisgonza (also Gigonza, ancient Sagontia) was also held until the reign of Witteric (603–610) and it indicates that the south of the province of Baetica was completely Byzantine from Málaga to the mouth of the Guadalete. In the province of Carthaginiensis, wherein lay its provincial capital Cartagena, the city of Baza was also Byzantine and it probably resisted the inroads of Leovigild into that territory in 570, though it was Visigothic by 589.

Among the cities which have been disputed as being Byzantine, Córdoba is the greatest. Some historians have suspected it of being the first capital of the province of Spania and ascribed the cities of Ecija (Astigi), Cabra (Egabra), Guadix (Acci), and Granada (Illiberris) to the Byzantines on this basis, but there is no positive evidence in the sources of Roman rule in any of these cities. Córdoba was in a state of rebellion, briefly joined by Seville from 566 to 567, until Leovigild put it down in 572. It may have had a local government during this period, or may have recognised Byzantine suzerainty.

Aside from the southern parts of the provinces of Baetica and Carthaginiensis (the southern Levante), the Byzantines also held Ceuta across from the Gibraltar and the Balearic Islands, which had fallen to them along with the rest of the Vandal kingdom. Ceuta, though it had been Visigothic and was destined to be associated with the Iberian peninsula for its subsequent history, was attached to the province of Mauretania Secunda. The Balearics with Baetica and Carthaginiensis formed the new province of Spania. By the year 600 Spania had dwindled to little more than Málaga and Cartagena and the Balearics; it extended no further north than the Sierra Nevada. George of Cyprus recorded only one civitas (city, people) in the province: the "Mesopotamians", though the meaning of this is uncertain. José Soto Chica and Ana María Berenjeno identify this city with modern Algeciras through a translation of the Greek "Mesopotamenoi" to the Arabic "al-Djazirat", of similar meaning.

== Administration ==
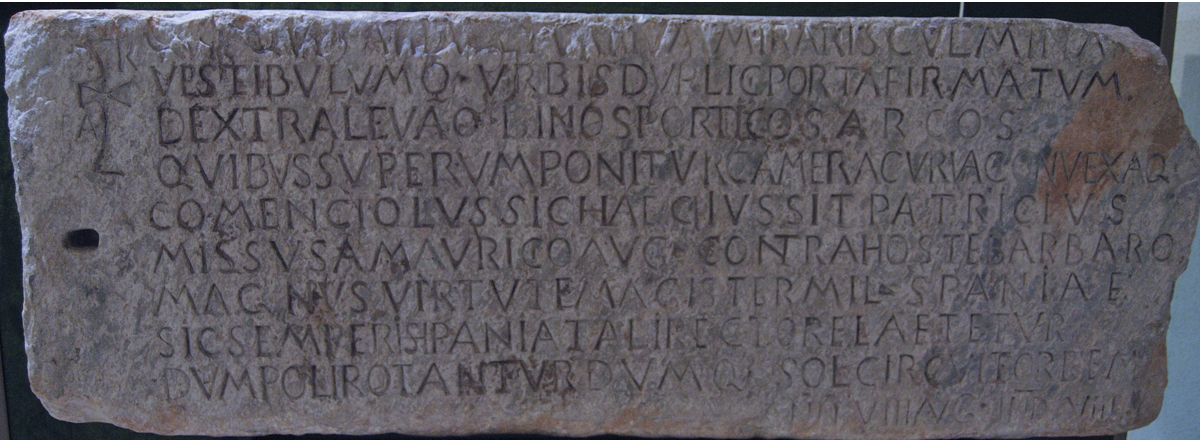
The Lápida de Comenciolo, an inscription from Cartagena recording the patriciate of Comenciolus

=== Secular government ===
The chief administrative official in Spania was the magister militum Spaniae, meaning "master of the military of Spain". The magister militum governed civil and military affairs in the province and was subordinate only to the Emperor. Typically the magister was a member of the highest aristocratic class and bore the rank of patrician. The office, though it only appears in records for the first time in 589, was probably a creation of Justinian, as was the mint, which issued provincial currency until the end of the province (c. 625).

There were five known magistri in the history of the province, though this certainly does not represent the whole. Two are passingly mentioned by Isidore as successive governors in the time of Suinthila, but he omits their names. The first known governor, Comentiolus (possibly), repaired the gates of Cartagena in lieu of the "barbarians" (i.e. the Visigoths) and left an inscription (dated 1 September 589) in the city which survives to this day. It is in Latin and may reflect the continued use of Latin as the administrative language of the province. (It does not, however, imply that Cartagena was the capital of Spania.) Around 600 there was a governor named Comitiolus who bore the rank of gloriosus, the highest rank after that of emperor. The patrician and magister Caesarius made a peace treaty with Sisebut in 614 and conferred with the emperor Heraclius, who was more concerned with matters in Mesopotamia.

The border between Spania and Visigothic kingdom was not closed. Travel between the border for personal and mercantile reasons was allowed and the two regions experienced prolonged periods of peace. The ease of traversing the frontier was noted by the exiled Leander, whose brother more than once crossed it without hindrance. The border had been determined by a treaty (pacta) between Athanagild and Justinian I, but the date of the treaty is still debated. It may have been part of the initial conditions of Byzantine assistance in 551 or 552 or it may have been a product of the war between Goth and Roman in 555 or later. It was certainly signed before Justinian's death in 565. The legitimacy of the pacta was recognised as late as the 7th century, which accounts for the ease of travel and trade.

=== Ecclesiastical government ===
The province of Spania was predominantly Western Christian, while many Byzantine governors were Eastern Christians. Despite this, the relationship between subject and ruler and between church and state seems to have been no better than in Arian Visigothic Spain. The church of Spania was also less independent of the Papacy than the Gothic church, which was composed largely of Hispano-Romans. The two churches were separate. No clerics of one ever attended councils of the other. Indeed, no provincial council ever met in Spania. The theological controversies of each, however, were shared: the one stirred up by Bishop Vincent of Zaragoza's conversion to Arianism sparked a response from the bishop of Málaga.

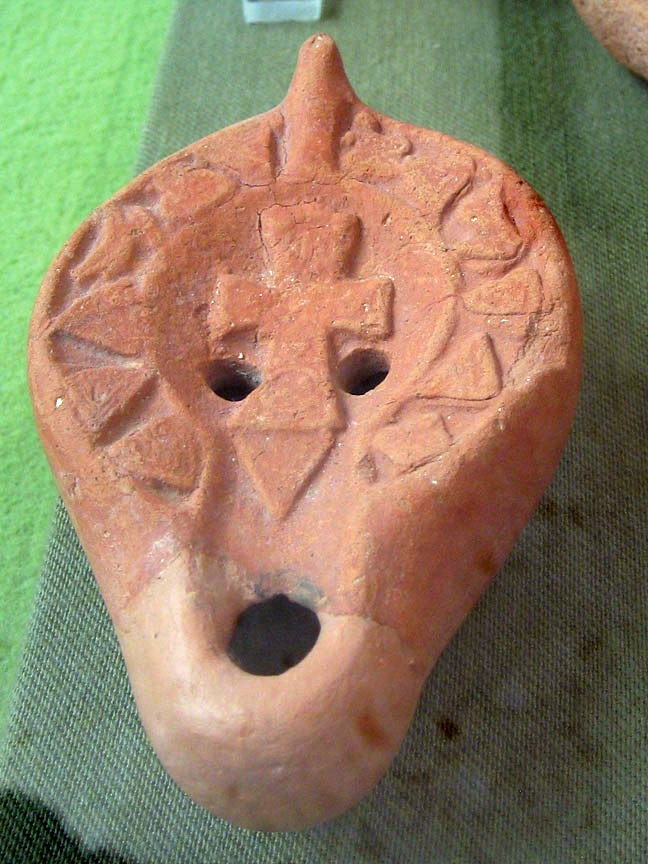
Byzantine oil lamp from Cartagena

Gregory the Great interfered successfully in the various bishoprics of the province more than any pope ever did in the Visigothic kingdom. He came to the defence of the property of two deposed bishops and lorded it over the magister militum Comitiolus, whom he accused of interfering in ecclesiastical affairs. He implicitly accused Licinianus of Cartagena of ordaining ignoramuses to the priesthood, but Licinianus simply replied that to not do so would leave the diocese of the province empty: a sad commentary on the state of clerical education in Spania.

== Culture ==
The architectural and artistic style prevalent in Spania was not that of Byzantium proper but rather the Byzantinist styles of northern Africa. Two churches, one at Algezares south of Murcia and that of San Pedro de Alcántara near Málaga, have been excavated and studied archaeologically. Only in the Balearic Islands did the style of Greece and Thrace take a foothold. And though Byzantine stylistic markers are present throughout Spain, in the Gothic regions they do not share connections with the African styles prevalent in Spania.

In the vicinity of Cartagena, pottery has been discovered bearing distinctively African amphorae that further testify to the close ties between the provinces of Spania and Mauretania Secunda. Cartagena has in recent years been excavated quite thoroughly and a housing complex probably created for Byzantine soldiers occupying the city discovered. Many artefacts of the Byzantine presence can be seen in the Museo Arqueológico de Cartagena. Nevertheless, the city, like most in Spain at that time was much diminished in population and area under the Byzantine government.

== Decline and Visigothic reconquest ==
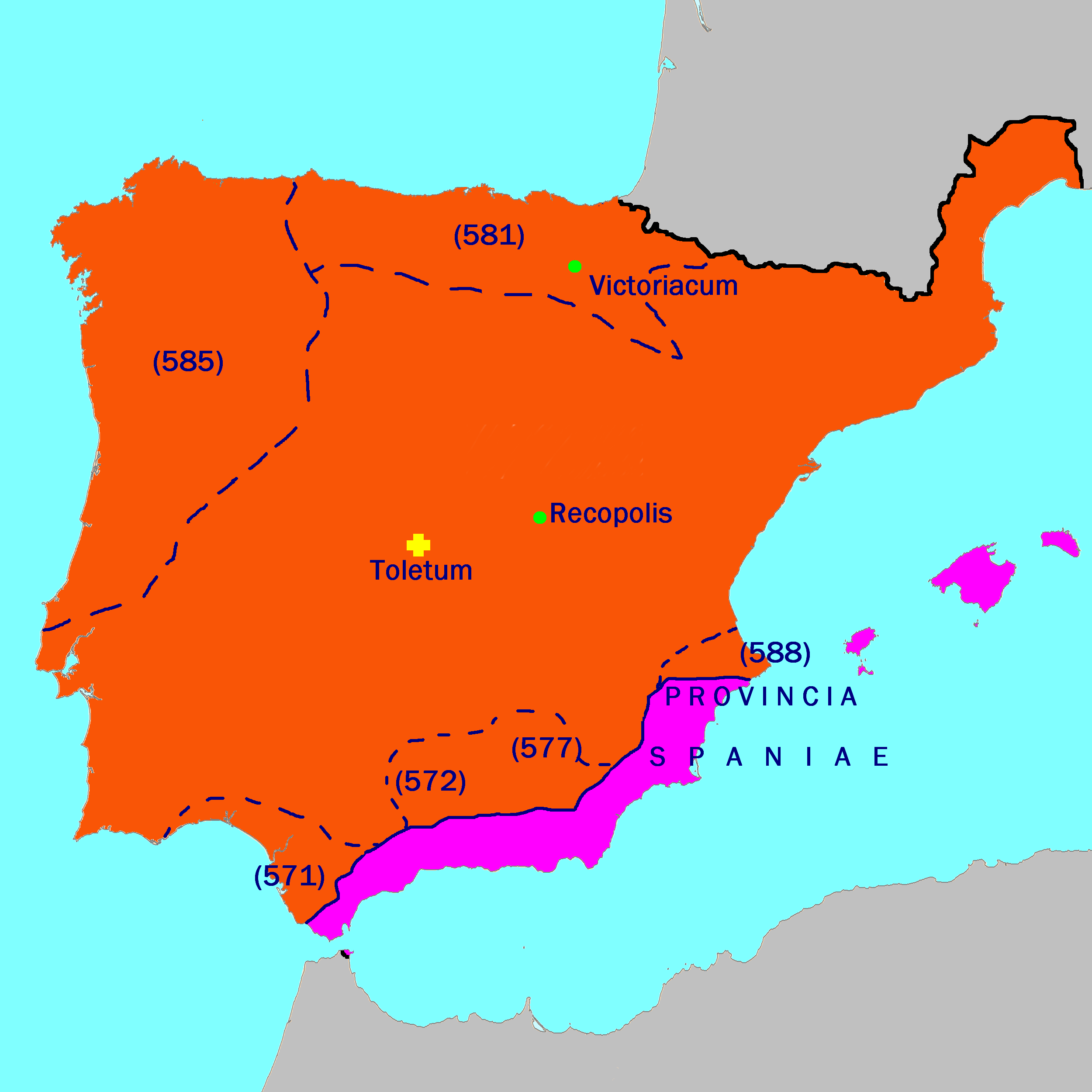
Spania in 586 after the conquests of Leovigild (with dates of conquest on map).

In the reigns of Athanagild and Leovigild, the Byzantines were unable to push their offensive forward and the Visigoths made some successful pushes back. Around 570, Leovigild ravaged Bastetania (Bastitania or Bastania, the region of Baza) and took Medina Sidonia through the treachery of an insider named Framidaneus (possibly a Goth). He may have taken Baza and he certainly raided into the environs of Málaga, defeating a relief army sent from there. He took many cities and fortresses in the Guadalquivir valley and defeated a large army of rustici (rustics), according to John of Biclarum, who may have been referring to an army of bandits called Bagaudae who had established themselves in the disputed buffer zone between Gothic and Roman control. In 577 in Orospeda, a region under Byzantine control, Leovigild defeated more rustici rebellantes, probably Bagaudae. After two seasons of campaigning against the Romans, however, Leovigild concentrated his military efforts elsewhere.

During the rule of Reccared, the Byzantines again took the offensive and probably even regained or gained ground. Reccared recognised the legitimacy of the Byzantine frontier and wrote to Pope Gregory requesting a copy be sent from the Emperor Maurice. Gregory simply replied that the text of the treaty had been lost in a fire during Justinian's reign and warned Reccared that he would not want it found because it would have probably granted the Byzantines more territory than they actually then possessed (August 599). Leovigild's gains against the Roman government were greater than the Roman reconquests of Reccared's reign; the Byzantine province of Spania was in decline.

Among later kings, Witteric campaigned frequently against Spania, though his generals were more successful than he. The latter captured the small town of Gisgonza. Gundemar moved the primatial see of Carthaginiensis from Byzantine Cartagena to Visigothic Toledo in 610 and campaigned against Spania in 611, but to no effect. Sisebut more than any king before him became the scourge of the Byzantines in Spain. In 614 and 615, he carried out two massive expeditions against them and conquered Málaga before 619, when its bishop appears at the Second Council of Seville. He conquered as far as the Mediterranean coast and razed many cities to the ground, enough even to catch the attention of the Frankish chronicler Fredegar:

. . . et plures civitates ab imperio Romano Sisebodus litore maris abstulit et usque fundamentum destruxit.

. . . king Sisbodus took many cities from the Roman empire along the coast, destroying them and reducing them to rubble.

Sisebut probably also razed Cartagena, which was so completely desolated that it never reappeared in Visigothic Spain. Because the Goths were unable to undertake decent sieges, they were forced to reduce the defences of all fortified places they took in order to prevent later armies from using them against them. Because Cartagena was destroyed but Málaga was spared, it has been inferred that the former fell first while the Byzantine presence was still large enough to constitute a threat. Málaga fell some time after when the Byzantines were so reduced as to no longer form a danger to Visigothic hegemony over the whole peninsula.

In 621, the Byzantines still held a few towns, but Suinthila recovered them shortly and by 624 the entire province of Spania was in Visigothic hands save the Balearic Islands, which were an economic backwater in the 7th century. Like the Sardinian giudicati and Corsica in that period, the Balearics were only nominally Byzantine. They were finally separated from the Empire by the Saracen incursions of the 8th through 10th centuries.

Sometime during the joint reign of Egica and Wittiza, a Byzantine fleet raided the coasts of southern Spain and was driven off by a local count named Theudimer. The dating of this event is disputed: it may have occurred as part of Leontius' expedition to relieve Carthage, under assault by the Arabs, in 697; perhaps later, around 702; or perhaps late in Wittiza's reign. What is almost universally accepted is that it was an isolated incident connected with other military activities (probably against the Arabs or Berbers) and not an attempt to reestablish the lost province of Spania. As Professor Thompson states, "We know nothing whatever of the context of this strange event."

== Sources ==
=== Primary ===
- Fredegar; John Michael Wallace-Hadrill, trans. (1960). The Fourth Book of the Chronicle of Fredegar with its Continuations. Connecticut: Greenwood Press. Archived from the original on 3 February 2006.
- Jordanes; Charles C. Mierow, trans. The Origin and Deeds of the Goths.

=== Secondary ===
- Bachrach, B. S. (1973). "A Reassessment of Visigothic Jewish Policy, 589–711". The American Historical Review. 78 (1): 11–34. doi:10.2307/1853939. JSTOR 1853939.
- Collins, R. (2004). Visigothic Spain, 409–711. Oxford: Blackwell.
- Grierson, Philip (1955). "Una ceca bizantina en españa". Numario Hispánico. 4 (8): 305–14.
- Helal Ouriachen, El Housin (2009). La ciudad bética durante la Antigüedad Tardía: Persistencias y mutaciones locales en relación con la realidad urbana del Mediterraneo y del Atlántico. Granada: Universidad de Granada.
- Thompson, E. A. (1969). The Goths in Spain. Oxford: Clarendon. Cf. the appendix "The Byzantine Province", pp. 320–34.
- Vallejo Girvés, Margarita (2012). Hispania y Bizancio: Una relación desconocida. Madrid: Akal.
- Wallace-Hadrill, J. M. (1967). The Barbarian West, 400–1000 (3rd ed.). London: Hutchison.
- Wood, Jamie (2010). "Defending Byzantine Spain: Frontiers and Diplomacy". Early Medieval Europe. 18 (3): 292–319. doi:10.1111/j.1471-8847.2010.00300.x. S2CID 153988205.
