= Second Council of Seville =

The Second Council of Seville (or Seville II) was a synod of the ecclesiastical province of Baetica held in 619. It took place in the metropolis of Seville under the Archbishop Isidore. It was the first synod in Baetica since 592. It came shortly after a military campaign by the King Sisebut reincorporated a large part of Baetica into the Visigothic kingdom. This territory had previously been part of the Byzantine province of Spania. Its reincorporation would allow the bishop of Málaga to attend the synod.

The Second Council of Seville dealt solely with ecclesiastical and theological matters—diocesan rights, noncanonical ordinations, unjust clerical depositions, territorial jurisdictional disputes—and laid out procedures, often based on Roman vulgar law, for resolving them. Many canons were devoted to refuting a certain Gregory, described as a Syrian bishop of the Acephali (literally, "headless"), which in context means those who denied the Three Chapters (i.e., headings). Gregory attended the synod in person. The council did not address the laity of Baetica, nor the Visigothic state, although two royal officials were in attendance: Sisiclus, the director of public affairs (rector rerum publicarum), and Suanila, the director of fiscal affairs (rector rerum fiscalium).

The canons of the Second Council of Seville were copied into the Hispana, a great collection of Iberian and African conciliar records, later in the seventh century. A Third Council of Seville (or Seville III) appears to have met around 624, but its canons were subsequently suppressed.
