= Municipal Archaeological Museum of Cartagena =

Coordinates: 37.6154°N 0.9940°W

Municipal Archaeological Museum "Enrique Escudero de Castro"
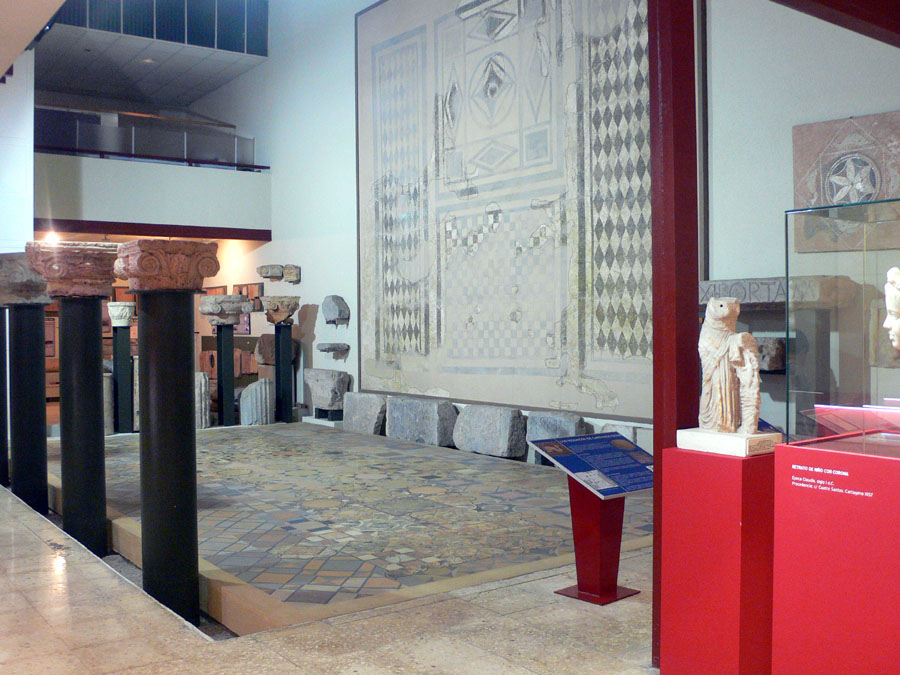
- Interior view of the museum
- Established: 1982
- Director: Miguel Martín Camino
- Website: museoarqueologico.cartagena.es

The Municipal Archaeological Museum of Cartagena is an institution dedicated to the conservation, study, and exhibition of archaeological artifacts related to the municipality of Cartagena in the Region of Murcia, Spain. It is part of the Regional Network of Museums of Murcia.

== History ==
Founded on October 25, 1943, its first director was Antonio Beltrán Martínez. The Municipal Archaeological Museum was created from various archaeological collections, mainly a valuable set of Roman inscriptions preserved by the city of Cartagena since the late 16th century. The museum's initial location was on the ground floor of the building that now houses the Royal Economic Society of Friends of the Country in Cartagena on Calle del Aire.

Since the late 19th century, the Economic Society had been gathering an archaeological collection composed mainly of pieces from the mining district of Cartagena-La Unión, culminating in 1883 with the foundation of the Mineralogical and Antiquities Museum, which later served as the basis for the Municipal Archaeological Museum. In 1945, the museum was relocated to a building on the former Calle Baños del Carmen (now Plaza de Juan XXIII) to accommodate the increasing number of collections gathered since its opening.

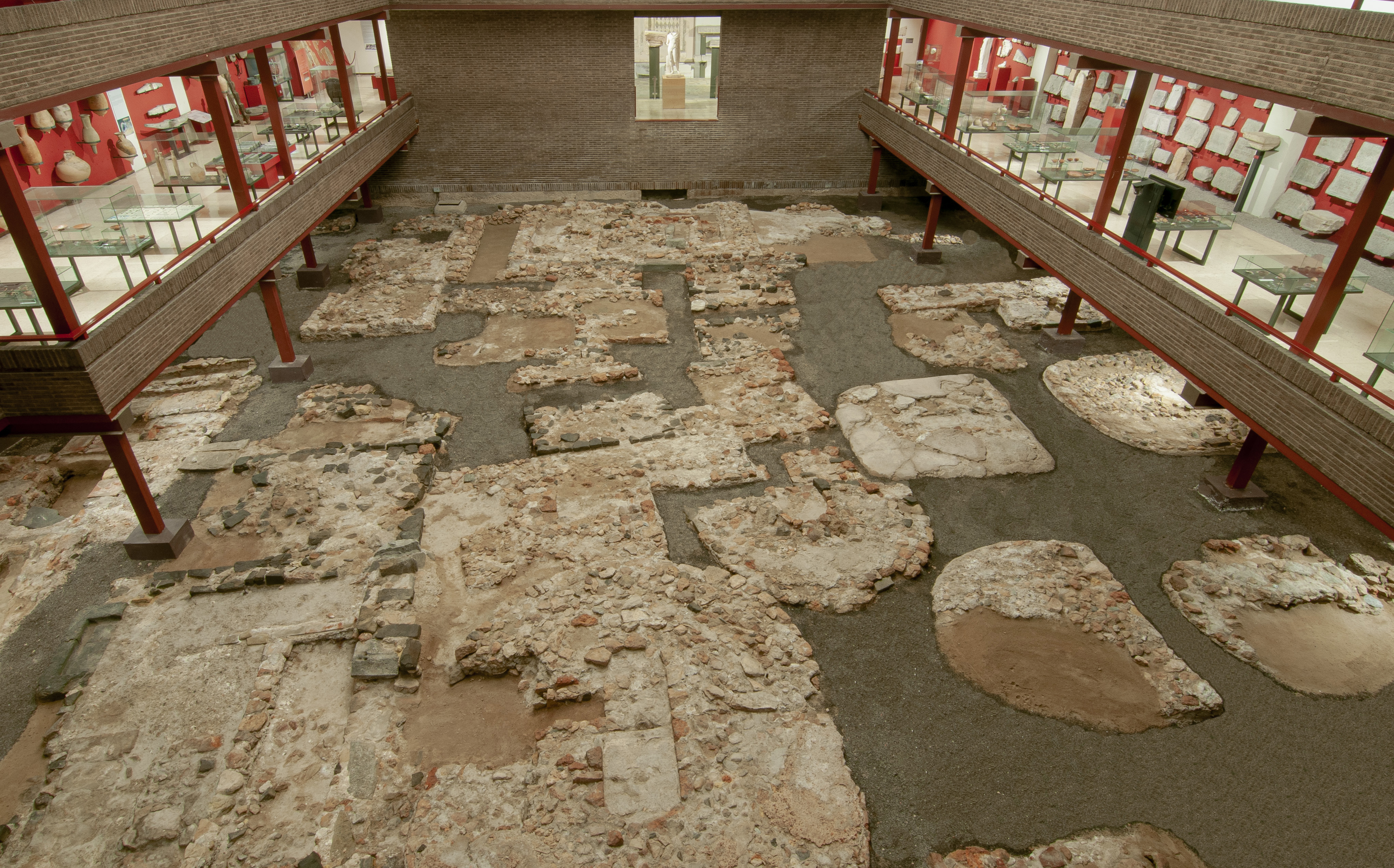
View of the San Antón Necropolis. The museum was built around this site.

Following the discovery of the San Antón Necropolis in 1967, museum director Pedro San Martín proposed to the city council the construction of a new museum building around the archaeological site to allow its conservation in situ.

The city council later acquired the land and financed the adaptation of the museum, which was eventually inaugurated in 1982 after significant delays.

== Exhibition ==
The museum follows an educational approach in its exhibition design, organizing artifacts chronologically on the first floor and thematically by site and excavation on the second floor. At the center, the necropolis serves as the main archaeological site and can be observed from various points along the museum's permanent exhibition route.

The displayed materials range from the Middle Paleolithic to modern times, although, given Cartagena's strong Roman influence, the most numerous and best-presented artifacts belong to this period. Notable exhibits include the Latin epigraphy collection alongside ceramics, architectural elements, sculptures, construction materials, mining artifacts, and trade-related objects, reflecting the city's different historical phases.

Ongoing archaeological excavations in the historic center, under which the ancient Carthago Nova lies, continuously provide new artifacts and valuable historical insights into the history of Cartagena. To support this research, the museum has annexed facilities equipped with workspaces, a library, workshops, and photographic and restoration laboratories. The museum is also part of the annual event "The Night of Museums," during which free access is granted to visitors.

== Image Gallery ==
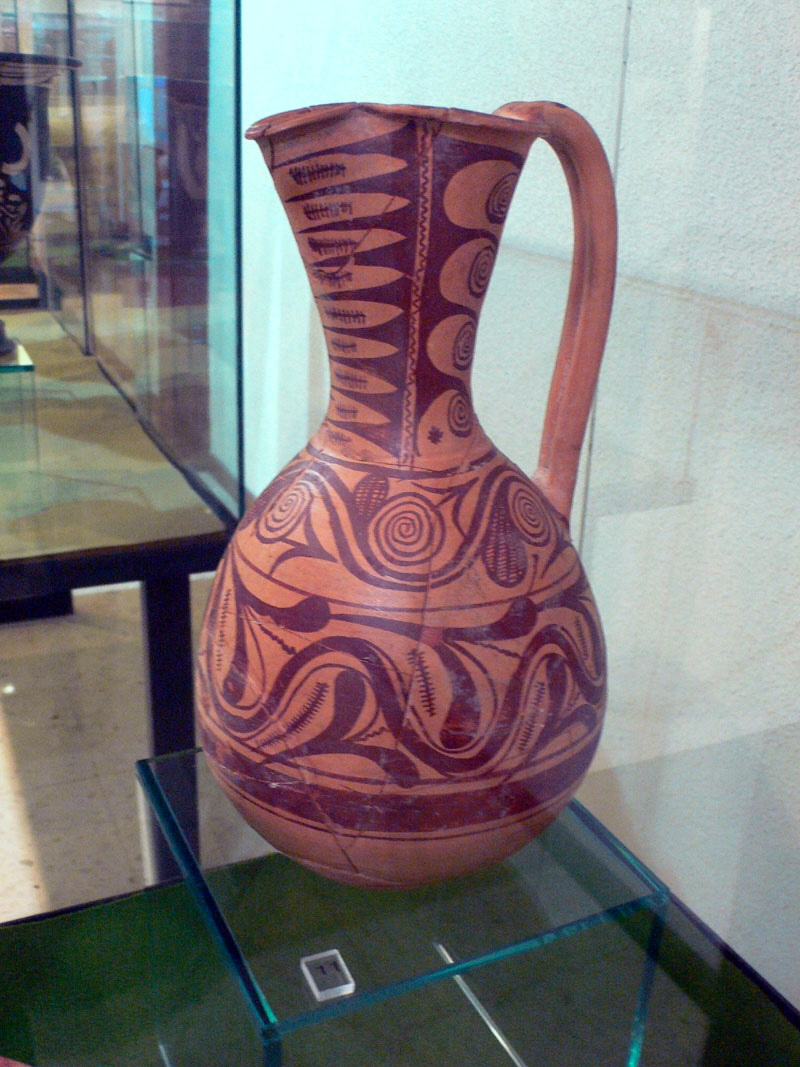
Iberian oinochoe

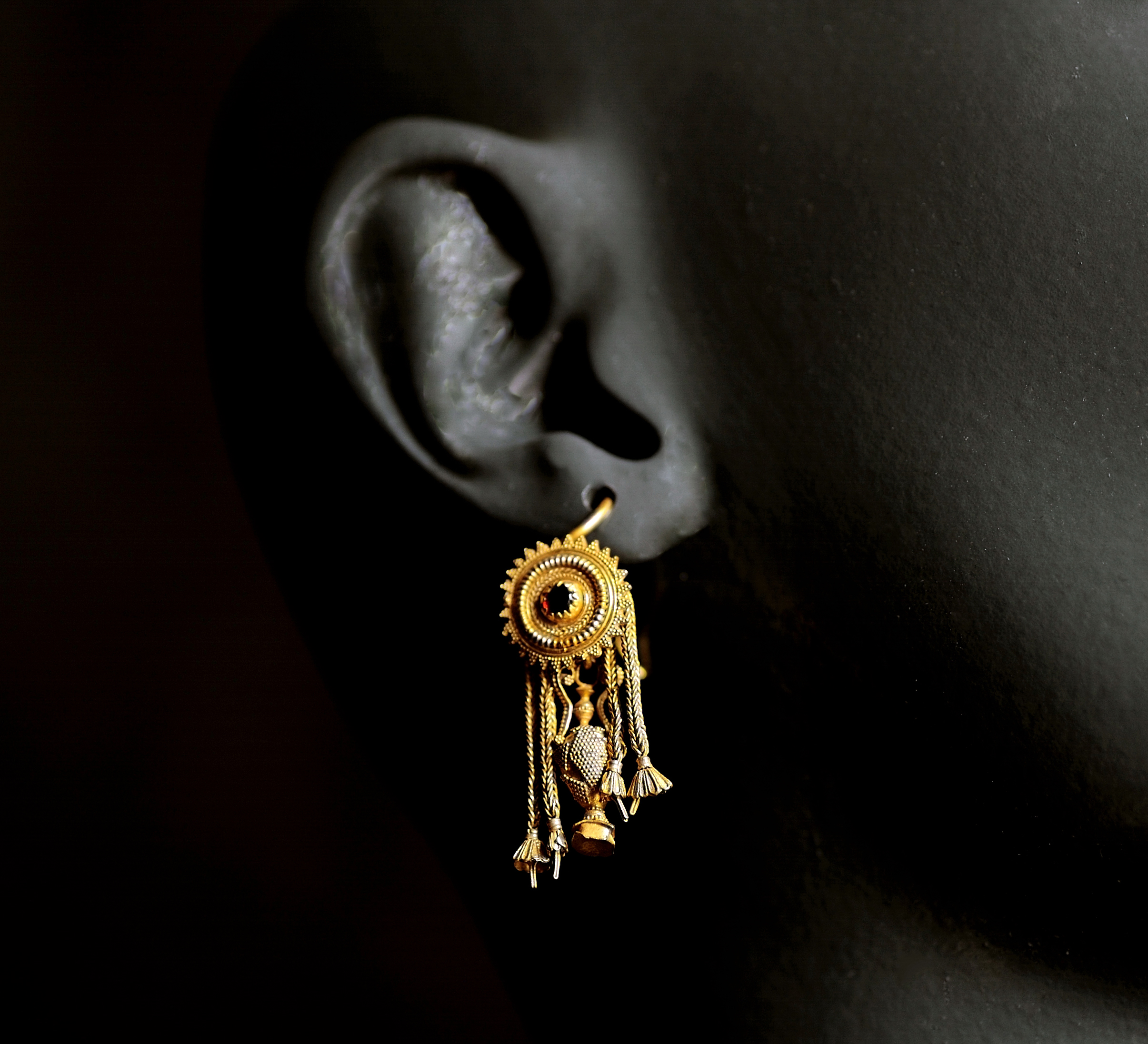
Hellenistic earring (2nd century BC), excavated from the Roman amphitheater of Cartagena

== See also ==
- Museum of Archaeology of Murcia
