= Mastia =

Mastia (or Massia of the Tartessians) is an ancient Iberian settlement, belonging to the Tartessian confederation, once located in southeastern Spain. It has traditionally been associated with the city of Cartagena (Spain). The association has been made principally from the analysis of classical sources in the early 20th century by Adolf Schulten.

The first description of the city of Mastia appears in a poem entitled Ora Maritima (Sea Coasts) by the Latin poet Rufius Festus Avienius from the 4th-century AD. The poem claims to contain borrowings from the mythic 6th-century BC Massiliote Periplus. The description of Avienus reads:

... then is Namnatius portus that from the sea opens its curve near the town of Massienos, and at the bottom of the Gulf rise the high walls of the city of Massiena ...

— Rufius Festus Avienus, Ora Maritima.

However, there is currently no conclusive evidence that the Mastia of Avienus refers to the same site where Cartagena will be founded. Context and other geographic descriptions that precede and follow these lines suggest that it could refer to the same location. Some scholars locate Mastia somewhere near the ancient city of Carteia (near modern Gibraltar), at the head of the Bay of Algeciras.

In addition to the Ora Maritima, there is also a reference to Mastia in the treaty between Rome and Carthage of 348 BC, as Μαστια Ταρσειων (Mastia of the Tartessians), which marked the Roman boundary on the Iberian Peninsula.

For Hecataeus of Miletus know that some cities were dependent on or under the influence of Mastia field and mentioned:

- Sixos of the Mastians. The only one that can be confidently identified. It corresponds to the current Sexi (Almuñécar)
- Maniobora of the Mastians.
- Molybdine of the Mastians.
- Syalis of the Mastians.

Its mineral wealth, fisheries, and agriculture was the cause of the Kingdom of Tartessos keeping it in their area of influence.
