= Hispania Carthaginensis =

Roman province on the Iberian Peninsula (27 BC-459 AD)

Coordinates: 38.0000°N 1.0000°W

Provincia Hispania Carthaginensis
- Province of the Roman Empire
- 298–466
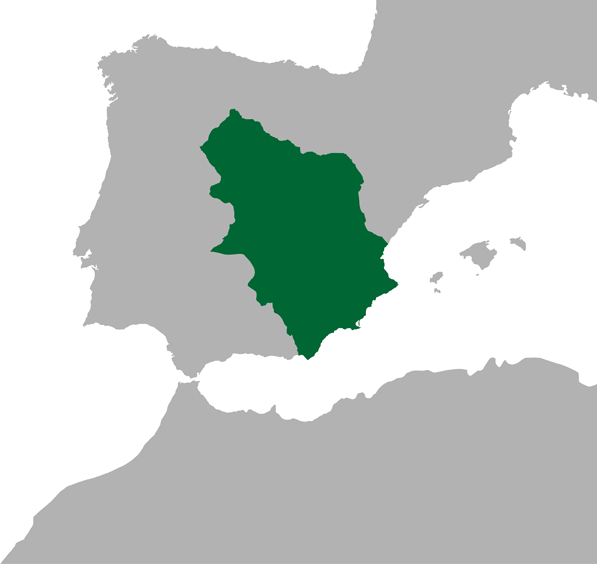
- Capital: Carthago Nova
- Historical era: Late Antiquity
  - Separation from Tarraconensis by emperor Diocletian.: 298
  - Brief Alanic occupation of Carthaginensis: 410–418
  - Brief Suebian occupation of Carthaginensis: 446–456
  - Visigothic conquest: 466
Preceded by	Succeeded by
Hispania Tarraconensis	Visigothic Kingdom
- Today part of: Spain

Hispania Carthaginiensis or Carthaginensis (Latin for "Carthaginian Spain") was a province of the Roman Empire with its capital at Carthago Nova ("New Carthage", modern Cartagena). It covered the central Mediterranean coast of Spain around the city and its hinterland into central Iberia.

== History ==
Hispania Carthaginensis was created from Hispania Tarraconensis by the emperor Diocletian in 298 as part of his reorganization of the Empire’s provincial system.

The province was peaceful until the invasions of Iberia by nomadic tribes from Eastern Europe in the early 5th century, that in 410 brought the region temporarily under the rule of the Alans. In 418, Emperor Honorius and the Magister militum, Constantius III permitted the Goths to overthrow the Alans. The province went quiet for the next two decades. After the conquests of King Rechila, the region came under the control of the Suebi, in the 440s to 450s. Roman rule was briefly re-established, by another Visigothic expedition in 456, but was lost to the Suebi just a decade later, under the ambitious and war hungry king Euric.

== See also ==
- Roman Spain and Hispania Tarraconensis
- Romanization of Hispania
