= The Continence of Scipio (painting) =

The Continence of Scipio is the name of the following paintings:

- The Continence of Scipio (Bellini), a 1507–1508 oil-on-canvas painting by Giovanni Bellini
- The Continence of Scipio (Gerbrand van den Eeckhout), a c. 1653 painting by Gerbrand van den Eeckhout
- The Continence of Scipio (Pittoni), a c. 1732–1735 oil-on-canvas painting by Giambattista Pittoni
- The Continence of Scipio (Poussin), a 1640 oil-on-canvas painting by Nicolas Poussin
- The Continence of Scipio (Batoni), a 1771 oil-on-canvas painting by Pompeo Batoni
