= Alucio =

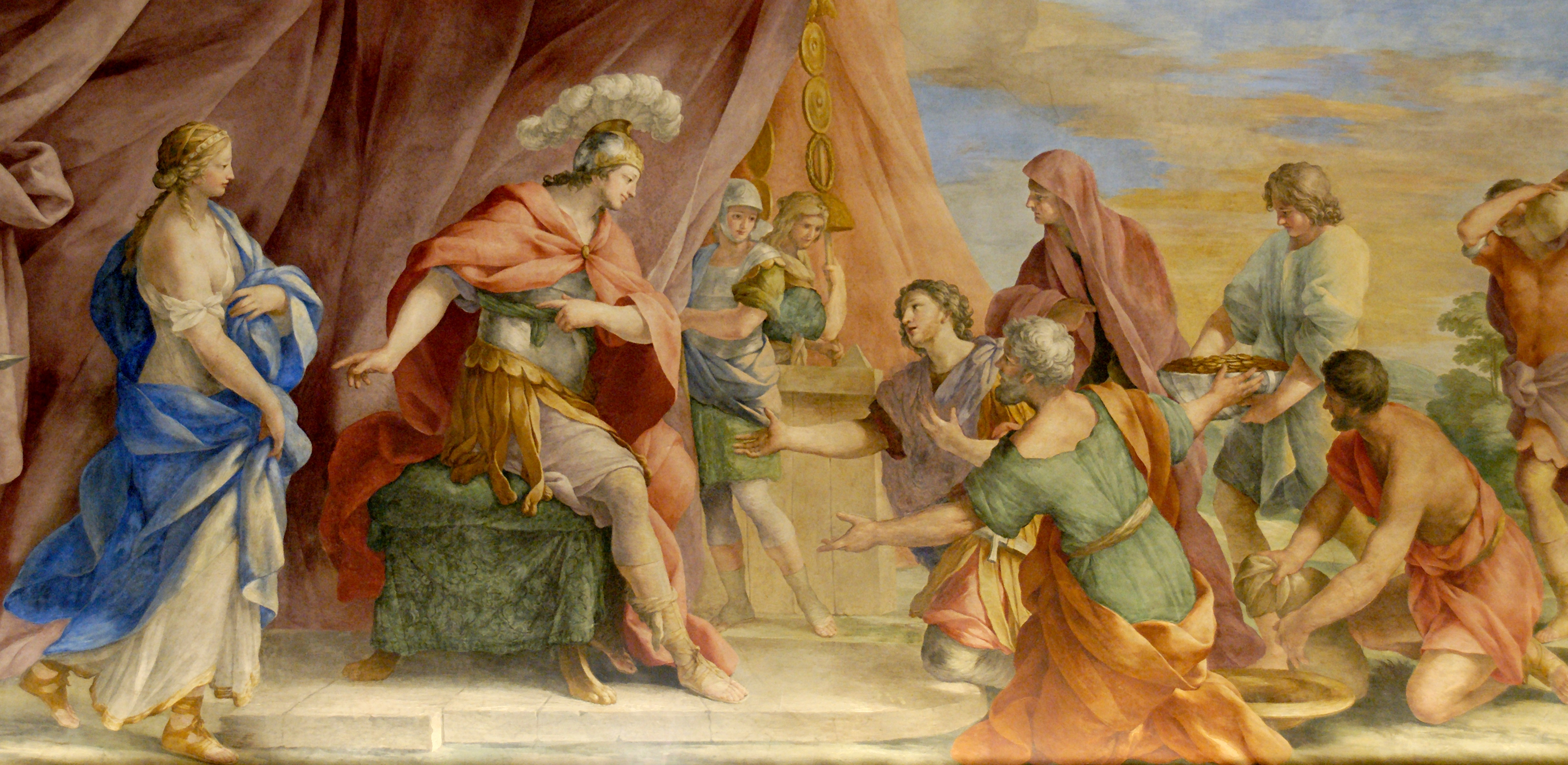
- The Continence of Scipio by Giovanni Francesco Romanelli.
- Born: Celtiberia
- Known for: Role in the Second Punic War

Alucio or Allucio (Latin: Aluccius) was a Celtiberian prince from an unidentified tribe near the walls of Qart Hadasht (modern Cartagena, Spain).

Due to the Carthaginian Iberian policy of holding the relatives of indigenous leaders to ensure their loyalty, Alucio's beautiful fiancée was in Qart Hadasht, the capital of the Punic territories, in 209 BC when the city was captured by the Roman Republic under Scipio Africanus during the Second Punic War.

Following the conquest, Scipio demanded a ransom for the princess. Deeply in love, Alucio gathered a vast treasure and presented it to the Roman general. Moved by the lovers' plight, Scipio freed the woman and returned the ransom as a dowry for their wedding.

In gratitude for Scipio's gesture, Alucio provided 1,400 cavalrymen to support the Roman army and gifted him a buckler (a shield made of silver, abundant in the Carthaginian mines of that time). Scipio later lost the gift while crossing the Rhône River, and it was allegedly found in 1665 by fishermen who retrieved it in their nets.

This episode, known in art history as The Clemency of Scipio, is recorded by Roman historians Livy, Silius Italicus, Appian, and Cassius Dio, who used it to extol Scipio's magnanimous behavior.
