= The Continence of Scipio =

Artistic theme based on an episode of Roman history

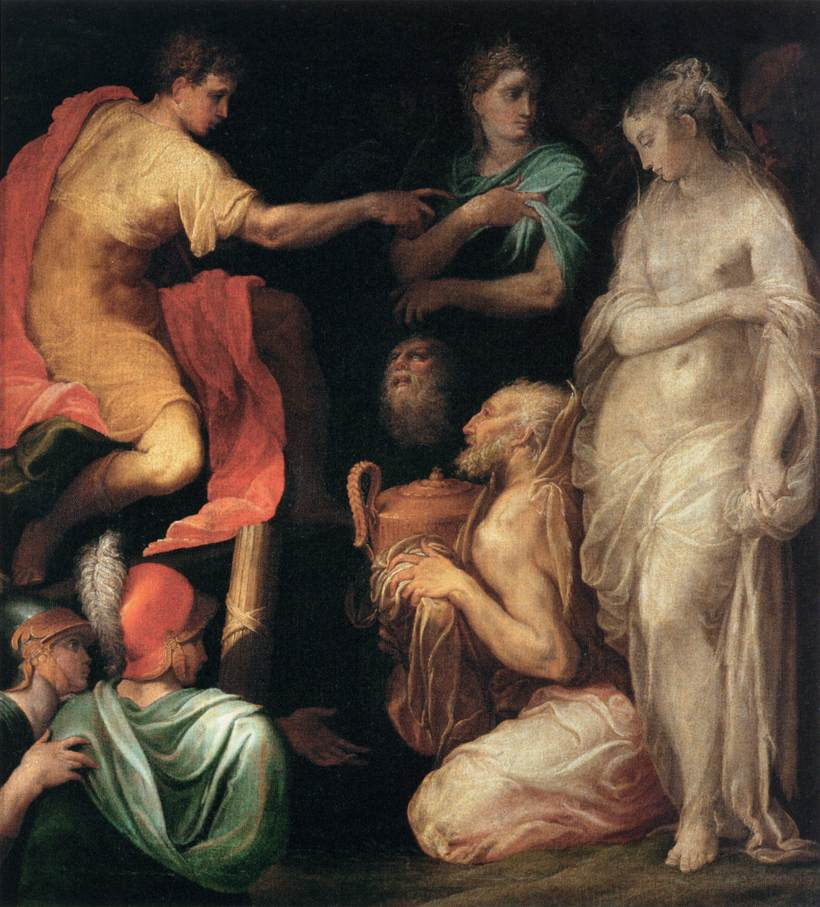
Nicolò dell'Abate, The Continence of Scipio, c. 1555.

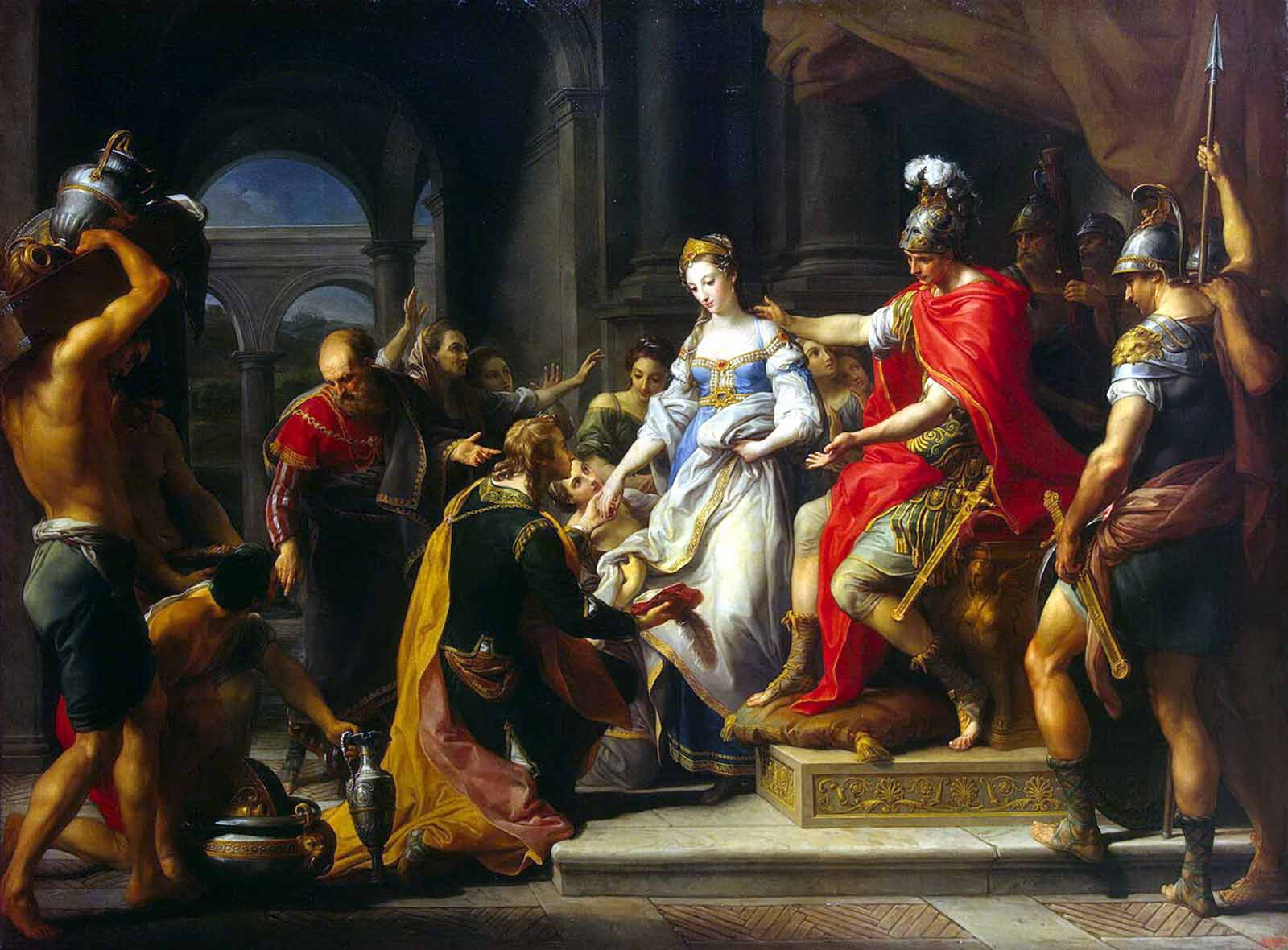
The Continence of Scipio, Pompeo Batoni, c.1771.

The Continence of Scipio, or The Clemency of Scipio, is an episode in the life of the Roman general Scipio Africanus, recounted by the historian Livy. During Scipio's campaign in Spain during the Second Punic War, he refused to accept a ransom for a young female prisoner, returning her to her fiancé Allucius, who in return became a supporter of Rome. Scipio's magnanimous treatment of a prisoner was regarded as an exemplar of mercy during warfare in classical times. Interest in the story revived in the Renaissance and the episode became a popular topic for literary works, visual arts, and operas.

== The classical story ==
The oldest surviving appearance of the story is in book 26 of Ab urbe condita by the Roman historian Titus Livius (Livy). The events related in Livy's account were followed by all later writers, although it is recorded that the earlier lost work by historian Valerius Antias took a different view on the episode.

Livy describes the siege of the Carthaginian colony of Qart-Hadast in Iberia (modern Cartagena, Spain) in 209 BC, by Roman forces commanded by Publius Cornelius Scipio (who would later become known as Scipio Africanus). The Celtiberian prince Allucius, an ally of Carthage, had earlier been betrothed to a beautiful virgin woman (who Livy does not name). The woman was taken prisoner during the siege. Scipio had a reputation for womanizing, so the troops brought the woman to him. The usual treatment of attractive female prisoners at this time was rape, taking her as a concubine, selling her into slavery, and/or demanding a ransom from her family to avoid those fates. When Scipio was informed of her betrothal, he summoned the woman's parents and fiancé, who arrived with treasure that they offered as a ransom. Scipio refused to accept the ransom, instead offering to return the prisoner to Allucius if he became a friend to Rome. The family then offered the treasure as a present; Scipio accepted this, but immediately returned the treasure as a wedding gift from himself. In gratitude, Allucius allied himself with Rome, bringing his tribe's forces to support the Roman armies.

== Early modern treatments ==
=== Literature and opera ===
Beginning in the Renaissance, the story became a popular motif for exemplary literature, growing to a peak of popularity during the 17th and 18th centuries.

In 1567, Carolus Clusius translated the Latin biography of Scipio in Plutarch’s Lives. Plutarch did not mention the episode, so Clusius prominently inserted his own description of it, based on Livy, into the translation.

Other dramatic treatments of the story include the Scipion of Jean Desmarets (1638), which was adapted into Dutch by Jan Lemmers as Schipio in Karthago (1649) and also performed later as Schipio en Olinde. In England a verse drama on the episode, Scipio Africanus was produced by a schoolboy, Charles Beckingham; it was acted in theatres and later printed in 1718.

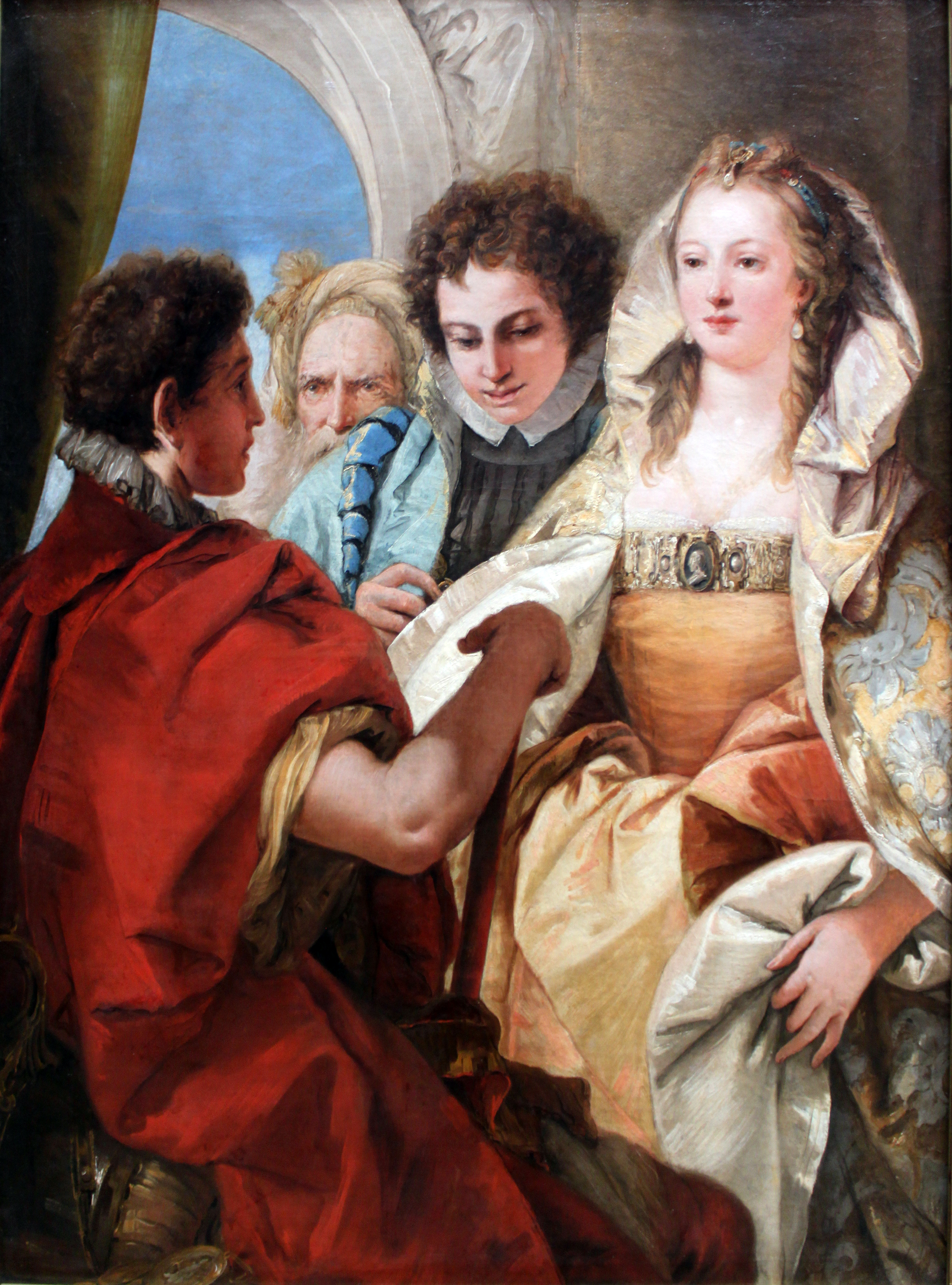
The Clemency of Scipio by Giovanni Domenico Tiepolo (1751), Städel.

Operatic treatments were numerous, with several composers setting music to the same libretto. Nicolo Minato's Scipione Africano was set to music, or served as the basis for adaptations, by Francesco Cavalli (1662); Carlo Ambrogio Lonati (1692); Francesco Bianchi (1787); and Gioacchino Albertini (1789). Johann Sigismund Kusser produced a German version, Der großmütige Scipio Africanus (1694). Giovanni Battista Boccabadati's prose drama Scipione (1693) served as the basis for Apostolo Zeno's Scipione nelle Spagne, which was performed in 1710, with music possibly by Antonio Caldara. Baccabadati's text was also set to music by Alessandro Scarlatti (1714), Tomaso Albinoni (1724), George Friederic Handel (1726), Carlo Arrigoni (1739), and Leonardo Leo (1740). Johann Christian Bach's La Clemenza di Scipione (1778) was also based upon it.

=== Visual arts ===
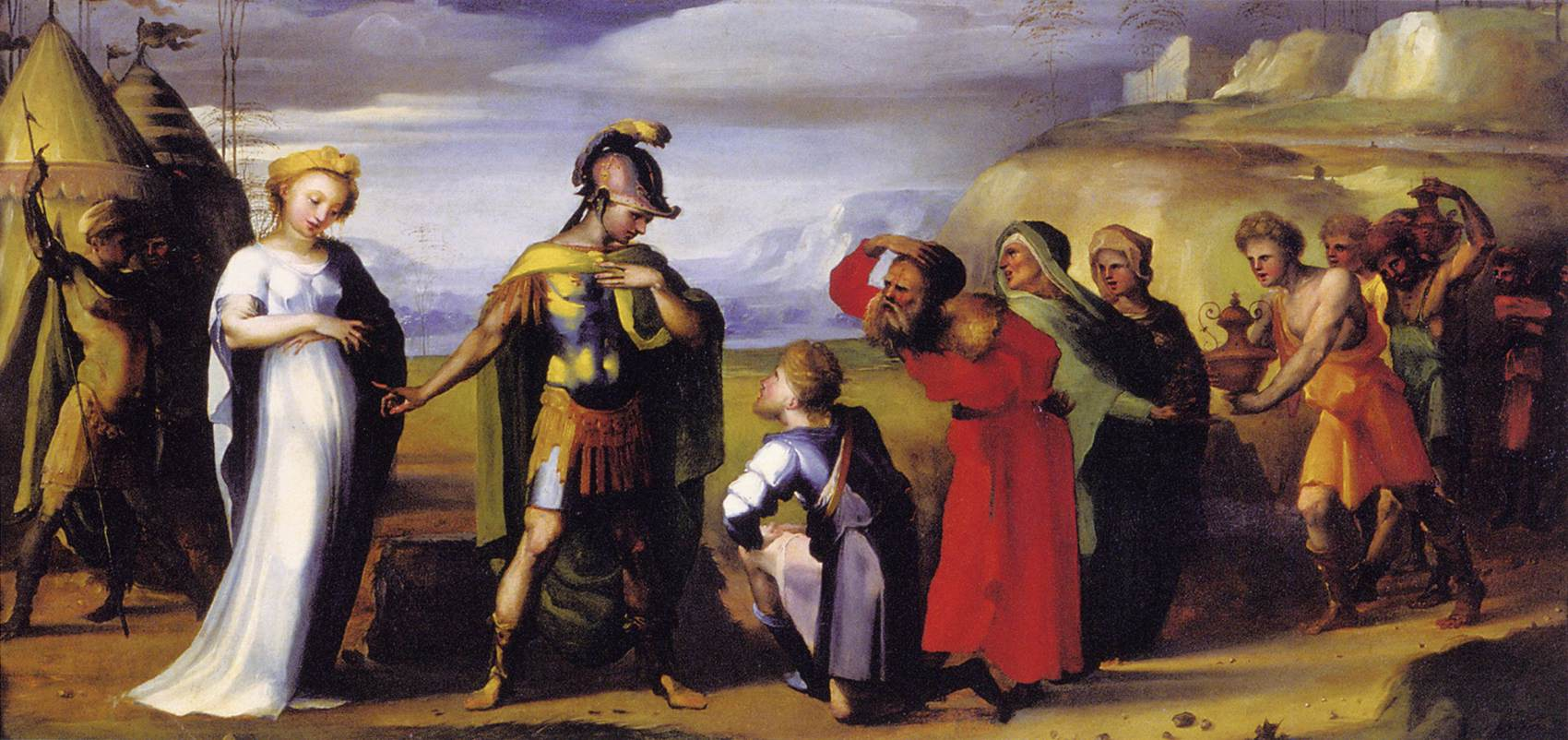
Domenico Beccafumi

There were numerous artistic depictions of the mercy and sexual restraint of Scipio although, as with the operas, they go now by a variety of titles. "The Continence of Scipio" is most common in English, although "The Clemency of Scipio" is also found. In other languages the terms magnanimity (großmütigheit) and generosity are alternatives. There is also sometimes a difficulty in identifying which scene is intended. The most common alternative example of military clemency descending from classical times was Alexander the Great's generous treatment of the family of the defeated Persian King Darius, best known from Veronese's painting in London. The scene of a victorious general seated at the centre of the composition with kneeling figures before him might portray either story without other clues to its interpretation.

Typically, Scipio sits on a throne on a raised dias, stretching out an arm in the direction of the Spanish party, with their treasure laid out in front of them. The "continence" shown by Scipio is both sexual and financial. The story of Timoclea and Alexander the Great is rather different, but produces similar compositions of a woman brought before a magnanimous classical commander, which sometimes accompanied the Continence in a series, and is also capable of being confused with it. Bernard de Montfaucon paired the two stories as his "Examples of the clemency and continence of conquerors" in a book of 1724.

Tapestry series based on the exploits of Scipio, which would often portray this scene, was one contextual identifier; so was connection with the histories of Livy or the expanded Plutarch for which the numerous surviving prints were intended, or on which they were dependent. Another context was the work's association with marriage, since the wedding between Allucius and his bride followed immediately on her restoration to him. Apollonio di Giovanni di Tommaso's episodic depiction appeared as a painted panel on a 15th-century marriage chest.

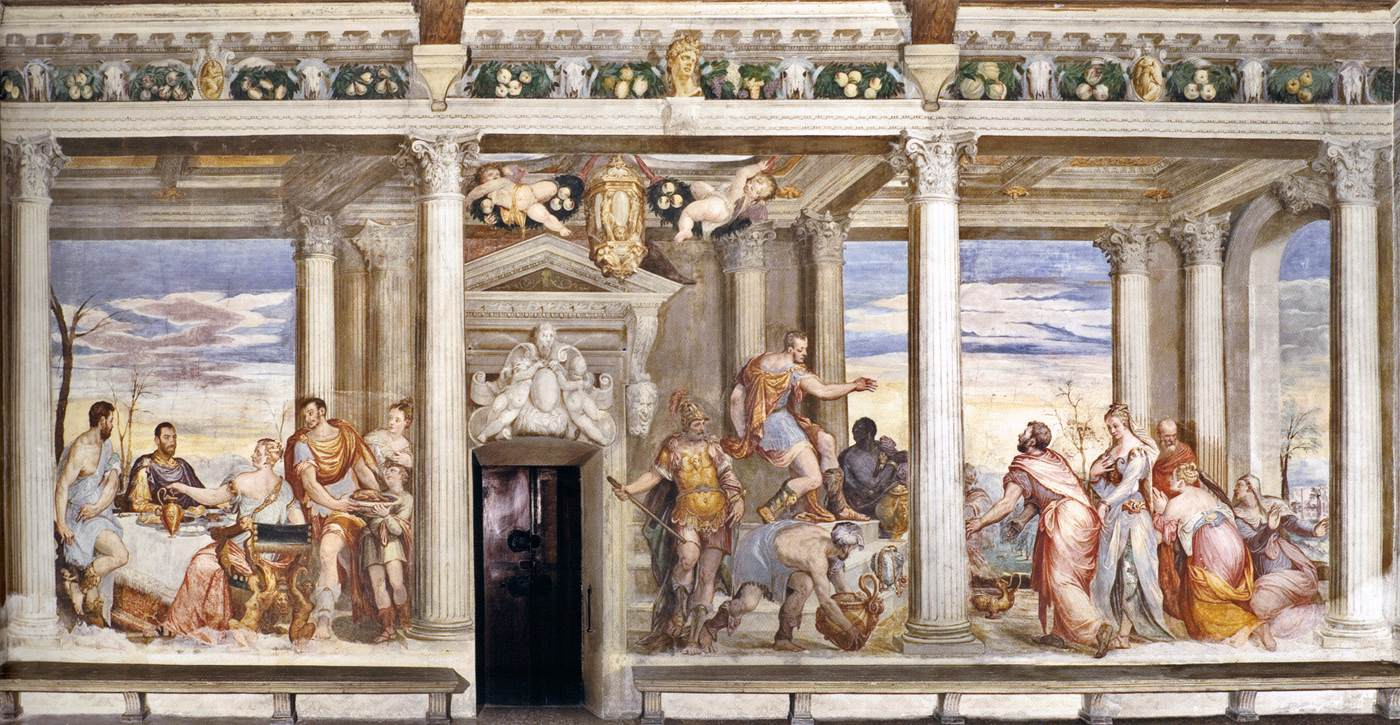
Giovanni Antonio Fasolo's 16th century fresco is to the right of the door at the Castello Porto Colleoni Thiene.

Pietro da Cortona’s mural in the Palazzo Pitti was intended for the marriage of Ferdinando II de' Medici, Grand Duke of Tuscany in 1637. In the case of the 1621 painting of the scene by Anthony van Dyck, which features prominently George Villiers, 1st Duke of Buckingham, together with his future bride, the artist's patron was also the sponsor of the marriage. Several other paintings from this time may have similar histories. The connection also extends to literary works, since it is known that Boccabadati's 1693 drama Scipione was written for performance during the celebration of the marriage between Francesco II d'Este, Duke of Modena and Margherita Maria Farnese.

Many paintings of Scipio's act of clemency were produced in Europe - over a hundred by Low Countries artists alone. Some artists made a speciality of the subject, returning to it more than once. Frans Francken the Younger painted eight versions, Sebastiano Ricci six versions, Simon de Vos and Gerbrand van den Eeckhout four each. Joseph-Marie Vien painted two versions, as did Peter Paul Rubens. In the case of the latter, both paintings were subsequently destroyed. Beside the historical record, a sketch of the 1620 version remains, as does a copy now in Lacock Abbey. There are also 16th century frescos by Gian Battista Zelotti at the Villa Emo, Fanzolo; the Villa Caldogno-Nordera, Caldogna; and elsewhere in Italy.

== Paintings ==
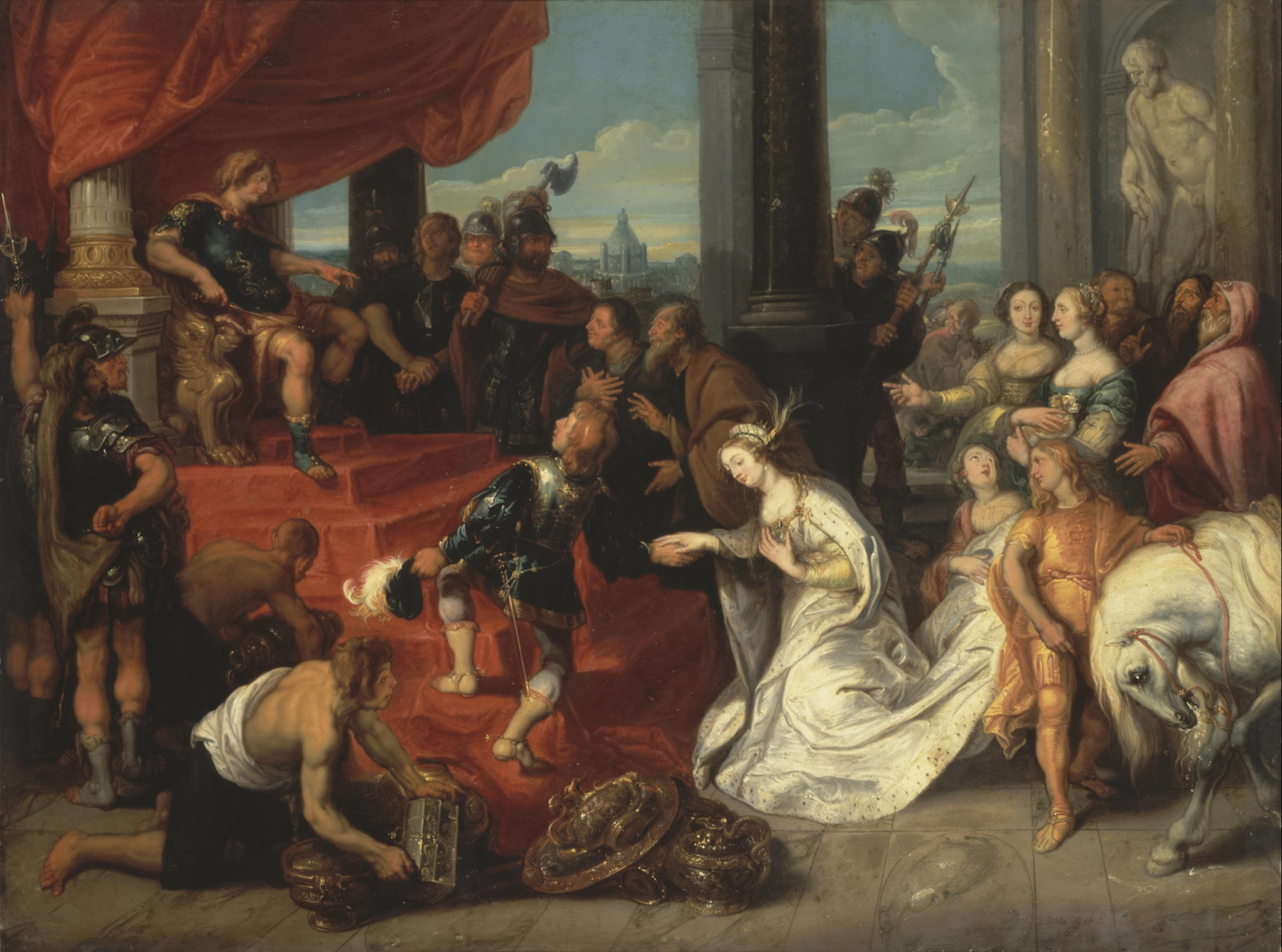
Simon de Vos

Below are listed some paintings of the subject in museum collections:

- The Continence of Scipio, Giovanni Bellini (after 1506), National Gallery of Art
- The Continence of Scipio Africanus, Domenico Beccafumi (c.1525), Palazzo Manzi, Lucca
- The Continence of Scipio, Lambert Lombard (1547), Musée des Beaux-Arts, Rennes
- The Continence of Scipio, Nicolò dell'Abbate (1555), Louvre
- The Continence of Scipio, Giulio Licinio (after 1566), National Gallery, London
- The Continence of Scipio, Karel van Mander (painting on copper, possibly used on a cabinet door, 1600), Rijksmuseum, Amsterdam
- The Continence of Scipio, Anthony van Dyck (1621), Christ Church, Oxford
- The Continence of Scipio, Jan Steen (1629), Cummer Museum of Art and Gardens
- The Continence of Scipio, Nicolas Poussin (1640), The Pushkin State Museum of Fine Arts, Moscow
- The Continence of Scipio, Gerbrand van den Eeckhout (ca. 1653), Rijksmuseum, (ca. 1669), Toledo Museum of Art
- The Clemency of Scipio, Giulio Romano (1688), Louvre
- The Continence of Scipio, Sebastiano Ricci (c.1700-04), Galleria Nazionale di Parma
- The Continence of Scipio, Giovanni Antonio Pellegrini (c.1708-13), The Cleveland Museum of Art
- The Continence of Scipio, François Lemoyne (1726), Museum of Fine Arts of Nancy
- The Clemency of Scipio, Michele Rocca (1720), Louvre
- The Continence of Scipio, Giambattista Pittoni (1733), Louvre
- The Continence of Scipio, Pietro Francesco Guala (1750), Musée départemental de l'Oise, Beauvais
- The Clemency of Scipio, Giovanni Domenico Tiepolo (1751), Städel
- The Continence of Scipio, Benjamin West (1766), Fitzwilliam Museum
- The Continence of Scipio, Pompeo Batoni (1771 or 1772), Hermitage Museum
- The Continence of Scipio, David Allan, 1774, National Gallery of Scotland
- The Continence of Scipio, Jean-Germain Drouais (1784), Musée des Beaux-Arts, Rennes
- The Continence of Scipio, Joshua Reynolds (1789), Hermitage Museum
- The Continence of Scipio, Paul Chenavard (1848), Museum of Fine Arts of Lyon
