= Qart Hadasht =

Qart Hadasht or Qart-ḥadašt means "New City" in Phoenician and may refer to:

- Ancient Carthage, the name given to the city by the Phoenicians
- Qart-Hadast (Spain), the original name of the city of New Carthage or today's Cartagena
