= Qart-Hadast (Spain) =

Ancient Carthaginian city in Spain

Qart Hadasht
- 𐤒𐤓𐤕 𐤇𐤃𐤔𐤕 (Phoenician)
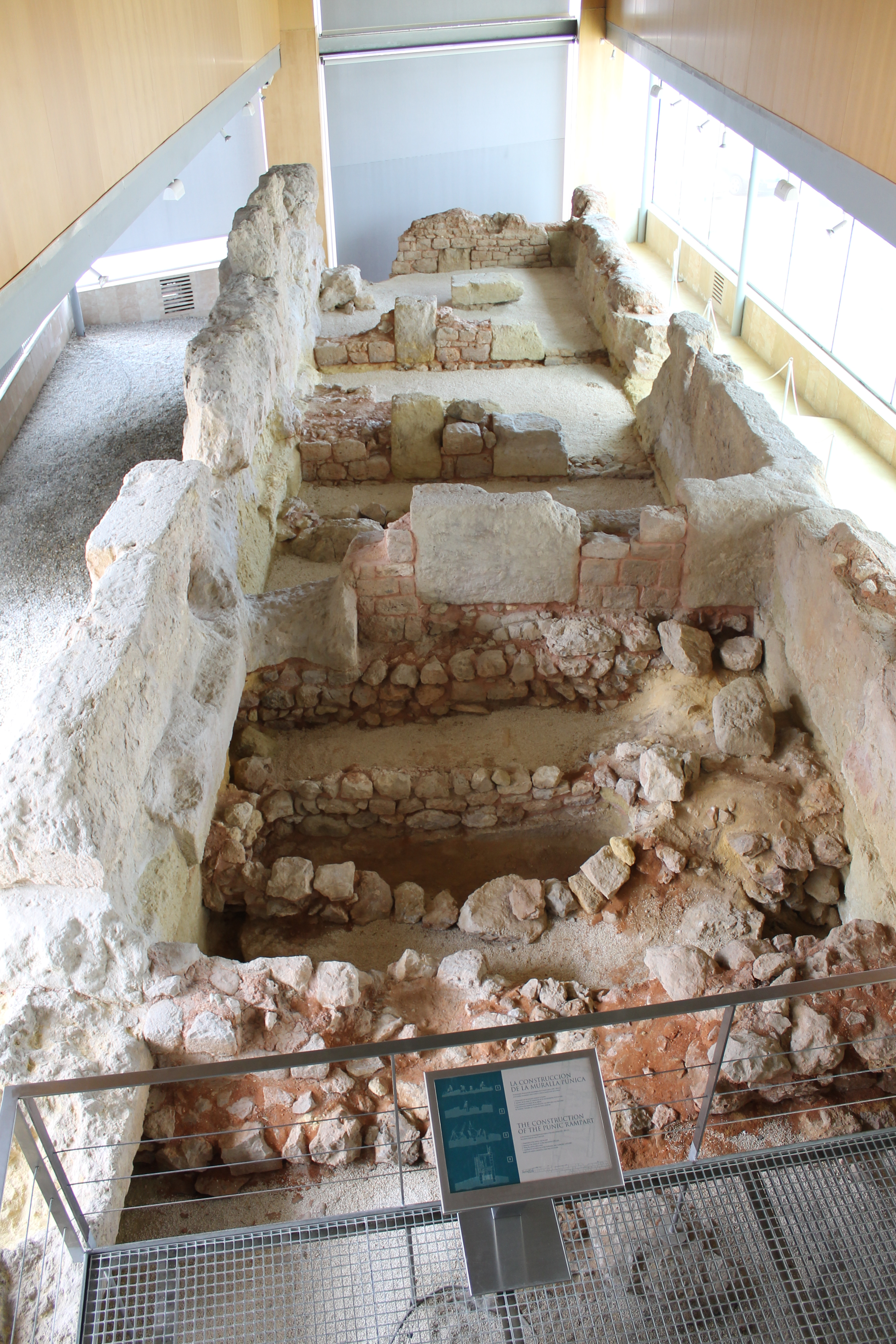
- Remains of the Punic wall of Qart Hadasht.
- Interactive map of Qart Hadasht
- Cultures: Punic
- Associated with: Carthaginians
- Location: Cartagena, Spain
- Region: Hispania Punica

History
- Built: 227 BC
- Built by: Hasdrubal the Fair
- Abandoned: 209 BC

Qart Hadasht (Phoenician: 𐤒𐤓𐤕 𐤇𐤃𐤔𐤕, romanized: qart hadašt, lit. 'New City') was an ancient Punic city-state located where modern-day Cartagena (Spain) now stands. It bore this name from its foundation by the Carthaginians in 227 BC until its Roman conquest in 209 BC during the Second Punic War, after which it was renamed Carthago Nova.

== History ==
=== Foundation ===
According to classical sources, the city of Cartagena was founded by the Carthaginian general Hasdrubal the Fair in 227 BC.

"After Abdera comes New Carthage, founded by Hasdrubal, successor of Hamilcar Barca, father of Hannibal. It is the most powerful city in the area; it enjoys a strong natural position and beautifully constructed walls. It has several harbors, a lagoon, and silver mines..." — Strabo, Geography 3, 4.6.

Some classical sources also mention the city of Mastia as early as the 6th century BC, associated with the Tartessian culture, and traditionally identified with Cartagena. This has led historians to believe that Hasdrubal did not establish the city on vacant land but rather rebuilt and fortified an existing settlement, turning it into the capital of Carthaginian Iberia.

Some scholars argue that 18 years of Carthaginian presence were insufficient to build an entire city, a port, shipyards, and fortifications from scratch, suggesting that Qart Hadasht was established on an already walled settlement.

=== Second Punic War ===
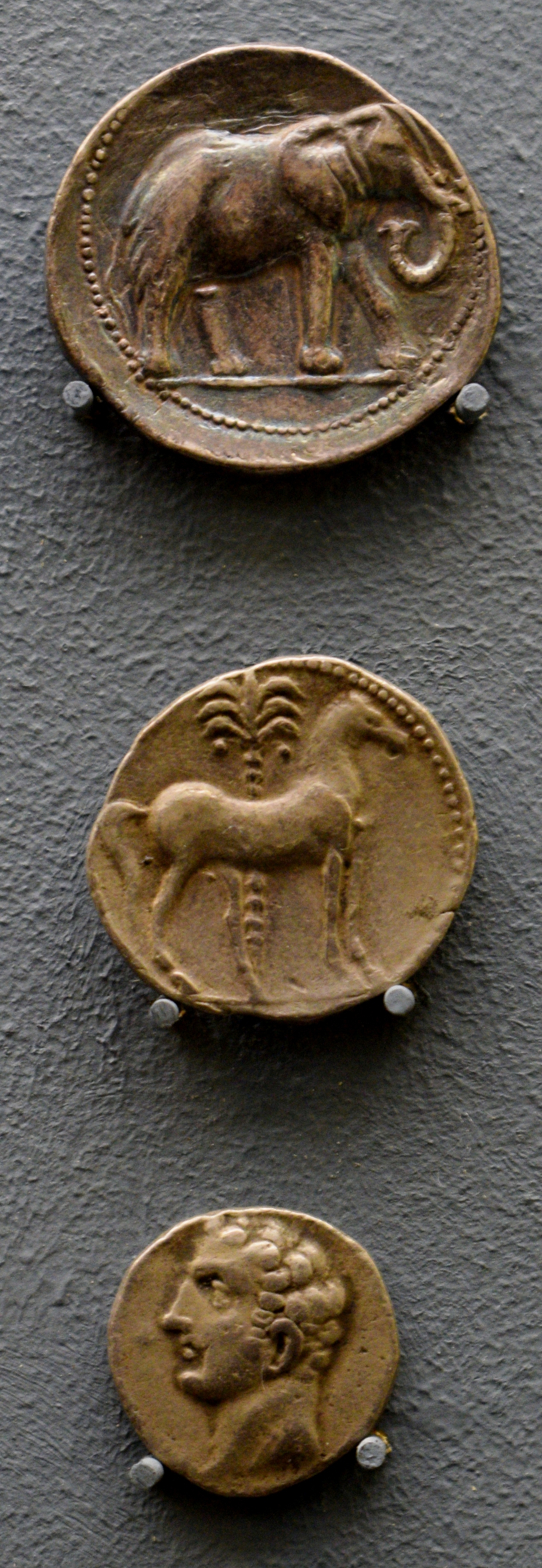
Carthaginian silver coins, one possibly bearing the image of Hamilcar Barca, minted in Cartagena. Collection of the Albacete Museum.

Qart Hadasht became Carthage's main base of operations in Iberia and its primary source of silver, extracted from the mines of Cartagena, to finance the Carthaginian army during the Second Punic War.

"With the silver from the Cartagena mines, they paid their mercenaries, and when, in 209 BC, Carthage lost these riches due to the capture of the city, Hannibal was no longer able to resist the Romans, making the fall of Cartagena a decisive moment in the war." — Schulten, Fontes Hispaniae Antiquae.

Hannibal departed from Qart Hadasht with his elephants on his famous expedition to Italy, crossing the Alps at the beginning of the Second Punic War in 218 BC.

Meanwhile, Rome sent the general Publius Cornelius Scipio, who besieged the city by land and sea. After a fierce battle, he successfully took the city. The fall of Qart Hadasht marked a crucial step in ending Carthaginian rule in southern Iberia.

== Archaeology ==
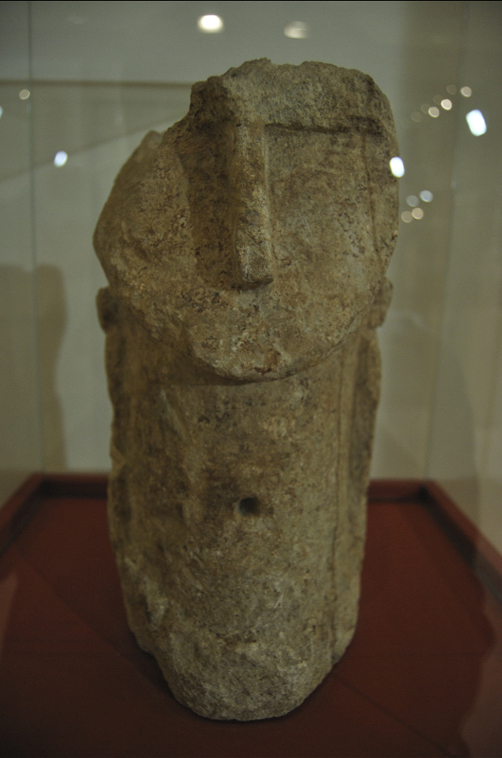
3rd century BC ex-voto shaped as a censer. Municipal Archaeological Museum of Cartagena.

=== El Molinete ===
During Carthaginian rule, Polybius describes El Molinete hill (later called Arx Asdrubalis by the Romans) as the city's acropolis, housing the palace of Hasdrubal the Fair.

Excavations in the late 20th century revealed many Roman-era remains, beneath which was found a 2-meter-high structure made of terracotta bricks, believed to be a temple from the Punic period. A large number of clay bowls used for libation rituals were discovered, indicating fire-related ceremonies.

=== Punic Wall ===
The Punic Wall of Cartagena preserves a section of the ancient double-layered sandstone fortifications, extending between San José hill and Monte Sacro. During excavations, evidence of fire damage was found, likely linked to the Roman conquest of the city.

=== Residences ===
In 1986, a Punic residential site was discovered on Serreta Street, with adobe walls and stone foundations showing signs of destruction, attributed to the Roman assault in 209 BC.

== Cultural depictions ==
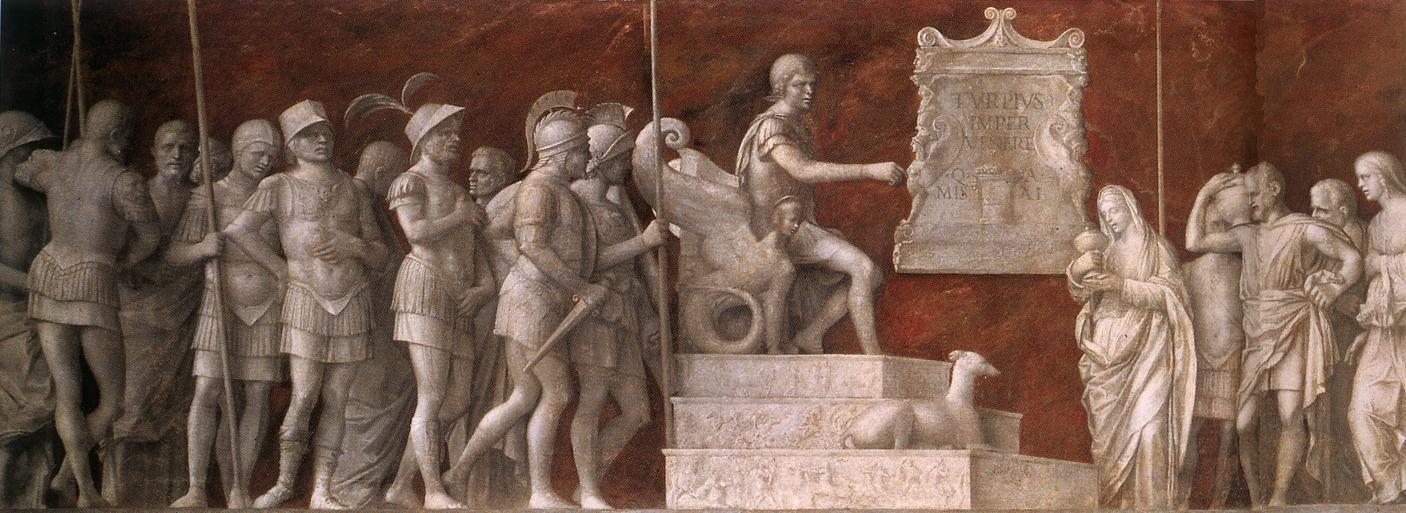
The Continence of Scipio, by Giovanni Bellini.

Qart Hadasht has been depicted in literature and media, particularly due to its role in the Punic Wars. Roman literature highlighted the legendary episode of The Clemency of Scipio, in which Scipio Africanus spared a beautiful Iberian maiden taken as war spoils, granting her to her fiancé, the Celtiberian prince Alucio.

Modern historical fiction includes Africanus: Son of the Consul by Santiago Posteguillo and Pride of Carthage by David Anthony Durham.
