= The Introduction of the Cult of Cybele at Rome =

Painting

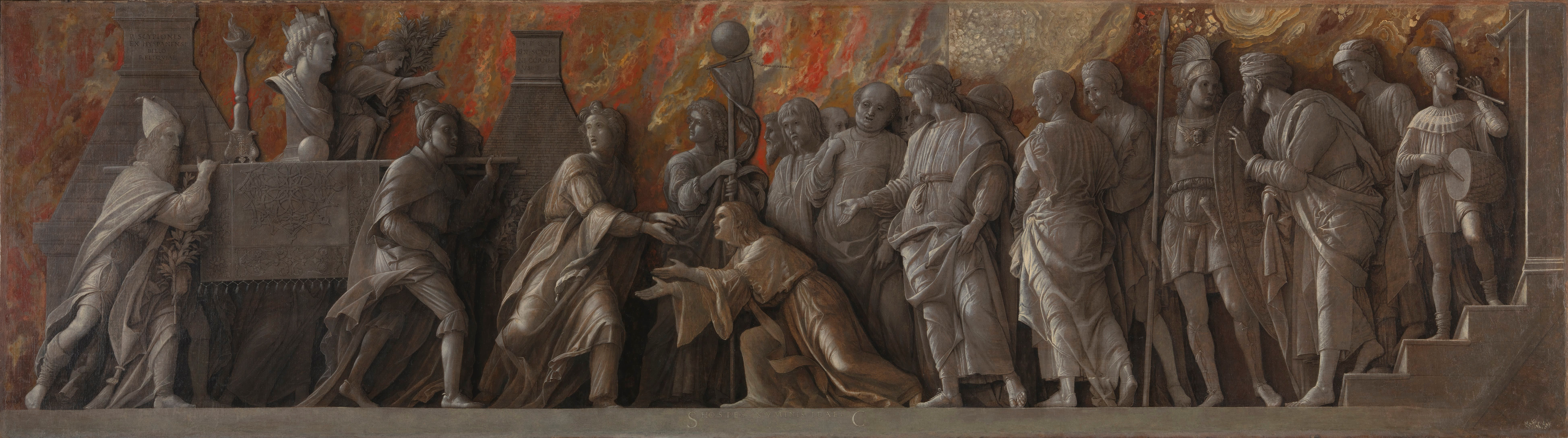
- Artist: Andrea Mantegna
- Year: 1505–1506
- Medium: Glue tempera on canvas
- Dimensions: 73.5 cm × 268 cm (28.9 in × 106 in)
- Location: National Gallery, London

The Introduction of the Cult of Cybele at Rome is a painting in glue tempera on canvas by Andrea Mantegna. Measuring 73.5 cm by 268 cm, It was produced in 1505–1506 and is now in the National Gallery in London. Like much of Mantegna's output after 1495 it is in monochrome, linked to contemporary sculpture and also part of the trend for illusion and trompe-l'œil favoured by the Mantuan court and especially by Isabella d'Este.

== History ==
It was commissioned in 1505 by Cardinal Marco Cornaro for the study of his brother Francesco, a patrician of Venice. The Cornaro family was said to be descended from the Cornelia gens of ancient Rome; the same cardinal signed himself "Marcus Cardinalis Cornelius" in a letter asking Francesco II Gonzaga for a work from Mantegna, who was the latter's court painter at the time.

The chosen subject was from the history of the Cornelii, specifically the arrival of the goddess Cybele's image in Rome during the Second Punic War, as told in Ovid, Appian and Livy. Scipio Africanus had consulted the Sibylline Books and ordered that the image be brought from Mount Ida. The Delphic Oracle requested that the most worthy Roman be sent to collect it and so the senate had chosen Africanus's cousin Scipio Nasica for the role. The ship carrying the image back got stuck in the shallows of the River Tiber, but the Vestal Virgin Claudia Quinta proved her virginity by helping to free it.

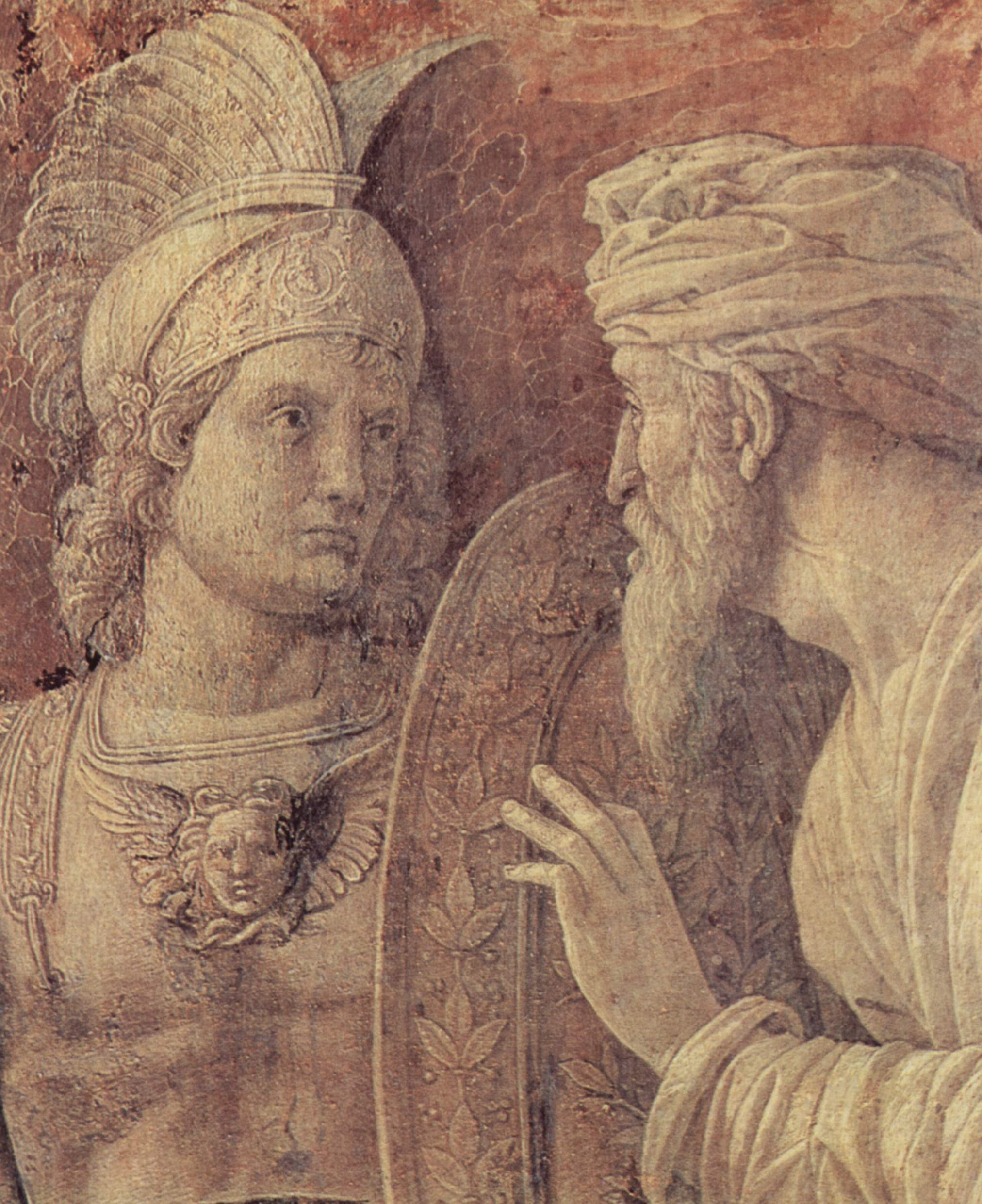
Detail

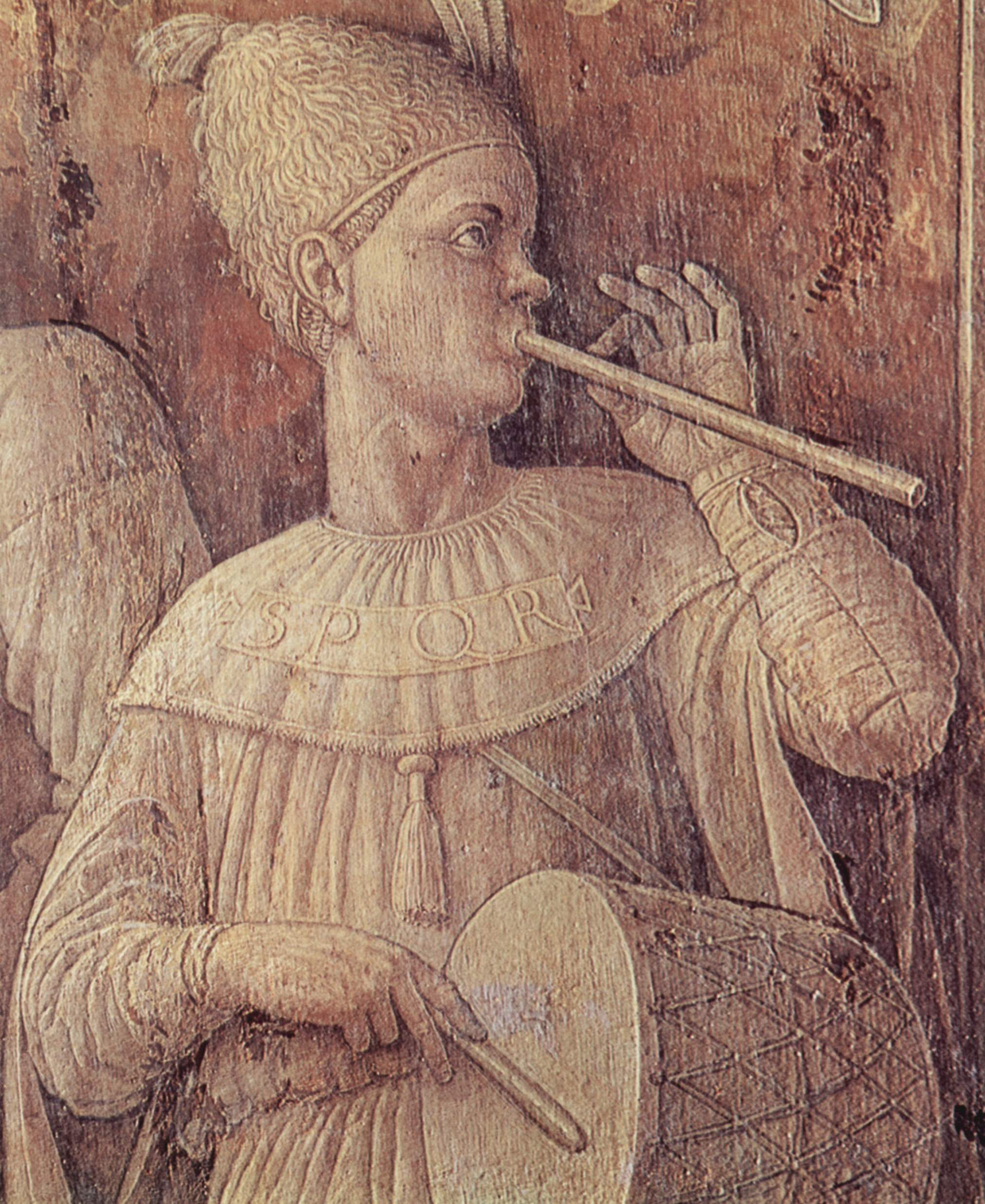
The shepherd

Mantegna showed a scene after the image had been brought ashore, just as it arrives at the temple built in Rome for it. He based it on ancient Roman sarcophagi, then starting to be rediscovered and entering collections such as that of the Gonzaga in Mantua. He painted the scene as if it were carved into a piece of marble with two differently mottled layers, one forming the scene and the other the background. Two pyramid tombs to the left bear the names of Nasica's father Gnaeus Cornelius Scipio Calvus and Africanus's father Publius Cornelius Scipio, both brothers.

The two bearers in front of the image are turbaned like Moors, and the bearded pair at the back wear tiara-like hats. One of the two rear bearers also holds a laurel branch, as used in a Roman triumph, as does a young slave crouching in front of the bust. The bust wears a corona turrita and stands on a sphere on a precious carpet, with the sphere representing universality. Behind it is a ritual torch, whilst Nasica is shown as a young man kneeling before the bust; his words welcoming it are shown on the lower border. Behind him is another senator, probably Africanus, who is speaking to another man, possibly his fellow-consul Publius Licinius Crassus Dives. The furthest right figure is a shepherd, wearing a Phrygian cap, playing a flute and drum and standing on the steps of the temple to which the image is being brought; a trumpet protrudes from the temple doors.

Giovanni Bellini's Continence of Scipio (National Gallery of Art, Washington) was painted as a pendant for it, but two other intended paintings were never produced. Garavaglia cites a spoken assertion by Roberto Longhi that the painting could have been accompanied by the two smaller monochrome works Sophonisba and Tuccia. They are certainly the same height as The Introduction, but they are on panel not canvas and no documents support the theory.

Pietro Bembo wrote a letter to Isabella Gonzaga in 1505, referring to arguments about payment between the commissioner and the painter, which meant it was still mentioned in the inventory of Mantegna's studio contents after his death in 1506, which refers to it as "principiata" (i.e., begun but incomplete). It was completed by Mantegna's son Francesco, by Bellini or another painter. Like other works in Mantegna's studio upon his death, it was acquired by Cardinal Sigismondo Gonzaga, who in 1507 finally delivered it to Francesco Cornaro.
