= Punic wall of Cartagena =

Coordinates: 37°36′15″N 0°58′43″W

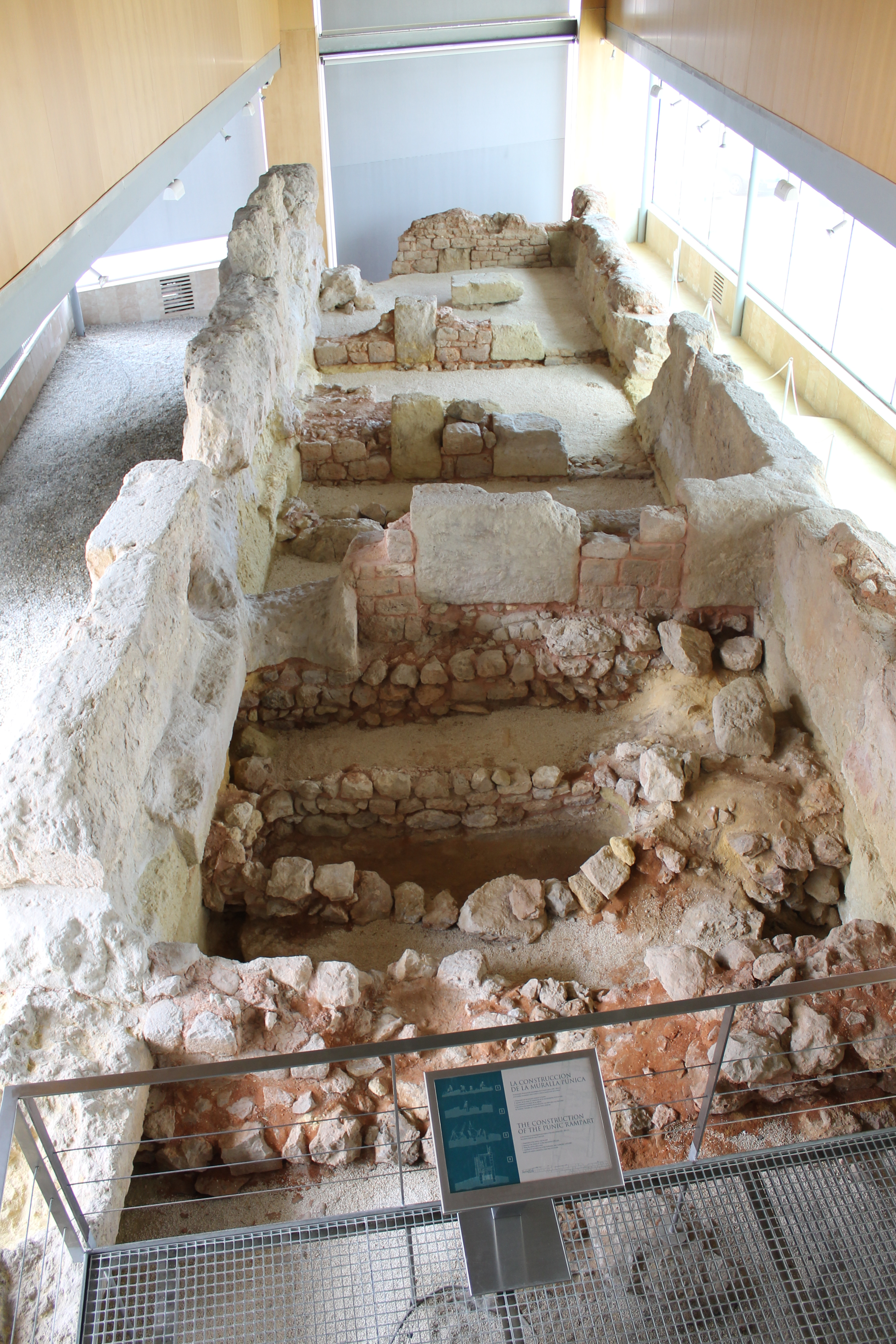
- Interactive map of Punic wall of Cartagena

The Punic wall of Cartagena (Spanish: Muralla púnica de Cartagena) is an archaeological site from the 3rd century BC in which can be seen the first defensive wall of Cartagena, built by the Carthaginians.

This is an important site because it is one of the few remains of Carthaginian civilization in Spain, and the walls bear witness to the Battle of New Carthage during the Second Punic War.

== History ==
In 227 BC, the Carthaginian general Hasdrubal the Fair founded the city of Qart Hadasht, probably on an early Iberian settlement called Mastia. The new city was located on a peninsula in the middle of a bay and had five high hills, two of which were at the entrance of the isthmus, so it had a great position for the military defense.

In this context, during the brief period of Punic domain upon Cartagena (227-209 BC), the Carthaginians decided to fortify the Barcid capital in Iberia with a wall that surrounded the settlement. The presence of this fortification was crucial to prevent a Roman assault led by the brothers Gnaeus and Publius Cornelius Scipio in 216 BC, when the Second Punic War had broken.

However, with the arrival of General Scipio Africanus, the walls were able to contain the enemy only for a short time. The Romans besieged the place by land and sea, and taking advantage of their numerical superiority dodged the defenders stationed in the walls and conquered Qart Hadasht after a tough battle, signifying the beginning of the end of Carthaginian power in the south of the Iberian Peninsula.

== Architecture ==
The wall used Hellenistic models: is composed of a double parallel paramento of tabaire (sandstone from local quarries) which retains a height of three meters.

The ruins of the Punic walls that can be seen today belong to the lienzo of the section that extended to the entrance of the isthmus, between the hills of San José and Monte Sacro (in Antiquity called Aletes and Baal, respectively). During the archaeological excavations were found indications of a fire, possibly during the battle or the looting that followed.

Currently the wall can be visited thanks to the Interpretation Center of the Punic Wall, part of the touristic consortium Cartagena Puerto de Culturas. The building protects the site and recreates their original elevation with contemporary architecture.
