= The Continence of Scipio (Batoni) =

Painting by Pompeo Batoni

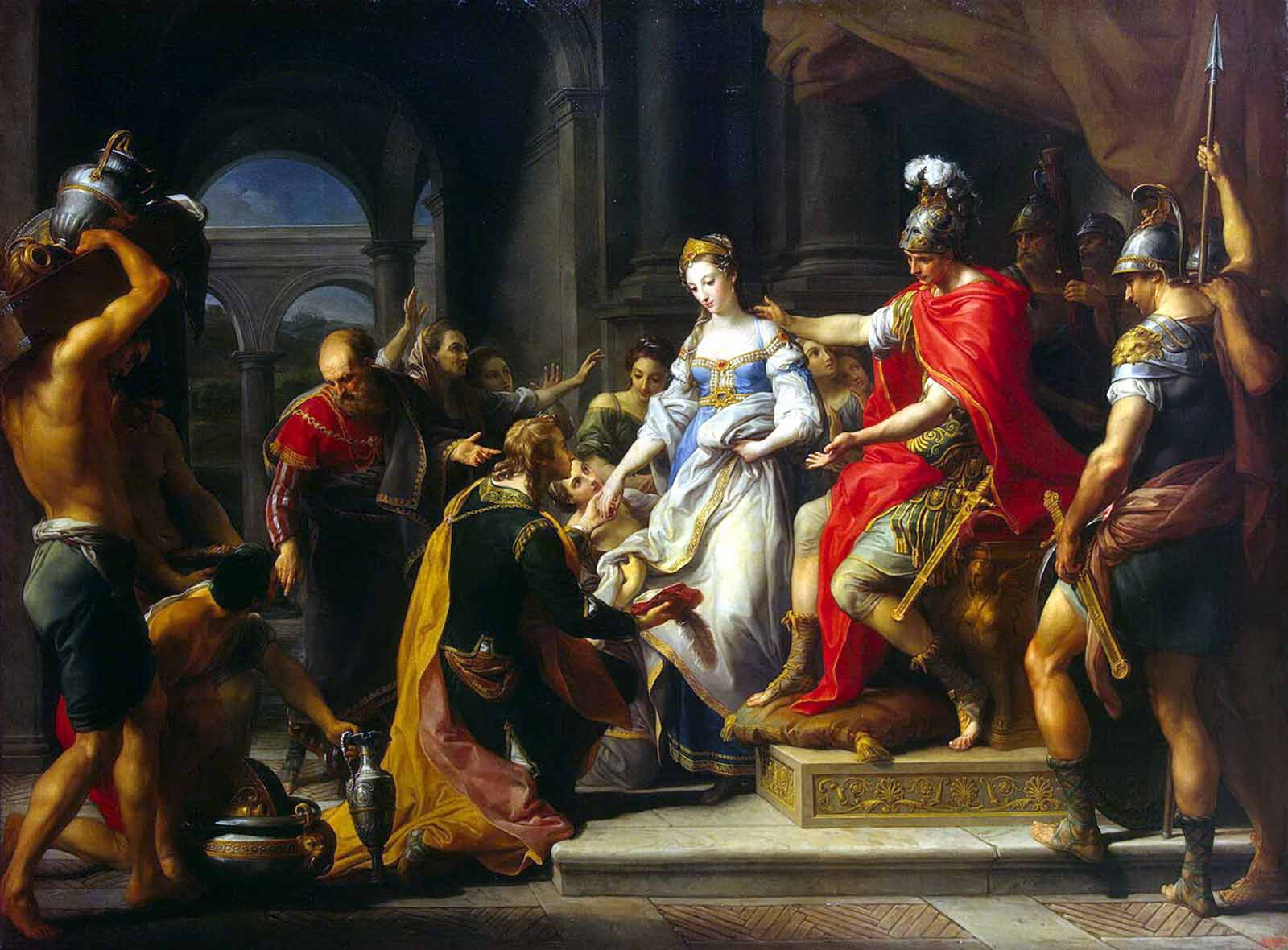
- Artist: Pompeo Batoni
- Year: 1771
- Type: Oil on canvas, history painting
- Dimensions: 226.5 cm × 297.5 cm (89.2 in × 117.1 in)
- Location: Hermitage Museum; Saint Petersburg

The Continence of Scipio is a 1771 history painting by the Italian artist Pompeo Batoni. It depicts a scene from the Siege of Carthage during the Second Punic War when Scipio Africanus, a general of the Roman Republic, refused to accept a ransom for an aristocratic female prisoner and released her to her fiancée. The story of Scipio's clemency is told by Livy and has been a popular subject for artists.

Although best-known for his portrait paintings of Grand Tourists, the Rome-based Batoni also produced scenes from religious and classical history. The style of the painting indicates his shift in his later career towards a more painterly form of classicism. The painting was commissioned by Count Shuvalov in 1768 on behalf of Catherine the Great for a sum of around 1,700 scudi. The Empress also commissioned a pendant Thetis Takes Achilles from the Centaur Chiron. Today both works are in the collection of the Hermitage Museum in Saint Petersburg.

== Bibliography ==
- Bowron, Edgar Peters & Kerber, Peter Björn. Pompeo Batoni: Prince of Painters in Eighteenth-century Rome. Yale University Press, 2007.
- Clark, Anthony M. Studies in Roman Eighteenth-century Painting. Decatur House Press, 1981.
- Milam, Jennifer D. Historical Dictionary of Rococo Art. Scarecrow Press, 2011.
