= Digitia gens =

Ancient Roman family

The gens Digitia was a plebeian family at ancient Rome. Members of this gens are first mentioned during the Second Punic War.

== Origin ==
The first of the Digitii was an Italian ally of Rome, who received the Roman franchise in recognition of great heroism during the taking of Carthago Nova in 210 BC. Münzer concluded that he had been part of the naval contingent from Poseidonia, subsequently the Roman colonia of Paestum, as the Digitii appear to have been a leading family there for generations, and inscriptions of the Digitii are known primarily from Rome and Paestum.

== Praenomina ==
The chief praenomina of the Digitii were Sextus, Decimus, and Lucius. Lucius was the most common praenomen used throughout Roman history, Sextus somewhat common, while Decimus was less widespread and more distinctive during the Republican period.

== Branches and cognomina ==
The Digitii do not appear to have been divided into distinct stirpes, but the cognomina Rufus, originally indicating someone with red hair, and its derivative form, Rufinus, appear in two families. Personal cognomina include Celadus, Praeses, Secundus, and Valens.

== Members ==
This list includes abbreviated praenomina. For an explanation of this practice, see filiation.

- Sextus Digitius, the first of the name to appear in history, was an Italian, who served as a marine (socius navalis) under Scipio Africanus. He and Quintus Trebellius claimed to have been the first to have scaled the walls of Carthago Nova in 209 BC. They were awarded the corona muralis for their bravery, and Digitius evidently received the Roman franchise.
- Sextus Digitius, probably the same person as the marine under Scipio Africanus, (Note: Based on the rarity of the nomen, Münzer makes the argument that all three men named Sextus Digitius are the same man.) was praetor in 194 BC, and received the province of Hispania Ulterior. He was appointed legate by Scipio Asiaticus to collect a fleet at Brundisium in 190, and was sent as ambassador to Macedonia in 174. The following year, he was sent to Apulia to purchase provisions for the fleet and the army.
- Sextus Digitius, military tribune in 170 BC, was probably the same man as the praetor of 194, or else his son. He served in Macedonia and Greece under the consul Aulus Hostilius Mancinus, and reported his defeats upon returning to Rome to perform a sacrifice.
- Decimus Digitius D. l. Eros, a freedman who along with Digitia Helpis, dedicated a sepulchre at Rome, dating from the late first century BC or early first century AD, for their patron, Decimus Digitius Rufus, along with his clients and freedmen.
- Digitia D. l. Helpis, a freedwoman who along with Decimus Digitius Eros, dedicated a sepulchre at Rome, dating from the late first century BC or early first century AD, for their patron, Decimus Digitius Rufus, along with his clients and freedmen.
- Decimus Digitius, the father of Decimus Digitius Rufus.
- Decimus Digitius D. f. Rufus, of the tribus Palatina, buried in a sepulchre at Rome, dating from the late first century BC or early first century AD, along with his clients and freedmen, including Lucius Atinius Primus, Aurelia Truphera, and Lucius Atinius Hilarus, dedicated by his freedmen Decimus Digitius Eros and Digitia Helpis.
- Digitia [...]abinia, buried in a first-century tomb at Rome, dedicated by one of her clients.
- Digitius, mentioned in an inscription from Paestum, dating from the first century, or the first half of the second.
- Lucius Digitius Artemidorus, along with Titus Flavius Marullus, dedicated a statue at Paestum, dating from the late first or the first half of the second century, in honor of Marcus Pomponius Diogenes, one of the municipal duumvirs.
- Digitius Lycoleo, buried in a second- or third-century tomb at Rome, dedicated by his client, Digitia Juliane, aged fifty years, two months, ten days.
- Digitia Juliane, dedicated a second- or third-century tome at Rome to her patron, Digitius Lycoleo.
- Lucius Digitius Bassus, one of the duumvirs at Paestum, and a flamen of the imperial cult, during the middle or late second century. Perhaps the same Lucius Digitius Bassus named among the Arval Brethren at Rome in an inscription dating from AD 145.
- Digitius Praeses, dedicated a monument at Paestum, dating between the middle of the second century and the early third, for his friend, Gaius Petronius Bassus.
- Lucius Digitius Valens, a soldier of the second cohort of the Praetorian Guard, and a native of Paestum. In AD 148, he received the right to marry while still in the Guard from the emperor Antoninus Pius.
- Digitius Pompeius, a member of the beam-makers' guild at Rome, mentioned in an inscription dating from the end of the second century.
- Digitia Bonosa, the wife of Apollonius Mucatra, a soldier in the fifth cohort of the Praetorian Guard, buried in a third-century tomb at Rome, aged forty-nine years, nine months, eleven days, and four hours, with a monument dedicated by Digitia, along with his clients, Apollonius Proculus and Eutychius.
- Digitia Gemella, dedicated a third-century tomb at Paestum for her husband, Marcus Nanneius Quietanus, aged fifty years, three months, ten days, and three hours.
- Digitia Prisca, dedicated a third-century tomb at Atina in Lucania for her husband, Flavius Hila, aged about seventy years, seven months, ten days.
- Lucius Digitius Rufinus, the father of Digitia Rufina.
- Digitia L. f. Rufina, the daughter of Lucius Digitius Rufinus. Known from an inscription in Paestum, dating from the first half of the third century, recording that she and her husband received money from the town's patron, the Roman eques Marcus Tullius Cicero Laurentius Lavinatas, due to her "extraordinary chastity, faith, and modesty."
- Lucius Digitius Celadus, mentioned in an inscription from Paestum, dating from AD 245.
- Digitius Antonius, one of the municipal duumvirs of Paestum in AD 347, dedicated an inscription in honor of the town's patron, Aquillius Nestorius.

=== Undated Digitii ===
- Digitia Marcellina, dedicated a tomb at Atina in Latium for her mother, Heria Mansueta.
- Decimus Digitius Pharnaces, buried at Rome, with an inscription dedicated by his daughter Digitia Primilla.
- Digitia Primilla, dedicated a monument at Rome to her father, Decimus Digitius Pharnaces.
- Digitia D. l. Secunda, a freedwoman, dedicated a tomb at Rome for Digitius Secundus.
- Digitius Secundus, buried at Rome, in a tomb dedicated by the freedwoman Digitia Secunda.
- Aurelia Digitia Sergia, an infant girl buried at Rome, aged four months, twenty-six days.

== See also ==
- List of Roman gentes

== Bibliography ==
- Titus Livius (Livy), History of Rome.
- Paulus Orosius, Historiarum Adversum Paganos (History Against the Pagans).
- Dictionary of Greek and Roman Biography and Mythology, William Smith, ed., Little, Brown and Company, Boston (1849).
- Corpus Inscriptionum Latinarum (The Body of Latin Inscriptions, abbreviated CIL), Theodor Mommsen et alii (eds.), Berlin-Brandenburgische Akademie der Wissenschaften (1853–present).
- L'Année épigraphique, René Cagnat et alii (eds.), Presses Universitaires de France (1888–present).
- Friedrich Münzer, Römische Adelsparteien und Adelsfamilien (Roman Aristocratic Parties and Families), Stuttgart, 1920.
- Mario Mello and Giuseppe Voza, Le iscrizioni latine di Paestum (The Latin Inscriptions of Paestum), Università degli Studi di Napoli, Naples (1968).
