= The Continence of Scipio (Pittoni) =

Painting by Giambattista Pittoni

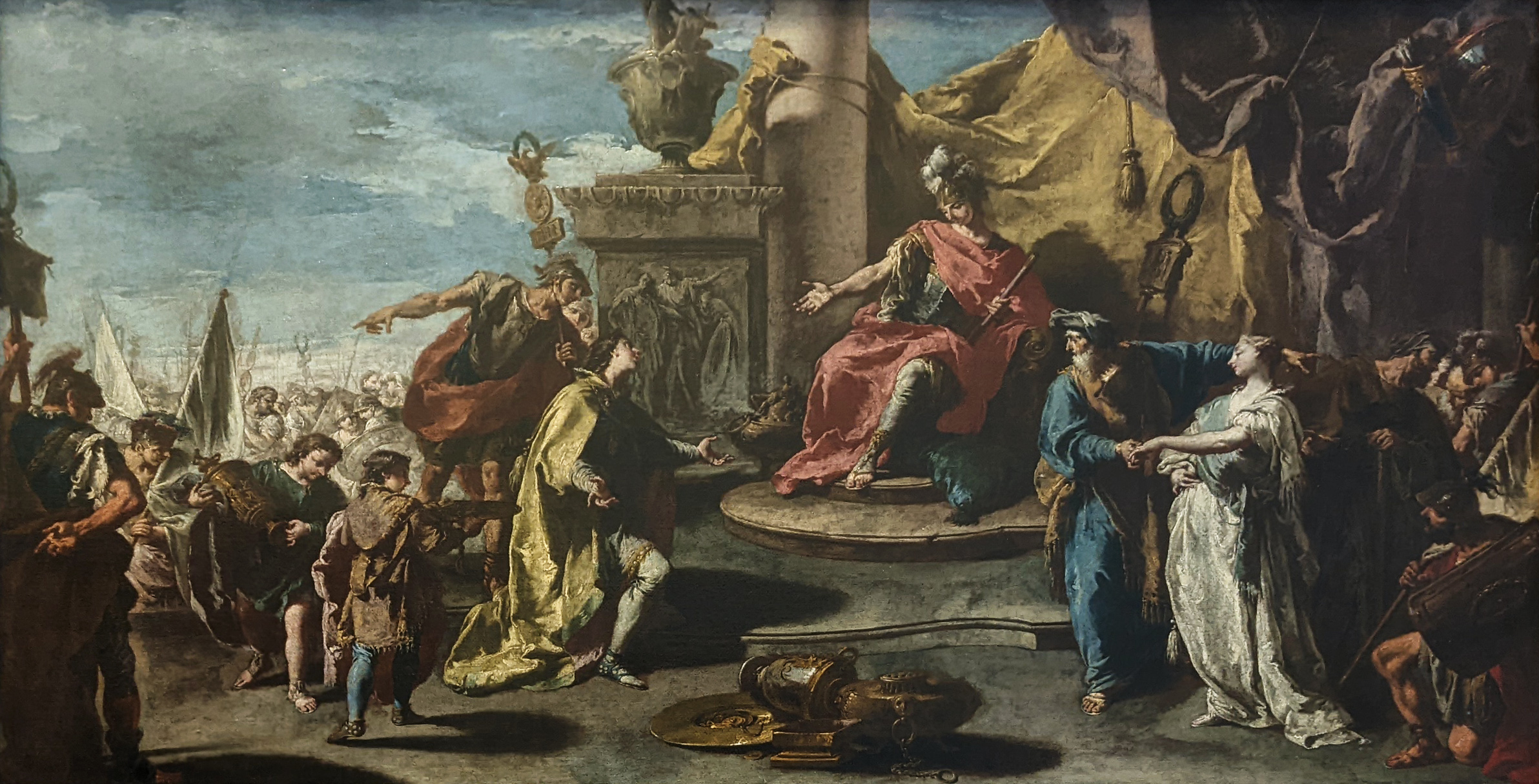
- Artist: Giovanni Battista Pittoni
- Year: c. 1732–1735
- Medium: Oil on canvas
- Dimensions: 65 cm × 96 cm (26 in × 38 in)
- Location: Louvre; Paris

The Continence of Scipio is an oil on canvas painting by the Italian artist Giambattista Pittoni, from c. 1732–1735. This painting is the counterpart of Polyxena in Front of the Tomb of Achilles, by the same artist, also exhibited at the Louvre, in Paris.

== History and description ==
The episode of the painting took place at 211 BC, after the conquest of Cartagena, in modern Spain, by the Romans during the Second Punic War. Scipio Africanus, the Roman leader, had received from his soldiers a young female prisoner of great beauty; but instead of keeping her against her will, as his forced lover, he decided to return her to her father and her fiancé. There are at least four versions of this subject by Pittoni and this is the oldest.

Scipio is depicted seated on a high throne, while he is showing his clemency to the young Allazio, who begs on his knees for his fiancée. On the other side, the young girl watches the scene and gives her hand to an old man. Several people and soldiers are all around the scene, and on the ground, several precious vases appear as spoils of the Roman victory. The characters are well spaced, while the light seems less dramatic than in the 17th century painting; the colors are clear and the motifs are depicted in a naturalistic manner. The ancient history episode is shown with the spirit of the 18th century. Pittori was trained as a draftsman, and he brings a real construction to his compositions, also giving great importance to chiaroscuro in the very constructed setting.
