= The Continence of Scipio (Poussin) =

Painting by Nicolas Poussin

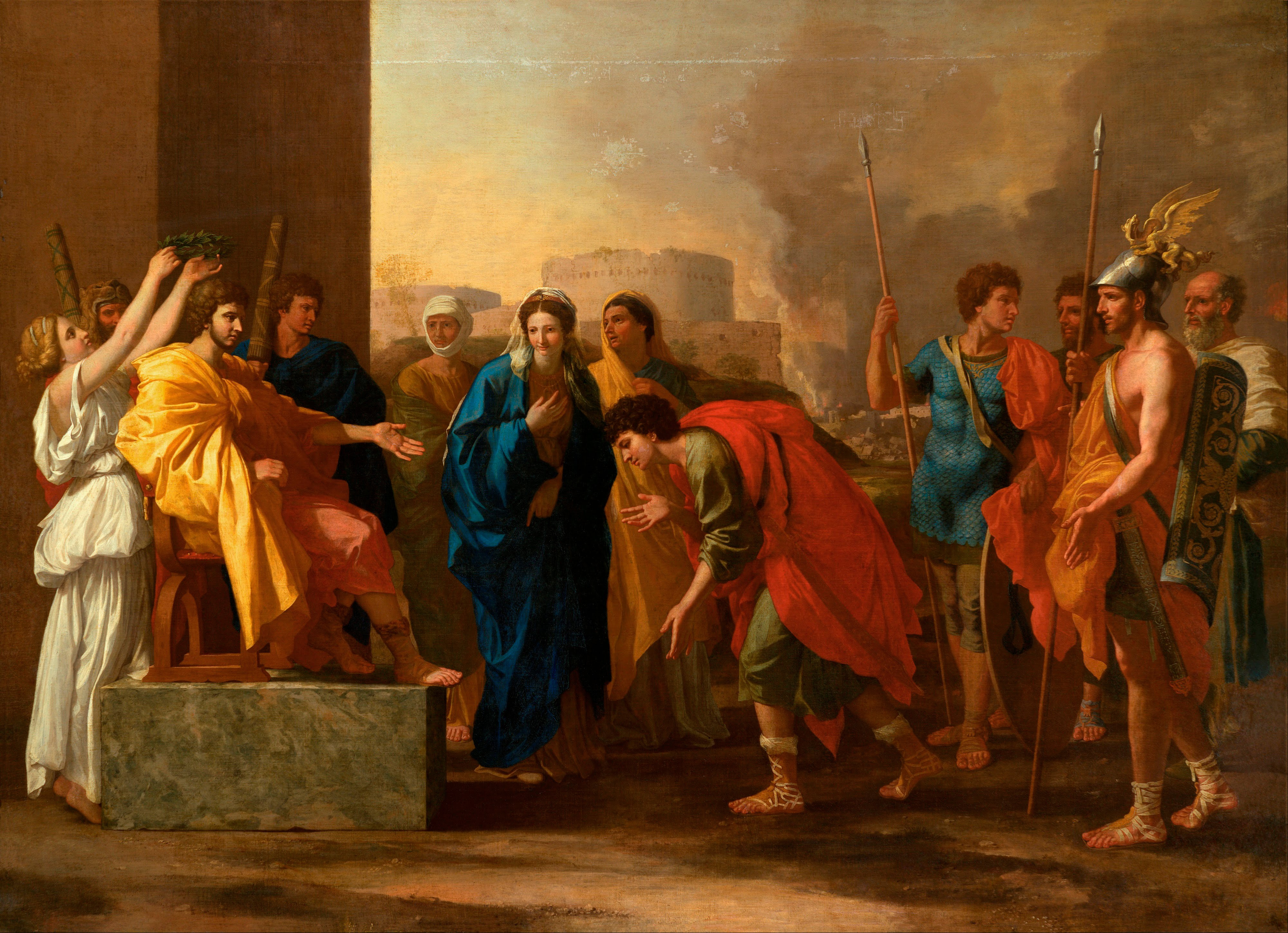
- Artist: Nicolas Poussin
- Year: 1640
- Medium: Oil on canvas
- Dimensions: 163.5 cm × 114.5 cm (64.4 in × 45.1 in)
- Location: Pushkin Museum; Moscow

The Continence of Scipio is an oil on canvas painting by Nicolas Poussin, from 1640. It is held in the Pushkin Museum, in Moscow.

== History ==
It was commissioned by Abbé Gian Maria Roscioli, secretary to Pope Urban VIII. It changed owners several times, reaching the Walpole collection in the first half of the 18th century, from which it was bought for the Hermitage Museum by Catherine the Great in 1779. It was reassigned to the Pushkin Museum in 1930, where it remains. The painting is based on the historical continence of Scipio.

== Description ==
This picture is composed twelve figures, representing the noble Roman, clad in a vesture and a red mantle, seated on an elevation at the side, extending his hand apparently addressing the young Carthaginian, who with his affianced bride is standing before him: the former is bowing, gratefully acknowledging his generosity and justice, and the latter is seen in a front view, with two young women suitably attired standing behind her: a fourth female, clothed in white, is behind the hero holding a chaplet over his head Two lictors with the fasces stand on his right and a group of four soldiers is on the opposite side.

== Copy ==
A picture of this subject differing materially from the composition of the preceding, and done en grisaille, was formerly in the Dusseldorf Gallery and is engraved in that collection.

== See also ==
- List of paintings by Nicolas Poussin
