= Aletes (deity) =

Deity worshiped in the Iberian Peninsula

The distribution of the hills in Cartagena in antiquity, including the hill of San José.

Aletes (Greek: Ἀλήτης), sometimes referred to as Aletos or Alidath, was an individual of disputed origin who lived in the southeast of the Iberian Peninsula in the times preceding the foundation of Qart Hadasht, Cartagena by the Carthaginian general Asdrubal the Fair in 227 BC, and whose discovery of silver mines in the vicinity of that city earned him a deification by his peers.

The only source about this person is a brief account by the Greek historian Polybius during the topographical description of Cartagena for volume X of his Histories, in which he cites Aletes as a local hero to whom, after the aforementioned deification, one of the foundational hills, which currently corresponds to the hill of San José, was consecrated.

The existence of a temple dedicated to him on that promontory is not certain in view of Polybius' laconism in this respect, but this has not prevented several authors from suggesting his possible presence crowning the sacred precinct.

== Historiographical debate ==
Contemporary historiography has found in the mining deity a motive for discussion, both about its ethnic origin and its possible non-historicity. Thus, in 1930 the German archaeologist and historian Adolf Schulten wanted to see in it an Etruscan influence on the peoples of Levante, in a theory that has not found academic support. The position of the Frenchman Stéphane Gsell, who in 1920 stated that in the case of Aletes it could be an Iberian name, and whose hypothesis was supported since the 1960s by Spanish historians thanks to the advances in the identification of the Iberian scripts, has obtained more support.

The last point of controversy came in 1982, when the German Michael Koch introduced the theory that Aletes did not exist as a real person, in a position generally contested by Hispanic historiography, headed by José María Blázquez Martínez. Within this historiography, Ignasi Garcés also states that the fact that the Carthaginians respected the Iberian nomenclature of the hill is an example of an attempt to integrate the indigenous stratum of the city into their new regime, which resulted in the strengthening of the political power of the Barcids in the region.

In 2015 an article was published on the influence of astronomy in the urban planning of Cartagena during Antiquity, in which a group of archaeologists and historians suggested that the monumentalisation programme undertaken in the Roman-imperial period may have been conditioned by the attempt to link the Emperor Augustus with Aletes through the orientation of the forum and the curia. Thus, during the summer solstice – a period of the year solemnised by Semitic peoples – the sunrise, as seen from these constructions, occurs over the nearby mountain associated with the discoverer of the silver mines.

== See also ==
- Iberian religion
- Mastia
- Sierra Minera de Cartagena-La Unión
