= Exemplary Women of Antiquity =

Set of paintings by Andrea Mantegna

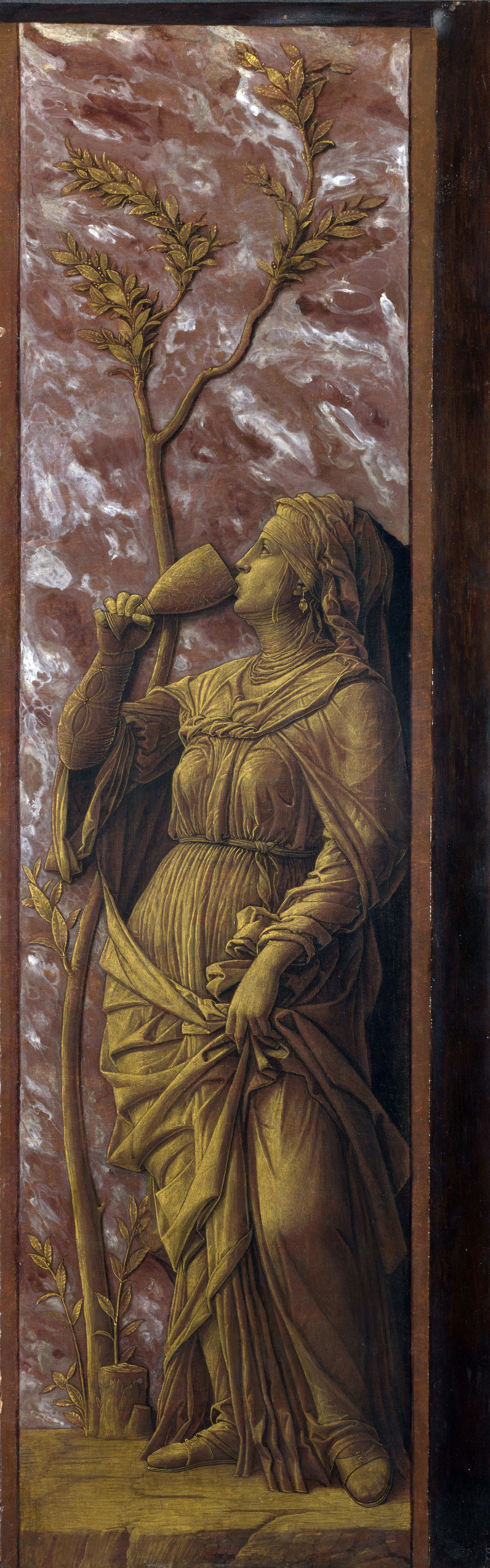
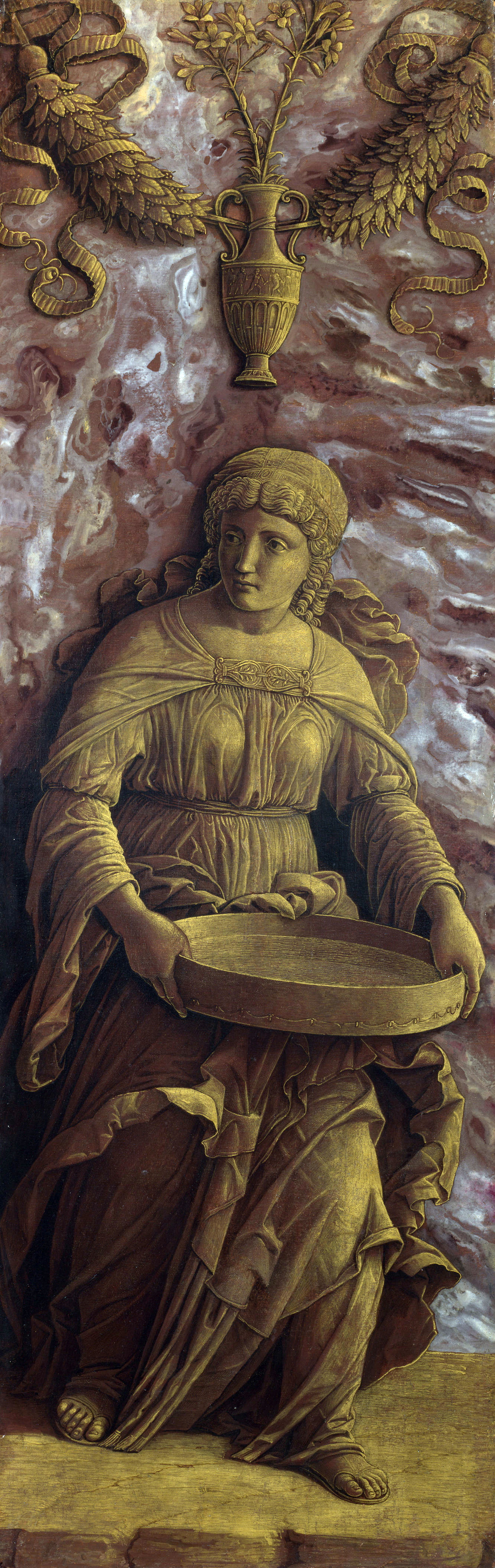
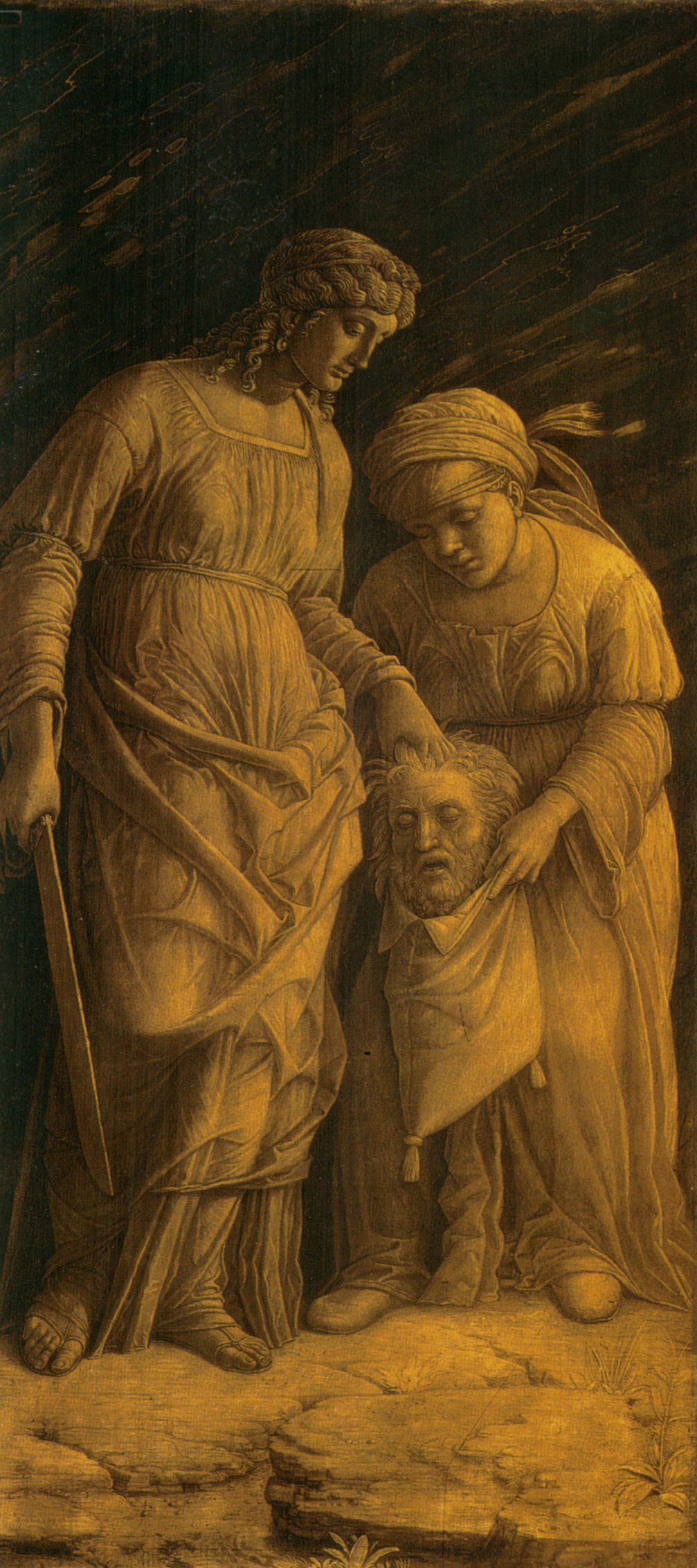
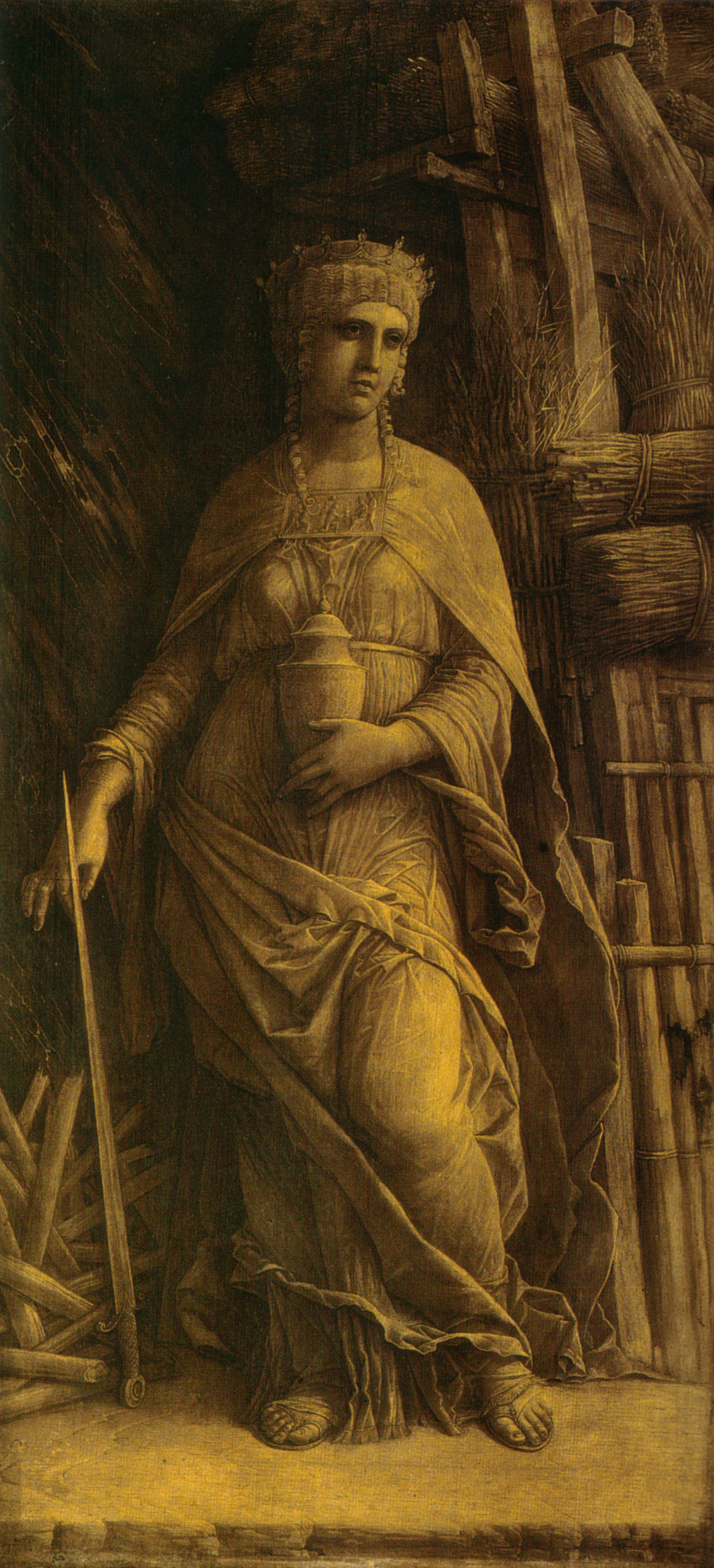
Sophonisba, Tuccia, Judith, Dido.

Exemplary Women of Antiquity is a set of paintings produced between 1495 and 1500 by Andrea Mantegna. They show the Carthaginian noblewoman Sophonisba poisoning herself to avoid being paraded in a Roman triumph, the Roman Vestal Virgin Tuccia proving her chastity by carrying water in a sieve, Judith with the head of Holofernes and Dido holding Sychaeus's funeral urn. Infrared reflectography has uncovered a signature on the back of Judith reading And.a Mantegnia. P[inxit]. (Andrea Mantegna painted [it]). Sophonisba and Tuccia are egg-tempera on poplar panel, whilst Judith and Dido are glue-tempera on linen canvas.

All four works are in monochrome or grisaille and imitate relief sculpture, a style very popular in the Mantuan court at the time thanks to the expense of importing marble from neighbouring Italian states and the lack of sculptors at court. Another example was the same artist's The Introduction of the Cult of Cybele at Rome from around the same times. Tuccia and Sophonisba originally had the same dimensions.

== History ==
All four were attested in the inventory of the belongings of Federico II Gonzaga, Duke of Mantua, produced in 1542 two years after his death. In 1738 they were next mentioned in an inventory of Johann Matthias von der Schulenburg's collection, though sometimes the paintings are mentioned with dimensions that do not match the current dimensions of any of the four works. They were separated into two pairs at a Christie's auction on 13 April 1775, with Tuccia and Sophonisba entering the Duke of Hamilton's collection and Judith and Dido sold to John Taylor. The two paintings in the Hamilton collection were sold to the National Gallery in London in 1882 when that collection was dispersed, whilst those originally bought by Taylor were sold in 1912 and after a couple of changes of ownership entered the Montreal Museum of Fine Arts in Canada.
