= The Continence of Scipio (Bellini) =

Painting by Giovanni Bellini

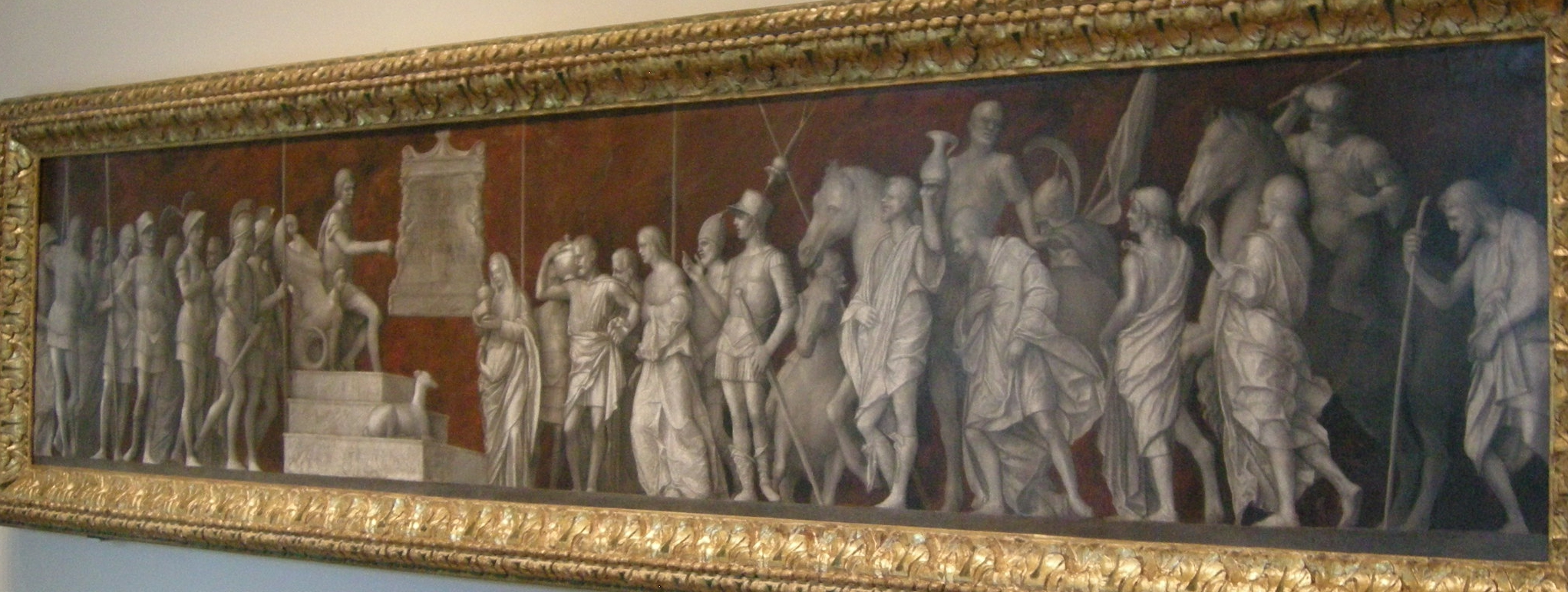
- Artist: Giovanni Bellini
- Year: 1507–08
- Medium: oil on canvas
- Dimensions: 74.8 cm × 356.2 cm (29.4 in × 140.2 in)
- Location: National Gallery of Art, Washington, D.C.

The Continence of Scipio or An Episode from the Life of Publius Cornelius Scipio is a painting in oils on canvas by the Italian Renaissance artist Giovanni Bellini, dating to 1507–08 and now in the National Gallery of Art in Washington, D.C.

== History ==
It was probably commissioned in 1505 from Andrea Mantegna by cardinal Marco Cornaro for the 'studiolo' or study of his brother Francesco's palace in San Polo. This would make it a pendant to The Introduction of the Cult of Cybele at Rome, with the pair possibly intended to form part of a series of four works. However, Mantegna did not begin any of the four except Introduction, the only one that Mantegna he completed before his death in 1506. He and Bellini had trained together as young men and the latter was also the former's brother in law. Bellini was himself an old man by 1506 but still took over this part of the commission and produced it in one of Mantegna's signature styles, grisaille (monochrome). Roberto Longhi has suggested that Sofonisba and Tuccia from Mantegna's Exemplary Women of Antiquity series were produced to go with Introduction and Continence – they are the same height as them but are on panel not canvas and no documents survive to support the theory.

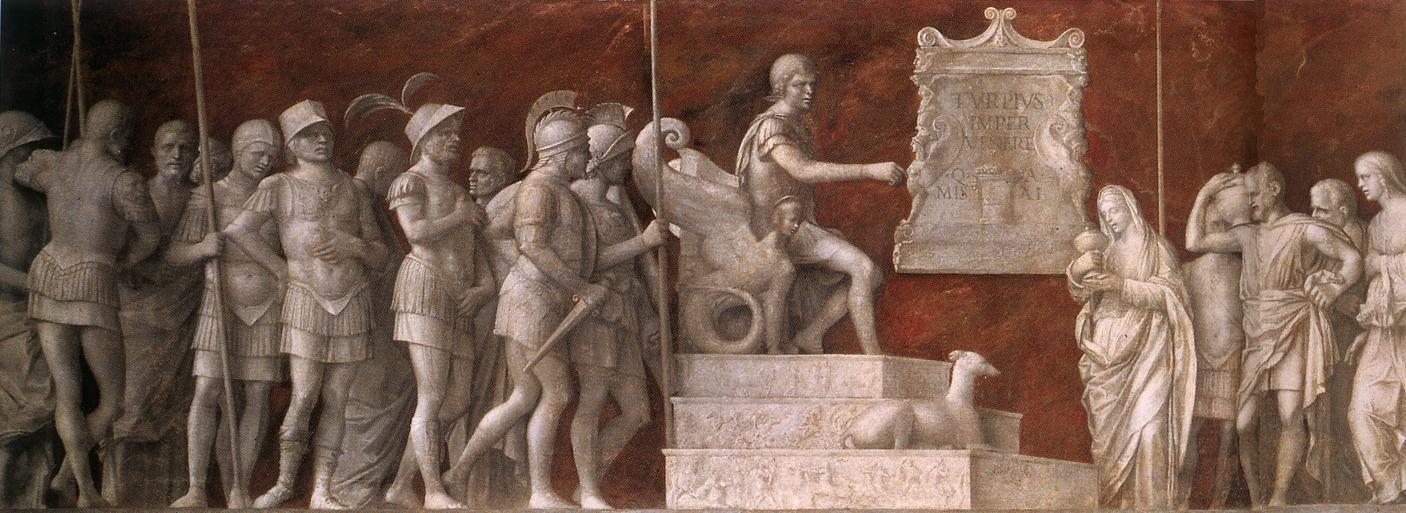
First half

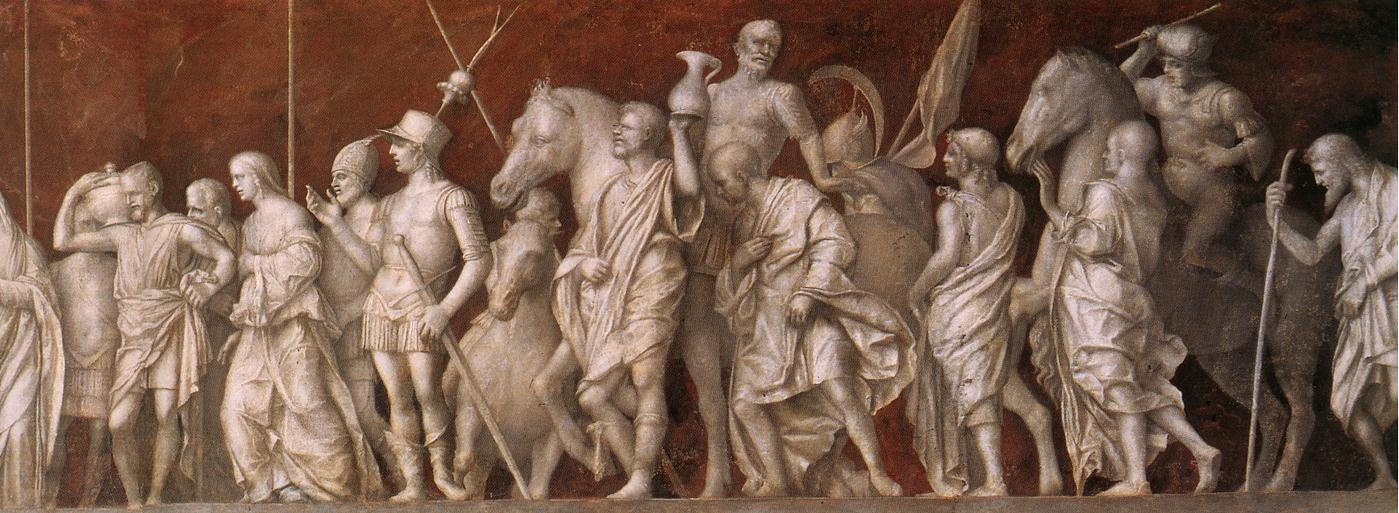
Second half

Francesco Cornaro was a Venetian patrician and his family was supposed to be descended from the Cornelia gens of ancient Rome, hence the choice of two subjects from that gens' participation in the Second Punic War. Continence is derived from a story in Livy and Valerius Maximus about the aftermath of the capture of Carthago Nova in 209 BC by Publius Cornelius Scipio. A virgin was personally delivered to him as a hostage, but she pleaded to be returned to her parents and Celtiberian fiancé. He agreed on the single condition that her fiancé would work for peace between Rome and Carthage. Just left of centre Scipio sits on a throne and refuses the gold brought to him by the woman's parents as her ransom. She stands at the foot of his throne with her fiancé, who is shown with a sword and helmet. Between Scipio and the virgin is a plaque reading TVRPIVS / IMPER / VENERE / .Q. A. / MIS AI. The more peripheral figures were painted by Bellini's studio and overall his and their figures show more animation than Mantegna's more rigid classicism, showing that Bellini had taken on board innovations by Giorgione but refused to be influenced by Dürer.

The work reappeared on the art market in 1873 when it was sold by Sir John Charles Robinson (1824–1913) to Sir Francis Cook, 1st Baronet (1817–1901) of Doughty House, Richmond-upon-Thames. Cook's son Sir Frederick Cook, 2nd Baronet, his grandson Sir Herbert Cook, 3rd Baronet and his great-grandson Sir Francis Cook, 4th Baronet all inherited the painting in turn. Sir Francis Cook sold it in February 1948 to Gualtiero Volterra, who was buying it on behalf of Count Alessandro Contini-Bonacossi of Florence. The count briefly brought it back to Italy before selling it to the Samuel H. Kress Foundation in March 1949. The Foundation finally gave it to its current owner in 1952.

== See also ==
- List of works by Giovanni Bellini
