= Battle of New Carthage =

209 BC battle of the Second Punic War

- Part of the Second Punic War
Date	Early 209 BC
Location	New Carthage, Iberia 37°36′N 0°59′W
Result	Roman victory

Belligerents
Rome	Carthage

Commanders and leaders
Publius Cornelius Scipio	Mago (POW)

Strength
27,500; • 25,000 infantry; • 2,500 cavalry; • 35 galleys	More than 3,000; • 1,000 soldiers; • 2,000 civilian levies

Casualties and losses
Unknown	All soldiers and civilians killed or captured
- The location of New Carthage, shown on a map of modern Spain

The battle of New Carthage took place in early 209 BC when a Roman army under Publius Cornelius Scipio successfully assaulted New Carthage, the capital of Carthaginian Iberia, which was defended by a garrison under Mago. The battle was part of the Second Punic War.

In 211 BC the Romans in Iberia (modern Spain and Portugal) were heavily defeated at the battle of the Upper Baetis. Reinforcements arrived in early 210 BC and Scipio brought further reinforcements when he took command late in the year. Scipio felt unable to draw into battle and defeat any of the three strong Carthaginian armies in the peninsula and so decided to strike at the material centre of Carthaginian power in Iberia: its capital, New Carthage. He arrived outside the city early in 209 BC and commenced his attack the next day. After defeating a Carthaginian force outside the walls, he pressed an attack on the east gate. Simultaneously men from the Roman ships attempted to escalade the wall to the south from the harbour area. Both attacks were repulsed.

In the afternoon Scipio renewed the attacks. Hard-pressed, Mago moved men from the north wall, which overlooked a broad, shallow lagoon. Anticipating this, Scipio sent a force of 500 men through the lagoon to scale the north wall, which they did unopposed. They fought their way to the east gate, opened it from inside and let in their comrades. New Carthage fell and was sacked, and Mago surrendered the citadel and the last of his troops. Vast amounts of precious metal and war materiel were seized. New Carthage became the logistics centre of the Roman war effort in Iberia and by 206 BC the Carthaginians had been expelled from the peninsula.

== Background ==
When the Second Punic War broke out between Rome and Carthage in 218 BC, much of Iberia (modern Spain and Portugal) was controlled by Carthage or its allies. One of Rome's first actions of the war was to send an army to north-east Iberia. After seven years of mixed fortunes, the Romans hired 20,000 Celtiberian mercenaries to reinforce their regular army and advanced into southern Iberia. There they divided their forces into two armies. When the Celtiberians deserted, the Romans were heavily defeated in two separate battles in 211 BC.

The Roman general, and later consul, Gaius Claudius Nero brought over reinforcements in 210 BC and stabilised the situation, holding on to a small lodgement in north-east Iberia. Towards the end of 210 BC Publius Cornelius Scipio (Note: Publius Scipio was the bereaved son of the previous Roman co-commander in Iberia, also named Publius Scipio, and the nephew of the other co-commander, Gnaeus Scipio.) arrived with further Roman reinforcements to replace Nero in command of all Roman forces in Iberia. Scipio was extremely young by Roman standards for such a command: he was in his mid-twenties. He was unprecedentedly inexperienced to hold such a position by Roman standards of the time, never having held any senior positions.

Scipio commanded a total of 31,000 men: 28,000 infantry and 3,000 cavalry. There were three separate Carthaginian armies in Iberia, each as large as or larger than the Roman force. The Carthaginian armies were well away from the area occupied by the Romans: one was in central Iberia led by the overall Carthaginian commander in Iberia, Hasdrubal Barca; (Note: Hasdrubal was a younger brother of Hannibal Barca, who had led a Carthaginian army from Iberia to Roman Italy in 218 BC. The Carthaginian army had been campaigning there for the previous eight years with considerable success.) one near Gades (modern Cádiz); and the third in Lusitania (approximately modern Portugal). This division of Carthaginian forces made it difficult for them to mutually support each other. This would have allowed Scipio to easily march his army from the Roman base at Tarraco (modern Tarragona) to confront just one of these armies; probably the nearest, that under Hasdrubal in central Iberia.

At this time it was extremely difficult to force an unwilling opponent to give battle. Pitched battles were usually preceded by the two armies camping 2–12 kilometres (1–7 mi) apart for days or weeks; sometimes forming up in battle order each day. If either commander felt at a disadvantage, he might march off without engaging or decline to leave his fortified camp. Such a tactic could have led to an inconclusive campaign, at the end of which the Romans would have had to retreat, which would have demoralised their Iberian allies and probably have led to defections among them. Alternatively one of the other Carthaginian armies may have come to Hasdrubal's assistance, which would have raised the possibility of the Romans suffering a defeat similar to that of 211 BC. The defeats of 211 BC had badly damaged Rome's standing with the Iberian tribes. A rapid Roman victory would stiffen the morale of those tribes which had remained loyal to Rome and encourage others to come over. A continuing perception of Roman weakness would encourage defections.

== Prelude ==
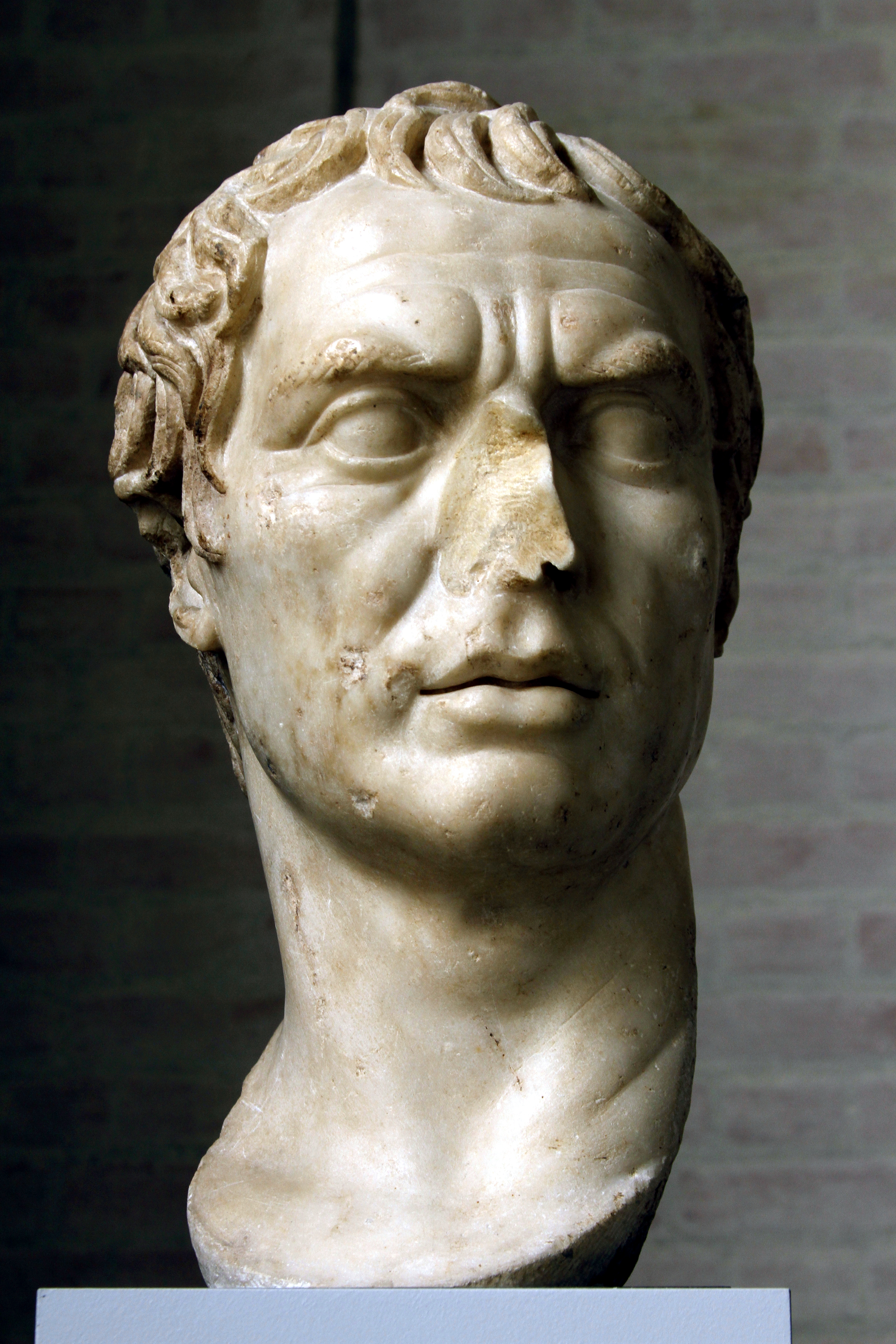
2nd century BC marble bust of Publius Cornelius Scipio

When he arrived in Iberia Scipio was set on adopting an immediate aggressive stance and so decided that instead of seeking battle with one of the Carthaginian armies, he would strike at the material centre of Carthaginian power in Iberia: its capital, New Carthage. New Carthage (known to the Romans as Carthago Nova) was founded in about 227 BC by the then ruler of Carthaginian Iberia, Hasdrubal the Fair. (Note: Hasdrubal was an uncle to Hannibal and Hasdrubal Barca by marriage.) It possessed a large, deep-water, harbour with good facilities and was well positioned for travel to and from Carthage. There were productive silver mines in the nearby mountains. The city harbour was on a south-facing bay, with an entrance only about 600 metres (2,000 ft) wide; the city was on its northern shore. A hilly promontory separated the bay from a large, shallow, tidal lagoon to the north. The city was built on and between the five hills of this promontory. Its only connection to the mainland was a 300-metre-wide (300 yd) isthmus to the east. The lagoon was connected to the main bay by a narrow channel to the west of New Carthage. The city lay 450 kilometres (280 mi) south of the main Roman base.

Scipio sent spies to report back on the geography around New Carthage, its defences and its garrison. He learnt it was fortified by strong and high walls 3,700 metres (12,000 ft) long, which faced wide bodies of water for most of their length. There was a well-fortified gate on its eastern side, the main access to the city. The Carthaginians used New Carthage both as a mint and as their main treasury for Iberia. They also employed it as their main arsenal and military harbour for equipment and materiel for the war in Iberia, as well as holding prisoner there many Iberian captives who were hostage for their tribes' good behaviour. Its commander, Mago, (Note: Not the same Mago who was Hannibal's youngest brother.) had only 1,000 regular troops with which to defend the city, supplemented by what forces he could muster from the local populace; in the event a further 2,000 reasonably effective militia and an unknown number of irregulars. (Note: The modern historian Dexter Hoyos describes the small size of this garrison as "unjustified strategic complacency" by Hasdrubal Barca, who had overall command in Iberia for the Carthaginians.) Scipio also reputedly learned details of how fordable the lagoon to the north was, in particular the effect of the tides and, possibly, the wind on it.

Once they reached New Carthage the Romans would only have a week or two to capture it before a Carthaginian army was likely to come to its aid. Yet it was highly unusual for well-fortified towns to be successfully stormed. If such places were taken it was usually either because of treachery from within, improbable in the case of New Carthage, or siege. But sieges normally lasted months and at least one Carthaginian army was sure to arrive before New Carthage was captured via siege. (Note: When Hannibal besieged Saguntum, 350 kilometres (220 mi) north of New Carthage, in 219 BC, it took him eight months to capture it.)

Early in 209 BC, Scipio left 3,000 infantry and 300 cavalry to garrison Roman-occupied Iberia and marched south with the balance, 25,000 infantry and 2,500 cavalry. Thirty-five galleys set sail under Scipio's second in command, Gaius Laelius, intending to rendezvous with the main army at New Carthage. Such was the secrecy around these movements that when the Roman forces set out only Scipio and Laelius were aware of their destination; the other Roman commanders were enlightened at some point en route.

== Battle ==
New Carthage and the various Roman assaults and feints

=== First assault ===
Arriving at New Carthage after a rapid march, the Romans established a camp on a hill in the middle of the isthmus connecting the city with the mainland, opposite the main gate. A rampart and ditch protected the rear (east) of the camp, but this was not repeated on the side facing the gate. Mago kept part of his regular troops in reserve in the citadel, which was in the west of the city, and the balance were posted on or near the southern wall. The 2,000 militia were stationed near the east gate and the rest of the town levy were issued with missiles and stationed all round the perimeter. Scipio made a stirring speech and the next morning the Romans attempted to storm the city: the Roman galleys assaulted the southern walls from the harbour while 2,000 picked legionaries made ready to attack the east gate and the walls to either side; both were supplied with ladders with which to attempt to escalade the walls.

During the Punic Wars it was usual for the garrisons of besieged towns and cities to initially give battle outside their walls, regardless of the relative sizes of the attacking and defending forces. Failure to do so was taken as an indication of the defender's weakness and lack of confidence by both sides. New Carthage was no exception and the 2,000 militia sallied from the east gate to counter-attack the Roman assault party. The Romans hung back, causing the initial fighting to develop nearer their camp than the city, perhaps 400 metres (1,300 ft) from the gate. Even so, given the narrowness of the isthmus, it was not possible for the Romans to readily bring their superior numbers to bear or to outflank the Carthaginians. At first the Carthaginian militia did well, but as the fighting continued the Romans were able to replace tired and wounded men from their large reserve in their camp; the Carthaginians possessed no such reserve. The Carthaginians began to be pushed back and eventually broke and fled.

The Romans pursued, inflicting heavy casualties on the Carthaginians as they struggled to retreat through the east gate. The Romans attempted to force their way through the gate before it could be closed, but failed. They then endeavoured to storm the walls on either side of the gate before the defenders could reorganise. This latter involved the attackers climbing the ladders which accompanied them amid missile fire from the defenders, then attempting to fight their way onto the walls. As the legionaries were attempting to do this, the marines from the Roman fleet were attempting the same thing against the south wall. The Carthaginian defenders were able to initially hold off these assaults and as the survivors of the militia sortie reinforced them on the walls Roman casualties mounted and success looked unlikely. Eventually, Scipio called off the attack.

=== Second assault ===
It was usual after a failed assault on fortifications for the attacking force to rest for several days before considering renewing their attack. To the Carthaginians' surprise, the Romans renewed their efforts that afternoon, with fresh troops and fresh supplies of scaling ladders. The galleys under Laelius again attacked the south wall, another force of infantry manoeuvred in the area of the channel to the west of the city – although this was a feint – and the main effort was again against the east gate and the nearby walls. Having expended most of their ammunition repelling the morning attacks, the Carthaginians were not able to respond as effectively to these; they were able to hold the walls with difficulty. Concerned, Mago moved reinforcements to the threatened areas, which resulted in the unthreatened northern wall being denuded of defenders. Scipio had maintained a reserve of 500 picked men and held them ready to move against the north wall, anticipating that threats from the other three cardinal directions would lead to its defences being weakened. To achieve its objective, this force would need to cross the broad lagoon.

The near-contemporary and usually reliable Greek historian Polybius wrote an account of the battle. According to the traditional translation of this he states that each evening the tide caused the water level in the lagoon north of New Carthage to lower to the extent that it was fordable. He continues that Scipio learnt of this during his gathering of intelligence in Tarraco and so timed his attacks as to make it probable that the wall bordering the lagoon was lightly held at the very time he wished to send a force to ford the lagoon and escalade the wall. The ancient Roman historian Livy, writing two centuries later, contradicts this – perhaps aware that tides do not operate on a 24-hour cycle – saying that the effect was because of a regular north wind piling up the waters of the lagoon each evening. Both of these accounts raise problems, not least why the Carthaginians were not aware of whatever changes took place and failed to take precautions.

Modern historians have offered several interpretations of Polybius's account and suggested different ways in which the level of the lagoon could have been artificially lowered. Among the latter have been its use as a fish farm or a salt evaporation pond, the level being controlled by sluices on the channel to the west of the city taking advantage of the 0.6 metres (2 ft 0 in) tidal range in the area. Benedict Lowe writes that the manoeuvres to the west of the city were not a feint, but the successful capture and opening of these sluices. J. H. Richardson, however, dismisses both Polybian and Livian accounts on grounds of hydrological and geological impossibility: tides at New Carthage are too small and slow to have drained the lagoon and there is insufficient space in which to produce a wind which could have blown out the million of litres of water contained. He instead suggests that the lagoon was itself largely fordable and that no hydrological event was necessary.

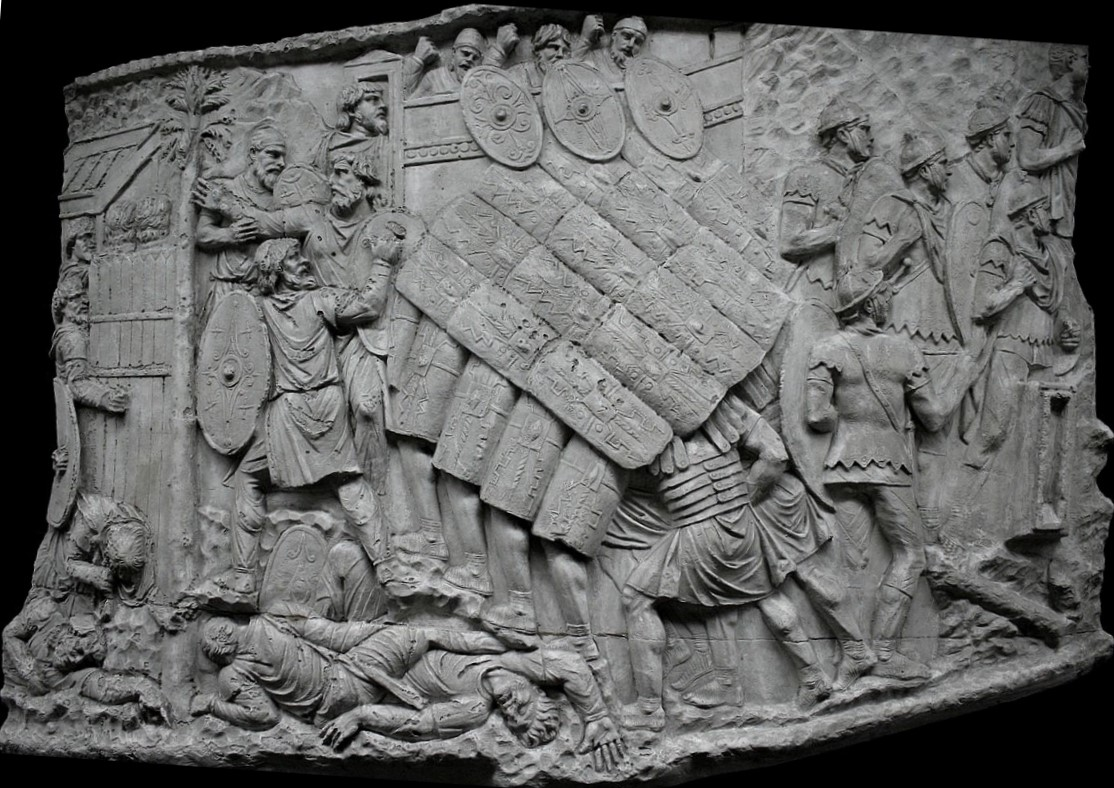
A Roman testudo formation attacking the gate of a fortification. The armour is from a later period.

Where the Romans crossed the lagoon to approach the north wall is also uncertain. Modern accounts suggest variously that an underwater ridge was followed across a relatively deep lagoon from the north shore; that a uniformly shallow lagoon was traversed from the north; or that the Romans stayed close to the north wall, following the south shore of the lagoon. In any event, the 500 Romans were guided across the lagoon, reached the north wall without difficulty and scaled it. Their approach was not noticed by the Carthaginians.

At the east gate the Romans attacked in a testudo formation, with their shields held over their heads and overlapping. Thus protected the soldiers at the front hacked at the gate with axes. The assault against the south wall, by troops landed from the Roman galleys, continued to be pressed hard; after the battle one of the men attacking from this direction shared the award for being the first onto the walls. While the focus of the Carthaginians' efforts continued to be the east and south, the 500 Romans who had gained access from the north attacked east along the wall, cutting down the few defenders they encountered. These Romans gained access to the east gate from the inside and opened it to their comrades outside. At about the same time the Carthaginian defence as a whole wavered and the escalading forces got onto the walls in increasing numbers.

=== Inside New Carthage ===
More and more Romans entered the city, although there continued to be a danger that the Carthaginians would get the best of the fighting on the walls and in the narrow streets and expel the Romans. Mago was occupying the citadel in the west of New Carthage with many, perhaps most, of the 1,000 Carthaginian regulars and a counterattack spearheaded by these troops was likely. Scipio joined the fighting for the first time, entering New Carthage with a large force under his direct command and heading for the marketplace in the centre of the city. The rest of the Romans who had broken into the city were instructed to sack it, which they did with great enthusiasm. All Carthaginian soldiers and civilians encountered were massacred, and all items of value were seized and deposited at the marketplace.

Scipio sent a force from the marketplace against one of the city's hills where the Carthaginians were fighting on and personally led 1,000 men to the citadel, where he demanded Mago's surrender. Mago initially refused, but once it became clear that the Romans had irrevocably taken control of the city he surrendered both the citadel and his command. With the citadel secure and resistance at an end, Scipio called a halt to the sack. Apart from the 1,000 men in the citadel with Scipio and those in their camp, the Romans spent the night in the marketplace. The next day some of the loot was auctioned off to the traders who always accompanied a Roman army. The proceeds of this and the rest of the plunder were divided between all the men of the legions, including those who had not participated in the fighting, the amount dependent on their rank.

Later Scipio also rewarded those who had distinguished themselves during the capture of the city. The corona muralis, the crown awarded to the first man over the wall, was fiercely contested by a centurion of the Fourth Legion, Quintus Trebellius, and a marine, Sextus Digitius. After a detailed investigation, Scipio gave the crown to both, accepting that both men had reached the wall at the same time.

=== Plunder and prisoners ===
As well as the portable valuables looted during the sack, the Romans seized a great quantity of war materiel. The martial booty has been described by modern historians as "colossal" or "immense". It included 63 merchant ships, several catapults, large quantities of armour and personal weapons, a working mint and a well-filled treasury including 600 talents of silver. (Note: 600 talents was approximately 16,140 kilograms (16 long tons) of silver.) Large stocks of food were also seized.

Some 10,000 Carthaginian men survived the massacre associated with the sack to be taken prisoner. They included 15 members of the Carthaginian Senate and two members of the Carthaginian inner council, the Council of Thirty. Also taken were more than 300 hostages: the relatives of the leaders of Iberian tribes allied to Carthage who were being held to ensure their relatives good behaviour. Scipio ostentatiously ensured that they were treated well, especially the women among them, and returned them to their homes if their tribes switched their allegiance to Rome. Some modern sources state they were all allowed home as a gesture of good will.

Rather than enslaving the citizens among the captives, Scipio released them and their families to their ransacked homes. The poorer non-citizens, who mostly worked as artisans, were enslaved; they were to continue their normal work, but for the Roman war effort and were promised their freedom once the war was over. The stronger and fitter of the captured slaves were impressed to crew 18 of the captured ships, which were converted to military purposes; again they were promised their freedom once the war concluded. For the rest of the war in Iberia the Roman effort was largely self-supporting; troops were recruited locally and they and the Romans were fed and equipped from local resources. Scipio repaired the city's fortifications and shortly after left a substantial garrison and withdrew the rest of his troops to Tarraco.

== Aftermath ==
The capture of New Carthage gave the Romans control over almost all the Mediterranean coast of Iberia and greatly hampered communications between Carthage and its armies and leaders in Iberia. So long as the Carthaginians had held New Carthage the Roman bases were under constant threat of attack and any Roman attempts to exert control in Iberia far from their enclave in the north east would have found Carthaginian forces from New Carthage threatening their communications; these threats were now lifted. The unexpected blow caused the Carthaginian generals to fall back on the defensive; continuing to disagree among themselves, they made no attempt to combine their forces even though in total they far outnumbered the Romans.

In the spring of 208 BC Hasdrubal moved to engage Scipio at the battle of Baecula. The Carthaginians were defeated, but Hasdrubal was able to withdraw the majority of his army and prevent any Roman pursuit; most of his losses were among his Iberian allies. Scipio was not able to prevent Hasdrubal from leading his depleted army over the western passes of the Pyrenees into Gaul. In 207 BC, after recruiting heavily in Gaul, Hasdrubal crossed the Alps into Italy in an attempt to join his brother, Hannibal, but was defeated at the battle of the Metaurus before he could. In 206 BC, at the battle of Ilipa, Scipio with 48,000 men, half Italian and half Iberian, defeated a Carthaginian army of 54,500 men and 32 elephants. This sealed the fate of the Carthaginians in Iberia and the last Carthaginian-held city in the peninsula, Gades, defected to the Romans.

== Notes, citations and sources ==
=== Sources ===
- Bagnall, Nigel (1999). The Punic Wars: Rome, Carthage and the Struggle for the Mediterranean. London: Pimlico. ISBN 978-0-7126-6608-4.
- Carey, Brian Todd (2007). Hannibal's Last Battle: Zama & the Fall of Carthage. Barnsley, South Yorkshire: Pen & Sword. ISBN 978-1-84415-635-1.
- Champion, Craige B. (2015) [2011]. "Polybius and the Punic Wars". In Hoyos, Dexter (ed.). A Companion to the Punic Wars. Chichester, West Sussex: John Wiley & Sons. pp. 95–110. ISBN 978-1-1190-2550-4.
- Coarelli, Filippo (1981). "La doppia tradizione sulla morte di Romolo e gli auguracula dell'Arx e del Quirinale". In Pallottino, Massimo (ed.). li Etruschi e Roma: atti dell'incontro di studio in onore di Massimo Pallottino (in Italian). Rome: G. Bretschneider. pp. 173–188. ISBN 978-88-85007-51-2.
- Edwell, Peter (2015) [2011]. "War Abroad: Spain, Sicily, Macedon, Africa". In Hoyos, Dexter (ed.). A Companion to the Punic Wars. Chichester, West Sussex: John Wiley & Sons. pp. 320–338. ISBN 978-1-119-02550-4.
- Erdkamp, Paul (2015) [2011]. "Manpower and Food Supply in the First and Second Punic Wars". In Hoyos, Dexter (ed.). A Companion to the Punic Wars. Chichester, West Sussex: John Wiley & Sons. pp. 58–76. ISBN 978-1-1190-2550-4.
- Etcheto, Henri (2012). Les Scipions. Famille et pouvoir à Rome à l'époque républicaine (in French). Bordeaux: Ausonius Éditions. ISBN 978-2-35613-073-0.
- Goldsworthy, Adrian (2001). Cannae. London: Cassell. ISBN 978-0-304-35714-7.
- Goldsworthy, Adrian (2004) [2003]. In the Name of Rome: The Men Who Won the Roman Empire. London: Phoenix. ISBN 978-0-7538-1789-6.
- Goldsworthy, Adrian (2006) [2000]. The Fall of Carthage: The Punic Wars 265–146 BC. London: Phoenix. ISBN 978-0-304-36642-2.
- Hoyos, Dexter (2003). Hannibal's Dynasty: Power and Politics in the Western Mediterranean, 247–183 BC. London: Routledge. ISBN 978-0-203-41782-9.
- Hoyos, Dexter (2015). Mastering the West: Rome and Carthage at War. Oxford: Oxford University Press. ISBN 978-0-19-986010-4.
- Lazenby, John (1996). The First Punic War: A Military History. Stanford, California: Stanford University Press. ISBN 978-0-8047-2673-3.
- Lazenby, John (1998) [1st pub. 1978]. Hannibal's War: A Military History of the Second Punic War. Warminster: Aris & Phillips. ISBN 978-0-85668-080-9.
- Lowe, Benedict J. (2000). "Polybius 10.10.12 and the Existence of Salt-Flats at Carthago Nova". Phoenix. 54 (1/2 (Spring - Summer)). Classical Association of Canada: 39–52. doi:10.2307/1089089. JSTOR 1089089.
- Miles, Richard (2011). Carthage Must be Destroyed. London: Penguin. ISBN 978-0-14-101809-6.
- Richardson, J H (2018). "P Cornelius Scipio and the Capture of New Carthage: The Tide, the Wind, and Other Fantasies". Classical Quarterly. 68 (2): 458–474. doi:10.1017/S0009838818000368. ISSN 0009-8388. S2CID 171813844.
- Sabin, Philip (1996). "The Mechanics of Battle in the Second Punic War". Bulletin of the Institute of Classical Studies. Supplement. 67 (67): 59–79. JSTOR 43767903.
- Zimmermann, Klaus (2015) [2011]. "Roman Strategy and Aims in the Second Punic War". In Hoyos, Dexter (ed.). A Companion to the Punic Wars. Chichester, West Sussex: John Wiley & Sons. pp. 280–298. ISBN 978-1-1190-2550-4.
