= Battle of Murcia =

1706 battle

Coordinates: 37.9833°N 1.1333°W

Battle of Huerto de las Bombas
- Part of War of the Spanish Succession
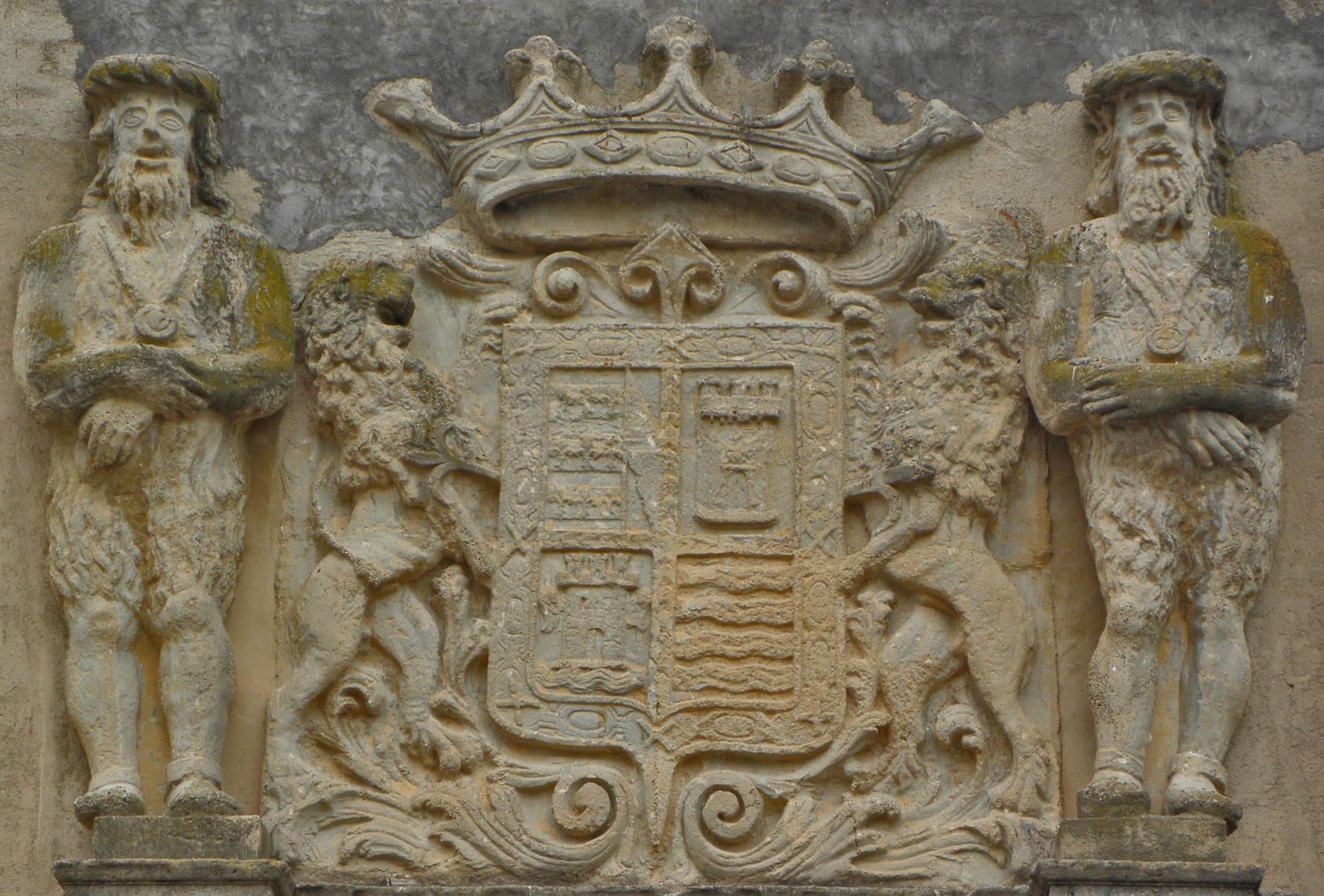
- Detail of the entrance of the former palace of the Marquisate of Torre Pacheco at the Huerto de las Bombas.
Date	4 September 1706
Location	Murcia, Region of Murcia
Result	Bourbon victory

Belligerents
Bourbon Spain	England (Netherlands) United Provinces; Scotland

Commanders and leaders
Luis de Belluga	Unknown

Strength
500 infantry, 200 cavalry	6,000

Casualties and losses
Unknown	400

The Battle of Murcia or Battle of the Huerto de las Bombas was a battle on 4 September 1706, between the Bourbons under bishop Luis de Belluga and a combined British and Dutch force. It formed part of the War of the Spanish Succession and occurred near the Spanish town of Murcia. It resulted in a Bourbon victory.

== War of the Spanish Succession ==
Anticipating the death of King Charles II of Spain without an heir, the major European powers proposed the Elector Prince Joseph Ferdinand of Bavaria as successor, agreeing on a division of the territorial possessions of the Spanish Monarchy among themselves. However, the candidate died in 1699, and in his final will, Charles II named the Duke Philip of Anjou as his heir. Philip entered Barcelona on 2 October, and the Cortes concluded on 14 January 1702 with the king swearing to the Catalan constitutions.

Dissatisfied with this outcome, the great powers formed the Grand Alliance around Charles of Austria, leading to the outbreak of the War of the Spanish Succession.

== The War reaches Southern Spain ==
The English capture of Gibraltar in 1704 marked the beginning of the pro-Austrian (Austriacist) movement in the region. The Archduke embarked from Lisbon to the Mediterranean Sea, stopping at Altea where he was proclaimed king, igniting the Valencian revolt of the maulets under Juan Bautista Basset.

The pro-Austrian uprising spread to Cartagena, leading to a power shift in the city and the proclamation of the Archduke as king. The conflict escalated in the Kingdom of Murcia, where the Bourbon forces, led by Bishop Belluga, resisted the pro-Austrian advance.

== The Battle ==
On 4 September, an Anglo-Dutch regiment of 6000 infantry, several artillery pieces, and a team of engineers with a portable wooden bridge advanced from Espinardo with the intent to occupy Murcia. Bishop Belluga ordered the irrigation canals to be flooded to hinder the infantry's progress. Both sides exchanged artillery fire before the pro-Austrian forces withdrew.

== Aftermath ==
The Bourbon forces, strengthened by the arrival of the Duke of Berwick, launched an offensive towards the south of the Kingdom of Valencia, reclaiming Orihuela, Elche and Cartagena by the end of 1706.
