= Xueta =

Ethnoreligious and social group on the Spanish island of Mallorca

Xuetes
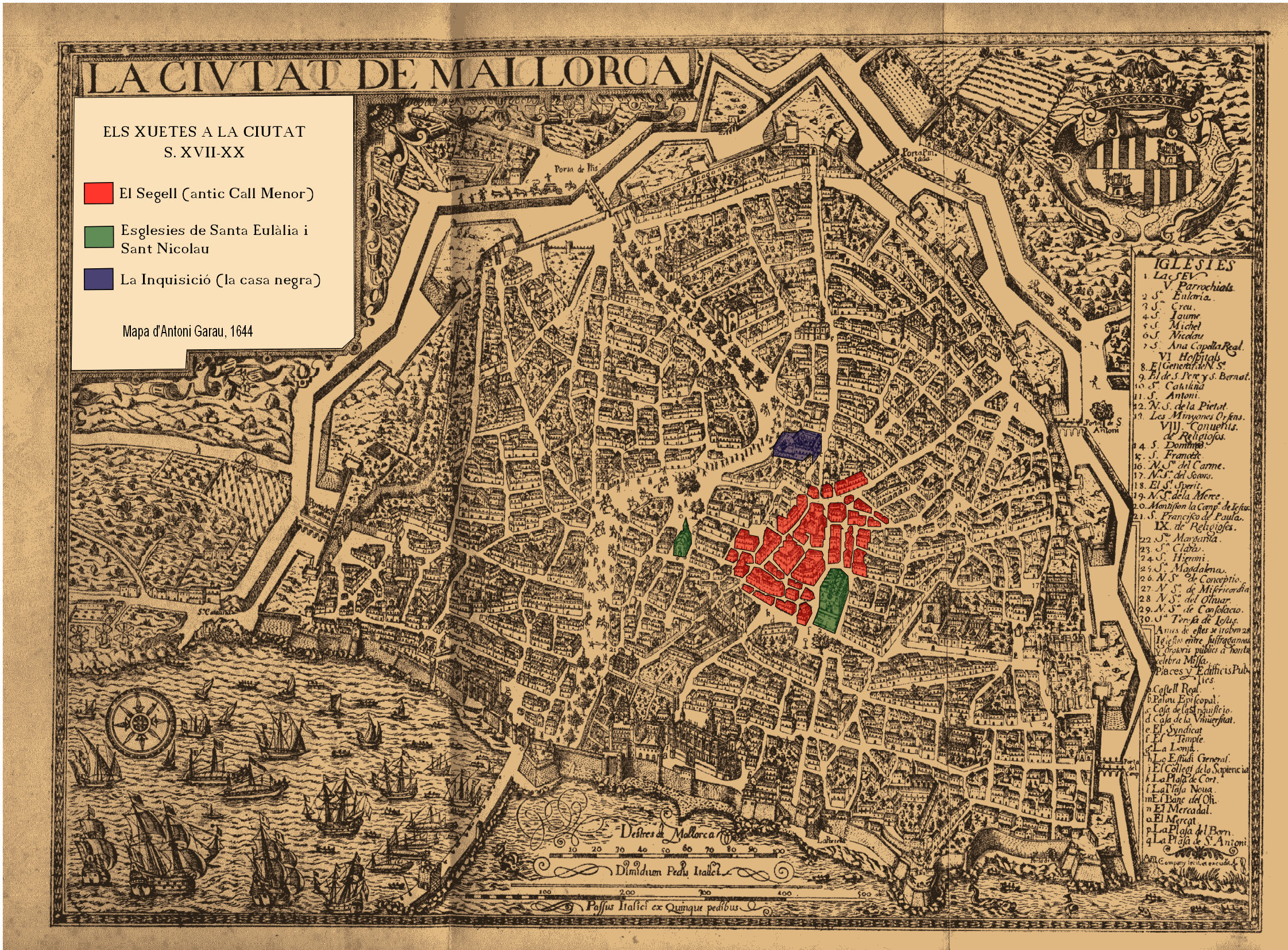

Total population
- 18,000–20,000 (approx.)

Regions with significant populations
- Mallorca

Languages
- Catalan, Spanish

Religion
- Xueta Christianity, mainstream Catholicism, Crypto-Judaism; some individuals now reverting to mainstream Judaism

Related ethnic groups
- Other Jews, especially Iberian Jews

The Xuetes (Catalan pronunciation: [ʃuˈətə]; singular Xueta, also known as Xuetons and spelled as Chuetas) are a social group on the Spanish island of Mallorca, in the Mediterranean Sea, who are descendants of Mallorcan Jews who were either Conversos (forcible converts to Christianity) or crypto-Jews, forced to keep their religion hidden. They practiced strict endogamy by marrying only within their own group. Many of their descendants observe a syncretist form of Christian worship known as Xueta Christianity.

The Xuetes were stigmatized until the first half of the 20th century. In the latter part of the century, the spread of freedom of religion and laïcité reduced both the social pressure and community ties. An estimated 18,000 people in the island carry Xueta surnames in the 21st century, but only a few people (even if with Xueta surnames) are aware of the complex history of this group.

== Etymology ==
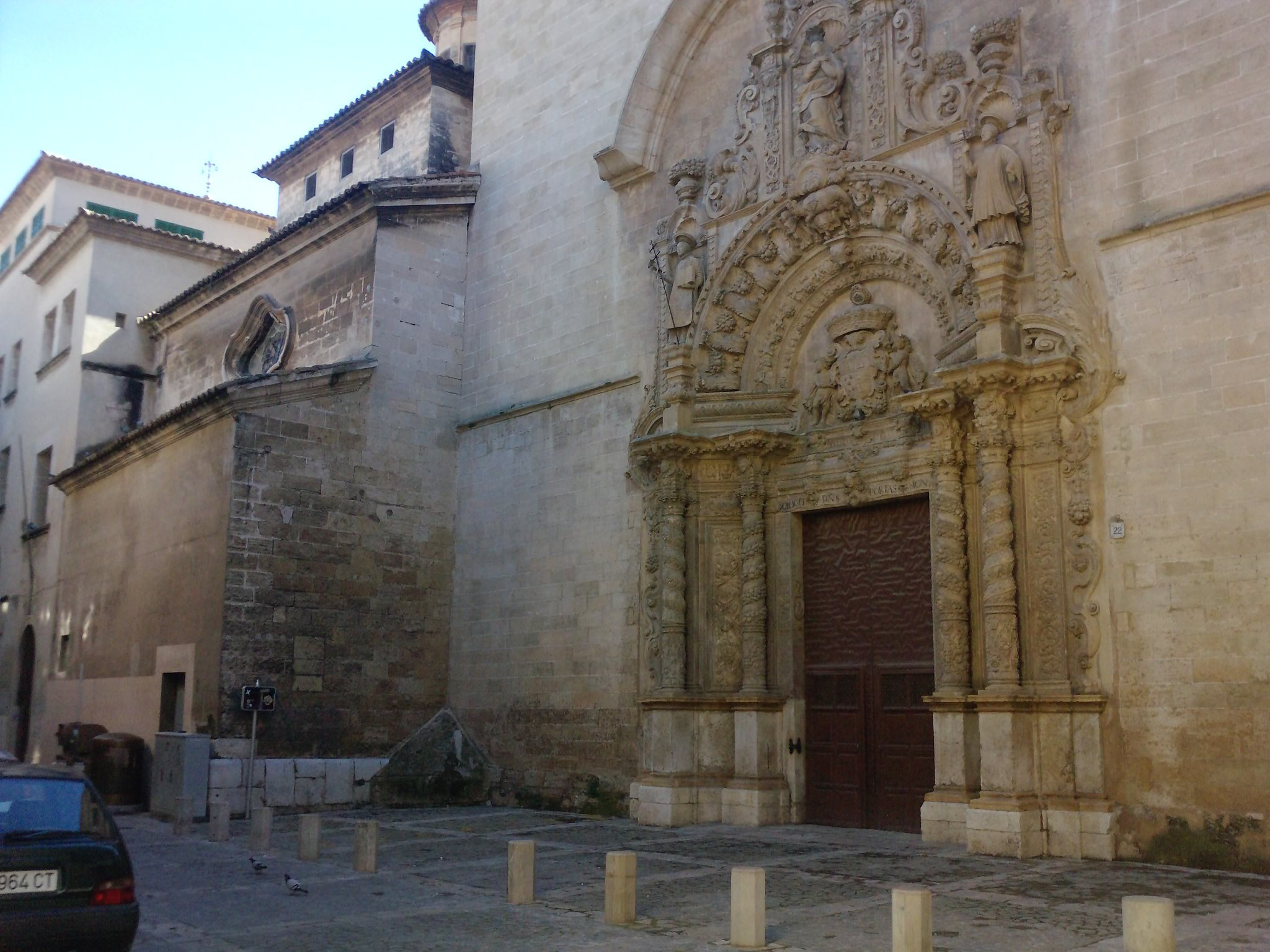
Church of Montesión (Mount Zion) in Palma de Mallorca, the main Church of Xuetas of Mallorca.

The Balearic word xueta derives, according to some experts, from juetó, diminutive of jueu ("Jew") which give xuetó, a term that also still survives. Other authors consider that it may derive from the word xulla (pronounced xuia or xua, which means a type of salted bacon and, by extension, pork) and, according to popular belief, refers to Xuetes who were seen eating pork to show that they did not practice Judaism. But this etymology has also been linked with the tendency, present in various cultures, of using offensive names related to pork to designate Jews and Jewish converts (see, for example Marrano). A third possibility links both putative etymologies; the word xuia may have provoked the replacement of the j of juetó by the x of xuetó, and xueta could have been imposed over xuetó by the greater phonetic resemblance with xuia.

The Xueta have also been called "del Segell" ("of Segell"), after a street on which many lived, or del carrer ("of the street") as a shortened form of "del carrer del Segell"; possibly also by way of Castilian "de la calle", provoked from an approximate phonetic translation of "del call" ("of the Jewish quarter", "of the ghetto"; Catalan call, from Hebrew קָהָל (qāhāl, community, synagogue, means "jewish quarter"), perhaps made by functionaries of the Spanish Inquisition of Castilian origin, in reference to the old Jewish quarter of the city of Palma de Mallorca. In modern times, it relates to the carrer de l'Argenteria or the street of the silversmiths, after a street that defines the neighborhood around the church of Santa Eulàlia where the majority of the Xueta lived, and takes its name from a popular occupation of that group. In some older official documents, the expressions "de gènere hebreorum" ("of Hebrew genus") or "d'estirp hebrea" ("of Hebrew lineage") are used. The Xueta have been referred to simply as jueus ("Jews") or, more frequently, by the Castilianism “judios”.

The Xuetes, aware of the original offensive meaning of the term xuete, have preferred to identify as "del Segell", "del carrer" or, most commonly, with "noltros" or "es nostros" ("we"), opposed to "ets altres" ("the others") or "es de fora del carrer" ("those from outside the street").

== Surnames ==
The Xueta surnames are Aguiló, Bonnin, Cortès, Fortesa, Fuster, Martí, Miró, Picó, Pinya/Piña, Pomar, Segura, Tarongí, Valentí, Fazuati, Valleriola and Valls, as publicly displayed on the convent of Santo Domingo. Picó and Segura are not found among those condemned by the Inquisition, and Valentí, originally the nickname of a family who were then known as Fortesa, is also absent. Many of those surnames are also very common in the general population of Catalan-speaking territories.

The surnames Galiana, Moyà and Sureda figure among the penitents without having been considered Xuetes.

Numerous surnames in Mallorca with clear Jewish origin are present on the island but are not considered to belong to the Xueta community. Examples include Abraham, Amar, Bofill, Bonet, Daviu, Duran, Homar, Jordà, Maimó, Salom, Vidal. Inquisition registers from the late 15th and early 16th centuries documented more than 330 surnames for those persons condemned in Mallorca.

Therefore, Converso origin is not sufficient to be considered Xueta. Although Xuetas are descendants of Conversos, only a fraction of Converso descendants are considered Xuetas.

== Genetics ==
A variety of genetic studies conducted, principally, by the Department of Human Genetics of the University of the Balearic Islands have indicated that the Xuetes constitute a genetically homogeneous group within the populations of Mizrahi Jews and are also related to Ashkenazi Jews and those of North Africa, based on analyzing both the Y chromosome, which traces patrilineal descent, and the mitochondrial DNA, which traces matrilineal descent.

The population is subject to certain pathologies of genetic origin, such as Familial Mediterranean fever, shared with the Sephardi Jews, and a high frequency of iron overload particular to that community.

== Historic antecedents ==
=== The conversos (1391–1488) ===
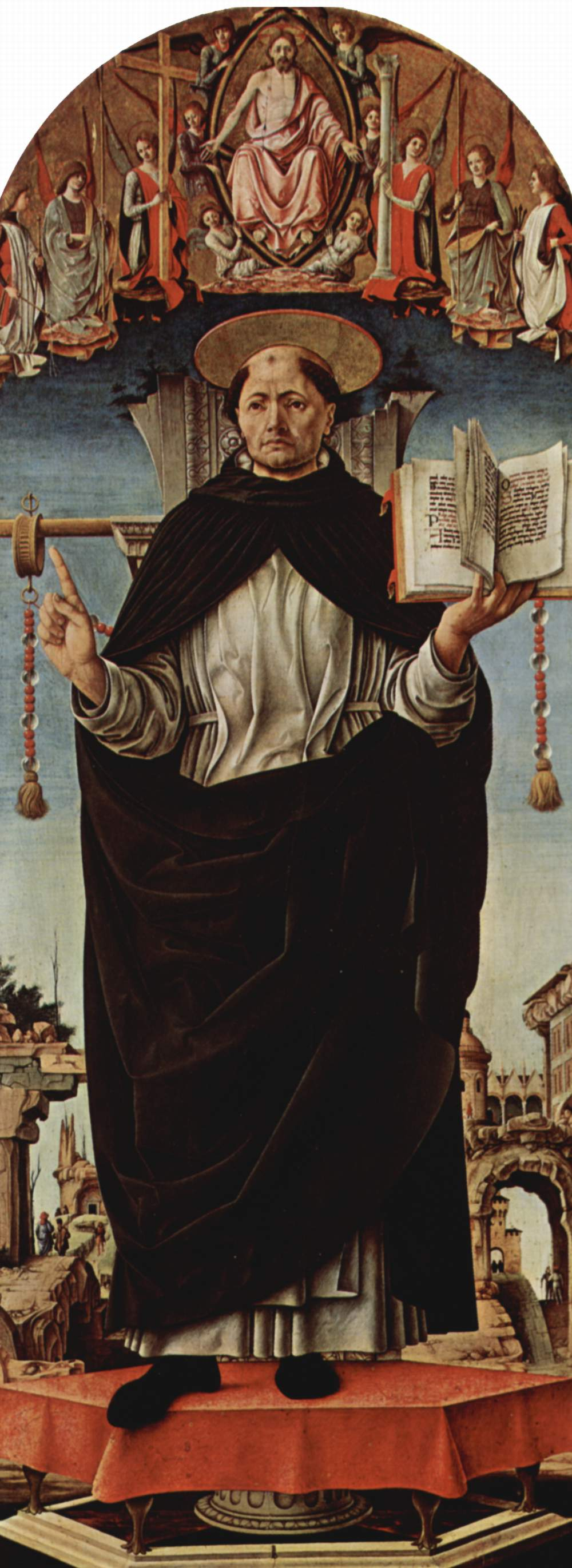
Saint Vicent Ferrer, predicative assets for the conversion of the Jews.

The assault on the calls – the Mallorcan Jewish ghettoes – in 1391, the preaching of Vincent Ferrer in 1413, and the conversion of the remainder of the Jewish community of Mallorca, in 1435, are the three events that led to numerous conversions. The community agreed to mass, rather than individual, conversions to manage a collective peril.

Many of the new Christians continued their traditional communal and religious practices. They established the "Confraria de Sant Miquel" or "dels Conversos" ("The Confraternity of Saint Michael" or "of the Converts"). It largely replaced former Aljama in taking care of the group's social needs, for instance, assistance to the needy, an internal organ of justice, officiating at weddings, and supporting religious cohesion. At the end of the last quarter of the 15th century, the conversos carried on their activities, some of them clandestine, without suffering external pressures. The guilds did not discriminate based on Jewish origin. The conversos managed some social cohesion.

=== The beginnings of the Spanish Inquisition (1488–1544) ===
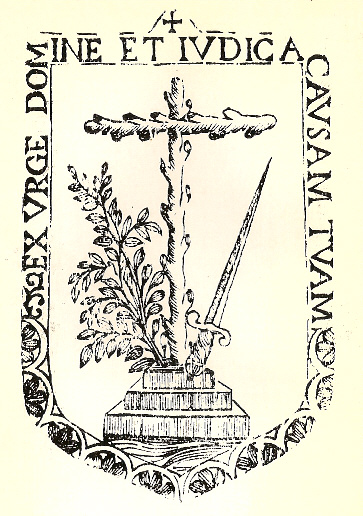
Shield of the Inquisition used in Mallorca.

In 1488, while some of the last converts of 1435 were still alive, the first inquisitors of the Spanish Inquisition – a tribunal newly created by the Catholic Monarchs as part of an effort to forge a nation state on the base of religious uniformity – arrived in Mallorca. The introduction of such a tribunal was followed by public complaints and general opposition in Mallorca, as throughout the rest of the Crown of Aragon, but to no avail. The Inquisition's central objective was the repression of crypto-Judaism, which it began by applying the Edicts of Grace, severely punishing heresy by Christians unless avoided through self-incrimination.

Under the Edicts of Grace (1488–1492), 559 Mallorcans confessed to Jewish practices, and the Inquisition obtained the names of the majority of the Judaizing Mallorcans, who, together with their families and their closest associates, they punished harshly. Subsequently, until 1544, 239 Crypto-Jews were reconciled and 537 were "relaxed" – that is, turned over to the civil authorities to be executed; 82 were executed and burned. The majority of the remaining 455, who managed to flee, were burnt in effigy. This exile was distinct from the decree of expulsion of 1492 from the Crowns of Castile and Aragon; officially no Jews lived in Mallorca by 1435.

=== The new clandestinity (1545–1673) ===
After this period, the Mallorcan Inquisition ceased to act against the judaizers, even though there were signs of prohibited practices; the causes may have been: the participation of the inquisitorial structure in conflicts between local armed factions (bandositats); the appearance of new religious phenomena such as some conversions to Islam and Protestantism, or the control of the morality of the clergy. But, beyond a doubt, also the adoption of more efficacious strategies of protection on the part of the crypto-Jews: the later inquisitorial trials talk about how religious practices were transferred within families when a child reached the age of adolescence and, very often in the case of women, when it became clear whom she would marry and what were the husband's religious convictions.

In any event, this period was characterized by the reduction of the group by means of the flight of the penitents of the earlier epoch, the unconditional adhesion to Catholicism of the majority of those who remained, and the generalization of the statutes of neteja de sang (literally "purity of blood", most commonly referred to in English by the Spanish language expression limpieza de sangre) in the majority of the guild organizations and religious orders. But despite all this, a small group, essentially those who would later be known as the Xuetes, persevered with clandestine Judaism, and maintained social, familial, and economic strategies of internal cohesion.

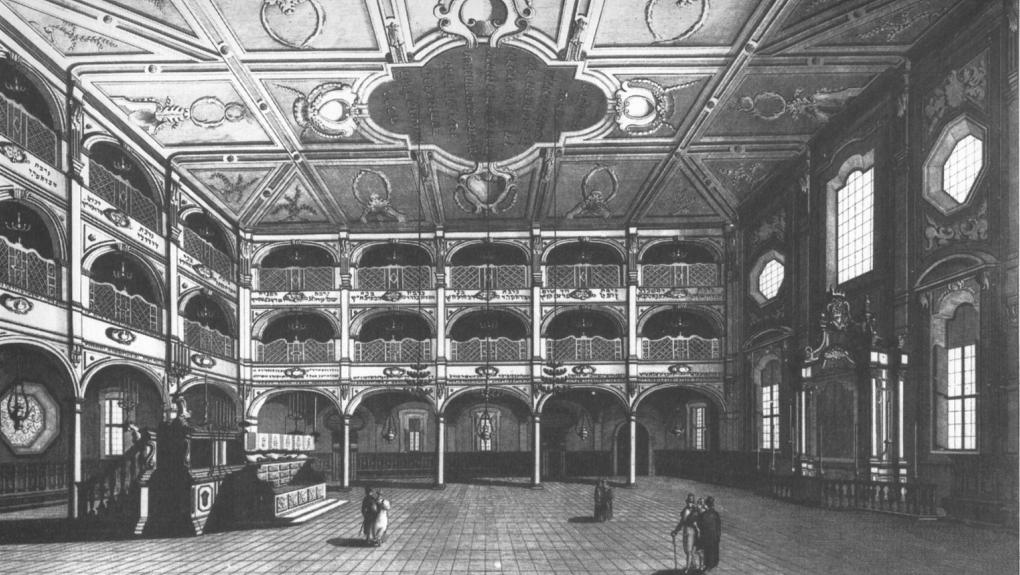
The Old Synagogue of Livorno (built in the 17th century), a city of reference for the Mallorcan crypto-Jews

From 1640, the descendants of the converts began a marked process of economic ascent and increasing commercial influence. Previously, and with some exceptions, they had been artisans, shopkeepers, and retail distributors, but starting from this time and for reasons not well explained, some began to focus strongly on economic activity: they created complex mercantile companies, participated in foreign trade, coming to control, at the time of the end of the inquisitorial trials, 36% of the total, dominating the market for insurance and retail commerce of imported products. Other companies were usually owned by conversos, and they gave part of their profits to works of charity in benefit of the "community", unlike the rest of the population, who made charitable donations to the Church. Because of the intense exterior economic activity, the Xuetes resumed their contact with the international communities of Jews, especially of Livorno, of Rome, of Marseille, and of Amsterdam, through whom the converts had access to Jewish literature. It is known that Rafel Valls, known as "el Rabí" ("the Rabbi") religious leader of the Mallorcan converts, traveled to Alexandria and Smyrna in the era of Sabbatai Zevi, but it is not known whether he had any contact with him.

An internal system of social stratification probably began in that period, although it is also believed to be a remnant of the Jewish (pre-conversion) period. This system distinguished a kind of aristocracy, called "orella alta" (literally "high ears"), from the rest of the group, "orella baixa" ("low ears"). Along with other distinctions based on religion, professions, and parentage this configured a tapestry of alliances and avoidances among surnames, which had a great influence on endogamic practices of the period.

== Origins ==
=== The second persecution (1673–1695) ===
The reasons why the Inquisition returned to act against the judaizing Mallorcans after some 130 years of inactivity, and in an era in which the inquisition was already in decline are not very clear: the preoccupation of decadent economic sectors before the ascent and commercial dynamism of the converts, the resumption of religious practices in community, rather than limited to a domestic context, a new growth of religious zeal, and the judgment against Alonso López could have been influential factors.

==== The precedents ====
In July 1672, a merchant informed the Inquisition that some Jews of Livorno had made inquiries about the Jews of Mallorca with the names "Forteses, Aguilons, Martins, Tarongins, Cortesos, Picons".

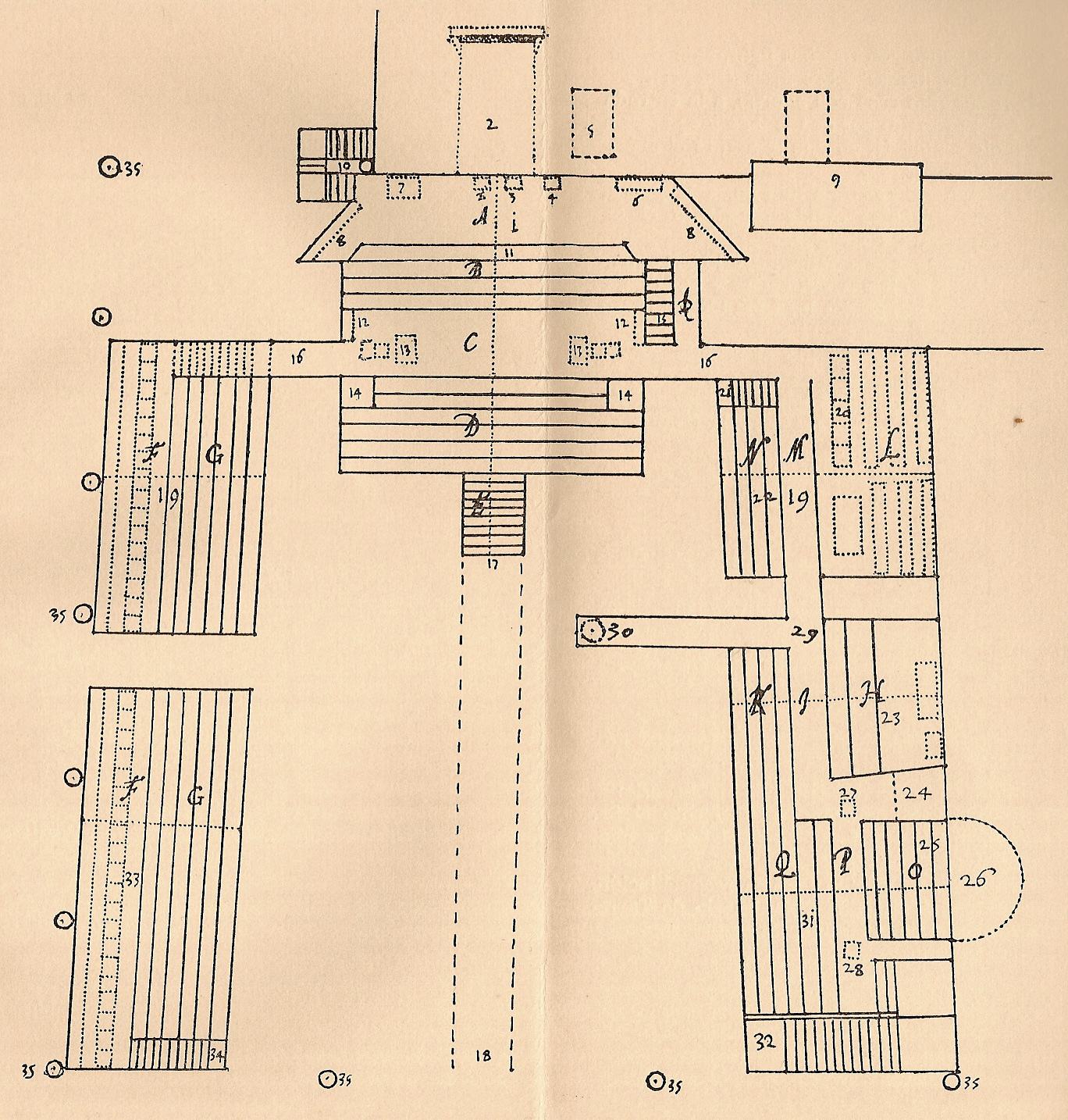
Map of the banquet of the act of faith of 1675 in Mallorca

In 1673, a ship with a group of Jews expelled from Oran by the Spanish Crown and headed for Livorno, called in at Palma. The Inquisition arrested a youth of some 17 years named Isaac López. López had been born in Madrid and baptized with the name Alonso, and as a small boy fled to the Berber lands with his converso parents. Alonso refused to renounce Judaism and was burnt alive in 1675. His execution provoked a great commotion among the "judaizers". At the same time he was also the object of great admiration for his persistence and courage.

The same year López was arrested, some servants of the conversos informed their confessor that they had spied upon their masters and observed them participating in Jewish ceremonies.

In 1674, the prosecutor of the Mallorca tribunal sent a report to the Supreme Inquisition in which he accused the Mallorcan crypto-Jews of 33 charges, among them their refusal to marry "cristianos de natura" ("natural Christians") and their social rejection of those who did so; the practice of secrecy; the giving of Old Testament names to their children; the identification with their tribe of origin, and the arrangement of marriages as a function of that fact; the exclusion in their homes of the iconography of the New Testament and the presence of those of the Old; contempt for and insults toward Christians; exercising professions related to weights and measures in order to trick Christians; holding positions in the Church in order to mock them later with impunity; applying their own legal system; taking up collections for their own poor; financing a synagogue in Rome, where they had a representative; holding clandestine meetings; complying with Jewish dietary practices, including those of animal sacrifice and of fast days; the observance of the Jewish Sabbath; and avoidance of Last Rites at the time of death.

==== Conspiracism ====
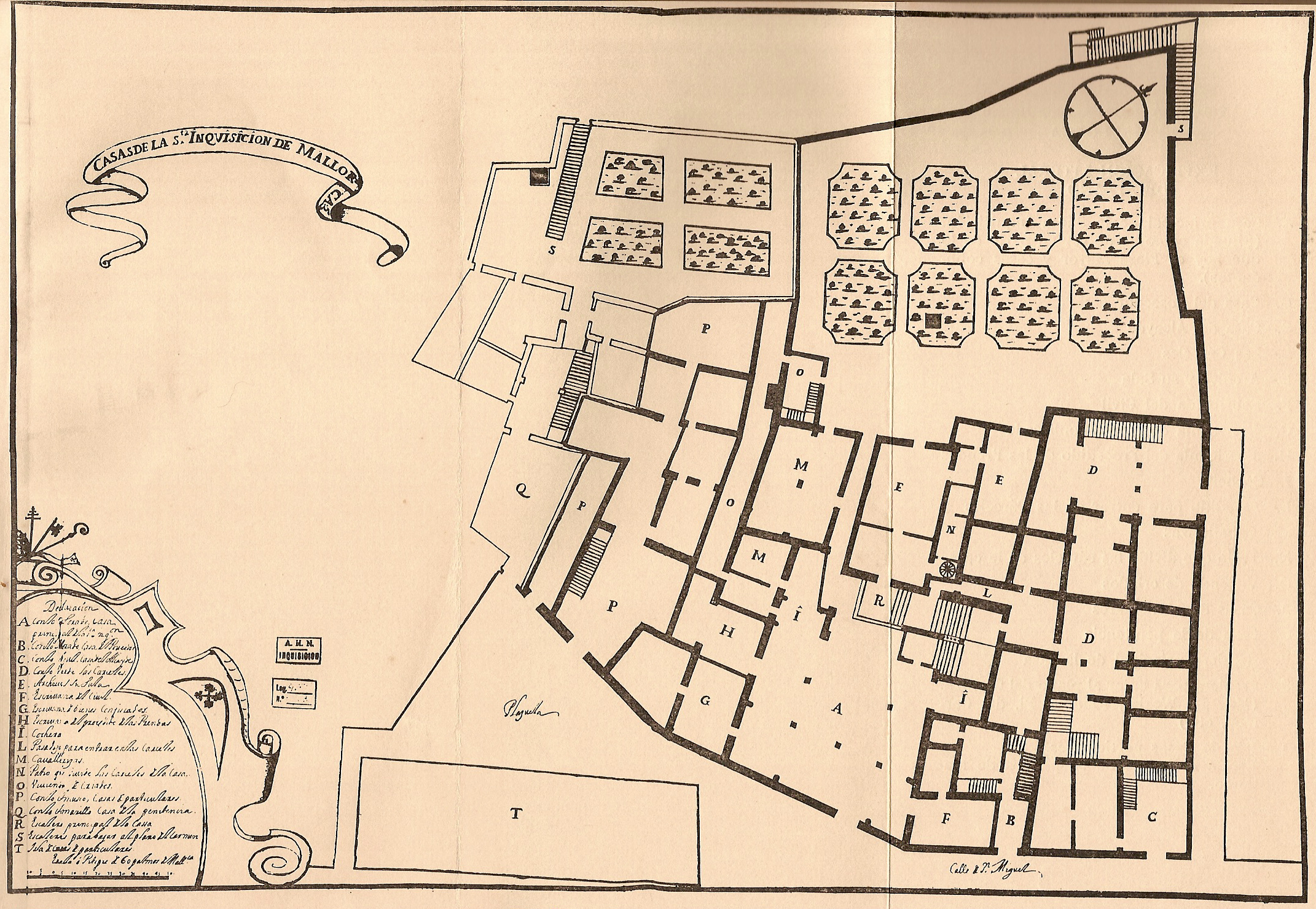
Map of the headquarters of the Inquisition of Mallorca, built in charge to the confiscation of the convicted persons in 1678

Four years later, in 1677, the Supreme Inquisition ordered the Mallorcan Inquisition to act on the case of the confession of the servants. According to the servants, the observants, as they called themselves, in reference to the Torah, met in a garden in Palma where they observed Yom Kippur. This led to the detention of some of the leaders of the Crypto-Jewish community of Mallorca, Pere Onofre Cortès (also known as Moixina), master of one of the servants and proprietor of the garden, along with five other people. From that point on, they proceeded to arrest 237 individuals in the course of a single year.

Helped by corrupt functionaries, the accused were able to arrange to only provide limited information in their own confessions and to denounce as few of their co-religionists as possible. All of the accused solicited the opportunity to return to the Church, and were reconciled.

Part of the penalty consisted of the confiscation of all of the goods of the condemned, which were valued at two million Mallorcan lliura which, according to the usual procedures of the inquisition, had to be paid in actual currency. This constituted an exorbitant quantity for the era and, according to a protest of the Gran i General Consell, there was not this much hard cash on the entire island.

Finally, in the spring of 1679, five autos-da-fé took place, the first of which was preceded by the demolition of the building in the garden and the salting the earth where the conversos met. Before an expectant multitude, condemnation was pronounced against 221 conversos. Afterward, those who were condemned to prison were transported to serve out their sentences in new prisons erected by the Inquisition, and had their goods confiscated.

==== The Cremadissa (mass burning) ====
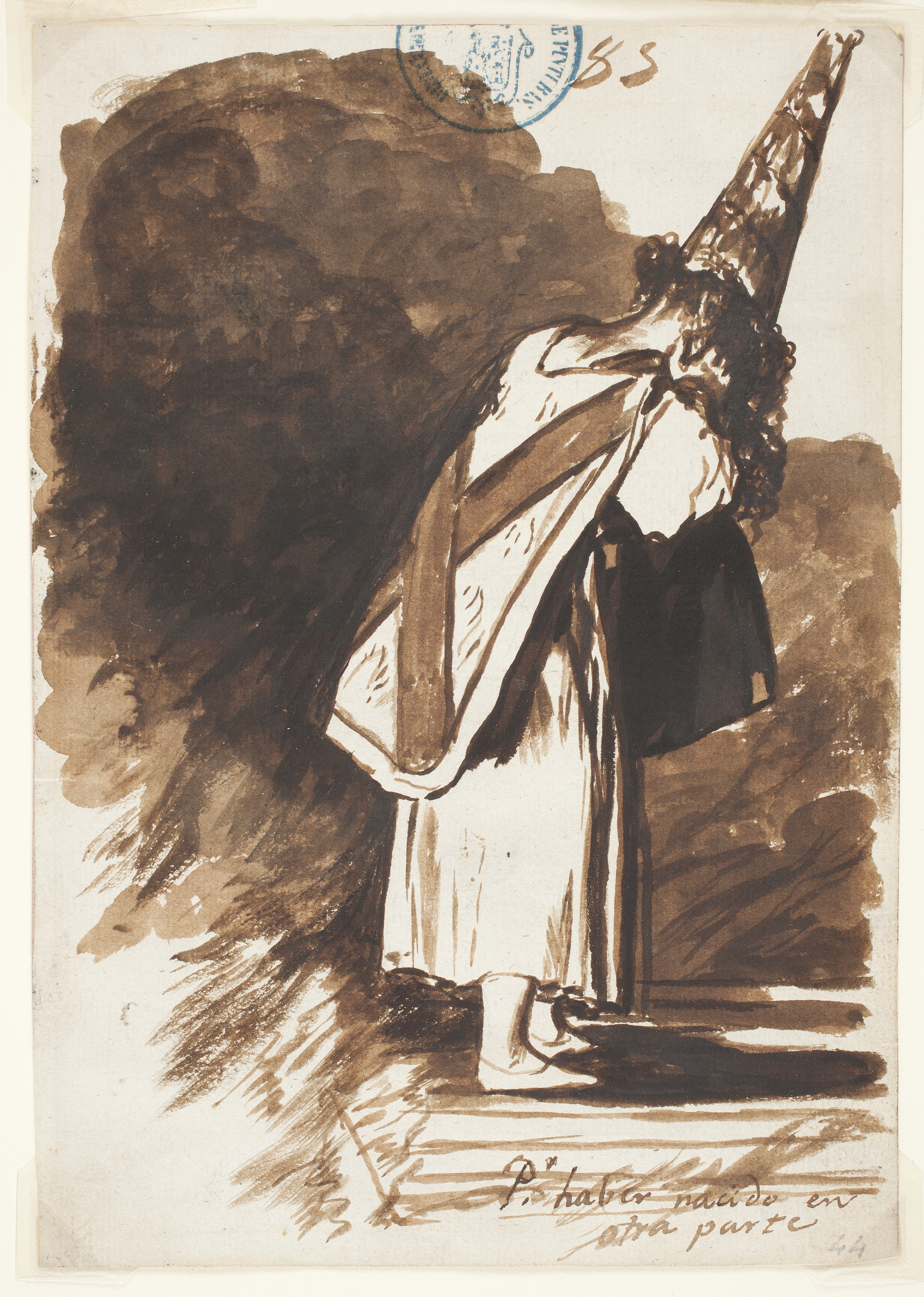
Inquisition condemned (Francisco de Goya)

Once the jail penalties were served, a great part of those who persisted in the Jewish faith, whose clandestine practices were noticed, harassed by inquisitorial vigilance and vexed by a society they considered responsible for the economic crisis provoked by the confiscations, decided to gradually flee the island in small groups.

In the middle of this process, an anecdotal event precipitated a new wave of inquisitions. Rafel Cortès (also known as cap loco, 'crazy head') had remarried, this time to a woman with a converso surname, Miró, but who was Catholic. His family did not congratulate him on getting married and censured him for having married someone not of Jewish ancestry. Hurt in his pride, he denounced some of their coreligionists before the Inquisition of maintaining the prohibited faith. Suspecting that he had made a general denunciation, they agreed upon a mass escape. On 7 March 1688, a large group of converts embarked clandestinely on an English vessel, but unexpected rough weather prevented them from leaving, and at daybreak they returned to their houses. The Inquisition was notified of this, and all of the group was arrested.

The trials lasted three years and the cohesion of the group was weakened by a strict regime of isolation, which prevented any joint action, together with a perception of religious defeat due to the impossibility of escape. In 1691, the Inquisition, in three autos de fe, condemned 73 people, of whom 45 were turned over to the civil authorities to be burnt, 5 burnt in effigy; 3 already deceased had their bones burned, 37 were effectively punished; of these, three – Rafel Valls and the siblings Rafel Benet and Caterina Tarongí – were burned alive. 30,000 people attended.

The sentences dictated by the Inquisition included other penalties that were to be maintained for at least two generations: those in the household of the condemned, as well as their children and grandchildren, could not hold public offices, be ordained as priests, marry persons other than Xuetes, carry jewelry or ride a horse. These last two penalties do not appear to have been carried out, although the others continued in effect by the force of custom, beyond the two generations stipulated.

==== The final trials ====
The Inquisition opened, and eventually closed, several trials of individuals denounced by the accused of the autos de fe of 1691, the majority dead. A single auto de fe was brought in 1695 against 11 dead people and one living woman (who was reconciled). Also, in the 18th century, the Inquisition carried out two individual trials: in 1718, Rafel Pinya spontaneously inculpated himself and was reconciled, and in 1720, Gabriel Cortès (also known as Morrofés) fled to Alexandria and returned formally to Judaism; he was burnt in effigy as the last person condemned to death by the Mallorcan Inquisition. There is no doubt that these last cases are anecdotal; with the trials of 1691 came the end of the crypto-Jewry of Mallorca. The effect of the escape of the leaders, the devastation of the mass burnings, and the generalized fear made it impossible to sustain the ancestral faith. It is after these events that we can begin to actually speak of the Xuetes.

=== Anti-Xueta propaganda ===
==== Faith Triumphant ====
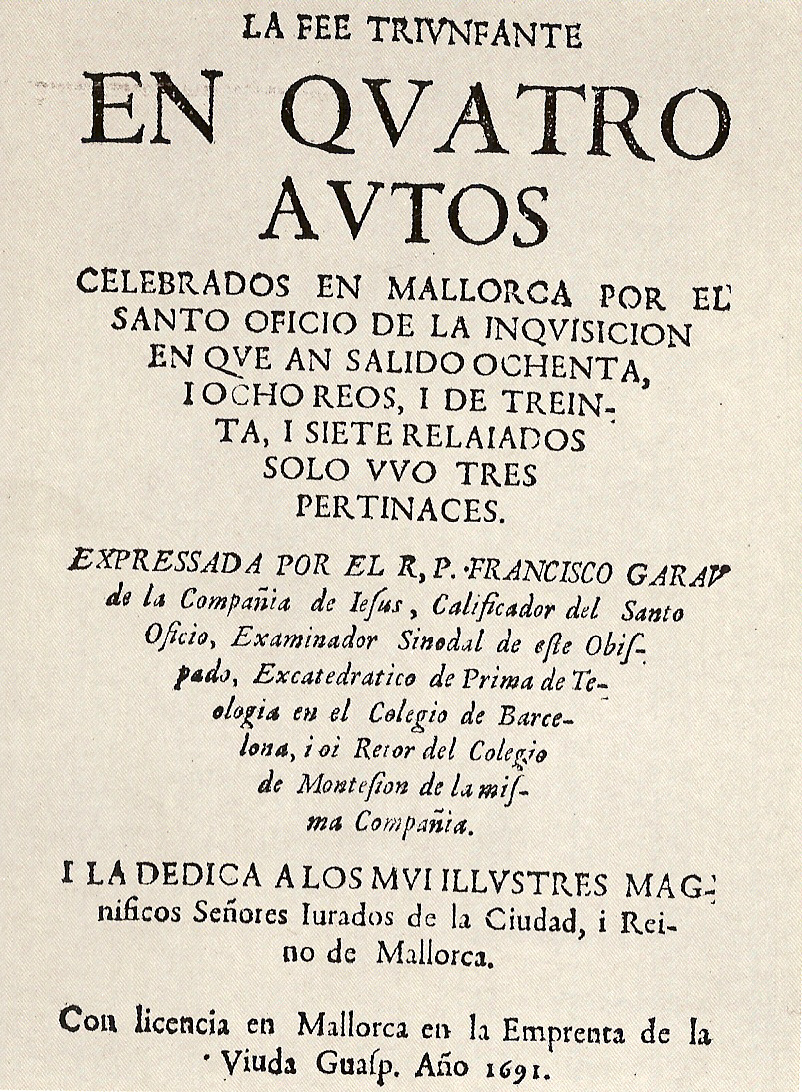
First edition of La Fe Triunfante by Francesc Garau (1691)

The same year as the autos de fe of 1691, Francesc Garau, Jesuit, theologian and active participant in the inquisitorial trials, published la Fee Triunfante en quatro autos celebrados en Mallorca por el Santo Oficio de la Inquisición en que an salido ochenta i ocho reos, i de treinta, i siete relaiados solo uvo tres pertinaces (Faith Triumphant in four acts celebrated in Mallorca by the Holy Office of the Inquisition in which tried eighty-eight defendants, and of thirty-seven turned over to civil authorities only three remained stubborn). Apart from its importance as a documentary and historical source, the book was intended to perpetuate the record and the infamy of the converts, and it contributed notably to provide an ideological basis for the segregation of the Xuetes and to perpetuate it. It was republished in 1755, used in the argumentation to limit the civil rights of the Xuetes and served as the basis of the libel of 1857, La Sinagoga Balear o historia de los judios mallorquines (The Balearic Synagogue or the history of the Mallorcan Jews). In the 20th century, there have been abundant republications, all with an intention contrary to that of its author, given that some passages were of scandalous crudity, and lack the most elementary sensibility.

==== Les gramalletes ====
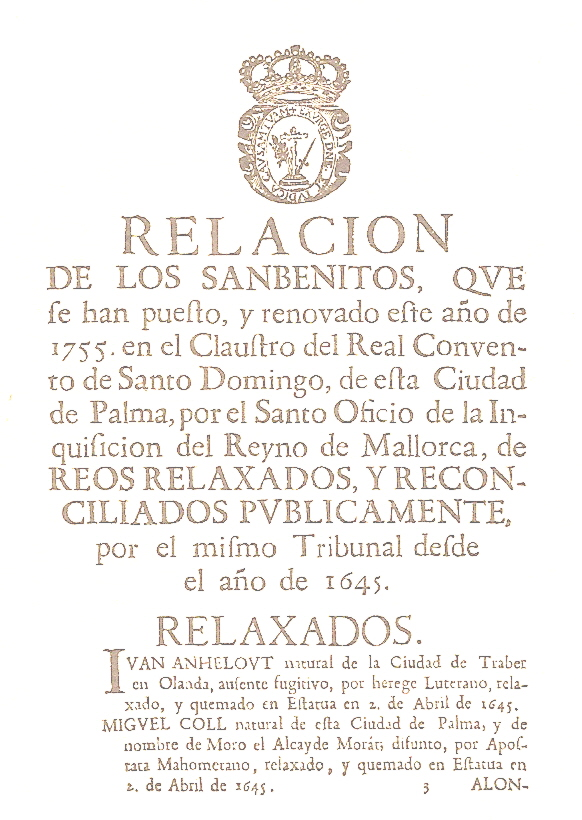
Title page of the Relación de Sanbenitos ... de Palma, 1755

The gramalleta or sambenet (Spanish: sanbenito) was a tunic that individuals condemned by the Inquisition were forced to wear as punishment. The decorations on the gramalleta indicated what crime its bearer had committed and the punishment imposed. Once the autos-da-fé were over, a painting was created of the convicted heretic wearing the gramalleta and the name of its bearer was included in the painting. In the case of Mallorca, these were exhibited publicly in the cloister of St. Domingo to perpetuate and exemplify the record of the verdict.

Because of the deterioration of this public display, the Supreme Inquisition ordered its renovation on several occasions in the 17th century. The matter led to conflict because of the presence of a great number of lineages, some of which coincided with those of the nobility, but finally in 1755 the order was carried out, surely because it was now restricted to the renovation of sambenets after 1645, and that the lineages thus implicated in Judaic practices were limited strictly to Xuetes, not the broader range of people prosecuted at an earlier date. The sambenets were to remain exposed until 1820, when a group of Xuetes assaulted and burned St. Domingo.

In the same year, 1755, in which Faith Triumphant was republished, another work was published as well, the Relación de los sanbenitos que se han puesto, y renovado este año de 1755, en el Claustro del Real Convento de Santo Domingo, de esta Ciudad de Palma, por el Santo Oficio de la Inquisición del Reyno de Mallorca, de reos relaxados, y reconciliados publicamente por el mismo tribunal desde el año de 1645 (The relation of the sanbenitos that have been placed, and renovated this year of 1755, in the cloister of the royal convent of Santo Domingo, of this city of Palma, by the Holy Office of the Inquisition of the Kingdom of Majorca, of defendants relaxados, and reconciled publicly by the same tribunal from the year 1645), to insist on the necessity of not forgetting, despite the active opposition of those affected.

== The Xueta community ==
The attitude of the Inquisition, which intended to force the disappearance of the Jews by means of their forcible integration into the Christian community, in fact accomplished the opposite: it perpetuated the memory of the condemned and, by extension, of all who carried the infamous lineages, even if they were not relatives and even if they were sincere Christians, and helped create a community that, although it no longer contained Judaic element, was still obliged to maintain a strong cohesion. In contrast, the descendants of the island's other crypto-Jews, those who were not so brought to the public view, lost all notion of their origins.

But, soon after, the Xuetes regained the leading role that they had before the inquisitorial trials. Now, deprived of their religious network, and their fortunes having been requisitioned, they sought to protect commercial alliances with the nobility and the clergy, even with the functionaries of the Inquisition. The renewed energy and the political alliances achieved permitted them to fight actively for equal rights, adjusting to whatever the surrounding circumstances were.

=== The War of the Spanish Succession (1705–1715) ===
As with the rest of the island's population during the War of the Spanish Succession, amongst Xuetes there were both maulets – supporters of the Habsburg Charles VI, Holy Roman Emperor and botiflers – supporters of the Bourbon Philip V of Spain. Some of the latter perceived the French dynasty as a modernizing element in terms of religion and society, since Bourbon France had never exhibited an attitude of repression and discrimination comparable to the Habsburg rule in Spain, renewed – in the case of Mallorca – with Charles II.

Thus, a group of Xuetes, led by Gaspar Pinya, clothing dealer and importer, supplier of the botifler nobility, was very active supporting Philip's cause. In 1711, a conspiracy financed by Pinya was discovered. He was sentenced to jail and his properties seized but, as the war ended with a Bourbon victory, he was rewarded with rights associated to the lesser nobility; this did not affect the rest of the community.

=== The republication of Faith Triumphant (1755) ===
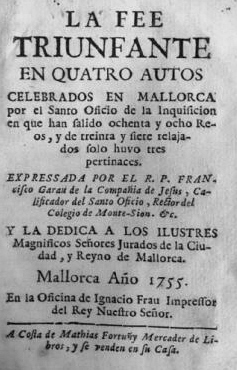
Title page of the second edition of La Fee triunfante... 1755.

The tailor Rafel Cortes, Tomàs Forteza, and the hunchback Jeroni Cortès, among others, raised a request to the Real Audiencia de Mallorca (Royal Mallorcan High Court, the island's highest court) aiming to prevent the republication of Faith Triumphant in 1755, which was accepted and so the book's distribution prevented for a time. Eventually, the Inquisitors allowed distribution to be resumed.

=== The deputies of the Carrer (1773–1788) ===
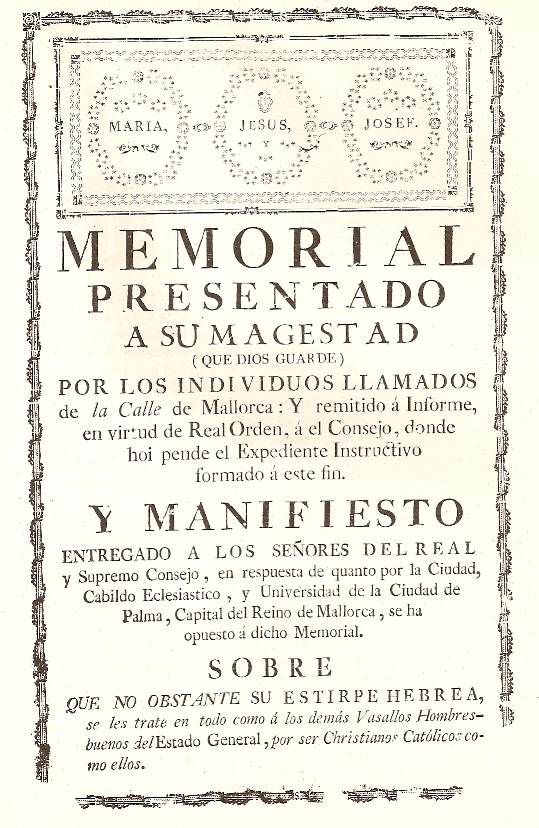
Allegation in defence of the rights of the xuetes in front of the court of Charles III.

In 1773, the Xuetes designated a group of six deputies – popularly known by the name of perruques (the wigs) because of the luxurious adornment they used during their lobbying – in order to address King Charles III to make a claim for outright social and juridical equality with other Mallorcans. In this regard, the Court decided to inquire of the Mallorcan institutions, which frontally and decidedly opposed the pretensions of the descendants of the conversos. A lengthy and costly trial followed, in which the parties passionately stated their cases. The documents used in this trial demonstrate the extent to which discrimination was alive and had deep ideological roots; conversely, they are also a proof of the perseverance of the Xuetes in their demands for equality.

In October 1782, the prosecutor of the Real Audiencia de Mallorca, despite being aware of the result of these deliberations favorable to the Xuetes, raised a memorandum including highly racist reasoning, proposing the suspension of the accord and the exile of the Xuetes to Menorca and to Cabrera, where they would be confined with strong restrictions on their liberty.

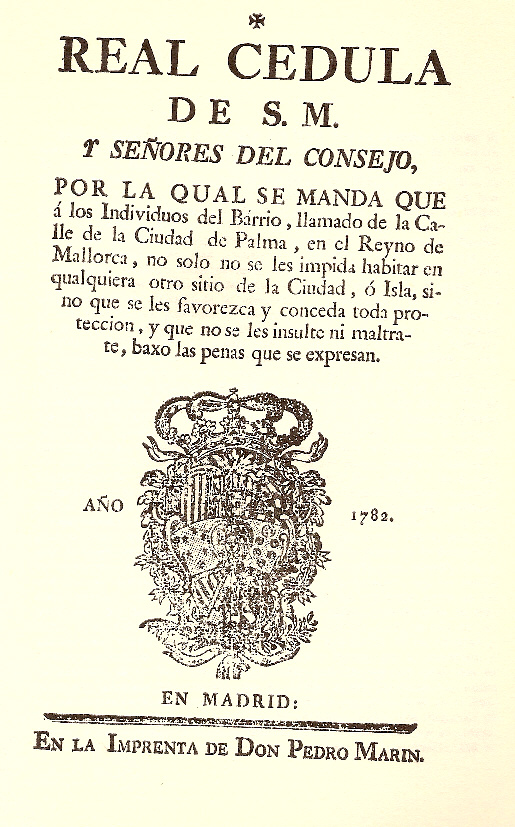
First of the three royal decrees signed for Charles III (1782)

Finally, the king inclined, timidly, in favor of the Xuetes: on 29 November 1782 he signed the Real Cédula (Royal Decree) that decreed liberty of movement and residency, the elimination of all architectural elements that distinguished the Segell district, and the prohibition of insults, mistreatment, and the use of denigrating expressions. Also, with reservations, the king showed himself to be favorable to the establishment of outright professional liberty and the participation of the Xuetes in the navy and army, but gave instructions that these dispositions would not take effect until some time had passed in order to allow the controversy to ease.

Before half a year had passed, the deputies insisted again on Xuetes gaining access to whatever occupation they sought, and reported that the insults and discrimination had not stopped. The deputies also complained about the exhibition of the sambenets at St. Domingo. The king designated a panel to study the problem; the panel proposed the withdrawal of the sambenets; the prohibition of Faith Triumphant; the dispersion throughout the city, if necessary by force, of the Xuetes and the elimination of all formal mechanisms of mutual assistance among them; access without restriction to all ecclesiastical, university and military positions; the abolition of the guilds; and the suppression of the statutes of "purity of blood", and, if this were not possible, to limit these to 100 years; these last two were proposed to be applied throughout the kingdom.

Then began a new period of consultations and a new trial, which generated in October 1785 a second Cédula Real, which largely ignored the panel's proposal, and was limited to allowing access to the army and the civil administration. Finally, in 1788, a final disposition established simple equality in the exercise of whatever office, but still without a word about the university nor ecclesiastical positions. That same year, the Court and the General Inquisition took action intended to withdraw the sambenets from the cloister, but without result.

Probably the most palpable effect of the Cédulas Reales was the slow disarticulation of the Segell community (el Carrer). Instead, there came to be small nuclei of Xuetes among the majority of the population and, timidly, some began to establish themselves in other streets and neighbourhoods. For those remaining at Segell, the same attitudes of social discrimination, matrimonial endogamy and traditional professions were kept but, in any case, segregation was overt and public in the world of education and religion, bastions untouched by the reforms of Charles III.

=== The end of the Old Regime (1812–1868) ===
Mallorca was not occupied during the Napoleonic invasion and, in contrast to the liberalism that dominated the new Spanish Constitution of 1812, the island became a refuge for those whose ideology was most intransigent and favorable to the Old Regime. In this context, in 1808, soldiers who had been mobilized to go to the front accused the Xuetes of being responsible for their mobilization, and assaulted the Segell district.

The 1812 Constitution, in effect through 1814, abolished the Inquisition and established the full civil equality that the Xuetes had long sought; consequently, the most active Xuetes joined the liberal cause. In 1820, when the Constitution was restored, a group of Xuetes attacked the headquarters of the Inquisition and the Santo Domingo monastery, burning the archives and the sambenets. In turn, when the Constitution was again abolished in 1823, the Carrer was again raided and the shops looted. Such episodes were frequent during this period, as were similar incidents elsewhere on the island, with riots taking place in Felanitx, Llucmajor, Pollença, Sóller, and Campos.

In 1836, Onofre Cortès was appointed councilor of the Palma town hall; it was the first time since the 16th century that a Xueta had occupied a public office at such a level. Since then, it has been a regular occurrence that a Xueta holds a public office in the townhall and the Diputación Provincial.

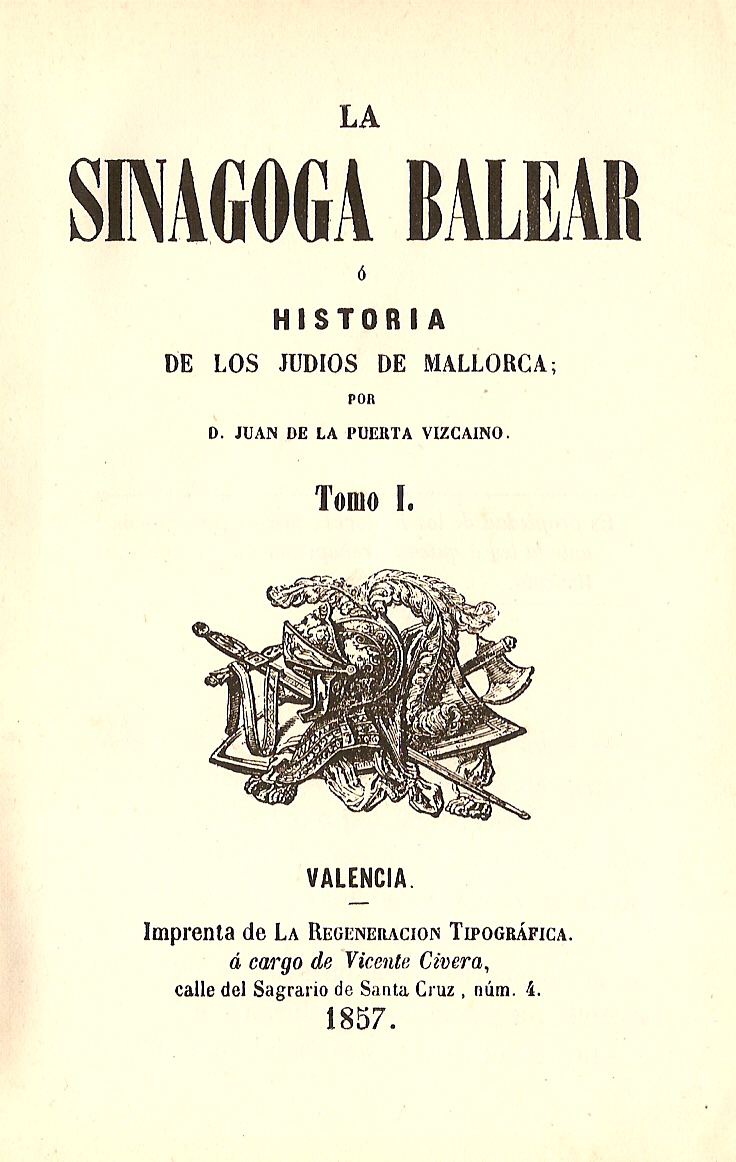
Interior title page of La Sinagoga Balear

In 1857, La sinagoga balear o historia de los judios de Mallorca (The Balearic synagogue or the history of the Jews of Mallorca) was published and signed by Juan de la Puerta Vizcaino. A good part of this book reproduced Faith Triumphant and would be replicated a year later with the work Un milagro y una mentira. Vindicación de los mallorquines cristianos de estirpe hebrea (A miracle and a lie. Vindication of the Mallorcan Christians of Hebrew lineage).

Although the ideological duality within the Xueta community can be traced back to a time prior to the inquisitorial trials, it was in this context of violent sudden changes that it became clear that one faction, clearly a minority, yet influential, was declaredly liberal, later republican, and moderately anticlerical, fighting for the liquidation of all traces of discrimination; and another, probably the majority, yet almost imperceptible in historical records, was ideologically conservative, fervently religious, and wanted to go as unnoticed as possible. At root, both strategies wished to attain the same goal: the disappearance of the Xueta issue, although they wanted to resolve it in different ways: one by making the injustice visible and the other by blending into the surrounding society.

Coinciding with these progressive periods, the Xuetes formed social clubs and associations of mutual aid; it is also during this time that they gained positions in political institutions via the liberal parties.

=== From the First Republic to the Second Republic (1869–1936) ===
Once they could, some well-off families gave their children a high degree of intellectual education and played an important part in the artistic movements of the period. Xuetes took a leading role in the Renaixença (the revival of Catalan culture), in the defense of the Catalan language and in the recuperation of the Floral Games (Catalan/Balear literary competitions). A forerunner of this revival was Tomàs Aguiló i Cortès at the beginning of the 19th century, and some prominent successors were Tomàs Aguiló i Forteza, Marian Aguiló i Fuster, Tomàs Forteza i Cortès, and Ramón Picó i Campamar.

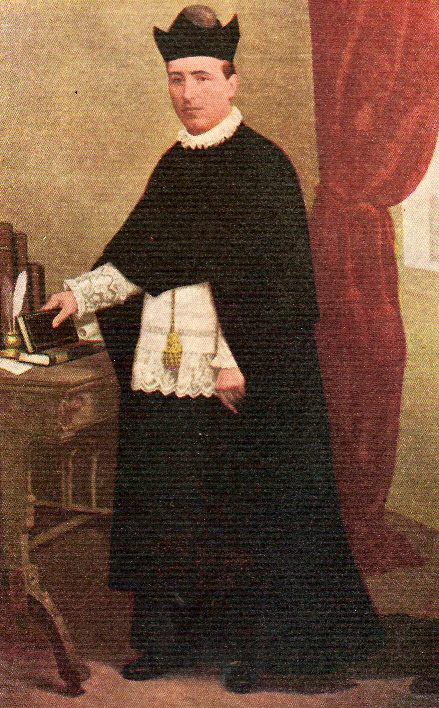
Josep Tarongí Cortès (1847–1890)

Josep Tarongí (1847–1890), priest and writer, encountered difficulties in studying and graduating, but was ultimately ordained; because of his Xueta extraction, he obtained a position outside Mallorca. He was the protagonist of the greatest 19th century polemic on the Xueta question: when he was forbidden in 1876 to preach at the church of St. Miquel, this began a polemic with Miquel Maura (also a priest), brother of the politician Antonio Maura, in which many other parties participated, and which had a great impact both on and off of the island.

Between January and October 1923, the Xueta urbanist and politician Guillem Forteza Pinya was mayor of Palma. Also, between 1927 and 1930, during the dictatorship of Primo de Rivera, that office was held by Joan Aguiló Valentí and Rafel Ignaci Cortès Aguiló.

The brief period of the Second Spanish Republic was also important both because of the official laicism and because a good number of the Xuetes sympathized with the new model of the state, much as their forebears had sympathized with the ideas of the Enlightenment and the liberals. During the Republic, for the first time a Xueta priest preached a sermon at the cathedral of Palma; this had great symbolic importance.

=== From the Spanish Civil War to present times (1936–present) ===
During the Spanish Civil War, Mallorca was ruled by Fascist Italy in alliance with the Spanish Nationalist side. Nazi authorities requested lists of persons with Jewish ancestry, planning to deport them to camps as in France and Italy but the intervention of the bishop of Mallorca Josep Miralles blocked their delivery. The mixing of German and Italian troops with locals led some Palma women intending to marry foreign soldiers to obtain from the mayor Mateo Zaforteza Musoles certificates of not having Jewish ancestry. While Nazi Germany had the Nuremberg Laws and Fascist Italy the Provvedimenti per la difesa della razza italiana, such procedures were not known in Spain since the 19th century.

Anti-Xueta prejudice continued to diminish with the opening of the island to tourism in the first decades of the 20th century, along with economic development which started by the end of the previous century. The presence—in many cases, the permanent residency—of outsiders on the island (Spaniards or foreigners) to whom the status of the Xuetes meant nothing marked a definite point of inflection in the history of this community.

Also, in 1966, the publication of the book Els descendents dels Jueus Conversos de Mallorca. Quatre mots de la veritat (The descendants of the converted Jews of Mallorca. Four words of truth), by Miguel Forteza Piña, brother of mayor Guillem, which made public the research of Baruch Braunstein at the National Historical Archive in Madrid (published in the United States in the 1930s) regarding inquisitorial archives that demonstrated that in Mallorca those condemned for judaizing affected more than 200 Mallorcan surnames; this raised the last popular controversy over the Xueta question. It was in this moment when discriminatory attitudes ended up marginalized in the private dimension and their public expression virtually disappeared.

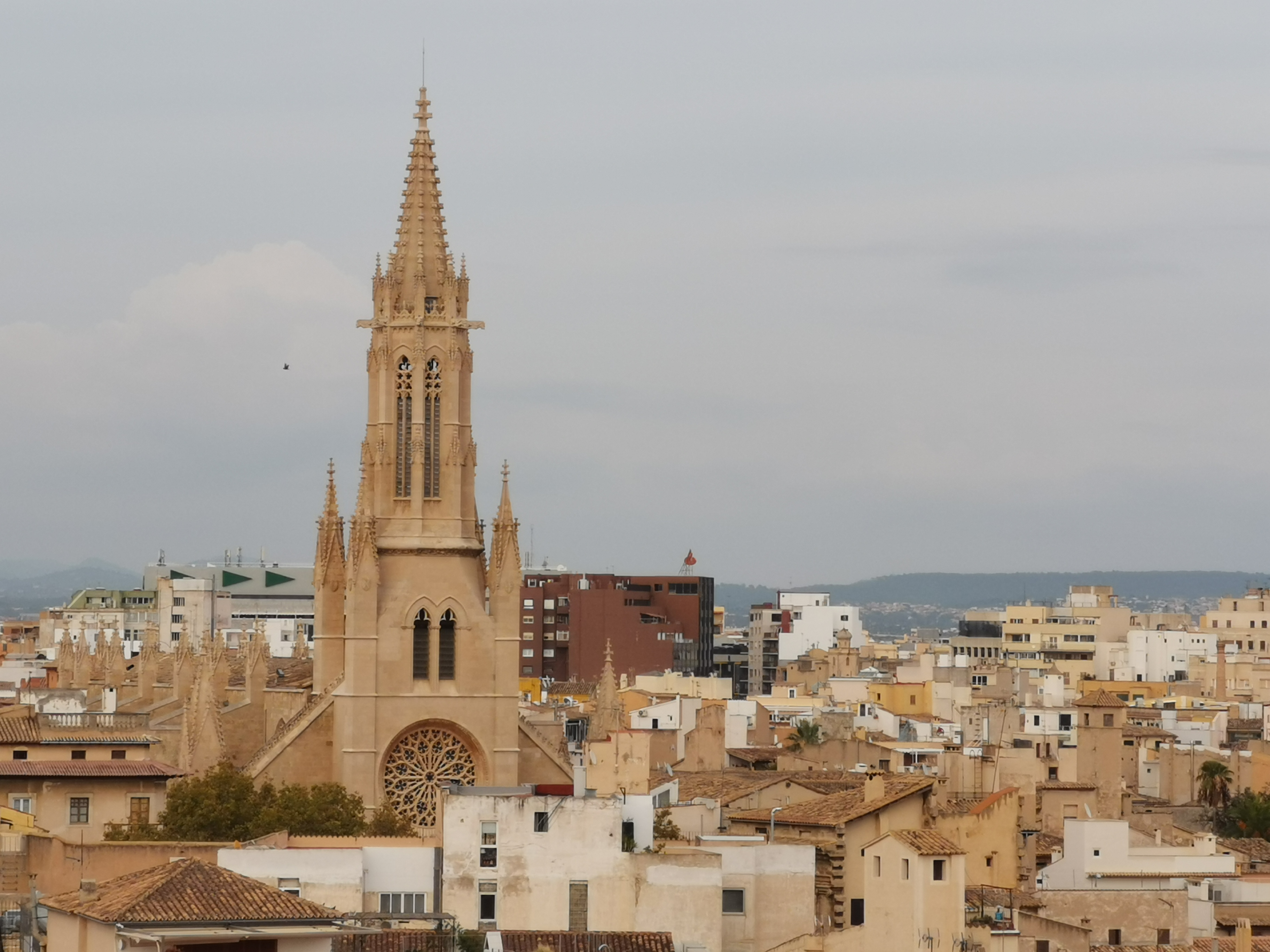
The Church of Saint Eulalia in Palma de Mallorca has been used by the families of Jewish converts (Xuetas).

Freedom of religion, while restricted to private practice of religion only, was legally introduced at the end of the Franco era. This made it possible for some of the Xuetes to reestablish contact with Judaism. It was also enhanced during the 1960s in some revivalist movements which did not go further than the case of Nicolau Aguiló, who in 1977 emigrated to Israel and returned to Judaism with the name Nissan Ben-Avraham, later obtaining the title of rabbi. In any case, Judaism and the Xuetes have had a relation of a certain ambivalence in that dealing with Jews who have adhered to a Christian tradition had been a matter not contemplated by the political and religious authorities of Israel. They seem to give importance to the fact of the Xuetes being "of Christian tradition", while for those Xuetes interested in some form of drawing closer to world Jewry, their differentiated existence is explained only by the fact of their being "Jews". Perhaps this duality explains the existence of a syncretic Judæo-Christian cult called Xueta Christianity, although very much a minority, preached by Cayetano Martí Valls. Traditionally, the church of Saint Eulalia and the church of Montesión (Mount Zion) in Palma de Mallorca have been used by the families of Jewish converts (Xuetas), and both are the centers of Xueta religious ritual life.

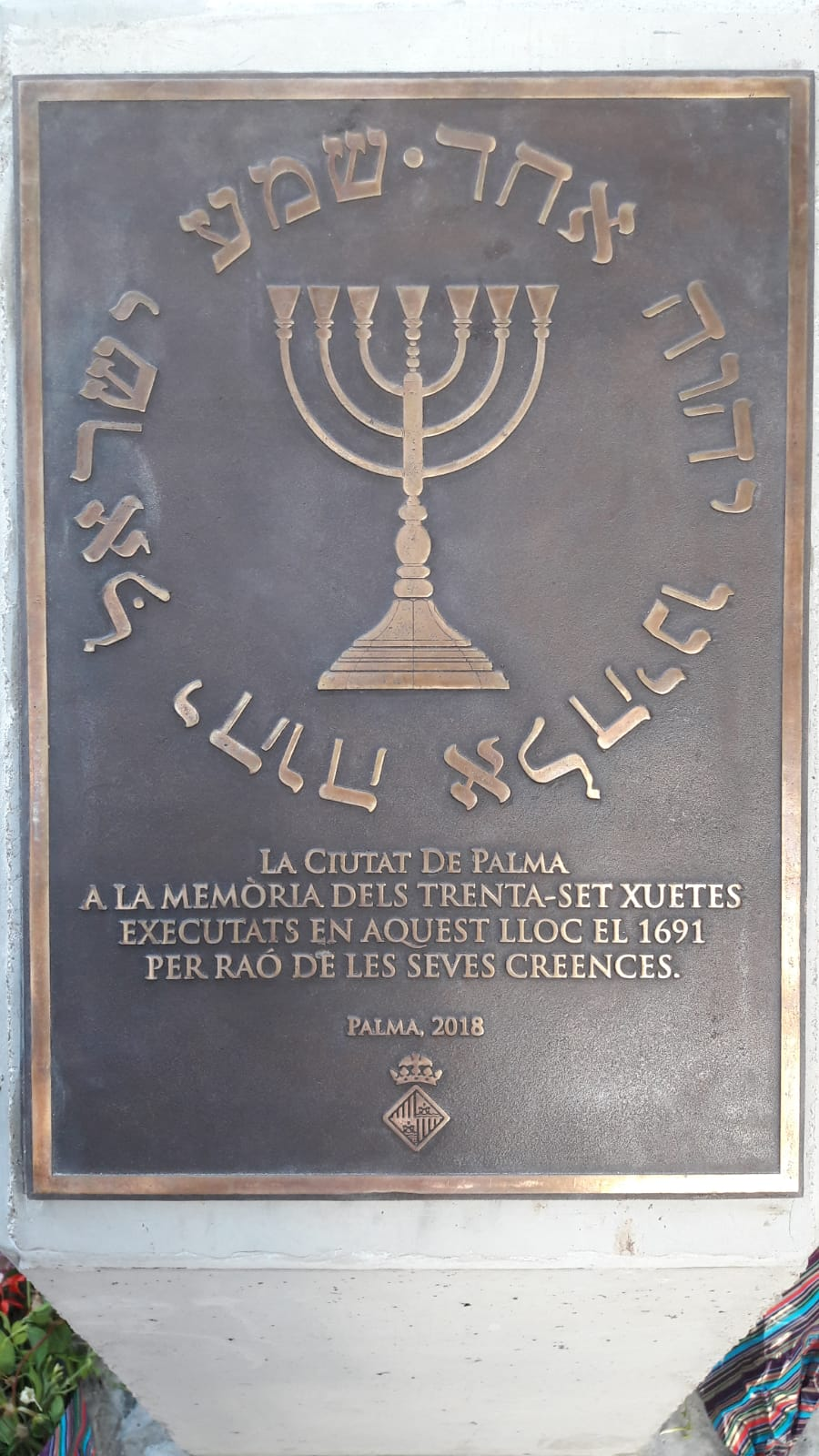
Memorial als xuetes (Memorial to the Xuetas), Gomila Square, Palma de Mallorca. Inaugurated in 2018, it remembers the 37 Xuetas who were executed in this same place in 1691, in an auto-da-fé by the Spanish Inquisition.

An important event, with the advent of democracy, was the election in 1979 of Ramon Aguiló (of direct Xueta ancestry), re-elected socialist mayor of Palma until 1991, whose election by popular vote could be considered the principal evidence of the decline of discrimination, ratified by other cases, such as that of Francesc Aguiló, mayor of Campanet.

All of this, however, does not imply a complete elimination of rejection of the Xuetes, as is indicated by a poll conducted by the University of the Balearic Islands in 2001, in which 30% of Mallorcans affirmed that they would not marry a Xueta, and 5% declared that they would not even want to have Xuetes as friends, numbers that, despite being high, are nuanced in that those in favor of discrimination tend to be seniors.

Several Xueta institutions have been created in recent years: the association RCA-Llegat Jueu ("Jewish Legacy"), the investigative group Memòria del Carrer, the religious group Institut Rafel Valls, the magazine Segell, and the city of Palma has joined the Red de Juderias de España ("Network of Spanish Jewries", Spanish cities with a historic Jewish presence).

Immigration in the early 21st century is stimulating renewed activity in the community, including at the Palma synagogue, involving newcomers and Chuetas. A son of the community, Rabbi Nissan Ben-Avraham returned to Spain in 2010 after being ordained as a rabbi in Israel.

== Recognition ==
In 2011 Rabbi Nissim Karelitz, a leading rabbi and halachic authority and chairman of the Beit Din Tzedek rabbinical court in Bnei Brak, Israel, recognized the Chuetas of Palma de Mallorca as Jewish.

The Xuetes' discrimination was in September 2023 formally acknowledged by the parliament of the Balearic Islands. The Federation of Jewish Communities of Spain hailed such an institutional unanimous recognition of "the discrimination and marginalisation suffered by the descendants of the island's Jews". In 2015, the Spanish government had already successfully (more than 30,000 applications) offered citizenship to descendants of Jews expelled in 1492 "to compensate for shameful events in the country's past".
