= Maulets =

Maulets may refer to:

- Maulets (history), Valencian supporters of Archduke Charles during the War of the Spanish Succession.
- Maulets (politics), a Catalan pro-independence youth political organization.
