= Juan Bautista Basset y Ramos =

Spanish soldier (1654–1728)

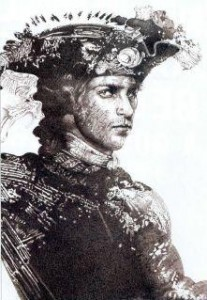
- Born: c. 1654; Alboraya, Valencia, Spain
- Died: January 15, 1728 (aged 73–74); Segovia, Spain
- Military career
- Allegiance: Spain
- Branch: Kingdom of Valencia
- Service years: 1718-1728
- Rank: Lieutenant-Colonel
- Conflicts: War of the Spanish Succession: Defense of Játiva; Battle of Almansa; Siege of Barcelona (1713–14)

Juan Bautista Basset y Ramos (c. 1654 in Alboraya – January 15, 1728, in Segovia) was a Valencian military man who led the revolt of the Kingdom of Valencia against Philip of Anjou during the War of the Spanish Succession as leader of the Maulets, Valencian supporters of Archduke Charles of Austria.

== Biography ==
Basset was born into a family of artisans. His father, Juan Basset, was a carpenter, sculptor and gilder of images and altarpieces. His mother was Esperanza Ramos.

He served as a professional soldier in the Austrian army of Archduke Charles of Austria, who was later crowned emperor of the Holy Roman Empire as Emperor Charles VI with the support of Jorge de Darmstadt, the Prince of Hesse. Basset sailed with the Anglo-Dutch fleet that carried the Austrian candidate to take over as king of Spain in 1704.

After the capture of Gibraltar, the Allied troops landed in Denia on 17 August 1705. Within weeks Basset y Ramos, serving as General of the austracistas forces, arrived in the city of Valencia, where they proclaimed the Archduke Charles of Austria as King Charles III. In February 1706, he organized the defense of Játiva, victoriously rejecting the Bourbon troops. Basset captained the Valencian revolt against the absolutist and centralizing government of Felipe V, joined the demands of the peasants against the nobles, and the merchants and artisans of the cities aligned with pro-trade elements in the Netherlands and England against the power of the French. Thus he became chief of maulets against supporters of Philip of Anjou.

Basset y Ramos was tried and imprisoned by King Charles, whom he served, in consequence of promising Valencian farmers exemption from fees and taxes. Following the defeat in the Battle of Almansa, on April 25, 1707, he was released to organize the few remaining forces loyal to the austracistas, an impossible task, and to gather troops to defend Barcelona, which delayed the fall of the city until September 11, 1714.

Ten days after the capitulation, despite the promises of James FitzJames, 1st Duke of Berwick not to retaliate, Basset was arrested by the Bourbon troops and taken to Alicante, and from there to various prisons, such as Fuenterrabía and Segovia. He died in Segovia January 15, 1728, being buried by charity by the Jesuits. On his deathbed he received notification from Emperor Charles VI of his rise to Fieldmarshall-Lieutenant of the imperial army.

== See also ==
- List of viceroys of Valencia
