= Xueta Christianity =

Syncretic religion on the island of Mallorca, Spain

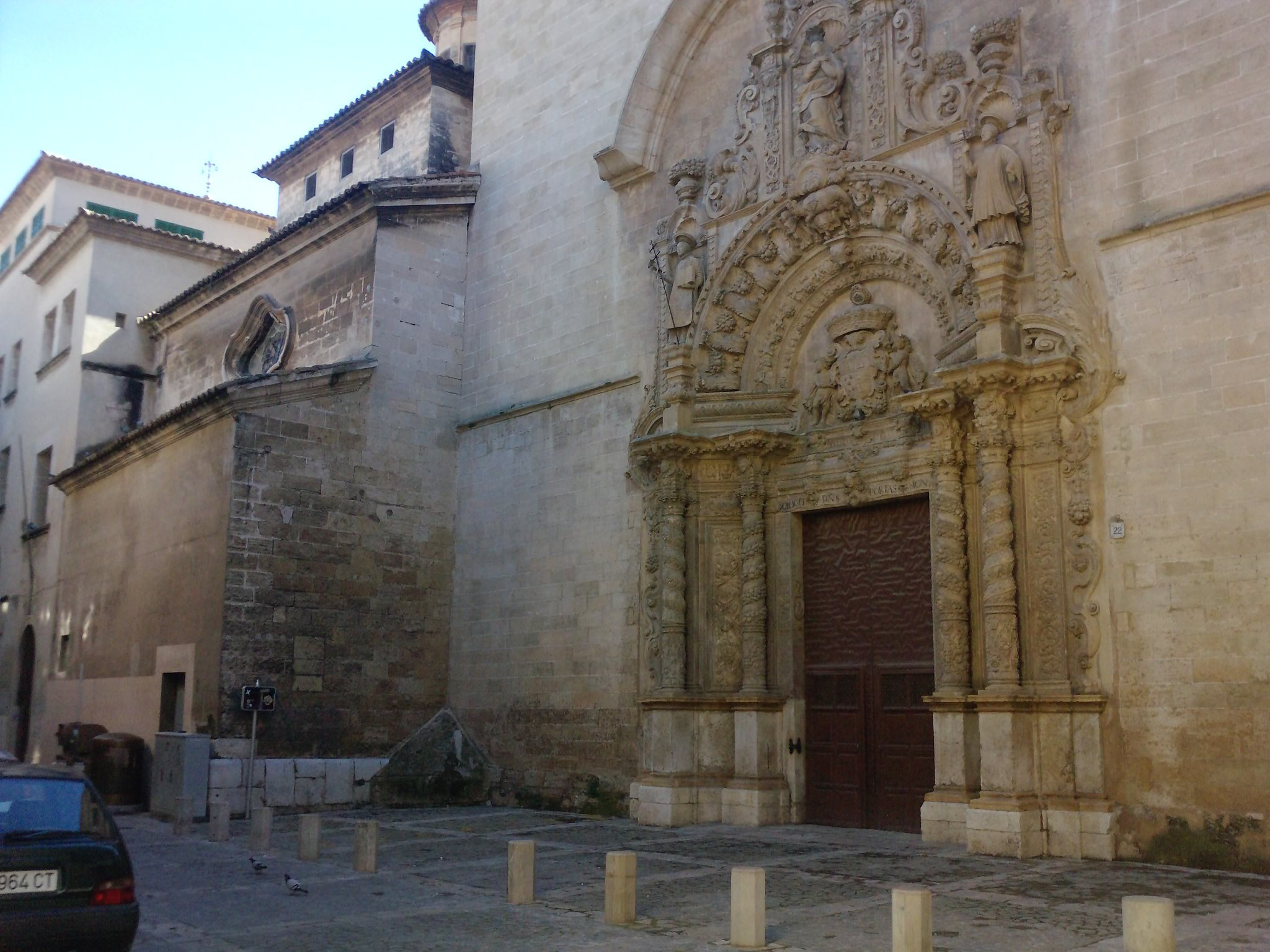
Church of Montesión in Palma de Mallorca, the main Church of Chuetas of Mallorca

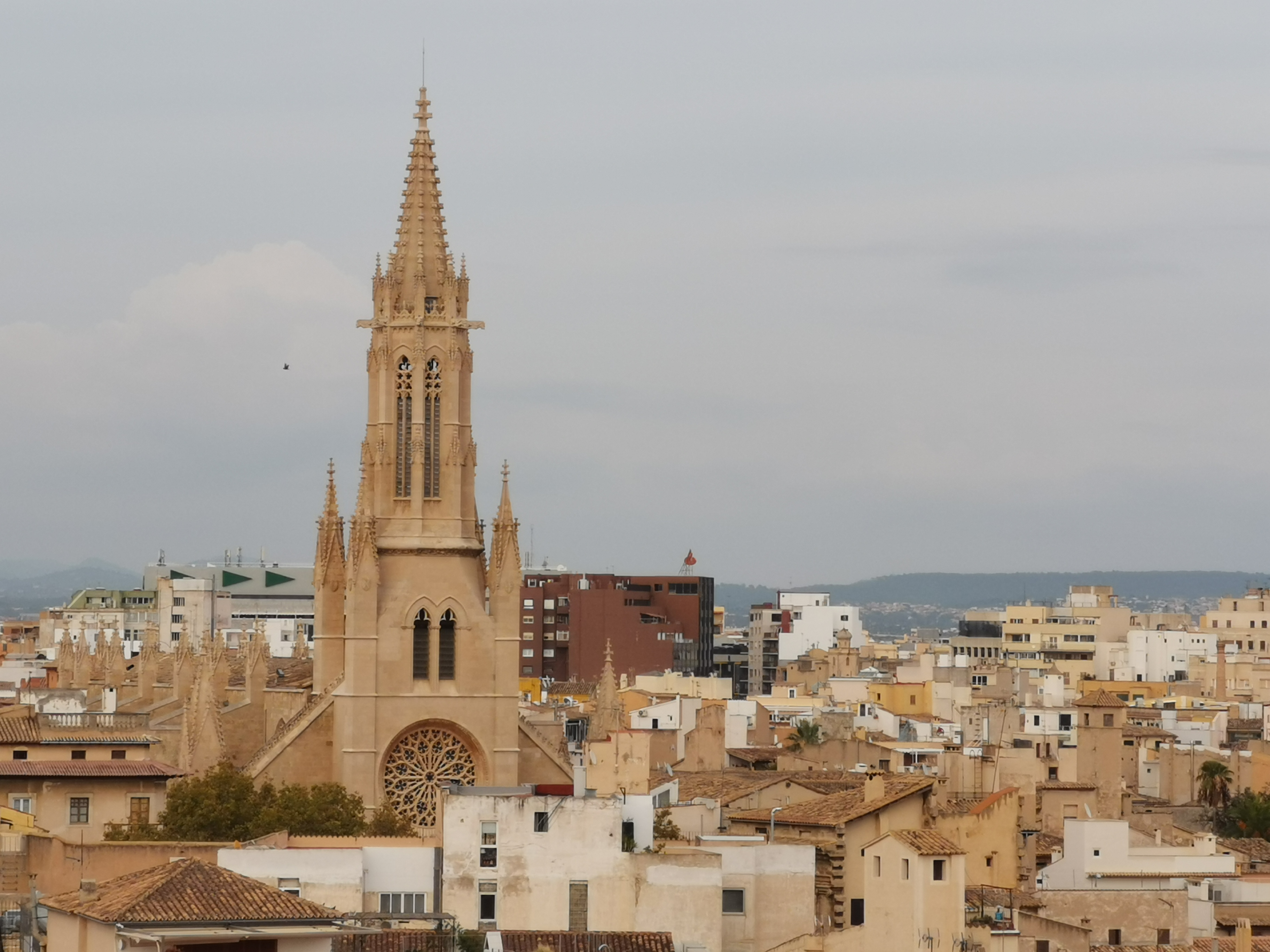
Church of Saint Eulalia in Palma de Mallorca

Xueta Christianity (Catalan: cristianisme xueta) is a syncretic religion on the island of Mallorca, Spain followed by the Xueta people, who are descendants of persecuted Jews who were converts to Christianity. Traditionally, the church of Saint Eulalia and the church of Montesión (Mount Zion) in Palma de Mallorca have been used by the families of Jewish converts (Xuetas), and both are the centers of Xueta religious ritual life. The Palma's Mont Zion Church was once the main synagogue of Palma de Mallorca. It is estimated that there are roughly 20,000 Chuetas living on the island of Mallorca today, and they practiced strict endogamy by marrying only within their own group.
