= Caterina Tarongí =

Majorcan Jewish woman burned alive by the Inquisition

Caterina Tarongí i Tarongí
- Born: 1646; Palma, Balearic Islands
- Died: 6 May 1691 (aged 44–45); Palma, Balearic Islands
- Other names: Catalina Tarongí
- Known for: Being burned alive by the Spanish Inquisition

Caterina Tarongi i Tarongi (1646, Palma – May 6, 1691) was a Jewish woman burned alive by the Spanish Inquisition.

== The Tarongí i Tarongí family ==
She was born in Palma, the capital of the then Kingdom of Majorca (which recovered its Roman name Palma in 1715).

She was the daughter of Rafel Josep Felós Tarongí i Aguiló, and Francina Tarongi i Martí. She was the wife of Guillem Morro Tarongi Fès. Caterina's parents had seven children in total: Caterina, Isabel, Margalida, Francina, Francesc Guillem and Rafel.

Between 1677 and 1678, 237 xuetas were imprisoned for celebrating Yom Kippur in the orchards of Pere Onofre Moixina Cortès, after being denounced by Rafel Cortès d'Alfons; among the prisoners of the so-called "Conspiracy of 1678", were all the members of the Tarongí family, who were imprisoned and put on trial by the Inquisition. All the family assets were seized and everyone went away with several light sentences.

Just after the autos-da-fé of 1678, the two oldest siblings of Caterina, Francesc and Guillem, managed to flee the island and arrived in Alexandria (Egypt), where they openly returned to Judaism, taking back their Jewish names, David and Salomón, respectively.

== The autos-da-fé of 1688 ==
On the afternoon of Sunday March 7, 1688, a group of xueta (Majorcan Jewish) families from Palma tried to flee the island on an English ship, but the vessel failed to set sail and they returned to their homes; however, they were discovered by Mallorcan Catholics, and as a result they were quickly imprisoned.

Unlike the captured during the "Conspiracy of 1678", almost all the conversos were declared Jews and they refused to repent of their intention to return to Judaism in the countries where it was permitted. The trials were conducted during three years. In 1688, apparently because of the tortures that were applied on them, her parents and her sister Francina died.

== The autos-da-fé of 1691 ==
In 1691, the Spanish Inquisition held autos-da-fé in which a total of 37 Majorcan Crypto-Jews were killed, out of a total of 82 that were processed by the Balearic inquisitorial court:

- On March 7, 1691, when 21 Xuetes were sentenced to light punishments.
- On May 1, 1691: 21 prisoners were sentenced to death by hitting with a club and have their bodies burned later.
- On May 6, 1691, when the sentences to 21 other converts were pronounced: 14 were to be burned, and seven in effigy. Out of the 14, 11 were sentenced to die being hit with a club before being burned, as forgiveness for their confession. The other three defendants were sentenced to be burned alive: Rabbi Rafel Valls, Caterina Tarongí and her brother Rafel Tarongí. Her sisters, Margalida and Isabel Tarongí, were strangled and burned ón the same day.
- On July 2, 1691, when 23 converts were sentenced : 17 in person and 6 who were already dead or fugitives.

Caterina Tarongí was burned alive in the auto-da-fé on 6 May 1691. It is said that the inquisitors were impressed not only with her beauty, but her determination in not abjuring her beliefs, even defiantly, which they attributed to the "diabolic qualities" she possessed. Her auto-da-fé was witnessed by about thirty thousand people.

There is a detailed account of the burnings and also of Caterina Tarongi and her brother Rafel in the book La fe triunfante, written by the Jesuit priest Francesc Garau:

It was this young man [Rafel], a great disciple and confessed henchman of Rafael Valls, whose authority he appealed to as he spoke, deferring both his sayings as he could to Moses or Jeremiah, and when finding himself attacked, replied that he had not studied, but Valls would speak for him. Completely drunk of his pride, which had almost dominated him, and still more ignorant, nothing overcame his stubbornness, simply imitating his stoicism, manifesting all the way to the brazier expelling all his rage saying that his heart was burning, with the same inner principle of a spurned and furious outside, and mastering a profound melancholy, although affected with peace; but each one, in his own way, represented a living convict. "This was the brother of Caterina Tarongí, who died too opinionated, without further reason than her own apparent anger and rage, because when I asked what she believed, or what took her apart from the Catholic faith, or what it was to be Jewish, she said that she only knew she was Jewish and that she wanted to be only Jewish. She had been regretful while awaiting the notification of her death sentence, but then she was being clothed, the demon who was harbored in her heart discovered himself, but without anything worth of what they to reduce it or of those who tried to help, like Dr. Onofre Morrellas ... whose zeal and piety lost no opportunity despite failing, which could lead to save her. These two were siblings of Francisco Josef Tarongí, and Guillermo Tomás Tarongí, those absent fugitives who were also relaxed and burned in effigy by relapses, convicted and unrepented. More so and to worship the Four Secrets of Divine Providence, the sisters of these four, Isabel Tarongí, woman of Agustín Cortés and Margarita Tarongí, maiden, despite being allowed to fall into the same faults, were assisted with grace to stand up, return to the faith and persevere in it to the end, as examples that can be piously believed. So six brothers (a lastrosa family?) that came in this auto, two were burned alive to be burn forever in Hell, the other two were burned in effigy as omens of their eternal damnation if they do not amend their behavior, and the other two died repented and with hopes of Heaven.

They walked from where nowadays the Parliament of the Balearic Islands is located to Hoguera de los Judíos (the "bonfire of the Jews"), near Gomila Square.

The three of them, Rafael Valls and the two Tarongí siblings, have been commemorated as martyrs and heroes in ballads that balearic islanders have sung until recently. Kayserling (p. 184) cites the following stanzas, sung by the islanders:

En Valls duia sa bandera
i en Tarongí es penó,
amb sos xuetes darrera
que feien sa processó.

Com es foc li va arribar
a ses rues des calçons
li deia «Felet, no't dons
que ta carn no es cremarà».

I venia gent d'Eivissa,
pagesos d'Artà, d'Andratx,
perque el dia sis de maig
feren sa socorradissa.

Valls carried the flag
and Tarongí the banner
with all the Xuetes behind them
who were making the procession.

When the fire came
to the wrinkles of her clothes
she said: "Felet, do not give up,
because your flesh will not be burned".

And people came from Ibiza
peasants from Artá and Andratx,
because the sixth of de May
they made the burning.

The term "Felet, no't dons" used by Caterina Tarongí to encourage her brother, aged 21, not to surrender to the threats of the inquisitors, is still used in Majorca when referring to a stubborn person.

== Legacy ==
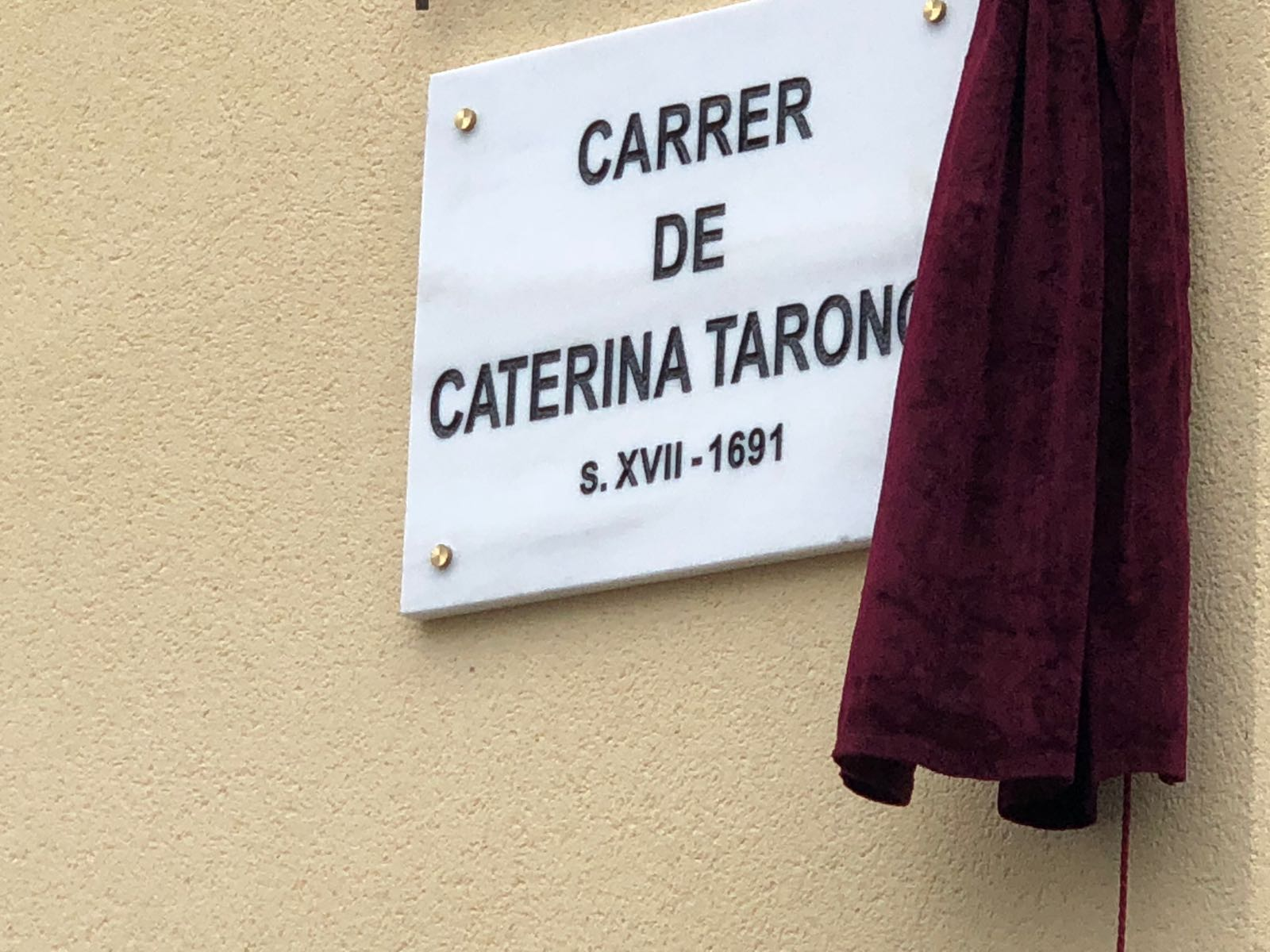
plaque for Caterina Tarongí, Palma

On May 5, 2011, an official event was held at Consolat de Mar in memory of the burning of 1691, with the attendance of Francesc Antich, president of the Government of the Balearic Islands; Rabbi Nissan ben Avraham, descendant of the Tarongí family, and Rabbi José Wallis, descendant of Rafael Valls. The event was the first ever organized by a regional government in Spain to honor the victims of the Spanish Inquisition.
