= Battle of El Albujón =

1706 battle of the War of the Spanish Succession

- Part of the War of the Spanish Succession
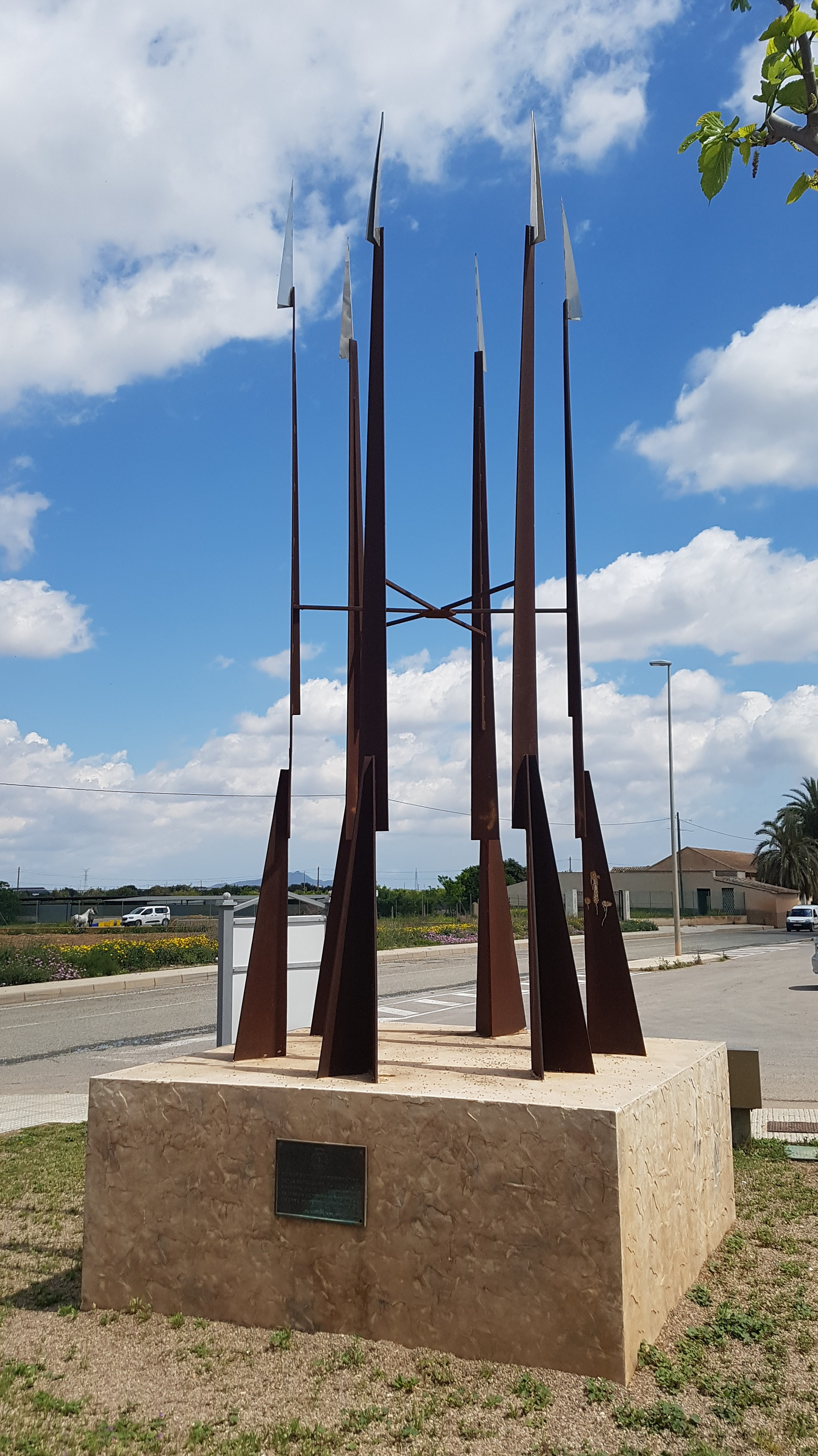
- Memorial of the battle, work of the sculptor Pedro José García Andreo (2006).
Date	21 September 1706
Location	El Albujón district, Cartagena (Spain)
Result	Victory for Philip V

Belligerents
(Spain) Spanish loyal to Philip V	(Spain) Spanish loyal to Archduke Charles (Kingdom of England) England

The Battle of El Albujón was a confrontation between Bourbon troops under commandante Patricio Moran and corporal José Hernández and an English force backed by troops loyal to Charles VI. It took place on 21 September 1706 and formed part of the War of the Spanish Succession. It took part in the El Albujón district of the Spanish town of Cartagena and ended in a Bourbon victory. With the victory at the battle of Murcia, it led to the reconquest of Cartagena and evidenced the failure of the Austrian campaign in the kingdom of Murcia, a region of Castile.

== Bibliography ==
- Albareda Salvadó, Joaquim (2010). La Guerra de Sucesión de España (1700-1714). Barcelona: Editorial Crítica. ISBN 84-989-2060-4.
