= Robres =

Coordinates: 41°52′N 0°28′W

- municipality
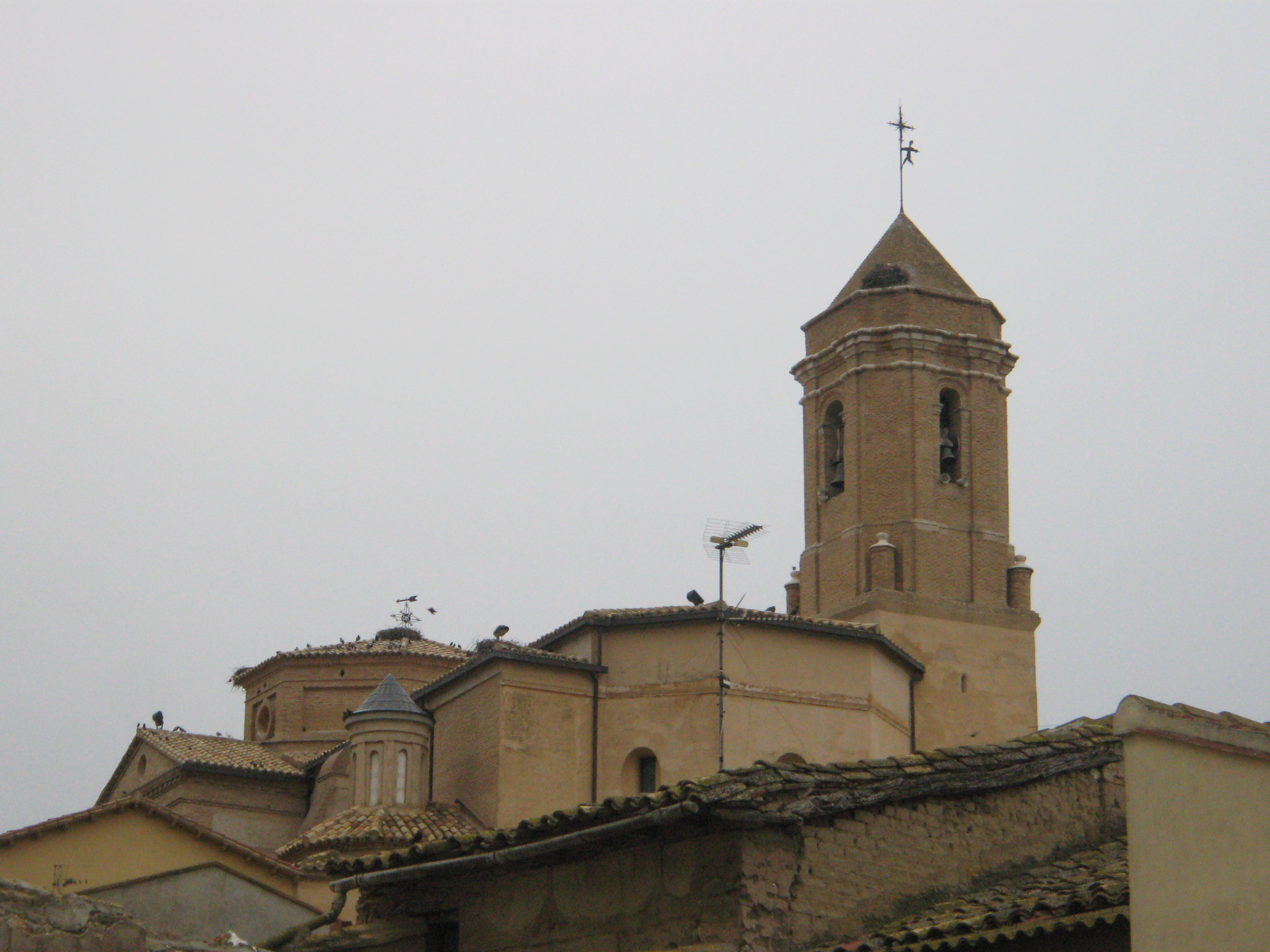
- Parish Church of Our Lady of the Assumption in the Spanish municipality of Robres, Huesca.

- Flag Coat of arms
- Interactive map of Robres
- Country: Spain
- Autonomous community: Aragon
- Province: Huesca
- Municipality: Robres

Area
  - Total: 64 km^{2} (25 sq mi)

Population (2025-01-01)
  - Total: 524
  - Density: 8.2/km^{2} (21/sq mi)
- Time zone: UTC+1 (CET)
  - Summer (DST): UTC+2 (CEST)

Robres is a municipality located in the province of Huesca, Aragon, Spain. According to the 2018 census (INE), the municipality has a population of 531 inhabitants.

== See also ==
- List of municipalities in Huesca
- Count of Robres
