= Maulets (history) =

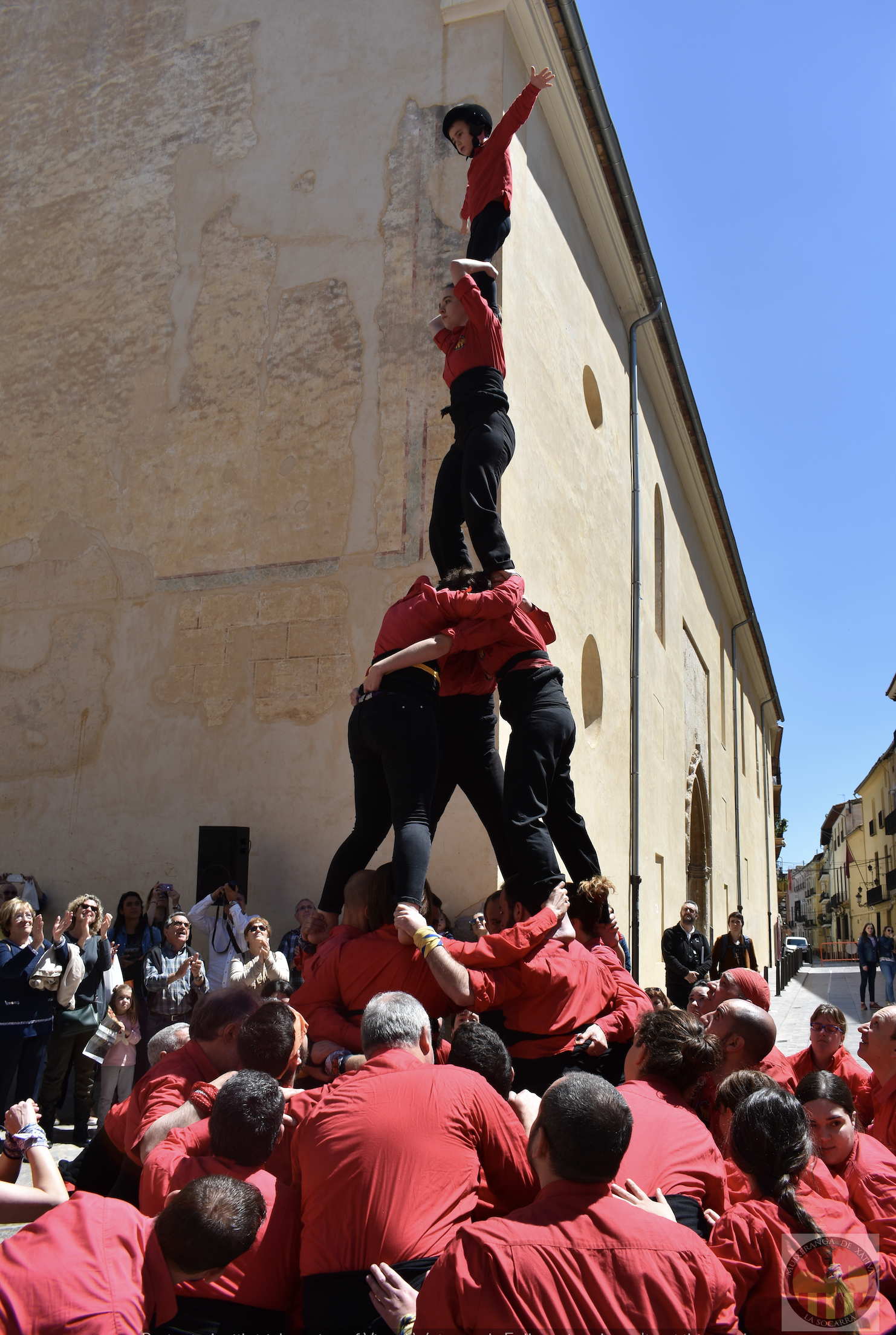
Remat Alta de 5. Muixeranga de Xàtiva. Portal of St. Francesc. Tribute to the Maules. Xàtiva.

The Maulets (Valencian pronunciation: [mawˈlets]) were Valencian supporters of Archduke Charles' claim to the Spanish throne during the War of the Spanish Succession. They were opposed by the supporters of Philip V the competing claimant and eventual winner of the war.

== Previous revolts ==
To compensate the Valencian nobility for the loss of the large number of Morisco peasants after their expulsion, the nobility were given greater rights over the lands that the Moriscos had farmed. This allowed them to impose high taxes and rents on the resettled Christian population.

Towards the end of the 17th century the increasingly prosperous peasant population challenged these aristocratic prerogatives in court. Using to the Furs of Valencia granted by James I of Aragon after the conquest of Valencia, they claimed that the high taxes and tributes were reserved for Moriscos rather than old Christians such as themselves. However with the nobility controlling the judicial process an armed revolt, the Second Revolt of the Brotherhoods (Segona Germania), took place with very similar grievances to the Maulets' seven years later.

This in turn was crushed in 1693, but the causes of peasant discontent remained so that when Charles II died in 1700 without a clear heir the revolt could restart.

Previous tensions between centralists and localists had already spilled over into violent confrontations from the 1590 Alterations of Aragon and continued in the Reapers' War and the Portuguese Restoration War in the late seventeenth century.

== Ideology ==
Like other lands in the Crown of Aragon Hapsburg support was relatively strong in the Kingdom of Valencia when Philip V of Spain took possession of the territory as Felip IV of Valencia. This was also the case in the Principality of Catalonia and Majorca. The reasons varied from the peasant discontent discussed above, legitimist loyalty to the Habsburg line, commercial rivalry with France and opposition to Bourbon centralism.

=== Constitutional Conservatism ===
Suspicion that a Bourbon king would want to dismantle local privileges and fueros was a major reason for the revolt. The states within the Crown of Aragon strongly supported the Hapsburg claim due to a belief that Bourbon absolutism threatened local constitutional systems rooted in medieval fueros, which gave local fiscal, military, monetary, and judicial autonomy, within a pluralistic structure of a composite monarchy of several kingdoms. The pro-Bourbon Count of Robres noted during the war that these states sided with Charles because they deemed their privileges unsafe under a monarch raised in an absolutist court.

=== Anti-French feeling ===
Merchants and exporters of wine, brandy, silk, and other farming products, which were politically and economically very important, contacted a key person for their cause: General Joan Baptista Basset. General Basset was a Valencian, probably born in Alboraia in an artisan family, who spoke the people's language and knew very well their claims and needs. He had served during the wars in Italy and Hungary under Prince George of Hesse-Darmstadt, a German noble who had previously been viceroy in Catalonia.

The War of the Spanish Succession had a double nature. On the one hand, it was a Spanish internal issue; on the other hand, it was a major European war for international hegemony. England and the Netherlands (the so-called "Maritime powers", traditional destinations of the Valencian merchants' exports) sided against the Bourbon claimant, Philip V. As a part of a blockade, Valencian exports to these countries stopped, which meant a total downfall for merchants and the peasants that sold them their Valencian products. The exports to France, a land that produced and exported the same products, did not compensate them in any way for the losses.

== Successful rebellion ==
From 1704, Francesc Davila, who was probably a leader of the Segona Germania who had escaped persecution, toured all the southern counties of Valencia explaining to the peasants that the Austrian pretender was ready to abolish all the rights of the nobles to higher taxes than the ones imposed by James I. When Joan Baptista Basset disembarked in Altea in August 1705, a new revolt commenced and spread out everywhere.

Basset rode to Valencia, via Dénia, Gandia and Alzira without meeting any real resistance. When the mostly Bourbon-supporting nobles or the fortresses tried to resist, it was the armed villagers who forced them to flee. Together with the viceroy, Duke Gandia, a long list of Nobles and "botiflers" siding with Philip V of Spain fled, not to Valencia, but to Castile; they did not trust the resistance of the capital, and with reason.

The city of Valencia opened its doors to the Maulet army without resistance. On the contrary, it was received with popular enthusiasm. At the same time, news from the uprising in the Principality of Catalonia arrived, where a rebelling had expelled the "Felipist" military and where Charles III himself had triumphantly disembarked in Barcelona. This news was enough to spread the uprising through in the rest of the Kingdom of Valencia, especially in its northern part, from Vinaròs and Benicarló to Vila-real and Castelló, where the Maulets were specially strong.

Once Basset was established in Valencia, practically exercising the function of Viceroy, and with most of the country under control of the Maulets (meaning, of the armed villagers), the first thing was to abolish all taxes to the nobles. Basset even went further and with the doubtful legality of his high office, stopped paying any kind of tax to the tax collectors of the King. He also abolished the right of doors, a hated tax on products coming from the colonies into Valencia. He also tolerated, and even stimulated, a real persecution, expulsion and arrest of French citizens, mainly merchants, who were seen by the population as enemies and by the native merchants as dangerous competitors. Relationships with the maritime powers allied to Charles III were re-established, and the harbours were again opened to Dutch and English ships, resuming trade as before. At the same time, Basset and the Maulets arrested and ousted the most notorious "botiflers", and seized their possessions.

== Clash amongst allies ==
Basset, now in control of the Valencian country, had to organize armed resistance against Bourbonic attacks. He realized quickly that his peasant army of Maulets was no match for the professional Bourbonic army, let alone their French allies.

Basset asked Charles III for military help. The help came, in the form of the Earl of Peterborough and his English soldiers. Even though his arrival saved the delicate situation from enemies' attacks, it also meant the creation of another political power led by Count Cardona, with a military force independent from the Maulets and with no intention of allowing what they considered "plebeian excesses".

It all points to the fact that count Cardona and the English general had instructions, probably from the King, to end the "excesses" of Basset and the Maulets, in this way trying to gain back the support of the nobles, most of them siding with the Bourbons.

Sure enough, Charles III, as an owner of royal lands and main lord of the Order of Montesa, had experienced a reduction in his income, by the Maulets' refusal to pay. This money was absolutely necessary to keep the very expensive army together with which he hoped to win the war. In consequence, it was necessary to stop the Maulets and their chief, General Basset, but it was necessary to do it wisely and with indulgence.

Cardona and Peterborough then started an offensive centred at some of Basset's collaborators, pointing to the illegal confiscation and loot for personal use of the goods from the French and the Botiflers, and imprisoned them awaiting trial. Meanwhile, Basset was lured away from Valencia, first to Alzira and later on to Xàtiva, encouraging him to take part in the fighting. They awaited an opportunity to imprison him, but were fearful of his great popularity amongst the people and feared a rebellion of the Maulets if that ever happened.

The occasion came when Charles III had defeated the Bourbons in Castile and had managed to enter Madrid on June 27, 1706. In between the popular celebrations, Peterborough secretly sent troops to Xàtiva, with the order to arrest Basset and imprison him in a fortress in English hands. When news came out, effectively the people revolted.

In Valencia the shouts of "Long live to Basset, before than Charles III" proved the real allegiances of the Valencian Maulets. In fact, Peterborough had to turn around those cannons meant to defend Valencia from the Bourbons to aim at the revolting population, to drive them off. During days there were demonstrations of protest, letters sent to Charles in Barcelona and all kind of public declarations in favour of Basset and his reforms. But a renewed Maulet revolt, this time against one whom they considered their legitimate King, all with a Bourbon army at the doors of the Kingdom ready for war, would have been suicidal. A victory of the Bourbons would have meant the return of the Botiflers, and the previous state of affairs. Consequently, Maulets resigned and stopped their protests, believing that the pretender Charles, in coming to Valencia shortly, would repair the injustice and would free Basset.

== Defeat and retreat ==
Meanwhile, the Maulets continued refusing to pay the door rights, or any other taxes. Charles III demanded from the authorities from Valencia to call for its payment, without much success. But time was running out. Charles had already been forced to abandon Madrid and suffered a crushing defeat in the hands of the Duke of Berwick in the Battle of Almansa. Charles withdrew towards Barcelona, and with him the Viceroy, the whole administration and surviving troops.

The people and the Maulets were left at the mercy of the Bourbon advance. King Philip never hid his intentions to overrun the Furs (the Valencian laws) "by the just right of conquest". The Valencian kingdom disappeared as a legal structure, and was only left as a name, empty of meaning.

The Maulets resisted, especially in Xàtiva, a town which had to be taken by the Bourbonics after a fierce battle, and was afterwards razed and set on fire as a reprisal. In Valencia, the Maulets tried in vain to hinder the entrance of the Bourbonic army, but Berwick and Asfeld managed their way in.

When, in 1710, the war seemed to turn back in favor of Charles III, the city of Valencia raised again in anti-Bourbon revolt. The Maulets appeared on the streets again, awaiting in vain an Austriacista fleet that had to disembark troops at the harbour. A few remaining Valencian Maulets withdrew towards Catalonia still in the hands of Charles III.

== Barcelona 1714, the last stand ==
Thousands of Valencian refugees concentrated in Barcelona and other cities of the Principality of Catalonia. But the international events made clear the futility of carrying on the struggle. Charles III himself had signed a peace treaty with Philip V of Spain and went back to Austria. The maritime powers had accepted Philip V as king of Spain and had evacuated their troops from Barcelona over sea. The Catalans and the Valencian Maulets carried on fighting for their cause devoid of international allies.

When the Bourbon armies, led by Berwick himself, laid siege on Barcelona two regiments of Valencians were formed, the Mare de Déu dels Desamparats and the Sant Vicent Ferrer, to fight along their comrades in Catalonia.

On September 11, 1714, when Barcelona fell into Bourbon hands after a determined fight, many Maulets were counted among the fallen. Many others, amongst them General Basset, who had directed the artillery of the resistance, were arrested and imprisoned. Others, who managed to escape from the Bourbon troops via Majorca, or who were later on freed, ended up exiled in Vienna, at the court of "their" Charles III, now emperor of Austria.

== Sources ==
- "The War of Spanish Succession in Dénia (Valencia)" (in Spanish). Archivo Munipal de Dénia. Archived from the original on September 27, 2007.
- Moll, Jordi Günzberg (2008). "Origen, desarrollo y extinción de un derecho histórico en Cataluña: El Derecho de Extranjería" (PDF). Ius Fugit (in Spanish) (15).
- Morales, Julio (2015). "Negociando la Fidelidad: La Cultura Politica Criolla durante las Festivadades. Lima 1700-1725" (PDF) (in Spanish). Archived from the original (PDF) on January 23, 2024.
- Salvadó, Joaquim Albareda (2010). La Guerra de Sucesión de España (1700–1714) (in Spanish). Barcelona: Crítica. ISBN 978-84-9892-060-4.
