= Austracista =

Supporters of Charles of Austria during the War of the Spanish Succession

Imperials, Eaglets, Vigatans, Maulets and Archduchists. The eagle is the symbol of the Holy Roman Empire

Austriacista (Spanish pronunciation: [ˈaustɾjaθista]) is the term currently used by Spanish historiography to refer to the Spanish supporters of Archduke Charles of Austria as a candidate to the Spanish Crown during the War of the Spanish Succession (1701–1713). Bourbon supporters on the other hand supported Philip of Anjou, grandson of Louis XIV of France. Although present in Castile and Spanish America, support for the Habsburgs was concentrated in the territories of the Crown of Aragon which included Valencia, Mallorca and the Principality of Catalonia.

== Crown of Aragon ==
The states within the Crown of Aragon strongly supported the Habsburg claim due to a belief that Bourbon absolutism threatened local constitutional systems rooted in their fueros, which gave extensive autonomy to local structures within a pluralistic structure of a number of kingdoms under the same crown.

Earlier tensions between centralists and localists had already spilled over into violent confrontations from the 1590 Alterations of Aragon. In the late seventeenth century this was followed by the Reapers' War, the Portuguese Restoration War and the Second Revolt of the Brotherhoods.

In the Principality of Catalonia especially, Habsburg loyalists were more concerned with the defense of local laws and institutions over dynastic concerns. Loyalty to the pàtria (homeland) superseded loyalty to a monarch who violated its constitutions. The 1705 Pact of Genoa between England and Catalan envoys mentioned the Catalan Constitutions seventeen times, highlighting their importance. A jurist exiled in Vienna summarized: "Catalonia, being free, is subject not to the law of anyone else, but to its own law."

This constitutionalist vision emphasized a pluralistic monarchy, as noted by Francesc de Castellví in his Historical Narratives: "Though all the continent of Spain calls its natives Spaniards, they were and are distinct... in laws, customs, clothing, and languages: Portuguese, Basque, Catalan, and Castilian or Aragonese."

== Anti-French Sentiment ==
Anti-French sentiment also featured heavily in pro-Habsburg pamphlets. One declared: "France is neither Catholic, nor Protestant, nor Muslim, nor any known sect; it is a new universal hydra adapting itself to its interests."

== Castile ==
Unlike in the Crown of Aragon, where Archduke Charles's cause had broad and diverse popular support, in the Crown of Castile, Austriacism was primarily upheld by sections of the high nobility, clergy, middle-ranking officials, and some merchant groups affected by French trade dominance. Popular support was minimal and largely favored Philip V, in contrast to the Crown of Aragon. Additionally, the strong regalism established in France by Louis XIV (Gallicanism) also influenced part of the clergy to align with the Austriacist cause.

The leader of Castilian Austriacism was Juan Tomás Enríquez de Cabrera, Admiral of Castile, who before the death of Charles II led the so-called "German party" with the queen, Charles's last wife Maria Anna of Neuburg, pressuring the king to name the Archduke Charles as successor. When Philip V took the throne, Enríquez de Cabrera went to Portugal, persuaded its king to abandon the Bourbon alliance, and join the Grand Alliance. In 1703, he published a manifesto denouncing that Charles II's testament was manipulated to favor Philip of Anjou and accused Louis XIV of seeking to conquer Spain. He claimed the Spanish were thus released from their oath of allegiance, as Philip V imposed "slavery" by a "foreign nation." The manifesto also criticized the economic domination by the French. Other noble supporters included the Viceroy of Sicily, Juan Francisco Pacheco Téllez-Girón, and Manuel Joaquín Álvarez de Toledo.

The core of Castilian Austriacist ideology was dynastic legitimacy—the legitimate House of Habsburg versus the illegitimate House of Bourbon. This was reflected in the motto of the first regiment under Charles III the Archduke, created by the Admiral of Castile and sent to Catalonia in 1705: Pro Lege, Rege et Patria.

== Peru ==
While Austriacism never sparked a civil war in the American colonies, it had notable influence, especially in the Viceroyalty of Peru. There, Austriacism resonated among rural elites, merchants, miners, and some clergy—especially Jesuits and Franciscans — who preferred the traditional Habsburg order over Bourbon reforms.

In Cusco, Puno, and Potosí, support for Charles of Austria—sometimes symbolized by calling supporters "eaglets"—reflected deep conservatism. The Republic of Indians often preferred the Habsburg model, which respected indigenous leadership. Fear of rebellion blocked some nobles, like the Marquess of Santiago de Oropesa, from returning to Peru, despite recovering their confiscated property.

Some historians argue that the ideology persisted in the 18th-century revolts. Túpac Amaru II's uprising, though anti-colonial in form, began with a call for Habsburg restoration, reflecting a deeply conservative ethos. Klaus Koschorke states it was "a counter-reform movement aiming to restore Habsburg Catholic governance".

== Other Parts of the Americas ==
In Cuba, English emissaries attempted to sway local elites to support the Archduke. Several influential figures, such as Lorenzo de Prado Carvajal and Juan de Balmaseda, supported the cause. In 1706, the governor even denied French ships entry to Havana, sparking conflict with French mariners.

In New Spain (Mexico), there were rumors and minor conspiracies in support of Charles, including an alleged 1706 plot in Mexico City and arrests of individuals spreading pro-Austriacist propaganda.

In Venezuela, Archduke Charles was briefly proclaimed king in 1702 due to actions by Bartolomé de Capocelato, an agent of the Emperor. Despite early success, pro-Bourbon sentiment reasserted control, and Capocelato fled. His associate, Jesuit Michael Schabel, helped distribute Austriacist pamphlets.

== Exile and persistent Austriacism ==
After the fall of Barcelona in September 1714, around 30,000 Austriacists went into exile, with several thousand settling in Vienna, where the court of Archduke Charles, now Emperor Charles VI, was based. Some held prominent positions, forming what was known as the "Spanish party" in opposition to the "German party".

The Treaty of Vienna (1725) ended the war diplomatically: Emperor Charles VI renounced his claims to the Spanish crown and recognized Philip V as King of Spain, while Philip acknowledged the Emperor's control over former Spanish territories in Italy and the Low Countries. Philip V granted amnesty to Austriacists, restored confiscated properties, and recognized titles granted by "Charles III the Archduke". However, he refused to restore the institutions of the Crown of Aragon. This concession by Charles VI drew criticism from some Austriacist sectors.

This led to a division between a "dynastic officialist" faction in Vienna, and a "constitutional" faction in Catalonia that maintained hope for political change. The latter viewed the treaty as a betrayal, since it abandoned hopes of restoring local laws and institutions.

In 1736, the pamphlet Record de l'Aliança, attributed to Rafael Casanova, reminded George II of Great Britain of the 1705 alliance between Catalonia and England. Other works advocated for either the return of the Habsburgs or the establishment of a free Catalan republic. The most significant was Juan Amor de Soria's Enfermedad crónica y peligrosa de los reinos de España y de Indias (1741), proposing a federal monarchy and regular sessions of representative Cortes across Spain's kingdoms.

== Bibliography ==
- Albaladejo, Pablo Fernández (2001). Los Borbones: dinastía y memoria de nación en la España del siglo XVIII (in Spanish). Marcial Pons Historia. ISBN 8495379368.
- Moll, Jordi Günzberg (2008). "Origen, desarrollo y extinción de un derecho histórico en Cataluña: El Derecho de Extranjería" (PDF). Ius Fugit (in Spanish) (15).
- Morales, Julio (2015). "Negociando la Fidelidad: La Cultura Politica Criolla durante las Festivadades. Lima 1700-1725" (PDF) (in Spanish). Archived from the original (PDF) on 23 January 2024.
- Salvadó, Joaquim Albareda (2010). La Guerra de Sucesión de España (1700–1714) (in Spanish). Barcelona: Crítica. ISBN 978-84-9892-060-4.
