= Count of Robres =

The Count of Robres is a Spanish noble title created by King Philip IV of Spain on November 20, 1646, in favor of Bernardo Pons y Turell, Regent of the Chancery in the Supreme Council of Aragon and a knight of the Order of Santiago.

The title is named after the town of Robres in the province of Huesca.
