= Botifler =

Name given to Philip V of Spain supporters

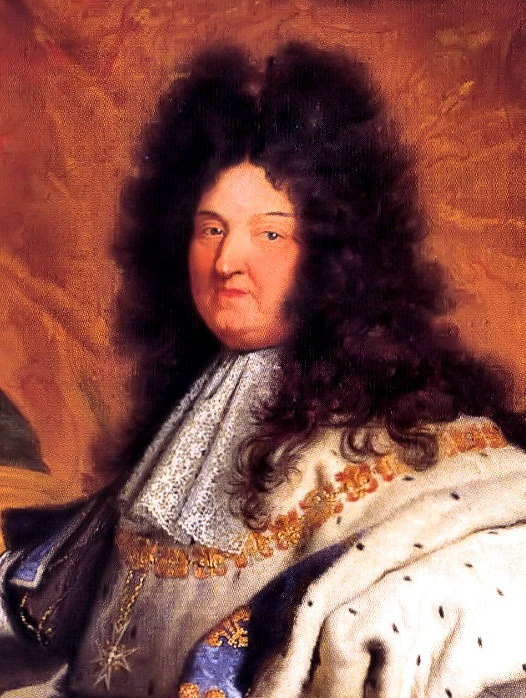
Louis XIV of France with his characteristic cheeks

Botiflers (Catalan pronunciation: [butiˈfle]) was a name given to the supporters of Philip V of Spain during the War of the Spanish Succession.

They were usually Catalan and Valencian aristocrats and members of the nobility who wanted to increase their power from the upcoming regime that would result after Bourbon victory. In Mallorca, the term evolved to "botifarres", which started to be used to refer to all noblemen independently of any national ascription.

Botifler originally referred to anyone having inflated cheeks. Later on, it designated specifically to any Bourbon supporter because the latter were said to have also inflated cheeks.

Nowadays, the term is used by Catalan and Valencian nationalists to refer pejoratively to who support House of Bourbon on the throne of Spain and defend centralism or whoever acts against Catalonian or Valencian nationalist interests.

There was some popular support within the Basque Country, Navarre and the Val d'Aran — despite their foralist traditions. Philip V rewarded them by maintaining their historic privileges.

== See also ==
- Maulets (history)
