= Sierra Minera de Cartagena-La Unión =

Mountain formation in the Region of Murcia (Spain)

Sierra minera de Cartagena
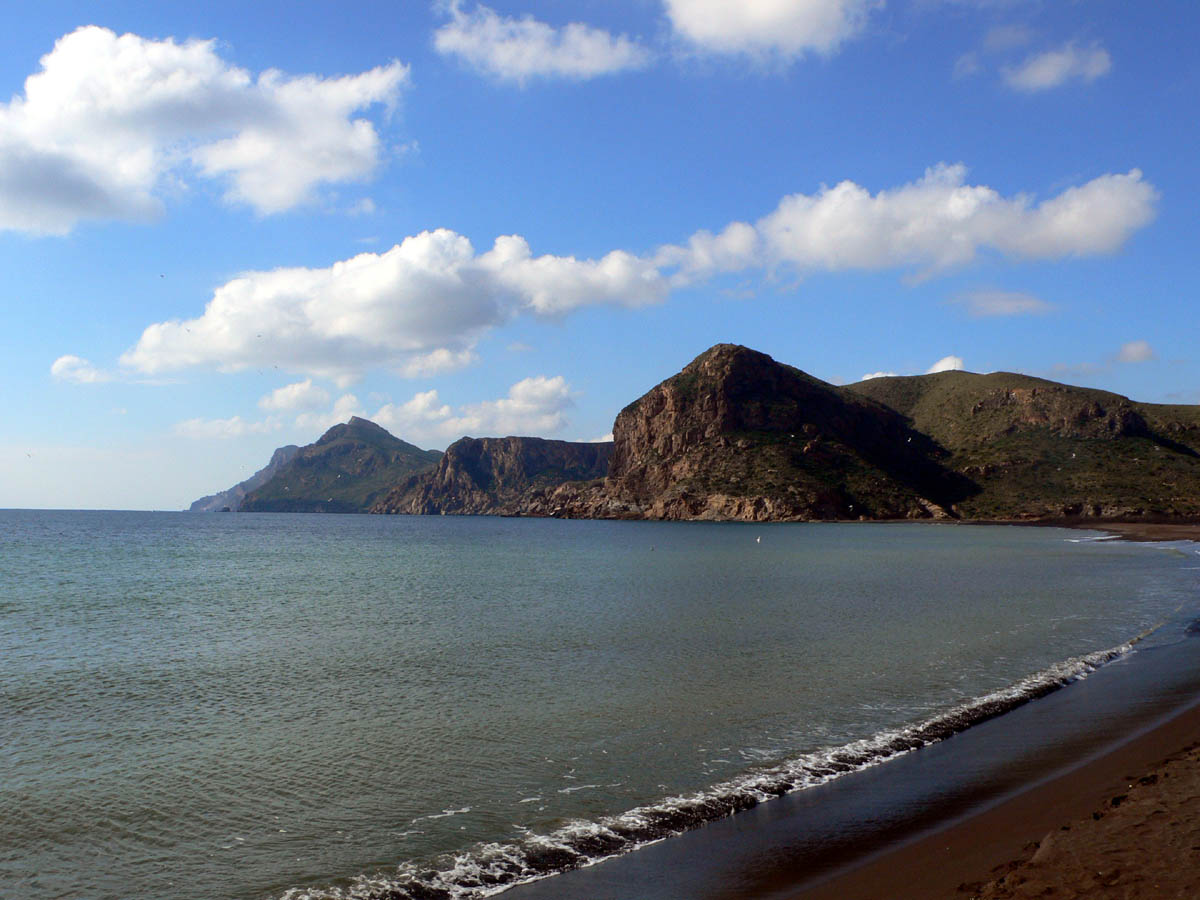
- Sierra de la Fausilla from Portmán, in the western sector of the mining district

Highest point
- Elevation: 431 m (1,414 ft)
- Coordinates: 37°36′38″N 00°51′40″W

Dimensions
- Length: 26 km (16 mi)
- Width: 79 km (49 mi)

Geography
- Location: Spain
- Parent range: Baetic System

Sierra Minera de Cartagena-La Unión is a mountainous formation that extends along 26 km of coastline from the city of Cartagena in the west to Cape Palos in the east, through the municipality of La Unión, in the Region of Murcia in Spain. Its maximum elevation is located on the Sancti Spíritus hill near Portmán, at 431 m altitude.

This mountain range was intensely exploited for its silver and lead mines and other metallic minerals in ancient times. The control over these mining resources was one of the main causes of the establishment of the Carthaginians in southern Spain and the subsequent Roman occupation. The prosperity generated by mining made the city of Carthago Nova, now Cartagena, one of the most flourishing in Roman Hispania, until the end of the 1st century, due to the depletion of the best deposits, along with the scarce Roman technology, it was abandoned.

The mines were not exploited again until the 19th century, when new industrial technologies made mineral production in the Sierra de Cartagena profitable again, and there was a new mining and related industries boom. After the Spanish Civil War, extensive open-pit mining was introduced, which caused serious environmental problems until mining activities ceased definitively in 1990.

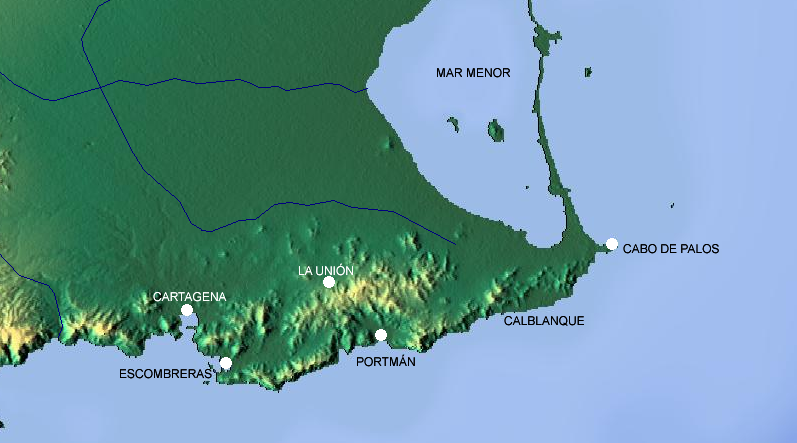
Location of the Sierra Minera in the Region of Murcia.

As a consequence of this long historical process of industrial exploitation, the landscape of the Sierra de Cartagena-La Unión is marked and transformed by centuries of intense human activity and treasures valuable cultural, archaeological and industrial testimonies of its mining past. For all these reasons, it has been declared a good of cultural interest (in Spanish: Bien de Interés Cultural) with the category of historic site.

== Geological origin ==
=== Orogeny ===
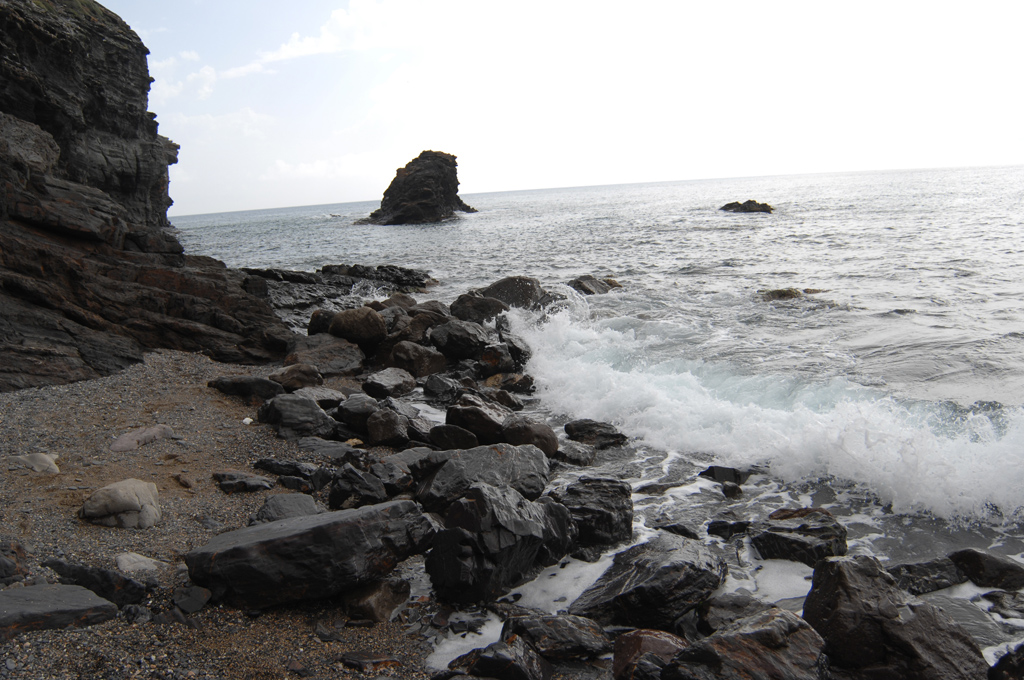
Paleozoic schists at Cabo de Palos.

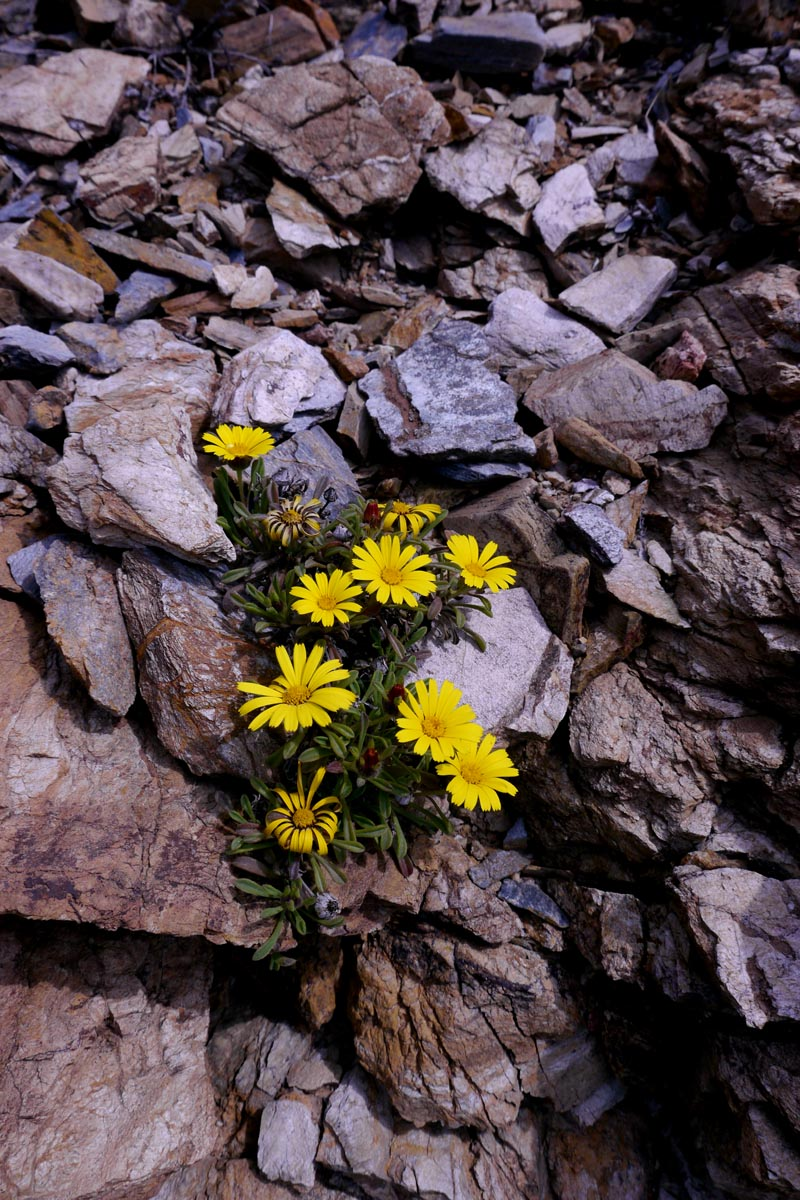
Asteriscus maritimus on Paleozoic mica-schists in El Gorguel.

The Sierra Minera is part of the last eastern foothills of the Baetic mountain ranges, which arose in the Cenozoic during the so-called Alpine orogeny, due to the collision of the Mesomediterranean microplate with the Iberian plate. Geologically, the Sierra Minera is composed of two superimposed tectonic units:

- A very old one belonging to the snow-phyllabid complex, originated during the Paleozoic and composed of metamorphic materials, mainly mica-schists. It appears in the form of very dark slate-like rocks in the easternmost part of the highlands, in the surroundings of Calblanque, Cala Reona and Cabo de Palos.
- Another more modern section, formed during the Triassic and corresponding to the alpujárride complex that is superimposed in the form of a mantle to the previous one. It is composed of metamorphic and sedimentary rocks, mainly limestone. It arises in the center of the highlands, in the Monte de las Cenizas, and extends westward through the area of Portmán, La Unión, the Sierra de la Fausilla and reaches the port of Cartagena.

=== Volcanic origin of the mineral deposits ===
During the Late Miocene, the Campo de Cartagena suffered one of the most recent episodes of volcanism in the Iberian Peninsula. About seven million years ago, numerous volcanic eruptions began to occur throughout the area, the remains of which are: the islands of the Mar Menor, Isla Grosa, El Carmolí or Cabezo Beaza. The last eruptions took place only one million years ago, in the Cabezo Negro de Tallante.

Associated with this volcanic activity, powerful hydrothermal processes were generated, where water from the interior of the Earth, with presence of dissolved minerals, subjected to strong pressures and high temperatures, precipitated these minerals in the faults and cavities of the mountain range, and gave rise to rich veins of metallic minerals.

=== Mineral deposits and mineralogy ===
The mineralogy of the Sierra de Cartagena-La Unión is quite complex, and the exploitation of the deposits has had different approaches depending on the time. In Roman and pre-Roman times, the main mineral was silver, contained in the argentiferous galena and gossan. Along with it, enormous quantities of lead were extracted, but lead-rich slag was also abandoned. Between the end of Roman exploitation and the 19th century, mining was sporadic, mainly to obtain galena for pottery (alcohol for potters) or even amethysts, of reasonable quality in the context of European deposits, before the exploitation of South American deposits. In the 19th century, the exploitation of lead was resumed from the old slags, then from the secondary minerals (anglesite and cerussite) despised by the Romans, and finally from galena, obtaining also silver. Zinc was obtained since the mid 19th century from oxidized minerals, the so-called calamines (smithsonite and hemimorphite) and since the beginning of the 20th century also from sphalerite. Iron ores (limonite and siderite) were also extracted in many mines, especially when they contained manganese (mixtures of goethite and pyrolusite). At certain times tin ore (cassiterite) was also extracted in some specific mines, as well as copper ores (mainly in prehistoric times) and baryte. From the mineralogical point of view, the Sierra minera de Cartagena-La Unión has produced remarkable specimens of most of the exploited species, and other minerals without industrial value, but of scientific interest, such as greenalite, vivianite or ludlamite.

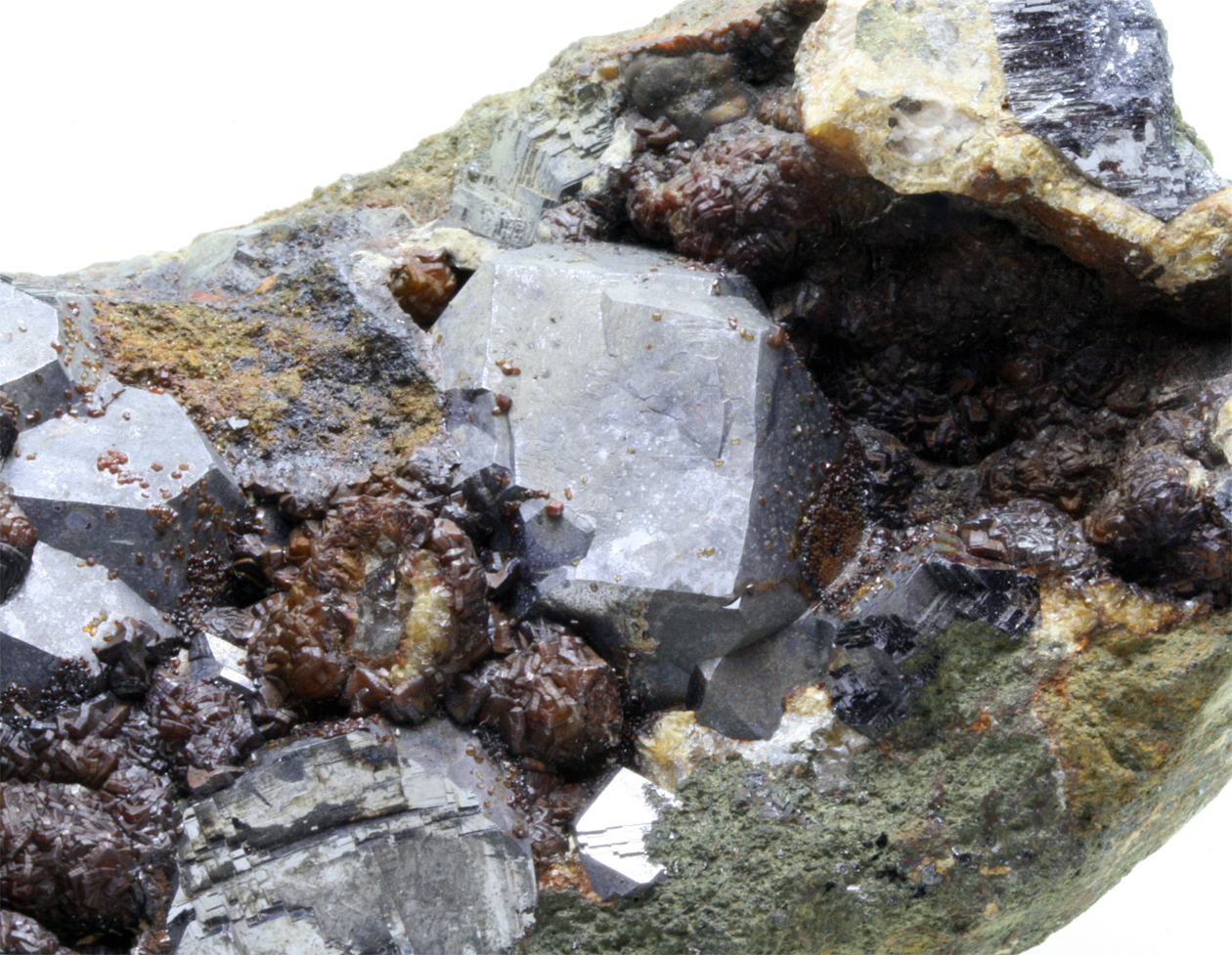
Galena crystals with siderite and greenalite. Corta San Valentin, Cartagena.

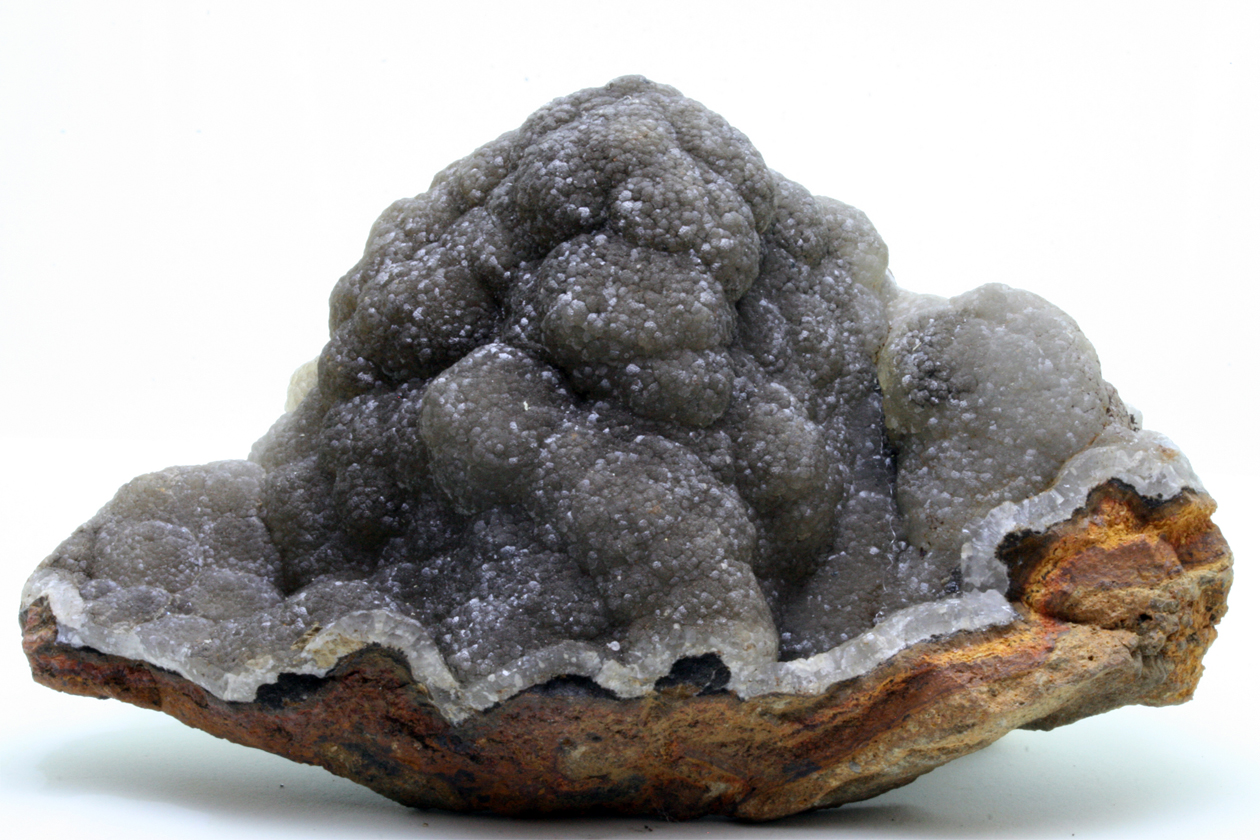
Smithsonite on iron oxides, Lirio Mine, Cartagena.

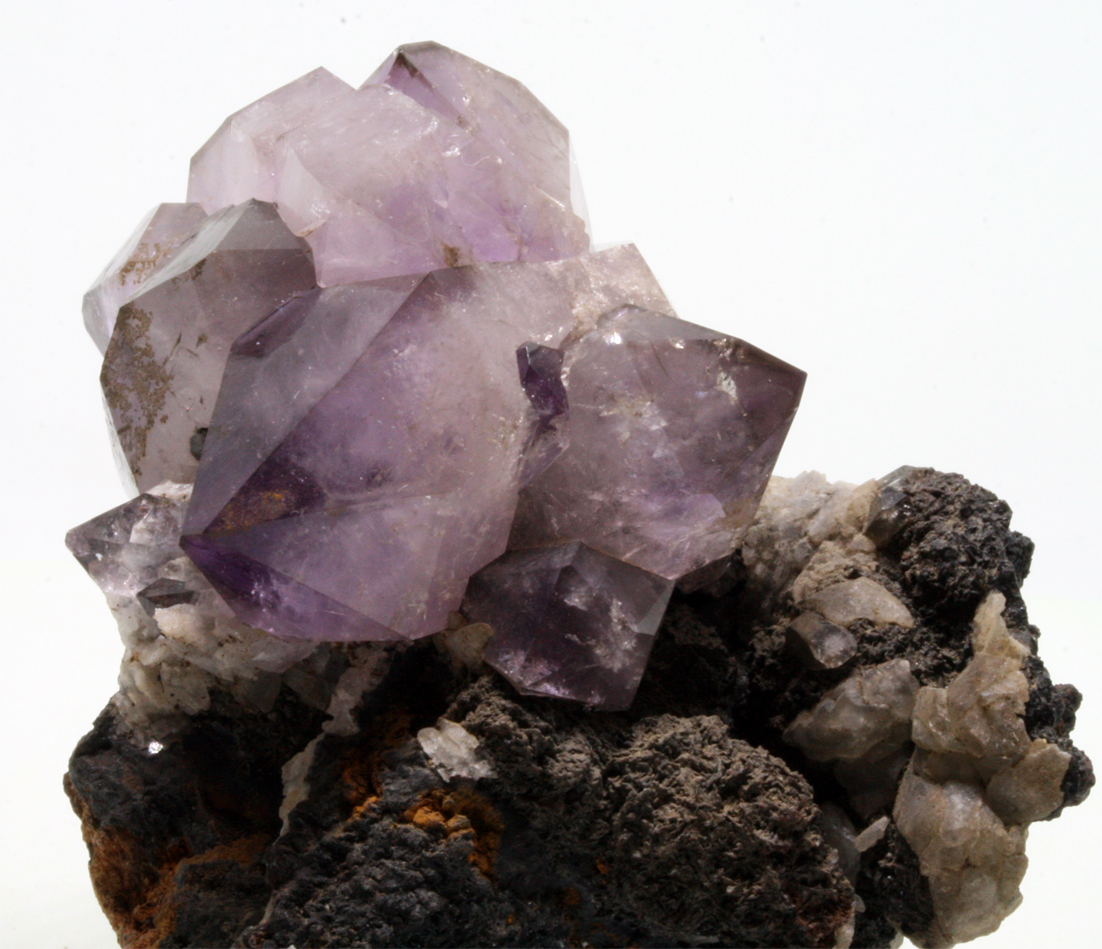
Amethyst crystals on manganese oxides. Catón Mine, Cartagena.

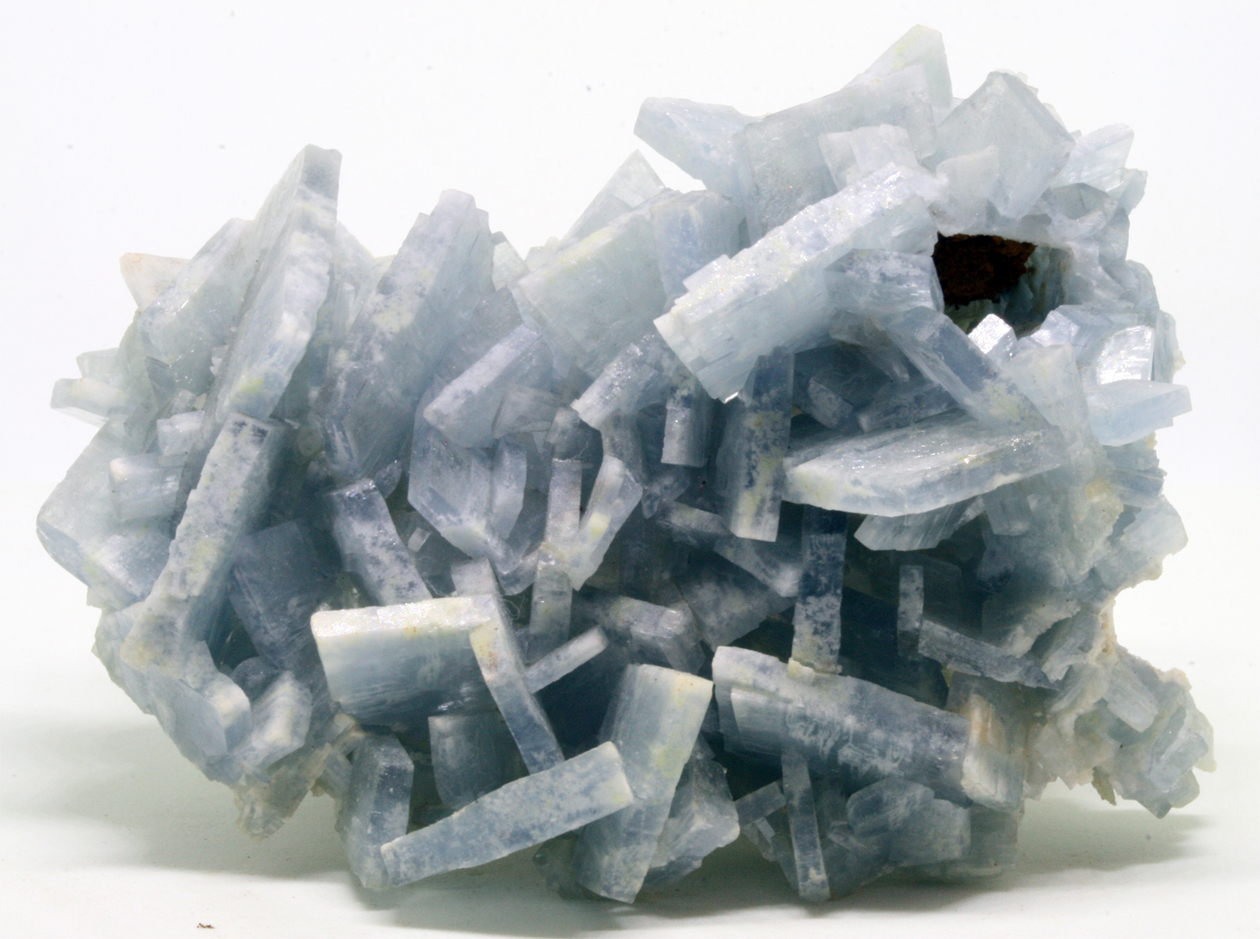
Baryte, Teresita mine, Cartagena.

== Mines of Cartagena in antiquity ==
=== Archaeological evidence ===
The earliest archaeological evidence of mining in the southeast comes from the numerous Phoenician shipwrecks that attest to commercial exchanges of mineral products with the East from the 7th century BC. Proof of this commercial traffic is, for example, the cargo of a sunken Phoenician ship found on the island of Grosa, near Cape Palos, consisting of lead and tin ingots together with Punic artefacts and elephant tusks with Phoenician inscriptions. This cargo is preserved in the National Museum of Subaquatic Archaeology in Cartagena.

An exceptional site also on display at the National Museum of Subaquatic Archaeology is that of the Phoenician ships of Mazarrón, whose lead cargo, although not exactly from the mining area of Cartagena, demonstrates the existence of mining operations in the region since the 7th century BC.

The first archaeological evidence of a settlement dedicated to mining in the highlands dates back to the Iberian period, since in the town of Los Nietos, next to the Mar Menor, a settlement was discovered in the 1960s that in the 4th century BC served as a commercial base for the area, where products derived from mining were exchanged for goods from Greece, Campania and the eastern Mediterranean.

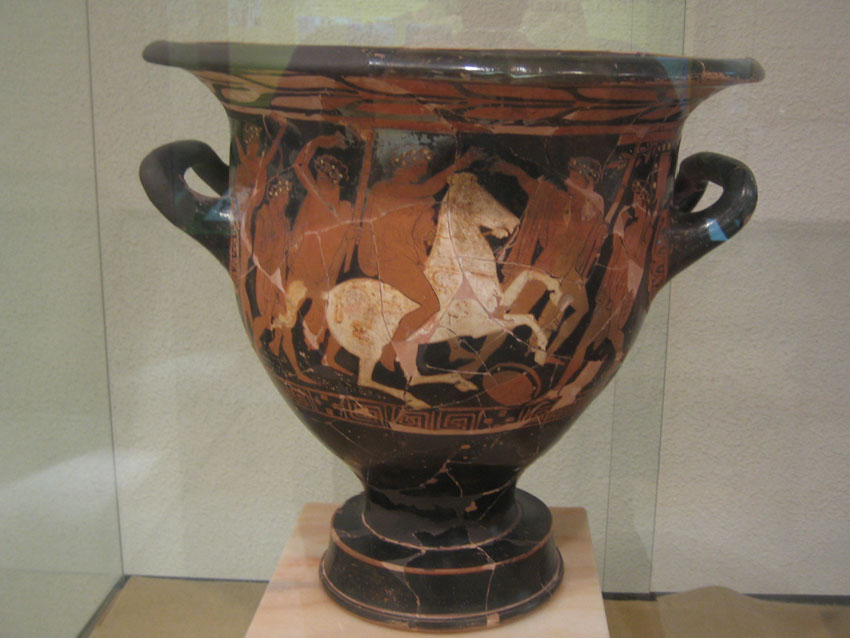
Greek krater of the Iberian mining settlement of Los Nietos. Archaeological Museum of Cartagena.

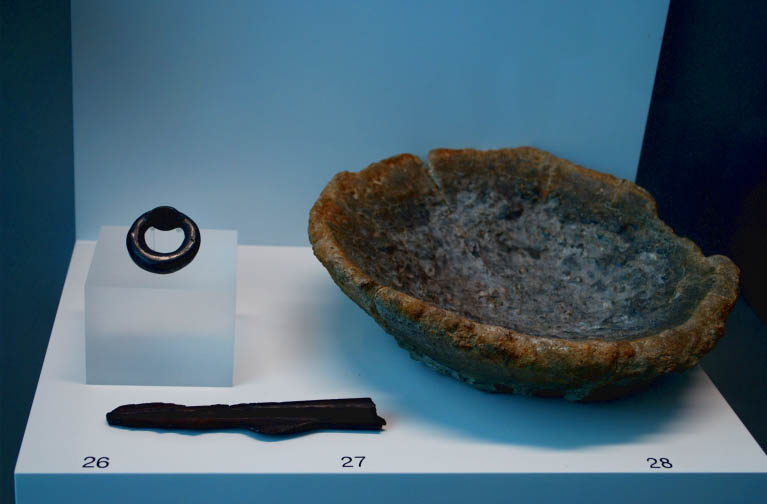
Lead ore cake from the Phoenician shipwreck of Mazarron. ARQUA.

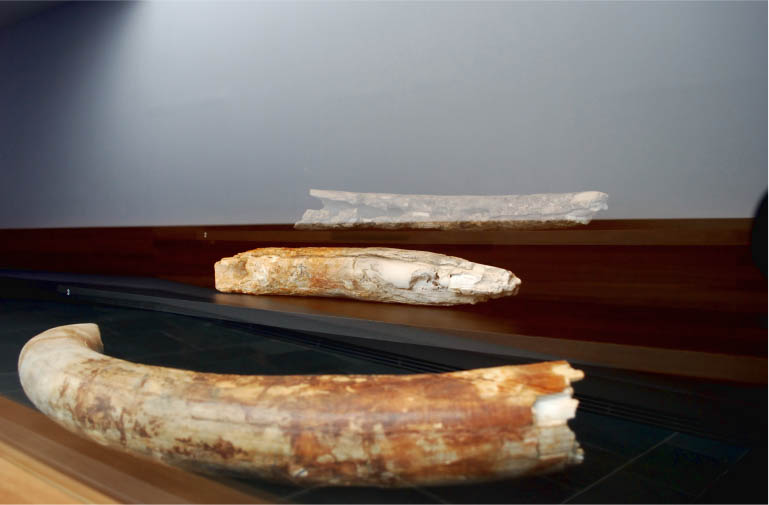
Elephant tusks with Phoenician inscriptions. ARQUA.

=== Carthaginian dominion over the mines of Cartagena ===
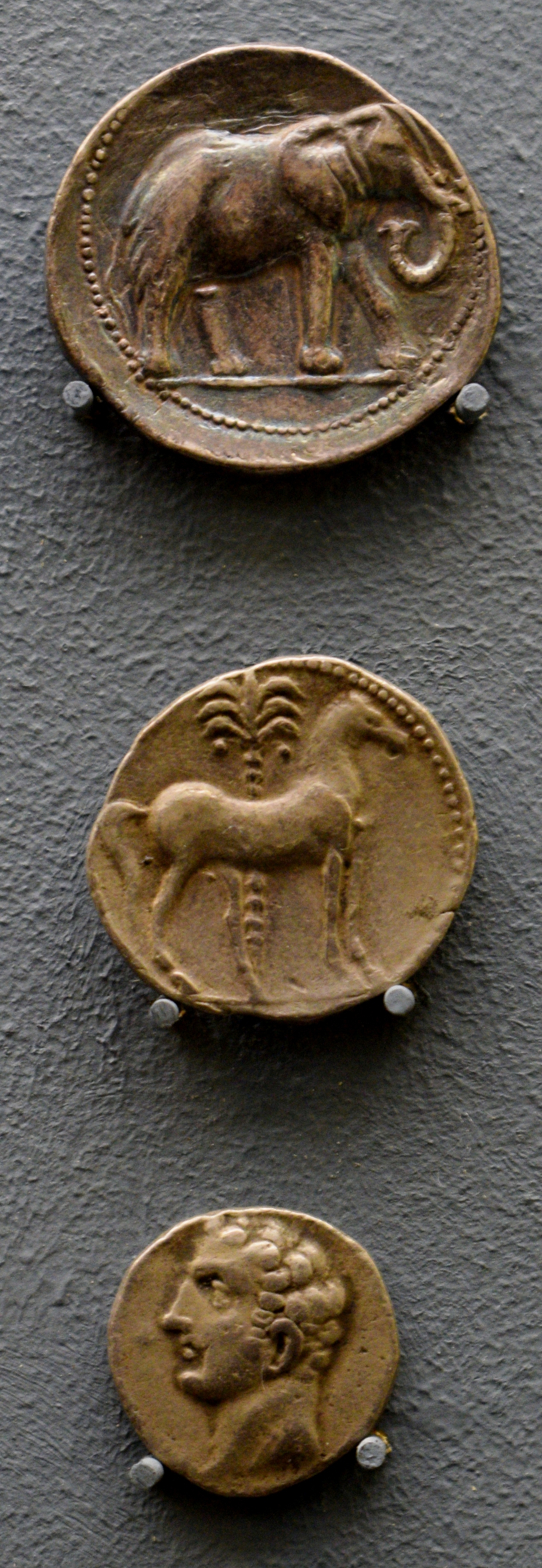
Set of Carthaginian silver coins, one of them with the probable effigy of Hamilcar Barca, minted in Cartagena. Collection of the Albacete Provincial Museum.

According to some historians, such as the well-known archaeologist Adolf Schulten, the establishment of the Carthaginians in the southeast of the Iberian Peninsula and the foundation of the city of Qart Hadasht, today's Cartagena, in 227 BC by Hasdrubal had as its main objective the control of the wealth generated by the silver mines of Cartagena.

With the silver from the mines of Cartagena they paid their mercenaries, and, when by the capture of Cartagena in 209 BC Carthago lost these treasures, Hannibal was no longer able to resist the Romans, so that the capture of Cartagena also decided Hannibal's war.

Adolf Schulten, Fontes Hispaniae Antiquae.

With this silver would most probably have been produced the minting in the city of a well-known series of Carthaginian coins with the effigies of the Barca family found in Mazarrón and in other points of the Levant in the 19th century.

=== Mines of Carthago Nova in classical sources ===
Mentions of the mineral abundance of all Hispania are constant in the descriptions of the Peninsula made by classical historians in antiquity. The extraordinary richness of the silver mines of Carthago Nova immediately attracted the attention of Greek and Roman geographers. The first written references that refer specifically to the mines of Carthago Nova come from the historian Polybius of Megalopolis, who visited the area in 147 BC. After describing the city in detail, the writer relates the existence of a hill with a temple dedicated to Aletes, discoverer of the silver mines.

The other elevations of the terrain, simply a few hills, surround the northern part of the city. Of these three, the one facing east is called Hephaestus', the next one, that of Aletes, a personage who, it seems, obtained divine honors for having discovered the silver mines.

Polybius, Histories 10, 11.1.

A century later, the geographer Strabo, paraphrasing Polybius, describes the silver mines of Carthago Nova at slightly greater length.

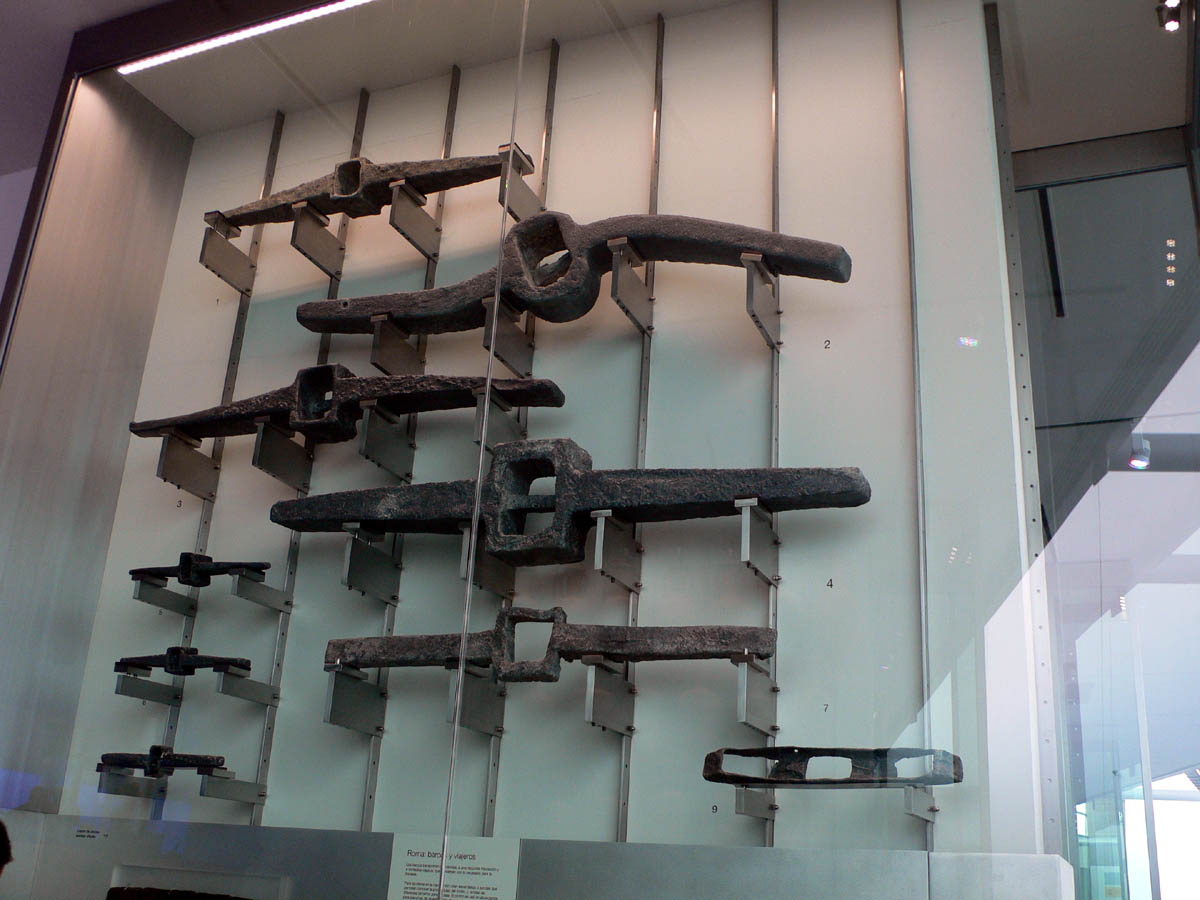
Roman lead anchors. ARQUA.

Polybius, in mentioning the silver mines of Carthago Nova, says that they are very large, that they are about twenty stadia ('about four km') from the city, that they occupy an area of four hundred stadia ('about seventy-five km'), that forty thousand workers work in them and that in his time they brought the Roman people 25,000 drachmas a day. And I omit all that he relates of the working process, because it is too long to describe; but not that concerning the argentiferous gangue carried by a stream, which, he says, is crushed and separated from the water by means of sieves; the sediments are crushed again and again filtered and, thus separated from the water, crushed once more. Then, this fifth sediment is melted and, separated from the lead, pure silver remains. At present the silver mines are still active; but here, as elsewhere, they have ceased to be public. Strabo, Geographica, Book III.

Traditionally it has been considered that the following text of Diodorus of Sicily, a contemporary of Strabo, referred to the silver mines of Cartagena, although without mentioning them explicitly.

This use (of silver) being unknown among the natives of the country, the Phoenicians used it for their commercial gains, and when they realized this they acquired the silver in exchange for small goods. Thus the Phoenicians who carried it as far as Greece and Asia, and all other peoples, acquired great wealth. To such an extent did the merchants strive in their eagerness for profit that when there was plenty of silver left over because the ships were full of cargo, they substituted silver for the lead in the anchors.

Diodorus of Sicily (Bibliotheca historica V, 35, 4–5).

=== Exploitation of the mines of Carthago Nova during the Roman domination ===
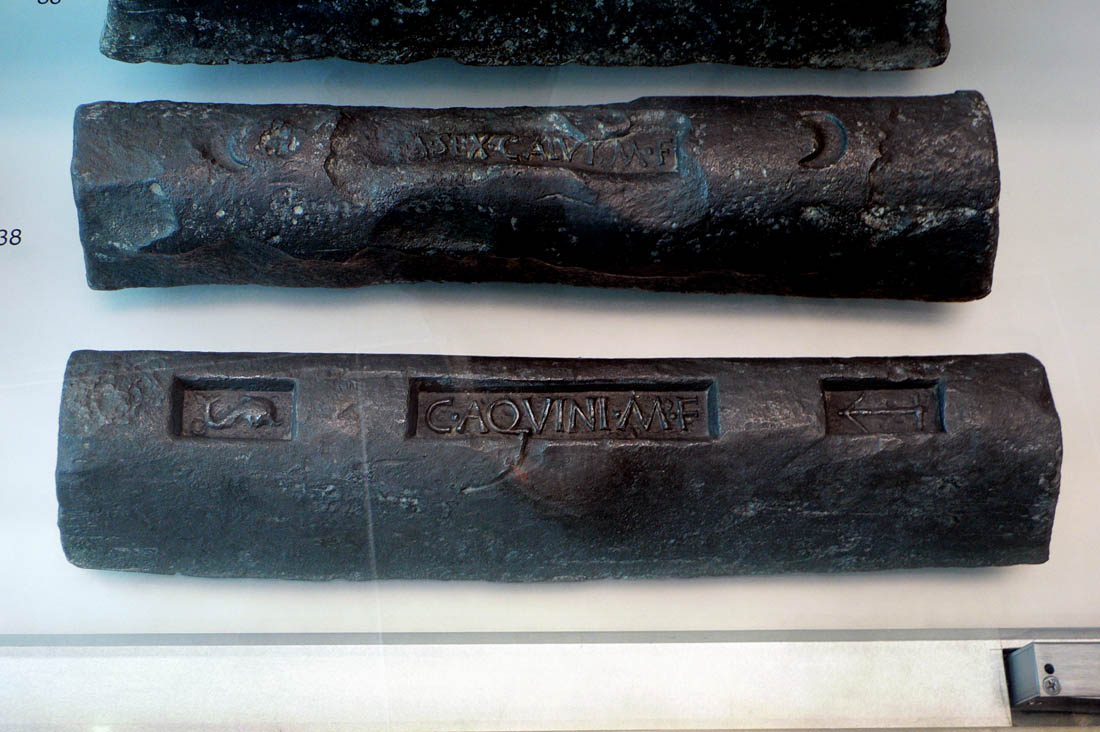
Roman lead ingots found in the port of Cartagena. ARQUA.

In 209 BC, in the context of the Second Punic War, Scipio Africanus, motivated by the interest of taking control of the silver production of Cartagena, conquered the city of Qart Hadasht for the Roman Republic, renaming it Carthago Nova and granting it the status of municipium.

At first, the workings of the mines were under the direct control of the State. Rome exploited the mines of Cartagena using both the underground mining and "open-pits". From this period comes the famous Cabezo Rajao mine, where a superficial vein of argentiferous galena was emptied, leaving a large crack in the mountain, the origin of its current etymology.

As already mentioned in Strabo's text, up to forty thousand slaves worked in the extraction of the mineral in very poor human conditions.

Those who work in the mines provide their owners with incredible profits, while they exhaust their bodies working day and night, under the earth, in the galleries, and many die from excessive suffering. There is no rest or respite for them in their work. On the contrary, they are forced by the whips of the foremen to endure a terrible series of pains that miserably end their lives. Some, who resist for a long time by the power of their body or by the courage of their spirit, endure the sufferings for a long period; but for them death is preferable to life. Such is the magnitude of their sufferings.

Diodorus of Sicily, Bibliotheca historica.

Although the intense and extensive mining activity of the 19th and 20th centuries erased many of the archaeological sites of ancient mining, throughout the mining area and around the Campo de Cartagena there are still numerous traces of mining in antiquity. These archaeological remains can be classified into four types:

- Mining operations and establishments. It includes shafts and galleries, as well as open pit mines, earthworks and slag heaps. Most of the deposits are concentrated in the area of the aforementioned Cabezo Rajao and on the Sancti Spíritus hill.
- Ore treatment facilities, such as ore washing facilities, mills for crushing the rock and tailings deposits.
- Foundries with their slag heaps where the ore was processed to obtain ingots.
- Living quarters for the mine workers and for the administration and storage of the mining product.

With the reactivation of the mining activity in the middle of the 19th century, the first archaeological evidence of the ancient exploitation of the mining sierra began to appear. Systematic excavations and archaeological studies, both of the Cartagena and Mazarrón mines, were not carried out exhaustively until the 1940s. The fruit of these excavations can currently be seen on display in the Municipal Archaeological Museum of Cartagena, as well as in the Archaeological Museum of La Unión, a unique collection of Roman mining tools, among which are pieces such as:

- Iron tools such as hammers, picks, wedges and bells.
- Wooden ladders and pulleys.
- Spurs, canteens and clothing —spargatas, hats, knee pads, etc.— made of esparto and chamaerops fiber.
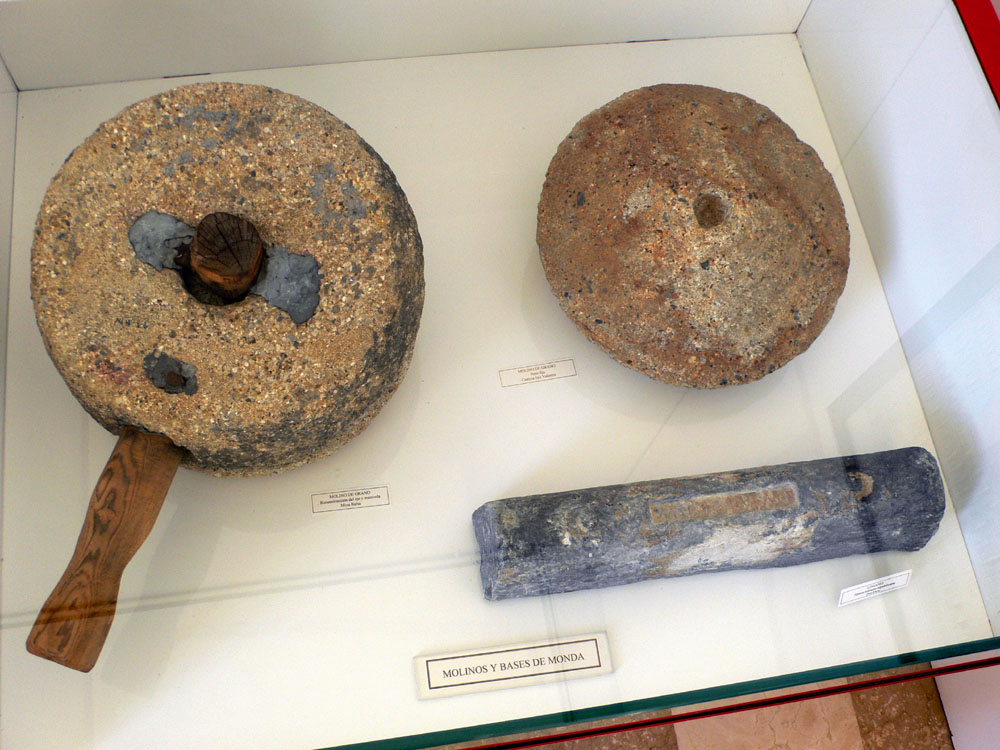
Mining tools from Roman times. Archaeological Museum of La Unión.

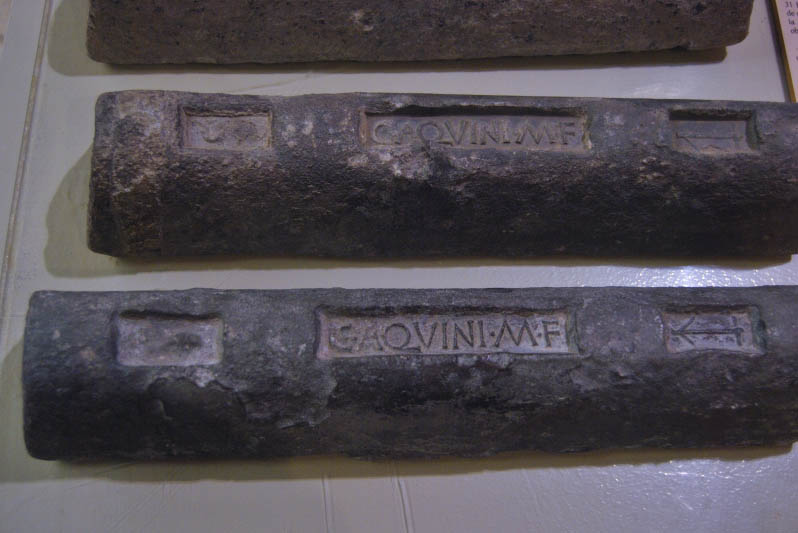
Lead ingots from the mines of Carthago Nova. Archaeological Museum of Cartagena.

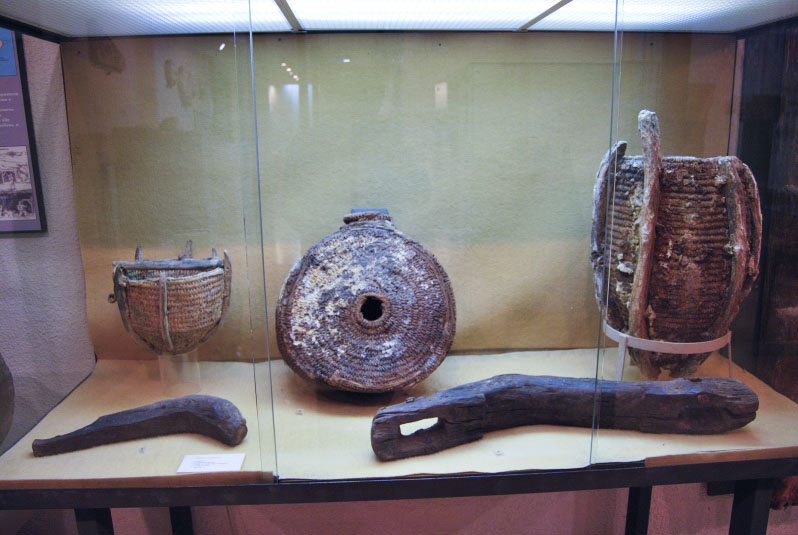
Roman mining tools made of esparto fiber. Museum Arq. of Cartagena.

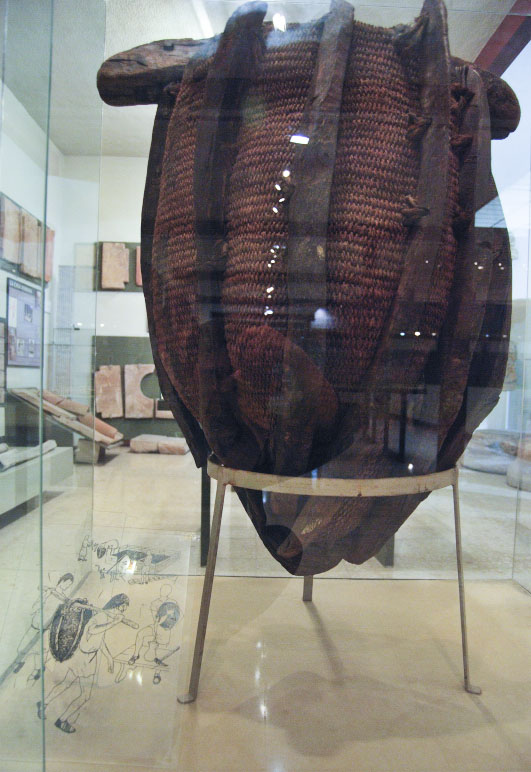
Esparto fiber basket used in the Roman mining works. Museum Arq. of Cartagena.

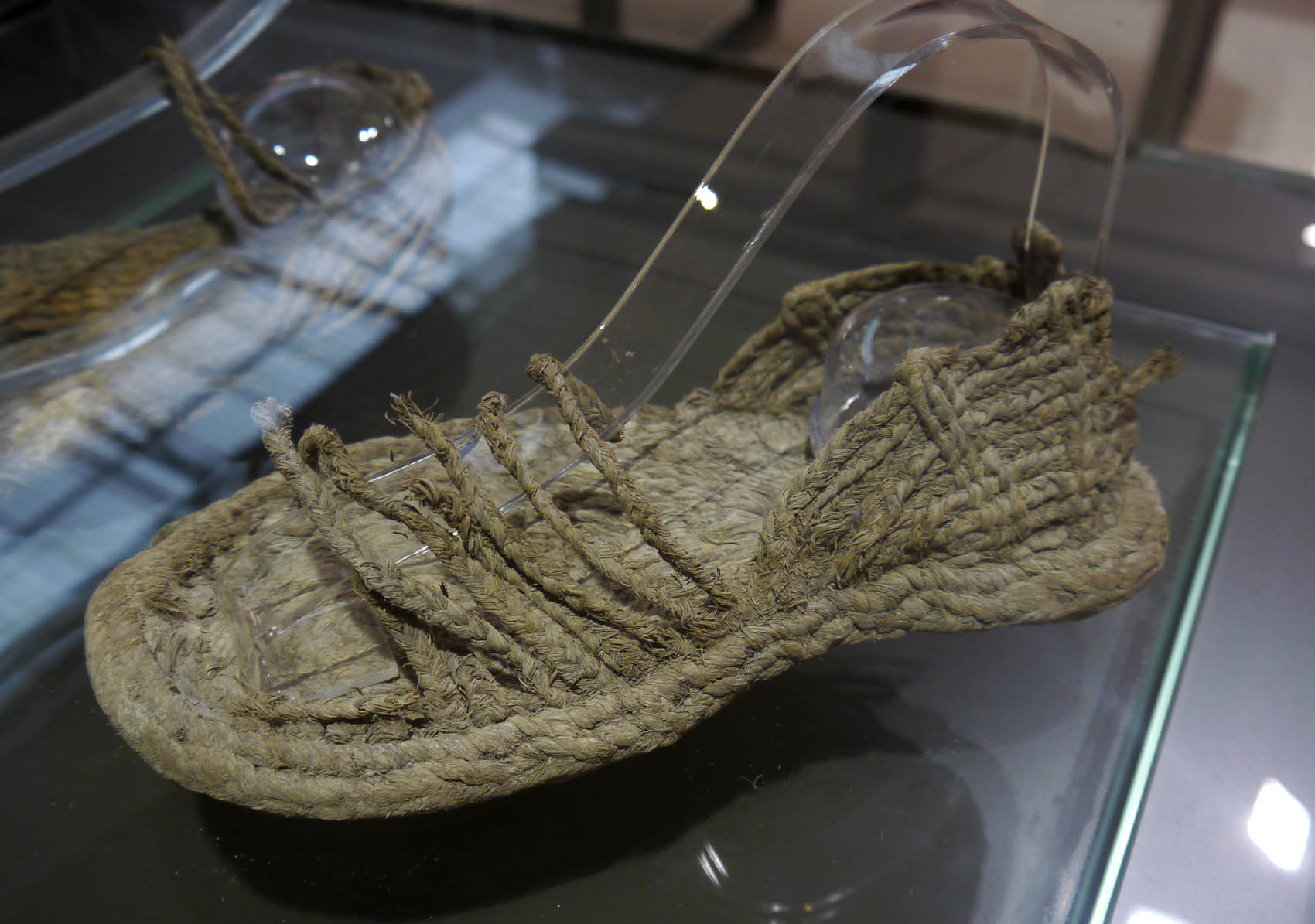
Esparto fiber espadrille used in Roman mining work. Museum Arq. of Cartagena.

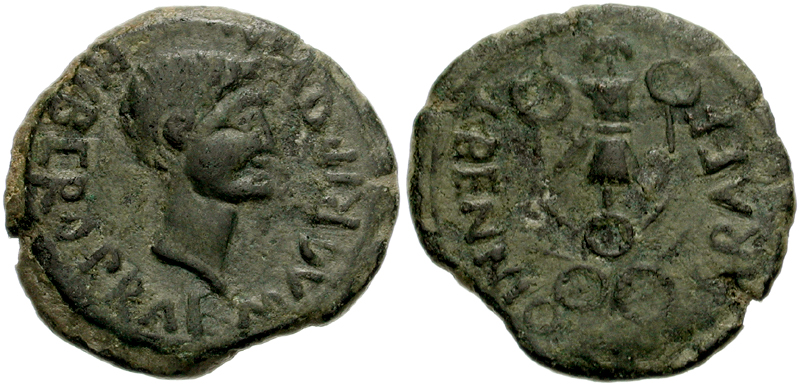
Bronze semis minted in Carthago Nova.

Carthago Nova became the economic center of mining, not only of the nearby exploitations of the Cartagena-La Unión mountain range, but also of those of Mazarrón, Águilas and mining areas of Almería —Sierra Almagrera and Sierra de Gádor—, and became one of the most prosperous cities of Roman Hispania.

The growing economic and commercial strength of the city meant that in 44 BC it was granted the title of colony under the name of Colonia Vrbs Iulia Nova Karthago (C.V.I.N.K), being the third city in Hispania to receive colonial status after Corduba and Tarraco, and during the principate of the Emperor Augustus (27 BC-14 BC), the city underwent an ambitious program of urbanization and monumentalization, which included, among other urban interventions, the construction of an impressive Roman theater and a large forum. The new colony was granted the privilege of issuing its own currency in the form of asses, semises and quadrans.

=== Depletion of mining activity in ancient times ===
During the first century, the first signs of exhaustion of the mining activity in Cartagena began to appear. The lower profitability caused the Roman state to abandon the direct exploitation of the mines and to lease them to private individuals or large private companies. Mining production continued to decline until it came to a complete standstill at the end of the 2nd century.

The end of mining led to the rapid decline of the city of Carthago Nova, the abandonment of half of the urban area and the ruin of most of the buildings constructed in the Augustan period. During the following centuries there would be no activity in the mines of Carthago Nova except in a very residual form.

== Reactivation of the mining activity ==
=== Reopening of the mines in the 19th century ===
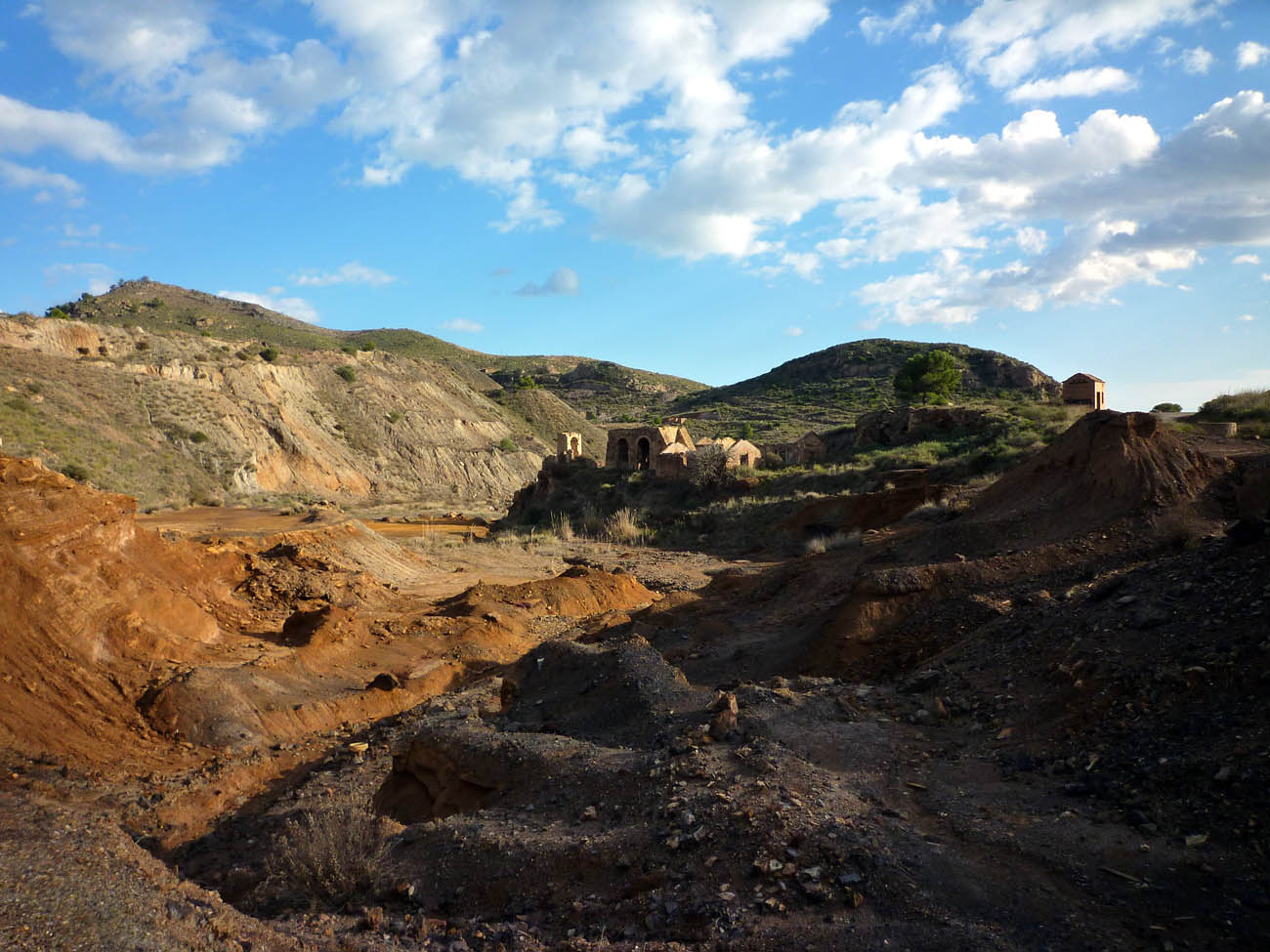
Innocente mine in El Gorguel.

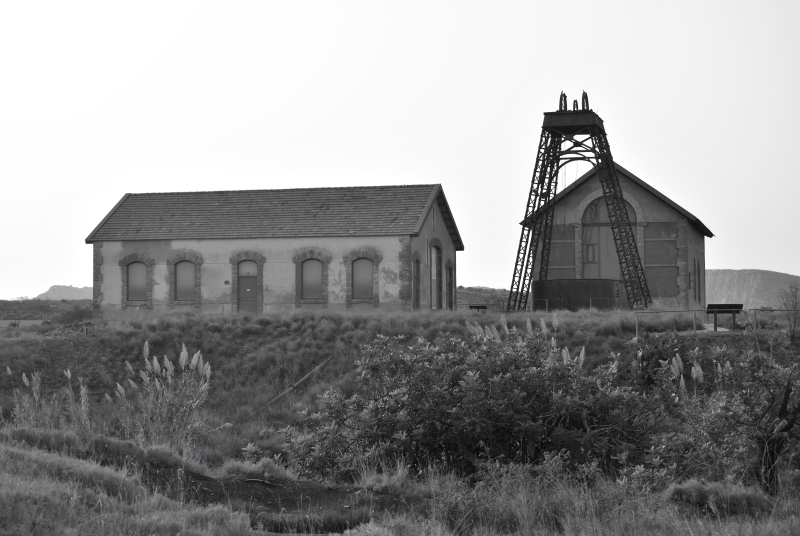
Las Matildes mine in El Llano del Beal.

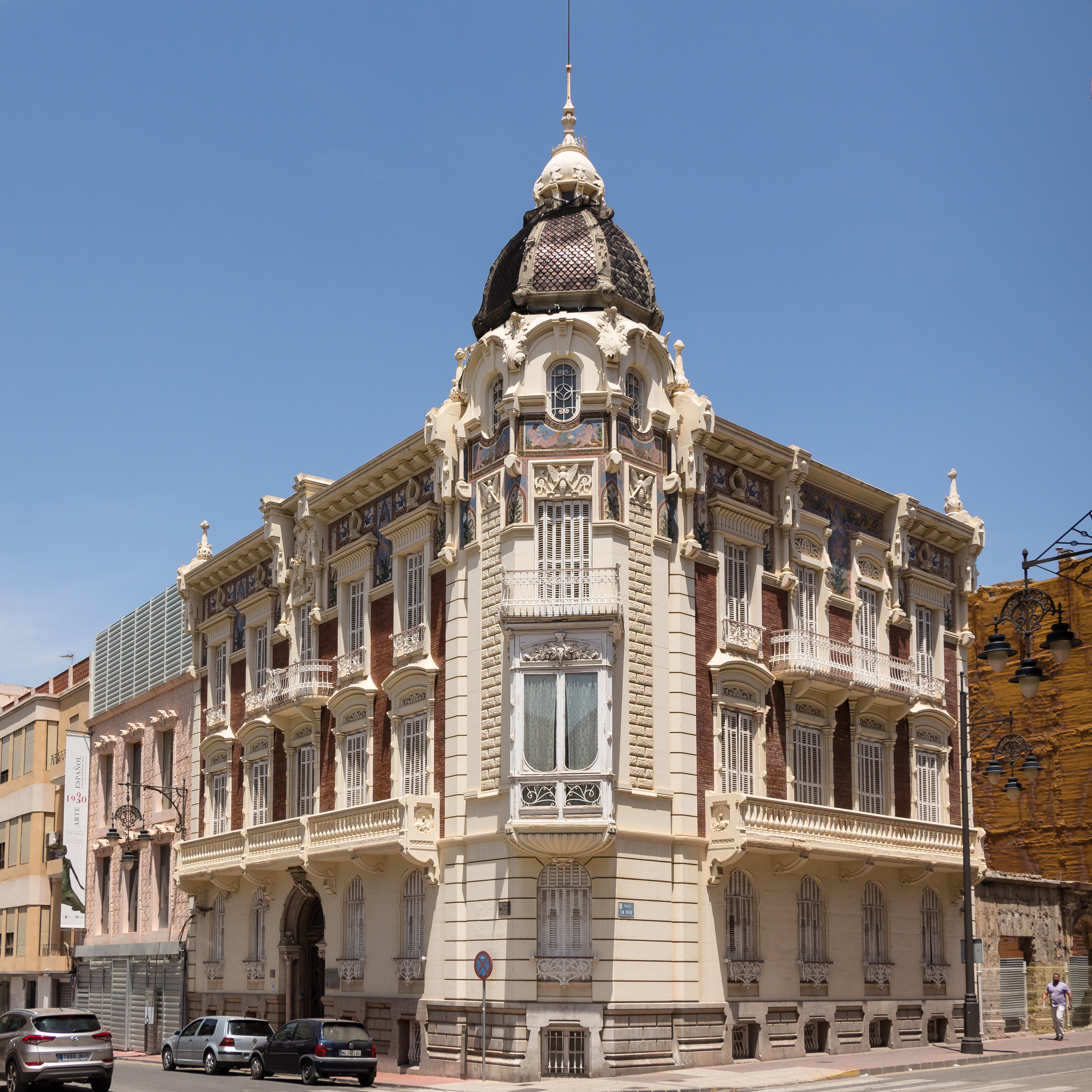
The Palace of Aguirre in Cartagena, work of the mining entrepreneur Camilo Aguirre commissioned to the modernist architect Víctor Beltrí in 1898.

During the reign of Ferdinand VII, in 1825, a transcendental event in the history of Spanish mining took place: the promulgation of the mining law that liberalized the sector and allowed mining activities to begin without the need for a license from the King. A few years later, in 1839, the very rich Jaroso vein was discovered in the Almagrera mountain range in Almería, which unleashed a genuine mining fever throughout southeastern Spain.

In Cartagena, joint stock companies began to be set up to exploit the mines. The old Roman mining shafts were reopened at the same time that a new activity appeared: the beneficiation of the old Roman slag heaps from which, with the new industrial technologies, yields were extracted from the remains of minerals that were still preserved. By 1850 there were thirty-eight silver smelting factories in Cartagena. On the other hand, the appearance of new industrial technologies made possible a new economic activity: the exploitation of lead carbonates and sulfides. Around 1860, with the arrival of the first steam engines, calamine began to be exploited, from which zinc was extracted, and finally, at the end of the 19th century, the exploitation of pyrites to obtain iron began. During the 19th century, the production of lead and zinc from the mines of Cartagena and La Unión constituted the bulk of the national production.

As a consequence of this industrial growth, the settlements and infrastructures related to mining developed in an extraordinary way:

- New population centers emerged, such as El Estrecho de San Ginés, Llano del Beal, El Beal, El Algar, Herrerías, El Garbanzal and Portmán.
- In 1860, the towns of Herrerías and El Garbanzal became independent from the municipality of Cartagena and gave rise to the new municipality of La Unión, which also included Portmán.
- A narrow-gauge railroad line (in Spanish: Ferrocarriles Españoles de Vía Estrecha) was built between Cartagena and La Unión for the transport of ore.
- New port infrastructures were created in the port of Cartagena, Portmán and Escombreras.
- In 1862, Queen Isabel II inaugurated the Madrid-Cartagena train line.

The mining activity generated an intense immigration process of labor coming mainly from Andalusia, especially from the province of Almeria, as well as from the rest of the Murcia region.

With the wealth generated by the mining activity, a powerful bourgeoisie grew up in Cartagena, who invested their enormous fortunes in luxurious houses and palaces in the modernist style. This new architectural style completely changed the urban appearance of both the city of Cartagena and La Unión. A fundamental architect in this new urban planning process was the Catalan Víctor Beltrí with works such as the Gran Hotel, the Casa Maestre, the Casa Llagostera or the Palacio de Aguirre, all in Cartagena, or the public market in La Unión.

=== Crisis of the mining activity after the First World War ===
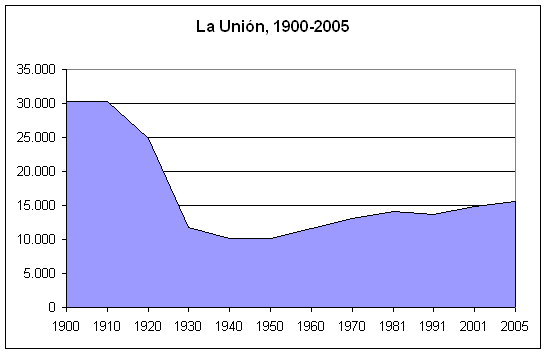
Demographic evolution of the municipality of La Unión in the 20th century. The decline of up to 2/3 of its population as a result of the mining crisis can be seen.

At the beginning of the 20th century, this golden apogee of the mining sector in Cartagena began to decline suddenly due to the appearance of strong competitors in the international market (mainly the United States and Australia) with more efficient technology than that used by local companies. Starting in 1912, the price of lead declined steadily, and the First World War worsened the problem by making it difficult to obtain fuel. This led to the closure of many mines and allowed the French capital company Peñarroya to enter the Sierra de Cartagena. Its first acquisition was the la Compañía Francesa de las Minas y Fábricas de Escombreras – Bleyberg. In 1913, it also purchased the smelting plants of the Figueroa company in Cartagena. The decline became more pronounced after 1918, the end of the First World War, as a consequence of the plummeting demand for lead, used in projectiles and armaments. Finally, with the economic crisis of 1929 and the consequent drop in international demand, mine production almost completely disappeared.

As a consequence of the closure of mining exploitations, an unprecedented depopulation took place in the municipality of La Unión, losing up to 2/3 of its inhabitants.

=== Mining after the Spanish Civil War until the end of the 20th century ===
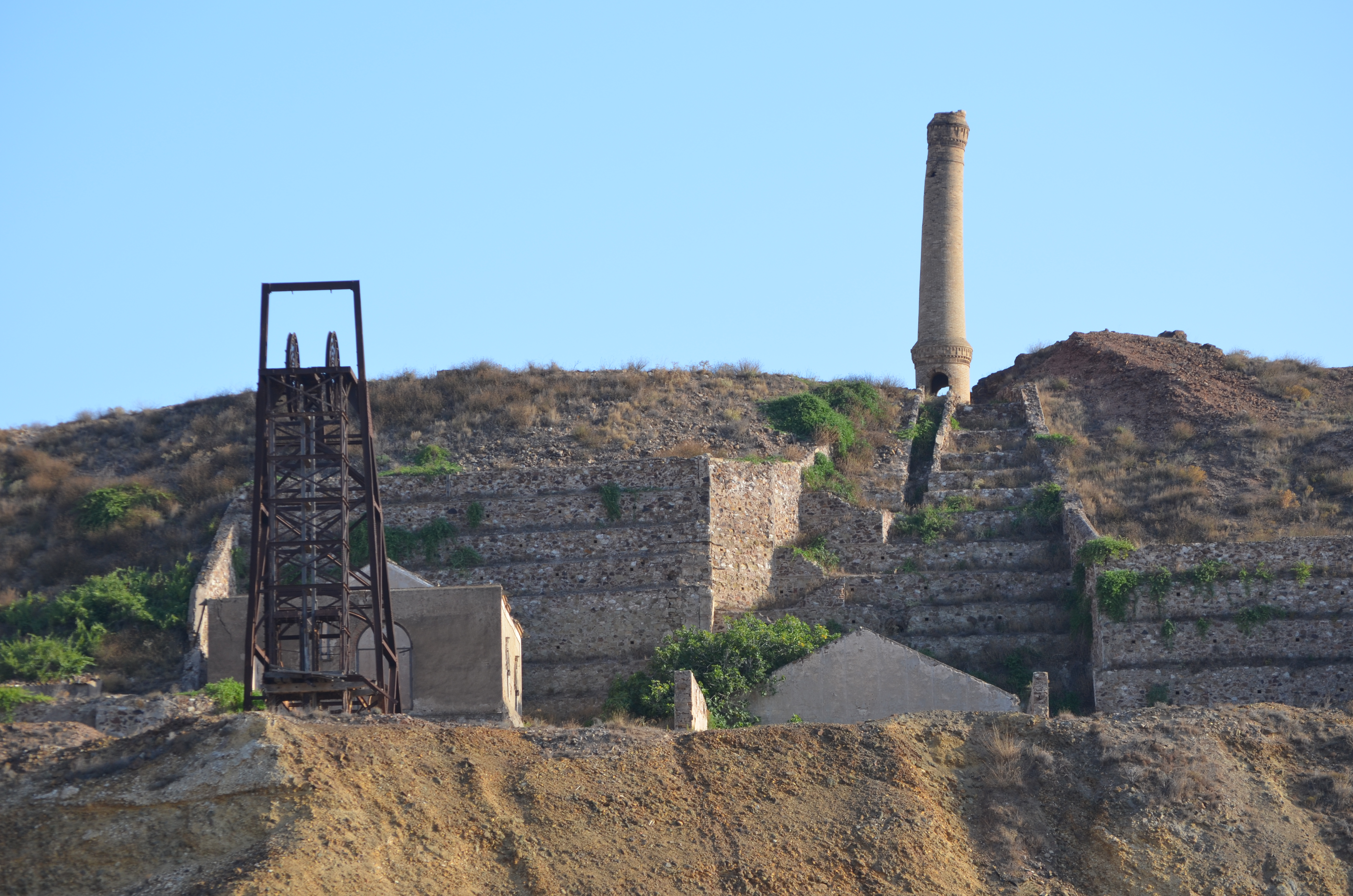
View of the Cabezo Rajao mine.

At the beginning of the 1940s, the price of lead increased due to wartime demand and mining activity was reactivated again. Peñarroya took ownership of a large part of the mining sierra. This allowed open-pit mining, which began in 1953 with the opening of the Emilia pit. In addition, the introduction of differential flotation made it possible to improve the utilization of ores. This concentration of ownership and the introduction of new mining technologies —some with serious environmental problems— allowed mining to become profitable again. All the ore was processed at the Roberto washing plant, which discharged waste directly into the sea through a pipeline. Over 35 years, about fifty million tons were dumped, almost completely filling in the Bay of Portmán. On March 31, 1990, the discharges ceased. Due to the economic crisis caused by the increase in oil prices and the depletion of the deposits, the mines were definitively closed and declared a Good of Cultural Interest, with the consideration of historical site of the Industrial Heritage of the Cartagena-La Unión Mines. The definitive declaration took place in 2015. In 1988, the Peñarroya company sold the property of all its mining operations to Portmán Golf, a real estate developer.

=== Mining in the 21st century ===
In 2008, the possibility of reopening some of the mining sites, owned by the Portmán Golf company, for the extraction of the blende required by the company Española del Zinc, was considered. This option, which aroused great rejection from the neighbors, was soon discarded.

== Environmental aspects ==
=== Original vegetation ===
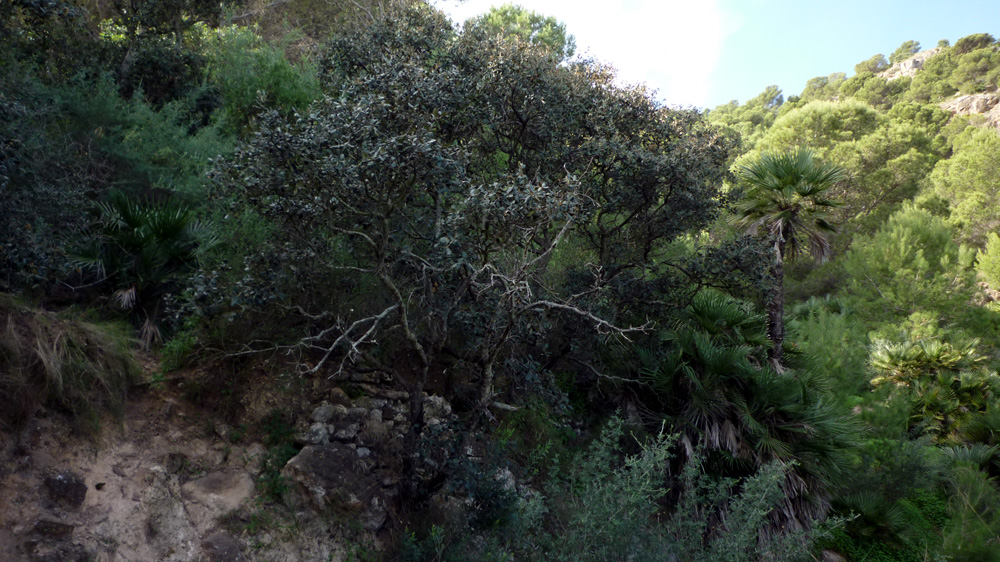
Holm oaks, palmitos and Aleppo pines in the Cabezo del Horno (Calblanque).

All the mountain ranges of Cartagena, as well as La Manga del Mar Menor, were originally covered by a thick Mediterranean maquis. This climax community would be mainly made up of mastic trees, black hawthorns, wild olive trees, palmitos and esparto grasses. Along with the above species also grow Aleppo pines, kermes oaks and Cartagena cypresses. In the most humid areas there are also holm oaks, strawberry trees and myrtles. This maquia would be inhabited by deer, wolves and wild boars.

... They said that the conservation of the mountains has been discussed many times and have been visited and that there is nowhere to plant new pines, and that in the mountains, both east and west, many of the same natural ones are raised, because the land is suitable for it, and because they have seen that it is convenient to respect that there are many new pines in the western part.

Chapter Record of the City Council of Cartagena of 1598.

In the land of Cartagena there are these mountains (...). The mountain range of Porte Mayn (Portmán) "is a good pork mountain in winter, and in these mountains there are these fountains, the Fuente del Cañaveral, the Fuente del Porte Mayn. The mountain of Cabo de Palos is a very good mountain for pork in winter, and this mountain is near the sea. And near this mountain is an island, which enters the sea: and it is about a league long, and there are many deer on it".

Libro de la montería by Alfonso XI of Castile. 14th century.

=== Biodiversity ===
The special geographical location of the municipalities of Cartagena and La Unión, as well as the particularities of its orography and climatology are the reason why the coastal mountain ranges of Cartagena concentrate one of the greatest biodiversity in Europe due to the confluence of species from different origins as well as the great richness of diverse plant communities and the presence of numerous floristic endemisms. Thus, there can be found:

- Ibero-Africanisms: Species that are distributed along the Mediterranean coast of North Africa and south of the Iberian Peninsula. These are plants that colonized southeastern Spain about 5.5 million years ago, during the so-called Messinian salinity crisis, when the Mediterranean Sea dried up completely and Europe and Africa were connected by land. This land connection allowed the arrival in Campo de Cartagena of a large number of African plant species, nowadays known as Ibero-African endemisms, such as the sandarac of Cartagena, the arto, the oroval, the jujube tree, the cornical, the manzanilla de escombreras, the tapenera de la Sierra Minera or the chumberillo de lobo.
- Typical species of the Mediterranean forest, such as the Aleppo pine, mastic, strawberry tree, kermes oak, holm oak, myrtle or palmito.
- Endemic species of the botanical province of Murcia-Almeria such as the varica of San José, the jarilla, the black garlic or the siempreviva morada.
- Endemic species exclusive to the Campo de Cartagena, such as the jara de Cartagena, the siempreviva de Cartagena, the Esparraguera del Mar Menor, the zamarilla de Cartagena or the garbancillo de Tallante.

This botanical wealth makes up one of the most important plant heritages in Europe and is mainly concentrated in the coastal mountain ranges of the Campo de Cartagena, where the humidity provided by the mists from the sea mitigates the aridity of the climate.

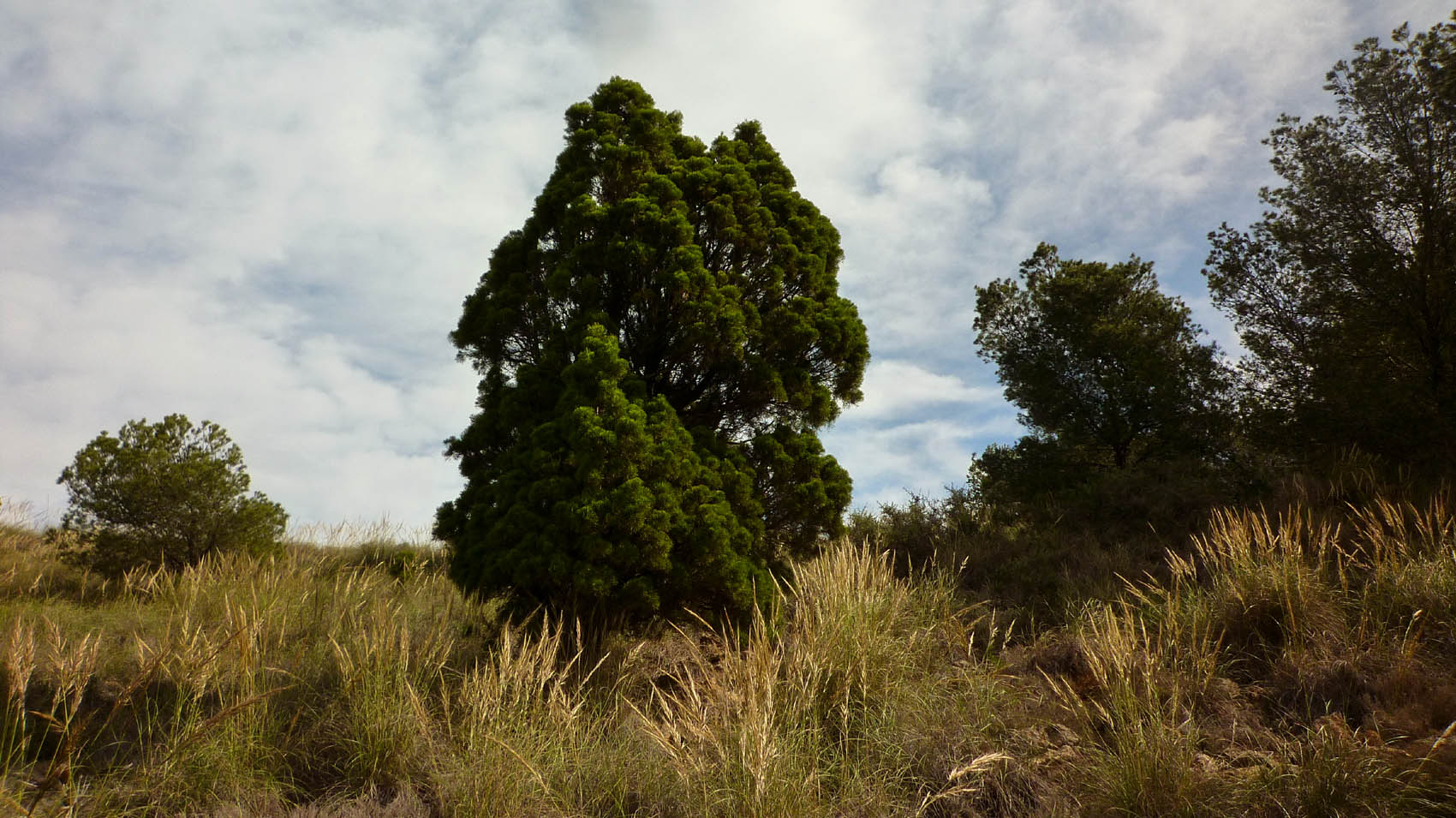
Sandarac of Cartagena

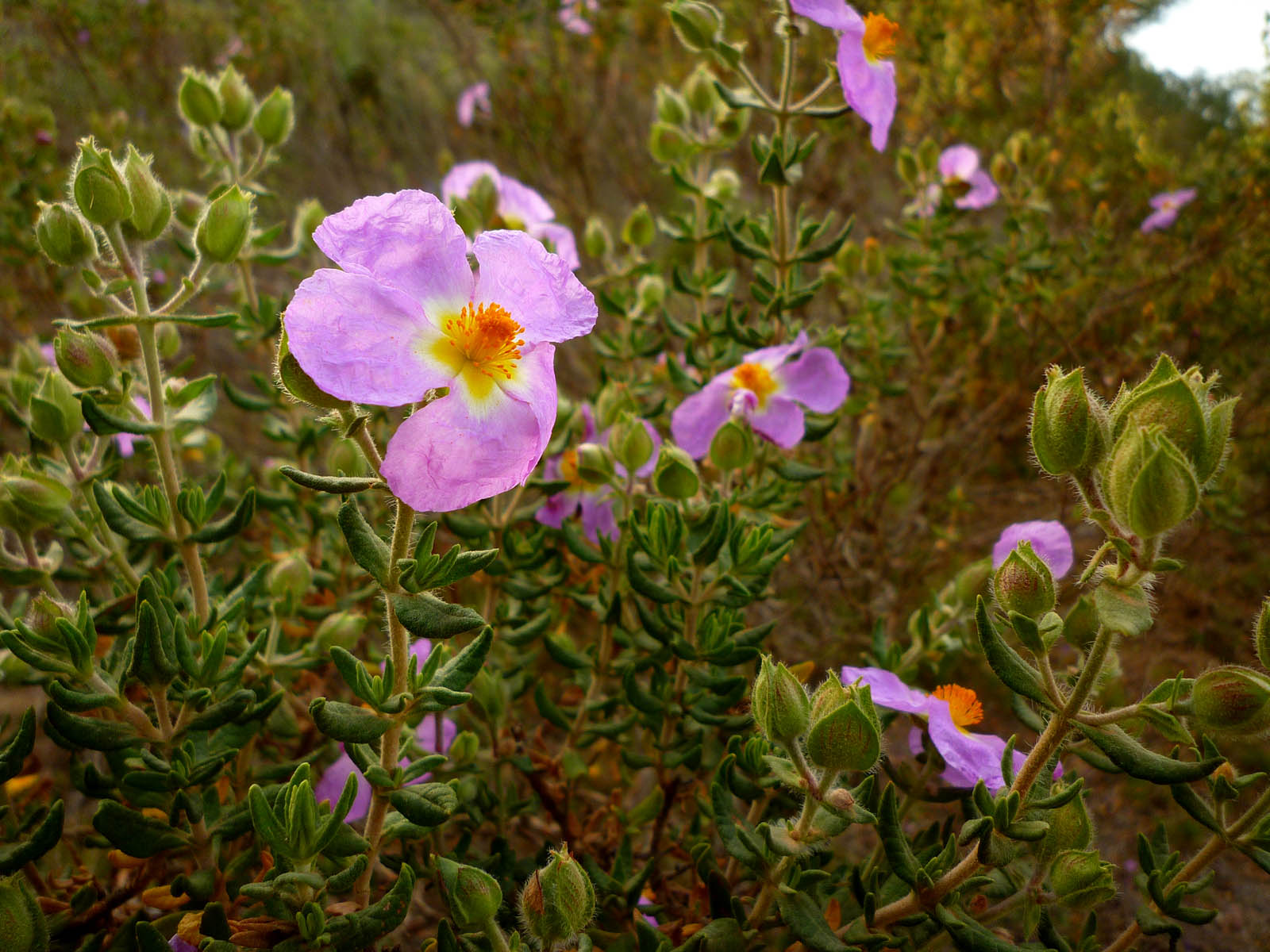
Jara de Cartagena

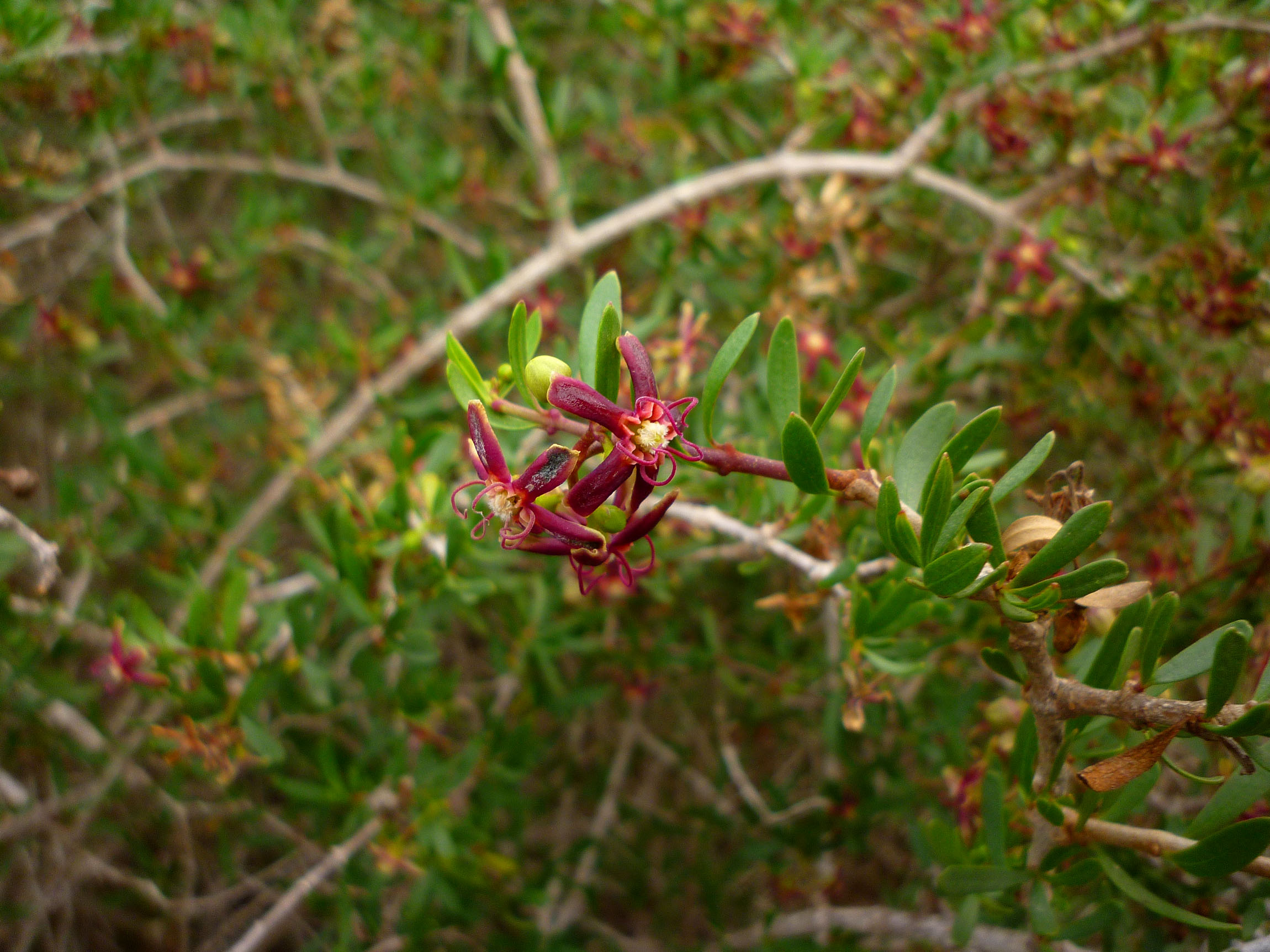
Cornical

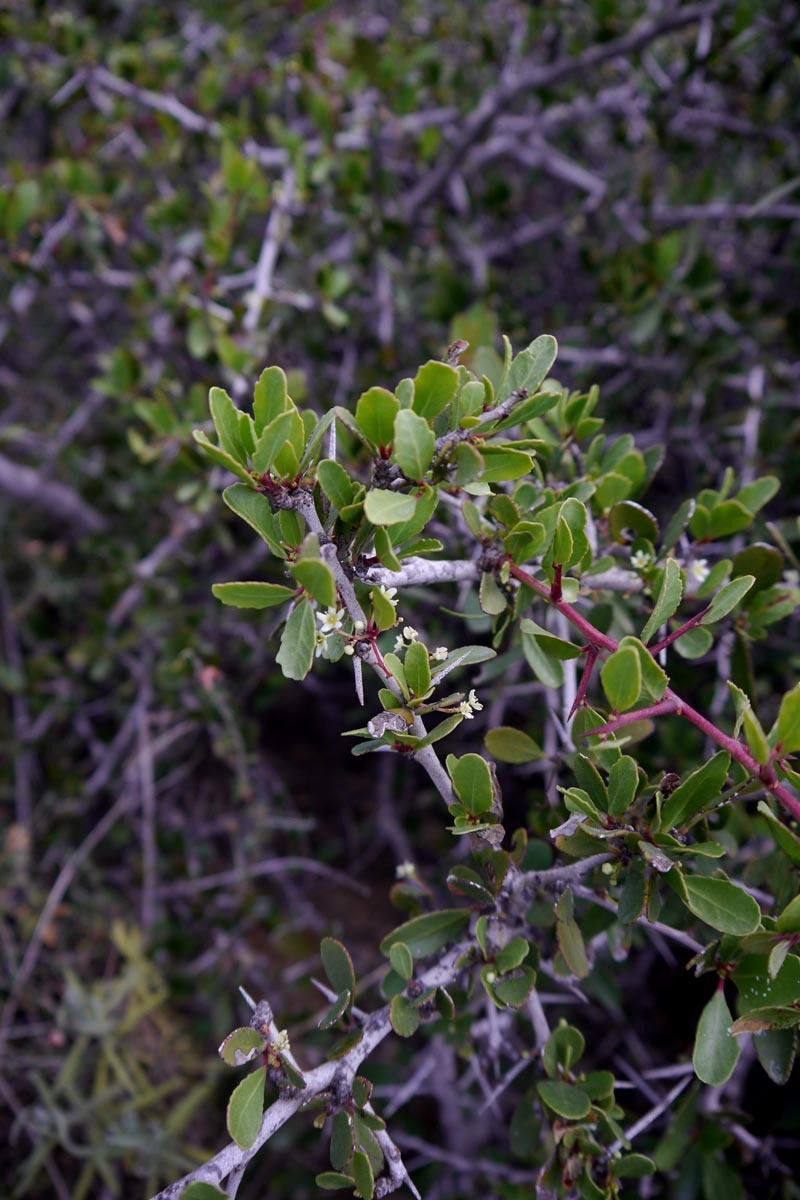
Arto

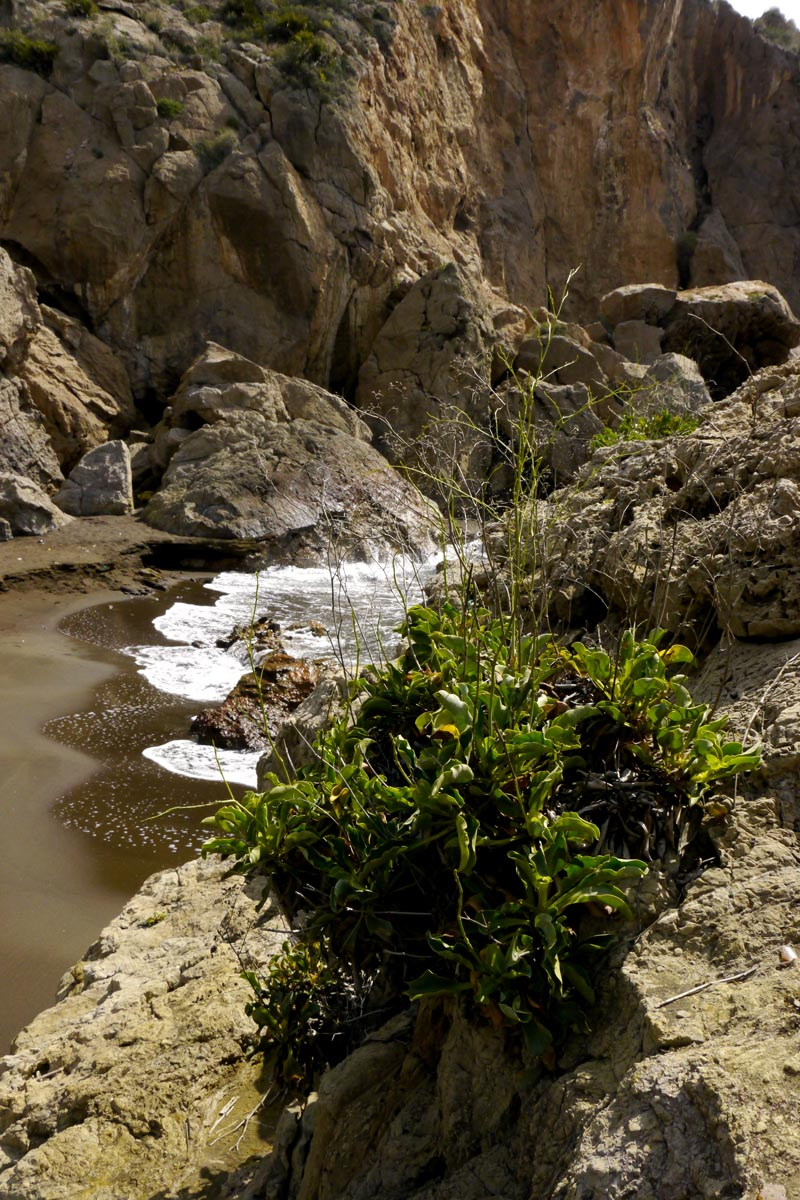
Limonium cossonianum

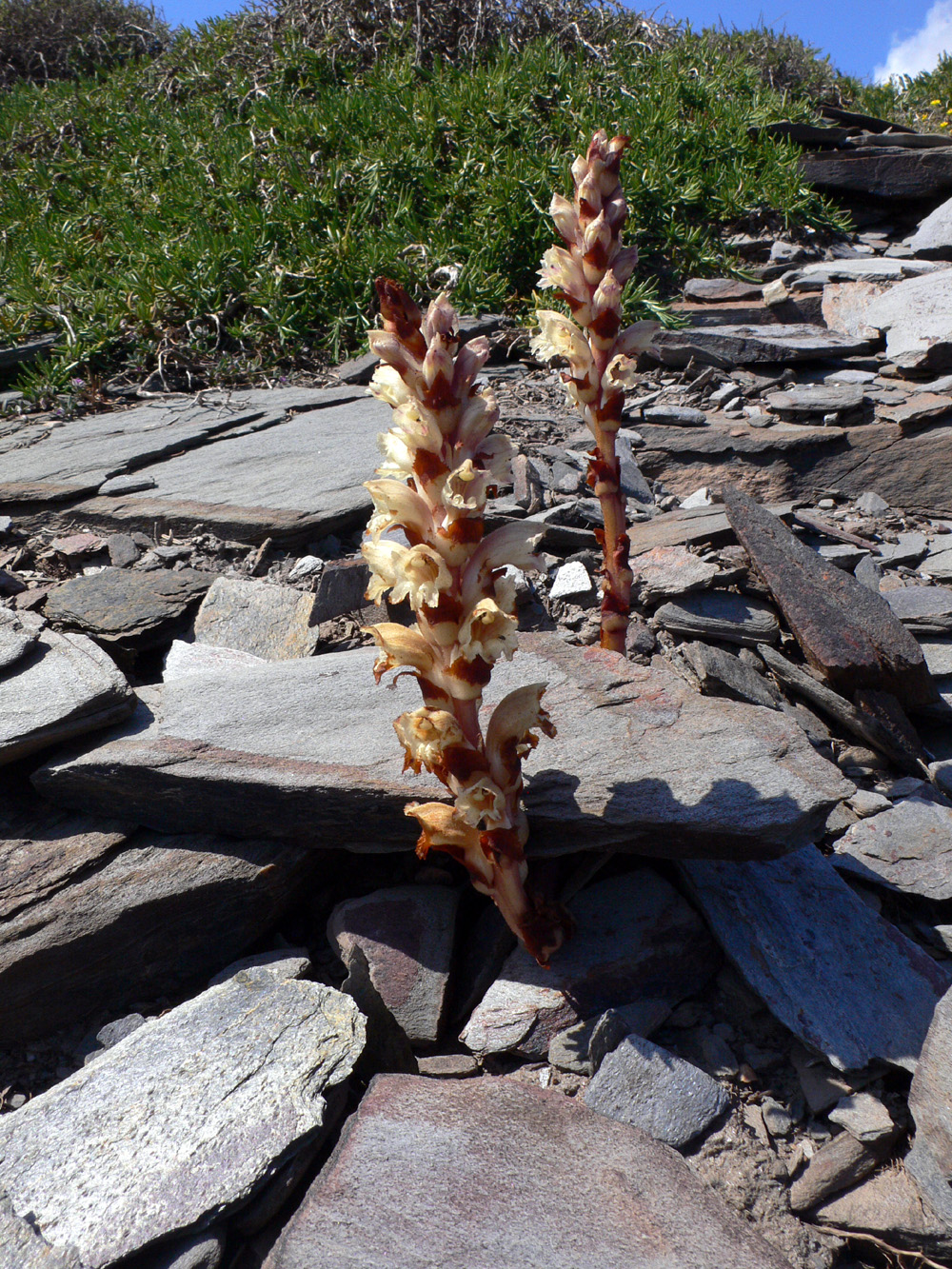
Orobanche latisquama

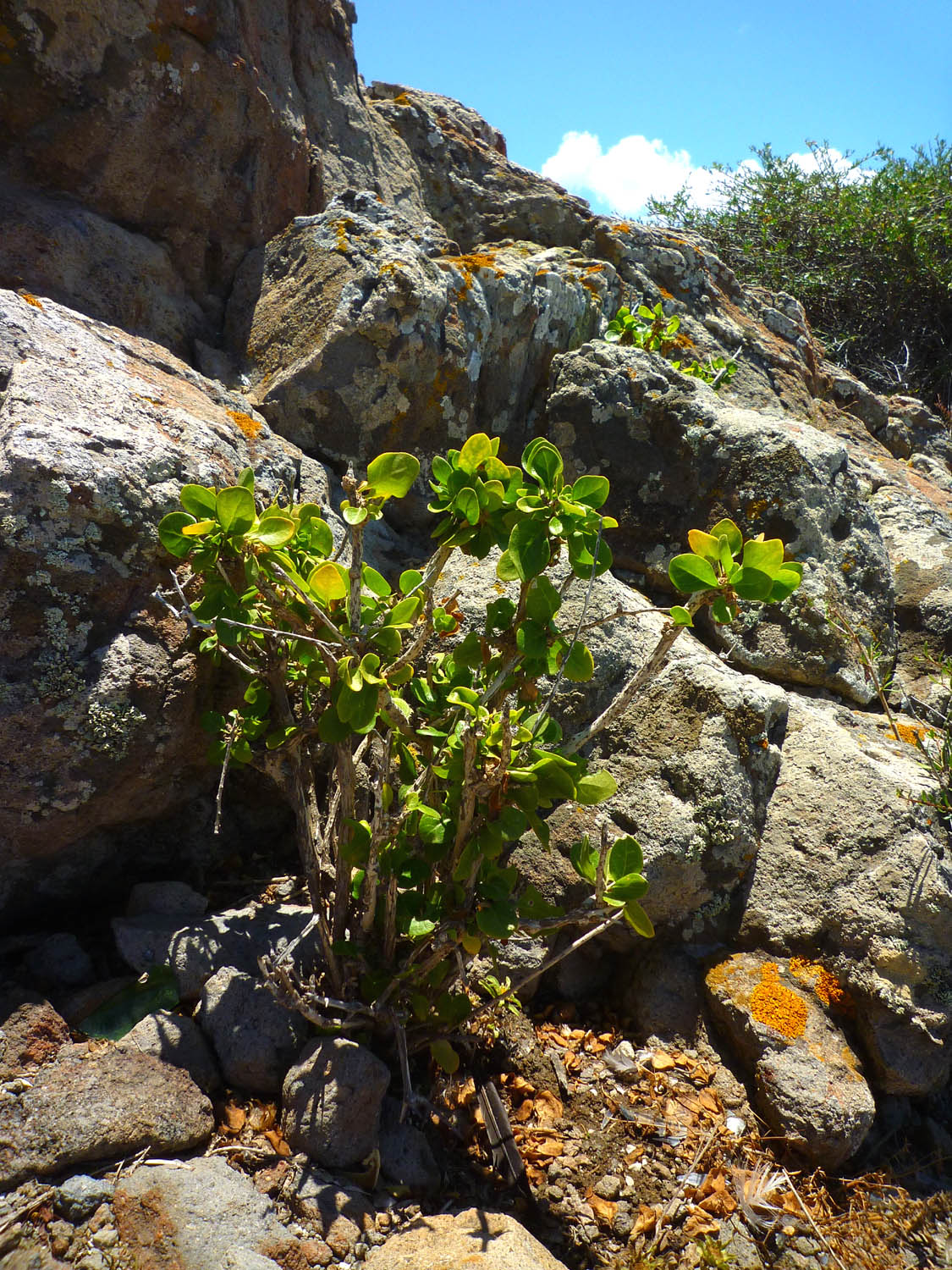
Oroval

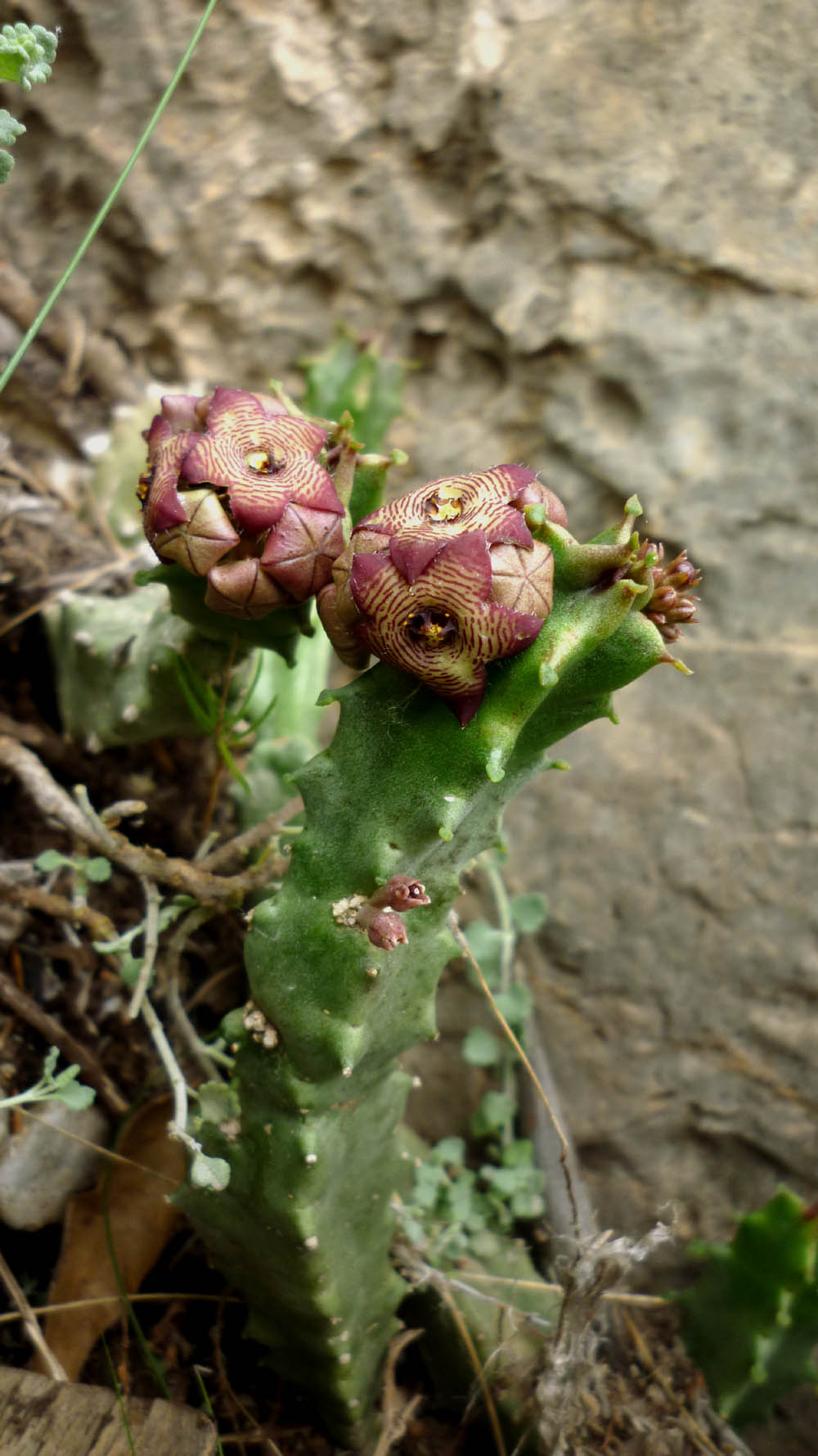
Chumberillo de lobo (Caralluma europaea)

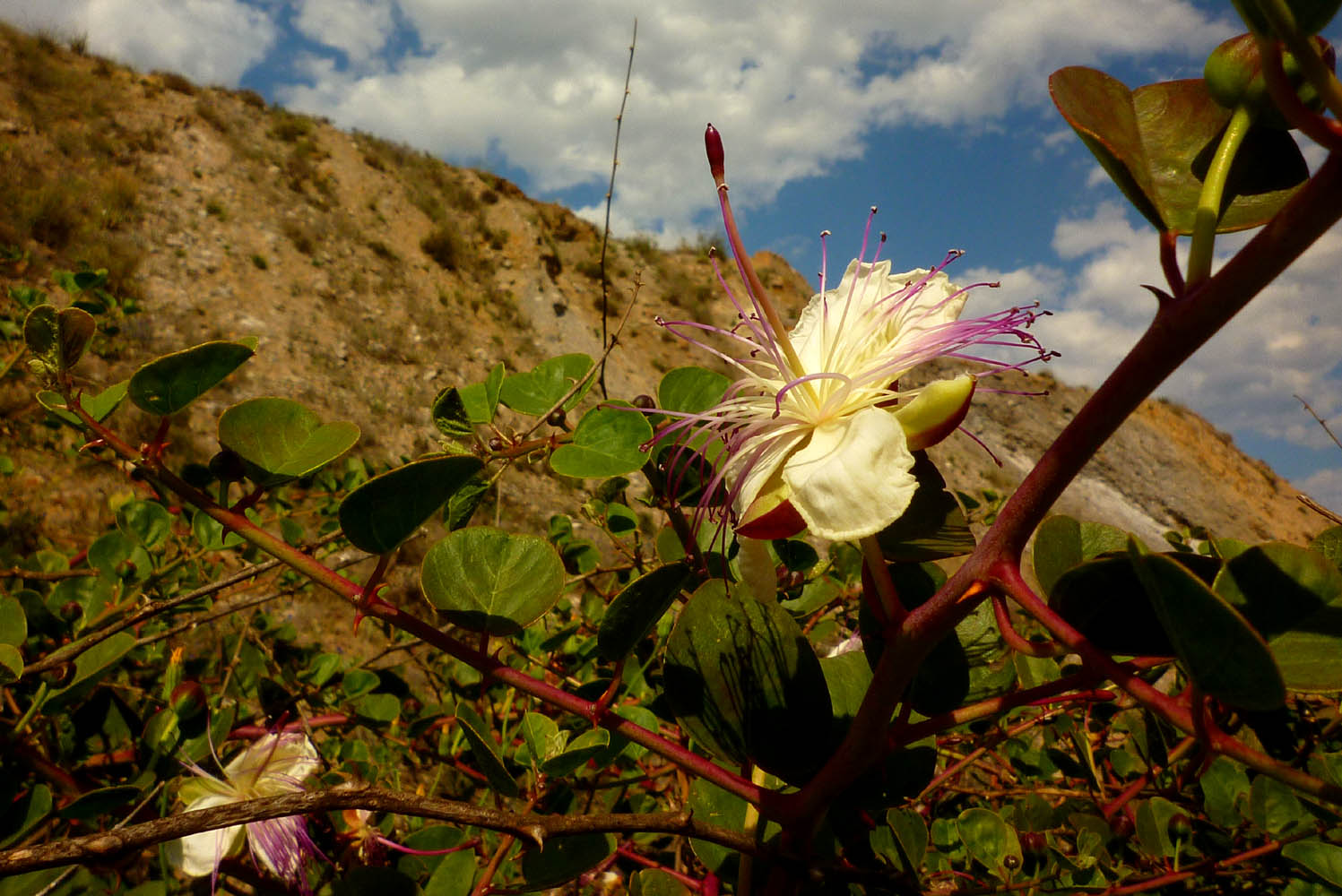
Tapenera de la Sierra Minera

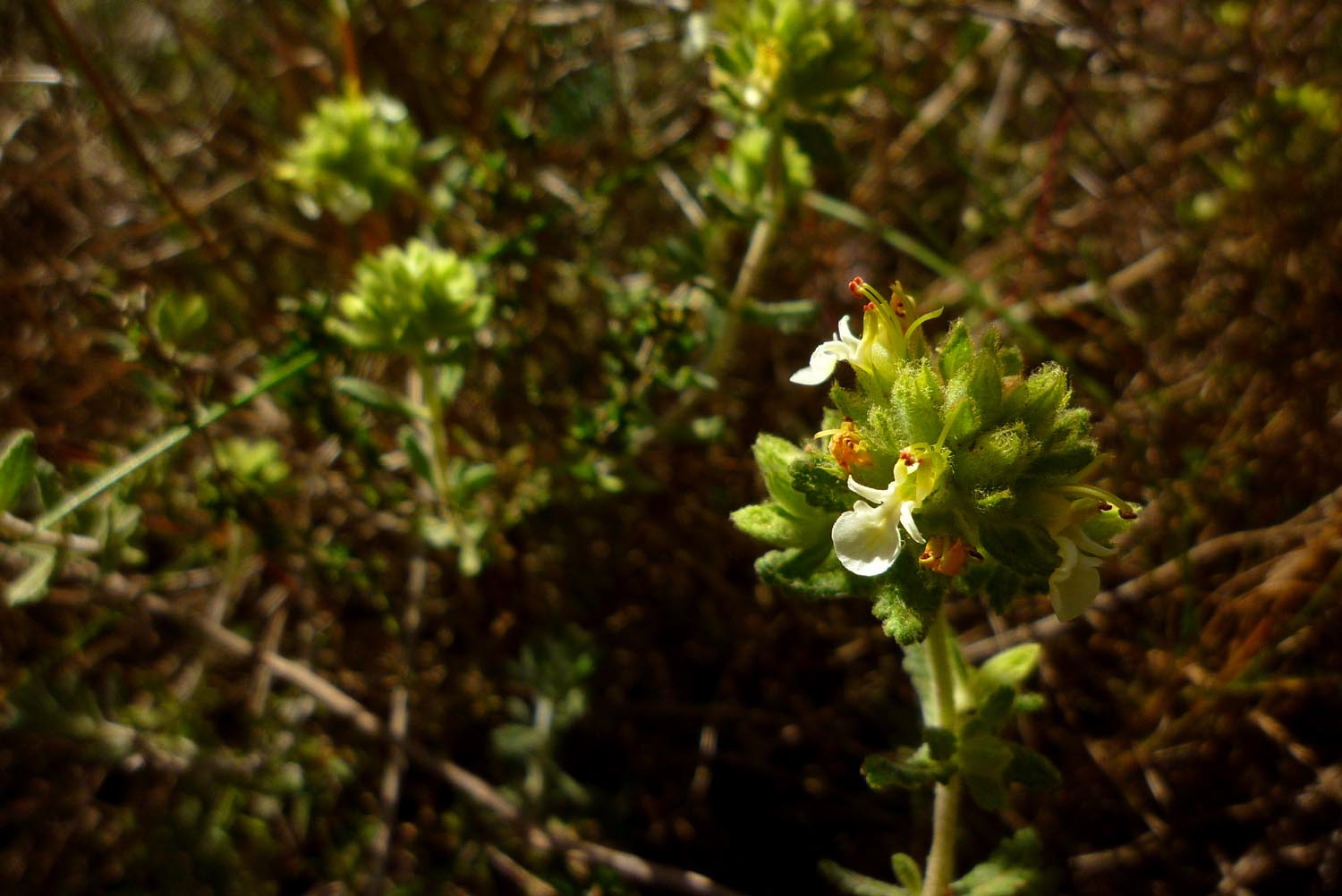
Zamarrilla de Cartagena (Teucrium carthaginense)

All these species are organized in different ecosystems and habitats, many of them of great ecological value and extremely rare in Europe, which has led to the declaration of seven botanical micro-reserves in the mountains. The Cartagena cypress forests or Tetraclinis articulata, present in the Peña del Águila and Monte de las Cenizas, are particularly noteworthy in this aspect.

=== Evolution of the vegetation landscape through history ===
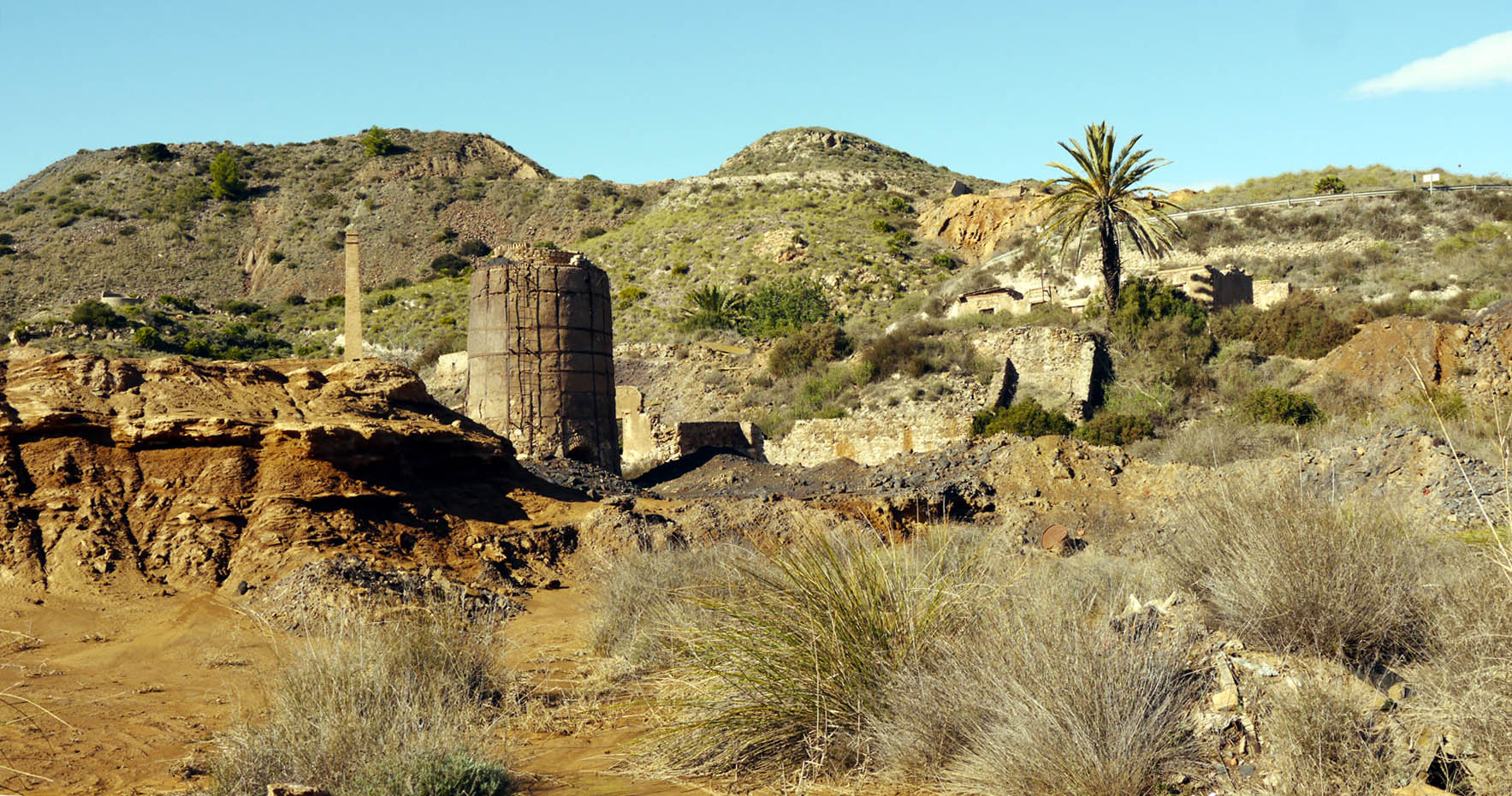
Innocente mine in El Gorguel.

For many centuries, the original ecosystems of the Sierra de Cartagena remained more or less unchanged:

With the demographic increase in the area during the 16th and 17th centuries, and especially from the 18th century onwards, anthropic pressure on the forest increased in the form of clearing, woodcutting and grazing, and the old vegetation cover began to disappear. At the beginning of the 19th century, a large part of the original maquis of the sierra had almost completely disappeared, being replaced by a much poorer ecological forest.

The impact of the first mining works in the 19th century on the mountain was relatively limited, since, at this time, mining was carried out by means of subway galleries, and, on the other hand, the calcination furnaces and foundries were fed with coal imported from England.

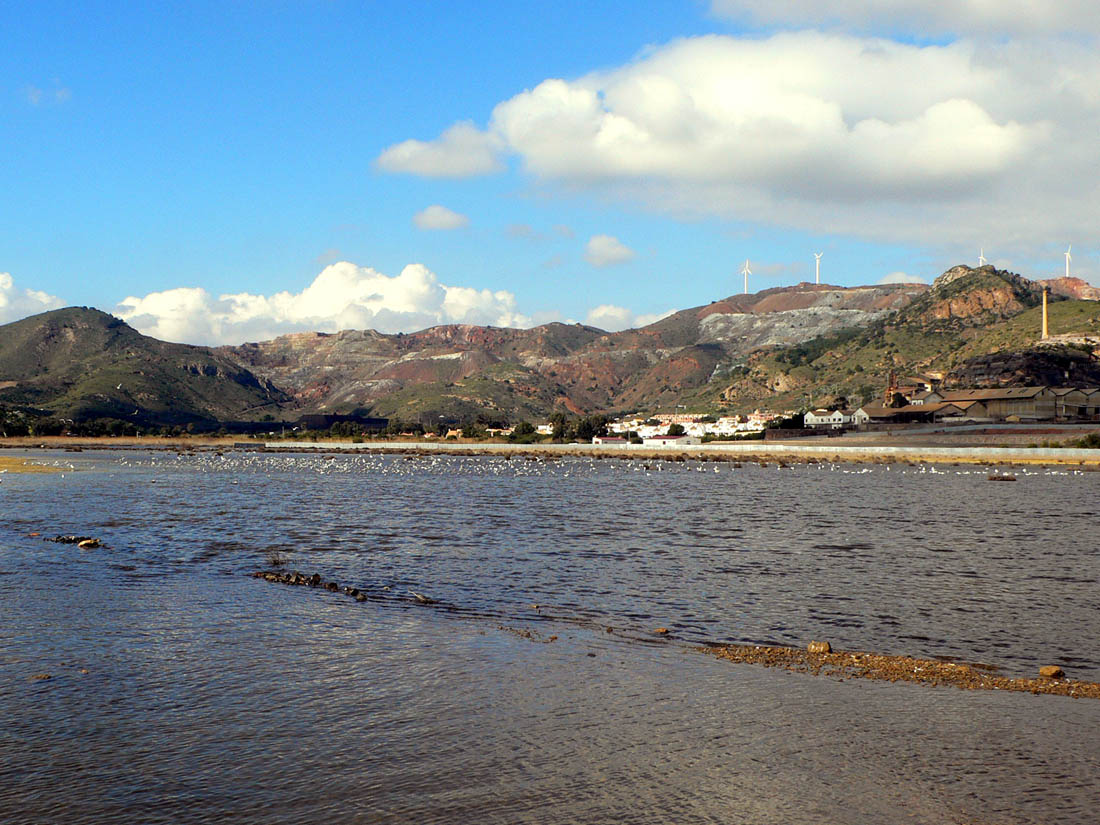
View of the Sancti Spíritus hill with the mining tailings pits from the bay of Portmán.

The environmental problems of the mining sierra were especially aggravated when, from 1952 onwards, the Peñarroya company extended the opening of open-pit mines, such as the Mina Descubierta Emilia, a type of mining work much cheaper than the subway mine, but which causes serious environmental problems due to the loss of soil and the generation of immense earth movements. These practices caused the disappearance of a very important extension of land that has now become a barren area and the loss of numerous habitats and species, such as the jara de Cartagena, a plant formerly described as abundant in the mining sierra, which was considered extinct until its rediscovery in 1983.

However, the biggest problem came from the disposal of the enormous quantities of tailings or mining waste, which in the form of sludge were dumped by the Peñarroya company directly into the sea in the bay of Portmán. The dumping, of up to 7000 tons of mining waste per day began in 1958, authorized by the Franco authorities and contained a high concentration of heavy metals, such as cadmium or lead, as well as very toxic products used in ore washing such as copper sulfate, sodium cyanide, zinc sulfate or sulfuric acid.

The spills began to clog the bay, and to generate a serious landscape and environmental problem.

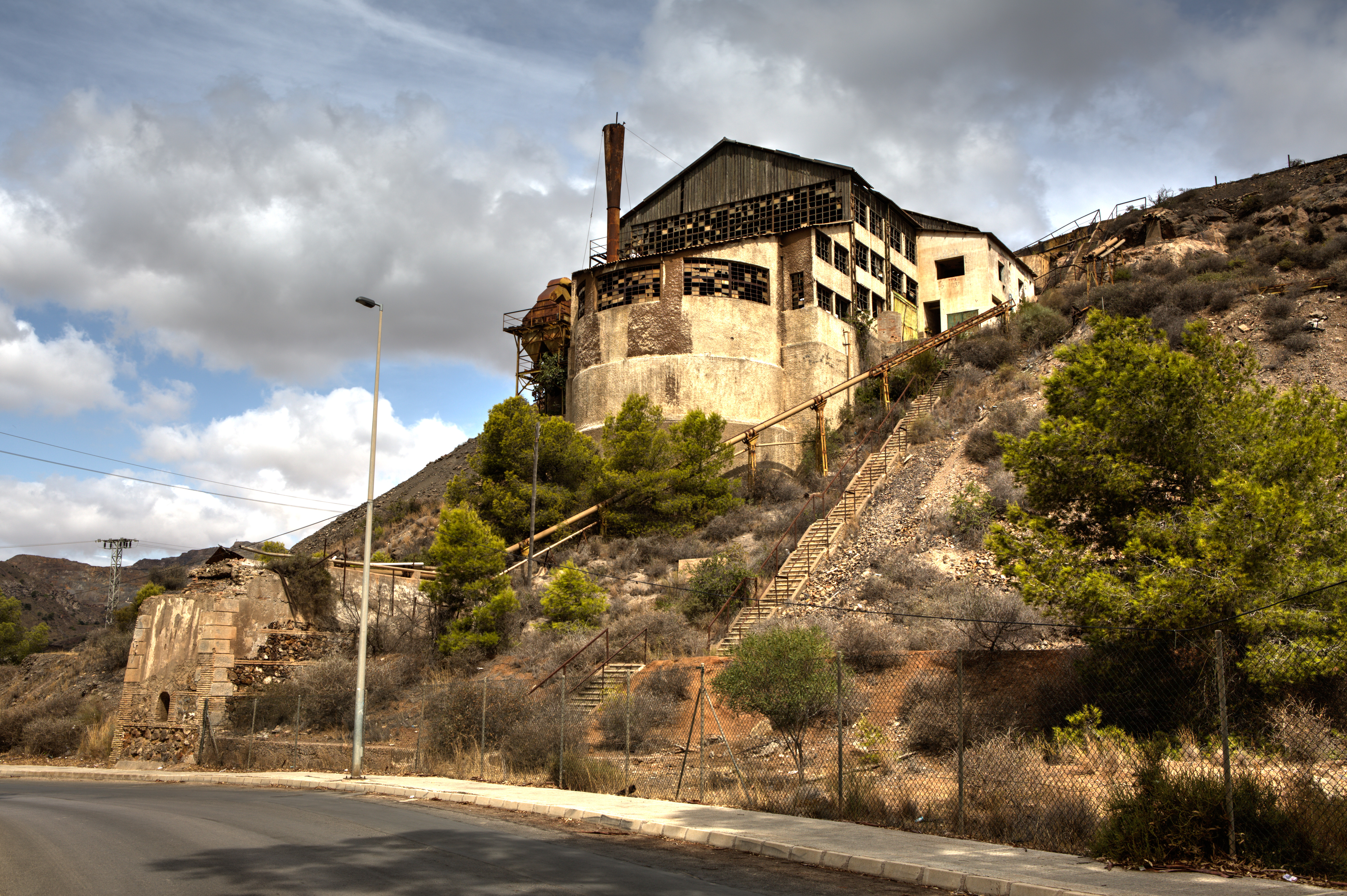
Roberto's washhouse in Portmán

The protests from neighbors and environmental groups increased until 1986, when an intervention by the environmental group Greenpeace managed to place the news of the contamination of the Bay of Portmán in the national newspapers.

In 1990, due in part to pressure from the neighbors and also to the low profitability of mining production, the mines were definitively closed down. When it closed, the Peñarroya company left behind the disappearance of 50 km^{2} of a mountain range, converted into a barren lunar landscape, a bay completely clogged by 33 million cubic meters of toxic waste, a coastline that had advanced 700 m above the sea, and a seabed in which sediments loaded with heavy metals reached up to 12 km out to sea.

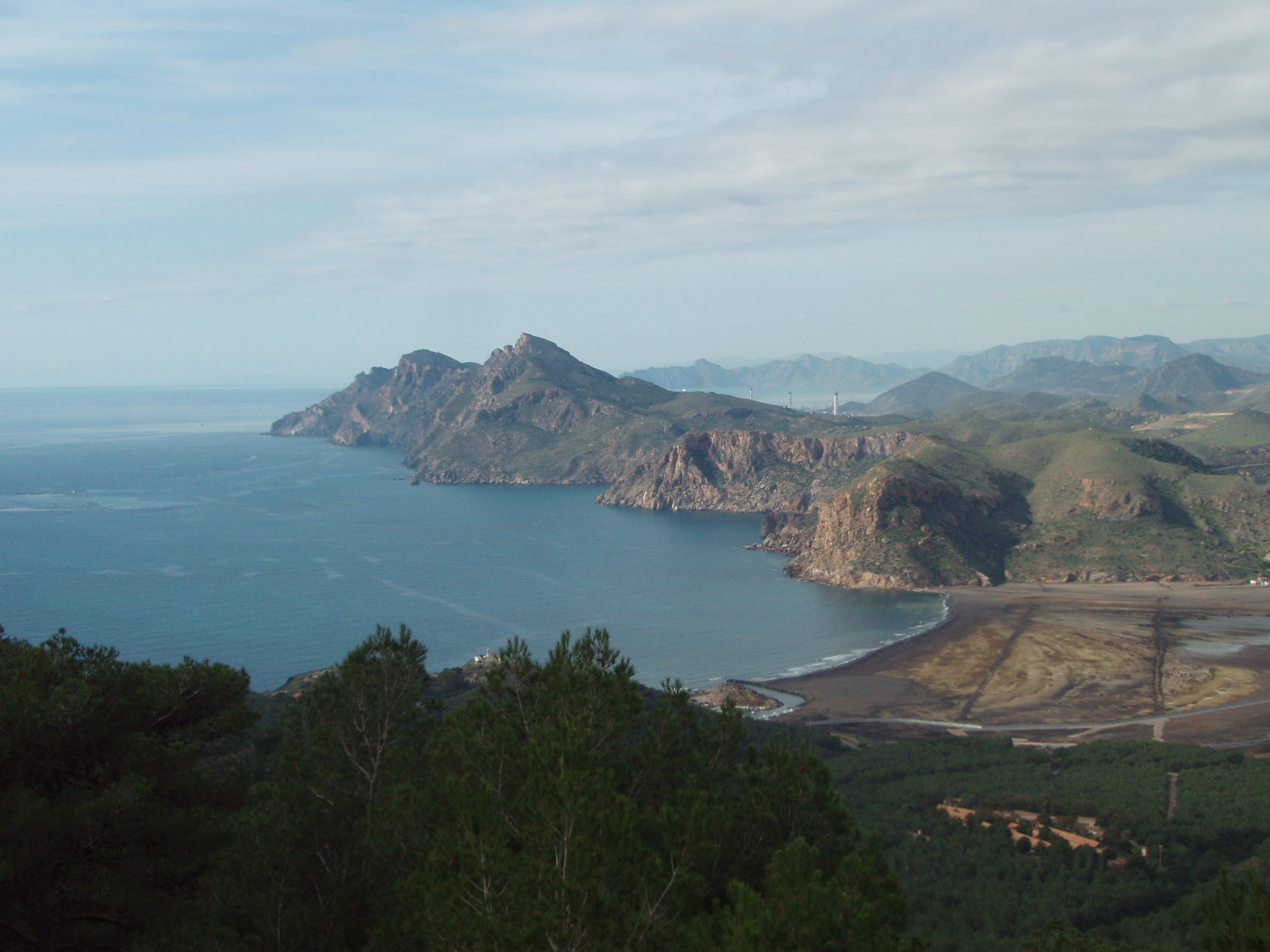
View of Portmán Bay, clogged by mining waste.

In mid-2011, after many unfulfilled promises to regenerate Portmán Bay, a major project was presented to convert the bay environment into a luxury tourist resort with golf courses, marinas and hotels.

In October 2012, the regeneration project is pending award and has a budget appropriation for implementation in 2013.

After the end of mining, and with the real estate boom in Spain (1997–2008), a new threat to the mining mountain range arose in the form of urban pressure, infrastructure construction and arson. Since the declaration of the natural park of Calblanque, Monte de las Cenizas and Peña del Águila in 1992, the number of wildfires in the area has increased very seriously, the last of which, in August 2011 affected 34% of the total number of Cartagena cypress specimens in the area. On the other hand, the construction of a super-port of goods in El Gorguel threatens to seriously degrade a hundred hectares of the Sierra de la Fausilla, protected as a Special Protection Area for Birds (SPA) and Site of Community Importance (SCI).

== Cultural and industrial heritage ==
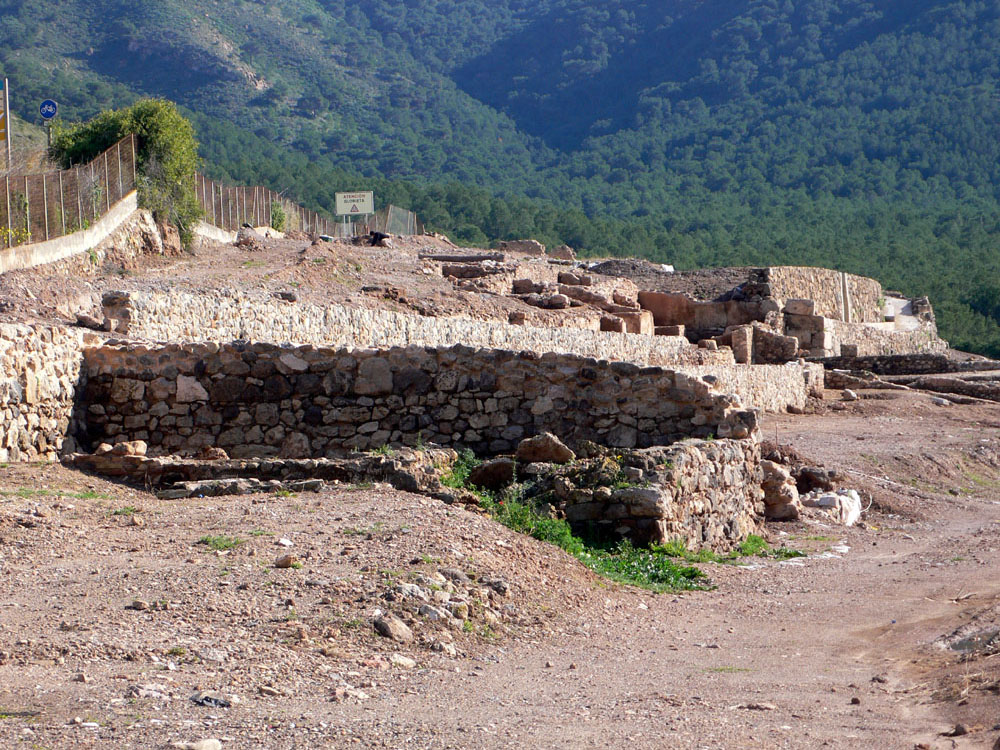
General view of the site of the Roman villa of Paturro.

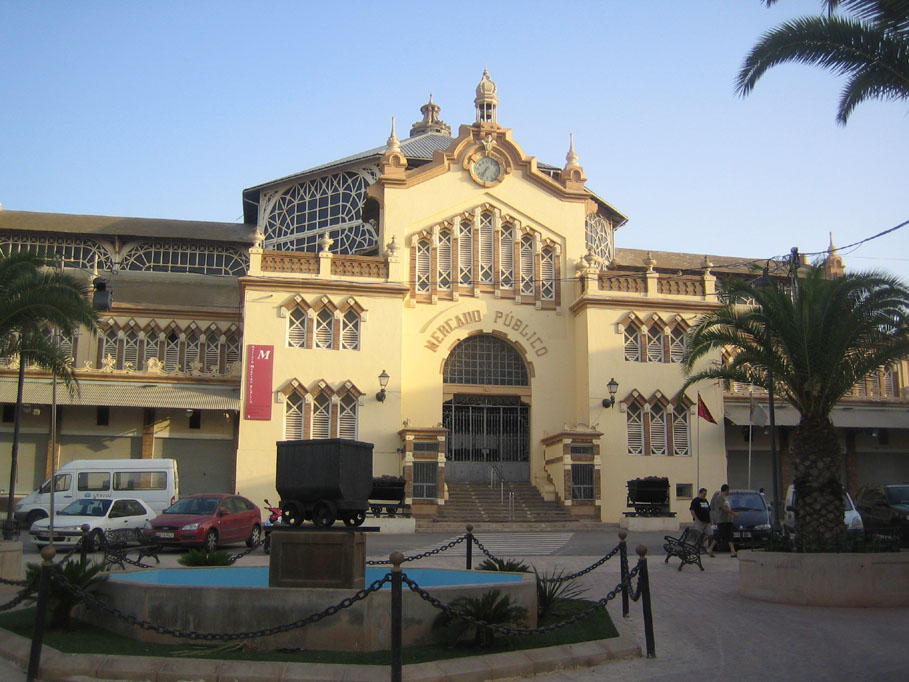
Public market of La Unión, work of Víctor Beltrí of 1901.

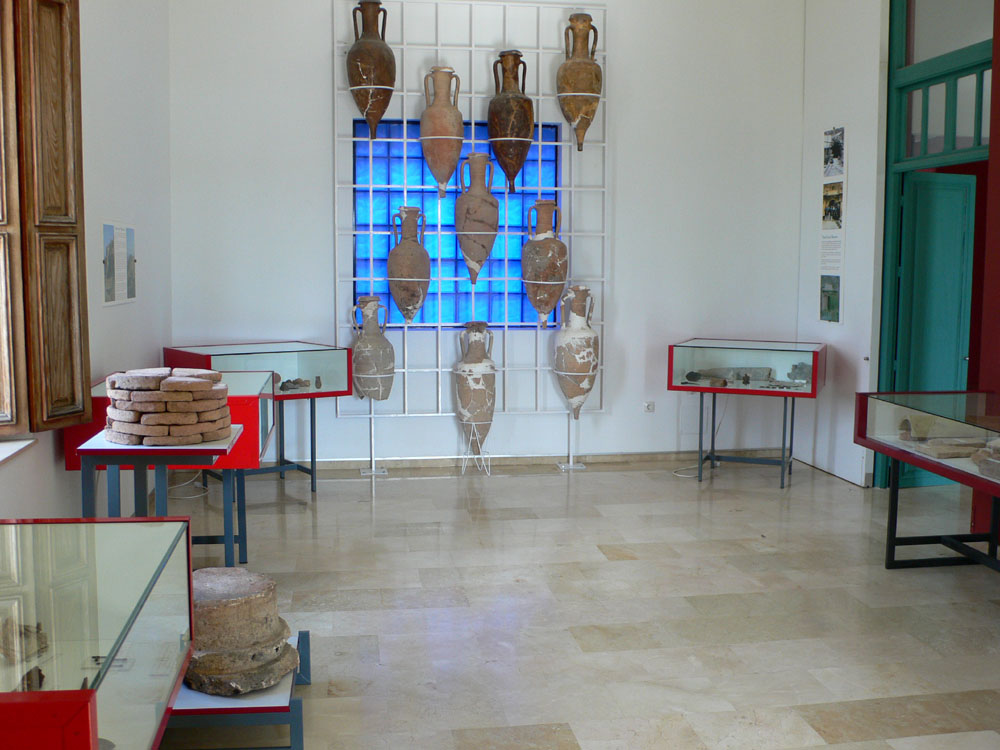
Archaeological museum in Portmán.

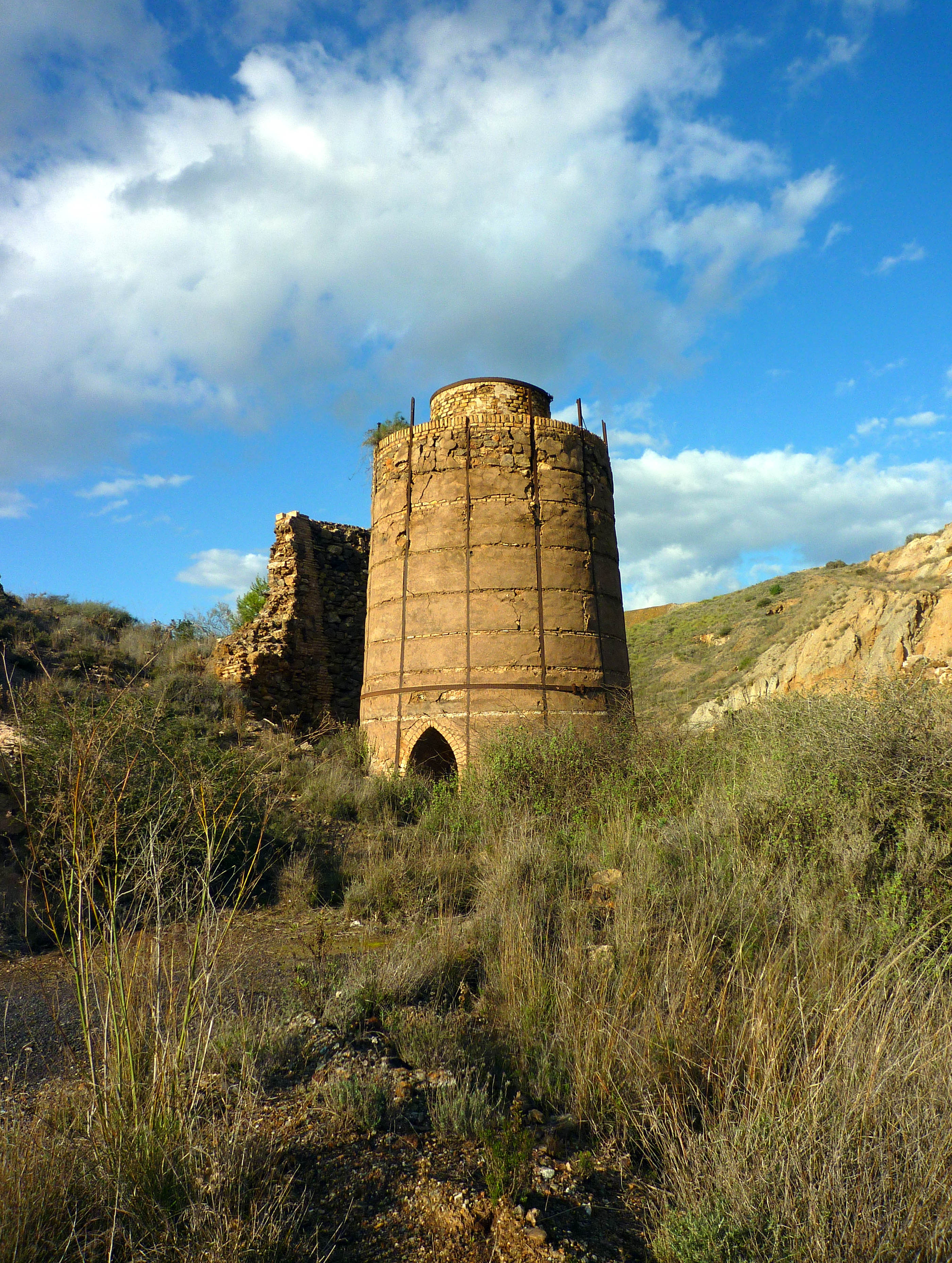
Calcination furnace of the Innocente Mine.

Product of the intense human activity through the centuries, the mining mountain range of Cartagena-La Unión treasures a valuable historical, archaeological and cultural legacy related to mining. The following can be highlighted:

=== Archaeological sites ===
- Roman Villa of Paturro in Portmán. Roman Villa that in the time of the Roman Republic was related to the mining activity in the area. Currently, in 2009, it is in the process of restoration and museumization.

=== Architecture ===
- The old public market of La Unión. Fundamental work of modernism in the Region of Murcia by the architect Víctor Beltrí in 1907.
- Casa del Piñón of La Unión. Work of Pedro Cerdán of 1899. According to the legend, in the interior a metallic dome designed by the French engineer Gustave Eiffel is conserved, although this information cannot be confirmed documentarily.
- Casa del Tío Lobo. Modernist work of Víctor Beltrí of 1913 in Portmán.

=== Museums ===
La Unión has three museums related to mining.

- Archaeological Museum of La Unión, located in Portmán. It is a small museum in which some remains of the Roman exploitations of the mines are preserved, as well as the mosaic discovered in 1969 in the Villa del Paturro.
- Mining Museum of La Unión. It has an interesting collection of minerals, mining instruments and scale models of the processes of extraction and washing of mineral.
- Ethnological Museum of La Unión located in Roche.

=== Industrial mining heritage ===
Scattered throughout the mountains are many remains of the recent industrial past of mining in the area: facilities, made of brick and iron, among which are:

- Headframes (in Spanish: castilletes): Vertical structures that are placed over a shaft to allow the maneuvers of mineral extraction.
- Mining shafts for access to the mines.
- Chimneys for the evacuation of gases produced during ore smelting.
- Ore washes. Places where the ore was separated from the gangue.
- Calcination furnaces and smelters.
- Supply depots (in Spanish: polvorines) where explosive substances were kept.

Almost all of these elements are in a very dilapidated state due to the abandonment of mining activity, although some have recently been restored and can be visited.

=== Mining interpretation centers ===
Some industrial facilities have been recovered or are in the process of being recovered:

- Agrupa Vicenta Mine. Pyrite mine in gallery in the municipality of La Unión. Inaugurated in summer 2010.
- Las Matildes Mine Interpretation Center. Located in Llano del Beal.
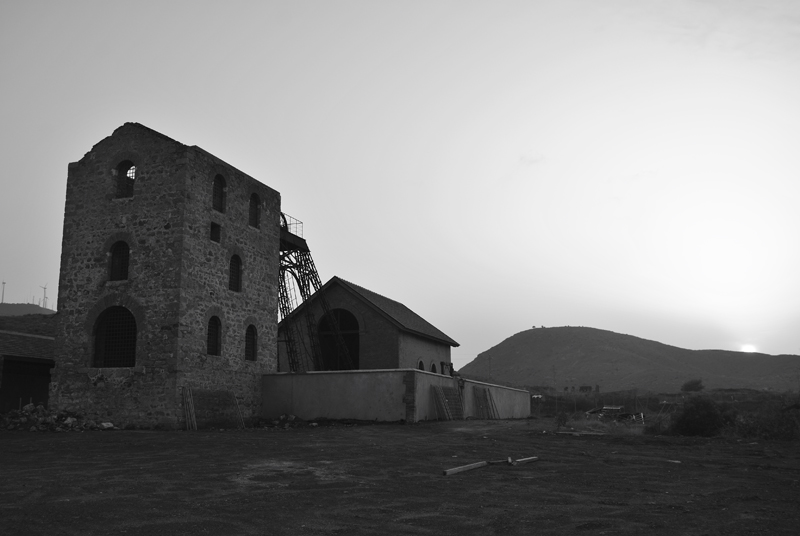
Las Matildes Mine Interpretation Center.

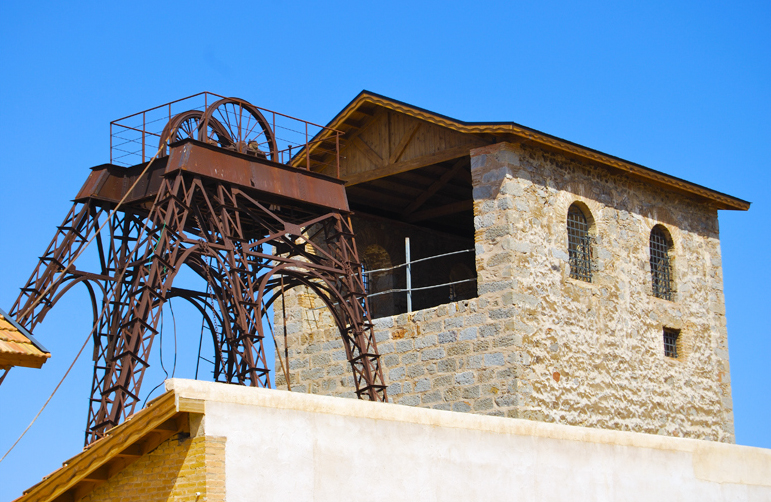
Las Matildes Mine Interpretation Center.

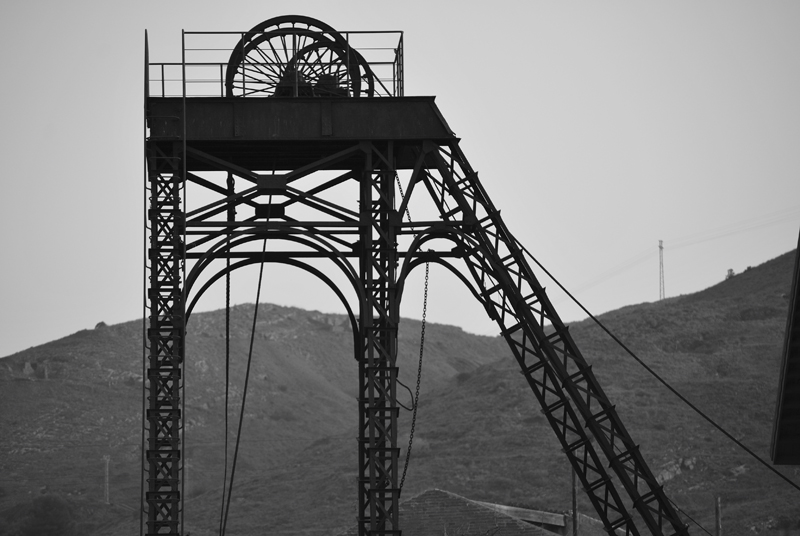
Detail of a castillete. Las Matildes Mine Interpretation Center.

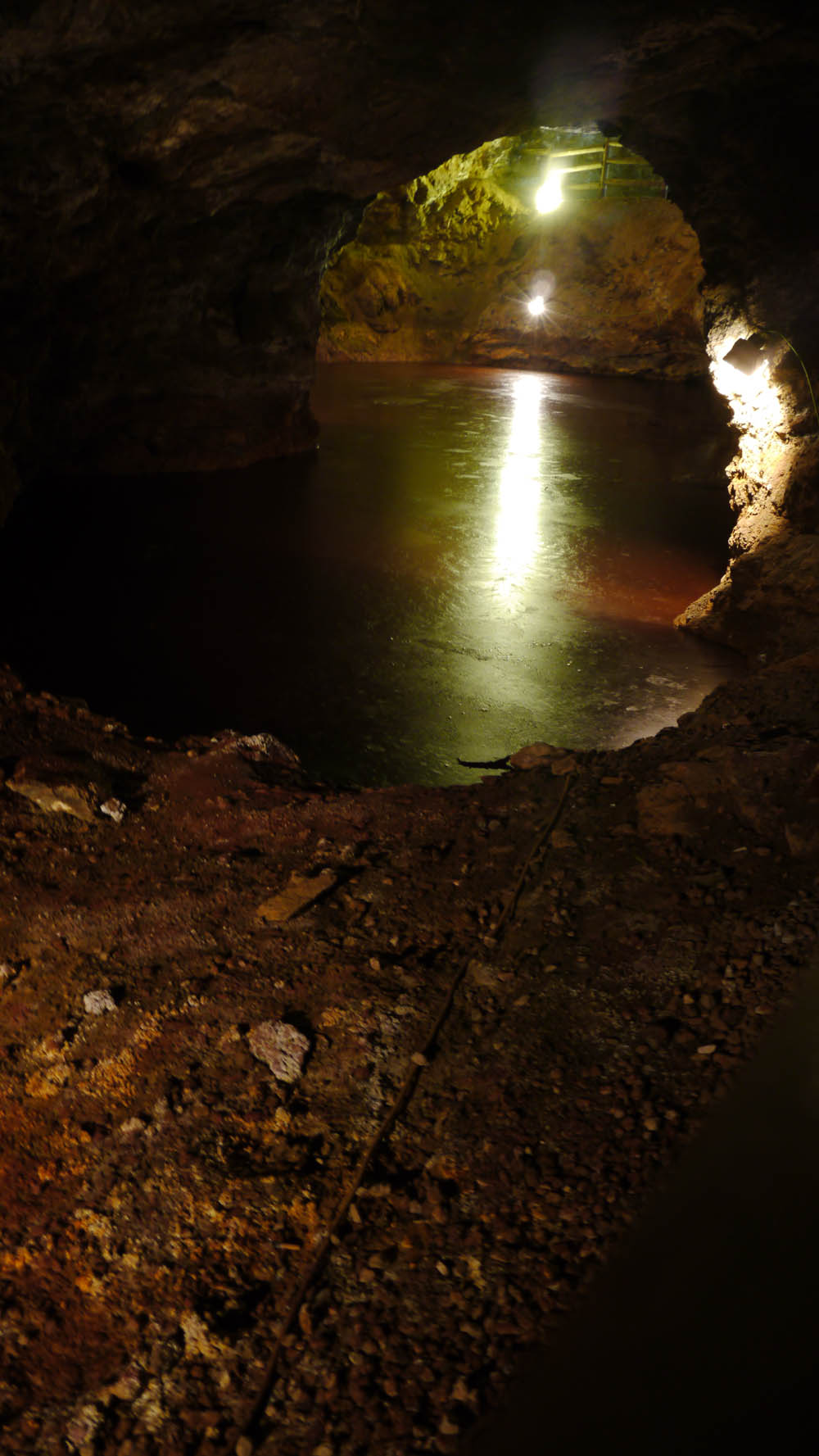
Acid lake inside the Agrupa Vicenta mine.

=== Singing of the mines ===
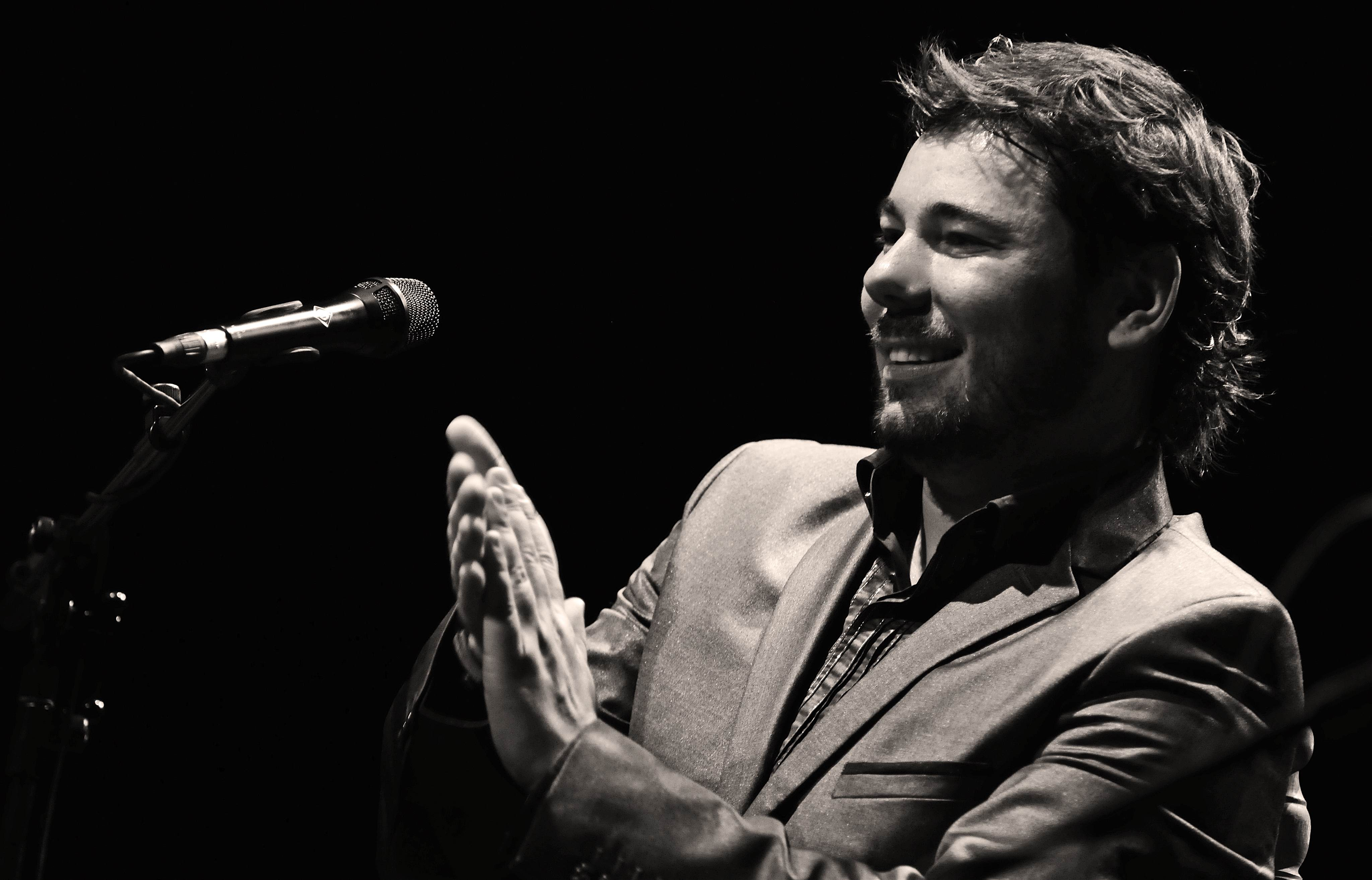
Miguel Poveda, winner of the Festival del cante de las minas in 1993.

With the opening of mining deposits in the 19th century, thousands of Andalusian workers, especially from the provinces of Granada and Almería, migrated to Cartagena and La Unión to work in the mines. With them, flamenco singing also arrived in the area. From the malagueña, the granaína and the taranto de Almería, heirs of the fandango, brought by the Andalusian workers and their contact with the local fandangos, the so-called cantes minero-levantinos were born. The most outstanding are:

- La taranta: Difficult song, long and of deep depth coming from the fandango from Almeria.
- La minera: Also difficult and deep song based on the hardships of working in the mine.
- La cartagenera: It comes from the "aflamencamiento" of the local fandangos of the 18th century. It does not deal with mining themes.
- The mining fandango.
- The levantica.
- The murciana.

Since 1961 the Festival Internacional del Cante de las Minas has been held in La Unión every August. This festival commemorates the songs that the miners' ancestors used to sing during their long day of work in the mines and has become one of the most important festivals in the world of flamenco singing.

In November 2010, flamenco was declared Intangible Cultural Heritage of Humanity by UNESCO.

== Legal protection ==
=== Protection as a historical site ===
Due to its geological and historical-industrial values, as well as the intense transformation of the landscape generated by the mining activity, the Sierra Minera has been declared a Good of Cultural Interest (BIC) by Decree of April 30, 2009 of the Governing Council of the Autonomous Community of the Region of Murcia, with the category of historical site.

=== Environmental protection ===
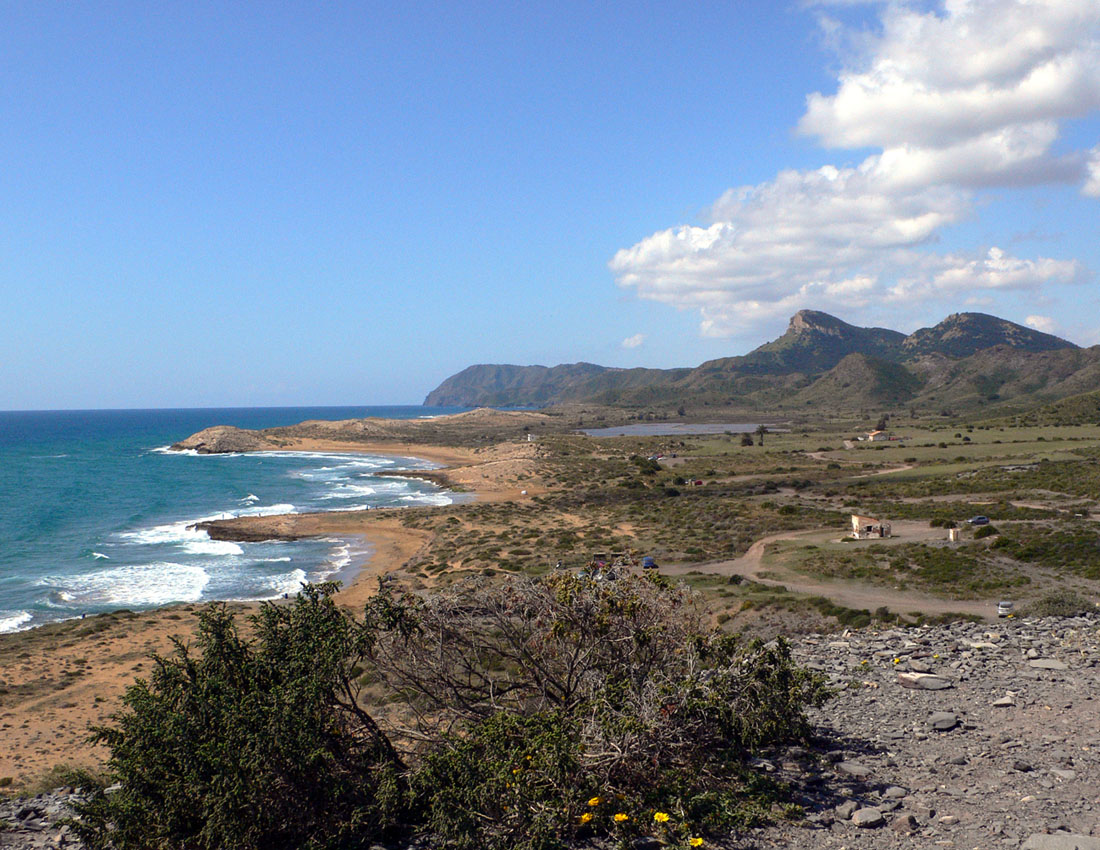
View of the natural park of Calblanque.

As far as environmental protection is concerned, in spite of the tremendous ecological impact generated by the mining works, the Cartagena-La Unión mountain range still conserves important natural values. In addition, it has the protection of the legal personality of the Mar Menor ecosystem, on the side of the basin that will lead to the sea and which has been requested to be extended to the Mediterranean side of the Santo Espiritu massif, that is, to Portmán.

- Regional Park of Calblanque, Monte de las Cenizas and Peña del Águila. In the eastern area of the Sierra Minera, from Portmán to Cala Reona, the area of Calblanque, Monte de las Cenizas and Peña del Águila has been delimited, protected with the categories of natural park and SCI (Site of Community Importance).

In addition, recently, it has been proposed its declaration as a biosphere reserve by UNESCO.

- Sierra de la Fausilla. On the other hand, to the west of Portmán, is the Sierra de La Fausilla, protected as a Special Protection Area for Birds.
- Botanical micro-reserves. To protect the exceptional plant diversity of the sierra, the declaration of seven botanical micro-reserves has been proposed, five in the municipality of Cartagena and two in the municipality of La Unión:
  - Dunes of Rasall (Cartagena).
  - Roquedos and fruticedas of La Porpuz (Cartagena).
  - Sabinar of the cypress of Cartagena (Cartagena).
  - Grassland of Llano del Beal (Cartagena).
  - Tomillar and fruticeda of Atamaría and Monte de las Cenizas (Cartagena).
  - Fruticedas of Cabezo de la Galera and Cola del Caballo (La Unión).
  - Cuesta de las Lajas (La Unión).
