= Campo de Cartagena =

Coordinates: 37°37′N 00°59′W

- Natural region
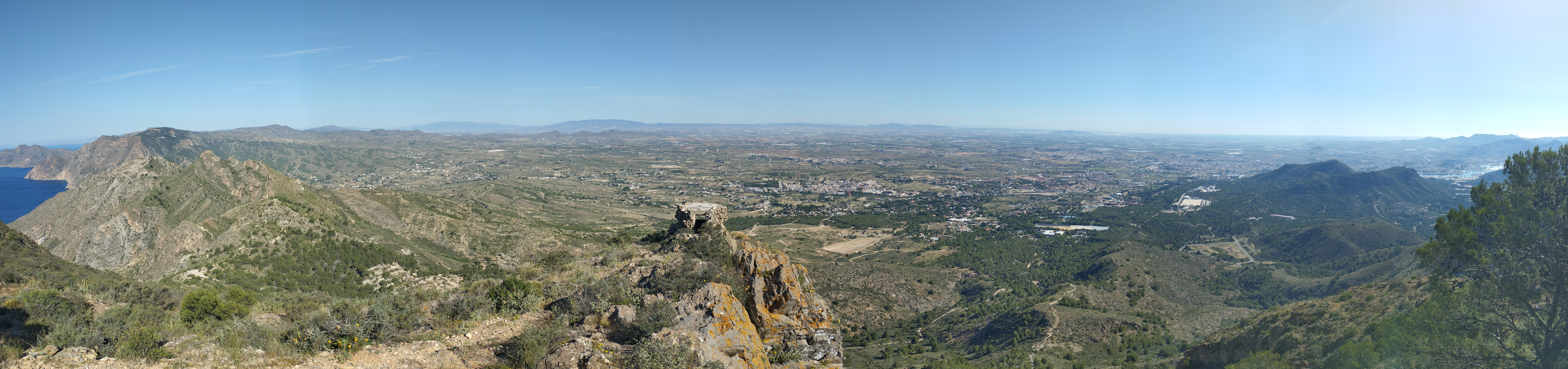
- View of the Campo de Cartagena plain from the Collado Roldán.

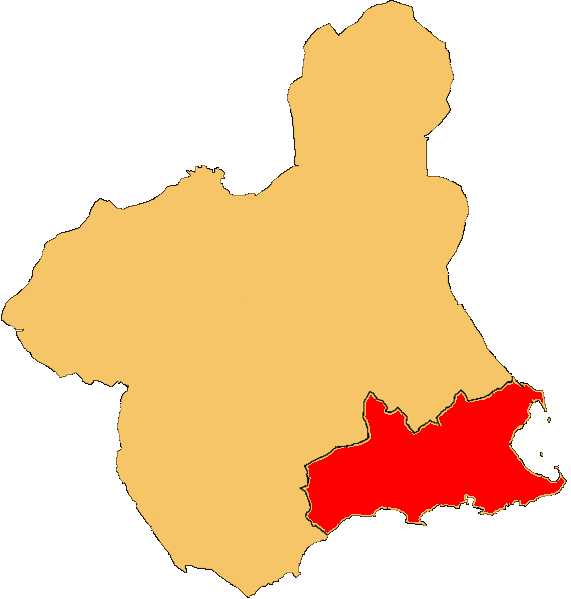
- Location of the Campo de Cartagena in the Region of Murcia
- Country: Spain

Area
  - Total: 1,855 km^{2} (716 sq mi)
- Elevation: 10 m (33 ft)

Population
  - Total: 418,686
  - Density: 225.7/km^{2} (584.6/sq mi)

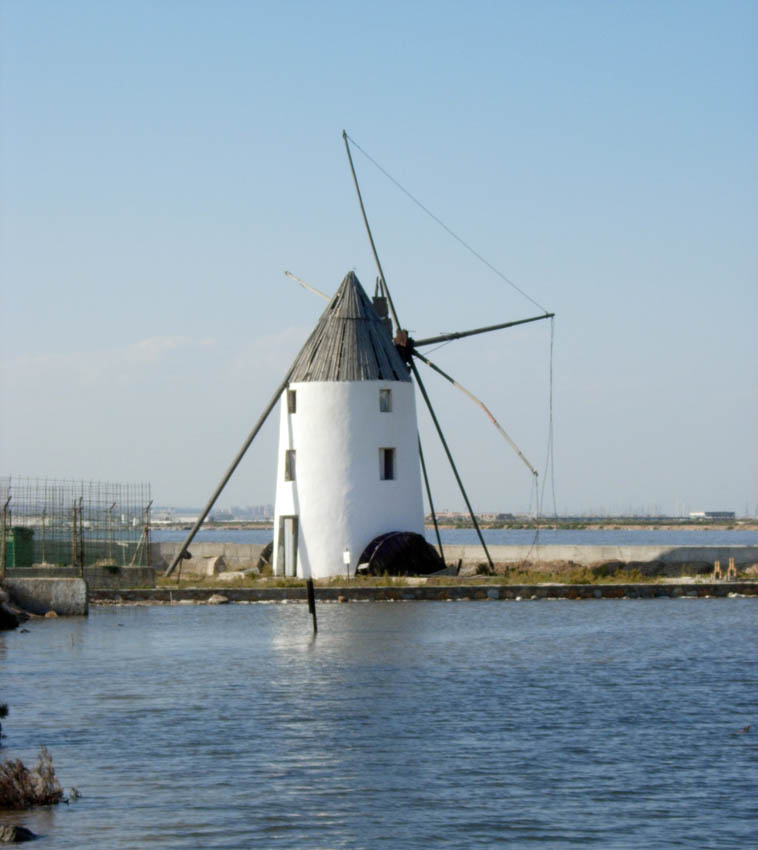
Typical windmill from Campo de Cartagena

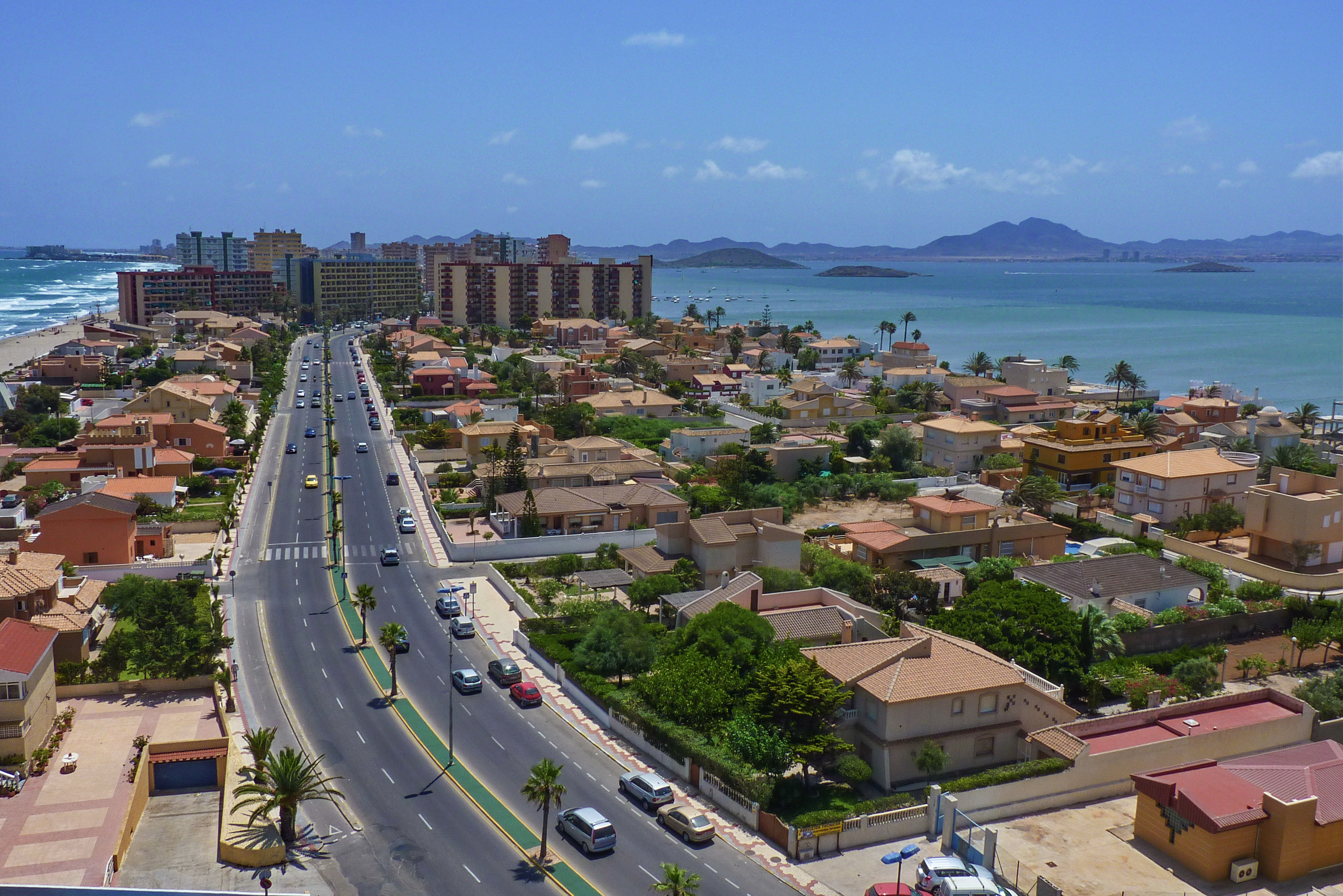
La Manga del Mar Menor is a 21km seaside spit separating the Mar Menor (right) from the Mediterranean (left)

Campo de Cartagena is a natural region (comarca) located in the Region of Murcia, in Spain. For administrative purposes, it is also known as Comarca del Campo de Cartagena or Comarca de Cartagena. It is located in the southeast of the Iberian Peninsula, forming a plain which extends from the Sierra de Carrascoy to the Mediterranean. The capital city is Cartagena, the most important Naval Base of the Spanish Navy in the Mediterranean Sea.

The comarca contains 393,598 inhabitants (2019) in an area of 1,481.8 km^{2}, making up the metropolitan area of Cartagena, a center for tourism, culture, industry and nature, with more than 18,500 protected hectares, among places like the Calblanque, Monte de las Cenizas y Peña del Águila Natural Park; the Sierra de la Muela, Cabo Tiñoso and Roldán Natural Park; Salinas y Arenales de San Pedro del Pinatar or Islas e Islotes del Litoral Mediterráneo (Islands and Islets of the Mediterranean Shore), among others. Beside those places, it must be added much of the marine environment, highlighting the Mar Menor, the Marine Reserve of Cabo de Palos e Islas Hormigas, and the Cape Tiñoso surroundings.

== Municipalities ==
The comarca is composed of eight municipalities, listed below with their areas and populations:

Name	Area (km^{2})	Population (2001)	Population (2011)	Population (2020)
Cartagena	558.0	184,686	215,757	216,108
La Unión	24.8	14,541	18,965	20,538
Torre-Pacheco	189.4	24,332	33,419	36,464
Los Alcázares	19.8	8,470	15,628	16,590
San Javier	75.1	20,125	31,901	33,129
San Pedro del Pinatar	22.3	16,678	23,981	25,932
Fuente Álamo de Murcia	273.5	11,583	16,117	16,787
Mazarrón	318.9	20,841	34,422	32,839
Totals	1,481.80	301,256	390,190	398,387

Natural protected zones in Campo de Cartagena

== History ==
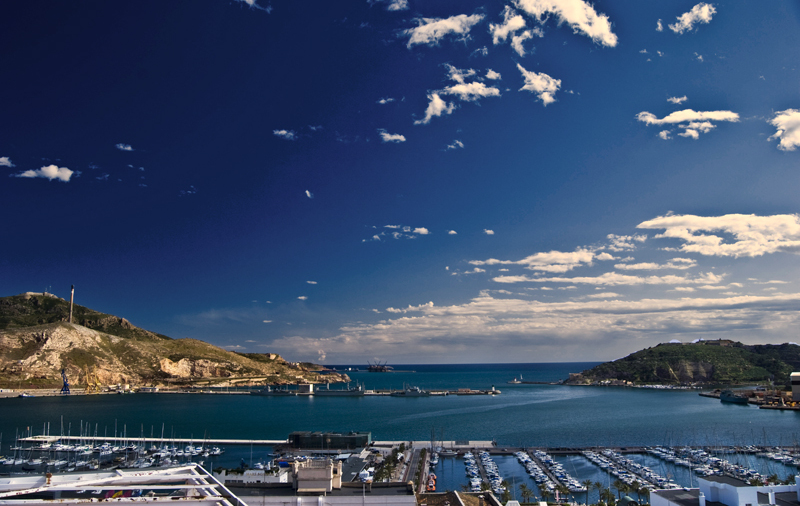
Cartagena's port, a major port in the Iberian Peninsula, for more than 3000 years

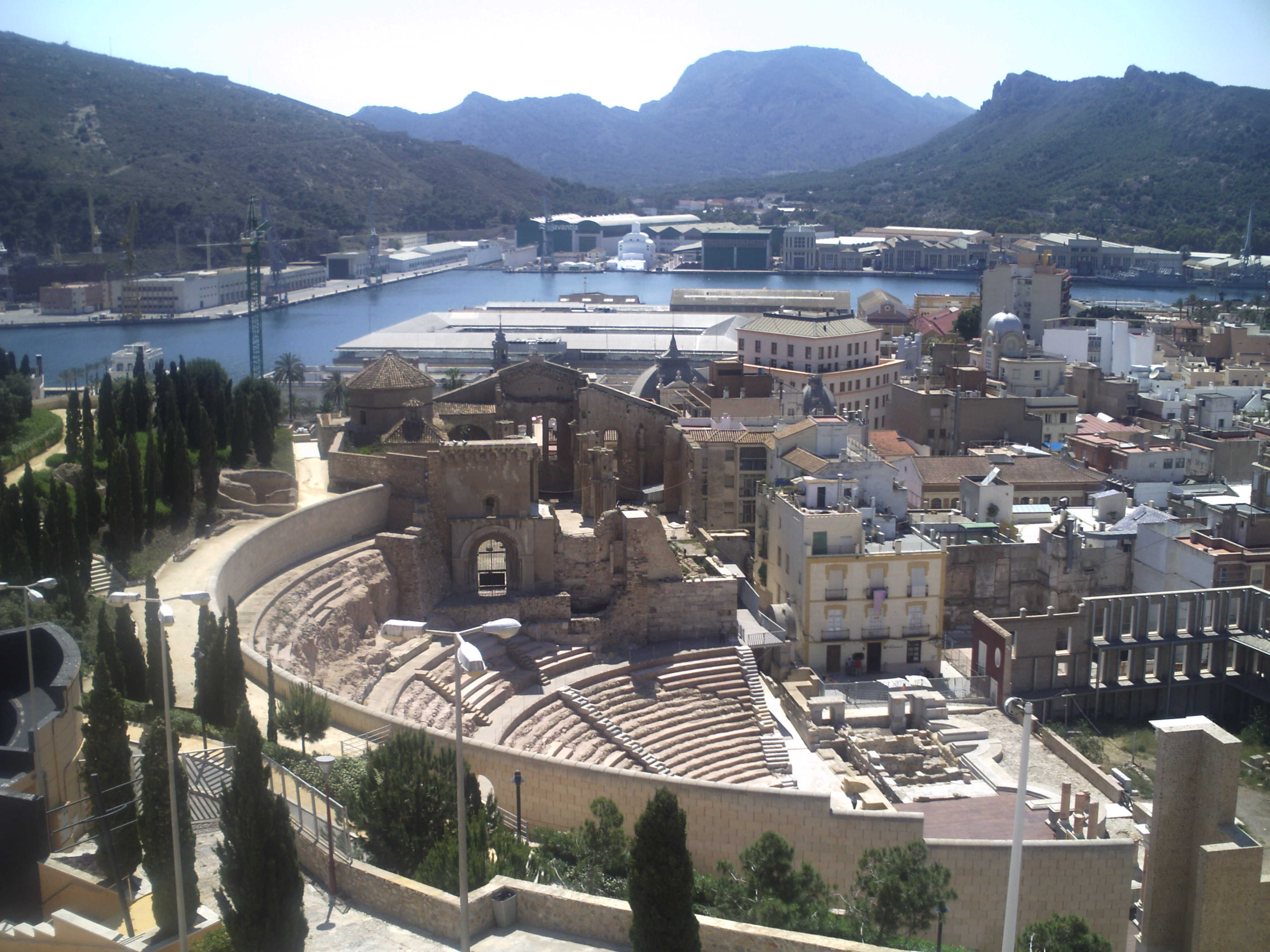
Roman theatre of Cartagena

The Campo de Cartagena has valuable remains of its ancient past. In the city of Cartagena can be seen numerous monuments, museums and archaeological remains.

An attempt was made during the First Spanish Republic, on July 12 of 1873 to establish a canton in the Cartagena area. The insurgency took the name Cantonal Revolution and in the following days it spread through many other regions. Following the revolt the city of Cartagena endured for several months the attack of the troops sent by Nicolás Salmerón to restore order.

== Geography ==
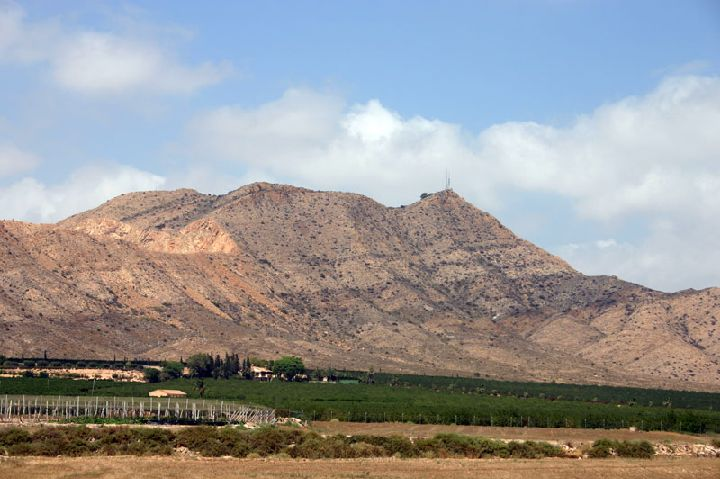
Cabezo Gordo

There are some mountain ranges in this region such as Sierra Minera de Cartagena-La Unión, which is located at the South-East, Sierra de la Muela Cabo Tiñoso y Roldán, that is located at the South-West of Cartagena, Sierra de la Fausilla, that is located in the South of Cartagena, Sierras de las Victorias and Cabezo del Pericón, that are located on the North-West of the municipality, and part of the south of Sierra de Carrascoy, in the North of Fuente Álamo de Murcia. No rivers or water beds with permanent course can be found in this region, but there are several water beds with occasional water courses (specially after rains) named creeks or arroyos. The main ones are Rambla del Albujón and Rambla de Benipila. Some noteworhty mountains are Cabezo Gordo, in Torre-Pacheco, Morra del Pino in the north of Fuente Álamo, that is 830 metres above the sea, Peñas Blancas in Cartagena, that is 625 metres high, La Muela in Cartagena, that is 546 metres and Pico Roldán also in Cartagena, which height is 489.

== See also ==
- Comarcas of Spain
- Sierra minera de Cartagena-La Unión
- Mar Menor
- El Carmolí
- Capparis zoharyi
- Narcissus tortifolius, varica de San José.
