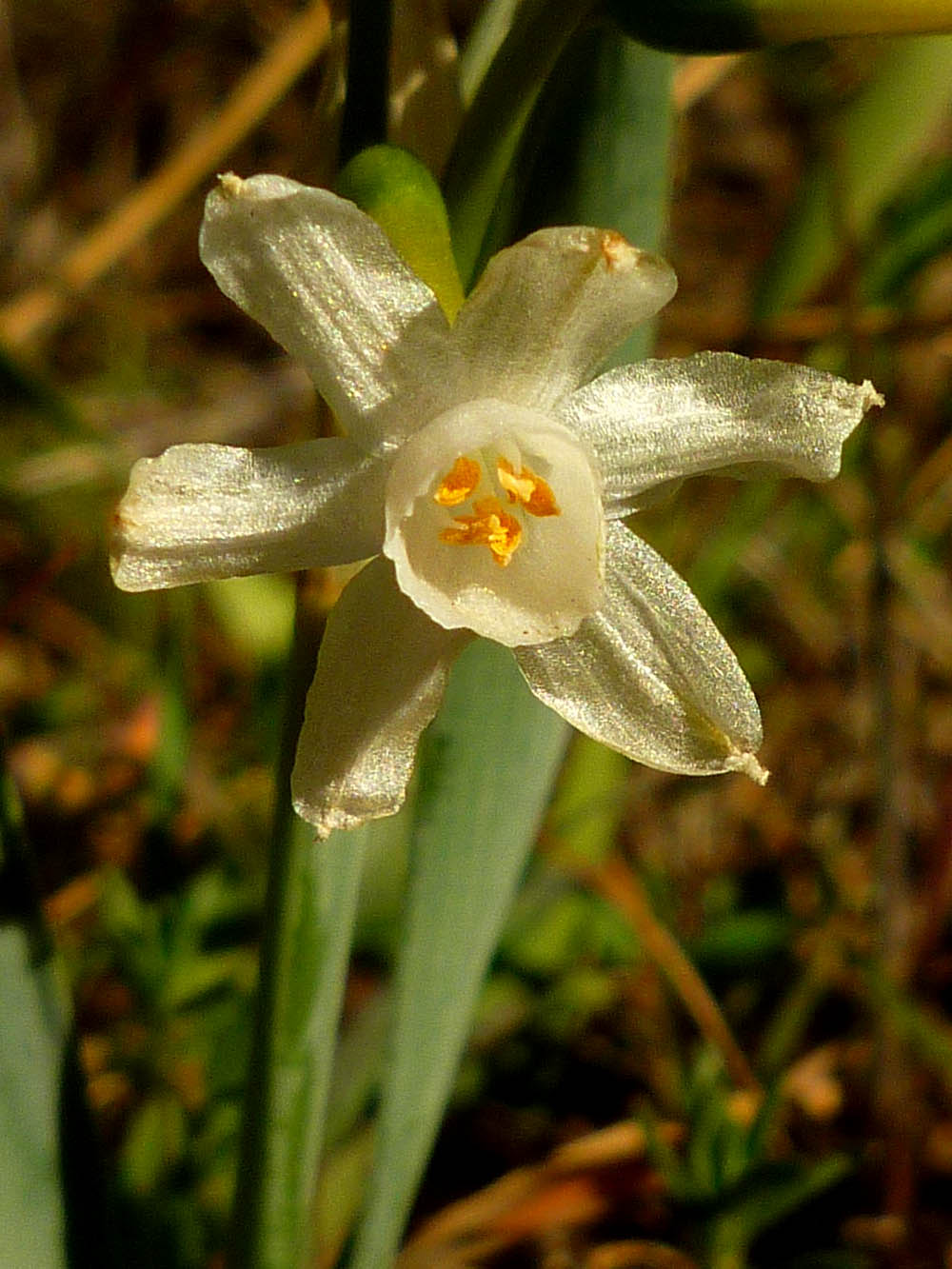

Scientific classification
- Kingdom: Plantae
- Clade: Tracheophytes
- Clade: Angiosperms
- Clade: Monocots
- Order: Asparagales
- Family: Amaryllidaceae
- Subfamily: Amaryllidoideae
- Genus: Narcissus
- Species: N. tortifolius

Binomial name
- Narcissus tortifolius Fern.Casas
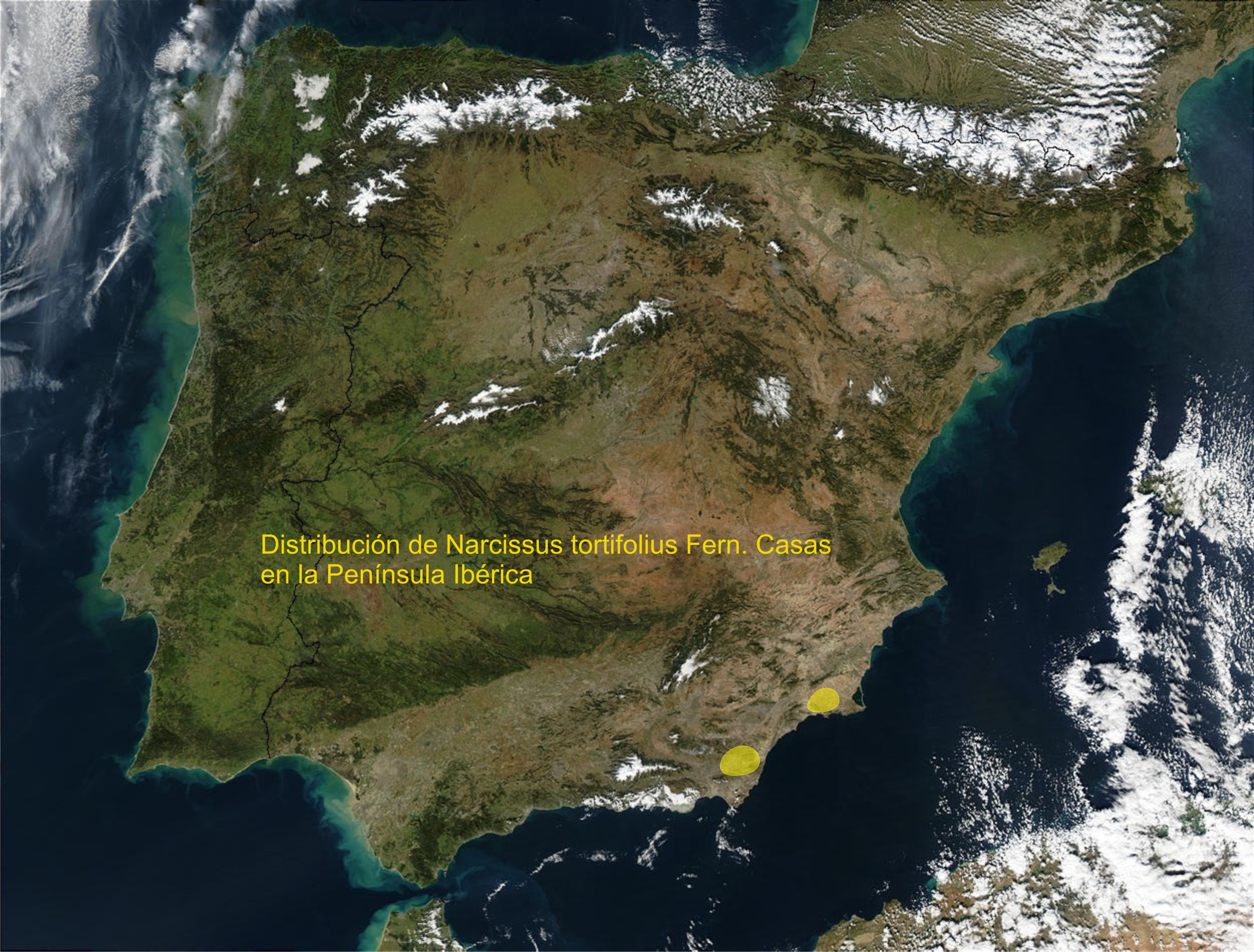
- Natural distribution.

= Narcissus tortifolius =

Species of flowering plant

Narcissus tortifolius (in Spanish: varica de San José) is a type of Narcissus endemic to the Province of Almeria and the Campo de Cartagena in the Region of Murcia.

== Description ==
It is a plant very well adapted to the arid conditions of southeastern Spain. It inhabits in esparto grasslands and thyme fields.

It sprouts from the bulb in December and flowers between February and March.

In Cartagena it can be found in the towns of La Azohía and Isla Plana within the natural park of the Sierra de la Muela, Cabo Tiñoso y Roldán, as well as in the area of Cabezos del Pericón y Sierra de los Victorias, protected as a Site of Community Importance.

== Taxonomy ==
It was first described in Sorbas in 1977. Subsequently, new populations of this species were found in other areas of Almeria - as in Turre - and in 2000 some more were discovered in Cartagena, Fuente Álamo and Mazarrón.

Narcissus tortifolius was described by Francisco Javier Fernández Casas and published in Saussurea 8: 43. 1977.

=== Cytology ===
Chromosome number of Narcissus tazetta (Fam. Amaryllidaceae) and infraspecific taxa: n=5 2n=10. 2n=20,21,30,31. 2n=22.

=== Etymology ===
Narcissus generic name referring to the young narcissist of Greek mythology Νάρκισσος (Narkissos) son of the river god Cephissus and the nymph Leiriope; who was distinguished by her beauty.

The name derives from the Greek word: ναρκὰο, narkào (= narcotic) and refers to the pungent, intoxicating odor of the flowers of some species (some argue that the word derives from the Persian word نرگس and pronounced Nargis, indicating that this plant is intoxicating).

tortifolius: Latin for "twisted-leaved", referring to the twisting of its leaves.

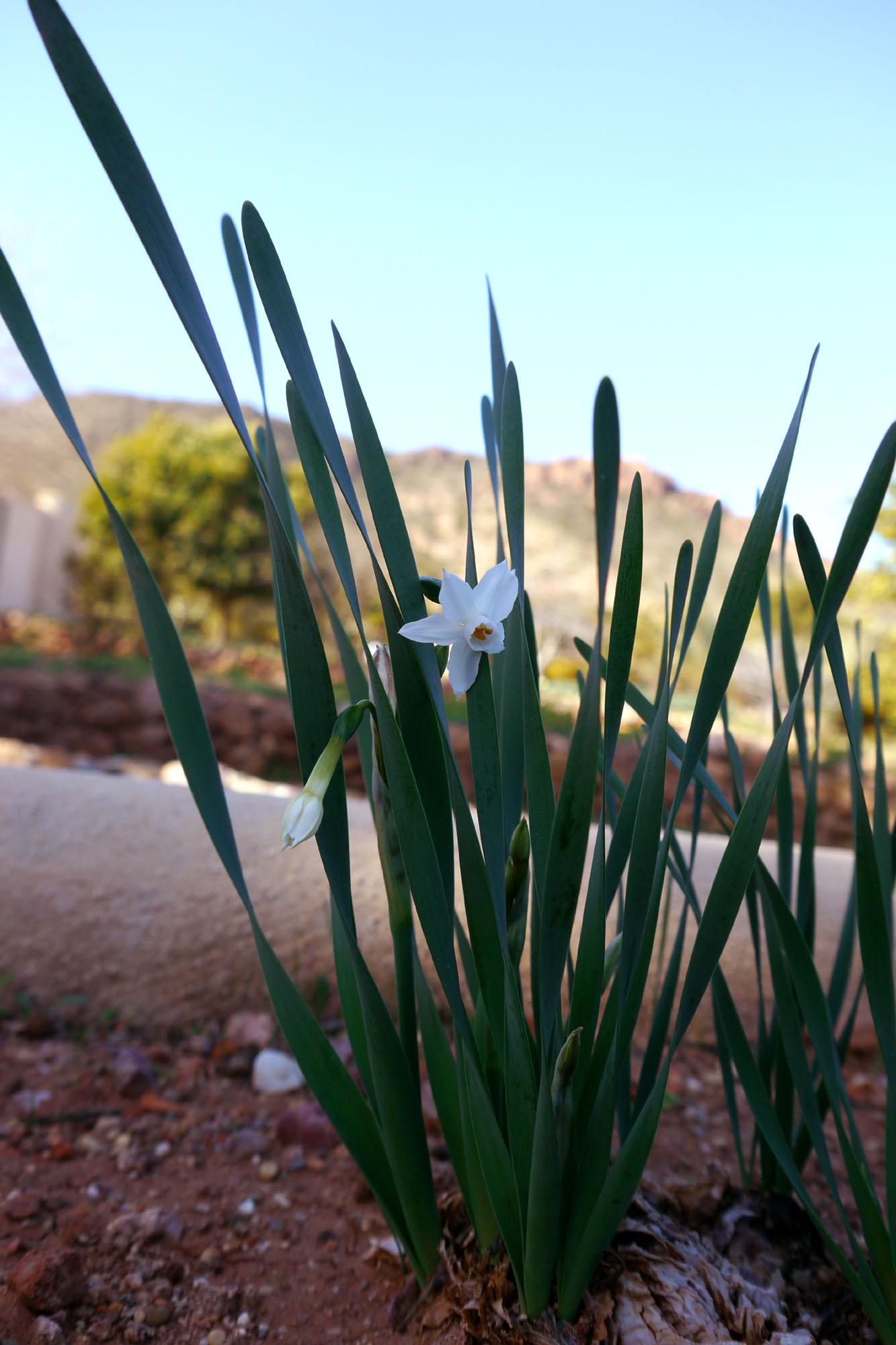
Narcissus tortifolius in the Botanical Garden of Albardinar (Rodalquilar).

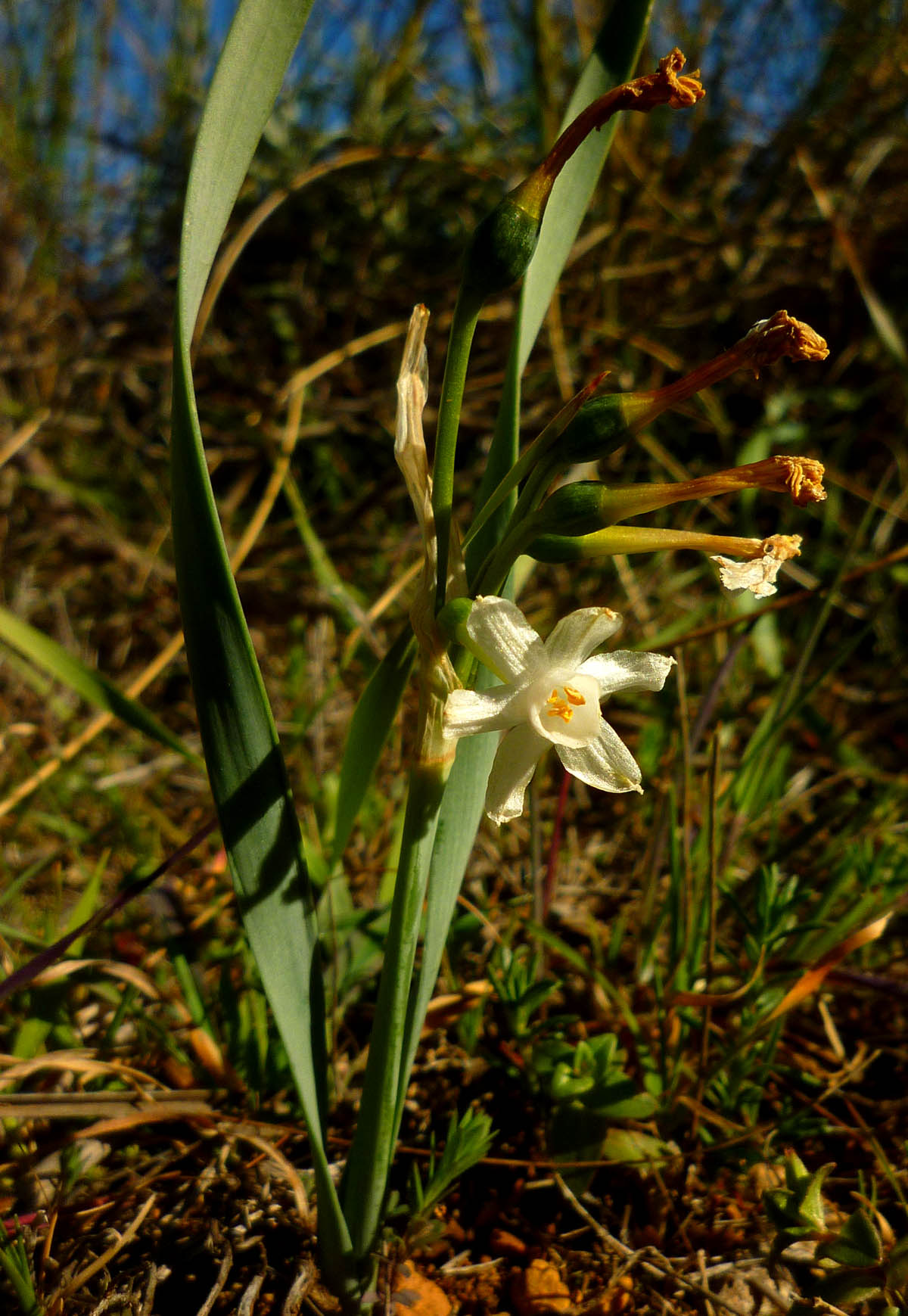
Narcissus tortifolius in Peñas Blancas Cartagena.

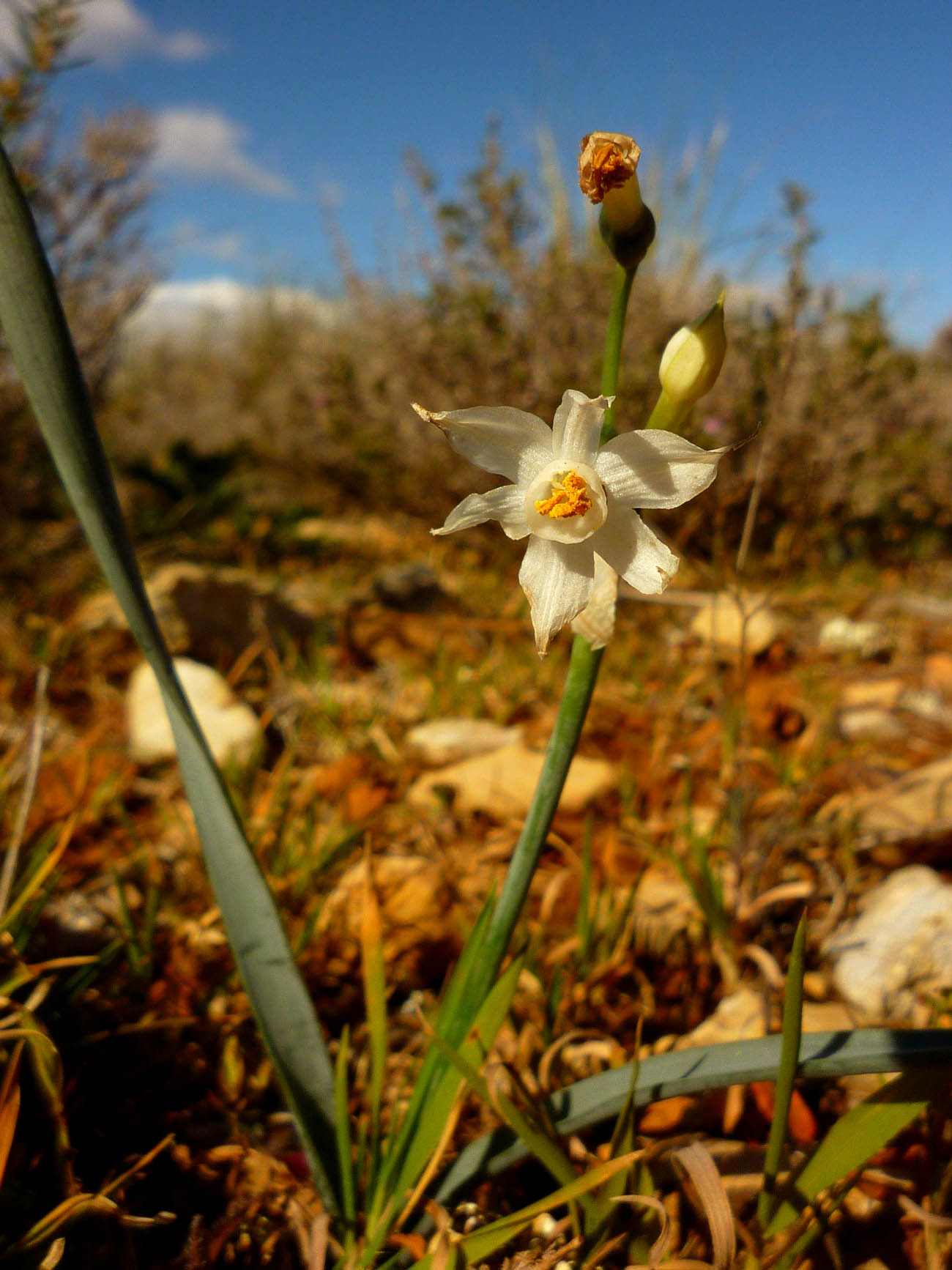
Narcissus tortifolius at Peñas Blancas
