= La Manchica =

- Hamlet town
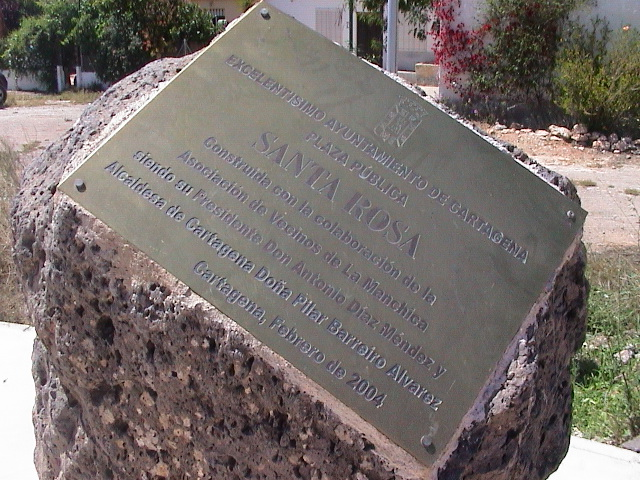

- Flag Coat of arms

- Location in Spain
- Country: Spain
- Autonomous community: Murcia
- Province: Province of Murcia
- Comarca: Campo de Cartagena
- Judicial district: La Manchica

Government
  - Mayor: José López Martínez

Population
  - Total: 35
- Demonym: Cartageneros
- Time zone: UTC+1 (CET)
  - Summer (DST): CEST
- Dialing code: (+34) 968
- Website: Official website

La Manchica is both a village and an area in the autonomous region of Murcia, in southern Spain. The village is situated 5 km south of the town and municipality of Fuente Álamo de Murcia and was established during the Transhumance of shepherds and goat herders from the La Mancha region of Spain. (La Manchica being the diminutive of La Mancha).

The village is located 25 minutes from Cartagena and 35 minutes from San Javier International Airport. La Plaza Santa Rosa is at the centre of the village. The village consists of 17 houses, of which 6 are inhabited throughout the year. The remaining houses are used as weekend or holiday homes by their Spanish owners. Of the 6 inhabited houses 4 are owned by English and the remaining 2 by Spanish. In July 2007 two apartments were constructed in the village. In the village there are no shops, the nearest being in either Las Palas or Fuente Alamo de Murcia, both approximately 5 km distance. There are 35 inhabitants. 24 are English and only 11 are Spanish.
