= Julia Romera Yáñez =

Spanish anarchist activist (1916–1941)

- Born: 5 March 1916; Mazarrón, Murcia, Spain
- Died: 6 September 1941 (aged 25); Barcelona, Spain
- Cause of death: Tuberculosis, torture
- Organizations: Confederación Nacional del Trabajo; Libertarian Youth
- Movement: Anarchism, anti-fascism
- Relatives: José Berruezo Silvente

Julia Romera Yáñez (1916–1941) was a Spanish anarcho-syndicalist activist. She was a member of the Confederación Nacional del Trabajo (CNT) during the time of the Second Spanish Republic, led the Joventuts Llibertàries de Catalunya (JLC) during the Spanish Civil War, and joined the Unió de Joventuts Antifeixistes (UJA) to resist the Spanish State. She died from tuberculosis, aggravated by wounds inflicted by torture, in Les Corts prison.

== Biography ==
Julia Romera Yáñez was the daughter of miner Francisco Romera Rodríguez and Matilde Yáñez Pérez. In 1918, as a result of the influenza pandemic, her parents died within three days of each other. María, her older sister, was left in the care of her maternal grandparents in Cartagena and Julia remained with her paternal grandparents in Mazarrón. In 1921, Murcia was in the middle of an economic crisis; mine closures, persistent drought and widespread unemployment caused a massive emigration to industrialised areas. The Romera family decided to emigrate to Santa Coloma de Gramenet, a town outside Barcelona. In 1930, at the age of 14, Julia started working as a weaver in Can Baró, where many of the workers were affiliated to the Confederación Nacional del Trabajo (CNT).

In 1931, following the proclamation of the Second Spanish Republic, the CNT, which had been underground during the dictatorship of Primo de Rivera, was legalised and reorganised. The Joventuts Llibertàries de Catalunya (JLC) was established soon after. Romera joined the JLC around 1934-35 and soon became a leading figure. Following the outbreak of the Spanish Civil War, in July 1936, most of the young people volunteered to go to the front and Romera was appointed secretary general, a position she combined with that of treasurer; she also collaborated with International Red Aid (MOPR) and worked as editor-in-chief of the magazine Aurora Libre. On 27 January 1939, the Army of Africa occupied Santa Coloma. Many Republicans went into exile, but Romera at the time was caring for her ailing grandmother, and despite the advice of her colleagues, she decided to stay behind.

By May 1939, Romera had joined the Unió de Joventuts Antifeixistes (UJA), a group of young anti-fascists that attempted to carry out guerrilla warfare against the Spanish State. They were discovered and, on 30 May 1939, many of their members were arrested. They were found in possession of a typewriter, five rifles, three rifles and ammunition. Romera was taken to the Civil Guard headquarters where she was held incommunicado. For three days she was interrogated, tortured and humiliated, but she made no confession. On 2 June, unable to walk, disfigured and with her belly swollen from internal injuries, she was transferred to the Cervantes Theatre in Badalona, which had been converted into a prison, and was subsequently remanded in custody in the Les Corts prison in Barcelona.

On 2 January 1940, the court-martial of the UJA was held, in which twenty-five people (three of them minors) were tried. The prosecutor asked for the death penalty for Romera, but she was finally sentenced to life imprisonment. When Romera entered Les Corts, there were 1,400 inmates, food was scarce and living conditions were harsh. She shared a cell with Conxita Vives and the actress Maruja Tomás. At the end of the summer of 1941, after suffering from recurrent fevers, the prison doctor diagnosed her with advanced tuberculosis, aggravated by the serious internal injuries she had suffered as a result of torture and poor living conditions. She was admitted to the prison infirmary and died on 6 September at 22:00, having refused the spiritual help offered by the prison priest. Romera's companions raised some money so that she could have a proper funeral.

== Historical memory and recognition ==
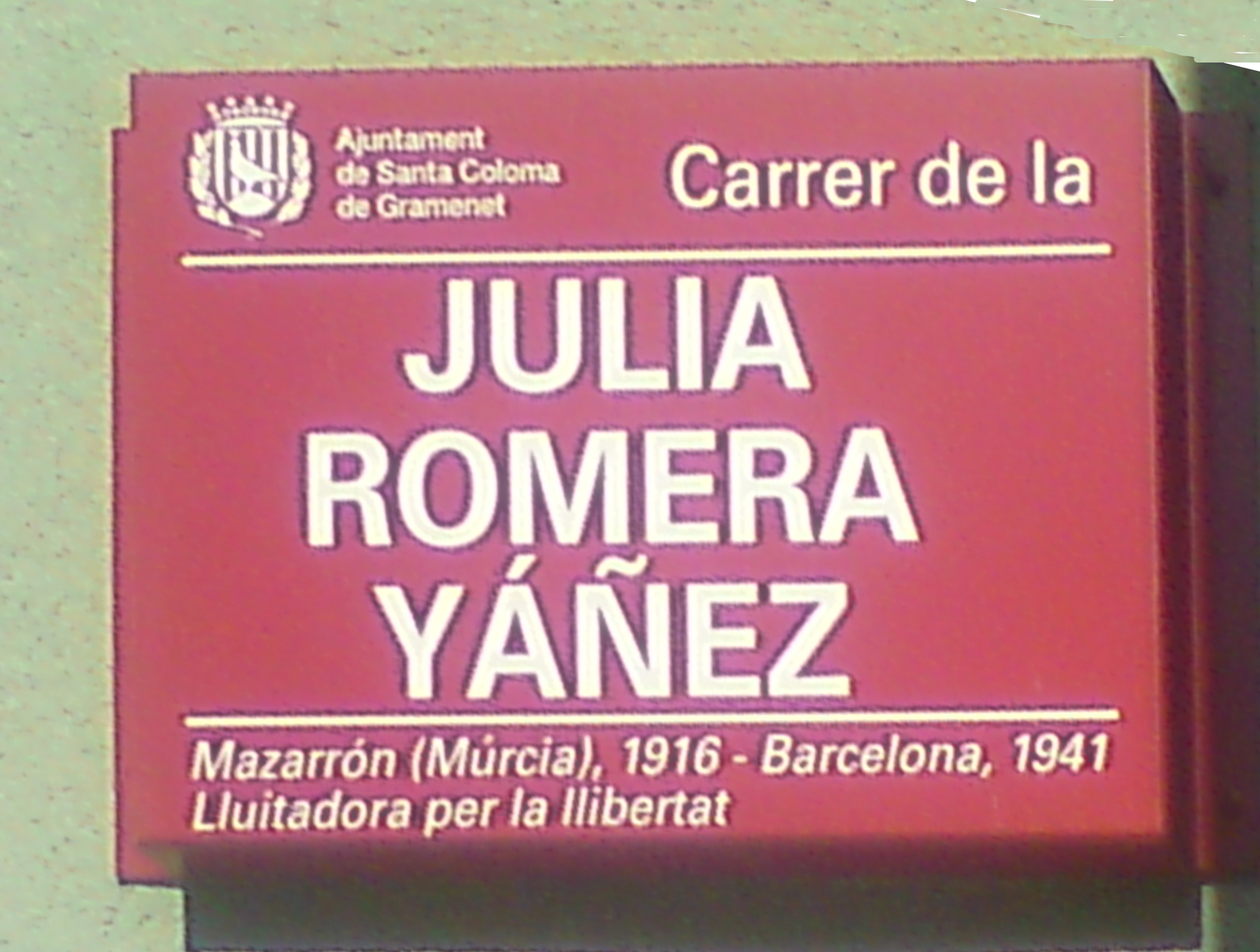
Street sign of Carrer de Julia Romera Yáñez

In 2002, as a culmination of neighbourhood petitions, an Ateneo Popular named after Romera was inaugurated in Santa Coloma de Gramanet. In 2016, an exhibition and a tribute to Julia Romera Yáñez was organised by the José Berruezo history group. In 2017, as part of the actions to recover the historical memory of Santa Coloma de Gramanet, the Francoist name of the Passatge de la Victòria was changed to Carrer de la Julia Romera Yáñez. The plaque reads "Lluitadora per la llibertat" (English: "Fighter for freedom").

== Bibliography ==
- Berruezo Silvente, José (1987). Por el sendero de mis recuerdos (1920-1939) (in Spanish). Santa Coloma de Gramenet: Grupo de Estudios Históricos-Sociales. ISBN 84-398-7726-9.
- Egea Bruno, Pedro María (1986). El distrito minero de Cartagena en torno a la primera Guerra Mundial (1909-1923). Murcia: University of Murcia. ISBN 8476840195.
- Gallardo Romero, Juan José; Marquez Rodriguez, José Manuel (1997). Revolución y Guerra en Gramanet del Besós (1936-1939) (in Spanish). Santa Coloma de Gramenet: Grupo de Estudios Históricos Gramenet del Besòs. ISBN 84-88455-36-4.
- Gallardo Romero, Juan José (2000). Los origenes del movimiento obrero en Santa Coloma de Gramanet, El anarcosindicalismo (1923-1936). Santa Coloma de Gramenet: Grupo de Historia José Berruezo. ISBN 9788493051242.
- Oyon, José Luis (2004). El Cinturón Rojinegro, Radicalismo Cenetista y Obrerismo en la Periféria de Barcelona (1918-1939). Ediciones Carena. ISBN 84-96357-04-X.
- Sody de Rivas, Ángel (2000). "Julia Romera Yáñez". Àgora: Revista Història de Santa Coloma de Gramanet (5). Santa Coloma de Gramenet: Grup de Història José Berruezo. ISBN 84-930512-3-3.
- Sody de Rivas, Ángel (2016). Julia Romera Yañez (1916-1941): Vida y muerte de una luchadora por la libertad (in Spanish). Santa Coloma de Gramenet: Edición Colectivo "José Berruezo".
