= AD Las Palas =

Spanish football team

Las Palas
- Full name: Agrupación Deportiva Las Palas
- Founded: 1982
- Dissolved: 2008
- Ground: El Arenal, Las Palas, Región de Murcia, Spain
- Capacity: 4,000
- 2007–08: 3ª – Group 13, 8th
| Home colours | Away colours |

Agrupación Deportiva Las Palas was a Spanish football team based in Las Palas, in the autonomous community of Murcia; its home games were held at the Estadio El Arenal, with a capacity of 4,000.

== History ==
It was founded in 1982 and dissolved in 2008.

== Season to season ==
| Season | Tier | Division | Place | Copa del Rey |
|---|---|---|---|---|
| 1982–83 | 7 | 2ª Reg. | 12th | |
| 1983–84 | 7 | 2ª Reg. | 4th | |
| 1984–85 | 7 | 2ª Reg. | 7th | |
| 1985–86 | 7 | 2ª Reg. | 9th | |
| 1986–87 | 7 | 2ª Reg. | 5th | |
| 1987–88 | 7 | 2ª Reg. | 1st | |
| 1988–89 | 6 | 1ª Reg. | 3rd | |
| 1989–90 | 5 | Reg. Pref. | 13th | |
| 1990–91 | 5 | Reg. Pref. | 6th | |
| 1991–92 | 5 | Reg. Pref. | 11th | |
| 1992–93 | 5 | Reg. Pref. | 3rd | |
| 1993–94 | 4 | 3ª | 11th | |
| 1994–95 | 4 | 3ª | 6th | |

| Season | Tier | Division | Place | Copa del Rey |
|---|---|---|---|---|
| 1995–96 | 4 | 3ª | 6th | |
| 1996–97 | 4 | 3ª | 6th | |
| 1997–98 | 4 | 3ª | 5th | |
| 1998–99 | 4 | 3ª | 6th | |
| 1999–2000 | 4 | 3ª | 6th | |
| 2000–01 | 4 | 3ª | 8th | |
| 2001–02 | 4 | 3ª | 13th | |
| 2002–03 | 4 | 3ª | 13th | |
| 2003–04 | 4 | 3ª | 13th | |
| 2004–05 | 4 | 3ª | 13th | |
| 2005–06 | 4 | 3ª | 8th | |
| 2006–07 | 4 | 3ª | 9th | |
| 2007–08 | 4 | 3ª | 8th | |

- 15 seasons in Tercera División
