= Alhama de Murcia =

- Municipality
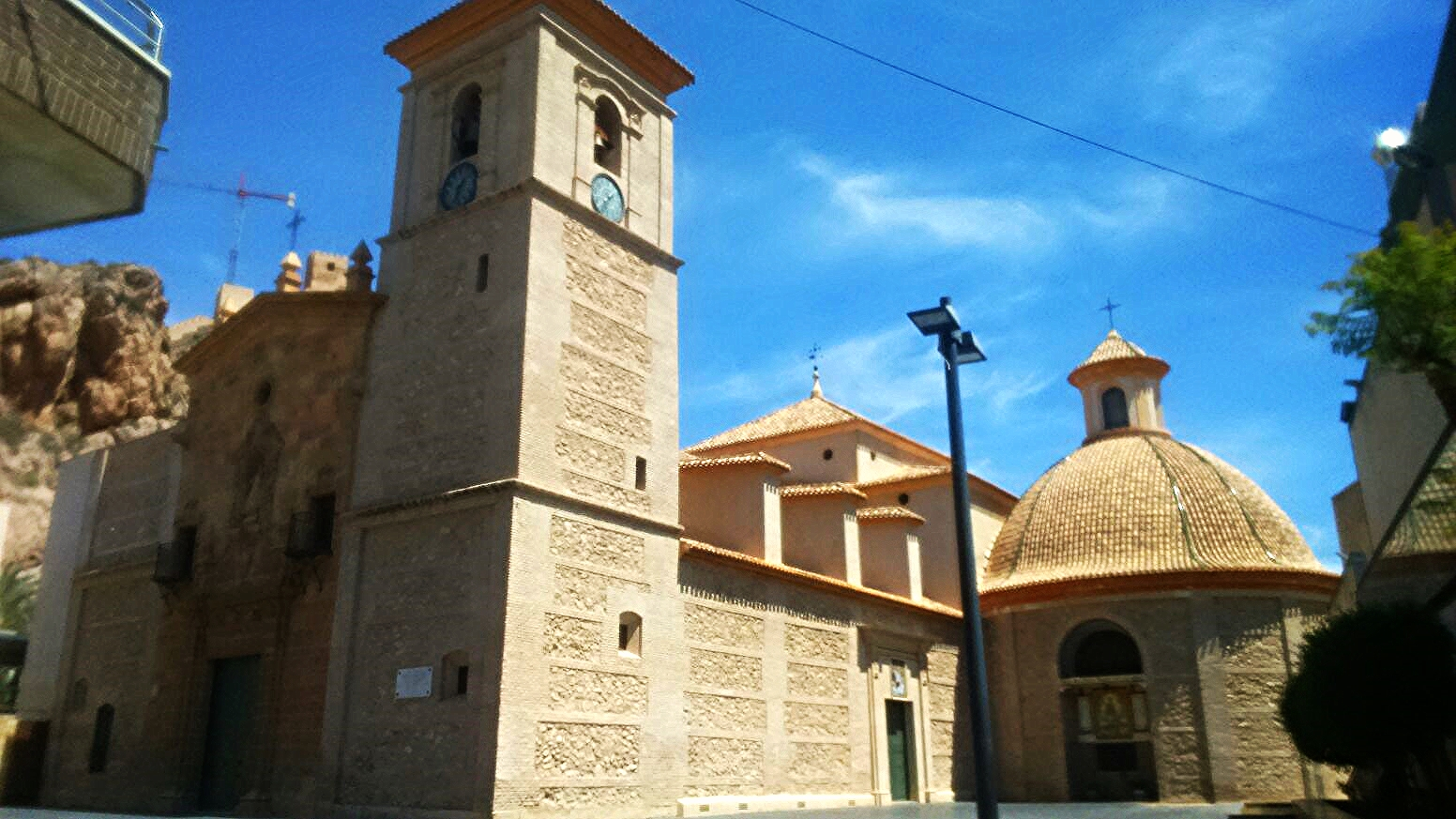
- Town hall.

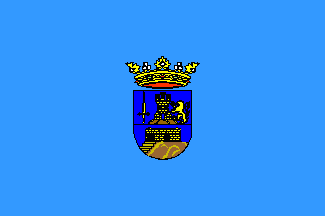
- Flag Coat of arms

- Location in Murcia

- Location in Murcia Location in Spain
- Country: Spain
- Autonomous community: Murcia
- Province: Murcia
- Comarca: Bajo Guadalentín
- Judicial district: Totana

Government
  - Mayor: Alfonso Fernando Cerón Morales

Area
  - Total: 311.55 km^{2} (120.29 sq mi)
- Elevation: 176 m (577 ft)

Population (2025-01-01)
  - Total: 24,163
  - Density: 77.557/km^{2} (200.87/sq mi)
- Demonym: Alhameños
- Website: Official website

Alhama de Murcia is a Spanish municipality in the autonomous community of the Region of Murcia. It is located in the north of the southern half of the region. The municipality shares borders with Librilla in its north, Murcia in its northeast, Fuente Álamo de Murcia in its east, Mazarrón in its south, Totana in its west and Mula in its northwest.

== Geography ==
=== Physical geography ===
The west of Sierra de Carrascoy mountain range occupies part of the east of Alhama de Murcia. Guadalentín River traverses the municipality from its south-west to its north-east. The territory is especially raised in the north-west, where some raised landforms occur and the south-eastern foot of Sierra Espuña mountain range occurs, and even the north-west end of Alhama de Murcia occupies the mountain range itself.

=== Human geography ===
The inhabitants of the municipality are distributed in the following localities: Alhama de Murcia, which is located in the south-east of the north-west and is inhabited by 19,265 people; Las Cañadas, which is placed in the north-east and is populated by 903 people; La Costera, which occurs in the north-west and is home to 310 people; El Cañarico, which is located in the north-east end and is inhabited by 154 people; El Berro, which is placed in the north-west and its population consists of 140 and El Gebas, that is home to 24 people and occurs in the north-west.

== History ==
A defensive construction of the late Bronze Age has been found in the north of the municipality. During the Roman Iberian Peninsula era, there was also presence of people in the current municipality and in the current town. The most remarkable remain of that era is the Roman thermal baths.

There is also evidence of the presence of people in the Muslim Iberian Peninsula era. The most remarkable construction is the Castle of Alhama, but there are other remains.

The Battle of Faḥṣ al-Jullāb between the Almohad Caliphate and the Taifa of Murcia was fought here on 15 October 1165.

== Demographics ==
19.22% inhabitants are foreigners – 4.7% come from other countries of Europe, 18.38 are African and 3.8% are American. The table below shows the population trend during the 20th and the 21st centuries by the beginning of their decades.

	1900	1910	1920	1930	1940	1950	1960	1970	1981	1991	2001	2011
Population	8,410	9,207	9,743	10,042	11,083	11,344	11,786	11,600	13,132	14,175	16,316	20,560

== Economy ==
Agriculture is highly performed in the municipality. 34.2% of the territory is utilised for crop purposes. The most widely grown products are the grapes, oranges, lettuces, and cauliflowers and broccoli. 37.43% of the contracts corresponded to jobs in the agriculture sector and 50.86% were written for labourers. 43.01% of the agreements were about service sector in 2018 and 17.56% about industry jobs.

== Facilities ==
=== Healthcare ===
There is a consultorio (a primary care centre with the fewest functions) in La Costera, another one in El Cañarico, and another one in El Berro. The main town hosts a centro de salud (a primary care centre).

=== Education ===
Five early childhood and primary education centres (CEIP) and two secondary education centres (IES) can be found in the main town. There is also an early childhood and primary education centre in El Berro, another one in Venta de los Carrascos and another one in Los Ventorillos.

== Main sights ==
- Castle of Alhama de Murcia
- Plaza Vieja Cultural Centre: it was built in the 18th century and was the town council from 1923 to 1986. Currently, the building serve as the municipal library and hosts the exhibition hall.
- Provisions market: it was built in 1928 and was designed by the architect Pedro Celdrán, an architect who designed several notable buildings in the Region of Murcia.

== Notable people ==
- Braulia Cánovas (1920–1993) Spanish Republican who fought in French Resistance as "Monique" and survived Nazi concentration camps.
- TheGrefg (born 1997), Spanish streamer.
- Antonio Peñalver (born 1968), decathlete.

== See also ==
- List of municipalities in the Region of Murcia
