= Braulia Cánovas =

Spanish military personnel (1920–1993)

Braulia Cánovas Mulero
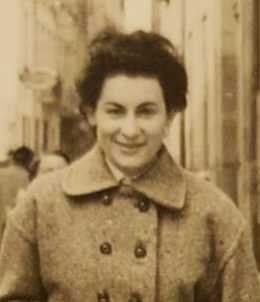
- Born: 8 January 1920; Alhama de Murcia, Spain
- Died: 23 December 1993 (aged 73); Barcelona, Spain
- Occupation: Spanish member of the French Resistance during Second World War

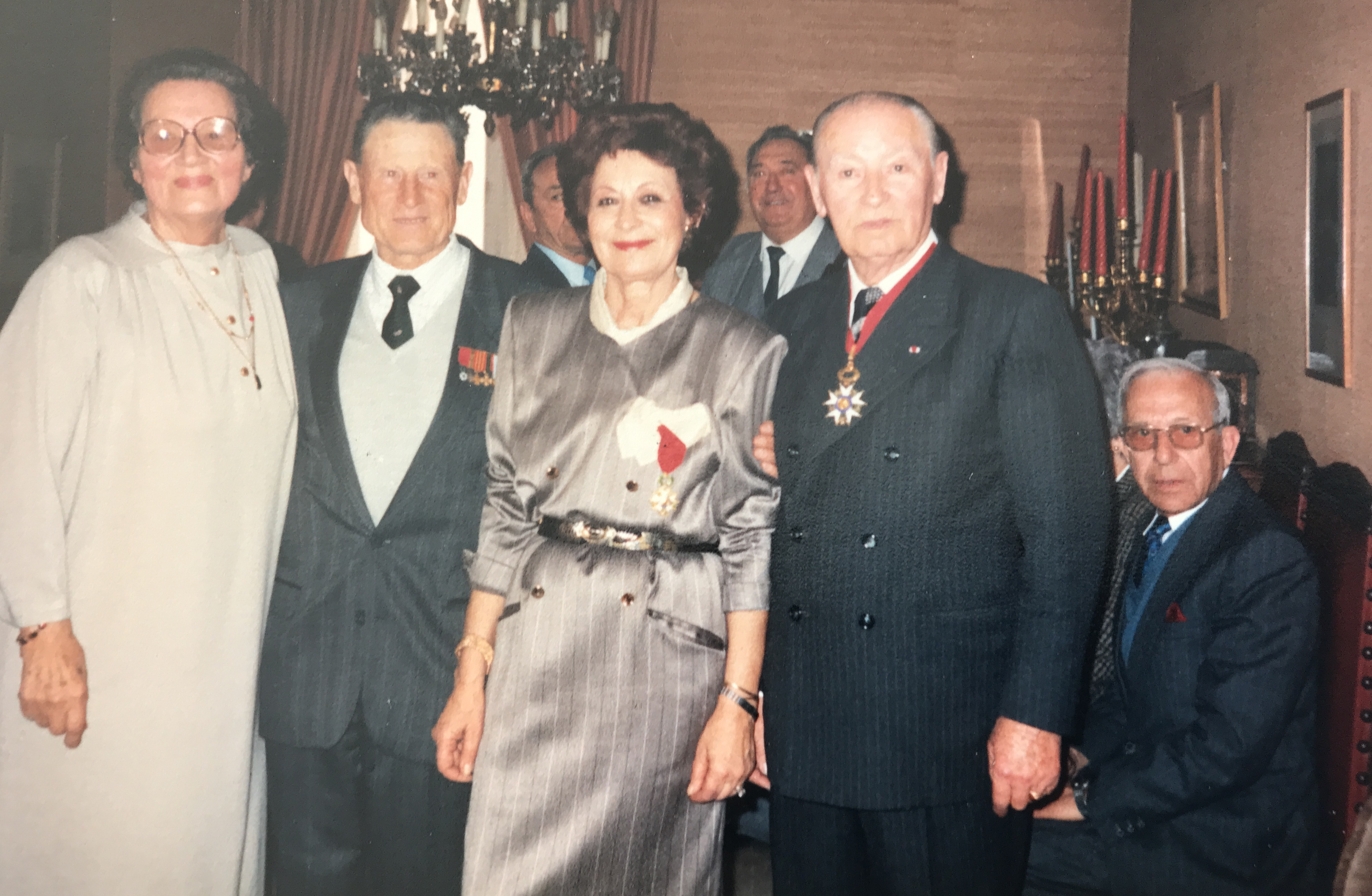
Braulia Cánovas in 1988 wearing the cross of Officier de la Légion d'honneur awarded by the French Government

Braulia Cánovas Mulero (8 January 1920 – 23 December 1993) was a Spanish Republican who fought against the Nazis in the French Resistance, under the codename "Monique". She survived the Nazi concentration camps and was liberated from Bergen-Belsen on 15 April 1945. In 2018, she was honoured by her local town council along with four other Alhameños who were victims of the Nazi concentration camps.

== Biography ==
Braulia Cánovas was born in Alhama de Murcia on 8 January 1920, the daughter of María Mulero Melgarejo and Francisco Cánovas Rubio. Her father died in Madrid during the Spanish Civil War at the hands of the Nationalist faction. The family migrated to Barcelona around 1930. After the defeat of the Republic, the family crossed the Pyrenees and went into exile in France from the dictatorship.

Cánovas fought against the Nazis in the French Resistance and was known by the codename "Monique". On 9 May 1943, she was arrested by the Nazi army in Perpignan and transferred on 16 May to the military prison in Fresnes. She was then transferred to the Royallieu-Compiègne internment camp and on 3 February 1944 she was deported to the Ravensbrück concentration camp for women. She travelled there in a convoy with 27,000 other women.

In Ravensbrück, Cánovas was issued the number No. 27,697 and, after some time, she became part of a forced labour group with 1,000 other women, set up by the Continental Gummi-Werke company for the manufacture of gas masks in Hannover-Limmer. When Allied tank units crossed the River Weser near Minden in the early hours of 6 April 1945, the camp was evacuated and the women were forced to undertake a death march northwards, which ended at Bergen-Belsen concentration camp. On 15 April 1945 she was liberated by British troops; she weighed only 35 kg (c. 5.5 stone) at the time.

== Postwar ==
Cánovas married and had a family after the war. Braulia Cánovas Mulero died in Barcelona on 23 December 1993.

== Recognition ==
Shortly after the end of the Second World War, the French government awarded Cánovas a military Chevalier de la Légion d'Honneur, as a sign of gratitude for her fight for freedom against fascism. Subsequently, in 1984, again by the French Government, she was awarded the cross of Officier de la Légion d'honneur in a military capacity, a recognition that was only given to a few Spaniards. By contrast, she was never officially recognised by the Spanish State during her lifetime.

== Commemoration ==
In 2012, Cánovas' name appeared on the official list of people who helped France during the Nazi occupation, proposed for recognition by the United States Armed Forces.

On 30 January 2018, all the groups with municipal representation in Alhama de Murcia (Spanish Socialist Workers' Party, the People's Party (Spain), United Left–Greens of the Region of Murcia and Citizens (Spanish political party)), agreed to recognise the Alhameños imprisoned and murdered in Nazi concentration camps. In May 2018, the City Council of Alhama de Murcia unveiled a monument in honour of five local residents: Braulia Cánovas Mulero, Antonio Martínez Baños, Francisco Aledo Martínez, José María Martínez Costa and José Cerón García, with a monument located in the Jardín de los Mártires (Martyrs' Garden). It is inscribed: 'A los alhameños prisioneros en campos de concentración nazi por su compromiso con la libertad'. (To the Alhameños imprisoned in Nazi concentration camps for their commitment to freedom)'. This commemoration was the result of several years of work by historian Víctor Peñalver, persuaded several councils in the region of Murcia to recognise those deported by the Franco regime.

At the end of 2018, her daughter and other family members went to Germany to retrieve the ring and watch that had been taken from her by the Nazis during her captivity. These belongings were handed over by the Arolsen Archives - International Center on Nazi Persecution, based in the German town of Bad Arolsen, which is dedicated to returning stolen objects to Nazi victims with the help of the German Government. The family received no support from the Spanish government in these efforts.

== See also ==
- Mauthausen concentration camp
- Identification of inmates in Nazi concentration camps

== Bibliography ==
- 2012 – Memorial de las españolas deportadas a Ravensbrück. Teresa del Hoyo Calduch. Editorial: Amics de Ravensbrück, Barcelona.
- 2017 – Els catalans als camps nazis. Montserrat Roig. Grupo Planeta. ISBN 9788499426327.
