= Drought in Spain =

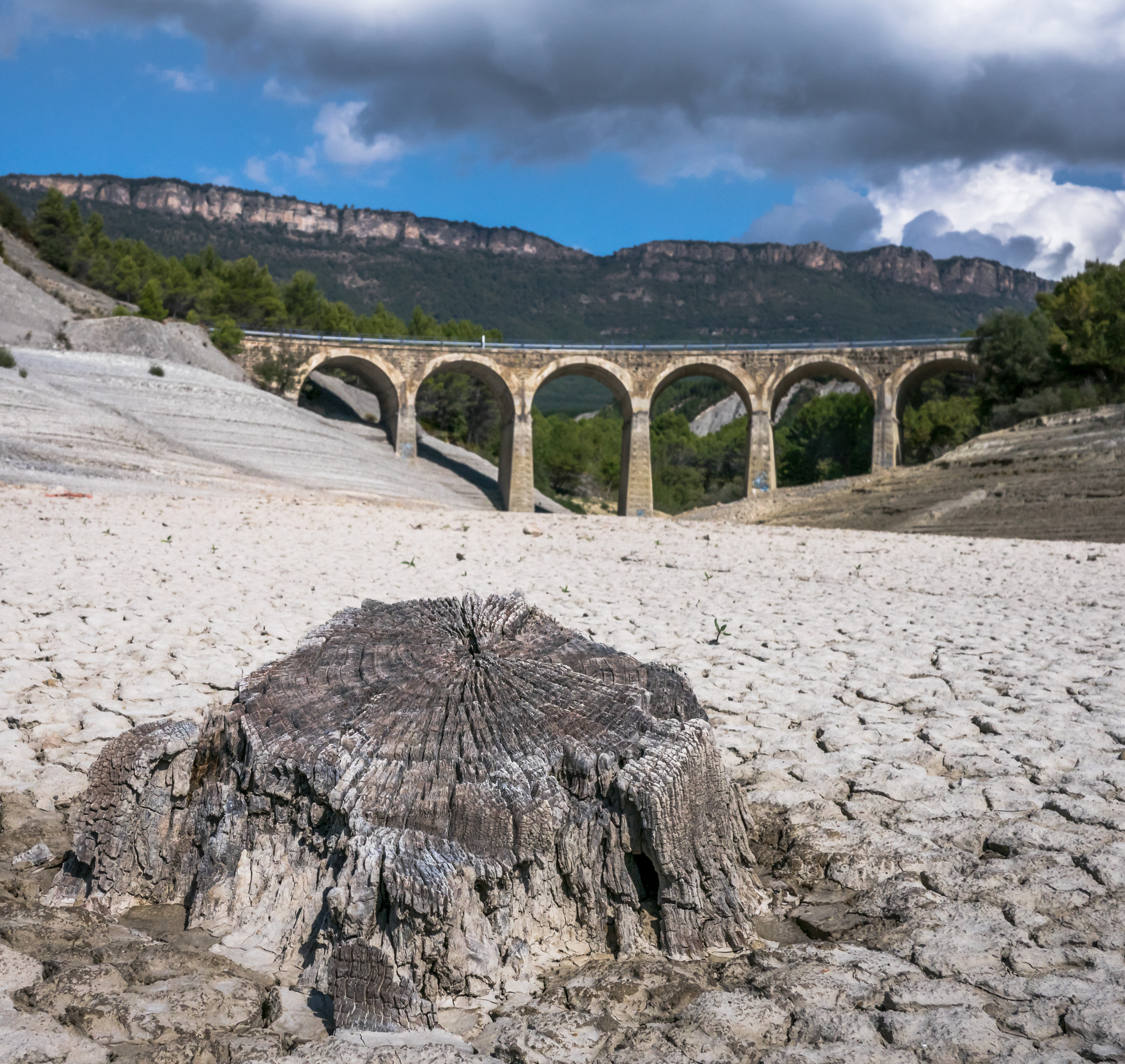
Low-water level at the Yesa reservoir in Aragon

All territories of Spain are subject to droughts to some degree given the location of the country to the south of the westerlies, although their impact and frequence is uneven. Droughts occur when precipitation is considerably reduced during the theoretically rainy months of the year.

== Overview ==
Four types of climatic droughts can be defined: Cantabrian (coyuntural and low-frequence droughts), Iberian (droughts usually affecting the entire Iberian Peninsula, except the Cantabrian façade), southeastern (structural droughts, the mirror opposite of the Cantabrian ones) and Canarian droughts.

The drought, along with high winds and fallen cables, is being looked at as a prime causal factor in forest fires.

In 2012 Spain experienced the driest period since the 1940s, with rainfall decreased by up to 75%.

Most rain in Spain falls in the winter as wet, low-pressure systems coming from the Atlantic Ocean, but a high-pressure system called the Azores high can block these weather fronts coming from the Atlantic Ocean (Carrington, 2022). From 1850 to 1980, the frequency of this high-pressure system, Azores High, was once every seven years. But data has shown that after 1980 the frequency became once every four years. The problem of the Azores high is that it reduces about one third of the monthly rainfall in the winters (Carrington, 2022).

Since the industrial revolution, the Azores high, which is also called the Gatekeeper of European Rainfall has become more frequent. Research has shown that the Azores High has expanded as the earth has warmed (Tandon, 2022). The expansion of the Azores High will intensify the drought in Portugal and Spain, and it's expected that these two regions will see a 10-20% drop in winter precipitation in upcoming winters.

== See also ==
- European Drought Observatory (EDO)
- 2022 European drought
