= Fuente Álamo de Murcia =

- Municipality
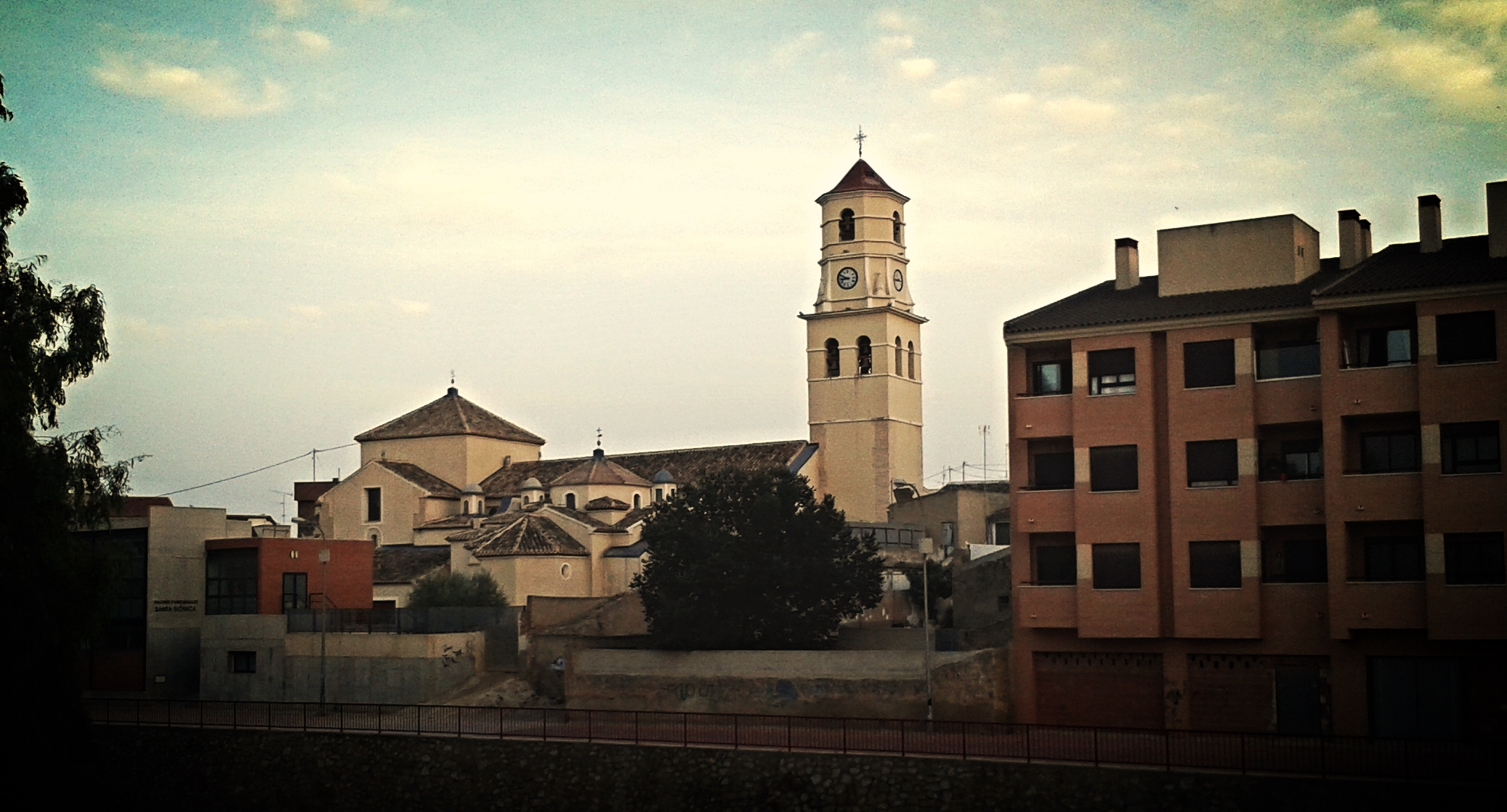
- Fuente Álamo

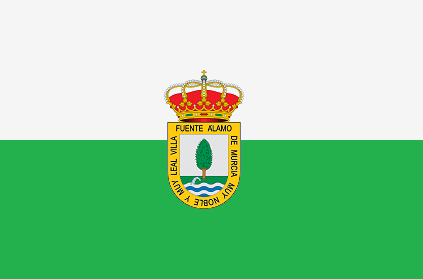
- Flag Coat of arms
- Motto: Muy Noble y Muy Leal Villa
- Location in Murcia

- Location in Murcia Location in Spain
- Country: Spain
- Autonomous community: Murcia
- Province: Murcia
- Comarca: Campo de Cartagena
- Judicial district: Cartagena
- Founded: 15th century, from 1700 Villazgo

Government
  - Mayor: María Antonia Conesa Legaz (2003) (PP)

Area
  - Total: 273 km^{2} (105 sq mi)
- Elevation: 127 m (417 ft)
- Highest elevation: 1,062 m (3,484 ft)
- Lowest elevation: 82 m (269 ft)

Population (2025-01-01)
  - Total: 19,171
  - Density: 70.2/km^{2} (182/sq mi)
- Demonym: Fuentealameros
- Time zone: UTC+1 (CET)
  - Summer (DST): UTC+2 (CEST)
- Postal code: 30320
- Website: Official website

Fuente Álamo de Murcia is a town and municipality in the Region of Murcia, southern Spain. It is situated 22 km northwest of Cartagena and 35 km south west of Murcia. The town lies in the basin of the Mar Menor surrounded by the mountains of Algarrobo, Los Gómez, Los Victorias and the Carrascoy.

The water from these mountains flows down into the Rambla de Fuente Álamo and then onto the Mar Menor. The highest point in the region is the "Eagles Rock" at 1,066m, situated in the Carrascoy mountains.

The town is known locally as Fuente Álamo (without using "de Murcia").

== History ==
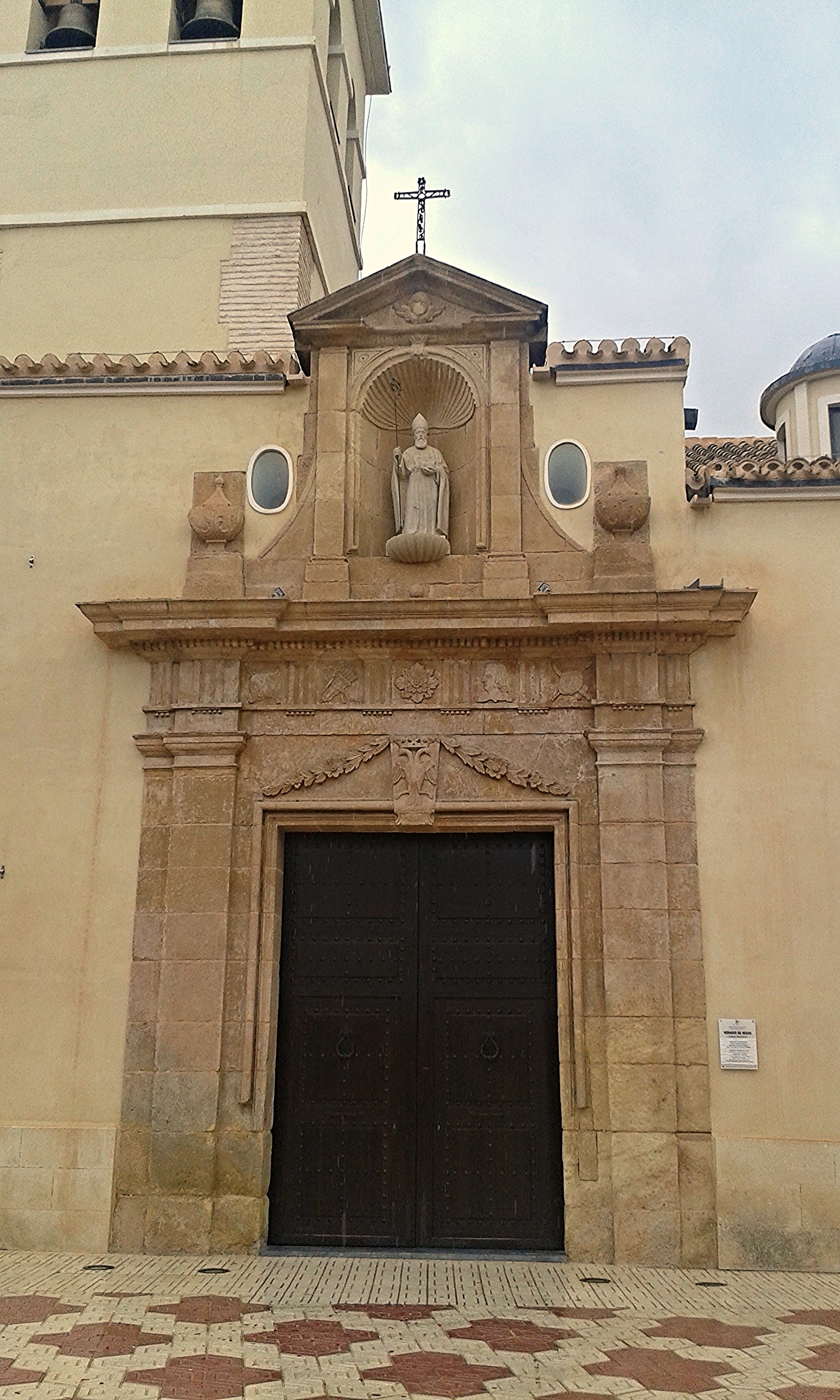
Principal entrance of S.t Augustine church

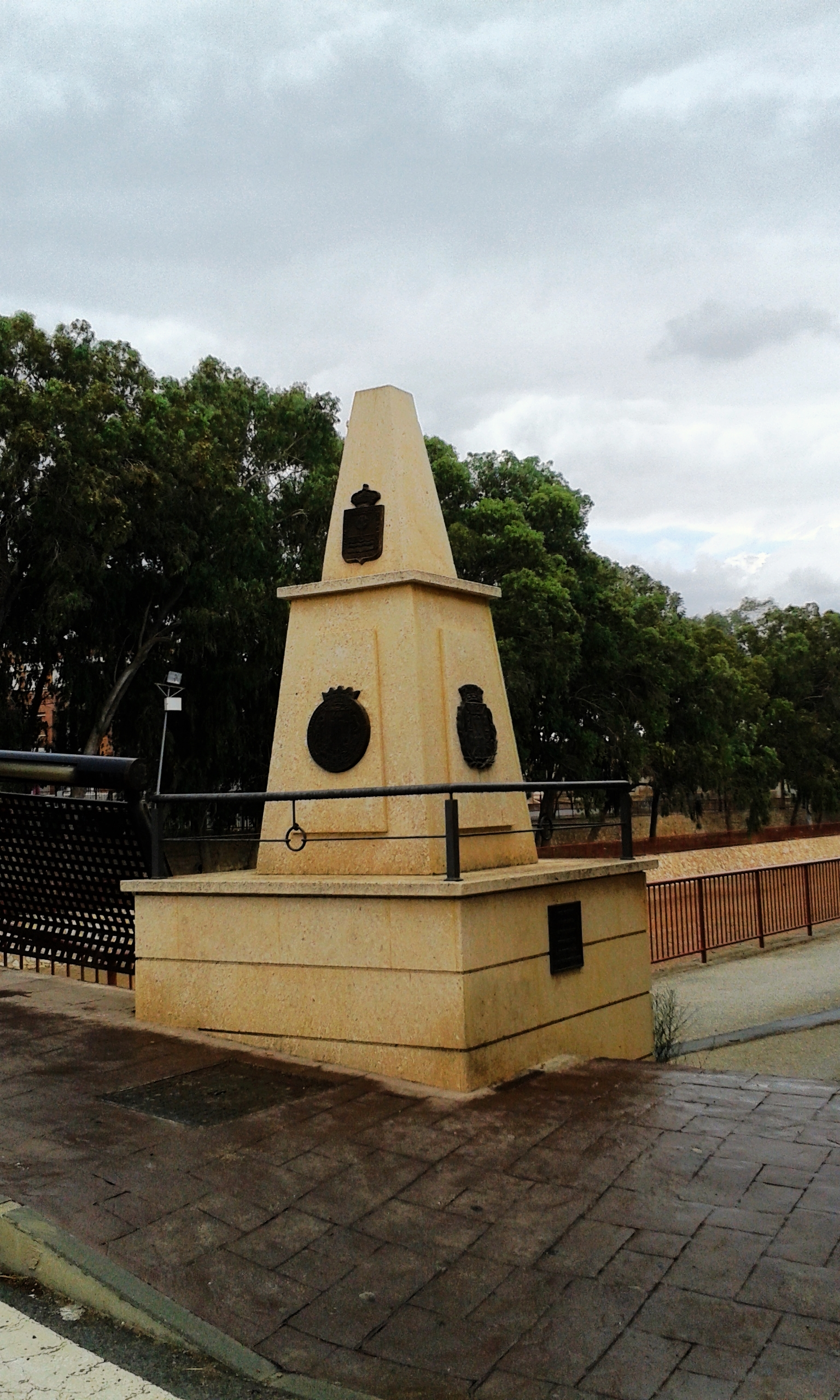
Monument. Former border between Murcia, Cartagena and Lorca

The town can trace its history back to 1520, although there was activity in and around the site of the town several years prior to this date. The area was used for Transhumance by the shepherds and goat herders from La Mancha and there is a village and area named La Manchica (little La Mancha) to the south of Fuente Álamo.

In 1463 the area was referred to as "La Fuente del Alamo" in a dispute over who actually owned the land between the peoples of Cartagena.

In 1500 the council of Lorca, in an effort to assert its authority, started to allocate small sections of land to the population for the use of cultivation. The area was controlled by the "Three Councils" of Murcia, Lorca and Cartagena.

Permission was sought to build the first church in 1545.

On 5 July 1700 Fuente Álamo was Granted authority from King Charles II to exist as an independent township and 20 July that year elected its first mayor Gregorio Reyllo Hernández. The three councils, because each had a vested interest in controlling Fuente Álamo objected to this decree of independence and on 1 April 1702 King Felipe V rescinded the privilege of Fuente Álamo to exist independently. The title of mayor was then given on a yearly basis to a citizen of the three councils on a rotation basis. This situation was to exist until 1820 when full independence was restored.

During the latter part of the 18th century and the beginning of the 19th century the town declined due to the pollution of its water source. Some 3000 residents left and settled in the surrounding villages, and by 1822 only 9 houses were occupied in the town.

Napoleon's troops occupy the town in August 1823.

In 1939 shortly before the end of the civil war, Republican forces sank the troop carrier Castillo de Olite as it was leaving the port of Cartagena. Of the 2112 people on board 1476 were killed, 342 were injured and 294 were taken prisoner. The captured were transferred to Fuente Álamo where they were imprisoned. In 1966, in recognition of the services given by the people of the town, General Francisco Franco awarded Fuente Álamo with the title "Muy Noble y Muy Leal Villa" (Most noble and most loyal town).

== Geography ==
This municipality shares borders with Cartagena at its southeast, Torre-Pacheco at its northeast, Murcia at its north, Alhama de Murcia at its northwest and Mazarrón at its southwest. Approximately, half of its surface is plain and half has mountains reliefs.

A mountain chain named Sierra de Carrascoy occupies the North-West and other ranges whose names are Sierra del Algarrobo and Sierra de Lo Alto stretch its South. At its East more mountain reliefs such as the ranges Sierra de Las Victorias, Sierra de los Gómez and Pericón hillock.

=== Climate ===
Fuente Álamo has a transitional climate between the hot desert climate (BWh on the Köppen climate classification) and the hot semi-arid climate (BSh), with mild winters, hot summers and scarce precipitation. The average annual temperature is about 18.9 °C (66.0 °F), reaching highs of around 33 °C (91 °F) in July and August and lows of 6 °C (43 °F) in January and February. In summer, temperatures exceed 35 °C (95 °F) on several occasions, while in winter they occasionally drop to near 0 °C (32 °F).

Climate data for Álamo de Murcia (2008–2024), extremes (2008-present)
Month	Jan	Feb	Mar	Apr	May	Jun	Jul	Aug	Sep	Oct	Nov	Dec	Year
Record high °C (°F)	27.8 (82.0)	28.1 (82.6)	31.5 (88.7)	36.0 (96.8)	36.4 (97.5)	39.3 (102.7)	43.0 (109.4)	43.2 (109.8)	40.3 (104.5)	34.6 (94.3)	29.7 (85.5)	29.7 (85.5)	43.2 (109.8)
Mean daily maximum °C (°F)	17.0 (62.6)	17.8 (64.0)	19.8 (67.6)	22.1 (71.8)	25.8 (78.4)	30.0 (86.0)	33.1 (91.6)	33.2 (91.8)	29.5 (85.1)	25.4 (77.7)	20.6 (69.1)	17.8 (64.0)	24.3 (75.8)
Daily mean °C (°F)	11.5 (52.7)	12.3 (54.1)	14.2 (57.6)	16.7 (62.1)	20.1 (68.2)	24.1 (75.4)	27.2 (81.0)	27.6 (81.7)	24.3 (75.7)	20.4 (68.7)	15.4 (59.7)	12.3 (54.1)	18.8 (65.9)
Mean daily minimum °C (°F)	5.9 (42.6)	6.9 (44.4)	8.7 (47.7)	11.2 (52.2)	14.3 (57.7)	18.2 (64.8)	21.4 (70.5)	22.0 (71.6)	19.1 (66.4)	15.0 (59.0)	10.2 (50.4)	6.9 (44.4)	13.3 (56.0)
Record low °C (°F)	−1.9 (28.6)	−1.2 (29.8)	0.6 (33.1)	3.5 (38.3)	6.2 (43.2)	11.9 (53.4)	15.6 (60.1)	17.0 (62.6)	13.4 (56.1)	5.3 (41.5)	1.1 (34.0)	−2.4 (27.7)	−2.4 (27.7)
Average precipitation mm (inches)	23.5 (0.93)	6.1 (0.24)	41.0 (1.61)	29.9 (1.18)	22.0 (0.87)	10.9 (0.43)	2.5 (0.10)	7.6 (0.30)	49.9 (1.96)	18.3 (0.72)	34.5 (1.36)	13.5 (0.53)	259.7 (10.23)
Source: Agencia Estatal de Meteorologia

== Demographics ==
The population of the municipality was in steady decline from 1950 until 2001 when it experienced a rapid growth due to foreigners taking up residence in the area. In the Murcia region as a whole in 2008 non Spanish residents account for 18.25% of the population.

The municipality has currently a population of 16,184. The inhabitants are distributed in the following localities: Fuente Álamo with 9,603 people; Balsapintada, where 1848 people live; Cuevas de Reyllo, with 1696 residents; Las Palas, whose population consists of 1449; Los Cánovas, inhabited by 778 people; El Escobar, which has 457 inhabitants; El Estrecho, where 450 people are residing; Pinilla, which has a population of 337; Los Almagros, whose population consists of 261 and Los Paganes, where 107 people live.

== Economy ==
In the primary sector, there are largely carried out economic activities such as farming growing and agricultural package, distribution and selling arrangement. Thirty-six point two percent of the total jobs were about agriculture activities in the fourth trimester of 2018 according to the Spanish Social Security organism. 69.5 percent of the lands of the municipality were worked as crop fields in the year 2017. In regards to economy activities related to animals, the main activities are pork cattle breed and pork cattle trading. To a lesser extent, sheep herd grew and sheep herd trading are done.

In the tertiary sector, an economic activity which is present is the land transportation by road, specially with lorries.

== Main sights ==
- Parish church of San Agustín (16th century): The date of the construction of this religious building is unknown, but has probably been constructed in the year 1583. However, the date of 1783 is engraved on the frontispiece of the church because the building was largely remodelled.
- Little shrine of San Roque: This is the first religious building built in the municipality and the one that has more history background in Fuente Álamo. The origin of the shrine dates in the 16th century.
- Aljibón de Corverica: This structure has the date in the 19th century and is catalogued as the biggest tank in Región de Murcia. Its depth consists of 5 metres and its radius consists of 6. It is semispheric-boved shaped and it is composed of limestone and sheathed with lime and sand mortar.
- Puente Viejo ("Old Bridge")

== Festivals ==
Patron Saint Festivity: The festivity takes place in the last days of August and is consecrated to Augustine of Hippo.

=== Festivities in villages ===
The villages in the municipality have their own festivities, generally with a patron saint origin.

- Balsapintada Festivity:This festivity is consecrated to James, son of Zebedee. It is held during 10 days, and it begins in the last but one Friday of July. The main day of the festivity is 25 July.
- Las Palas Festivity: This festivity is consecrated to Saint Peter.It is held on the last days of June and in at least one day of July.
- Cuevas de Reyllo Festivity: It is held during 10 days in October and the main festive day is 7 October. It is consecrated to Virgin in her title of Our Lady of The Rosary, in other words, the Virgin Mary is held in a facet in which is related to a Catholic traditional praying named Holy Rosary (Rosario in Spanish).
- Los Almagros Festivity: It is held during the first days of September. It is consecrated to the 'Virgen de la Luz', a title of the Virgin Mary. In other words, it is consecrated to the Virgin Mary in a facet in which she is related to the light (luz in Spanish).
- La Pinilla Festivity: This event takes place on 8 September and is also consecrate to the 'Virgen de la Luz'.
- Los Cánovas Festivity: This event takes place during the first days of October and is consecrated to the patron saint of the Village Francis of Assisi.
- El Escobar Patron Saint Festivity:This festivity is held on the last but one week of June and is consecrated to John the Baptist.
- Las Cuadrillas Festivity: This festivity is held on 27 December. At first, a mass is held in El Escobar. Next, people in the village attend a dance event in which everybody dance. Lastly, a group of people are singing while they are traversing the streets of the village.
- El Estrecho Festivity: The reason for this festivity is the Feast of the Cross. The event lasts 10 days and begins on the last Friday of April.

== Twin towns ==
- Ouveillan, France

== Notable people ==
- Andrés Pedreño (1910–1988): He was a poet of a traditional south-east Spanish type of poetry which consists in improvisation of dialogued poetry with the accompaniment of folklore music named trovo. Unlike the usual in this kind of poetry compositions, his works lacked guileless, but spirituality was present in his poems.
- Melchor Amate Hernández (1900–1983): Corporal in the Spain army. He received the Laureate Cross of Saint Ferdinand, the highest Spanish military decoration for gallantry because of an heroic act he done in 1924 in the context of Rif War.
- Aniceto Rosique Nieto (1960)
- Flora Osete (1883–?), Spanish lexicographer, translator, and writer, co-author of the Gran diccionario de la lengua castellana (Great Dictionary of the Spanish Language)

== See also ==
- List of municipalities in the Region of Murcia
