= Las Palas =

Village in Murcia, Spain

Las Palas (37°39′N 1°09′W) is a village, situated in the autonomous region of Murcia in South East Spain. The name Las Palas is derived from the large amount of "Palas" (cactus) found in the area. The village has been in existence since the 16th Century. It is located 7 km south of Fuente Álamo de Murcia and 20 km north west of Cartagena.

There were scores of windmills in and around Las Palas used in the production of wheat flour, and the road from Las Palas to Fuente Álamo is known locally as the "Road of country windmills". The village consists of approximately 300 houses mainly inhabited by Spanish residents (95%) the remainder consisting of French and English immigrants. The main type of employment within the village and immediate area is agricultural. There are several shops within the village and the small church of San Pedro Apóstol (Saint Peter the Apostle).
