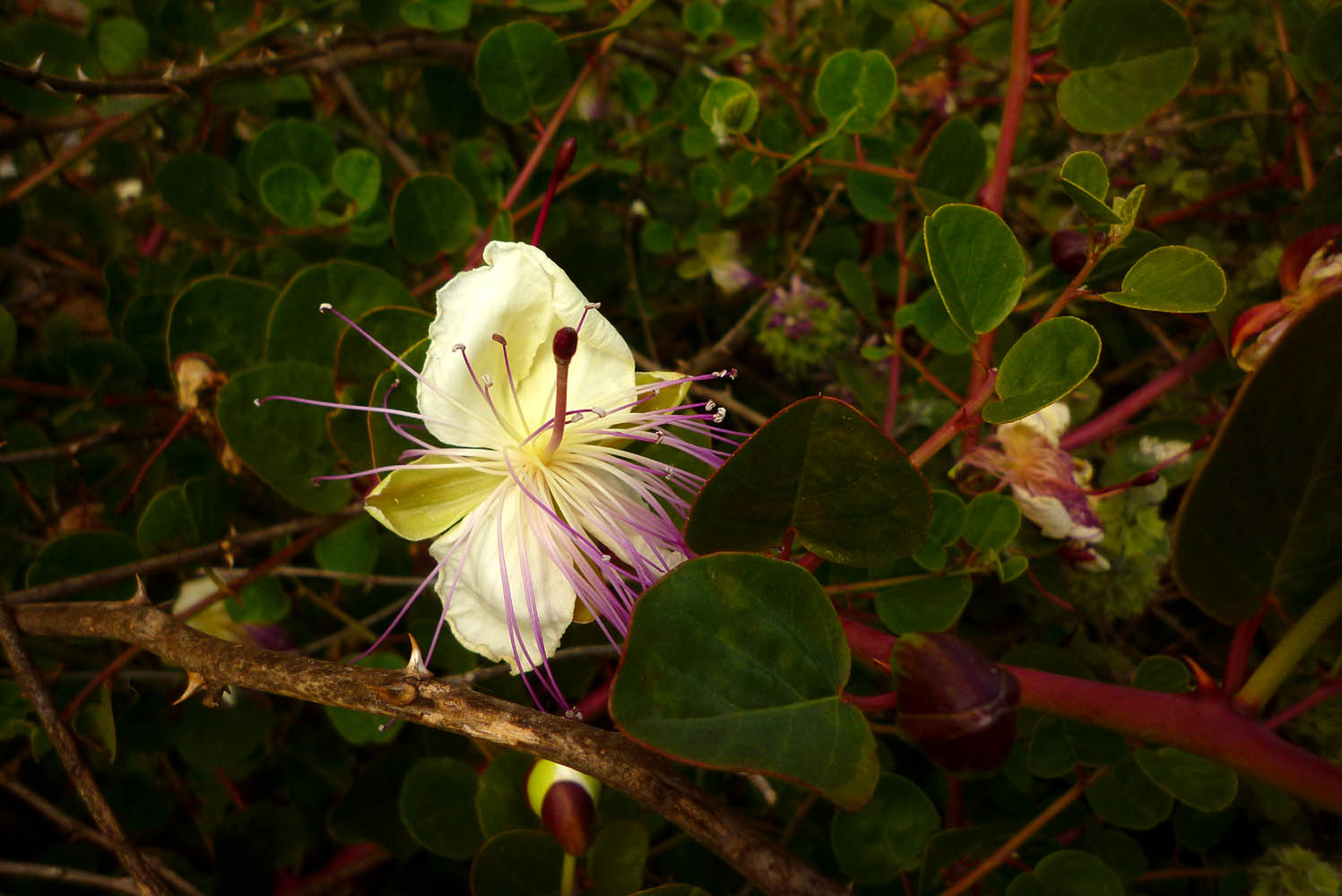
- On Sierra Minera de Cartagena-La Unión

Conservation status
- Endangered (IUCN 3.1)

Scientific classification
- Kingdom: Plantae
- Clade: Tracheophytes
- Clade: Angiosperms
- Clade: Eudicots
- Clade: Rosids
- Order: Brassicales
- Family: Capparaceae
- Genus: Capparis
- Species: C. zoharyi

Binomial name
- Capparis zoharyi Inocencio et al.

Synonyms
- Capparis spinosa var. aegyptia (Lam.) Boiss; Capparis aegyptia Lam.

= Capparis zoharyi =

Species of plant

Capparis zoharyi is a perennial, deciduous species of caper.

== Description ==
It differs from Capparis spinosa mainly because of its upright habit, reaching up to two meters in height. In spring it resprouts from the branches, not from the stock as does C. spinosa, so it ends up developing a trunk that can become quite thick.

Its leaves are rounded and scotate and its fruit is elongated with yellow pulp. It is often hybridized with C. spinosa.

It is a winter deciduous species. The first shoots appear in mid-March. It appears in bloom during the summer (mainly in June), and the first fruits appear in July. At the end of September it loses its leaves.

== Habitat and distribution ==
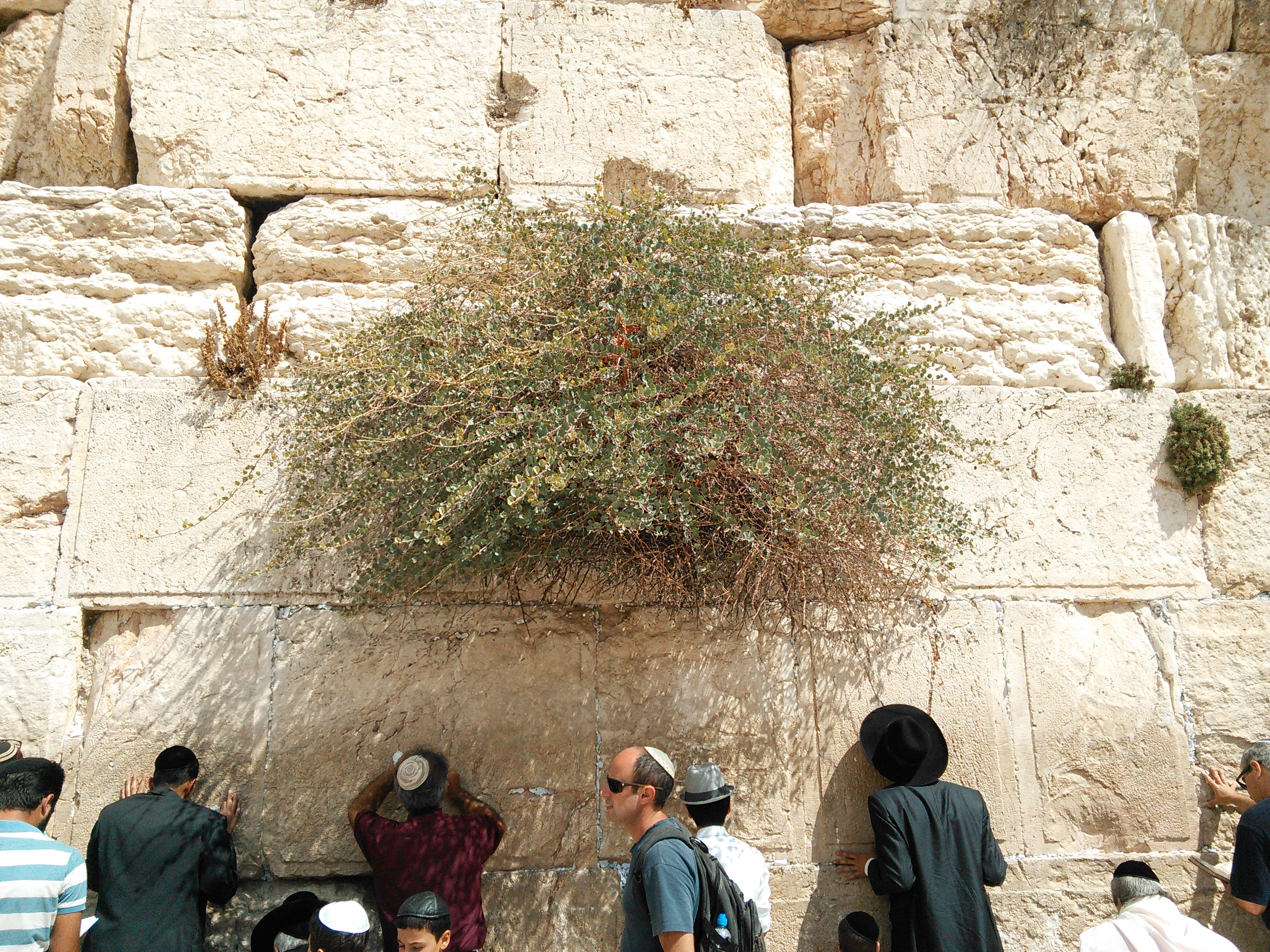
On the Wailing Wall in Jerusalem.

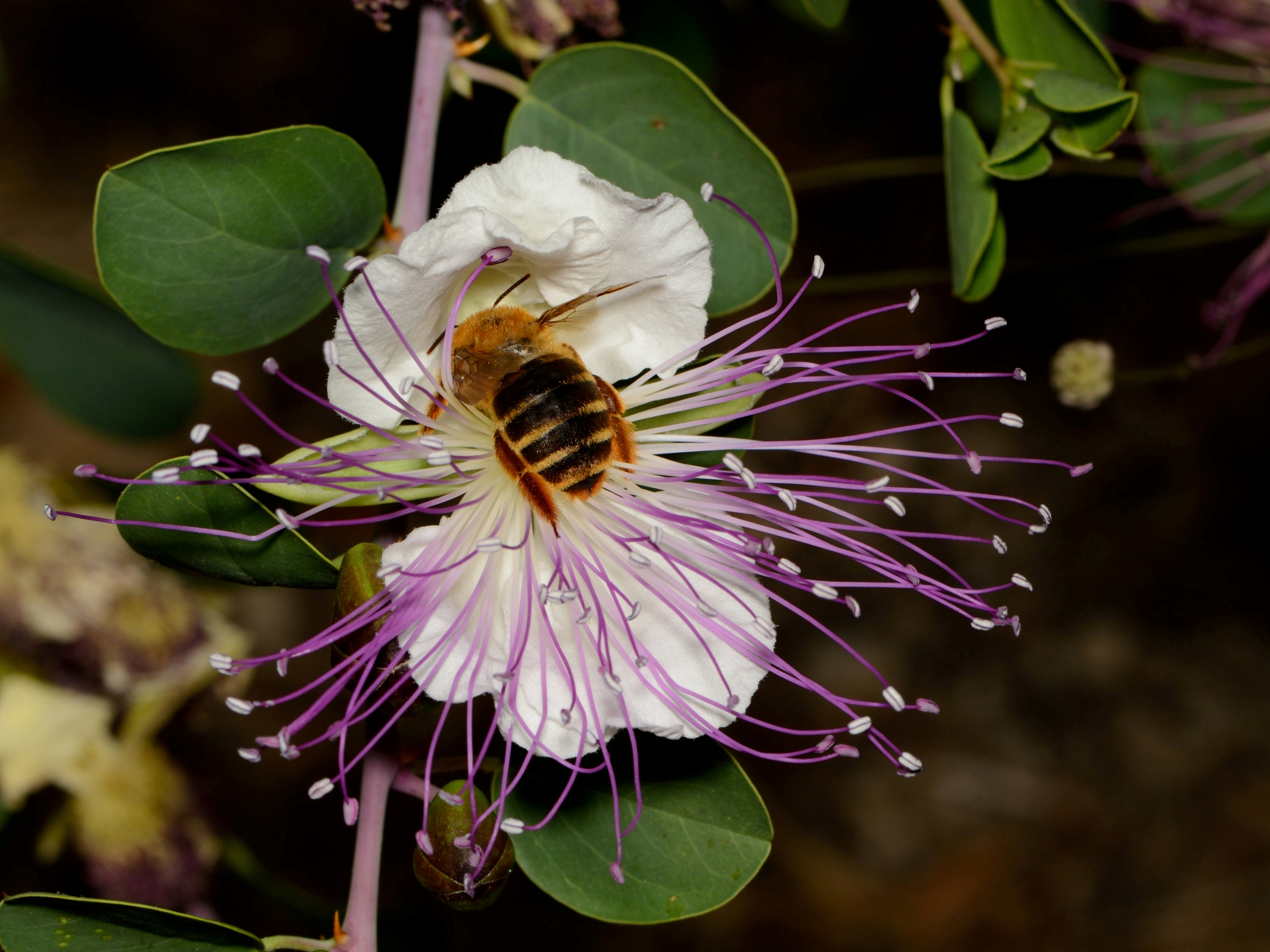
Detail of the flower.

This species grows on slopes, embankments, building walls and roadsides.

It is distributed occasionally in some areas of Spain, Morocco, Algeria, the Middle East, Turkey and the island of Crete.

In Spain the species is exclusive of the mountains of Cartagena, especially in the mining area of Cartagena-La Union, where it develops in the environment of abandoned mining facilities. It can also be found in the surroundings of the port of the city itself.

== Conservation status ==
In Spain it is listed as endangered according to the Red List of endangered vascular flora (2008). Globally the species is not evaluated (NE).

From the legal point of view, in Spain the species does not have any type of protection, although some of its populations are included within the regional park of Calblanque, Monte de las Cenizas and Peña del Águila, or are in the surroundings of protected mining buildings, such as the entire mining area, with the category of Bien de Interés Cultural (BIC).

== Taxonomy ==
Capparis zoharyi was described by Inocencio, D. Rivera, Obón & Alcaraz and published in Annals of the Missouri Botanical Garden 93: 145. 2006.

== See also ==
- Capparis
- Glossary of plant morphology
- History of botany
- Timeline of British botany
