= Mazarrón =

- Municipality
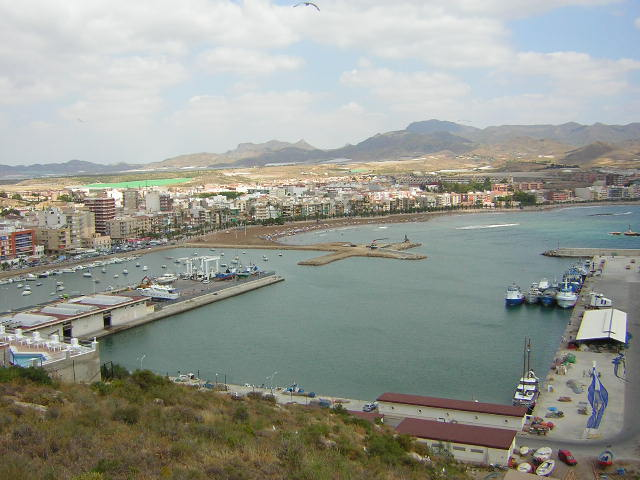
- Mazarrón port and beach

- Flag Coat of arms

- Location in Murcia

- Location in Region of Murcia Mazarrón (Spain)
- Coordinates: 37°35′54″N 1°18′50″W
- Country: Spain
- Autonomous Community: Region of Murcia
- Province: Region of Murcia
- Comarca: Bajo Guadalentín
- Own municipality: 1572

Government
  - Mayor: Ginés Campillo Méndez (UIDM)

Area
  - Total: 319 km^{2} (123 sq mi)
- Elevation (AMSL): 55 m (180 ft)

Population (2025-01-01)
  - Total: 35,449
  - Density: 111/km^{2} (288/sq mi)
- Time zone: UTC+1 (CET)
  - Summer (DST): UTC+2 (CEST (GMT +2))
- Postal code: 30870
- Area code: +34 (Spain) + 968 (Murcia)
- Website: Official website

Mazarrón is a municipality in Murcia, south-east Spain. It is on the coast of the Mediterranean Sea and has an area of 318.7 square kilometres (123.1 mi^{2}). It had a population of 31,562 in 2019.

The Bay of Mazarrón is sheltered by the foothills of the Sierra de la Almenara, a mining area since the Carthaginian era. The Bay has over 35 km of beaches, unspoiled coves and rocky sea beds. The beach at Bolnuevo is of coarse grit, as are most beaches along this part of the coast.

A military fortification built in the 1930s is a tourist attraction, and is located on the old road between Mazarrón and Cartagena, just outside the municipality.

The 'Torre de los Caballos' tower was built to defend the town from pirate raids that occurred from the mid-16th to the early 18th centuries.

The economic development of the early 20th century led to the construction of buildings in the style known as Murcian Modernism, including the Mazarrón Town Hall and the former Cultural Athenaeum.

== Geography - Physical & Human ==
=== Physical geography ===
Mazarrón is in the south of the Region of Murcia. It borders on Cartagena and Fuente Álamo to the east, Alhama de Murcia and Totana to the north. Lorca to the west and the Mediterranean Sea to the south.

The main landform of the municipality is a mountain range named Sierra de Las Moreras, which is located in the west. In regards to waterbeds, there is not any river, but there are several arroyos (creeks) or ramblas and a remarkable one is Rambla de Las Moreras. There is also a group of three ponds named Lagunas de Las Moreras.

=== Human geography ===
This municipality has 13 towns and villages. These are Mazarrón which is in the southern half and is inhabited by 12,478 people; Puerto de Mazarrón, located in the south and home to 10,253 people; Saladillo, in the northern half and with a population of 3,086; Ifre-Cañada de Gallego, located in the southeast and occupied by 1,194 people; Balsicas, in the east, is home to 1,174 people; Moreras (where Bolnuevo is included), is in the southern half and is inhabited by 1,034 people; Garrobo, in the northern half, has a population of 475; Leiva, in the southwestern quarter, is home to 306 people; Majada in the east is inhabited by 200 people; Ifre-Pastrana, located in the southwest and inhabited by 456 people; Gañuelas, in the northwest, has a population of 75; Rincones is located in the eastern half and is home to 27 people, and Mingrano in the east, which is occupied by 23 residents.

== History ==
=== Prehistory ===
The most ancient data which are known about the territory corresponding to the current municipality date from the Middle and Upper Paleolithic. There are some archaeological sites such one which is placed in Permera Cave, other which is located in Los Tollos ravine, one which is named La Peñica and another one whose name is Las Palomas. The two last ones are placed in the hillock Cabezo del Faro.

The remains of these spots consist of material related to manufactured tools such as flint spear tips, scrapers, racloirs and hammerstones. There were also another ones related to ritual burials. As glaciations ended, prehistory communities organizations were developing.

When the sedentism appeared, some material such as ceramic and some structures such as the first megalithic burial sites in Palomarico Cave and Caballo Cave emerged.

In regards to Chalcolithic and Bronze Age in this current municipality, a prehistoric hamlet in a local range named Sierra de las Moreras can be mentioned. A cemetery is located in this ancient locality, but nowadays the only remains of this necropolis consist of a circle-shaped megalithic tumulus.

There are also other sites related to these eras such as Ifre, La Ciñuela, one of which is placed in a hillock named Cabezo Negro and another one which is located in a beach whose name is Playas de Calnegre. These ones have argaric origins.

In regards to Iron Age, the presence of Phoenicians in this territory was meaningful. Two Phoenician vessels were discovered in the beaches of Mazarrón. This fact led Mazarrón to be an appealing point related to underwater archaeology.

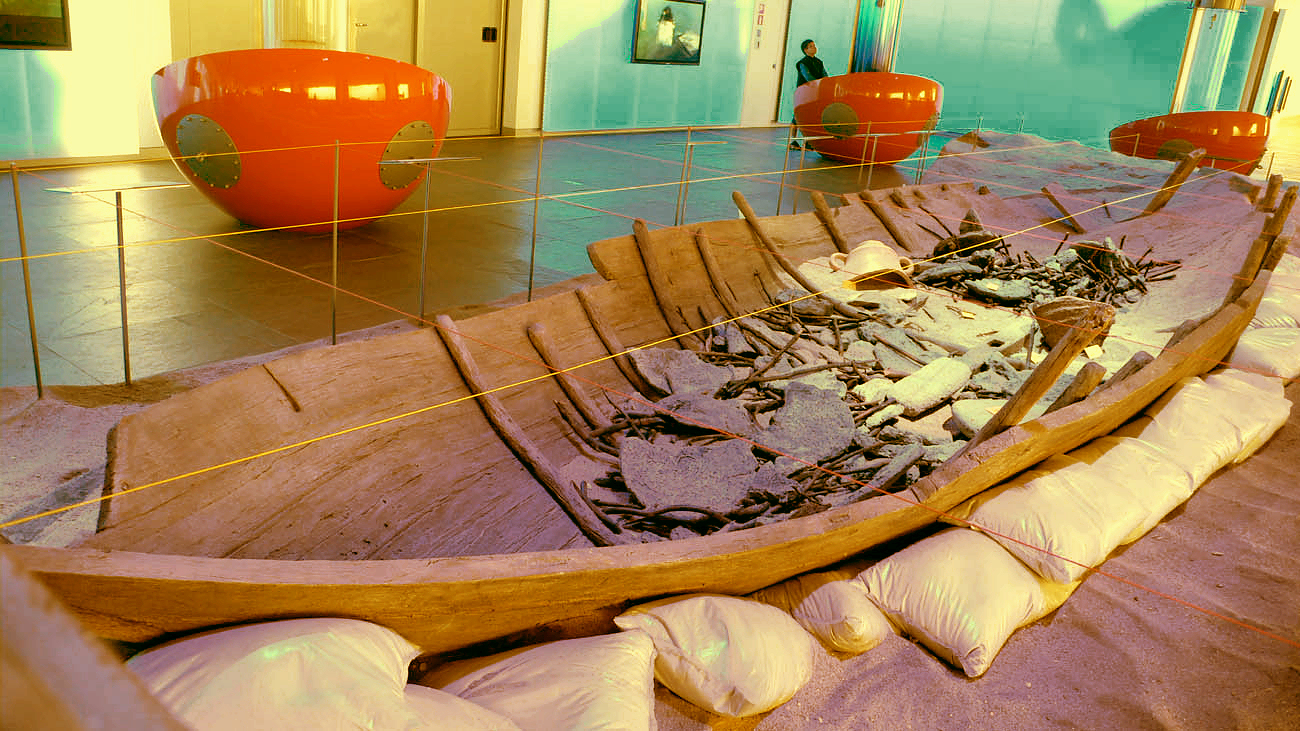
Replica of the remains of a Phoenician boat that was found in Mazarrón.

The main activities of this civilization in this territory were the ones related to mining. In this lands these people realized the broad possibilities, especially fishing and plumber mining. The abundance of this mineral has been constant during the history of this current municipality and the mineral was a main resource in the mining activities in Mazarrón.

Phoenicians were who introduced in plumber in this area, but they did not build lengthy settlements. A noteworthy fact of this civilization is the advance in shipbuilding.

During this period there was also Hellenic presence, but their influence in Mazarrón lower than the Phoenician one. Nevertheless, they also set trading routes which affected this village.

Some centuries after the Phoenicians and Greeks, there was an Iberian presence in this area, but this occupancy left few traces.

=== Ancient history ===
From 209 BC when the Second Punic War was being fought between Rome and Carthage, Romans conquered Qart-Hadast the current city of Cartagena which bought a large part of the Iberian Peninsula under Roman control including the area of Mazarrón, settling a town they called Ficaria.

Mining was very important in the Roman era in the Mazarrón area and there are archaeological remnants of the Roman presence. A noteworthy archaeological site related to Romans is the Villa del Alamillo. There are also remains of marble statues of the Roman goddess Ceres.

The Romans also built facilities to producing the common Roman sauce garum which consisted of fermented fish entrails (particularly mackerell). They also produced a fish salting factory, the remains of which have been developed into a museum.

=== Middle Ages and Early modern period ===
In the year 711 AD there was a Muslim conquer of great part of the Iberian Peninsula, in particular it was carried out by an Islamic Berber conquering party. Consequently, Mazarrón became part of Al-Andalus, the territory in the Iberian Peninsula under Muslim government and control and also a province of the Umayyad Caliphate.

Due to the Reconquista, the territory became quite uninhabited. In that period Mazarrón was part of the conciliium (a governmental institution of that era) of Lorca. An important construction of this era period is the Vélez Castle.

On 1 August 1572 the king Philip II of Spain conceded Mazarrón the status of villa (a status of localities in that era). Since that fact, an own towncouncil was avoidable for Mazarrón and its period as a municipality (which remains nowadays) started.

Mining activities, as traditionally, was an economy activity in that period and as a consequence an economic rise took occurred.

In that period, besides the economic rise, there was also insecurity in the territory due to pirate entrances and attacks. As a consequence, some towers were built in the municipality.

From 18th century fishing became moderately important and in previous periods this fishing importance did not exist. This significance endures nowadays. The Crown and other institutions began to promote this activity. Other economic activity which began to be done in this century is the alum transportation.

As a result of those economic activities a need of building dwellings on the coast rose. However, there wasn't a weighty town in that area before the 19th century.

=== Late modern period and Contemporary era ===
In the 19th century, mining continued being an activity an it underwent a boom. This mining rush underwent its peak in the 1840s and mining extraction was favoured by the law. This apogee in mining led to a progress in the environment, many investments, a lot of immigration, electric streetlight, railways, important buildings, miner hospital, etc.

The municipality got into a decline due to the depletion of mining resources in the early 20th century. The decaying situation in which there were even famine spells, was very connected to the political and social situation of the whole country.

The crisis of the municipality has some symptoms such as the decrement of the number of inhabitants - In the year 1900, 23,284 people were living there and 63 years after the number of inhabitants was 17,630. During those years, people in the village just tried to survive and foreign capital stop being invested in Mazarrón. This last fact emphasized the crisis.

Mazarrón began to leave the situation of recession because the economic activity was addressed to other areas and they would bring this territory its current characteristics. During the 20th century the society changed the economic activities from mining to agriculture, construction and tourism.

== Demographics ==
36.98% of the inhabitants are foreigners - 11.29% from other countries of Europe, 12.94% are Africans, 4.27% are Americans and 167 Asian people reside there. The table below shows the population trends during the 20th and 21st centuries by the beginning of their decades.

	1900	1910	1920	1930	1940	1950	1960	1970	1981	1991	2001	2011
Population	23,362	22,878	18,206	14,120	11,928	9,501	9,998	9,191	10,270	14,591	20,841	34,442

== Economic Growth ==
The municipality's main primary sector activities are agriculture and fishing. 21.9% of the territory is used for crops. The most grown products are tomatoes and cucumbers. Greenhouses are quite frequent. The main sea species are sardines and prawns. Due to tourism in Mazarrón, the service sector has a high weight in the territory. In 2013, 44.97% of the agreements corresponded to agricultural sector and 52.39% of the workers were labourers. In regards to the service area, 51.05% of the agreements were present, and 15.18% were corresponding to serving jobs.

== Government ==
As generally in Spain, the governors of Mazarrón are elected indirectly from the votes for political parties that take place in the municipality and autonomous community elections day every four years. The governors compose the pleno (a government body), which has 21 members in Mazarrón. The alcalde (head governor in a municipality) of Mazarrón elects 7 members from the pleno in order to form the junta de gobierno. The alcalde and three members else belong to PSOE (Partido Socialista Obrero Español) party and three members belong to UIDM (Unión Independiente de Mazarrón) party. Besides the governors in the junta de gobierno, seven partisans of Partido Popular, two partisans of Ciudadanos and one partisan of Vox are members of the pleno.

Governing party
2007–2011	Partido Popular
2011–2015	UIDM and PSOE (successively)
2015–2019	Partido Popular
2019–2023	Partido Socialista Obrero Español

== Transportation ==
The N-332 road connects Valencia and Vera, traversing the south of the municipality. The public A7 highways and private AP-7 motorway cross the municipality and can be seen near the main town.

There are bus services to Murcia, Cartagena, Alhama de Murcia and Totana from Mazarrón and Puerto de Mazarrón.

== Healthcare Facilities ==
Mazarrón is included in the Health area II, which main place is Cartagena. In this area there are two subareas related to the municipality: Mazarrón and Puerto de Mazarrón. There is a consultorio (primary care health centre with fewer functions and less specialised than the centros de salud) in Camposol and another in La Majada. A centro de salud (primary care health centre) can be found in Mazarrón and another in Puerto de Mazarrón.

== Education ==
Mazarrón has four primary and pre-primary education centres and two secondary schools. Puerto de Mazarrón has three early childhood and primary education centres and one secondary school. Two early childhood and primary education centres are located in other parts of the municipality.

5 degrees of basic vocational education, 2 degrees of medium level vocational education and 1 degree of higher vocational education are taught in the territory. A centre for adult education (CEA) can also be found in the main town.

There is an organisation of the towncouncil named Universidad Popular, in which several courses are taught. Two centres of a national public organisation about language teaching, which name is Escuela oficial de idiomas, can be found in the municipality - one of them is in Mazarrón and another is in Puerto de Mazarrón.

== Main sights & Tourist Attractions ==
There are some of the notable sites in Mazarrón owing to their historic, artistic and cultural values.

- Cabezo del Plomo Site: This is an archaeological site group and it is placed in a long-shaped mound. The origins of these remains are dated in the late Neolithic and in the Chalcolithic. On the top of the mound, a rampart and some circle shaped huts have been preserved. On the bottom of this rise, there are remains of a burial site with a tholos distribution.
- Punta de los Gavilanes Site: The promontory Punta de los Gavilanes was occupied from Prehistoric times to Roman times. The main presence in Punta de los Gavilanes occurred during the first centuries in the 2nd millennium BC. Argaric people were who stayed at this place in the first era. Some centuries after there was Phoenician presence in this peninsular islet and they used it as a trade settlement.
- Phoenician Vessel Interpretation Centre: In the vicinity of a beach named Playa de la Isla the two most ancient Phoenician vessels in the Mediterranean Sea were found. One of these boats has received the name Mazarrón I and the only elements which have been kept are its keel, some timbers and some strakes. There is another boat whose name is Mazarrón II and it is almost entire.
- Alamillo Villa: This archaeologic site group consists of an establishment, a water pond, remains of an aqueduct and remains of a villa. On one hand, there a part of this archaeological material is dated in the 2nd - 1st centuries BD (the establishment) and on the other hand there is material of the Roman Empire period (the villa, the pond, and the aqueduct).
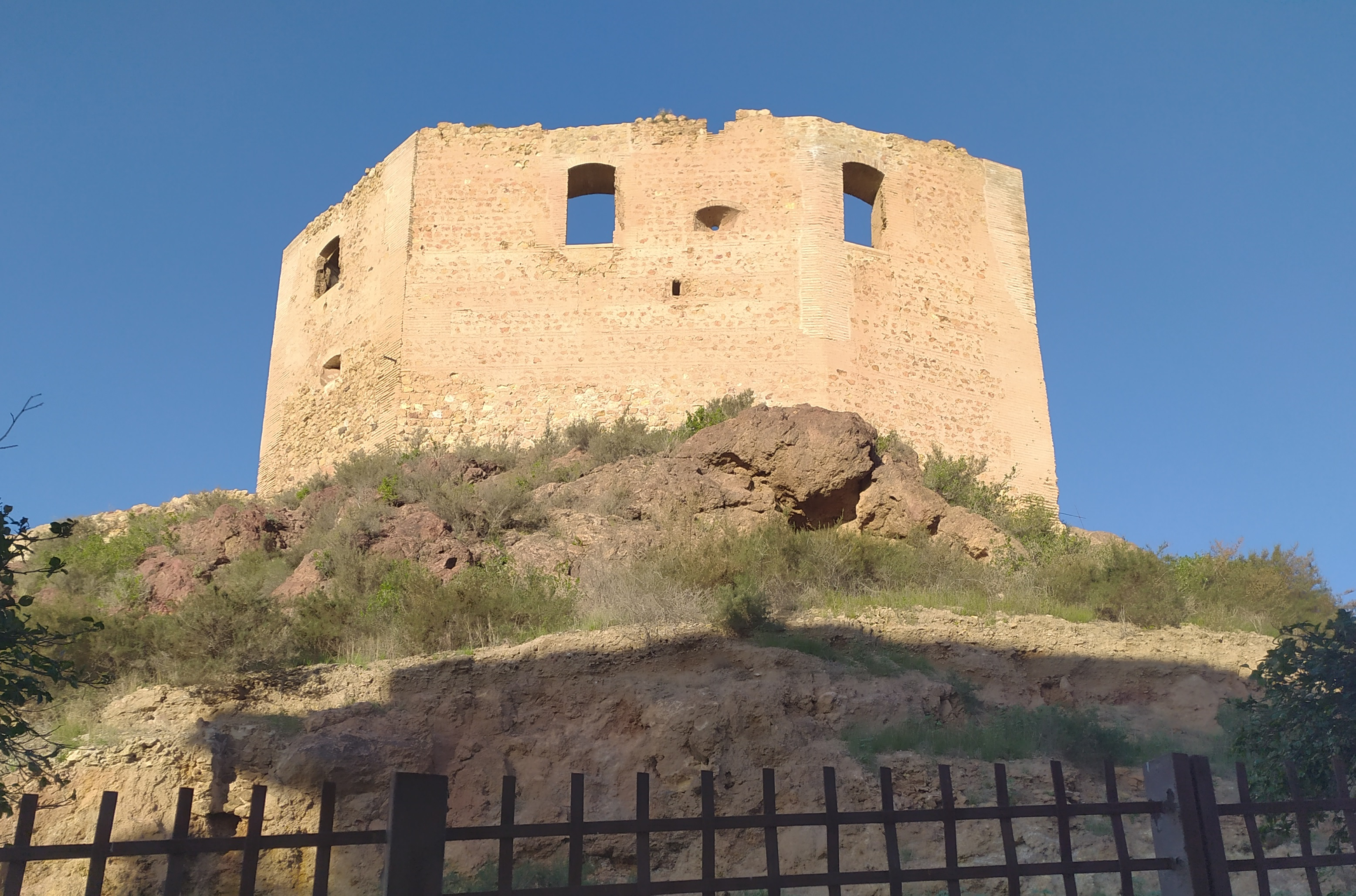
- Vélez Castle.
  Roman miliarium: A miliarium is a medium-heighted and oval or parallelepiped shaped column that was placed in the edge of the Roman roads for signalling every one thousand of passus (Roman measurement unit). This one is placed in the town Puerto de Mazarrón.
- De la Calle Era Roman Domus: This former house has been dated in the 4th and 5th centuries AD. It was a single-family dwelling whose surface was 300 m2. It had a central courtyard and triclinium.
- Roman Salting Factory: This structure was probably made and used in the 4th and 5th centuries AD.
- Vélez Castle: This fortress is located in the town centre of Mazarrón on a hillock.
- Molinete Tower: This structure also has the name Reyes Católicos Tower (Torre de los Reyes Católicos). This is a circle-shaped lookout fortified tower which is placed on a hummock close Vélez Castle. It was built in the year 1490.
- Santa Isabel Tower: This building was built in the 16th century. On one hand a reason for its settlement were the insecurity in this territory owing to Berber pirate entrances and attacks. On the other hand, this tower also enabled and facilitated fishing and agriculture activities. This tower is located on a hummock in Puerto de Mazarrón. It is circle shaped in its bottom part and its body is slightly truncated circular.
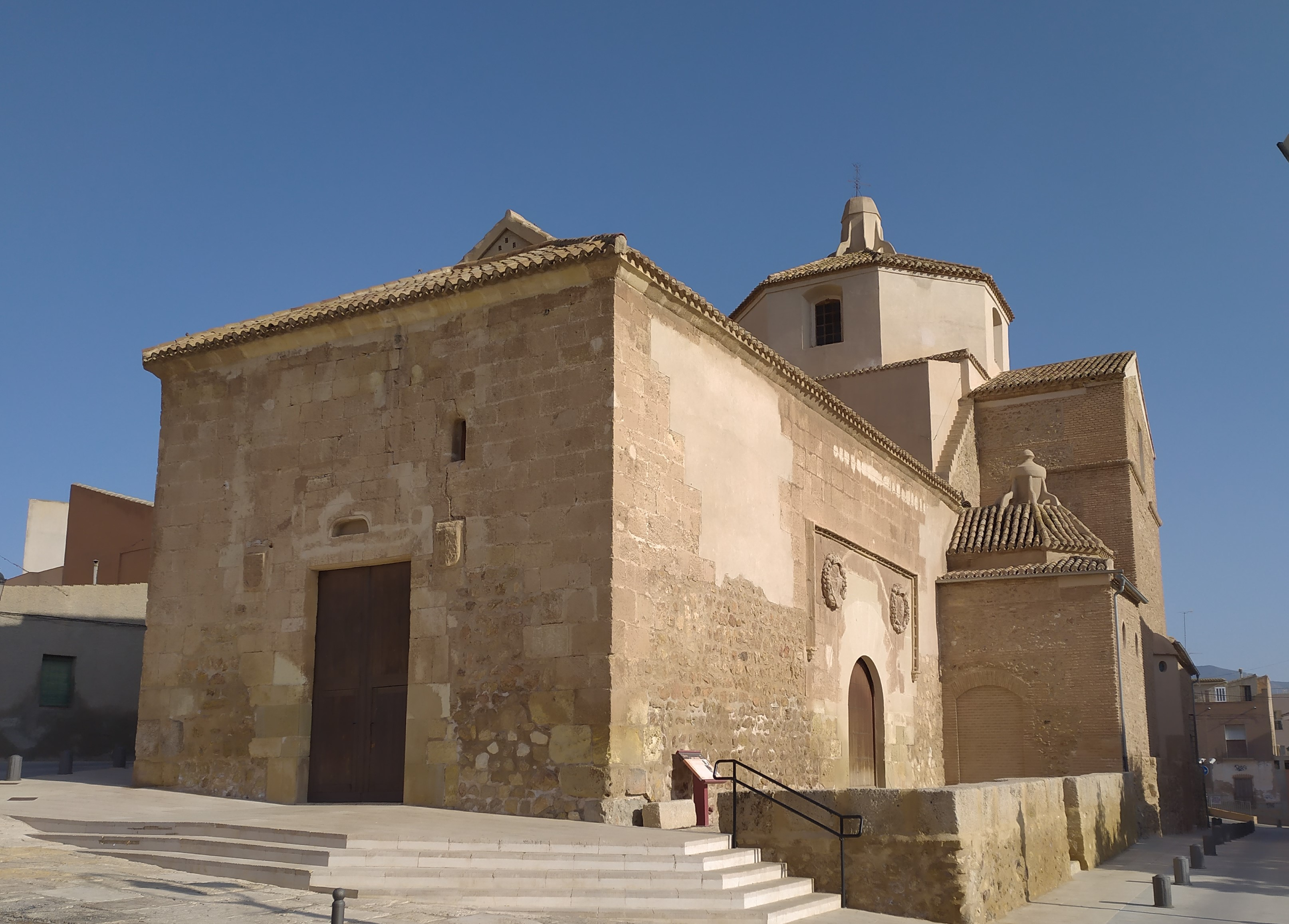
  San Andrés Church
- San Andrés Church: This edifice was built from 1523 to 1549, but it was remodeled in the 18th century. Its architectural style is baroc, but this church has mudéjar frames.
- San Antonio de Padua Church: This church is located in the foot of the hummock where Vélez Castle is built. The building was ordered to be built by the Vélez marquis (Marqués de los Vélez) and it was finished in last 50 years of the 16th century.
- De la Purísima Monastery-Church: It was built in the 18th century and is built in the place of a former kind of shrink typical in Spain known as ermita. The origin of its dedication consists in a religious miraculous legend named El Milagro de la Purísima de Bolnuevo.
- Ancient Alum Factory
- Mining properties of Mazarrón
- Del Arco Aqueduct: Its building date is unknown, but this aqueduct is supposed to be constructed in the 18th or 19th century.
- Ateneo Cultural: Any document about the date of its construction has not been found, but it is known that it had been already built in the year 1844.
- Towncouncil ancient building: This edifice was constructed in the last decade of the 19th century and has a modernist architectural style.
- Water supply entrance in Las Salinas: This architectural structure is related to the salting activities. This building was constructed in the 20th century.
- Sagrado Corazón de Jesús Sculpture: The creation of this statue was ended in the year 1924 and this sculpture was opened on May. It was crumbled during the Spanish Civil War (1936 - 1939) and restored in 1952.

== Sports ==
Mazarrón Fútbol Club plays association football in the fourth to sixth tiers of the Spanish football league system.

The town has other sport teams including Club Deportivo Mazarrón Basket (basketball), Club Deportivo Mazarrón Futbol Sala (futsal) and Club Deportivo Mazarrón tenis de mesa (table tennis).

Sport facilities include the Sport Municipality Pavilion, the La Cañadica Municipality Pavilion, Mazarrón Municipality Sports Centre, padel courts and soccer pitch at Ginés García school, Pedro Méndez Méndez Stadium, Manuela Romero Pavilion and Playasol de Puerto de Mazarrón Stadium in Puerto de Mazarrón.

== Festivities ==
=== Purísima Concepción festivity ===
This festivity is held from 4 to 8 December. It is a patron saint festivity, which is consecrated to the Virgin Mary in regards to her Immaculate Conception. This tradition has its origins in the 18th century.

During these days there are groups of people who get together specifically throughout the festivities and do activities related to the celebration (the Spanish concept of 'peña'). They prepare the events that will take place during these festive days and issues related to that such as the floats of the parades.

Besides the parade, there are other activities such as the election of the queen (a tradition in Spanish traditional festivities is choosing a female child or a young girl who will have the symbolic role of queen during the festivities), popular games, performances from locals, graffiti exhibitions, and some popular contests such as boules contest, pet contests, tennis competitions, soccer competitions, regattas, athletics contests, etc.

=== Festivities in the localities of Mazarrón ===
- El Saladillo Festivity: This festivity is held on 19 March and it is consecrated to Saint Joseph. In this festivity people in the hamlet do the festive pilgrim called in Spain romería . Some people eat in the country roast and get together next to the patron saint statue.
- Cañada de lo Gallego Festivity: Its festive days are consecrated to Saint Anthony of Padua. During this festivity there is a special mass and a religious parade in which people carry the patron saint statue.
- La Atalaya Festivity: These festive days are consecrated to Corpus Christi. Some activities of this festivity are a mass related to the Virgin of El Rocío, soccer competitions, contests, giant paella tasting acts, etc. Cañadas del Romero Festivity: This festivity is held on 24 June and it is consecrated to John the Apostole. During this festivity there are some activities such as religious parades in which people carry the patron saint statue, a special mass, verbenas, contests, etc.
- Leiva Festivity: This festivity takes place on 16 July. During the festive days there are displays and exhibitions which are arranged by the locals.
- Pastrana Festivity: This festive day takes place on 25 July and it is consecrated to James, son of Zebedee. There are some activities that are carried out by the locals during this spell such as one named 'carrera de cinta a caballo'(horse-drove and sash-wearing races) which consists (as the name indicates) in a horse-drove race in which the horsemen wear a sash and the winner gets a kiss from some lasses who play the role of ladies. People also do calva competitions, soccer matches, etc. Some performances of several kinds also take place during this day.
- Gañuelas Festivity: Its festive day takes place on 24 August and it is consecrated to the hamlet patron saint Bartholomew the Apostole. Some activities during the festivities are verbenas, customary dance performances, fireworks performances, etc.
- Majadas Festivity Despite this celebration is consecrated to Virgin Mary in her catholic facet as immaculate, the date of the festivity takes place on the first week on September instead of its standard corresponding day on 8 December. Some activities which are carried out during these days are boules matches, soccer matches, contests of a typical Spanish dish named migas, etc. There are also music performances that also are interpreted at nights.
- Las Balsicas Festivity The celebration takes place on 28 December. This festivity is named among the local 'Los Rebuznos'. The reason for this name is that the main tradition during this day consists in people making a role and their name is 'rebuznadores'. In that role these people dress up in a specific way and emit the typical sound of donkeys - the bray, whose translation in Spanish is 'rebuzno'. Hence the role 'rebuznador' which can be translated as 'people who bray', 'bray people' or 'brayers'.

== Notable people ==
- Domingo Valdivieso (1830–1872), painter
- José Toral y Velázquez (1832–1904), Spanish Army general
- Francisco Gómez Jordana (1852–1918), soldier and politician
- Pedro Acosta (2004), motorcycle racer
- Julia Romera Yáñez (1916–1941), anarchist and anti-fascist activist

== See also ==
- List of municipalities in the Region of Murcia
