= María Cegarra Salcedo =

Spanish poet and chemistry expert

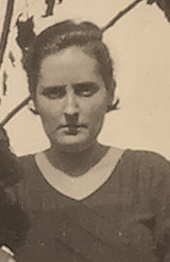
- Born: 28 November 1899; La Unión, Murcia, Spain
- Died: 26 March 1993 (aged 93); Murcia
- Education: University of Murcia
- Occupations: Chemist; teacher; poet; councillor

María Cegarra Salcedo (1899–1993) was a Spanish chemist, teacher, and poet. She was the first woman graduate in chemistry in Spain. In her later life, Cegarra was a councillor in her hometown, being the first female councillor of the La Unión Town Hall.

== Early life ==
María Cegarra Salcedo was born in La Unión, Murcia on 28 November 1899. Her father was a merchant and her mother a teacher of Andalusian origin. The literary precedent in her family was her brother Andrés Cegarra Salcedo, writer and creator of Editorial Levante (Levante publishing house).

== Career ==
=== Chemist ===
Between 1921 and 1924, Cegarra worked as a technical assistant in the industrial analysis laboratory of Francisco Munuera's widow, earning 200 pesetas a month. Cegarra obtained the title of Chemical Expert at the Escuela Politécnica Superior de Alcoy (EPSA) (Campus de Alcoy) on May 7, 1928. From the end of the 1920s and for several decades, she was in charge of her own chemical analysis laboratory, focused on mining, in the family home, located at: c/. Bailén n° 10. In 1946, Cegarra obtained a degree in Chemical Sciences from the University of Murcia. In addition, Cegarra taught for forty years in different educational centers in Cartagena, as well as in vocational training and high school centers, including the School of Industrial Experts.

=== Poet and playwright ===
After the death of her brother Andrés in 1928, she devoted herself to poetry, and in 1935, published her first poem, "Cristales míos"; it had a prologue by the writer Ernesto Giménez Caballero. Thanks to her brother, Andrés, Cegarra had met Carmen Conde, with whom she maintained a long and deep friendship recorded in a collection of letters. Cegarra participated in the activities carried out at the Universidad Popular de Cartagena that Conde and Antonio Oliver founded in that city. She also became friends with the journalist Raimundo de los Reyes and the poets Miguel Hernández and Ramón Sijé. She maintained a close relationship with Hernández.

She collaborated in one of the most prestigious magazines of the time, La Gaceta Literaria, directed by Giménez Caballero. Her work was also seen in the magazines La Región, La Verdad, Tránsito, Levante Agrario, Títiro Canta, Monteagudo, among others. She published her Poesía completa (Complete Poetry) in 1987, with an introduction by Santiago Delgado. After the death of her sister, Cegarra's last work, Poemas para un silencio, was published.

Together with Carmen Conde, Cegarra wrote the play Mineros (1932-1933) in which fiction is combined with autobiographical elements since it is inspired by the life of Cegarra and her family. It is also linked to the history of the labor movement in the mining district of La Unión.

=== Politics ===
Before the outbreak of the Spanish Civil War, Cegarra had not defined herself politically. Later, she joined the Sección Femenina. Cegarra entered politics as a councillor for the La Unión Town Hall in the 1960s, being the first female councillor of the La Unión Town Hall.

== Death and legacy ==
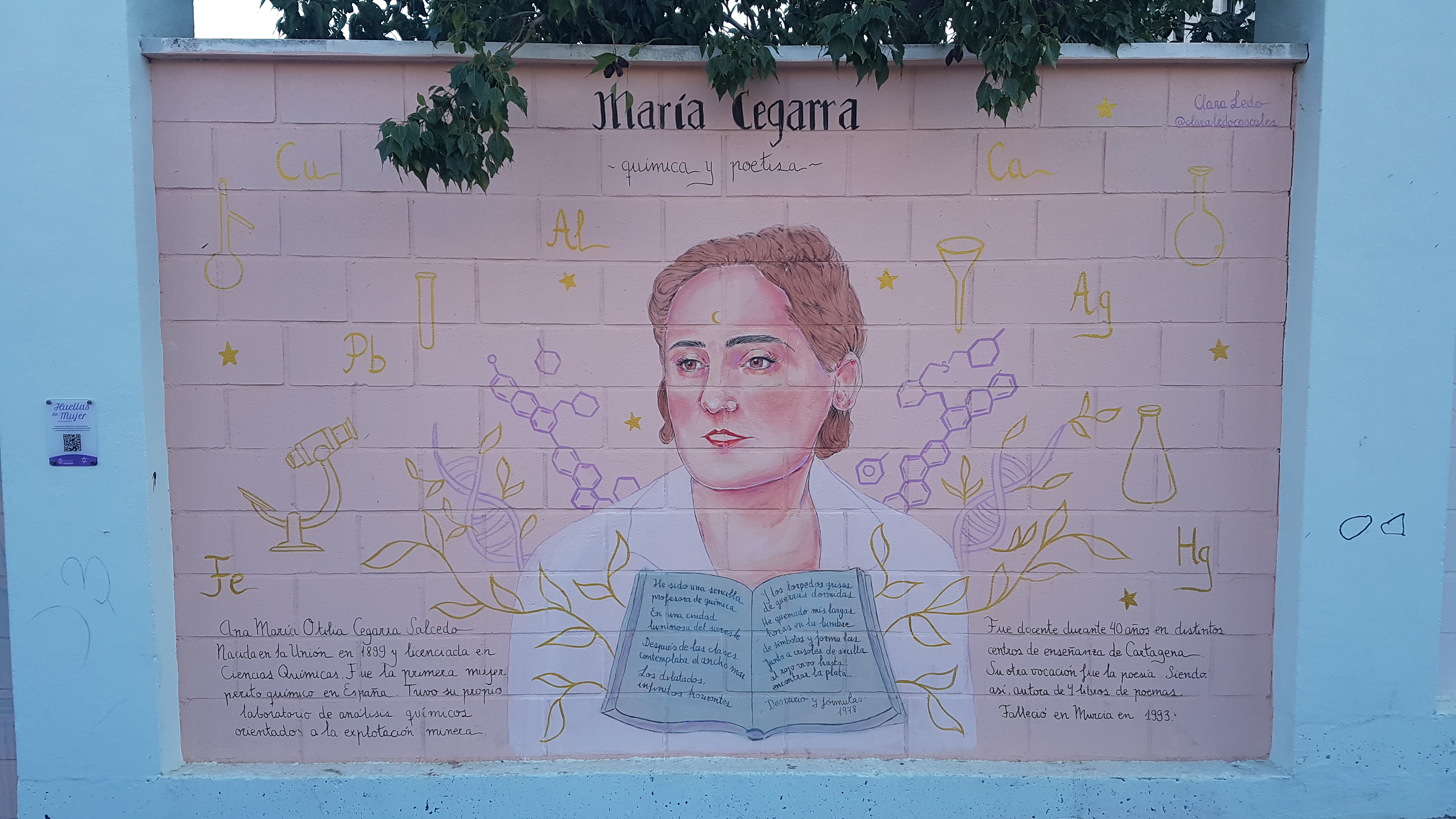
Mural of María Cegarra, by Clara Ledo (2021)

María Cegarra Salcedo died in Murcia on 26 March 1993.

In 1980, the María Cegarra Salcedo High School in La Unión was named in her honor. She was named the Favorite Daughter of La Unión in 1992. On the centenary of her birth (1999), the City Council of La Unión inaugurated a bust of Cegarra in front of the Liceo de Obreros, a center directed by her brother Andrés at the beginning of the 20th century.

== Selected works ==
- Mineros, 2018 (with Carmen Conde) ISBN 9788478397549
- Poemas para un silencio, 1999 ISBN 9788480181686
- Cada día conmigo, 1986
- Poesía completa, 1986 ISBN 978-84-505-5458-8
- Desvarío y fórmulas, 1978 ISBN 8440041780
- Cristales míos, 1935, ISBN 978-84-7839-729-7 OCLC 1061842121
