= Amanda Junquera Butler =

Spanish writer

- Conde (right) and Junquera (left) ,1940
- Born: 19 October 1898; Madrid, Spain
- Died: 27 December 1986 (aged 88); Madrid, Spain
- Other names: Isabel de Ambía, Amanda Junquera, Amanda Alcázar-Junquera
- Occupation: writer
- Years active: 1941–1961
- Spouse: Cayetano Alcázar Molina
- Partner: Carmen Conde Abellán

Amanda Junquera Butler (19 October 1898 – 27 December 1986) was a Spanish writer. Raised in Madrid, she attended university during the Spanish Civil War at the University of Valencia. Junquera was a noted translator, chronicler, and short story writer in the mid-20th century, whose works and impact received new interest in the 21st century with republishing of some of her works and scholarship on her life.

== Early life ==
Amanda Junquera Butler was born on 19 October 1898 in Madrid to Emilia Butler and Tomás Junquera de Basañez. She grew up in Madrid along with her five siblings, Isabel, María Luisa, Emilia, María Teresa, and Tomás. She enjoyed reading and from a young age, traveled widely and studied music and literature. In July 1928, at the Santa Bárbara Parish Church of Madrid, she married the academic and dean of the Faculty of Arts for the University of Murcia, Cayetano Alcázar Molina. Junquera continued traveling widely after her marriage, moving as was required for Alcázar's career.

== Career ==
In 1936, at a reception for the opening of the Universidad Popular de Cartagena in the Murcia Region of Spain, Junquera met the writer Carmen Conde Abellán, who had been active in getting the university established. Conde was the wife of poet, Antonio Oliver Belmás and would become the first woman admitted into the Royal Spanish Academy. The two women had an immediate affinity for each other and began exchanging books and letters. Within a month of their meeting, Conde was dedicating poems to Junquera, which explicitly described her desire for engaging with Amanda using all of her senses and alluding to Katherine Mansfield in language widely known as lesbian coding in the period. Just over a year after meeting, in June 1937, the two women planned a holiday together, without their husbands, at Penyal d'Ifac Natural Park in Valencia, where they became lovers.

During the Spanish Civil War (1936–1939) the women cemented their relationship, as their husbands were away and they were able to continue to meet and correspond. Because of Spanish law and social custom, the two women were not allowed to divorce or acknowledge their sexuality, which created the need to publicly hide their situation. Both husbands had volunteered to serve in the Spanish Republican Army and both served in Baza, Granada. Conde's husband, Oliver, was captured and imprisoned, while Junquera's husband, Alcázar, was transferred to the University of Valencia, and would become Director-General of Universities under Francisco Franco's dictatorship. Junquera enrolled in classes at the University of Valencia, when she returned from her holiday at Peñón de Ifach. Among her classmates were Josefina Escolano Sopena and Concha Zardoya.

At the end of the war, authorities marked Conde for arrest because she was a pro-Republican intellectual. Junquera helped her escape from Valencia and they moved into the home of Junquera's sister in Madrid. For a year, they lived with the sister, where Conde hid in a bedroom. In 1940, the women moved to San Lorenzo de El Escorial and then in 1942, Alcázar joined them in Madrid. He and Junquera rented #5 Calle Velintonia from poet, Vicente Aleixandre, which would be the home for the three of them off and on for the next four decades. It was in the early 1940s, that Junquera began to publish, using the pseudonym Isabel de Ambía. She wrote essays, chronicles, literary critiques, and short stories which were mainly published in magazines like Cuadernos de Literatura Contemporánea (Contemporary Literature Notes), Destino de Barcelona (Destiny Barcelona), El Español (The Spanish), and Hispania.

From 1942, Junquera translated literary works of English, French, and Italian writers into Spanish. These included works by Adriano Augusto Michieli, Marcel Pagnol, Anna Maria Speckel, Alejandro Tassoni Estense, and William Thomas Walsh, among others. Joaquín de Entrambasaguas praised her translations of Micheli and Tassoni in a 1944 review in Cuadernos de Literatura Contemporánea, and her translation of Walsh was republished in both 1953 and 1963. She also published stories throughout the 1940s. In 1947, Junquera published her only book, Un hueco en la luz (A Hollow in the Light).

When Oliver was finally released from prison, he and Conde agreed to remain married in name only. Oliver was required to live in isolation in Murcia, but Conde returned to El Escorial, where she could be with Junquera. When Conde was accused of political offenses, Junquera and Alcázar used their influence to help her get the charges dismissed. Suffering from a heart condition, Oliver was allowed to return to Madrid in 1945 and Conde ostensibly lived with him and his mother in a separate apartment. The two couples remained close, often vacationing together in spite of the complicated relationships. Junquera's husband died in 1958 and she and Conde remained constant companions. When Oliver died in 1968, Conde permanently moved into Junquera's home.

== Death and legacy ==
Junquera died on 27 December 1986 in Madrid and she was buried in the cemetery in Torrelodones. Though she was often overshadowed by their fame, both Conde and Alcázar dedicated multiple works to her in recognition of her significance in their own literary productions. Revived interest in her works began in the 21st century and her biography was included in volume 2 of the Indice Biográfico de España, Portugal e Iberoamérica (Biographical Indices of Spain, Portugal and Latin America, Walter de Gruyter, 2000). Several of her translations also were republished in 2000 and 2001. In 2007, José Luis Ferris published Carmen Conde: vida, pasión y verso de una escritora olvidada (Carmen Conde: Life, Passion and Verse of a Forgotten Writer), which chronicled the relationship of Conde and Junquera publicly.

== Selected works ==
=== Stories ===
- de Ambía, Isabel (1943). "El espejo a lo largo del camino y Un ahogado en el Sena" [The Mirror along the Way and A Drowned Man in the Seine]. El Español (in Spanish). 1 (17). Madrid: Impreso en "Afrodisio Aguado", S.A.: 7. ISSN 9949-3705.
- de Ambía, Isabel (1943). "En presencia de la primavera" [In the Presence of Spring]. El Español (in Spanish). 1 (26). Madrid: Impreso en "Afrodisio Aguado", S.A.: 7. ISSN 9949-3705.
- de Ambía, Isabel (1943). "Otoño en El Escorial y La casita de arriba, mansión destrozada de la música" [Autumn in El Escorial and The Little House Upstairs: a Mangled Mansion of Music]. El Español (in Spanish). 1 (56). Madrid: Impreso en "Afrodisio Aguado", S.A.: 16. ISSN 9949-3705.
- de Ambía, Isabel (1944). "En reclusión [In Seclusion]". In Romo, Josefina (ed.). Cuentistas españoles de hoy [Spanish Storytellers Today] (in Spanish). Madrid: Editorial Febo. pp. 29–36. OCLC 230699784.
- de Ambía, Isabel (1947). Un hueco en la luz [A Hole in the Light] (in Spanish). Madrid: Consejo Superior de Investigaciones Científicas. OCLC 3694325.
- de Ambía, Isabel (1949). "Bodas de plata" [Silver Weddings]. Ínsula (in Spanish) (42). Madrid: Artes Gráficas Benzal: 7. ISSN 0020-4536.
- de Ambía, Isabel (1952). "Por el sueño" [By the Dream]. Revista de literatura (in Spanish). 1 (1). Madrid: Consejo Superior Investigacion Cientificas: 107–113. ISSN 0034-849X.

=== Essays ===
- de Ambía, Isabel (1941). "El capitán Garcilaso de la Vega" [The Captain Garcilaso de la Vega]. Hispania (in Spanish) (4). Madrid: Consejo Superior de Investigaciones Científicas: 114–115. ISSN 0018-2141.
- de Ambía, Isabel; Behn, Irene (1942). "La obra de Concha Espina" [The Work of Concha Espina]. Cuadernos de Literatura Contemporánea (in Spanish) (1). Madrid: Instituto Antonio de Nebrija: 7–22. ISSN 0210-9158. OCLC 432377286.
- de Ambía, Isabel (1942). "Don Ramón del Valle Inclán en Roma" [Don Ramón del Valle Inclán in Rome]. Cuadernos de Literatura Contemporánea (in Spanish) (3–4). Madrid: Instituto Antonio de Nebrija: 151–154. ISSN 0210-9158.
- de Ambía, Isabel (1942). "Junto a Gabriel Miró" [Together with Gabriel Miró]. Cuadernos de Literatura Contemporánea (in Spanish) (5–6). Madrid: Instituto Antonio de Nebrija: 226–228. ISSN 0210-9158.
- de Ambía, Isabel (1946). "Magia en la vida y en la obra de don Ramón Maria del Valle Inclán" [Magic in the Life and Work of Don Ramón Maria del Valle Inclán]. Cuadernos de Literatura Contemporánea (in Spanish) (18). Madrid: Instituto Antonio de Nebrija: 479–484. ISSN 0210-9158. OCLC 65360914.
- de Ambía, Isabel (1946). "Homenaje a Gabriela Mistral [Homage to Gabriela Mistral]". Gabriela Mistral, Premio Nobel [Gabriela Mistral, Nobel Prize] (in Spanish). Madrid: Talleres de Blass. OCLC 561210598.

=== Translations ===
- Speckel, Anna Maria (1942). Mediterráneo báltico [Baltic Mediterranean] (in Spanish). Translated by de Ambía, Isabel. Madrid: Espasa-Calpe. OCLC 805689263.
- Tassoni Estense, Alejandro (1943). Eugenio de Saboya [Eugene of Savoy] (in Spanish). Translated by de Ambía, Isabel. Madrid: Espasa-Calpe. OCLC 807135238.
- Bo, Carlo; Alfaro, José María (forward) (1943). La poesía de Juan Ramón Jiménez [The Poetry of Juan Ramón Jiménez] (in Spanish). Translated by de Ambía, Isabel. Madrid: Editorial Hispánica. OCLC 914501340.
- Michieli, Adriano Augusto (1943). El Duque de los Abruzzos y sus empresas [The Duke of Abruzzos and his Companies] (in Spanish). Translated by de Ambía, Isabel. Madrid: Espasa-Calpe. OCLC 801971539.
- Walsh, William Thomas (1948). Personajes de la Inquisición [Characters of the Inquisition] (in Spanish). Translated by de Ambía, Isabel. Madrid: Espasa-Calpe. OCLC 752850134.
- Pagnol, Marcel (1963). La edad de los secretos [The Age of Secrets] (in Spanish). Translated by de Ambía, Isabel. Barcelona: Juventud. OCLC 433602554.
