= Portmán =

Human settlement in the Region of Murcia, Spain

Coordinates: 37°35′27″N 0°51′08″W

- Settlement
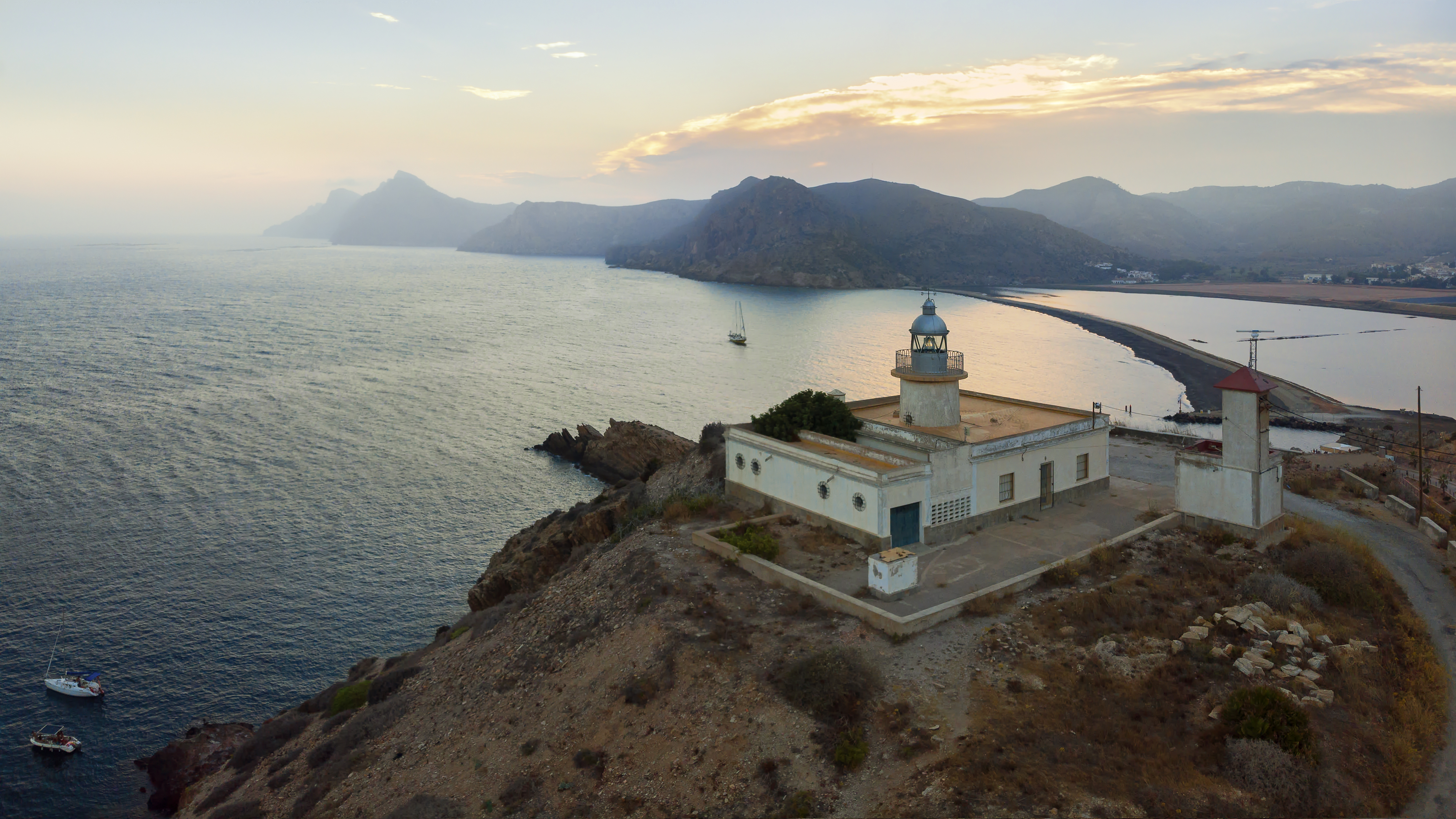

- Coat of arms

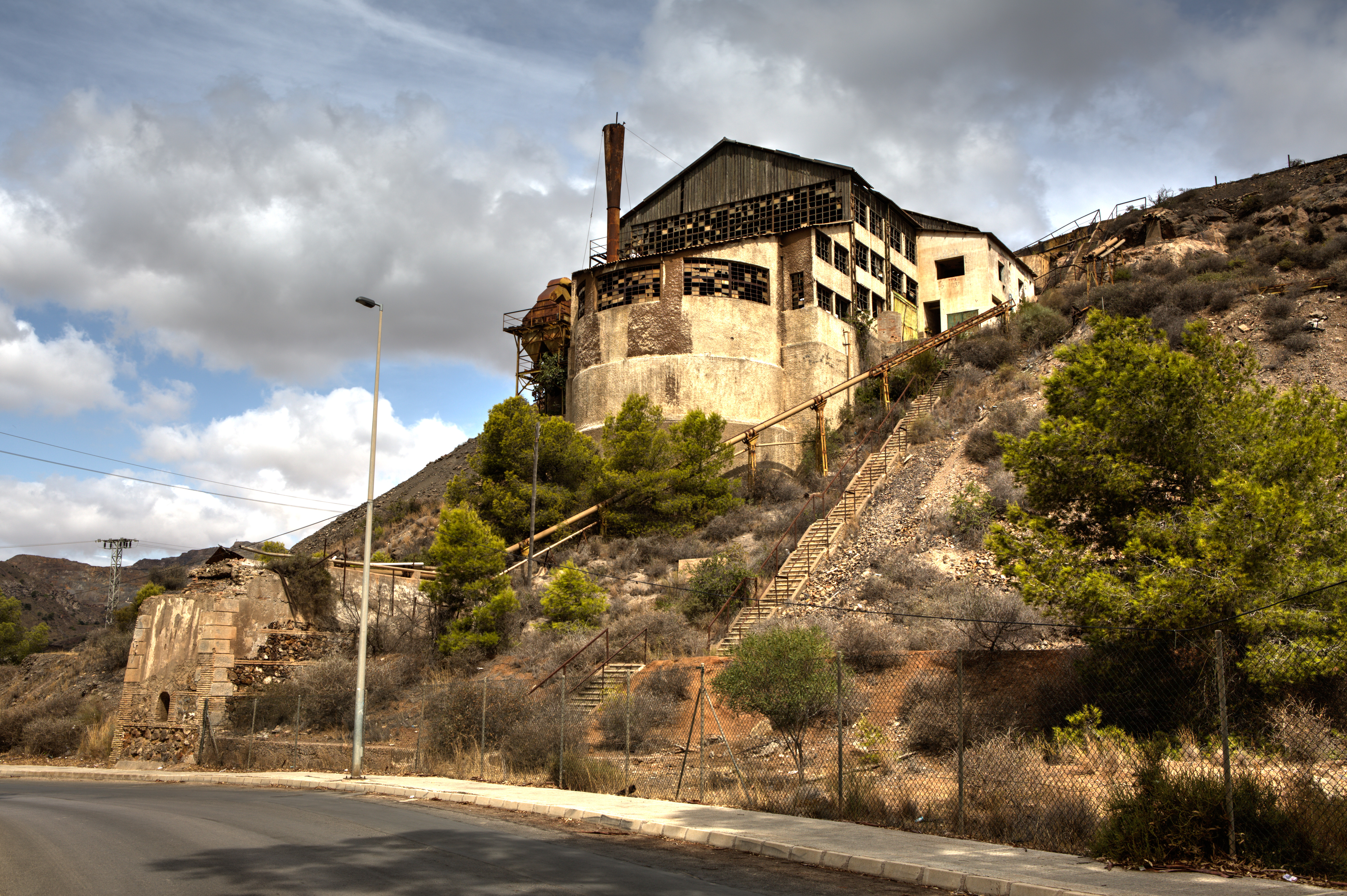
- Country: Spain
- Autonomous community: Region of Murcia
- Province: Murcia
- Comarca: Campo de Cartagena
- Judicial district: Cartagena
- Municipality: La Unión

Government
  - Mayor: Pedro López Milán (PSOE)

Population (2019, INE)
  - Total: 997
- Demonym(s): portmanera, -o
- Postal code: 30364
- Provincial code: 30
- Patron saint: James the Great

Portmán is a locality in the Region of Murcia, Spain, located to the south of the municipality of La Unión at the foot of the mining mountain range of Cartagena-La Unión in a bay bathed by the Mediterranean Sea.

Its territory has a very rugged topography, surrounded by mountains that surround the coastal plain, where the population center is located. To the north is the Sancti Spiritu hill, 434 meters high, which is the highest point of the entity, with Fortuna hill further south and the Cabezo de las Lajas, 283 meters above sea level. To the west are located the cabezo of El Pino (271 m above sea level) and the cabezo of La Galera (177 m above sea level), whose slopes plunge towards the Mediterranean Sea; to the east are the Peña del Águila (387 m above sea level) and the Monte de las Cenizas (307 m above sea level), integrated in the regional park of Calblanque, Monte de las Cenizas and Peña del Águila. About 3 kilometers from the town, on a promontory to the east of the Portmán inlet, stands the lighthouse of the same name.

== Toponymy ==
It was founded by the Romans in the first century, with the name of Portus Magnus (Large Port), origin of its current toponymy.

In Arab times it was called Burtuman Al-Kabir (Burtuman the Great).

Later, in the 14th century, in the hunting book of Alfonso XI of Castile it appears as Porte Mayn.

"In the land of Cartagena there are these mountains (...) The Sierra de Porte Mayn is a good pork mountain in winter, and in these mountains there are these springs, the Fuente del Cañaveral, the Fuente del Porte Mayn. The mountain of Cabo de Palos is a very good mountain for pork in winter, and this mountain is near the sea. And near this mountain is an island, which enters the sea: and it is well over a league long, and there are many deer on it". Book of the hunting of Alfonso XI of Castile. 14th century.

The first reference to the current name appears in a book of Cabildos of the City Council of Cartagena in 1590.

It shares the origin of its etymology with the municipality of San Antonio Abad (in Catalan: Sant Antoni de Portmany) on the island of Ibiza.

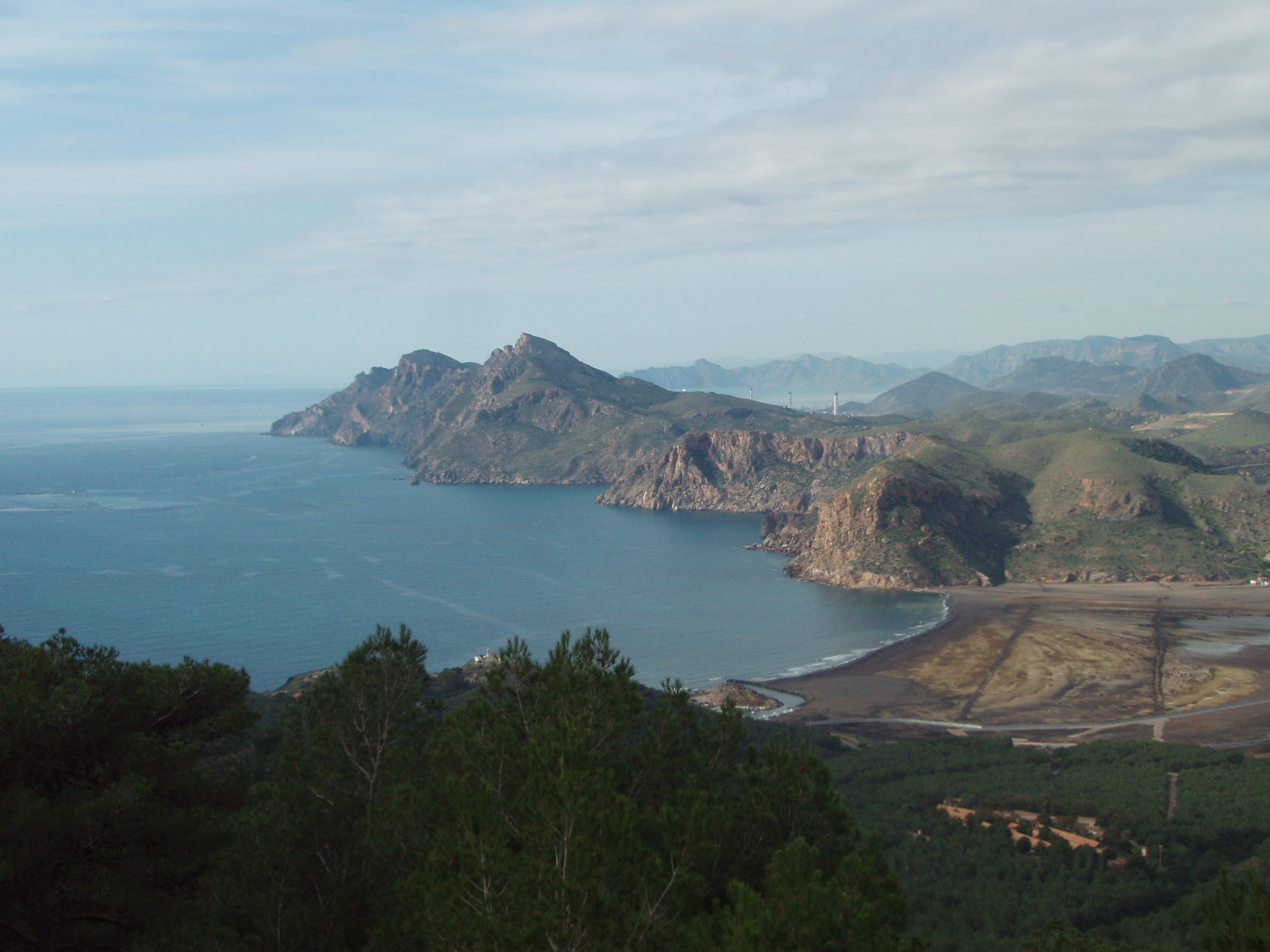
Portmán Bay, clogged by mining waste.

== History ==
Its location, as a natural port near the mines of Cartagena and La Unión, made it a strategic enclave in Roman times. There are numerous remains of Roman mining and industrial facilities for smelting ore throughout the area.

With the new mining boom in the mid-19th century began a new period of great splendor until the mid-20th century.

In 1860 it separated from the municipality of Cartagena to become part of what would later become the municipality of La Unión.

There are numerous events and celebrations that this district celebrates throughout the year and among them highlights the festival in honor of its patron saint James the Great on July 25, not forgetting the traditional procession of the Virgen del Carmen on July 16, Carnival, Easter and the Portman Theatre Festival which has two editions (December and June), organized by the company PortmanTeatro, which receives in each edition numerous theatrical successes both in the Region of Murcia and other companies in the rest of Spain.

For many years, Portmán's economy was based on mining, fishing and tourism. Nowadays the inhabitants of Portmán find employment opportunities in culture and ecotourism.

On August 18, 2011, a serious fire originated in the residential complex La Manga Golf spread rapidly towards the Regional Park of Calblanque, Monte de las Cenizas and Peña del Águila. Arson was suspected.

== Beaches ==
Portmán has two main beaches, Playa de San Bruno (the pedestrian beach of the bay) and Playa del Lastre. Next to the Playa de El Gorguel, in the direction of La Unión, is the Playa or Cala de Cola de Caballo.

== Climatology ==
The summers are very hot (the average in July and August is 37-38 °C), and in winter the minimum temperature does not drop below 8 °C. The annual average is 16-18 °C.

The annual maximum pressure is 970.5 hPa and the minimum 941.2. It rains the most in autumn, less in winter and spring. The average annual rainfall is only 323 mm, although the mist and marine humidity help the existing vegetation a lot.

Winds usually blow from the southwest (dry libeccio) and in autumn from the east or northeast (levant), which brings clouds and rain. In autumn there is also sometimes a libeccio or northwesterly wind, which clears the sky of clouds.

In summer, the strong winds send a certain coolness to the mountains, and when it blows from the south, coming from Africa, the heat lashes the area.

== Archaeological and architectural heritage ==
The intense exploitation of the Sierra Minera de Cartagena since Roman times has left numerous archaeological remains throughout the area.

- The great Roman Villa of Paturro was discovered in the vicinity of the town, between the boundaries of the municipalities of Cartagena and La Union and was linked to the mining operations of the town.
- In the Archaeological Museum of La Unión are preserved numerous remains of mining and smelting of minerals from Roman times, highlighting the mosaics of the Roman Villa of Paturro.
- Casa del Tío Lobo, also known as Casa Zapata de Portmán or Casa Grande de Portmán, owned by the wealthy mining businessman Miguel Zapata Sáez, currently declared of cultural interest (BIC). It was built at the end of the 19th century and initially had only one floor. In 1913 the architect Víctor Beltrí made the project to add the second floor, turning it into a building in the style of a "little French hotel". The ground floor housed the offices and the upper floor the living quarters.

=== Gallery ===
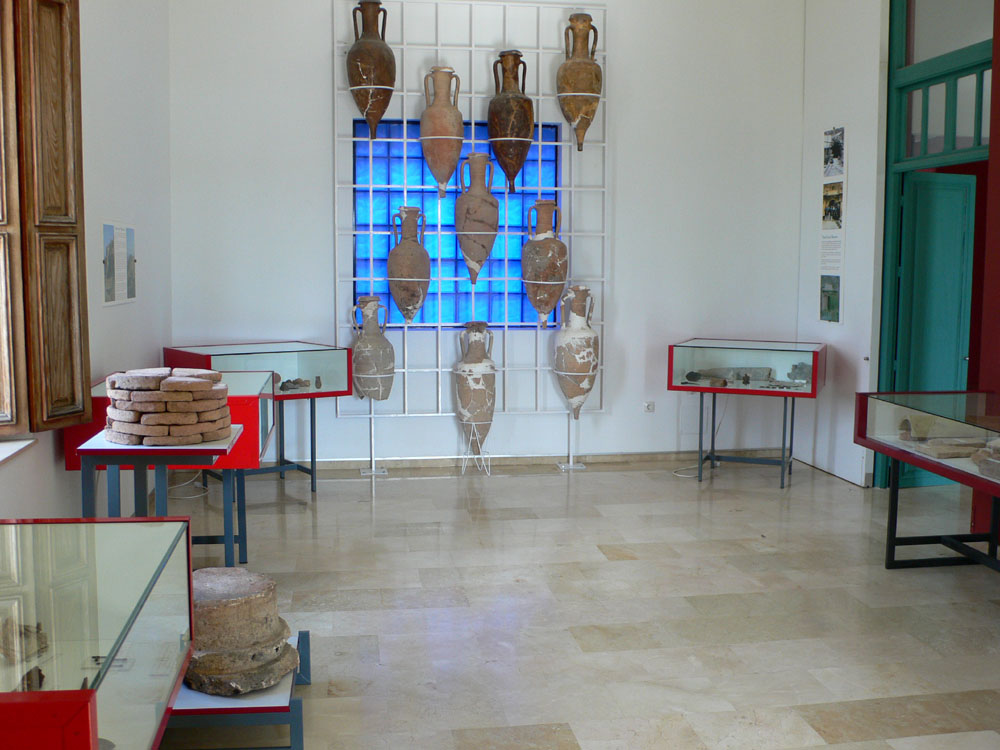
Hall of the Archaeological Museum.

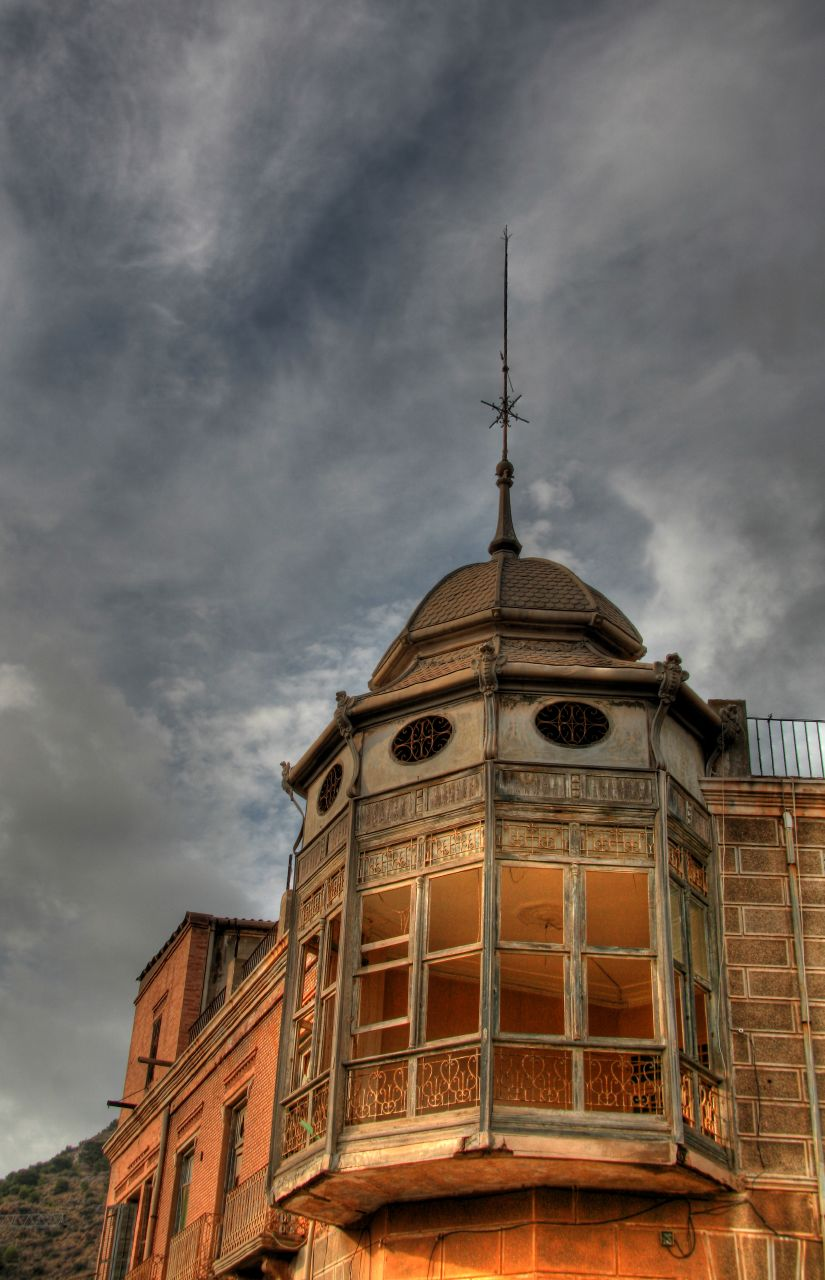
Balcony of the Casa del Tío Lobo.

== Environmental problems ==
The destruction of the bay and port of Portmán, south of the municipality of La Unión, has been one of the greatest ecological attacks in the Mediterranean.

Since the beginning of its exploitation, in 1957, of the pyrites of the Sierra Minera, the company SMM Peñarroya-España produced enormous quantities of mineral debris, the result of the open-pit extraction methods it used as a way of reducing costs. They have been calculated at some 315 million tons of mineral tailings between 1957 and 1987, the date of closure of the mines. In the early stages, this waste was deposited at the foot of the quarries, forming large pits, swamps, etc., which have destroyed the original landscape of the Sierra. However, the biggest problem came from the residues from the washing of the materials used to obtain the ore. Due to its fluidity and volume, it was highly costly to deposit it in ponds or swamps.

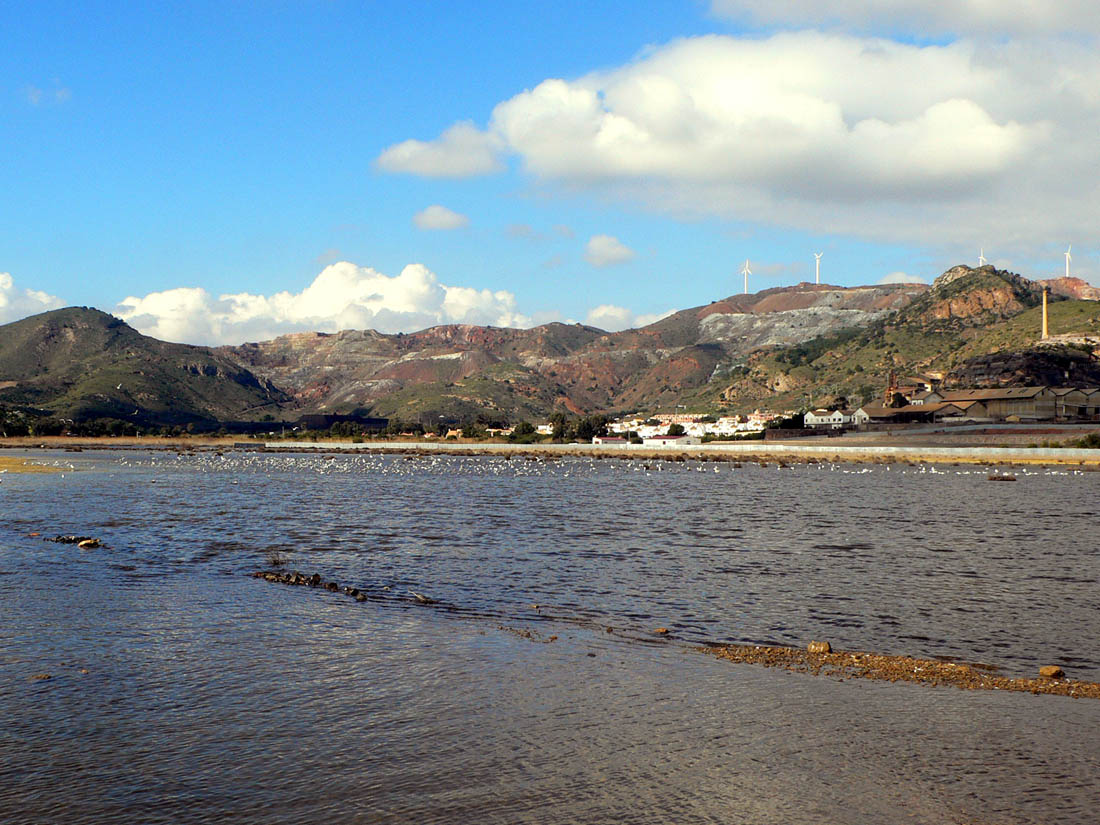
View of the Sancti Spíritus hill with the mining tailings ponds from Portmán Bay.

In view of this, and even before starting the exploitation, the French company Peñarroya, proposed the option of reducing costs by throwing the tailings from its washes directly into the Mediterranean Sea. Since 1950 it applied to the coastal authorities for a permit for these discharges, which was denied on two occasions, in 1954 and 1957. The authorities took into account the toxicity of the discharges and the turbidity that would be caused in the water, with the consequent loss of fishing resources.

However, in January 1958 the authorities changed their mind after meetings with company representatives. The discharges would be allowed under certain conditions: that the discharges would be made by submarine pipeline, at least 400 meters from the coast; that it would be a temporary solution (5 years), that the fishermen would be compensated; that the number of washes and their capacity would not be increased unless tailings storage ponds were built on land; and that if environmental damage was demonstrated, the discharges would be stopped.

These measures were not complied with. In 1961, by ministerial order of November 8, 1961, the distance from the coast was reduced to 250 meters and the limitations were reduced, under the theory that the currents would push them towards the open sea, which was manifestly false.

In 1965 the effects of the spills began to be felt. The company itself admitted internally that Portmán Bay would soon be silted up and that a new strategy would be necessary to continue disposing of the tailings at sea. The solution they found was to consider the irrelevance of Portmán as a port.

In fact, since 1966, the General Directorate of Ports considered the closure, or at least the reduction of the discharges, in view of the progressive unusability of the Portmán port, considered a port of refuge, and the dredging of the port was demanded to the responsible company. In 1967, complaints were repeated from the Murcia Mining Department. In response to this, Peñarroya made timid attempts to dredge the bay.

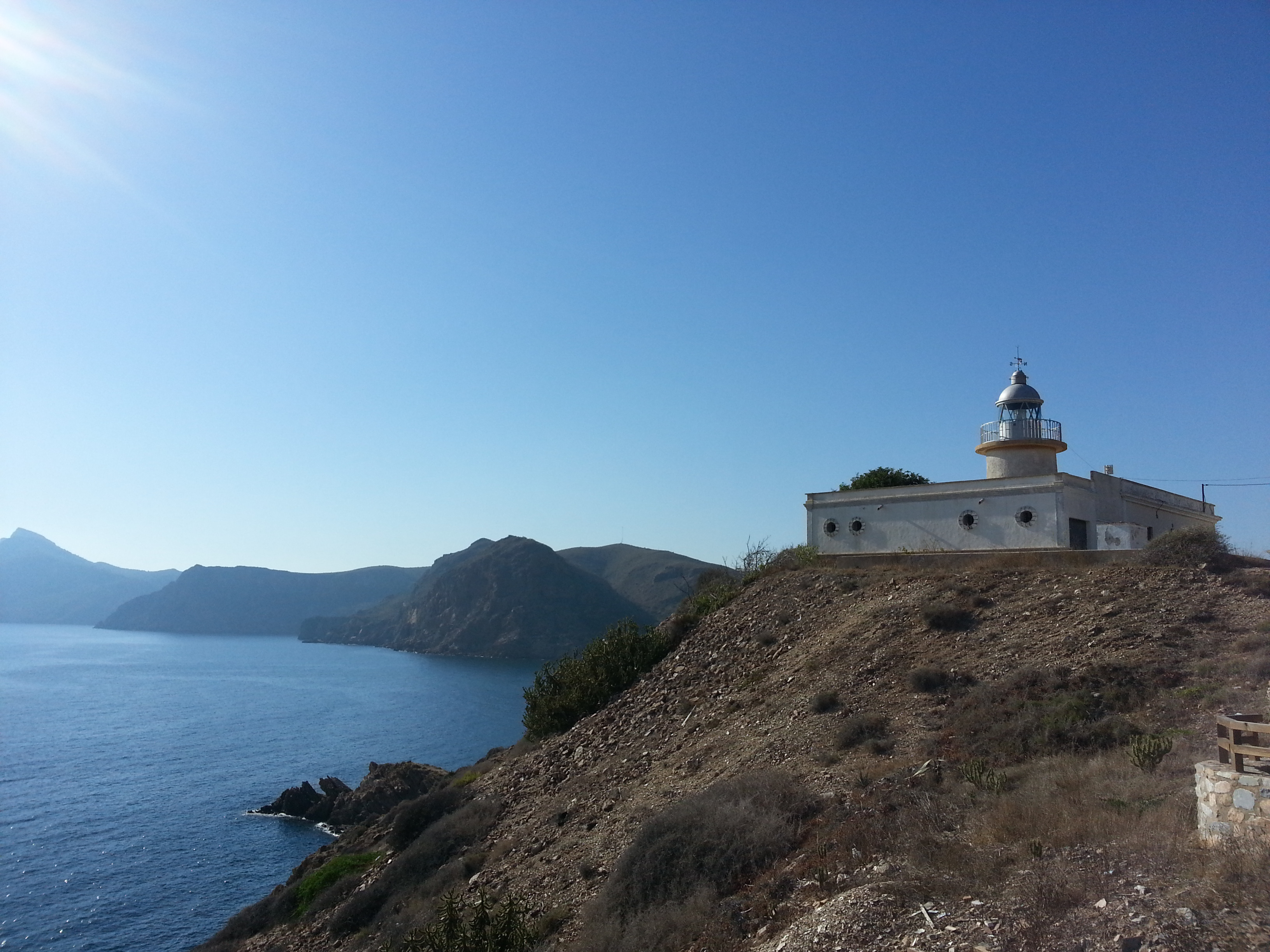
Portman Lighthouse

However, the company is considering expanding mineral production by opening new quarries in the Sierra, expanding the capacity of its washing facilities. In a key decision, it develops a clear strategy, requesting the annulment of Portmán's declaration as a port of refuge and permission to expand the volume of discharges. In exchange, it offered to cede land to build a new port at Cabo de Palos. In June 1967, after meetings with the City Council of Cartagena (which has no jurisdiction over Portmán but does have jurisdiction over Cabo de Palos), and with the Port Authority of Murcia, the final offer was made: the land for the construction of the dock at Cabo de Palos plus 4,000,000 pesetas at the time as compensation. The offer is presented as being promoted by the residents of Cabo de Palos, whom the company will "graciously" help. In exchange, the abandonment of Portmán is requested. It is the moment when the tourist urbanization of La Manga is about to begin, supported by the Ministry of Information and Tourism.

Then the first public reaction against the dumping appeared. The mayor of La Unión sent a letter to the provincial governor, in which the offer of the French multinational was presented as the total disappearance of this mining and fishing town, and would deprive the Municipality of a source of exploitation, for tourism, the only resource that would be left when the deposits were exhausted. The protest fell on deaf ears. On December 15, 1967, an order was published which annulled the dredging works, obliging Peñarroya to reduce the impact of the discharges. Shortly afterwards, on July 21, 1969, an order from the Ministry of Public Works eliminated all limits on the dumping of mineral tailings into the sea.

In July 1968, the company Peñarroya-España was incorporated, with a 2% shareholding in its board of directors, with strong ties to the power centers of Franco's regime. In addition, the French company had the ability to mix its interests with those of the City Council of Cartagena, with those of the promoters who were beginning their expansion in La Manga (such as Tomás Maestre Aznar) and with the expansionist policy of the Ministry of Information and Tourism. Precisely at the time of publication of the ministerial order, the company contributed the land on which the port of Cabo de Palos was to be built, plus 25,000,000 pesetas for its construction. The expected profits would be higher. In fact, the agreement allowed the exit of a profit strangulation and the beginning of a process of great growth in production. This can be seen in the value of the lead production of the Peñarroya smelter in Saint Lucia.

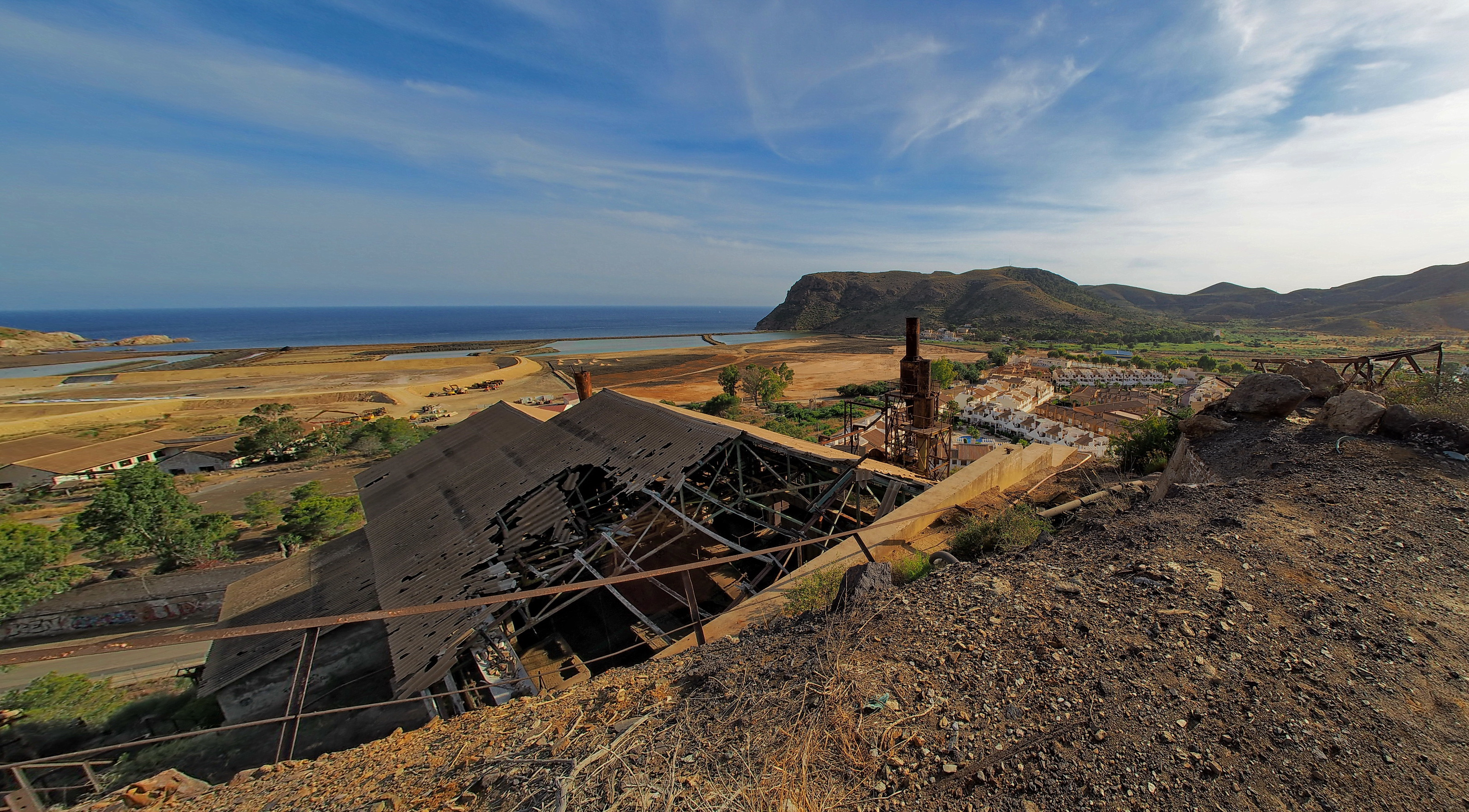
The bay of Portmán from the Lavadero Roberto.

An attempt to publicize the reality in the press, in the Madrid newspaper Pueblo, was stopped by "pressure from above".

The Town Council of La Unión then lodged an appeal for reconsideration with the Ministry of Public Works, which was rejected, followed by an appeal to the courts. On December 21, 1971, the Supreme Court ruled definitively. In the sentence, it recognized the validity of the reasons of the City Council of La Unión, but ruled in favor of the Peñarroya company, in a resolution that was considered to be typical of the late phase of the dictatorship. From that moment on, the discharges were uncontrolled.

With the arrival of democracy, the controversy flared up again in the local press in 1977. But again the "pressures" succeeded in silencing the issue. Not even the actions of some politicians in 1977-78 achieved anything, in the face of the influence and pressures, there has even been talk of bribes from the Peñarroya company. In 1978 the company obtained permits to increase the volume of discharges, despite the fact that at this time the toxicity of the tailings dumped was already well known, both for the high concentration of heavy metals (cadmium, lead), and for the presence of toxic products used in the washing of the ore (copper sulfate, sodium cyanide, zinc sulfate, sulfuric acid, among others) that many years after the cessation of mining activity continues to affect the health of the inhabitants.

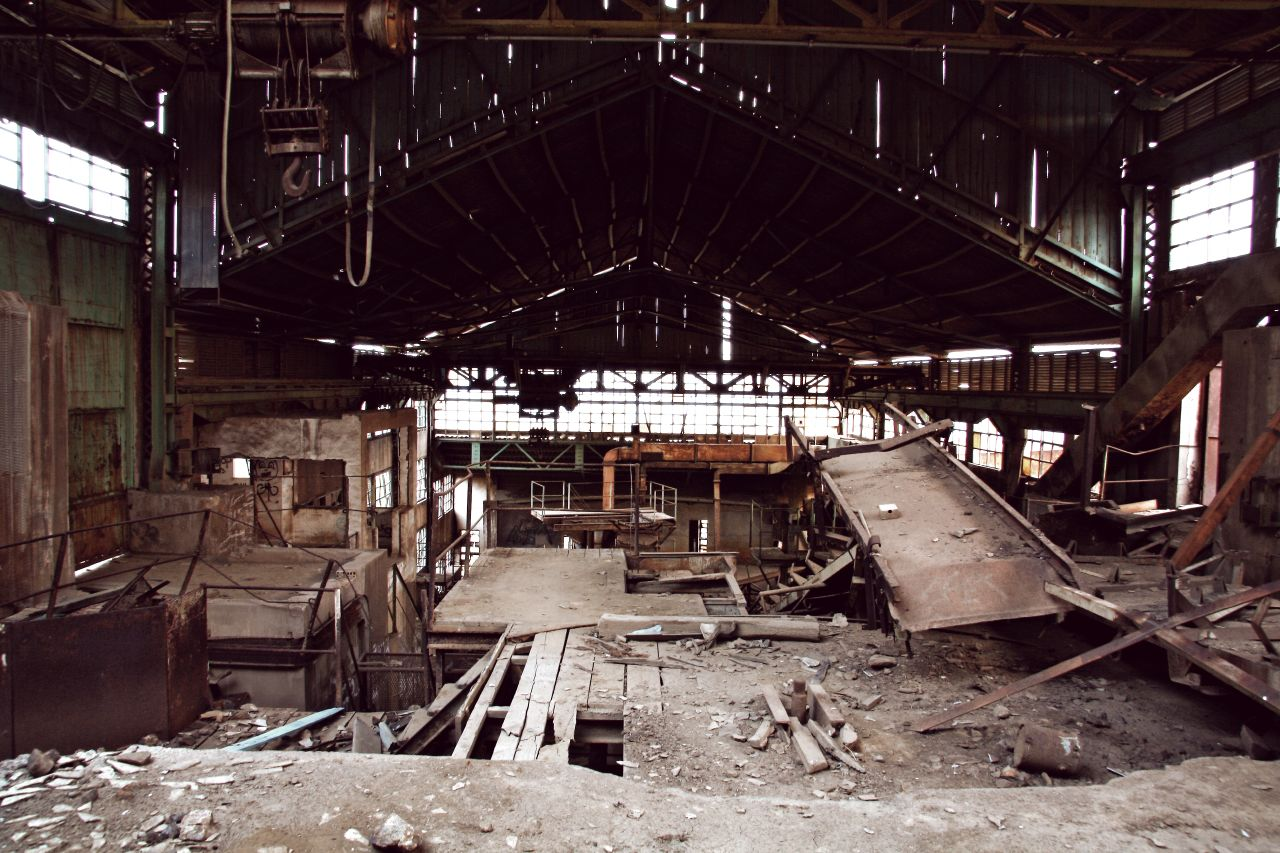
Interior of Lavadero Roberto.

In 1979, the ministry hit the bay again when it allowed the discharges of another mineral washery, the 'Lavadero Eugenia', to be connected to the same pipe of the 'Roberto' washery.

From 1980 onwards, social and journalistic pressure increased. In 1986 there was even an action by the international environmental association Greenpeace, with some of its members chaining themselves to the waste pipes.

From the beginning of the 1980s, the mining activity went into losses. In addition, both at the political level, especially since 1982, with plans for the regeneration of the bay, and at the social level, a definitive solution is beginning to be demanded. There are also labor problems, due to the workers' fear of losing their jobs. The attempts to extend the mining exploitation to new quarries clashed with the radical opposition of the neighbors of Llano del Beal, in 1987–88.

In this context, Peñarroya looked for a way out, and in the midst of negotiations opened on different fronts (stoppage of dumping, obligation to recover Portmán Bay, promises to maintain the activity, requests to extend the exploitations), on September 20, 1988, SMM Peñarroya (financed by the Rothschild Bank), disappeared from the scene, acquiring its properties the company Portmán Golf, which put an end to the mining activity that had been developed by SMM Peñarroya under the protection of the Administration.

=== Natural disaster in Portmán Bay ===
In the last two decades the need for the regeneration of the Bay has become more evident, which has led to the local and regional organization of the administration, as well as a league of neighbors, to request investment funds from the state government to restore and clean its waters. The final approval of the project, at national and European level, takes place in 2011 and involves the investment of 79,402,304 million euros by the Ministry of Environment. But after the change of government in December of the same year, the situation has been in retreat, occurring in 2012 a withdrawal of the contracting process from the Ministry of Agriculture, Fisheries and Environment, leaving the claims of the hamlet in a deadlock.

=== Current works ===
After reaching an agreement expected for decades, finally Portmán Bay is now a site under construction, which has caused discomfort.

The landscape that is currently observed when strolling through the bay is dominated by two rafts/boats, theoretically waterproofed and whose construction is already completed, which block the view of the bay. These rafts will become the place where, in the future, the tailings removed will be dredged and subsequently transferred to the Corta San José quarry, where precisely part of them came from in the past.

In addition, work has already begun on the construction of a third pond, which will complete the volume required for the tailings to be removed from the Bay for drying. This natural site holds two million cubic meters of tailings.

The ponds are necessary for the drying process, taking into account that the dredged material is made up of 75 percent water and 25 percent sand and heavy metals.

This is one of the projects, the implementation of which started in October 2016. Authorities and technicians announced that for the following year a conveyor belt would be installed to run from the old port to a cut to transport the already dried tailings, which has not been carried out due to the environmental risk.

The dredging of the bay may cause high toxicity.

== Influence ==
There is a 2001 documentary film directed by Miguel Martí, entitled Portmán, a la sombra de Roberto with images and interviews that show the environmental disaster of the town and the Sierra Minera and the neighborhood conflict for the survival of Llano del Beal in the 80's of the 20th century.

== See also ==
- Mar Menor

== Bibliography ==
- Montes, Ricardo; Zapata, Antonio J. (2023). "I Congreso Sierra Minera". Ayuntamiento de la Unión: Asociación Cultural Qutiyyyas: Asociación LAEC. La Ecocultural. Los Alcázares (in Spanish).
