= Histology and Histopathology =

- Discipline: Histology, histopathology
- Language: English
- Edited by: Francisco Hernández, Juan F. Madrid

Publication details
- History: 1986-present
- Publisher: University of Murcia (Spain)
- Frequency: Monthly
- Impact factor: 2.025 (2016)

Standard abbreviations
- ISO 4: Histol. Histopathol.

Indexing
- CODEN: HIHIES
- ISSN: 0213-3911 (print); 1699-5848 (web)
- OCLC no.: 57732033

Links
- Journal homepage; Online archive

Histology and Histopathology is a monthly peer-reviewed medical journal publishing original and review articles in the fields of histology and histopathology. It was established in 1986 and is published by the University of Murcia in Spain. The editors-in-chief are Francisco Hernández and Juan F. Madrid (University of Murcia). According to the Journal Citation Reports, the journal has a 2016 impact factor of 2.025.
