= Jorge Maíz Chacón =

Spanish historian

Jordi Maíz Chacón (born 26 September 1977) is a Spanish medieval historian, specialized in historiography, economic history, and social minorities.

Since 2002, Maíz works as a professor at the UNED in the Balearic Islands, as well as a secondary school teacher in Mallorca. He is a member of the Center for Medieval Studies at the University of Murcia and an editor of Medievalismo, a Spanish website dedicated to medieval history.

== Works ==
His works include:

Books - History

- Viure al marge. La vida quotidiana dels jueus de Mallorca (segles XIII-XIV), Lleonard Muntaner Editor, Palma, 2013. ISBN 978-84-15592-43-3
- Breve historia de los reinos ibéricos, Ariel, Barcelona, 2013. ISBN 978-84-344-0580-6
- Los judíos de Baleares en la Baja Edad Media. Economía y política, UNED - Netbiblo, La Coruña, 2010. ISBN 978-84-362-5922-3
- Actas del IV Simposio Internacional de Jóvenes Medievalistas, Ayutamiento de Lorca - Universidad de Murcia, Murcia, 2009. ISBN 978-84-8371-801-8, 287 págs

Books - Poetry

- Los suculentos quejidos de la turba, Baile del Sol, Tegueste - Tenerife, 2013.
- Los infractores con la careta de la revancha, Germania, Alzira, 2013. ISBN 978-84-15660-38-5
- 'Piedra, papel, cizallas' en: Campamento Dignidad. Poemas para la conciencia, Baladre y Zambra, Málaga, 2013.
- Muchedumbres, Calumnia Ediciones, Palma, 2011.
- 'El Estado y el Camaleón' en: 65 Salvocheas, Quorum, Cádiz, 2011.
- La cárcava de los iracundos, Insomnus, Palma, 2010. Poemario ilustrado
