= Enrique Máximo García =

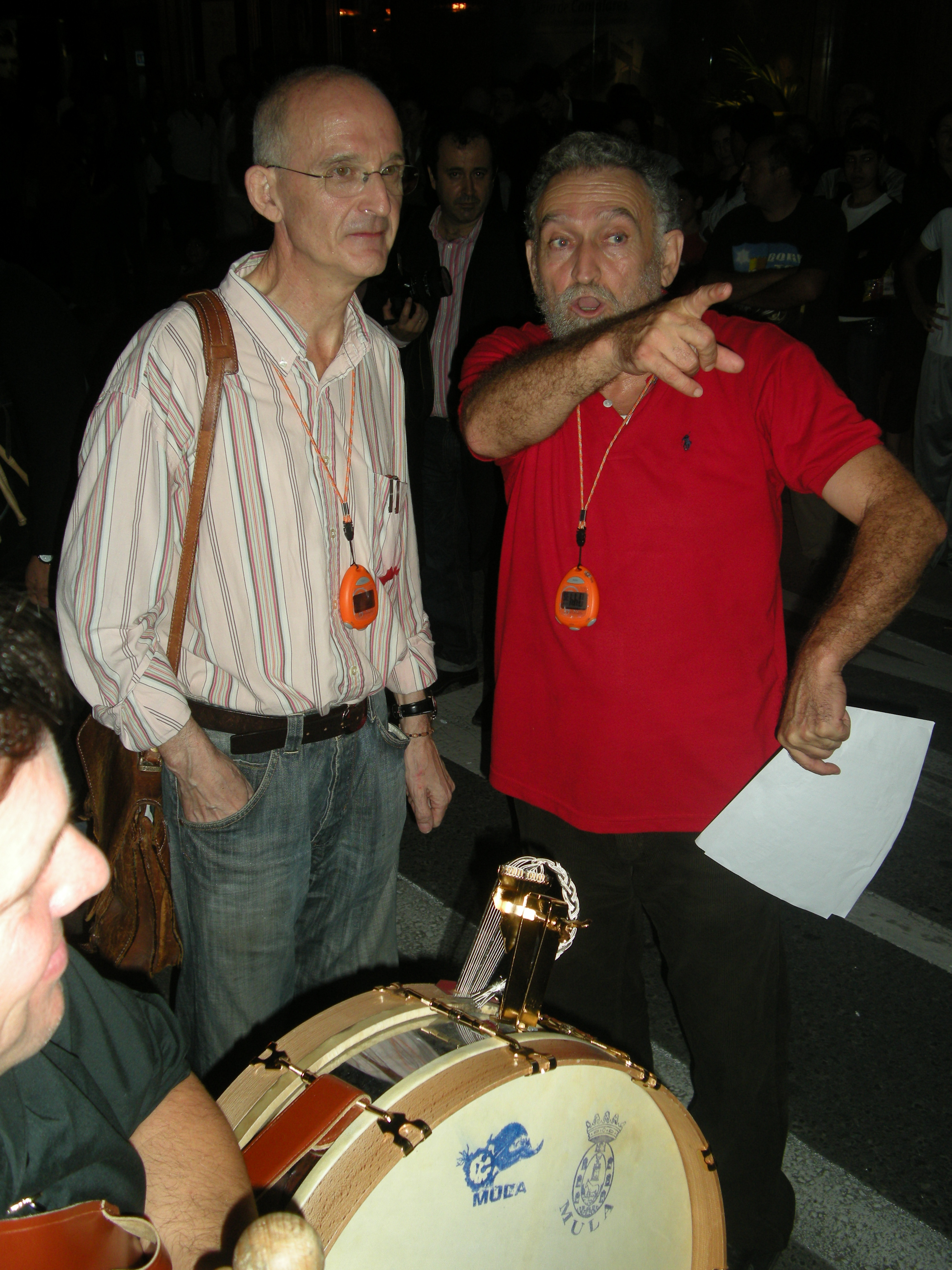
- Born: 1954; Murcia
- Died: 2008 (aged 53–54); Murcia
- Occupations: Educator, musicologist
- Employer: University of Murcia

Enrique Máximo García (Murcia, 1954–2008) was a Spanish musicologist and associated teacher at the Art History Department of the University of Murcia. He was also a co-director of the Repsol LAH Program for the Recovery of Latin American Musical Heritage, sponsored by UNESCO. In 1994, he helped to organize the "Concert for the Senses" (Spanish: Concierto de los Sentidos). Hundreds of people walking counter-clockwise around the cathedral of Murcia for 45 minutes, were accompanied by 1,000 musicians and the sound of more than 200 bells from all town's churches.

== Biography ==
Máximo graduated in chemistry, served as a high school mathematics teacher, and was an expert in the field of bells and early organs.

== Research ==
Máximo recovered, together with Manuel Pérez Sánchez, both under the guidance of Alejandro Massó, the musical legacy of the Court composer Juan Oliver Astorga (Yecla 1773 – Madrid 1830). He also researched on the 18th Century keyboard instruments maker, Tadeo Tornel. His work led to the discovery of two important Tornel fortepianos, (an ancient keyboard instrument), among the few keyboards extant in Spain dating from the Age of Enlightenment.

== Work ==
- El órgano Merklin Schütze de la catedral de Murcia, Enrique Máximo García, Cajamurcia, Murcia, ISBN 84-88627-06-8, 1994.
- Tadeo Tornel, «ymbentor de ynstrumentos de música», Enrique Máximo García, Imafronte 15:167–182, 2000–2001.
- El "otro" Imafronte de la Catedral de Murcia: la renovación de campanas (1790–1818), Enrique Máximo García, Imafronte 19–20:195–252, 2007–2008.
- Joseph LLopis y el Organo de Elche de la Sierra, Enrique Máximo García, In: Ramón Fernández y Fernández (ed.), Organo de la Iglesia Santa Quiteria. Elche de la Sierra, Asociación Cultural Santa Quiteria, Elche de la Sierra, ISBN 978-84-611-9336-3, 2008, pp. 58–104.
