= Calblanque Regional Park =

Regional park in Region of Murcia, Spain

Coordinates: 37°36′27″N 00°45′00″W

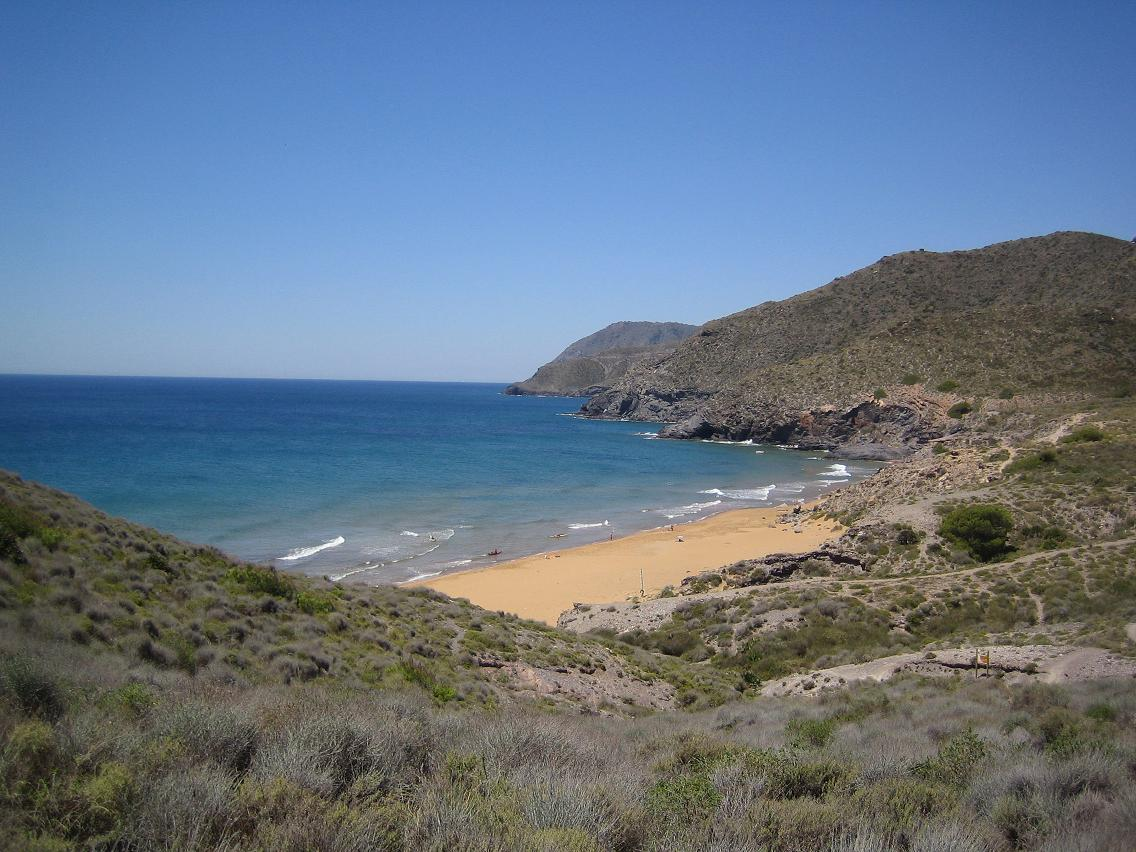

Calblanque Regional Park, Monte de las Cenizas y Peña del Águila is a regional park in the south-east of Spain, and in this country in the autonomous community Región de Murcia. In this region, it is located in the municipalities Cartagena and La Unión. It is part of Sierra Minera, a mountain chain in the Baetic System.

It is one of the best preserved areas in the Mediterranean littoral in spite of human activities and interactions. The two last facts brings this area a cultural value.

In regards of its geology, there are two kinds of lithology: metamorphic rocks and Quaternary sediments. Overall, there are the most ancient rocks in The Region of Murcia and the most recent ones, which are altered by sundry erosion processes. These phenomenon turn into the existence of beaches, risks, natural arcs, and tafoni.

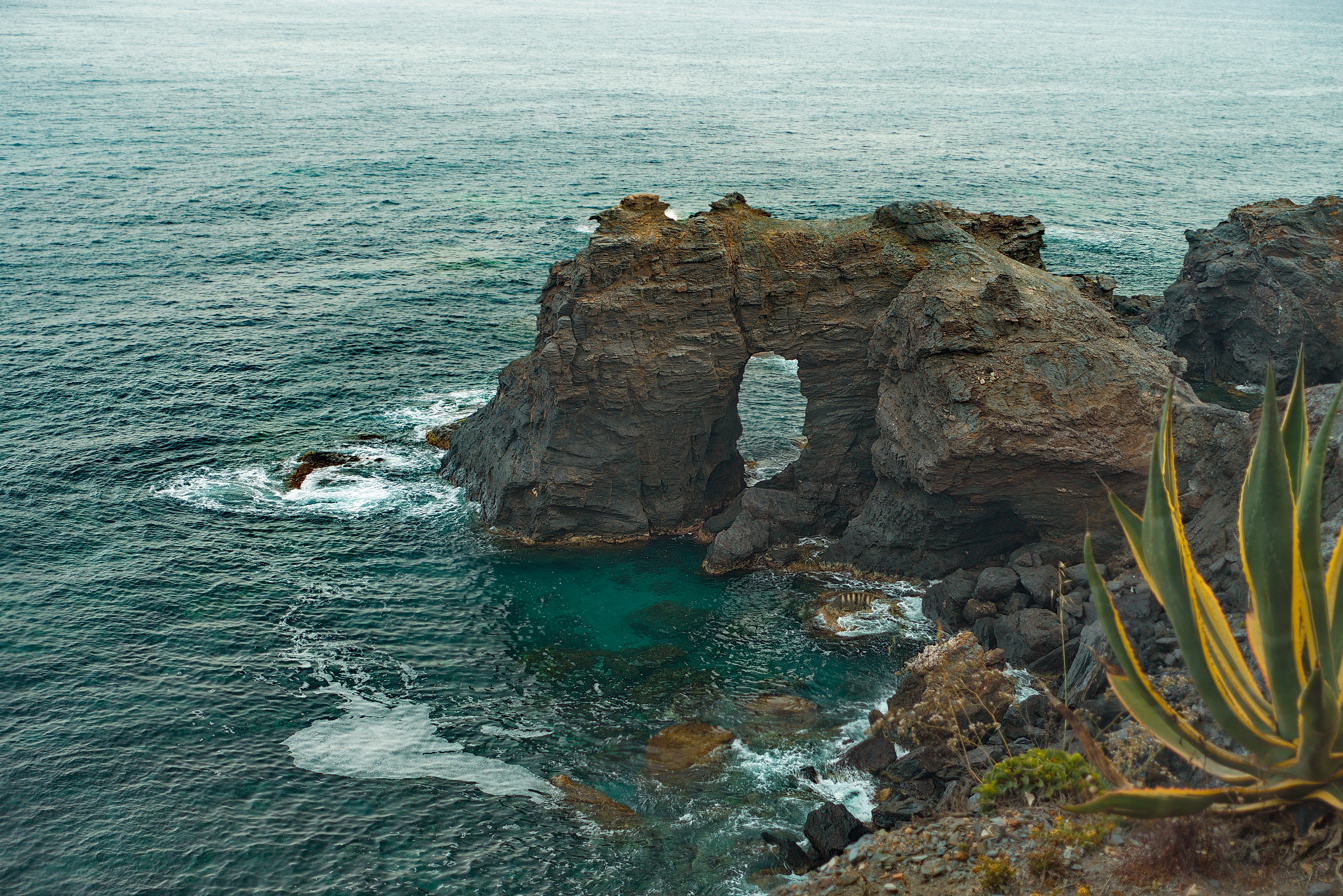
Arco de los Reyes, a natural arch located within Calblanque Regional Park

There is a large diversity of habitats, including slopes, forests, and sandy areas.

== Fauna ==
There are birds like little egrets, stilts, avocets, kentish plovers, audoin's gulls, peregrine falcons, Eurasian eagle-owls, Bonelli's eagles, badgers, beech martens, also fish like Spanish toothcarps and reptiles like Chalcides bedriagai (Bedriaga's skinks), Malpolon monspessulanus (Montpellier snakes) and ocellated lizards and finally animals of other Phyli like crinoids.

== Flora ==
There are plants like Cistus heterophyllus (more or less close to hoary rockrose and to goldenheathers), Asparagus macrorrhizus (more or less close to blue funnel-lilies), Lotus creticus, sea hollies and Pallenis maritimae (more or less close to common cudweeds).

== Locales ==
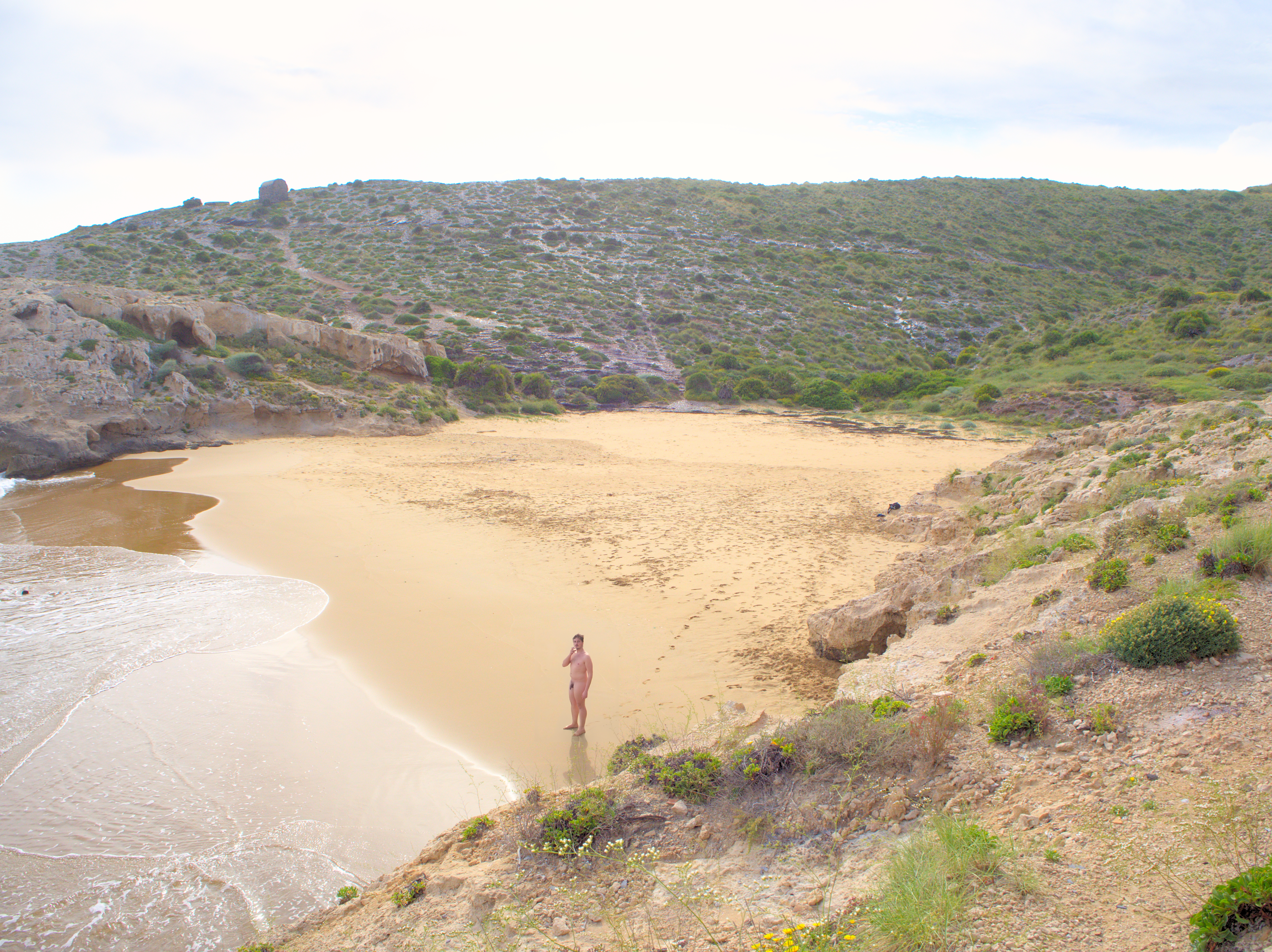
Cala de los déntoles, a small cove on the eastern part of calblanque

In this list there are the most important places and spots:

- Cala de los Déntoles (also locally known as Cala Dorada)
- Peña del águila (hill)
- Cala Arturo
- Cala del Barco
- Cabezo de la Fuente
- Cabezo del Horno
- Cala Magre
- Negrete Beach
- Las Cañas Beach
- Parreño Beach
- Punta Negra
- Punta Espada
