= Carmen Conde =

Spanish poet, narrative writer and teacher

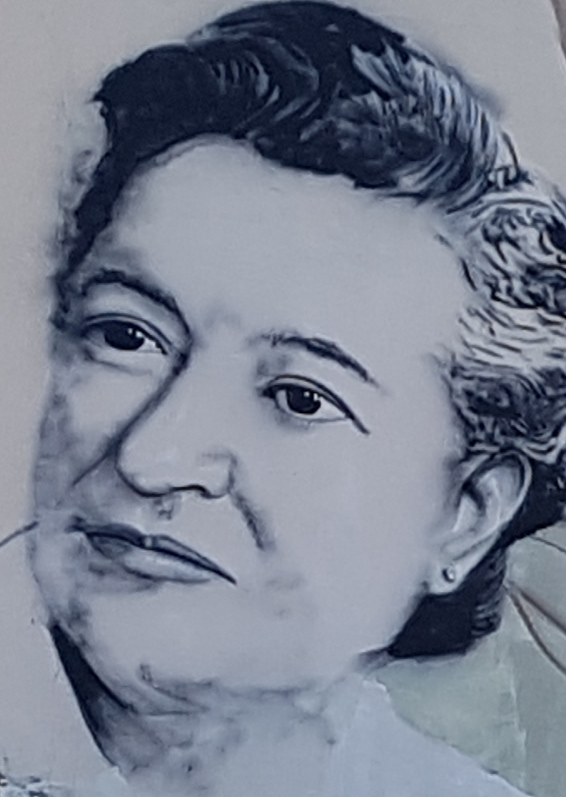
- Born: Carmen Conde Abellán; 15 August 1907; Cartagena, Spain
- Died: 8 January 1996 (aged 88); Madrid, Spain
- Occupations: Poet, narrative writer, teacher
- Writing career
- Pen name: Florentina del Mar

Seat K of the Real Academia Española
- In office 28 January 1979 – 8 January 1996
- Preceded by: Miguel Mihura (Note: Mihura was elected for the position in 1976 but never took the seat)
- Succeeded by: Ana María Matute

Carmen Conde Abellán (15 August 1907 – 8 January 1996) was a Spanish poet, narrative writer and teacher. In 1931 she founded the first Popular University of Cartagena, along with her husband Antonio Oliver Belmás. She was also the first woman to become an academic numerary of the Real Academia Española, where she delivered her induction speech in 1979.

== Biography ==
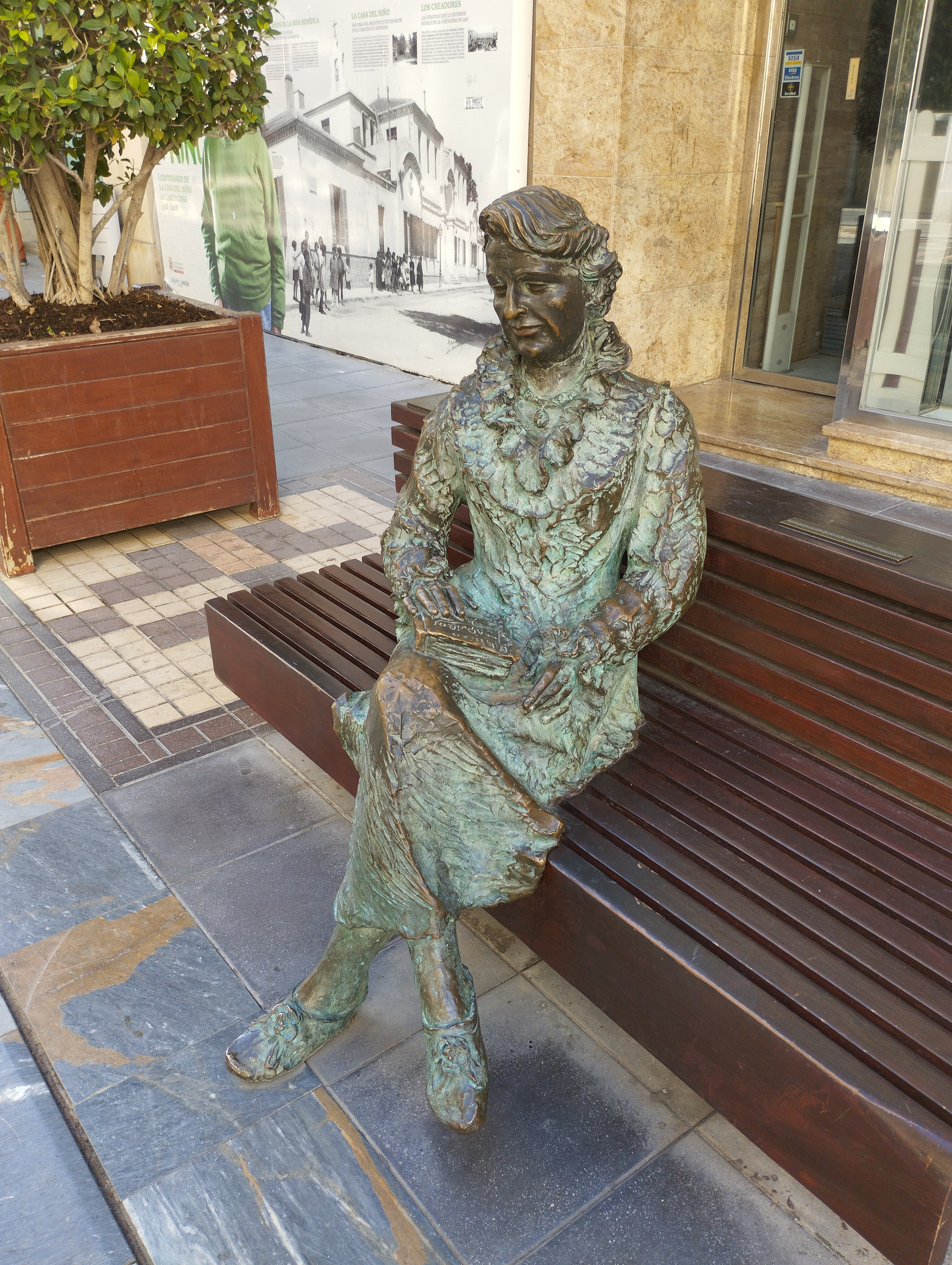
Monument to Carmen Conde

At the age of 7, she moved with her family to Melilla, where she lived until 1920. The memoir from that period were collected in Empezando la vida. In 1923, she passed the competitive exam for Auxiliary at the Drafting Room of the Sociedad Española de Construcción Naval, where she started to work. She began her contributions to local newspapers one year later. At the age of 19, she started her studies in Education at a teacher training college, the Escuela Normal de Maestras de Murcia.

In 1927, she met the Spanish poet Antonio Oliver Belmás, formalizing their relationship. She wrote in Ley: (entregas de capricho) and also in Obra en marcha: diario poético in 1928, both magazines published by Juan Ramón Jiménez for a minority audience. In 1929, she wrote her fourth work, Brocal, and she finished her Education studies at the Escuela Normal de Albacete in 1930. On 5 December 1931, she married Antonio and they both founded the first Popular University of Cartagena. In 1933, they both created the magazine Presencia, a body at this institution. The University had an adults' library, children's library as well as educational cinema, and it organized events such as conference programs, art exhibitions, etc. It was supported by the Patronato de Misiones Pedagógicas. Carmen also worked as a teacher in the Escuela Nacional de Párvulos at El Retén.

In 1934, Carmen Conde published Júbilos, prologued by Gabriela Mistral and illustrated by Norah Borges. She worked as Inspector-Monitor of Studies at El Pardo Orphanage, until she resigned in 1935. Over this year, the couple contributed to national newspapers like El Sol, as well as to other Spanish American serial publications.

When the Spanish Civil War broke out, her husband joined the republican troops, leading the Popular Front Radio Station num. 2. Carmen followed him through several Andalusian cities, but she returned to Cartagena to look after her mother. The Civil War outbreak forced them in July 1936 to give up the invitation from Gabriela Mistral (by then Consul of Chile in Lisboa), before traveling to France and Belgium, to study folklore institutions in those countries, for which she had obtained a grant. Likewise, she attended courses at the Faculty of Letters in Valencia, passing the competitive exam for Librarian, although she never practiced.

In 1937, Conde began an intimate relationship with Amanda Junquera Butler, whom she had met the previous year. Because of legal and social conditions at the time, neither publicly acknowledged their relationship, nor divorced. Marked by authorities as a threat because she was a pro-Republican intellectual, Conde fled at the end of the war to Madrid with Junquera and went into hiding. Her husband was exiled to live in isolation in Murcia, but Conde continued to live with Junquera and her husband, Cayetano Alcázar Molina, in Madrid and San Lorenzo de El Escorial until 1945. She managed to communicate with her husband through José Ballester Nicolás, director of La Verdad (a regional newspaper in Murcia) and Correos employee. In 1945, Oliver was allowed to move to Madrid and Conde joined him in an apartment, though their relationship was in name only.

Her husband Antonio Oliver died in 1968, and Conde moved to Junquero's home in Madrid permanently. Three years later, Carmen promoted the complete compilation of his works. On 28 January 1979, she was elected as numeric member of the Real Academia Española, taking the "k" seat, and delivering her induction speech entitled "Poesía ante el tiempo y la inmortalidad". Known primarily as a poet and inspiration to a younger generation of writers, she also published eight novels.

She spent the last years of her life, between 1992 and 1996, living in an old people's residency in Majadahonda (Madrid). In 1992, she wrote her testament leaving the complete collection of literary works by her and her husband to the City Hall of Cartagena, her hometown. Conde acknowledged her relationship with Junquero in her autobiography and dedicated many works to her partner and muse during her lifetime. In 2007, José Luis Ferris published Carmen Conde: vida, pasión y verso de una escritora olvidada (Carmen Conde: Life, Passion and Verse of a Forgotten Writer), which publicly chronicled the relationship of Conde and Junquera.

== Tributes ==
- In 1984, the publisher Ediciones Torremozas established the Carmen Conde Women's Poetry Award in her honor.
- On August 15, 2018, Google celebrated her 111th birthday with a Google Doodle.

== See also ==
- Universidad Popular de Cartagena
