= La Unión, Murcia =

La Unión
- Municipality
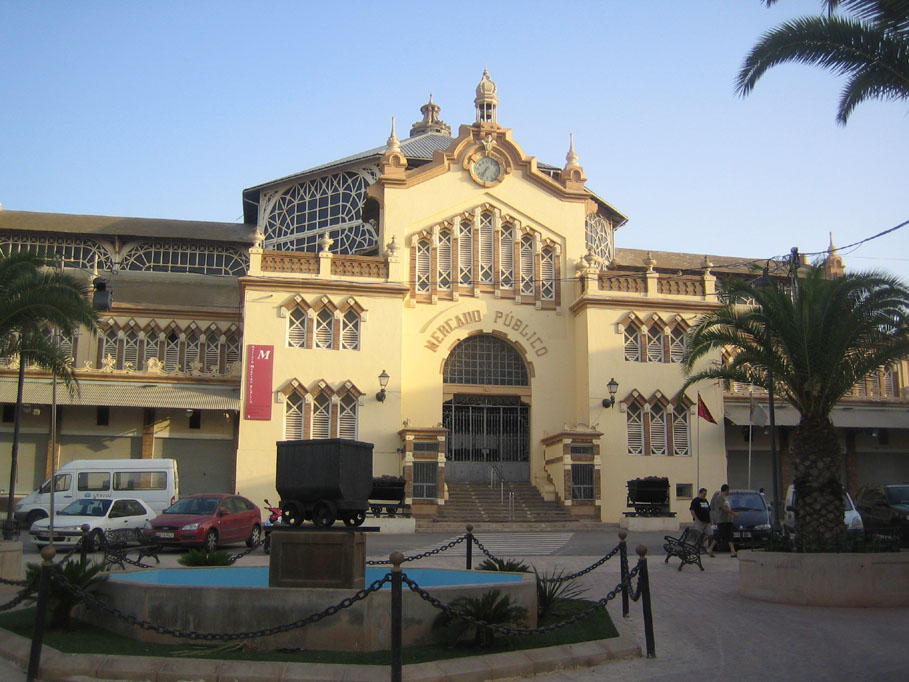

- Coat of arms

- Location in Murcia

- Location in Murcia Location in Spain
- Country: Spain
- Autonomous Community: Region of Murcia
- Province: Region of Murcia
- Comarca: Campo de Cartagena
- Own municipality: 1860

Government
  - Mayor: Francisco M.ª Bernabé Pérez (PP)

Area
  - Total: 25 km^{2} (9.7 sq mi)
- Elevation (AMSL): 86 m (282 ft)

Population (2025-01-01)
  - Total: 21,380
  - Density: 860/km^{2} (2,200/sq mi)
- Time zone: UTC+1 (CET)
  - Summer (DST): UTC+2 (CEST (GMT +2))
- Postal code: 30360
- Area code: +34 (Spain) + 968 (Murcia)
- Website: Official website

La Unión is situated in the Region of Murcia in the southeast of Spain. It has an area of 24.6 km², and had a population of 19,907 on 1 January 2018. It has an elevation of 86 m. Its average annual temperature is 17 °C. It has balmy winters. The sun shines 320 days per year. La Unión is situated in one of the sunniest areas in Europe; this kind of climate makes possible the many leisure activities, popular fiestas, sports, and cultural activities that are held in the town. The town is linked by a regular train to Cartagena which allows views of the past industrial heritage of the area (lead, alum and silver mining) and the more modern occupations of agriculture and tourism. La Unión lies within the built-up area of Cartagena and is surrounded on all landward sides by the City of Cartagena.

The rich mines of La Union provided most of the silver and lead needed by the Late Roman Republic, as it was studied by the archaeologist Eulalia Sintas Martínez.

== Geography ==
This municipality has varied relief. This is due to the fact that part of Sierra Minera (a mountain range) occupies the municipality. The most important mountain of this territory is probably Sancti Spiritu.

Besides the mountain reliefs, there are other geographic spots in La Unión. There are some beaches such as Playa El Lastre and Playa de San Bruno. A bay also occupies the territory and its name is Bahía de Portmán.

== Demography ==
This municipality was inhabited by 20,225 people in 2019. These inhabitants live in the localities of Portmán (997), Roche (1,488) and La Unión (17,740). 9.99% inhabitants are foreigners.

The table below shows the population evolution from the year 1860 to the year 2011.

	1860	1877	1887	1897	1900	1910	1920	1930
De facto population	8,001	22,122	21,103	21,594	30,275	30,249	24,837	11,776
De jure population		21,332	20,127	21,260	28,479	29,599	30,016	12,280
Households	1,647	5,341	5,905	6,257	7,545	7,874	6,815	3,405

	1940	1950	1960	1970	1981	1991	2001	2011
De facto population	10,079	10,031	11,687	13,145	14,097	13,732		
De jure population	10,604	10,156	11,679	13,227	14,262	13,940	14,451	18,965
Households	2,612	2,821	2,843	3,365	3,664	3,866	4,392	6,545

== History ==
The sea location of Portmán led to the arrival of Phoenician vessels whose people were interested in the place. In this place, the Phoenicians developed mining activities. Their reason was just commercial.

In this municipality ceramic pots originating from Hellenic civilization were discovered in the archaeological site of Cabezo Agudo. There are also remains of the Iberian people in this area.

During the period of Carthaginian control in no little part of the Iberian Peninsula, these people found mining resources in the area of this current municipality. These materials and the esparto were the main resources of the Carthaginian economy. In spite of that fact, mining activities were not more relevant until the Roman Hispania period.

The Romans conquered Kart-Hadast (the current city of Cartagena in Spain) in the year 209 BC and established in this area. In the place of the previous Kart-Hadast, they set the city Carthago Nova. The area of this current municipality became a space for setting villae and mining areas. Some remaining structures are Villa Paturro.

After the Roman Hispania period and in the era of the arrival and presence of the Visigoths in Murcia, there was a decline in the littoral of Campo de Cartagena. The reasons for that fact were the continuous invasions of the Byzantines and the mining activities did not practically take place.

During the Islamic presence era there were not many inhabitants in this territory. In this period, as well as the previous one, there was not much interest in the mining activities in La Unión. This kind of activities began to be considered more interesting after the Reconquista.

After this period of the Reconquista, after the Treaty of Alcaraz, and after Alfonso X of Castile had established the Kingdom of Murcia, the mining in La Unión became more relevant. The property and the usufruct of some mines were allowed only to the monarchs of the Crown of Castile, but they could be awarded to individuals with the payment of fees. A law in which there was an authorisation about looking for, trying and digging mines in the court of Briviesca in the year 1387. In the reign of the Catholics Monarchs ordinances, in which services and rights of miner people were awarded, were signed.

There is little information and knowledge about La Unión in the Early modern period. In spite of the fact that the mining in this area began to gain weight, it was not relevant until the 19th century. Before that century, the inhabitants of the future municipality made their livings with the cattle industry and agriculture, but the mining activities were part of the economic activities of this territory.

In the year 1527, the emperor Charles V conceded Francisco de los Cobos a permit for utilising the metals of the municipality of Cartagena, to which La unión used to belong. There are some documentary sources about the Sierra minera of Cartagena and La Unión (a mountain range in both current municipalities). King Philippe II of Spain signed an order which awards Felipe del Río permission to extract silver and lead. The mountain of the extraction of these two metals is Sancti Spiritu, where the current town of La Unión is settled.

There was a resurgence in the Late modern period in La Unión and it happened especially after 1840. This resurgence was part of the mining activities dynamic of Spain.

One of the main consequences of this mining boom was the large increase of the population in this area. This increase in inhabitants had its origin in the waves of immigration coming from Andalusia whose people settled in the areas in Región de Murcia where there were more mining activities. The people who settled in La Unión came mostly from Almería.

On 1 January 1860, La Unión, Roche and Portmán were conceded a town council, in that time its name was Villa El Garbanzal. In 1868, there were some disagreements among the locals and this led to the name change of this new municipality — its name became the current name of "La Unión". The town was connected by railway to Cartagena in 1874 by what is now known as the Cartagena–Los Nietos line.

A period of new splendour took place in this recent municipality from the last years of the 19th century and the first of the 20th century. This mining boom did not just result in an increase of population - As a result of it, there were relevant urban alterations. Concrete cases are the constructions of la Casa del Piñón, the building for the public market (antiguo Mercado Público) and the church of El Rosario.

From the first decades of the 20th century, the mining decline became inevitable, especially from 1914, the year when World War I began. The years during the Spanish Civil War were hard for the inhabitants of La Unión. Impoverishment and hunger were predominant in this period. Despite that hard situation, there was not any riot or revolution unlike the case of Asturias, other mining area.

In the 1950s, there was an economic and mining improvement, as methods in the use of mining came to this territory. Mining areas which had been neglected were reused and their residue materials were taken advantage.

The period of prosperity did not last long, and the definitive closing of the mining areas occurred in 1991. The exhaustion of the mining sources did not make it possible for the business to remain because it stopped being profitable.

In the 1980s, La Unión gradually became a dormitory-town.

== Economy ==
18.1% of the territory is utilised as croplands in 2019 and the most widely grown products are the celeries, the lettuces, the potatoes, the melons and the citrus. 10.78% agreements were written for jobs of the agriculture and fishing sector in 2019. 69.59% agreements occurred in the service sector in 2019.

== Facilities ==
=== Healthcare ===
A consultorio (primary care centre with the fewest functions) can be found in Portmán and another one in Roche. There is a centro de salud (primary care centre) in the main town.

=== Education ===
The main town hosts 4 early childhood and primary education centres (CEIP) and 2 secondary education centres (IES). There is also an early childhood and primary education centre in Portmán and another one in Roche.

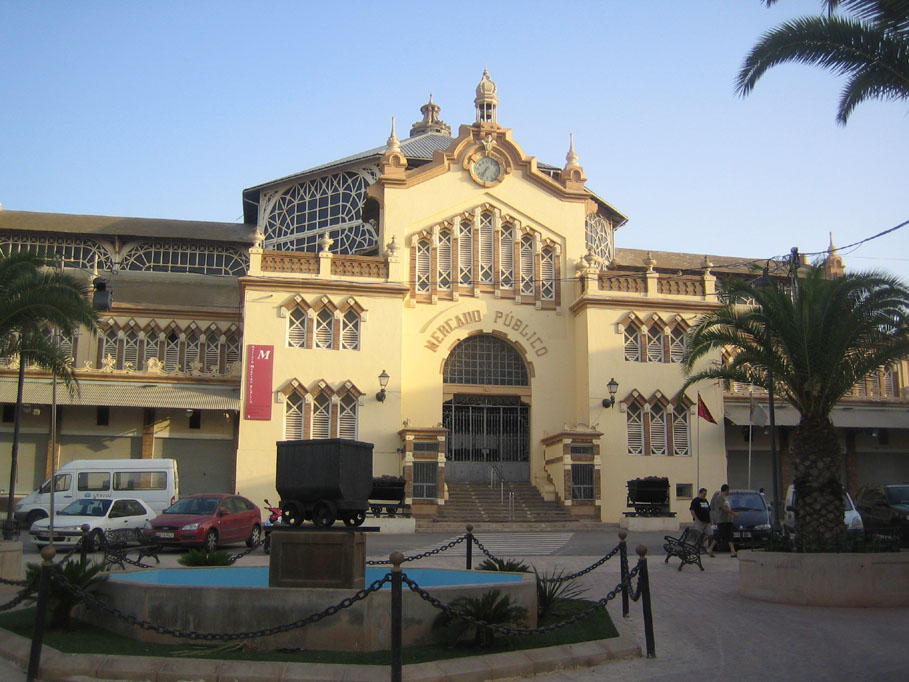
Building for the former public market in La Unión.

== Main sights ==
- Antiguo Mercado Público de La Unión: The Antiguo Mercado Público de La Unión (building for the former public market) is one of the most prominent Modernist buildings in Región de Murcia. It was built in the year 1907.

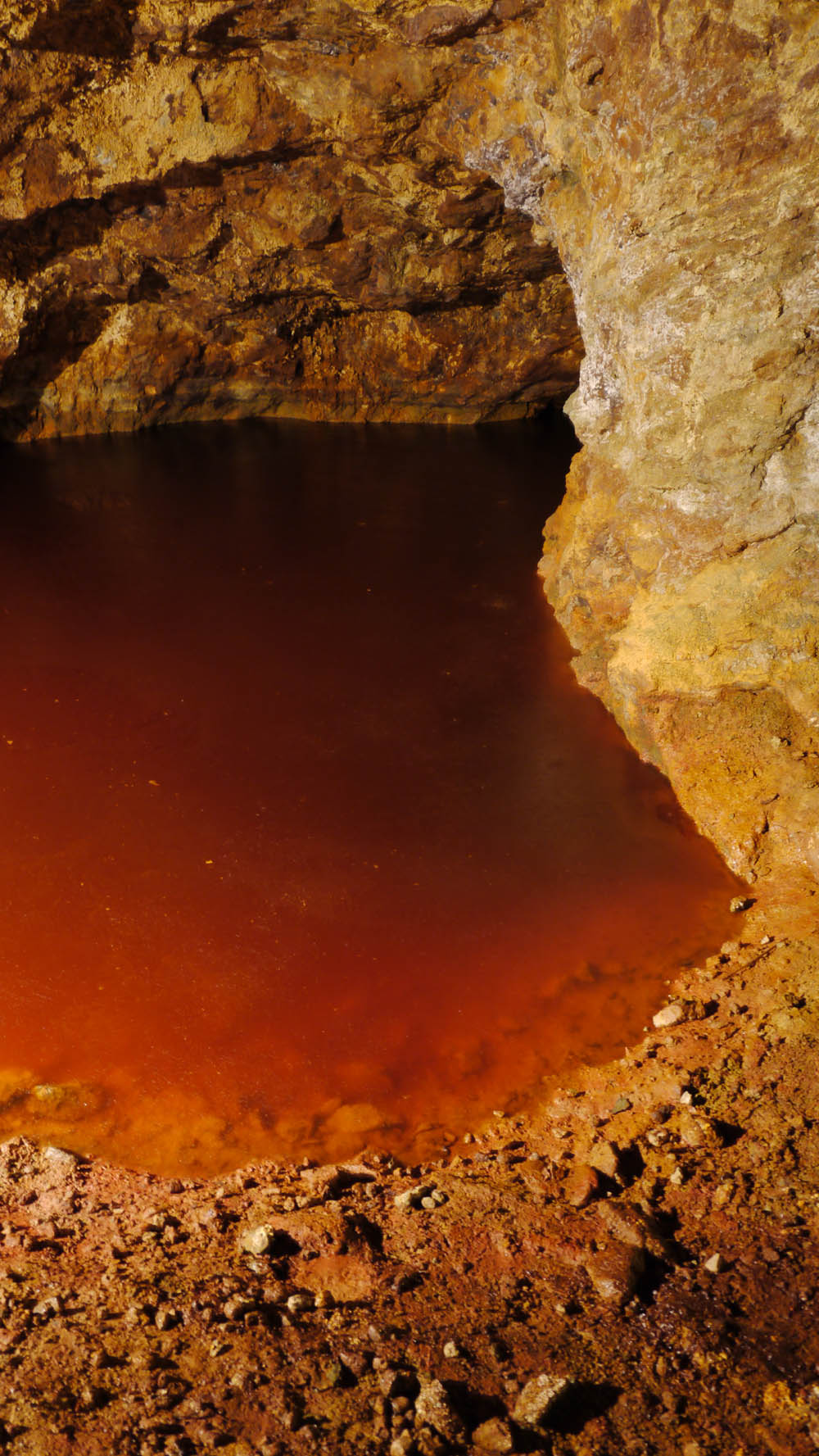
Acid lake in 'Agrupa Vicenta' mine in La Unión (Spain)

- Casa Zapata o del Tío Lobo:This building was built in the year 1913 and it has an Art Nouveau architectural style.
- Liceo del Obrero: It was built in the year 1906.
- Casa del Piñón: This edifice was built in the year 1899 and it is an example of architectural eclecticism in La Unión. The purpose of Casa del Piñón was to be a rental building for families with high purchasing power.
- Villa romana El Paturro: This former construction has two sections, the first was a living area and the second one was an industrial area. This area had two stages. The first one was related to the Roman Late Republican period, dated in the 2nd and 1st centuries BC, and it was a commercial settlement before becoming a mining area. In the 1st century AD, the former mining area became a salting factory.
- Agrupa Vicenta Mine: It was a former mining extraction area and it is currently an musealizated mine. Its purpose was the mining extraction from 1860 to the middle of the 20th century. There is a reddish pond as a result of pyrite action.

== Festivities ==
=== Semana Santa Minera ===
Semana Santa Minera (or Mining Holy Week). includes a Stations of the Cross. with a special feature in the mining region of La Unión that the statue which is carried is about an unconventional version of Christ which is dedicated to the mining and the miners, this is called 'Cristo de los mineros' (Christ of the miners). There are also other processions (organised religious and sometimes festive walkings) such as one that is held on Good Friday (The previous Friday to Eastern Monday) and another one whose name is Procesión del Santo Entierro.

=== Virgen del Rosario Festivity ===
This is held on 7 October. There are some activities that are carried out during the festivity such as amusement rides. Other activities are parades in which people are disguised and floats and carried. There are also dances, concerts and performances during this festive day.

== Notable people ==
- Antonio Grau Mora (1847–1907), flamenco singer
- Juan Pujol Martínez (1883–1968), poet, novelist and journalist
- María Cegarra Salcedo (1899–1993), poet and chemist
- Ramón Perelló (1903-1978), poet and songwriter
- Santos Martínez Saura (1909–1997), writer and politician

== See also ==
- Sierra Minera de Cartagena-La Unión
- List of municipalities in the Region of Murcia

== Sources ==
- SINTAS, E.: "Prospección arqueológica en la Sierra Minera de La Unión", Evolución de la industria metalúrgica en la Región de Murcia, I Jornadas Técnicas, Universidad Politécnica de Cartagena, 1990.
