= Universidad Popular de Cartagena =

Adult education centre in Cartagena, Spain

Popular University of Cartagena
- Universidad Popular de Cartagena
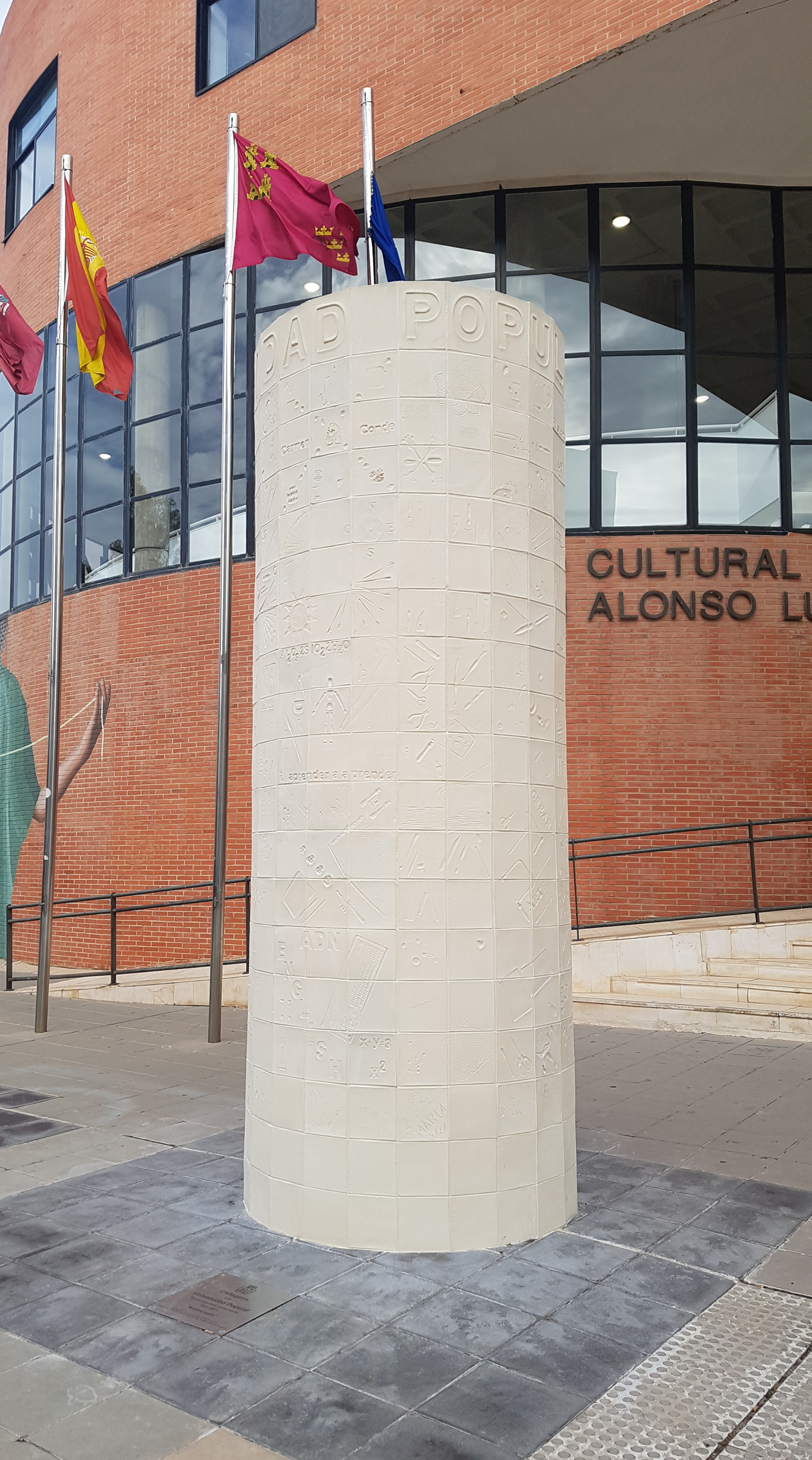
- Other names: UP
- Type: Public
- Established: 1932; 1981
- Director: José Macián Montesinos
- Location: Calle Jacinto Benavente, 7, Cartagena, Region of Murcia, Spain; 37.609667°N 0.978833°W
- Website: up.cartagena.es

The Universidad Popular de Cartagena (English: Popular University of Cartagena) is an adult education center first founded in 1932 in the Spanish city of Cartagena (Region of Murcia).

== History ==
In 1931, following the proclamation of the Second Republic, the new national government set out to improve the educational situation in Spain with a broad program of reforms and initiatives, including the Misiones Pedagógicas and La Barraca. Wishing to collaborate in this effort, the poets Carmen Conde and Antonio Oliver decided to set up a popular university in their hometown, an institution well-established in France but which had not yet taken root in Spain. The idea materialised with the opening of the centre on 10 March 1932, with the stated aim of promoting the literacy of the population through free classes and the programming of cultural events.

The UP's board of directors included both poets, Ginés de Arlés García, Manuel Mas Gilabert and Antonio Puig Campillo, who served as president. Funding came from the Cartagena City Council, as well as from private individuals such as the physician Luis Calandre, who in 1935 was granted the title of honorary president in recognition of his financial and teaching collaboration.

The university maintained a close relationship with the Patronato de Misiones Pedagógicas, which resulted in the inaugural mission in the province of Murcia consisting of a joint teaching project in which the team sent by the Patronato, composed of Matilde Moliner Ruiz, Pablo de Andrés Cobos and Antonio Sánchez Barbudo, departed from the headquarters of the Cartagena institution accompanied by Conde and Oliver, travelling between 26 March and 1 April 1933 to the towns of Cabo de Palos, Fuente Álamo de Murcia and Zarcilla de Ramos. This was followed by more expeditions and visits by illustrious personalities, such as the presentation on 28 January 1933 of Perito en lunas, the first book published by Miguel Hernández, which was also attended by his patron Ramón Sijé. The outbreak of the Spanish Civil War, however, interrupted all the centre's activities, including the publication of the centre's official bulletin, Presencia. Cuaderno de afirmación de la Universidad Popular.

In 1981, the UP was refounded, with the support of the cultural association Abraxas and under the auspices of the municipal government of the democratically elected Enrique Escudero de Castro. In this second period, the Cartagena institution was the first of its kind to become operational in the Region of Murcia, and in 1984, together with the others, it established a technical coordination that was given official status at the regional meeting held the following year.

== Bibliography ==
- Rodríguez Cánovas, José (1978). Antonio Oliver Belmás y la Universidad Popular de Cartagena [Antonio Oliver Belmás and the Popular University of Cartagena] (2nd ed.). Madrid: Molegar. ISBN 84-300-0057-7.
