= Antonio Oliver =

Spanish writer and historian (1903–1968)

Antonio Oliver Belmás (Cartagena, 29 January 1903 – 28 July 1968) was a Spanish writer, poet, literary critic, historian of Spanish art, and telegraphist.

In 1931, he married the poet Carmen Conde. The couple formed part of the Generation of '27, a group of artists and poets that specialized in the avant-garde. Together they became involved in organising the Universidad Popular de Cartagena, or People's University, set up for the education of working men and women on behalf of the republican government. After the outbreak of the Spanish Civil War, Belmás joined the republican army and worked on the Popular Front Radio.

After the war, Belmás taught Latin American literature at the University of Madrid. In 1962, the Nicaraguan State University awarded him an honorary degree for his work on Rubén Darío.

He died in 1968.

The Antonio Oliver Belmás International Poetry Award is named in his honour.

== Work ==
- Mast, 1925
- Saved Crying
- Andrew Knight Talks
- Book of Loas, 1947
- From Cervantes to Poetry, 1944
- Don Luis de Gongora, 1963
- Life and Work of Lope de Vega
- Garcilaso de la Vega, 1965
- Garcilaso, Captain and Poet
- Dying but no fear
- This other Rubén Darío
- 1900-1950. Half a Century of Artists Murcianos, 1952.
