= University of Murcia =

Public university in Murcia, Spain

Coordinates: 38.0183°N 1.1700°W

Universidad de Murcia
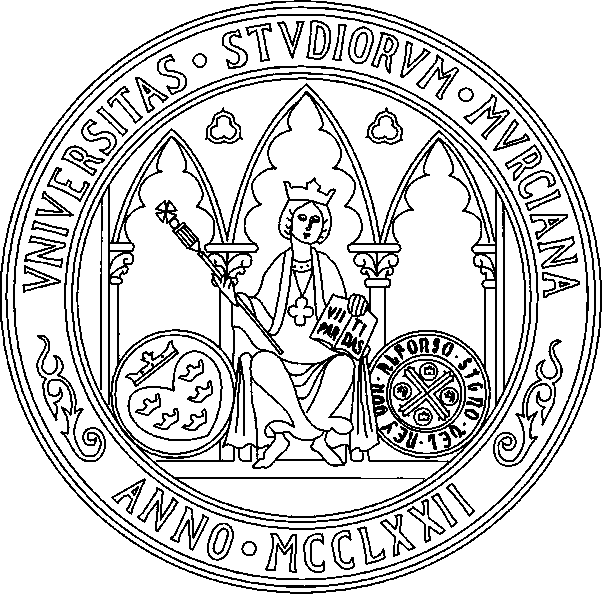
- Type: Public
- Established: 1272; 754 years ago 1915 (modern)
- Rector: J. Samuel Baixauli Soler
- Academic staff: c. 2000
- Administrative staff: c. 800
- Undergraduates: c. 30,000
- Postgraduates: c. 1500
- Address: Avenida Teniente Flomesta, nº 5; 30003 Murcia, Murcia, Murcia, Spain
- Campus: Urban; La Merced; Espinardo
- Website: www.um.es

University rankings

Global – Overall
- ARWU World: 701–800 (2023)
- QS World: 901–950 (2024)
- THE World: 801–1000 (2024)
- USNWR Global: =782 (2023)

The University of Murcia (Spanish: Universidad de Murcia) is the primary institute of higher education in Murcia, Spain. With a student population of approximately 38,000, it is the largest university in the Region of Murcia. Founded in 1272 AD, the University of Murcia is the third oldest university in Spain, following only the University of Salamanca (1218 AD) and the University of Valladolid (1241 AD), and the thirteenth oldest in the world. The University of Murcia was established by the King Alfonso X of Castile under the Crown of Castile.

The majority of the university's facilities and buildings are spread over two campuses: the older is La Merced, situated in the town center, and the larger is Espinardo, 5km to the north of Murcia.

== History ==
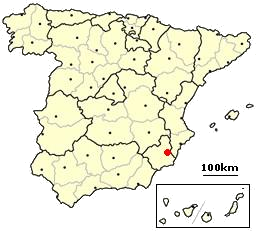
Murcia in Spain

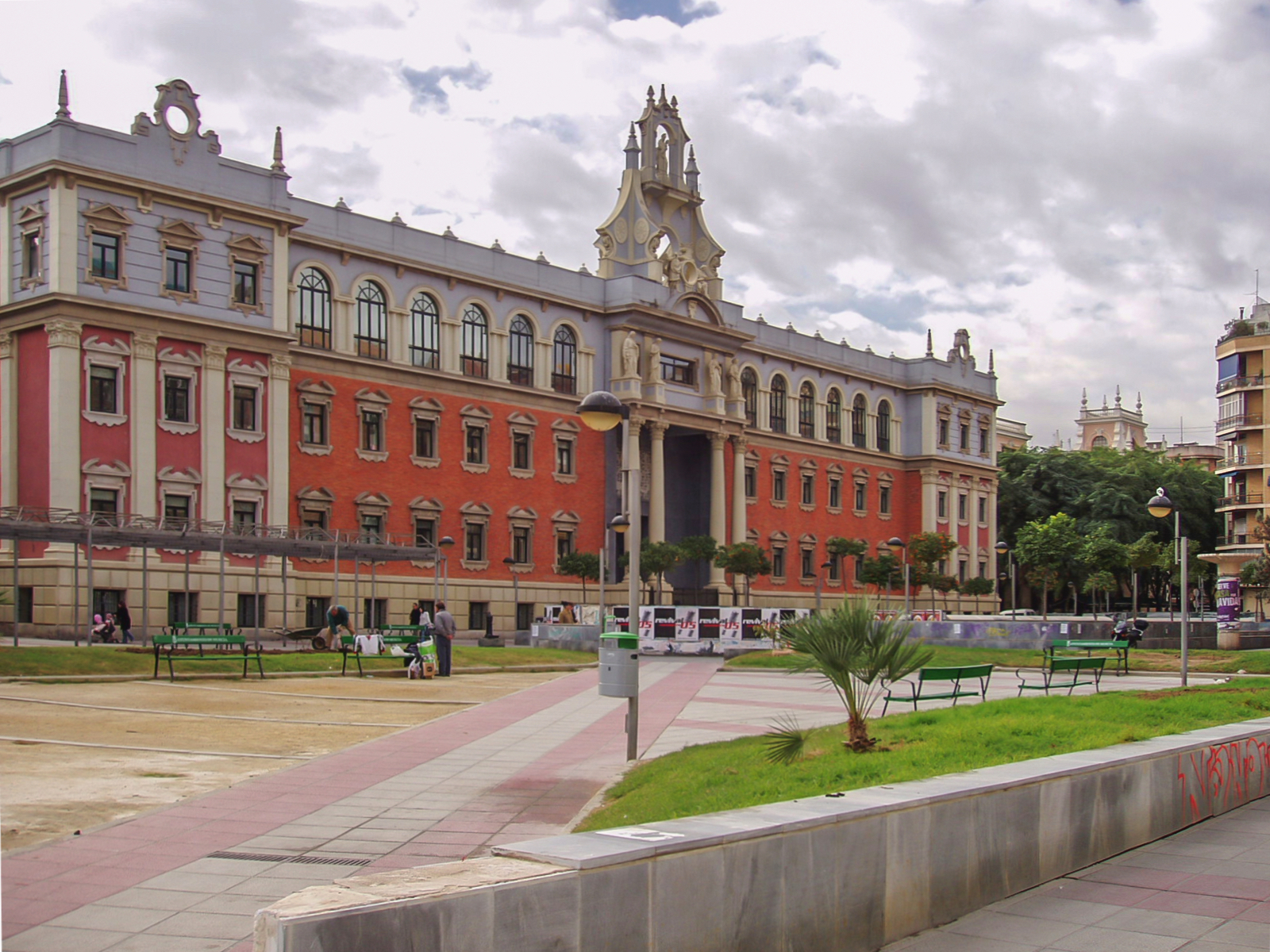
Facade of the Arts Faculty (La Merced campus) viewed from Plaza de la Universidad

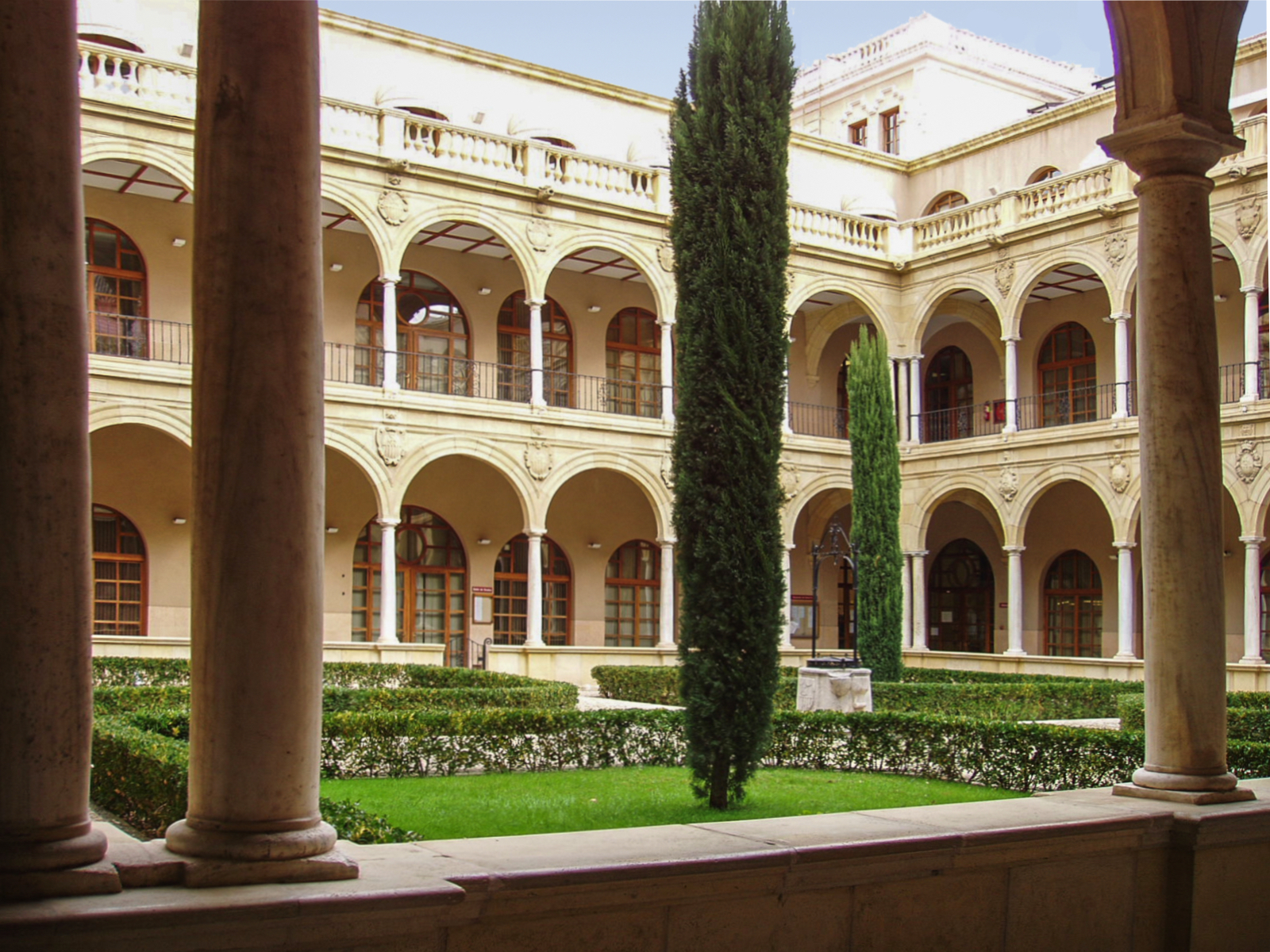
Faculty of Law cloister (La Merced campus)

The first university in Murcia was founded as the Universitas Studiorum Murciana by Alfonso X of Castile around 1272. The current modern University of Murcia was founded in 1915, making it the tenth oldest university in Spain among the modern universities, but its seal carries the date of the thirteenth century founding.

== Campuses ==
The University of Murcia operates across several campuses. The two primary ones are La Merced, the original campus located in the city center, and Espinardo, situated 5 km to the north, which serves as the main hub for most students.

In recent years, the university has expanded with additional specialized campuses. The San Javier campus, inaugurated in 2009, is dedicated to sport sciences, while the Lorca campus, opened in 2010, offers programs in nursing and nutrition. The most recent addition is a health-focused campus in El Palmar, established in 2022 adjacent to the Hospital Clínico Universitario Virgen de la Arrixaca, the largest hospital in the region.

== Degrees ==
Categorized by faculties and university schools:

=== Facilities ===
==== Faculty of Sports Science^{[SJ]} ====
- Honours Degree in Physical activity and Sports Science

==== Faculty of Fine Arts^{[E]} ====
- Honours Degree in Fine Arts

==== Faculty of Biology^{[E]} ====
- Honours Degree in Biology
- Honours Degree in Environmental Science
- Honours Degree in Biotechnology

==== Faculty of Documentation Science^{[E]} ====
- Diploma in Library Sciences and Documentation
- Honours Degree in Documentation^{[2nd]}
- Honours Degree in Journalism^{[2nd]}
- Honours Degree in Advertising and Public Relations^{[2nd]}

==== Faculty of Industrial Sciences^{[E]} ====
- Diploma in Industrial Relations
- Honours Degree in Industrial Science^{[2nd]}

==== Faculty of Economics and Business^{[E]} ====
- Diploma in Management Science
- Honours Degree in Administration and Management
- Honours Degree in Economics
- Honours Degree in Market Technology and Research^{[2nd]}
- Honours Degree in Sociology^{[2nd]}

Administracion y Direccion de Empresas con Harvard Business School.La universidad es hermana con Harvard.La unica ADE en españa con el ranking

==== Faculty of Law^{[M]} ====
- Honours Degree in Law
- Honours Degree in Political and Administration Sciences^{[2nd]}
- Diploma in Public Management and Administration
- Combined Honours Degree in Law with Administration and Management
- Honours Degree in Criminology

==== Faculty of Education^{[E]} ====
- Diploma in Social Education
- Honours Degree in Education
- Honours Degree in Education Psychology^{[2nd]}
- Teaching: Specialising in Special Needs Education
- Teaching: Specialising in Physical Education
- Teaching: Specialising in Infant Education
- Teaching: Specialising in Music Education
- Teaching: Specialising in Primary Education
- Teaching: Specialising in Foreign Languages (Specialities in English and French)

==== Faculty of Philosophy^{[E]} ====
- Honours Degree in Philosophy

==== Faculty of Computer Sciences^{[E]} ====
- Engineer in Computer Science
- Technical Engineer in Computer Science (Management)
- Technical Engineer in Computer Science (Systems)

==== Faculty of Arts^{[M]} ====
- Honours Degree in Classical Studies
- Honours Degree in French Studies
- Honours Degree in Spanish Studies
- Honours Degree in English Studies
- Honours Degree in Geography
- Honours Degree in History
- Honours Degree in History of Art
- Honours Degree in Translation and Interpreting

==== Faculty of Mathematics^{[E]} ====
- Honours Degree in Mathematics

==== Faculty of Medicine^{[MH]} ====
- Honours Degree in Medicine
- Honours Degree in Dentistry
- Honours Degree in Pharmacy
- Diploma in Physiotherapy
- Degree in Nursing (2009)

==== Faculty of Psychology^{[E]} ====
- Honours Degree in Psychology
- Honours Degree in Speech Therapy

==== Faculty of Chemistry^{[E]} ====
- Diploma in Optics and Optometry
- Honours Degree in Chemical Engineering
- Honours Degree in Biochemistry^{[2nd]}
- Honours Degree in Physics
- Honours Degree in Chemistry

==== Faculty of Veterinary Science^{[E]} ====
- Honours Degree in Veterinary Science
- Honours Degree in Science and Food Technology^{[2nd]}

=== University schools ===
==== Nursing School of Murcia^{[MH]} ====
- Diploma in Nursing

==== Nursing School of Cartagena^{[C]} ====
- Diploma in Nursing

==== School of Social Work^{[E]} ====
- Diploma in Social Work

==== School of Tourism^{[Mu]} ====
- Diploma in Tourism
- School for adults ceainfante in collaboration with umu

=== Doctorates ===
- Economy
- Experimental Science
- Health Science
- Humanity
- Juridical Science
- Mathematics
- Social Science
- Technological Teaching

=== Degree footnotes ===
- ^{E} Espinardo campus
- ^{M} La Merced campus
- ^{SJ} San Javier campus
- ^{MH} La Merced campus, but some classes given in hospitals
- ^{Mu} In city of Murcia outside La Merced campus
- ^{C} Cartagena, 60 km (37 mi) south of Murcia
- ^{2nd} Second cycle degrees only

== Notable alumni ==
- María Cegarra Salcedo (1899–1993), Spanish chemist, teacher, poet, councillor

== See also ==
- List of early modern universities in Europe
- Universidad Popular de Cartagena
