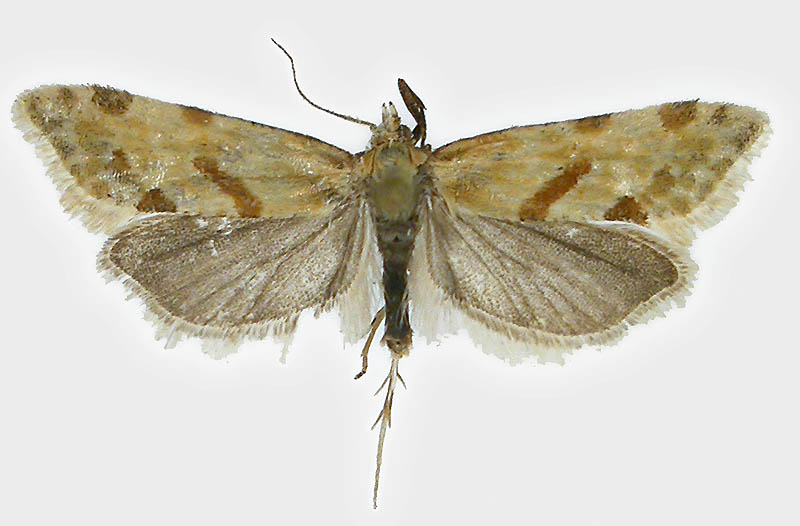

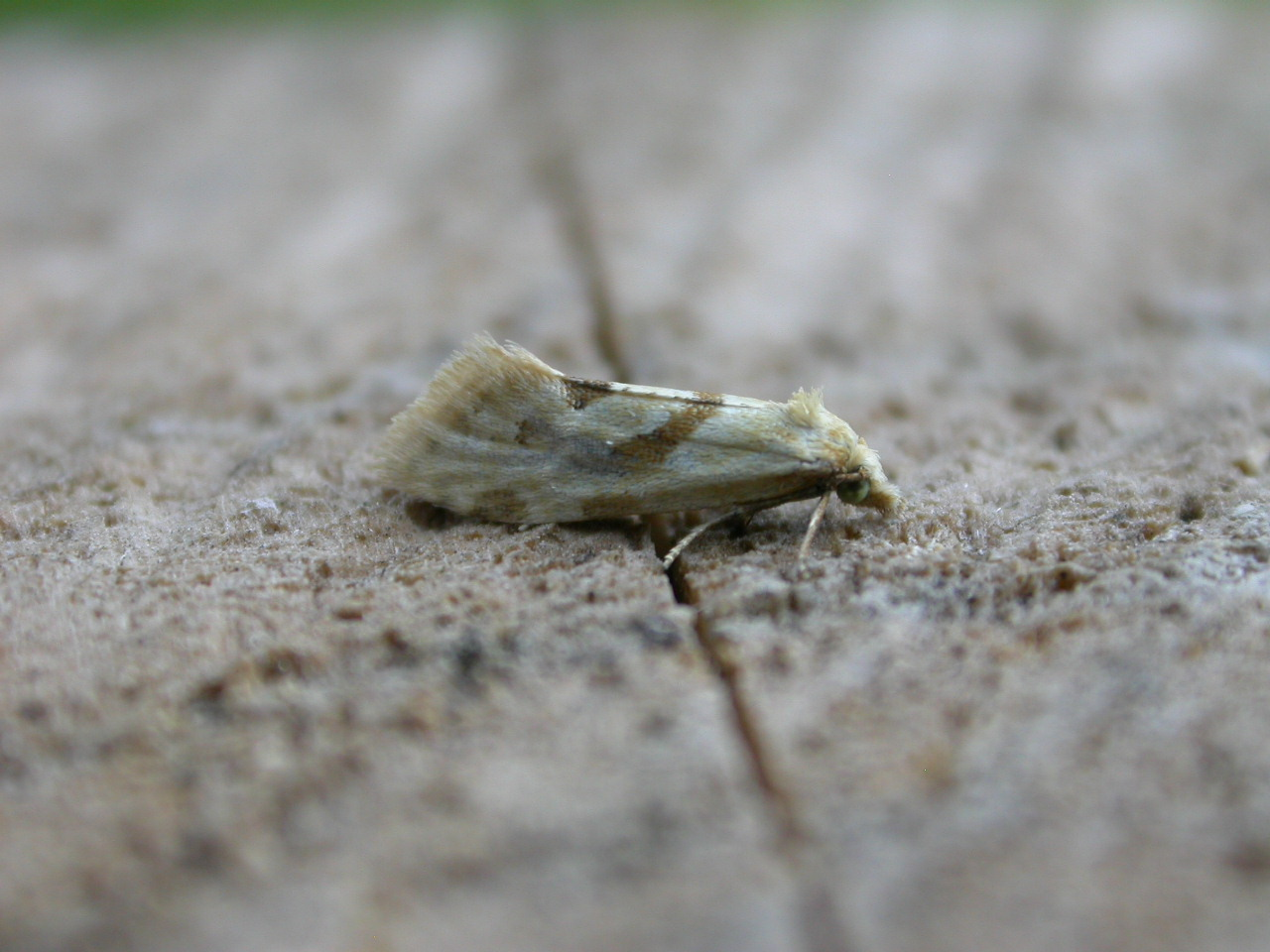

Scientific classification
- Domain: Eukaryota
- Kingdom: Animalia
- Phylum: Arthropoda
- Class: Insecta
- Order: Lepidoptera
- Family: Tortricidae
- Genus: Aethes
- Species: A. smeathmanniana

Binomial name
- Aethes smeathmanniana (Fabricius, 1781)

Synonyms
- Pyralis smeathmanniana Fabricius, 1781; Conchylis smeathmanniana ab. achromata Skala, 1936; Cochylis biviana Duponchel, in Godart, 1842; Tortrix fabricana Hubner, [1796-1799]; Phalonia smeathmanniana f. obsoletella Dufrane, 1955; Conchylis scissana Walker, 1863; Tortrix (Cochylis) stachydana Herrich-Schäffer, 1851; Phalonia smeathmanniana f. superbella Dufrane, 1955

= Aethes smeathmanniana =

Smeathmann's aethes moth

Species of moth

Aethes smeathmanniana, or Smeathmann's aethes moth, is a moth of the family Tortricidae. It was described by Johan Christian Fabricius in 1781. It is found in most of Europe, Asia Minor and in North America, where it has been recorded from New Jersey and Newfoundland and Labrador.

The wingspan is 12–19 millimetres (0.47–0.75 in). Adults are on wing from May to August.

The larvae feed on the seeds of various plants, including Achillea millefolium and Centaurea species. Other recorded food plants include Anthemis cotula, Centaurea nigra and Lactuca sativa.
