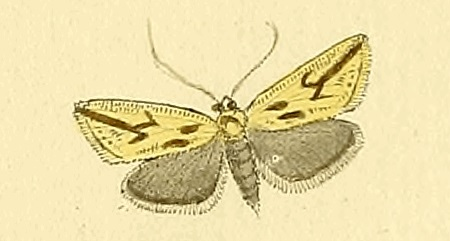

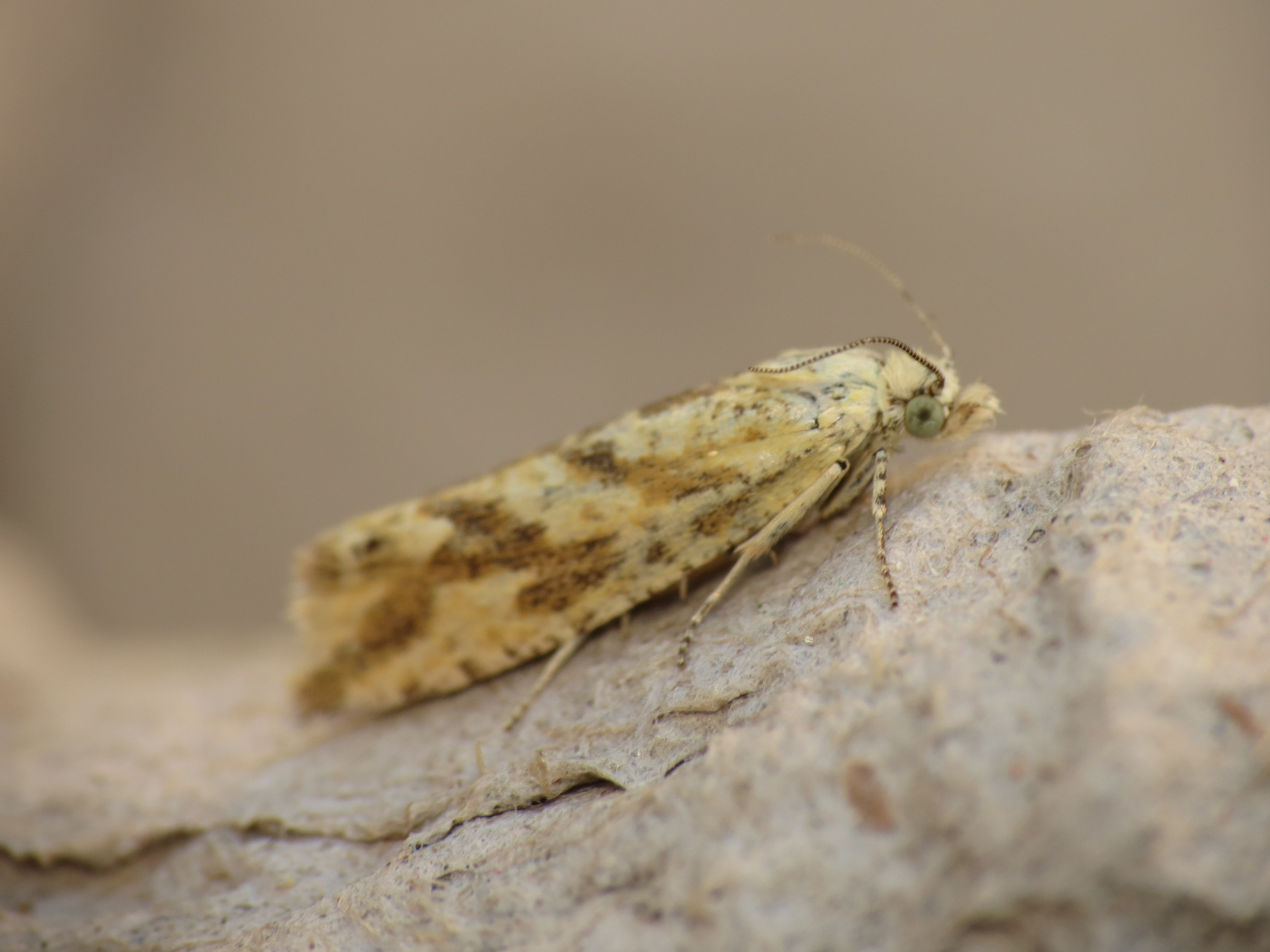

Scientific classification
- Kingdom: Animalia
- Phylum: Arthropoda
- Clade: Pancrustacea
- Class: Insecta
- Order: Lepidoptera
- Family: Tortricidae
- Genus: Thiodia
- Species: T. citrana

Binomial name
- Thiodia citrana (Hübner, 1796-1799)

Synonyms
- Tortrix citrana Hübner, 1796-1799; Thiodia citrana libanicolana Obraztsov, 1964

= Thiodia citrana =

Species of moth

Thiodia citrana, the lemon bell, is a species of moth of the family Tortricidae. It is found in China (Hebei, Xinjiang), Japan, Iran, Asia Minor, Turkmenistan, Russia, Kazakhstan, North Africa and Europe. The habitat consists of rough grasslands and dry pastures.

The wingspan is 16–21 mm. It can be reminiscent of some species in the group Cochylini, but it is not related to these. The palpi are relatively large and protrude in front of the head like a short beak. The forewings are slightly pointed, pale yellow on colour, with small black cross spots along the costal edge. This wing has brownish marks consisting of two bevels and a wide line against the wing tip. The hindwings are light brown, pale at the base.

Adults are on wing from June to September in western Europe.

The larvae feed on Achillea millefolium, Artemisia campestris, Artemisia vulgaris, Tanacetum vulgare and Anthemis cotula. They feed on the flowerheads of their host plant from within a spinning (a shelter like the web of a spider).
