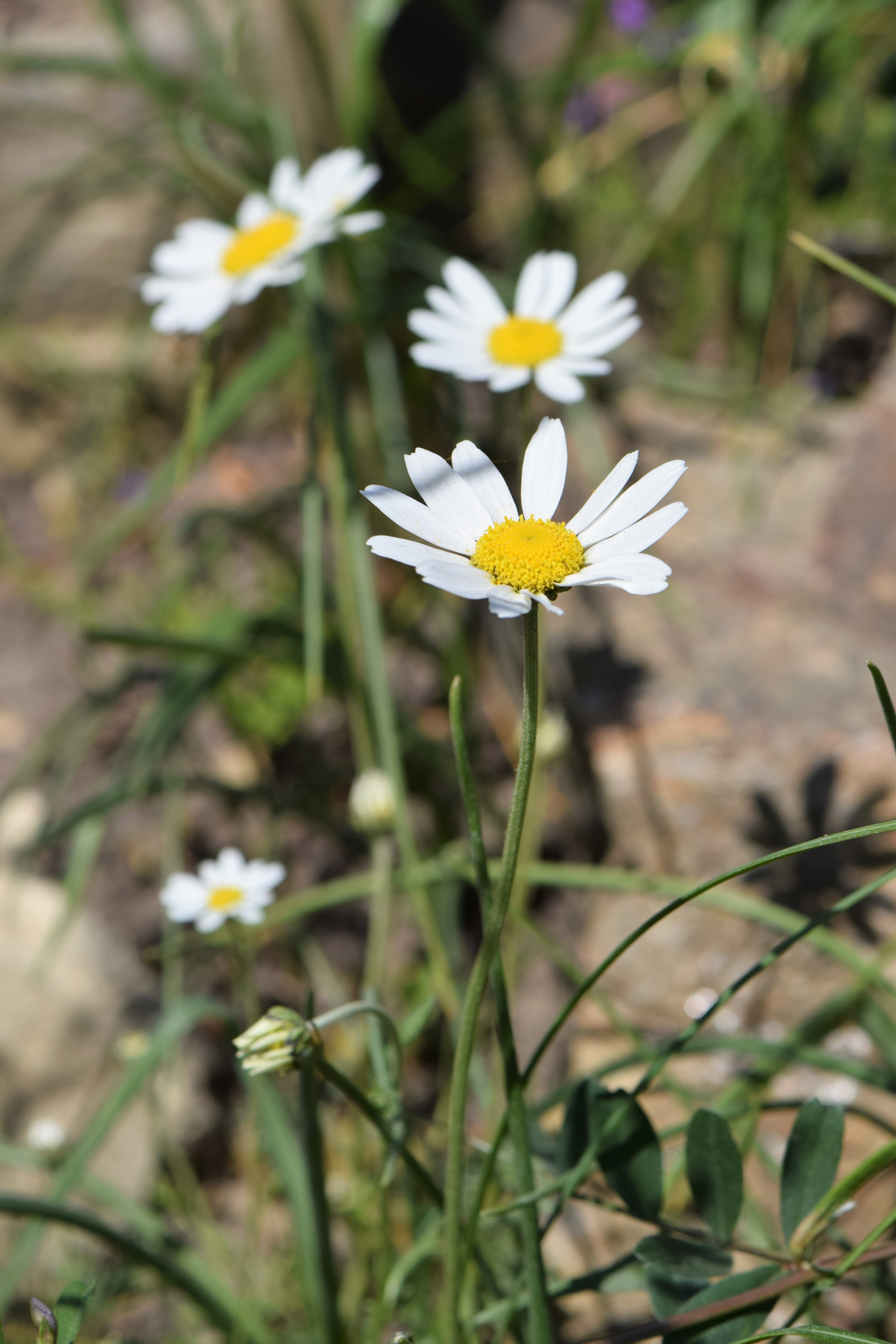
- At Berlin Botanical Garden

Scientific classification
- Kingdom: Plantae
- Clade: Tracheophytes
- Clade: Angiosperms
- Clade: Eudicots
- Clade: Asterids
- Order: Asterales
- Family: Asteraceae
- Genus: Anthemis
- Species: A. cretica
- Subspecies: A. c. subsp. carpatica

Trinomial name
- Anthemis cretica subsp. carpatica (Waldst. & Kit. ex Willd.) Grierson

Synonyms
- Anthemis carpatica Waldst. & Kit. ex Willd.

= Anthemis cretica subsp. carpatica =

Species of flowering plant

Anthemis cretica subsp. carpatica, the snow carpet, is a subspecies of flowering plant in the genus Anthemis and in the family Asteraceae. It may also be treated as a full species, Anthemis carpatica.
