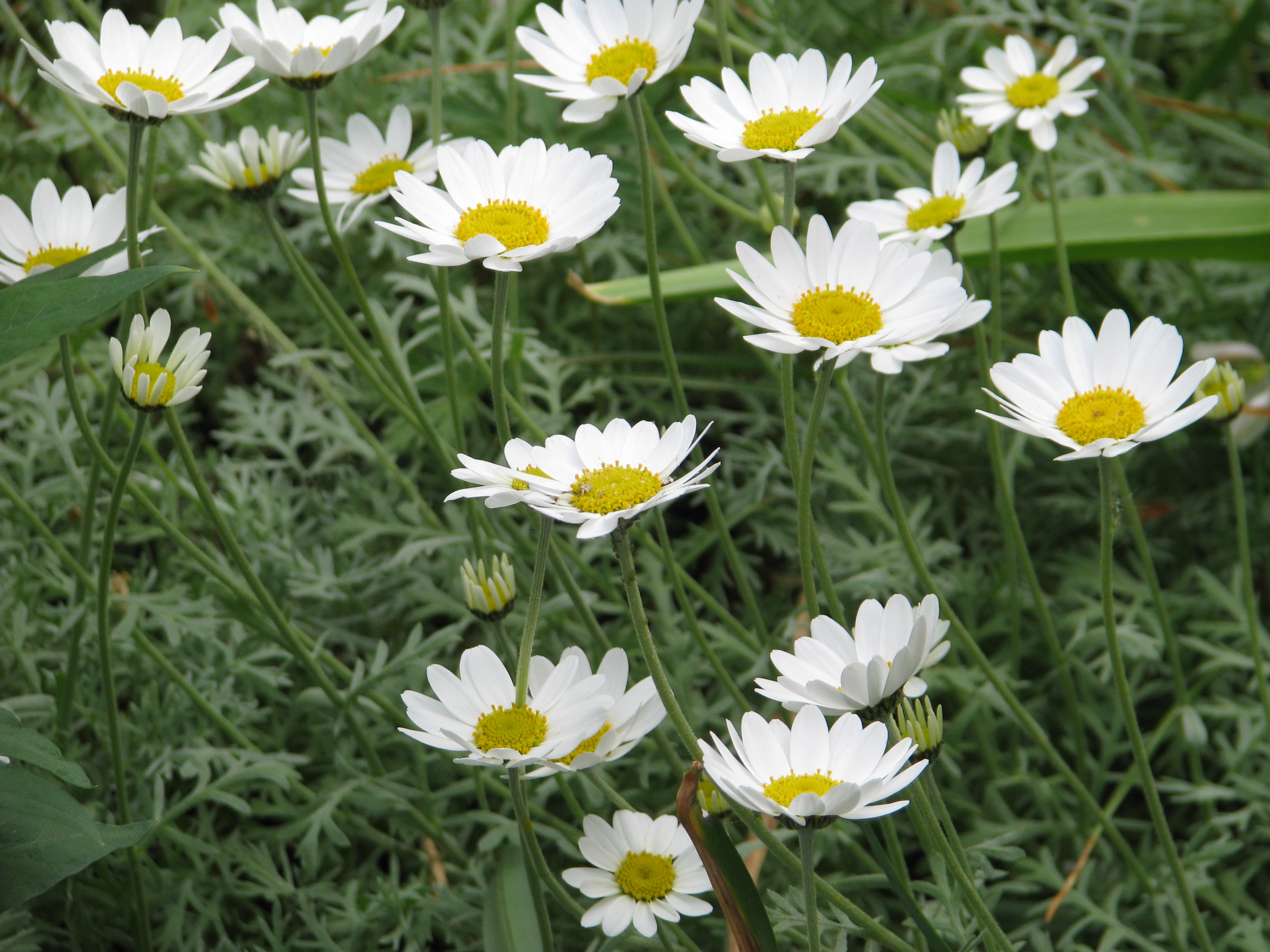
- In bloom

Scientific classification
- Kingdom: Plantae
- Clade: Tracheophytes
- Clade: Angiosperms
- Clade: Eudicots
- Clade: Asterids
- Order: Asterales
- Family: Asteraceae
- Genus: Anthemis
- Species: A. punctata

Binomial name
- Anthemis punctata Vahl

Synonyms
- Anthemis kabylica Batt. & Trab.

= Anthemis punctata =

Species of flowering plant

Anthemis punctata is a species of flowering plant in the genus Anthemis, native to Algeria and Tunisia. The Royal Horticultural Society has given the Award of Garden Merit to a plant native to Sicily it calls Anthemis punctata subsp. cupaniana. As of August 2024, Plants of the World Online treated this as a separate species, Anthemis cupaniana.

== Subspecies ==
The following subspecies were accepted as of August 2024:

- Anthemis punctata subsp. kabylica (Batt.) Oberpr.
- Anthemis punctata subsp. punctata
