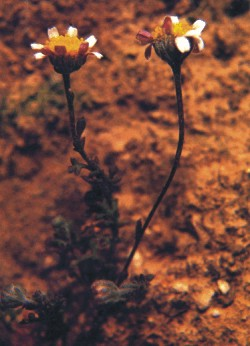

Conservation status
- Critically Endangered (IUCN 3.1)

Scientific classification
- Kingdom: Plantae
- Clade: Tracheophytes
- Clade: Angiosperms
- Clade: Eudicots
- Clade: Asterids
- Order: Asterales
- Family: Asteraceae
- Genus: Anthemis
- Species: A. glaberrima

Binomial name
- Anthemis glaberrima (Rech.f.) Greuter

Synonyms
- Ammanthus glaberrimus Rech.f.

= Anthemis glaberrima =

Species of flowering plant

Anthemis glaberrima is a species of flowering plant in the family Asteraceae. It is found only on the islets of Agria Gramvousa and Imeri Gramvousa, near the northwestern tip of the island of Crete in Greece. Its natural habitats are rocky shores and Mediterranean-type shrubby vegetation (known as phrygana in Greece).

In 1992 it was designated as a 'priority species' under Annex II of the Habitats Directive of the European Community (which was reformed as the European Union the following year). This designation was meant to serve as the basis for Greece to declare which areas in which it occurs are 'Special Areas of Conservation' -which were to form the backbone of the Natura 2000 network, but only if these areas include one of the number of habitats listed in Annex I of the directive.
