= Anthemis aaronsohnii =

Scientific classification
- Kingdom: Plantae
- Clade: Tracheophytes
- Clade: Angiosperms
- Clade: Eudicots
- Clade: Asterids
- Order: Asterales
- Family: Asteraceae
- Genus: Anthemis
- Species: A. aaronsohnii

Binomial name
- Anthemis aaronsohnii Eig

Species of plant

Anthemis aaronsohnii is a member of the daisy family and is found in Lebanon and Syria.
