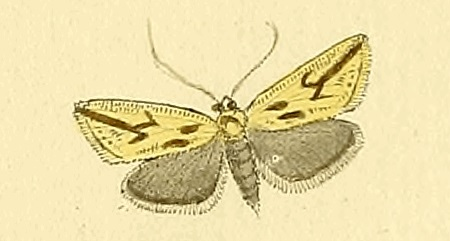
- Thiodia citrana

Scientific classification
- Domain: Eukaryota
- Kingdom: Animalia
- Phylum: Arthropoda
- Class: Insecta
- Order: Lepidoptera
- Family: Tortricidae
- Tribe: Eucosmini
- Genus: Thiodia; Hübner, [1825]

= Thiodia =

Genus of tortrix moths

Thiodia is a genus of moths belonging to the subfamily Olethreutinae of the family Tortricidae.

== Species ==
- Thiodia anatoliana Kennel, 1916
- Thiodia caradjana Kennel, 1916
- Thiodia citrana (Hübner, [1796-1799])
- Thiodia confusana Kuznetzov, 1973
- Thiodia couleruana (Duponchel, in Godart, 1835)
- Thiodia dahurica (Falkovitsh, 1965)
- Thiodia densistriata (Falkovitsh, 1964)
- Thiodia elbursica Kuznetzov, 1973
- Thiodia excavana Aarvik, 2004
- Thiodia fessana (Mann, 1873)
- Thiodia glandulosana Walsingham, 1907
- Thiodia hyrcana Kuznetzov, 1976
- Thiodia irinae Budashkin, 1990
- Thiodia lerneana (Treitschke, 1835)
- Thiodia major (Rebel, 1903)
- Thiodia placidana (Staudinger, 1871)
- Thiodia sulphurana (Christoph, 1888)
- Thiodia torridana (Lederer, 1859)
- Thiodia trochillana (Frolich, 1828)
- Thiodia tscheliana (Caradja, 1927)

== See also ==
- List of Tortricidae genera
