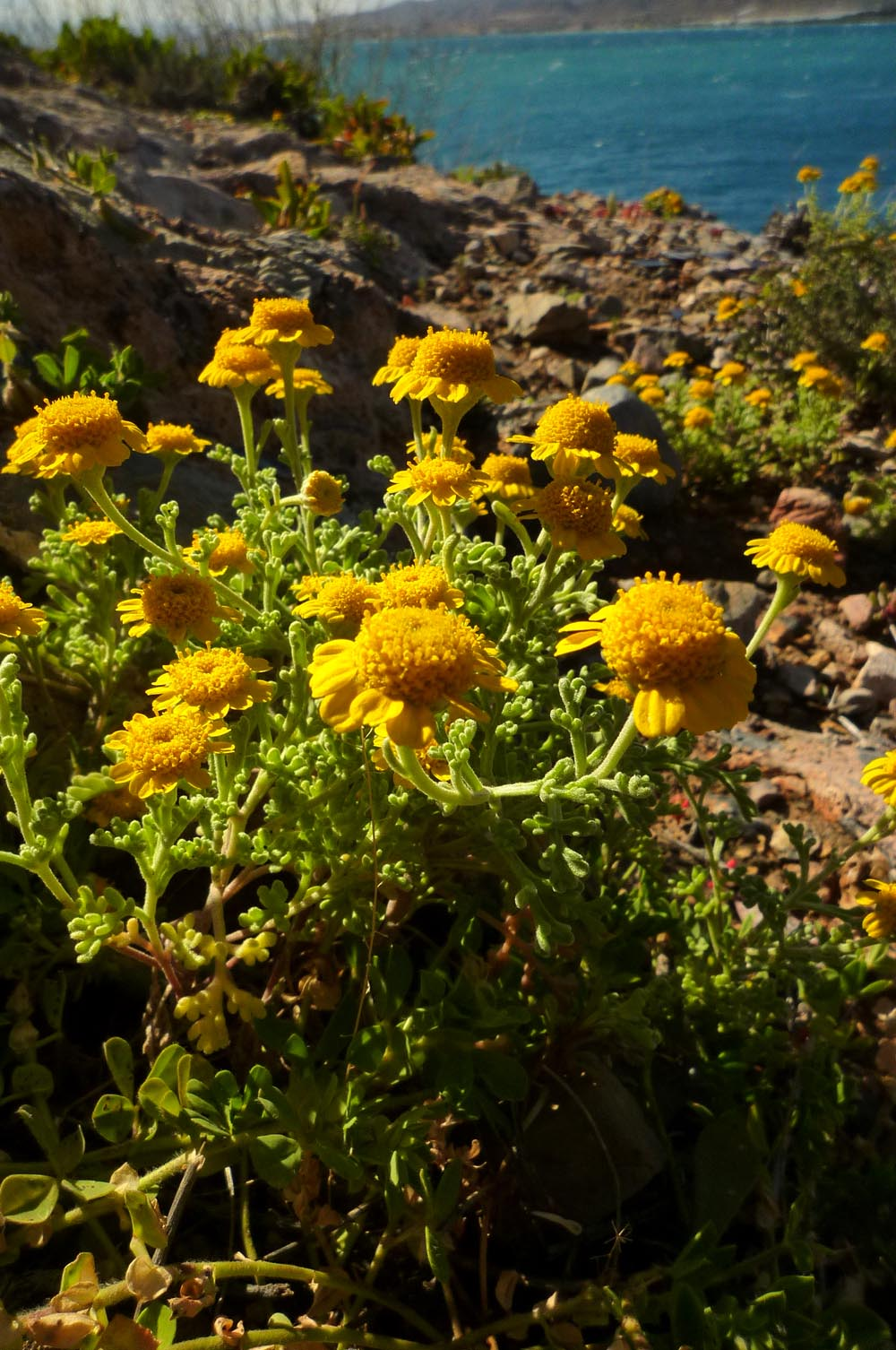
- in La Azohía, Cartagena, Spain.

Conservation status
- Critically Endangered (IUCN 3.1)

Scientific classification
- Kingdom: Plantae
- Clade: Tracheophytes
- Clade: Angiosperms
- Clade: Eudicots
- Clade: Asterids
- Order: Asterales
- Family: Asteraceae
- Genus: Anthemis
- Species: A. chrysantha

Binomial name
- Anthemis chrysantha J.Gay
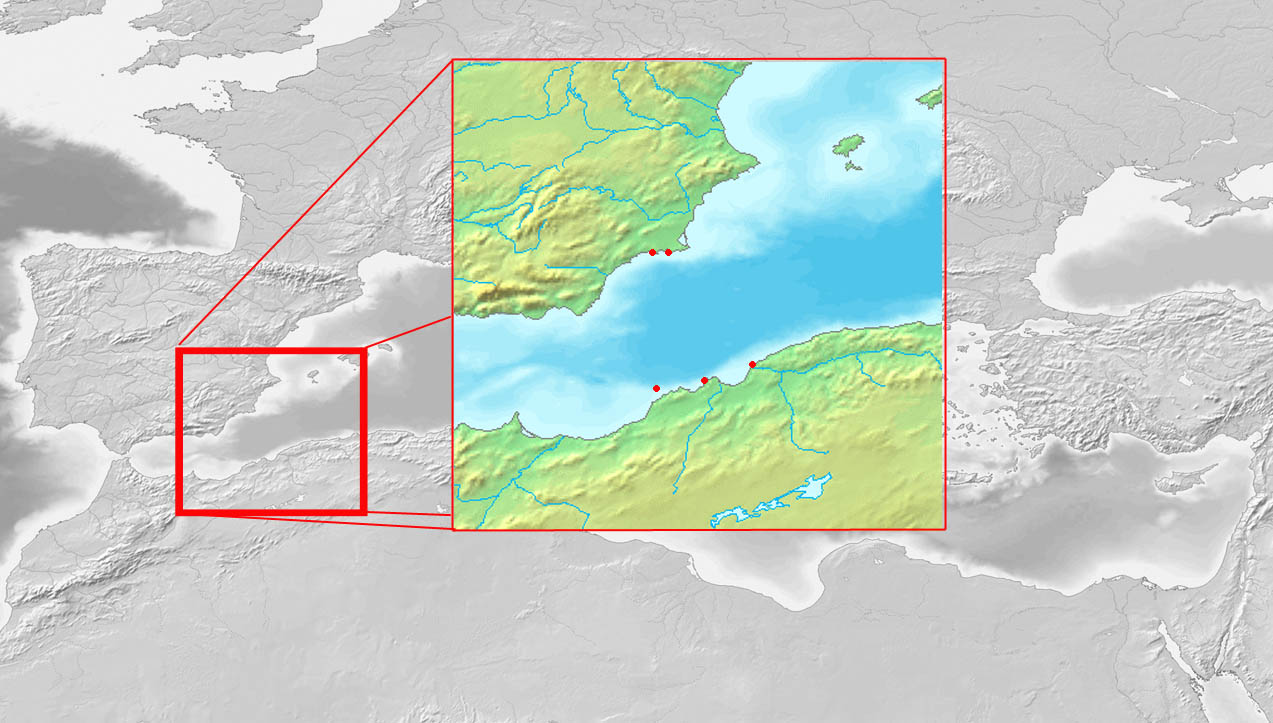

Synonyms
- Anthemis chrysantha subsp. jimenezii (Pau) Sánchez-Gómez, M.A.Carrión & A.Hern.; Anthemis jimenezii Pau; Anthemis ximenezii Pau

= Anthemis chrysantha =

Species of flowering plant

Anthemis chrysantha (known in Spanish as manzanilla de Escombreras or "Escombreras chamomile") is an Ibero-North African annual asteraceae endemism present in a few Cartagenan and Algerian islets and coastal locations.

Researchers have observed enough differences between the Spanish and Algerian populations so as to conclude that they are separate subspecies.

The plant was described by Jacques Etienne Gay.

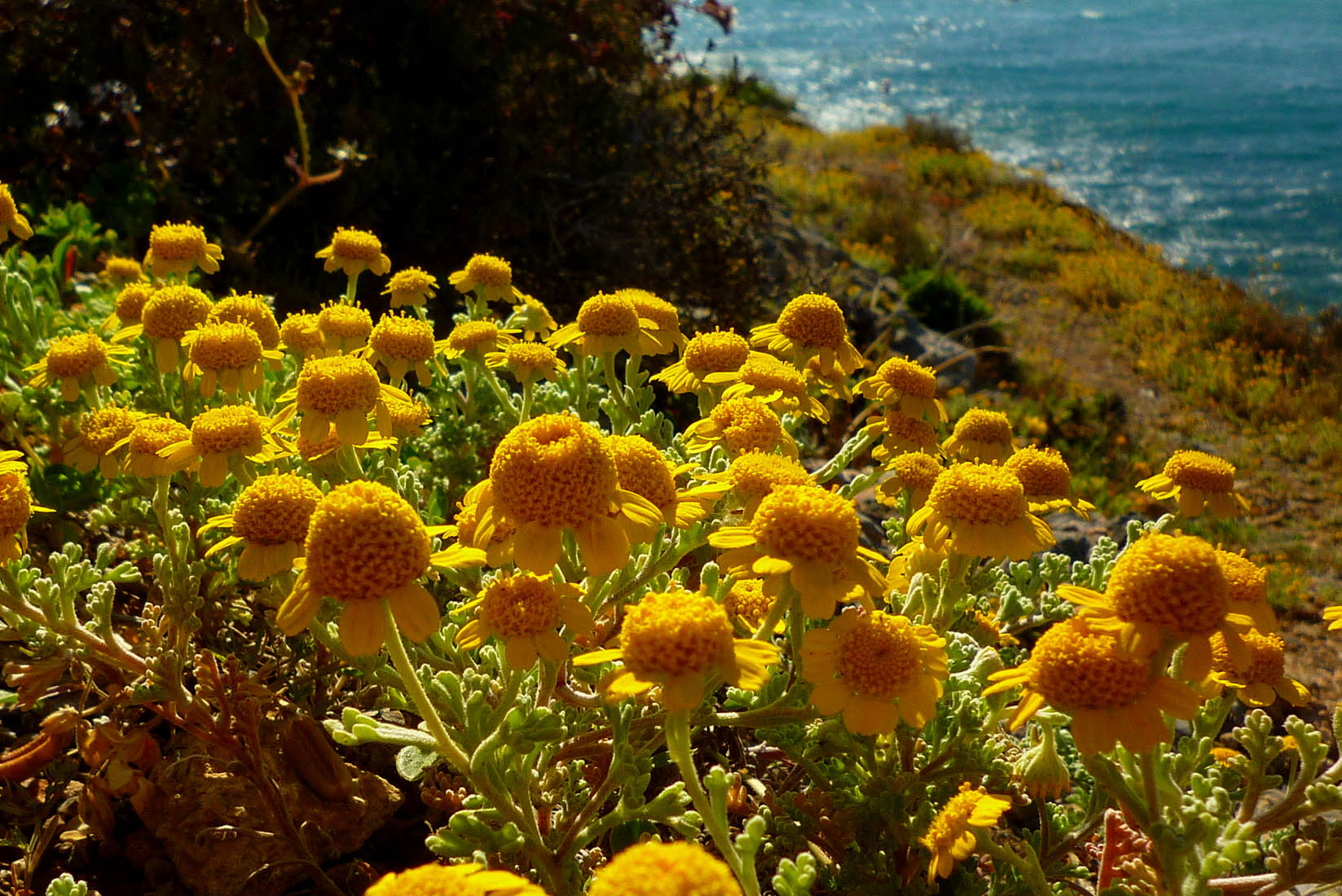
In La Azohía.

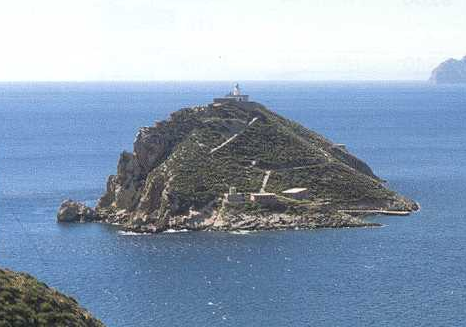
Escombreras islet is the origin of the species' Spanish name

== Distribution in Spain ==
Historically the plant was present in four Spanish locations, all within Cartagena's municipality. Currently, the situation is as follows:

- Escombreras' islet population at the mouth of Cartagena's port (about 12,000 ex. concentrated in just 0,002 square kilometres).
- La Azohía's point, in Mazarrón's bay (about 40,000 ex. in just 0,01 square kilometres)
- Track has been lost of a third population described in 1996 in Sierra de la Muela (la Muela range).
- The population present at Aguilones' point in the Fausilla range disappeared as a result of the enlargement of Cartagena's port. It was recovered in 2015 thanks to a plan sponsored by Cartagena's Port Authority (CPA), Cartagena's Politechnical University and the Fundación Biodiversidad. Funding was provided by the Spanish Ministry of Agriculture and the CPA.
- As a part of the recovery plan mentioned above, two new populations were created in Cala del Bolete Grande and la Algamela Chica.

== Distribution in Algeria ==
In Algeria the plant is present in:

- Habibas islands, off Oran's coast.
- certain coastal locations around Mostaganem.

== Conservation state ==
Despite being somewhat abundant in its restricted distribution area (its average density in Spain is about 5 plants per square metre), the extremely small size of its habitat (its entire Spanish population occupies only 20 lineal kilometres) qualifies for the species being protected as critically endangered in Spain. Its global state has not been ranked yet, but due to the similarly extremely restricted distribution in Algeria, is likely to qualify for globally critically endangered species status.

Its populations in La Azohía and Escombreras islet are located within natural park boundaries. Similarly, the Habibas islands benefit from environmental protection.
