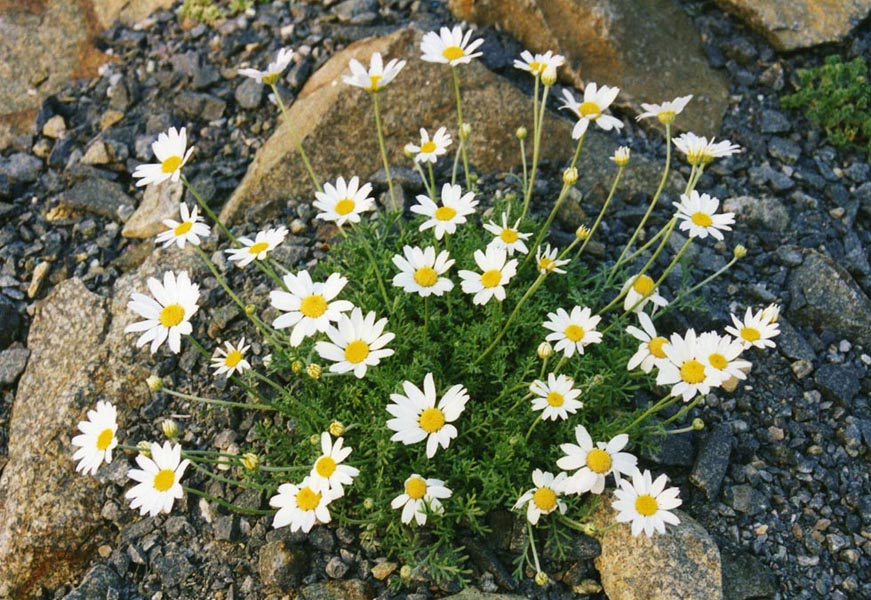
- Anthemis cretica subsp. cretica

Scientific classification
- Kingdom: Plantae
- Clade: Tracheophytes
- Clade: Angiosperms
- Clade: Eudicots
- Clade: Asterids
- Order: Asterales
- Family: Asteraceae
- Genus: Anthemis
- Species: A. cretica

Binomial name
- Anthemis cretica L.

Synonyms
- List: Anacyclus creticus L.; Anthemis abrotanifolia subsp. panachaica (Halácsy) Govaerts; Anthemis absinthifolia Boiss. & Spruner; Anthemis albida Boiss.; Anthemis alpina Gouan; Anthemis alpina Moric. ex Nyman; Anthemis amasiana Hausskn. & Bornm.; Anthemis anacyclus J.Gay ex Boiss.; Anthemis anahytae Woronow ex Fed.; Anthemis anahytae Woronow ex Sosn.; Anthemis anatolica Boiss.; Anthemis anatolica f. discoidea (Boiss.) R.Fern.; Anthemis argaea Boiss. & Balansa; Anthemis baumgarteniana Schur; Anthemis blancheana Boiss.; Anthemis byzantina K.Koch; Anthemis calabrica (Arcang.) Brullo, Scelsi & Spamp.; Anthemis candicans Boiss.; Anthemis carpatica Waldst. & Kit. ex Willd.; Anthemis carpatica f. alibotusensis (Thin) Kuzmanov & Gussev; Anthemis carpatica var. balcanica (Stoj. & Acht.) Thin; Anthemis carpatica var. macedonica (Griseb.) Kuzmanov & Gussev; Anthemis carpatica var. mariae (Sennen) R.Fern.; Anthemis carpatica f. nigra Thin; Anthemis carpatica subsp. petraea (Ten.) R.Fernandes; Anthemis carpatica f. puberula Thin; Anthemis carpatica var. pumila R.Fern.; Anthemis carpatica var. styriaca (Vest) R.Fern.; Anthemis cassia Boiss.; Anthemis chronia Nyman; Anthemis chrysocephala Boiss. & Reut.; Anthemis cinerea Pancic; Anthemis collina Jord.; Anthemis columnae (Ten.) Landolt; Anthemis cretica var. hinkovae (Thin) Kuzmanov & Gussev; Anthemis cretica var. macrocephala (Jeanb. & Timb.-Lagr.) O.Bolòs & Vigo; Anthemis cretica var. mariae (Sennen) O.Bolòs & Vigo; Anthemis cretica f. minor R.Fern.; Anthemis cretica subsp. pontica (Willd.) Grierson; Anthemis cretica subsp. subcinerea (Rouy) O.Bolòs & Vigo; Anthemis cretica var. subcinerea (Rouy) O.Bolòs & Vigo; Anthemis cretica var. subscaposa (Rouy) O.Bolòs & Vigo; Anthemis cronia Boiss. & Heldr.; Anthemis debilifolia Eig; Anthemis divergens Boiss.; Anthemis emiliae Sosn.; Anthemis gerardiana Jord.; Anthemis gerardiana var. macrocephala Jeanb. & Timb.-Lagr.; Anthemis grandiflora Host; Anthemis graveolens Schur; Anthemis hinkovae Thin; Anthemis hirpina Ten. ex Guss.; Anthemis iberica M.Bieb.; Anthemis kitaibelii DC.; Anthemis kuzmanovii Thin; Anthemis kuzmanovii var. alibotusensis Thin; Anthemis kuzmanovii f. zlatogradensis Thin; Anthemis leucanthemoides Boiss.; Anthemis leucocephala Schur; Anthemis lindleyi Nyman; Anthemis messanensis Brullo; Anthemis meteorica Hausskn. ex Nyman; Anthemis micheliana Guss.; Anthemis montana L.; Anthemis montana Sm.; Anthemis montana subsp. alpina (L.) Pignatti; Anthemis montana var. balcanica; Anthemis montana var. calabrica Arcang.; Anthemis montana var. columnae Ten.; Anthemis montana var. macedonica Griseb.; Anthemis montana var. subscaposa; Anthemis mucronulata Rchb.; Anthemis numidica Batt.; Anthemis orientalis var. radiata; Anthemis panachaica Halácsy; Anthemis pentelica Boiss. ex Nyman; Anthemis petraea Ten.; Anthemis pontica Willd.; Anthemis ptarmiciformis K.Koch; Anthemis punctata Guss. ex Nyman; Anthemis pusilla Greuter; Anthemis pyrethriformis Schur; Anthemis pyrethrum Gouan; Anthemis reuteriana Boiss.; Anthemis samia Rech.f.; Anthemis saportana Albov; Anthemis saxatilis Baumg. ex Schur; Anthemis saxatilis DC. ex Willd.; Anthemis saxatilis var. macrocephala (Jeanb. & Timb.-Lagr.) Benedí; Anthemis siwasiana Bornm.; Anthemis smyrnaea Boiss.; Anthemis styriaca Vest; Anthemis subcinerea Rouy; Anthemis subscaposa Rouy; Anthemis tempskyana Freyn & Sint.; Anthemis tenuiloba (DC.) R.Fernandes; Anthemis tenuiloba Boiss.; Anthemis tenuiloba subsp. cronia (Boiss. & Heldr.) R.Fernandes; Anthemis tenuiloba f. pentelica (Boiss.) R.Fern.; Anthemis tenuiloba f. radiata (Stoj. & Acht.) R.Fern.; Anthemis tenuiloba var. radiata (Stoj. & Acht.) Thin; Anthemis tenuiloba var. ramifera Thin; Anthemis umbilicata Boiss. & A.Huet; Anthemis urvillaei Nyman; Chamaemelum montanum All.; Chamaemelum orientale Schult. ex Steud.; Hiorthia orientalis Less.; Lasiospermum anthemoides G.Don ex Loudon; Lasiospermum rigidum G.Don ex Loudon; Lyonnetia abrotanifolia Less.; Lyonnetia alpina (L.) Sm.; Lyonnetia montana Griseb. ex Boiss. & Reut.; Lyonnetia pusilla Cass.; Lyonnetia rigida DC.; Lyonnetia tenuiloba DC.; Matricaria tempskyana (Freyn & Sint.) Rauschert; Pyrethrum abrotanifolium Pourr. ex Willk. & Lange; Pyrethrum nivale Adams ex Spreng.; Santolina alpina L.; Santolina erecta Pers.; Santolina rigida Sm.

= Anthemis cretica =

Species of flowering plant

Anthemis cretica, the Cretian mat daisy or white mat chamomile, is a species of flowering plant in the family Asteraceae. It or its many subspecies can be found around the Mediterranean region, the Black Sea area, Poland, the Caucasus, and the Middle East as far as Iran. It is highly morphologically variable, and the namesake of a species complex.

== Subtaxa ==
The following subspecies are accepted:

- Anthemis cretica subsp. absinthifolia (Boiss.) Grierson – Turkey
- Anthemis cretica subsp. albida (Boiss.) Grierson – Turkey
- Anthemis cretica subsp. alpina (L.) R.Fernandes – central Apennines (Italy)
- Anthemis cretica subsp. anatolica (Boiss.) Grierson – east Aegean Islands (Greece), Turkey, East Thrace (European Turkey)
- Anthemis cretica subsp. argaea (Boiss. & Balansa) Grierson – Turkey
- Anthemis cretica subsp. calabrica (Arcang.) R.Fernandes – southern Italy
- Anthemis cretica subsp. candicans (Boiss.) Grierson – Turkey
- Anthemis cretica subsp. carpatica (Willd.) Grierson – Albania, Austria, Bulgaria, France, Greece, Poland, Romania, Spain, Turkey, Ukraine, the former Yugoslavia
- Anthemis cretica subsp. cassia (Boiss.) Grierson – Lebanon, Syria, Turkey
- Anthemis cretica subsp. cinerea (Pancic) Oberpr. & Greuter – Bulgaria, the former Yugoslavia
- Anthemis cretica subsp. columnae (Ten.) Franzén – Algeria, France, Italy, Sicily
- Anthemis cretica subsp. cretica – Albania, Bulgaria, Greece, Iran, Lebanon, Syria, Romania, Turkey, East Thrace, the former Yugoslavia
- Anthemis cretica subsp. gerardiana (Jord.) Greuter – southeast France
- Anthemis cretica subsp. iberica (M.Bieb.) Grierson – North Caucasus, Transcaucasus, Turkey
- Anthemis cretica subsp. leucanthemoides (Boiss.) Grierson – east Aegean Islands, Crete, Turkey
- Anthemis cretica subsp. messanensis (Brullo) Giardina & Raimondo – Sicily
- Anthemis cretica subsp. panachaica (Halácsy) Oberpr. & Greuter – Panachaiko mountains of southern Greece
- Anthemis cretica subsp. petraea (Ten.) Greuter – central Apennines
- Anthemis cretica subsp. pyrethriformis (Schur) Govaerts – southern Carpathians (Romania)
- Anthemis cretica subsp. saportana (Albov) Chandjian – Iran, North Caucasus, Transcaucasus
- Anthemis cretica subsp. saxatilis (DC.) R.Fernandes – France, Andorra, Spain, Italy
- Anthemis cretica subsp. tenuiloba (DC.) Grierson – Albania, Bulgaria, Greece, Lebanon, Syria, Turkey, East Thrace, the former Yugoslavia
- Anthemis cretica subsp. umbilicata (Boiss. & A.Huet) Grierson – Iran, Turkey
