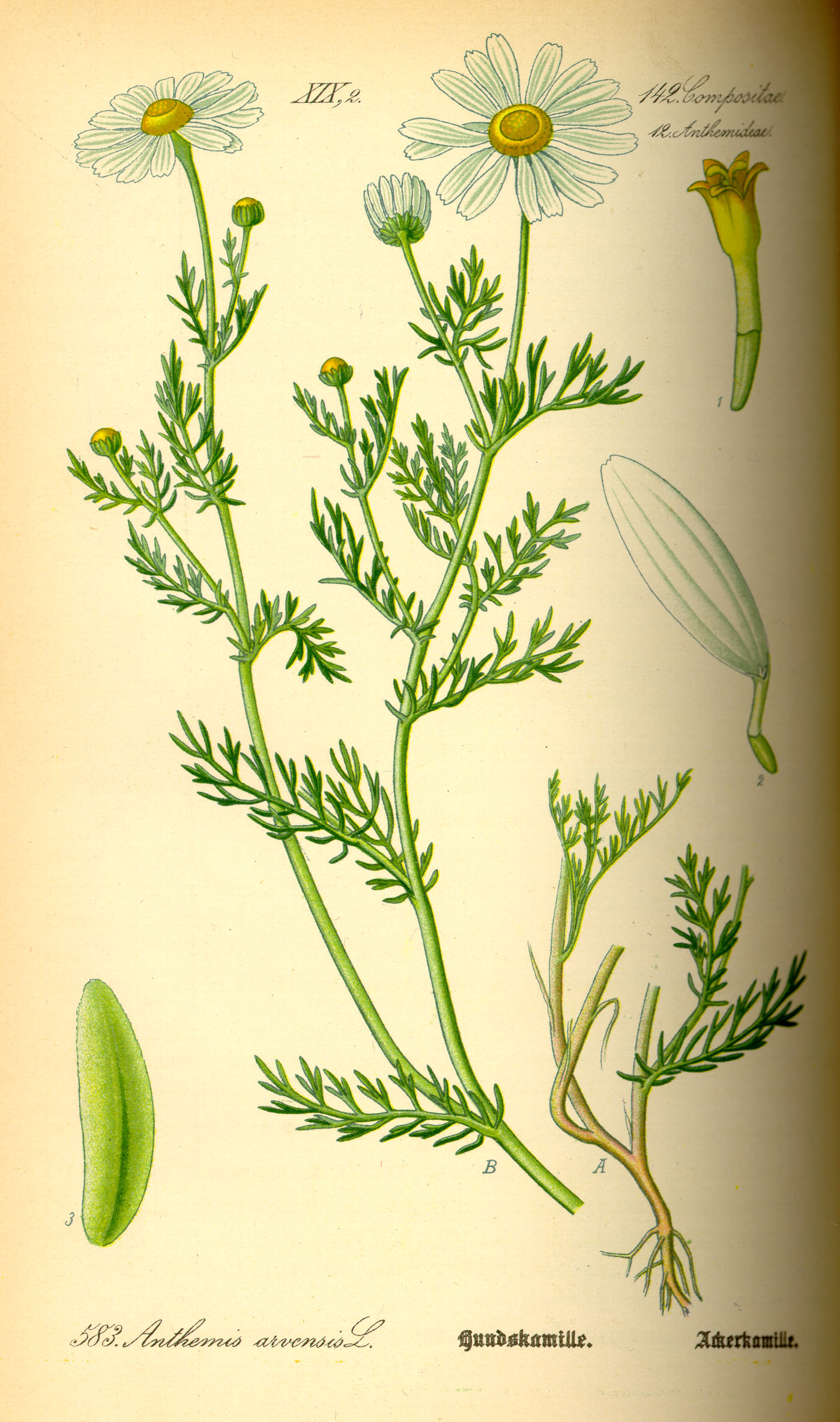
- Corn chamomile (Anthemis arvensis)

Scientific classification
- Kingdom: Plantae
- Clade: Tracheophytes
- Clade: Angiosperms
- Clade: Eudicots
- Clade: Asterids
- Order: Asterales
- Family: Asteraceae
- Subfamily: Asteroideae
- Tribe: Anthemideae
- Genus: Anthemis; L.

Type species
- Anthemis maritima L.

Synonyms
- Lyonnetia Cass.; Maruta (Cass.) Gray; Ammanthus Boiss. & Heldr. ex Boiss.

= Anthemis =

Genus of flowering plants

Anthemis is a genus of aromatic flowering plants in the family Asteraceae, closely related to Chamaemelum, and like that genus, known by the common name chamomile; some species are also called dog-fennel or mayweed. Anthemis are native to the Mediterranean region and southwest Asia east to Iran. A number of species have also become naturalized in the United Kingdom and other parts of the world.

There are around 100 species within this genus.

Anthemis species are used as food plants by the larvae of some Lepidoptera species including Orthonama obstipata (The Gem) and Bucculatrix anthemidella, a leaf-miner which feeds exclusively on Anthemis tinctoria.

== Cultivation and uses ==
Several species and cultivars are available for garden use. A. punctata subsp. cupaniana and Anthemis tinctoria 'E.C. Buxton' have gained the Royal Horticultural Society's Award of Garden Merit.

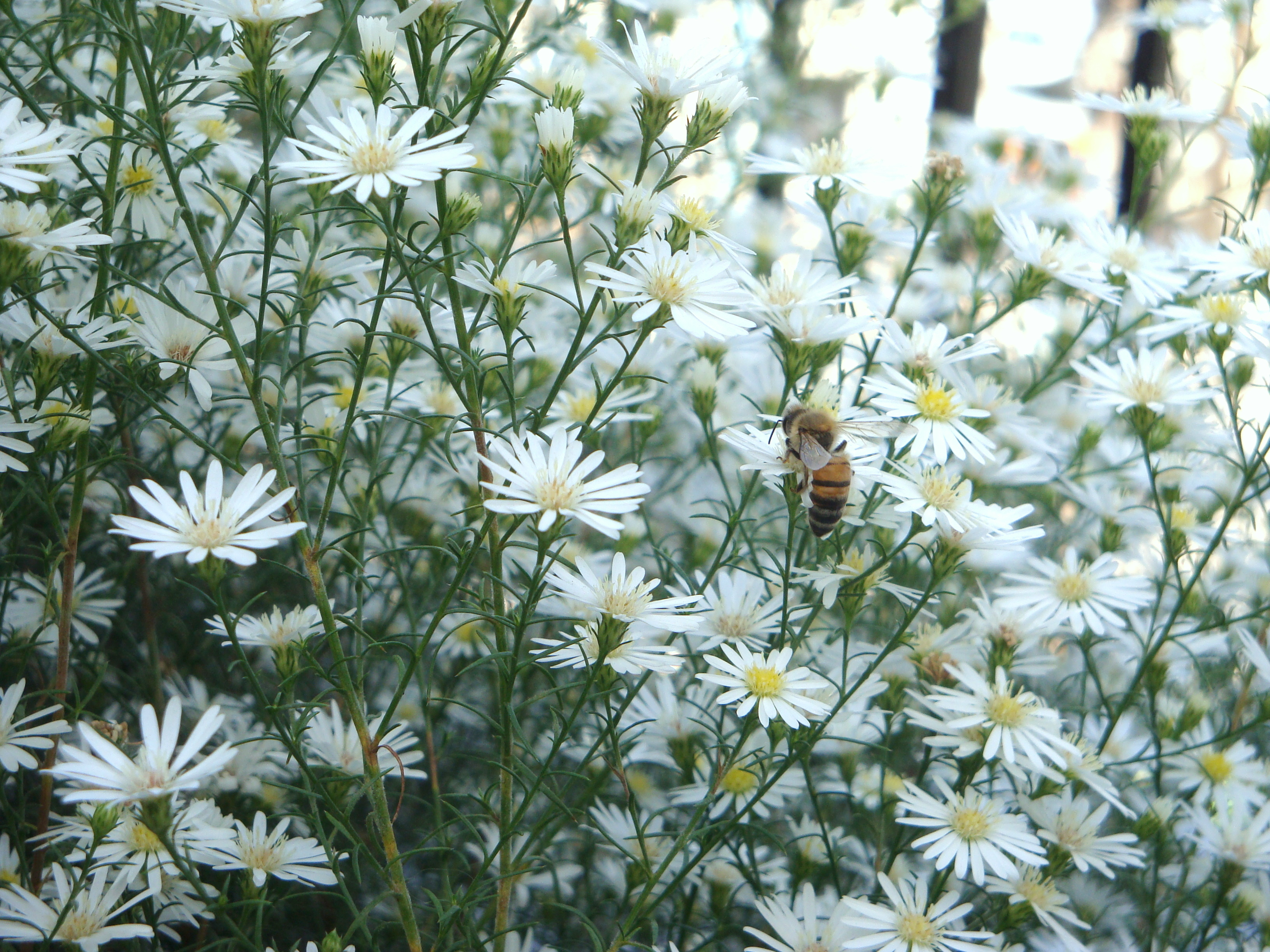
Anthemis cotula

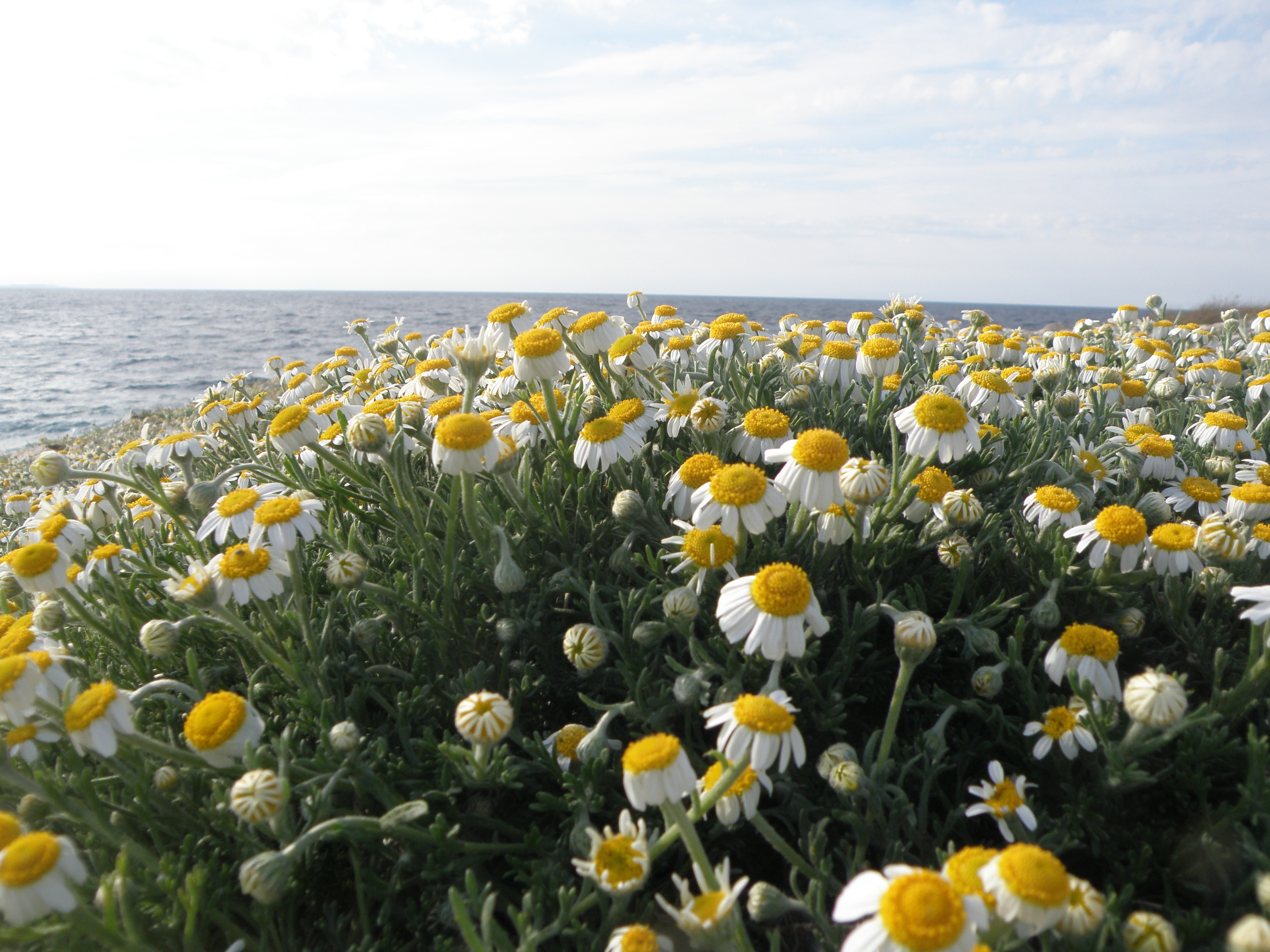
Anthemis tomentosa

== Species ==
The following species are accepted:

- Anthemis aaronsohnii Eig
- Anthemis abrotanifolia (Willd.) Guss.
- Anthemis abylaea (Font Quer & Maire) Oberpr.
- Anthemis aciphylla Boiss.
- Anthemis adonidifolia Boiss.
- Anthemis aeolica Lojac.
- Anthemis aetnensis Spreng.
- Anthemis alpestris (Hoffmanns. & Link) R.Fernandes
- Anthemis ammanthus Greuter
- Anthemis ammophila Boiss. & Heldr.
- Anthemis anthemiformis (Freyn & Sint.) Grierson
- Anthemis arenicola Boiss.
- Anthemis argyrophylla Velen.
- Anthemis arvensis L.
- Anthemis atropatana Iranshahr
- Anthemis auriculata Boiss.
- Anthemis austroiranica Rech.f., Aellen & Esfand.
- Anthemis × bollei Sch.Bip. ex Asch.
- Anthemis bornmuelleri Stoj. & Acht.
- Anthemis bourgei Boiss. & Reut.
- Anthemis boveana J.Gay
- Anthemis brachycarpa Eig
- Anthemis brachystephana Bornm. & Gauba
- Anthemis breviradiata Eig
- Anthemis bushehrica Iranshahr
- Anthemis candidissima Willd. ex Spreng.
- Anthemis chia L.
- Anthemis chrysantha J.Gay
- Anthemis concolor Lojac.
- Anthemis confusa Pomel
- Anthemis cornucopiae Boiss.
- Anthemis corymbulosa Boiss. & Hausskn.
- Anthemis cotula L.
- Anthemis cretica L.
- Anthemis cuneata Hub.-Mor. & Reese
- Anthemis cupaniana Tod. ex Nyman
- Anthemis cyrenaica Coss.
- Anthemis davisii Yavin
- Anthemis deserti Boiss.
- Anthemis deserticola Krasch. & Popov
- Anthemis dicksoniae Ghafoor
- Anthemis didymaea Mouterde
- Anthemis edumea Eig
- Anthemis emasensis Eig
- Anthemis fayedina Zareh
- Anthemis filicaulis (Boiss. & Heldr.) Greuter
- Anthemis fimbriata Boiss.
- Anthemis freitagii Iranshahr
- Anthemis fumariifolia Boiss.
- Anthemis fungosa Boiss. & Hausskn.
- Anthemis funkii (Sch.Bip. ex Willk. & Lange) Benedí
- Anthemis gharbensis Oberpr.
- Anthemis gilanica Bornm. & Gauba
- Anthemis gillettii Iranshahr
- Anthemis glaberrima (Rech.f.) Greuter
- Anthemis glareosa E.Durand & Barratte
- Anthemis gracilis Iranshahr
- Anthemis hamrinensis Iranshahr
- Anthemis handel-mazzettii Eig
- Anthemis haussknechtii Boiss. & Reut.
- Anthemis hebronica Boiss. & Kotschy
- Anthemis hemistephana Boiss.
- Anthemis hermonis Eig
- Anthemis hirtella C.Winkl.
- Anthemis homalolepis Eig
- Anthemis hyalina DC.
- Anthemis hydruntina E.Groves
- Anthemis indurata Delile
- Anthemis iranica Parsa
- Anthemis ismelia Lojac.
- Anthemis jordanovii Stoj. & Acht.
- Anthemis kandaharica Iranshahr
- Anthemis karacae Güner
- Anthemis kermanica Parsa
- Anthemis kitaibelii Spreng.
- Anthemis kotschyana Boiss.
- Anthemis kruegeriana Pamp.
- Anthemis laconica Franzén
- Anthemis leptophylla Eig
- Anthemis leucanthemifolia Boiss. & C.I.Blanche
- Anthemis leucolepis Eig
- Anthemis lithuanica Besser ex DC.
- Anthemis lorestanica Iranshahr
- Anthemis macedonica Boiss. & Orph.
- Anthemis macrotis (Rech.f.) Oberpr. & Vogt
- Anthemis maris-mortui Eig
- Anthemis maritima L.
- Anthemis marocana Batt. & Pit.
- Anthemis marschalliana Wes.
- Anthemis mauritiana Maire & Sennen
- Anthemis melampodina Delile
- Anthemis melanacme Boiss. & Hausskn.
- Anthemis micrantha Boiss. & Hausskn.
- Anthemis microcephala (Schrenk) B.Fedtsch.
- Anthemis microlepis Eig
- Anthemis microsperma Boiss. & Kotschy
- Anthemis mirheydari Iranshahr
- Anthemis moghanica Iranshahr
- Anthemis monilicostata Pomel
- Anthemis muricata (DC.) Guss.
- Anthemis nabataea Eig
- Anthemis odontostephana Boiss.
- Anthemis orbelica Pancic
- Anthemis orientalis (L.) Degen
- Anthemis parnesia Boiss. & Heldr.
- Anthemis parvifolia Eig
- Anthemis patentissima Eig
- Anthemis pauciloba Boiss.
- Anthemis pedunculata Desf.
- Anthemis peregrina L.
- Anthemis persica Boiss.
- Anthemis pignattiorum Guarino, Raimondo & Domina
- Anthemis pindicola Heldr. ex Halácsy
- Anthemis plebeia Boiss. & Noë
- Anthemis plutonia Meikle
- Anthemis pseudocotula Boiss.
- Anthemis pulvinata Brullo, Scelsi & Spamp.
- Anthemis punctata Vahl
- Anthemis pungens Yavin
- Anthemis rascheyana Boiss.
- Anthemis regis-borisii Stoj. & Acht.
- Anthemis retusa Delile
- Anthemis rhodensis Boiss.
- Anthemis rhodocentra Iranshahr
- Anthemis rigida Boiss. ex Heldr.
- Anthemis rosea Sm.
- Anthemis rumelica (Velen.) Stoj. & Acht.
- Anthemis ruthenica M.Bieb.
- Anthemis samariensis Turland
- Anthemis scariosa Banks & Sol.
- Anthemis schizostephana Boiss. & Hausskn.
- Anthemis scopulorum Rech.f.
- Anthemis scrobicularis Yavin
- Anthemis secundiramea Biv.
- Anthemis sheilae Ghafoor & Al-Turki
- Anthemis sibthorpii Griseb.
- Anthemis sintenisii Freyn
- Anthemis spruneri Boiss. & Heldr.
- Anthemis sterilis Steven
- Anthemis stiparum Pomel
- Anthemis susiana Nábelek
- Anthemis taubertii E.Durand & Barratte
- Anthemis tenuicarpa Eig
- Anthemis tenuisecta Ball
- Anthemis tigreensis J.Gay ex A.Rich.
- Anthemis tomentella Greuter
- Anthemis tomentosa L.
- Anthemis tranzscheliana Fed.
- Anthemis tricolor Boiss.
- Anthemis tricornis Eig
- Anthemis tripolitana Boiss. & C.I.Blanche
- Anthemis tubicina Boiss. & Hausskn.
- Anthemis ubensis Pomel
- Anthemis virescens Velen.
- Anthemis wallii Hub.-Mor. & Reese
- Anthemis wettsteiniana Hand.-Mazz.
- Anthemis xylopoda O.Schwarz
- Anthemis yemensis Podlech
- Anthemis zaianica Oberpr.
- Anthemis zoharyana Eig
