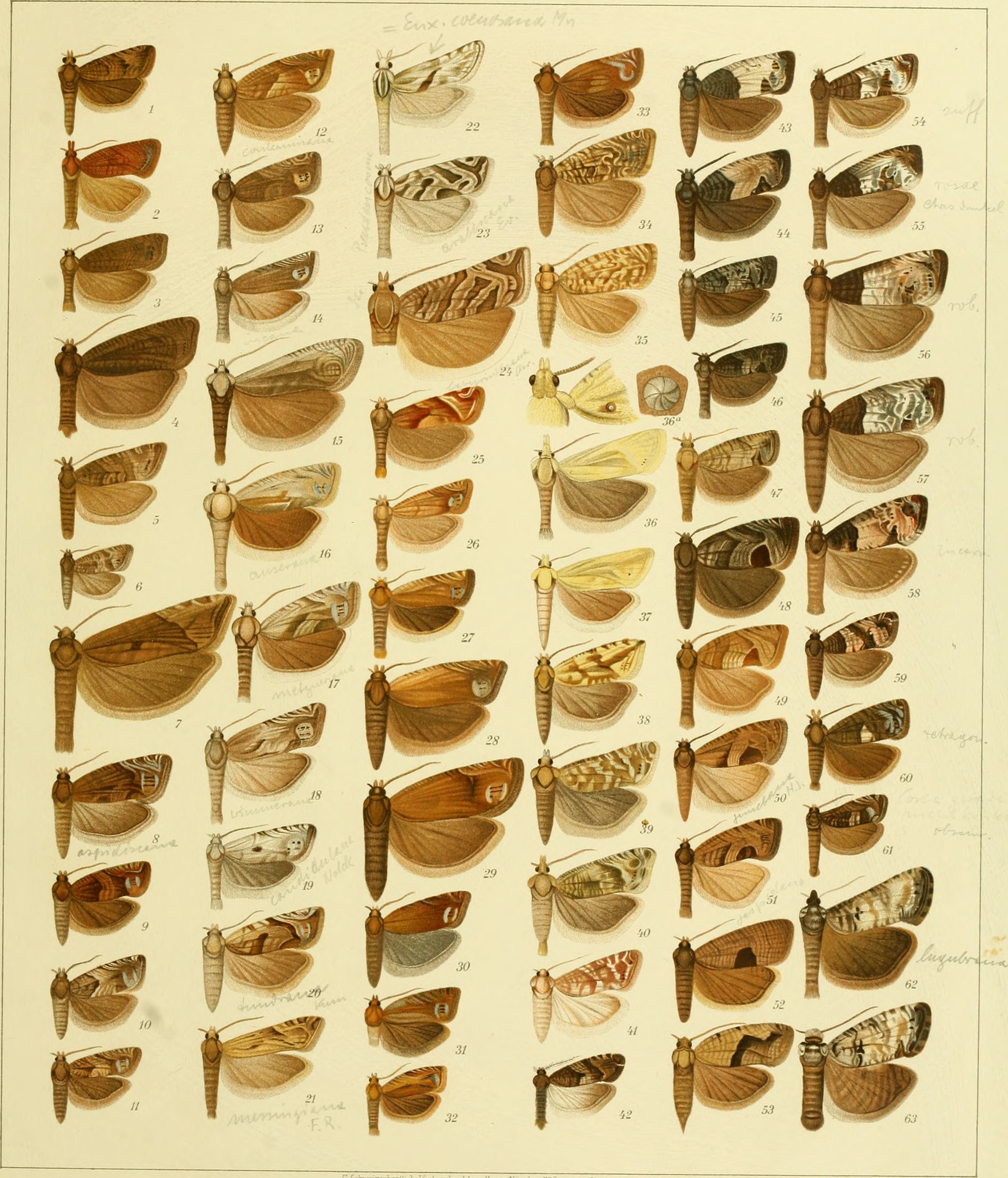
- Thiodia lerneana in Kennel Die palaearktischen tortriciden figure 2 male

Scientific classification
- Domain: Eukaryota
- Kingdom: Animalia
- Phylum: Arthropoda
- Class: Insecta
- Order: Lepidoptera
- Family: Tortricidae
- Genus: Thiodia
- Species: T. lerneana

Binomial name
- Thiodia lerneana (Treitschke, 1835)

Synonyms
- Grapholitha lerneana Treitschke, 1835; lernaeana Herrich-Schaffer, 1848

= Thiodia lerneana =

Species of moth

Thiodia lerneana is a species of moth of the family Tortricidae. It is found in Spain, France, Austria, Italy, Bulgaria, Romania, Lithuania, Russia, Transural, Kazakhstan, Turkmenistan and Kyrgyzstan.

The wingspan is 14–18 mm. Adults have been recorded on wing in June.
