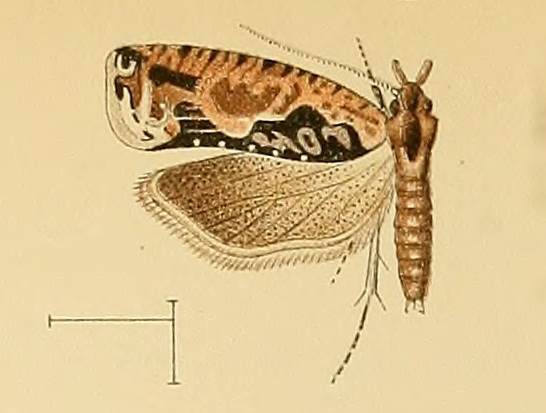

Scientific classification
- Domain: Eukaryota
- Kingdom: Animalia
- Phylum: Arthropoda
- Class: Insecta
- Order: Lepidoptera
- Family: Tortricidae
- Genus: Thiodia
- Species: T. glandulosana

Binomial name
- Thiodia glandulosana Walsingham, 1907

= Thiodia glandulosana =

Species of moth

Thiodia glandulosana is a moth of the family Tortricidae. It is found on the Canary Islands and Madeira.

The wingspan is 13–21 mm. The forewings are ochraceous suffused with brownish. The hindwings are greyish fuscous.

The larvae feed on Rhamnus glandulosa. They mine the leaves of their host plant. Full-grown larvae reach a length of about 12.5 mm.
