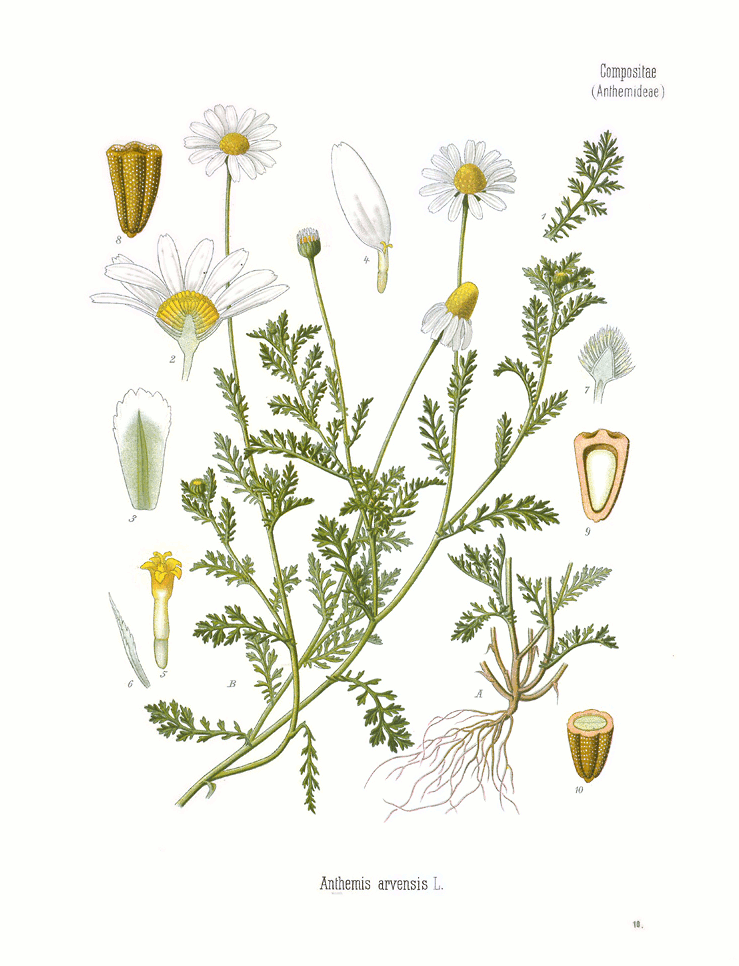
- Corn chamomile

Scientific classification
- Kingdom: Plantae
- Clade: Tracheophytes
- Clade: Angiosperms
- Clade: Eudicots
- Clade: Asterids
- Order: Asterales
- Family: Asteraceae
- Genus: Anthemis
- Species: A. arvensis

Binomial name
- Anthemis arvensis L. (1753)

Synonyms
- Synonymy: Anthemis agrestis Wallr.; Anthemis anglica Spreng.; Anthemis granatensis Boiss.; Anthemis kitenensis Thin; Anthemis sallei Sennen & Elias; Chamaemelum arvense (L.) Hoffmanns. & Link; Anthemis cyllenea Halácsy, syn of subsp. cyllenea; Anthemis australis Willd., syn of subsp. incrassata; Anthemis clavata Guss., syn of subsp. incrassata; Anthemis gemmellarii Tineo, syn of subsp. incrassata; Anthemis incrassata Loisel., syn of subsp. incrassata; Anthemis nicaeensis Willd., syn of subsp. incrassata; Anthemis brevifolia Lojac., syn of subsp. sphacelata; Anthemis sphacelata C.Presl, syn of subsp. sphacelata

= Anthemis arvensis =

Species of flowering plant

Anthemis arvensis, also known as corn chamomile, mayweed, scentless chamomile, or field chamomile, is a species of flowering plant in the aster family. It is used as an ornamental plant.

== Distribution ==
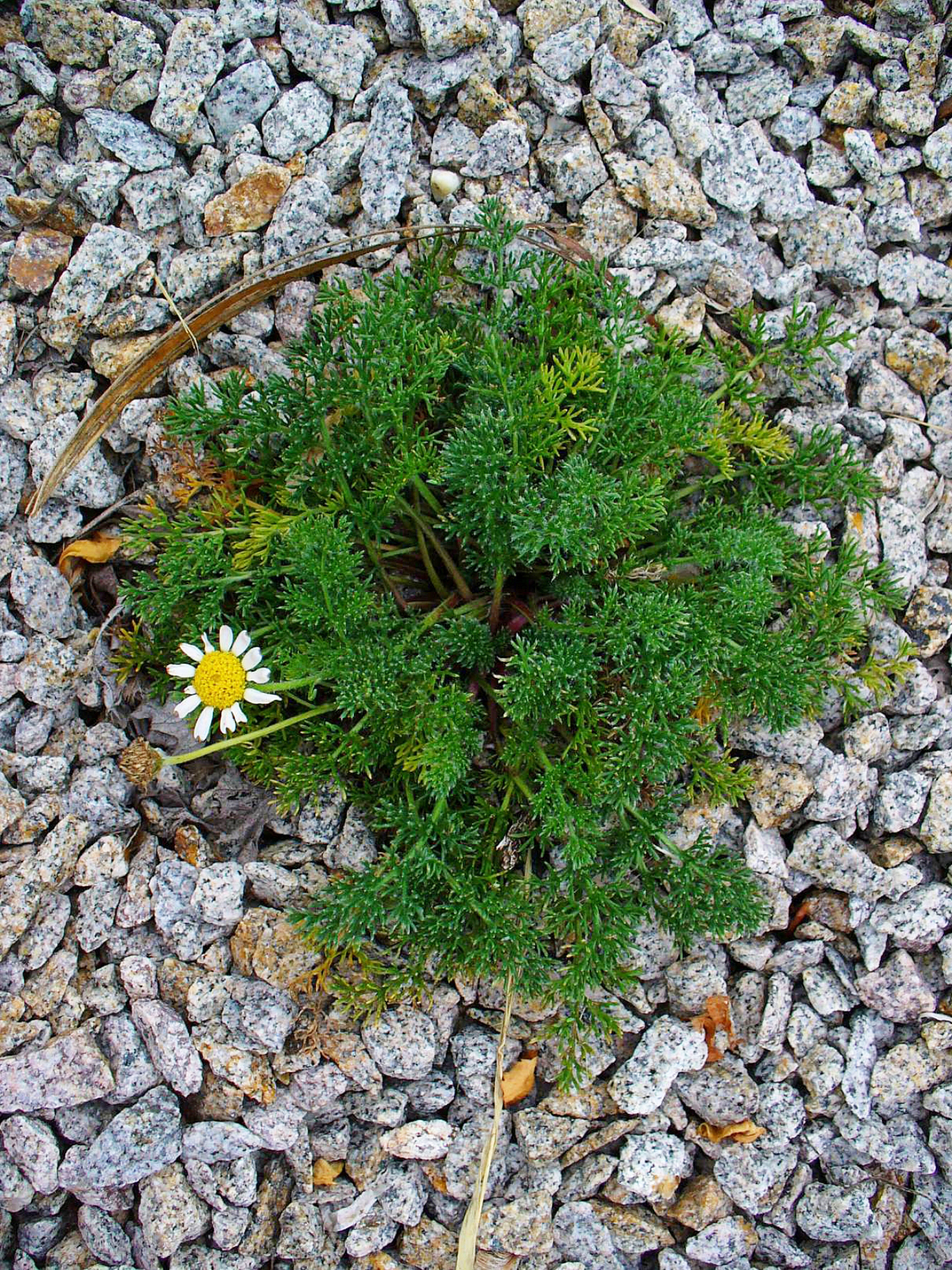
Photo from Karlsruhe, Germany.

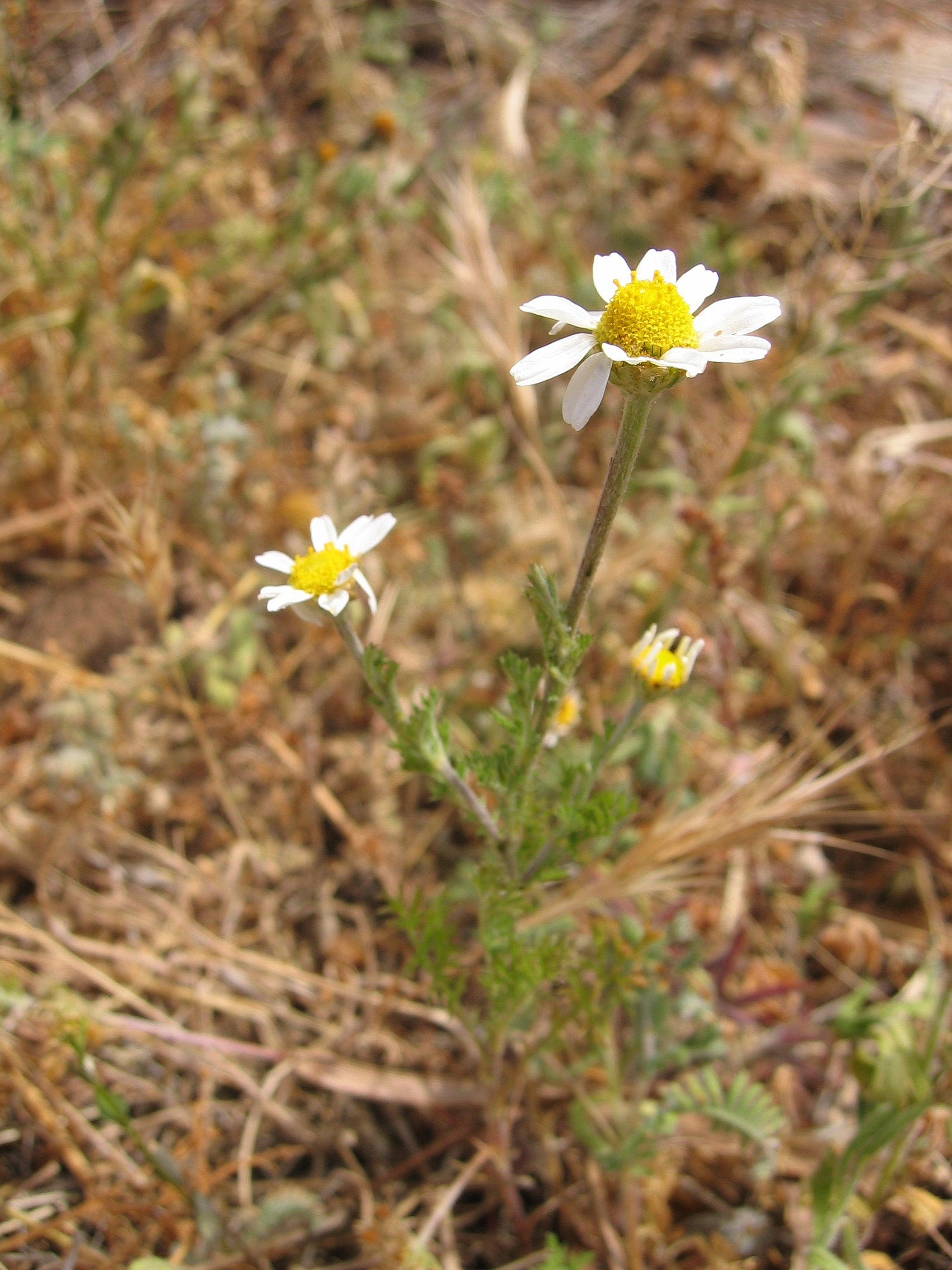
Photo from Calvi, France.

Native

Palearctic
Macaronesia: Azores, Canary Islands
Northern Africa: Algeria, Tunisia
Western Asia: Sinai, Iran, Iraq, Saudi Arabia, Turkey
Caucasus: Georgia, North Caucasus
Northern Europe: Denmark, Finland, Ireland, Norway, Sweden, United Kingdom
Central Europe: Austria, Belgium, Czech Republic, Slovakia, Germany, Hungary, Netherlands, Poland, Switzerland
East Europe: Belarus, Moldova, Ukraine, Crimea
Southeastern Europe: Albania, Bosnia and Herzegovina, Bulgaria, Croatia, Greece, Crete, Italy, Montenegro, North Macedonia, Romania, Sardinia, Serbia, Sicily, Slovenia
Southwestern Europe: France Corsica, Portugal, Spain, Balearic Islands

Introduced

Widely naturalized in North and South America, Africa, Australia, New Zealand, and parts of Asia.

== Subspecies ==
Six subspecies are accepted.

- Anthemis arvensis subsp. acrochordona Briq. & Cavill. – France, Italy, Sardinia
- Anthemis arvensis subsp. arvensis – Macaronesia, Europe, north Africa, Western Asia
- Anthemis arvensis subsp. cyllenea (Halácsy) R.Fern. – Greece including Cyclades
- Anthemis arvensis subsp. glabra (Rouy) Jeanm. – Corsica
- Anthemis arvensis subsp. incrassata (Loisel.) Nyman – Morocco and Mediterranean Europe from Portugal to Crete
- Anthemis arvensis subsp. sphacelata (C.Presl) R.Fern. – southern Italy and Sicily
