= Sierra de la Fausilla =

Natural space in the south of the Region of Murcia, Spain

Coordinates: 37°34′00″N 0°54′35″W

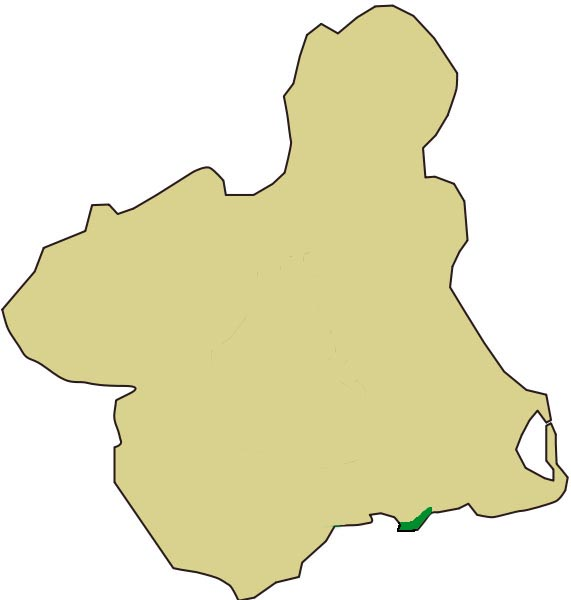
Situation of the Sierra de la Fausilla within the Region of Murcia.

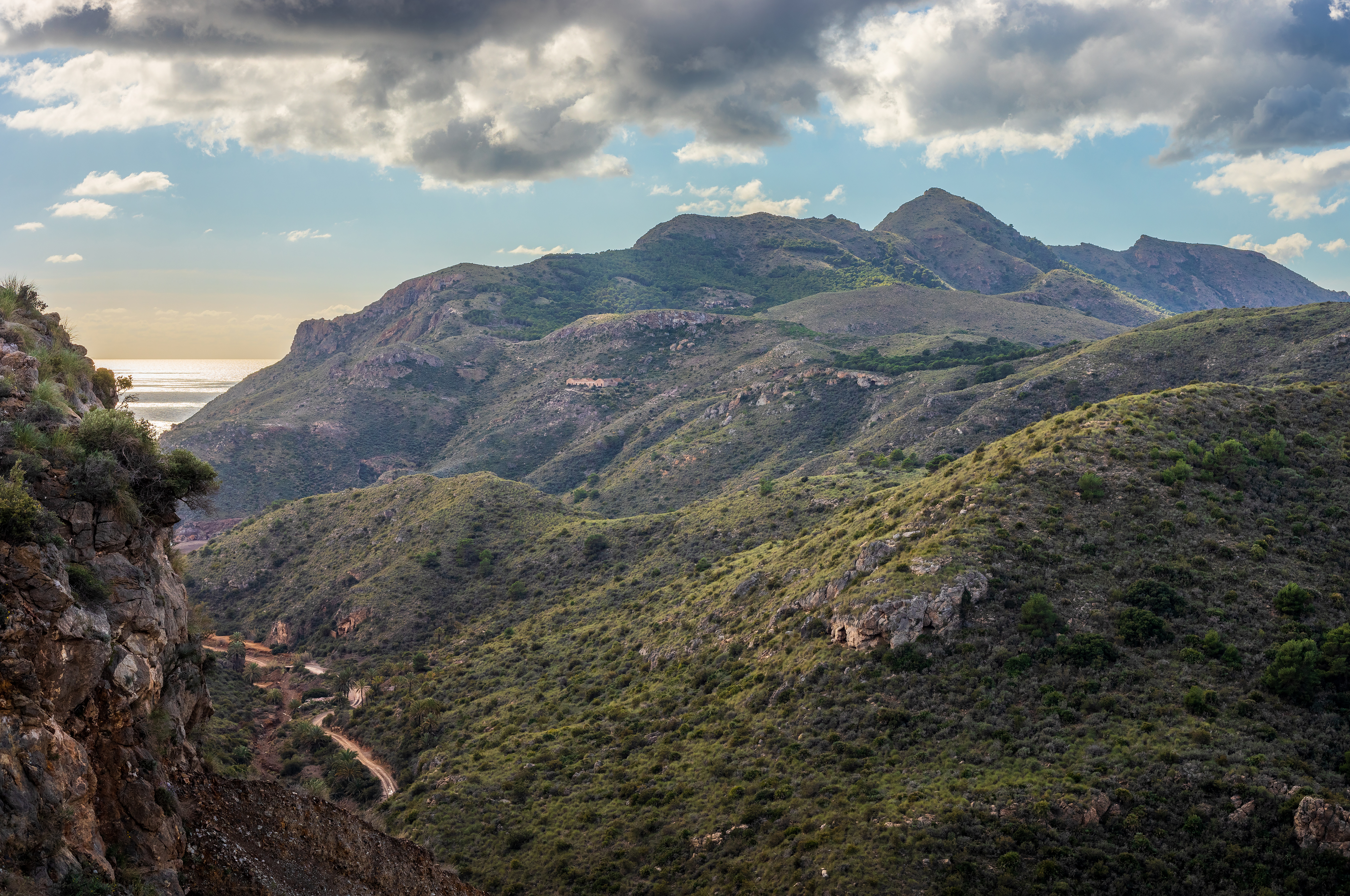
View of the Sierra de la Fausilla from the Avenque watercourse.

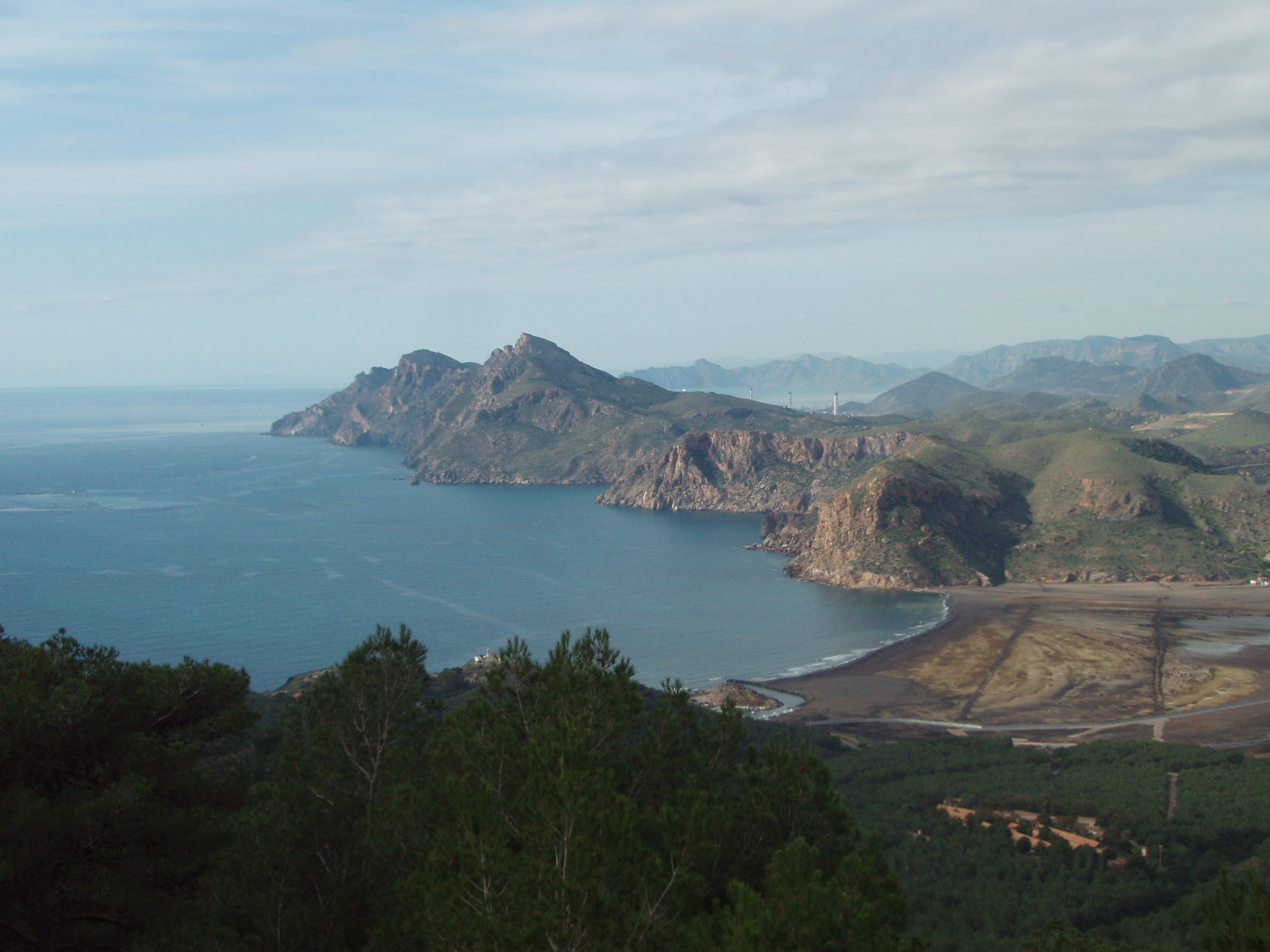
Sierra de la Fausilla mountain range seen from the Cenizas mountain. In the centre, the bay of Portmán, clogged with mining waste.

The Sierra de la Fausilla (or "Faucilla") natural area is located in the south of the Region of Murcia, in the municipality of Cartagena, to the east of the city in the area surrounding the Bay of Escombreras. It has a surface area of 791 ha.

It is an area of great ecological importance and has been declared a Special Protection Area for Birds (SPA) and a Site of Community Importance (SCI).

== Geology ==
This protected area is located in the western sector of the Sierra minera de Cartagena-La Unión, a mountain range that constitutes one of the last foothills of the Baetic System, formed in the Tertiary period, during the so-called Alpine orogeny, due to the collision of the European and African plate tectonics.

This area of the Sierra Minera forms part of the so-called Alpujarra complex, made up mainly of metamorphic and sedimentary rocks, mainly limestone.

== Fauna and flora ==
It is characterised by a vegetation of cornicales and tomillares, in which the presence of a large number of protected endemic and Ibero-African plant species stands out, some of which are in danger of extinction, such as the Cartagena cypress, the cornical, the arto, the chumberillo de lobo (Caralluma europaea), the rabogato del Mar Menor (Sideritis marminorensis), the siempreviva de Cartagena (Limonium carthaginese), the zamarrilla de Cartagena (Teucrium carthaginense), the manzanilla de Escombreras (Anthemis chrysantha), and Teucrium freynii.

Birds include peregrine falcon, eagle-owl, Bonelli's eagle and trumpeter finch.

== Threats ==
The Sierra de la Fausilla has already experienced serious deterioration of its environment with the clearing of an enormous portion of land in the Aguilones rock for the construction of the Escombreras super-port.

Currently, its eastern sector is also under threat, with the project to build a large container terminal in the cove of Gorguel.

On 15 March 2013, a fire broke out on its northern slope from 10:56 am to 8 pm (declared extinguished the following day), affecting approximately 50 hectares starting from the vicinity of the new REPSOL refinery. Its causes are not known at this time.
