= Anthemis brachycarpa =

Scientific classification
- Kingdom: Plantae
- Clade: Tracheophytes
- Clade: Angiosperms
- Clade: Eudicots
- Clade: Asterids
- Order: Asterales
- Family: Asteraceae
- Genus: Anthemis
- Species: A. brachycarpa

Binomial name
- Anthemis brachycarpa Eig

Species of flowering plant

Anthemis brachycarpa is a species of flowering plant in the family Asteraceae. It is native to Israel.

== Description ==
Anthemis brachycarpa is an annual species. The plant has alternate, dissected leaves, and daisy-like composite flower heads flowering in spring. The fruits are achenes.

== Habitat and distribution ==
Anthemis brachycarpa prefers light soil containing a low amount of limestone, and grows especially well in red sandy soils in its native Mediterranean climate. It is limited in natural distribution to a few locations on the Sharon plain in western Israel, where it is critically endangered.

== Names ==
In Hebrew the plant is called קַחְוָן קְצַר-פֵּרוֹת The specific epithet brachycarpa is in Greek and means "short-fruited."
