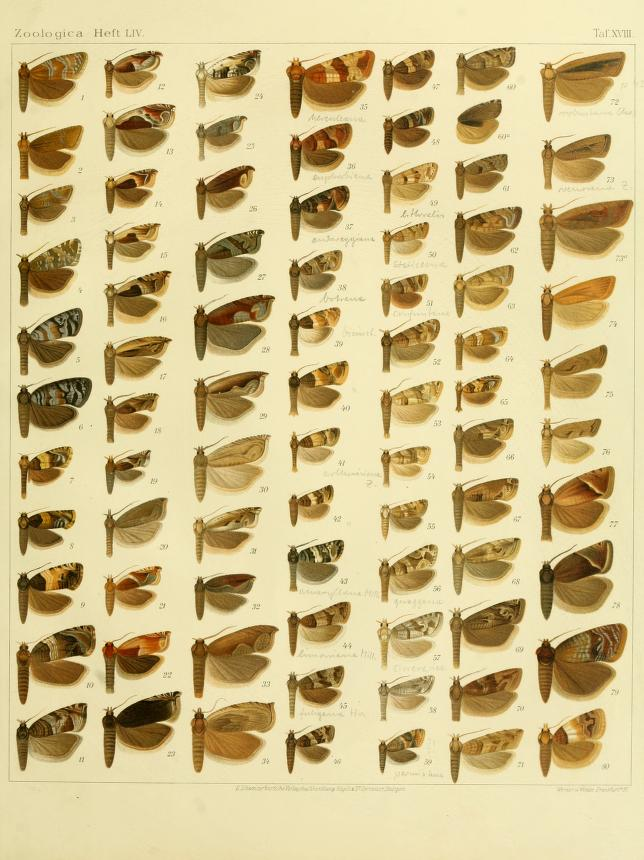
- Thiodia torridana in Kennel Die palaearktischen tortriciden figure 77, male

Scientific classification
- Domain: Eukaryota
- Kingdom: Animalia
- Phylum: Arthropoda
- Class: Insecta
- Order: Lepidoptera
- Family: Tortricidae
- Genus: Thiodia
- Species: T. torridana

Binomial name
- Thiodia torridana (Lederer, 1859)

Synonyms
- Tortrix (Lophoderus) torridana Lederer, 1859; Tortrix hastana Hubner, [1796-1799]; Foveifera hastana

= Thiodia torridana =

Species of moth

Thiodia torridana is a species of moth of the family Tortricidae. It is found in France, Germany, Austria, Switzerland, Italy, the Czech Republic, Slovakia, Slovenia, Hungary, Romania, Poland, Ukraine, Russia (southern Siberia, Amur-Zeya, Priamure, southern Primorsk, southern Sakhalin, Kuril Islands), Transcaucasia, Asia Minor, Kazakhstan, Turkmenistan and Kyrgyzstan.

The wingspan is 16–20 mm (0.63–0.79 in). Adults have been recorded on wing in June.

The larvae feed on Aster amellus, Succisa pratensis, Gnaphalium and Hieracium species. On Aster amellus, they mine the leaves. Larvae can be found from September to May.
