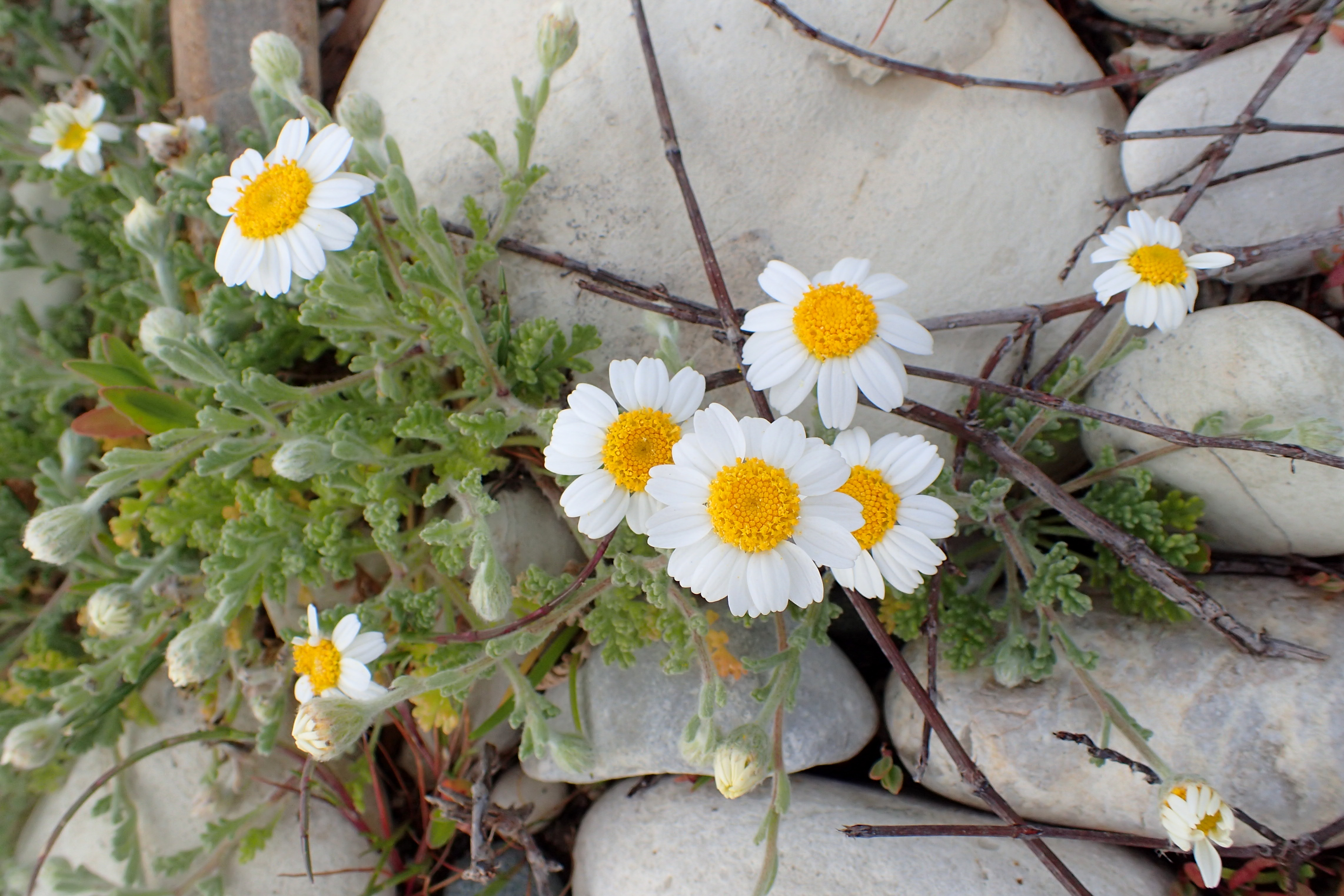

Scientific classification
- Kingdom: Plantae
- Clade: Tracheophytes
- Clade: Angiosperms
- Clade: Eudicots
- Clade: Asterids
- Order: Asterales
- Family: Asteraceae
- Genus: Anthemis
- Species: A. tomentosa

Binomial name
- Anthemis tomentosa L.

Synonyms
- List: Homotypic synonyms; Chamaemelum tomentosum (L.) All. Heterotypic synonyms; Anthemis altissima Bellardi; Anthemis guicciardii Heldr. & Sartori ex Boiss.; Anthemis muenteriana Heldr. ex Boiss.; Anthemis tomentosa f. discoidea R.Fern.; Anthemis urvillaeana Sch.Bip. ex Nyman

= Anthemis tomentosa =

Species of flowering plant

Anthemis tomentosa is a species of herbaceous flowering plant in the family Asteraceae. It is native to Eurasia.

== Distribution ==
Anthemis tomentosa grows naturally in France, Albania, Greece, Italy, Sicilia, Turkey, and the East Aegean Islands.

== Names ==
The common name in English is "woolly chamomile". In Croatian it is called pustenasti jarmen, and in Turkish it is called sahil papatyası.
