= Bucculatrix anthemidella =

Scientific classification
- Kingdom: Animalia
- Phylum: Arthropoda
- Clade: Pancrustacea
- Class: Insecta
- Order: Lepidoptera
- Family: Bucculatricidae
- Genus: Bucculatrix
- Species: B. anthemidella

Binomial name
- Bucculatrix anthemidella Deschka, 1972

Species of moth

Bucculatrix anthemidella is a moth in the family Bucculatricidae. It is found in Kyrgyzstan and Ukraine. The species was first described by G. Deschka in 1972.

The larvae feed on Anthemis tinctoria. They mine the leaves of their host plant.
