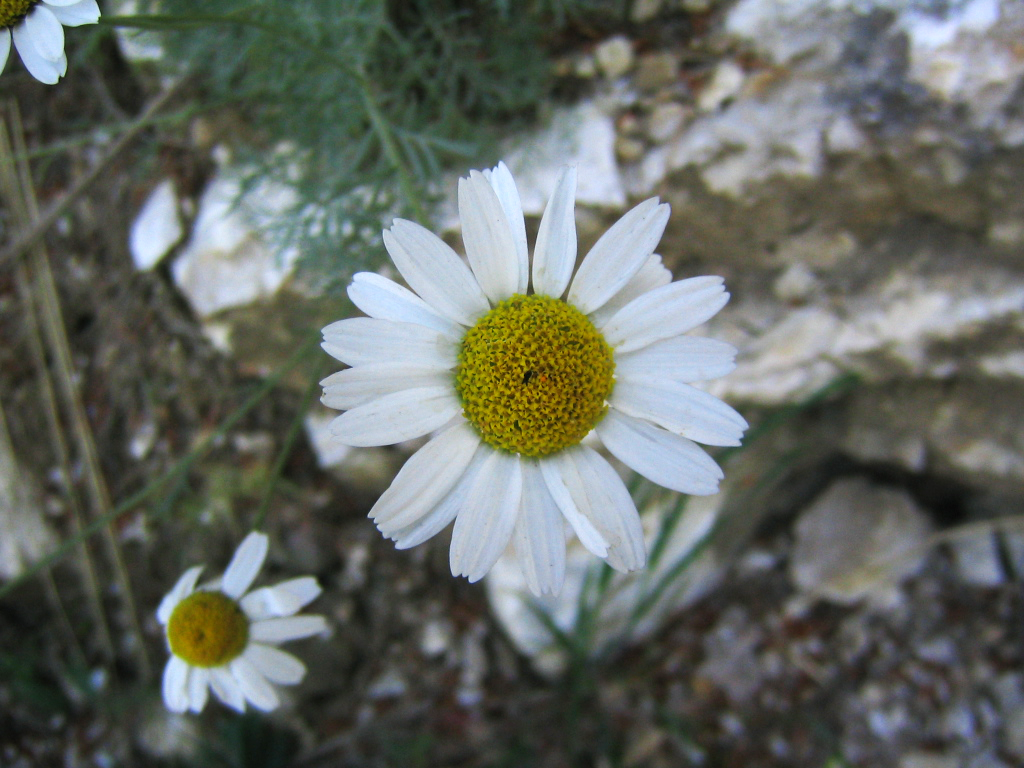
- Close-up of flower

Scientific classification
- Kingdom: Plantae
- Clade: Tracheophytes
- Clade: Angiosperms
- Clade: Eudicots
- Clade: Asterids
- Order: Asterales
- Family: Asteraceae
- Genus: Anthemis
- Species: A. cupaniana

Binomial name
- Anthemis cupaniana Tod. ex Nyman

Synonyms
- Anthemis punctata subsp. cupaniana (Tod. ex Nyman) R.Fernandes

= Anthemis cupaniana =

Species of plant in the genus Anthemis

Anthemis cupaniana, called the Sicilian chamomile, is a species of flowering plant in the genus Anthemis, native to Sicily, and introduced to France, Great Britain, Ireland, and the Chatham Islands. It may have gained the Royal Horticultural Society's Award of Garden Merit as Anthemis punctata subsp. cupaniana.
