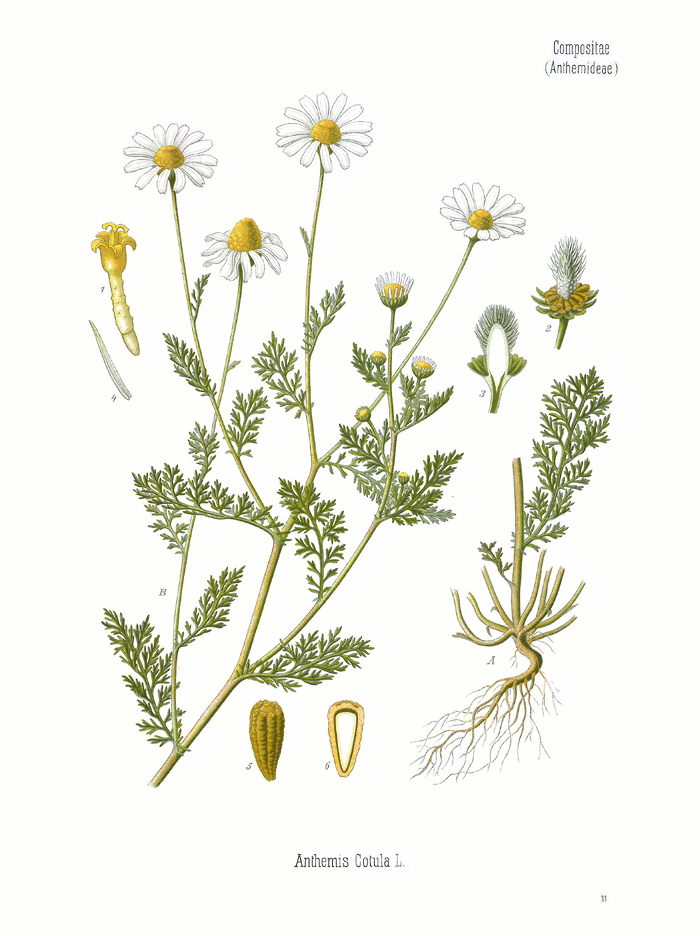
- Stinking chamomile

Conservation status
- Secure (NatureServe)

Scientific classification
- Kingdom: Plantae
- Clade: Embryophytes
- Clade: Tracheophytes
- Clade: Angiosperms
- Clade: Eudicots
- Clade: Asterids
- Order: Asterales
- Family: Asteraceae
- Genus: Anthemis
- Species: A. cotula

Binomial name
- Anthemis cotula L., (1753) not Blanco 1837

Synonyms
- Anthemis foetida Lam.; Anthemis psorosperma Ten.; Anthemis ramosa Link ex Spreng.; Chamaemelum cotula (L.) All.; Maruta cotula (L.) DC.; Maruta foetida Cass.

= Anthemis cotula =

Species of flowering plant

Anthemis cotula, also known as stinking chamomile or mayweed, is a flowering annual plant with a noticeable and strong odor. The odor is often considered unpleasant, and it is from this that it gains the common epithet "stinking". In pre-colonial times, its distribution was limited to Europe and Africa; though it was established in most of Europe, it was not present in Finland, Ireland, or the northernmost reaches of Scotland, in spite of the fact that these countries feature climatic regions favorable to this plant and are in proximity to countries where the species is native, such as Russia, Estonia, Lithuania and England. It has successfully migrated to the American continents where it can be found growing in meadows, alongside roads, and in fields.

The name "cotula" is the Latin form of κοτύλη kotylē, the Greek word for "small cup", describing the shape of the flowers; it was assigned by Carl Linnaeus in his work Species Plantarum in 1753.

Anthemis cotula is also known by a wide variety of other names, including mather, dog- or hog's-fennel, dog-finkle, dog-daisy, pig-sty-daisy, chigger-weed, mayweed, Johnnyweed, maroute, Maruta cotula, Cotula Maruta foetida, Manzanilla loca, wild chamomile, Camomille puante. Foetid Chamomile, maithes, maithen, mathor mayweed chamomile, camomille des chiens, camomille puante, stinkende Hundskamille, camomila-de-cachorro, macéla-fétida, and manzanilla hedionda.

== Description ==
The "stinking chamomile" Anthemis cotula is so-named for its resemblance to the true chamomile plant, Anthemis nobilis; both have branching upright stems each topped by a single large flower head, although the "stinking chamomile" is distinguished by lacking the membraneous scales underneath the flowers of the true chamomile, as well as by its characteristic strong odor. The leaves of Anthemis cotula have a similar appearance to those of the fennel plant (Foeniculum vulgare), from which the name "Dog's Fennel" is derived.

Anthemis cotula is an annual glandular plant with a harsh taste and an acrid smell. Its height varies from 30–60 cm (12–24 in).

Leaves
The leaves of the plant sometimes have very fine and soft hairs on the upper surface, although the plant is mostly hairless. There is no leaf stalk; leaves grow immediately from the stems. The leaves are pinnate in shape, with many extremely thin lobes, and can be around 25–50 mm (1–2 in) long.

Flowers
Each stem is topped by a single flower head which is usually around 25 mm (1 in) in diameter. The flower head is encompassed by between 10 and 18 white ray florets, each with a three-toothed shape; the florets tend to curve downwards around the edges and may occasionally have pistils, although these do not produce fruit. Beneath the flower proper, oval bracts of the plant form an involucre, with soft hairs on each; further bracts are bristled and sit at right angles to the flowers.

Fruits
The fruits are achenes (with no pappus). They are wrinkled, ribbed with ten ridges, and have small glandular bumps across the surface.

== Toxicity ==
Anthemis cotula is potentially toxic to dogs, cats, horses, and guinea pigs. Clinical signs include contact dermatitis, vomiting, diarrhea, anorexia, and allergic reactions. Long term use can lead to bleeding tendencies. The foliage may also cause skin irritation.

== Distribution ==
Native

Palearctic
Macaronesia: Azores, Canary Islands, Madeira
Northern Africa: Algeria, Egypt, Libya, Morocco, Tunisia
Eurasia: Armenia, Azerbaijan, Kurdistan, Russia, Georgia, India, North Caucasus, Dagestan, Cyprus, Iran, Iraq, Palestine, Lebanon, Syria, Turkey
Eastern Europe: Belarus, Estonia, Latvia, Lithuania, Crimea, Russia, Ukraine, Bulgaria
Northern Europe: Denmark, Norway, Sweden, England, Scotland, Finland
Central Europe: Austria, Czech Republic, Germany, Hungary, Poland, Switzerland
Southern Europe: Albania, Bosnia and Herzegovina, Croatia, Greece, Crete, Italy, North Macedonia, Montenegro, Romania, Serbia, Sicily, Slovenia, Sardinia, Corsica, Portugal, Spain, Balearic Islands
Western Europe: Belgium, Netherlands, France, Ireland, United Kingdom

Introduced

Naturalized in Americas, Southern Africa, and Oceania

== Spread to United States ==
Johnny Appleseed planted stinking chamomile, here called dog-fennel, during his travels in the early 19th century, believing it to be an antimalarial. Dog-fennel already had a reputation for being an aggressive invasive, however, so Appleseed's practice invited controversy. Harper's New Monthly Magazine in 1871 gave Appleseed credit for the overabundance of dogfennel:

The consequence was that successive, flourishing crops of the weed spread over the whole country and caused almost as much trouble as the disease it was intended to ward off; and to this day the dog-fennel, introduced by Johnny Appleseed, is one of the worst grievances of the Ohio farmers.
