= National Museum of Archaeology (Madrid) =

Archaeology museum in Madrid, Spain

- Museo Arqueológico Nacional

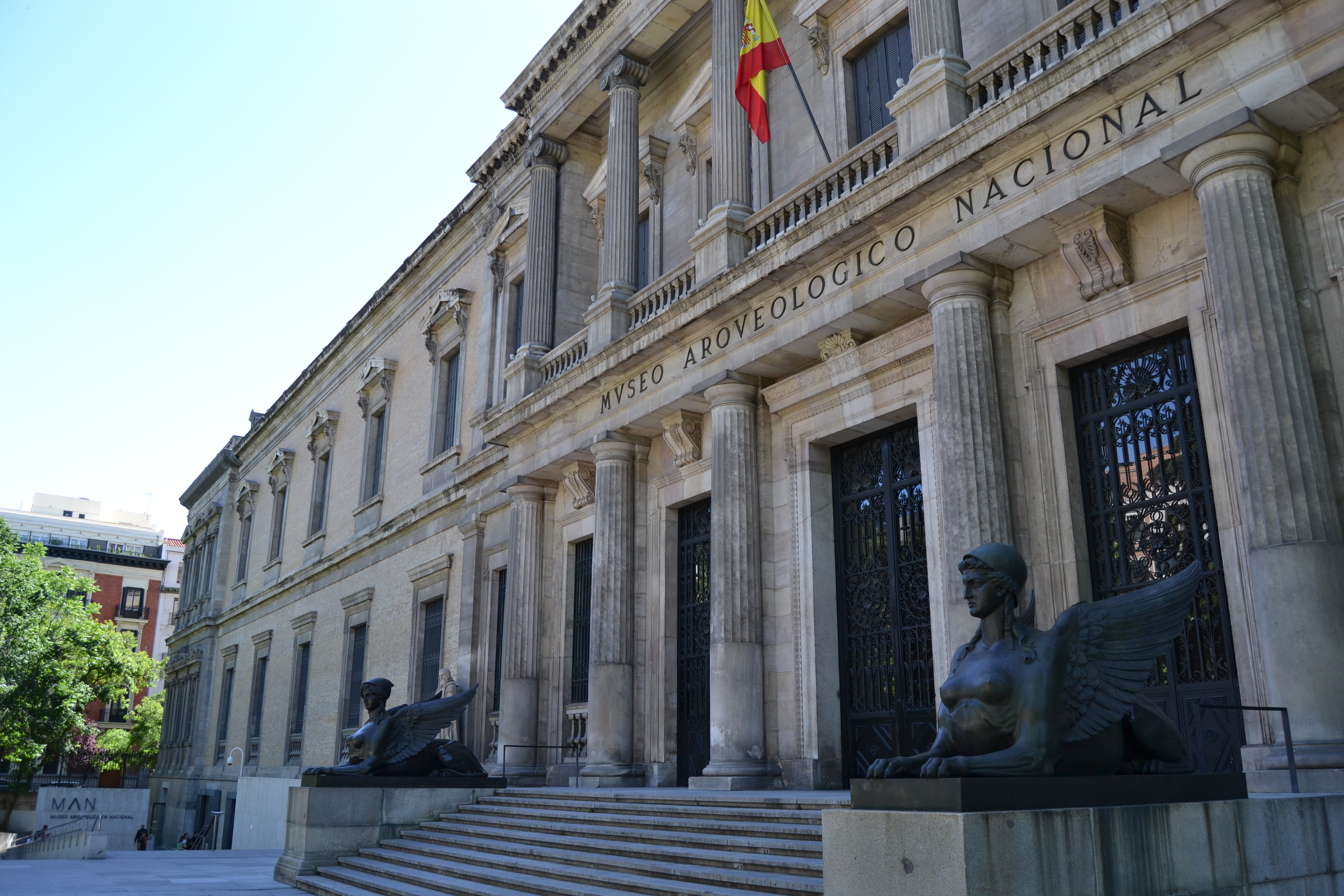
- Established: 20 March 1867
- Location: Calle de Serrano, 13, Madrid, Spain
- Coordinates: 40°25′25″N 3°41′22″W
- Type: Archaeology museum
- Visitors: 499,300 (2019)
- Director: Andrés Carretero Pérez
- Public transit access: Serrano; Retiro; Recoletos
- Website: www.man.es

Spanish Cultural Heritage
- Official name: Museo Arqueológico Nacional
- Type: Non-movable
- Criteria: Monument
- Designated: 1962
- Reference no.: RI-51-0001373

The National Museum of Archaeology (Spanish: Museo Arqueológico Nacional; MAN) is a archaeology museum in Madrid, Spain. It is located on Calle de Serrano beside the Plaza de Colón, sharing its building with the National Library of Spain. It is one of the National Museums of Spain and it is attached to the Ministry of Culture.

== History ==
The museum was founded in 1867 by a Royal Decree of Isabella II as a depository for numismatic, archaeological, ethnographical and decorative art collections of the Spanish monarchs. The establishment of the museum was predated by a previous unmaterialised proposal by the Royal Academy of History in 1830 to create a museum of antiquities.

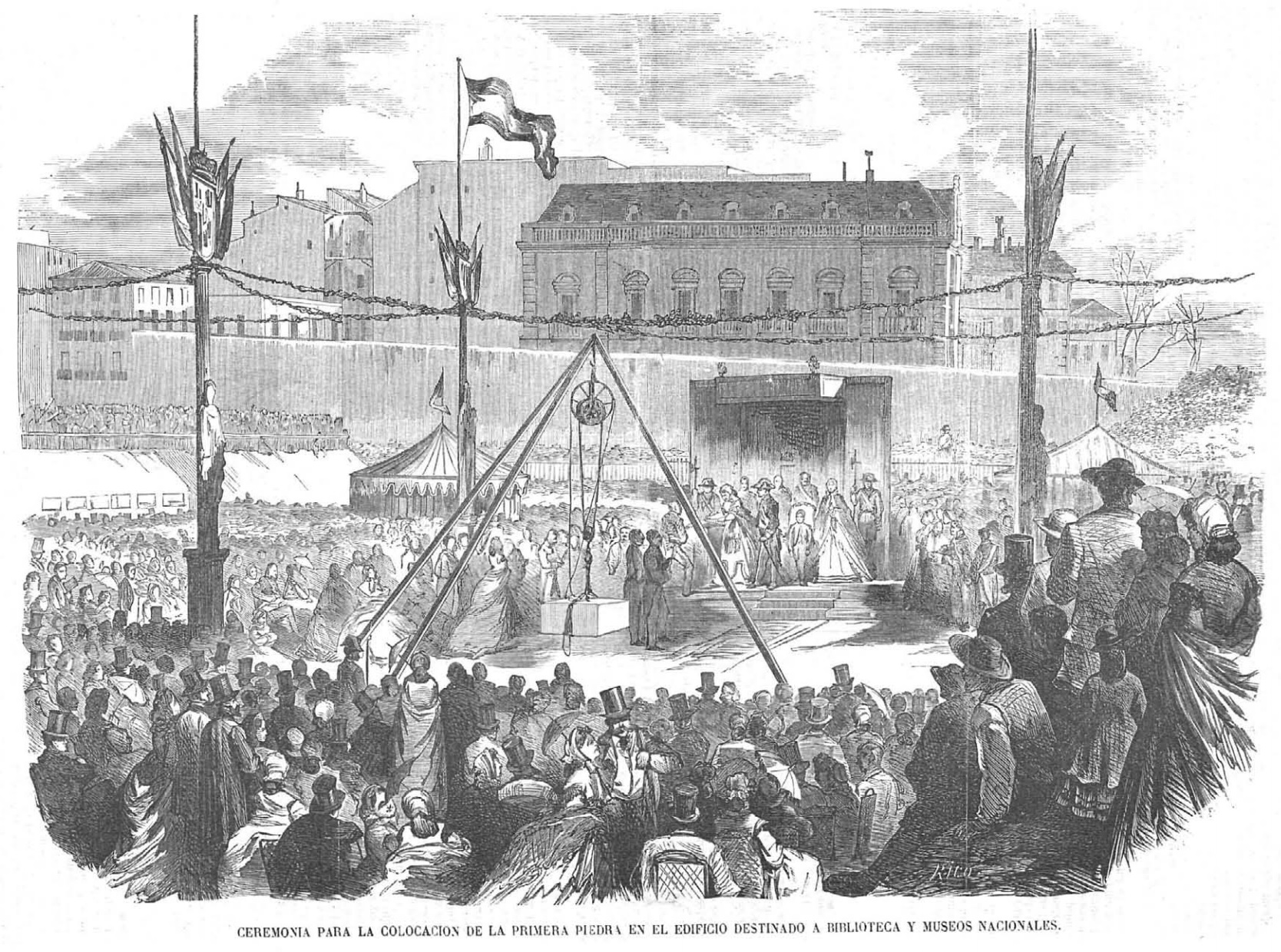
Laying of the first stone of the building destined for the National Museum of Archaeology and the National Library in 1866

The museum was originally located in the Embajadores district of Madrid. In 1895, it moved to a building designed specifically to house it, a neoclassical design by architect Francisco Jareño, built from 1866 to 1892. In 1968, renovation and extension works considerably increased its area. The museum closed for renovation in 2008 and reopened in April 2014.

Following a restructuring of the collection in the 1940s, its former pieces relative to the section of American Ethnography were transferred to the Museum of the Americas, while other pieces from abroad were destined to the National Museum of Ethnography and to the National Museum of Decorative Arts.

Its current collection is based on pieces from the Iberian Peninsula, from Prehistory to Early-Modern Age. However, it also has different collections coming from outside of Spain, especially from Ancient Greece, both from the metropolitan and, above all, from Magna Graecia, and, to a lesser extent, from Ancient Egypt, in addition to "a small number of pieces" from Near East.

== Permanent exhibition ==
=== Forecourt ===
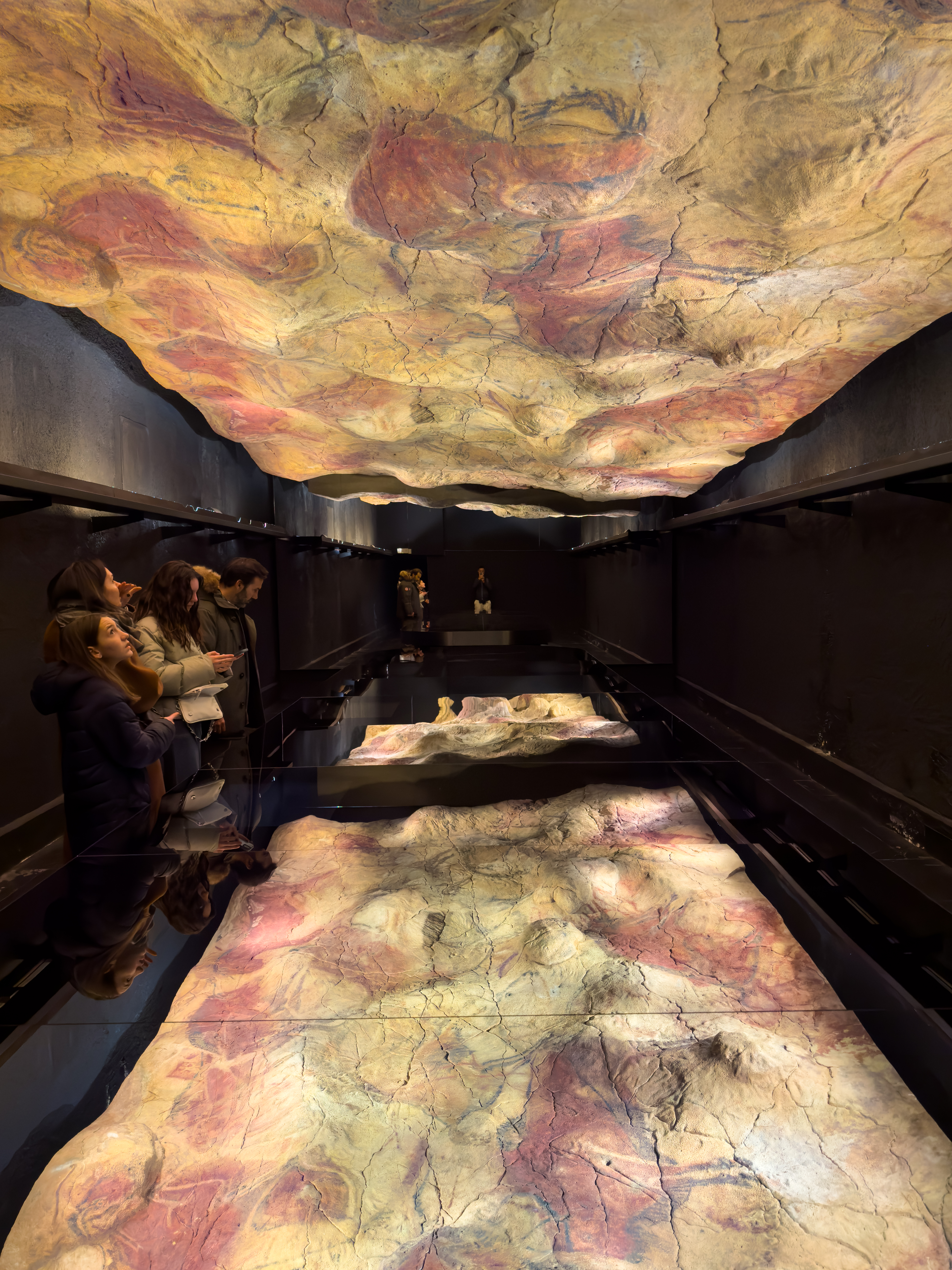
Replica of Altamira Cave paintings

In the forecourt is a replica of the Cave of Altamira from the 1960s. Photogrammetry was used to reproduce the famous paintings on a mould of the original cave. The replica cave is related to an exhibit at the Deutsches Museum in Munich.

=== Main building ===
Visitors enter the building at basement level, and pass to the prehistory section.

==== Protohistory ====
The halls devoted to the Protohistory of the Iberian Peninsula (1st floor) exhibit pieces from a number of Pre-Roman peoples existing roughly along the 1st millennia BC, as well as from the Punic-Phoenician colonisation. The former includes items from the Talaiotic culture, Iberian, Celtic, and Tartessian artifacts. The collection of Iberian sculpture from southern and southeastern Iberia is particularly notable, including stone sculptures such as the iconic Lady of Elche, the Lady of Baza, the Lady of Galera, the Dama del Cerro de los Santos, the Bicha of Balazote, the Bull of Osuna, the Sphinx of Agost, one of the two sphinxes of El Salobral or the Mausoleum of Pozo Moro.

Iberian sculpture
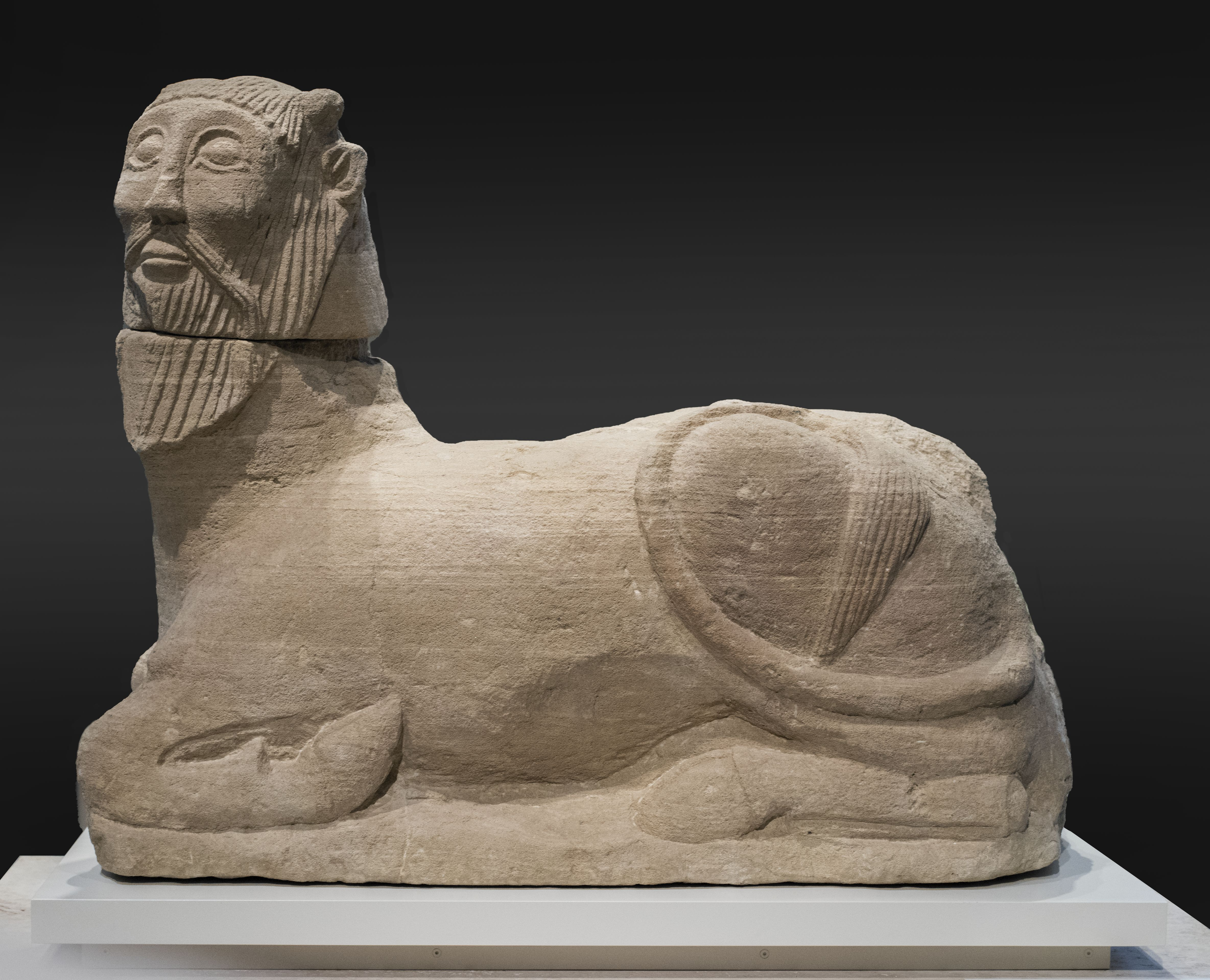
Bicha of Balazote

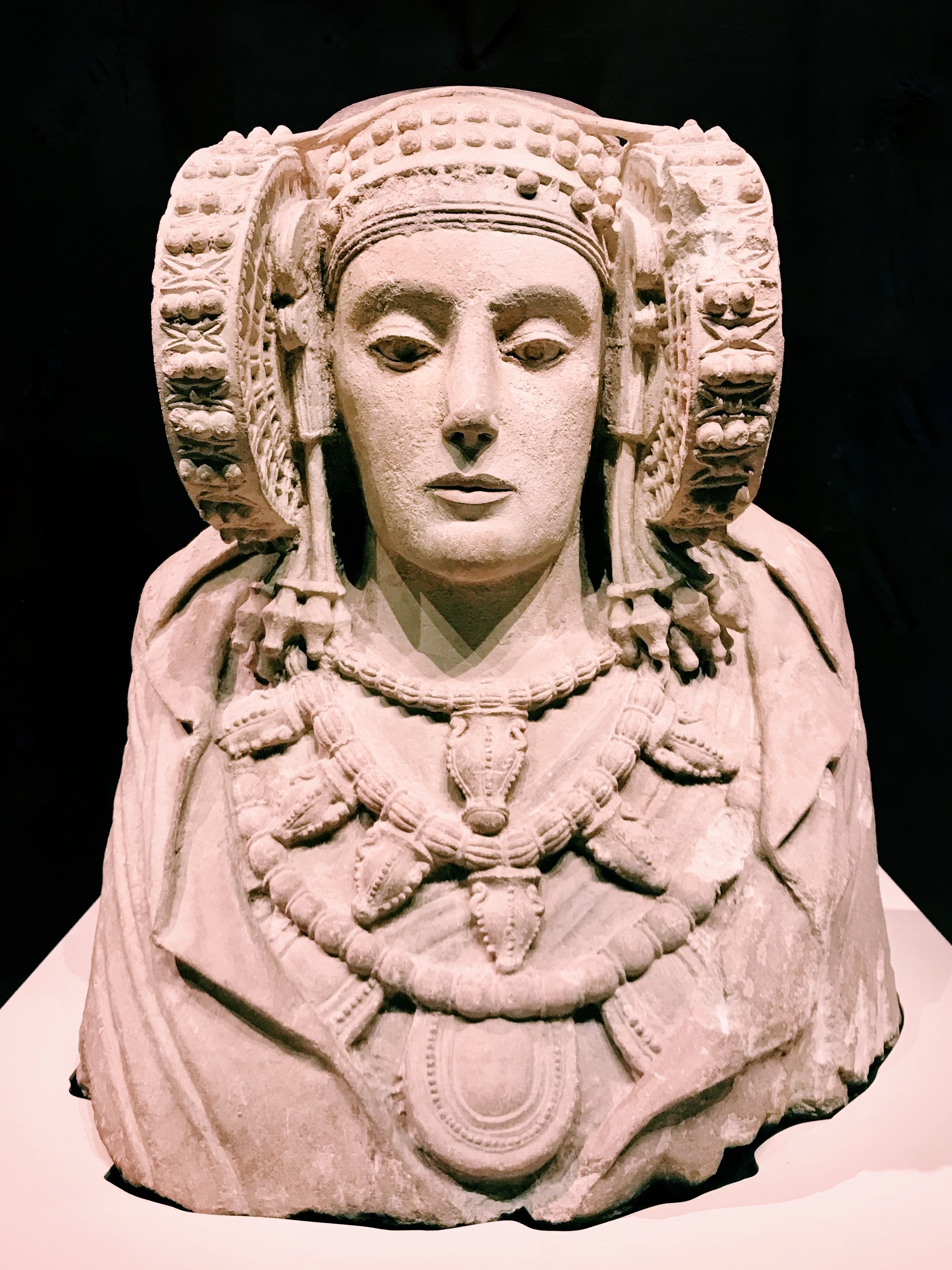
Lady of Elche

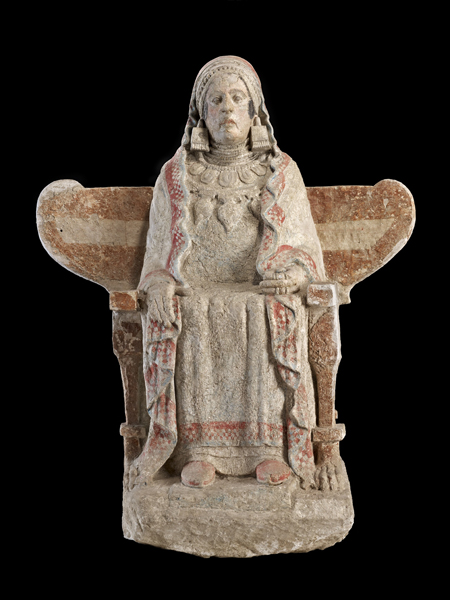
Lady of Baza

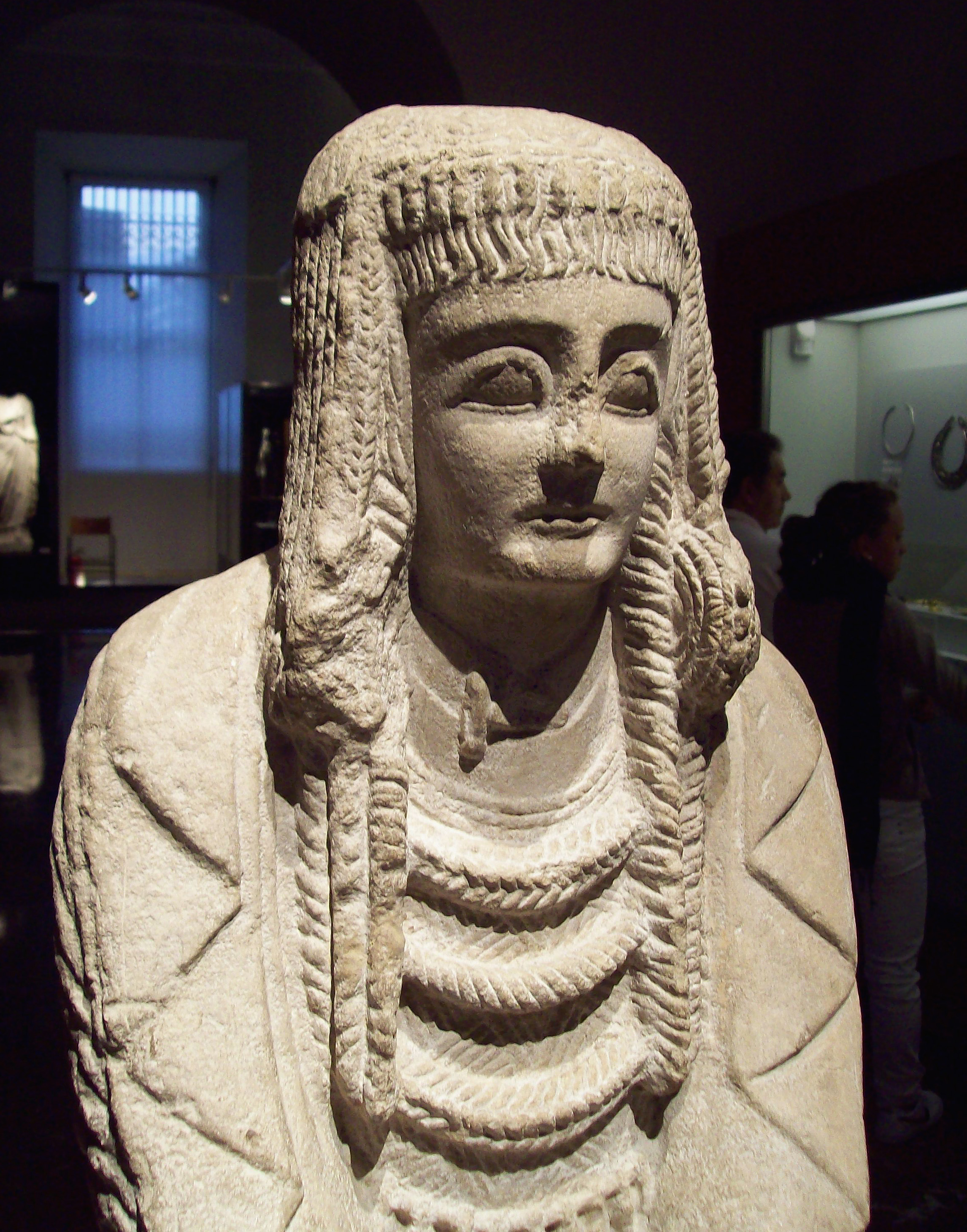
Lady of Cerro de los Santos

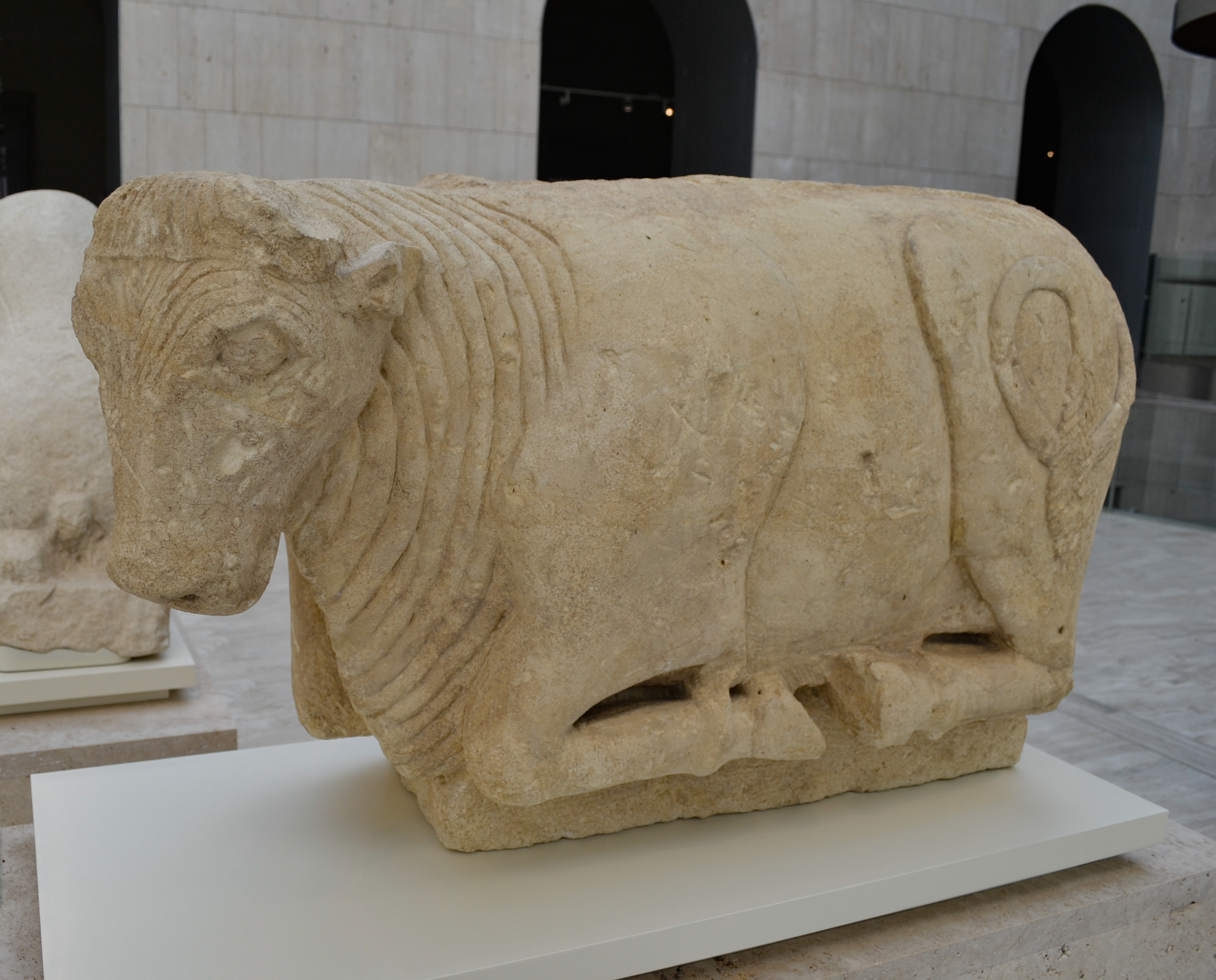
Bull of Osuna

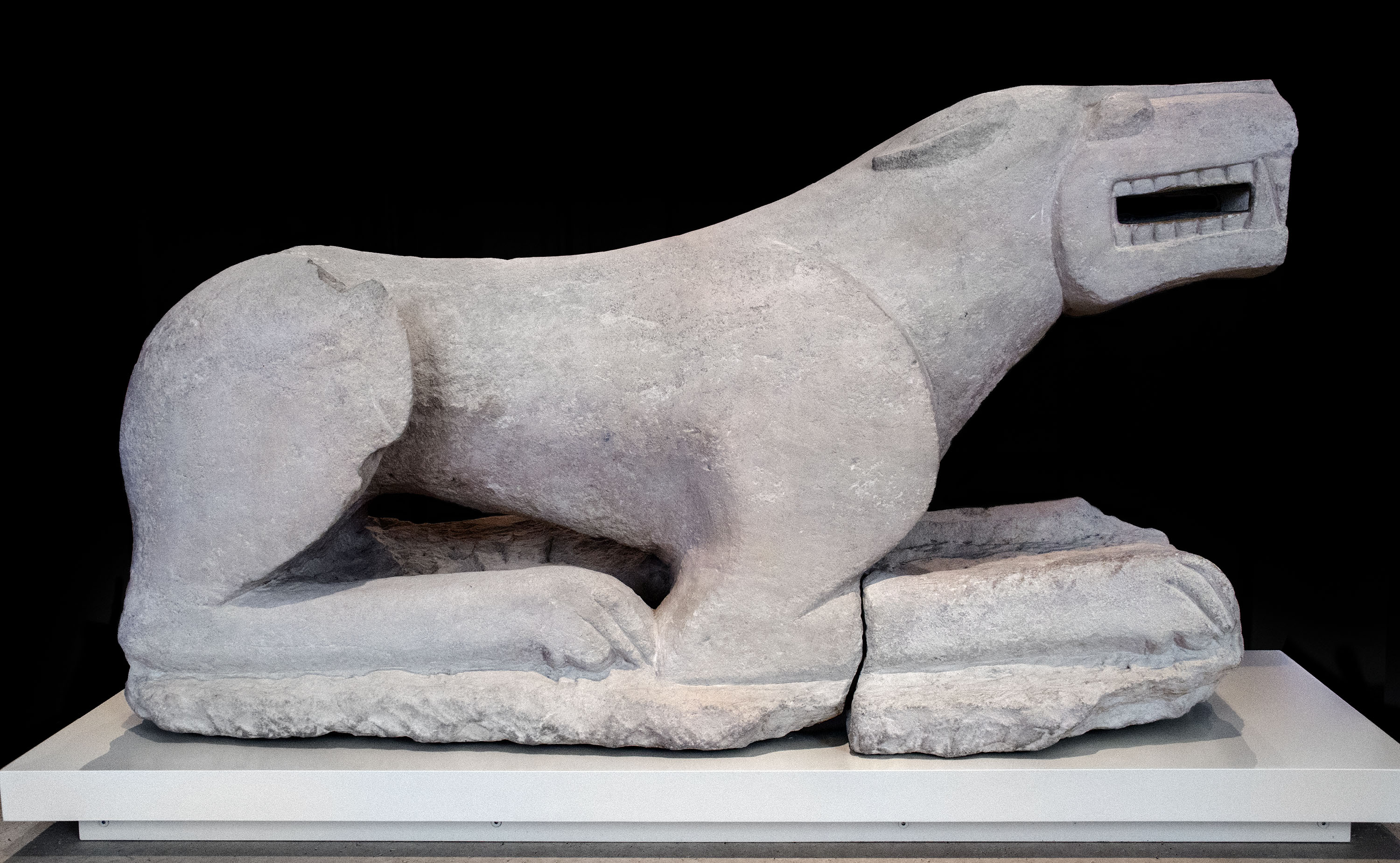
Lioness of Baena

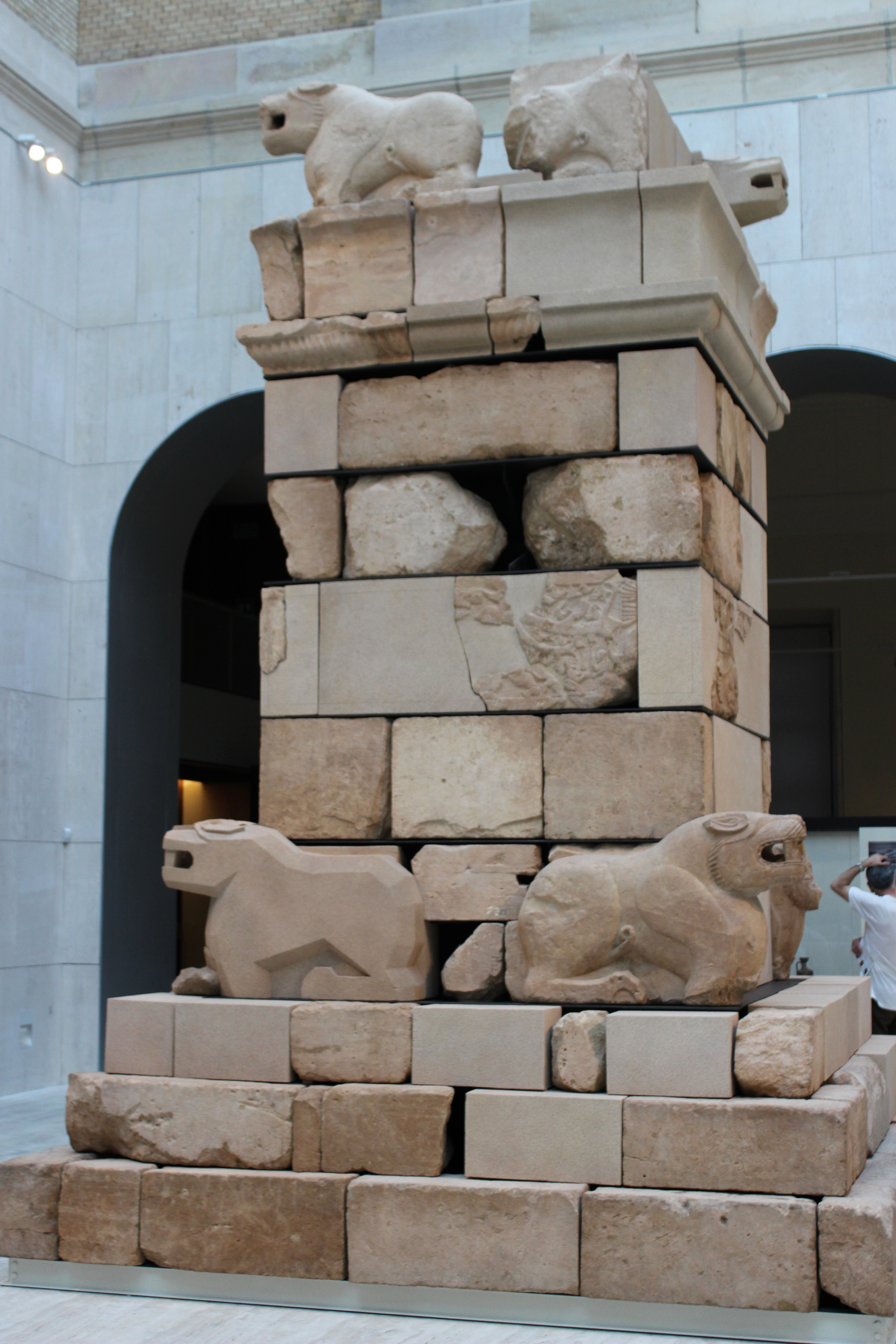
Iberian mausoleum of Pozo Moro.

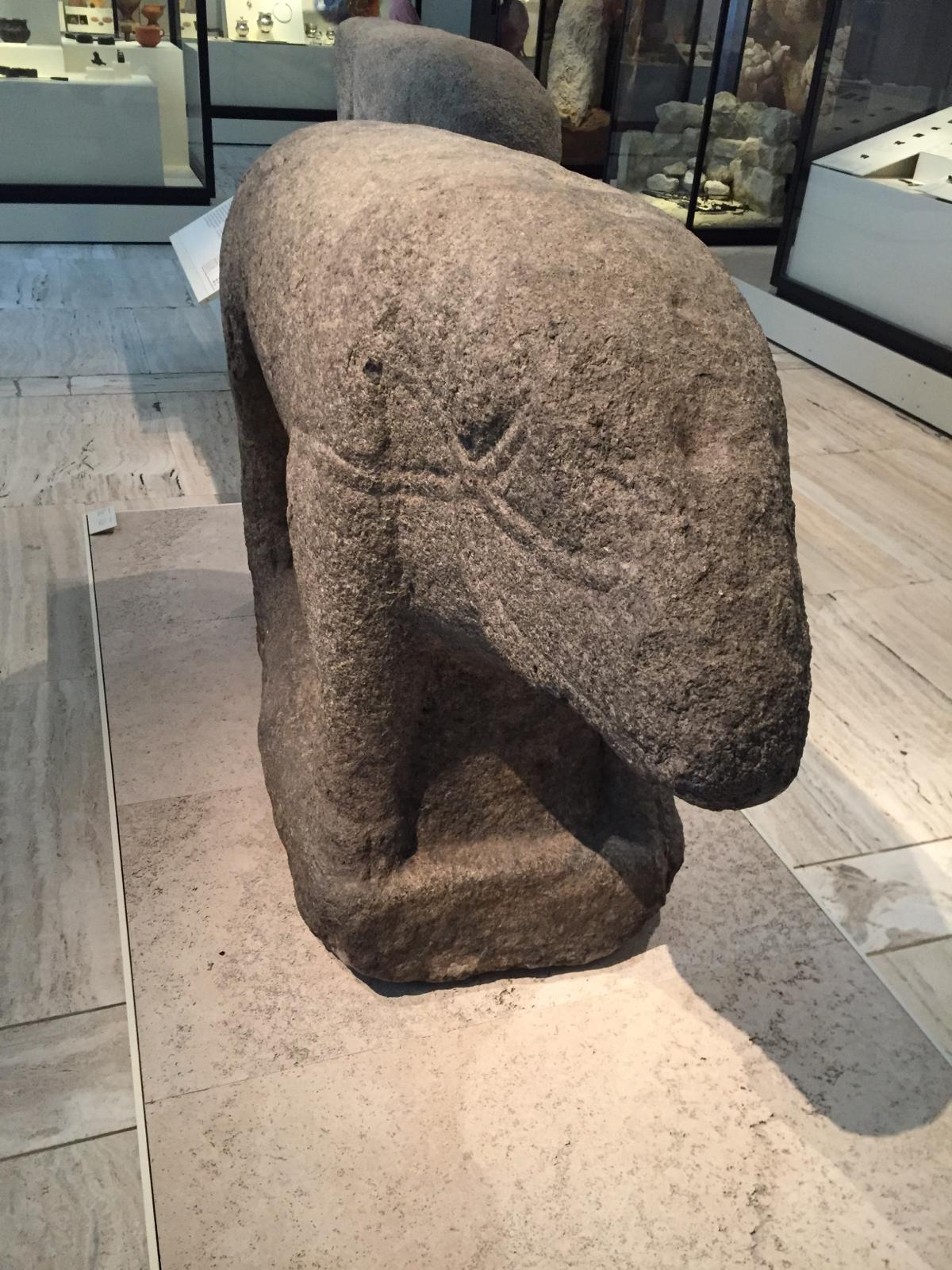
Iberian wild boar

Aside from the set of Iberian sculpture, the area also hosts other items from different cultures, such as the Talaiotic bulls of Costitx, the torque of Ribadeo from the Castro culture in northwestern Iberia, or the Lady of Ibiza, associated to the Punic civilization.

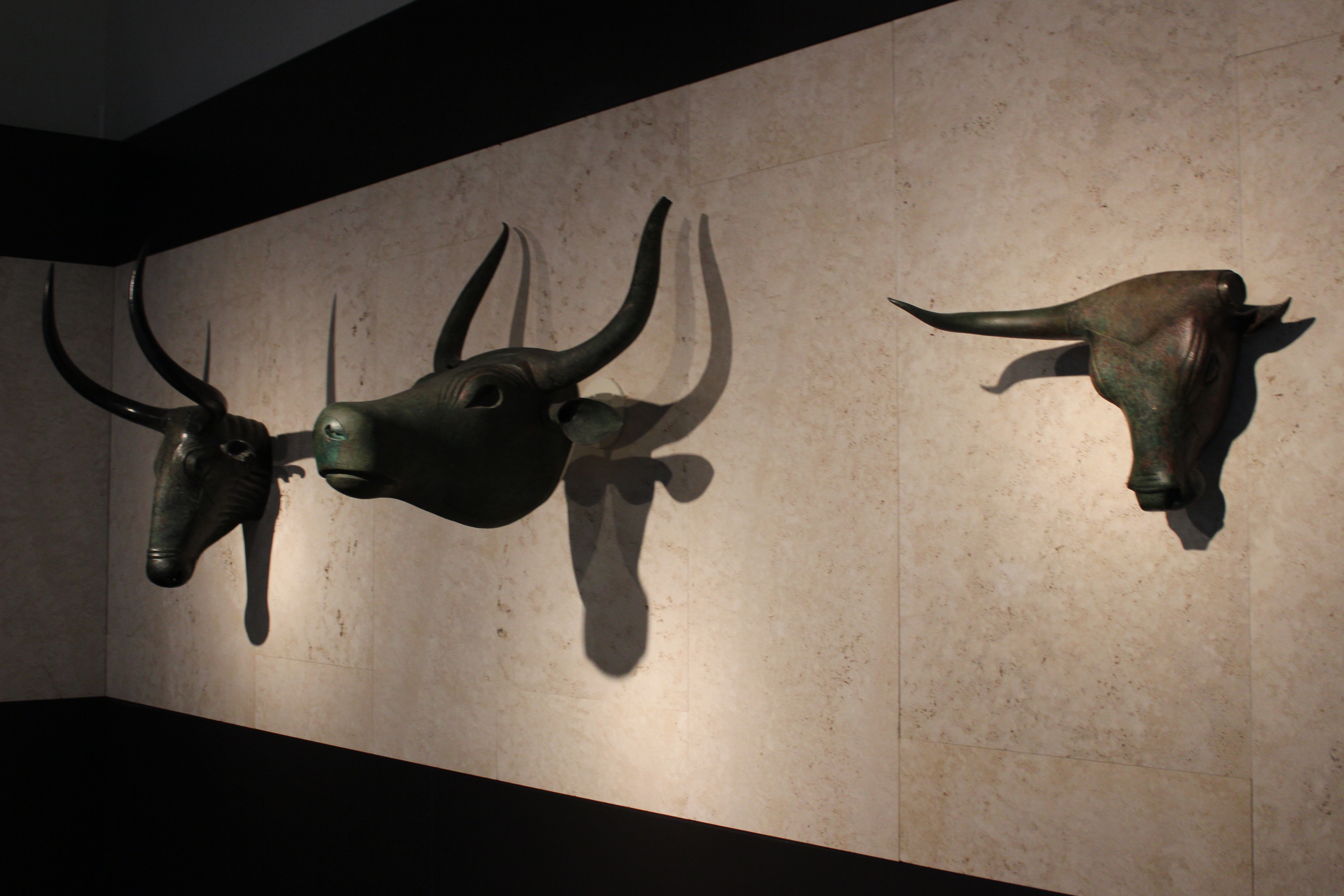
Bull heads of Costitx

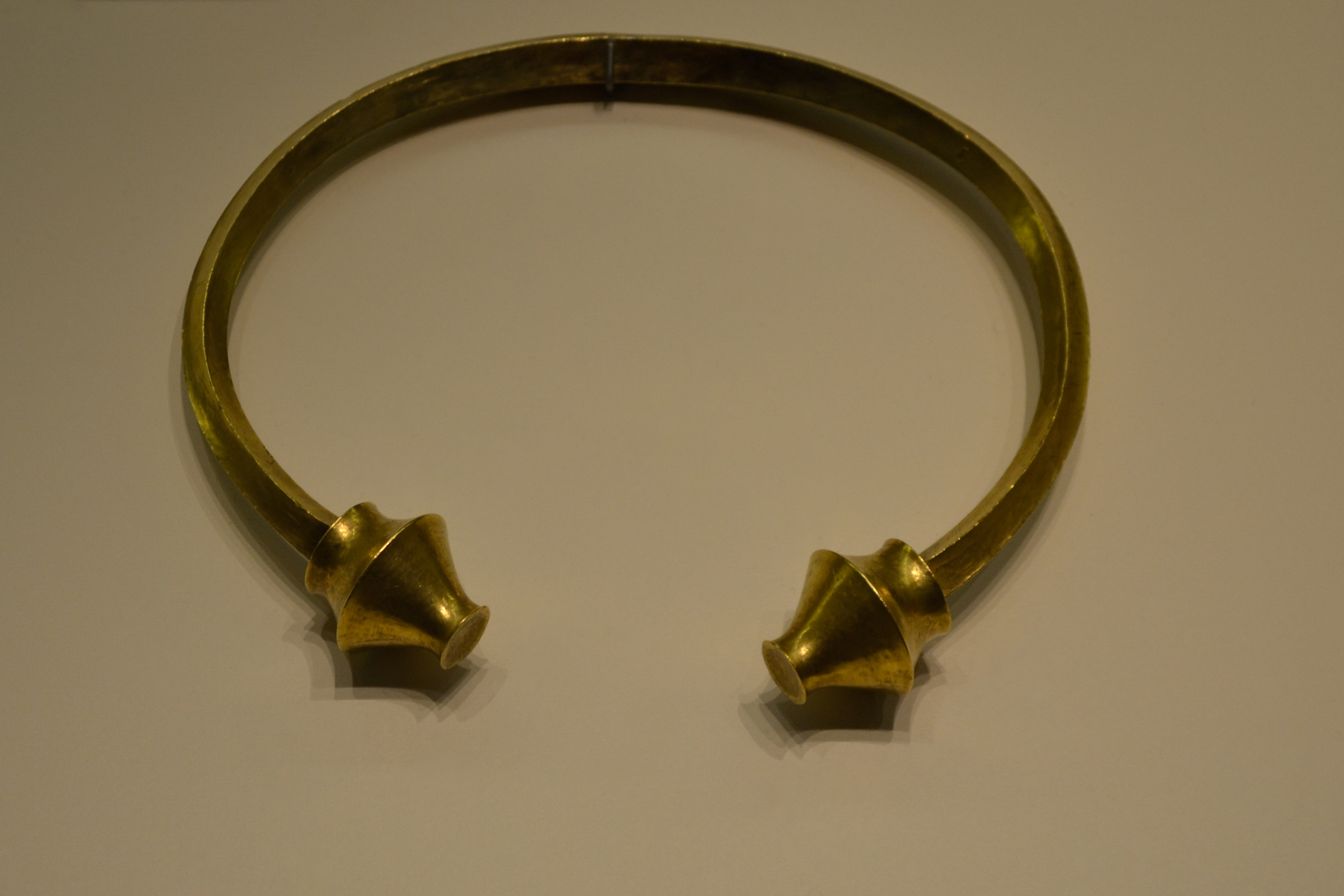
Torque of Ribadeo

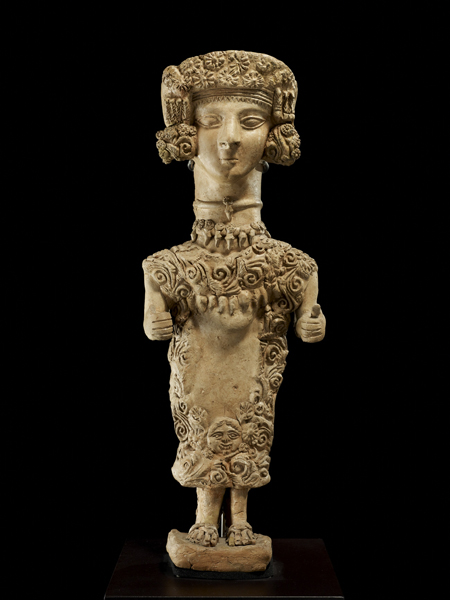
Punic Lady of Ibiza

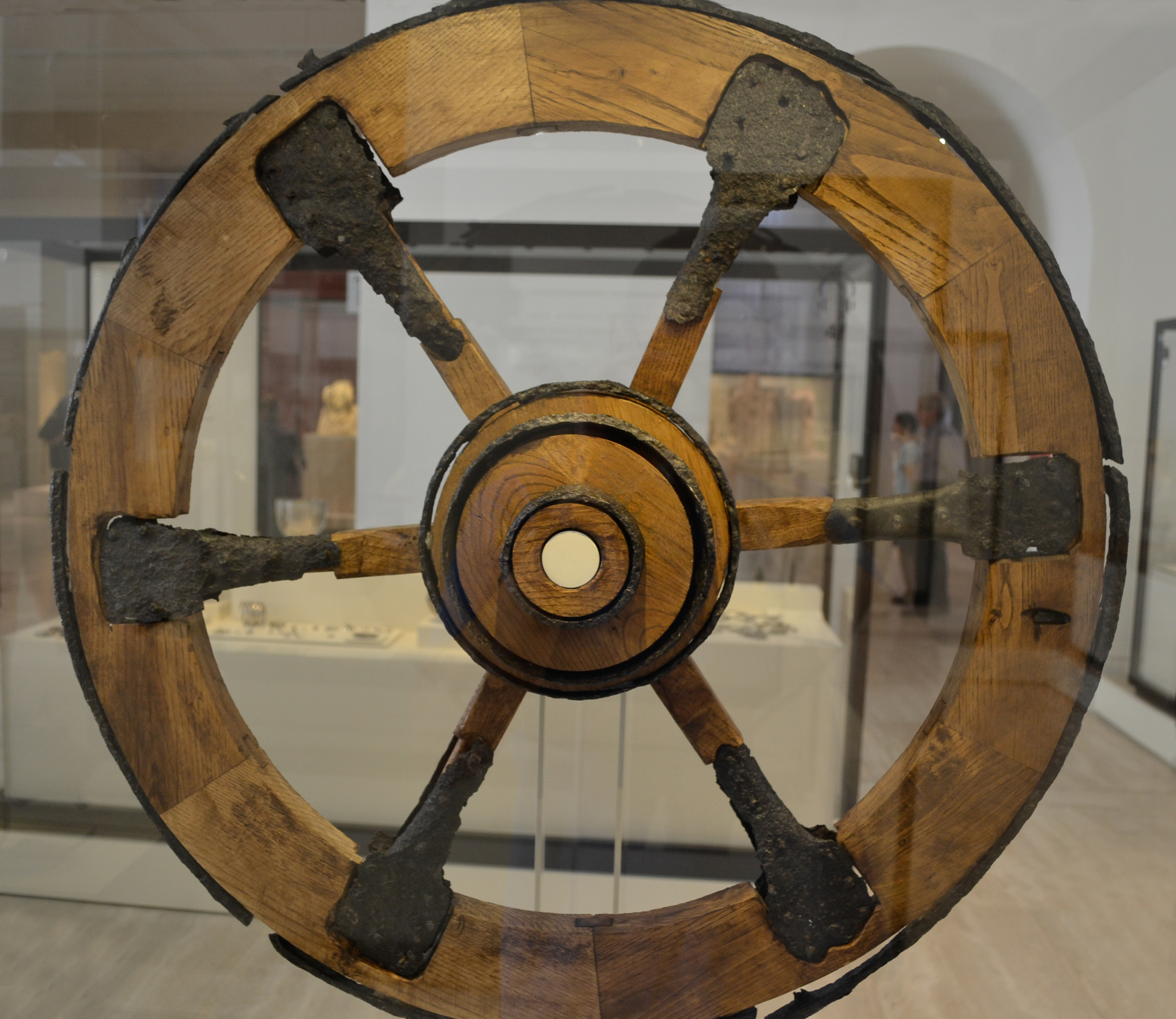
Wheel of Toya

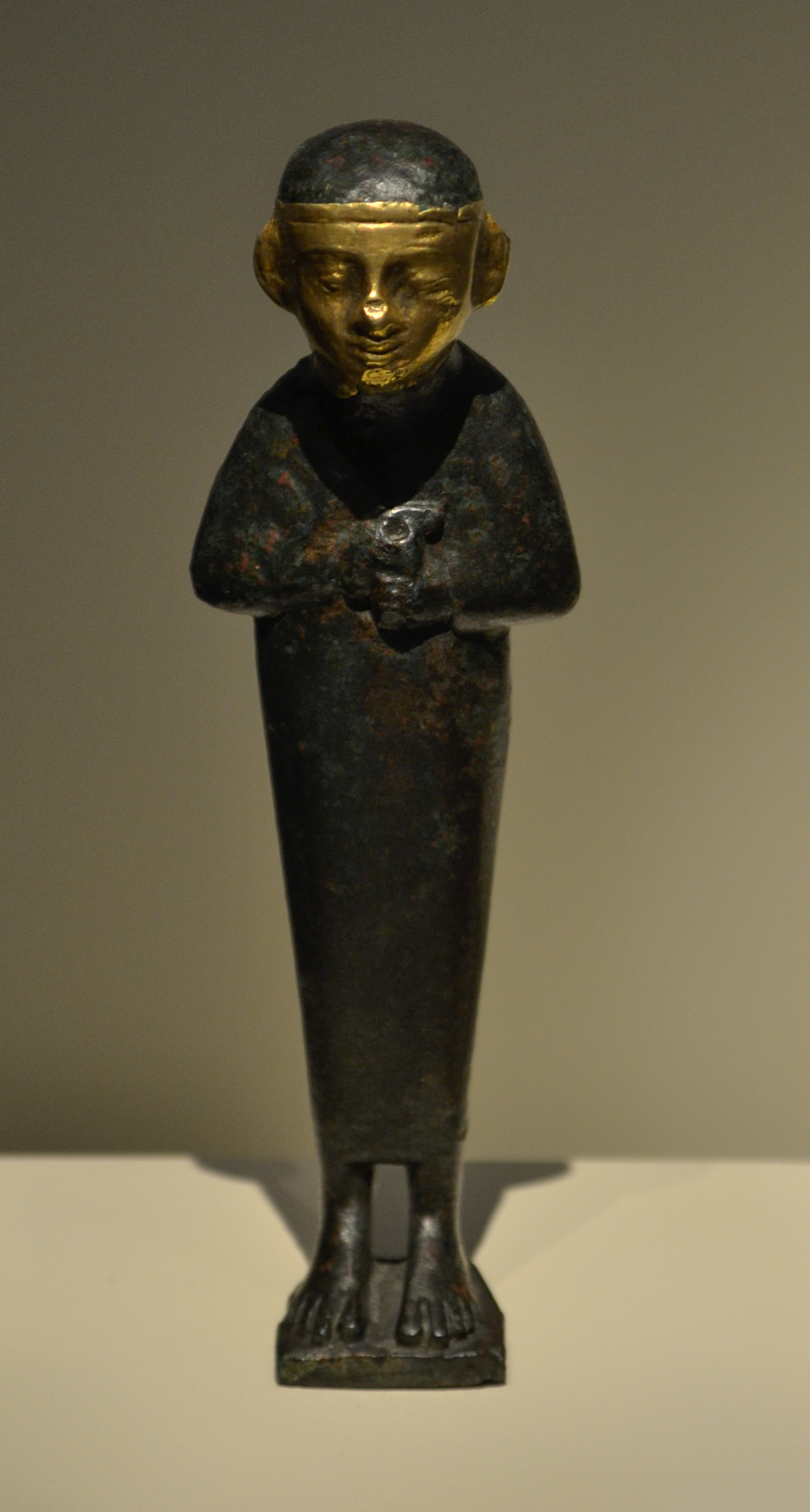
The Priest of Cadiz.

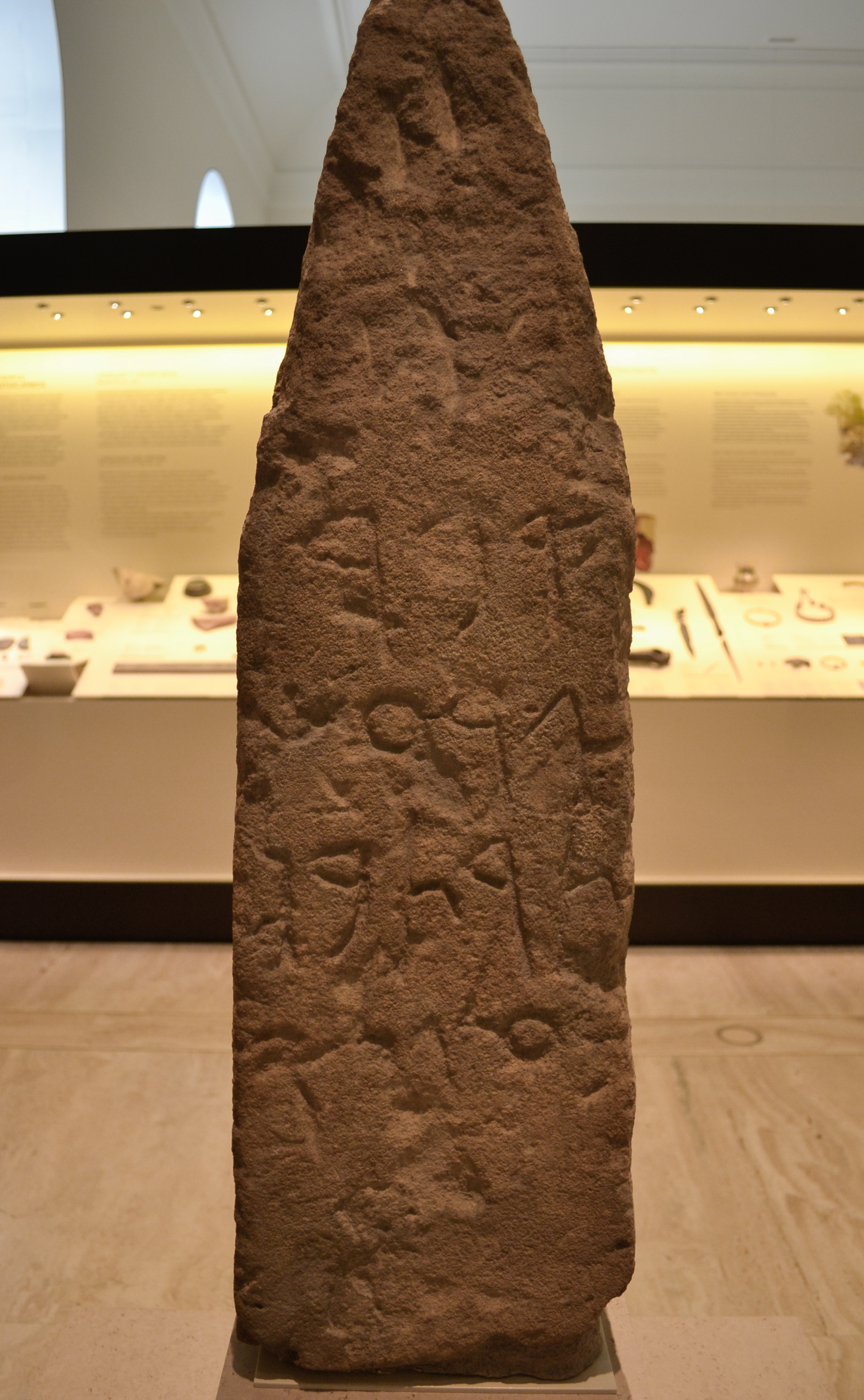
Villaricos Phoenician stele

==== Roman Hispania ====
The collection of Hispano-Roman artifacts—located in the 1st floor—comes both from diggings at specific archaeological sites as well as from punctual purchases. The collection of Roman artifacts is completed by items from the personal collection of the Marquis of Salamanca (purchased in 1874 and comprising artifacts from the Paestum and Cales sites in the Italian Peninsula). The main room of the area is a courtyard, where the artifacts are placed creating a sort of forum-like arrangement. Meanwhile, the room #27 exhibits a number of mosaics both on its floor and walls. The collection of Hispano-Roman legal bronzes includes the Lex Ursonensis, comprising five pieces found in the 1870s in Osuna.

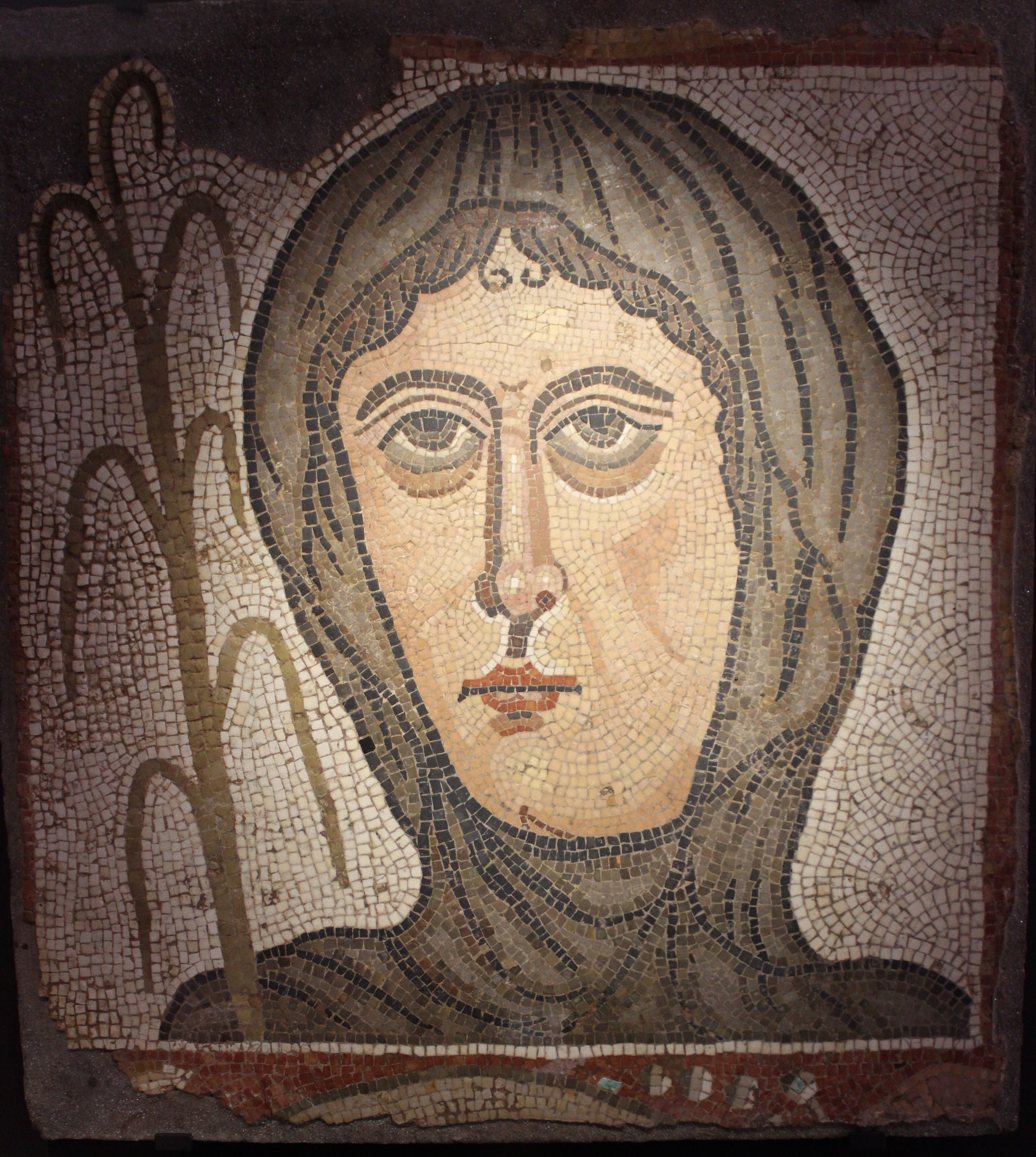
Mosaic of Winter, from Quintana del Marco

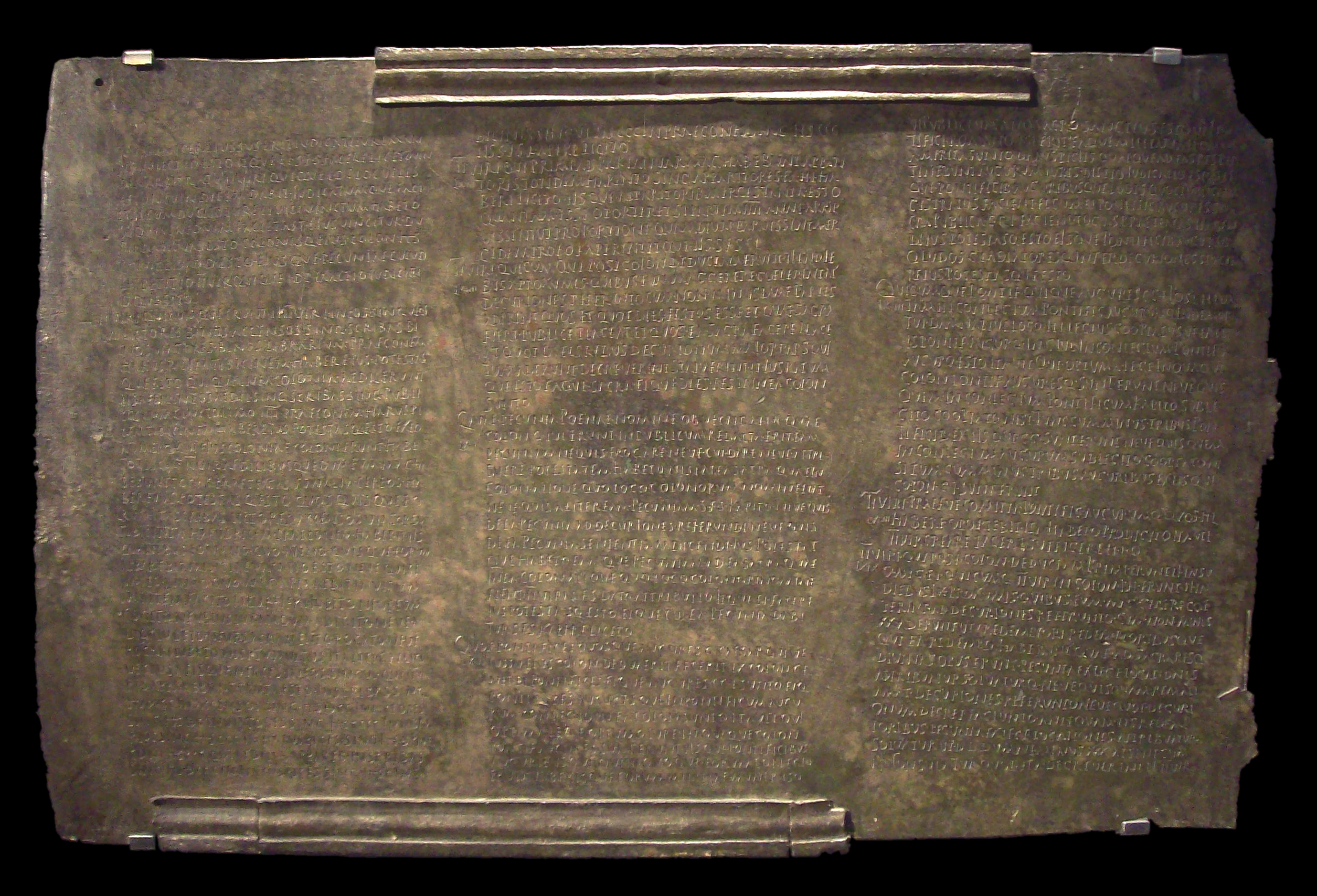
One the slabs part of the Lex Ursonensis

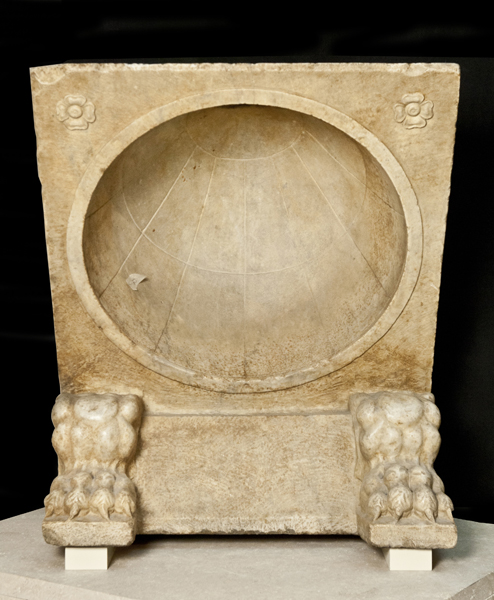
Sundial from Baelo Claudia

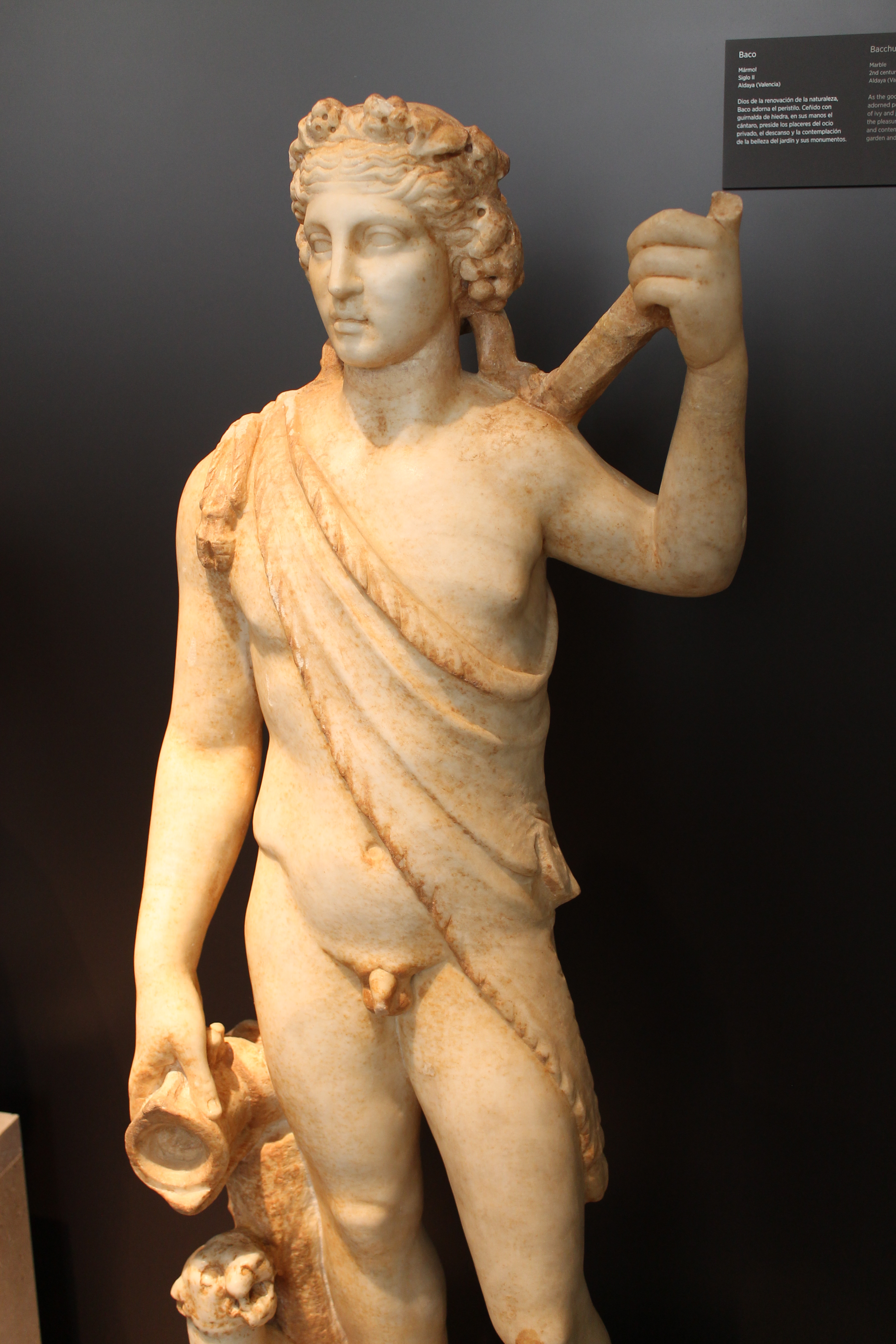
Bacchus of Aldaia

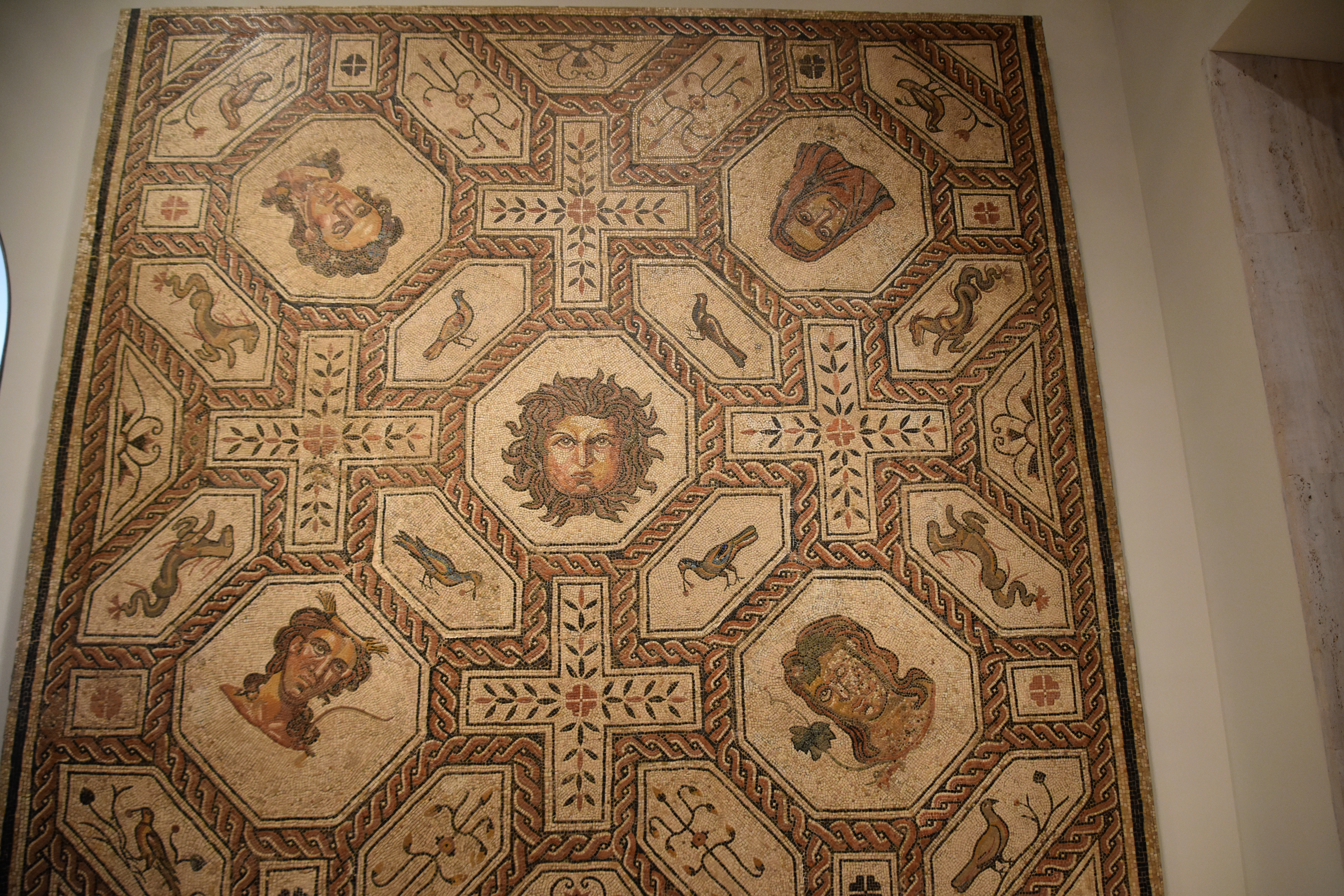
Mosaic of Medusa and the seasons from Palencia

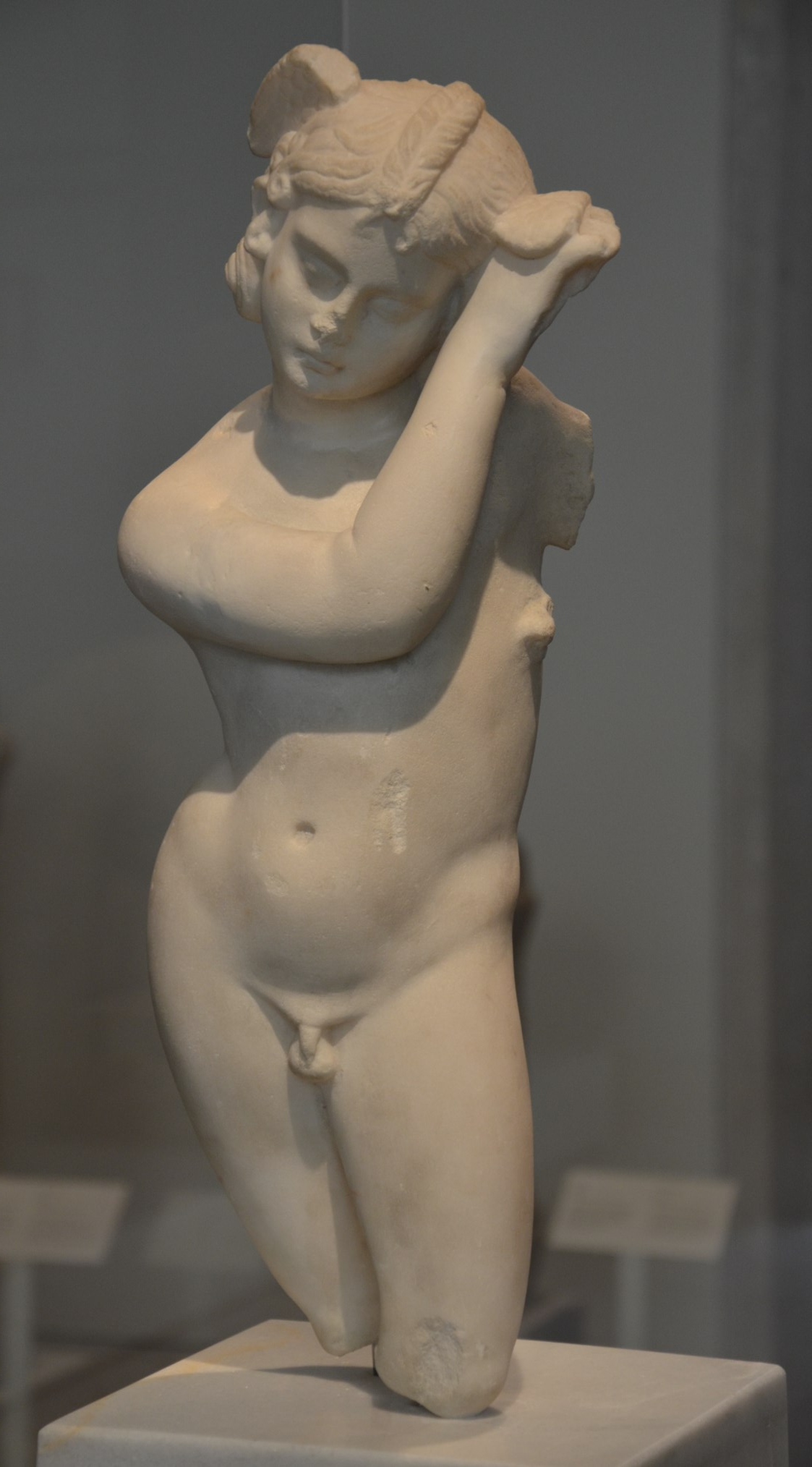
Hypnos from Algorós

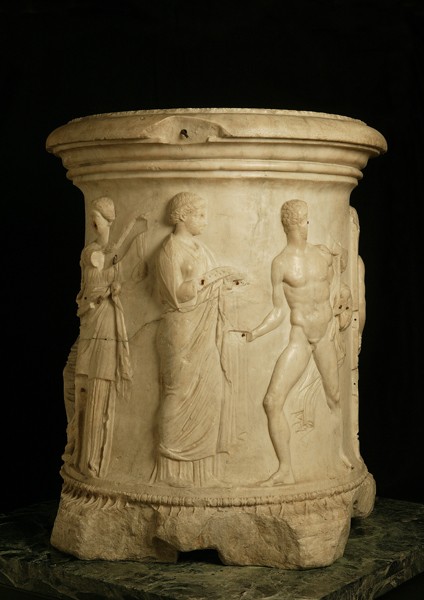
Puteal from La Moncloa

==== Late Antiquity ====
The halls corresponding to the Late Antiquity (1st floor) host pieces related to the period of time corresponding to the Lower Roman Empire in the Iberian Peninsula—the Diocesis Hispaniarum (3rd–5th centuries AD)—, the Visigothic Kingdom of Toledo (6th-8th centuries AD), the Byzantine Empire (5th to 12th centuries AD), as well as some artifacts of other peoples from the Migration Period.

Standout artifacts from this area include the Sarcophagus from Astorga, the Visigothic hoard of Guarrazar, including the votive crown of Recceswinth, or the fibulae from Alovera.

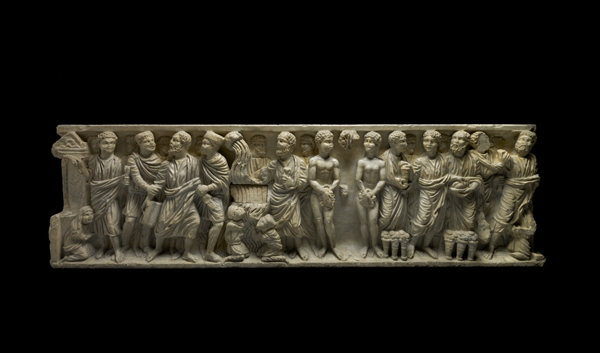
Paleochristian sarcophagus from Astorga

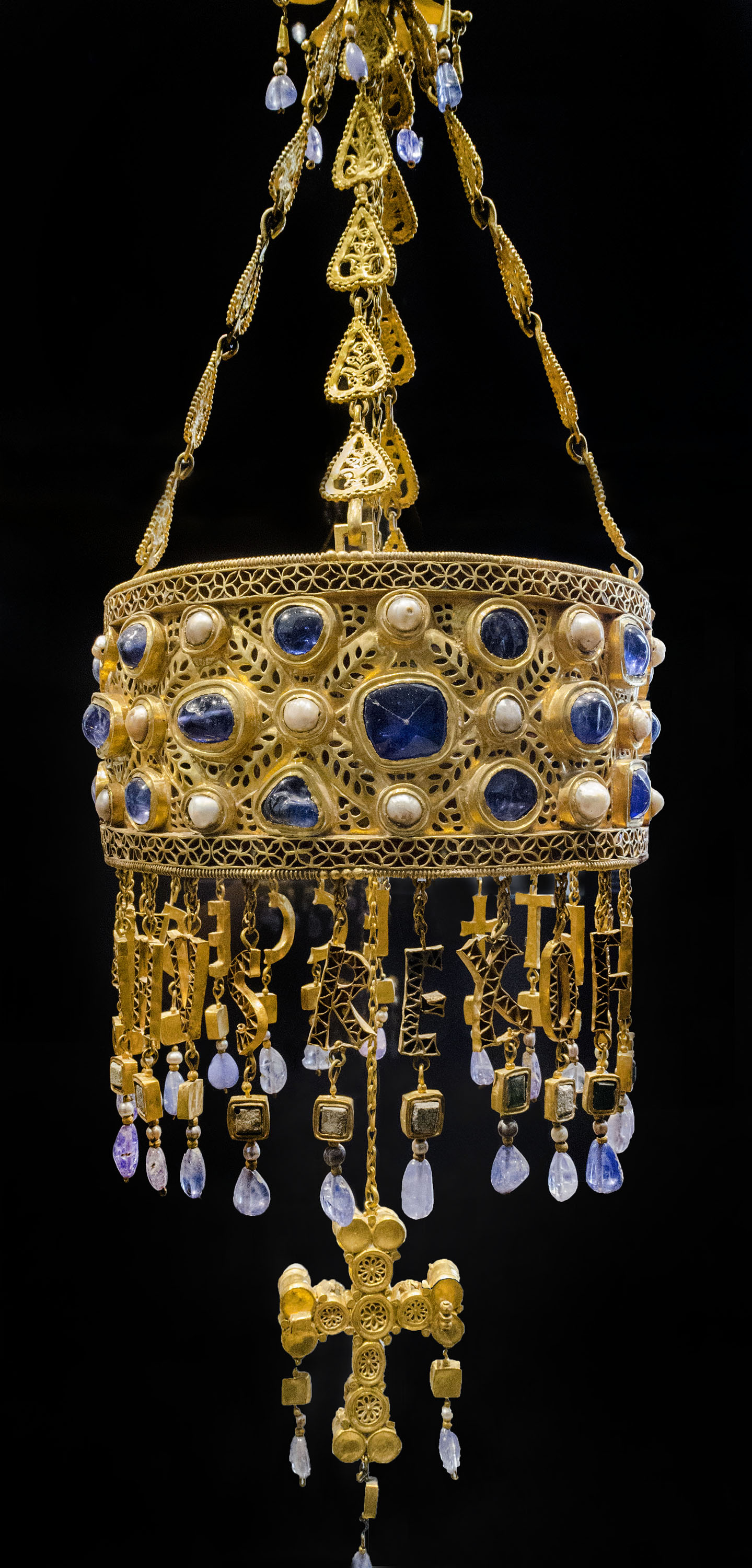
Votive crown of Recceswinth

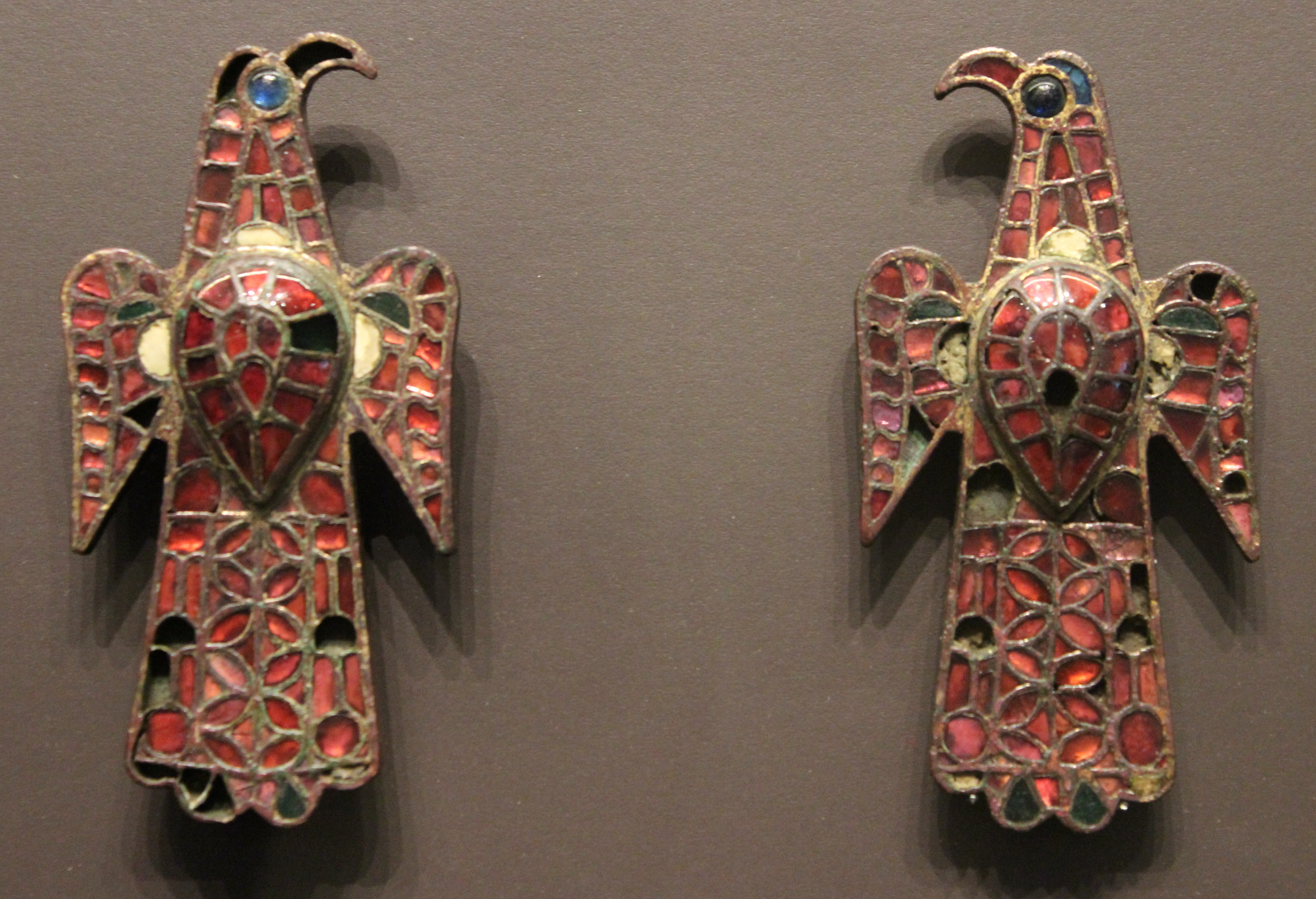
Eagle-like fibulae from Alovera

==== Medieval World, al-Andalus ====
The area dedicated to al-Andalus is located in the 1st floor. Iconic pieces from al-Andalus include the pyxis of Zamora (actually made in Medina Azahara), the deer-like fountain source of Medina Azahara or the marble font for ablutions of Almanzor. A Jewish bilingual chapitel from Toledo is also exhibited. Two items of the so-called Alhambra vases stand out within the collection of Nasrid pottery.

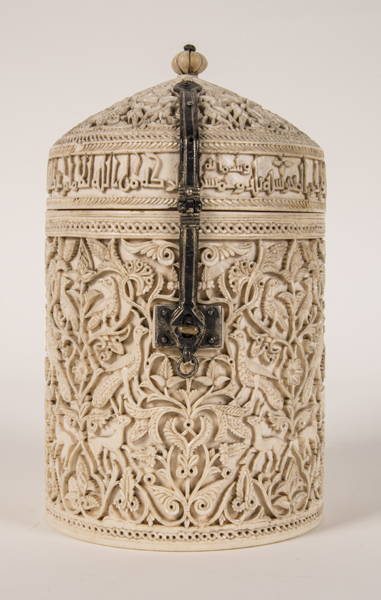
Pyxis of Zamora

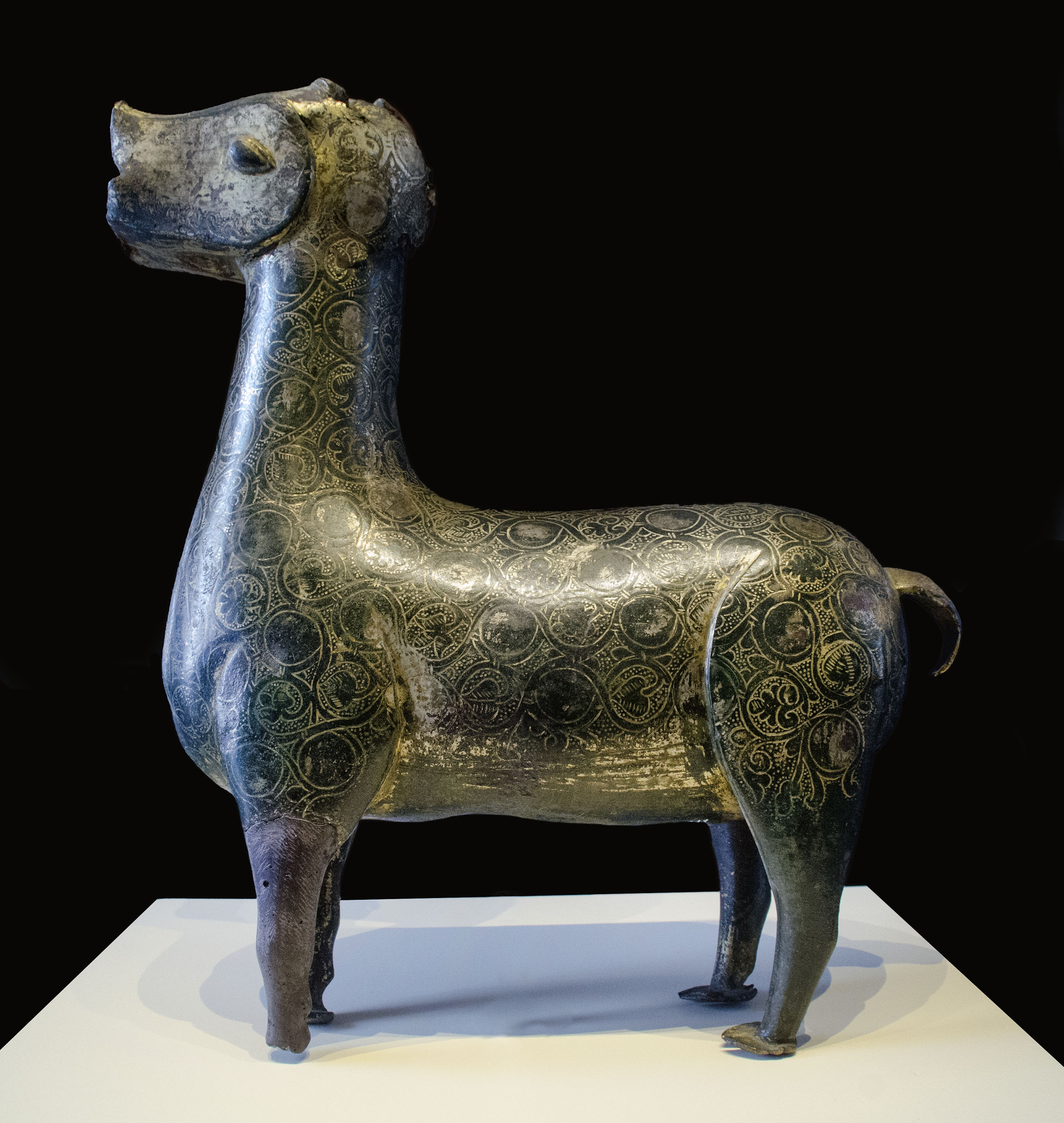
The deer of Medina Azahara, a bronze fountain

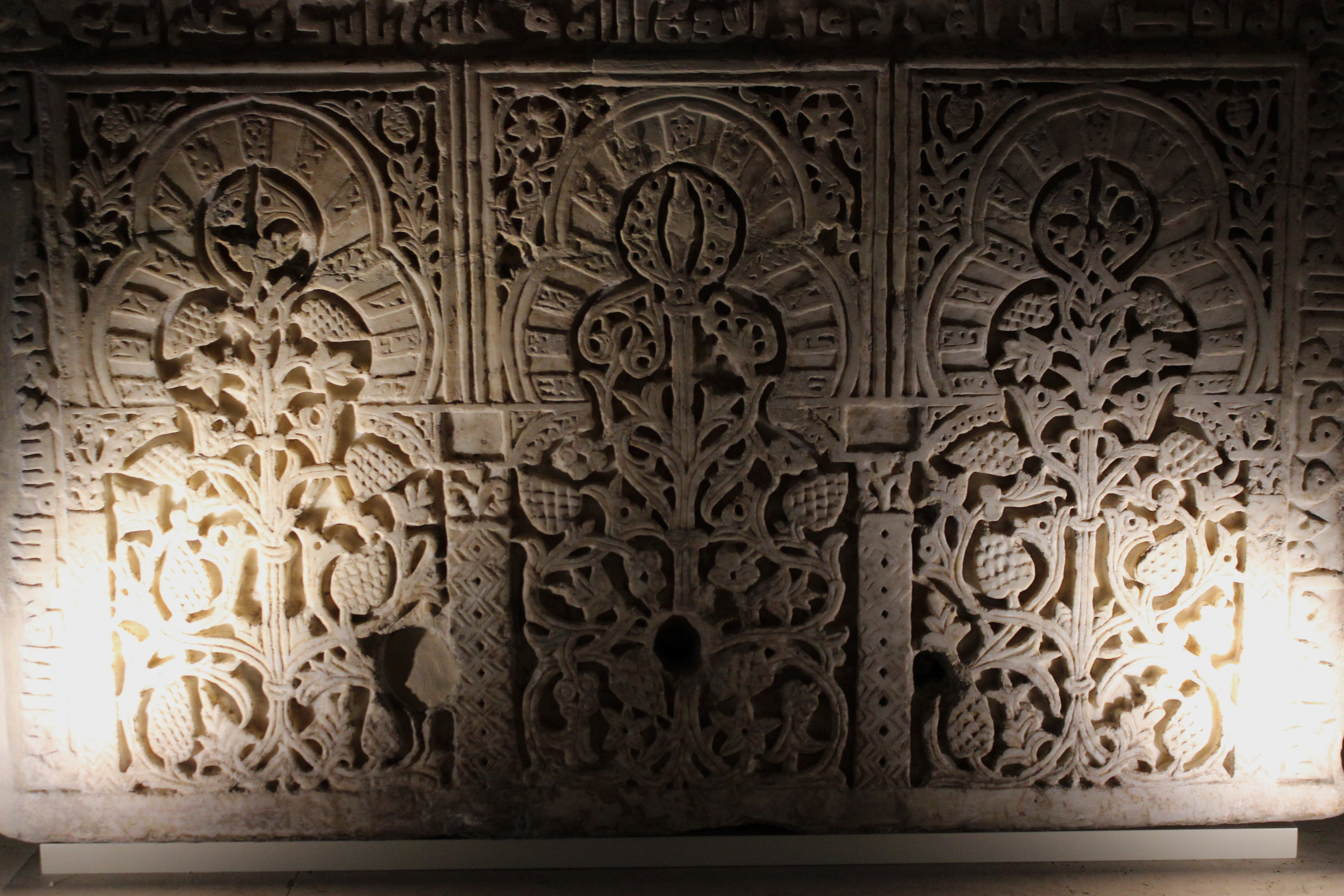
Ablution font of Medina Alzahira

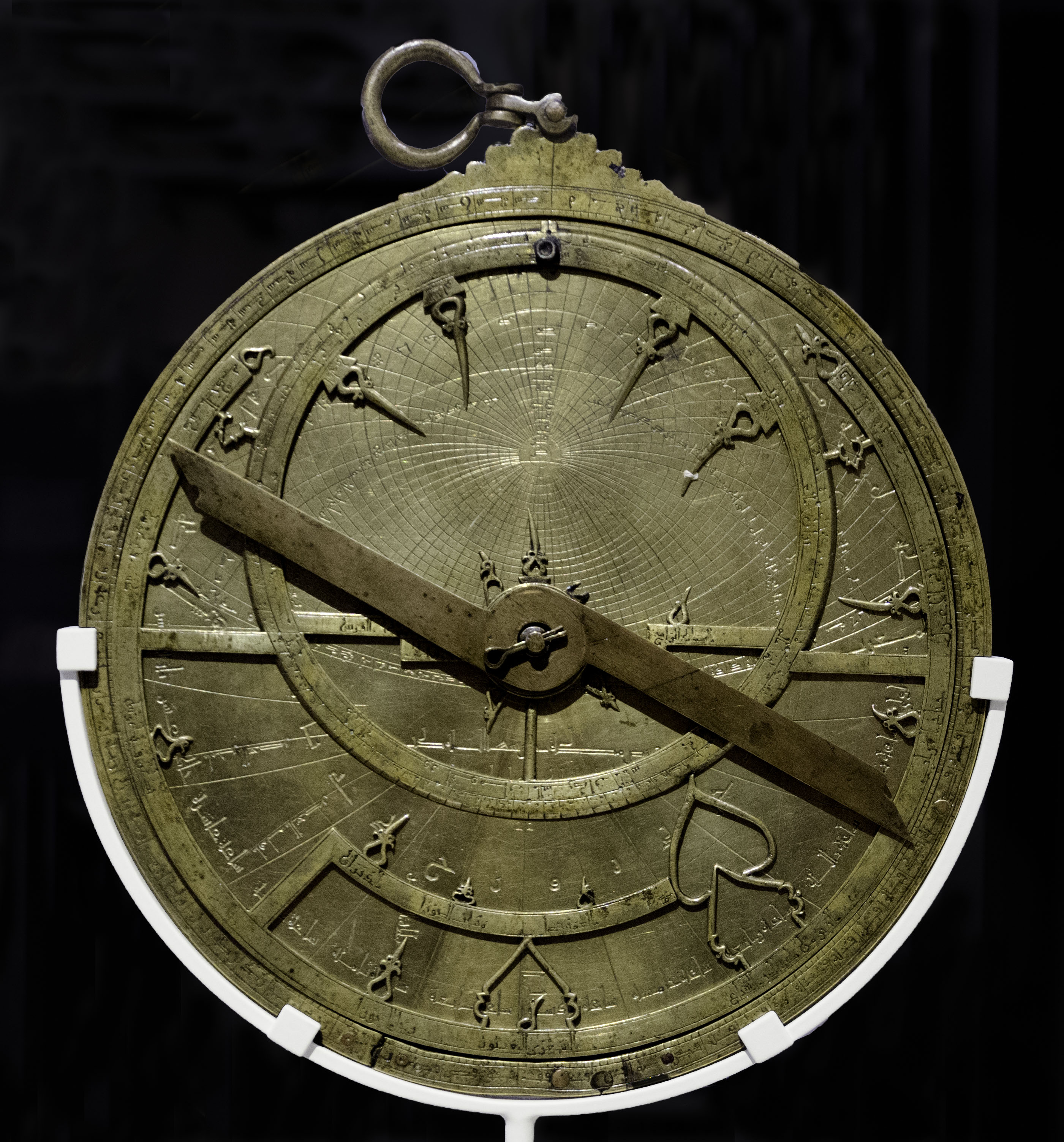
Astrolabe of ibn Said, made in 1067 in Toledo by Ibrahim ibn Said al-Sahli

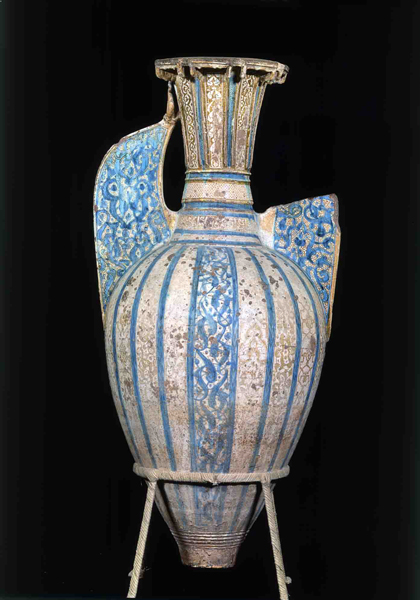
One of the Alhambra vases

==== Medieval World, Christian kingdoms ====
The area dedicated to the medieval Christian Kingdoms (roughly ranging from the 8th to the 15th century) is located in the 2nd floor. Iconic pieces of Romanesque ivory craftsmanship include the Arca de las Bienaventuranzas and the Crucifix of Ferdinand and Sancha. The medieval collection features the praying statue of Peter I of Castile, made in alabaster and moved from the former convent of Santo Domingo el Real in Madrid to the National Museum of Archaeology in 1868. It also displays a number of items of Levantine pottery.

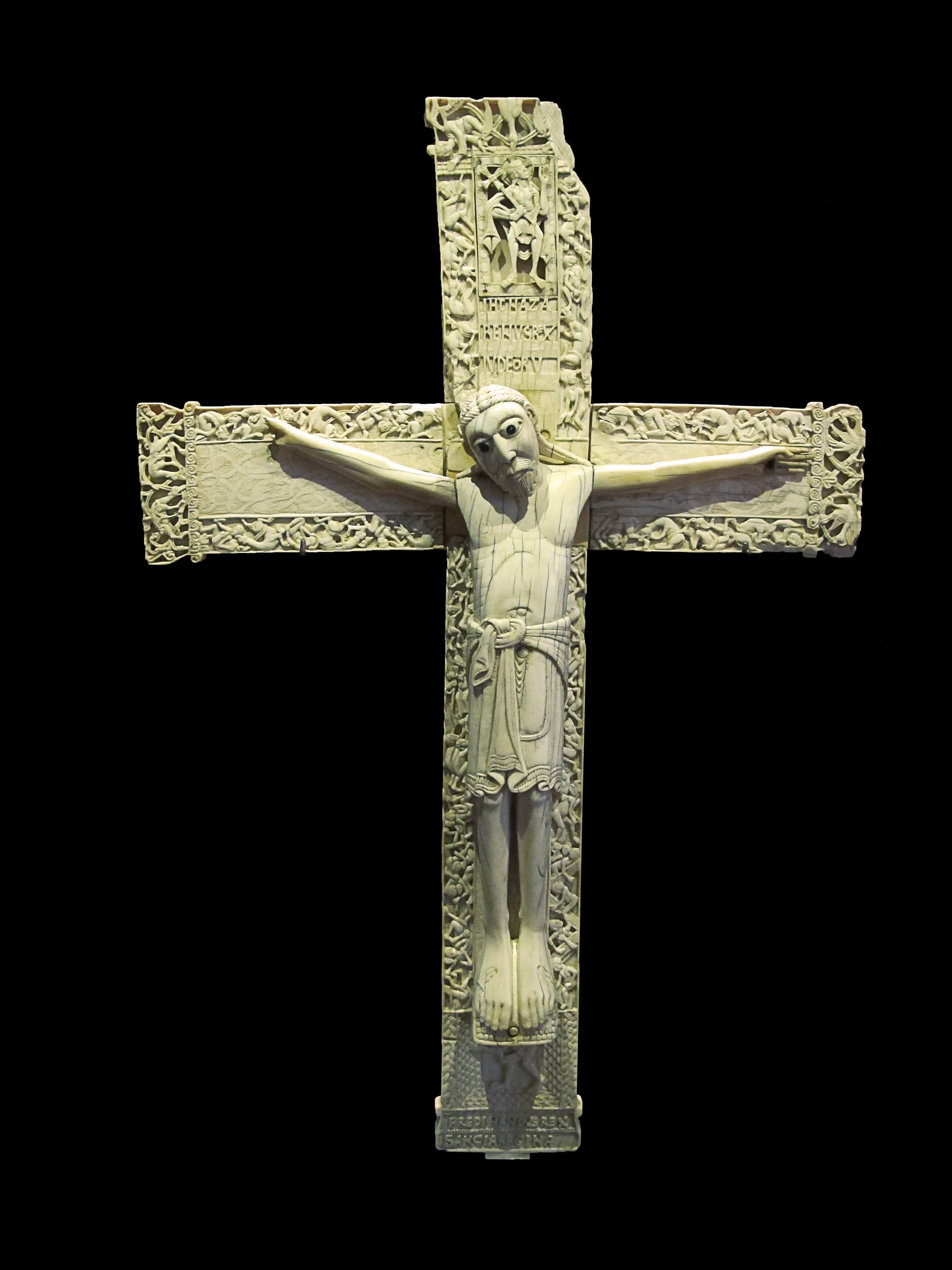
Crucifix of Ferdinand and Sancha

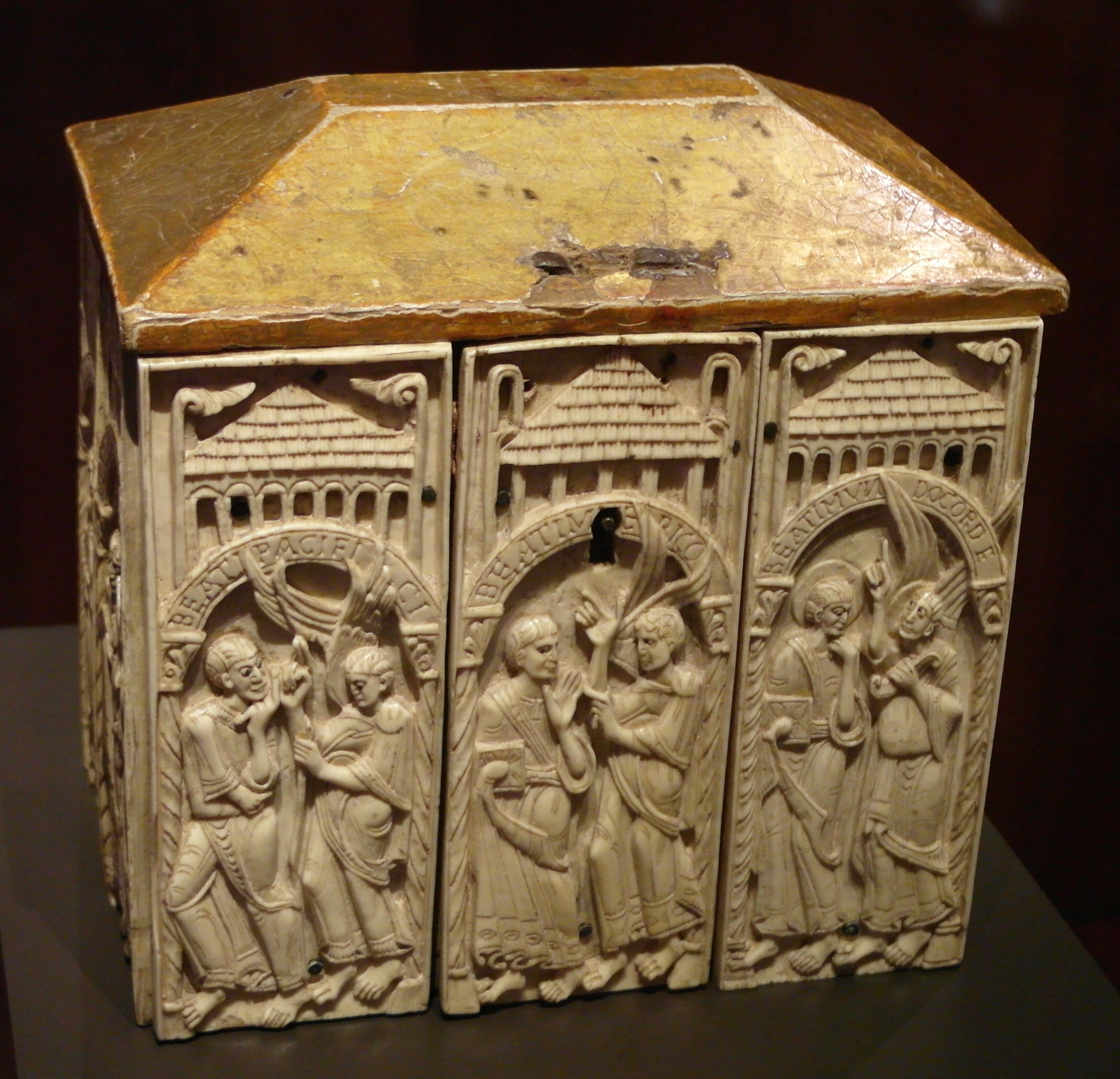
Arca de las Bienaventuranzas

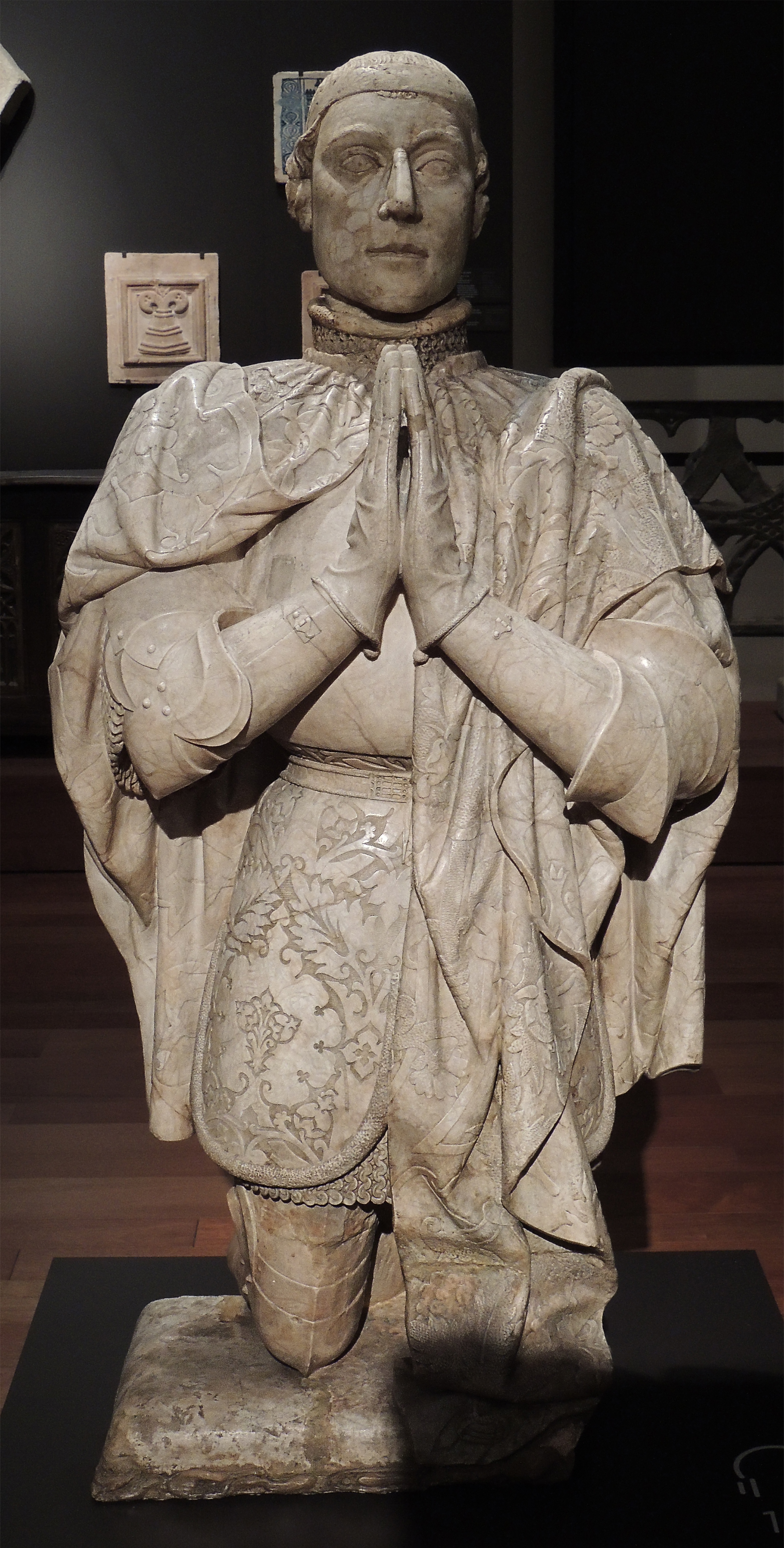
praying statue of Peter I of Castile

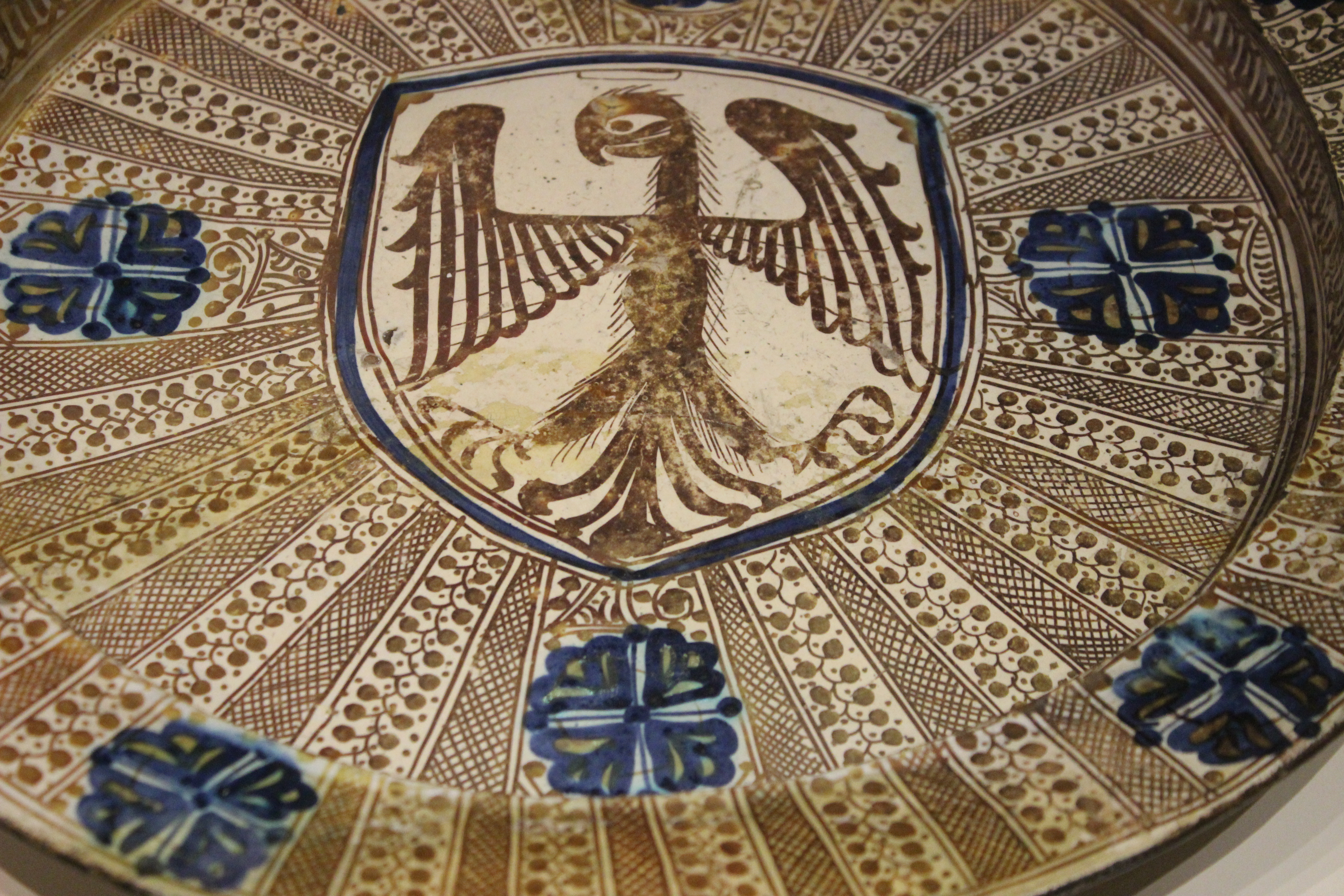
Pottery from Manises

==== Near East ====
The topic area devoted to the Ancient Near East (conventionally excluding Ancient Egypt) is located at the 2nd floor. One of the most important sets of the MAN's Near East collection is that of pottery from Iran. The museum displays a diorite head from Mesopotamia donated to the Prado Museum in the 1940s by the Mexican collector Marius de Zayas (later deposited in the MAN). 21st century purchases include that of the Praying Sumerian figure bought at Christie's in 2001.

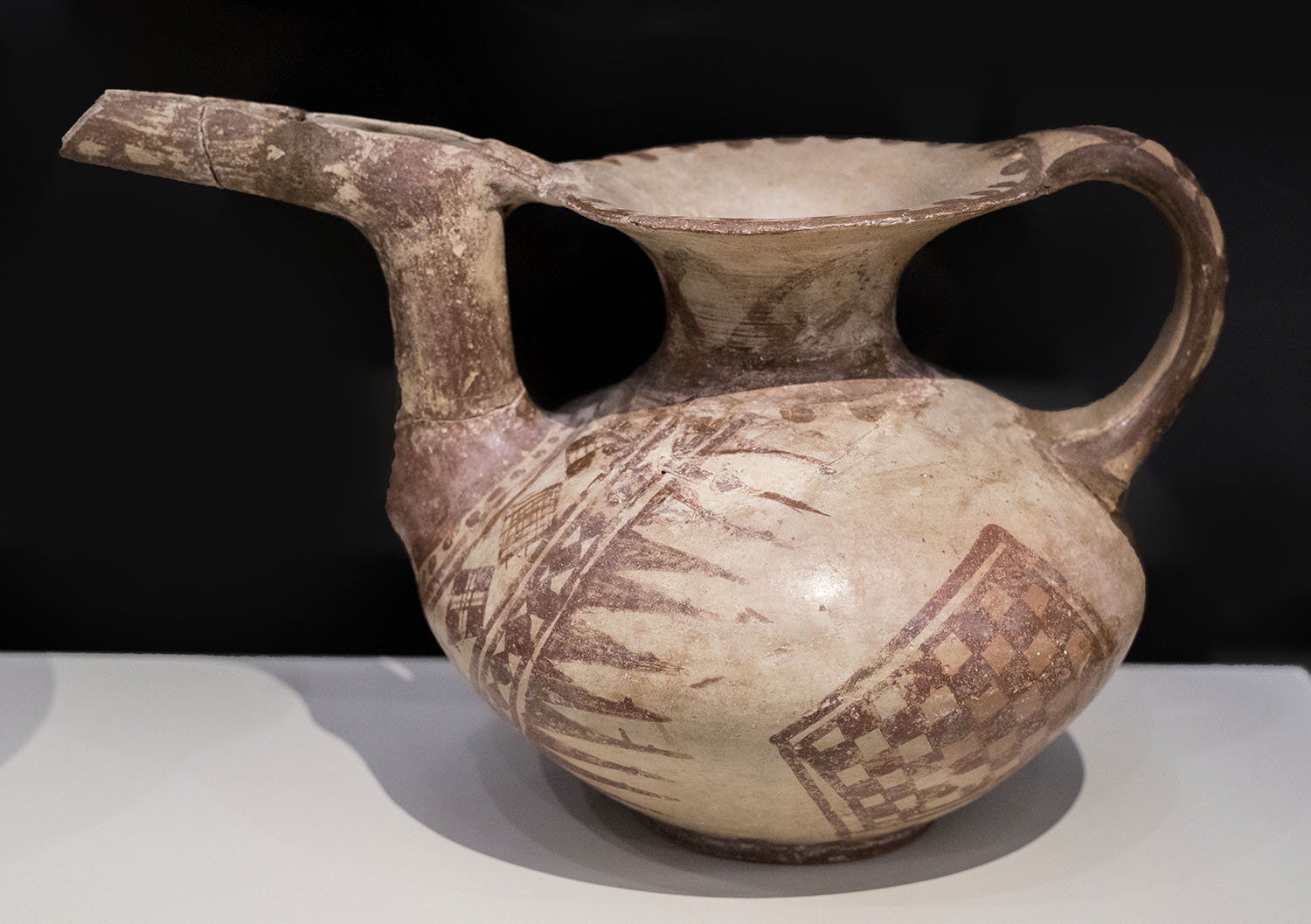
Pottery from Tepe Sialk

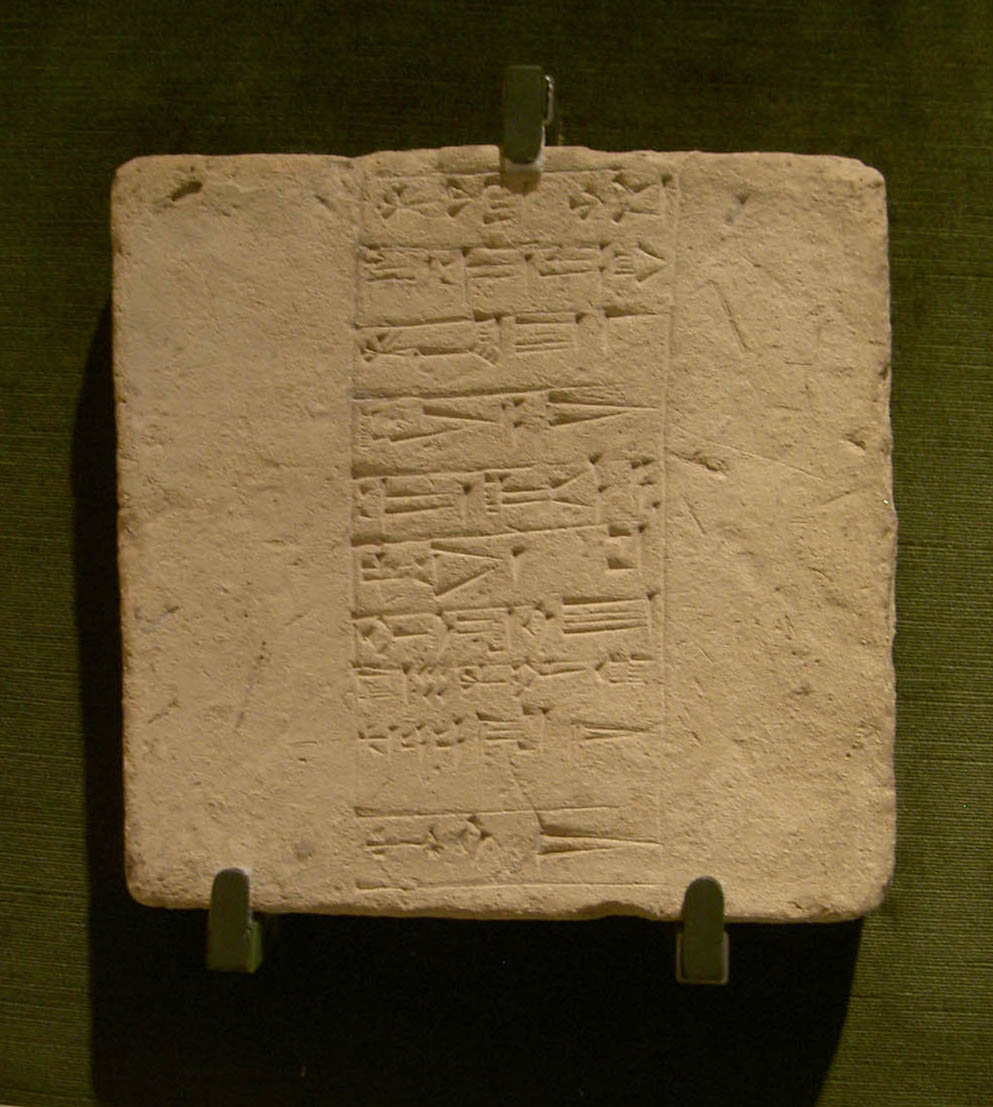
Brick from Girsu displaying cuneiform writing

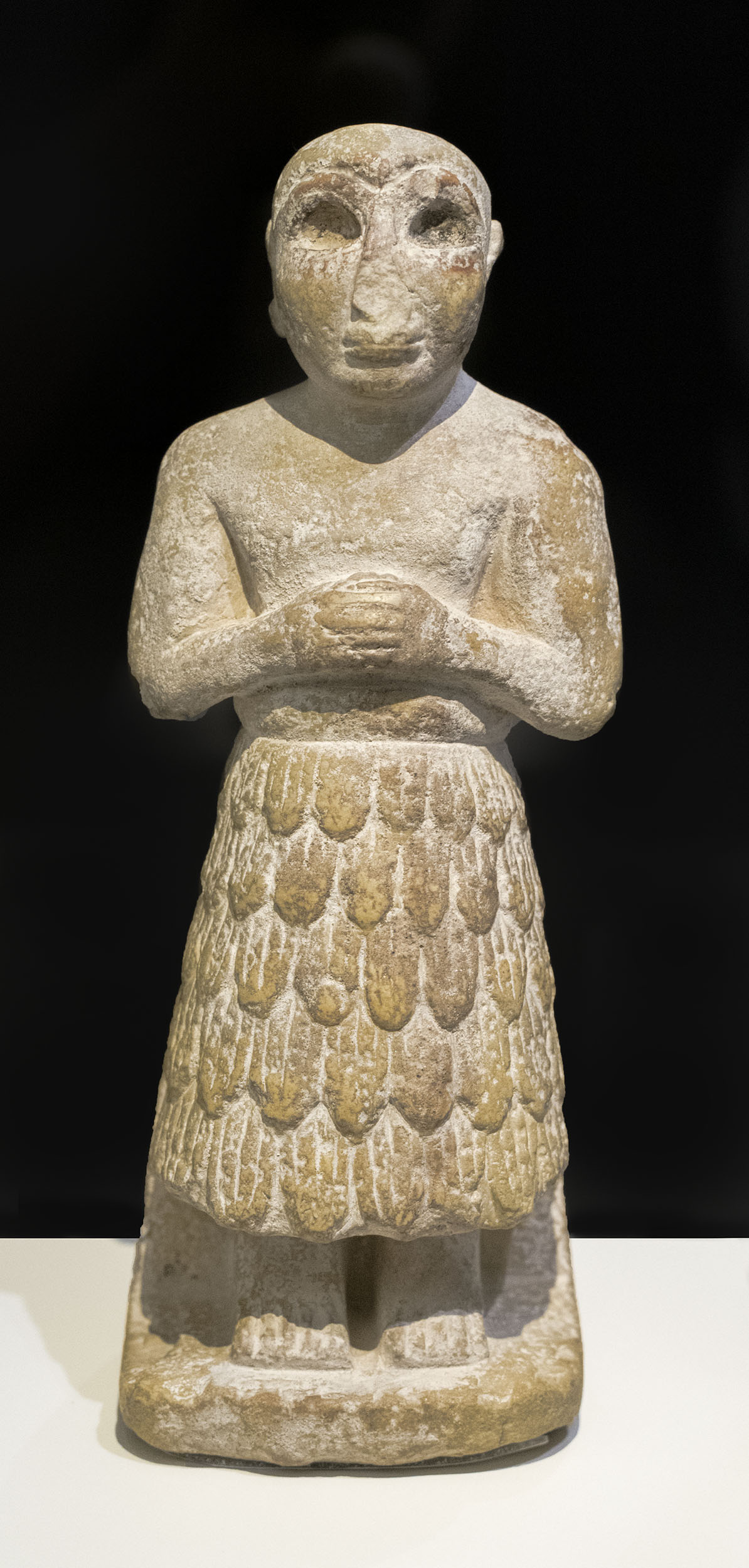
Praying Sumerian figure

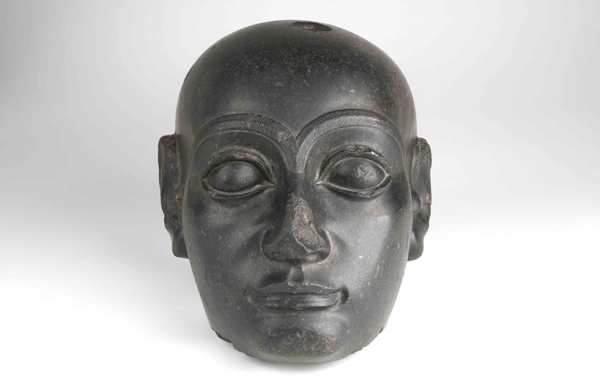
Head of Gudea (Lagash period)

==== Egypt and Nubia ====
The collections of Egypt and Nubia are made up mainly of funerary funds (amulets, mummies, steles, sculpture of divinities, ushabti...) ranging from prehistory to Roman and medieval times. Many of the pieces come from purchases such as the one made from the collection of the Spanish Egyptologist Eduardo Toda y Güell and also from various excavations such as the ones carried in Egypt and Sudan as a result of the agreements with the Egyptian government for the construction of the Aswan Dam or the systematic excavations in Heracleopolis Magna.

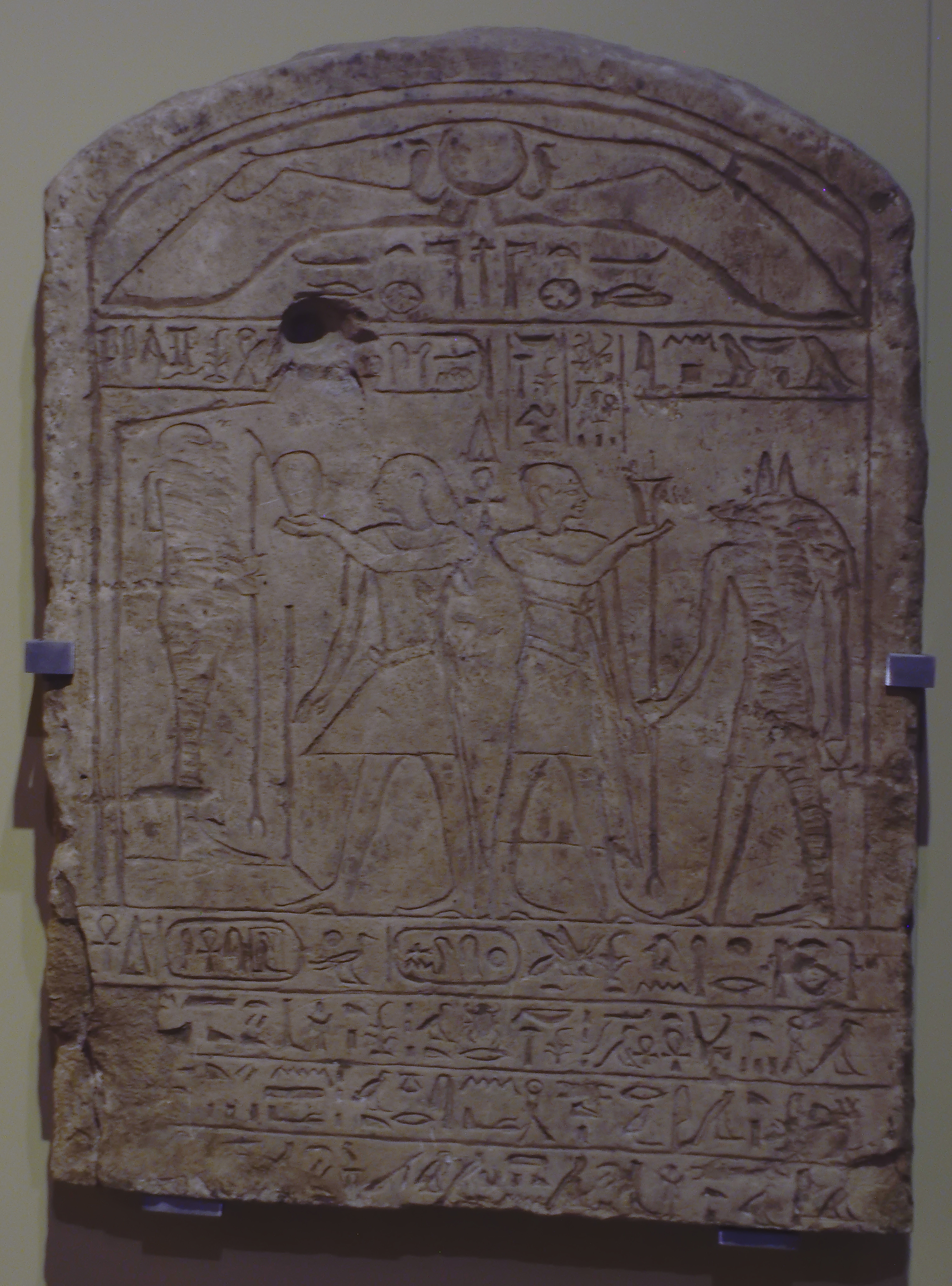
Stele of Nebsumenu from the Second Intermediate Period (1650–1550 BC)

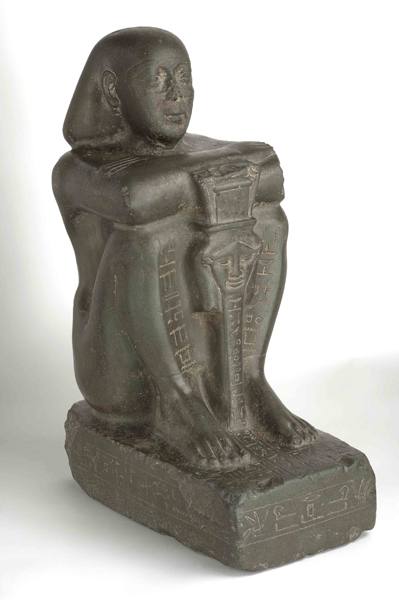
Basalt sculpture of Harsomtus em hat from the twenty-sixth Dynasty of Egypt.

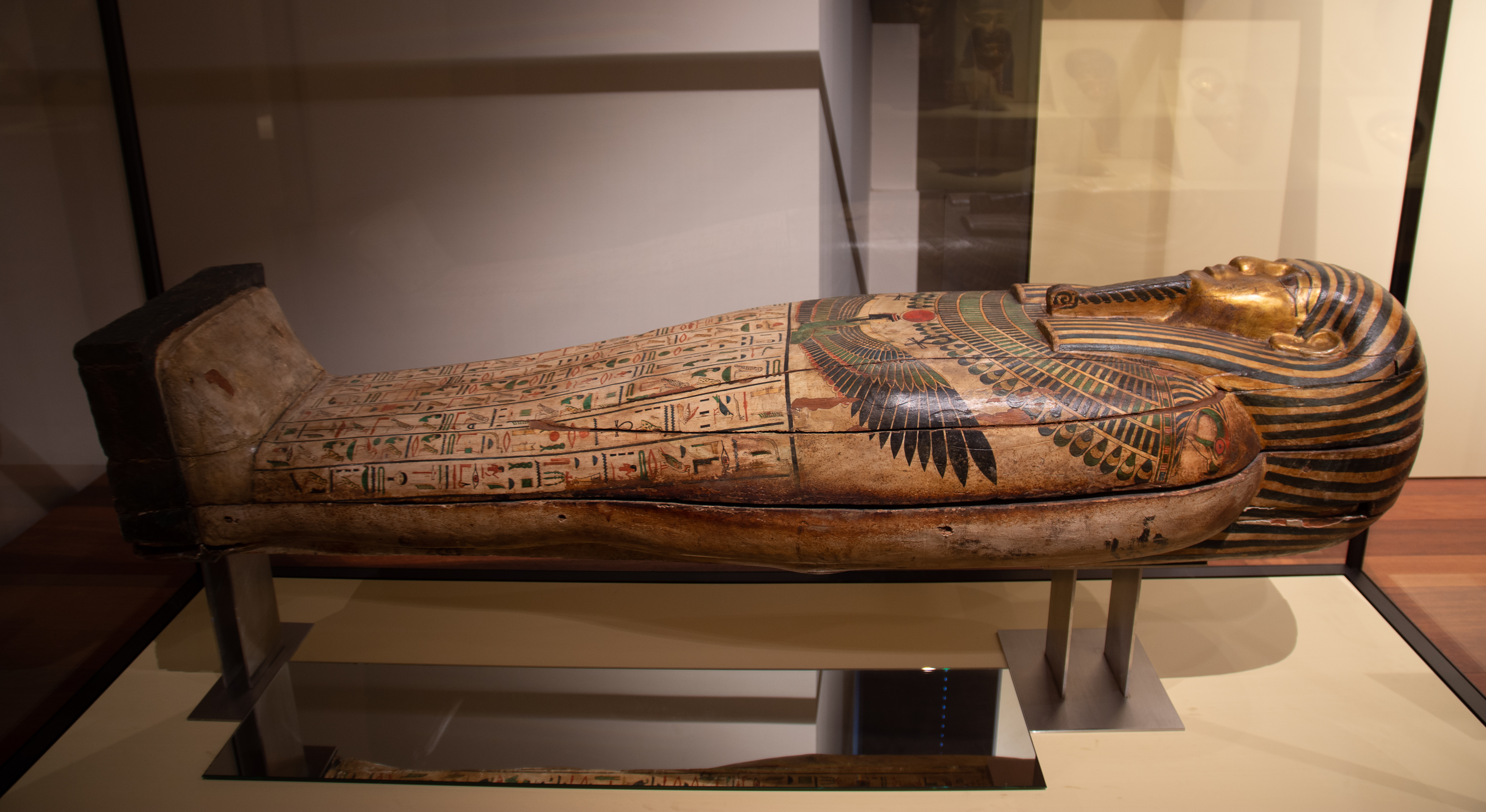
Late period sarcophagus.

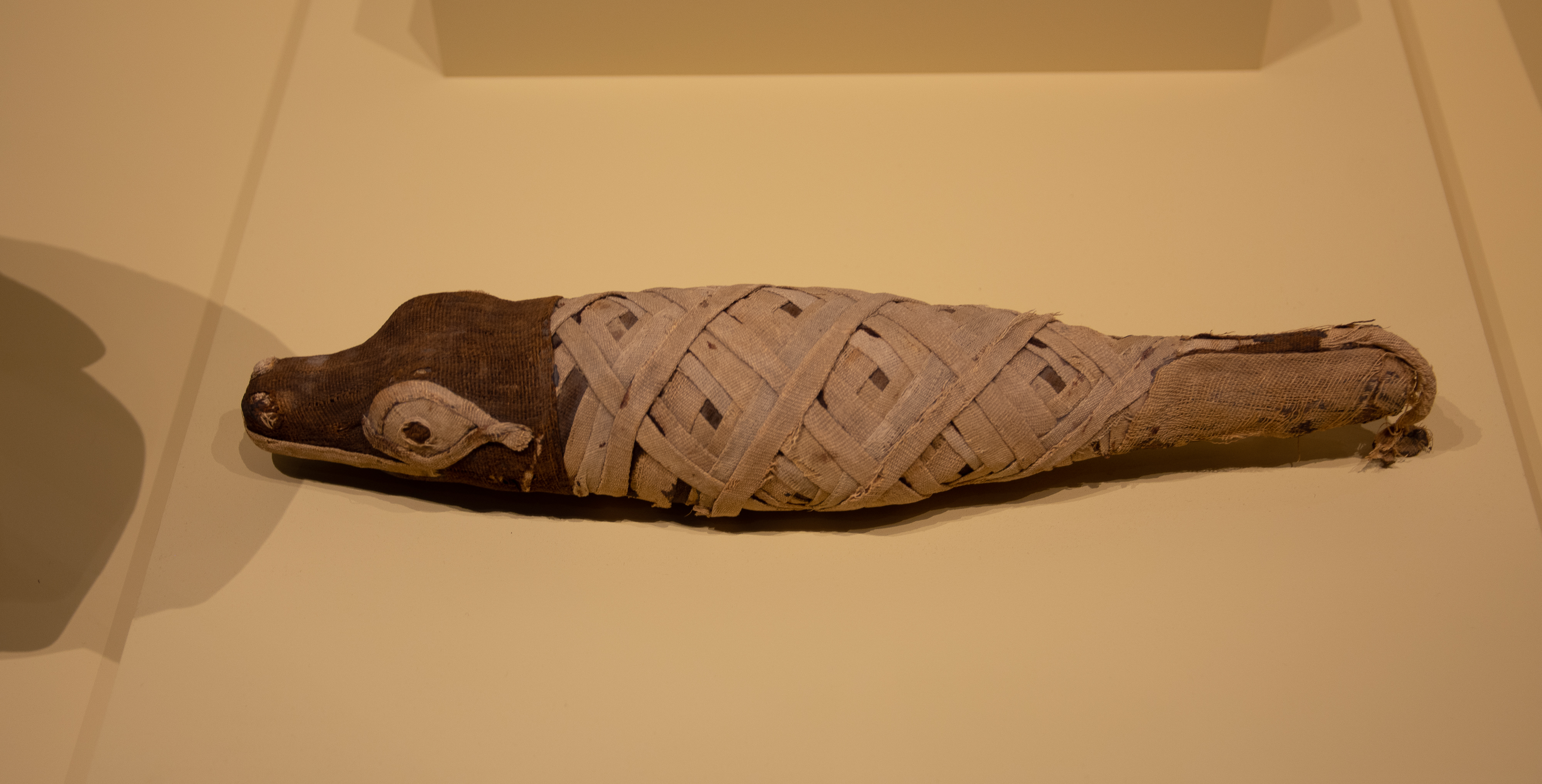
Crocodile baby mummy.

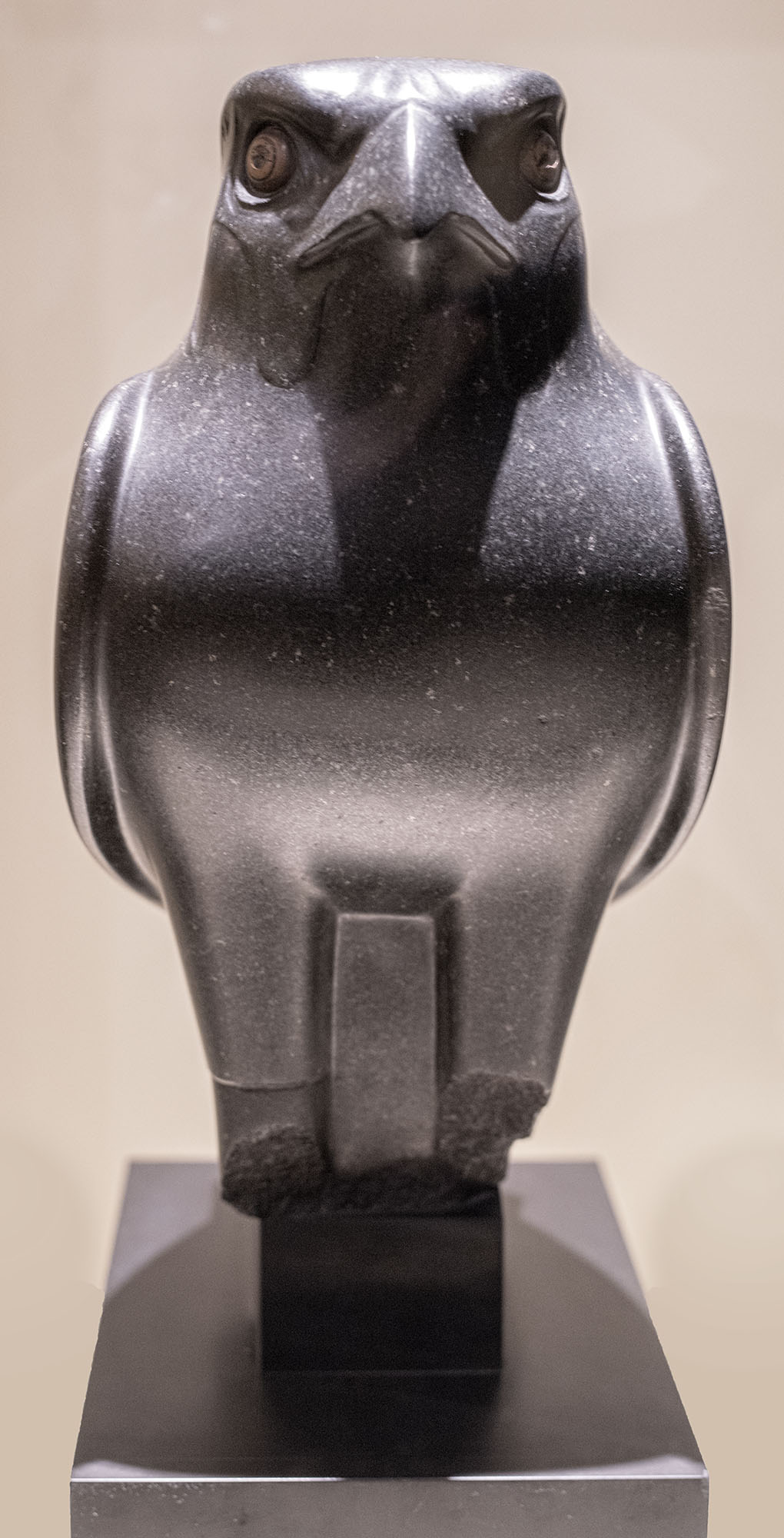
Black basalt sculpture of horus.

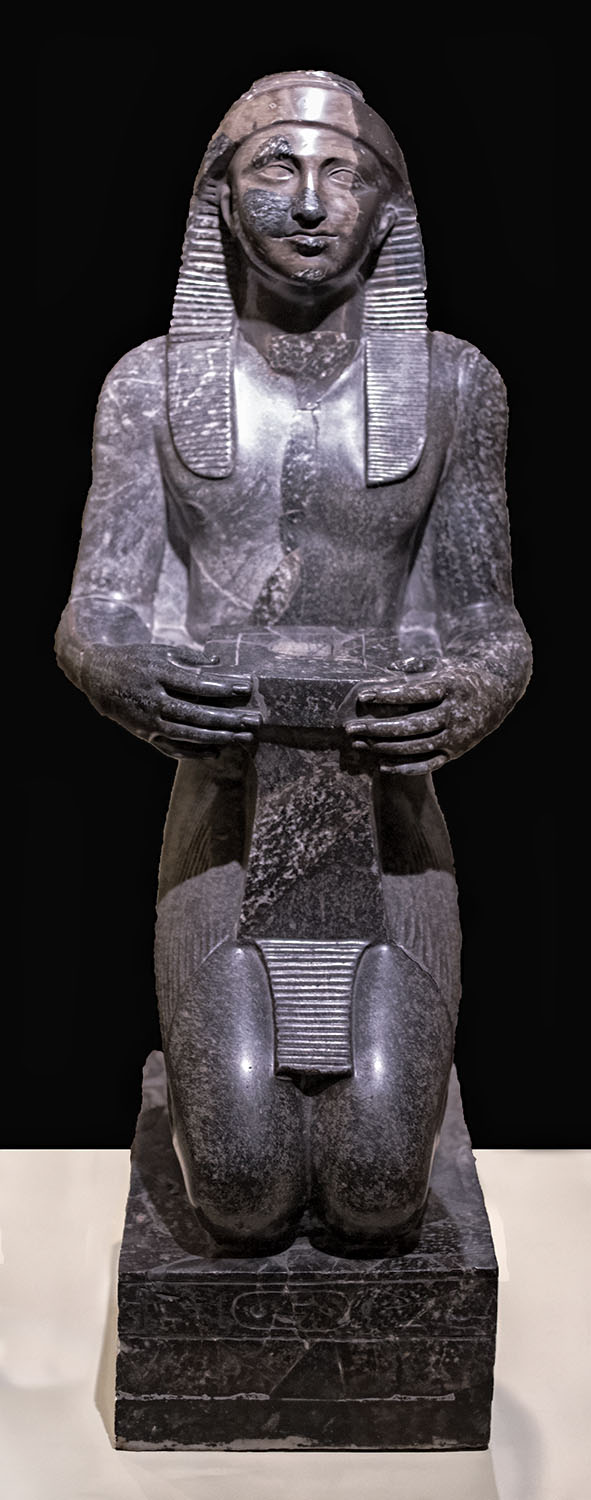
Ptolemaic period sculpture.

==== Greece ====
The Greek collection is made up of works from continental Greece, Ionia, Magna Graecia and Sicily, where the collection of bronzes, terracottas, goldsmiths, sculptures and to a greater extent pottery come from; pieces that ranging from the Mycenaean to the Hellenistic period. In its beginnings, the collection had funds from the Royal Cabinet of Natural History and the National Library, the collection was later enriched with works brought from the expeditions of the frigate Arapiles to the East in addition to the purchase of private funds such as those of the Marquis of Salamanca or those of Tomás Asensi.

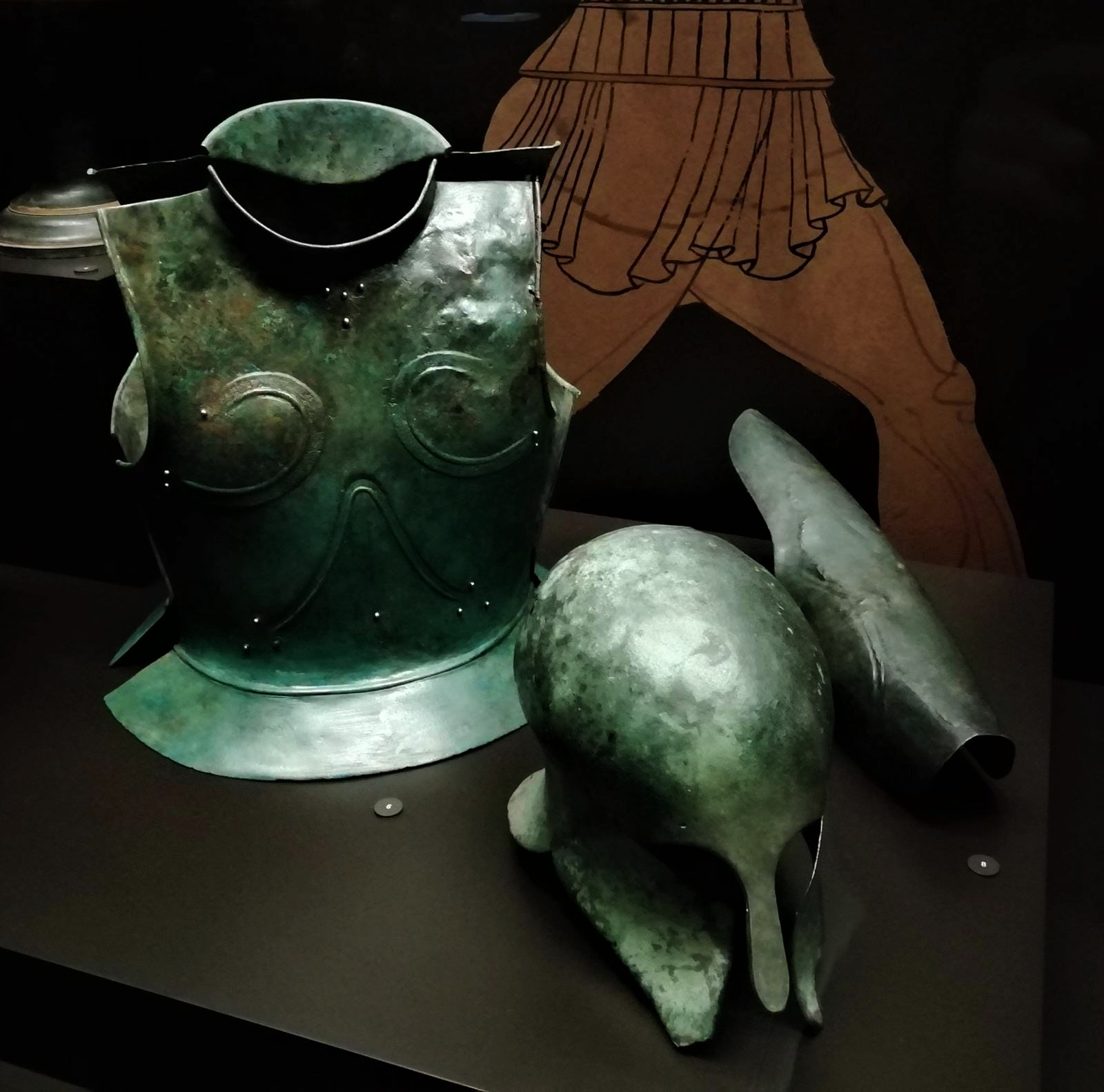
Archaic period hoplite armor set.

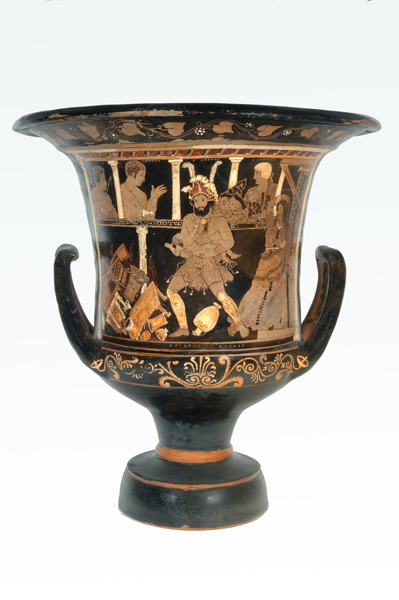
Crater of the Madness of Herakles.

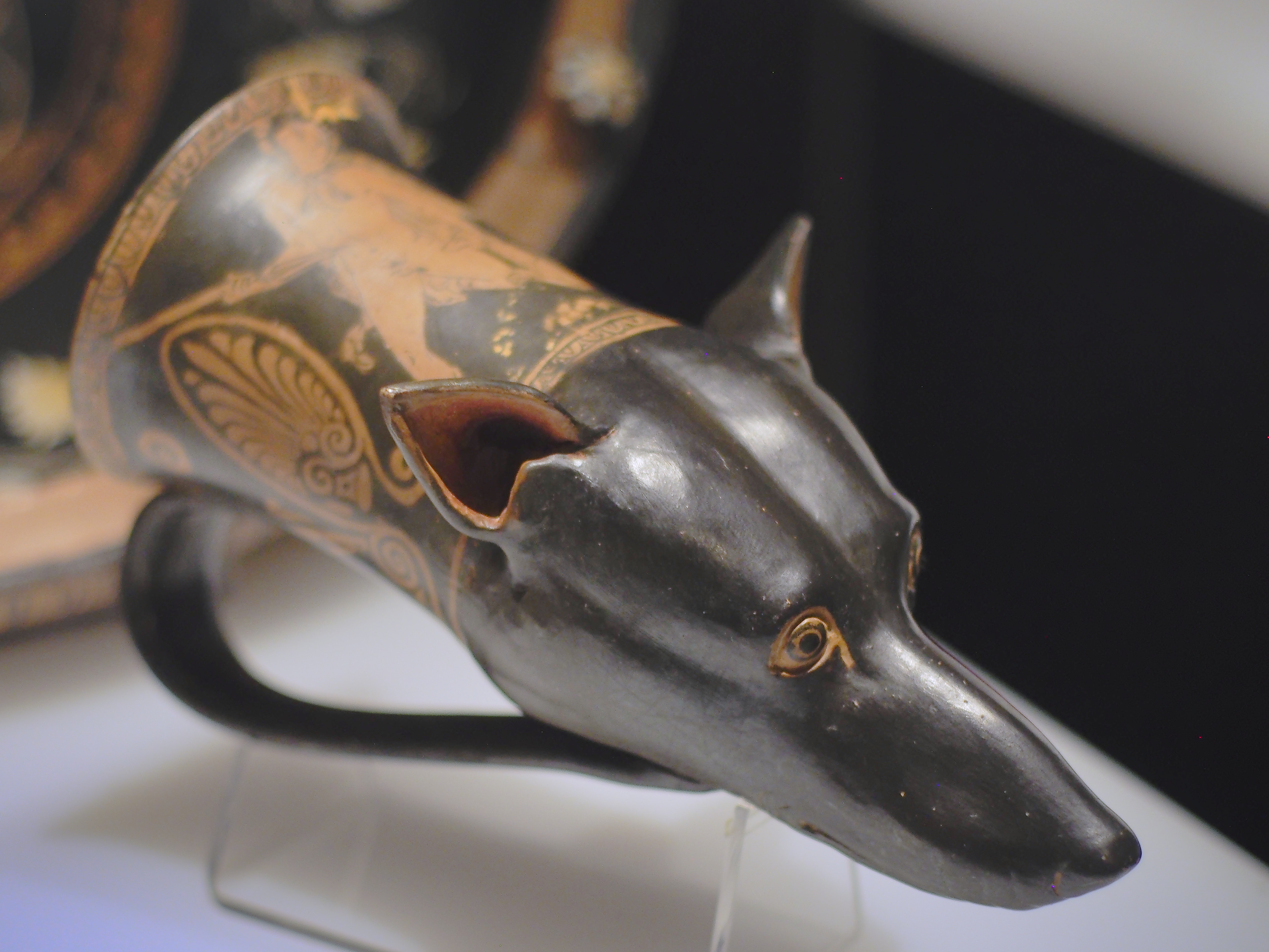
Dog-headed rhyton.

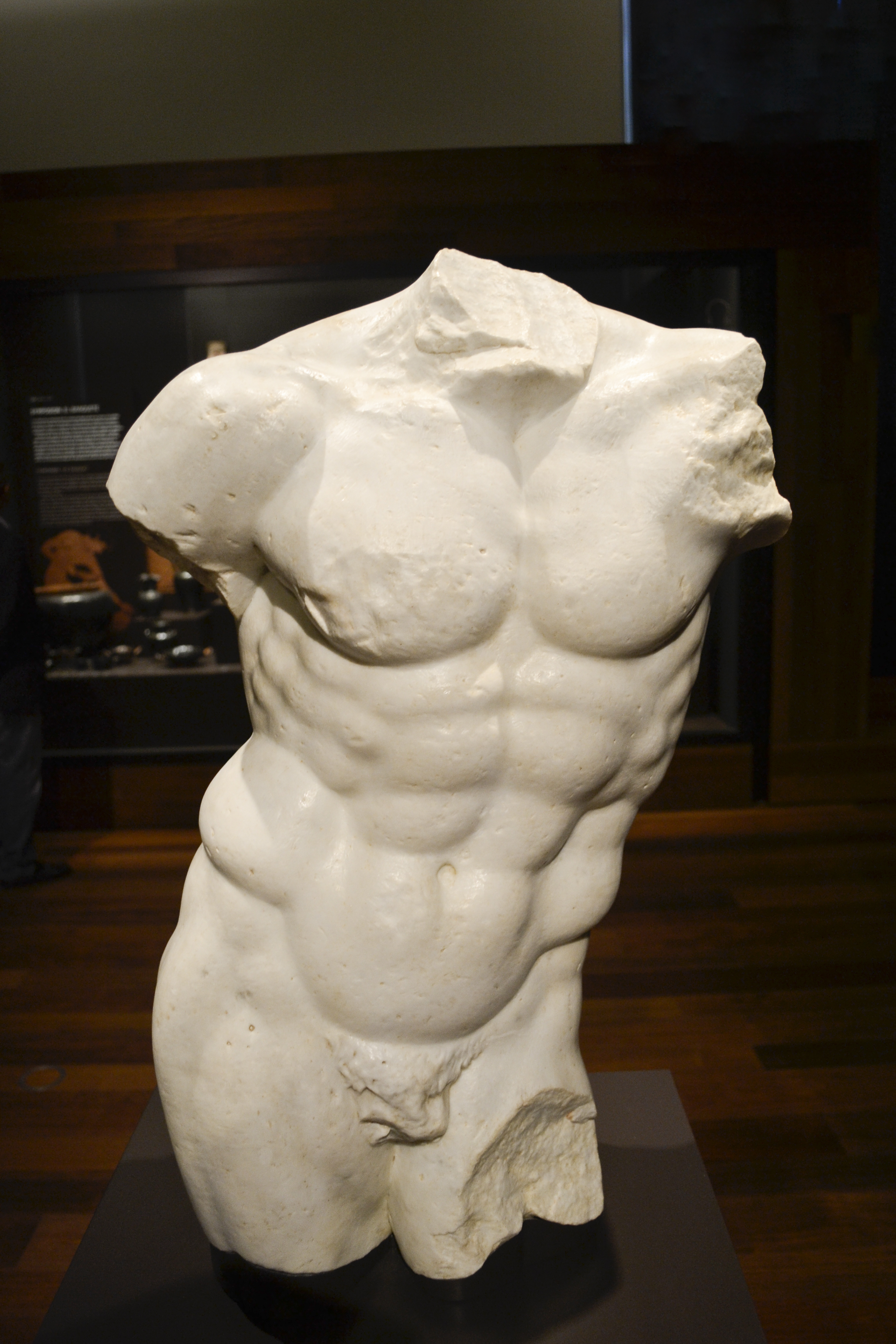
Roman copy of a Lyssippus original.

== Notable artifacts ==
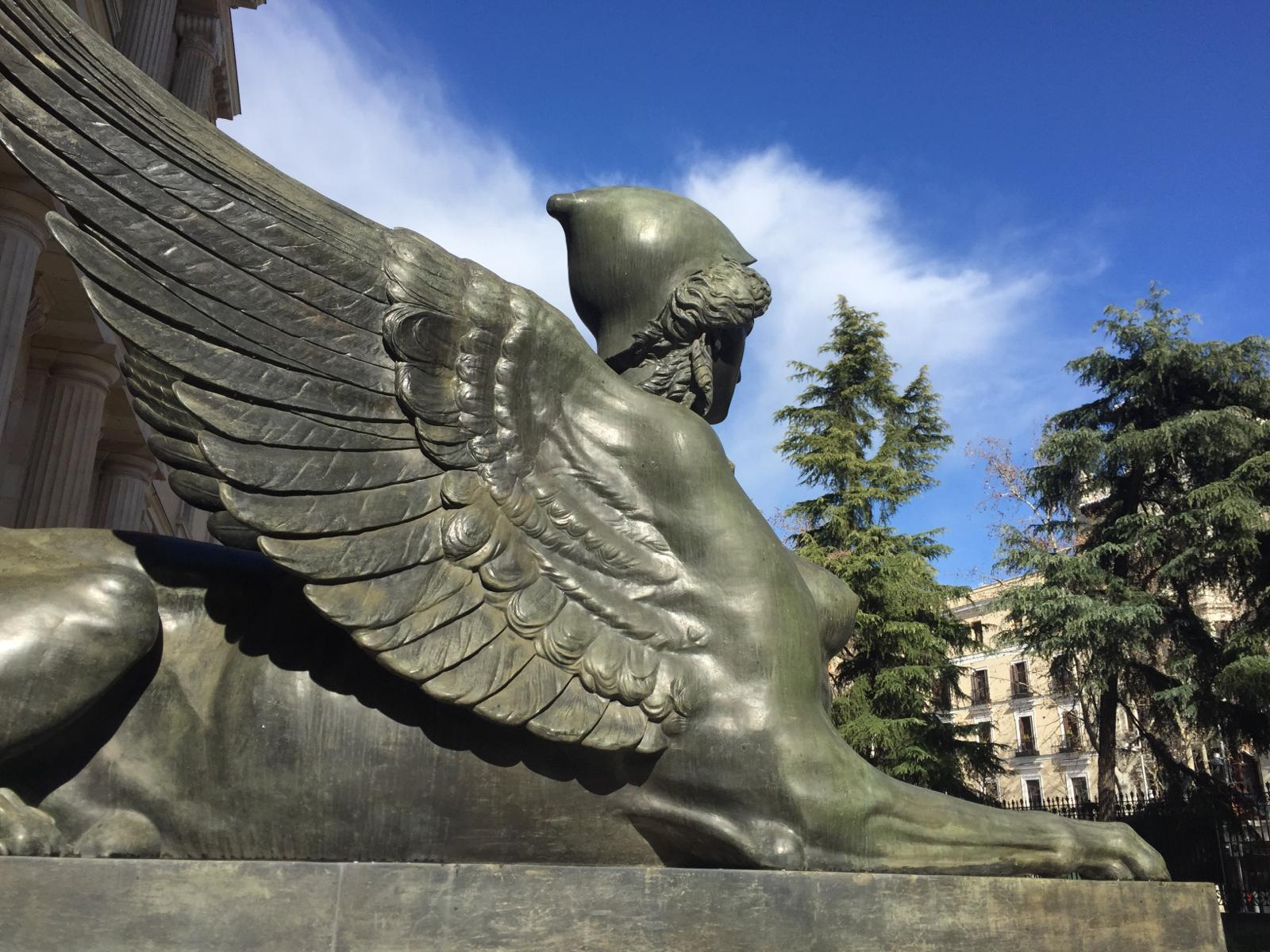
Sculpture in the entrance of the museum

Prehistoric and Iberian

- Lady of Elche
- Lady of Baza
- Lady of Galera
- Dama del Cerro de los Santos
- Biche of Balazote
- Bull of Osuna
- Magacela stele
- Mausoleum of Pozo Moro
- Sphinx of Agost

Roman

- Bear of Porcuna
- Lex Ursonensis

Medieval

- Crucifix of Ferdinand and Sancha

Al-Andalus

- Pyxis of Zamora
- One of the Alhambra vases

== Notable staff ==
- María Luz Navarro Mayor - Director of Numismatics (1978-1986)
- Carmen Alfaro Asins - Director of Numismatics (1989 - 2005?)

== See also ==
- List of museums in Spain
- National Museum of Sculpture in Valladolid
- María del Pilar Fernández Vega
