= Monte Arabí =

Mountain in Spain

Arabí
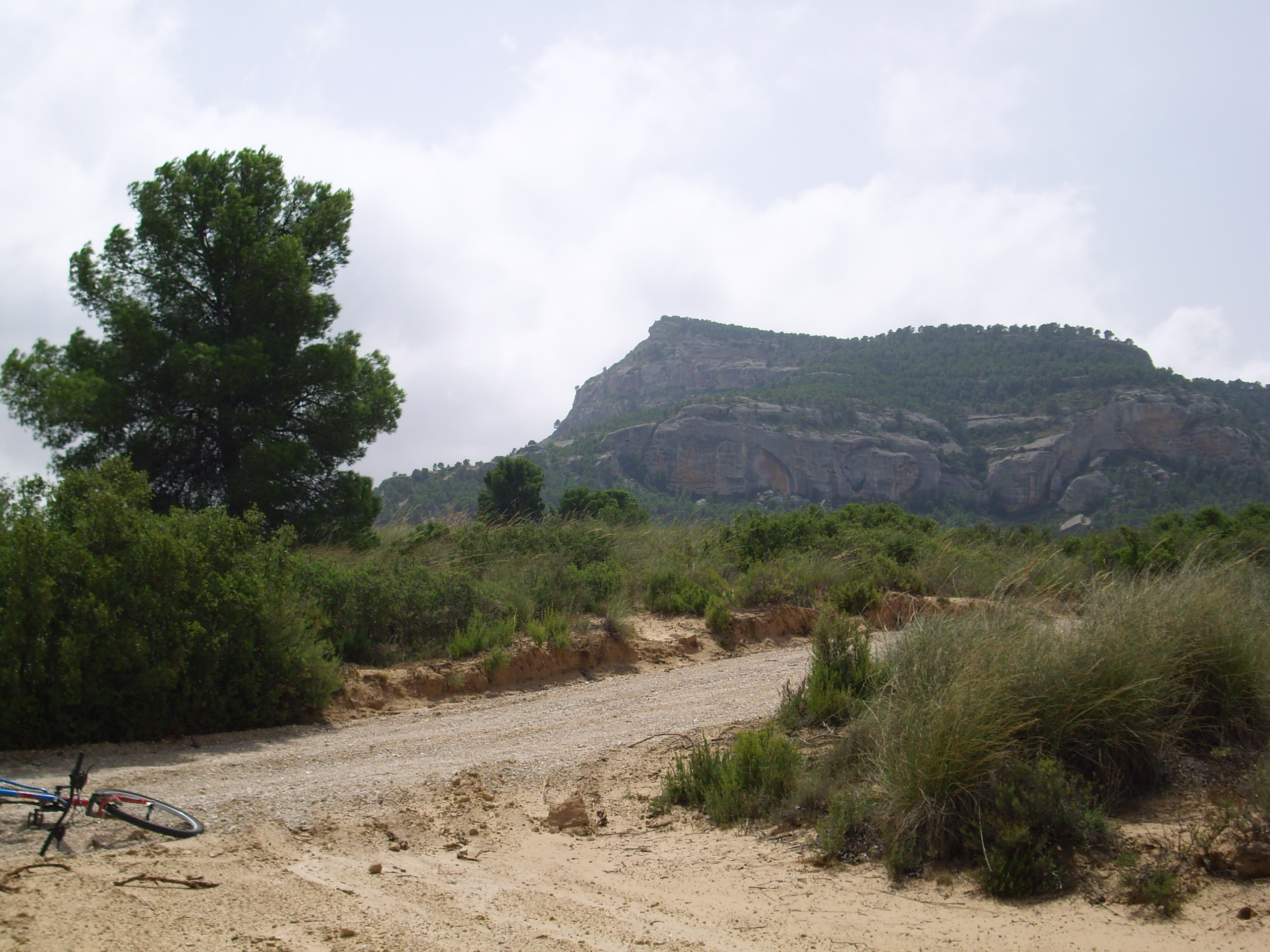
- Northern face of Arabí

Highest point
- Elevation: 1068 m a.s.l.

Geography
- Location: Northwest of the municipality of Yecla
- Country: Spain
- Parent range: Prebaetic System

Monte Arabí is a mountain located in the municipality of Yecla within the Region of Murcia, Spain. Its altitude is 1,068 m above sea level, and its area is relatively small, not enough to be considered a mountain range. Separated from Monte Arabí by a ravine to the eastern end is the hill known as Cerro de los Moros or Arabilejo.

Due to its cultural remains, rich biodiversity, and unique appearance, Monte Arabí is a prominent archaeological, biological, and geological site.

Monte Arabí was declared a Natural Monument (Decree No. 13/2016) on March 2, 2016.

== Archaeology ==
At its base, there are archaeological remains dating from the 2nd millennium BC to the Romanization period.

=== The Arabilejo Settlement ===
On the Arabilejo there are ruins of a walled settlement from the Bronze Age. It is dominated by a large rock with a natural basin, connected by various artificial channels.

=== The Petroglyphs of Monte Arabí ===
At the foot of Arabilejo lies a limestone outcrop. Over a length of 340 m and an average width of 25 m, there are more than 50 groups of petroglyphs, featuring hemispherical cupules connected with fine sinuous channels, foot-shaped carvings (podomorphs), and circles.

== Cave Paintings of Monte Arabí ==
The most valuable treasure of this natural space is the prehistoric art from the shelters of Cantos de la Visera and Abrigo del Mediodía, comprising Levantine rock art (10,000 years ago) and Iberian schematic art (6,500 years ago), declared World Heritage Site by UNESCO in 1998.

=== Cantos de Visera ===
The rock paintings of Cantos de Visera are located in two rock shelters, resulting from the collapse of nearby cliffs.

- Shelter I: Features 43 figures of naturalistic style, depicting fauna from a transitional period between the Paleolithic and Neolithic (6th/5th millennium BC), including horses, bovines, goats, and deer. The paintings are presented in red.
- Shelter II: The panel shows 80 figures, including representations of bulls, horses, deer, goats, and a wading bird (either a stork or a crane), depicted in a naturalistic style. Schematic figures such as serpentiforms, grids, broken lines, dots, and idol-shaped eye motifs are also present, all in red.

=== The Cerro de los Santos ===
About two kilometers from Monte Arabí, within the municipality of Montealegre del Castillo, is the Cerro de los Santos, an important Iberian archaeological site, home to artifacts like the Lady of Cerro de los Santos, comparable in historical significance to the Lady of Elche and Lady of Baza.
