= History of the region of Murcia =

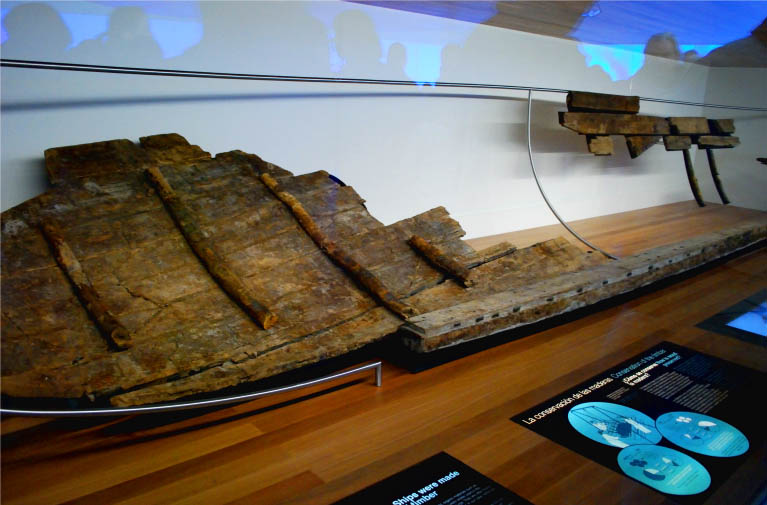
Original remains of the Mazarrón I Phoenician shipwreck. National Museum of Underwater Archaeology in Cartagena.

The history of the Region of Murcia is an integral part of the development of Spain. Due to its Mediterranean location, the area has been inhabited since ancient times, witnessing the passage of numerous cultures and civilizations. It has been shaped by conquests, cultural exchanges, and economic shifts with a pivotal role in Spain's political and military conflicts. Today, Murcia's historical legacy is evident in its archaeological sites, medieval fortresses, and cultural traditions.

Written history starts with the significant interaction of the native Iberian culture with Greek and Phoenician traders. The interaction with the Mediterranean took a more permanent form when the region became the center, of the short lived Carthaginian empire in the Iberian Peninsula, particularly its capital the modern day Cartagena, losing the empire to Rome in the Second Punic War in 209 BC. During Roman rule the region became prosperous but this came to the end with the Barbarian invasions.

Rome called for help from the Visigoths who incorporated it into their Kingdom which would later become independent of Rome, but after the Islamic invasion of Spain the semi-autonomous region known as the Kūra of Tudmir emerged, following Treaty of Orihuela. Over time, Muslim rule strengthened, particularly after the foundation of the city of Murcia, which alternated between being part of bigger Muslim states or the capital of an independent taifa kingdom. The Moors introduced advanced irrigation systems as well as a silk industry.

The Christian reconquista, occurring between 1243 and 1266, along with the influence of both the Crown of Castile and the Crown of Aragon, and the establishment of the border Kingdom of Murcia, shaped the distinct Murcian culture that persisted for seven centuries. This historic entity, a precursor to the modern Region of Murcia, experienced periods of crisis, such as in the 14th century, as well as periods of prosperity, particularly in the 16th century and the 18th century.

After the dissolution of the medieval kingdoms, from 1833 to 1978, the Murcian Region existed as a two-province entity (comprising the provinces of Murcia and Albacete). In 1873 the short lived Cantón Murciano was proclaimed, starting the Cantonal rebellion. During the transition from Franco's rule, this arrangement led to the establishment of the present-day autonomous community of the Region of Murcia, following the transfer of the Province of Albacete to Castilla-La Mancha.

== Prehistory ==
Since the Lower Paleolithic era, the Region of Murcia has been inhabited by humans. In the Torre-Pacheco municipality in the southeast of the region is a noteworthy paleontological site, the Sima de las Palomas, which contains bone remains of Neanderthals from the Middle Paleolithic era, some of the oldest human remains on the Iberian Peninsula. A number of cave paintings have been found in the region including Monte Arabí and Cueva del Arco.

The Argaric culture one of the most developed cultures of the Metal Ages, flourished in the region from the Chalcolithic era until the early Bronze Age, with the site of La Bastida in the southwest of the region being a prominent example.

=== The Iberians in Murcia ===
The Bastetani and Contestani Iberian people were present in the area during the Middle and Late Bronze Age and remained until very early in ancient history, before the Romans conquered a large part of the Iberian Peninsula. A shrine, necropolis, and an ancient settlement for these people can be found at the El Cigarralejo site. Another site that consists of the remains of an Iberian shrine is Santuario Ibérico de la Luz, located in the Murcia municipality.

The transition from the Late Bronze Age to the Iron Age coincided with Phoenician and later Greek merchants arriving and introducing new customs, beliefs and material objects.

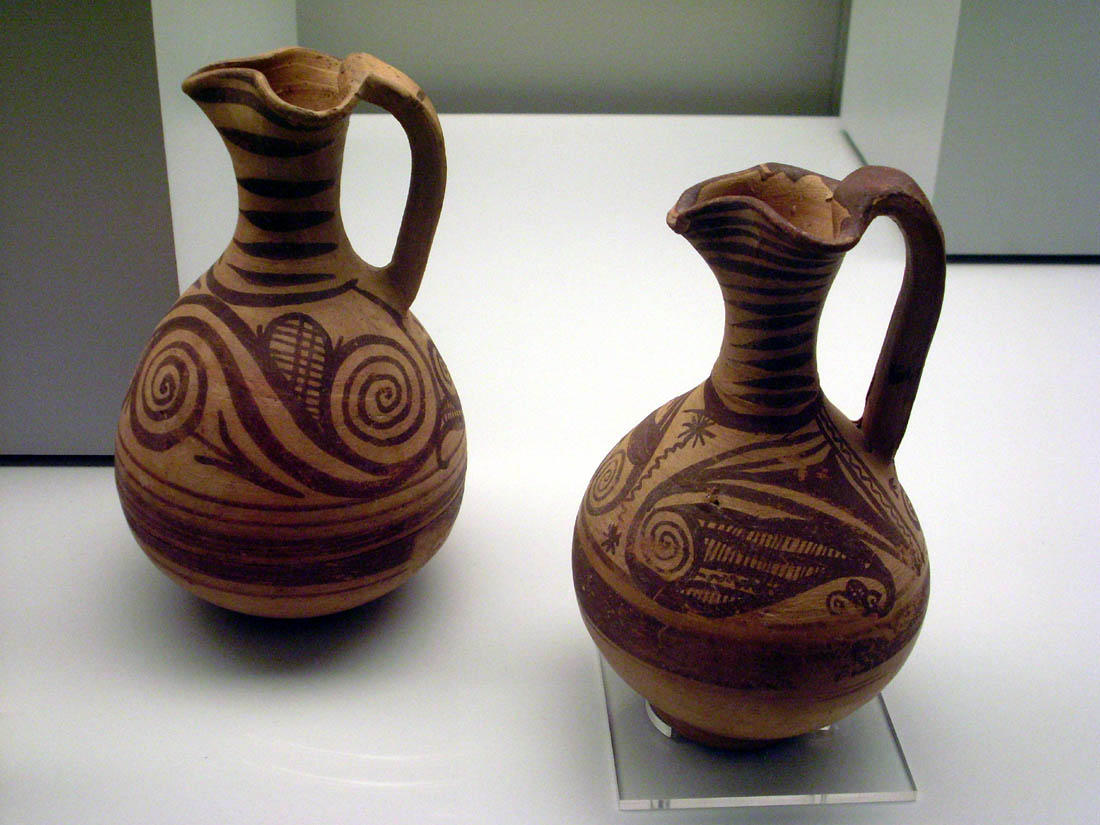
Oinochoes from Verdolay. Museum of Archaeology of Murcia.

This led to the cultural renaissance represented by the Iberians, the predominant civilization of the Iron Age in the Region of Murcia, dominated by the Bastetani in the west, the Mastieni in the south, and the Contestani in the east of present-day Murcia.

Experts such as Jorge Juan Eiroa place the full emergence of iron in the Murcia area in the 7th century BC, particularly in coastal settlements with strong Phoenician influence. The Mazarrón area stands out, home to sites such as Punta de los Gavilanes and the Phoenician shipwrecks of Mazarrón.

Within the native Iberian context, the most extensively studied sites in the Region of Murcia include Los Molinicos (Moratalla), Cabezo del Tío Pío (Archena), El Cigarralejo (Mula), Coimbra del Barranco Ancho Iberian Complex (Jumilla), and Verdolay (Murcia). By 1989, 146 Iberian sites had been documented in the region, with approximately 30 more identified since then.

== Ancient Era ==
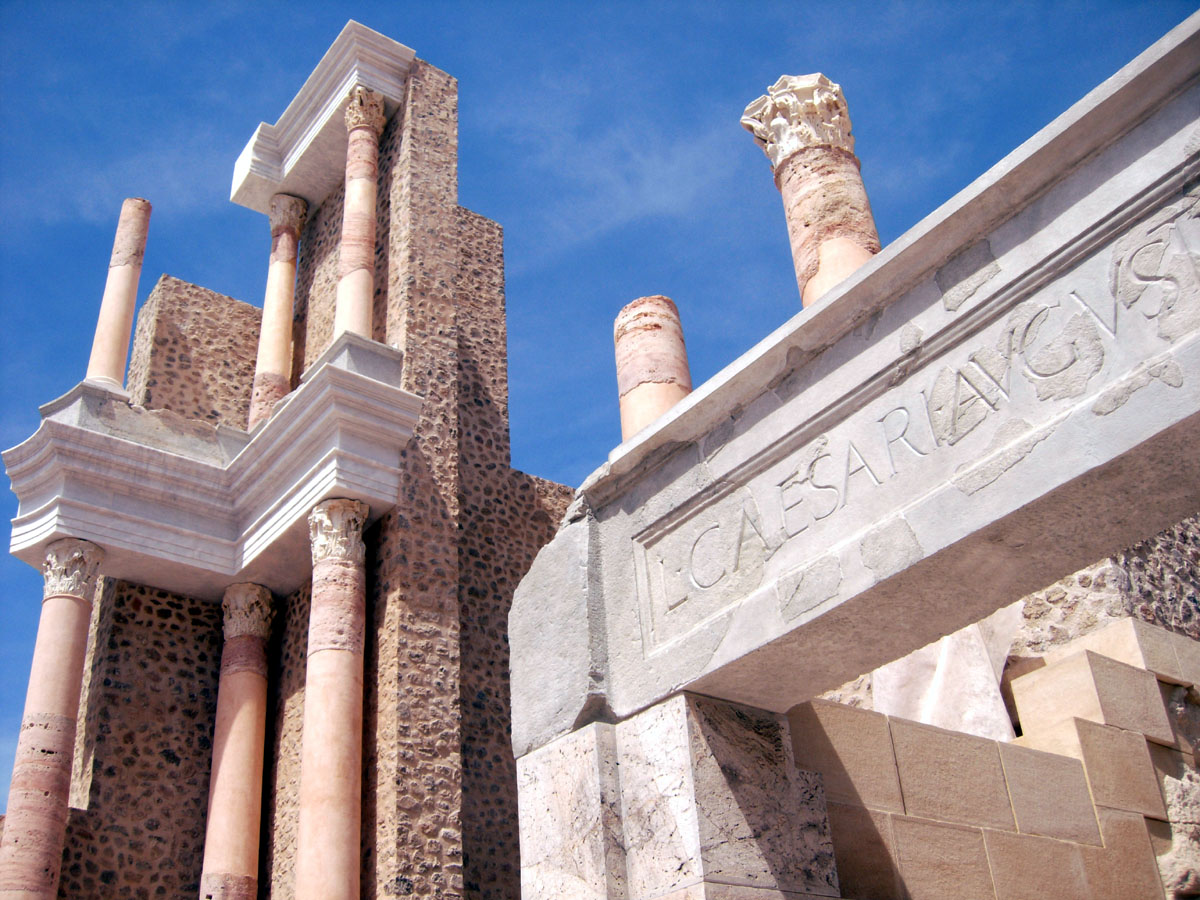
Roman Theatre, Cartagena

In 228 BC, the Carthaginian general Hasdrubal refounded what is now Cartagena for the purpose of serving as a stepping-off point for the conquest of Spain. As it had one of the best harbors in the Western Mediterranean it became a permanent trading port on its coast and was named Qart-Hadast ("New City"), a name identical to Carthage, and became the centre of their seacoast empire.

In 209 BC, Qart-Hadast was conquered by the Romans during the Punic Wars and the territory now belonged to the province of Hispania Carthaginensis. During the Roman era, Carthago Nova was the most important place in the region, eventually becoming the capital of a province during the Late Roman Empire. There are still remains of ancient villas in the Campo de Cartagena. During Roman rule the region became prosperous due to its position as a gateway between the Mediterranean and the Iberian peninsula as well as mining. The Romans built a fish salting factory and settled in a little town called Ficaria, in the current municipality of Mazarrón. Altiplano and Noroeste comarcas (a kind of region) both contain surviving dwellings of the Romans.

== Barbarian Rule ==
In the early 5th century, the Vandals acquired the Roman province of Carthaginensis, which contains Murcia after they invaded the Iberian Peninsula with the Suebi and Alans. The Romans wanted to recover their land and requested assistance from the Visigoths, to which they would provide goods and territory in return. With that, the Vandals were defeated by the Visigoths and fled to North Africa. Consequently, the Visigoths became federated to the Roman Empire in a kingdom that stretched from Gibraltar to the Loire River. The Visigothic kingdom became independent of the Roman Empire in 476.

In 555 AD the Byzantine emperor Justinian conquered the southeastern coast of the Iberian Peninsula and established the Byzantine province of Spania encompassing part of the current Region of Murcia including the strategically vital port of Cartagena together with its hinterland, Mar Menor and Alto Guadalentín. It returned to Visigothic control in the 8th century.

== Moorish Middle Ages ==
In the early 8th century there was a disputed succession to the Visigothic throne. The king Wittiza wanted his son Agila to be his successor, but the nobles of the court elected Roderic, duke of Baetica, as king. The people in favour of Agila conspired to overthrow Roderic. They asked the Moors for help and promised spoils of war in return.

The Moors began conquering the Iberian Peninsula in 711. Roderic was killed, and the Visigothic kingdom disappeared. Consequently, the Moors quickly conquered much of the peninsula.

Theodemir led a nucleus of resistance in almost all the current region and the south of Alicante province. In 713, he signed the Treaty of Orihuela with the Moorish leader Abd al-Aziz ibn Musa as the resistance could no longer endure. The territory came under Muslim rule, but the conquerors granted it political autonomy. This marked a unique integration of the southeastern region into Al-Andalus.

Under the Moors, who introduced the large-scale irrigation upon which Murcian agriculture relies, the province was known as Todmir. According to Idrisi, the 12th century Arab cartographer based in Sicily, it included the cities of Orihuela, Lorca, Mula, and Chinchilla.

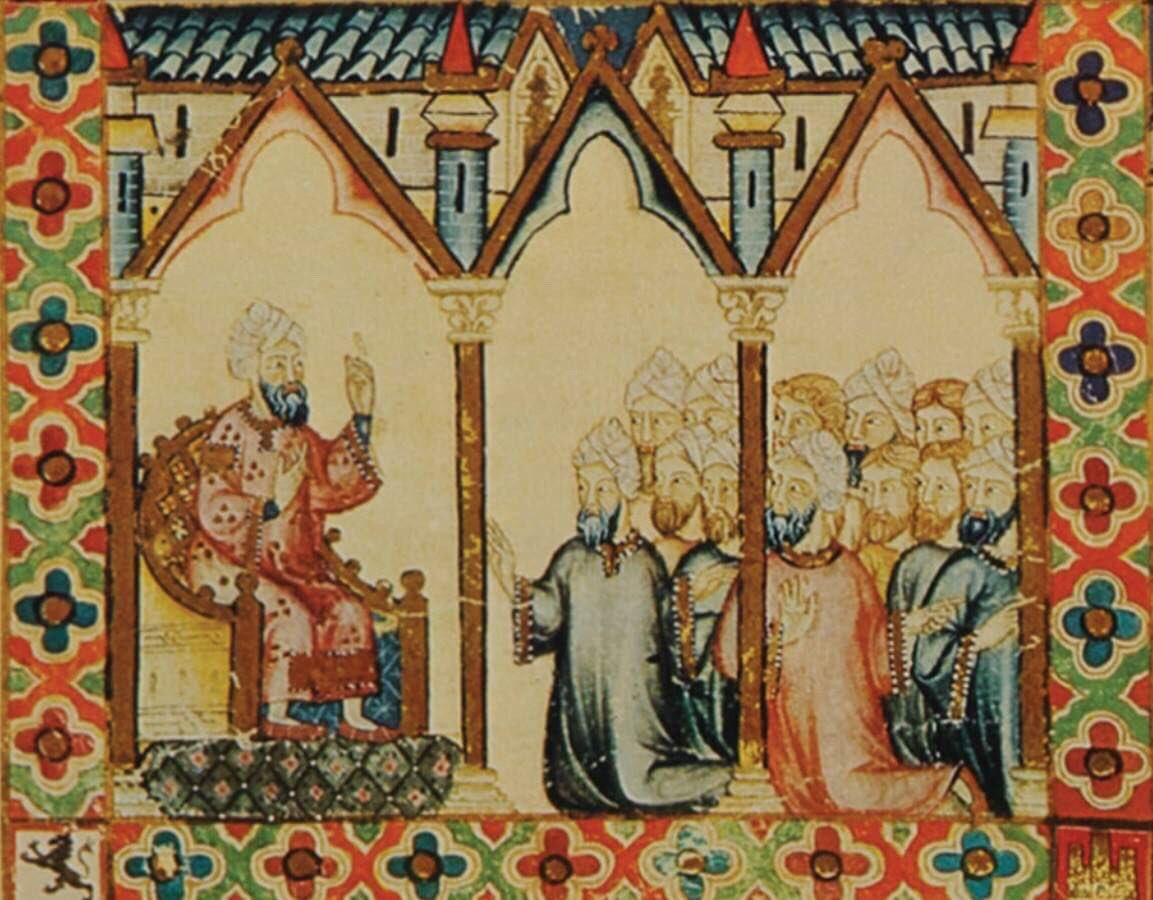
Ibn Hud as depicted in the Cantigas de Santa Maria

In the early 11th century, after the fall of the Umayyad Caliphate of Córdoba, a territory centered on the city of Murcia became an independent principality, or taifa. At one point, the taifa included parts of the present-day provinces of Albacete and Almería, as well.

After the 1086 Battle of Sagrajas, the Almoravid emirate swallowed up the taifas. When Almoravid rule ultimately declined, Abu ʿAbd Allāh Muḥammad ibn Saʿd ibn Mardanīš established a taifa—including the cities of Murcia, Valencia, and Dénia—that opposed for a time the spread of the Almohads, but ultimately succumbed to the latter's advance in the 1170s. Conversely, when the Almohads receded after their defeat in the 1212 Battle of Las Navas de Tolosa, another taifa-prince based in Murcia, Ibn Hud, rebelled against Almohad rule and briefly controlled most of Al-Andalus.

== Christian Middle Ages ==
Ferdinand III of Castile received the submission of the Moorish king of Murcia under the terms of the 1243 Treaty of Alcaraz and made the territory a protectorate of the Crown of Castile. There were towns that rejected compliance with the treaty, such as Qartayanna-Al halfa (Cartagena), Lurqa (Lorca) and Mula. There were also towns where governors accepted the treaty but the inhabitants did not, such as Aledo, Ricote, Uruyla (Orihuela), and Medina La-Quant (Alicante), (although the two last do not belong to the present-day Region of Murcia; they were part of the Taifa of Murcia). In 1245, a Castilian army and a fleet from the Cantabrian Sea conquered Qartayanna. Consequently, the rest of the rebellious towns were also taken by the Castilians. Following the support of local Muslims for the Mudéjar revolt of 1264–1266, in 1266 Alfonso X of Castile annexed the territory outright with critical military support from his uncle Jaime I of Aragon.

The Castilian conquest of Murcia marked the end of the Aragon's southward expansion along the Iberian Mediterranean coast. The kingdom of Murcia was repopulated with people from Christian territories by giving them land.

James II of Aragon broke an agreement between the Castile and Aragon regarding the division of territory between the two kingdoms and, from 1296 to 1302, conquered Alicante, Elche, Orihuela, Murcia, Cartagena, and Lorca. In consequence of those victories, James II and Ferdinand IV of Castile agreed to the Treaty of Torrellas, which stipulated the return of the conquered territory to Castile, save for the towns of Cartagena, Orihuela, Elche, and Alicante. In 1305, Cartagena was returned to Castile. The kingdom of Murcia lost the territory of the current province of Alicante.

The Castilian monarchs proceeded to delegate power over the whole Kingdom of Murcia (then a borderland of the Crown of Castile, near Granada and Aragon) to a senior officer called the Adelantado. The kingdom of Murcia was divided into religious manors, nobility manors, and señoríos de realengo (a type of manorialism in which the noble had the property, but the king had the authority to administer justice). There were two noble lineages during the Late Middle Ages and the modern period: Los Manueles and Los Fajardos.

The Kingdom of Murcia was adjacent to the Emirate of Granada, which provoked several Muslim raids and wars that occurred mainly during the 15th century.

== Early Modern period ==
Map of the Kingdom of Murcia in 1590

After the fall of Granada the Kingdom of Murcia's population increased in the early 16th century t Although there were three plague epidemics during the century, they did not severely affect the region.

Murcia was caught up in the Castile centered Revolt of the Comuneros in 1520 and 1521, as well as Murcia the cities of Cartagena, Lorca, Caravaca, Cehegín and Totana supported the revolt at the castle in Aledo holding out for the monarchy. Murcia's rebellion there had a character closer to the nearby Revolt of the Brotherhoods in Valencia in Aragon and it did not coordinate much with the junta coordinating the rebellion. In 1521, the Revolt of the Comuneros was defeated.

In the early 17th century, King Philip III of Spain expelled all the Moriscos (descendants of Muslims) from Valencia, Aragon, and Castille. During this century, two plague epidemics also occurred.

Murcia was fought over during the War of the Spanish Succession until the Battle of the Huerto de las Bombas, fought near Murcia on 4 September 1706. The battle ended in victory for the Bourbon's viceroy of Murcia, bishop Luis de Belluga, the against a combined British and Dutch force.

During the 18th century, Francisco Salzillo was a notable Baroque artist in the Kingdom of Murcia. He made carvings with religious imagery.

== Napoleonic wars ==
In 1807, Napoleon signed the Treaty of Fontainebleau with Spain, for French armies to cross the peninsula to conquer Portugal. In early 1808, Napoleon betrayed Spain and invaded Pamplona, San Sebastián, Barcelona, Burgos, and Salamanca. In 1808, the people of Madrid rebelled, and all of Spain was summoned to fight the French invaders. The people of the country established for each province political organisations, or juntas, as alternatives to the official administrations. Since the French were not much present in the Kingdom of Murcia, battles were rare in the region. Nevertheless, Spaniards from the region battled the French in other areas of Spain. In addition, the region became a staging area for the movement of troops, guns, and supplies destined for the eastern Iberian Peninsula, or Andalucía. In 1810, French troops did attack the Kingdom of Murcia. Most local officials escaped. The French, coming from Lorca, invaded the town of Murcia on 23 April, and looted it on the 26th. The troops returned to the town in August, but defensive measures had been taken and the French attack was repelled. The French army occupied Murcia again in January 1812, looting Águilas, Lorca, Caravaca, Cehegín, Jumilla, Yecla, Mula, Alhama de Murcia, and the Ricote Valley. Cartagena withstood a French siege, owing to its rampart and the help of an English fleet. In 1813, the French were decisively defeated in the north at the Battle of Vitoria.

== Nineteenth Century ==
After the provincial administrative reform of 1833, the first Region of Murcia was formed from the provinces of Albacete and Murcia. In the first attempt at decentralization, during the First Republic, this region was one of the 17 member states that were contemplated by the Spanish Draft Constitution of 1873, proclaiming during that year the so-called Cantón Murciano, as an attempt to form a regional canton in the context of the Cantonal rebellion.

== 20th century ==
In 1936, under the Second Spanish Republic, there was an uprising. The North African territories of Spain were taken on 17 July. The uprising was successful in some areas of Spain. The partial success of the uprising brought on the Spanish Civil War. The province of Murcia supported the Popular Front (the governing party in that era). The port of Cartagena became the main base of the Republican navy and was home to destroyer, cruiser, and submarine fleets. Thus, the Region of Murcia was of geostrategic importance during the war. To defend Cartagena, there were anti-aircraft bases throughout the region. The region was not near the frontlines and overall it was not attacked, except from the air against Cartagena and Águilas. Large factories, basic services, and some other properties were seized by trade unions. There was an impoverishment among the inhabitants and a lack of food supplies. Consequently, rationing was established in the region.

Under Francoist Spain, wine agriculture and economic activities increased in the Altiplano comarca (north of the region). An oil refinery infrastructure was established in Cartagena in 1942, and power refineries, supply refineries, and factories were constructed in the same area during the 1950s and 1960s.

In 1978, the Regional Council of Murcia was created as a pre-autonomous body, in effect until 1982, when the Statute of Autonomy of the Region of Murcia was approved. The Province of Albacete was transferred to Castilla-La Mancha. The province of Murcia was then granted autonomy under the official name of the Autonomous Community of the Region of Murcia in the framework of the political process in place during the Spanish transition to democracy.

Massive riots erupted in Cartagena in 1992 protesting against the closing down of shipbuilding, mining and chemical companies and the regional legislature building was set on fire.

== Sources ==
- Pérez, Joseph (2001). Los Comuneros (in Spanish). Madrid: La Esfera de los Libros, S.L. ISBN 84-9734-003-5.
