= Adherbal (governor) =

Carthaginian noble and governor of Gadir

Adherbal (Punic: 𐤀𐤃𐤓𐤁𐤏𐤋, ʾDRBʿL) was a Carthaginian noble who served as the governor of Gadir (Cadiz) during the Second Punic War. He was also a Carthaginian military commander in this war under the command of Mago Barca. He was one of the lesser generals of the Punic War and was often trying to prove his worth. He is perhaps best known for his defeat in the naval Battle of Carteia in 206 BC while attempting to leave Carthaginian Spain with valuable prisoners. His fleet was defeated near the ancient city of Carteia by G. Laelius.

== See also ==
- Other Adherbals in Carthaginian history
- Baal, the Canaanite deity
