= Cerro de los Santos =

Coordinates: 38°44′0.05″N 1°16′9.82″W

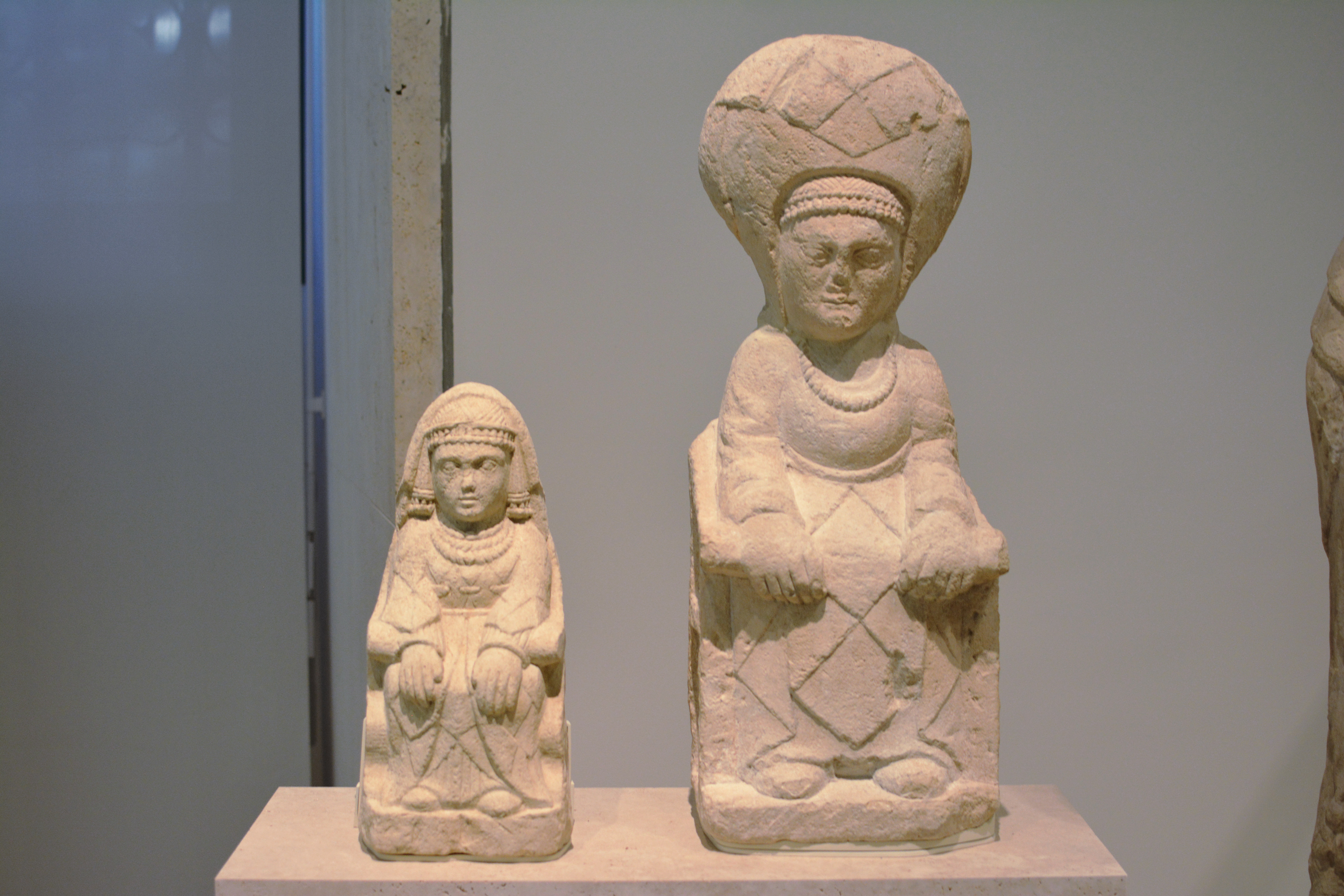
Statues of seated figures, possibly goddesses or high-ranking women, from Cerro de Los Santos

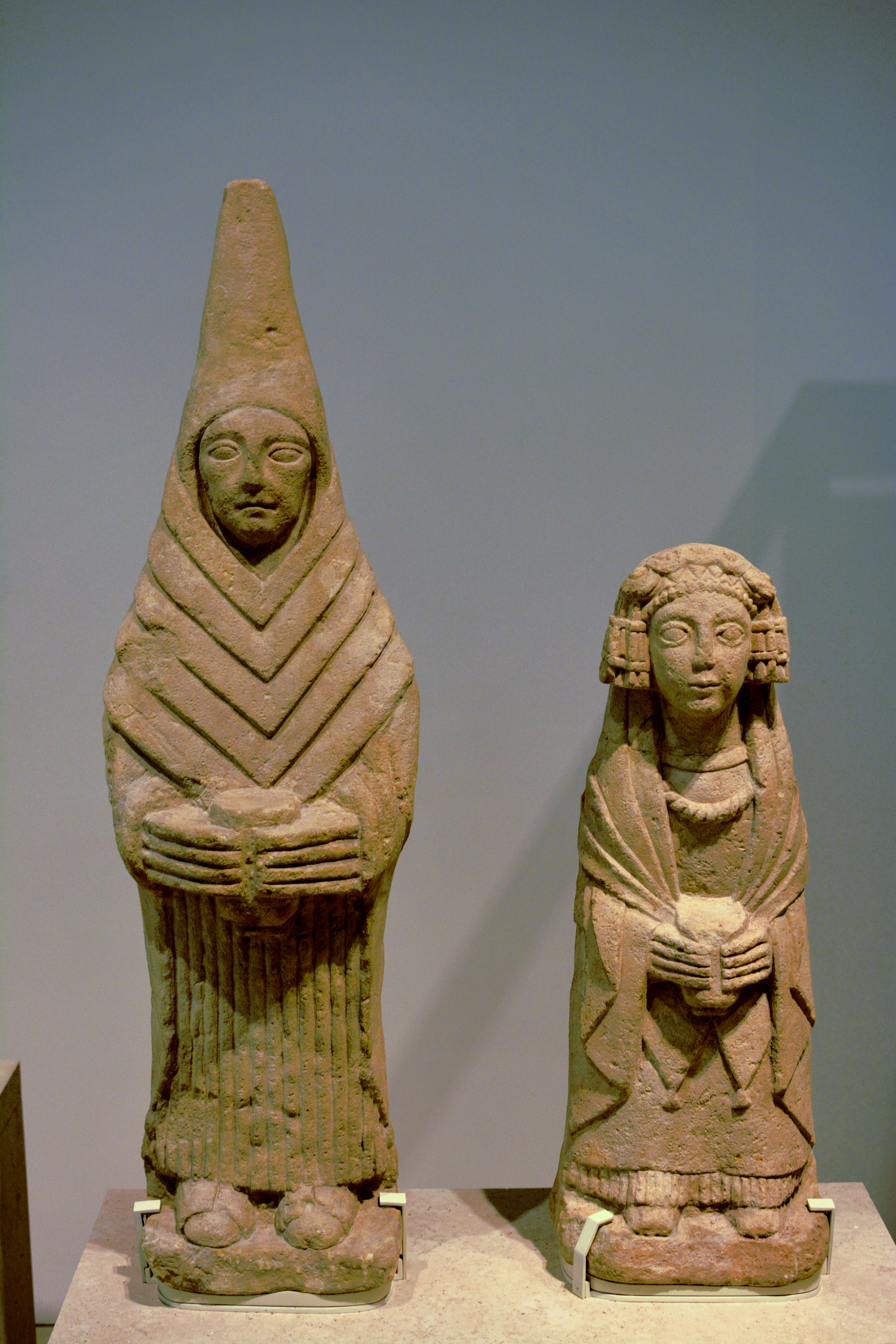
Statues of women bearing offerings

Cerro de los Santos is an Iberian religious sanctuary built in the 4th century BCE, during the Iberian period, with evidence of continued use into the Roman period. The site lies in southeastern Spain near an ancient road. Little remains of the original structures at the site. Nineteenth century excavations documented some features of a temple but only an outline now remains. The site is known for its many votive sculptures, numbering about 300. Most of the sculptures depict women including the most notable find, the Dama del Cerro de los Santos. In addition to the women, statues of men, possibly dating from a later period, and a few statues of animals have also been found.

== Location ==
The site is located outside of the municipality of Montealegre del Castillo in the province of Albacete, Spain. The site, marked by a commemorative obelisk erected in 1929, is near the highway to Yecla. The site would have been along the Via Heraclea, in the territory of the Bastetani near the Contestani. The site is a few kilometres from another Iberian site, Llano de la Consolación. Few visible remains survive. The outline of the temple, visible in the eighteenth century, has disappeared completely.

== Temple ==
The temple was 15.6 by 9.9 m (51 by 32 ft) and had a 2.6 m (8 ft 6 in) wide doorway with access by two flights of steps. Based on the 19th century excavations, the walls were formed by a double course of square blocks secured by lead clamps. The roof was tiled and the floor may have been paved with rhomboidal terracotta tiles. The site does not have the usual characteristics of an Iberian sanctuary.

== Sculptures ==
Excavations uncovered about 300 stone sculptures. Most of the sculptures are votives of human figures, although a few animal sculptures have been found. Sculptures of women dominate. The sculptures are individual pieces with only one example of a group sculpture being found. The sculptures accumulated over time with the earliest being dated to the 4th century BCE while later examples have Latin letter inscriptions or appear more Roman in style. A lack of artifacts from the Imperial Roman period suggests that the site stopped being used. The sculptures are generally similar in hair and dress, but the eyes differ in size and position. Jaeggi believes this may be an attempt to differentiate otherwise similar statues to better represent unique donors. According to Jaeggi, the votive statues represent their donors who receive protection from a deity when their avatars are permanently placed in the sanctuary.The sculptures are now primarily housed at the National Archaeological Museum of Spain in Madrid.

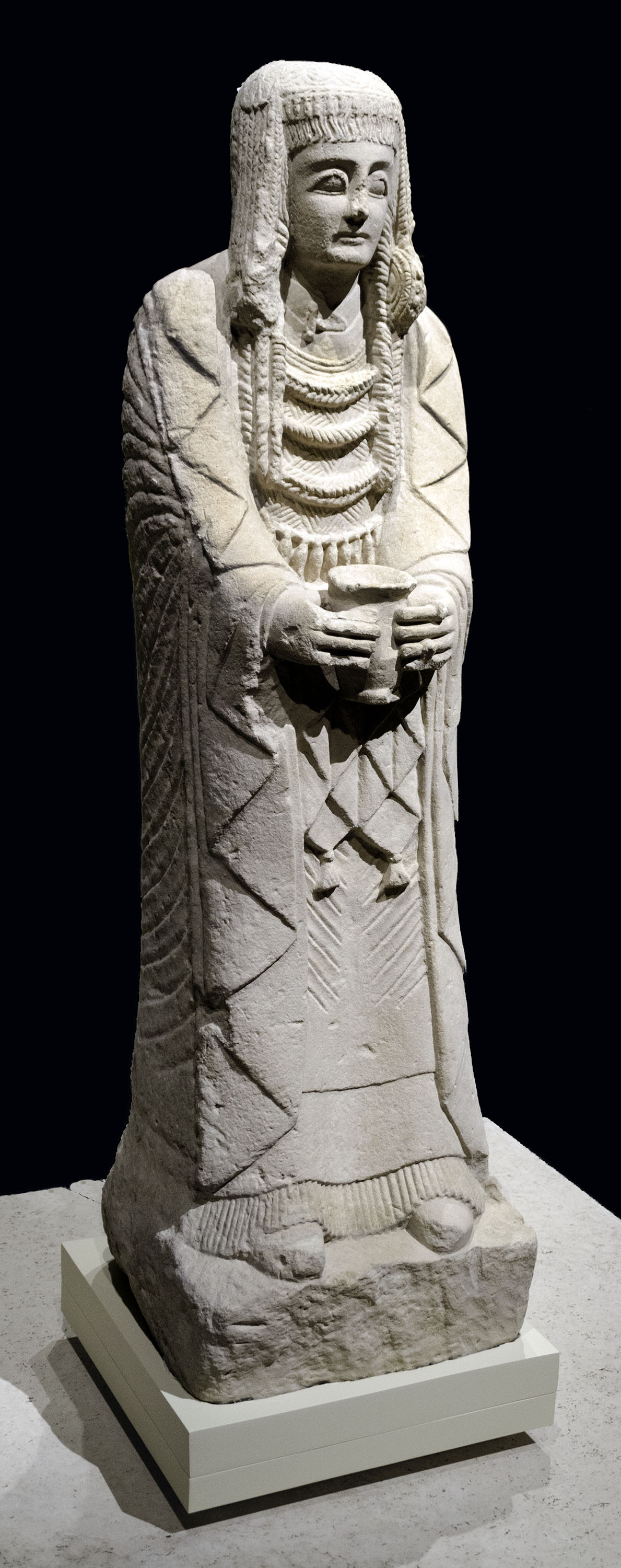
Dama of Cerro de los Santos

The female statues have cloaks or tiara-like headdresses. Most of these figures are standing, but some depict the figure seated on a chair or throne. Folds in cloth tend to be depicted with stylized zig-zag lines. The best known of the statues is the Dama del Cerro de los Santos. The statue stands 1 m and 40 cm tall, holding an offering cup. She is dated to the 3rd or 2nd century BCE, but has a very stylized form reminiscent of earlier Iberian sculpture. According to Jaeggi, the sculpture does not show Italic or Greek influence. The male statues tend to be similar with all wearing the same dress, a pallium held in the right hand. A few have earrings or pendant bullae. There is only one sculpture, holding a short sword, identified as a warrior. There are no complete male statues preserved. Hair on the male figures is depicted as a compact mass with curls depicted with notched lines.

Truszkowski argues that the female sculptures date primarily to the period prior to the Punic Wars and that the shift to male statues, with more Hellenistic styling, occurred during the conflicts.

== Bibliography ==
- Balil, A. (1976). "Cerro de Los Santos". In Stillwell, Richard; MacDonald, William L.; McAlister, Marian Holland (eds.). The Princeton encyclopedia of classical sites. Princeton, N.J.: Princeton University Press.
- Jaeggi, Othmar (2008). "Hellenistic Influences in Iberian Sculpture" (PDF). Bollettino di Archeologia on Line. ISSN 2039-0076. Archived from the original (PDF) on 2017-01-09.
- Truszkowski, Elizabeth (2006). "La sculpture votive du III e au II e siècle dans la péninsule ibérique: le cas du grand sanctuaire du Cerro de los Santos (Albacete)". Pallas (70): 395–413. JSTOR 43684944.
- de la Rada y Delgado, Juan de Dios (1875). Antigüedades del Cerro de los Santos en término de Montealegre. Imprenta de T. Fortanet.
