= Lady of Elche =

Ancient Iberian sculpture

- Dama de Elche
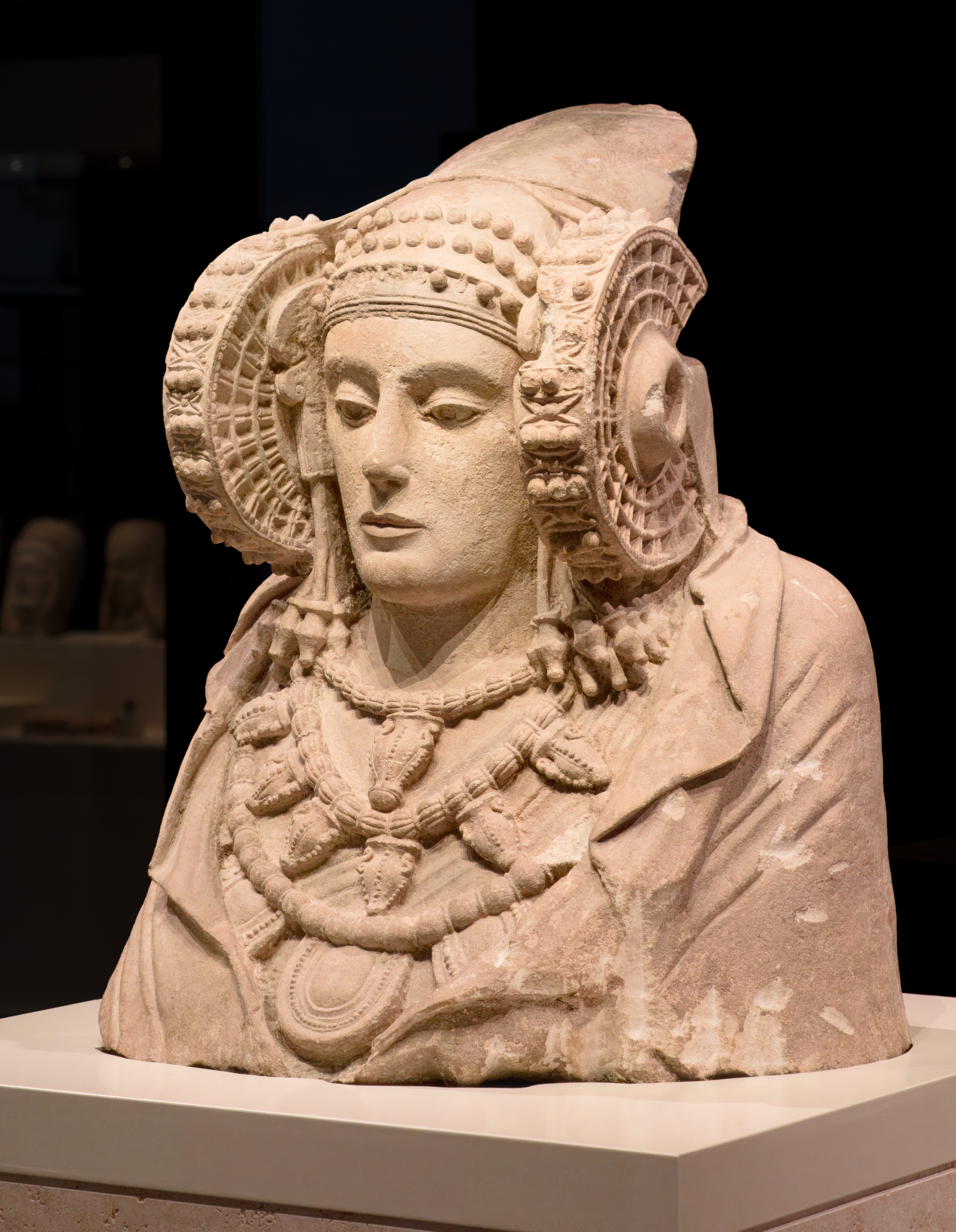
- Type: Bust
- Material: Limestone
- Height: 56 cm (22 in)
- Width: 45 cm (18 in)
- Depth: 37 cm (15 in)
- Weight: 65.08 kg (143.5 lb)
- Discovered: 1897; L’Alcúdia, Elx
- Discovered by: Manuel Campello Esclápez
- Place: National Archaeological Museum
- Culture: Iberians

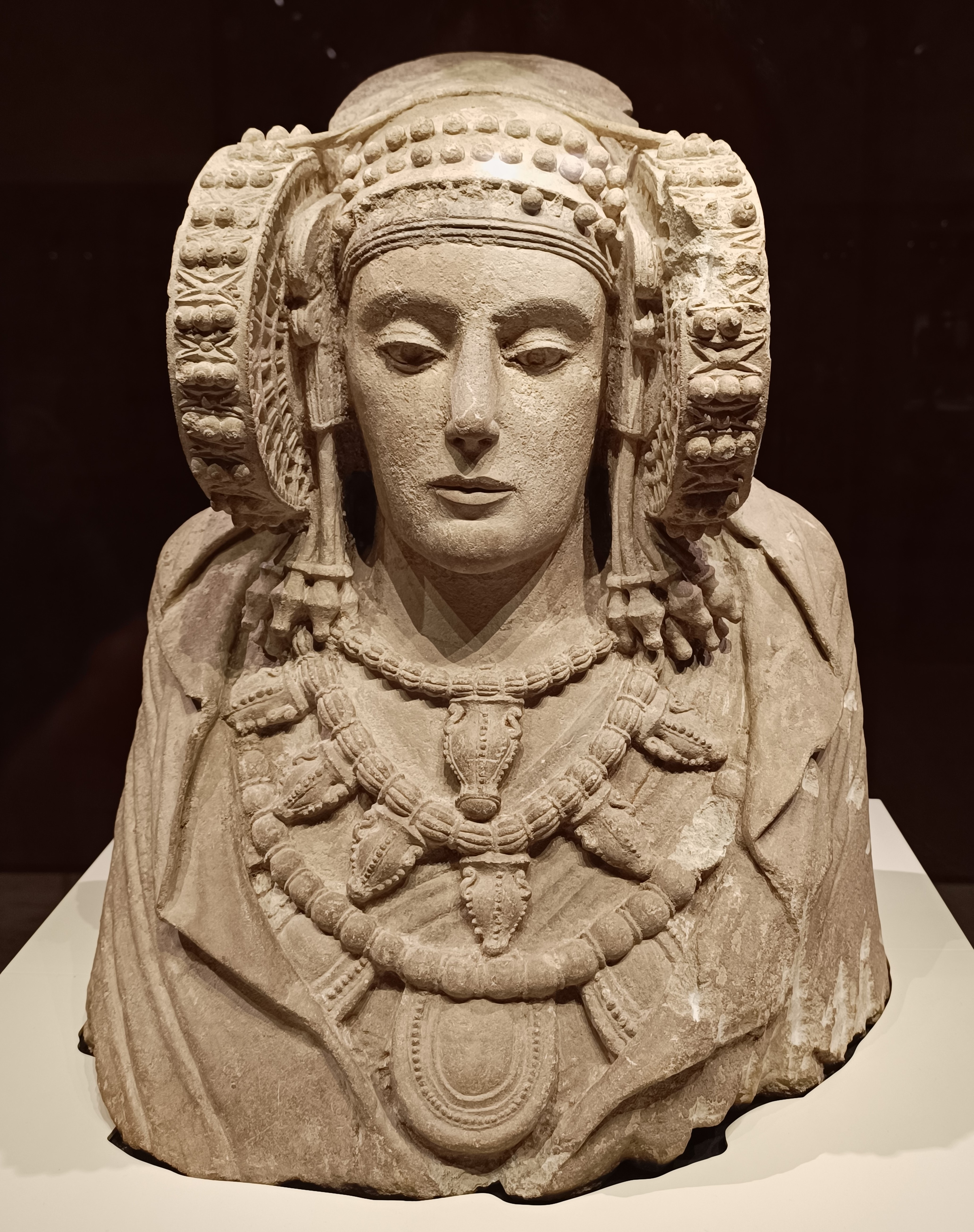
Frontal view

The Lady of Elche (Spanish: Dama de Elche, Valencian: Dama d'Elx) is a limestone bust that was discovered in 1895 in L’Alcúdia, an archaeological site on a private estate two kilometers south of Elche, Spain. It is now exhibited in the National Archaeological Museum of Spain in Madrid.

It is generally known as an Iberian artifact from the 4th century BC, although the artisanship suggests strong Hellenistic influences. According to The Encyclopedia of Religion, the Lady of Elche is believed to have a direct association with Tanit, the goddess of Carthage, who was worshiped by the Punic-Iberians.

== Sculpture ==
The bust, originally colored, represents a woman wearing an elaborate headdress and large wheel-like coils (known as rodetes) on each side of the face. The opening in the rear of the sculpture indicates it may have been used as a funerary urn.

Other artifacts associated with Iberian culture are the Lady of Guardamar—which has similar wheel-like rodetes and necklaces—and the Lady of Baza. While the Lady of Elche is a bust, there are indications that it was part of a seated statue, similar to the Lady of Baza (with which it shares similar necklace pendants) or a standing one like the Great Offering Lady from the Los Santos hill (Montealegre del Castillo, Albacete).

These three figures and the Bicha of Balazote are exhibited in the same Iberian art hall in the National Archaeological Museum of Spain in Madrid.

In 2023, two female stone busts were discovered at the Turuñuelo archeological site in Guareña, Spain, that are somewhat similar to the Lady of Elche, but are about a century earlier, dating to the 5th century BC. They were found in the context of the Tartessos culture. The busts feature details of jewelry and hairstyles, and are thought to be the first facial representations of Tartessian goddesses.

== Discovery and repatriation ==
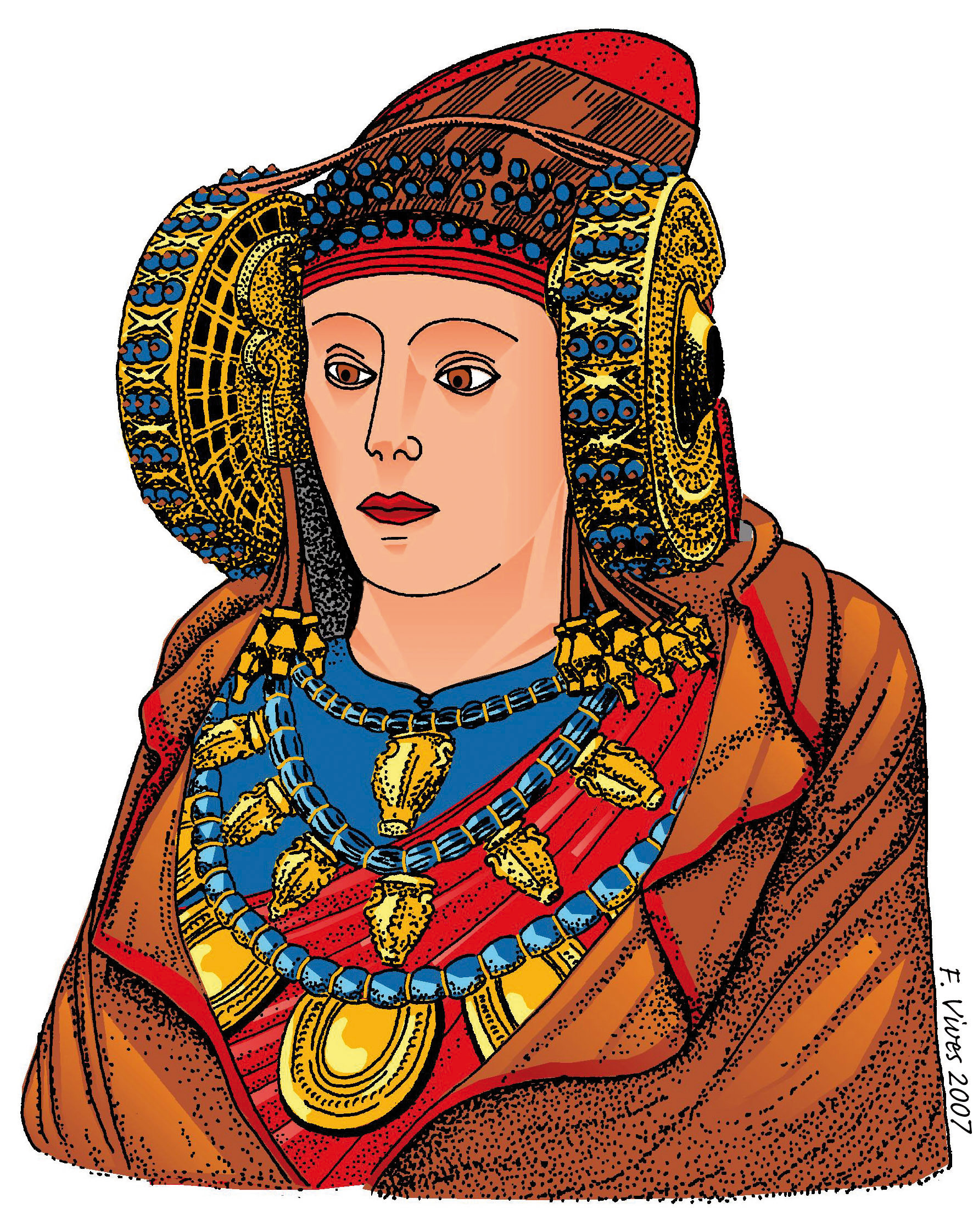
Color reconstruction by Francisco Vives

The sculpture was found on 4 August 1897, by a young worker, Manuel Campello Esclapez. The popular version of the story differs from the official report by Pere Ibarra (the local keeper of the records) which stated that Antonio Maciá found the bust. Ibarra's version of the discovery story, was that farm workers clearing the southeast slope of La Alcudia for agricultural purposes, discovered the sculpture. The bust was quickly nicknamed "Reina Mora" or "Moorish Queen" by locals.

An archaeological site is now located where the bust of Elche was discovered. Evidence has been found there of an Iberian-Punic settlement, a Roman sewer, walls and Roman houses, and mosaics. One mosaic shows an effigy of Saint Abdon, belonging to a Christian basilica of the 5th century. The latter archaeological evidence is supported by the codices of the councils of Toledo where it discusses an audience with bishops from Illici (Elche).

Dr. Campello, owner of the farm, was married to Asunción Ibarra, daughter of Aureliano Ibarra Manzoni, a 19th century humanist and amateur archeologist. Ibarra Manzoni had found a number of objects and Iberian vestiges on his own farmland and in other places in the municipality of Elche. He built up a valuable collection, which he bequeathed to his daughter Asunción. He provided instructions that she make the necessary arrangements for the collection to be offered for sale to the Real Academia de la Historia after her death, to be located finally at the National Archaeological Museum. The will specified that the collection be sold in its entirety. The family placed the Lady on their balcony so that it could be viewed by all of the residents of Elche.

Don Pedro Ibarra invited French archaeologist Pierre Paris to his home to see the Mystery Play of Elche. When the archaeologist saw the Iberian bust, he recognized its worth and notified the Louvre in Paris. The Louvre offered a large sum of money for the time: 4,000 francs, and purchased the sculpture within a few weeks of its discovery. Despite opposition from Doña Asunción, the Iberian bust was sold. On 30 August 1897, the sculpture was sent to the Louvre.

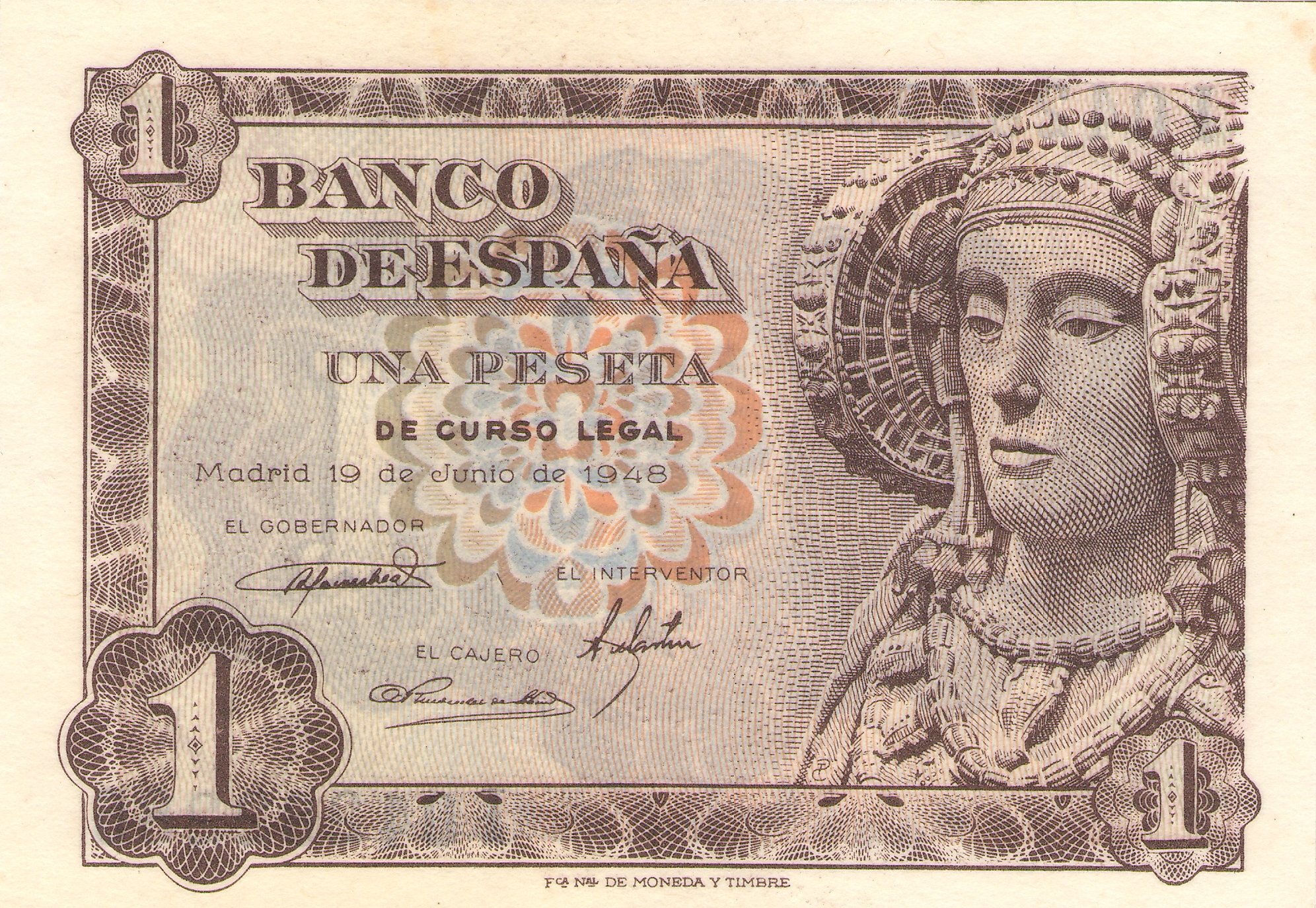
Depicted on the 1 Peseta banknote from 1948.

For 40 years, the Lady of Elche was exhibited at the Louvre. After the start of World War II in 1939, as a precaution, the sculpture was transferred for safe-keeping to the castle of Montauban near Toulouse. The Vichy government negotiated the statue's return to Spain with Franco's government. In 1941, it was returned through an exchange of works, which also included the Immaculate Conception of the Venerable Ones by Murillo, the twin sphinxes of El Salobral and several pieces of the Treasure of Guarrazar, and the Iberian sculptures of Osuna. In return, Spain transferred to France a portrait of Mariana of Austria by Velázquez (the Prado kept another existing version of the portrait, which was considered of superior quality) and a Portrait of Antonio de Covarrubias by El Greco. Since 1941, the Lady of Elche has been officially owned by the Museo del Prado (catalog number E433).

The discovery of the Lady of Elche initiated a popular interest in pre-Roman Iberian culture. She appeared on a 1948 Spanish one-peseta banknote and was mentioned in William Gaddis's The Recognitions (1955).

In 1971, it was transferred from the Prado to the National Archaeological Museum of Spain, where it is currently exhibited.

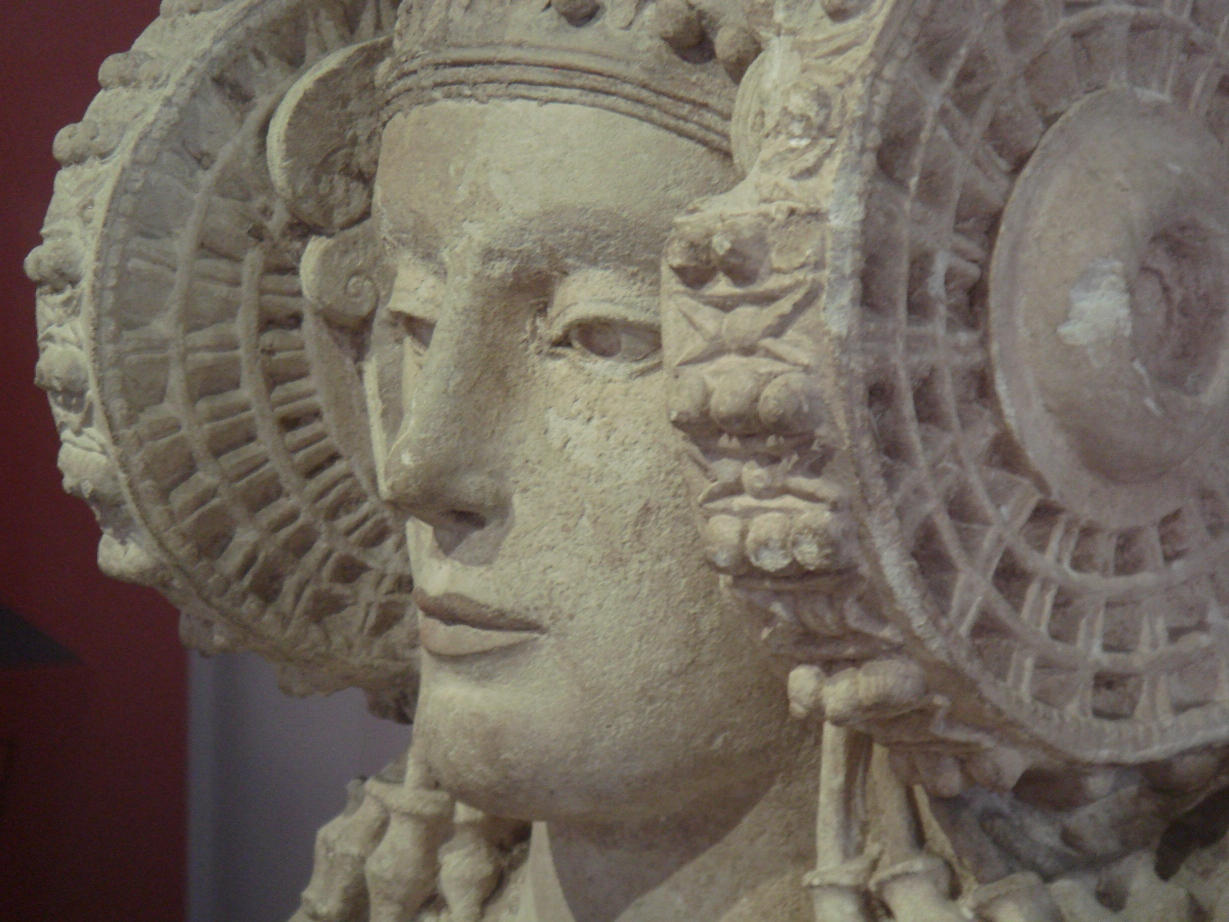
Detail of the Lady of Elche

=== Exhibitions in Elche ===
In 1965, the Lady of Elche returned briefly to Elche, on the occasion of the seventh centenary of Mystery Play of Elche.

On 19 January 2006, the Minister of Culture of Spain, Carmen Calvo, issued a decision to temporarily lease the Lady to its hometown. From 18 May 2006 to 1 November 2006, the Lady of Elche presided over the inauguration of the Museum of Archaeology and History of Elche (in the Palace of Altamira) and the exhibition From Ilici to Elx, 2500 Years of History that took place in different locations in the city. It was represented by an exact replica afterwards.

== Contentions of forgery ==
The bust was first accused of being a forgery in 1906, in an essay called "Las esculturas del Cerro de los Santos, cuestión de autenticidad" by archeologist José Ramón Mélida.

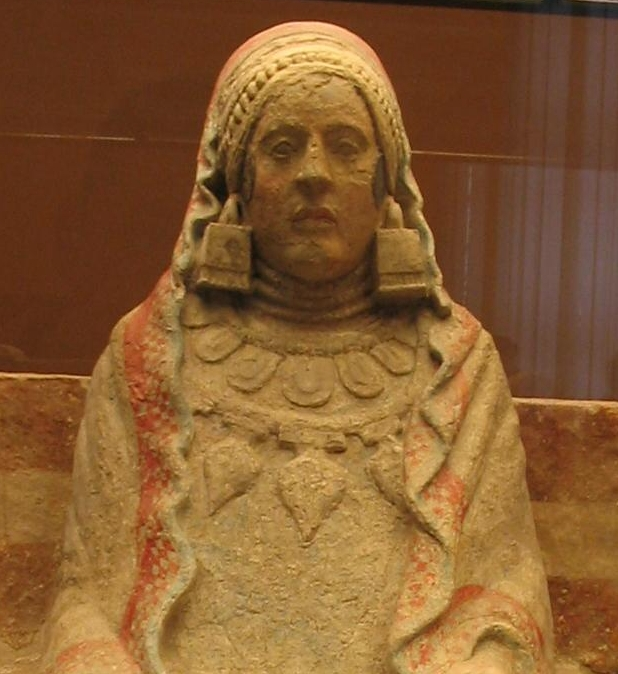
The Lady of Baza, another Iberian "lady" bust.

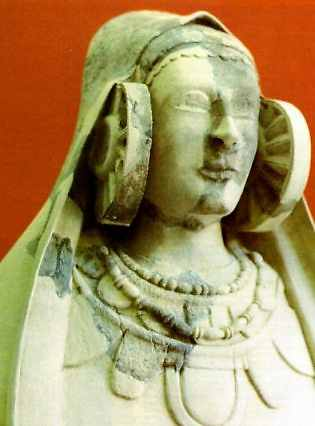
The Lady of Guardamar.

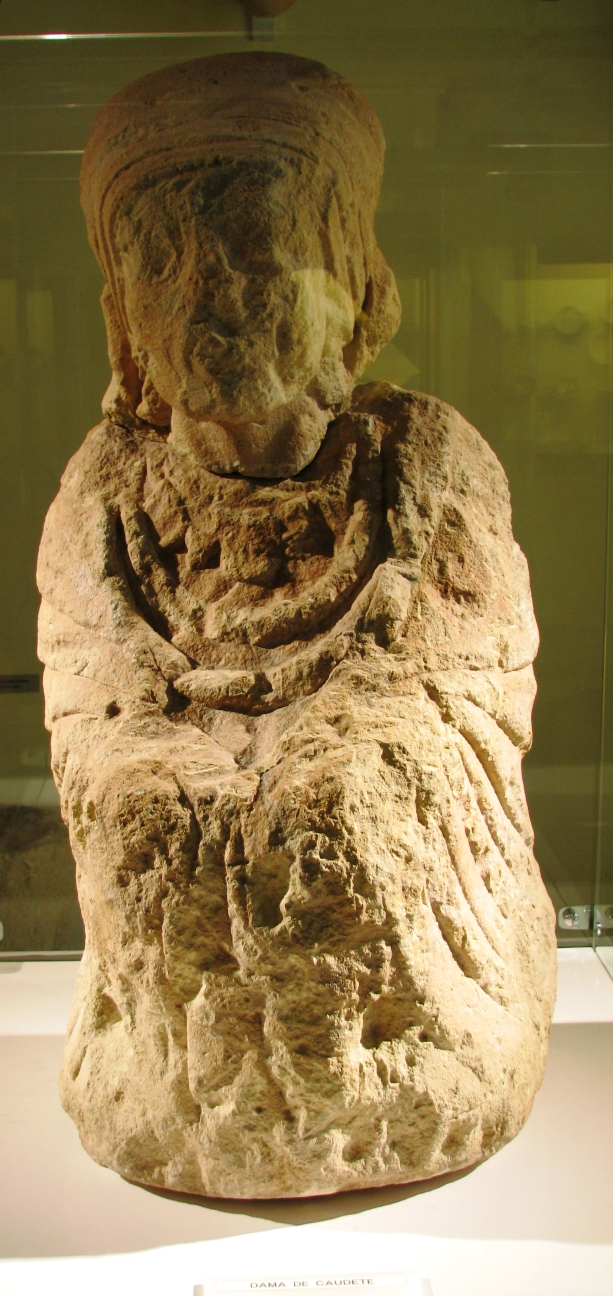
The Lady of Caudete. Villena Archeological Museum.

In 1995, art historian John F. Moffitt (1940–2008) published Art Forgery: The Case of the Lady of Elche (University Press of Florida) in which he contended that the statue was a forgery, citing its stylistic differences from ancient Iberian prototypes. Moffitt suggested that the sculpture could be the work of well-known forger Francisco Pallas y Puig (1859–1926), commissioned by the landowner, Manuel Campello Antón (1833–1904) to coincide with a visit from French archaeologist Pierre Paris, who purchased the sculpture for the Louvre. Moffitt discussed the sculpture in the context of a "golden age" of forgery in the nineteenth and early twentieth century, which followed a growing cultural interest in collecting art and artifacts.

Experts in Spanish archaeology have rejected Moffitt's theory and accept the Lady of Elche as a genuine ancient Iberian work. Antonio Uriarte of the University of Madrid has stated: "Decade by decade, research has reinforced the coherence of the Lady within the corpus of Iberian sculpture. The Lady was found more than a century ago, and many of its features, not then understood, have been confirmed by subsequent finds. For example, the use of paint in Iberian sculpture was unknown when the Lady appeared." A Spanish National Research Council (CSIC) study on the Lady of Elche's micropigmentation published in 2005 concluded that the trace pigments on the statue were consistent with ancient materials and that no modern pigments had been found.

Throughout the 20th century, other similar iberian busts were discovered in the southeast of Spain, such as the Lady of Baza, the Lady of Caudete, the Lady of Guardamar or the Lady of Cerro de los Santos.

In 2011, María Pilar de Luxán, the author of the 2005 study, analyzed microparticles within the back hole of the Lady of Elche, utilizing electron microscopy and X-ray dispersive spectrometry. Luxán deduced that the particles belonged to the ashes of human bones and that they compared with those of the Iberian period. She concluded that the statue was used as a funerary urn in the Iberian period, thus guaranteeing its antiquity and confirming the hypothesis about its function.

In 2017, Sonia Gutiérrez Lloret, chair of the Department of Archaeology at the University of Alicante and director of the University's Institute of Investigation in Archaeology and Historical Heritage-INAPH, wrote about the many discrepancies in the narrative surrounding the sculpture's origin as it evolved into an idealized national symbol. "A story has been built around the Lady that has avoided the obvious uncertainties, if not true contradictions," Gutiérrez Llore said, "but that by dint of being transmitted to future generations has ended up becoming the dominant historical memory, considered truthful, traditional and unquestionable."

== In modern culture ==
The Lady of Elche stands as a statue representing Phoenicia as one of the seafaring nations at the Alexander Hamilton Custom House facade.

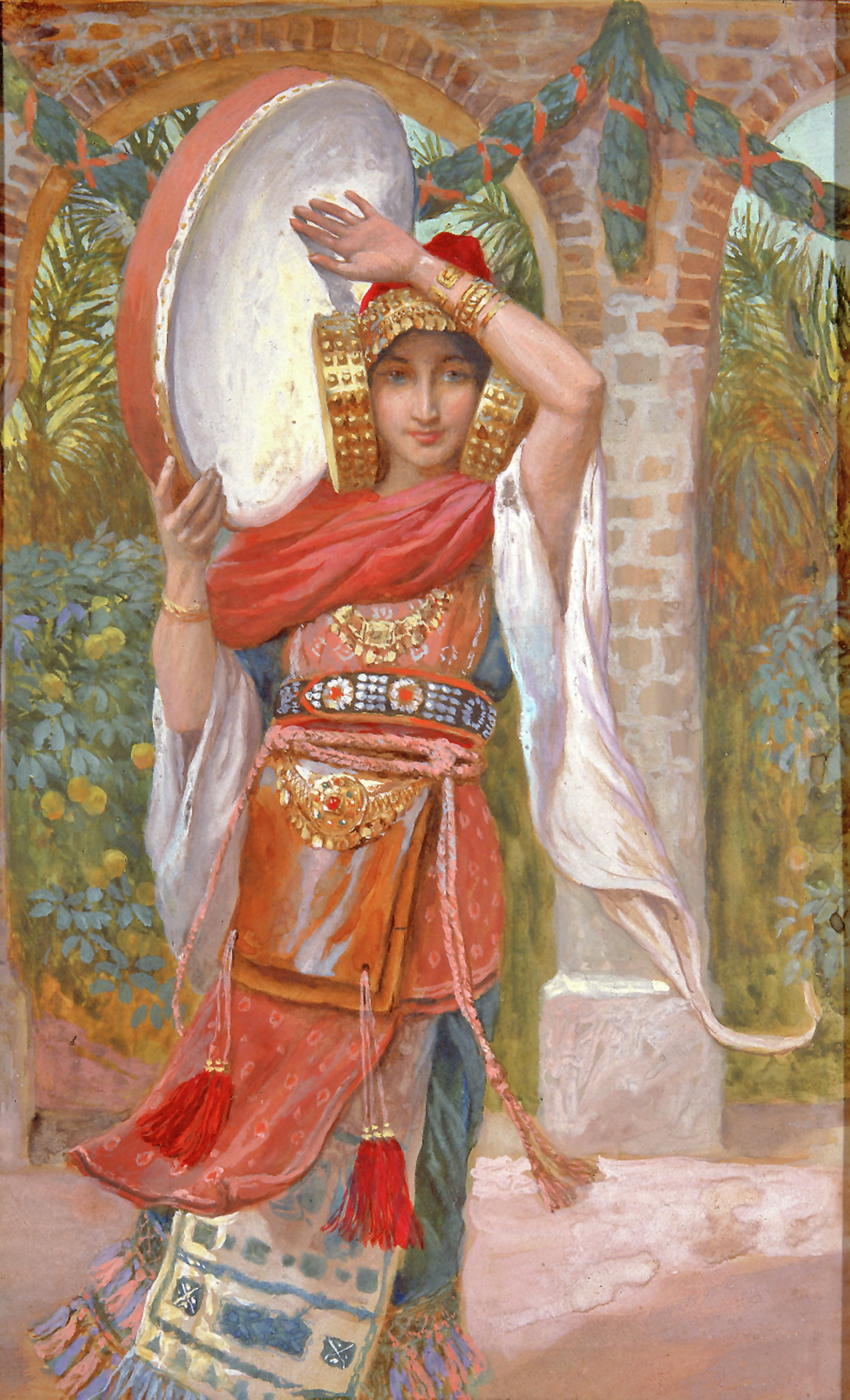
Jephthah's Daughter by James Tissot, based on the Lady of Elche.

French artist James Tissot based figures in several of his turn-of-the-century paintings on the Lady of Elche.

A large prominent sculpture "La Dama Ibérica" based on the Lady of Elche and created by the Spanish sculptor Manolo Valdés in 2007 overlooks a major intersection in the downtown region of Valencia, Spain.

== See also ==
- Contestani
