= Lady of Guardamar =

4th century BCE Iberian sculpture

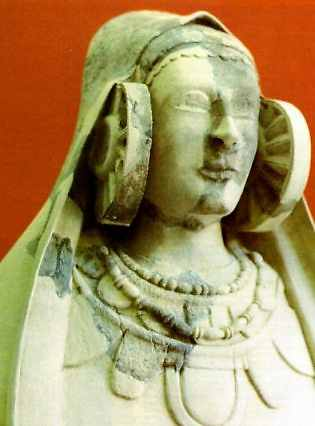
- Material: Limestone
- Height: 50 cm
- Created: 400 – 370 BCE
- Discovered: 22 September 1987; Guardamar del Segura, Valencia, Spain

Lady of Guardamar (Dama de Guardamar), is a limestone female bust, 50 centimetres (20 in) high, dated c. 400-370 BCE. It was discovered in fragments in the Phoenician archaeological site of Cabezo Lucero in Guardamar del Segura in Alicante province, Spain, on September 22, 1987.

A large piece of a stone rodete (wheel headgear) was found first, at a shallow depth. There followed other fragments of the bust of an Iberian lady, and one large piece included the headdress, face and neck, which were found to have similarities to the Iberian bust Lady of Elche. The sculpture had been hammered to fragments and even burnt in places. These fragments were taken to the laboratory of the Archaeological Museum of Alicante, where restorer Vincent Bernabeu began with washing and identifying the bits, first the chin, then the lips, then collar and chest pieces, and many other fragments that did not fit together and were not part of the carved surface. The delicate and painstaking task of restoration began in October 1987 and was completed in June 1988.

The restored sculpture is of fine-grained greyish limestone. The Lady is wearing a tunic with a round neckline. A scalloped headband crosses the brow and connects the rodetes, which represent hollow wheels, probably of thin metal, on each side. Above the headband and rodetes the Lady wears a mantle with finely carved drapery details. The necklaces the Lady wears are each different; one is composed of seven bullae which are all the same except for the central one, which is grooved. Below it is another necklace that has larger bullae, some shaped like curved triangles and some semicircular at the bottom. The string of beads worn second from the neck has olive-shaped, spherical and flat beads, above it is a string of spherical beads with two plates at the center. In real life, these beads would have been made of glassy paste, as such beads often appeared in the Albufereta excavation.

In style, the Lady of Guardamar is a bit more archaic than the other contemporary Iberian sculptures the Lady of Baza or Lady of Elche, with features more Iberian. As nothing from the site is more recent than 300 BCE, and the site flourished between 430 and 350 BCE, it seems likely that the Lady dates from 400 to 370 BCE.

== See also ==
- Iberian sculpture
- Carthaginian Iberia
