= Battle of Carteia (naval) =

206 BC naval battle of the Second Punic War

- Part of the Second Punic War
Date	206 BC
Location	Carteia 36.1603°N 5.4151°W
Result	Roman victory

Belligerents
Roman Republic	Carthage

Commanders and leaders
Gaius Laelius	Adherbal

Strength
1 quinquereme 7 triremes	1 quinquereme 8 triremes

The Battle of Carteia was a naval battle of the Second Punic War, fought between the navy of the Roman Republic and a Carthaginian fleet in 206 BC near the ancient city of Carteia in southern Spain. The Roman navy was commanded by Gaius Laelius and the Carthaginian navy by Adherbal. The battle resulted in a Roman victory.

== Context ==
After the Carthaginian defeat at the Battle of Ilipa, the Turdetani flocked en masse to the Roman banner. Hasdrubal Gisco and Mago, son of Hamilcar, were thereafter confined with their troops to Gades where they were protected from a Roman assault. After the Revolt of Sucro and the Revolt of Indíbil and Mandonio, Publius Cornelius Scipio sent Lucius Marcius Septimus with a small force uninhibited by baggage so as to augment their speed down the Guadalquivir River to the river mouth where he encountered the Carthaginian prefect Hanno (not to be confused with Hanno the Elder) who was attempting to recruit mercenaries for Mago. The Battle of Guadalquivir ensued resulting in another Carthaginian defeat.

Gaius Laelius was, at this time, in command of a small fleet of one quinquereme and seven triremes. He sailed to the port of Carteia where the local Punic population conspired to provide access to their city to the Romans. Mago discovered their conspiracy and the responsible parties were detained, locked up, and deported to Carthage by a fleet commanded by Adherbal, the governor of Gades. This fleet was composed of one quinquereme and eight triremes.

== The battle ==
When the Carthaginian navy was spotted leaving Carteia, Laelius' fleet gave battle in a formation where his own quinquereme was at the head of his fleet. He successfully surprised Adherbal, who was obliged to fight as the sea currents made an escape impossible.

The clashing of the fleets was a chaotic affair as the triremes jockeyed about with difficulty. There were numerous smaller battles between the ships and acts of bravery on both sides. After some time, Laelius' quinquereme was able to sink two of the Carthaginian triremes and to incapacitate a third.

Adherbal, conceding defeat, aimed his ship's bow towards the African coast and fled the action. Laelius made his way back to Carteia, where he was informed that the conspiracy at Gades had been discovered and that the responsible parties had been sent off to Carthage.

== Consequences ==
Scipio gave Laelius and Marcius orders to retire. Mago embarked the last of his forces, consisting of a few thousand troops, and departed for Cartago Nova. There he anchored his fleet and disembarked his troops to lay siege to the city, which was under Roman control. The Carthaginian army was repulsed at the Battle of Cartagena in 206 BC.

Mago returned to Gades, where he found that the local population had shut the gates on him, as they had been in negotiations with the Romans. Shortly thereafter, Mago abandoned the city and sailed to the Balearic Islands, spending the winter at Maó-Mahón. The following year, he sailed north to Italy, where he hoped to instigate the Ligures to revolt against the Romans.

== See also ==
- Punic Wars
- Gaius Laelius
