= Aderbal =

- Gender: Male
- Language: Punic

Other names
- Variant form: Adherbal
- Derived: Adherbal

Aderbal is a Portuguese-language masculine given name, derived from the Punic name Adherbal.

In the Portuguese language, Aderbal is the current spelling, being Adherbal an archaic version of the name.

- Aderbal Freire Filho (1941 – 2023), a Brazilian actor, theatrical director and television presenter.
- Estádio Aderbal Ramos da Silva, better known as Estádio da Ressacada, a football stadium in Florianópolis, Santa Catarina state, Brazil.
