= Adherbal =

Adherbal (Punic: 𐤀𐤃𐤓𐤁𐤏𐤋, ʿDRBʾL) may refer to:

- Adherbal (admiral), Carthaginian admiral during the First Punic War
- Adherbal (governor), governor of Gades during the Second Punic War
- Adherbal (king of Numidia), reigned 118 to 112 BC
- Adherbal roy de Numidie, a 17th-century play by French dramatist François Joseph Lagrange-Chancel

== See also ==
- Aderbal
