= Lady of Cerro de los Santos =

2nd-century BCE Iberian sculpture

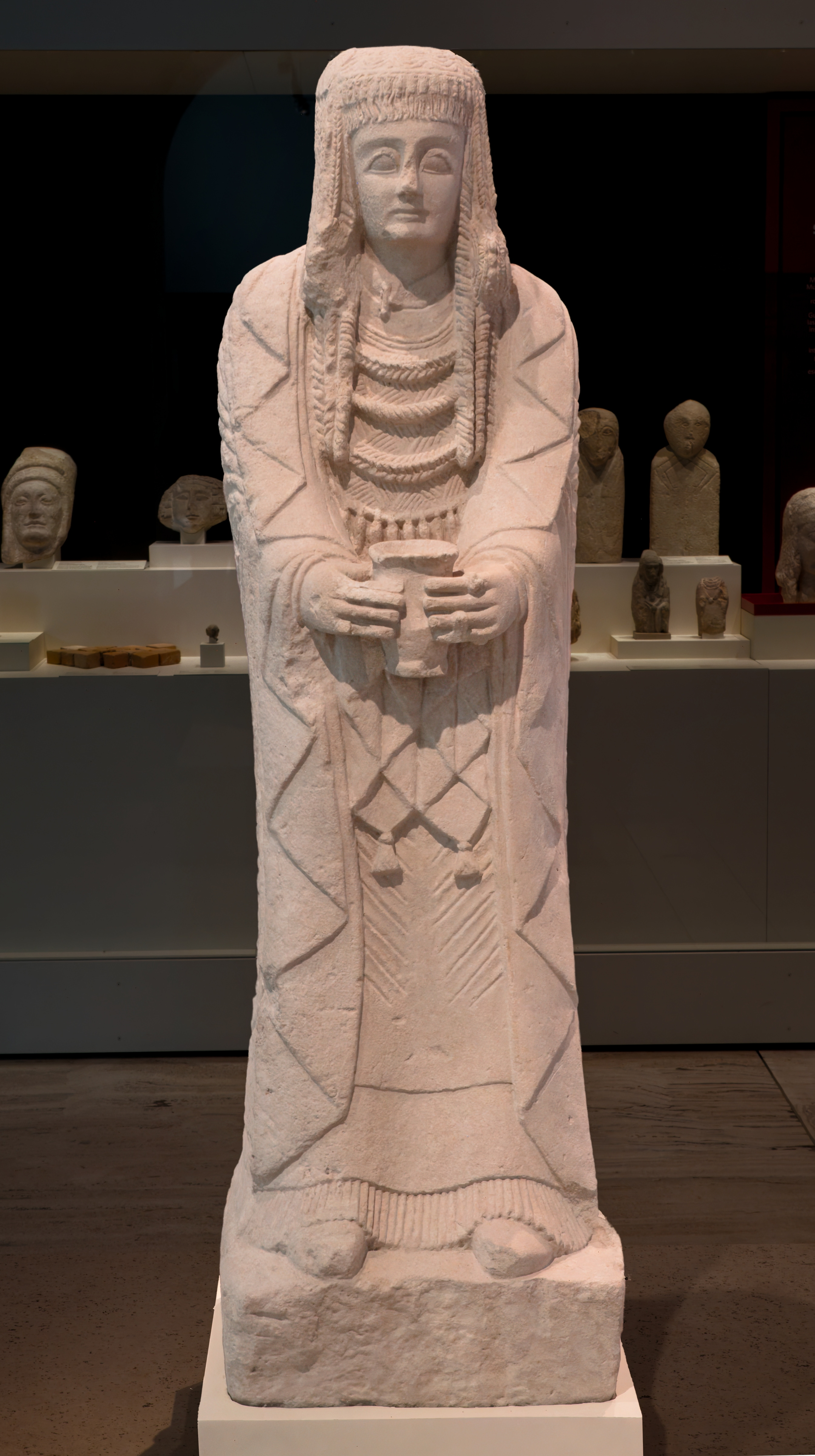
Dama del Cerro de los Santos

The Lady of Cerro de los Santos (Dama del Cerro de los Santos), also known as Gran Dama Oferente, is an Iberian sculpture from the 2nd century BCE, that is now in National Archaeological Museum in Madrid.

This limestone sculpture depicts a full-length standing female figure 1.3 metres high. It was found in 1870 in the sanctuary of Cerro de los Santos in Montealegre del Castillo in Albacete province, Spain.

The statue is sometimes called the Gran Dama Oferente because she is holding a container in her two hands and appears to be offering it. She is richly clad in three overlapping robes clasped with a fibula, or brooch, at the neck. Braided hair falls past her three necklaces. She is wearing fitted shoes. A rodete or wheel headgear appears on one side of her hair; if there was a similar one on the other side, it has been broken off. Like another contemporary Phoenician-influenced Iberian female sculpture, the Lady of Baza, her drapery falls in a zigzag pattern.

== See also ==
- Carthaginian Iberia
- Lady of Elche
- Iberian sculpture
