= Yecla =

- Municipality
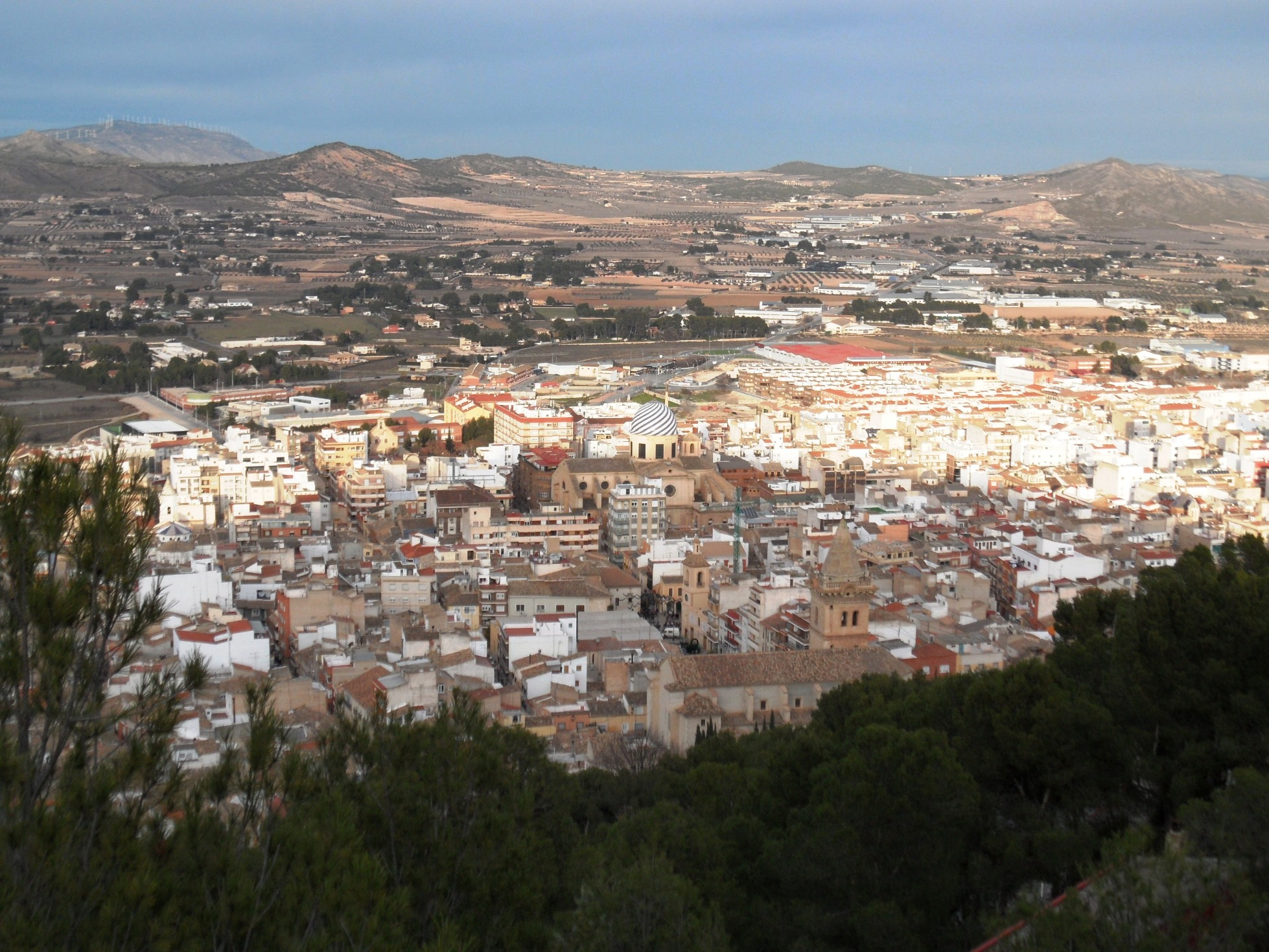
- Town hall

- Flag Coat of arms

- Location in Murcia

- Location in Murcia Location in Spain
- Coordinates: 38°36′36″N 1°06′52″W
- Country: Spain
- A. community: Region of Murcia
- Province: Region of Murcia
- Comarca: Altiplano murciano
- Judicial district: Yecla

Government
  - Mayor: María Remedios Lajara Domínguez (2021)

Area
  - Total: 607.7 km^{2} (234.6 sq mi)
- Elevation: 602 m (1,975 ft)

Population (2025-01-01)
  - Total: 36,453
  - Density: 59.99/km^{2} (155.4/sq mi)
- Demonym: Yeclanos
- Website: Official website

Yecla (Spanish pronunciation: [ˈɟʝe.kla]) is a town and municipality in eastern Spain with 35,243 people registered, in the extreme north of the autonomous community of Murcia, located 96 km from the capital of the region, Murcia.

== Toponymy ==
The origin of the term Yecla comes from the Arabic Yakka, which was the name of a fortress located in the place that is now called Cerro del Castillo. This toponym, however, is not from Arabic origin and it is very likely that it derives from the pre-Roman terms Iko or Ika.

The most important mountains of the locality are Sierra de Salinas (1,238 m), Monte Arabí (1,065 m), Sierra de la Magdalena (1,038 m), and others. The chief buildings are a half-ruined citadel, a modern parish church with a pillared Corinthian facade, and a town hall standing in a fine arcaded plaza mayor (square). Yecla has traditionally had a thriving trade in grain, wine, oil, fruit and other agricultural products produced in the surrounding country. Since the second half of the 20th century, furniture making has become a local trade.

== Monuments ==
- Mayor Square: monumental gathering renascentist and baroque on the heart of historical center. In the square, followed by ayuntamiento building 16th century, there are also located the Alarcos Palace, the Lonja and the clock tower.
- Concha Segura Theatre: In 1890, the architect Justo Millán Espinosa, improved the theatre front and, in 1899, the theatre, received the name of “Concha Segura” as tribute.
- Castle: Remains of fortified square of the old andalusí population of HisnYakka (11th century).
- Old Church: Is a civil monument, not religious as there haven't been any events from 1936, the year when it was ransacked and burned in revolts that took place after the revolutionary rise on 16 March of that same year. Until that year it had been called Reitoria do Salvador, before Our Lady of Cathedral of the Immaculate: best known as the “New Church” which is the main temple of the city, built between 1775 and 1868 with neoclassic style. The building base is cross shaped.
- Castle Sanctuary: a temple built in the 19th century by a hermit.

== Economy ==
Yecla, with neighboring Jumilla, is one of the primary regions for development of the Murciana and Granadina breeds of dairy goats.

Since the mid-19th century Yecla was consolidated as an agricultural municipality, in particular with the wine production. The main cultures in the region are vines, olive trees, almonds and cereals. In the mid-19th century a new sector rose with the expansion of Yecla. The wood craftsmen have fostered the furniture industry and today Yecla is known by its great furniture production.

Yecla is also a wine-producing region, another attribute it shares with close by Jumilla

== Politics: Town Councilors ==
Municipal elections results in 2023 PP 9 PSOE 7 VOX 3 IU 0

== Twin towns ==
- Vinaròs, Spain
- Eibar, Spain
- El Barco de Ávila, Spain

== Notable people ==
- Eva Navarro (born 2001), footballer for the Spain national team

== See also ==
- Yeclano Deportivo
- Yecla (DO)
- List of municipalities in the Region of Murcia
