= Carteia =

Phoenician and Roman town

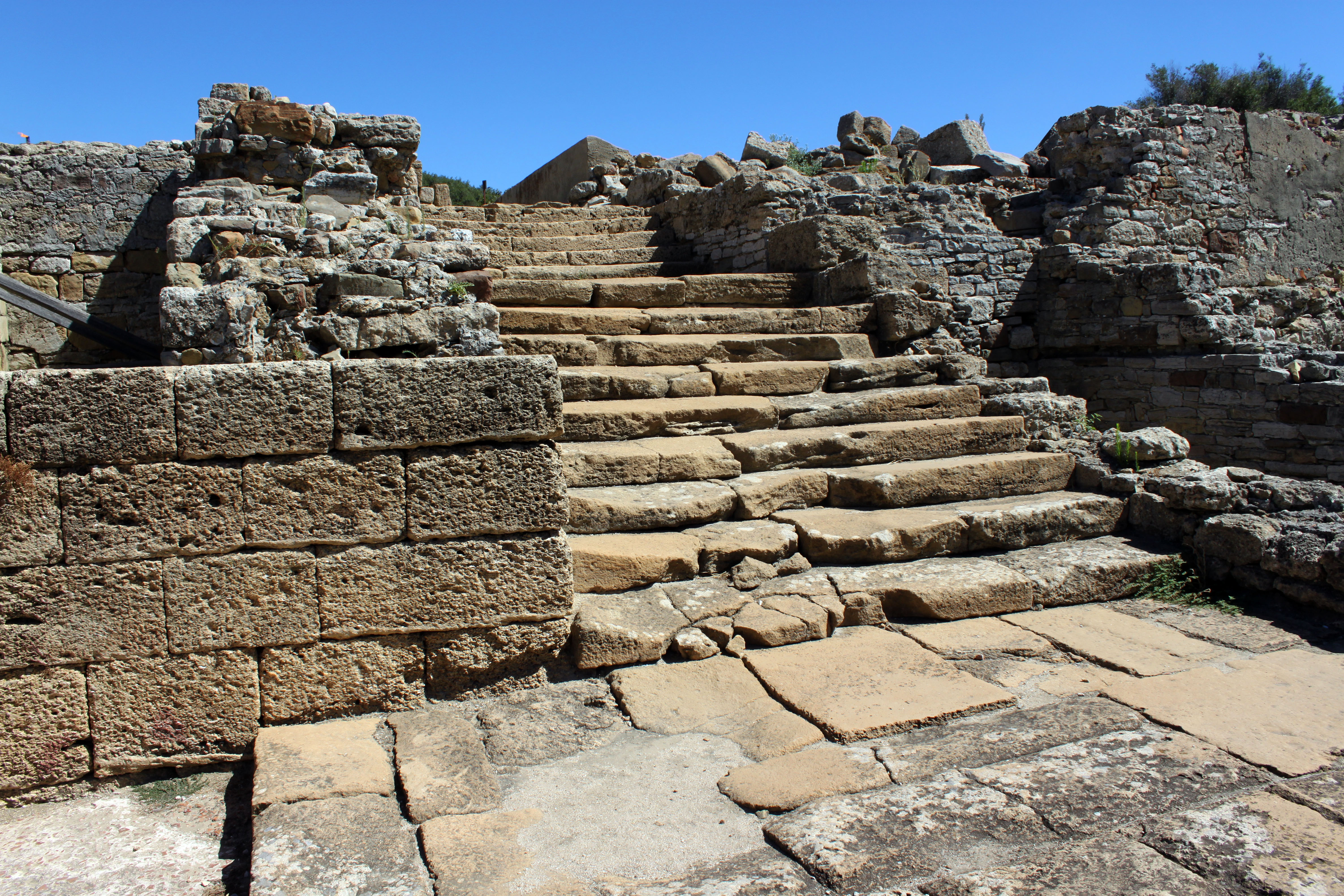
- Roman forum in Carteia.

- Location within Spain
- 36.185524°N 5.408301°W
- Type: Settlement
- Cultures: Phoenician; Carthaginian; Roman
- Location: San Roque, Province of Cádiz, Andalusia, Spain

History
- Built: 940 BC

Site notes
- Condition: Partially excavated remains
- Public access: Yes

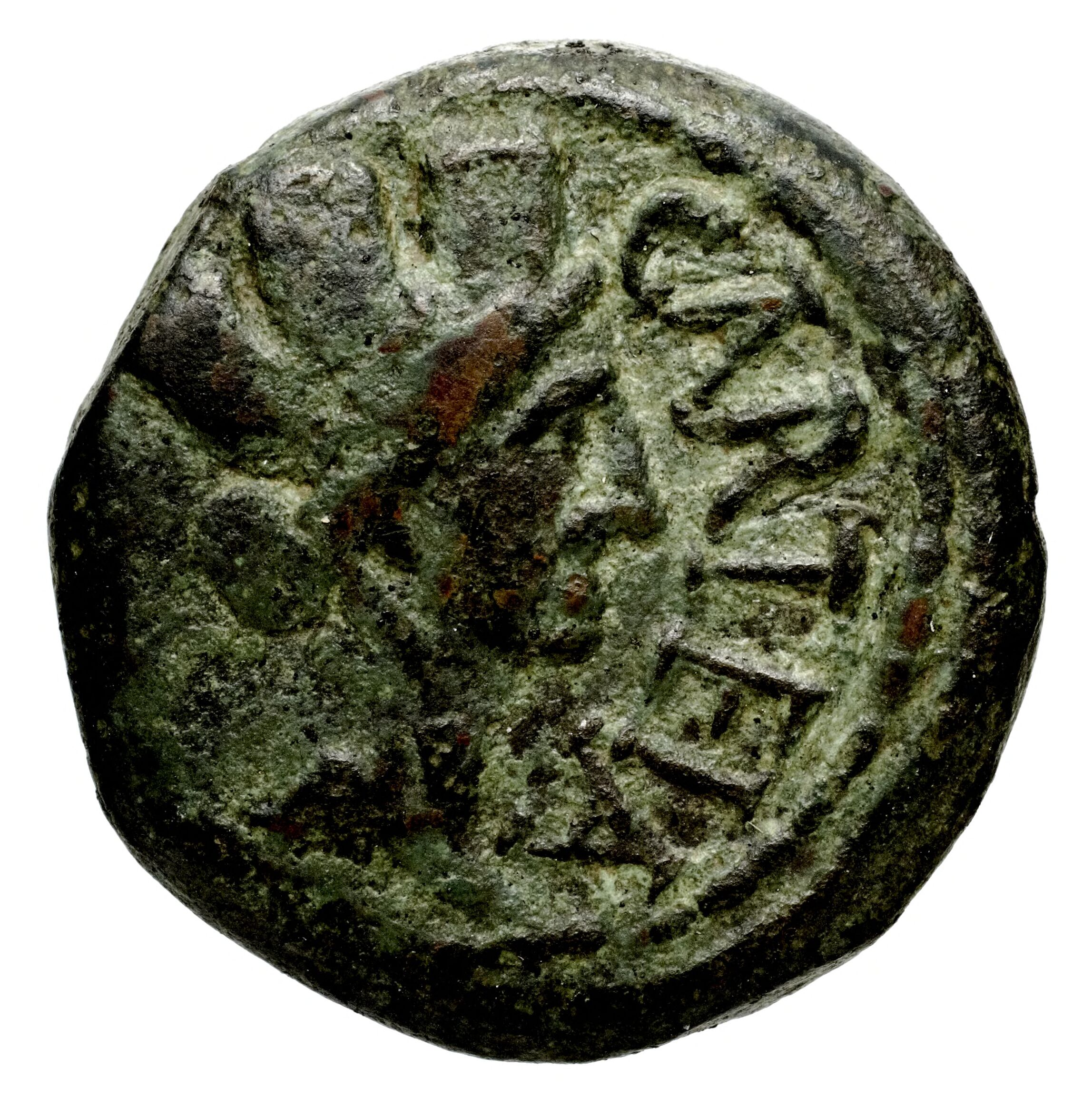
A coin of Carteia

Carteia (Ancient Greek: Καρτηίᾳ) was a Phoenician and Roman town at the head of the Bay of Gibraltar in Spain. It was established at the most northerly point of the bay, next to the town of San Roque, about halfway between the modern cities of Algeciras and Gibraltar, overlooking the sea on elevated ground at the confluence of two rivers, nowadays called Guadarranque and Cachon.

According to Strabo, it was founded around 940 BC as the trading settlement of Kʿrt (meaning "city" in the Phoenician language; compare Carthage and Cartagena). The area had much to offer a trader; the hinterland behind Carteia, in the modern south of Andalusia, was rich in wood, cereals, oranges, lemons, lead, iron, copper and silver. Dyes were another much sought-after commodity, especially those from the murex shellfish, used to make the prized Tyrian purple. Strabo and Pomponius Mela, mention that some believe that Carteia used to be the Tartessos. Pliny the Elder writes that Carteia was called by the Greeks Tartessos.

The town's strategic location meant that it played a significant role in the wars between Carthage and the Roman Republic in the 2nd and 3rd centuries BC. It may have been the site of Hamilcar's landing with his army and elephants in 237 BC, and in 206 BC the Carthaginian admiral Adherbal retreated there with the remnants of his fleet after being defeated by Gaius Laelius in the Battle of Carteia. Around 190 BC, the town was captured by the Romans.

== Roman and medieval period ==
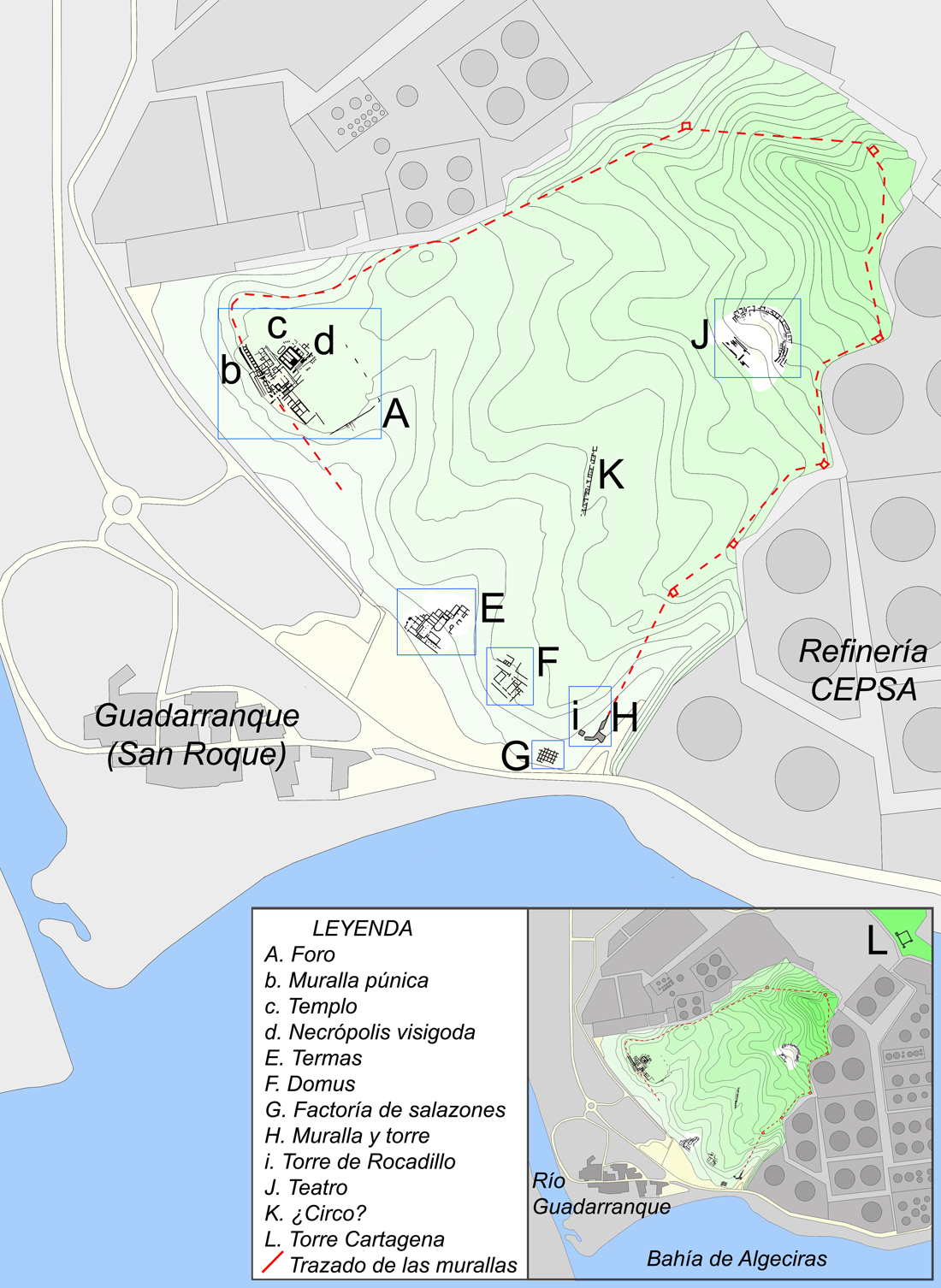
Plan of the site

Livy records that in 171 BC, the Roman Senate was petitioned by a group of Romano-Spanish people, the sons of Roman soldiers and Spanish women. Although they were of Roman descent they were not regarded as Roman citizens, nor were they allowed to marry Roman citizens. The Senate responded by elevating Carteia to the status of a colonia (Roman colony) and granting around 4,000 Romano-Spanish people the right to live there and receive a grant of land on a similar basis to Roman colonists.

The existing inhabitants were permitted to remain there, while all of the inhabitants were given the right to marry Roman citizens and to carry on trade with Romans. This marked a significant innovation for Rome's overseas colonies; the Carteians were the first outside Italy to receive a civic status known as the Latin Rights, halfway between being a non-citizen provincial and a full Roman citizen. Other cities in Spain were later granted a similar status.

The Colonia Libertinorum Carteia (Freedmen's Colony of Carteia) prospered for another 580 years under Roman rule. It grew to become a substantial city which served as a centre for the export of local wines, shipped in amphorae fired in large kilns found on the site, and the manufacture of garum fish sauce. Carteia acquired a mint, amphitheatre, temples and port, and played a significant role in late Roman Republican affairs. Pompey made it his western base for his campaign against Mediterranean pirates in 68 BC. His sons Gnaeus and Sextus raised an army there in 45 BC before being defeated by Julius Caesar at the Battle of Munda. While Gnaeus was captured and executed, Sextus escaped via Carteia's port and fled north to the Pyrenees.

Little is known of the remainder of Carteia's Roman history, but it appears to have been sacked by the Visigoths around 409 AD, by which time it was probably already in decline. Nonetheless, archaeological evidence shows that urban life continued there into the medieval period. The foundations of an early Christian basilica have been found, a Visigothic necropolis exists near one of the Roman temples, and Byzantine remains discovered at the site show its continued occupation when Carteia was incorporated into the Byzantine province of Spania during the 6th-7th centuries.

In the 9th century, after the Umayyad conquest of Hispania, Islamic sources referred to the town – which was probably not much more than a village by then – as Qartayanna or Cartagena. The Marinids constructed a tower nearby, known today as the Torre de Cartagena, using stones from the ruined Roman walls.

== Rediscovery and current condition ==
The site of Carteia was rediscovered by a young British Army officer, John Conduitt, who served in Gibraltar as commissary to the garrison between April 1713 to early 1717. He identified the city as having stood on a hill then known as El Rocadillo, which Richard Ford described in his A Handbook for Travellers in Spain (1845):

The coast road is intersected by the rivers Guadaranque and Palmones; on crossing the former is the eminence El Rocadillo, now a farm, and corn grows where once Carteia flourished ... The remains of an amphitheatre, and the circuit of walls about 2 miles, may yet be traced. The Moors and Spaniards have alike destroyed the ruins, working them up as a quarry in building Algeciras and San Roque. The coins found here are very beautiful and numerous ... Mr. Kent, of the port-office at Gibraltar, formed a Carteian museum, consisting of medals, pottery, glass, &c.

Conduitt communicated his discovery to the Royal Society in London and was invited to read a paper on Carteia on his return to the capital. He did so on 20 June 1717, with Sir Isaac Newton in attendance as chair. Coincidentally, Newton was also interested in Carteia, as he was in the middle of writing his work The Chronology of Ancient Kingdoms, and he invited Conduitt to his home to discuss the ancient city. It was there that Conduitt met Newton's niece, Catherine Barton. After a whirlwind courtship the two were married on 26 August 1717, though Barton was almost a decade older than Conduitt, albeit still renowned for her beauty.

An early 19th-century writer, the anonymous "Calpensis", described how he had "often walked over the site of Carteia, attracted by the rich variety of broken pieces of marble scattered over the fields. Part of the wall enclosing the farm-house was then rudely made up of broken pillars, columns and cornices, of marble of the finest workmanship."

Some of the earliest excavations were carried out at the behest of the British; in 1811–12, Vice-Admiral Charles Penrose reached agreement with the estate's owners to allow amateur antiquarians from Gibraltar to "excavate and examine any part of its ground for antiquities." The excavations found the remains of a tessellated Roman pavement, which was thought to belong to a temple, as well as foundations of Roman buildings.

Although the area around Carteia was open farmland in the time of "Calpensis", it is now heavily industrialised. The site of Carteia is surrounded on three sides by an oil refinery. It was not given protection until as late as the 1960s, by which time the necropolis and city gates had been lost to encroaching development. However, the main urban area has been preserved and can be visited. A number of significant structures can still be seen, including the original Carthaginian city gate, a monumental sandstone flight of steps leading down to what was possibly the forum, a large temple, a number of houses and an extensive Roman baths. The 16th century Torre de Rocadillo can also be seen. From 1971 to 1974, excavations were carried out which found part of a bust of the Emperor Augustus and a headless statue of a man wearing a toga. The Carteia Archaeological Museum in San Roque displays archaeological finds from the site.
