= Portrait of Antonio de Covarrubias =

Painting by El Greco

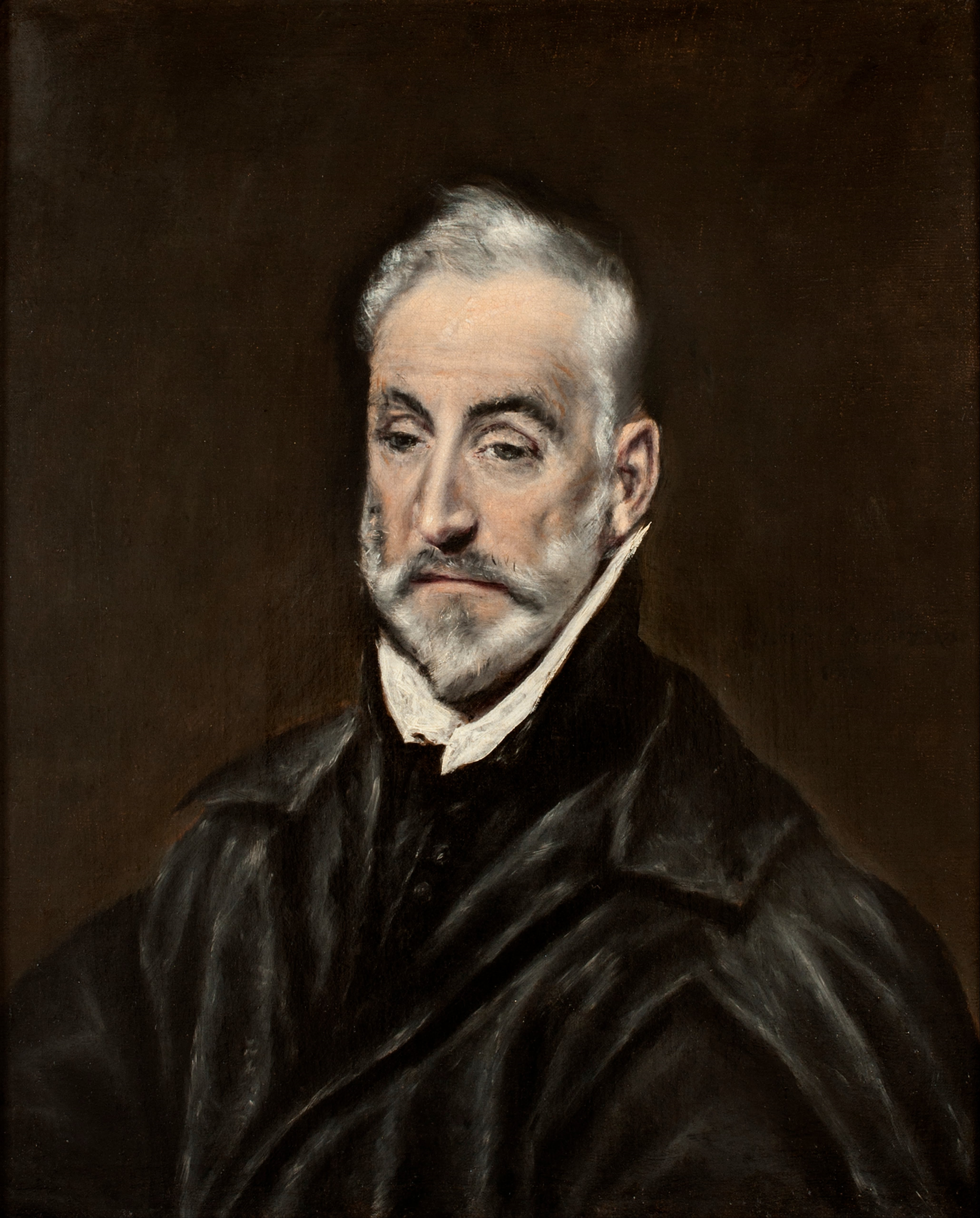
- Artist: El Greco
- Year: 1595-1600
- Medium: oil on canvas
- Dimensions: 65 cm × 52 cm (26 in × 20 in)
- Location: Louvre, Paris
- Website: louvre.fr/...cl010062660

Portrait of Antonio de Covarrubias is a 1595-1600 oil on canvas painting by El Greco, dating to his time in Toledo. It is now in the Louvre in Paris as the result of an exchange with Spanish museums in 1941.

The subject, Antonio de Covarrubias y Leiva, was one of the most notable jurists in Toledo, a professor of law at the University of Salamanca, a member of the Council of Castile, a teacher at Toledo Cathedral, brother of Diego de Covarrubias and a personal friend of the painter. Another portrait of him by El Greco is to be found in the El Greco Museum in Toledo, whilst he is also said to be one of the figures shown in his The Burial of Count Orgaz. The neutral background shows the influence of Titian and the Venetian school.

== See also ==
- List of works by El Greco
