= Carthaginian Iberia =

Carthaginian province

Iberia
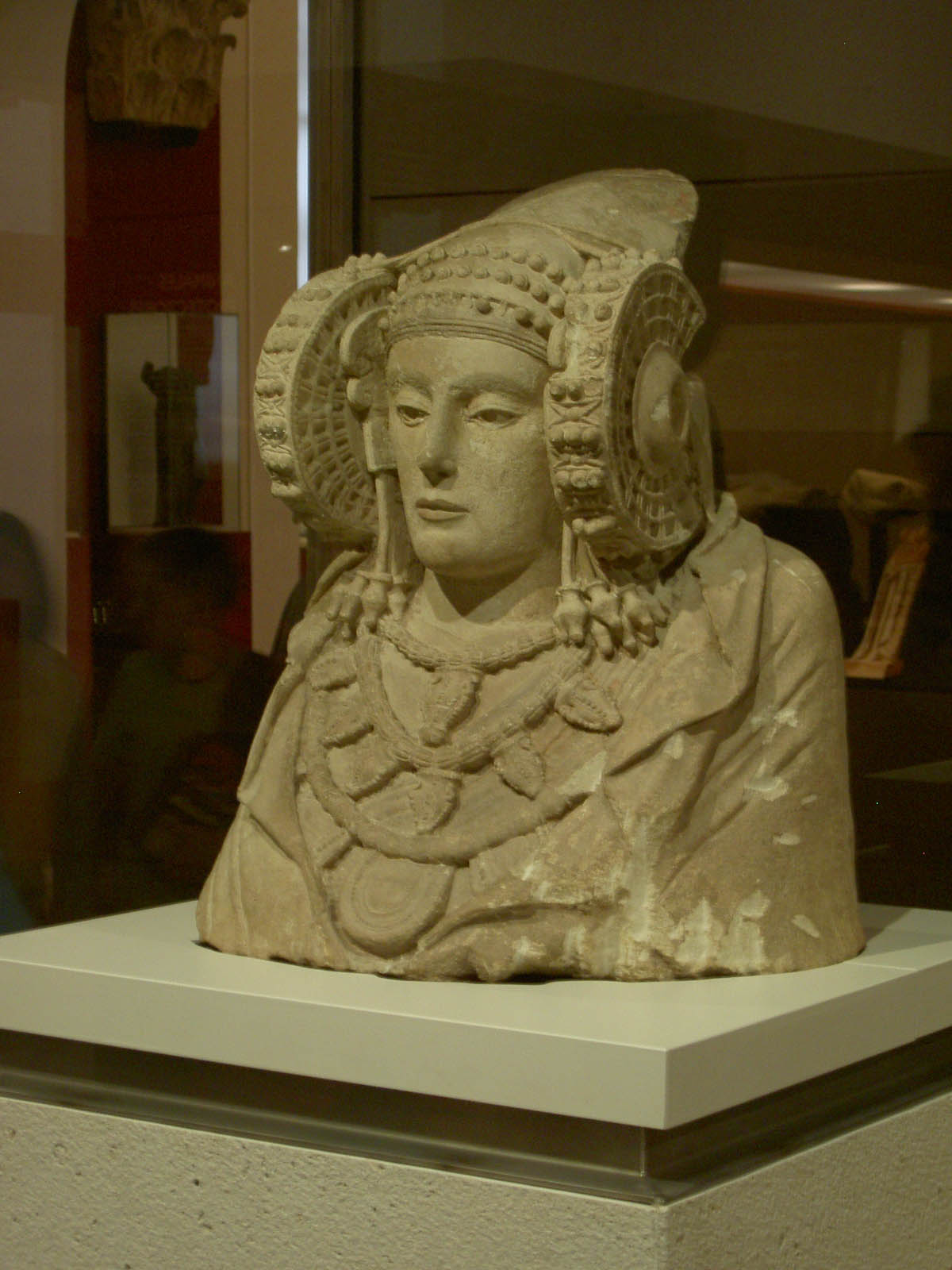
- Iberian Lady of Elche, 4th century BC, perhaps influenced by Carthaginian

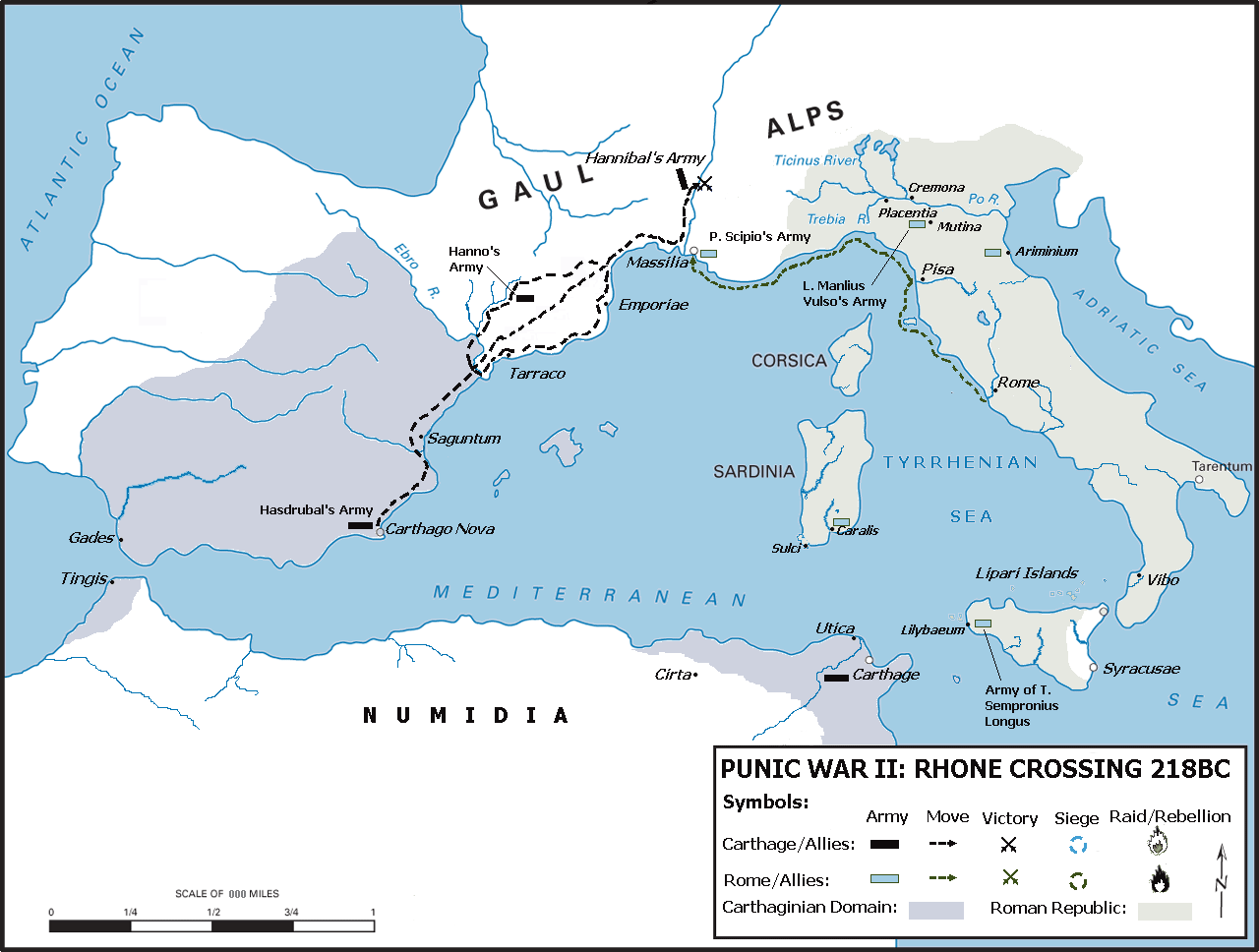
- Map of the western Mediterranean and Carthaginian control of Iberia at its greatest extent, 217 BC
- Empire: Carthaginian
- Established: 575 BC

Carthaginian Iberia was a province of the larger Carthaginian Empire. The Carthaginians conquered the Mediterranean part of Iberia and remained there until the Second Punic war and the Roman conquest of the peninsula.

== Background ==
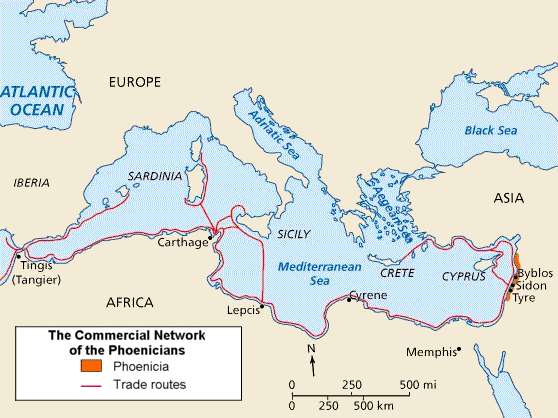
Phoenician trade routes

The Phoenicians were a people from the eastern Mediterranean who were mainly traders from the cities of Tyre, Sidon, and Byblos. They established many trading colonies around the Mediterranean Sea, including colonies in Spain. In the year 814 BC, they founded the city of Carthage on the north African coast in what is now Tunisia. After the fall of Phoenicia to the Babylonians and then the Persians, Carthage became the most powerful Phoenician city in the Mediterranean and the Carthaginians annexed many of the other Phoenician colonies around the coasts of the western Mediterranean, such as Hadrumetum and Thapsus. They also annexed territory in Sicily, Africa, and Sardinia. The city of Qart Hadasht (Phoenician: 𐤒𐤓𐤕𐤟𐤇𐤃𐤔𐤕 QRT𐤟ḤDŠT; meaning 'New Town', the same name as the original city of Carthage) was founded around 227 BC by the Carthaginian Hasdrubal the Fair and became the current day city of Cartagena.

== Expansion into Iberia ==
After the defeat of Carthage in the First Punic War, the Carthaginian general Hamilcar Barca crushed a mercenary revolt in Africa and trained a new army consisting of Numidians along with mercenaries and other infantry. In 236 BC, he led an expedition to Iberia where he hoped to gain a new empire for Carthage to compensate for the territories that had been lost in the recent conflicts with Rome and to serve as a base for vengeance against the Romans. His success on the peninsula began at the city of Gadir.

In eight years, by force of arms and diplomacy, Hamilcar secured an extensive territory, covering around half of the Iberian Peninsula, and Iberian soldiers later came to make up a large part of the army that his son Hannibal led into the Italian Peninsula to fight the Romans.

Before his death, Hamilcar Barca founded the city of Akra Leuke, and his son-in-law, Hasdrubal, continued his conquest further into Iberia, getting to the Tagus River by the time of his death in 221 BC.

Before the collapse of Carthaginian control of the Iberian peninsula, there were several cities founded in the region, including Qart-Hadasht, otherwise known as New Carthage. Soon after the Second Punic War, Gadir created a more friendly relationship with Rome.

== Fall of the Empire ==
The fall of Carthage's Iberian territories came in the Second Punic War. In the year 209 BC, after the Romans had landed on Iberia under the command of Scipio Africanus, they captured the centre of Punic power in Iberia, Nova Carthago (modern day Cartagena). They then moved south and faced the Punic army of Hasdrubal Barca in the Battle of Baecula but were not able to prevent him from continuing his march to Italy in order to reinforce his brother Hannibal. The catastrophic defeat of Carthaginian forces at Ilipa in 206 BC sealed the fate of the Carthaginian presence in Iberia. It was followed by the Roman capture of Gades after the city had already rebelled against Carthaginian rule. A last attempt was made by Mago in 205 BC to recapture Cartago Nova while the Roman presence was shaken by a mutiny and an Iberian uprising against their new overlords. But the attack was repulsed. So in the same year he left Iberia, setting sail from the Balearic islands to Italy with his remaining forces.

The end of the Carthaginian Empire came after the destruction of Carthage in 146 BC, which occurred at the end of the Third Punic War, the final conflict between Carthage and Rome. This took place about 50 years after the end of the Carthaginian presence in Iberia, and the entire empire came under Roman control.

== Art and artefacts of Phoenician influence in Iberia ==
Four Iberian "Ladies": Lady of Cerro de los Santos, Lady of Baza, Lady of Guardamar, and Lady of Elche, are dated around 4th century BC.

The Lady of Guardamar, found in 1987, is in the Museum of Alicante. When the Lady of Elche was found, it was thought to be of Hellenic influence, but since the discovery of the Lady of Guardamar in 1987, in the Phoenician (Carthaginian) site of Guardamar near Alicante (Lucentum), Phoenician would seem to be the appropriate designation.

This series of sculptures can be seen as types of funerary urns to hold ashes. There has been speculation that the Elche bust was originally full-length. Mythological animals of an earlier period – 6th–5th century BC: the Bull of Osuna, the Sphinx of Agost and the Bicha of Balazote, are in the National Archaeological Museum of Spain, in Madrid.

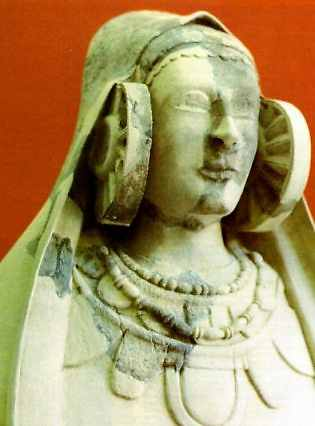
The Lady of Guardamar

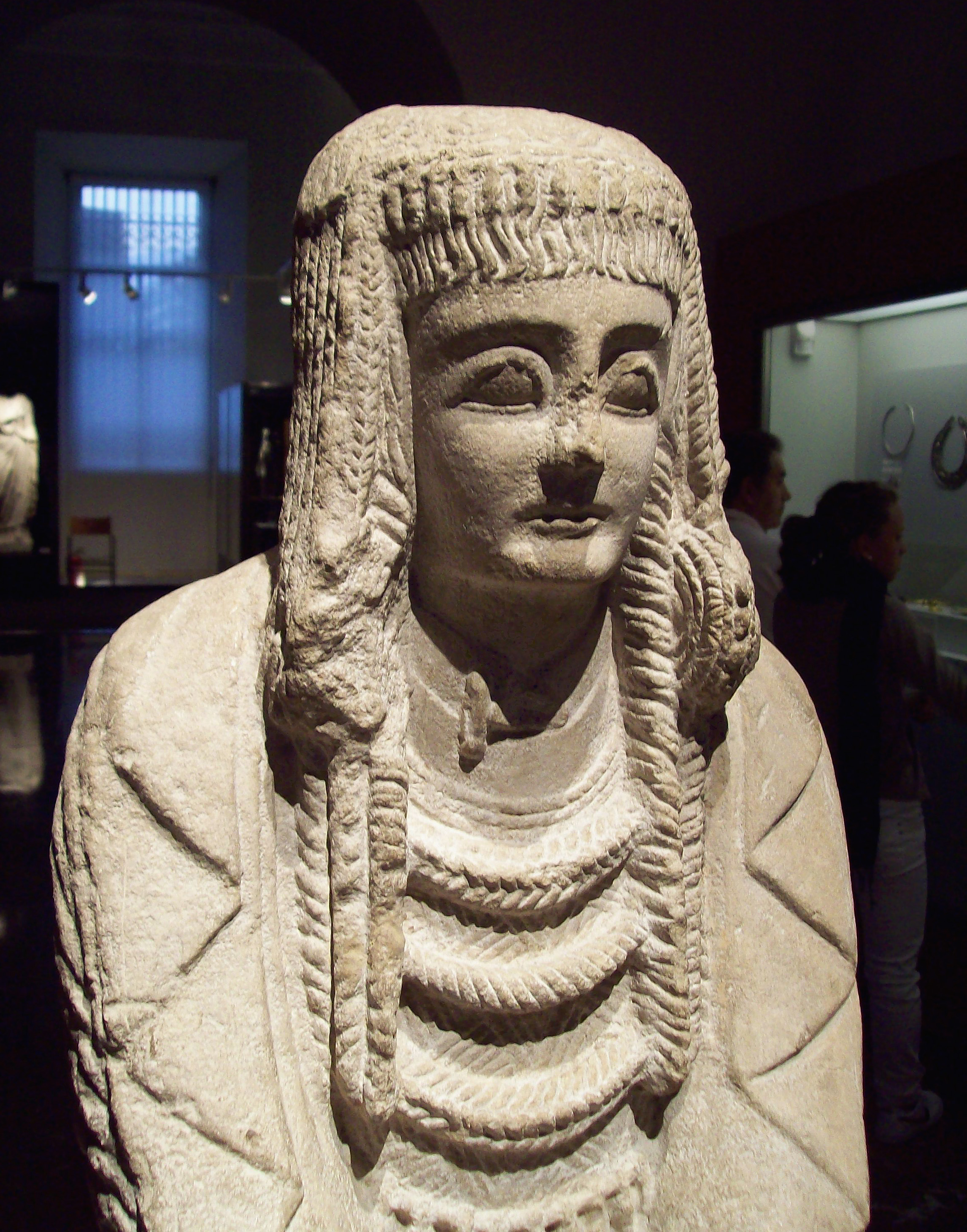
The Lady of Cerro de los Santos

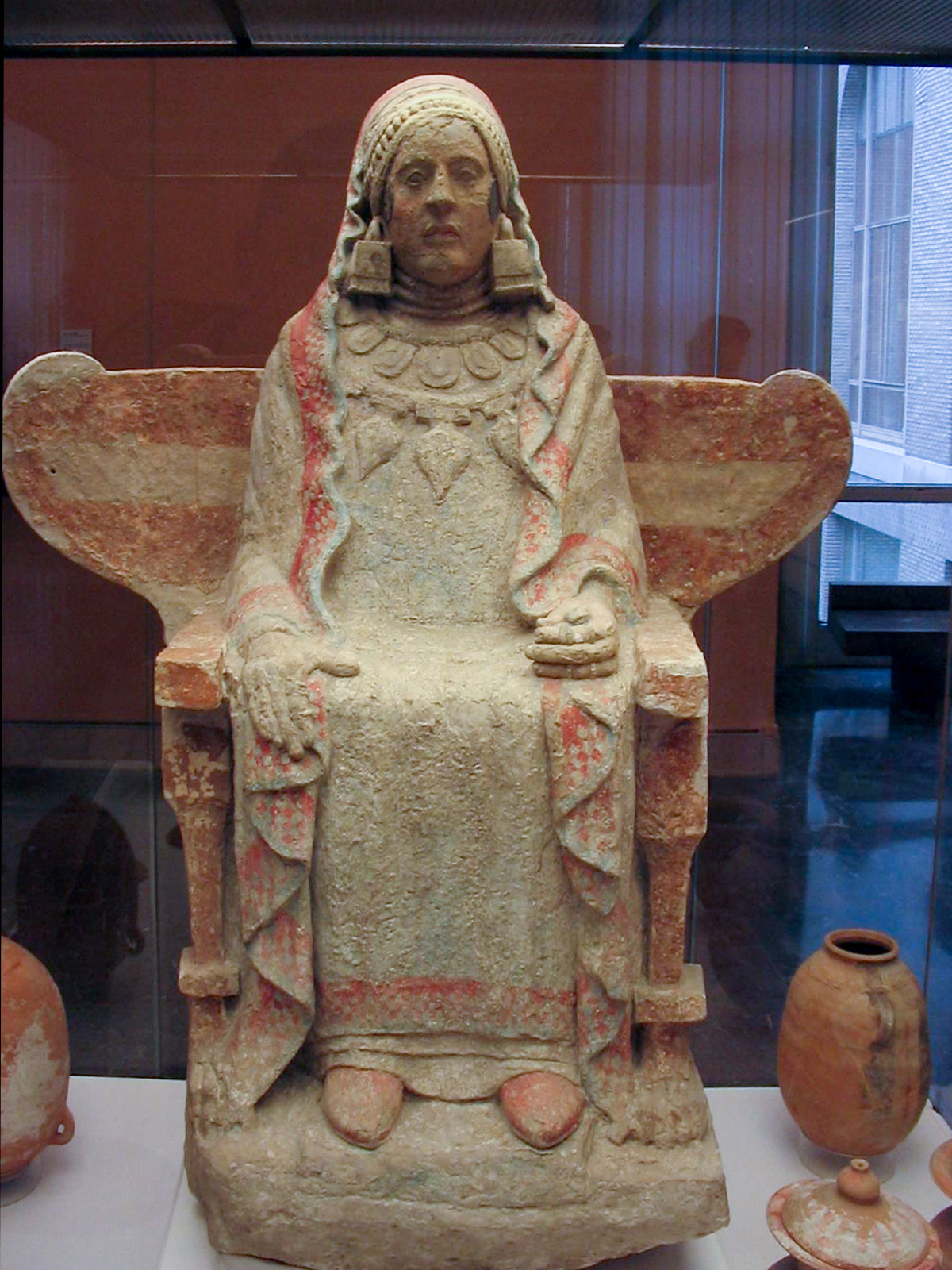
The Lady of Baza

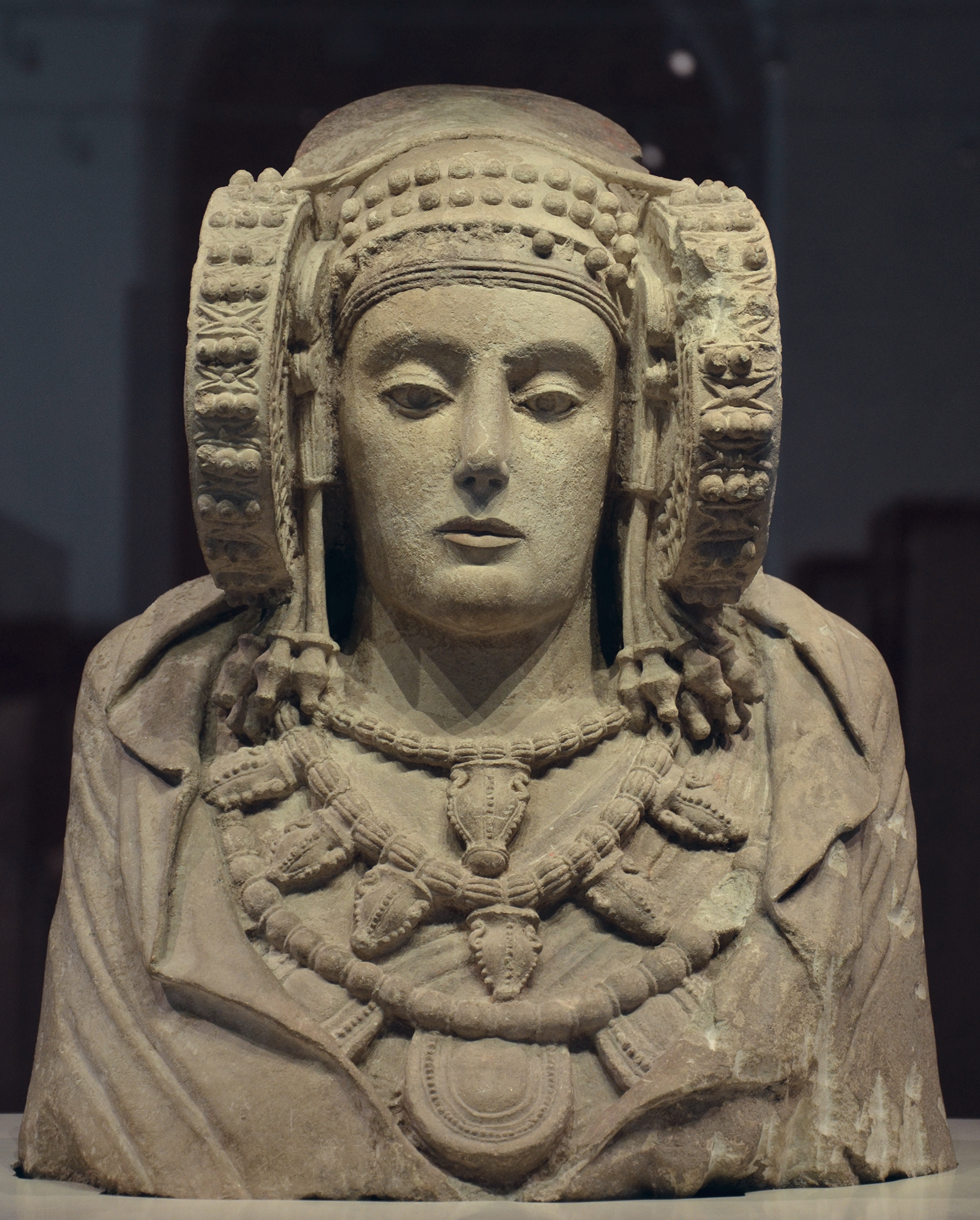
The Lady of Elche

== See also ==
- Carthaginian currency, including the Barcid mints in Iberia
- Timeline of Portuguese history
