= Lady of Baza =

4th-century BC Iberian sculpture

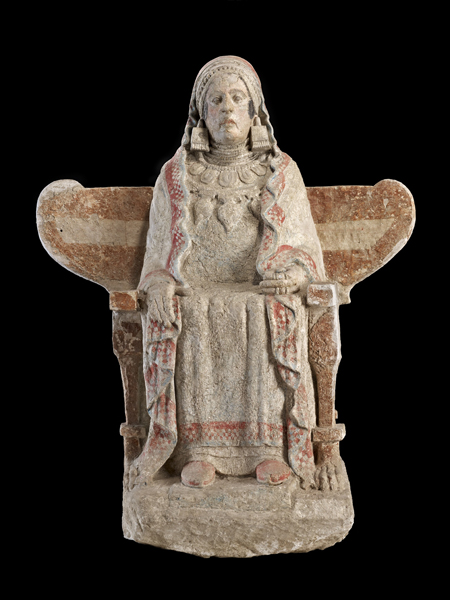
- The impassive seated female figure is richly dressed and adorned with ear ornaments
- Material: Limestone
- Height: 1.335 meters
- Width: 1.08 meters
- Created: 4th century BCE
- Discovered: 22 July 1971; Baza, Andalusia, Spain
- Discovered by: Francisco Velo
- Present location: Madrid, Community of Madrid, Spain

The Lady of Baza (la Dama de Baza) is a famous example of Iberian sculpture by the Bastetani. It is a limestone female figure with traces of painted detail in a stuccoed surface. It is held in Spain's National Archaeological Museum.

== Discovery ==
It was found on July 22, 1971, by Francisco José Presedo Velo, in Baza, in the Altiplano de Granada, a high tableland in the northeast of the province of Granada. The town of Baza was the site of the Ibero-Roman city of Basti, and the Lady of Baza was recovered from one of its two necropoleis, the Cerro del Santuario. She is seated in an armchair, and an open space on the side is thought to have held ashes from a cremation.

== Display ==
The sculpture's name links it in the popular imagination to its more famous cousin, the Lady of Elche. After conservation, the sculpture, which dates to the fourth century BCE, joined the enigmatic Lady of Elche deposited in the National Archaeological Museum of Spain in Madrid. The chimera Bicha of Balazote and the standing Gran Dama Oferente, also called Dama del Cerro de los Santos, are exhibited in the same room of the museum.
