= Montealegre del Castillo =

Coordinates: 38°47′N 1°19′W

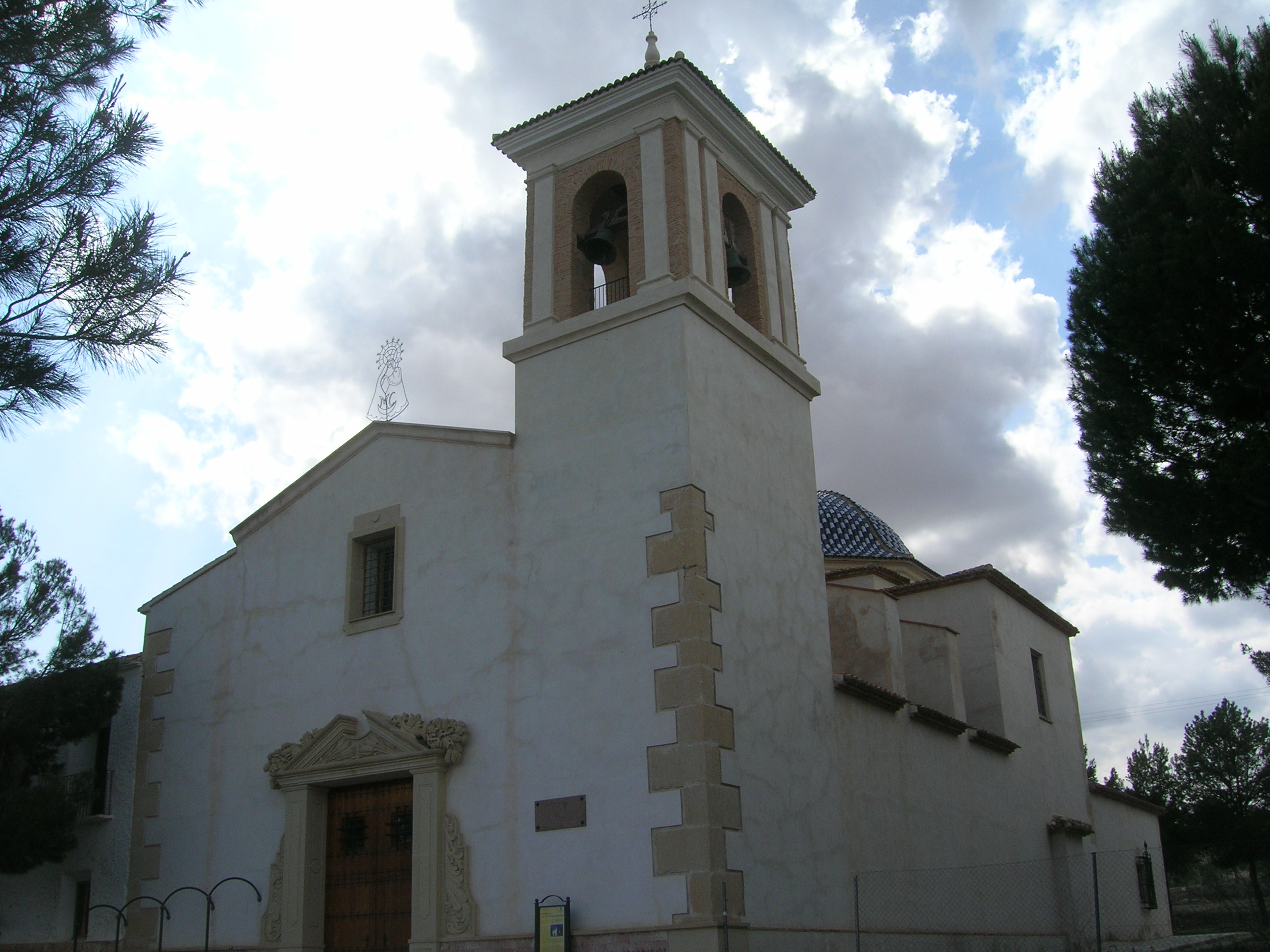
Sanctuary of Our Lady of Consolation, in Montealegre del Castillo, Albacete, Spain

Montealegre del Castillo, (named simply Montealegre before 1916), is a municipality in Albacete, Castile-La Mancha, Spain. It has a population of 2,040 as of 2023.
