= Sphinx of Agost =

6th-century BC Iberian sculpture

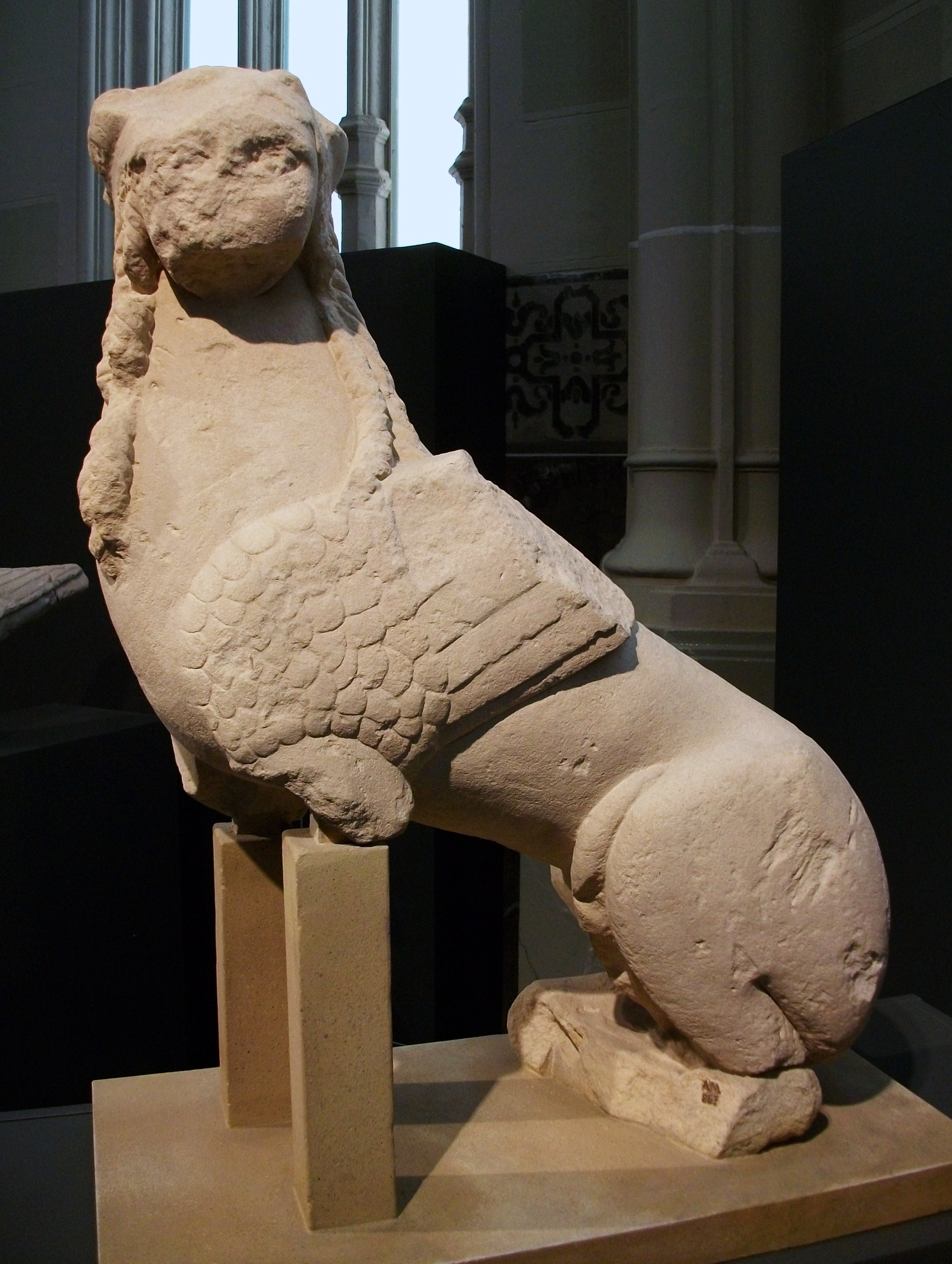
Sphinx of Agost

The Sphinx of Agost is a Greek-influenced Iberian limestone sculpture, dated from the late 6th-century BCE, that was found in the Agost reservoir in Alicante, Spain, in 1893.

The badly damaged statue is 82 cm high and represents a sphinx with the head of a woman, body of a winged lion and tail of a snake. This particular sphinx may have been included in an Iberian tomb to carry the soul of the deceased to the afterlife.

The Sphinx of Agost is on display at the National Archaeological Museum (Madrid).

== See also ==
- Sphinx of Haches
- Sphinxes of El Salobral
- Bicha of Balazote
- Iberian sculpture
