= Iberian sculpture =

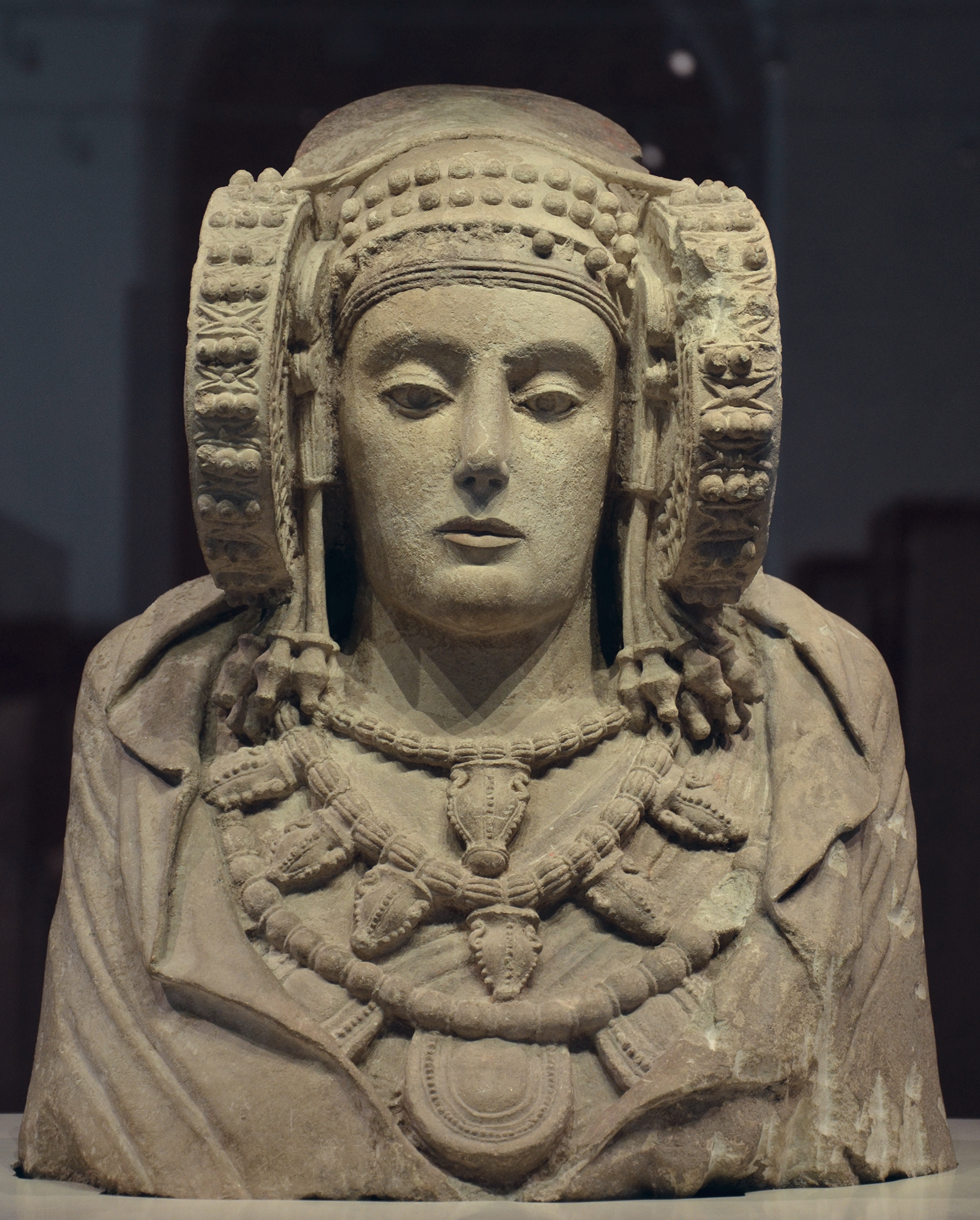
The Lady of Elche

Iberian sculpture, a subset of Iberian art, describes the various sculptural styles developed by the Iberians from the Bronze Age up to the Roman conquest. For this reason it is sometimes described as Pre-Roman Iberian sculpture.

Almost all extant works of Iberian sculpture visibly reflect Greek and Phoenician influences, and Assyrian, Hittite and Egyptian influences from which those derived (especially the Phoenician one); yet they have their own unique character. Within this complex stylistic heritage, individual works can be placed within a spectrum of influences- some of more obvious Phoenician derivation, and some so similar to Greek works that they could have been directly imported from that region. Overall the degree of influence is correlated to the work's region of origin, and hence they are classified into groups on that basis.

== The Levantine Group ==
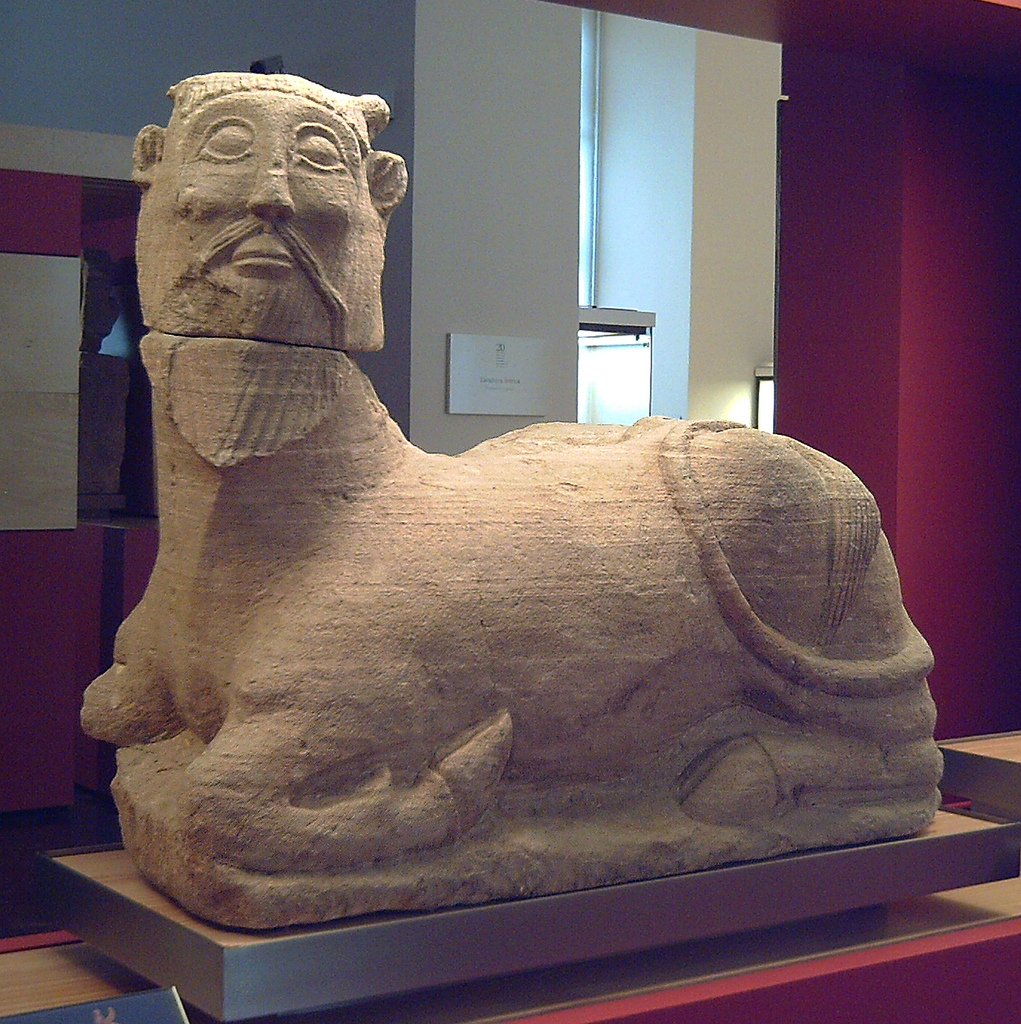
The Bicha of Balazote

The sculptures that comprise the Levantine group were mostly made between the 5th century B.C. and the period of Roman domination; this group is best represented in museum collections. The most famous among them is the bust known as The Lady of Elche, which displays evident Greek influence. Works in this style number over 670; though there are stylistic differences, which testify to the successive influences of conquering peoples.

More visibly oriental references, possibly influenced by the Egyptian sphinx and the Assyrian Lamassu, are evident in the various stone sculptures in the form of sphinxes, bulls, or lions found in the area of Valencia, Alicante, and Albacete. They include:

- The Bicha of Balazote, or the man-bull
- The Sphinx of Agost, in Alicante, and that of Salobral (Albacete), which guards the Louvre Museum, though mutilated.
- The Lioness of Bocairent (Valencia), in the Provincial Museum of Valencia
- The Lioness of El Zaricejo, in Villena (Alicante)
- The Lion of Coy in Murcia
- The Lions of Baena (Córdoba), which are similar to the previous ones
- The Deer of Caudete (Albacete) or the Lady of Caudete

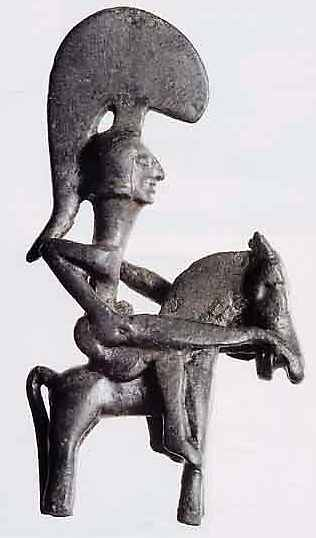
The Warrior of Mogente

The numerous statues of bronze (some of silver) found in two places of the region of Sierra Morena in the province of Jaén can be considered to be more indigenous derivatives of the initial, Greek and oriental- influenced, Levantine sculptural style.

In the period between the 5th century BC and the 5th century AD, sanctuaries like Montealegre used small bronze castings, rather than stone carvings, as votive offerings. These sculptures were cast from earthen molds in molten bronze in the technique of lost wax casting, but since the mold was rendered useless after only one casting, two identical works have yet to be found amongst these sculptures. Approximately 4,000 sculptures in this style have been excavated, depicting Iberian warriors, riders, religious celebrants, small horses, and body parts.

A great deal of Greek and Punic statues and busts in Terra cotta, together with various amulets in ivory, metal or carved of thin stone, have been uncovered at the necropolis of Ibiza, La Palma, and Formentera. The oldest have been dated to the 8th century B.C., and they most likely continued to be made up to the Roman domination. These include:

- The Lady of Ibiza
- Praying Terracotta Figurines (3rd century BC)

Pieces also considered to be of Phoenician or Punic origin but with Greek influence include the bronze heads of bulls (probably votive offerings) found in Mallorca.

A very early Phoenician piece from Galera, Granada depicts a seated female, perhaps the Near Eastern goddess Astarte, flanked by sphinxes. Known as the Lady of Galera, it is an alabaster female figurine, made in the 7th century BC, and is at the National Archaeological Museum of Spain, in Madrid.

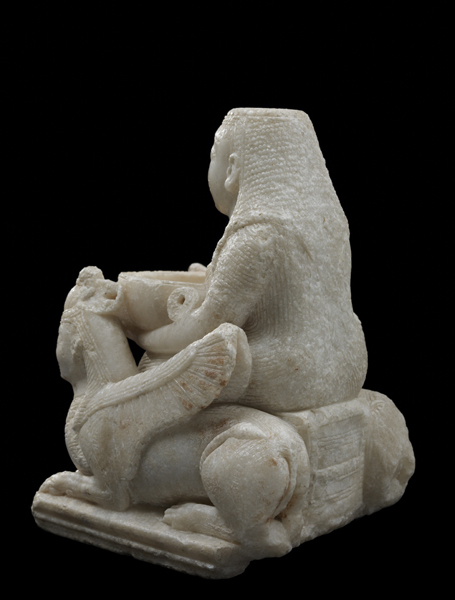

In 2023, two female stone busts were discovered at the Turuñuelo archeological site in Guareña, Spain, that are somewhat similar to the Lady of Elche, but are about a century earlier, dating to the 5th century BC. They were found in the context of the Tartessos culture. The busts feature details of jewelry and hairstyles, and are thought to be the first facial representations of Tartessian goddesses.

== The Southern Group ==
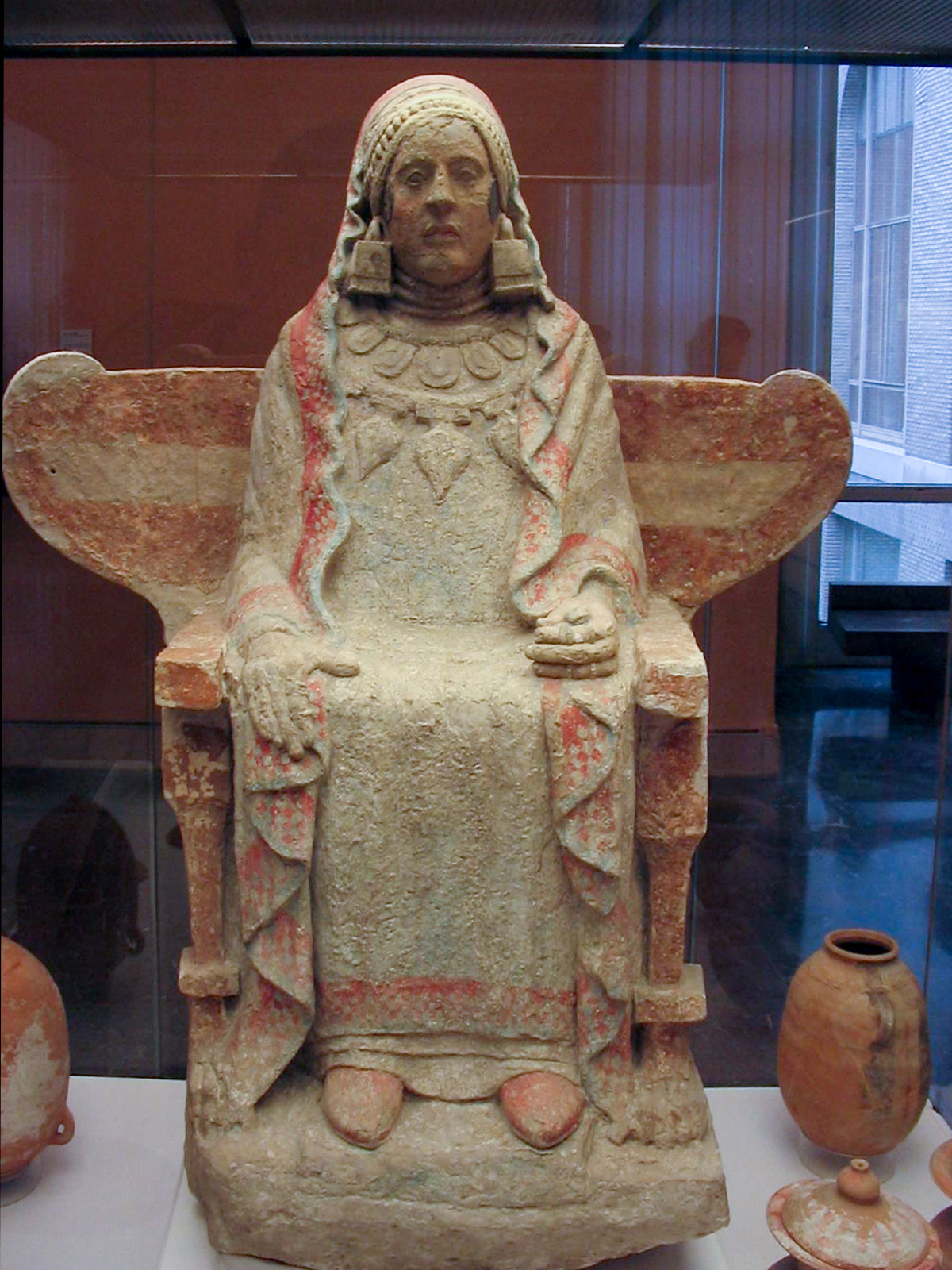
The Lady of Baza

The southern group is principally composed of sculptures found in sepulchers, and other funeral monuments, in the Andalusian region. Most of them display heavy Phoenician influence. They are as follows:

- The sculptural set of Cerrillo Blanco
- the sculptural set of The Pajarillo
- The Punic stela of Villaricos (Almeria), of conical form and with Phoenician inscription
- The Lady of Baza.
- The plates and combs of ivory with reliefs of Carmona's necropolis.
- The anthropomorphic sarcophagus carved in marble with the figure of the deceased, of the Greek style, found in Cadiz
- The amulets with figurines of Egyptian style found in sepulchers of Cadiz and Málaga
- several other reliefs of the Phoenician or Iberian tradition but worked already with Roman influence, discovered in Osuna (such as the Bull of Osuna)

== The Western Group ==
The western group is composed of granite funeral stelae from Portugal and Galicia that represent foot soldiers dressed in tunics and armed with round shields. These sculptures are relatively coarsely worked. Some of them bear Roman inscriptions, which were probably added long after the figures were carved.

== The Central Group ==
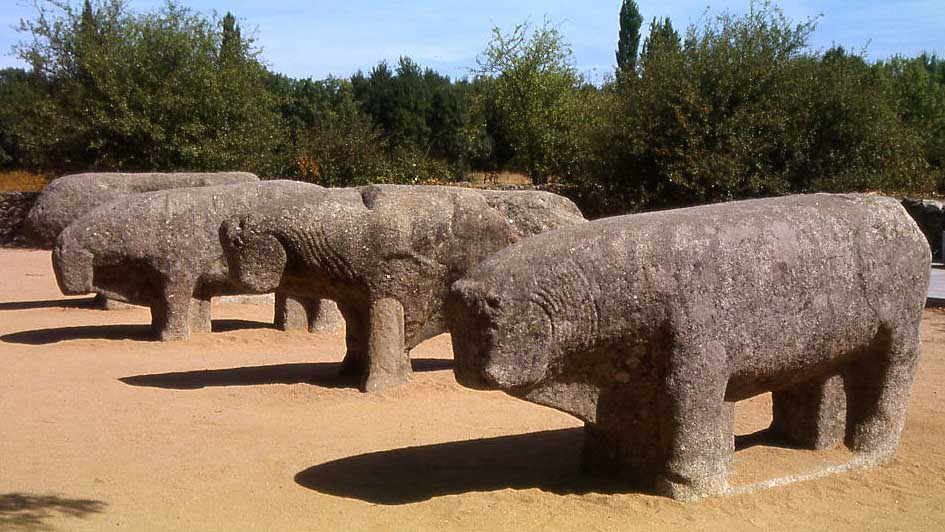
The Bulls of Guisando

In the center of the Peninsula, between the rivers Douro and Tagus there are many granite sculptures roughly carved in the form of bulls, or perhaps some other animal. Some of these also have Roman inscriptions, which again were probably added later. The most famous of these monuments are the four known as the Bulls of Guisando. Archeologists consider them to be works of the same culture that carved the sphinxes of the Levantine region.

== See also ==
- South-Western Iberian Bronze
- Iberian schematic art
- Sphinx of Haches
- Torito of Porcuna
