= Comarca de Huéscar =

- Comarca
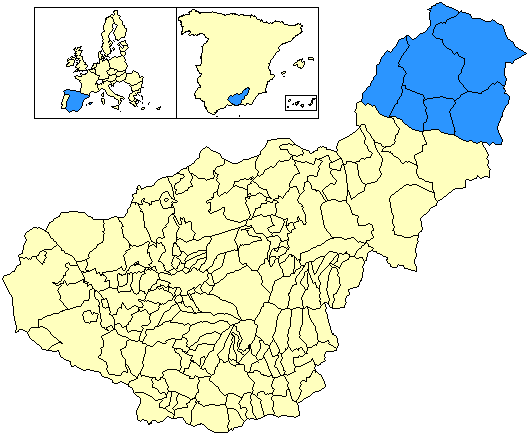
- Location of Comarca de Huéscar in the province of Granada, Andalusia, Spain
- Coordinates: 37°45′25″N 2°35′54″W
- Country: Spain
- Autonomous community: Andalusia
- Province: Granada

Area
  - Total: 1,814 km^{2} (700 sq mi)

Population (2024) (Note: Estimate at 1 January 2024: National Statistics Institute (Spain))
  - Total: 14,957
  - Density: 8.245/km^{2} (21.36/sq mi)

Comarca de Huéscar is a comarca in the province of Granada, Spain. This comarca was established in 2003 by the Government of Andalusia.

== Municipalities ==
It contains the following municipalities:

Arms	Municipality	Area (km^{2})	Population (2024) (Note: Estimate at 1 January 2024: National Statistics Institute (Spain))	Density (/km^{2})
	Castilléjar	131.2	1,289	9.8
	Castril	243.3	1,968	8.1
	Galera	117.9	1,116	9.5
	Huéscar	473.1	7,234	15.3
	Orce	324.7	1,148	3.5
	Puebla de Don Fadrique	523.4	2,202	4.2
	Total	1,813.6	14,957	8.2
