= Castellón Alto =

Coordinates: 37.7400°N 2.5659°W

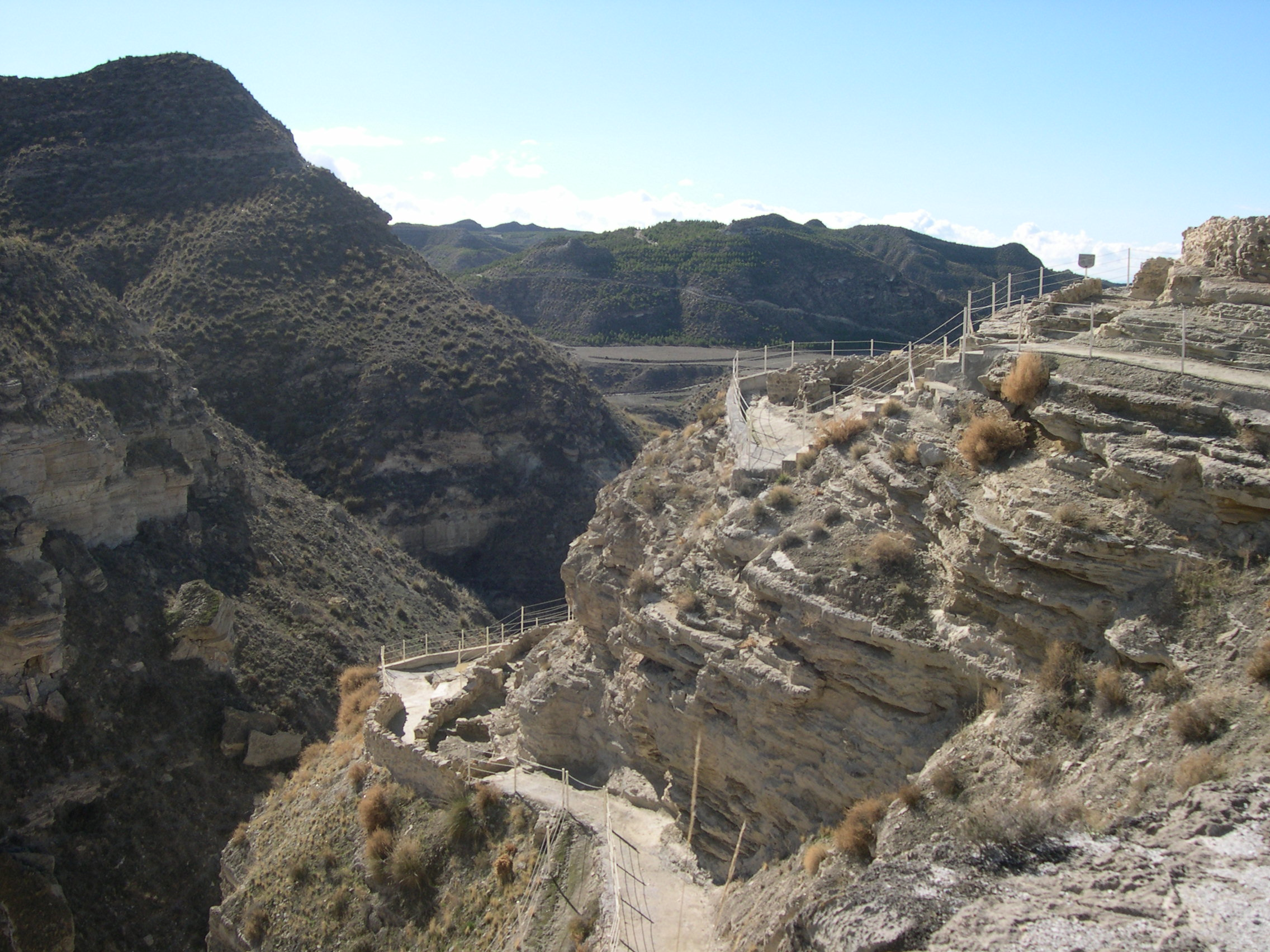
- Archaeological site of Castellón Alto
- Location: Galera, Granada

Castellón Alto is an Argaric culture archaeological site located in Galera, Granada and dated between 1900 and 1600 BE during the Bronze Age.

The inhabited area was located on three natural terraces and the hillside. The upper terrace is separated from the rest of the town by a perimeter wall, forming an acropolis area where the elites of the town lived with fundamental elements for survival such as the cistern or a water tank. It is noteworthy the 130 graves, which except for children's burials in an urn, are found in artificial covachas (caves carved from the rock, mostly sealed by large slabs).

It was excavated from June to July 1983 and from September to November by the University of Granada.

== Access ==
Guided visits are available to this site and the necropolis of Tútugi, which is also located in Galera. There is a small museum in the centre of the village which displays some prehistoric material including the "Galera mummy" found at Castellón Alto.
