= María José Moreno =

Spanish light lyric soprano (born 1967)

- Born: 30 March 1967 (age 57); Castilléjar, Spain
- Occupation: Soprano singer
- Spouse: Massimo Spadano
- Awards: Grammy Award (2006)
- Musical career
- Genres: Opera
- Website: www.mariajosemoreno.com

María José Moreno (born 30 March 1967) is a Spanish light lyric soprano.

== Biography ==
Born in Castilléjar, Granada, María José Moreno studied at the Escuela Superior de Canto in Madrid.

In 1996 she debuted in Pamplona with the character of Dido in the opera Dido and Aeneas by Henry Purcell with the group Vaghi Concerti, a production with which she would travel through several Spanish cities.

In 1997 Moreno made her great breakthrough, winning the Francisco Viñas Award in January and making her debut at the Teatro de la Zarzuela with Donizetti's La fille du régiment. A year later, she debuted at Madrid's Teatro Real (in its first season after reopening) with the Verdi opera Un ballo in maschera.

Her successes in Spain allowed her to make an international leap, performing at such important venues as La Scala in Milan (playing Gilda in Rigoletto) and the Vienna State Opera (as Rosina in Rossini's The Barber of Seville). She has participated in the Festival de Pésaro numerous times, debuting in 2009.

She won a Grammy Award for the recording of the opera Falstaff with the London Symphony Orchestra conducted by Sir Colin Davis in 2006.

María José Moreno is a bel canto specialist, with a predilection for Rossini and Donizetti, but also Wolfgang Amadeus Mozart. In addition, she frequently performs zarzuelas.

She is married to Massimo Spadano, an Italian violinist and conductor who since 1994 has been the concertmaster of the Orquesta Sinfónica de Galicia (OSG) of A Coruña. The couple lives in Oleiros and has two children who speak Spanish and Italian.
