= La Bastida de les Alcusses =

4th century BCE city in modern-day Valencia

Coordinates: 38.8148°N 0.8005°W

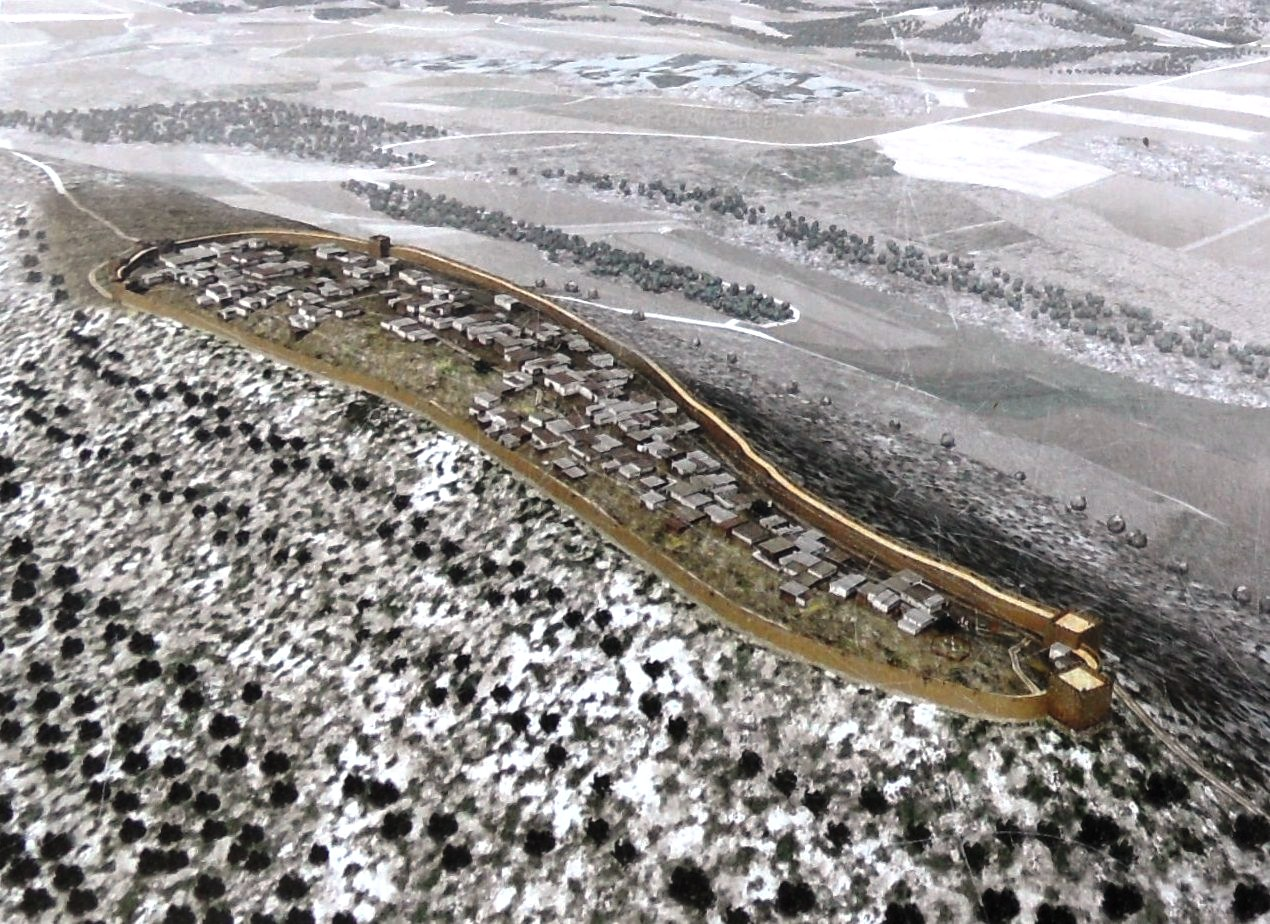
Digital reconstruction of the site

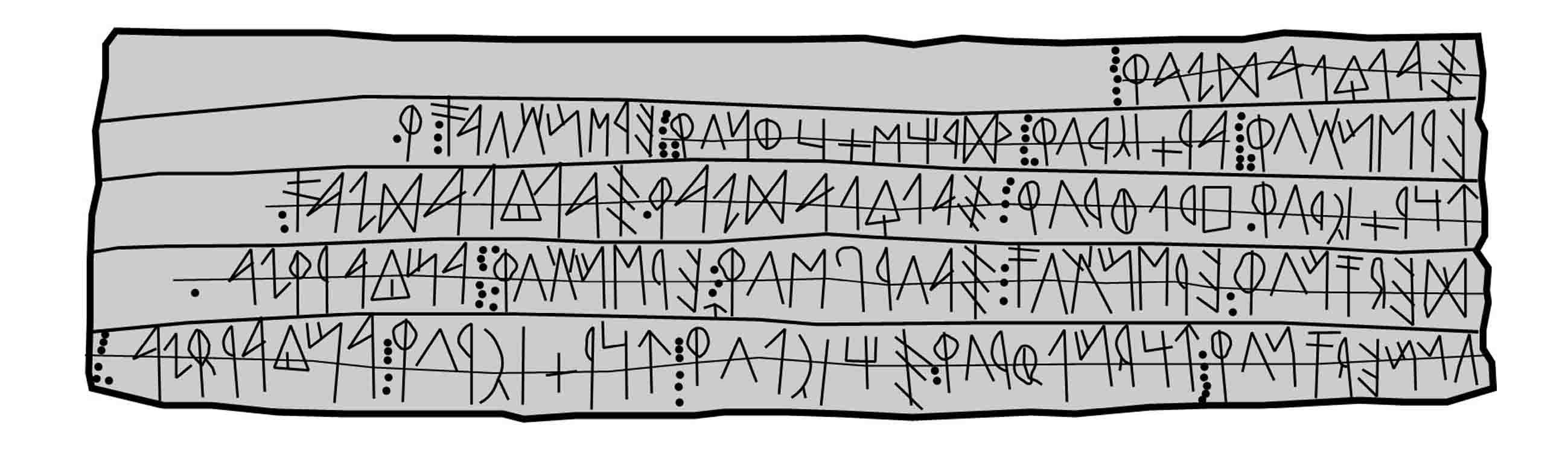
Face A of a lead plaque inscribed in Iberian found at the site.

La Bastida de les Alcusses is an Iberian city of the 4th century BC located near Mogente/Moixent, Valencia. It is considered to be one of the principal Iberian archaeological sites of the Valencian Community due to its sudden abandonment and good preservation. The site is located 741 metres above sea level (and 200 metres above the valley floor) at the southwest end of the Serra Grossa. The site covers over 4 hectares and is 650 metres long and 150 metres wide. The site is now an archaeological park, surrounded by pine forest and bush but accessible by road.

== History of investigation ==
The site was first described in 1909 by Luis Tortosa. The first archaeological excavations were begun in 1928 by the newly created Servicio de Investigación Prehistórica of the Valencian Community. Four campaigns were carried out between 1928 and 1931.

250 rooms were excavated and a number of important artefacts were recovered, including the Guerrero de Mogente, small lead plaques with inscriptions in the Southeast variant of Iberian, and weapons and jewellery. In newspapers of the time, the site was described as a "new Pompeii".

Further excavations have been carried out in the 1990s and this century.

== Fortifications ==
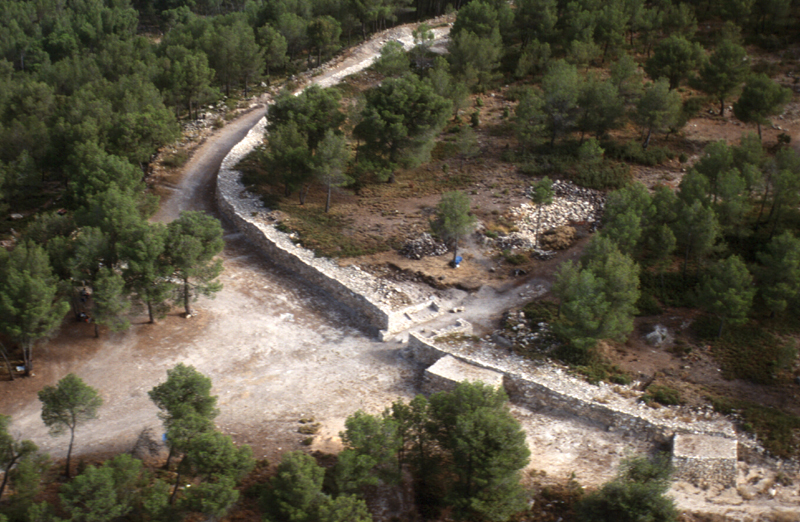
Wall and west (main) gate (Bastida de les Alcusses)

The site is walled, with walls more than 3 metres thick at the most vulnerable points. Four gates give access to the interior of the site, three at the western end and one at the eastern. Two towers extrude from the wall at the western end, where the main gate is located. The gatehouses all contain internal benches, possibly guard posts or spaces for controlling the passage of goods. The gates themselves were wooded, reinforced with iron bands. The stone lower half of the gates and walls is still in existence while the upper half, which would have been built from adobe bricks and included a walkway, is lost. At the western end, an additional external area may also have been more weakly fortified, perhaps as a refuge for people in the surrounding area. The secondary gates at the western end were blocked up during the occupation of the site, presumably to improve defensibility.

== Urban layout and domestic architecture ==
The buildings are organised around a central street that runs from east to west through the middle of the town. Secondary streets run perpendicular to this main street and some open plazas were left without buildings. A communal granary is found in the centre of the site.

The houses are of different sizes, ranging from 20 to 150 metres squared. The houses have the same building technique as the walls, with adobe bricks above a stone base. The walls would have then been whitewashed and sometimes even painted. The houses are of a single floor but the flat roof (at a slight angle) was accessible and may have been used for some activities.

There may have been around ninety to one hundred and twenty houses over the whole site, housing a population of 450 to 840 persons.

The central part of each house was a hearth, the meeting point and symbol of family life. A storage room at the back was used to keep foodstuffs and tools. Further spaces housed milling equipment and more specialised activities such as metallurgy, weaving and other artisanal activities.

== Everyday life: agriculture and trade ==
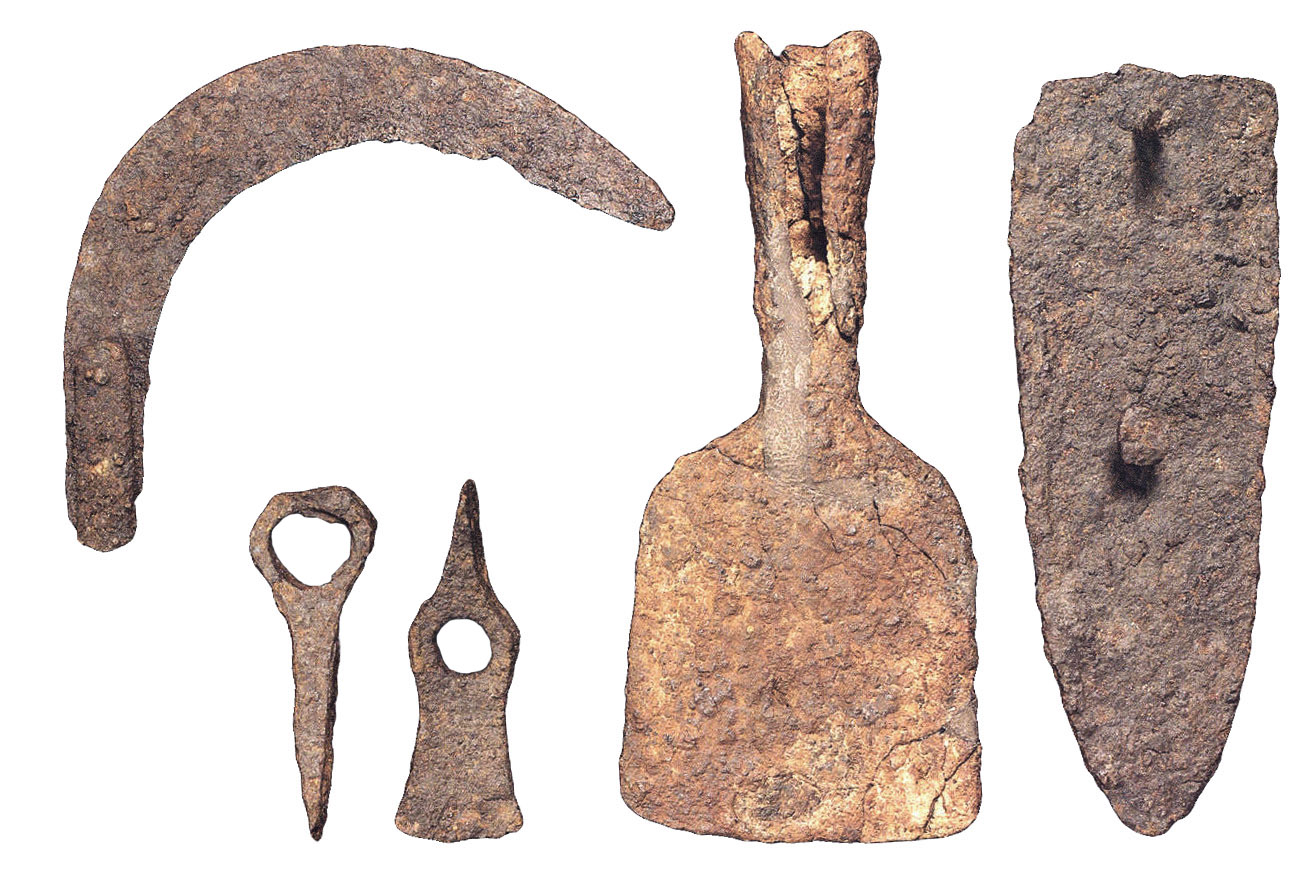
Agricultural tools recovered at the site

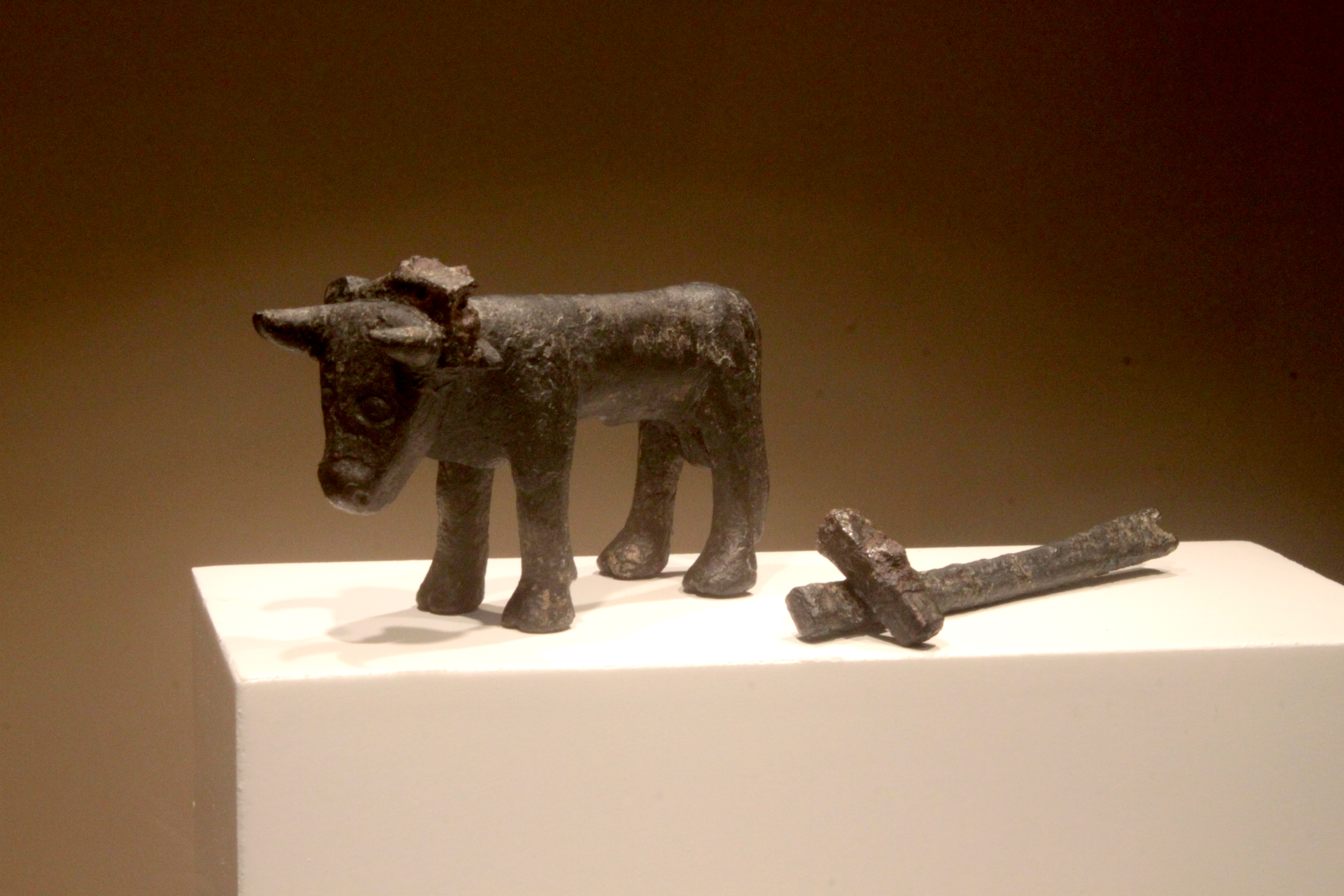
Bronze votive figure of ox with plough (Bastida de les Alcusses)

Agricultural and pastoral tasks were a fundamental part of everyday subsistence. The principal crops were unirrigated cereals (barley, wheat and millet) as well as legumes (broad beans and peas). Fruits and nuts were also important, especially olives, vines, almonds and figs.

Cultivation was done with wooden ploughs reinforced with iron ploughshares, of which a number have been found in the houses of the town. Other agricultural tools found at the site include billhooks, sickles, hoes and rakes, forming one of the most complete tool assemblages known for pre-Roman agriculture in Spain.

The most common livestock were sheep and goats, with some bovines and pigs. These animals were used for milk, wool, leather and meat, and were also necessary for ploughing and to pull carts. Some wild species were also hunted, included rabbits, hares, deer, mountain goats and wild boar. Finally, fish hooks found at the site indicate that the nearby Canyoles river was also an important food source.

Trade and commercial activities were also an important part of the economic life of the town. Weights and balances have been found, doubtless used in commercial transactions and perhaps related to the small silver and bronze ingots also found at the site. The silver was obtained through the cupellation of lead, carried out in some houses.

One of the inscribed lead plaques found on the site is inscribed with a list of names, with different quantities written beside each name and many of the names crossed out. This plaque is generally interpreted as a form of account or receipt. The plaque is 180 by 40 millimetres and 1 millimetre thick and was found in the excavations of 1928, rolled up and placed under a grinding stone in department 48.

Various objects found in the excavations also point to connections across the Mediterranean. From the Strait of Gibraltar there are amphoras that contained salted fish products and included amongst the local tablewares are plates and cups imported from Athens. Some of these imported pieces were imitated by Iberian potters.

== Social structure ==
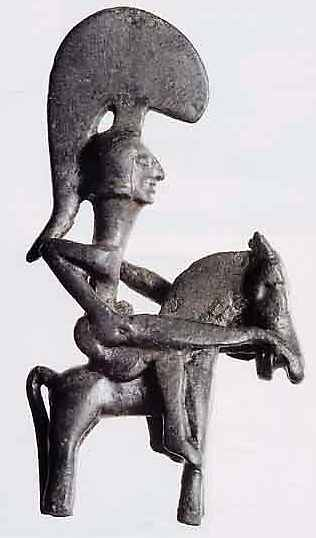
The Guerrero de Mogente (7.3 cm), a bronze votive discovered in 1931 by Vicente Espí while working in Department 218. (Bastida de les Alcusses)

The inhabitants of la Bastida lived in a stratified society. Status and wealth are shown in jewellery, house size and imported goods. The Guerrero de Mogente likely represents a high status man: the figure is represented as naked to show his heroic nature, and carries the distinctive Iberian curved sword (falcata), a small round shield (caetra), and wears a helmet with a large plume. The offerings deposited in the principal (west) gate, also indicate the symbolic importance of a full panoply including sword and shield. The association of swords with ploughs may also indicate that such figures also controlled good agricultural lands. High status women may have been signalled through fine clothing and are associated with loom weights.

== Destruction and abandonment ==
The settlement was occupied for only a short time before being destroyed around 330 BC. As such, it was probably only inhabited for three or four generations. The blockage of two of the gates, remains of a fire, and the numerous weapons and personal items found in the streets all indicate a rapid and violent end to the site's occupation. The context of the sack of La Bastida is unclear but most likely relates to conflicts between different Iberian groups, although whether all the combatants were from the local area or groups from further afield were involved is unknown. Competition between the many sites in the area for control of the important transport route from the coast into the southern Meseta, or control of arable land in the Canyoles valley may have been motivating factors.

== Visiting times ==
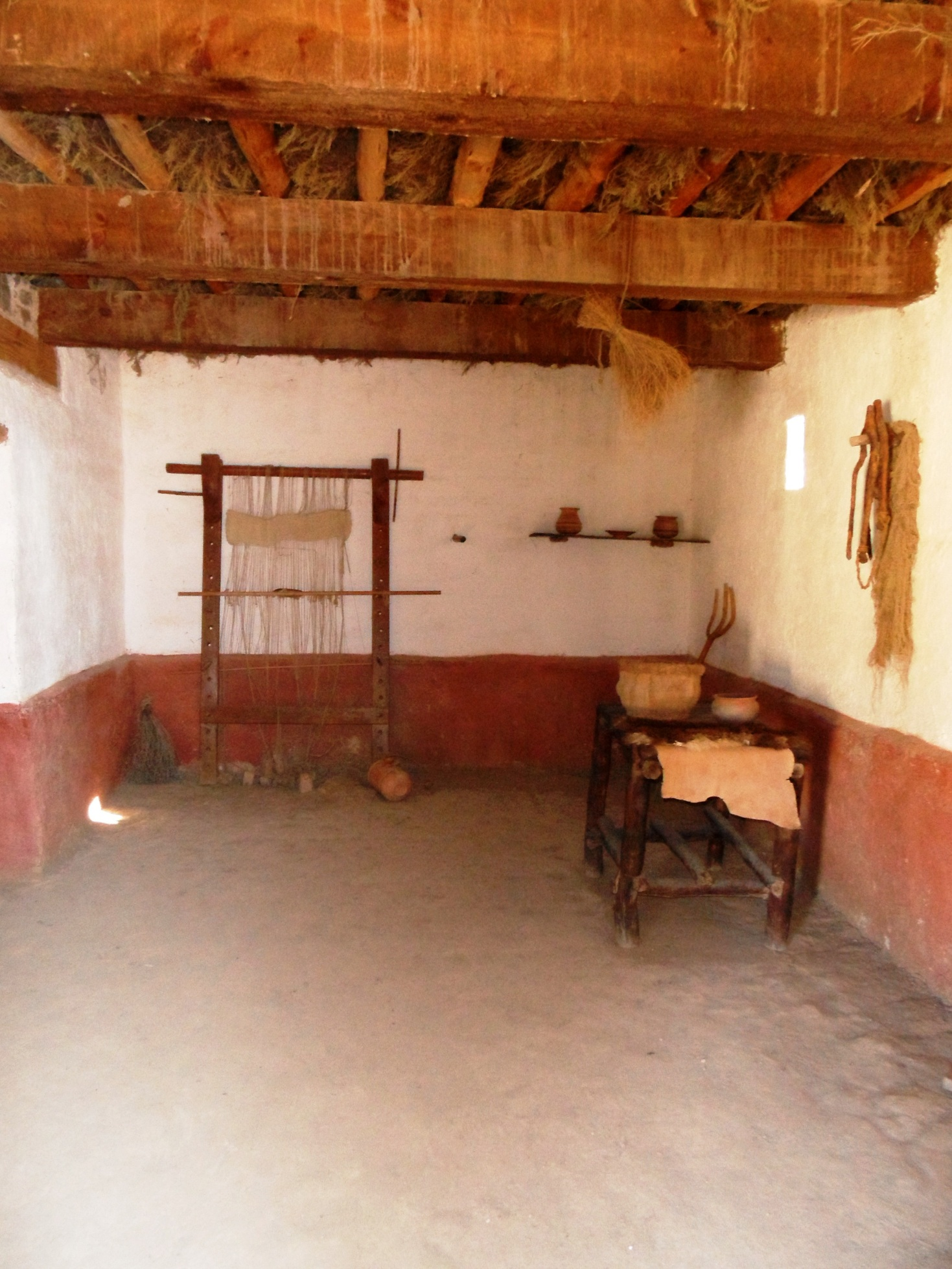
Reconstruction of the main room of an Iberian house (Bastida de les Alcusses)

The Museum of Mogente/Moixent and the site of La Bastida may be visited all year round. Entry to the site is free. The site is open from 10am to 2pm and from 4pm to 6pm (winter months) or from 4pm to 8pm (summer months), Tuesday to Sunday.

The site has a guide service as well as information panels for self-guided visits. Immediately outside the site, a full-scale replica of an Iberian house has been reconstructed using the appropriate materials and techniques. In addition, many of the items recovered from La Bastida can be seen at the Valencian Museum of Prehistory.
