= Battle of Castril =

Battle of Castril (1438)
- Part of the Spanish Reconquista
Date	28 July 1438
Location	Castril
Result	Granadan victory

Belligerents
Crown of Castile	Emirate of Granada

Commanders and leaders
Rodrigo de Perea †	Arraez Aben Cerrax †

Strength
1,300 men	4,000 men or 2,000 cavalry 12,000 infantry

Casualties and losses
All but 15 or 20 killed	Unknown

The battle of Castril was a military engagement between the Granadans and the Castilians who aimed to attack the city of Baza. Both sides met near Castril, and the Granadans achieved a victory.

== Background ==
When the Granada Sultan Muhammad IX was unable to defend his subjects from Castilian attacks, the Islamic cities submitted to Castile, marking a significant qualitative shift in the dynamic of border warfare and conquests that began in 1436. The eastern region of al-Andalus was home to these cities: Vélez Blanco, Vélez Rubio, Galera, Castilléjar, Benamaurel, and Benzalema. By giving up early to the Castilian advance, they were able to escape a futile and agonizing resistance and receive favorable terms in return for their vassalage. In April 1438, Huelma, the most significant bastion in the center section of the northern boundary, was lost, dealing another significant setback.

== Battle ==
After this success at Huelma, the Castilians marched to Baza. The Castilians were led by Adelantado of Cazorla, Rodrigo de Perea, with a force of 300 knights and 1,000 infantry. The Granadans were alerted by the upcoming invasion and set out to meet them. The Granadans were led by a famous knight called Arraez Aben Cerrax of Abencerrages. The Granadans had a force of 4,000 crossbowmen and horsemen, or 2,000 horsemen and 12,000 foot soldiers. The Granadans marched out and met the Castilians at the fields of Castril, towards a place called Los Tubos..

Arraez sent a provocation to the Castilians. No sooner after that, the Granandans charged fiercely at the enemy. The Adelantado fell dead at the hands of a Moorish knight, who drove his sharp lance deep into his guts. Although the Christians showed prodigies of valor, they could not withstand the effort of the Granadans; almost all covered the field with their corpses. Arraez displayed great valor during the battle until, wounded by a thrust and an arrow, he bled to death on the field and was carried to his tent on the shoulders of the soldiers and died shortly after. His death was mourned by the Granadans.

The Castilian force was wiped out; only fifteen or twenty survived the battle and escaped. The battle happened on 28 July 1438.

== Sources ==
- Miguel Lafuente y Alcántara (1904), Historia de Granada, comprendiendo las de sus cuatro provincias Almería, Jaén, Granada y Málaga, desde remotos tiempos hasta nuestros días, Vol I.
- Gonzalo Argote de Molina (1866), Nobleza de Andalucia, que dedicó al rey don Felipe II Gonzalo Argote de Molina.
