= Balazote =

- Municipality
- Coat of arms

- Location within Province of Albacete Location within Castilla-La Mancha Location within Spain
- Coordinates: 38°53′N 2°8′W
- Country: Spain
- Autonomous Community: Castile-La Mancha
- Province: Albacete

Area
  - Total: 65.15 km^{2} (25.15 sq mi)

Population (2025-01-01)
  - Total: 2,356
  - Density: 36.16/km^{2} (93.66/sq mi)
- Demonym: Balazoteños
- Time zone: UTC+1 (CET)
  - Summer (DST): UTC+2 (CEST)

Balazote is a municipality in Albacete, Castile-La Mancha, Spain. It has a population of 2,412.

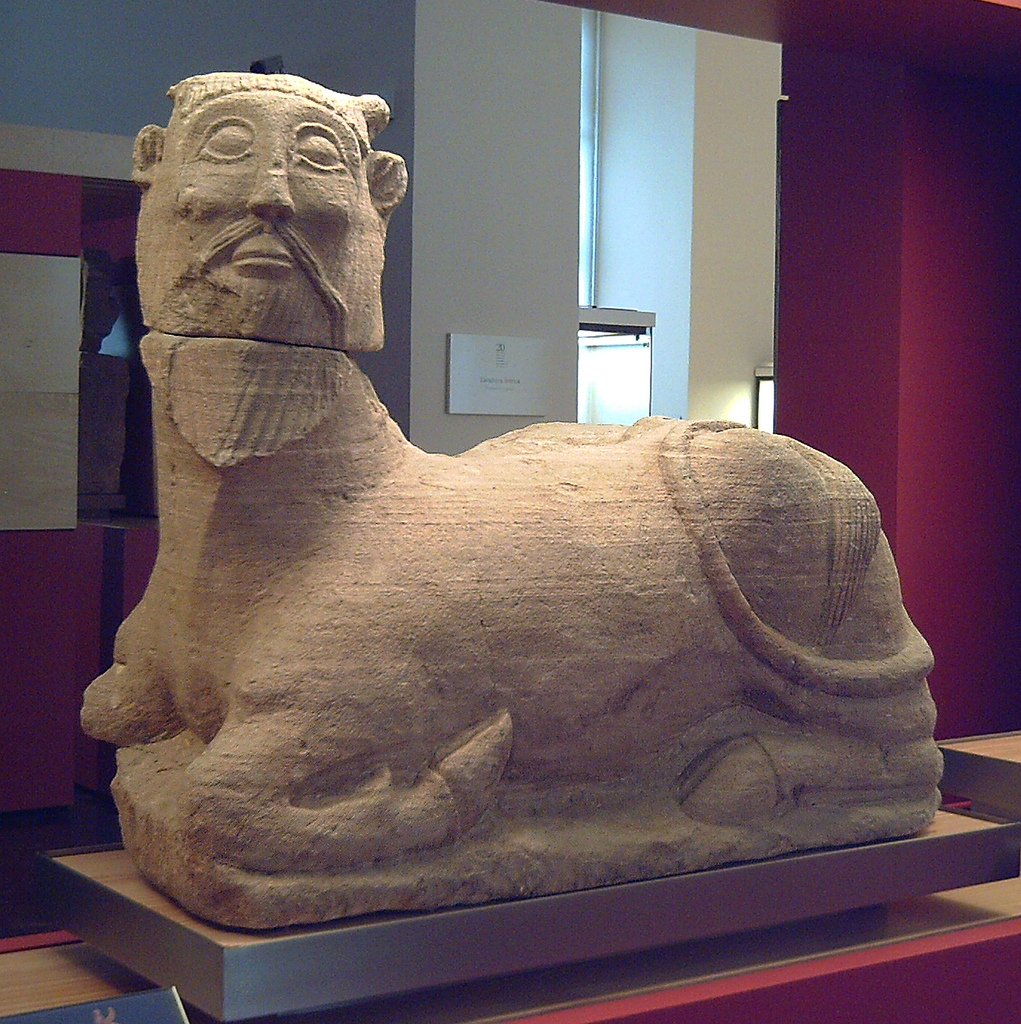
The ancient Iberian Bicha of Balazote, now in the National Archaeological Museum of Spain, Madrid

== See also ==
- Bicha of Balazote
- Oretani
