= Juan del Valle y Caviedes =

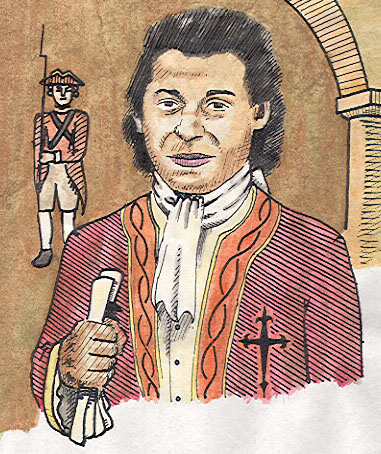

Juan del Valle y Caviedes (11 April 1645 – 1698), often referenced as Caviedes, was a Colonial poet from Viceregal Peru. He belongs chronologically to the Spanish American Baroque Colonial period, and shares much with Baroque writers such as Mateo Rosas de Oquendo, Sor Juana and Bernardo de Balbuena. He was a social and political critic, pointing out the shortcomings and hypocrisies of the Spanish American colonial administrators.

Caviedes was born in Porcuna, Andalusia, Spain in 1645. He moved to Peru at an early age and settled in Lima, later spending some time in the mining area of Huancavelica, where life was hard even for a Spaniard at the top of the social pyramid. As has been shown by various critics, a false biography based on the author's satirical works suggested that he dissipated his fortune on gambling, drink, and women of dubious morals and that as a result of having contracted a venereal disease he directed his satirical bite at the damage done by physicians and their indifferent and rapacious attitude toward their patients. However, in his satire of doctors and medicine Caviedes was following a long-standing satirical Western tradition.

== Work ==
As a writer Caviedes shares many characteristics with several of the writers of Spanish Golden Age, such as Francisco de Quevedo and Luis de Góngora, partially because of his satirical, biting, vulgar, popular, and picaresque wit. But behind this criticism is a social and moral attack on the abuses, injustices, and double standards of the Colonial period. He is also the author of serious love and religious poetry.

When Caviedes moved to Lima the targets of his satire included not only doctors, but also Lima aristocrats and the Viceregal court. Following satirical tradition, he attacked many professions, among them lawyers, tailors, and street women, with an emphasis on the grotesque, the scatological, the ugly, and the immoral. With some exceptions, the scandalous aspects of his work made publication difficult during his lifetime, but his works circulated in handwritten chapbooks and were collected in various manuscripts. There are several modern editions of his complete works.

== Sample of work ==
=== "Colloquium that a seriously ill doctor had with Death" ===
From: Diente del Parnaso/ Tooth of Parnassus (1689), Translated by Jack Child

Take care that in your eagerness
if you treat doctors this way
you'll force the priests and sacristans
to go on all fours.
Because neither sunstroke nor excess
or the worst parents-in-law
fruit or snow without liquor,
bullet, stockade or song
kill in one year as many
as the best doctor.
