= Lion of Bienservida =

- Spanish: León de Bienservida
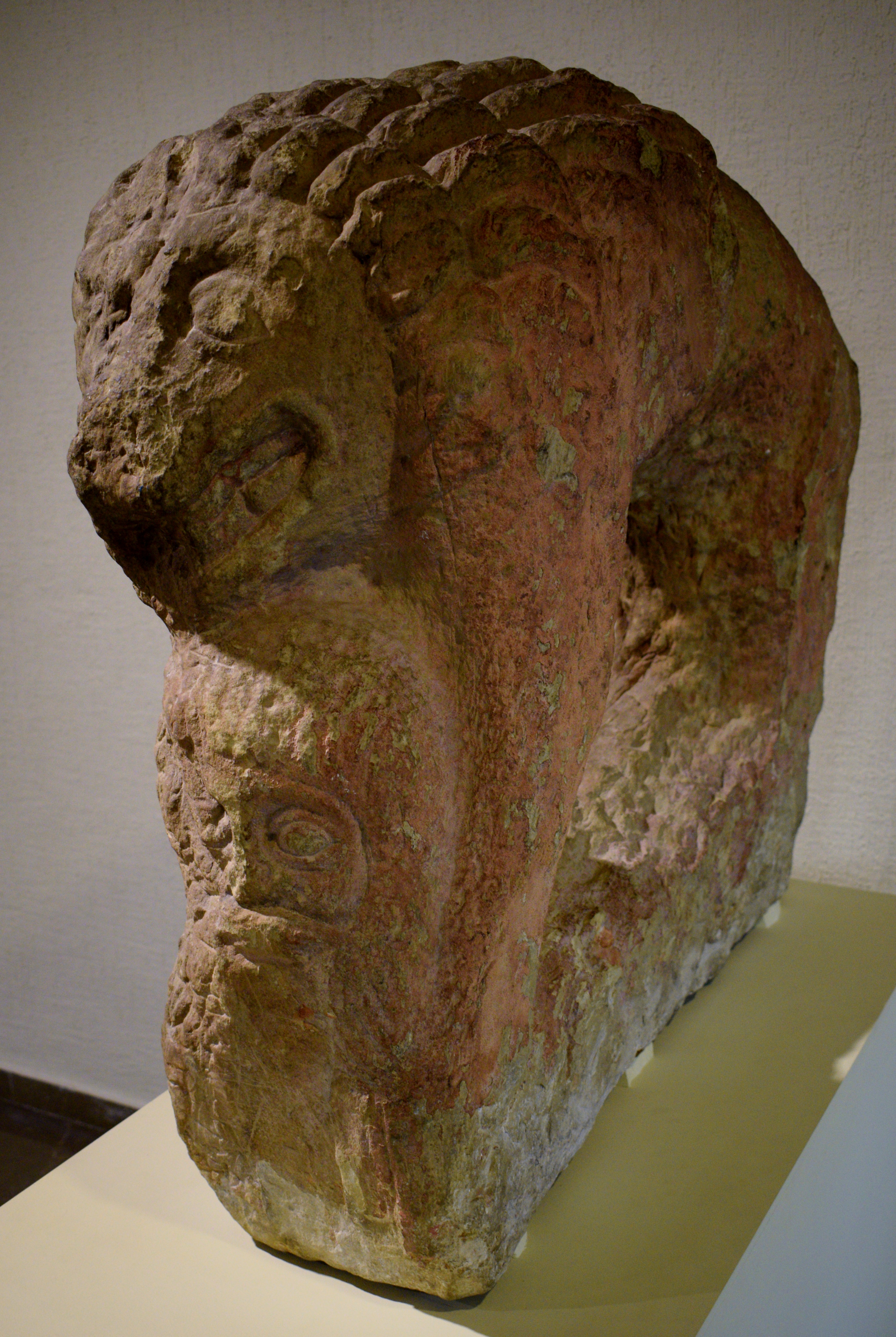
- Year: 4th–1st century BC
- Medium: Sandstone
- Dimensions: (0.98 x 0.81 x 0.31) m
- Location: Albacete Provincial Museum, Albacete, Spain

The Lion of Bienservida (also Lion of Villarrodrigo) is an ancient sculpture depicting a lion and a human head put on a plinth. It is exhibited at the Albacete Provincial Museum.

The piece was found in 1893 in the rural estate of Huertas de Bayona, in Villarrodrigo, in the Spanish province of Jaén. It was gifted to the Museum of Albacete in 1932. (Note: It is popularly known as Lion of Bienservida because the private owners who donated the piece were from Bienservida (province of Albacete), also close to the finding place, not far from the border between the provinces of Albacete and Jaén.)

It was dated by Teresa Chapa at the late 4th century BC. However, despite the rough carving, Carmen Aranegui sees no reason to classify the sculpture as an Iberian (Pre-Roman) artifact, rather considering the lion as art from the Roman republican period. The lion is depicted sheltering a human head (bearded and with moustache) within the claws. Chapa interprets the sculpture in the usual vein of the animal protecting the dead one while at the same time carrying their soul.
