= Bull of Osuna =

Ancient Iberian artifact

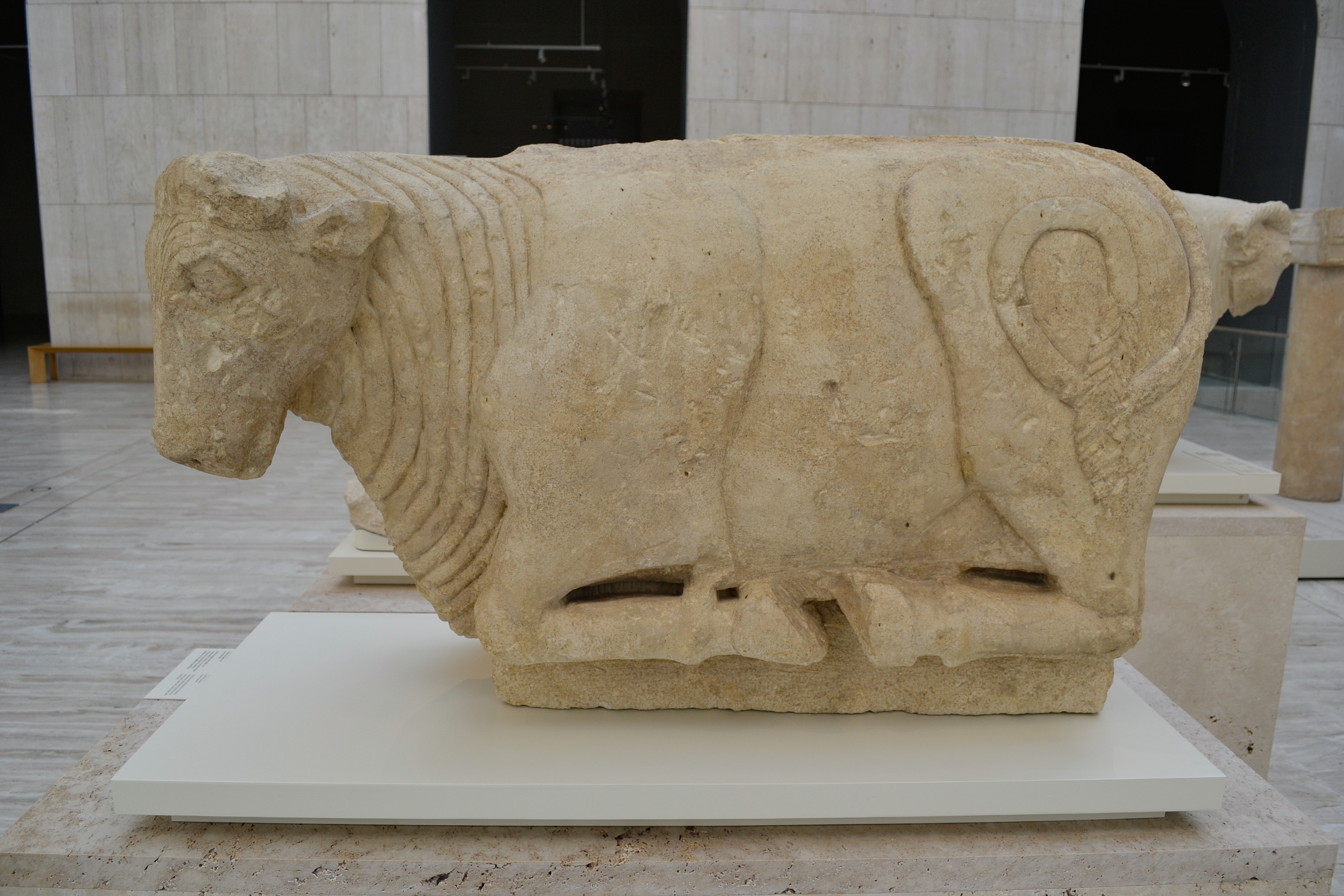
- Material: Limestone
- Height: 82 cm
- Width: 42.5 cm
- Created: late 5th century BCE
- Discovered: before 1904; Seville, Andalusia, Spain
- Present location: Madrid, Community of Madrid, Spain

The Bull of Osuna is a limestone high relief Iberian sculpture, 82 cm high, dated from the end of the 5th century BCE, that is on display at the National Archaeological Museum of Spain in Madrid. It was found in the archeological site of the ancient Iberian city of Urso (Osuna) in Seville, Spain. The bull is ashlar and was carved, (probably in a Turdetani workshop), as a funeral monument. It is believed to have had some protective function.
