= Albacete Provincial Museum =

Museum in Albacete, Spain

- Museo Provincial de Albacete (Spanish)
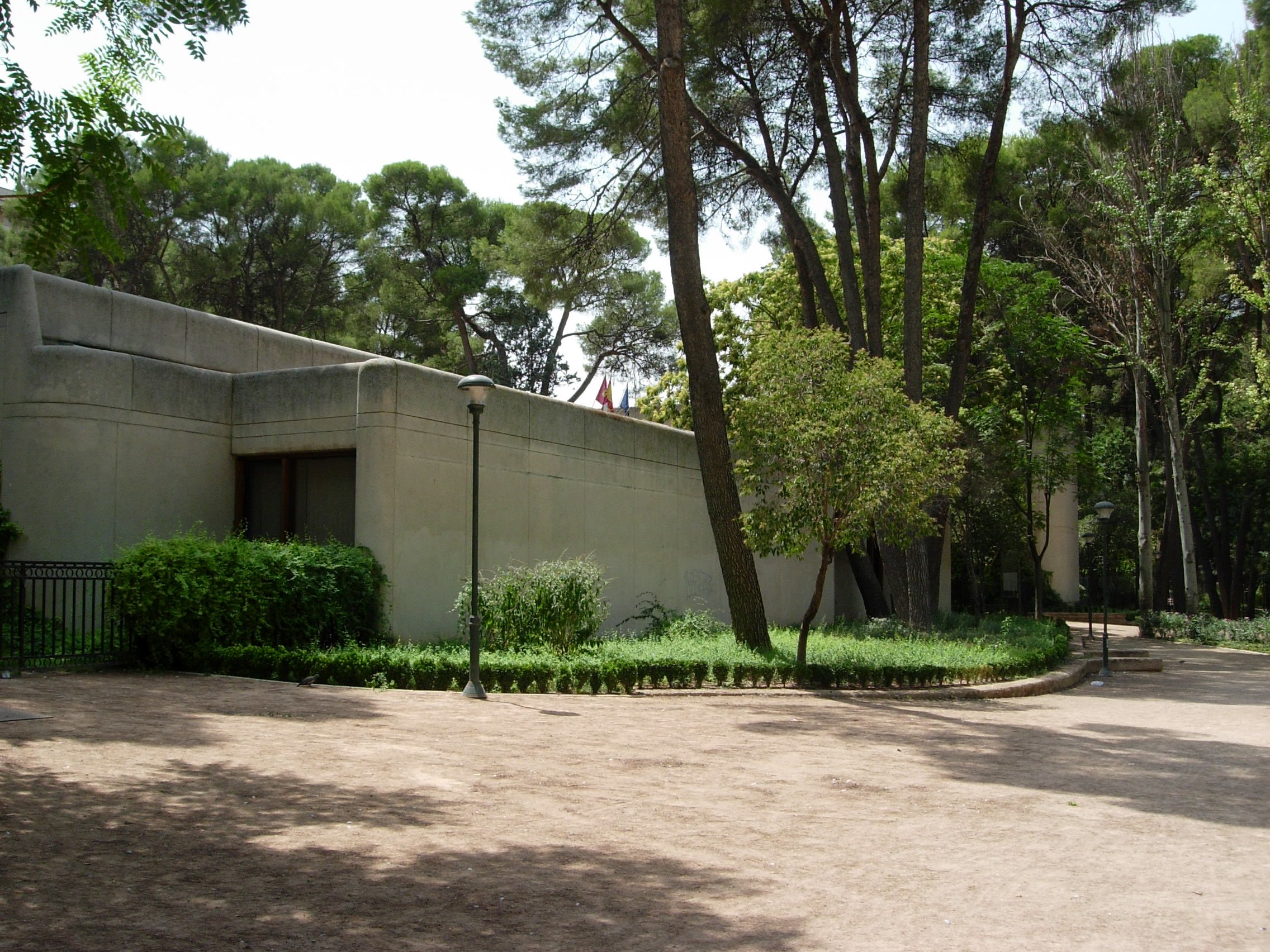

- Location within Spain
- 38.986442°N 1.855897°W
- Location: Albacete, Spain

Spanish Cultural Heritage
- Official name: Museo Provincial de Albacete
- Type: Non-movable
- Criteria: Monument
- Designated: 1962
- Reference no.: RI-51-0001301

The Albacete Provincial Museum (Museo Provincial de Albacete) is a museum of archeology and fine art located in Albacete, Spain. The museum has existed in various incarnations since 1927, and settled in its present building in Abelardo Sánchez Park in 1978. Its exhibits emphasize the development of regional civilization and art, and the museum is divided into subsections for archeology, fine arts, and ethnology. It was declared Bien de Interés Cultural in 1962.

The Joaquín Sánchez Jiménez Archaeology Museum houses a notable collection of Roman and pre-Roman artifacts. Local Paleolithic and Neolithic items are shown, as well as Roman art and tools. Iberian sculpture is featured as well.

The Benjamín Palencia fine arts section emphasizes 20th century works, and includes many pieces by local contemporary artists.

== Artifacts ==
- Sphinx of Haches
- Lion of Bienservida

== See also ==
- List of museums in Spain
