= Bogarra =

Municipality of Spain

Coordinates: 38°35′N 2°12′W

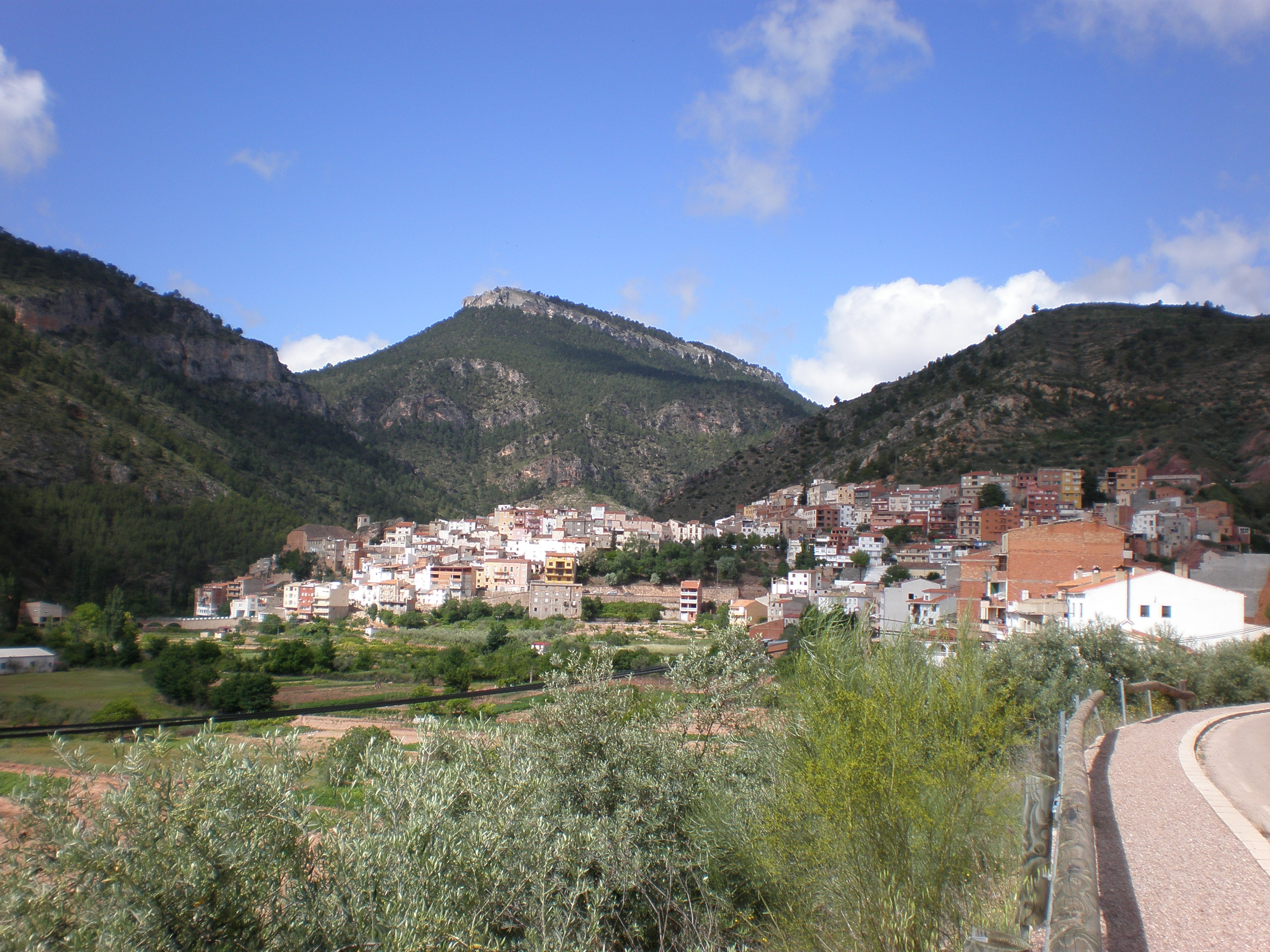
Panoramic view of Bogarra

Coat of arms of Bogarra

Bogarra is a municipality in Albacete, Castilla-La Mancha, Spain. It has a population of 1,235. The town is approximately 78 km from the main city of Albacete.

Bogarra is situated in a fertile valley containing several rivers and many fields. The main foodstuffs produced in the area are olives and almonds, along with other fruits such as grapes and figs. In antiquity, Bogarra was a Bastetani settlement then called Bigerra.

== See also ==
- Sphinx of Haches
