= Villarrodrigo =

Villarrodrigo, Spain
- city
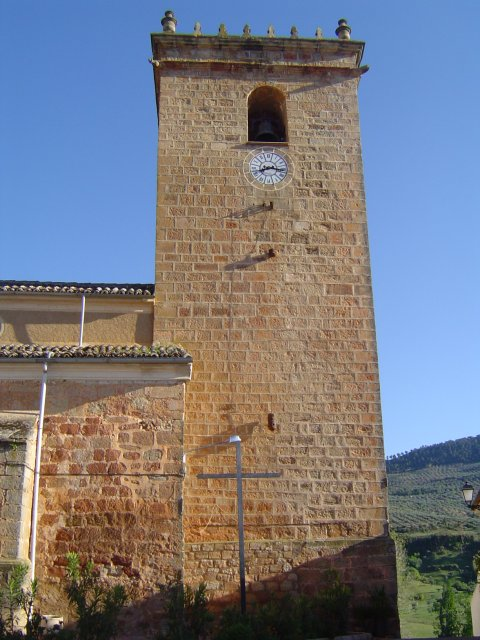
- Bell tower of the Parish Church of San Bartolomé in Villarrodrigo

- Coat of arms

- Location in the Province of Jaén Villarrodrigo (Andalusia) Villarrodrigo (Spain)
- Coordinates: 38°29′N 02°38′W
- Country: Spain
- Autonomous community: Andalusia
- Province: Jaén
- Municipality: Villarrodrigo

Area
  - Total: 78 km^{2} (30 sq mi)
- Elevation: 862 m (2,828 ft)

Population (2025-01-01)
  - Total: 371
  - Density: 4.8/km^{2} (12/sq mi)
- Time zone: UTC+1 (CET)
  - Summer (DST): UTC+2 (CEST)

Villarrodrigo is a city located in the province of Jaén, Spain. According to the 2005 census (INE), the city has a population of 510 inhabitants.

== See also ==
- Lion of Bienservida
- List of municipalities in Jaén
