= Montescudaio =

- Comune
- Comune di Montescudaio
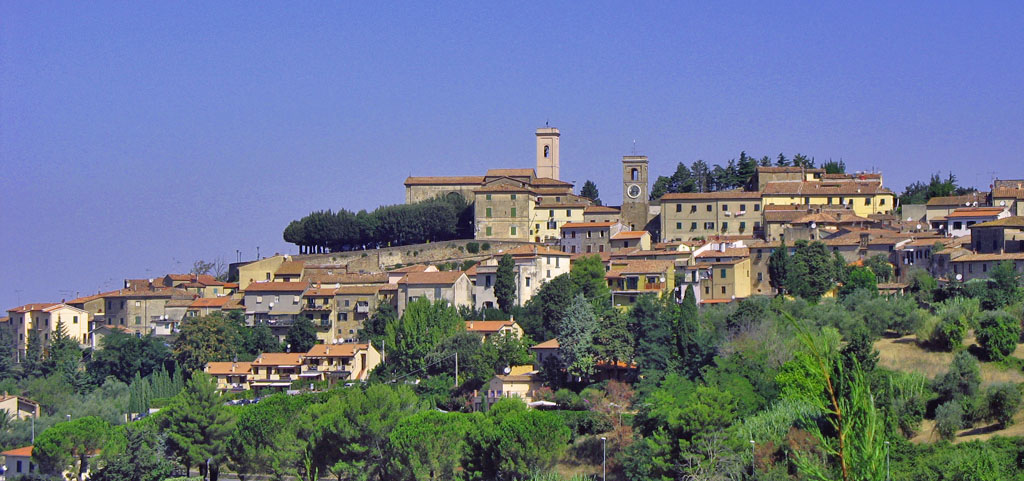

- Coat of arms

- Location within Italy Location within Tuscany
- Coordinates: 43°20′N 10°38′E
- Country: Italy
- Region: Tuscany
- Province: Pisa (PI)
- Frazioni: Fiorino

Government
  - Mayor: Aurelio Pellegrini

Area
  - Total: 19.9 km^{2} (7.7 sq mi)
- Elevation: 242 m (794 ft)

Population (Dec. 2004)
  - Total: 1,684
  - Density: 84.6/km^{2} (219/sq mi)
- Demonym: Montescudaini
- Time zone: UTC+1 (CET)
  - Summer (DST): UTC+2 (CEST)
- Postal code: 56040
- Dialing code: 0586
- Website: Official website

Montescudaio is a comune (municipality) in the Province of Pisa in the Italian region Tuscany, located about 70 kilometres (43 mi) southwest of Florence and about 45 kilometres (28 mi) southeast of Pisa. It is one of I Borghi più belli d'Italia ("The most beautiful villages of Italy").

== Twin towns ==
- Castril, Spain, since 2006
- Eberstadt, Germany, since 1984
- (United States Virgin Islands) Charlotte Amalie, U.S. Virgin Islands, since 2010
- (United States Virgin Islands) Christiansted, U.S. Virgin Islands, since 2010
- (United States Virgin Islands) Frederiksted, U.S. Virgin Islands, since 2010
- Brandýs nad Labem-Stará Boleslav
