= Torito of Porcuna =

Iberian sculpture

- Spanish: Torito de Porcuna
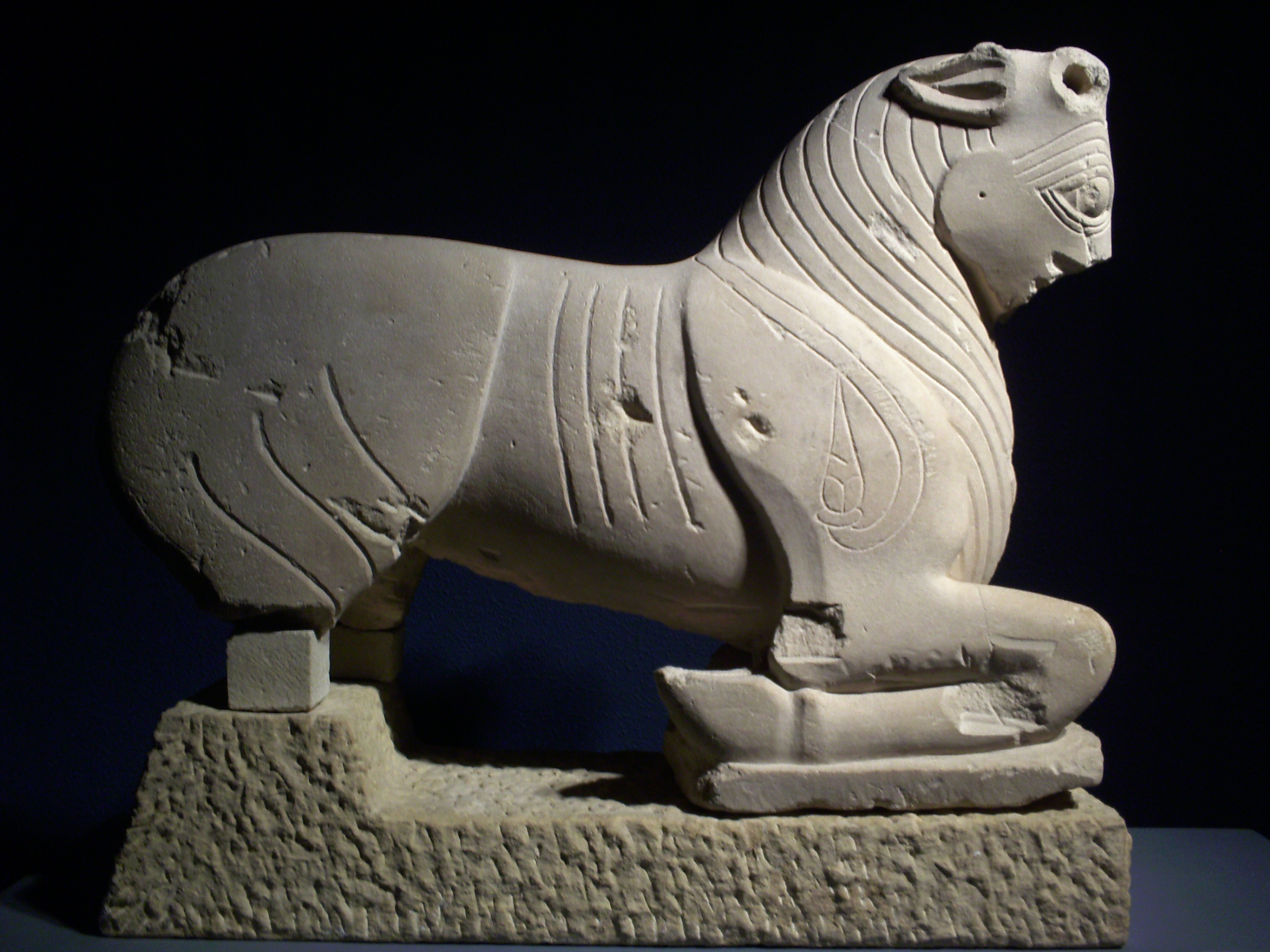
- Year: circa 6th century BC
- Medium: Sandstone
- Dimensions: (55.5 x 70.5 x 20.5) cm
- Weight: 83.70 kg
- Location: Museum of Jaén, Jaén, Spain

The Torito of Porcuna is an Iberian sculpture depicting a bull. It shows orientalizing influences and it is also referred to as the toro orientalizante de Porcuna ("orientalizing bull of Porcuna").

It is sculpted in sandstone. Found in 1946 in front of the Guardia Civil barracks of Porcuna (ancient Obulco/Ipolca) during some road works, it eventually came to be popularly known as torito ("small bull") because of its size relative to the bigger statues of bullocks found in the nearby site of Cerrillo Blanco. Originally, the bull possibly featured a number of ornamental add-ons on the head, and the missing horns were probably metallic.

The sculpture is also missing the snout and the hind legs.

The artifact has been variously dated from either the 5th to 4th century BC (the first assessment of Blanco, 1960), second half of the 6th century BC (Chapa, 1980), late 6th to early 5th century BC (Rouillard, 1998) or as early as the beginnings of the 6th century BC (reassessment of Blanco, 1987).

The surface of the statue is carved with floral ornaments, suggesting a sacred nature. It is similar to bulls featured in Phoenician ivory items and Greek and Cypriot cups.
