= Fiorino, Montescudaio =

Fiorino
- Frazione
- Location of Fiorino in Italy
- Coordinates: 43°19′20″N 10°32′15″E
- Country: Italy
- Region: Tuscany
- Province: Pisa (PI)
- Comune: Montescudaio
- Elevation: 14 m (46 ft)

Population (2011)
  - Total: 503
- Time zone: UTC+1 (CET)
  - Summer (DST): UTC+2 (CEST)
- Postal code: 56040
- Dialing code: (+39) 0586

Fiorino is a village in Tuscany, central Italy, administratively a frazione of the comune of Montescudaio, province of Pisa. At the time of the 2001 census its population was 299.

Fiorino is about 60 km from Pisa and 9 km from Montescudaio.
