= Lady of Ibiza =

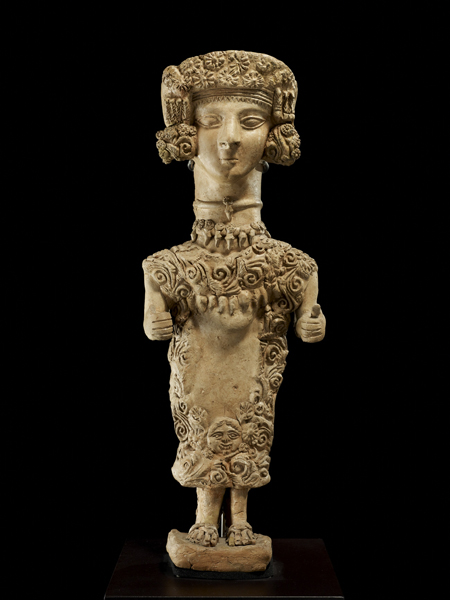
- Material: Clay
- Height: 47 cm
- Width: 16.5 cm
- Created: 3rd century BC
- Discovered: before 1995; Ibiza, Balearic Islands, Spain
- Present location: Madrid, Community of Madrid, Spain

The Lady of Ibiza is a ceramic figure, 47 cm tall, that dates from the third century BC. It is on display in the National Archaeological Museum of Spain in Madrid.

The figure was found in the necropolis of Puig des Molins on the island of Ibiza in the Mediterranean. It was made using a mold and has a cavity in the back, perhaps used for hanging it up. She is richly ornamented in terms of clothing and jewelry.

Most of the figures found in the Puig des Molins necropolis are representations of Greek goddesses. It is believed that there was a large colony of immigrants there from Magna Graecia, (the Greek colonies of southern Italy), over the centuries. Carthaginian female figure.

== See also ==
- Iberian sculpture
- Carthaginian Iberia
- Tanit
