= Porcuna =

- village
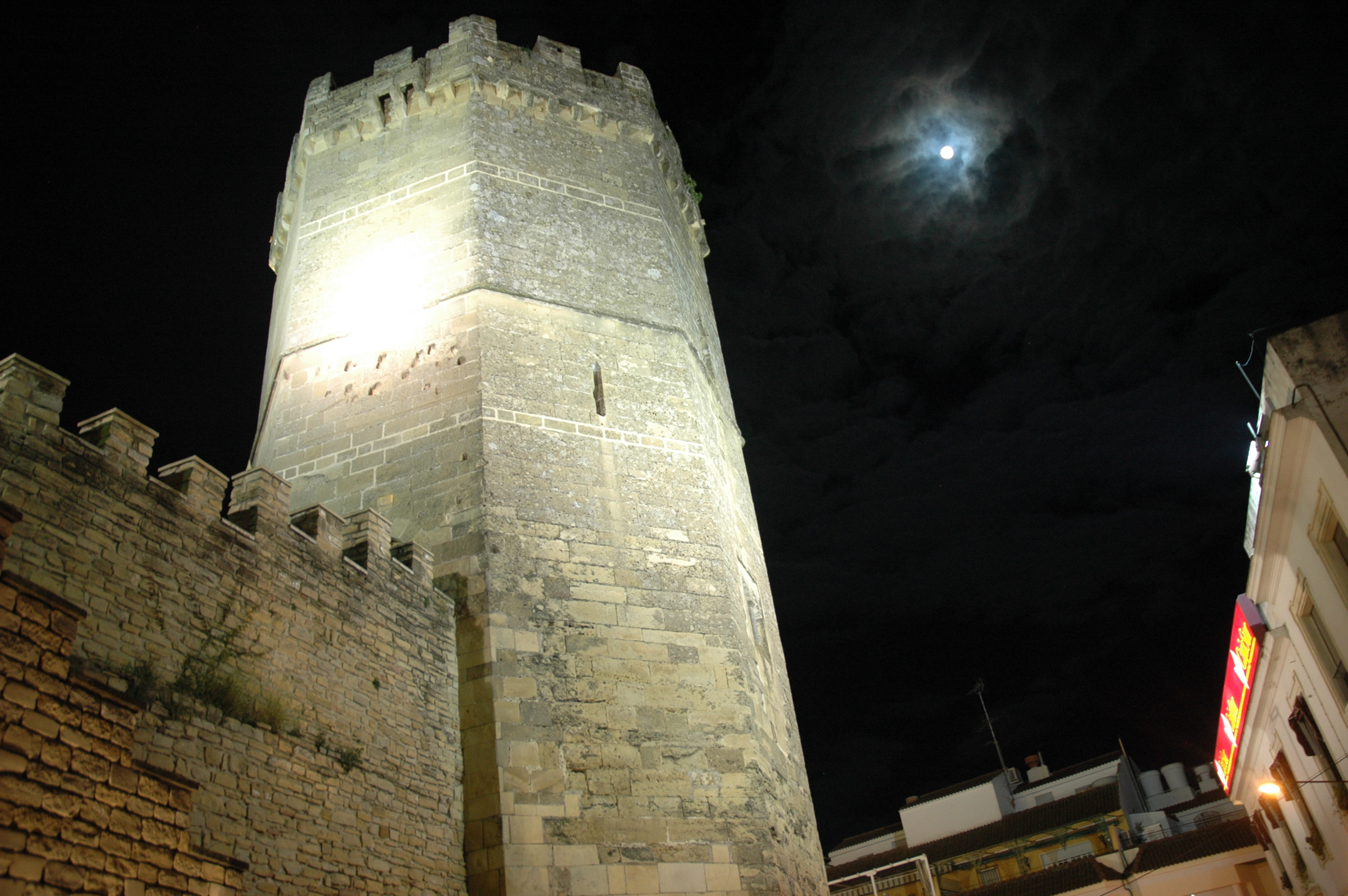
- New Tower in Porcuna Castle.

- Flag Coat of arms

- Location in the Province of Jaén Porcuna (Andalusia) Porcuna (Spain)
- Coordinates: 37°52′11″N 4°11′14″W
- Country: Spain
- Autonomous community: Andalusia
- Province: Jaén

Government
  - Mayor: Miguel Moreno Lorente

Area
  - Total: 176.3 km^{2} (68.1 sq mi)
- Elevation: 427 m (1,401 ft)

Population (2025-01-01)
  - Total: 5,936
  - Density: 33.67/km^{2} (87.20/sq mi)
- Demonym: Porcunenses
- Time zone: UTC+1 (CET)
  - Summer (DST): UTC+2 (CEST)
- Website: Official website

Porcuna is a village and municipality in the province of Jaén in Andalusia, Spain, 42 km from Jaén and 50 km from Córdoba. The primary occupation of the 6,990 inhabitants is olive growing. The main tourist attractions are the tower of Boabdil, the Casa Piedra, the Paseo de Jesús and the various hermitages.

One of Porcuna's famous sons is the Baroque poet Juan del Valle y Caviedes, born here around 1645, who moved to Peru at an early age and wrote biting satirical works attacking the hypocrisy of the Colonial upper class society of Lima.

== See also ==
- Bear of Porcuna
- Torito of Porcuna
- List of municipalities in Jaén
