= Bear of Porcuna =

- Spanish: Osa de Porcuna
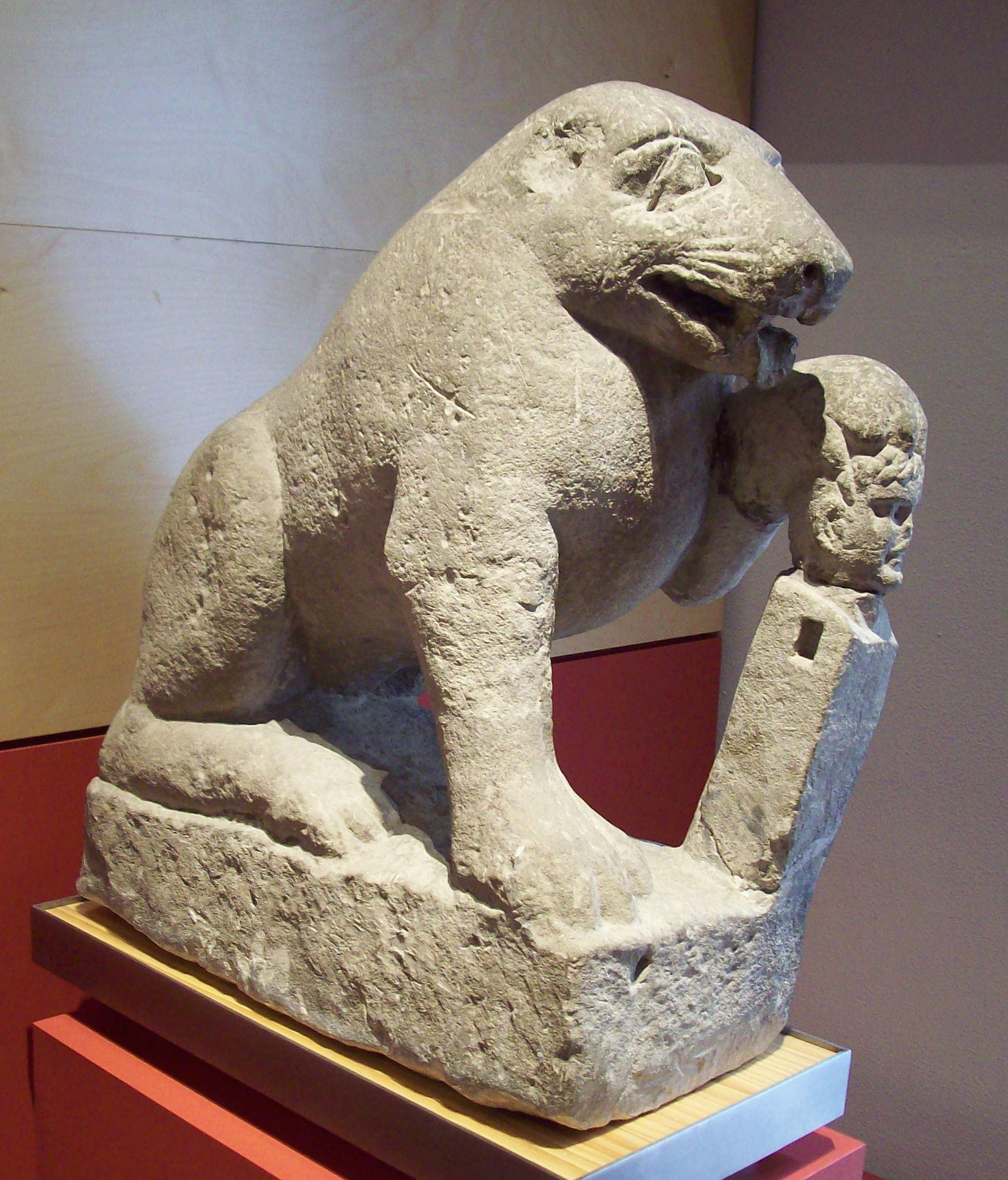
- Year: circa late 1st century BC
- Medium: Limestone
- Dimensions: (79 x 70 x 32) cm
- Location: National Archaeological Museum, Madrid, Spain

The Bear of Porcuna is a sculpture dated from the 1st century BC depicting a bear or a lioness leaning on a herma. It is exhibited at the National Archaeological Museum in Madrid, Spain.

The artifact was found in 1926 in Porcuna—the Roman Obulco—, most specifically in the calle del Sepulcro, during the building works of an oil mill.

The animal (a bear or a lioness) is depicted resting on its hindquarters. The animal is leaning its front left leg on a herma, featuring a beardless male head. The presence of the herma in the composition strongly suggests a Roman-era dating. Regarding the Roman hypothesis, there are tentative datings from either the time of Augustus or somewhat later in the Julio-Claudian dynasty.

It unmistakably served a funerary purpose.
