= Lady of Galera =

Alabaster female figurine, made in the 7th century BC

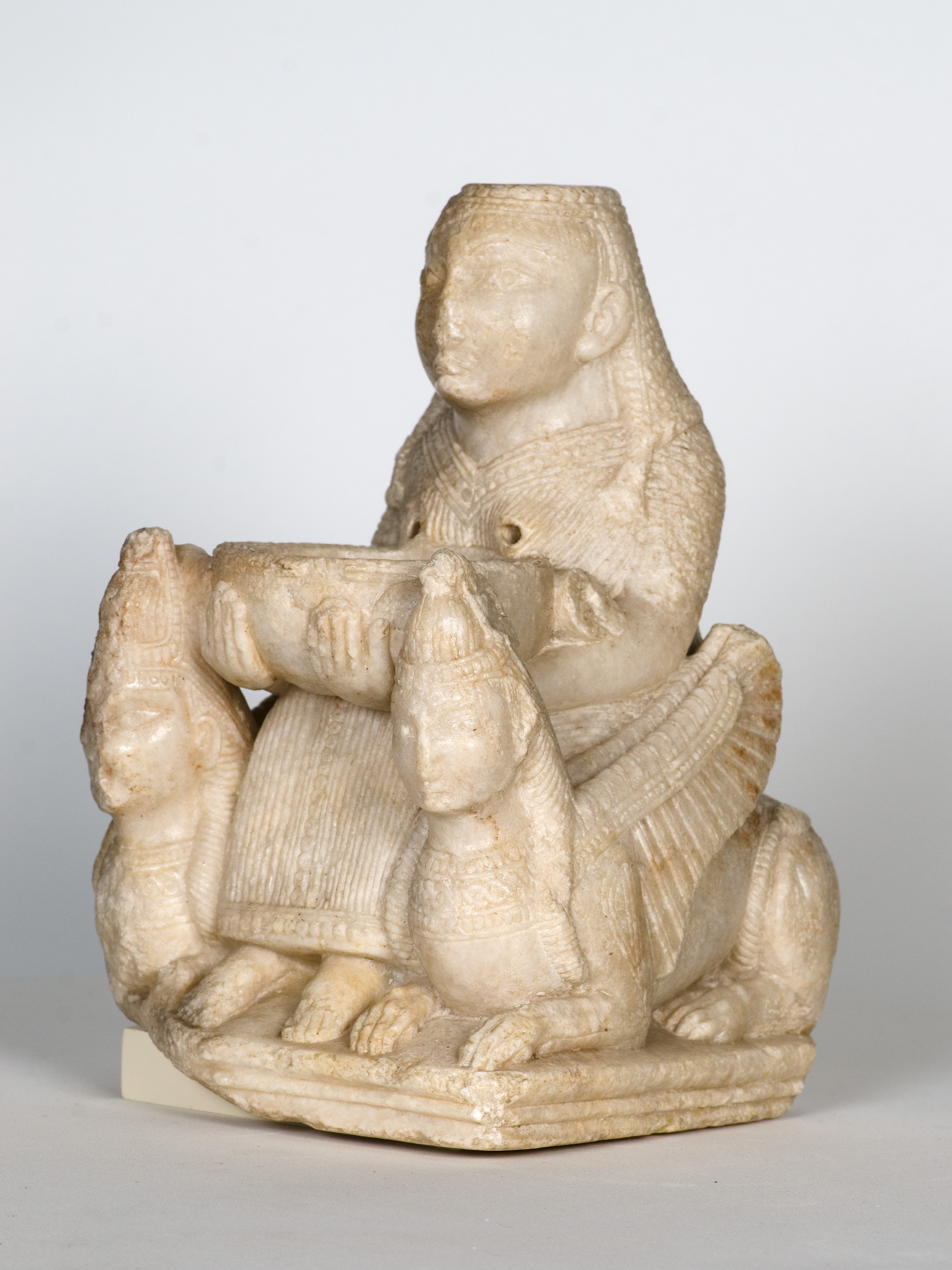
- Material: Alabaster
- Created: c. 650 BC
- Discovered: before 1970; Galera, Andalusia, Spain
- Present location: Madrid, Community of Madrid, Spain

The Lady of Galera is an alabaster female figurine, made in the 7th century BC, that probably represents the Near Eastern goddess Astarte. It is at the National Archaeological Museum of Spain, in Madrid.

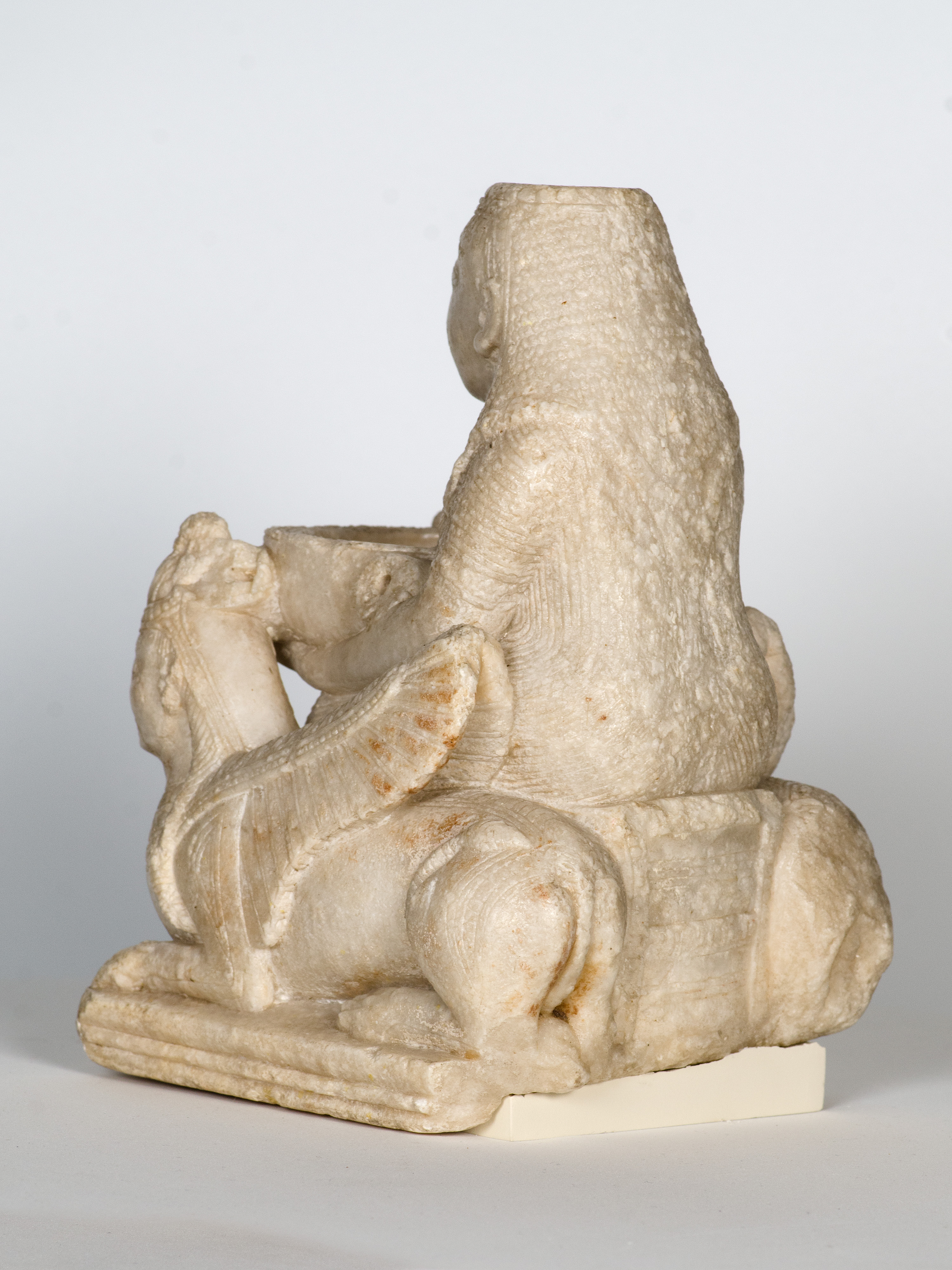

The Lady of Galera is most likely of Phoenician manufacture. She sits between two sphinxes and holds a bowl for liquid that poured from two holes in her breasts. Her hair and costume show Egyptian influences, but the sturdy form also resembles Mesopotamian statues. She may have lasted through several generations as a sacred object before being buried as grave goods.

The figurine was found in Galera, a Spanish town once called Tutugi, in Granada province. Nearby, in Cerro del Real, is the Iberian Necropolis of Tutugi, an important archeological site with various kinds of tombs. The most common type of tomb there consists of a rectangular chamber covered by a circular mound, which is reached via a long corridor. Artifacts discovered in these tombs include Phoenician, Greek and Iberian vases, ornaments, weapons, furniture and figures of clay and alabaster, dating between the third and sixth centuries BC.

== See also ==
- Iberian sculpture
- Astarte
- Tanit
- Carthaginian Iberia
