= Bicha of Balazote =

6th-century BC Iberian sculpture

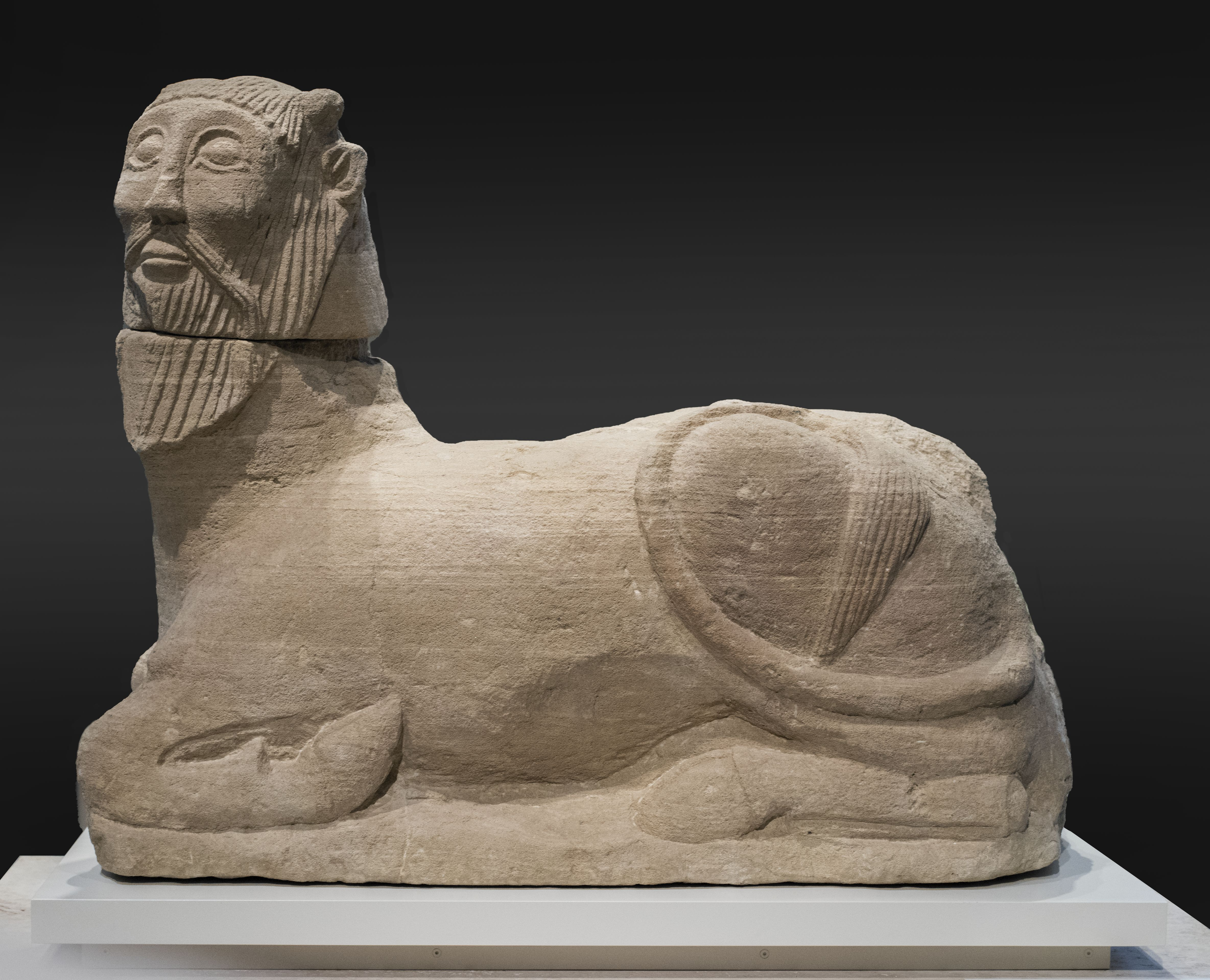
- Material: Limestone
- Height: 73 cm
- Width: 93 cm
- Created: late 6th century BC
- Discovered: Balazote, Castilla–La Mancha, Spain
- Present location: Madrid, Community of Madrid, Spain

The Bicha of Balazote is an Iberian sculpture that was found in the borough of Balazote in Albacete province (Castile-La Mancha), Spain. Carlos Fuentes has called it the "Beast of Balazote." The sculpture has been dated to the 6th century BCE, and has been in the National Archaeological Museum of Spain in Madrid, since 1910.

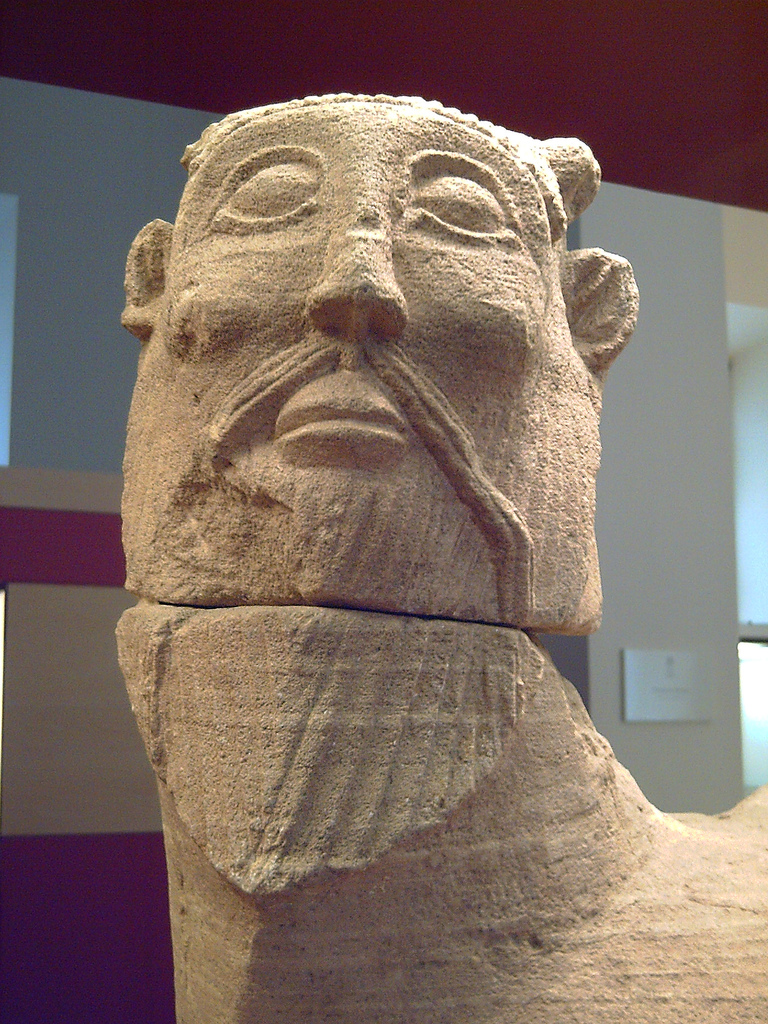
The head

The Bicha was found at the site of Majuelos not far from the city center. Recent excavations in the Balazote plain revealed a tomb and burial mound where this piece may have originated. Nearby, important mosaics from a Roman villa were also discovered.

Carved of two limestone blocks in the second half of the 6th century BCE, the statue is 93 cm long and 73 cm high. It is a chimeric synthesis of man and a bull. The body is in repose and shows good knowledge of the traits of that animal, with the forelegs bent under the chest and hind legs tucked under the belly. The tail is curved on the left thigh and ends in a tuft of hair. The head is that of a horned, bearded man with bull's ears. Details of the sculpture are similar to archaic Greek hieratic sculpture in that the hair and beard are rendered by straight grooves.

The piece is not carved in entirely in the round; one corner appears to be ashlar and designed to adhere to some place, like the lions of the Mausoleum of Pozo Moro. It may have belonged to a tomb or temple. There is some possibility that it represents a god of fertility, as did the man-headed bull statues used by the Greeks to represent river gods which made the fields fertile. According to A. García and Bellido, the Bicha represents the Greek river god Achelous whose image on Sicilian coins it resembles. "This sculpture is a daughter of the Greeks, and if you will, granddaughter of the Phoenicians and great-granddaughter of Mesopotamia," A. García and Bellido observed in 1931.

== See also ==
- Balazote
- Oretani
