= Sphinx of Haches =

5th-century BC Iberian sculpture

- Spanish: Esfinge de Haches
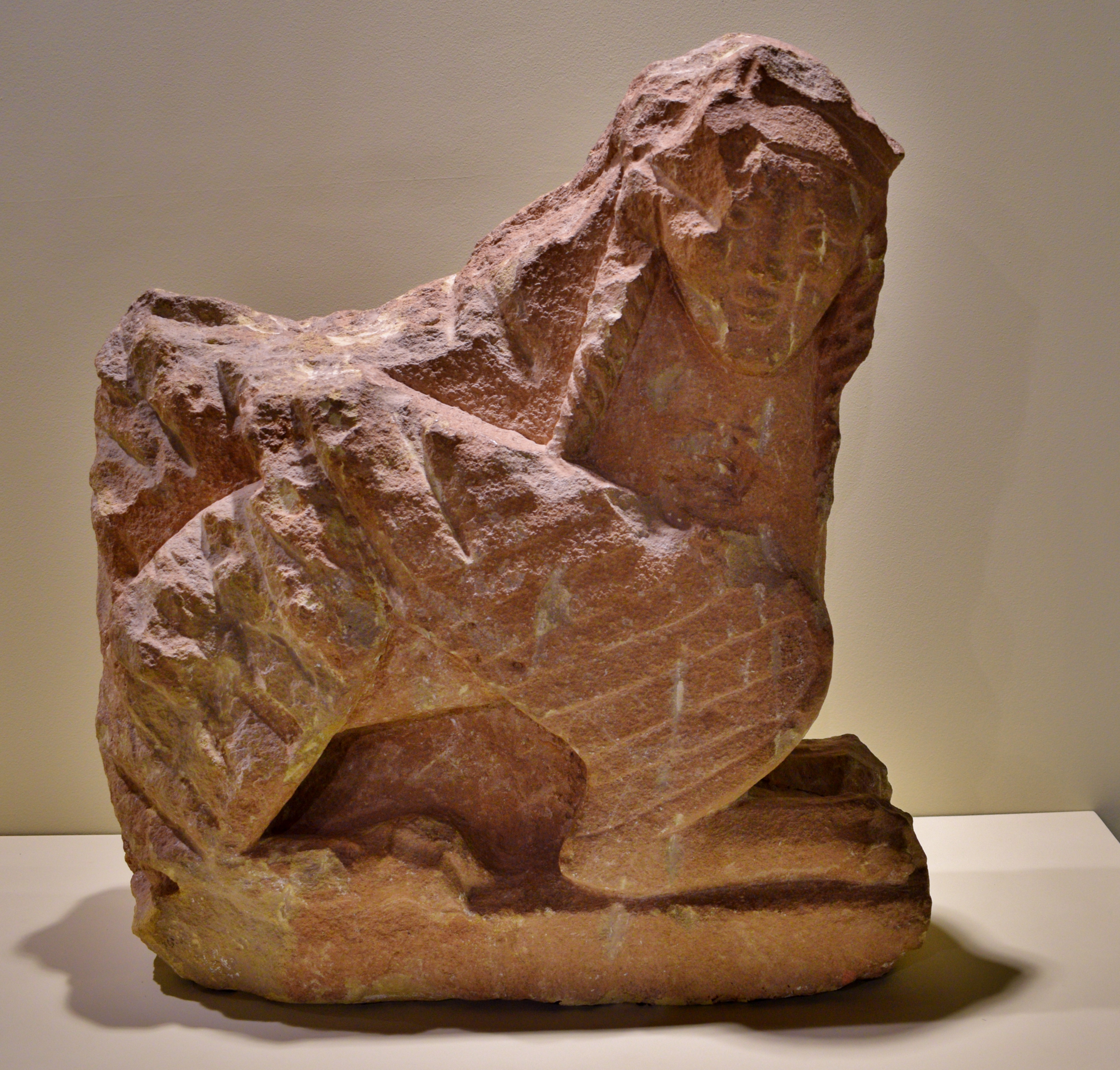
- Year: circa 5th century BC
- Medium: Sandstone
- Dimensions: (65 x 60 x 25) cm
- Location: Albacete Provincial Museum, Albacete, Spain

The Sphinx of Haches is an Iberian sculpture depicting a sphinx. It is exhibited at the Albacete Provincial Museum.

Presented as an example of the increasing influence of Greek colonists from the 5th century BC forward in the territory of the Iberian Peninsula currently occupied by the Spanish region of Castilla–La Mancha, the smile of the mythical creature is reminiscent of those of the korai from the ancient Greek sculpture of the Archaic period.

The piece was found in 1947 in the Cerro de los Gavilanes, near the tower of Haches (municipality of Bogarra) during the course of some agricultural works.
