= Castril =

- municipality
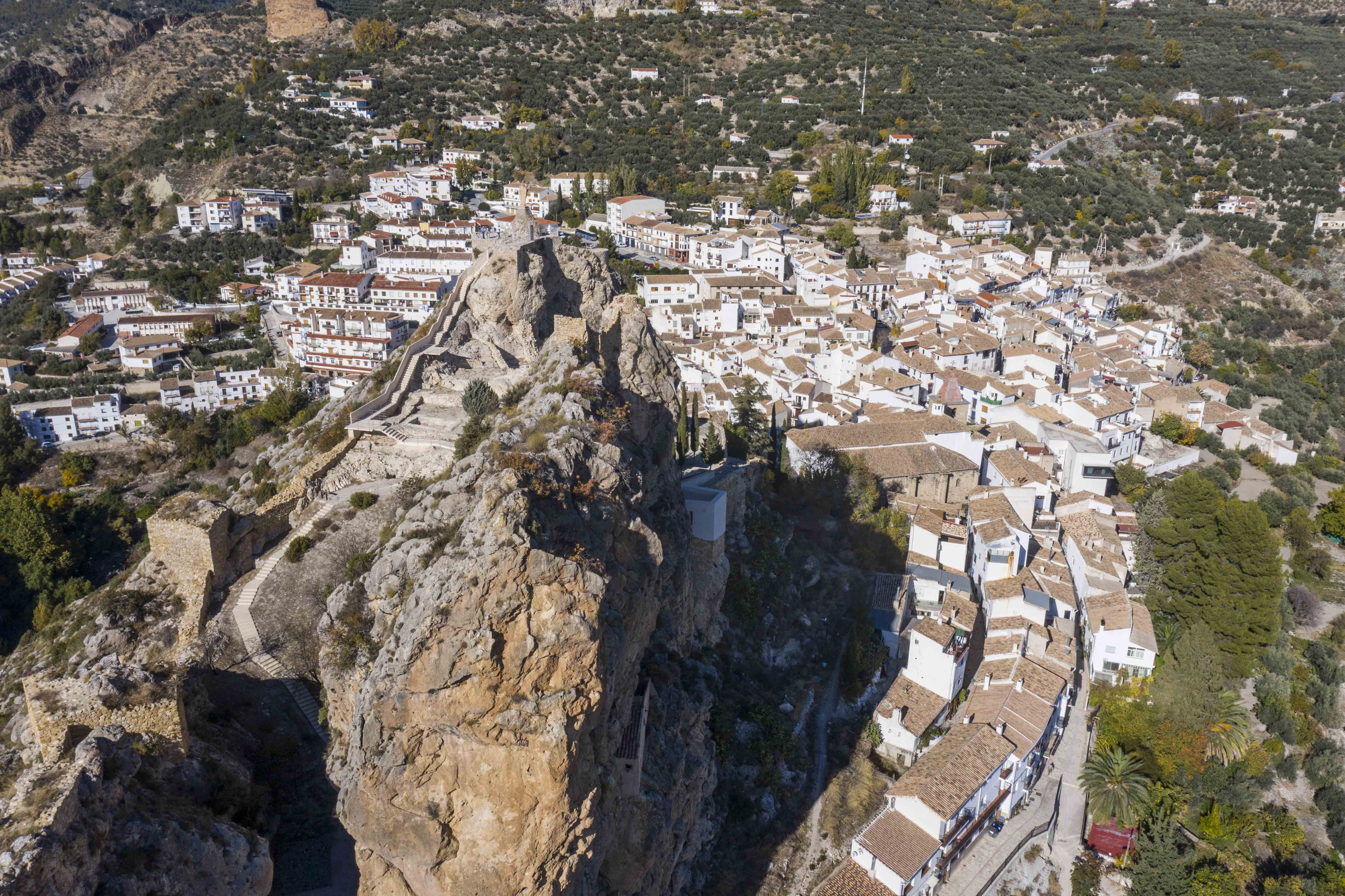

- Flag Coat of arms

- Location of Castril in the Province of Granada Location of Castril in Spain
- Coordinates: 37°47′N 2°46′W
- Country: Spain
- Province: Granada
- Comarca: Huéscar

Government
  - Mayor (since 2019): Miguel Pérez Jiménez (Ind.)

Area
  - Total: 247 km^{2} (95 sq mi)
- Elevation: 890 m (2,920 ft)

Population (2025-01-01)
  - Total: 1,927
  - Density: 7.80/km^{2} (20.2/sq mi)
- Time zone: UTC+1 (CET)
  - Summer (DST): UTC+2 (CEST)
- Website: www.castril.es

Castril, formerly Castril de la Peña, is a municipality located in the province of Granada, Spain.

== Administration ==
Castril includes the following communities (2006):

- Almontaras
- Castril
- Cebas
- Fátima
- Fuente Vera
- Martín

== Twin towns ==
- Azinhaga, Portugal
- Eberstadt, Germany
- Montescudaio, Italy
- Tías, Spain

== See also ==
- List of municipalities in Granada
