= Galera, Granada =

Galera
- Municipality
- Coat of arms

- Location within Province of Granada Location within Andalusia Location within Spain
- Coordinates: 37°44′35″N 2°33′05″W
- Country: Spain
- Autonomous community: Andalusia
- Province: Granada
- Comarca: Huéscar
- Judicial district (partido judicial): Huéscar

Government
  - alcalde (mayor): Manuel Serral Rodríguez (2007) (PSOE)

Area
  - Total: 117 km^{2} (45 sq mi)
- Elevation: 843 m (2,766 ft)

Population (2025-01-01)
  - Total: 1,139
- Demonym(s): galerino (m.), galerina (f.)
- Time zone: UTC+1 (CET)
  - Summer (DST): UTC+2 (CEST)
- Postal Code: 18840
- Area code: (+34) 958
- Province code: 18
- Municipality code: 082
- Distance from Granada: 150 km
- Website: galera.sedelectronica.es/info.0

Galera is a municipality in the comarca of Huéscar, province of Granada, autonomous community of Andalusia, Spain. It is situated in a sparsely populated area roughly 150 kilometres (93 mi) from the provincial capital, Granada.

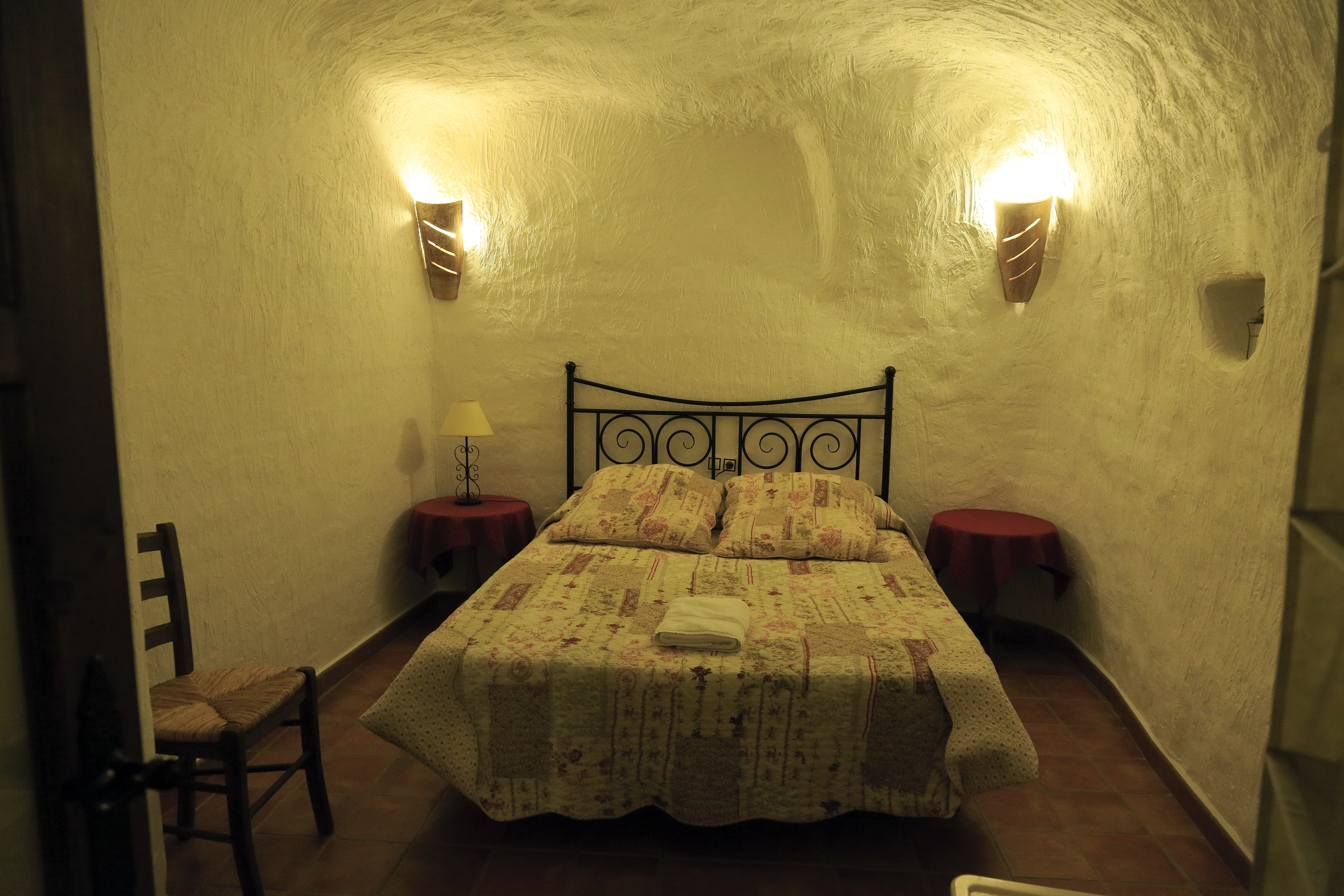
Room in a cave

The district has been inhabited since prehistoric times, and the municipality has two important archaeological sites. It is also notable for the number of cave houses.

== Demographics ==
The population of the municipality is distributed among the districts in the following manner (2008):

Population by district (2008)
District	Inhabitants.
Buenavista	15
Cortijos del Cura	35
Galera	979
La Alquería	105

Historical population

Year	Pop.	±% p.a.
1999	1,360	—
2000	1,309	−3.75%
2001	1,281	−2.14%
2002	1,243	−2.97%

Year	Pop.	±% p.a.
2003	1,197	−3.70%
2004	1,152	−3.76%
2005	1,127	−2.17%
2006	1,119	−0.71%

Year	Pop.	±% p.a.
2007	1,135	+1.43%
2008	1,134	−0.09%
2009	1,106	−2.47%

== History ==
=== Archaeology ===
There are two significant archeological sites in the vicinity of Galera.

- Castellon Alto

Excavations have uncovered the Bronze Age Argaric culture at "Castellón Alto" or "Castellón de Arriba", where archeologists have excavated many tombs in several artificial terraces on a hill of vertical walls.

==== Finds ====
Finds include a mummified body currently on display in Galera's museum.

- Tutugi

Tútugi refers to an Iberian necropolis on the hill above the modern village. Since the siege of Galera in 1570, the hill has also been known as the Cerro del Real. Tutugi is also sometimes used more generally as the placename for Galera in ancient times. The necropolis was initially investigated by treasure hunters. However, there have since been proper excavations of the site, which has several types of tombs. The most numerous type of tomb consists of a rectangular chamber, covered by a circular tumulus and reached through a long passage.

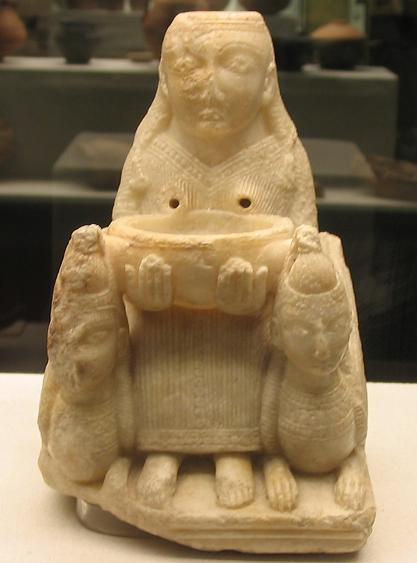
The "Goddess" of Galera. National Archaeological Museum of Spain.

==== Finds ====
Various objects have been found in these tombs, such as ornaments, Phoenician, Ancient Greek and Iberian vases, weapons, and such funerary goods as alabaster clay figures. These have been dated between the 6th and 3rd centuries BCE.

The "Lady of Galera" or "Goddess of Galera" (see image at left) was found in the 5th century BCE tomb number 20, zone 1 of the Necropolis. The figurine, which is currently on display in Madrid, is Phoenician and from the 7th century BCE. It is similar to another found in Carthage, North Africa), made of alabaster, and probably represents the goddess Astarte. The "lady" or "goddess" is seated between two sphinxes and has an opening through which liquid can be poured into it, which will emerge from small holes corresponding to the nipples of the breasts. The robust forms of the figure suggest Mesopotamian influences; the stylization of the clothing and hair suggest Egyptian influences. It is believed that this sacred object was passed down for many generations before being used as part of a burial.

=== Roman era and later ===
The settlement maintained its importance in the Roman era as "TVTVGI", but fell somewhat in population during the Visigothic period and the era of Muslim-ruled Al-Andalus.

Rodrigo Jiménez de Rada, archbishop of Toledo, conquered Galera in 1230; it was recovered in 1319 by Ismail I of Granada, and conquered definitively by Castile in 1488, during the reign of the Catholic Monarchs Isabella and Ferdinand. The people of Galera participated in the Morisco Revolt of 1568. In Galera, the revolt was personally suppressed by Don John of Austria, who made a house-by-house assault of the city and salted the fields to make it impossible to grow crops. All of the 2,500 inhabitants were slaughtered in what is known as the Galera Massacre In the 16th century, Galera was repopulated by families coming principally from Valencia, Murcia, and La Mancha.

== See also ==
- List of municipalities in Granada
