= Castilléjar =

Castilléjar, Spain
- municipality
- Flag Coat of arms

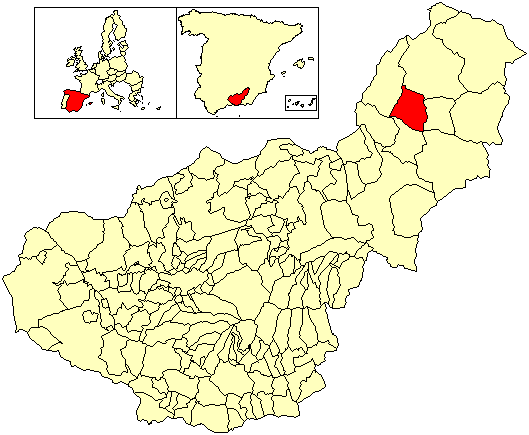
- Location of Castilléjar
- Coordinates: 37°43′N 2°38′W
- Country: Spain
- Province: Granada
- Municipality: Castilléjar

Area
  - Total: 132 km^{2} (51 sq mi)
- Elevation: 792 m (2,598 ft)

Population (2025-01-01)
  - Total: 1,284
  - Density: 9.73/km^{2} (25.2/sq mi)
- Time zone: UTC+1 (CET)
  - Summer (DST): UTC+2 (CEST)

Castilléjar is a municipality located in the province of Granada, Spain. It lies near the confluence of the Rio Galera and the Rio Guardal, approximately at the geographic centre of the Altiplano de Granada. According to the 2006 census (INE), the town has a population of 1,619 inhabitants.

== See also ==
- List of municipalities in Granada
