= Warrior of Mogente =

Bronze figure, 5th or 4th century BC

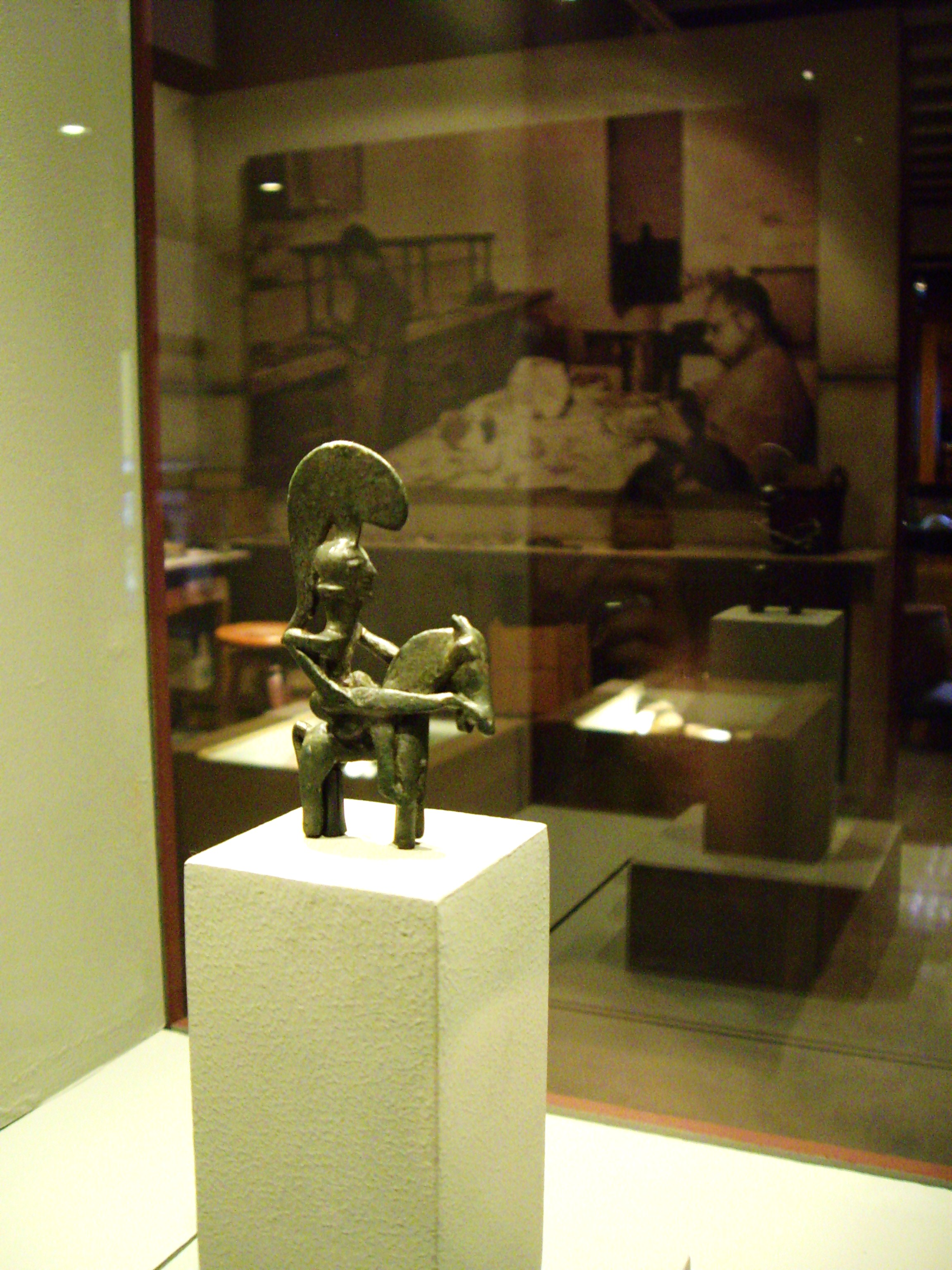
Warrior of Mogente

Warrior of Moixent (Valencian: El Guerrer de Moixent, Spanish: El Guerrero de Mogente) is a figure that represents a warrior sitting on a horse. The figure is made out of cast bronze. Warrior of Moixent is from the 5th century or 4th century BCE. The figure was found in 1931, close to Moixent, Spain. Warrior of Moixent is located at Prehistory Museum of Valencia.
