= Pere Johan =

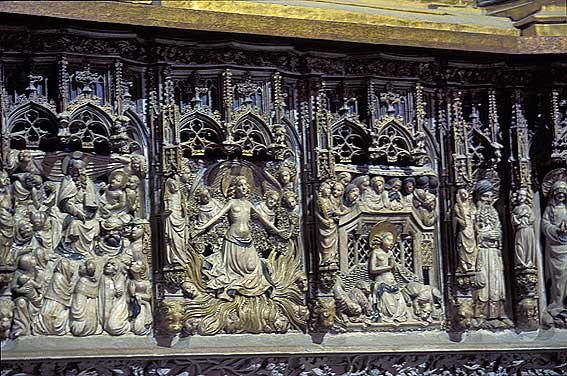
Predella for the high altar in the Cathedral of Tarragona.

Pere Johan or Pere Joan (born c. 1400) was a Catalan Gothic sculptor.

He was the son of sculptor Jordi de Déu, a former slave and disciple of sculptor Jaume Cascalls. His first solo works are known from the late 1410s, such as a keystone in the nave of the Cathedral of Barcelona representing the Eternal Father in Glory surrounded by Angels (1418), the eastern façade of the Palau de la Generalitat de Catalunya and several gargoyles in the Gothic façade of the Casa della Ciutat in Barcelona.

His main works are the retablo for the Cathedral of Tarragona (1426) and panels for the high altar in the Cathedral of Zaragoza (1434), both commissioned by archbishop of Tarragona Dalmau de Mur. He also executed the frontal of the sepulchre of Hugo de Urriés, in the Cathedral of Huesca.

In 1450, at the request of King Alfonso V of Aragon, Pere Johan went to Naples to work on the decoration of the Castel Nuovo, collaborating in the triumphal arch of the entrance with Guillem Sagrera from Majorca. This is his last known work.
