= Head of Christ (Cascalls) =

Sculpture by Jaume Cascalls

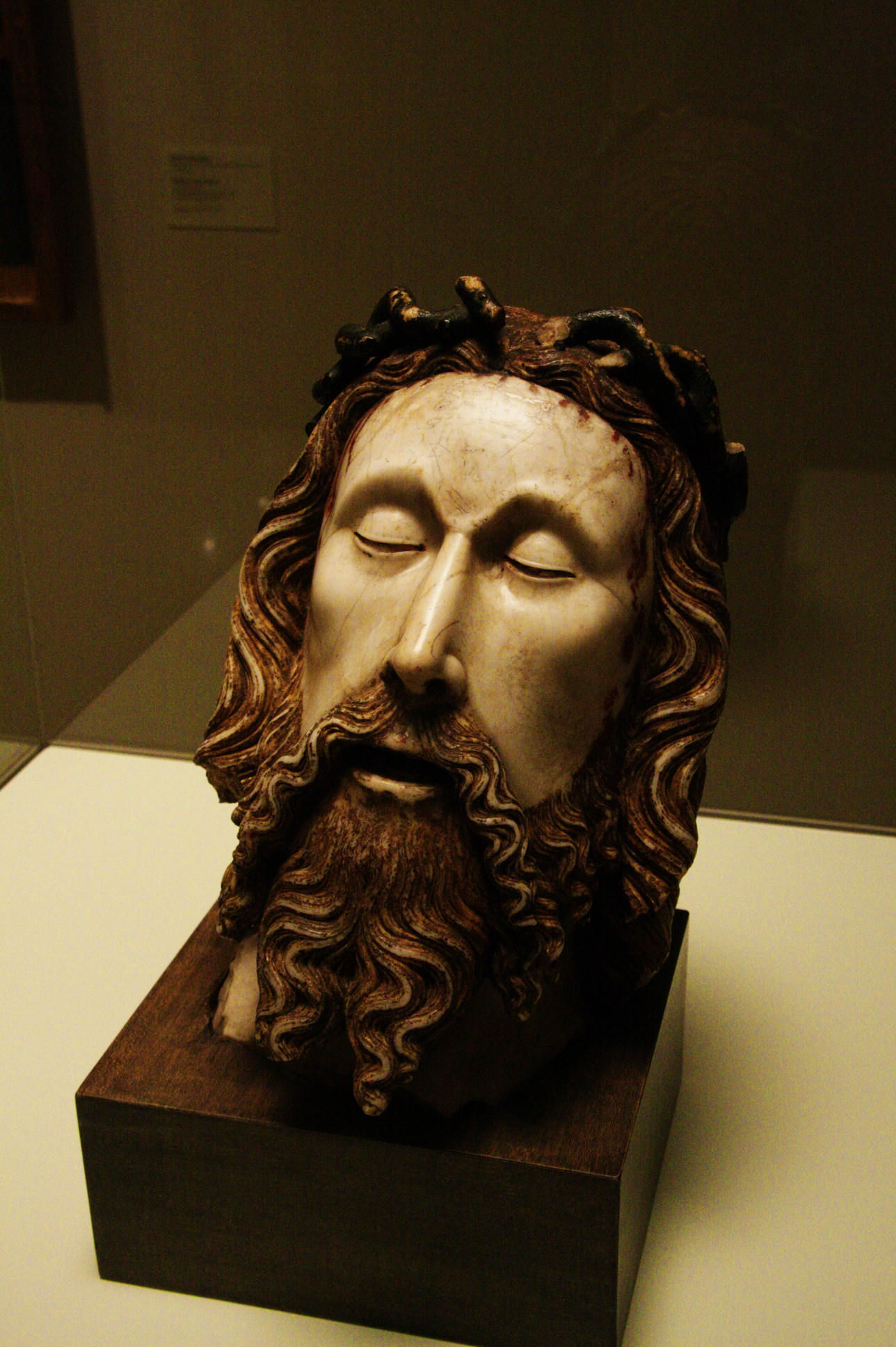
- Artist: Jaume Cascalls
- Year: c. 1352
- Type: Carved alabaster with polychrome and gilt remains
- Dimensions: 28.5 cm × 20 cm × 25 cm (11.2 in × 7.9 in × 9.8 in)
- Location: Museu Nacional d'Art de Catalunya; Barcelona

The Head of Christ is a Jesus head conserved at the National Art Museum of Catalonia.

== Description ==
Jaume Cascalls is one of the most important sculptors of the fourteenth century in Catalonia. This is borne out by his involvement over almost thirty years with the project of the royal pantheon in Poblet for King Peter the Ceremonious and with other large undertakings of the time. Today, on stylistic grounds, he is credited with this 'Head of Christ', which must have formed part of a sculptural group of the Holy Sepulchre, presumably from the church of the convent of Sant Agustí Vell in Barcelona. The break in the neck suggests it belonged to a full-length recumbent Christ, like the one kept at Sant Feliu in Girona and also attributed to Cascalls.
