= Archaeology Museum of Catalonia =

Archaeology museum in Catalonia, Spain

- Museu d'Arqueologia de Catalunya (MAC)

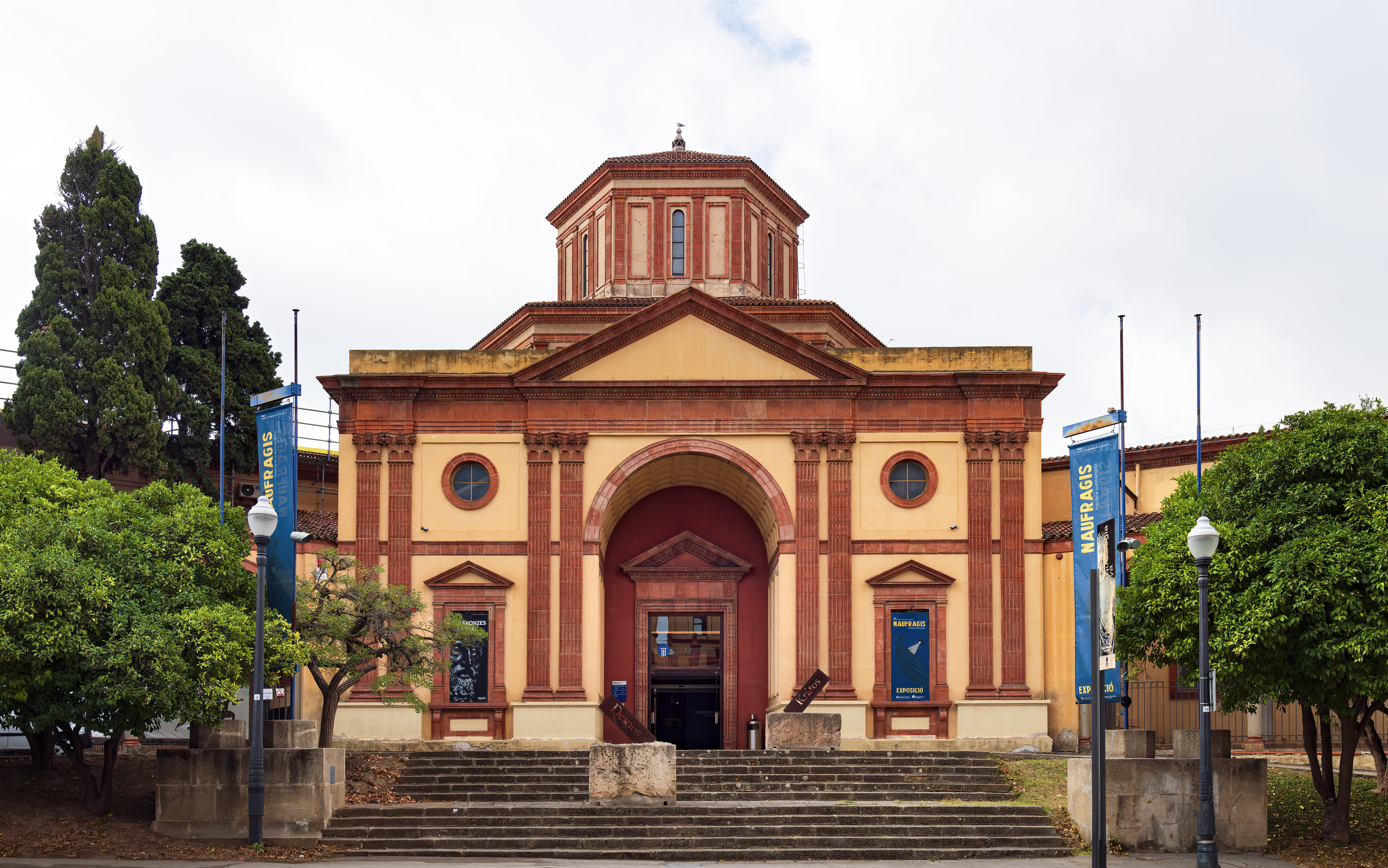
- Established: 1932; 94 years ago
- Location: Barcelona; Empúries; MAC Girona; Olèrdola; Ullastret
- Type: Archaeology museum
- Visitors: 332.107 all museums (2018)
- Director: Jusèp Boya Busquet
- Owner: Generalitat de Catalunya
- Website: www.mac.cat

The Archaeology Museum of Catalonia (Catalan: Museu d'Arqueologia de Catalunya, MAC) is an archaeological museum with five venues that exposes the most important archaeological collection of Catalonia, focusing on prehistoric times and ancient history. The museum was originally founded in 1932 by the Republican Government of Catalonia. The modern institution was created under the Museums of Catalonia Act in 1990 by the Ministry of Culture of the same Government.

The head office is located in the former Palace of Graphic Arts, which was built on the Montjuïc hill for the 1929 Barcelona International Exposition. The pavilion was initially to be dismantled once the event was over, but it was conserved and refitted by the architect Josep Gudiol before the museum opened its doors in 1932.

== Venues ==
The museum is composed by a group of five museum venues archaeological sites in several places of Catalonia:

=== MAC Barcelona ===
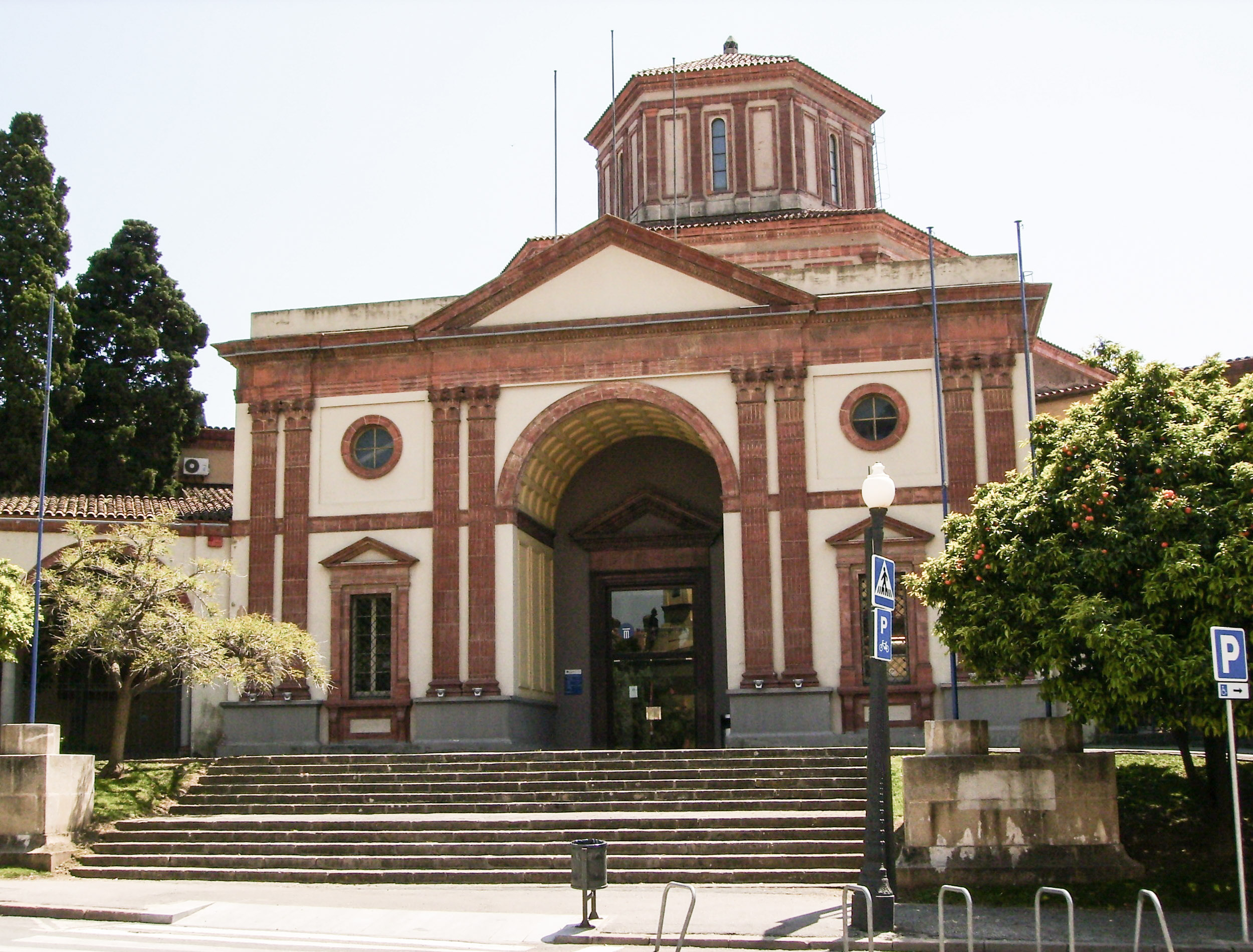
Barcelona venue (MAC Barcelona)

Officially, Museu d'Arqueologia de Barcelona i Institut de Prehistòria i Arqueologia. The museum was designed by Pelagi Martínez i Patricio, covers an area of 4,000 m^{2} and is structured into five chronological spaces: prehistory; protohistory, the Greek and Phoenician colonisations; the Roman Empire; and, finally, the Visigoths, marking the start of the medieval period. Some of the main attractions are the Greek statue of Asclepius from the 3rd century BCE which was discovered in Empúries, the Iberian Treasure of Tivissa and the votive crown from the Treasure of Torredonjimeno.

=== The Greco-Roman city of Empúries ===
The village of Sant Martí d'Empúries is on a small isthmus that has been settled since the 9th century BCE, when it was inhabited by Indigetes. The town itself was built around the 6th century BCE by Greek colonists and was later occupied by the Romans during the Punic Wars. Archaeological recovery of the site began in 1908 and 25% of the site has been excavated. In addition to the outdoor exhibits, many of the artifacts discovered here can be seen in the museum on the site.

=== MAC Girona ===
Founded in 1846 as the "Provincial Museum of Antiquities and Fine Arts", making it one of the oldest museums in Catalonia. It was relocated on several occasions until it arrived at its current location in the Benedictine monastery of Sant Pere de Galligants in 1857. It became a part of MAC in 1992.

=== The monuments of Olèrdola ===
The settlement at Olèrdola was continuously inhabited from the 8th century BCE to the time of the Reconquista. The site includes an Iron Age fortified nucleus, an Iberian settlement, a Roman fortification and a medieval town with Romanesque and pre-Romanesque churches and medieval tombs cut into the rock. It was opened to the public in November 1971 and became part of the Archaeology Museum of Catalonia in 1995.

=== The Iberian settlement of Ullastret ===
Located in the Baix Empordà, the Iberian town of Ullastret is the largest Iberian settlement discovered so far in Catalonia, with a history stretching back to the 5th Century B.C. Excavations started in 1948 and continue to this day. Visitors can walk around the ruined walls and cobbled streets of the village, as well as visit the Ullastret Monographic Museum, which is also part of the complex.

== The Submarine Archaeology Centre of Catalonia ==
Officially, Centre d'Arqueologia Subaquàtica de Catalunya (CASC) in Girona. Created in 1992 to protect underwater archeological sites and part of MAC since 1996, the centre's mission is to take inventory, protect, conserve, and study underwater heritage sites in Catalonia. In addition to its own projects, CASC provides support for external archeological teams.

== See also ==
- National Archaeological Museum of Tarragona
- List of museums in Catalonia
