= Joaquín Rubio y Muñoz =

Spanish lawyer and numismatist

Joaquín Rubio y Muñoz (27 July 1788 – 30 November 1874) was a Spanish lawyer who was a noted antiquarian and numismatist in the city of Cádiz, Spain. He built up a library of manuscripts and rare books and in particular was known for his extensive collection of ancient coins and medals, many of which are now in museums in Spain and Denmark.

== Biography ==
Joaquín Rubio was born on 27 July 1788 in the city of Cádiz, and baptised four days later in the church of San Antonio . His full baptismal name was Joaquín José María Nazario Juan Nepomuceno Rubio y Muñoz. However he seems rarely to have used the two surnames traditionally used by Spaniards, and to have preferred the simplest form of his name, Joaquín Rubio (in a few sources he is referred to as Joaquín María Rubio).

His parents had married in Cádiz Cathedral es:Catedral de Cádiz in 1774 but both came originally from other parts of Andalusia. His father, Juan Felipe Rubio Egea, was born in the city of Córdoba, Spain in 1740 and his mother, Ana Ramona Muñoz de Pedros, was born in the small hill town of Villa de Casares, Málaga province, in 1750.

By profession, Joaquín was a lawyer. He came from a family of lawyers – his father, brother and son were all also lawyers. The legal posts Joaquín held were as follows: Escribano Público de Número de Cádiz, Secretario del Juzgado de Avenencias del Distrito Consular de Cádiz and Escribano de Cámara Honorario de la Audiencia de Sevilla. Outside of the legal world of his work, he was also President of the Archaeological Deputation for the Province of Cádiz, Fellow of the [Spanish] Royal Academy of History , of the Spanish Academy of Archaeology, Fellow of the Cádiz Academy of Don Alonso the Wise and Knight of the Royal Danish Order of Dannebrog (see below).

Joaquín Rubio got married in 1823, in the church of San Lorenzo in Cádiz, to María Dolores Bosichy Pitaluga. She was a native of Cádiz, but was partly of Greek descent as her grandfather, Rodolfo Bosichi [Ρόδης Μποζίkης or Rodios Bozikis], had been born in Patras in Greece (he fled when the Turks invaded in 1715, was educated in the Greek college in Venice, and later settled in Cádiz to trade as a merchant).

Joaquín and María Dolores had two children, named after their mother and father respectively: María Dolores Rubio Bosichy and Joaquín Rubio Bosichy. The latter married María Josefa de Artecona y de Lafuente, who became Marquesa de Casa Rábago on the death of her grandmother, María Josefa Fernández de Rábago O'Ryan, a philanthropist who, as President of the Ladies' Council (Junta de Damas) in Cádiz for over thirty years, had devoted much energy to establishing free education for girls in that city .

== A passion for collecting ==
Over the course of at least forty years, Joaquín built up a major collection of coins, particularly antique coins from ancient Carthage, Greece and Rome. He also amassed a private library of rare books and manuscripts. As a result, he was in contact with scholars and collectors and was described in 1852, by the Curator of the Royal Coin and Medal collection (later the Director of the National Archaeological Museum), Basilio Sebastián Castellanos de Losada, as a “learned antiquarian and famous coin collector” [ilustrado anticuario y célebre coleccionista numismático]. In 1848 the writer Adolfo de Castro es:Adolfo de Castro refers to various very rare manuscripts, including an early 15th-century treatise on chivalry written in the Provençal language, being in the private library (described as ‘preciosísima’) of don Joaquín Rubio, ‘gran anticuario y poseedor de muchos libros y manuscritos rarísimos’ [a great antiquarian and owner of many extremely rare books and manuscripts].

Fifty letters written to Joaquín by the liberal writer, intellectual and critic Bartolomé José Gallardo es:Bartolomé José Gallardo, dealing with various literary matters, are now in the library of the Spanish Royal Academy of History and were published in a book about Gallardo by Pedro Sáinz Rodríguez in 1986. Amongst other things they refer to the publication in 1845, by the Cádiz city council [ayuntamiento], of a late 16th-century History of the City of Cádiz by Agustín Horozco with an appendix on the coins of Cádiz written by Joaquín Rubio. The letters make it clear the two men were good friends and that Gallardo also knew Joaquín’s son, Joaquín Rubio Bosichy, who was a law student in the mid-1840s at the Universidad Central, as the Complutense University of Madrid was known at that time.

== Honoured by a fellow coin collector - the Danish King ==
On 16 November 1847, at the age of 59, Joaquín Rubio was made a Knight of the Royal Danish Order of the Dannebrog [Dannebrog = Danish flag]. The reason for this award seems to be Joaquín Rubio’s co-operation with King Christian VIII of Denmark, via consular intermediaries, in agreeing to sell (or swap in some cases) duplicate rare coins from his collection which the Danish King was anxious to acquire for his own important coin collection, and which were transferred to Copenhagen in November 1847.

However, although the Royal Coin Collection at the National Museum of Denmark in Copenhagen is still the home of some of Joaquín’s coin collection, the bulk of his collection is now in the National Archaeological Museum of Spain [Museo Arqueológico Nacional] in Madrid. Over 8000 coins from the ‘Rubio collection’ were transferred there during Joaquín's own lifetime. There was interest in acquiring the collection for the Spanish nation in the 1850s, and discussion as to whether it should go to the National Museum or the Museum of the Royal Academy of History, or be split between the two. Joaquín donated a number of rare coins to the Academy's collection , but most of his coin collection (8,298 coins, including 190 gold coins – 117 of these being antique gold coins) was sold by him to the national collection in May 1858.

Joaquín had doubtless been giving thought to the future of his coin collection. There is nothing to indicate that either of his children, both married by now, shared his passion for coins. 1858 was the year he reached the age of 70, and wrote his Will, in which he explains he has already given equal and substantial sums of money to his two children at the time of their marriages. A granddaughter was born the same year of 1858 – he already had a grandson – and he must have realised it would be sensible to sort out a safe permanent home for his collection in his lifetime (he was not to know he would live another sixteen years). It must have seemed a good solution for the bulk of his collection to find a home with, and complement significantly, the best coin collection in Spain.

Joaquín's collecting did not cease with the transfer of over 8000 coins to Madrid, however. The 1871 Cádiz Guide says that Joaquín's private coin collection, ‘despite having enriched with some excellent pieces the National Museum and the Museum of the Academy of History’, continues to contain a good assortment which is ‘still increasing’! By then he was 83; he lived until 30 November 1874, dying at the age of 86, in the city in which he had spent his whole life.

== Bibliography ==
- Den spanske møntsamler Joaquín Rubio og Den kongelige Mønt- og Medaillesamling i København, by Jerome Farrell (translated into Danish by Jens Christian Moesgaard) in Nordisk Numismatisk Unions Medlemsblad no. 4, November 2007, pp. 157–161
- The Danish numismatist Christian Jürgensen Thomsen and the formation of the Ancient and Medieval Iberian collection of coins in the Danish National Museum, by Jørgen Steen Jensen in Problems of Medieval Coinage in the Iberian Area (proceedings of a symposium held by the Sociedade Numismática Scalabitana and the Instituto de Sintra), Santarém, 1988, pp 572–576
- Las Monedas de Navarra en la Colección Real de Monedas y Medallas del Museo Nacional de Dinamarca, by Jens Christian Moesgaard, in Trabajos de Arqueología Navarra no. 16, 2002-2003
- Numismatic relations between Denmark and Spain from the 18th to the 20th century, by Anne Kromann and Jørgen Steen Jensen, in Acta Numismática 21-23 (Homenatge al Dr. Leandre Villaronga), 1993, pp 49–56
- La Moneda Hispanica, by Antonio Vives y Escudero, Real Academia de la Historia, Madrid 1926, prologue page clxxxviii
- Catálogo de las Monedas Antiguas de Oro del Museo Arqueológico Nacional, by Carmen Alfaro Asins, Madrid 1993, pp 36–39
- Sylloge Nummorum Graecorum España, by Carmen Alfaro Asins, Museo Arqueológico Nacional, Madrid, 1994, pp 25, 47-48 and 163
- Tesoros del Gabinete numismático. Las 100 mejores piezas del monetario del museo arqueológico nacional, Madrid 2003, pp 26–28
- Bibliófilo y Erudito: vida y obra de Adolfo de Castro (1823-1898) by Manuel Ravina Martín, Universidad de Cádiz 1999, pp 27, 33-34, 52, 77 and 80
- El Buscapié by Adolfo de Castro, Cádiz, 1848 p 95
- Gallardo y la Crítica de su Tiempo, by Pedro Sáinz Rodríguez, Fundación Universitaria Española, Madrid 1986, pp 311–355
- Guía de Cádiz by don José Rosetty, Imprenta de la Revista Médica, Cádiz, 1871, p 143
- Glorias de Azara en el Siglo XIX by Basilio Sebastián Castellanos de Losada, Madrid 1852, p 935
- Historia de la Ciudad de Cádiz compuesta por Agustín de Horozco, Cádiz 1845 [appendix on the coinage of Cádiz by Joaquín Rubio]
