= Archaeology Museum of Catalonia (Girona) =

Archaeology museum in Santa Llúcia, Girona

Coordinates: 41.9887°N 2.8265°E

Archaeology Museum of Catalonia in Girona
- Museu d'Arqueologia de Catalunya a Girona (MAC Girona)

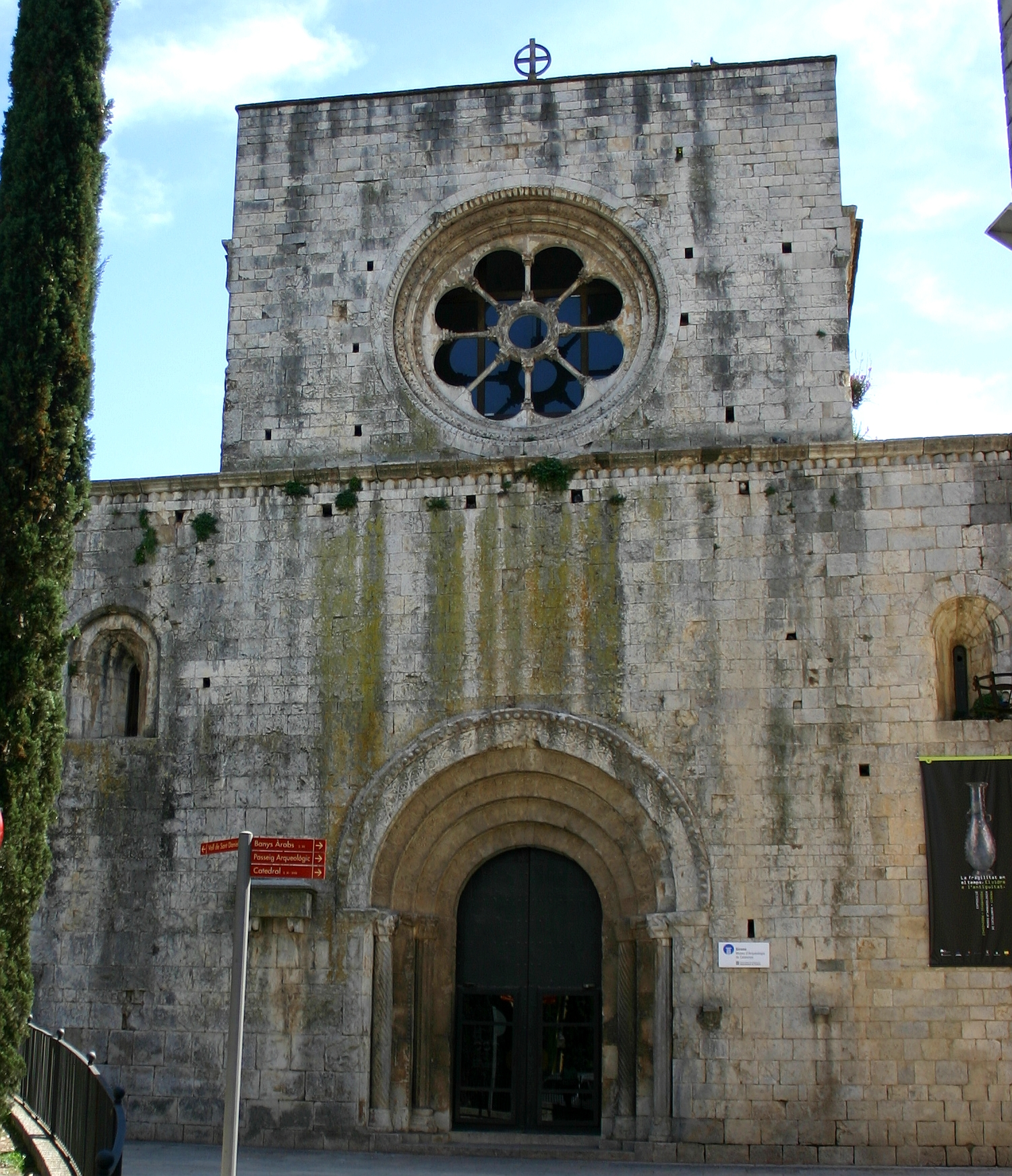
- Established: 1857; 169 years ago
- Location: Sant Pere de Galligants c/ Santa Llúcia, 8 Girona
- Type: Archaeology museum
- Visitors: 120.048 (2017)
- Director: Dr. Ramon Buxó Capdevila
- Owner: Generalitat de Catalunya
- Website: www.macgirona.cat

The Archaeology Museum of Catalonia in Girona (Catalan: Museu d'Arqueologia de Catalunya a Girona, MAC Girona) is one of the five venues of the Archaeology Museum of Catalonia, located in the Sant Pere de Galligants Benedictine abbey of Girona since its foundation in 1857. It contains materials found during archaeological excavations at various sites in the province of Girona, dating from prehistory to the Middle Ages.

The museum was founded as the Provincial Museum of Antiquities and Fine Arts in 1846 by the Provincial Monument Commission, and is therefore one of the oldest museums in Catalonia. Between 1846 and 1857 the Museum had several different locations, until Sant Pere de Galligants monastery in 1857, where it has remained until today, and where it was given the name by which it is popularly known.

== Building ==
The building where the Museum is located is a remarkable example of Catalan Romanesque architecture from the 12th century. Its foundation date is not known, but it existed already in the first half of the 10th century. In 1836 it was abandoned by the community of Benedictine monks who lived there, due to the Ecclesiastical Confiscations of Mendizábal. Today, the Museum occupies the cloister and the Romanesque church, as well as the area above the cloister, built in the second half of the 19th century. Since 1992 the Museum has been part of the Archaeology Museum of Catalonia, run by the Catalan Cultural Heritage Agency.

== Former staff ==
- María Luz Navarro Mayor, former director (1944-1947)
