= Aloi de Montbrai =

French sculptor

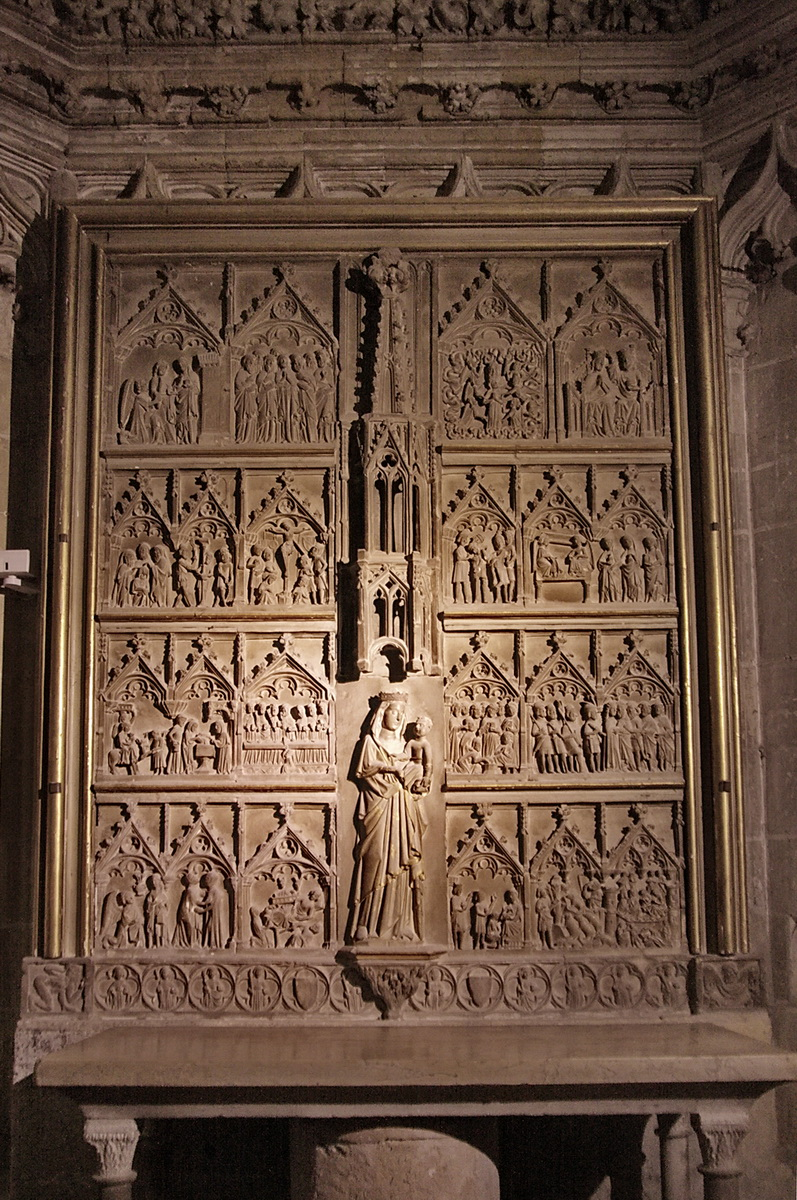
Retablo in the Santa Maria dels Sastres Chapel in the Cathedral of Tarragona.

Aloi de Montbrai was a 14th-century Catalan sculptor of French (perhaps Norman) origin.

He is documented in Catalonia in the years between 1337 and 1368, working for the royal court of the Crown of Aragon. In 1337 he received from Peter IV of Aragon the commission of a sepulchre for the king's mother, Teresa d'Entença; later he executed the 19 sculptures of the counts and kings in the Palau Reial Major of Barcelona, as well as a royal pantheon in the Monastery of Poblet, which Aloi executed together with Jaume Cascalls.

Aloi de Montbrai's other works include the Sepulchre of St. Daniel in the Monastery of San Daniel (Girona) and sculptures in the Tarragona and Girona Cathedrals.

== Bibliography ==
- La Gran Enciclopèdia en català (in Catalan). Vol. 1. Barcelona: Edicions 62. 2004. ISBN 84-297-5429-6.
