= Church of St. Mary, Corneilla-de-Conflent =

Church located in Pyrénées-Orientales, France

Coordinates: 42°33′59″N 2°22′59″E

Church of St. Mary
- Église Sainte-Marie de Corneilla-de-Conflent
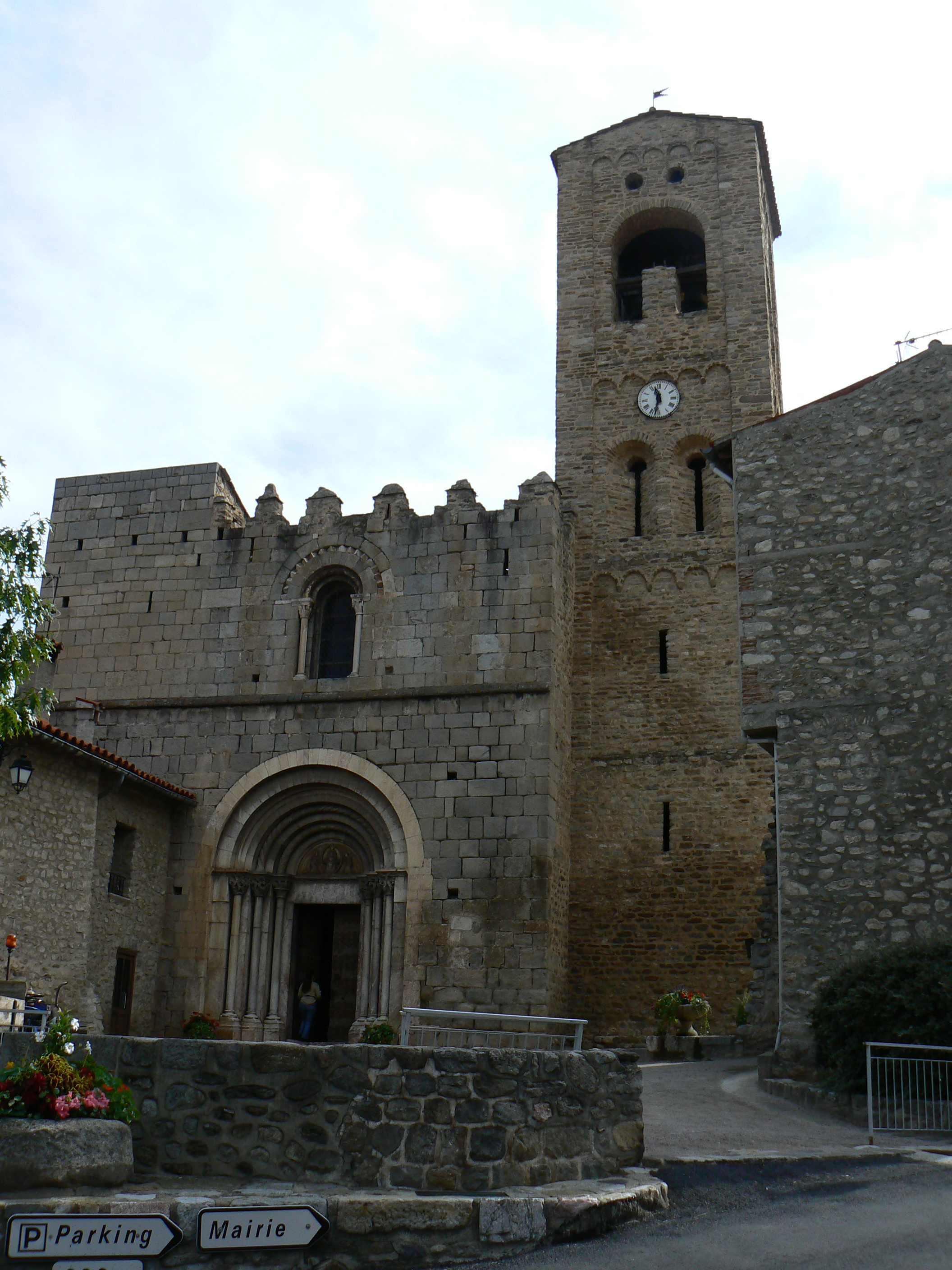
- Western façade

Religion
- Affiliation: Roman Catholic
- Diocese: Roman Catholic Diocese of Perpignan-Elne
- Region: Languedoc-Roussillon
- Status: Active

Location
- Location: Corneilla-de-Conflent, France
- Interactive map of Church of St. Mary

Architecture
- Type: Church
- Style: Romanesque
- Groundbreaking: 11th century
- Completed: 12th century (chapel added in the 14th century)
- Direction of façade: West
- Designated as NHL: Monument historique (1840)

St. Mary is a church in Corneilla-de-Conflent, southern France. Built in the 11th-12th centuries, in Romanesque style, it was originally an Augustinian monastery. It was declared a national monument in 1840.

== History ==
Mentioned for the first time in 1018, the church, owned by the bishops of Elne, was acquired by Count Wilfred II of Cerdanya, who made their capital in the town, in 1025. In 1094, Count William I ordered the construction of a monastery here, which was founded in 1097 and entrusted to the Augustinians.

Until 1167, the priory acquired numerous privileges and possessions, including castles and villages. In 1356, King Peter III of Aragon ceded to the monks the old palace of the counts.

In the 14th century, the church was fortified with a line of walls featuring pyramidal merlons. The priory continued to increase in importance until its secularization in 1592. After the French Revolution in 1789, it was repeatedly modified.

== Architecture ==
The church, in Romanesque style, has a façade in pink marble, surmounted by a tympanum decorated by a Madonna enthroned with Child and Angels. The columns supporting the archivolts have capitals with rampaging lions, palms and sheep.

The circular apse features exterior Lombard bands and a sawtooth-shaped frieze, as well as three windows with archivolts over small columns.

The interior is on a nave and two aisles. It houses a retablo by Jaume Cascalls (1345). The bell tower is in Lombard Romanesque style; it has Lombard bands decorating each of the three stories, the middle one having two windows and the upper one a large arch.

== Photographs ==
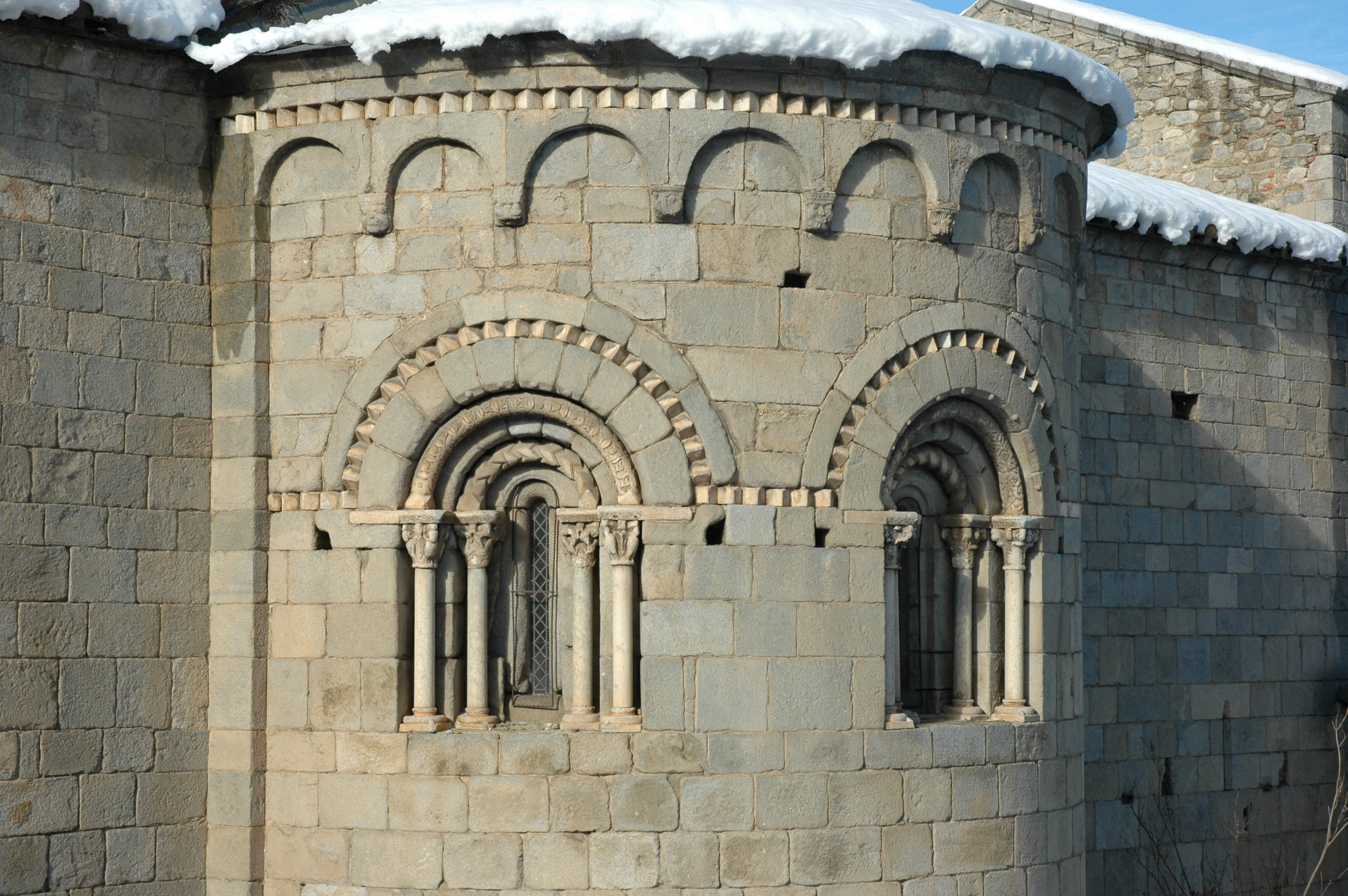
Detail of the apse

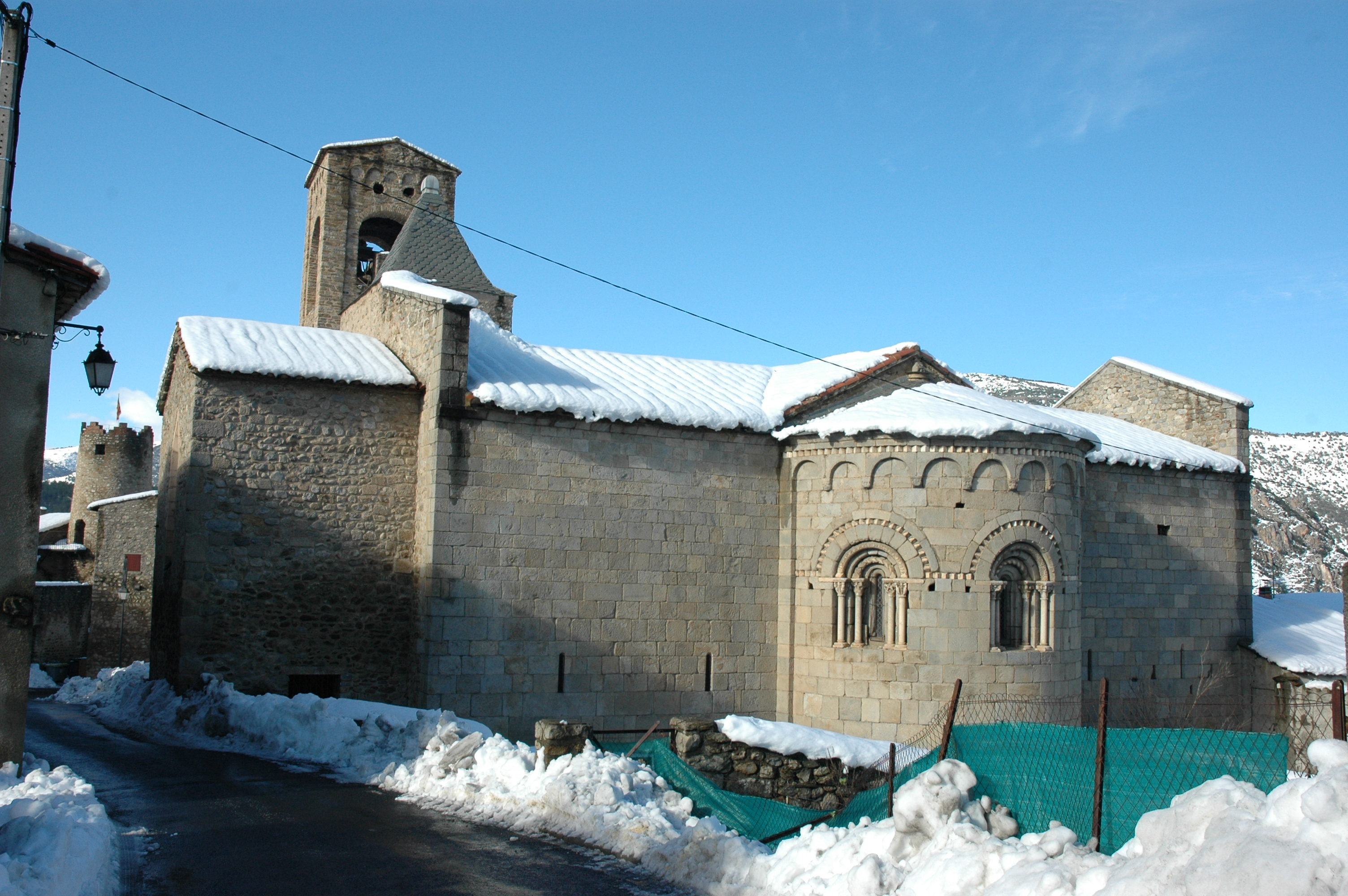
Chevet

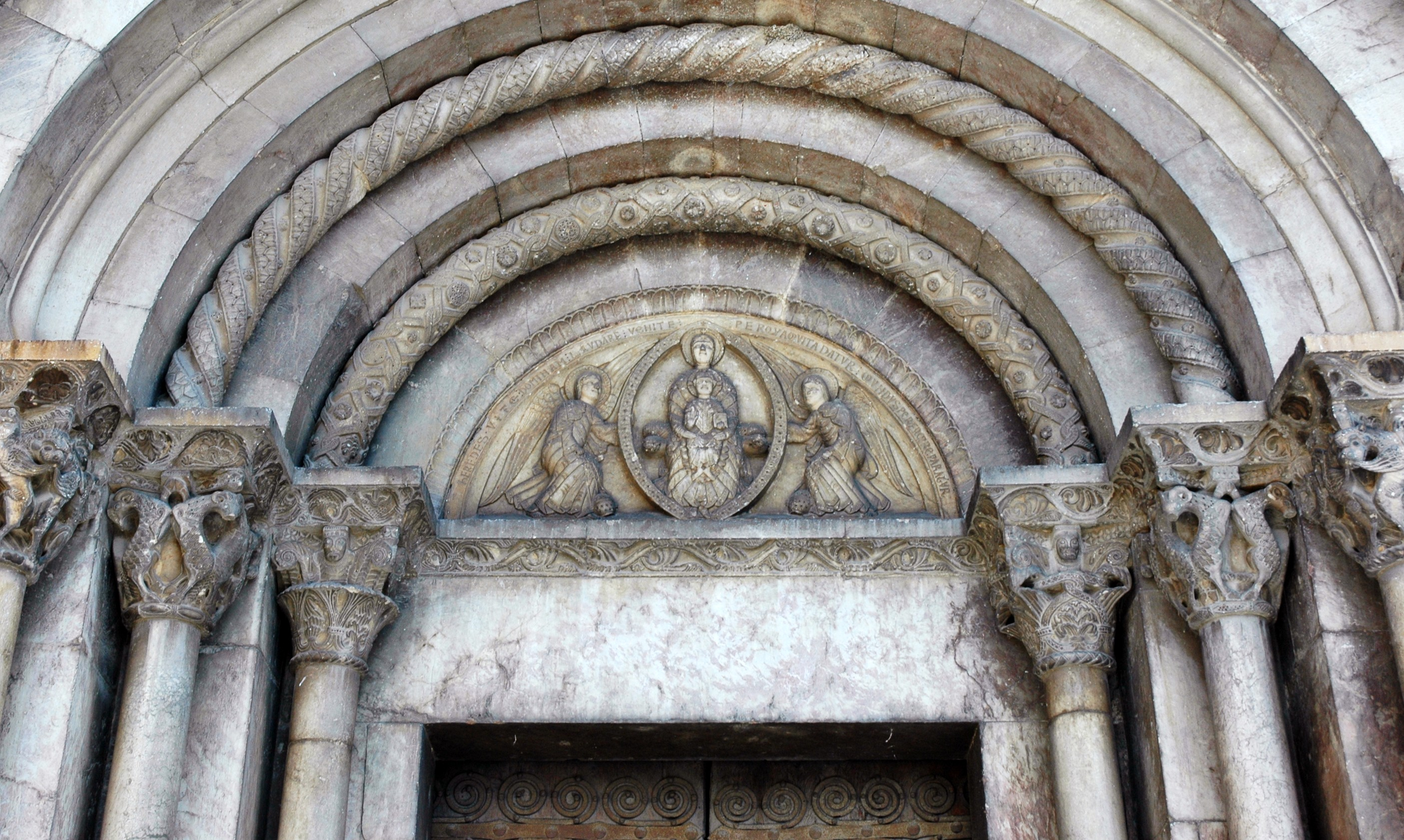
Western portal

== Sources ==
- Carabasa, Lluïsa; Antoni Pladevall (2001). Guies Catalunya Romànica. El Conflent. Barcelona: Pòrtic. ISBN 84-7306-691-X.
