= Monastery of Sant Daniel, Girona =

Religious complex in Girona, Catalonia, northern Spain

Coordinates: 41°59′18″N 2°50′00″E

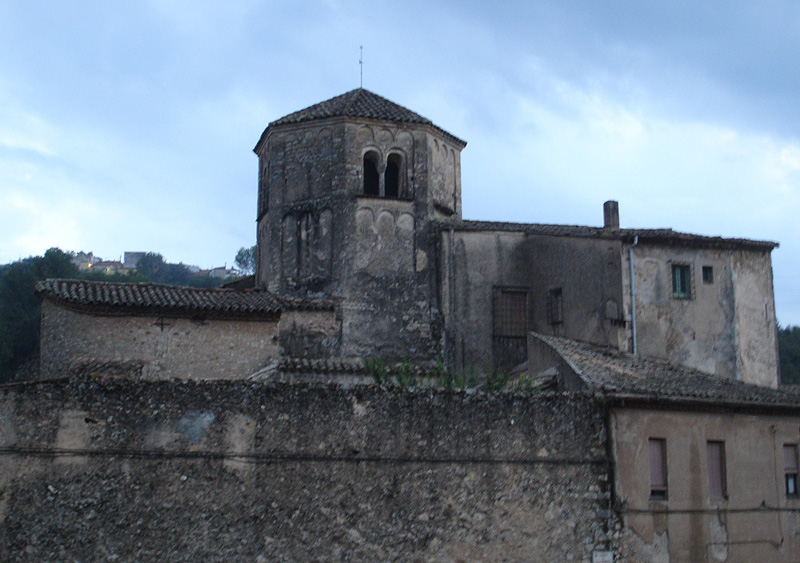
Monastery of San Daniel.

The Monastery of San Daniel (Catalan: Monestir de Sant Daniel) is a religious complex in Girona, Catalonia, northern Spain.

It was founded in the early 11th century by will of countess Ermesinde of Carcassonne, who wanted to found a nunnery here. The church, based on that of the monastery of Sant Pere de Galligants, with the addition of a transept, was later renewed. It has a cloister with two floors, the lower from the 13th century (with Romanesque decorations) and the upper, in Gothic style, from the 15th century. It has double columns with Corinthian capitals.

Artworks include the sepulchre of St. Daniel, whose remains, according to the tradition, were brought here from Arles. It dates to 1345 and was executed by sculptor Aloi de Montbrai.

== Sources ==
- Pladevall, Antonio (1970). Els monestirs catalanas (in Catalan). Barcelona: Ediciones Destino.
