= Jordi de Déu =

Spanish artist

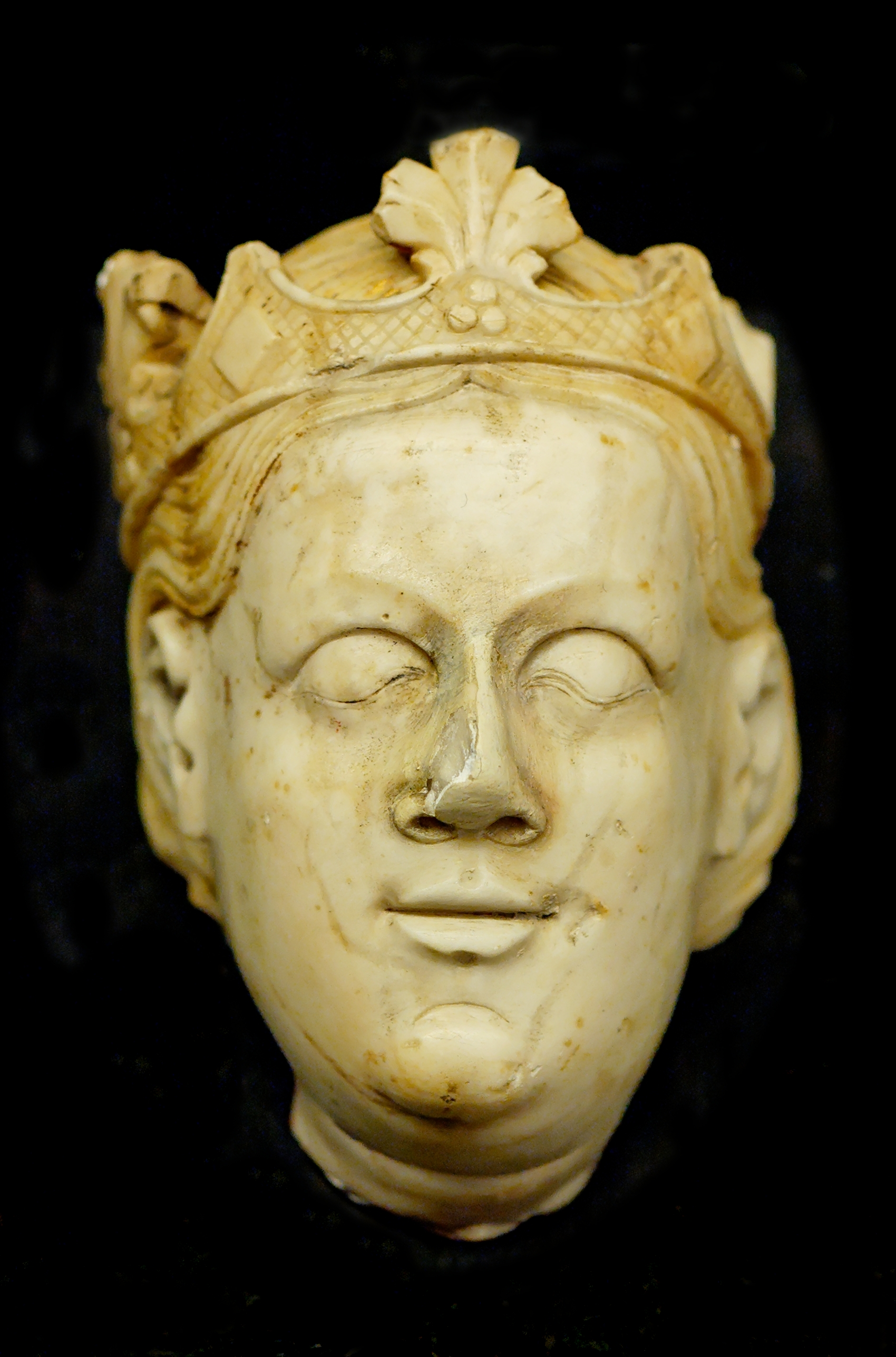
Fragment from the royal Pantheon for the Monastery of Poblet.

Jordi de Déu (later Jordi Johan; died c. 1418) was a Catalan Gothic sculptor of Greek origin, born in Messina.

He was bought as a slave in Barcelona by the sculptor Jaume Cascalls, who taught him sculpture. The first mentions of Jordi working alongside his master, on the royal tombs in Poblet Monastery date to 1363. He also collaborated on the apostles statues for the portal of the Cathedral of Tarragona (1370–1377).

After Cascall's death, King Peter IV of Aragon named him director of the works on the royal tombs (1381). In 1385 he executed a retable in Vallfogona de Riucorb and, the following year, an alabaster retable of St. Lawrence for the church of Santa Coloma de Queralt. In Barcelona, bishop Ramon d'Escales commissioned sculptures from him for the choir of the city's Cathedral, as well as other works in the same church. Later he received a commission for fifty capitals in the Monastery of Santa María de Ripoll.

He later worked on the Gothic decoration of Barcelona's Town Hall.

His sons Antonio and Pere Johan were both sculptors.

== Sources ==
- Beseran i Ramon, Pere (2003). Jordi de Déu i l'italianisme en l'escultura catalana del segle XIV, Tarragona. Diputación de Tarragona. ISBN 84-88618-97-2.
