= María Luz Navarro Mayor =

Spanish curator

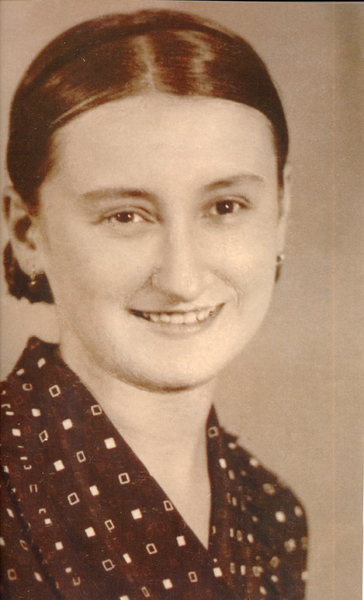
- Born: April 8, 1918; Soria
- Died: April 14, 2014 (aged 96)
- Occupations: Numismatist, curator
- Employer: National Archaeological Museum (Madrid)

María Luz Navarro Mayor (8 April 1918 – 2014) was a Spanish museum curator and numismatist, who was Director of Numismatics at the National Archaeological Museum. She was previously director of the Archaeological Museum of Girona and is seen as an example of a woman succeeding in archaeology in Franco-era Spain, despite the societal barriers she faced,

== Biography ==
Born in the city of Soria on 8 April 1918, her parents were Higinio Navarro, an industrialist, and Ángela Mayor, a teacher. She enrolled at the Soria Institute and obtained her high school diploma in 1933. She moved to Madrid to begin her university studies in 1932 at the Faculty of Philosophy and Letters, specializing in Ancient History, at the Complutense University of Madrid. However, she had to interrupt her university studies during the Spanish Civil War, yet completed her degree in 1940.

In 1944 Navarro passed the competitive examination to become an officially qualified Latin teacher. The same year she was appointed director of the Archaeological Museum of Girona, a position in which she remained until 1947 when she married and was forced to temporarily leave the profession.

In 1965, she rejoined the National Archaeological Museum, where she held a range of curatorial positions across a range of departments, lastly from 1978 as head of the Numismatic Department, in which she collaborated with various professionals such as Carmen Alfaro Asins and Octavio Gil Farrés. In her tenure as department lead, the museum developed a new facility for the study of the collection.

She retired in 1986 and died in Madrid on 14 April 2014.

== Legacy ==
In 2020, Navarro's life was included in the project Women Researchers in State Archives (1900-1970). This project highlighted the research work carried out in Spain by women in the period 1900-1970 based on the documentary records that are preserved in the Management Archives of the State Archives of the Ministry of Culture. She is seen as an example of a woman succeeding in archaeology in Franco-era Spain, despite societal barriers.
