= Carmen Alfaro Asins =

Spanish archaeologist and numismatist (1952–2005)

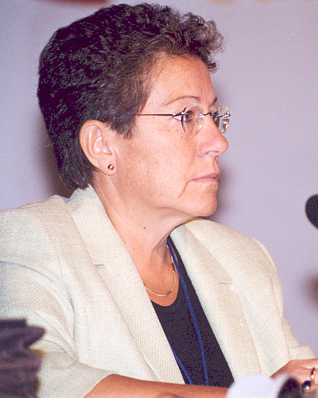
- Asins in 2003
- Born: 8 May 1952; Madrid, Spain
- Died: 9 June 2005 (aged 53); Madrid, Spain
- Occupations: Numismatist, curator
- Employer: National Archaeological Museum (Madrid)
- Awards: 1992: Presidential Medal of the Spanish Numismatic Association 1994: Javier Conde Garriga Award of the Spanish Numismatic Association 2003: Xavier Calicó Prize of the Spanish Association of Professional Numismatists

Academic background
- Education: Autonomous University of Madrid
- Thesis: Las monedas de Gadir/Gades (1983)
- Doctoral advisor: Gratiniano Nieto

Carmen Alfaro Asins (8 May 1952 – 9 June 2005) was a Spanish archaeologist, numismatist and curator. She was head curator of the Numismatics Department at the National Archaeological Museum in Spain, where her research focused on Phoenician-Punic coinage. She was awarded the President's Medal and the Javier Conde Garriga Prize by the Spanish Numismatic Association in 1994, and the Xavier Calicó Prize by the Spanish Association of Professional Numismatists in 2003. The proceedings of the XIII International Numismatic Congress were dedicated to her.

== Biography ==
Born in Madrid on 8 May 1952, Alfaro obtained her degree in Prehistory and Archaeology in 1977 from the Autonomous University of Madrid. She was awarded her PhD from the same institution in 1983 for a thesis entitled The Coins of Gadir/Gades. Published subsequently as La monedas de Gadir, reviews described it as a valuable contribution. In 1984 she joined the Numismatics Section of the National Archaeological Museum as a curator. By 1989, she was the Head of the Numismatics and Medals Department, replacing María Luz Navarro Mayor.

When Alfaro took up the leadership of the Numismatics Department, it had been to some extent dormant since the Second World War. She focused on sharing the collections widely, both with academic researchers through publications and through exhibitions to showcase the collections to the public. In her outreach efforts, she encouraged the loan of objects. She also organized events to revitalize the department's presence in national and international numsimatic circles. A prime example of this is the XIII International Numismatic Congress, which was held in Madrid from 15 to 19 September 2003; she also prepared the Congress Proceedings, which she did not live to see published. Nevertheless these proceedings were dedicated in her honour.

As a researcher, she focused her attention on numismatics in antiquity, especially on Phoenician-Punic coinage. An early publication was the Catálogo de las monedas antiguas de oro del Museo Arqueológico Nacional, which recorded the gold coins of the collection with a chapter focusing on the confiscation of these objects in 1936 during the Spanish Civil War. She published two volumes on Hispanic coinage in the Sylloge Nummorum Graecorum, ensuring that Spanish collections were included in an international research project. Her approach to research was described by Lázaro Barrios as marked by rigor and expertise.

Alfaro's most significant contributions to numismatics involved resolving the longstanding question of the provenance of certain Punic coins. Her analysis of copper coins found by Luis Siret during his excavations at Villaricos showed that the coins had Neo-Punic place-names, pointing to the existence of a previously unknown mint in what was then known as the Phoenician colony of Tagilit. She associated the "TGL YT" mark on the coins with a historic settlement known as res publica Tagilitana, which she found mentioned on an 2nd-century tablet discovered in Tíjola.

The similarity of the different place-names over time also contributed to her finding. This allowed Alfaro to identify the mint of Tagilit on a hill named La Muela del Ajo near the Almanzora River, at one time a major Punic city from the 6th–3rd centuries BC. Further, Alfaro demonstrated that coins from the mints of Tagilit and Baria featured iconography that could be interpreted as the goddess Isis. In the Tagilit series specifically, the reverse of the largest-denomination coin depicts what could be interpreted as the throne of Isis, the hieroglyphic symbol of Isis's name. The obverse shows a female head, interpreted as either Tanit or a syncretic Isis-Hathor. Before her research, scholars interpreted the symbol on the reverse as any number of items, such as a cippus, knife, or anvil, among others.

Other major research includes her study of a Carthaginian coin hoard from the archeological site of La Torre de Doña Blanca, a Phoenician-Punic settlement in present-day El Puerto de Santa María. Her analysis made it possible to determine when the site fell into ruin and was vacated, placing it within the period of the Second Punic War.

Elected to the Ibero-American Society of Numismatic Studies (SIAEN) in 1989, Alfaro was also a member of the board of the International Numismatic Council and was its vice-president from 2003. She died on 9 June 2005.

== Awards ==
- Presidential Medal (1992) of the Spanish Numismatic Association
- Javier Conde Garriga Award (1994) of the Spanish Numismatic Association
- Xavier Calicó Prize (2003), awarded by the Spanish Association of Professional Numismatists

== Selected works ==
Catalogues

- Sylloge Nummorum Graecorum España. Vol. I, Hispania: Ciudades Feno-púnicas. Parte 2: Acuñaciones cartaginesas en Iberia y emisiones ciudadanas (2004)
- Sylloge Nummorum Graecorum España. Vol. I, Hispania: Ciudades Feno-púnicas. Parte 1: Gadir y Ebusus (1994)

Exhibitions

- Money, More Than Just Currency (Leganés, 1996)
- Treasures of the Numismatic Cabinet. The Hundred Best Pieces of the National Archaeological Museum's Monetary Collection (Madrid, 1999)
- Exotic Money. A New Collection of the National Archaeological Museum (Madrid, 2001)
- This Is Money: From the Drachma to the Euro (La Coruña, 2001)

Publications

- Alfaro Asins, Carmen (1993). "Lote de monedas cartaginesas procedentes del dragado del puerto de Melilla". NVMISMA. 232: 9–56.
- Alfaro Asins, Carmen (1993). "Tagilit, nueva ceca púnica en la provincia de Almería". Acta Numismàtica. 21–23. Barcelona: 133–146.
- Alfaro Asins, Carmen (1993). "Monedas cartaginesas y norteafricanas halladas en Ampurias". Huelva Arqueológica. XIII, 2: 175–201).
- Alfaro Asins, Carmen (2000) [1995]. "Nuevos datos sobre la ceca púnica de Tagilit (Tíjola, Almería)". Actas del IV Congreso Internacional de Estudios Fenicios y Púnicos. Cádiz: 433–438.
- Alfaro Asins, Carmen (2000). "Consideraciones sobre la moneda púnica foránea en la península Ibérica y su entorno". Boletín del Museo Arqueológico Nacional. XVIII: 21–67.
- Alfaro Asins, Carmen (2002). "La moneda púnica foránea en la península Ibérica y su entorno". Actas del Congreso Nacional de Numismática (Albacete 1998). Madrid: 1–48.
