= Sant Pere de Galligants =

Benedictine abbey in Girona, Catalonia

Coordinates: 41°59′20″N 2°49′35″E

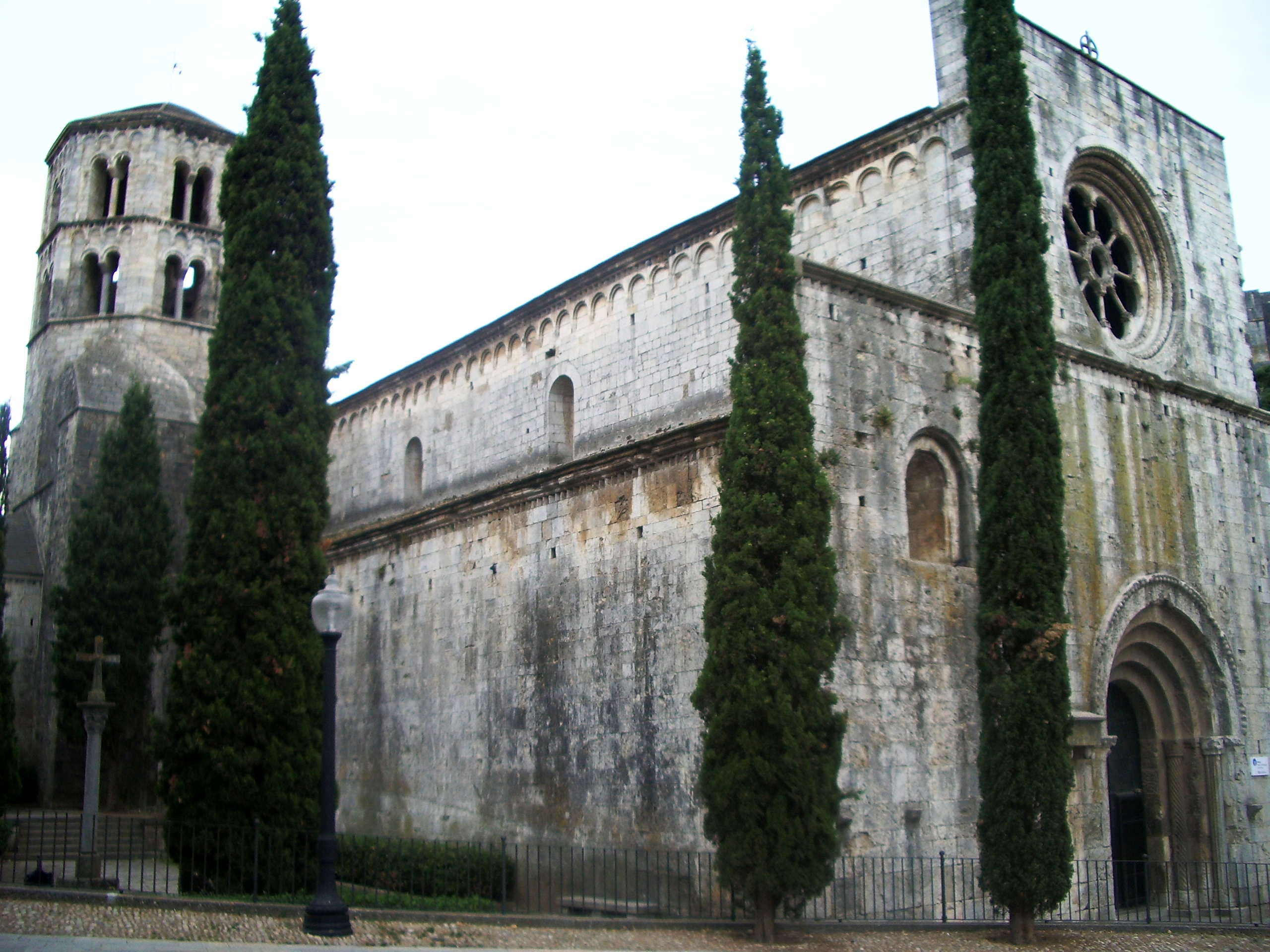
Sant Pere de Galligants.

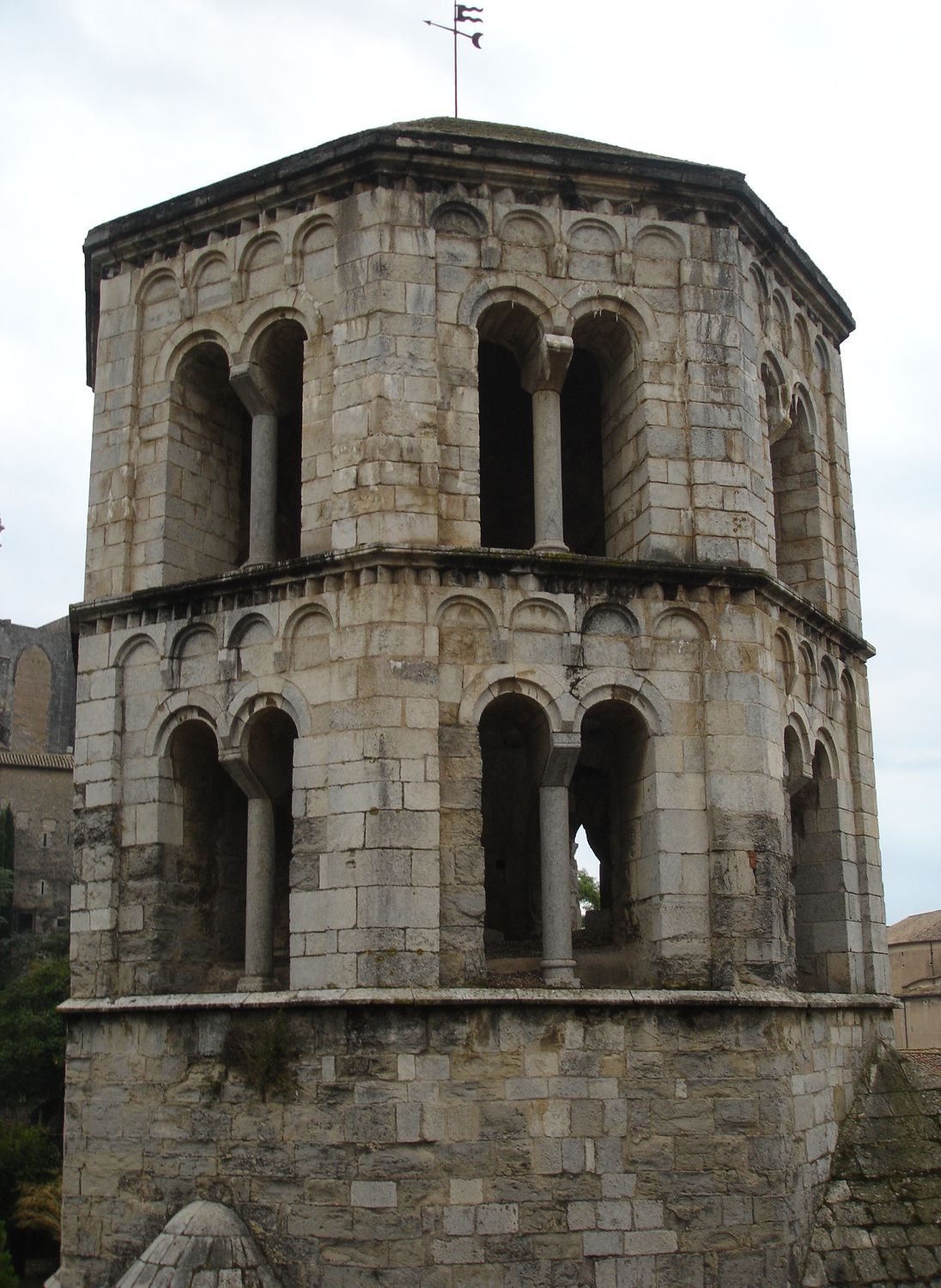
Detail of the bell tower.

Sant Pere de Galligants is Benedictine abbey in Girona, Catalonia, Spain. Since 1857, it is home to the Archaeology Museum of Catalonia venue in the city. The name translates to English as "Saint Peter of Galligants", where Galligants refers to the River Galligants that runs past the abbey.

== History ==
The monastery was built in 992 outside the walls of Girona, when Ramon Borrell, the count of Barcelona, gave the monks rights over the quarter of Sant Pere. The monks ruled the quarter until 1339, when King Peter IV of Aragon restored it to the Crown of Aragon.

In 1117, Ramon Berenguer III, Count of Barcelona united the monastery to Lagrasse Abbey in Northern Catalonia (now part of France). However, Sant Pere kept his own abbey and a significant degree of autonomy.

Sant Pere was never a big community, and the church was not the local parish church; only baptisms were held there. In 1362, when the monastery was enclosed within the city's walls, it was redesigned into a more defensive shape. It started to decay in the 15th century, and in 1592 it was united to the also decaying monasteries of Sant Miquel de Cruïlles and Sant Miquel de Fluvià. In 1835, the monastery included an abbot and four monks. It was declared a national monument in 1931.

The small cloister is an example of Catalan Romanesque architecture. The northern gallery dates to 1154, while the remaining are from 1190. The capitals of the columns have motifs very similar to those in the cloisters of Sant Cugat del Vallès or the Girona Cathedral. Some depict scenes from the life of Jesus, while others show typical Romanesque elements such as lions or medieval-style sirens.

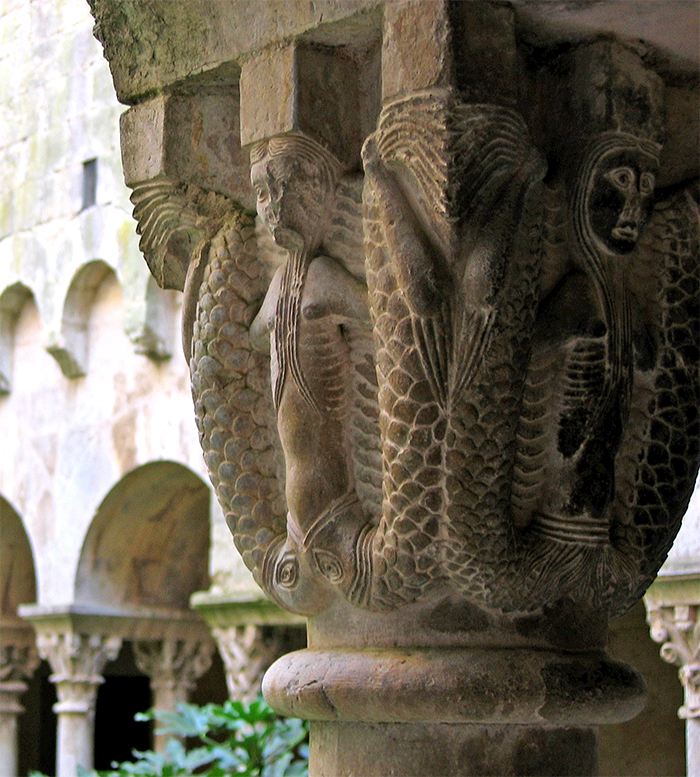
Detail of a capital in the cloister showing medieval-style sirens.

== Overview ==
The Romanesque church was built in 1130, and has a nave and two aisles with a transept, and four apses. The portal, in a rather archaic style, comes probably from a previous building. It is surmounted by a rose window with a diameter of 3.5 meters.

The interior features a series of side columns, with capitals having vegetable motifs, used to reinforce the central vault. The capitals of the apse columns are more elaborated, and were probably executed by different artists. Some of them have been attributed to the Master of Cabestany.

The bell tower has an octagonal plan and two sectors, the upper one, of two floors featuring with double arches divided by columns, decorated with Lombard bands.

== See also ==
- Monastery of Sant Daniel, Girona

== Sources ==
- Pladevall, Antoni (1999). Guies Catalunya Romànica. Barcelona-Pòrtic: El Gironès. ISBN 84-412-0229-X.
