= Jaume Cascalls =

Spanish sculptor

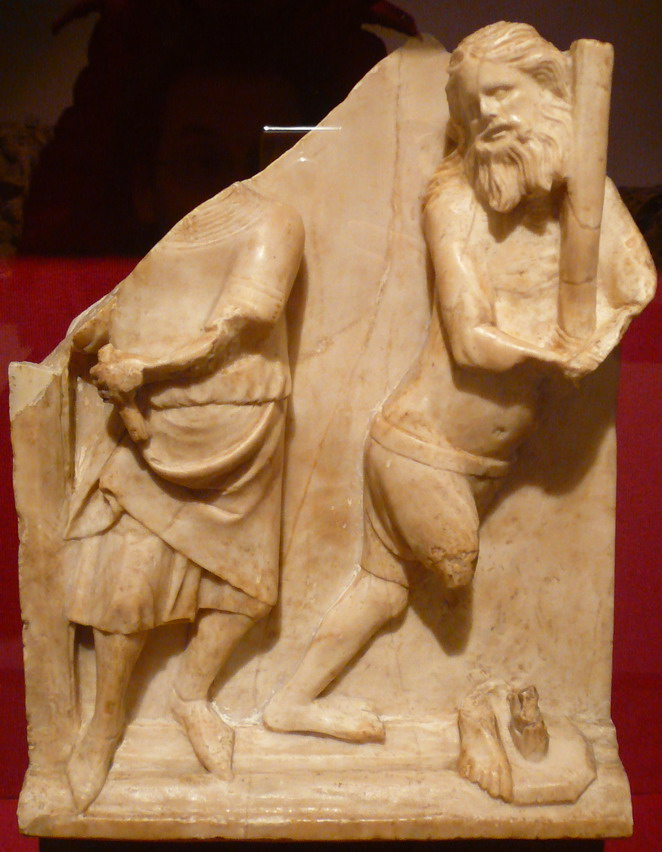
Fragment of the altarpiece of the church of St. Mary, Corneilla-de-Conflent.

Jaume Cascalls (early 14th century – 1378) was a Catalan sculptor, born in Berga. He was a representative of the Catalan school of Gothic sculpture. He was married to the daughter of painter Ferrer Bassa, with whom he had a profitable work relationship.

Cascalls' oldest known work is a white marble altarpiece in the church of St. Mary at Corneilla-de-Conflent (in what is now southern France), dated and signed 1345. His most extensive work was however a series of sepulchres in the Monastery of Poblet, where he started to work in 1349 along with the master Aloi de Montbrai; the work prolonged for many years due to the numerous modifications required by King Peter I of Aragon.

Cascalls left Poblet when he was appointed director of the construction of the La Seu Vella cathedral in Lleida (1360). he also executed several polychrome marble figures for the Ripoll Monastery and sculptures for the Cathedral of Girona, including the so-called "St. Charlemagne", a polychrome marble which in fact represents Peter I of Aragon.

In the 1370s Cascalls moved to the Cathedral of Tarragona, but he had to return to Poblet three years later, when the King menaced to deprive him of all his assets. He most likely died in 1378, after which the construction of the royal tombs begun by Cascalls at Poblet was assigned to his disciple Jordi de Déu.

== Sources ==
- Alcoy i Pere Beseran i Ramon, Rosa (1990). "La fortuna de Cascalls en el context gironí". Estudi General (10): 93–118.
