= Corneilla-de-Conflent =

Corneilla-de-Conflent Cornellà de Conflent
- Commune
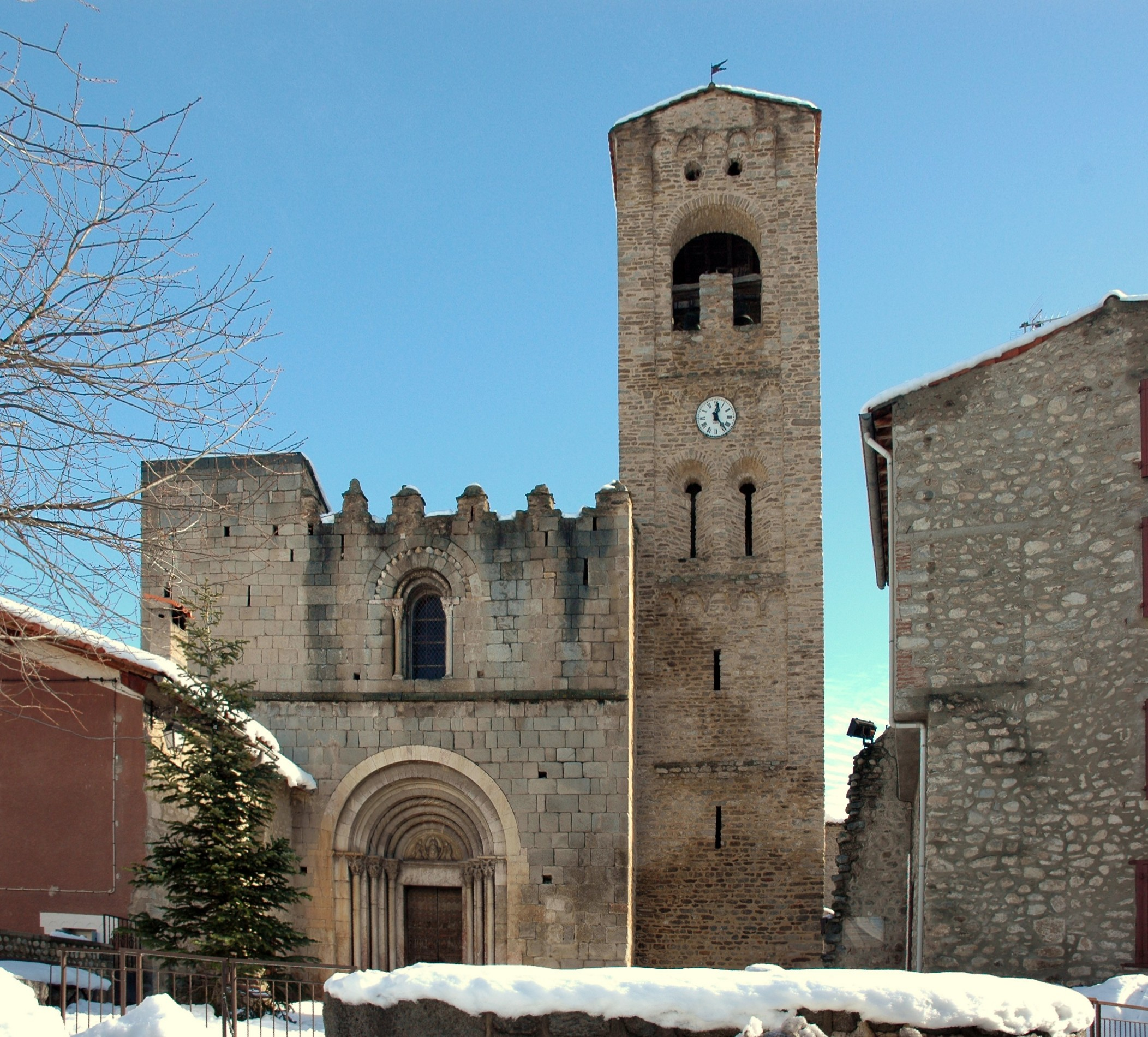
- The church of Sainte-Marie, in Corneilla-de-Conflent
- Location of Corneilla-de-Conflent
- Location within France Location within Occitanie
- Coordinates: 42°34′03″N 2°22′53″E
- Country: France
- Region: Occitania
- Department: Pyrénées-Orientales
- Arrondissement: Prades
- Canton: Le Canigou

Government
  - Mayor (2020–2026): Patrice Arro
- Area^{1}: 11.02 km^{2} (4.25 sq mi)
- Elevation: 634 m (2,080 ft)
- Highest elevation: 823 m (2,700 ft)
- Lowest elevation: 397 m (1,302 ft)
- Population (2023): 527
  - Density: 47.8/km^{2} (124/sq mi)
- Time zone: UTC+01:00 (CET)
  - Summer (DST): UTC+02:00 (CEST)
- INSEE/Postal code: 66057 /66820
- ^{1} French Land Register data, which excludes lakes, ponds, glaciers > 1 km^{2} (0.386 sq mi or 247 acres) and river estuaries.

Corneilla-de-Conflent (French pronunciation: [kɔʁnɛja də kɔ̃flɑ̃], Corneilla of Conflent; Catalan: Cornellà de Conflent) is a commune in the Pyrénées-Orientales department in southern France.

== Geography ==
=== Localisation ===
Corneilla-de-Conflent is located in the canton of Le Canigou and in the arrondissement of Prades.

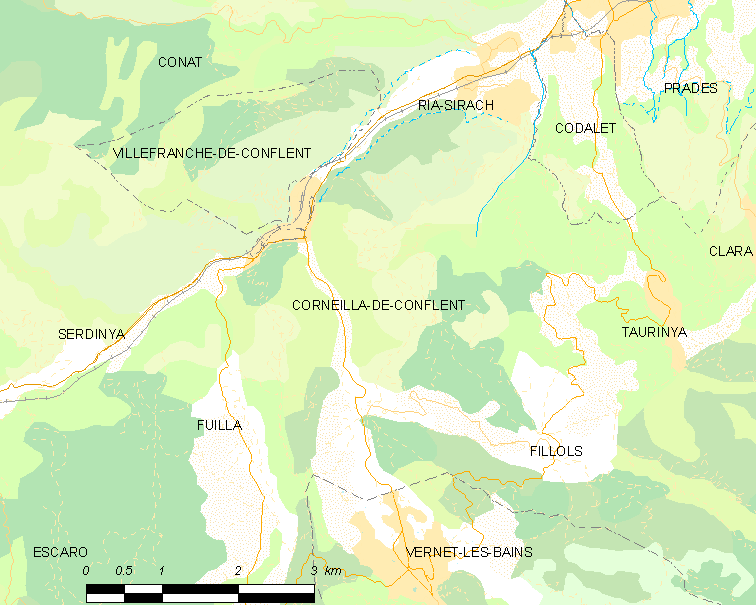
Map of Corneilla-de-Conflent and its surrounding communes

== Population ==
Historical population
Year	Pop.	±% p.a.
1968	398	—
1975	365	−1.23%
1982	397	+1.21%
1990	417	+0.62%
1999	426	+0.24%
2007	466	+1.13%
2012	465	−0.04%
2017	490	+1.05%
2023	527	+1.22%
Source: INSEE

== Sites of interest ==
It is home to the church of Saint Mary, an 11th-12th century Romanesque building.

== See also ==
- Communes of the Pyrénées-Orientales department
