= 1941 in Spain =

- Decades: 1920s; 1930s; 1940s; 1950s; 1960s
- See also: History of Spain; Timeline of Spanish history; List of years in Spain

Events in the year 1941 in Spain.

== Incumbents ==
- Caudillo: Francisco Franco

== Events ==
- February 15-16 - a fire in the city of Santander (Cantabria) in 1941, which destroyed most of the medieval town.

== Establishments ==
- Institut Marques
- Instituto Nacional de Industria

== Births ==
- January 13 – Pasqual Maragall, politician.
- January 21 – Plácido Domingo, opera singer
- January 30 - Francisco Arias Solís, politician.
- February 8 - Elena Santiago, writer. (d. 2021)
- March 5 - José Luis Arilla, tennis player.
- March 28 - Nolasc Acarín Tusell, medical doctor
- June 10 – José Antonio Ardanza, politician. (d. 2024)
- June 18 – María Teresa Campos, journalist and television presenter. (d. 2023)
- November 18 – Marta Pessarrodona, poet, literary critic, essayist, biographer.

== Deaths ==
- February 28 - Alfonso XIII of Spain, former King of Spain (d. 1886)

== See also ==
- List of Spanish films of the 1940s
