= 1942 in Spain =

- Decades: 1920s; 1930s; 1940s; 1950s; 1960s
- See also: History of Spain; Timeline of Spanish history; List of years in Spain

Events in the year 1942 in Spain.

== Incumbents ==
- Caudillo: Francisco Franco

== Events ==
- August 16 - Begoña Bombing

== Births ==
- January 2 - Jesús Glaría, footballer. (died 1978)
- February 4 - Joaquim Rifé, footballer.
- February 9 - Manuel Castells, sociologist.
- February 23 – Rogelio Baón, politician (died 2008)
- February 28 - Bernardo Adam Ferrero, composer (died 2022)
- May 29 – Óscar Alzaga, jurist and politician
- June 1 - Paco Peña, flamenco composer and guitarist
- December 2 - Vicente López Carril, racing cyclist. (died 1980)
- December 14 - Juan Diego, actor. (died 2022)

=== Undated ===
- Trinidad Falcés (died 2022), transgender activist
- Fernando Martínez Castellano (died 2024), politician
- Luis Rodríguez Zúñiga (died 1991), sociologist

== Deaths ==
- April 26 - Romà Forns.
- June 8 - José Pellicer Gandía. (born 1912)
- Undated
  - Agustín Olguera, painter (born 1906)

== See also ==
- List of Spanish films of the 1940s
