= 1957 in Spain =

- Decades: 1930s; 1940s; 1950s; 1960s; 1970s
- See also: History of Spain; Timeline of Spanish history; List of years in Spain

Events in the year 1957 in Spain.

== Incumbents ==
- Caudillo: Francisco Franco

== Births ==
- March 28 – Inés Ayala, politician (d. 2024)
- April 6 – Manuel Cervantes, footballer
- August 6 – Salvador Garriga Polledo, politician
- September 6 – Mario Lloret, swimmer
- September 25 – Alfredo Sánchez Monteseirín, politician (d. 2026)
- November 15 – Jesús Fuentes, swimmer

== Deaths ==
- March 29 – María Josefa Segovia Morón, Spanish Roman Catholic laywoman and venerable (b. 1891)
- April 8 – Pedro Segura y Sáenz, Spanish Roman Catholic archbishop (b. 1880)
- December 31 – Óscar Domínguez, Spanish painter (b. 1906)

== See also ==
- List of Spanish films of 1957
