= 1966 in Spain =

- Decades: 1940s; 1950s; 1960s; 1970s; 1980s
- See also: Other events of 1966; List of years in Spain

Events in the year 1966 in Spain.

== Events ==
- January 4 – The last victim of the del Águila family killings, Andrés, dies.

== Incumbents ==
- Caudillo: Francisco Franco

== Births ==
- May 2 – Pedro Jufresa, field hockey player
- June 18 – Harri Garmendia, swimmer
- June 21 – Lucas Alcaraz, footballer
- June 23 – María Isabel Salinas, politician
- July 12 – Alejandro Menéndez, football manager
- August 20 – Miguel Albaladejo, screenwriter and film director
- December 12 – Lydia Zimmermann, actress and film director

== Deaths ==
- 13 July – Princess Beatrice of Saxe-Coburg and Gotha (Duchess of Galliera) (born 1884 in the United Kingdom)

== See also ==
- List of Spanish films of 1966
