= 1950 in Spain =

- Decades: 1930s; 1940s; 1950s; 1960s; 1970s
- See also: Other events of 1950; List of years in Spain

Events in the year 1950 in Spain.

== Incumbents ==
- Caudillo: Francisco Franco

== Births ==
- January 17 – Cristina Galbó, actress
- January 24 – Matilde Fernández, social feminist and politician
- May 27 – Antonio Corell, swimmer
- June 16 – Pepe Navarro, football manager
- June 28 – Francisca Pleguezuelos, politician
- September 14 – Antonio Culebras, swimmer
- October 13 – Teresa Riera, politician
- November 5 – Emilio Lora-Tamayo, physicist (d. 2024)
- November 22 – José Ramón López, canoer
- December 13 – Luisa Fernanda Rudi Ubeda, politician
- Agustín Díaz Yanes, screenwriter and film director

== Deaths ==
- January 7 – Alfonso Daniel Rodríguez Castelao, politician, writer, painter and doctor (b. 1886)
- June 4 – Carmen Baroja, Spanish writer, ethnologist (b. 1883)
- August 31 – Pere Tarrés i Claret, Roman Catholic priest and blessed (b. 1905)
- November 4 – Francisca Herrera Garrido, Spanish writer (b. 1869)

== See also ==
- List of Spanish films of 1950
