= 1956 in Spain =

- Decades: 1930s; 1940s; 1950s; 1960s; 1970s
- See also: History of Spain; Timeline of Spanish history; List of years in Spain

Events in the year 1956 in Spain.

== Incumbents ==
- Caudillo: Francisco Franco

== Births ==
- January 10 – Antonio Muñoz Molina, novelist
- April 5 – El Risitas, comedian and actor (died 2021)
- July 7 – Marisa Manchado, composer and pianist (died 2026)
- September 30 – Magda Camps, Olympic swimmer
- November 13 – Miguel Lang, Olympic swimmer

== Deaths ==
- March 30 – Luis Bayón Herrera, film director and screenwriter (b. 1889)
- October 5 – Juan Armet, football player ad coach (b. 1895)

== See also ==
- List of Spanish films of 1956
