= 1946 in Spain =

- Decades: 1920s; 1930s; 1940s; 1950s; 1960s
- See also: History of Spain; Timeline of Spanish history; List of years in Spain

Events in the year 1946 in Spain.

== Incumbents ==
- Caudillo: Francisco Franco

== Events ==
- December 12: the United Nations General Assembly adopted Resolution 39 excluding the Spanish government from international organizations and conferences established by the United Nations due to the fascist nature of the Franco regime and involvement in the conspiracy that resulted in World War II.
- December 13: the Franco government organized a large demonstration at the Plaza de Oriente in response to the resolution's adoption.

== Births ==
- June 13 – Gonzalo Aja, cyclist
- July 29 – María Teresa Rejas, teacher and politician
- September 2 – Fernando Puche, businessman (d. 2024)
- December 5 – José Carreras, opera singer
- December 29 – Ana M. Briongos, writer

== Deaths ==
- June 16 - José María Miró. (b. 1872)

== See also ==
- List of Spanish films of the 1940s
