= Tusell =

Tusell is a surname. Notable people with the surname include:

- Alfonso Tusell (1906–1960), Spanish water polo player
- Fèlix Millet i Tusell (1935–2023), Spanish businessman
- Javier Tusell (1945–2005), Spanish historian
- Nolasc Acarín Tusell (born 1941), Spanish medical doctor
