= 1962 in Spain =

- Decades: 1940s; 1950s; 1960s; 1970s; 1980s
- See also: History of Spain; Timeline of Spanish history; List of years in Spain

Events in the year 1962 in Spain.

== Incumbents ==
- Caudillo: Francisco Franco

== Events ==
- 25 September - Vallés floods

== Births ==
- 9 January - Frank Kozik, graphic artist
- 23 March - Javier Melloni, Italian-Catalan Jesuit anthropologist and theologian
- 19 July – Pilar Fuertes Ferragut, diplomat
- Albert Guinovart, composer
- Enrique Urbizu, film director and screenwriter

== See also ==
- List of Spanish films of 1962
