= 1965 in Spain =

- Decades: 1940s; 1950s; 1960s; 1970s; 1980s
- See also: Other events of 1965; List of years in Spain

Events in the year 1965 in Spain.

== Events ==
- December 4 – The first victim of the del Águila family killings, Mari Carmen, dies.

== Incumbents ==
- Caudillo: Francisco Franco

== Births ==
- March 12 – Javier Moreno, politician
- October 6 – Jordi Aviles, field hockey player
- October 21 – Rosa Estaràs, politician
- Full date unknown:
  - Carmen Pagés-Serra, research economist and writer

== See also ==
- List of Spanish films of 1965
