= 1955 in Spain =

- Decades: 1930s; 1940s; 1950s; 1960s; 1970s
- See also: History of Spain; Timeline of Spanish history; List of years in Spain

Events in the year 1955 in Spain.

== Incumbents ==
- Caudillo: Francisco Franco

== Births ==
- 26 January – Javier López Marcano (died 2026), politician
- 4 February – Carme Junyent (died 2023), Catalan linguist
- 12 February – Enric Miralles (died 2000), architect
- 18 February – Consuelo Berlanga, journalist
- 21 February – Josep Piqué (died 2023), politician
- 8 March – Francisco José Millán Mon, politician
- 27 March – Mariano Rajoy, former Prime Minister of Spain
- 5 April – Antolín Sánchez, politician
- 20 May – Manolo Cadenas, handball coach
- 8 June – José Antonio Camacho, footballer
- 23 August – Jaume Plensa, Catalan sculptor
- 23 September – David Hammerstein Mintz, US-born politician
- 4 October – Carmen Valero (died 2024), Olympic runner
- 5 October – Ángela Molina, actress
- 1 December – Verónica Forqué (died 2021), actress

== Deaths ==
- 6 March — Juan de Hinojosa Ferrer (born 1886), Spanish Supreme Court judge and legal scholar

=== Date unknown ===
- Enrique Gómez (born 1916), screenwriter and film director

== See also ==
- List of Spanish films of 1955
