= 1951 in Spain =

- Decades: 1930s; 1940s; 1950s; 1960s; 1970s
- See also: Other events of 1951; List of years in Spain

Events in the year 1951 in Spain.

== Incumbents ==
- Caudillo: Francisco Franco

== Births ==
- January 14 – Carme Elías, actress
- August 3 – José Pujol, swimmer
- August 19 – Lluís Claramunt, artist
- September 7 – Javier Marías, author
- November 30 – José Ángel Egido, actor

== Deaths ==
- June 7 – Luis de Arana, sailor

== See also ==
- List of Spanish films of 1951
