= 1961 in Spain =

- Decades: 1940s; 1950s; 1960s; 1970s; 1980s
- See also: Other events of 1961; List of years in Spain

Events in the year 1961 in Spain.

== Incumbents ==
- Caudillo: Francisco Franco

== Births ==
- June 18 – Manuel Pereira, fencer
- July 23 – Gonzalo Arconada Echarri, football manager
- November 4 – Carlos García Cantarero, football manager
- December 24 – Silvia Fontana, swimmer

== Deaths ==
- April 7 – Jesús Guridi, Spanish Basque composer (b. 1886)
- April 19 – Manuel Quiroga, Spanish violinist (b. 1892)
- August 1 – Domingo Pérez Cáceres, Spanish Roman Catholic priest and saint (b. 1892)
- December 23 – Fanny Schoonheyt, Dutch Communist Lieutenant in the Spanish Civil War. (b. 1912)
- Miguel Gómez Bao – Spanish-born Argentine actor (b. 1894)

== See also ==
- 1961 in Spanish television
- List of Spanish films of 1961
