= 1969 in Spain =

- Decades: 1940s; 1950s; 1960s; 1970s; 1980s
- See also: Other events of 1969; List of years in Spain

Events in the year 1969 in Spain.

== Incumbents ==
- Caudillo: Francisco Franco

== Births ==
- 1 March – Javier Bardem, actor
- 20 May – Francisco Cabello, cyclist
- 9 August – Paloma Tortajada, broadcaster and journalist (d. 2019)
- 17 August – Alejandro Maclean, TV film producer and aerobatics pilot (d. 2010)
- 25 September - León Villar, judoka

== Deaths ==
- 31 May - Julio García Fernández de los Ríos. (b. 1894)

== Establishment ==
- Caravaca CF.

== See also ==
- 1969 in Spanish television
- List of Spanish films of 1969
