= Yvonne Scholten =

Dutch journalist, writer and documentarian

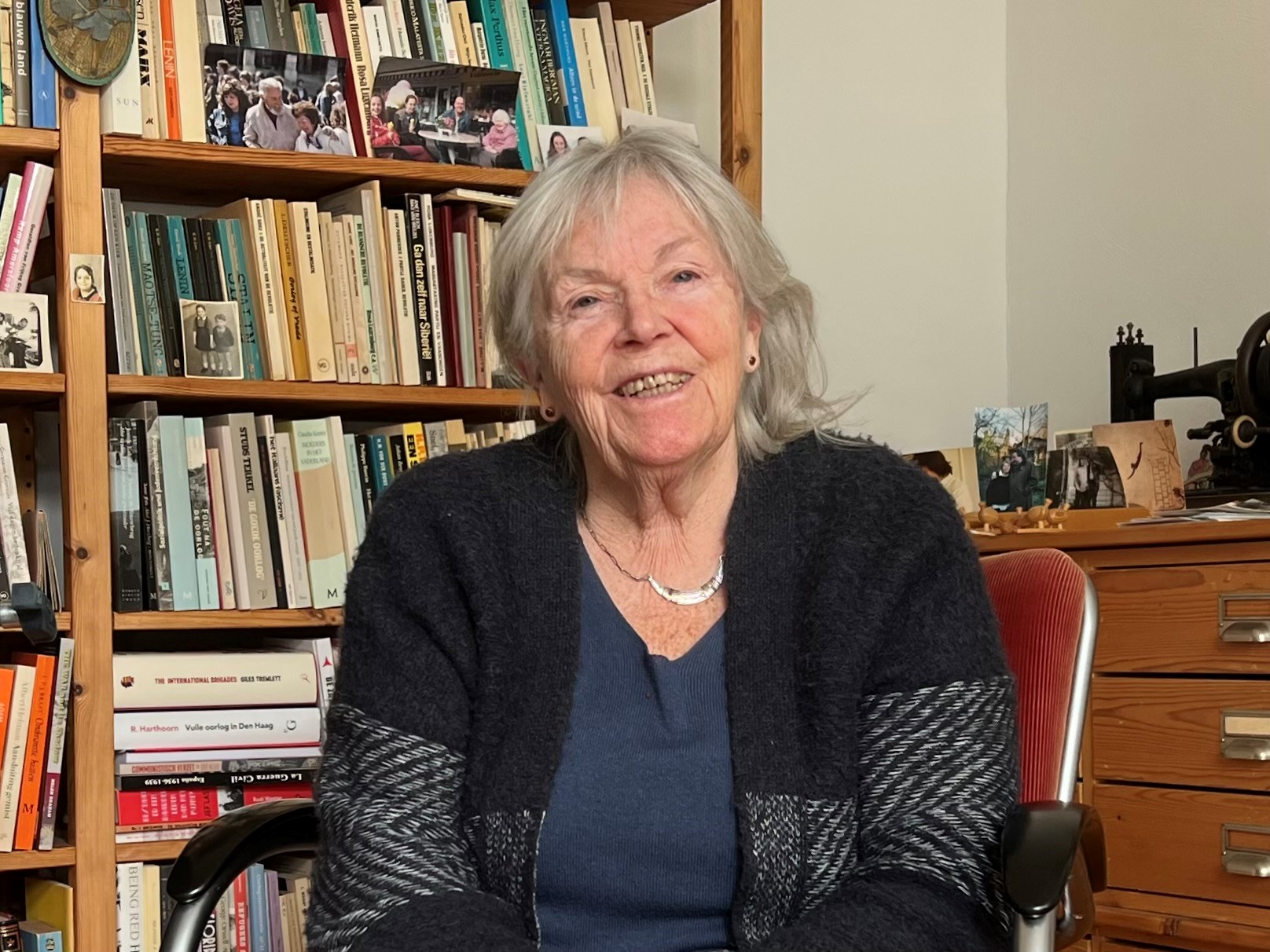
- Yvonne Scholten in 2023
- Occupations: Film director; film editor; writer
- Notable work: Donna: Women in Revolt (1980)

Yvonne Scholten is a Dutch journalist, writer and documentary maker.

== Career ==
Scholten was a foreign correspondent in Italy and worked as a radio programme maker for the broadcasters VARA and NPS.

In 1986, she made a radio programme about Fanny Schoonheyt for VPRO radio. Partly due to the current events surrounding the Dutch woman Tanja Nijmeijer, who fought for the FARC in Colombia, she resumed her research on Fanny Schoonheyt. Around that time, letters from Fanny Schoonheyt in Spain also came to light.

In 1980, she made the documentary Donna: Women in Revolt. This documentary tells the story of 80 years of women's resistance in Italy. The story begins with the fascist attack on the feminist radio station Donna in 1979. She traces the origins of this Italian women's movement through archive footage and interviews. Scholten speaks to women who resist all forms of oppression. The film was restored in 2023 by the Netherlands Institute for Sound and Vision and the Eye Film Museum. In 2024 it went on a tour in Europe, among others in Germany (Düsseldorf), the Netherlands (Leiden), Italy and Switzerland (at the Film Festival Diritti Umani Lugano).

In 2006, she received a De Tegel Award for her radio production Genoa – The Forgotten Trial. After the G8 summit in Genoa, Italy, had ended in 2001, peaceful demonstrators and journalists were attacked. Although some people were seriously injured and some even fell into a coma, the media paid no attention to the actions of the Italian police. In 2011, she made her debut with her book Fanny Schoonheyt. Fanny Schoonheyt (1912-1961) was the only Dutch woman to fight in the Spanish Civil War. In a short time, Fanny became known as “the bravest girl in Barcelona” and “the queen of the machine gun”.

Her second book centres on Bart van der Schelling (1892-1970), who leaves for America in search of fortune. After finding success as a singer on Broadway, he fights in the Lincoln Brigade during the Spanish Civil War. He returns wounded and subsequently makes a name for himself in Mexico as a naïve painter.

== Bibliography ==
- Fanny Schoonheyt Een Nederlands meisje strijdt in de Spaanse Burgeroorlog, uitgeverij Meulenhof, 2011, ISBN 9789029087797
- Bart van der Schelling De zingende Hollander van de Lincoln Brigade, uitgeverij Donker, 2015, ISBN 9789061006954
- Een Hollandse jongen aan de Ebro - Dagboek van Spanjestrijder Evert Ruivenkamp, uitgeverij Jurgen Maas, Amsterdam, 2022, ISBN 978-90-832108-2-7

== Awards ==
- De Tegel (2006)
