= 1958 in Spain =

- Decades: 1930s; 1940s; 1950s; 1960s; 1970s
- See also: History of Spain; Timeline of Spanish history; List of years in Spain

Events in the year 1958 in Spain.

== Incumbents ==
- Caudillo: Francisco Franco

== Births ==
- 13 January – Juan Pedro de Miguel, handball player (died 2016)
- 14 February – Francisco Javier López Peña, Basque separatist (died 2013)
- 27 February – Juan Antonio March Pujol, diplomat
- 19 July – José Ballesta, politician (died 2026)
- 12 October – David Amaral, footballer
- 30 October – Quique Hernández, football manager
- 8 December – Manuel Gómez Pereira, screenwriter and film director

== Deaths ==
- 9 June – Manuel Luna, film actor
- 18 November 18 – Francisco Pagazaurtundúa, footballer

== See also ==
- List of Spanish films of 1958
