= 1943 in Spain =

- Decades: 1920s; 1930s; 1940s; 1950s; 1960s
- See also: Other events of 1943; List of years in Spain

Events in the year 1943 in Spain.

== Incumbents ==
- Caudillo: Francisco Franco

== Events ==
- 14 April: Museum of the History of Barcelona was established

== Births ==
- 5 January – Ramón Sampedro, writer (died 1998)
- April 4 – Isabel-Clara Simó, journalist and writer (died 2020)
- April 15 – Sticky Vicky, ballet dancer and illusionist (died 2023)
- April 24 – Andrés Gandarias, road bicycle racer (died 2018)
- July 12 – Maite Idirin, singer (died 2024)
- July 29 – Antoni Torres, footballer (died 2003)
- August 5 – José Evangelista, composer (died 2023)
- September 23 – Julio Iglesias, singer-songwriter
- December 15 – Anna Balletbó, journalist and politician (died 2025)

== Deaths ==
- April 16 – Carlos Arniches, Spanish playwright (b. 1866)
- July 6 – Nazaria Ignacia March Mesa, Spanish-born Roman Catholic religious sister, canonized (b. 1889)
- July 20 – Maria Gay, Spanish opera singer (b. 1879)
- July 21 – José Jurado de la Parra, Spanish journalist, poet and playwright (b. 1856)

== See also ==
- List of Spanish films of the 1940s
