= 1944 in Spain =

- Decades: 1920s; 1930s; 1940s; 1950s; 1960s
- See also: History of Spain; Timeline of Spanish history; List of years in Spain

Events in the year 1944 in Spain.

== Incumbents ==
- Caudillo: Francisco Franco

== Events ==
- October: Invasion of Val d'Aran

== Births ==
- January 9 – José Gómez, Olympic cyclist. (d. 2014)
- January 28 – Rosalía Mera, fashion retailer (Zara). (d. 2013)
- March 18 – Carlos Espinosa de los Monteros y Bernaldo de Quirós, businessman and civil servant. (d. 2026)
- May 19 – Salvador Chuliá Hernández, composer and conductor (d. 2025)
- May 27 – Emilio Zapico, racing driver. (d. 1996)
- November 11 – José Sancho, actor. (d. 2013)
- December 26 – Jesús Aranguren, footballer. (d. 2011)

== Deaths ==
- February 18 – Alfredo Javaloyes López, musician (b. 1865)

== See also ==
- List of Spanish films of the 1940s
