= 1954 in Spain =

- Decades: 1930s; 1940s; 1950s; 1960s; 1970s
- See also: Other events of 1954; List of years in Spain

Events in the year 1954 in Spain.

== Incumbents ==
- Caudillo: Francisco Franco

== Births ==
- January 10 – Margarita Mariscal de Gante
- February 8 – Jorge Comas
- May 27 – José María Esteban
- July 8 – Pedro Balcells
- September 1 – Manuel Díaz Vega
- Full date unknown
  - Albert Girós

== See also ==
- List of Spanish films of 1954
