= 1952 in Spain =

- Decades: 1930s; 1940s; 1950s; 1960s; 1970s
- See also: Other events of 1952; List of years in Spain

Events in the year 1952 in Spain.

== Incumbents ==
- Caudillo: Francisco Franco

== Births ==
- January 12 – José Bas, Olympic swimmer
- March 12 – José Javier Pomés Ruiz, politician
- April 8 – Matías Alonso Ruiz, politician
- May 21 – Mila Ximénez, journalist and television personality (d. 2021)
- July 16 – Santiago Esteva, Olympic swimmer
- August 19 – Willy Meyer Pleite, politician
- October 1 – María Irigoyen Pérez, politician

== See also ==
- List of Spanish films of 1952
