= Victoria Díez Bustos de Molina =

Beatified Spanish teacher (1903–1936)

Blessed Victoria Díez Bustos de Molina
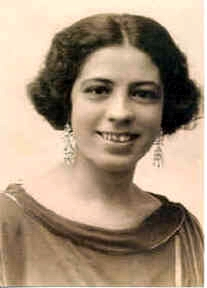
- Victoria Diez

Martyr
- Born: 11 November 1903; Seville, Kingdom of Spain
- Died: 12 August 1936 (aged 32); Hornachuelos, Córdoba, Second Spanish Republic
- Venerated in: Catholic Church
- Beatified: 10 October 1993, Saint Peter's Square, Vatican City by Pope John Paul II
- Feast: 12 August
- Patronage: Teachers

Victoria Díez Bustos de Molina (11 November 1903 - 12 August 1936) was a Spanish Roman Catholic and a member from the Teresian Association. Díez worked as a teacher and became well-loved among her students for her deep faith and her passion as well as her commitment to the education of children. Díez was beatified on 10 October 1993.

== Life ==
Victoria Díez Bustos de Molina was born on 11 November 1903 as the sole child to José Díez Moreno and Victoria Bustos de Molina.

Díez became a teacher instead of enlisting in the missions so as to appease her parents. She spent time in Seville while both teaching and preparing for her final examinations and received her master's degree in education in 1923; she studied there since 1919. She was sent to teach in Cheles in 1927 - close to the border of Portugal - before being moved not long after to Hornachuelos on 13 June 1928 to teach there and remained there until 1936. Díez remained there for almost a decade and often came into conflict with the authorities due to her refusal to remain silent about her faith which was well-noted across the area among those she came into contact with. She joined the Teresian Association in 1928 and had a devotion to Teresa of Ávila. She received first exposure to the movement after attending an afternoon conference with some friends on 25 April 1926. The local parish priest Antonio Molina Ariza approved for her to evangelize to the townspeople and offered classes for the adults. She collected clothing and food as well as medicine for poor people and often made clothing for girls. She maintained correspondence with the María Josefa Segovia Morón.

Díez was arrested in the evening on 11 August 1936 while teaching some women. Two armed men entered the room and arrested her. She kissed her mother who was present - and waved farewell to the women and followed the men out to be taken to a detention center. On 12 August at 2:00am she and seventeen men - Father Molina included, who was captured the month prior - were awakened and ordered out. They were marched along a trail for three hours and several of the men collapsed. But she urged them on, saying: "Take heart! I see the heavens opening. The prize awaits us!" She said this realizing they were going to be killed. Díez and the others were shot at dawn. Their bodies were thrown into an abandoned mineshaft. Her final words were: "Long live Christ the King!" Her remains were later relocated on 11 December 1965.

== Beatification ==
The beatification process opened on 24 May 1962 in an informative process that later closed not long after sometime in May 1963; she was titled as a Servant of God on 24 May 1962 under Pope John XXIII when the cause started and the Congregation for the Causes of Saints validated the process on 11 March 1988 in Rome. The Congregation received the positio in 1989 and theologians received it and approved it on 16 March 1993 as did the Congregation on 1 June 1993. Pope John Paul II confirmed on 6 July 1993 that she was killed in hatred of her faith and later beatified her on 10 October 1993. The postulator for the cause is Encarnación González Rodríguez.

== Sources ==
- Cárcel Ortí, Vicente (1990). La persecución religiosa en España durante la Segunda República, 1931-1939. Ediciones Rialp. ISBN 9788432126475. (in Spanish)
