= María Isabel Pérez =

María Isabel Pérez may refer to:

- María Isabel Pérez (sprinter)
- María Isabel Pérez (footballer)
- María Isabel Pérez Santos, Mexican politician

== See also ==
- María Pérez (disambiguation)
