= Francisco Solis =

Francisco Solis or Solís may refer to:

- Francisco Solis (athlete) (born 1957), Dominican Republic middle-distance runner
- Francisco Solís (bishop) (fl. 1530s), Albanian prelate of the Roman Catholic Church
- Francisco Solís (footballer) (born 1952), Mexican footballer
- Francisco Solís Hervás, (1657–1716), Spanish prelate of the Roman Catholic Church
- Francisco Solis (judoka) (born 1999), Chilean judoka
- Francisco Solís Peón (1968–2022), Mexican politician

== See also ==
- Francisco de Solís (fl. 17th century), Spanish baroque painter
- Francisco Arias Solís, Spanish politician
