= 1964 in Spain =

- Decades: 1940s; 1950s; 1960s; 1970s; 1980s
- See also: Other events of 1964; List of years in Spain

Events in the year 1964 in Spain.

== Incumbents ==
- President / Caudillo: Francisco Franco
- Vice President: Agustín Muñoz Grandes
- President of the Cortes Españolas: Alejandro Rodríguez de Valcárcel
- Secretary of the Movimiento Nacional Council: José Solís
- President of the Supreme Court: José Castán Tobeñas
- Cortes Españolas: 7th

== Births ==
- January 5 – Miguel Ángel Jiménez, golfer
- April 2 – Lucía, singer
- April 20 – Serafín Zubiri, singer
- June 14 – Bartolomé Madrid Olmo, politician
- July 9 – Arturo Daudén Ibáñez, football referee
- August 21 – Alfonso Lacadena, Mesoamerican epigraphist and academic (d. 2018)

== Deaths ==
- January 21 – Luis Martín Santos, psychiatrist
- February 13 – Paulino Alcántara, football player and manager
- April 29 – Wenceslao Fernández Flórez, journalist and novelist

== See also ==
- List of Spanish films of 1964
