= María Pérez =

María Pérez may refer to:

- María Pérez Balteira (fl. 13th-century), Galician composer and singer
- María Angélica Pérez (1897–1932), Argentine Roman Catholic nun
- María del Pilar Pérez (born 1951), Chilean architect convicted of murder
- María Irigoyen Pérez (born 1952), Spanish member of the European Parliament
- María Pérez (swimmer) (born 1962), Venezuelan Olympic swimmer
- María José Pérez (footballer) (born 1984), Spanish footballer
- María Belén Pérez Maurice (born 1985), Argentine fencer
- María Luisa Pérez-Soba (1930–2021) first woman agricultural engineer in Galicia
- María Isa Pérez-Vega, American politician and musician
- María Pérez Fernández (born 1987), Spanish footballer
- María José Pérez (volleyball) (born 1988), Venezuelan volleyball player
- María Pérez (judoka) (born 1989), Puerto Rican judoka
- María Isabel Pérez (footballer) (born 1992), Cuban footballer
- María José Pérez (runner) (born 1992), Spanish runner
- María Isabel Pérez (sprinter) (born 1993), Spanish sprinter
- María Jimena Pérez (born 1984), Argentine volleyball player
- María Pérez (race walker) (born 1996), Spanish racewalker
- María Paulina Pérez (born 1996), Colombian tennis player
- Maria Vergés Pérez, Spanish politician and musician
- María Fernanda Pérez (born 1995), Mexican footballer
- María Pérez (Spanish footballer) (born 2001), Spanish footballer
- Maria Perez (journalist), American journalist for the Naples Daily News; see List of George Polk Award winners
- Maria Perez (New Hampshire politician)
- María Teresa Pérez (Venezuelan politician)
- María Teresa Pérez (Spanish politician)
