= 1948 in Spain =

- Decades: 1920s; 1930s; 1940s; 1950s; 1960s
- See also: Other events of 1948; List of years in Spain

Events in the year 1948 in Spain.

== Incumbents ==
- Caudillo: Francisco Franco

== Births ==
- January 2 – Cristina García-Orcoyen Tormo, politician
- February 26 – Miguel Ángel Cascallana, handball player (d. 2015)
- March 5 – Paquirri, bullfighter (d. 1984)
- March 16 – Picanyol, comic artist.(d. 2021)
- March 29 – Daniel Astrain, footballer
- July 16 – Rita Barberá, politician, Mayor of Valencia (d. 2016)
- December 29 – Ventura Pérez Mariño, judge and politician (d. 2024)

== Deaths ==
- January 7 – Maria de Maeztu Whitney, Spanish educator, feminist (b. 1882)
- May 18 – Francisco Alonso, Spanish composer (b. 1887)

== See also ==
- List of Spanish films of the 1940s
