= 1949 in Spain =

- Decades: 1920s; 1930s; 1940s; 1950s; 1960s
- See also: Other events of 1949; List of years in Spain

Events in the year 1949 in Spain.

== Incumbents ==
- Caudillo: Francisco Franco

== Births ==
- June 15 – Albert Tarantola, physicist (d. 2009)
- July 24 – Joan Enric Vives Sicília, archbishop
- September 17 – Miguel Ángel Gómez Martínez, conductor and composer (d. 2024)
- November 2 – José Viejo, cyclist (d. 2014)

== Deaths ==
- January 14 – Joaquín Turina, composer (b. 1882)
- February 18 – Niceto Alcalá-Zamora, lawyer and politician (b. 1877)
- June 25 – Alejandro Lerroux, politician (b. 1864)
- Francesca Bonnemaison i Farriols, educator and promoter of female education (b. 1872)

== See also ==
- List of Spanish films of the 1940s
