= 1947 in Spain =

- Decades: 1920s; 1930s; 1940s; 1950s; 1960s
- See also: History of Spain; Timeline of Spanish history; List of years in Spain

Events in the year 1947 in Spain.

== Incumbents ==
- Caudillo: Francisco Franco

== Births ==
- September 7 – Rosa Conde, sociologist and politician

== Deaths ==
- July 18 – Amadeo García, football manager (b. 1887)
- August 29 – Manolete, bullfighter (b. 1917)

== See also ==
- List of Spanish films of the 1940s
