= 1945 in Spain =

- Decades: 1920s; 1930s; 1940s; 1950s; 1960s
- See also: Other events of 1945; List of years in Spain

Events in the year 1945 in Spain.

== Incumbents ==
- Caudillo: Francisco Franco

== Events ==
- July 20 – the third government of Francisco Franco begins

== Births ==
- June 9 – Luis Ocaña, road cycle racer. (d. 1994)
- September 15 – Eusebio Poncela, actor. (d. 2025)

== Deaths ==
- November 5 – Luís Fernando de Orleans y Borbón. (b. 1888)
- Fernando Obradors (b. 1897)

== See also ==
- List of Spanish films of the 1940s
