= Donna: Women in Revolt =

1980 documentary film

- Dutch: Donna: vrouwen in verzet
- Literally: Donna: Women in revolt
- Directed by: Yvonne Scholten
- Written by: Yvonne Scholten
- Edited by: Yvonne Scholten
- Production company: IKON TV
- Distributed by: The Eye Filmmuseum
- Release date: 1980
- Running time: 66 minutes
- Country: Netherlands
- Language: Italian

Donna: Women in Revolt (Dutch: Donna: Vrouwen in verzet) is a documentary film from 1980 directed by Yvonne Scholten. The film is part of the second feminist movement and was distributed by the Amsterdam Feminist Film Collective Cinemien. The film's starting point is the attack on 9 January 1979 by a fascist commando on Radio Donna, a feminist radio station in Rome. The film is a documentary that depicts 80 years of women's resistance based on archive footage and interviews. The documentary shows how Italian women resisted the church, the Christian Democrats, patriarchy and Mussolini. The film has been restored by the programme A Season of Classics supported by Creative Europe. Since its restoration, it has been screener in many festivals and cinematheques in Europe, for example in Rome, Milano, Düsseldorf, Amsterdam and Lugano at the Film Festival Diritti Umani Lugano.

== Background ==
Yvonne Scholten is a journalist and documentary director. In the 1970s and 1980s, she was a correspondent in Italy for Dutch broadcasters and newspapers. Yvonne Scholten used the method of oral history to gather women's points of view on their own history and their fight for recognition and rights. DONNA is her unique film. She then worked as an editor for Dutch TV until 2004.

== Reception ==
The film was broadcast on the Dutch IKON TV and distributed in the Netherlands by the Collective Cinemien.
