= 1885 in Spain =

- Decades: 1860s; 1870s; 1880s; 1890s; 1900s
- See also: History of Spain; Timeline of Spanish history; List of years in Spain

Events in the year 1885 in Spain.

== Incumbents ==
- Monarch: Alfonso XII (until 25 November)
- Prime Minister: Antonio Canovas del Castillo (until 27 November), Praxedes Mateo Sagasta (starting 28 November)

== Events ==
- March 7 - founding of the Roman Catholic Archdiocese of Madrid

== Births ==
- July 5 - Blas Infante

== Deaths ==
- November 25 - Alfonso XII
