= Stabilization Plan =

1959 Spanish economic reform

The Stabilization Plan of 1959 (Spanish: Plan de Estabilización de 1959) or the National Plan of Economic Stabilization (Plan Nacional de Estabilización Económica) were a series of economic measures taken by the Spanish Government in 1959. Its main goal was the economic liberalization of the Spanish markets, marking a turning point from the previous policies oriented towards achieving autarky.

The implementation of the plan led to mass migration movements (internal migrations but also abroad), with the population and the economic activity concentrating in the most dynamic areas, hollowing the rest of the country.

The Stabilization Plan of 1959 caused a sharp recession in 1959. Unemployment increased due to the decrease in production caused by higher imports, which lowered the demand for national products. This decrease in production also led to lower consumption and wage freezes. The monetary reserves of the Bank of Spain increased, inflation dropped from 12.6% in 1958 to 2.4% in 1960, Spain attracted foreign investment, and the relaxation of tariffs led to the import of new technologies.

Following the recession of the Stabilization Plan, there was an economic boom in Spain in the 1960s and early 1970s.

== See also ==
- Francoist Spain
  - First Francoism
- Economy of Spain
- Economic history of Spain
- 1959 in Spain
