= 1967 in Spain =

- Decades: 1940s; 1950s; 1960s; 1970s; 1980s
- See also: History of Spain; Timeline of Spanish history; List of years in Spain

Events in the year 1967 in Spain.

== Incumbents ==
- Caudillo: Francisco Franco

== Events ==
- 4 May: Alicante–Elche Miguel Hernández Airport was founded
- 1967 Volta a Catalunya

== Births ==
- January 1 – Juanma Bajo Ulloa, film director
- January 6 – Fátima Báñez, politician (d. 2026)
- March 24 – David Freixa, field hockey player
- April 4 – Sergio Valdeolmillos, basketball coach
- July 28 – Lucas Mondelo, basketball coach
- August 11 – Enrique Bunbury, singer-songwriter

== Deaths ==
- March 21 – Ramón Encinas, footballer (b. 1893)
- April 27 – Manolo Morán, actor (b. 1905)
- December 27 – Ferran Sunyer i Balaguer, mathematician (b. 1912)

== See also ==
- List of Spanish films of 1967
