= 1961 in Spanish television =

This is a list of Spanish television related events from 1961.

== Events ==
- 18 March - Spain enters the Eurovision Song Contest for the first time with "Estando contigo" performed by Conchita Bautista.
- July - The music show Escala en hi-fi, by Fernando García de la Vega debuts in TVE. First time Playback appears on Spanish TV.
- 30 September - Antonio (dancer) shows off on the programa Gran Parada.
- 10 October- Debut on TVE of one of the first Variety Shows in Spanish TV, titled Amigos del martes, with Artur Kaps, Franz Johan and Gustavo Re.
- 14 October - Adolfo Marsillach debuts as author on Televisión Española with the sitcom Silencio, se rueda.

== Debuts ==
- Acuda usted al doctor
- Chicas en la ciudad.
- El personaje y su mundo
- Plaza del castillo.
- Silencio, se rueda
- Una pareja cualquera
- Amigos del martes
- Analía Gadé nos cuenta
- A puerta cerrada
- Archivo secreto
- Así terminó
- As de diamantes
- A tiro de cámara
- Atlas de música
- Ayer noticia, hoy dinero
- Bohemios
- Brigada 8
- Charlas de otoño
- Chavales
- Checas de Madrid
- Cien mil pesetas
- Cinco estrellas
- Cine club musical
- Club Ama
- Concierto para el hogar
- Conjura
- Con la verdad por delante
- Consultorio
- Cotizaciones de Bolsa
- Domingo edición extra
- El desafío del hombre
- El Teatro y sus intérpretes
- En broma
- ¿Entiende usted el cine?
- Escala en hi-fi
- Escuela TVE
- España a determinar
- España en 16 mm
- Frontera
- Galería
- Gane su viaje
- Gran circo
- Impacto
- Itinerarios españoles
- Jardín de verano
- Kilómetro cero
- La hoguera
- Las marionetas de Herta Frankel
- La máscara y el rostro
- La sombra del destino
- La tortuga perezosa
- La vida y el derecho
- Luchando en la sombra
- Madrid, capital
- Mañanita de sol
- Melodías que triunfan
- Montovani
- Muchachos al aire libre
- Mundo insólito
- Mujeres en la historia
- Noticiero de hoy
- Nueva época
- Otro tiempo
- Orbe
- Por los caminos de España
- Por tierras de España
- Programa Gallina Blanca
- Reportaje deportivo
- Ronda de España
- Séptimo arte
- Serenata
- Sí o no
- Sólo para hombres
- Sólo para menores de 16 años
- ¡Soy mas malo...!
- Submarino
- Teatro de la ópera
- Teatro de la Zarzuela
- Todos los deportes
- La tortuga perezosa
- Tribunal de la historia
- La tortuga perezosa
- Un buen hombre
- Viaje a lo desconocido
- Walter y la familia Corchea
- Y seguimos con el cine...

== Television shows ==
- Telediario (1957- )
- Fila cero (1958-1962)
- Pantalla deportiva (1959-1963)
- Fiesta brava (1959-1964)
- Gran parada (1959-1964)
- Teatro de familia (1959-1965)
- Primer aplauso (1959-1966)
- Tengo un libro en las manos (1959-1966)
- Panorama (1960-1963)
- Gran teatro (1960-1964)

== Ending this year ==
- Club del martes (1960-1961)
- Cuarta dimensión (1960-1961)
- Holmes and Company (1960-1961)
- Mujeres solas (1960-1961)

== Foreign series debuts in Spain ==
- This Is Alice (Así es Alicia)
- The Adventures of Rin Tin Tin (Las aventuras de Rin Tin Tin)
- Colonel Humphrey Flack (Coronel Flack)
- The Four Just Men (Los 4 hombres justos)
- Meet McGraw (El detective Meet McGraw)
- The Twilight Zone (Dimensión desconocida)
- Circus Boy (El niño del circo)
- My Friend Flicka (Mi amiga Flicka)
- The Flintstones (Los Picapiedra)
- Five Fingers (Cinco dedos)
- Hong Kong (Hong Kong)

== Births ==
- 5 January - Isabel Gemio, hostess.
- 9 January - Alipio Gutiérrez, host.
- 1 March - David Cantero, host.
- 2 March - Emma Ozores, actress.
- 7 March - Agustín Bravo, host.
- 25 March - Pedro Reyes, comedian.
- 1 April - Juan Echanove, actor.
- 14 May - Cristina Higueras, actress.
- 22 May - Alfonso Arús, host.
- 27 May - Ana Blanco, hostess.
- 11 June - María Barranco, actress.
- 20 June - Javivi, actor.
- 21 June - Fernandisco, host.
- 28 July - Aitor Mazo, actor.
- 28 November - Ramón García, host.
- 3 December - Javier Capitán, host.
- 27 December - José Ribagorda, host.
- Cristina Morató, hostess.

== See also ==
- 1961 in Spain
- List of Spanish films of 1961
