= List of ambassadors of Spain to Zimbabwe =

Ambassador of Spain to Zimbabwe
- Coat of arms of Spain
- Incumbent; María Lourdes Sangróniz Guerricagoitia since 2 July 2025
- Ministry of Foreign Affairs; Secretariat of State for Foreign Affairs
- Style: The Most Excellent
- Residence: Harare
- Nominator: The Foreign Minister
- Appointer: The Monarch
- Term length: At the government's pleasure
- Inaugural holder: José Luis Blanco-Briones y de Cuéllar
- Formation: 1980
- Website: Mission of Spain to Zimbabwe

The ambassador of Spain to Zimbabwe is the official representative of the Kingdom of Spain to the Republic of Zimbabwe. It is also accredited to the Republic of Malawi and the Republic of Zambia.

Spain recognized and established diplomatic relations with Zimbabwe in 1980, opening a resident embassy in Harare in November 1980. José Luis Blanco-Briones y de Cuéllar was appointed the first ambassador, serving until his murder in July 1985. Between 2012 and 2015, the embassy remained closed due to the need to cut public spending.

== Jurisdiction ==
- Zimbabwe: The Embassy of Spain in Harare manages Spain–Zimbabwe relations and offers consular protection to Spaniards in the country, as well as in Malawi and Zambia.

The ambassador to Zimbabwe is also accredited to:

- Malawi: Both nations established diplomatic relations in 1972. The ambassadors to South Africa (1972–1977) and Tanzania (1977–1987) were previously responsible for this country. The honorary consulate of Spain is located in Lilongwe.
- Zambia: Spain and Zambia established diplomatic links in 1969. Spain has an honorary consul in Lusaka.

In the past, the ambassador to Zimbabwe also served as ambassador to Botswana (1983–1995) and Comoros (1984–1988).

== List of ambassadors ==
| Ambassador | | Term | Nominated by | Appointed by | Accredited to |
|---|---|---|---|---|---|
| 1 | José Luis Blanco-Briones y de Cuéllar (Note: Accredited to Botswana, Comoros and Zambia.) | 10 September 1981 – 22 July 1985† (3 years, 315 days) | José Pedro Pérez-Llorca | Juan Carlos I | Canaan Banana |
| 2 | Nabor Manuel García García | 23 January 1986 – 11 June 1988 (2 years, 140 days) | Francisco Fernández Ordóñez | Juan Carlos I | Canaan Banana |
| 3 | José Manuel Paz Agüeras (Note: Accredited to Botswana, Malawi and Zambia.) | 16 July 1988 – 6 June 1992 (3 years, 326 days) | Francisco Fernández Ordóñez | Juan Carlos I | Robert Mugabe |
| 4 | Jesús Carlos Riosalido Gambotti | 8 June 1992 – 18 January 1997 (4 years, 224 days) | Francisco Fernández Ordóñez | Juan Carlos I | Robert Mugabe |
| 5 | Tomás Solís Gragera (Note: Accredited to Malawi and Zambia.) | 18 January 1997 – 23 June 2001 (4 years, 156 days) | Abel Matutes | Juan Carlos I | Robert Mugabe |
| 6 | Francisco Javier Sandomingo | 23 June 2001 – 8 May 2004 (3 years, 106 days) | Josep Piqué | Juan Carlos I | Robert Mugabe |
| 7 | Santiago Martínez-Caro de la Concha-Castañeda | 2 October 2004 – 10 November 2008 (4 years, 39 days) | Miguel Ángel Moratinos | Juan Carlos I | Robert Mugabe |
| 8 | Pilar Fuertes Ferragut | 10 November 2008 – 2 April 2012† (3 years, 144 days) | Miguel Ángel Moratinos | Juan Carlos I | Robert Mugabe |
Embassy closed during this period.
| 9 | Alicia Moral Revilla | 25 April 2015 – 4 August 2018 (3 years, 101 days) | José Manuel García-Margallo | Felipe VI | Robert Mugabe |
| 10 | Santiago Gómez-Acebo Rodríguez-Spiteri | 9 November 2018 – 27 July 2022 (3 years, 260 days) | Josep Borrell | Felipe VI | Emmerson Mnangagwa |
| 11 | Natividad Isabel Peña Bonilla | 27 July 2022 – 16 July 2025 (2 years, 359 days) | José Manuel Albares | Felipe VI | Emmerson Mnangagwa |
| 12 | Francisco Javier Pagalday | 2 July 2025 – present (1 year, 67 days) | José Manuel Albares | Felipe VI | Emmerson Mnangagwa |
