= 1959 in Spain =

- Decades: 1930s; 1940s; 1950s; 1960s; 1970s
- See also: History of Spain; Timeline of Spanish history; List of years in Spain

Events in the year 1959 in Spain.

== Incumbents ==
- Caudillo: Francisco Franco

== Events ==
- Stabilization Plan introduced to liberalize the Spanish economy, leading to the Spanish miracle of the 1960s.

== Births ==
- March 7 – Julio Revuelta, architect and politician (died 2026)
- April 3 – Fermín Vélez, racing driver (died 2003)
- April 26
  - Rosa Estiarte, Olympic swimmer (died 1985)
  - Montserrat Majo, Olympic swimmer
- April 29 – Josep María Nogués, footballer
- June 9 – José Guirao, politician and cultural manager (died 2022)
- July 3 – José Baselga, oncologist (died 2021)
- July 4 – Victoria Abril, actress and singer
- September 24 – Ana Mato, politician
- October 1 – Marcos Alonso, footballer (died 2023)
- October 4 – Patxi López, politician
- November 13 – José Carlos Somoza, writer

== Deaths ==
- July 7 – Hermenegildo Anglada Camarasa, Spanish painter (b. 1871)
- July 26 – Manuel Altolaguirre, Spanish poet (b. 1905)
- August 8 – Luis Araquistáin, Spanish politician and writer (b. 1886)
- October 27 – Juan José Domenchina, Spanish poet (b. 1898)

== See also ==
- List of Spanish films of 1959
