= 1963 in Spain =

- Decades: 1940s; 1950s; 1960s; 1970s; 1980s
- See also: Other events of 1963; List of years in Spain

Events in the year 1963 in Spain.

== Incumbents ==
- Caudillo: Francisco Franco

== Events ==
- The Spanish nuclear program, Project Islero, is born.

== Births ==
- May 3 – Jordi Ribera, handball coach
- August 11 – Natalia Más, swimmer

== Deaths ==
- January 13 – Ramón Gómez de la Serna, Spanish writer (b. 1888)
- November 5 – Luis Cernuda, Spanish poet (b. 1902)
- November 19 – Carmen Amaya, Spanish dancer (b. 1918)

== See also ==
- List of Spanish films of 1963
