= 1886 in Spain =

- Decades: 1860s; 1870s; 1880s; 1890s; 1900s
- See also: History of Spain; Timeline of Spanish history; List of years in Spain

Events in the year 1886 in Spain.

== Incumbents ==
- Monarch: Alfonso XIII (from May 17)
- Prime Minister: Práxedes Mateo Sagasta

== Events ==
- April 4 - Spanish general election, 1886

== Births ==
- May 17 - Alfonso XIII

=== Date unknown ===
- Juan de Hinojosa Ferrer (died 1955), Spanish Supreme Court judge and legal scholar
