= 1940 in Spain =

- Decades: 1920s; 1930s; 1940s; 1950s; 1960s
- See also: History of Spain; Timeline of Spanish history; List of years in Spain

Events in the year 1940 in Spain.

== Incumbents ==
- Caudillo: Francisco Franco

== Events ==
- November 9 – Joaquín Rodrigo's Concierto de Aranjuez premieres in Barcelona, Spain.

== Births ==
- Robert Saladrigas, Spanish writer, journalist and literary critic (d. 2018)
- February 25 – Jesús López Cobos, Spanish-born conductor (d. 2018)
- April 20 – Pilar Miró, Spanish screenwriter and film director (d. 1997)

== Deaths ==
- February 8 - Antonio Escobar Huertas (born 1879)
- May 19 – Diego Mazquiarán, Spanish matador (born 1895)
- September 26 — Walter Benjamin, German-Spanish philosopher and critic (born 1892)
- October 15 - Lluís Companys, execution by firing squad (born 1882)
- November 3 - Manuel Azaña (born 1880)

== See also ==
- List of Spanish films of the 1940s
