= 1953 in Spain =

- Decades: 1930s; 1940s; 1950s; 1960s; 1970s
- See also: Other events of 1953; List of years in Spain

Events in the year 1953 in Spain.

== Incumbents ==
- Caudillo: Francisco Franco

== Births ==
- February 14 – Valero Rivera López, handball coach
- March 4 – Agustí Villaronga, film director, screenwriter and actor
- April 12 – Álex Angulo, actor (d. 2014)
- August 27 – Rosa Miguélez, politician
- Antonio Hernández, film director and screenwriter

== Deaths ==
- May 19 – Dámaso Berenguer, Spanish soldier and Prime Minister (b. 1873)
- September 24 – Jacobo Fitz-James Stuart, 17th Duke of Alba, Spanish aristocrat (b. 1878)

== See also ==
- List of Spanish films of 1953
