= 1884 in Spain =

- Decades: 1860s; 1870s; 1880s; 1890s; 1900s
- See also: History of Spain; Timeline of Spanish history; List of years in Spain

Events in the year 1884 in Spain.

== Incumbents ==
- Monarch: Alfonso XII
- Prime Minister: José Posada Herrera (until 20 January), Antonio Cánovas del Castillo (starting 20 January)

== Events ==
- April 27 - Spanish general election, 1884
