= 1960 in Spain =

- Decades: 1940s; 1950s; 1960s; 1970s; 1980s
- See also: Other events of 1960; List of years in Spain

Events in the year 1960 in Spain.

== Incumbents ==
- Caudillo: Francisco Franco

== Births ==
- February 16 – Antonio Dechent, actor
- May 7 – Almudena Grandes, writer (died 2021)
- May 17 – Margarita Armengol, Olympic swimmer
- August 10 – Antonio Banderas, actor
- October 10 – Karra Elejalde, actor
- September 12 – Manuel Jiménez González, football player and manager
- November 28 – Víctor Fernández, football coach

== Deaths ==
- August 25 – Agustín Sancho.

== See also ==
- List of Spanish films of 1960
