= Juan Pedro de Miguel =

Spanish handball player (1958-2016)

Juan Pedro de Miguel Rubio (13 January 1958 – 12 August 2016) was a Spanish handball player who competed in the 1980 Summer Olympics and in the 1984 Summer Olympics.

In 1980 he was part of the Spanish team which finished fifth in the Olympic tournament. He played all six matches as goalkeeper. Four years later he finished eighth with the Spanish team in the 1984 Olympic tournament. He played five matches as goalkeeper.

Rubio died on 12 August 2016 from a heart attack. He was 58.
