= Magda Camps =

Spanish swimmer

Personal information
- Born: 30 September 1956 (age 70)

Sport
- Sport: Swimming
- Strokes: Butterfly

Achievements and titles
- Olympic finals: 1976 Summer Olympics

Magda Camps (born 30 September 1956) is a Spanish former swimmer who competed in the 1976 Summer Olympics.
