= Bernardo Adam Ferrero =

Spanish composer, conductor, and musicologist (1942–2022)

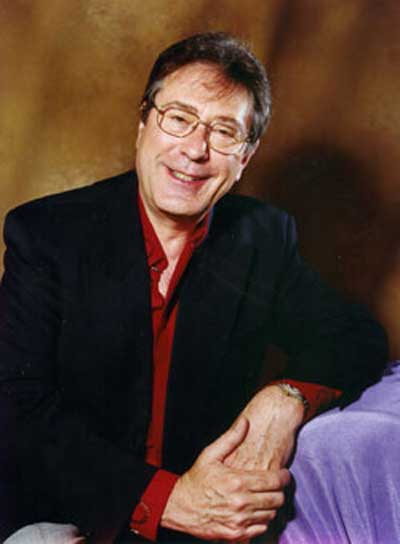
- Bernardo Adam Ferrero in 2005
- Born: 28 February 1942; Algemesí, Spain
- Died: 12 October 2022 (aged 80); Valencia, Spain
- Occupations: Composer; Conductor; Musicologist; Festival Director
- Organizations: Band of the Spanish Navy; Certamen Internacional de Bandes de Música Ciutat de Valencia

Bernardo Adam Ferrero (28 February 1942 – 12 October 2022) was a Spanish composer, conductor, and musicologist. He is known for conducting concert bands, including the Spanish military bands, and composing music for them. He wrote books about the topic, presented a radio program and directed a festival. His compositions earned him prestigious prizes, and his works are played around the world.

== Life and career ==
Born in Algemesí, Adam Ferrero was a clarinetist in the local band as a boy of age eight. He studied at the conservatory of Valencia from age 10 with Amando Blanquer Ponsoda, piano, harmony, counterpoint, composition and conducting. He studied conducting further at the Madrid Royal Conservatory with Enrique García Asensio.

His first conductor position was with the Enguera Music Band in 1962, when he was age 20. A year later he became conductor of the Civil Music Bands, then as the youngest of them in Spain. He moved on to conducting the Ateneo Musical Band in Cullera. He was awarded the Joaquín Rodrigo Composition Prize for a choral work, Cant espiritual, setting a text by Ausiàs March.

He continued his studies abroad, at the Accademia Musicale Chigiana in Siena, at the Accademia Nazionale di Santa Cecilia in Rome, with Luigi Dallapiccola, Franco Ferrara, Nino Antonellini, Goffredo Petrassi and Boris Porena among others, and at the Conservatoire de Paris with Olivier Messiaen.

Adam Ferrero conducted several symphony orchestras, choirs and ensembles, including the Orquesta de València, symphony orchestra in Spain, Sofía and the Teatro Colón in Buenos Aires, of Tarija, Bolivia among others. He conducted concert bands internationally, including the Philippines, Europe and the Americas. He collaborated with soloists such as Leon Ara and Narciso Yepes. He was also conductor of the symphony orchestra of Lliria, and of the bands of the Motorised Infantry Division "Maestrazgo3" from 1975 to 1980, of the Music of the Military Government of San Sebastián from 1980 to 1982, and of the Symphonic Band of the Marine Infantry of Madrid from 1995 to 2004.

In the 1980s, he presented a program on radio, La música de Valencia for the broadcaster COPE. He was director of the internationally known festival for bands, Certamen Internacional de Bandes de Música Ciutat de Valencia. director of the Semana internacional de música religiosa de Plasencia from 1999 to 2001, and director of the Semana internacional de música religiosa de Valencia in 2003 and 2011. He led two composers' congresses at the Palau de la Música de València, and an International Wind Music Congress in Castellón in 2002.

He received several awards for his compositions, including the Joaquín Rodrigo Prize of the Spanish Ministry of the Exterior in 1970 and 1974. He was awarded the Manuel Palau Prize in 1974, and the prize of the Instituto de Estudios Alicantinos in 1982 for his composition Danzas alicantinas. The city of Valencia named him a Ballester de l'Any for his contributions to the cultural exchange in the city and its artistic development. He was a member of the Real Academia de Bellas Artes de San Fernando in Madrid, director of the Academia de la Música Valenciana, and an honorary member of the Fundación Carlos III. He was awarded membership of the Royal Order of San Hermenegildo awarded by King Juan Carlos I, and an honorary doctorate of the University of Sydney. He received the Order of Merit in New York for his contribution to music, the Golden Batuta of Havana, and the Gold Medal of the Mid West of Chicago.

=== Personal life ===
Ferrero was married to Amparo Llagües Benet. The couple had three children, María Amparo, a general auditor of the Generalitat Valenciana, Bernat, conductor and professor, and Rubén, professor of violin.

Ferrero died in Valencia on 12 October 2022, at age 80.

== Works ==
Adam Ferrero turned to composing for bands, because there was little original music for them when he grew up.

=== Works for concert band ===
- Dances Valencianas, 1978
- Dances valencianes, Pilales, Valencia, 1981
- Danzas alicantinas, 1982
- Divertimento para banda, Piles, Valencia, 1984 OCLC 435818285
- Homenaje A Joaquín Sorolla
- Impresiones festeras : estructuras sinfónicas : Ontinyent: Moros y Cristianos, Piles, Valencia, 1988 ISBN 978-8-486-10641-6 OCLC 978019089
- Divertimento para Band, 1987
- El cantar del mío Cid, symphonic poem based on "Cantar de Mio Cid", 1994
- Sagunto / Suite sinfónica, 1995, Albadoc D.L., Valencia, 2004 OCLC 868927861
- El Dos de Mayo en Madrid, after a text by Luis López Anglada, 1996, Rivera Editores, Valencia 2004 OCLC 805623906
- Fallera major de Valencia, symphonic poem
- Imagenes de la Armada Española symphonic poem, 1997
- Castell de l'Olla, symphonic poem, Institut Valencià de la Música D.L., 2001 OCLC 733262745
- Tierra mítica, Institut Valencià de la Música D.L., Valencia, 2002 OCLC 733263393
- Diálogos, concerto for 4 horns and band, Rivera D.L, Valencia, 2004 OCLC 435841580
- Bendito seas, Señor, motet for alto and band, text by Rafael Benet, Valencia Piles D.L., 2005 OCLC 435929557
- El nou d'octubre, Suite, Rivera Editores, Valencia, 2007 OCLC 794510476
- El milagro de la vida, Diputación Provincial de Valencia, Valencia, 2016 OCLC 1117418406
- Marcha federal, música para una ceremonia for symphonic band, Federación de Sociedades Musicales de la Comunitat Valenciana, 2018 OCLC 1240236169
- Divertimento Giocoso
- En el claustro de Santo Domingo, symphonic poem
- Estructuras sinfónicas, 2012
- Fanfarria para metales, recorded on CD Homenaje a la M.I. Academia de la Música Valenciana by the Ensemble Col Legno conducted by Robert Ferrer, 2014
- Homenaje a Joaquín Sorolla, cuadros sinfónicos,
- Marroquíes 90, Marcha mora
- Obertura Músicos Sin Fronteras, recorded on CD Los Derechos Humanos, a Bombo y Platillo, by Banda Sinfónica Músicos Sin Fronteras conducted by José Miguel Micó Castellano, Bandística, 2017
- Obertura para una reina
- Suite Poemática a Federico García Lorca

=== Chamber music ===
- Tres para tres for flute, clarinet and bassoon, Piles, Valencia, 1979 OCLC 435851794
- Movimentos for four trumpets in F OCLC 810410840
- Llevantines for woodwind quintet (flute, oboe, clarinet, horn bassoon), Piles Valencia, 1980 OCLC 1117439710
- Introduccion y llamada, for two trumpets in F and organ, A. Ferrero, San Sebastian, 1982 OCLC 794908759
- Camerata Mid-West für Instrumentalensemble, Piles, Valencia, 1994 ISBN ISBN 978-8-488-54872-6 OCLC 977072592
- Homenaje a Manuel de Falla for clarinet quartet (2 clarinets in B, bassett horn and bass clarinet), Piles, Valencia, 1996 ISBN 978-8-489-59523-1 OCLC 981305276
- Tres interludios for clarinet, Piles, Valencia, 1997 ISBN 978-8-489-59573-6 OCLC 981450378
- Suite española for clarinet and piano, Eufonia, Pisogne, 2005 OCLC 71306337
- Preludio y danza mediterráne for flute and piano, Valencia, 2012OCLC 871797810

=== Piano music ===
- Imágenes for piano, Piles, Valencia, 2002 OCLC 61682411

=== Vocal music ===
- Cançoner, cançons populars valencianes, Piles, Valencia, 1979 OCLC 1187041784
- Cant espiritual for four mixed voices, text by Ausiàs March, Piles D.L., Valencia, 1998 OCLC 435697126

=== Books ===
- Adam Ferrero, Bernardo (2003). 1000 musicos valencianos (in Spanish). Valencia: Sounds of Glory. ISBN 84-607-9246-3.
- Mínguez Bargues, Raquel. Bernardo Adam Ferrero : La creatividad al servicio de las bandas de música, Sociedad Latina de Comunicación Social, La Laguna, Teneriffa, 2015 ISBN 978-8-416-45807-3 OCLC 927802896
- Adam Ferrero, Bernardo. Guía internacional de la música de viento, Vive Libro, 2019 ISBN 978-8-418-04121-1 OCLC 1142926318
