= Jordi Aviles =

Spanish field hockey player (born 1964)

Jordi Aviles (born 6 October 1964) is a Spanish former field hockey player who competed in the 1992 Summer Olympics.
