= Alfonso Lacadena =

Spanish archaeologist

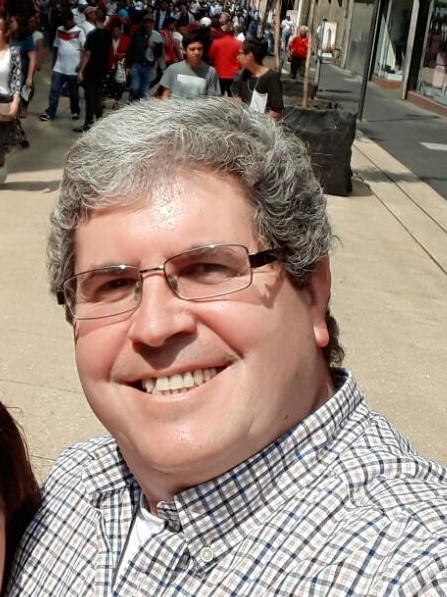
- Lacadena in 2017
- Born: 21 August 1964; Zaragoza, Aragón, Spain
- Died: 9 February 2018 (aged 53); Madrid, Spain
- Education: Complutense University of Madrid
- Known for: Mayan and Aztec epigraphy
- Awards: Tatiana Proskouriakoff Prize (Harvard University)
- Scientific career
- Fields: Mesoamerican cultures
- Workplaces: Complutense University of Madrid

Alfonso Lacadena García-Gallo (August 21, 1964 – February 9, 2018), was a Spanish archaeologist, historian and epigraphist. He specialized in Mayan culture, specifically in deciphering and interpreting its texts. He was also a professor at the Complutense University of Madrid.

== Biography ==
Born in Zaragoza, Lacadena was a specialist in Mesoamerican indigenous written sources, Mayan linguistics, Nahuatl writing and comparative Mesoamerican literature. An author of numerous monographs on these topics, he had a Doctorate in History and was awarded the Extraordinary Doctorate Award (Academic year 1994–1995) of the Faculty of Geography and History of the Complutense University for his doctoral thesis on Mayan handwriting. On October 13, 2011, the Peabody Museum of Archaeology and Ethnology, from Harvard University, awarded him the Tatiana Proskuriakof Prize for his contributions to the decipherment of Mayan and Nahuatl writing.

Lacadena worked with the Ch'orti ethnic group in eastern Guatemala, near Honduras. He dug in the ruins of Matxakila, in the Petén jungle. He studied hieroglyphic texts at Ek Balam, about 50 kilometers from Chichén Itzá. He also taught numerous epigraphy courses at both the Autonomous University of Madrid and the Autonomous University of Yucatán as well as at the National Autonomous University of Mexico.

He was author of two own works, seven co-works and five articles. In October 2017, the III Meeting of Gramotology honored him for his work at the National Autonomous University of Mexico. Married, he was father of two children. He died of cancer on 9 February 2018, aged 53.
