= Fernando Puche =

Spanish businessman (1946–2024)

Fernando Puche Doña (2 September 1946 – 14 September 2024) was a Spanish businessman. He was the president of football club Málaga from 1997 to 2001, a period in which the club achieved consecutive promotions from the Segunda División B to La Liga.

Puche had other business interests, including the Plaza de toros de La Malagueta, and hotels in Cuba and Spain. He was indicted in an operation against tobacco smuggling in 1999 and was convicted in 2010, being fined €16.6 million. He was sentenced to two years in prison in 2019 for concealing his assets in relation to the fine.

== Business career ==
Born in Málaga in Andalusia on 2 September 1946, Puche was raised in the neighbourhood of Huelin. When he was 5, his mother died and he moved to La Trinidad (Málaga). He began working at age 10, washing glasses at his father's bar. A gifted student, he was unable to continue his studies due to his work.

Returning to Huelin, Puche worked as a waiter in a restaurant where he became manager at 17. He married at 24 and had two sons and two daughters. A friend proposed a new business, supplying food and daily items to ships docked in the harbour, and their enterprise became the second-largest in Europe in its sector. Other business interests included the management of the Plaza de toros de La Malagueta and the Málaga Carnival.

Puche's property company Edisol built 1,000 social housing units in Antequera, as well as a barracks for the Civil Guard. As of 2010, he owned nine hotels in Cuba and two in Torremolinos, employing 1,100 people and hosting 4,000 beds.

== Presidency of Málaga CF ==
In 1992, after the dissolution of the local football club CD Málaga, he became part of the board at the new Málaga CF, serving as vice president to Federico Beltrán. In 1997, Puche bought out Beltrán and became president of the club, who were in the third-tier Segunda División B. He fired manager Tolo Plaza and hired Ismael Díaz. His first signing was former Boca Juniors player Pablo Trobbiani, who hardly played, while other signings such as José María Movilla and Sandro played a bigger part in the team's promotion as champions.

With the team playing in the Segunda División for 1998–99, Puche brought in Joaquín Peiró as manager. Mass media company Grupo Zeta, owned by Antonio Asensio, provided the investment for 19 new players, including Catanha and Francisco Rufete. Puche predicted that the club would be promoted on 30 May, his name day after Ferdinand III of Castile; this came to be with a 3–2 home win over Albacete with three games remaining.

In preparation for playing in La Liga, Puche signed Ajax-trained midfielder Kiki Musampa, a deal that he called "a milestone in the history of milestones". Peiró wanted to sign Pedro Munitis from Racing de Santander, a player he had trained at Badajoz; Puche met the player's €13 million release clause but he chose not to leave.

Puche sought for Málaga CF to pay for the 3 billion Spanish peseta renovation of La Rosaleda Stadium, in exchange for its owners – the city and provincial councils and the Regional Government of Andalusia – ceding the property to the club. This proposal was vetoed by the mayor, Celia Villalobos. In September 1999, the three public bodies reached an agreement in which a new public limited company would be in charge of renovating the stadium, while operation of the ground would be leased to the football club for 50 years and an annual rent of one peseta.

With Málaga secure in the top flight but facing financial issues, Puche resigned in 2001 during a dinner at a fan club in Manzanares, Ciudad Real. Serafín Roldán, already 92% shareholder in the club, took over as president.

== Tobacco smuggling ==
In 1999, Puche was indicted in an operation against tobacco smuggling. He was convicted in 2010 and fined €16.6 million. In 2019, he was convicted of concealing his assets in relation to this fine and given a suspended sentence of two years in prison. He was called to prison in April 2021 for non-payment, but appealed on claims of having an incurable disease. This was rejected on lack of evidence in November 2022 and he voluntarily entered the prison in Alhaurín el Grande.

== Death ==
Puche died at home on 14 September 2024, at the age of 78. His former football club paid tribute before their match against Huesca that day. His funeral was held privately.
