= Institut Marques =

Spanish medical institution

Institut Marquès is a private Spanish medical institution specialized in gynecology and assisted reproduction. It was founded in 1941 in Barcelona, and it counts a team of more than one hundred medical and sanitary professionals. Institut Marquès is internationally distinguished for its pioneer study of the male factor and the genetic analysis of sperm cells.

== History ==
In 1941, Dr. Vicens Marquès i Bertran, one of the founding members of the Spanish Society of fertility, founded the clinic known as Sanatorio Maternal, where more than 7000 successful labors and 2000 gynecological interventions were accomplished.

In 1952 his son Dr. Leonardo Marquès Giraut, head of the clinic Instituto Municipal of Maternology and the department of Gynecology at the Hospital Ntra. Sra. Del Mar until 1969, joined the team. He also directed the infertility department for the Cruz Roja Hospital in Barcelona. Dr. leonardo Marquès Giraut carried out various studies on the permeability of fallopian tubes achieving the "Fargas de la Academia de Ciencias médicas de Barcelona".

The current directors, Dr. Leonardo Marquès Amorós and Dr. Marisa López-Teijón, joined in 1987.

In 1989 Institut Marquès set up the first in vitro fertilization lab which was renovated and expanded in 2009 with top-of-the-line equipment in reproductive biology.

In 2005 the clinic created a preimplantation genetic diagnosis (PGD) lab at CIMA clinic, instigating the genetic analysis of embryos, ovules and spermatozoids.

The same year, the first baby was born after the adoption of an embryo frozen for thirteen years, nine months after the Adoption Program of Embryos was started.
