= Lluís Claramunt =

Catalan artist (1951–2000)

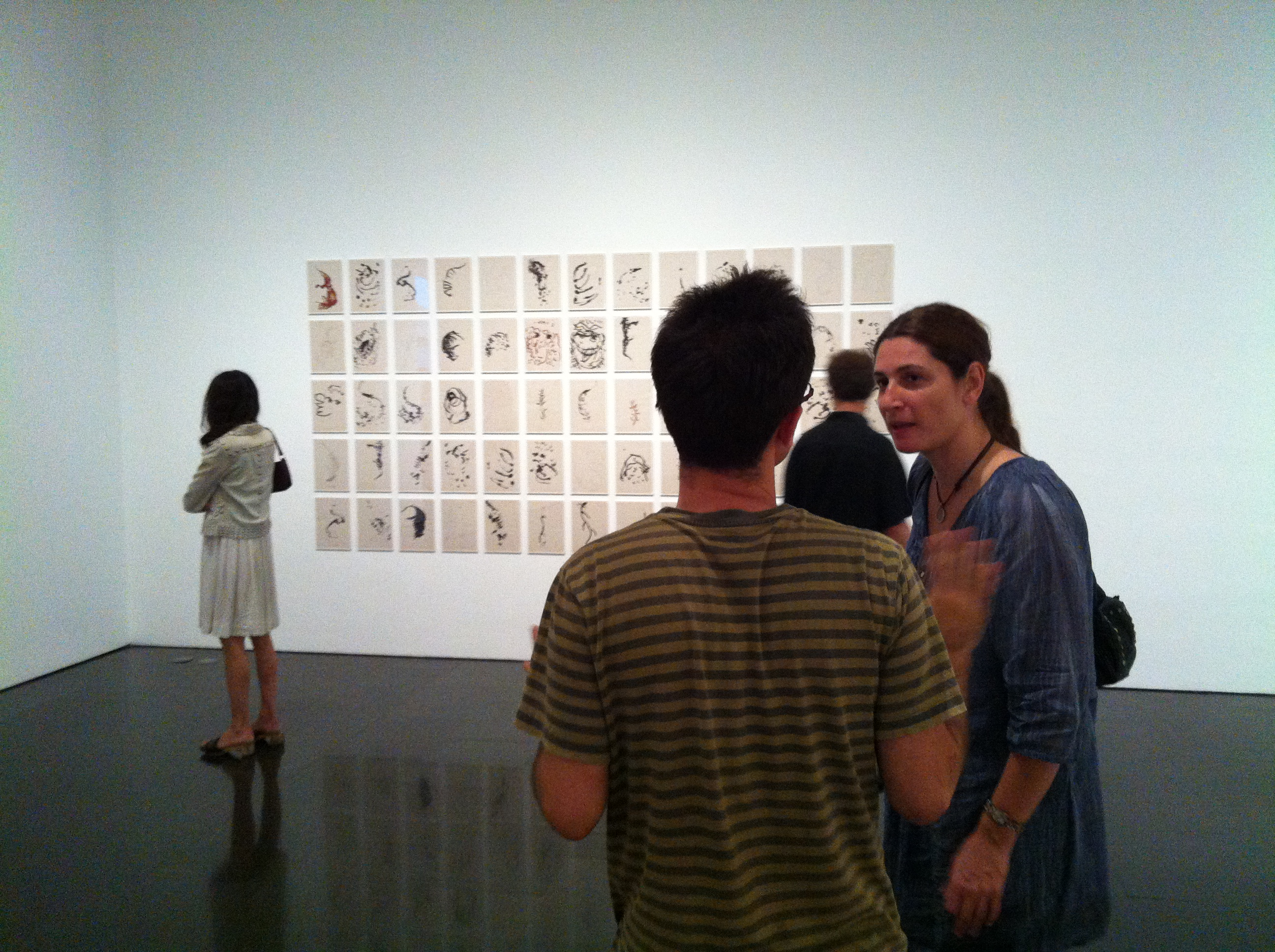
People visiting a Claramunt exhibit

Lluís Claramunt (19 August 1951 in Barcelona – 18 December 2000 in Zarautz) was a Spanish artist.

== Biography ==
A self-taught artist, Claramunt belongs to a generation that tried to be of its time without belonging to it. The start of his career in the 1970s coincided with the emergence of a more politicised approach to art to which most of his contemporaries subscribed, at a time when Barcelona was teeming with experimental initiatives in the spheres of art, literature and film, as well as underground subcultures.

During this period, Claramunt swam against the tide, focusing on painting rather than looking to the avant-gardes for inspiration. The finishes of naturalist painting, and in particular the work of Isidre Nonell, became the first rung of the ladder that Claramunt would build in the course of his life. The subject matter and style of his work gradually changed as Claramunt physically and socially distanced himself from Barcelona.

=== Solo exhibits list ===
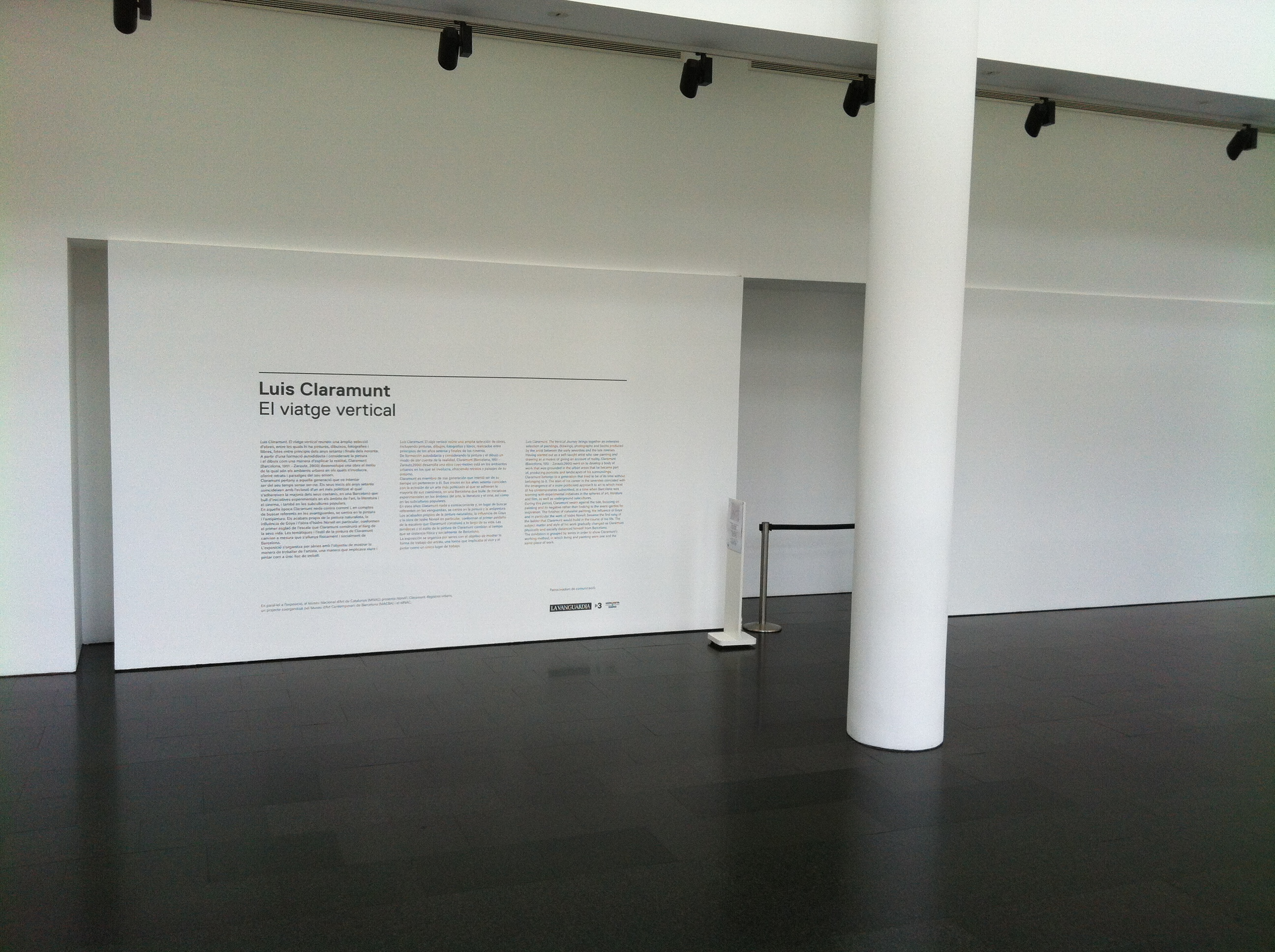
Claramunt exhibit at MACBA Barcelona.

- 1971 - Taller de Picasso, Barcelona
- 1972 - Galería Fulmen, Sevilla
- 1972 - Tur Social, Alicante
- 1972 - Peña Flamenca Enrique Morente, Barcelona
- 1973 - Taller de Picasso, Barcelona
- 1976 - Galeria Dau al Set, Barcelona
- 1979 - Galeria Dau al Set, Barcelona
- 1982 - 15 anys de pintura. Galeria Dau al Set, Barcelona
- 1984 - Galeria 4 Gats, Palma
- 1984 - ARCO 84, estand Galeria Quatre Gats, Madrid
- 1984 - Galería Buades, Madrid
- 1985 - Galería Fúcares, Almagro, Ciudad Real
- 1985 - Galeria Dau al Set, Barcelona
- 1985 - Galería Magda Bellotti, Algeciras, Cádiz
- 1985 - Galería La Máquina Española, Sevilla
- 1986 - ARCO 86, estand Galería Dau al Set, Madrid
- 1986 - Museo de Arte Contemporáneo, Sevilla
- 1987 - Galeria Sebastià Petit, Lleida
- 1987 - Galería Juana de Aizpuru, Madrid
- 1987 - 1983-1986 Pinturas. Palau Sollerich, Palma de Mallorca
- 1987 - ARCO 87, estand Galeria Dau al Set, Madrid
- 1987 - Galería Magda Bellotti, Algeciras, Cádiz
- 1987 - Galería Rafael Ortiz, Sevilla
- 1988 - ARCO 88, estand Galería Magda Bellotti, Madrid
- 1988 - Axe Art Actuel, Toulouse
- 1988 - Toro de invierno. Ateneu Mercantil, València
- 1988 - Galeria Ferran Cano, Palma de Mallorca
- 1989 - Galerie Bleich-Rossi, Graz (Austria)
- 1989 - Galería Juana de Aizpuru, Madrid
- 1989 - Galería Juana de Aizpuru, Sevilla
- 1989 - Gallery July Silvester, New York
- 1991 - Galeria Ferran Cano, Palma de Mallorca
- 1991 - Galerie Bleich-Rossi, Graz (Àustria)
- 1991 - Galeria Temple, València
- 1991 - Aschenbach Galerie, Amsterdam
- 1991 - Galeria Màcula, Alacant
- 1992 - La muela de oro. Galería Juana de Aizpuru, Madrid
- 1992 - Paisaje. Galería Juana de Aizpuru, Sevilla
- 1993 - Valderrobres. Galería Juana de Aizpuru, Madrid
- 1993 - Valderrobres. Museu Nacional de História Natural, Lisboa
- 1993 - Luis Claramunt. Galería Juana de Aizpuru, Sevilla
- 1994 - Luis Claramunt. Galería Juana de Aizpuru, Sevilla
- 1994 - Ölbilder. Galerie Bleich-Rossi, Graz (Àustria)
- 1994 - Tentadero. Galería Tomás March, València
- 1995 - Galería Antonio de Barnola, Barcelona
- 1995 - Caja Rural de Huesca, Saragossa
- 1996 - Dibujos. Galería Antonio de Barnola, Barcelona
- 1996 - Espai Sarrià, Barcelona
- 1997 - Congo money. Galería Juana de Aizpuru, Sevilla
- 1997 - Luis Claramunt. Galerie Bleich-Rossi, Graz (Àustria)
- 1997 - Galeria Antonio de Barnola, Barcelona
- 1998 - Luis Claramunt. Galerie Bleich-Rossi, Graz (Àustria)
- 1998 - Galeria Antonio de Barnola, Barcelona
- 1999 - Naufragios y tormentas. Galería Juana de Aizpuru, Madrid
- 2000 - Naufragios y tormentas. Galería Miguel Marcos, Barcelona
- 2000 - Naufragios y tormentas. Galería Juana de Aizpuru, Sevilla
- 2002 - … de Marruecos. Galería Juana de Aizpuru, Madrid
- 2009 - Marruecos. Festival Mar de Músicas, Palacio Viuda de Molina, Cartagena
- 2012 - El viatge vertical. Museu d'Art Contemporani de Barcelona, Barcelona
