= Antolín Sánchez =

Spanish politician

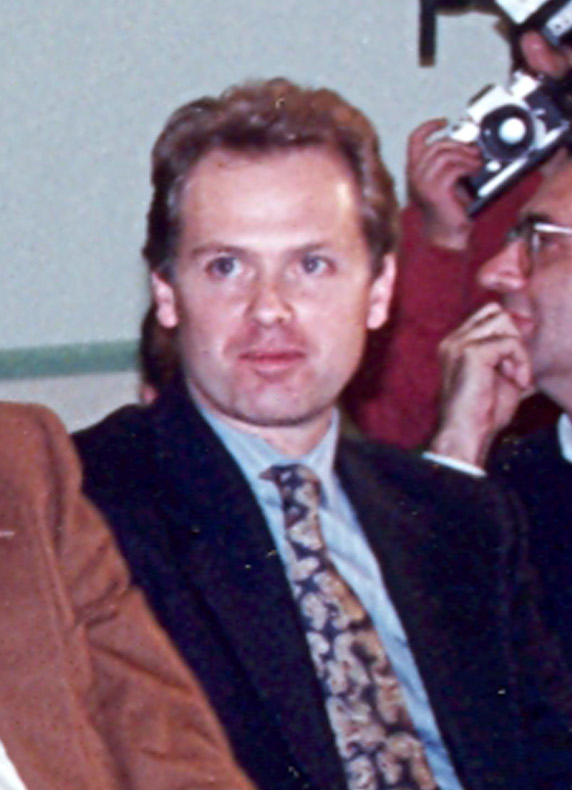
Antolín Sánchez Presedo

Antolín Sánchez Presedo (born 5 April 1955) is a Spanish politician and Member of the European Parliament for the Spanish Socialist Workers' Party, part of the Party of European Socialists.

== Early life ==
Sánchez was born in Betanzos, Galicia (Spain). He obtained an MA in EU from Derecho de la Universidad Carlos III de la Madrid (1994–96), and was a Collaborator Professor MBA at the University of A Coruña from 2001 to 2004.

== Political achievements ==
- Member of the first corporation's democratic Ayuntamiento de Betanzos from 1979 to 1983, the year in which he is elected mayor of this city.
- Member of the PSOE Federal Committee between the years 1982–1994.
- Secretary General of the PSOE-PSdeG between the years 1985–1994.
- Consejero of Planning and Public Works of the Junta of Galicia (1987-1990).
- President of the Galician Institute of Housing and Land (1988-1990).
- Spokesman of the Socialist Parliamentary Group en el Parlamento Galicia (1990-1994)
- Candidate for her presidency of the Junta of Galicia in 1993.
- Socialist MEP en el European Parliament since 2004. Member and spokesman of the Socialist Economic Affairs Committee and monetary. Member of Parliament Delegation for relations with Japan and alternate member of the delegation for relations with U.S.
