= Mario Lloret =

Spanish swimmer

Personal information
- Born: September 6, 1957 (age 68)

Sport
- Sport: Swimming
- Strokes: Butterfly

Mario Lloret (born 6 September 1957) is a Spanish former swimmer who competed in the 1976 Summer Olympics.
