= Daniel Astrain =

Spanish footballer

Personal information
- Full name: Daniel Astrain Egozkue
- Date of birth: 29 March 1948 (age 78)
- Place of birth: Pamplona, Spain
- Position: Defender

Senior career*
Years	Team	Apps	(Gls)
1968–1969	Oberena		
1969–1972	Bilbao Athletic	55	(0)
1972–1979	Athletic Bilbao	182	(3)
1979–1980	Oviedo	9	(0)
Total		246	(3)
- * Club domestic league appearances and goals

Daniel Astrain Egozkue (born 29 March 1948) is a Spanish retired footballer who played as a defender.

== Club career ==
Born in Pamplona, Navarre, Astrain joined Athletic Bilbao in 1969, from local CD Oberena. He spent nearly three full seasons with the reserves, making his first competitive appearance with the first team on 16 January 1972 by playing the full 90 minutes in a 2–1 away win against RCD Español.

Astrain scored his first league goal for the Lions on 5 November 1972, but in a 2–3 loss at Real Zaragoza. He was regularly played the club since being promoted to the main squad, going on to eventually appear in 222 games all competitions comprised (four goals).

Astrain retired in 1980 at the age of 32, after one season in Segunda División with Real Oviedo.

== Honours ==
Athletic Bilbao

- Copa del Rey: 1972–73
