= María Josefa Segovia Morón =

Venerable María Josefa Segovia Morón
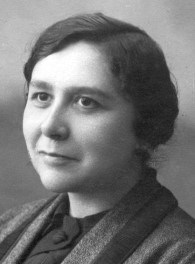
- Born: 10 October 1891; Jaén, Kingdom of Spain
- Died: 29 March 1957 (aged 65); Madrid, Francoist Spain

María Josefa Segovia Morón (10 October 1891 — 29 March 1957) was a Spanish Roman Catholic and the co-founder of the Teresian Institute that she established alongside Pedro Poveda Castroverde. Morón devoted her life to the functioning of the institute in Spain and served as its first director until her death. Pope Benedict XVI proclaimed Morón as venerable on 19 December 2005.

== Life ==
María Josefa Segovia Morón was born in Spain on 10 October 1891 to Manuel Segovia Rubio and María de los Dolores Morón. In 1913 she graduated from the La Escuela Superior del Magisterio in Madrid and returned to her hometown after this. It was there that she met Saint Pedro Poveda Castroverde who — upon learning about her — invited her to serve as the director of an institute that he wished to open; she was 22 and did not consider this to be an impediment despite what she perceived as potential inexperience. Morón accepted and the two went on to establish the Teresian Institute. She also began to pinpoint the areas the institute would focus on; Poveda said to her in 1922 in public: "You embody the spirit of the Teresian Institute".

Morón abandoned plans to live the conventional life to instead devote herself to the maintenance and the direction of the numerous academies of the institute that were opening across Spain. She presented this to Pope Pius XI in a private audience in Rome on 11 January 1924 and received the canonical approval after having received initial ecclesiastical approval back in 1917. Morón served as the institute's first director.

In 1936 she learned that her friend Poveda had been killed during the Spanish Civil War — which had started the month Poveda was killed — and she wrote of it to the institute not long after. She then had to grapple with directing the institute alone. She helped to prepare the beatification cause of Poveda and was one of the main witnesses called.

Morón died on 29 March 1957 following an operation. Following her death the Archbishop of Madrid Casimiro Morcillo González said that her holiness would soon be recognized — this prompted calls for a beatification process.

== Beatification process ==
The beatification process commenced under Pope Paul VI on 10 October 1966 after being accorded with the title of Servant of God and the commencement of an informative process that concluded its work on 16 July 1973. Morón's spiritual writings received the approval of 26 November 1976 as being orthodox and not in contradiction of the faith while on 27 January 1995 the Congregation for the Causes of Saints validated the informative process.

The Congregation assumed possession of the positio and tasked theologians to evaluate it before the Congregation themselves voted on its contents. On 19 December 2005, Morón was proclaimed to be Venerable after Pope Benedict XVI acknowledged her life of heroic virtue. A miracle attributed to her intercession was investigated in Spain and was validated in Rome on 8 November 1999 while a medical board met and approved the miracle a decade later on 15 January 2009. The postulator that is assigned to the cause is Encarnación González Rodríguez.
