= Paloma Tortajada =

Spanish journalist (1969–2019)

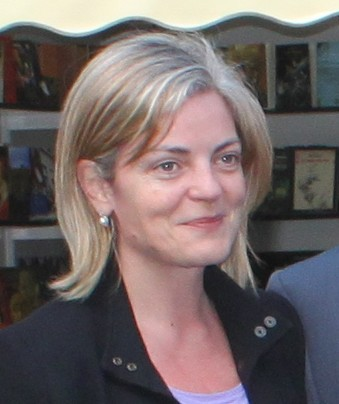
- Tortajada in 2010
- Born: Paloma Tortajada Lorente; 9 August 1969; Zaragoza, Aragon, Spain
- Died: 25 April 2019 (aged 49); Madrid, Spain
- Occupations: Journalist; Broadcaster

Paloma Tortajada Lorente (9 August 1969 – 25 April 2019) was a Spanish journalist and radio and television broadcaster. She firstly worked at Radio Popular de Zaragoza (now called COPE Zaragoza) in Zaragoza before becoming head of news of Antena 3 Radio Aragón. Tortajada worked at Cadena SER from 1992 to 2005 and then was head of society at Cuatro and CNN+ between 2006 and 2009. She was lead press officer of the Ministry of Education under Ángel Gabilondo and then returned to Cadena COPE in 2013.

== Early life and education ==
On 9 August 1969, Tortajada was born in Zaragoza, Aragon, Spain. She began listening to the radio with her parents from an early age. Tortajada was a graduate of the University of the Basque Country with a degree in Information Sciences.

== Career ==
Following her graduation, she began her career at Radio Popular de Zaragoza (now called COPE Zaragoza) in Zaragoza and was mentored in the world of journalism by María José Cabrera. Tortajada later became head of news at Antena 3 Radio Aragón. In 1992, she began working at Cadena SER in Madrid for half a year on behalf of PRISA and was co-ordinator of Hoy por hoy alongside Iñaki Gabilondo for 13 years. Tortajada was also the deputy director of Hora 14 with José Antonio Marcos. She covered events such as the September 11 attacks and the Death of Pope John Paul II.

When the television station Cuatro was launched, Tortajada decided to switch from radio to television in mid-2005 and worked as the head of society at Cuatro and CNN+ from 2006 to 2009. Following this period, she was appointed to become the lead press officer of the Ministry of Education under Ángel Gabilondo. Tortajada remained at the Ministry of Education until 2013 when she returned to Cadena COPE. She became a member of the La mañana team, firstly working with Ernesto Sáenz de Buruaga in the morning, then with Ángel Expósito (also in the morning) and finally with Carlos Herrera as co-ordinator of Herrera's evening news programme. In July 2017, Tortajada replaced Herrera on the programme and she was replaced by Marta Ruiz Blázquez the following month.

Tortajada was the presenter of the Aragón TV programme Tal como somos. In March 2017, she and three friends opened the La Tres Catorce book store in Madrid because she wanted to disseminating collections of books to homes in the city.

== Illness and death ==
Tortajada took time off work due to illness and briefly returned to work on 2 January 2019. She died of lung cancer in Madrid on the morning of 25 April 2019. Tortajada's funeral took place at the Parroquia de Santa Rita, Zaragoza the following day.
