= María Isabel Salinas =

Spanish politician

María Isabel Salinas García (born 23 June 1966) is a Spanish politician and Member of the European Parliament for the Spanish Socialist Workers' Party, part of the Party of European Socialists.

Salinas was born in Níjar. In addition to her present role, she also sat in the Spanish parliament from 1996 to 2000, representing Almería Province.
