= Ana M. Briongos =

Spanish author (1946–2024)

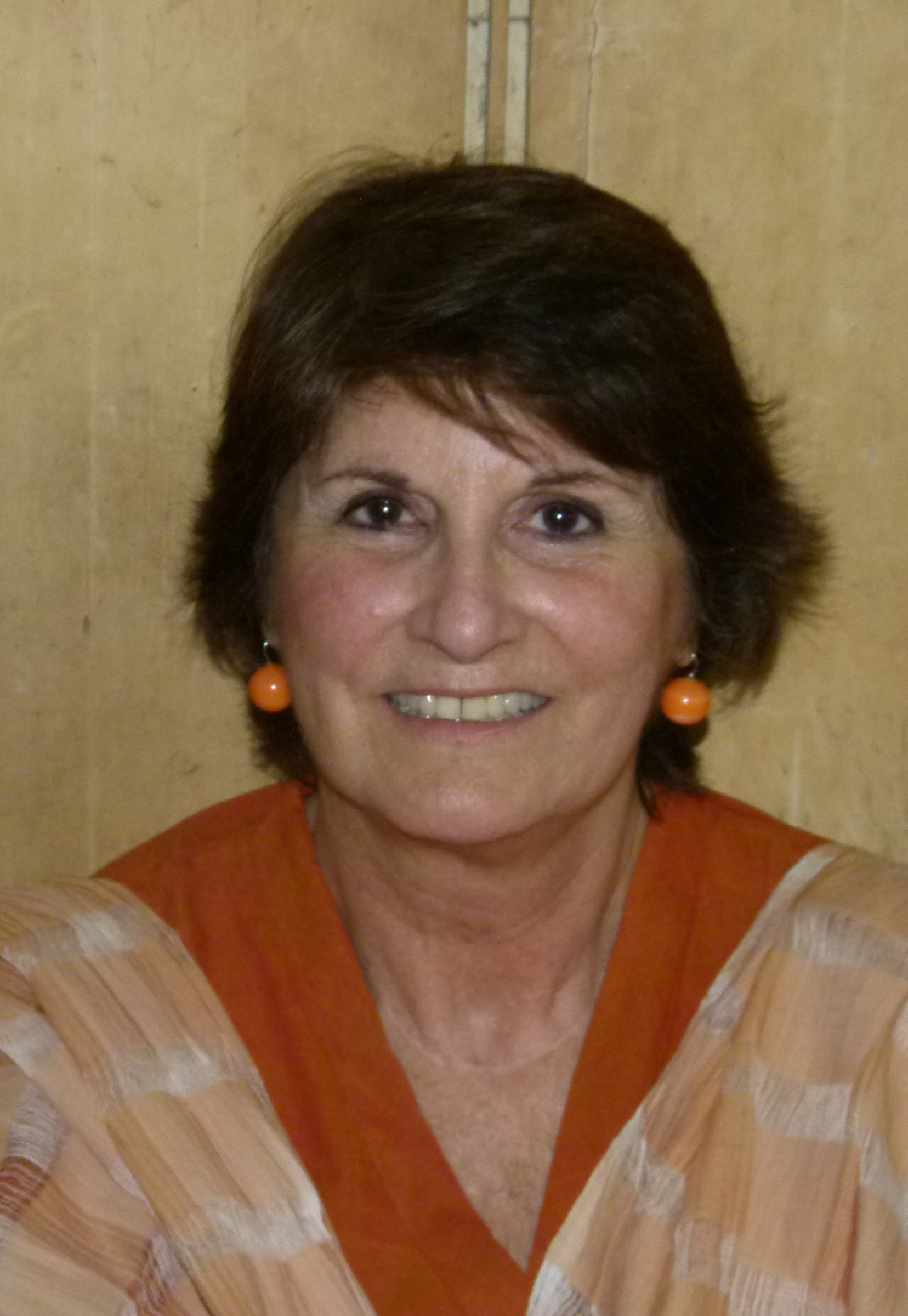
- Born: 29 December 1946; Barcelona, Spain
- Died: 25 June 2024 (aged 77)
- Occupation: Writer
- Known for: Ana María Briongos, Ana Briongos
- Notable work: Winter in Kandahar: Life in Afghanistan Before the Taliban
- Awards: Gourmand Award 2009, Annual Latino Book Award 2009
- Website: Home page, blog

Ana M. Briongos (29 December 1946 – 25 June 2024), also known as Ana Briongos or Ana María Briongos, was a Spanish lecturer and writer.

== Biography ==
She finished a five-year degree in physics at the University of Barcelona. Later she studied Persian at the University of Tehran during the time of the Shah, and worked in Iran and Afghanistan.

She came back to Spain and for ten years she was the director of Interway, an Organisation for International Student Exchange. After the Iranian Revolution she became acquainted with post-revolutionary Iran from Isfahan, where she worked in a carpet store in the city's bazaar while she was writing her third book. She then went to India and lived in Calcutta for several years.

Briongos felt the need to tell what she had seen, lived, and felt in these countries. As a result, she wrote six books in Spanish and Catalan, which have been translated into several languages, all of them explaining daily life and the experiences of everyday people, with the idea that information should not remain only in the hands of television cameras, journalists, and anthropologists.

She gave lectures and conferences at universities and social organisations.

Her book Winter in Kandahar: Life in Afghanistan Before the Taliban won the 2009 Annual Latino Book Award for best travel book. Another of her books, Black on black: Iran revisited, was shortlisted for the Thomas Cook/Daily Telegraph Travel Book Award in 2001, and was one of the final six contenders.

In 2009, she won the Gourmand Award 2009 in two categories for the book Iran, receptes i costums gastronómics, written in Catalan, with Quico Alsina as co-author.

From 2013 to 2015 she was a member of the board of Sociedad Geográfica Española.

Tony Wheeler, co-founder of Lonely Planet, likes to cite, or reference, a paragraph from Black on Black, Iran revisited by Ana Briongos why young people should travel.

In October 2020 she was the presenter of the program 'Va passar aquí' on the History and curiosities of the city of Barcelona, a television channel Betevé on 'La casa dels hippies, un edificio singular' built in Barcelona in 1970 by the architects Lluís Clotet and Òscar Tusquets, inhabited by artists and liberal people who made the building a symbol of Barcelona's counterculture.

Briongos died on 25 June 2024 at the age of 77.

== Bibliography ==
- Winter in Kandahar: Life in Afghanistan Before the Taliban
- Black on Black: Iran Revisited
- La caverna di Alì Babà. L'Iran giorno per giorno
- Iran W jaskini Ali Baby
- A caverna de Ali-Babá
- Mijn leven in Iran - De bazaar van Isfahan
- Der grot van Alí Baba - Een lente in Isfahan
- L'enigma de la Pe Pi
- ¡Esto es Calcuta!
- Iran Receptes i costums gastronòmics
- Geografías íntimas
- Mi cuaderno morado. El viaje más largo
