= Pedro Poveda Castroverde =

Spanish priest, educator, and martyr

Saint Pedro Poveda Castroverde
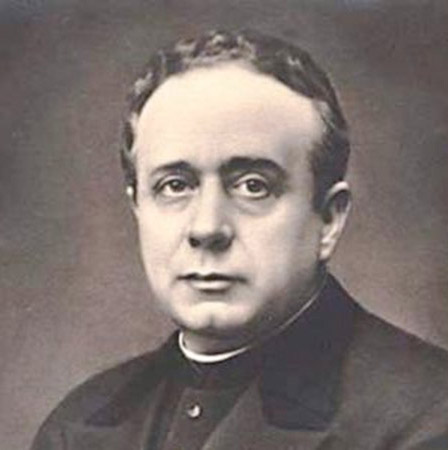

Priest and Martyr
- Born: 3 December 1874; Linares, Spain
- Died: 28 July 1936 (aged 61); Madrid, Spain
- Venerated in: Roman Catholic Church
- Beatified: 10 October 1993, Rome, Italy by Pope John Paul II
- Canonized: 4 May 2003, Madrid, Spain by Pope John Paul II
- Feast: 28 July
- Patronage: Teresian Association

Pedro Poveda (born Pedro José Luis Francisco Javier Poveda Castroverde; 3 December 1874 – 28 July 1936) was a Spanish Catholic priest, humanitarian, and educator. He was the founder of the Teresian Association. His humanitarian-educational activity lasted for over 30 years, until his execution by persecutors of the Christian faith in 1936. Poveda was beatified in 1993 and canonized in 2003; his feast day is 28 July.

== Life ==
=== Youth and scholarship ===
Pedro Poveda was born on 3 December 1874 at Linares, Spain, into the solidly Christian family of José Poveda Montes and María Linarejos Castroverde Moreno. Deciding to become a priest at a young age, he entered the seminary in Jaén in 1889, and then transferred to the seminary of Guadix, Granada, where he had been offered a scholarship by the bishop. Ordained on 17 April 1897 at the age of twenty-three, he taught at the seminary, continued his studies, and received his licentiate in theology in Seville in 1900.

=== Beginning of educational activity ===
In 1902 he was assigned to preach a Lenten mission in Guadix to the Roma people who lived in the caves. He began Christian doctrine classes, then two schools for the children. Poveda moved to the caves in order to live closer to the people. He began Christian doctrine classes, then a school for boys and girls, a dining room and evening classes for adults. He collected funds for the project, travelling through the province and to Madrid where he had good friends, and organized the St. Vincent de Paul Conferences. Convinced of the importance of education, he founded the Schools of the Sacred Heart for poor children. In 1905, due to difficulties with the acceptance of his socio-educational activities he was obliged to abandon the work in the Caves of Guadix and at the age of thirty-two accepted an appointment as a canon of the Basilica of Covadonga, Asturias.

=== Establishment of the Teresian Association, later years ===
His time in Guadix had impressed Pedro with the need for education for the poor. He began to publish articles and pamphlets on the question of the professional formation of teachers. These constitute the beginning of what later on will become the Teresian Association. The Academies were an answer to the critical situation of the times. In Spain, at the end of the nineteenth century, 68% of men and 79% of women were illiterate.

He joined the Apostolic Union of Secular Priests in 1912, wrote on the need for more teachers, and opened teacher training centers. He returned to teaching at the seminary at Jaen, served as spiritual director of Los Operarios Catechetical Centre, and taught religion at the Teachers Training School. In 1914 he opened Spain's first university residence for women in Madrid. Residences for women were opened in those places that had a university. In 1921 he was transferred to Madrid and was appointed a chaplain of the Royal Palace. In 1922 he was appointed to the Central Board Against Illiteracy, and continued to work with the Teresian Association.

== Death ==
When the Civil War broke out, he was identified as an enemy by the Socialist Republicans who wished to dechristianize the schools. A few days before his death he wrote, "Now more than ever we must study the lives of the first Christians so as to learn from them how to behave in times of persecution. See how they obeyed the Church, how they confessed Christ, how they prepared for martyrdom, how they prayed for their persecutors and forgave them...."

At dawn on 28 July 1936 a group of paramilitaries came to search his house. Fr. Pedro identified himself, saying: "I am a priest of Christ". He was shot by firing squad for his faith and for the cause of Christian education. Father Poveda was sixty-one years old.

== Veneration ==
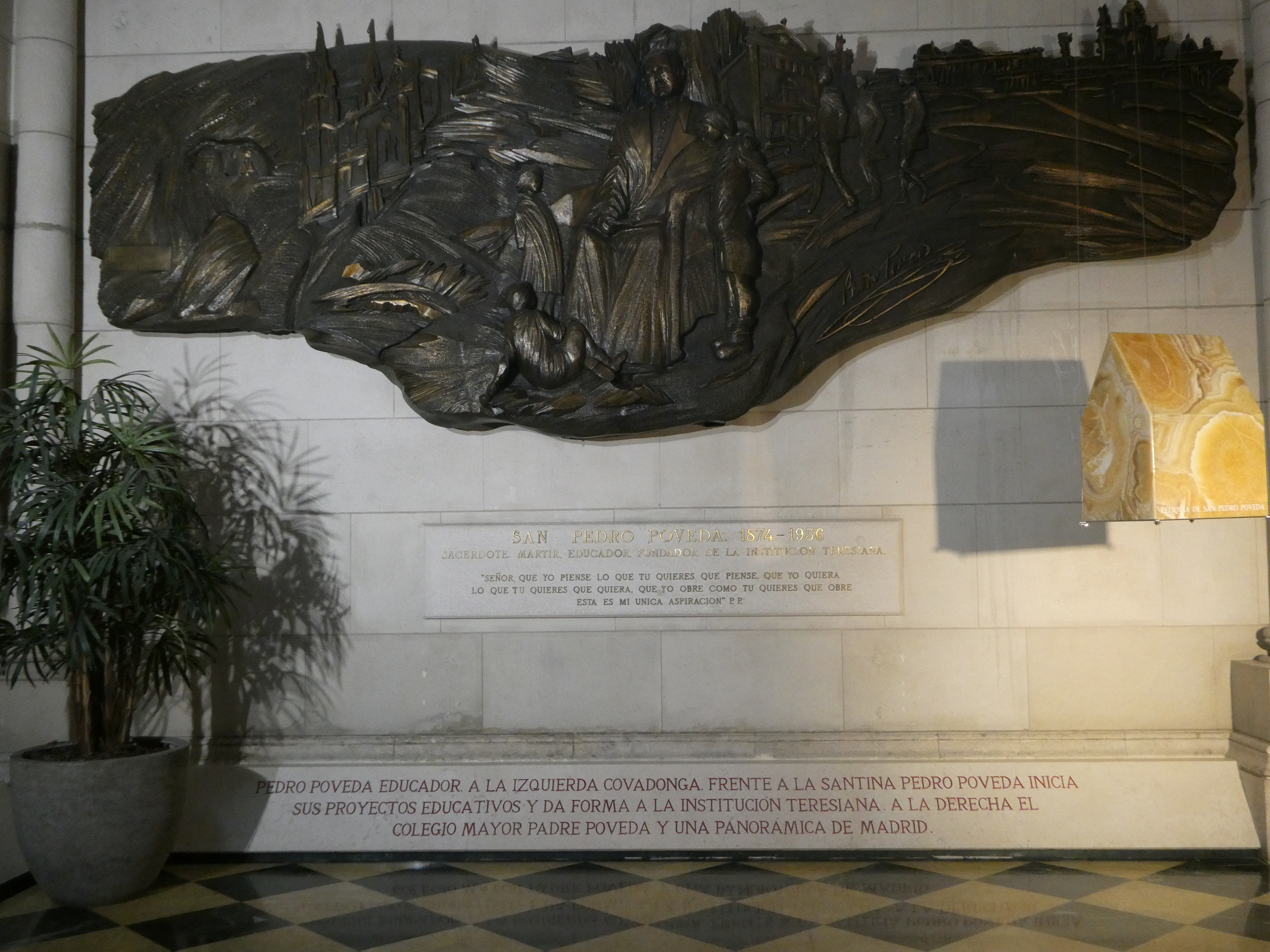
Memorial to Poveda in the Almudena Cathedral, Madrid.

He was beatified by Pope John Paul II at St. Peter's Basilica on 10 October 1993, together with Victoria Diez, a member of the Teresian Association. This association has schools around the world, including Brazil, Ireland, Philippines, India and in most South American capitals. He was canonized on 4 May 2003 by Pope John Paul II in Madrid, Spain. His work is continued by the many men, women and youth on four continents by the Teresian Association.

== Legacy ==
"St Pedro Poveda, grasping the importance of the role of education in society, undertook an important humanitarian and educational task among the marginalized and the needy. He was ... a teacher of the Christian life and of the relationship between faith and knowledge, convinced that Christians must bring essential values and commitment to building a world that is more just and mutually supportive. His life ended with the crown of martyrdom."

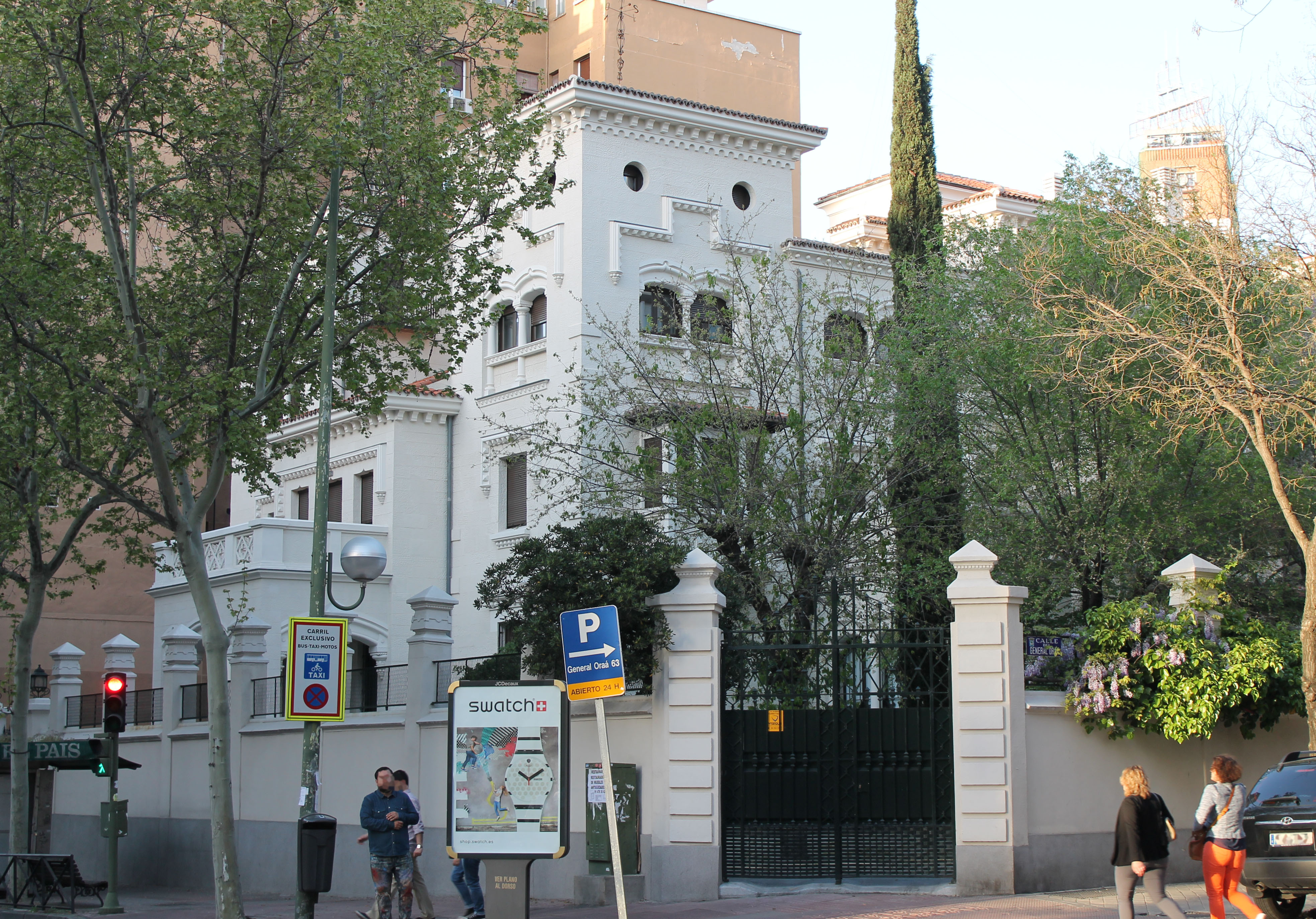
Palacete de José Goyanes Capdevila (Madrid), Headquarters of the Teresian Association

== Teresian Association ==
Poveda was deeply aware of both the need for education in his country, and for qualified teachers to provide it. He also saw this as an important role for women. In 1911 he founded the St. Teresa of Avila Academy in Oviedo for those ladies studying to become teachers, and named it after St. Teresa of Avila, a woman of learning, a doctor of the Church, and a teacher of prayer. He named this organization the Teresian Association. Its aim is to invite men and women to work for a social and human transformation, in accordance with Gospel values, from the platform of their own professions, especially those related to the fields of education and culture. The early members of the Association were women involved in all levels of education, from elementary to the provision of higher education for women. Additional academies were established in many other cities of Spain.

The Teresian Association received its first approval from the Diocese of Jaén (Spain) in 1917. In 1924, Pope Pius XI approved the Teresian Association as a "pious union of the faithful", and it later spread to Chile and Italy. In 1951 the Teresian Association was granted the status of Secular Institute. On 10 July 1990, Pope John Paul II approved that it reverts to its original identity as being an Association of the Faithful. The Teresian Association is registered in the Vatican's Dicastery for Laity, Family and Life of the Holy See. It is active in thirty countries. Its objective is the human promotion of individuals and the transformation of unjust structures by means of an education and culture imparted from a Christian perspective.

== See also ==
- Saint Pedro Poveda College, Manila
