= Trinidad Falcés =

Spanish activist for transgender rights

- Born: 1942; La Coruña
- Died: August 10, 2022 (aged 79–80); La Coruña
- Other name: La Trini
- Occupations: Activist and politician
- Awards: Marcela and Elisa award (2019)

Trinidad Falcés (La Coruña, 1942 – August 10, 2022) was a Spanish activist for transgender rights in Spain during Francoist Spain. She was the first openly trans woman in her hometown.

== Activism in Francoist Spain ==
Trinidad was able to change her name from Antoinio to Trinidad at just eleven years old in 1953. She emigrated to Barcelona, where she was arrested several times by the Francoist police, convicted and sentenced to jail for five years for breaking the Vagrancy Act. She spent several months in the Badajoz prison, a concentration camp for homosexuals.

== Post-Franco era ==
After the death of dictator Francisco Franco in 1975, Falcés led the first Barcelona pride demonstration. In the 90s, she returned to La Coruña and in 2007, was recognized as a victim of Francoism by the Historical Memory Law. In 2019, she received the Elisa y Marcela award for her work for integration and sexual diversity.

Falcés died on August 10, 2022, in La Coruña.
