= Francisca Pleguezuelos =

Spanish politician (born 1950)

Francisca Pleguezuelos Aguilar (born 28 June 1950 in Granada) was a Spanish politician and Member of the European Parliament for the Spanish Socialist Workers' Party, part of the Party of European Socialists.

She began her political career in 1989 when she was elected to the Spanish parliament representing Seville serving until 1993 and then from 2000 to 2004.
