= Miguel Lang =

Spanish swimmer

Personal information
- Born: 13 January 1956 (age 70)

Sport
- Sport: Swimming
- Strokes: Butterfly

Miguel Lang-Lenton (born 13 January 1956) is a Spanish former butterfly swimmer who competed in the 1976 Summer Olympics.
