= Alfredo Javaloyes López =

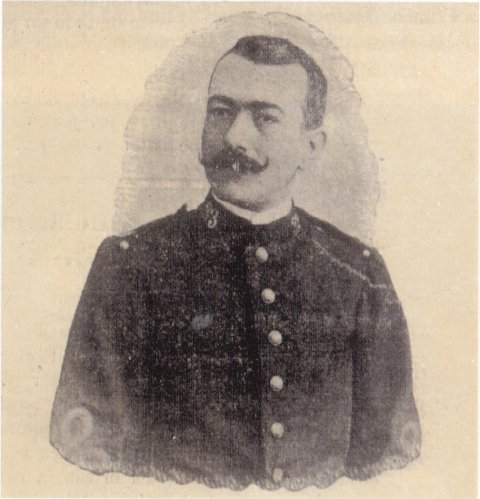
- Portrait of Alfredo Javaloyeso López

Background information
- Born: March 22, 1865; Elche, Province of Alicante, Spain
- Origin: Elx (Elche) (Valencian Community, Spain)
- Died: February 18, 1944 (aged 78) Elche
- Genres: Military march
- Occupation: Music Director

Alfredo Javaloyes López (March 22, 1865 - February 18, 1944 ) was a Spanish musician. His best known work is the military march El Abanico ("The Fan"), composed in the year 1910.

Javaloyes Lopez was born in 1865 in the town of Elche, Province of Alicante, Spain. The street where he was born now bears his name. He studied music in Barcelona in 1880 with the composers Fabio Campano and Felip Pedrell. A streetcar accident permanently disabled his left hand, ending his performing career. With the support of Pedrell, he studied to become a military music director. In 1901, he became music director to the Sevilla Regiment 33 in Cartagena. He remained in that city until 1918, when he became director of music for the hunters battalion of Barbastro (Spanish: Música del Batallón de Cazadores del Barbastro). When he retired from military life, he returned to his hometown of Elche, where he served as Director of the Municipal Band. before his death in 1944.
