= Alfonso Tusell =

Spanish water polo player (1906–1960)

Personal information
- Nationality: Spanish
- Born: 11 April 1906; Barcelona, Spain
- Died: 23 February 1960 (aged 53); Barcelona, Spain

Sport
- Sport: Water polo

Alfonso Tusell (11 April 1906 – 23 February 1960) was a Spanish water polo player. He competed in the men's tournament at the 1920 Summer Olympics.
