= Pilar Fuertes Ferragut =

Spanish diplomat

Ambassador of Spain to Zimbabwe Accredited to Malawi and Zambia
- In office 8 November 2008 – 2 April 2012
- Preceded by: Santiago Martínez-Caro de la Concha-Castañeda

Personal details
- Born: 19 July 1962 Valencia, Spain
- Died: 2 April 2012 (aged 49) Walvis Bay, Namibia
- Cause of death: Road accident
- Awards: Lady's Ribbon of the Order of Isabella the Catholic; Cross of the Order of Civil Merit

Pilar Fuertes Ferragut (19 July 1962 – 2 April 2012) was a Spanish diplomat who served as the ambassador of Spain to Zimbabwe, accredited also to Malawi and Zambia, from 2008 until her death in 2012.

== Biography ==
Fuertes Ferragut was born in Valencia, Spain, on 19 July 1962 and obtained a law degree before entering the Spanish Diplomatic Service in 1992. She was the sister of the wife of the politician Alejo Vidal-Quadras Roca. That same year, Fuertes Ferragut was appointed to serve as the director of programmes in the Subdirectorate General for Emigration in the Ministry of Foreign Affairs.

She held a variety of different positions in the Diplomatic Information Office from 1994 to 1996 and then served as the Second Head of the Spanish Embassies in Beirut (Lebanon), Jakarta (Indonesia), Bangkok (Thailand) and Guatemala between 1996 and 2003.

Fuertes Ferragut later returned to Madrid and became the deputy director for the Pacific, Southeast Asia and the Philippines in 2004, and on 30 April 2007, was appointed deputy director general for International Relations, Immigration and Aliens at the Ministry of the Interior by Antonio Camacho Vizcaíno, the Secretary of State for Security. She was appointed the second head of the Spanish Embassy in Cairo, Egypt in April 2008, and was made ambassador to Zimbabwe on 8 November 2008. On 26 September 2009, Fuertes Ferragut was appointed the Spanish ambassador to Malawi by the Government of Spain through a Royal Decree. She worked to construct working relations in the area of arts and culture between Spain and Zimbabwe and hosted multiple functions for local journalists, informing them of problems in Spain. Fuertes Ferragut arranged cultural events such as at the Harare International Festival of the Arts and the Harare Agricultural Show.

She was appointed by Royal Decree as the Spanish ambassador to Zambia by Juan Carlos I on 12 June 2010 following a proposal being made by Miguel Ángel Moratinos, the Minister of Foreign Affairs and Cooperation, and discussions with the Council of Ministers. In 1998, Fuertes Ferragut was decorated with the Lady's Ribbon of the Order of Isabella the Catholic and received the Cross of the Order of Civil Merit six years later.

== Death ==
On the afternoon of 2 April 2012, she was spending a short holiday in Namibia when she was killed in a traffic accident in which her car overturned and rolled multiple times close to the coastal town of Walvis Bay. As a result, the Spanish Embassy in Zimbabwe was closed and cultural events cancelled before a book of condolence was opened from 6 to 10 April. Fuertes Ferragut's body would be repatriated to Spain, and her funeral took place at the parish church of the Carmelites in Madrid on 12 April 2012.

== Legacy ==
In April 2022, the Ministry of Foreign Affairs hosted the exhibition Spirit of Friendship. Between Two Waters that featured works by artists from Zimbabwe in tribute to Fuertes Ferragut.
