= Javier Melloni =

Italian-Catalan anthropologist and theologian (born 1962)

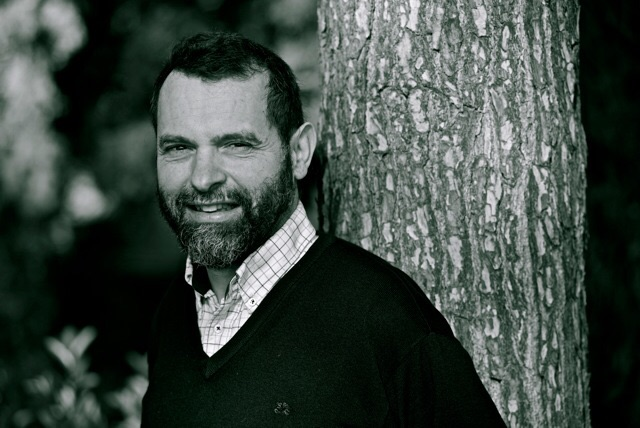
- Born: 23 March 1962 (age 64); Barcelona, Catalonia
- Occupations: Jesuit priest, author
- Known for: Spiritual writings and interreligious dialogue Ignatian spirituality

Javier Melloni Ribas is an Italian-Catalan Jesuit anthropologist and theologian.

== Biography ==
Javier Melloni Ribas was born in Barcelona in 1962; his mother is Catalan and his father, Italian. At 18 he joined the Society of Jesus He became a Jesuit priest, graduated with a degree in cultural anthropology and obtained a PhD inTheology. He currently lives in the Cueva de San Ignacio in Manresa, Catalonia.

== Career ==
Melloni is a Jesuit who became interested in the Ignatius spiritual exercises and acquired thorough knowledge of religious texts. He is a member of Cristianisme i Justícia, a professor of Spiritual Theology in the Faculty of Theology of Catalonia and in the Institute of Fundamental Theology in Sant Cugat. His specializes in interreligious dialogue and comparative mysticism.

He is on the editorial board of journals such as Manresa (a journal of Ignatian spirituality) and Diagonal (a journal of interreligious dialogue). He is the author of essays on different topics focused on spirituality, theology, interreligious dialogue and comparative mysticism. These publications present his theoretical and practical exercises.

== Religious perspective ==
- Interreligious dialogue

Javier Melloni is well known for being a theologian who practices, theorizes and reflects about interreligious dialogue. Melloni proofs the proverb: extra Ecclesiam nulla salus (outside church there is no salvation) This expression was first formulated by St. Cipriano de Cartago(288): it was resumed and strengthened in the fourteenth century by Boniface VIII in his Bull Unam Sanctam (1302), and submits it to the next level distanced from the actual religion in order to find essential contact points passing through many religions, and that raises them in a purely spiritual way. The ultimate goal is to give Javier Melloni that "respect and acceptance of others, reflecting the opening and donation to Another".

Melloni’s theoretical background involves anthropological, sociological, epistemological and theological factors. For him, the interreligious dialogue is a normal dialogue that needs the participants’ willingness to be open-minded and to detach from themselves in order to enable the existence of others.

Based on his ideology, Javier Melloni states that the interreligious dialogue has two main results: 1) the assumption that religious confession leads to mystery, and 2) with that assumption, people can embrace the spiritual wealth of humanity.

- Comparative Mysticism

Javier Melloni has studied comparative mysticism as a complement to interreligious dialogue. He has established that the profound meaning of religious mysticism does not imply an evasion of the actual world but the opportunity of being self-transformed throughout the most significant religious aspects. Comparative mysticism involves a journey through the mystical experiences that every religion has.

== Work ==
- Los caminos del corazón. El conocimiento espiritual en la Filocalia. Sal Terrae. 1995. ISBN 978-84-293-1148-8.
- The Exercises of Saint Ignatius Loyola in the Western Tradition. Leominster & New Malden (GB): Gracewing & Inigo Enterprises. 2000. ISBN 978-0-85244-527-3.
- La mistagogía de los Ejercicios Espirituales de san Ignacio. Sal Terrae. 2001. ISBN 978-84-271-2361-8.
- El Uno en lo Múltiple. Santander: Sal Terrae. 2003. ISBN 978-84-293-1515-8.
- Relaciones humanas y relaciones con Dios. Madrid: San Pablo. 2006. ISBN 978-84-285-3015-6.
- Vislumbres de lo Real. Barcelona: Herder. 2007. ISBN 978-84-254-2530-1.
- El no-lugar del encuentro religioso. Madrid: Trotta. 2008. ISBN 978-84-9879-000-9.
- El Deseo essential. Santander: Sal Terrae. 2009. ISBN 978-84-293-1829-6.
- Voces de la mística I. Barcelona: Herder. 2009. ISBN 978-84-254-2656-8.
- El Cristo interior. Barcelona: Herder. 2010. ISBN 978-84-254-2701-5.
- Hacia un tiempo de síntesis. Barcelona: Fragmenta Editorial. 2011. ISBN 978-84-92416-424.
- Voces de la mística II. Barcelona: Herder. 2012. ISBN 978-84-254-2867-8.
- Nómadas del Absoluto. La Vida Religiosa ante el diálogo interreligioso. Vol. 80. Vitoria. 2012. ISSN 1138-2325.
- Sed de Ser. Barcelona: Herder. 2013. ISBN 978-84-254-3209-5.
- The Exercises of Saint Ignatius and Traditions of the East. Leominster & New Malden (GB): Gracewing & Inigo Enterprises. 2013. ISBN 978-0-85244-769-7.
