= María Jimena Pérez =

Argentine volleyball player (born 1984)

Personal information
- Full name: María Jimena Pérez
- Nationality: Argentinian
- Born: 4 June 1984 (age 42)
- Hometown: Buenos Aires
- Height: 1.76 m (5 ft 9 in)
- Weight: 84 kg (185 lb)
- Spike: 290 cm (114 in)
- Block: 275 cm (108 in)

Volleyball information
- Current club: Velez Sarsfield

National team
2011	Argentina

María Jimena Pérez (born 2 June 1984) is an Argentine volleyball player who is a member of the Argentina national team.

== Career ==
She participated at the 2011 FIVB Volleyball Women's World Cup.
