= José Jurado de la Parra =

Spanish writer

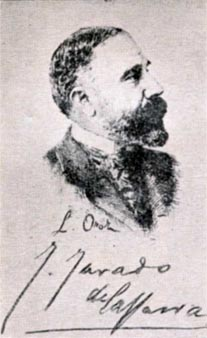
José Jurado de la Parra, from a 1933 book

José Jurado de la Parra (Baeza, Spain February 8, 1856 – Málaga, Spain July 21, 1943) was a Spanish journalist, poet and playwright. He was the son of Juan Antonio Jurado Gámez and María de las Dolores de la Parra Segura. He had two brothers, Andrés (Baeza 1852-Madrid 1936), a military doctor and writer, and Anacleta. He was a disciple of Campoamor and Pérez Galdós and a close friend of José Zorrilla and Blasco Ibáñez, as well as Antonio Fernández Grilo, a poet from Córdoba. He arrived in Madrid in 1870, the same day, December 28, that General Prim was assassinated on Calle del Turco.

The seventies were spent between Madrid, Málaga and his native Baeza, where he collaborated with several magazines, among which La Semana stands out, and where he graduated with a bachelor's degree in 1880. In Málaga he collaborated with the newspaper Eco de la Juventud .

In these years his friendship was born, not without gallantry, with the poet and countrywoman from Begíjar, a town a few kilometers from Baeza, Patrocinio de Biedma y la Moneda, founder and director of Cádiz, where Jurado de la Parra also published. In the early eighties, she collaborated intensely with the Ateneo de la juventud de Linares .

Around 1887 he settled in Granada, where he would collaborate in El Defensor de Granada and El Noticiero Granadino and was appointed secretary of the literature section of El Liceo de Granada . In 1889 he collaborated very actively in the coronation in Granada of José Zorrilla as prince of the national poets, being his mayor in the Alhambra palace and secretary of the qualifying jury of the literary contest that opened the Liceo de Granada .

In October 1895, his work Sincerity premiered in Madrid; His fraternal friendship with Jacinto Benavente dates from this time, who dedicated his comedy Gente conocida to him .

He collaborated since its founding by Joaquín Dicenta in the weekly Germinal, which came to light on April 30, 1897 and extended his life by two years; its first editorial board included Francisco Maceín and Ernesto Bark . Shortly after he would join the newsroom himself.

In 1898, a month after the « Disaster », he founded with Eusebio Blasco the weekly Vida Nueva, in which Unamuno would write two well-known articles, «Muera Don Quixote» and «Renovación». He was secretary of the Literature section of the Ateneo de Madrid, being its president Antonio Cánovas del Castillo .

In 1901, he read his dramatic work Don Juan de Austria at the premises of the Association of Spanish Writers and Artists . In 1902, on December 20, he premiered his work De él Don Juan de Austria at the Teatro Lírico in Madrid .

In 1908 he collaborated with "Los Lunes" from El Imparcial . On April 3, 1910, he premiered El eterno burlador at the Spanish Theater in Madrid .

He was a regular, in the early years of the 20th century, at Jacinto Benavente 's social gathering at the El Gato Negro café, on Calle del Príncipe, next to the Teatro de la Comedia, which also included Pedro Zorrilla, Manolo González, Bonafé, Tirso Escudero, Nilo Fabra, Juan Espantaléon, Martínez Sierra, Antonio Palomero, Antonio Paso, Joaquín Abati, Pedro Mata and Enrique Amado.

He translated adapting into Spanish Stechetti, Carducci, Cavalloti, D'Annunzio, Maeterlinck, Rusiñol, Musset, Iglesias and Gaudillot.

In 1925 he retired to live in Malaga, where the great political-social poet emerged, who would recount the events of Spain until the dawn of the civil war . In his Malaga years he was a member of the Republican Alliance and collaborated with the magazine La Esfera until 1931.

The last known written reference is from 1940, in a letter dated January 15 where he supports Emilio Carrere .

The date of his death in Malaga was July 21, 1943 (a long-forgotten data provided in 2006 by Amparo Chiachío Peláez in his doctoral thesis). Both his hometown and the city of his death have dedicated streets in his name.
