= Albert Girós =

Catalan artist

Albert Girós (Barcelona, 1954) is a Catalan artist.

His first important exhibit was in 1982, when Girós work was exhibit at the Espai 10 space of the Fundació Joan Miró, under the name la solidificació de la llum. Since then, he has been working on several aspects of the sculpture.
