= Teresa Riera =

Spanish politician

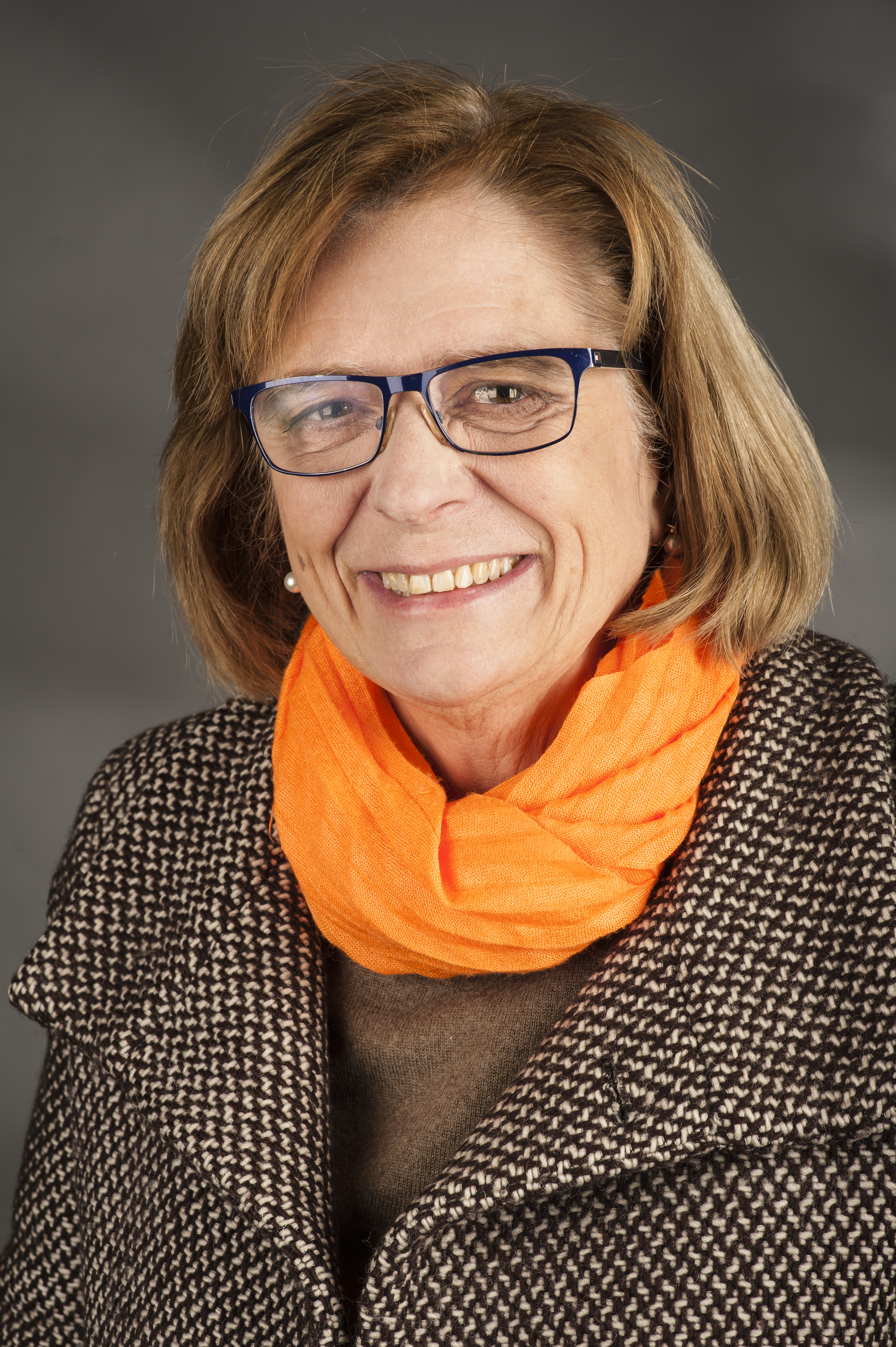
Teresa Riera Madurell

Teresa Riera Madurell (born 13 October 1950 in Barcelona) is a Spanish politician who served as a Member of the European Parliament from 2004 until 2014. She is a member of the Spanish Socialist Workers' Party, part of the Party of European Socialists.

Riera was elected to the parliament of the Balearic Islands in 1989 and then to the national parliament in 1996 as deputy for The Balearic Islands serving until 2004.

During her time in the European Parliament, Riera served as rapporteur on the EU's research programme Horizon 2020.
