= Jesús Fuentes =

Spanish swimmer

Personal information
- Born: 15 November 1957 (age 68)

Sport
- Sport: Swimming

Jesús Fuentes Urtiaga (born 15 November 1957) is a Spanish former swimmer who competed in the 1976 Summer Olympics.
