= Agustín Olguera =

Spanish painter (1906–1942)

Agustín Olguera (1906–1942) was a Spanish painter. He studied painting at the School of Painting and Sculpture at the Royal Academy of Fine Arts of San Fernando in Madrid, sharing a classroom with Salvador Dalí.

In 1930, achieved a 600 pesetas monthly scholarship from the Board for Advanced Studies Abroad, with subsequent extensions, allowing him to study painting in Paris from 1930 to 1936.
