= Nolasc Acarín Tusell =

Spanish medical doctor and writer (born 1941)

Nolasc Acarín Tusell is a Spanish medical doctor and writer. He was born in Barcelona in 1941. A specialist in neurology and psychiatry, he has written numerous journal articles and scientific books. To the wider public, he is known for his bestseller El cerebro del rey (The King's Brain). He has taught at the Universidad Pompeu Fabra and has served in numerous posts of responsibility in his profession. He is a member of the American Academy of Neurology and the Royal Society of Medicine.

He was awarded the Cruz de Sant Jordi Award in 2008 by the Generalitat de Catalunya.
