= Francisco Arias Solís =

Spanish politician (born 1941)

Francisco Arias Solís (born 30 January 1941) is a Spanish politician who represented Cadiz Province in the Spanish Senate for the Spanish Socialist Workers' Party from 1982 to 1986.
