= María Irigoyen Pérez =

Spanish politician (born 1952)

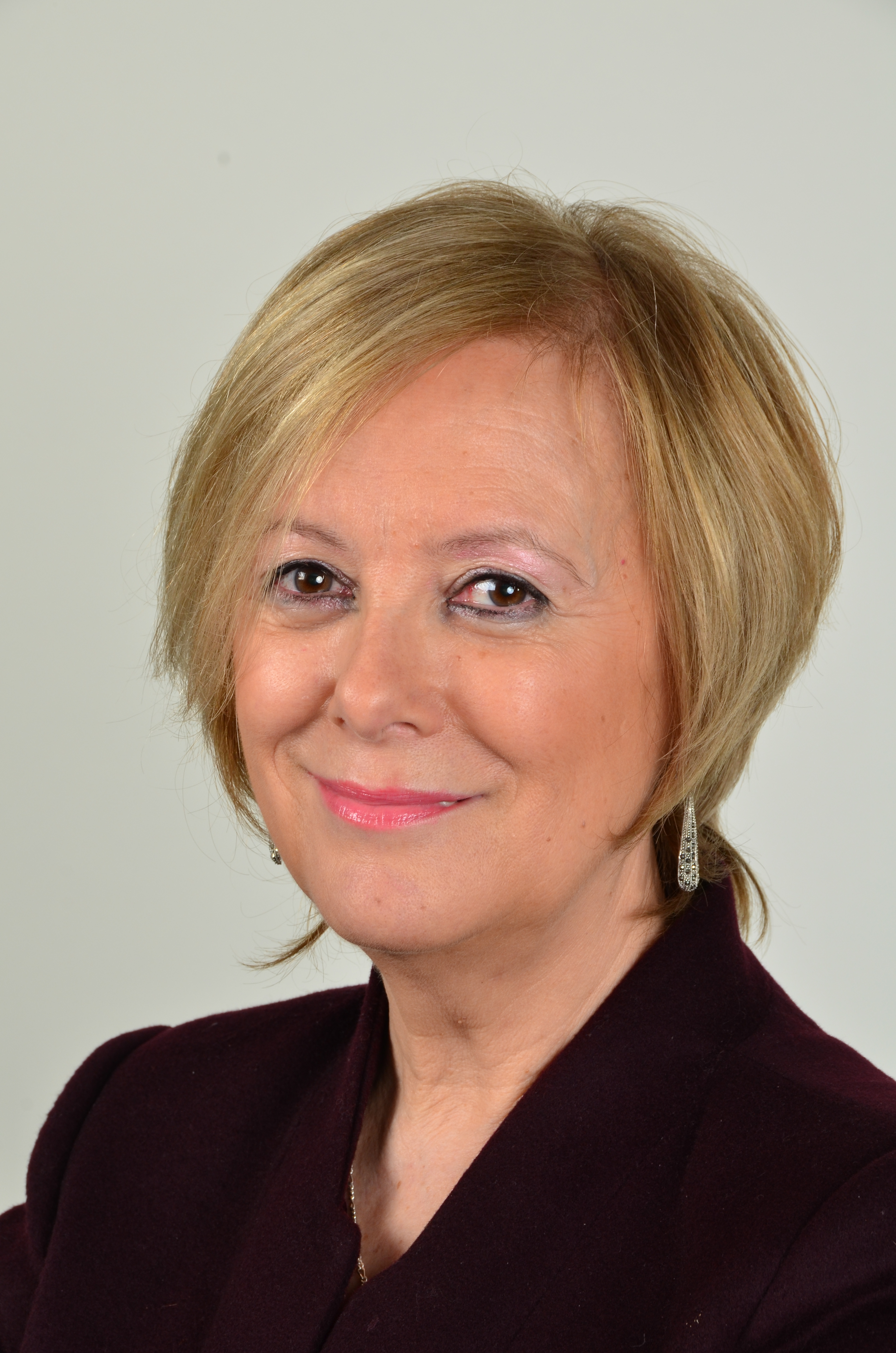
Irigoyen Pérez in February 2014

María Irigoyen Pérez (born 1 October 1952, in Soria) is a Spanish Socialist Workers' Party (PSOE) politician who served as Member of the European Parliament (MEP) from 2009 to 2014.

== Biography ==
In the general elections of December 20, 2015, she was the PSOE’s lead candidate for the Senate in the province of Soria. She was elected to the Senate in that election. She ran again in the special elections on June 26, 2016, but Jesús Manuel Alonso, mayor of Ágreda and second on the ticket, beat her by 236 votes. She was therefore not re-elected.
