= Fanny Schoonheyt =

Dutch fighter and photographer (1912–1961)

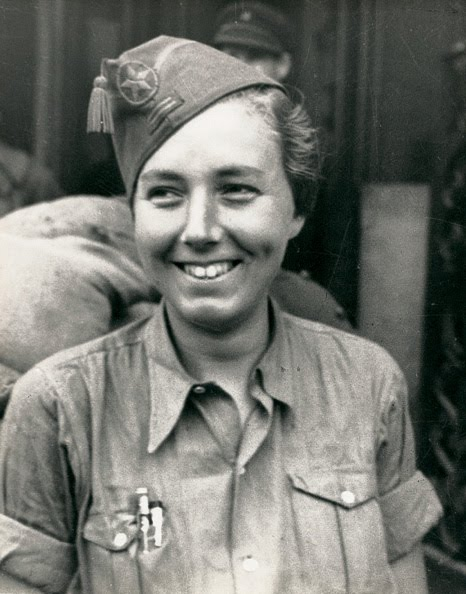
- Born: Fernanda Wilhelmina Maria Albertina Schoonheyt; 15 June 1912; Rotterdam, Netherlands
- Died: 23 December 1961 (aged 49); Rotterdam, Netherlands
- Military career
- Service years: 1936–1939
- Rank: Lieutenant
- Conflicts: Spanish Civil War

Fernanda Wilhelmina Maria Albertina "Fanny" Schoonheyt (15 June 1912 – 23 December 1961), was a Dutch journalist, photographer and Communist foreign volunteer who fought in the Spanish Civil War.

== Early life ==
Schoonheyt was born on 15 June 1912 in Rotterdam, Netherlands. Her parents were Jules Alphonse Schoonheijt and Johanna Maria Luise Gehring. She came from a wealthy family, but later became estranged from them due to her Socialist and Communist beliefs.

== Time in Spain ==
In the early 1930s Schoonheyt, who wanted to become a foreign correspondent, left the Netherlands to live in Barcelona, Spain, and lived with Surinamese-Dutch writer Albert Helman. She had left the Netherlands because she felt that newspapers there only wanted her to write about music and culture rather than about politics. She helped with the preparations for the Olimpiada Popular in Barcelona, an alternative for the Olympic Games which was in Nazi-Germany in 1936; however, the Barcelona Olympiad never took place due to the outbreak of the war. She joined a militia in 1936 and was sent to fight on the Aragon front and at Tardienta, and learned to fire machine guns from German communists. In September 1936 she was injured, or possibly shell shocked, and was hospitalised. In the summer of 1938 she went to Paris to train to become a pilot but was not able to return to Spain before the Nationalist victory. Subsequently Schoonheyt was stripped of her nationality by the Francoist regime and subsequently emigrated to the Dominican Republic in February 1940.

== Dominican Republic & Later Life ==
After getting in trouble with Dominican police in 1947, Schoonheyt got permission from the Dutch Consulate for a temporary stay on the then Dutch colony of Curaçao where she worked as a photographer under the name Fanny Lopez. Around 1955 she returned to the Netherlands with her daughter, who had been conceived in 1938, and lived with her mother in Rotterdam.

She died of a heart attack in Rotterdam on 23 December 1961.
