= Del Águila family killings =

1965–1966 killings in Spain

del Águila family killings
- Piedad lying on a hospital bed next to a surviving sister, talking with journalist Francisco Umbral.
- Location: Carril de la Farola, Murcia, Spain
- Date: 4 December 1965 – 4 January 1966
- Weapon: Poison
- Deaths: 4
- Victim: 4
- Perpetrator: Piedad Martínez del Águila
- Motive: Resentment over childcare duties

From 4 December 1965 to 4 January 1966, 12-year-old Piedad Martínez del Águila allegedly killed her four youngest siblings by poisoning in Murcia, Spain. She reportedly killed them after becoming frustrated at being forced to take care of them. Although doctors concluded she was a psychopath who acted in premeditated malice, Piedad claimed the first three children killed were on her mother's orders. Piedad could not be tried due to her age, and was sent to live in a convent. The case gained prominence in Spanish media, being dubbed "The Case of the Murcian Children".

== Background ==
Piedad Martínez del Águila was born as the third child and first daughter to Andrés Martínez del Águila, a bricklayer working in construction, and Antonia Pérez Díaz, who worked odd jobs. At the age of 12, she had two older siblings, Antonio, 16, and Manuel, 14, and seven younger siblings, Jesús, 10, Cristina, 8, Manuela, 6, (Note: Also reported as "Manolita".) Andrés, 5, Fuensanta, 4, Mariano, 2, and Mari Carmen, 9 months old. Her mother was seven months pregnant. The family lived in Carril, Villagarcía de Arosa, Spain. Piedad did not go to school, instead helping her mother with housework and taking care of her siblings. She wanted to become a hairdresser in adulthood. Her two oldest brothers worked jobs. The family originally lived in a shack in Algezares, and had been living in an apartment for two years at the time of the incident. They lived in the first house in the Casas del Carmen apartment complex.

== Killings ==
On 4 December 1965, 9-month-old Mari Carmen was found dead. She had seizures at five months old, which had been treated. On the day of her death, similar symptoms were seen. Her death was initially diagnosed as being from meningitis; another infant from the family had died of the disease five years previously. Five days later, Mariano died. His death was also deemed to have been caused by meningitis. After Fuensanta's death five days after Mariano's, suspicions arose. The family doctor, Antonio Guillamón, refused to sign a death certificate. The family were admitted to the Provincial Hospital of Murcia for observation, and were discharged by Christmas due to their good health. On 4 January 1966, at 9 am, Andrés died at the age of five.

== Investigation and discovery ==
Andrés' and Fuensanta's organs were sent to the Carlos III Health Institute for testing, in which no virus was detected. On 11 January 1966, traces of poison was found in the organs of Andrés. All four bodies were exhumed from the Nuestro Padre Jesús cemetery in Espinardo, and it was concluded that all were poisoned similarly. Traces of DDT and potassium cyanide were found in their bodies. Following this, the parents Andrés and Antonia were ordered to be imprisoned. Antonia was held in the San Juan de Dios Hospital due to her pregnancy, and Andrés had his mental state evaluated at the El Palmar Psychiatric Center.

The parents denied any poisonous substances being inside of the house. After the news of the poisoning became public, Piedad became ill and quiet. The parents believed that the children were killed by people from outside of the family. Antonia sympathised with Piedad, telling interviewers that she was the last person seen by the siblings before their deaths. She also claimed Piedad could not understand the full extent of the situation due to her age.

Piedad became a suspect due to her being in charge of taking care of the children and feeding them. An investigator pretended to put chloride into a glass of milk for Piedad while questioning her, to which she became angry and stopped him. When he insisted Piedad drink it, she refused. Following the investigator asking her if it was similar to what she gave her siblings, she confessed to the crimes, claiming that the first three siblings she killed were on her mother's orders, and the last one on her own terms. Piedad recounted that Fuensanta was the only one who spoke during the poisoning, saying "Piedad, come quickly. I'm dying". She said she committed the poisoning through homemade balls of rat poison and tablets used to clean metal, then putting it into glasses of milk. All children died within an hour.

Piedad, having become frustrated at being forced to take care of her younger siblings, began poisoning the youngest children in order to have more free time and to play with her friends. Following her confession, she was admitted to a psychiatric hospital and gave several differing versions of events. She maintained that her mother persuaded her to poison the first three children. Doctors at the hospital concluded that she was a psychopath and acted with premeditated malice. Although she was the sole perpetrator of the four deaths, as a minor, she could not be indicted. Following a brief stay at the Juvenile Court, she joined the Oblates' convent in Murcia.

== Aftermath ==
The incident gained notoriety in local media, being dubbed "The Case of the Murcian Children". Unfounded rumours that the children died from suffocation after having pillows pressed on their faces circulated prior to the discovery of the poisoning. The case generated extensive discussion throughout Spain. During her time at the Oblates' convent, Piedad was reportedly happy and enjoyed knitting. She expressed desires to live with an aunt, Lola, who had no children. The family was shunned following the crimes, and Andrés Sr. worked as a garbage collector in his later life, eventually becoming blind. Piedad's two oldest brothers would go on to commit petty crimes. No information on Piedad following her commitment to the convent is known.
