= Juan de Hinojosa Ferrer =

Spanish judge and writer (1886–1955)

Juan de Hinojosa Ferrer (Madrid, 1886 — 6 March 1955, Madrid) was a Spanish Supreme Court judge and writer specialized in labour law. He was a member of the Instituto de Reformas Sociales.

== Biography ==
In 1886, he was born in Madrid, son of Eduardo de Hinojosa y Naveros.

In 1906, he earned his doctorate of law at the University of Madrid. In 1907, he went to the French Third Republic to study the Catholic social movement there and, from 1907 to 1909, the labour movement, translating French sources to Spanish for the Center of Catholic Publications. His association with the Catholic Church in Spain continued throughout his life, being a conference president of the Society of Saint Vincent de Paul at St Sebastian's Church, Madrid and a member of the Brothers of Refuge.

In 1909, he joined the technical staff of the Instituto de Reformas Sociales, becoming a judge in 1915. In the 1920s, he served in Zaragoza, Aragon, presiding over Archbishop of Zaragoza Juan Soldevila y Romero's murder case.

On 26 July 1943, the Superior Council for the Protection of Minors and his presidency over it were promulgated; he resigned in 1952 due to poor health. From 1944, he was on the Supreme Court, additionally serving on the Court of Political Responsibilities and its liquidation commission. On 2 June 1953, he was elected academician of the Real Academia de Ciencias Morales y Políticas, but failed to present his acceptance speech on 28 May 1954, with his death on 6 March 1955 in Madrid preventing his admission.

He was awarded the Grand Cross of the Order of Civil Merit and the Order of Saint Raymond of Peñafort.

== Works ==
Among published articles in the Catholic Madrileño newspaper El Universo, collaborations in Revista Católica de Gestiones Sociales, and similar publications his bibliography entails:

- El catolicismo en la actual literatura francesa. Siluetas literarias. Madrid: Centro de Publicaciones Católicas. 1909. OCLC 431411200.
- Hacia la luz. Novela original, Premio Condesa de Sietefuentes. Madrid: Biblioteca Patria. 1910. OCLC 803821236.
- Concepto de los derechos adquiridos y de los intereses creados. ¿Hasta qué punto deben ser tenidos en cuenta por el legislador? Memoria premiada por la Real Academia de Ciencias Morales y Políticas en el Concurso ordinario de 1916. Madrid: Imprenta de Jaime Ratés. 1919. OCLC 237313766.
- En el mundo de las almas. Novela original, Premio Tartiere. Madrid: Biblioteca Patria. 1920. OCLC 433401914.
- Comentario a la nueva Ley de accidentes de Trabajo de 10 de enero de 1922. Dos tomos. Valencia: Vicente Tarancher-Renovación Tipográfica. 1922–1923. OCLC 1293151286.
- "El contrato de trabajo. Comentarios a la Ley de 21 de noviembre de 1931". Editorial Revista de Derecho Privado. Madrid. 1932. ISSN 0034-7922. OCLC 27063709.
- "El enjuiciamiento en el Derecho del Trabajo". Editorial Revista de Derecho Privado. Madrid. 1933. ISSN 0034-7922. OCLC 19430842.
- Eduardo de Hinojosa, historiador del Derecho y varón justo. Madrid: Información Jurídica. 1950. OCLC 431918045.

== See also ==
- Fundamental Laws of the Realm – Set of constitutional laws organizing the powers of the Francoist regime in Spain
- Law of Spain
- Spanish literature

== Sources ==
=== Bibliography ===
- Guallart, José; Lacarra, José M. (1955–1956). "Notas Necrológicas de Juan de Hinojosa y Ferrer y José M.ª Ramos Loscertales". Anuario de Derecho Aragonés. 8. Spanish National Research Council: 323–330. OCLC 53163511.
