= List of Carmelite saints and beatified people =

The following list includes not only Saints and those beatified by the Church (Blesseds), but also those whose beatification process has been opened, such as Venerables and Servants of God, who belonged to the Carmelite order.

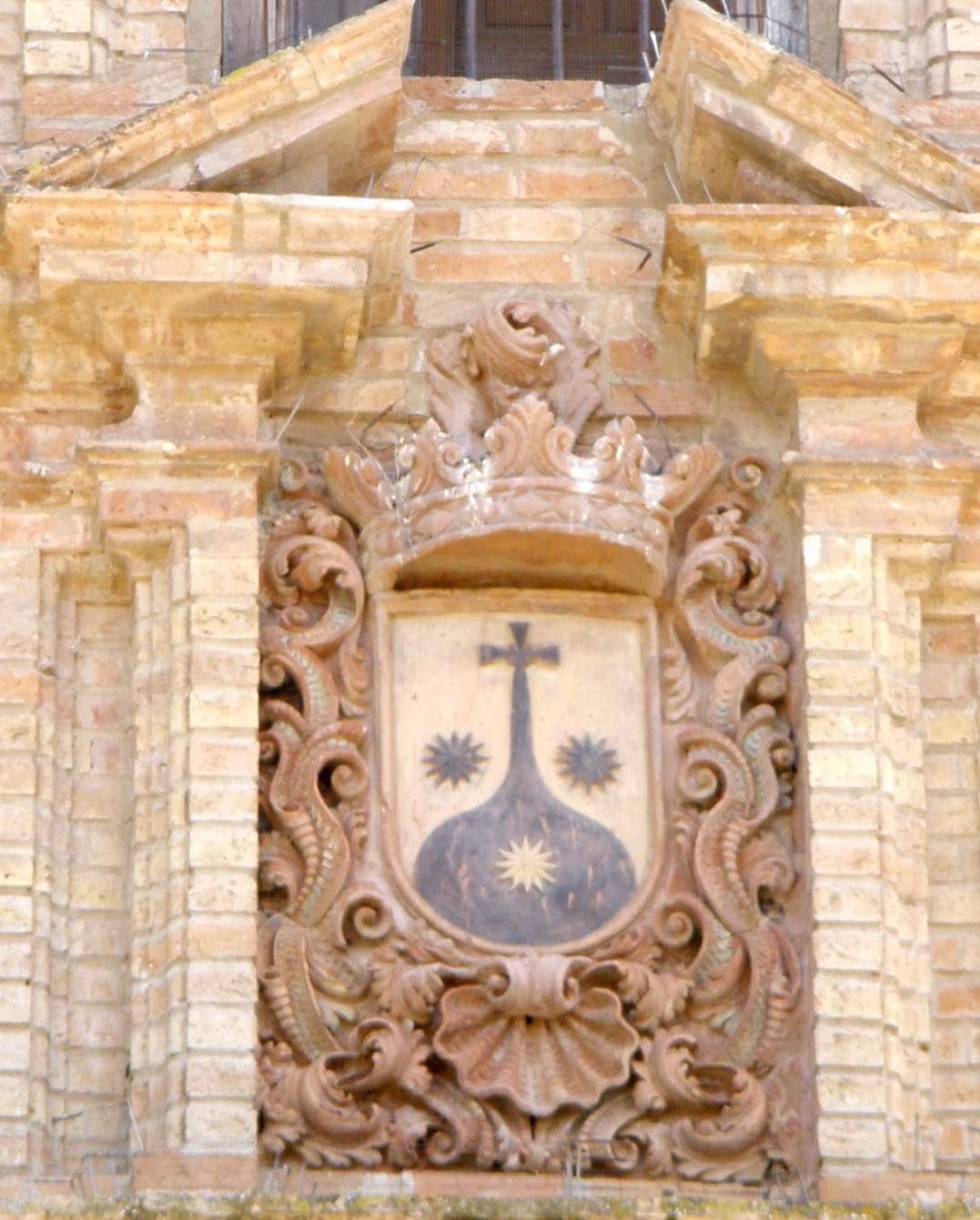
Coat of arms of the Carmelites on the facade of the Convent of San José in Antequera, Spain

== Doctors of the Church ==
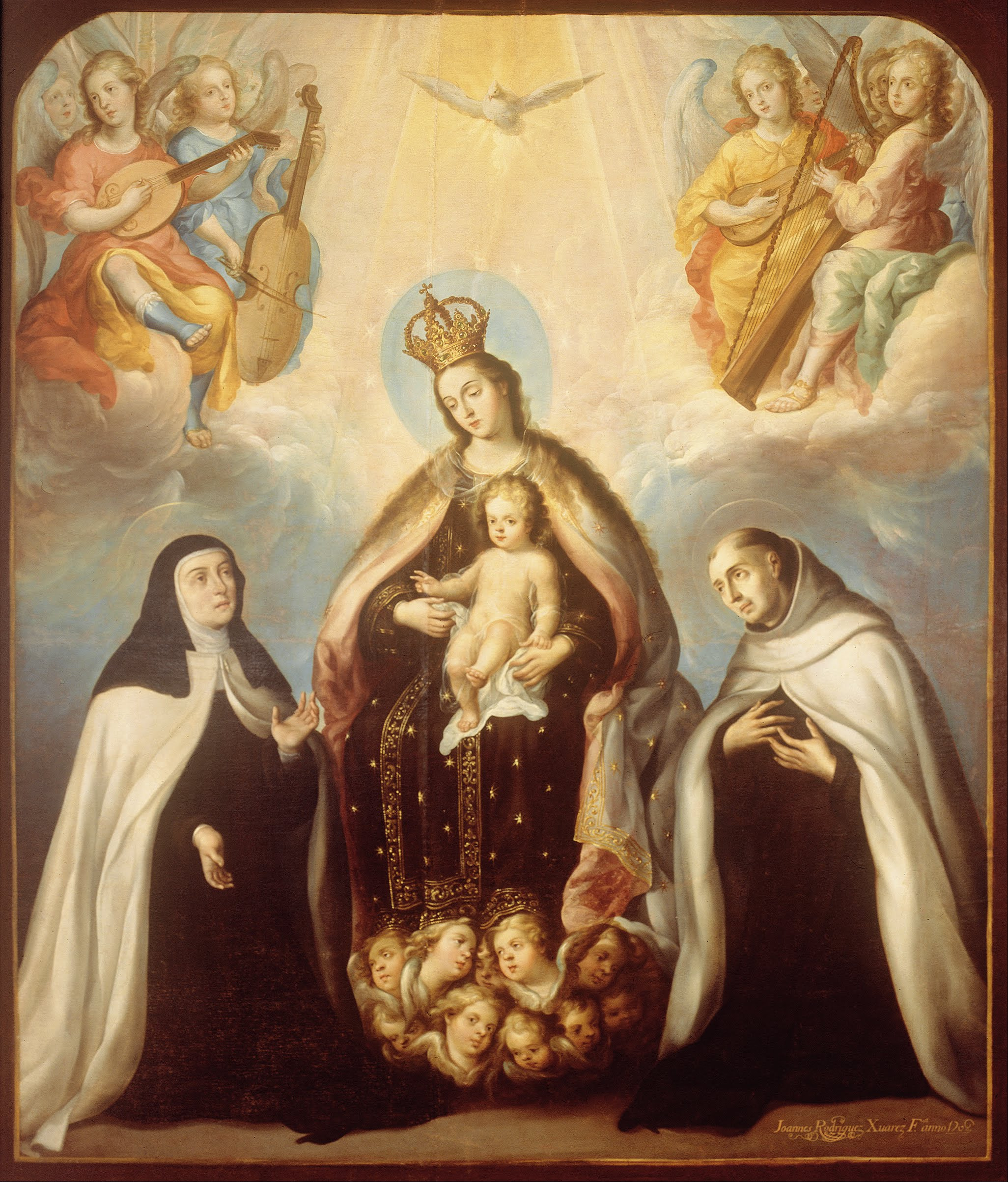
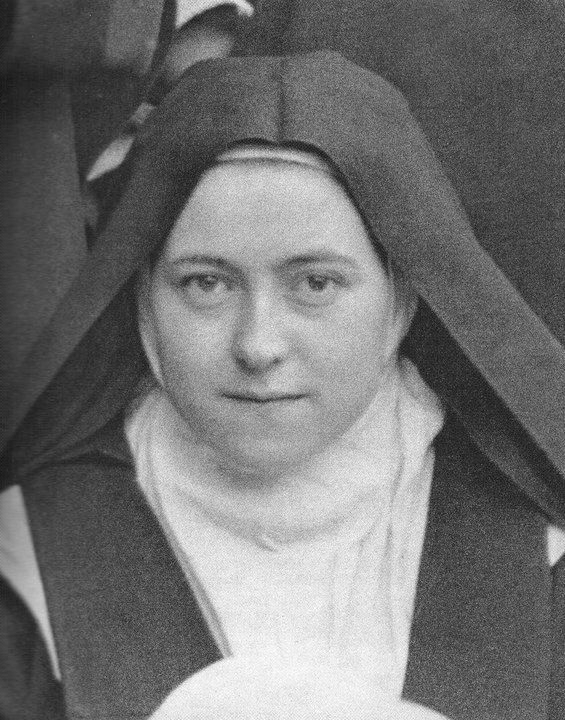
Our Lady of Mount Carmel with Ss. Teresa of Avila and John of the Cross (left) and St Therese of the Child Jesus (right)
- Juan de Yepes Álvarez (rel. name: Juan of the Cross) (1542–1591), Professed Priest and Cofounder of the Order of the Discalced Carmelite Friars; Reformer (Spain)
  - Beatified: 25 January 1675 by Pope Clement X
  - Canonized: 27 December 1726 by Pope Benedict XIII
  - Declared "Doctor of the Church": 24 August 1926 by Pope Pius XI
- Teresa Sánchez de Cepeda Ahumada (rel. name: Teresa of Jesus) (1515–1582), Professed Religious and Founder of the Orders of the Discalced Carmelite Nuns and the Discalced Carmelite Friars; Reformer (Spain)
  - Beatified: 24 April 1614 by Pope Paul V
  - Canonized: 12 March 1622 by Pope Gregory XV
  - Declared "Doctor of the Church": 27 September 1970 by Pope Paul VI
- Marie-Françoise-Thérèse Martin (rel. name: Thérèse of the Child Jesus and the Holy Face) (1873–1897), Professed Religious of the Discalced Carmelite Nuns (France)
  - Declared "Venerable": 14 August 1921
  - Beatified: 29 April 1923 by Pope Pius XI
  - Canonized: 17 May 1925 by Pope Pius XI
  - Declared "Doctor of the Church": 19 October 1997 by Pope John Paul II

== Saints ==
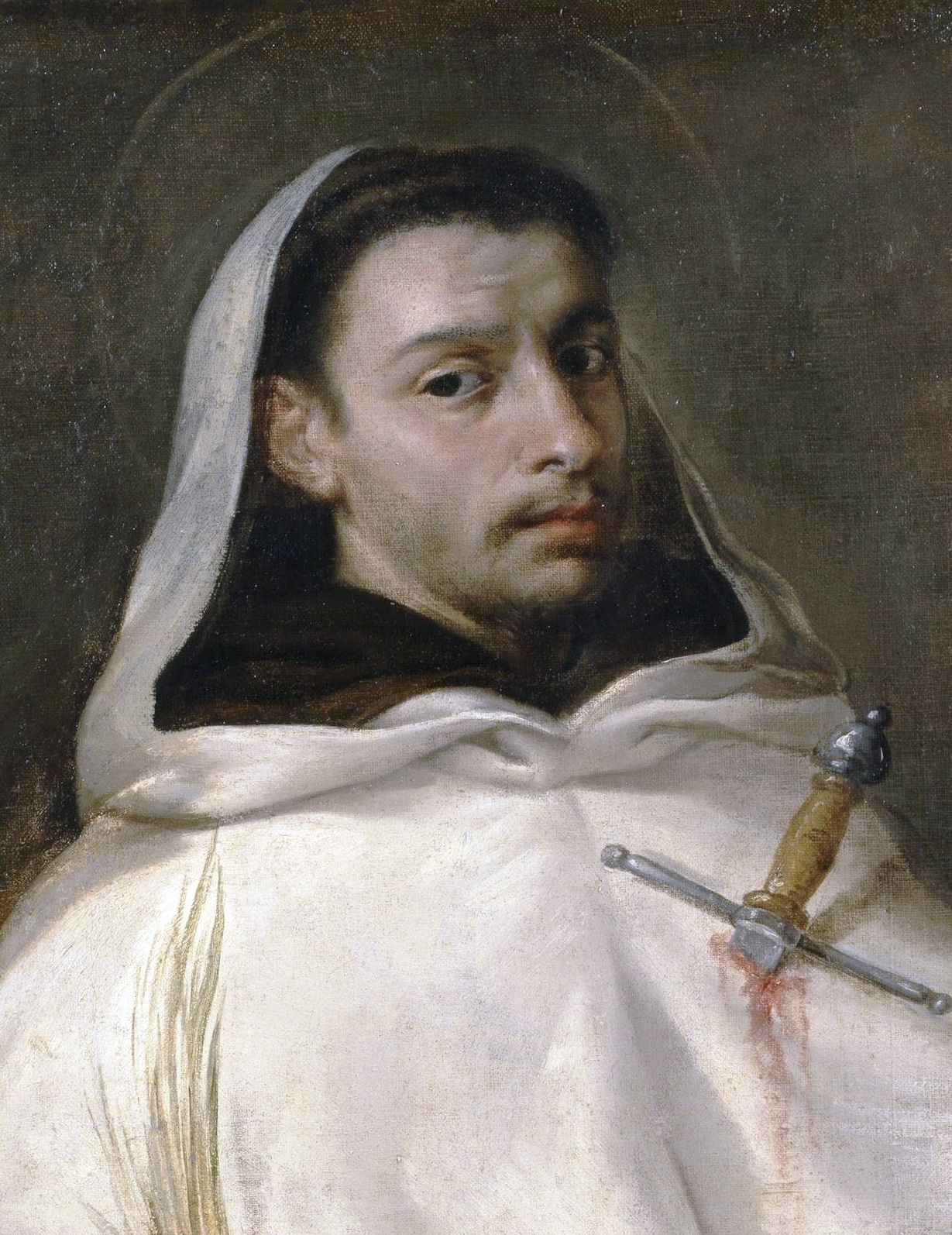
St. Angelus of Jerusalem, OCarm

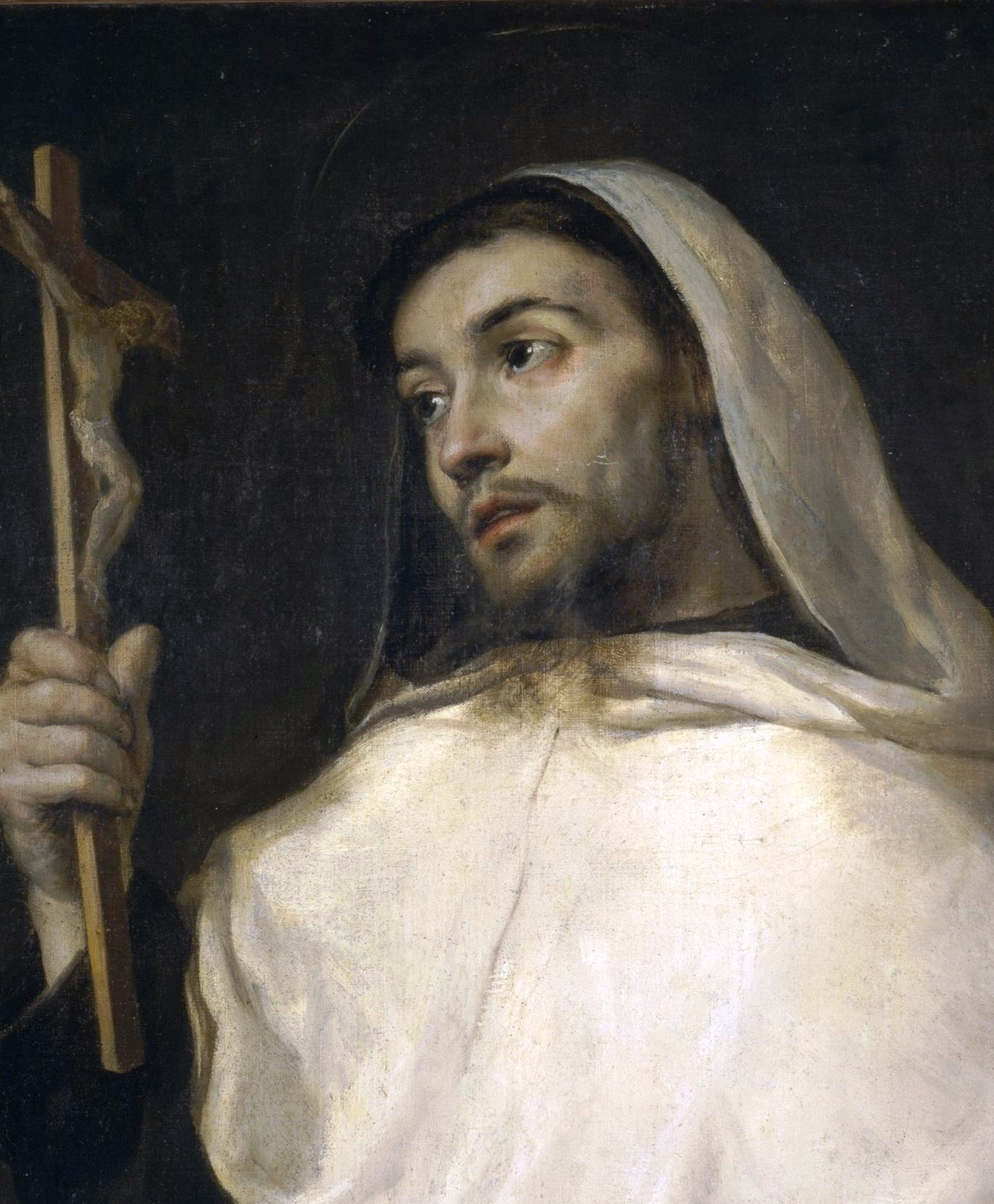
St. Albert of Trapani, OCarm

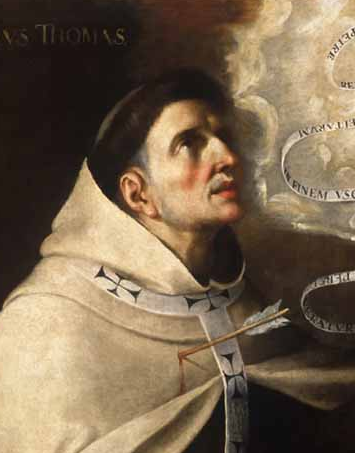
St. Pierre Thomas, OCarm

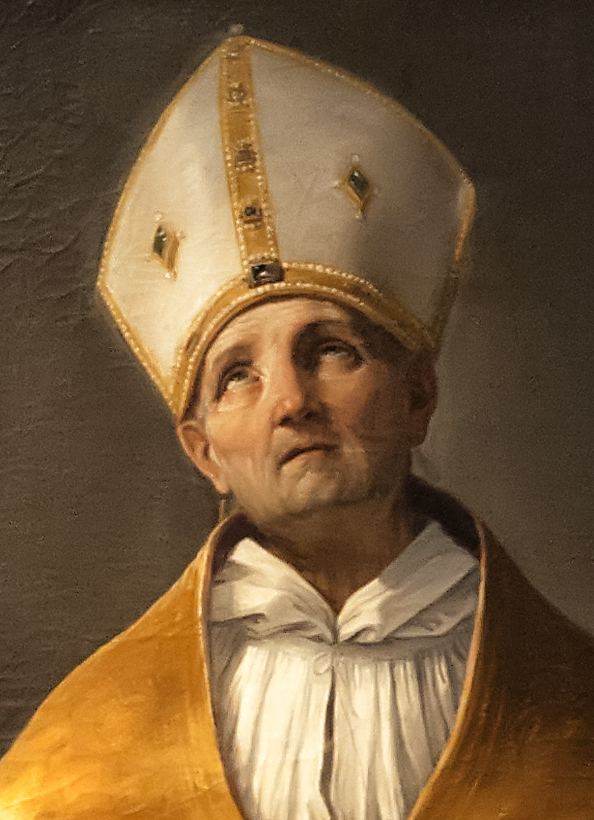
St. Andrea Corsini, OCarm

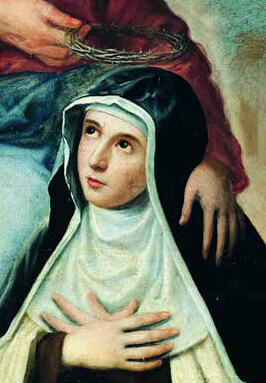
St. Maria Maddalena de' Pazzi, OCarm

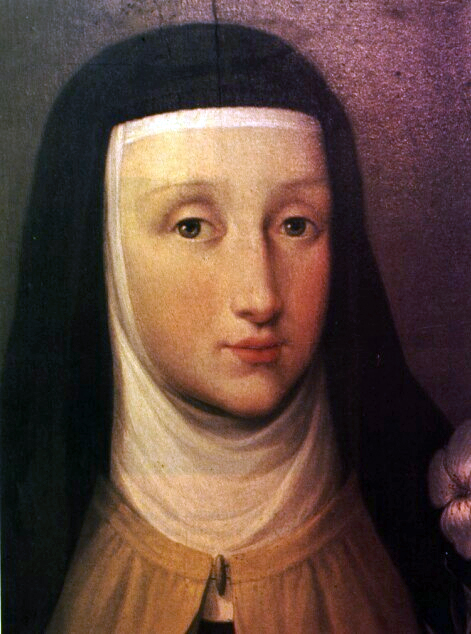
St. Teresa Margherita of the Sacred Heart, OCD

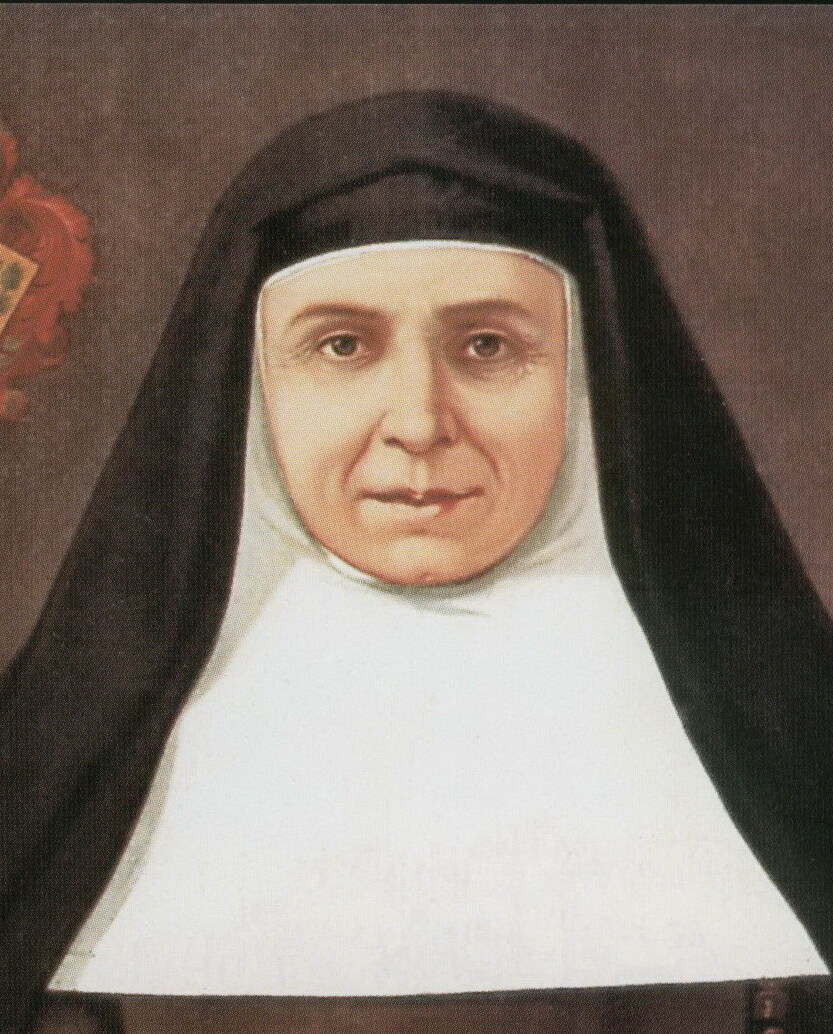
St. Joaquina de Vedruna, CCV

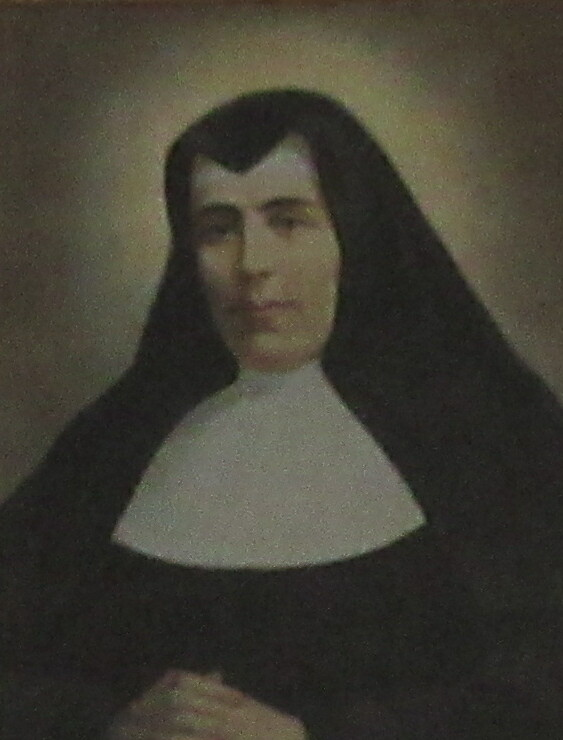
St. Teresa of Jesus, HAD

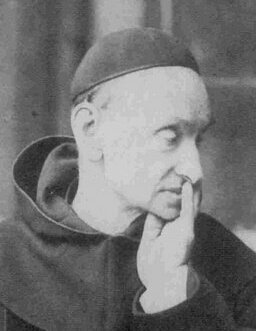
St. Rafał of Saint Joseph, OCD

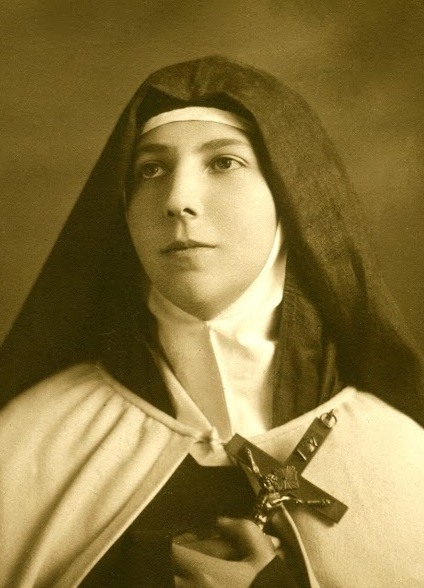
St. Teresa of Jesus de los Andes, OCD

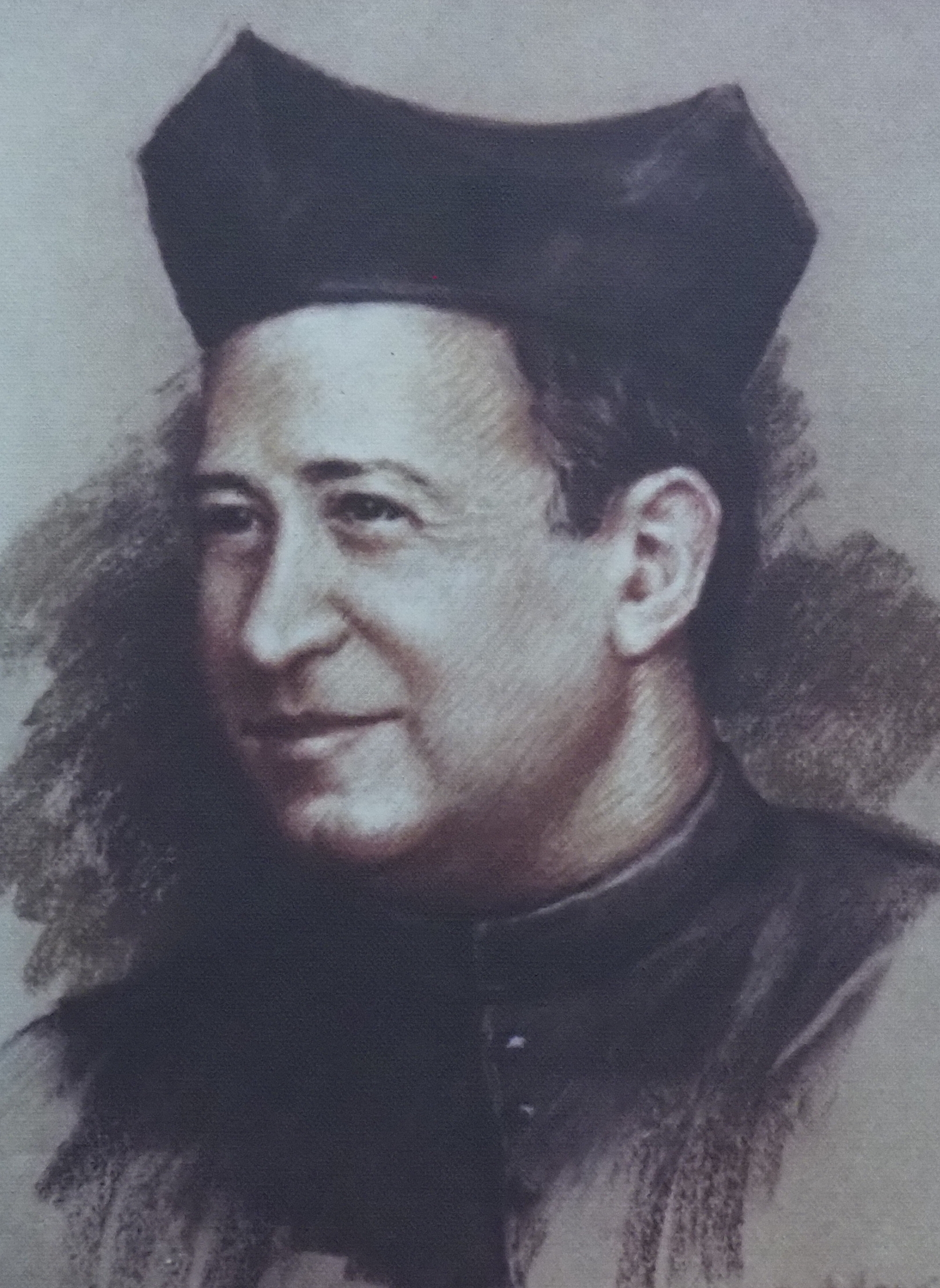
St. Enrique de Ossó Cercelló

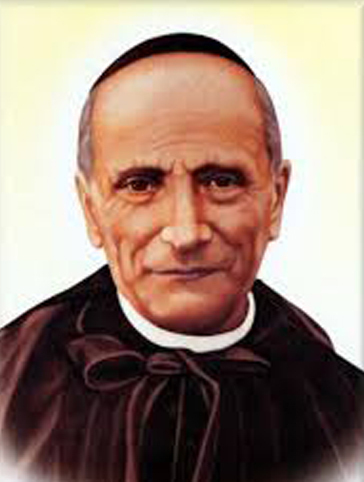
St. Annibale di Francia, OCDS

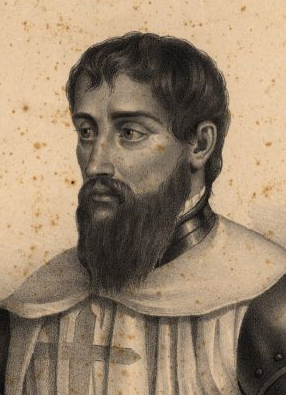
St. Nuno of Saint Mary, OCarm

Kuriakose of the Holy Family, CMI

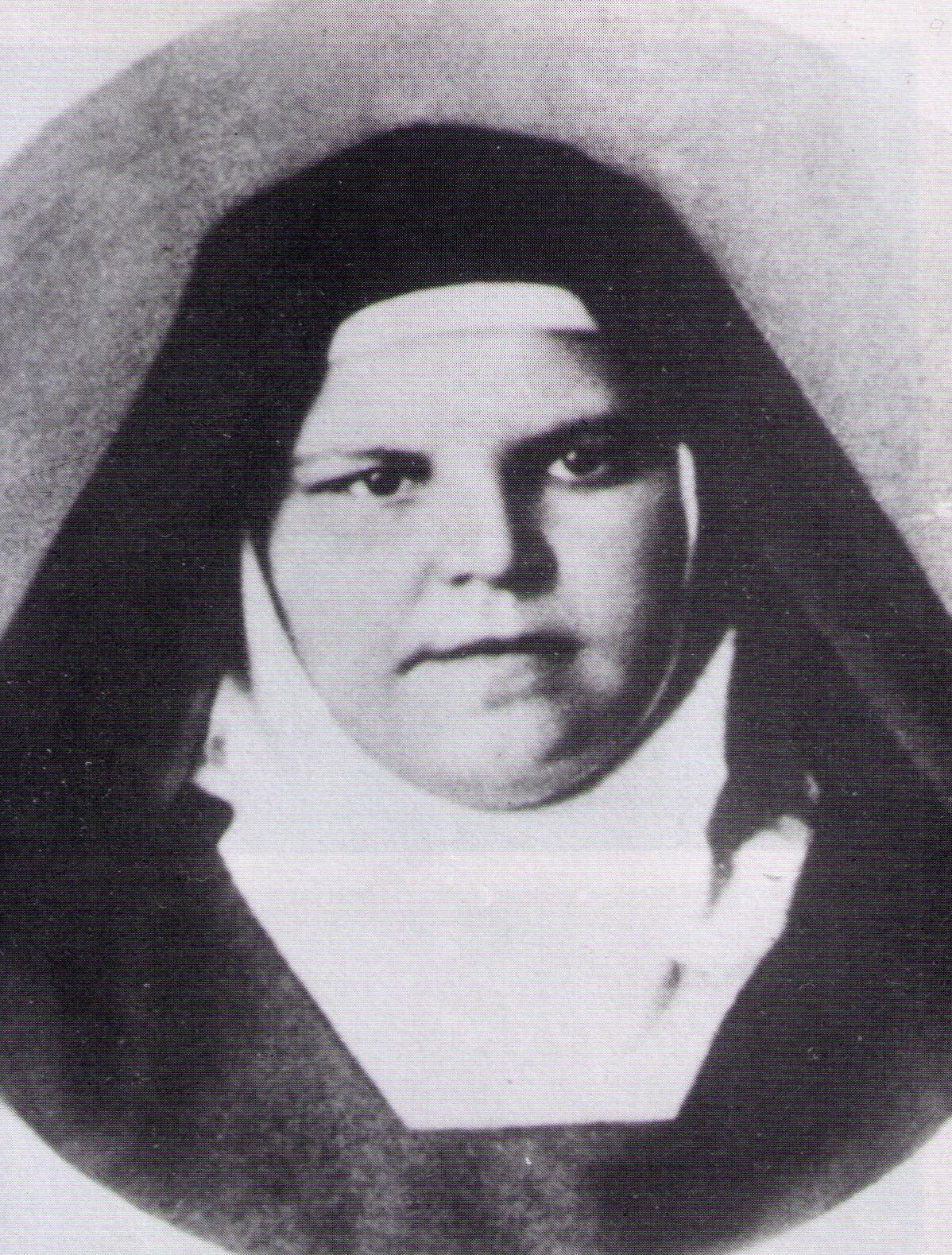
St. Mariam of Jesus Crucified, OCD

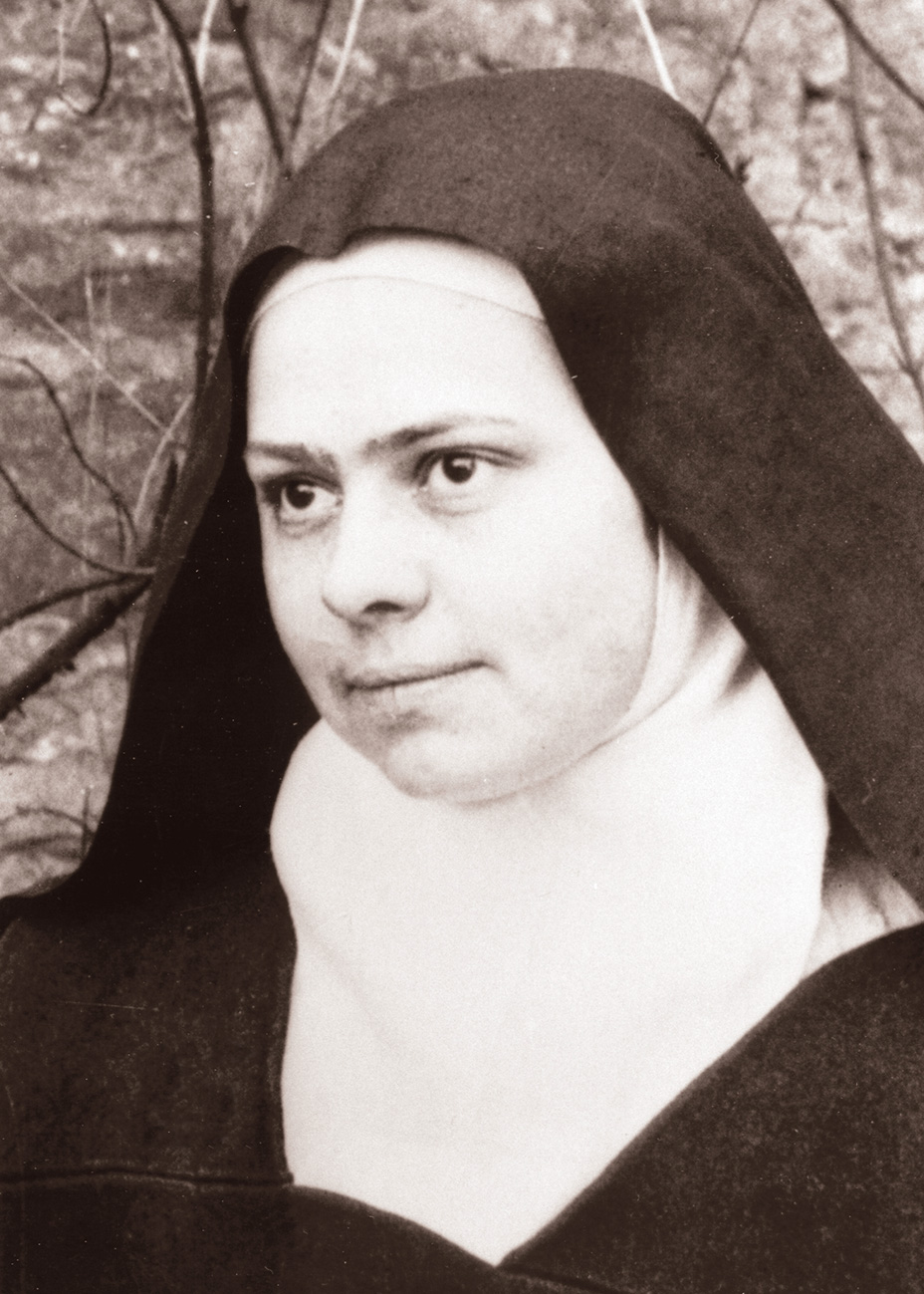
St. Elizabeth of the Trinity, OCD

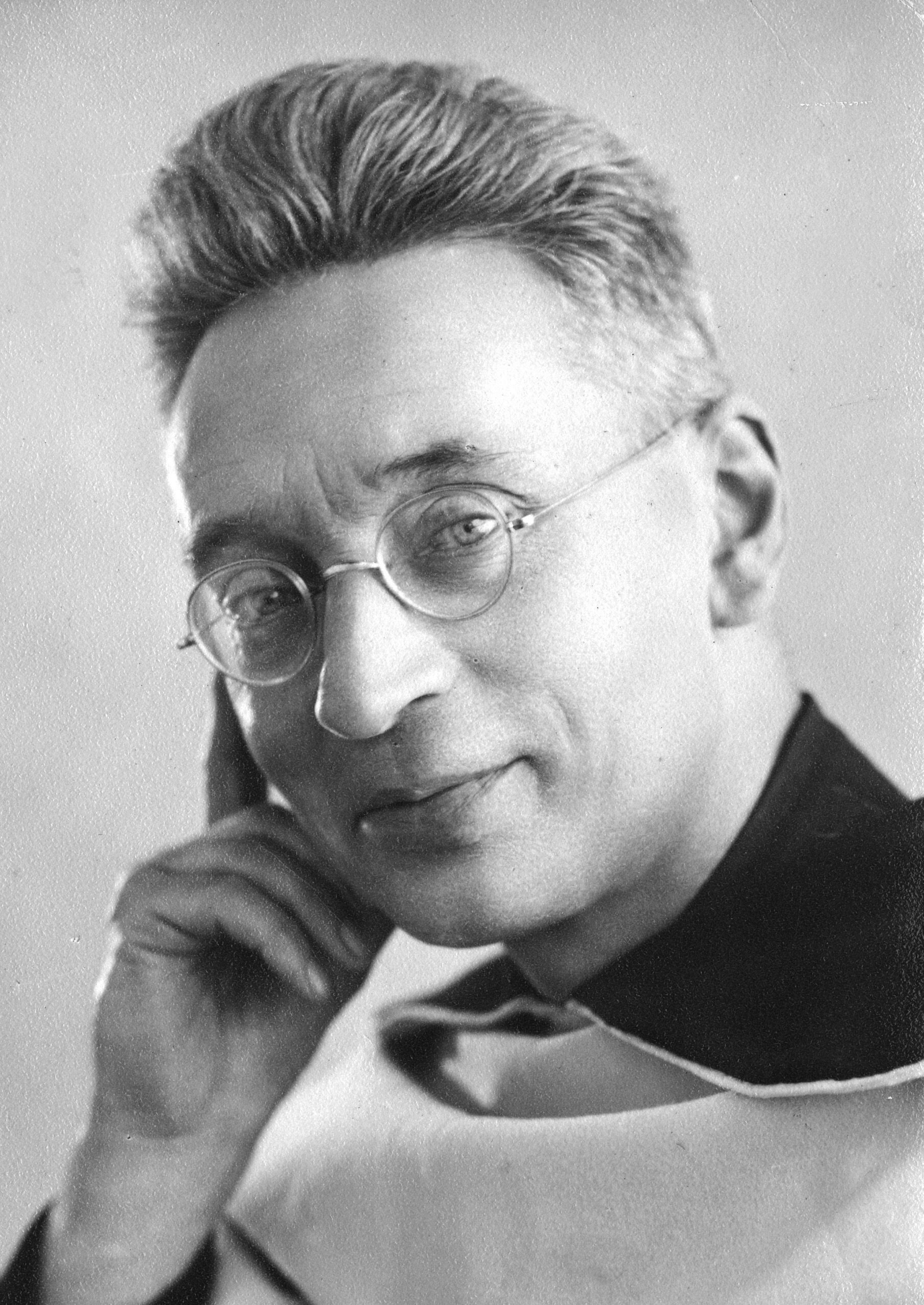
St. Titus Brandsma, OCarm
- Angelo da Sicilia (1185–1220), Professed Priest of the Carmelites of Ancient Observance (Palestine – Italy)
  - Canonized: c. 1459 by Pope Pius II
- Albert degli Abati (c. 1240–1307), Professed Priest of the Carmelites of Ancient Observance (Italy)
  - Beatified: 1454 by Pope Nicholas V
  - Canonized: 31 May 1476 by Pope Sixtus IV
- Pierre Salignac de Thomas (1305–1366), Professed Priest of the Carmelites of Ancient Observance (France – Cyprus)
  - Beatified: c. 1609 by Pope Paul V
  - Canonized: 1628 by Pope Urban VIII
- Andrea Corsini (1302–1373), Professed Priest of the Carmelites of the Ancient Observance; Bishop of Fiesole (Italy)
  - Beatified: 21 April 1440 by Pope Eugene IV
  - Canonized: 22 April 1629 by Pope Urban VIII
- Caterina Lucrezia de' Pazzi (rel. name: Maria Maddalena) (1566–1607), Professed Religious of the Carmelites of the Ancient Observance (Italy)
  - Beatified: 8 May 1626 by Pope Urban VIII
  - Canonized: 28 April 1669 by Pope Clement X
- Anna Maria Redi (rel. name: Teresa Margherita of the Sacred Heart) (1747–1770), Professed Religious of the Discalced Carmelite Nuns (Italy)
  - Declared "Venerable": 14 April 1841
  - Beatified: 9 June 1929 by Pope Pius XI
  - Canonized: 19 March 1934 by Pope Pius XI
- Joaquima Vedruna Vidal de Mas (1783–1854), Widow; Founder of the Carmelite Sisters of Charity "Vedruna" (Spain)
  - Declared "Venerable": 16 June 1935
  - Beatified: 19 May 1940 by Pope Pius XII
  - Canonized: 12 April 1959 by Pope John XXIII
- Simon Anglus (1164–1265) Priest, Order of Carmelites of the Ancient Observance
- Teresa Jornet Ibars (rel. name: Teresa of Jesus) (1843–1897), Founder of the Little Sisters of the Abandoned Elderly (Spain)
  - Declared "Venerable": 22 January 1957
  - Beatified: 27 April 1958 by Pope John XXIII
  - Canonized: 27 January 1974 by Pope Paul VI
- Józef Kalinowski (rel. name: Rafał of Saint Joseph) (1835–1907), Professed Priest of the Discalced Carmelites (Lithuania – Poland)
  - Declared "Venerable": 11 October 1980
  - Beatified: 22 June 1983 by Pope John Paul II
  - Canonized: 17 November 1991 by Pope John Paul II
- Juana Fernández Solar (rel. name: Teresa of Jesus) (1900–1920), Professed Religious of the Discalced Carmelite Nuns (Chile)
  - Declared "Venerable": 22 March 1986
  - Beatified: 3 April 1987 by Pope John Paul II
  - Canonized: 21 March 1993 by Pope John Paul II
- Enrique de Ossó i Cervelló (1840–1896), Priest of the Diocese of Tortosa; Founder of the Society of Saint Teresa of Jesus (Spain)
  - Declared "Venerable": 15 May 1976
  - Beatified: 14 October 1979 by Pope John Paul II
  - Canonized: 16 June 1993 by Pope John Paul II
- Edith Stein (rel. name: Theresia Benedikta of the Cross) (1891–1942), Professed Religious of the Discalced Carmelite Nuns; Martyr in odium fidei (Germany – Poland)
  - Declared "Venerable": 26 January 1987
  - Beatified: 1 May 1987 by Pope John Paul II
  - Canonized: 11 October 1998 by Pope John Paul II
- Pedro Poveda Castroverde (1874–1936), Priest of the Archdiocese of Madrid; Founder of the Teresian Institute; Martyr in odium fidei (Spain)
  - Declared "Venerable": 21 December 1992
  - Beatified: 10 October 1993 by Pope John Paul II
  - Canonized: 4 May 2003 by Pope John Paul II
- María de las Maravillas Pidal Chico de Guzmán (rel. name: María de las Maravillas of Jesus) (1891–1974), Professed Religious of the Discalced Carmelite Nuns (Spain)
  - Declared "Venerable": 17 December 1996
  - Beatified: 10 May 1998 by Pope John Paul II
  - Canonized: 4 May 2003 by Pope John Paul II
- Annibale Maria di Francia (1851–1927), Priest of the Archdiocese of Messina; Member of the Secular Carmelites; Founder of the Rogationists of the Heart of Jesus and the Daughters of Divine Zeal (Italy)
  - Declared "Venerable": 21 December 1989
  - Beatified: 7 October 1990 by Pope John Paul II
  - Canonized: 16 May 2004 by Pope John Paul II
- Ġorġ Preca (1880–1962), Priest of the Archdiocese of Malta; Member of the Third Order Carmelites; Founder of the Society of Christian Doctrine (Malta)
  - Declared "Venerable": 28 June 1999
  - Beatified: 9 May 2001 by Pope John Paul II
  - Canonized: 3 June 2007 by Pope Benedict XVI
- Nuno Álvares Pereira (rel. name: Nuno of Saint Mary) (1360–1431), Widower; Professed Religious of the Carmelites of the Ancient Observance (Portugal)
  - Beatified: 23 January 1918 by Pope Benedict XV
  - Declared "Venerable": 3 July 2008
  - Canonized: 26 April 2009 by Pope Benedict XVI
- Kuriakose Elias Chavara (rel. name: Kuariakose of the Holy Family) (1805–1871), Priest and Cofounder of the Carmelites of Mary Immaculate; Founder of the Congregation of the Mother of Carmel (India)
  - Declared "Venerable": 7 April 1984
  - Beatified: 8 February 1986 by Pope John Paul II
  - Canonized: 23 November 2014 by Pope Francis
- Rose Eluvathingal (rel. name: Euphrasia of the Sacred Heart of Jesus) (1877–1952), Professed Religious of the Congregation of the Mother of Carmel (India)
  - Declared "Venerable": 5 July 2002
  - Beatified: 3 December 2006 by Cardinal Varkey Vithayathil, C.Ss.R.
  - Canonized: 23 November 2014 by Pope Francis
- Maryam Bawārdī (rel. name: Marie of Jesus Crucified) (1846–1878), Professed Religious of the Discalced Carmelite Nuns (Palestine)
  - Declared "Venerable": 27 November 1981
  - Beatified: 13 November 1983 by Pope John Paul II
  - Canonized: 17 May 2015 by Pope Francis
- Louis Martin (1823–1894) and Marie-Azélie Guérin Martin (1831–1877), Married Couple of the Dioceses of Bayeux-Liseux and Séez (France)
  - Declared "Venerable": 26 March 1994
  - Beatified: 19 October 2008 by Cardinal José Saraiva Martins, C.M.F.
  - Canonized: 18 October 2015 by Pope Francis
- Élisabeth Catez (rel. name: Élisabeth of the Trinity) (1880–1906), Professed Religious of the Discalced Carmelite Nuns (France)
  - Declared "Venerable": 12 July 1982
  - Beatified: 25 November 1984 by Pope John Paul II
  - Canonized: 16 October 2016 by Pope Francis
- Anno Sjoerd Brandsma (rel. name: Titus) (1881–1942), Professed Priest of the Carmelites of the Ancient Observance; Martyr in odium fidei (Netherlands – Germany)
  - Declared "Venerable": 9 November 1984
  - Beatified: 3 November 1985 by Pope John Paul II
  - Canonized: 15 May 2022 by Pope Francis

== Blesseds ==
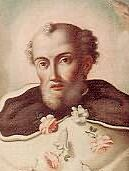
Bl. Angelo Mazzinghi, OCarm

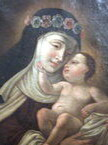
Bl. Giovanna Scopelli, OCarm

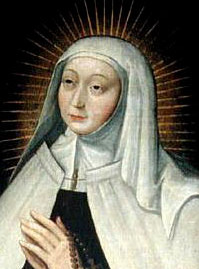
Bl. Marie of the Incarnation, OCD

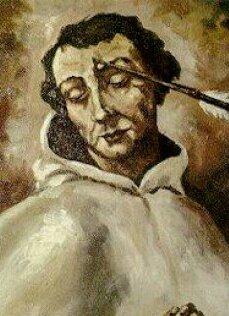
Bl. Luigi Rabatà, OCarm

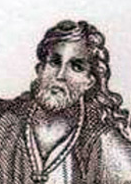
Bl. Ludovico Morbioli

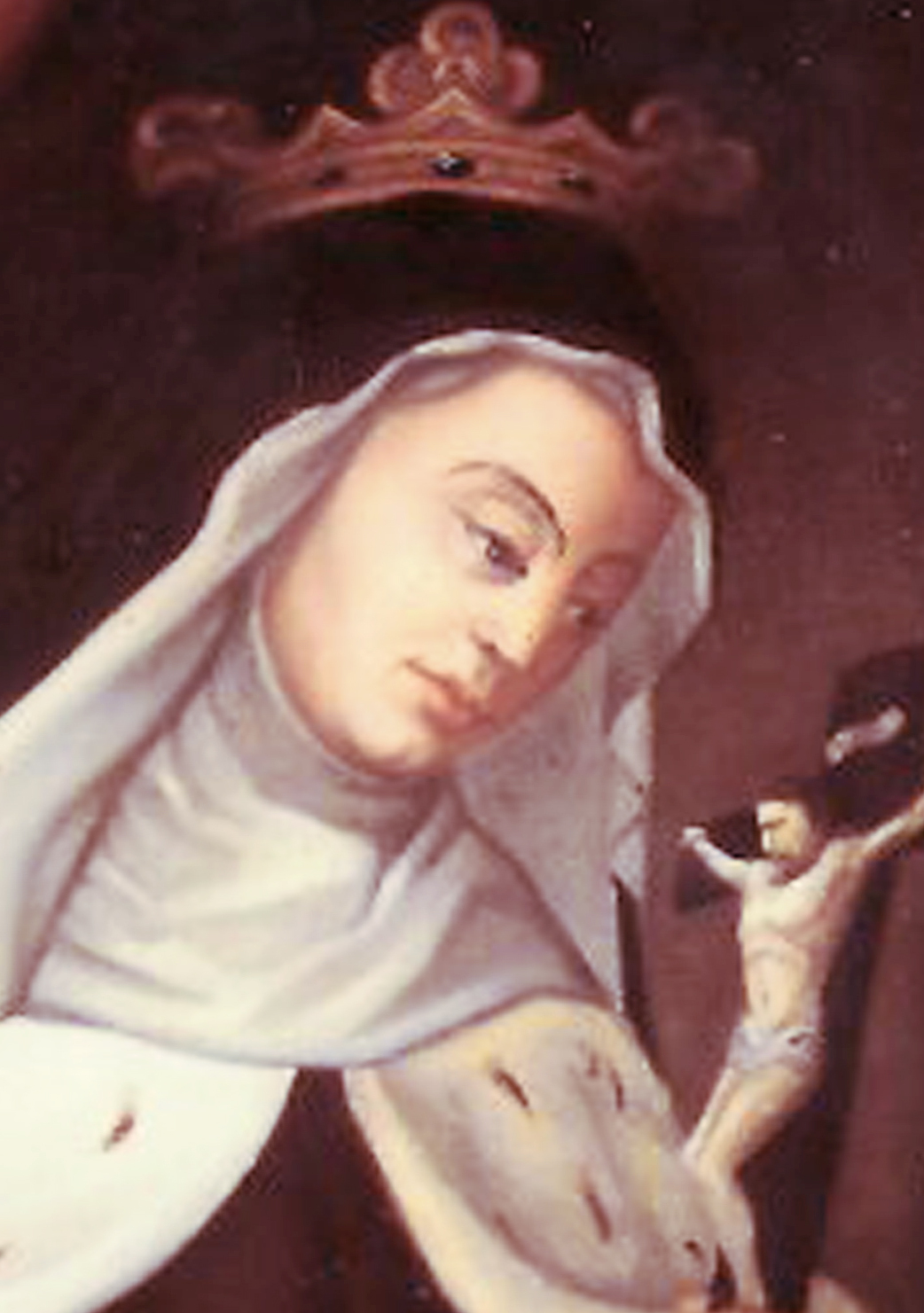
Bl. Françoise d'Amboise, OCarm

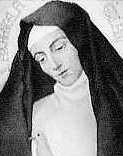
Bl. Arcangela Girlani, OCarm

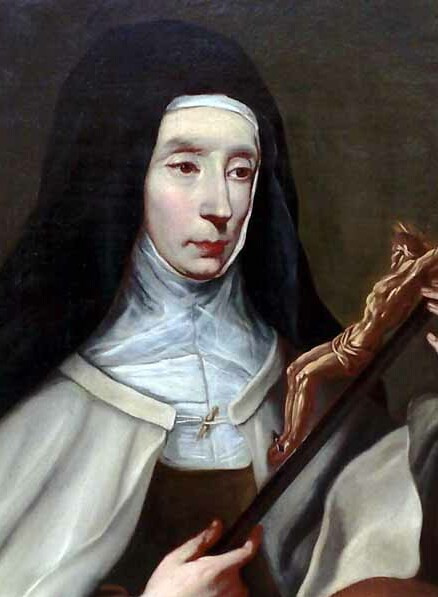
Bl. Maria of the Angels, OCD

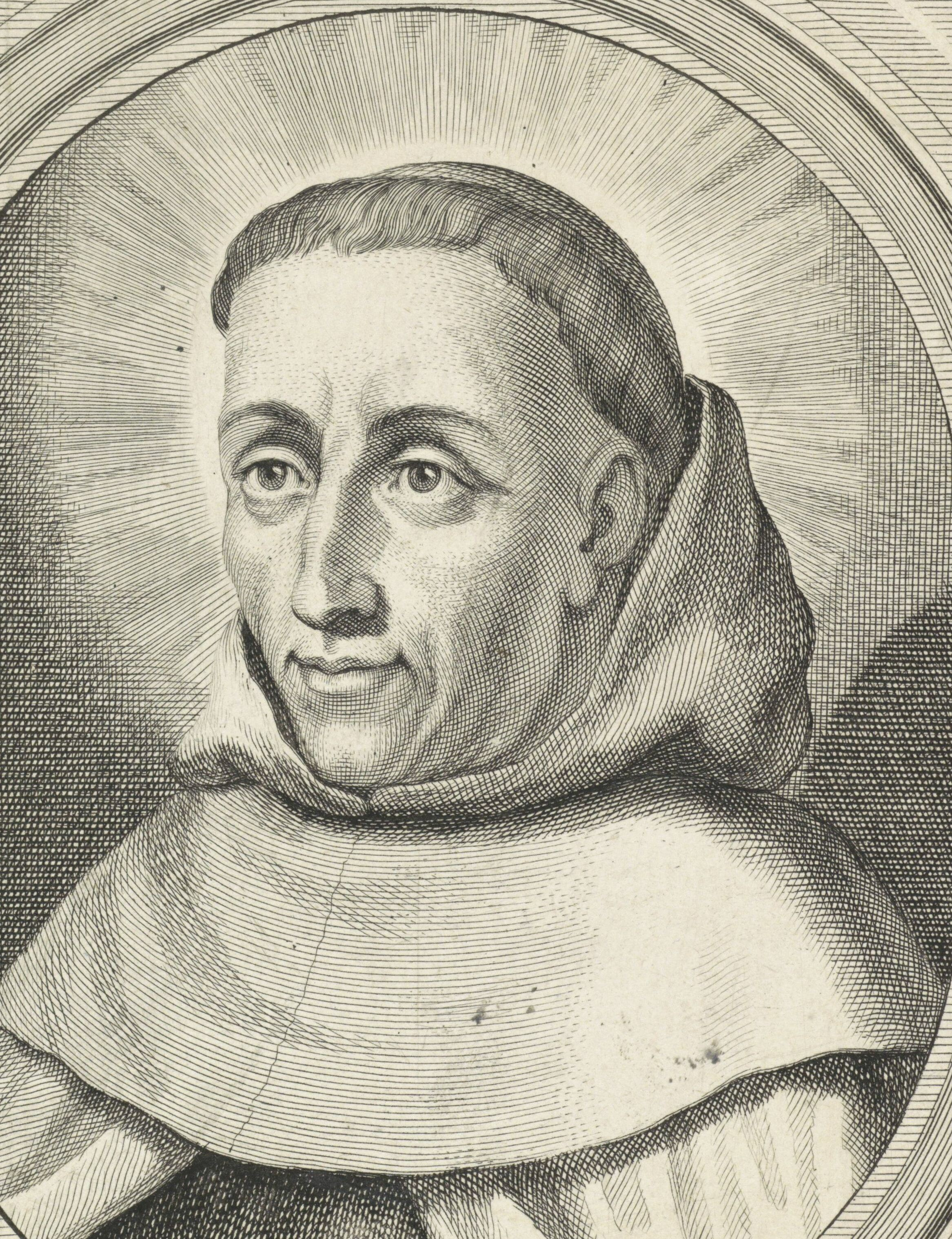
Bl. Jean Soreth, OCarm

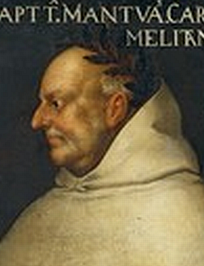
Bl. Battista Spagnoli, OCarm

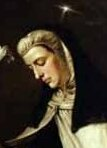
Bl. Jeanne of Toulouse, TOCarm

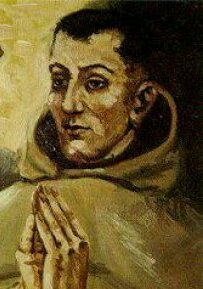
Bl. Bartolomeo Fanti, OCarm

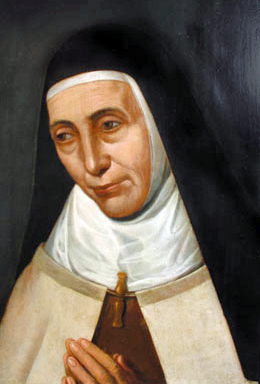
Bl. Ana of Saint Bartholomew, OCD

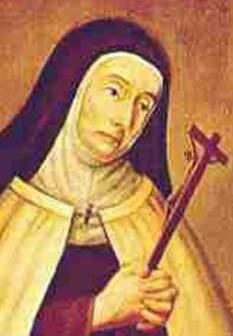
Bl. María of Jesus, OCD

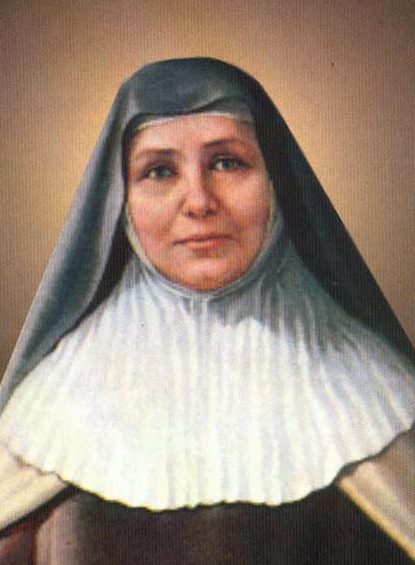
Bl. Teresa Maria of the Cross, SCST

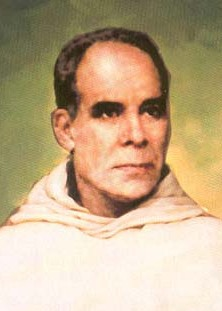
Bl. Francesc of Jesus, Mary, Joseph, OCD

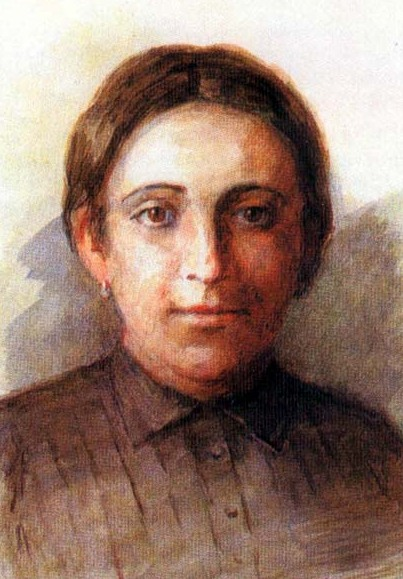
Bl. Josefa Naval Girbés, OCDS

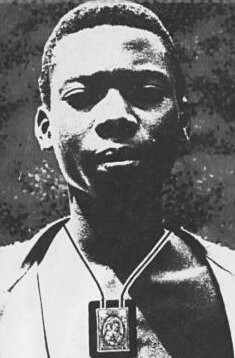
Bl. Isidore Bakanja

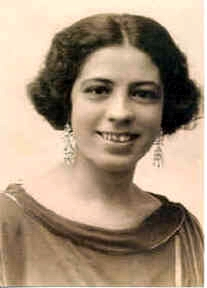
Bl. Victoria Díez Bustos de Molina

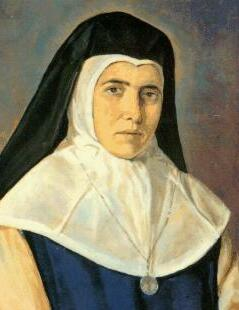
Bl. Juana María Condesa Lluch, EMI

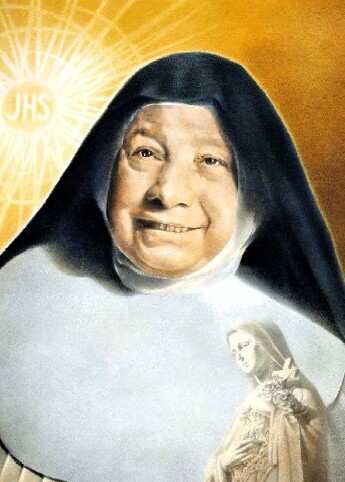
Bl. Maria Crocifissa Curcio, SCMST

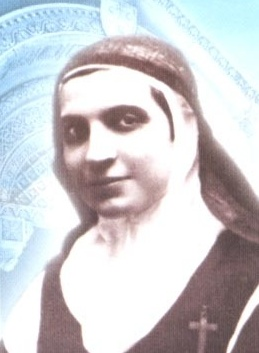
Bl. Elia of Saint Clement, OCD

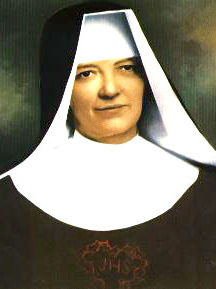
Bl. Maria Teresa of Saint Joseph, DCJ

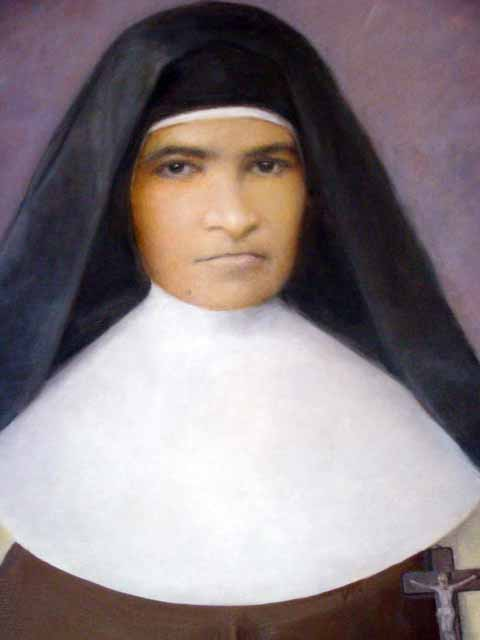
Bl. Candelaria of Saint Joseph, HCMC

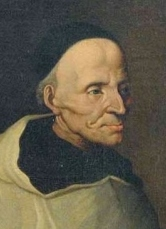
Bl. Angelo Paoli, OCarm

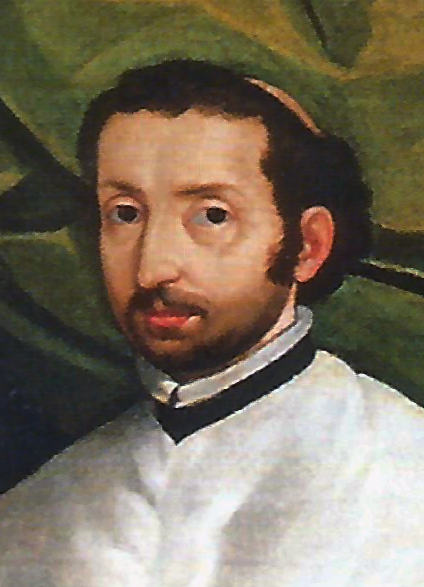
Bl. Juan de Palafox Mendoza

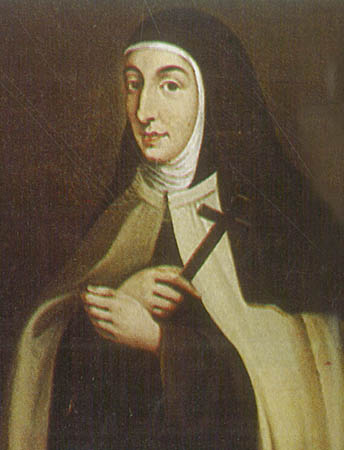
Bl. Anne of Jesus, OCD

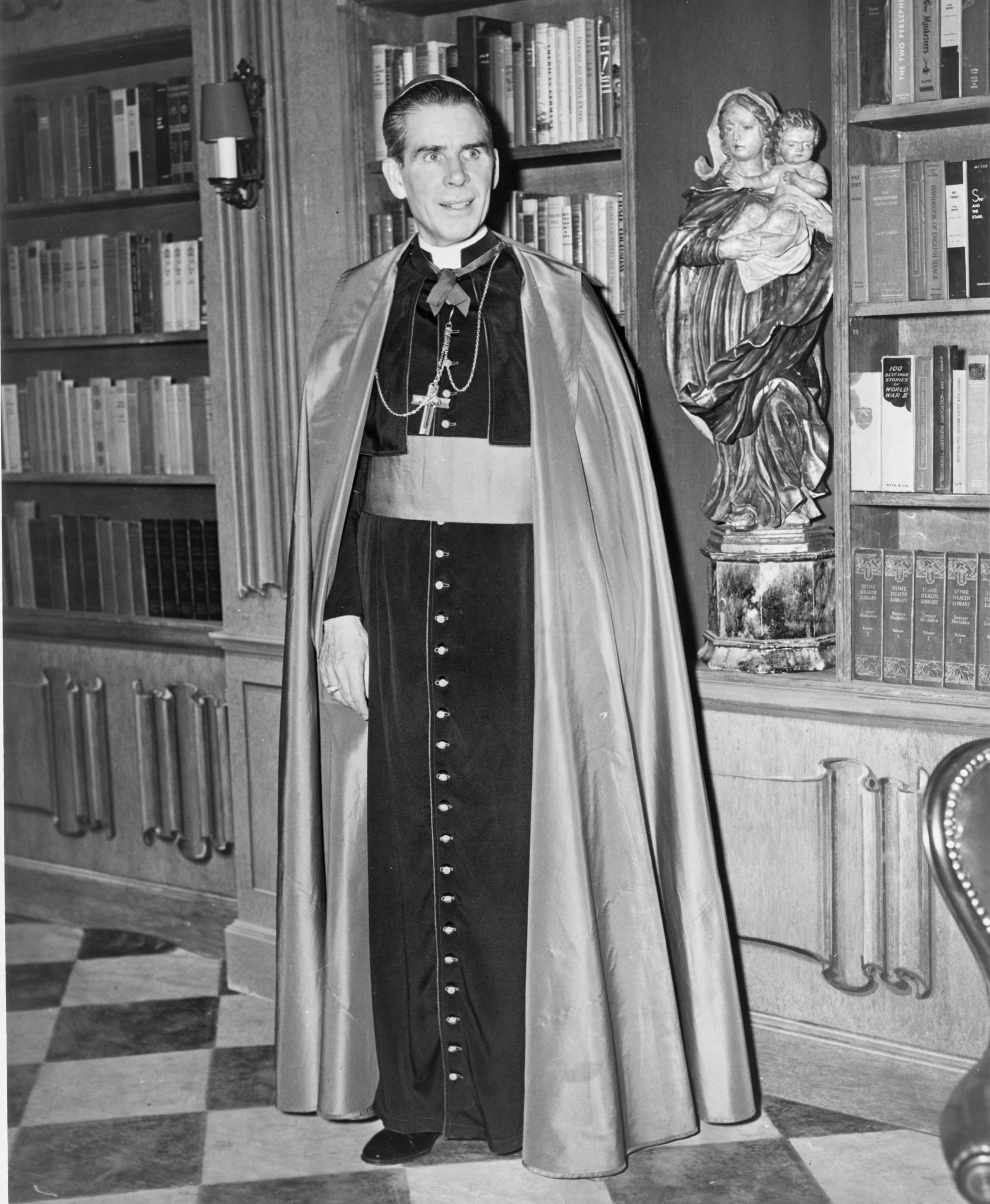
Bl. Fulton J. Sheen, T.O.Carm
- Angelo Agostini Mazzinghi (1385–1438), Professed Priest of the Carmelites of the Ancient Observance (Italy)
  - Beatified: 7 March 1761 by Pope Clement XIII
- Giovanna Scopelli (1428–1491), Professed Religious of the Carmelite Nuns of the Ancient Observance (Italy)
  - Beatified: 24 August 1771 by Pope Clement XIV
- Barbe Acarie née Avrillot (rel. name: Marie of the Incarnation) (1566–1618), Widow; Professed Religious of the Discalced Carmelites Nuns (France)
  - Declared "Venerable": 1 October 1566
  - Beatified: 5 June 1791 by Pope Pius VI
- Luigi Rabatà (1443–1490), Professed Priest of the Carmelites of the Ancient Observance; Martyr in odium fidei (Italy)
  - Beatified: 10 December 1841 by Pope Gregory XVI
- Ludovico Morbioli (1433–1485), Layperson of the Archdiocese of Bologna (Italy)
  - Beatified: 24 October 1842 by Pope Gregory XVI
- Françoise d'Amboise (1427–1485), Widow; Professed Religious of the Carmelite Nuns of the Ancient Observance (France)
  - Beatified: 16 July 1863 by Pope Pius IX
- Eleanora Girlani (rel. name: Arcangela) (1460–1494), Professed Religious of the Carmelite Nuns of the Ancient Observance (Italy)
  - Beatified: 1 October 1864 by Pope Pius IX
- Marianna Fontanella (rel. name: Maria of the Angels) (1661–1717), Professed Religious of the Discalced Carmelite Nuns (Italy)
  - Beatified: 14 May 1865 by Pope Pius IX
- Jean Soreth (1394–1471), Professed Priest of the Carmelites of the Ancient Observance (France)
  - Beatified: 3 May 1866 by Pope Pius IX
- Battista Spagnoli (1447–1516), Professed Priest of the Carmelites of the Ancient Observance (Italy)
  - Beatified: 17 December 1885 by Pope Leo XIII
- Jeanne de Toulouse (d. c. 1440), Layperson of the Archdiocese of Toulouse; Member of the Lay Carmelites (France)
  - Beatified: 11 February 1895 by Pope Leo XIII
- Bartolomeo Fanti (c. 1428–1495), Professed Priest of the Carmelites of the Ancient Observance (Italy)
  - Beatified: 18 March 1909 by Pope Pius X
- Ana García Manzanas (rel. name: Ana of Saint Bartholomew) (1549–1626), Professed Religious of the Discalced Carmelite Nuns (Spain – Belgium)
  - Declared "Venerable": 29 June 1735
  - Beatified: 6 May 1917 by Pope Benedict XV
- María López de Rivas Martínez (rel. name: María of Jesus) (1560–1640), Professed Religious of the Discalced Carmelite Nuns (Spain)
  - Declared "Venerable": 22 June 1872
  - Beatified: 14 November 1976 by Pope Paul VI
- Teresa Maneti (rel. name: Teresa Maria of the Cross) (1846–1910), Founder of the Carmelite Sisters of Saint Teresa (Italy)
  - Declared "Venerable": 23 May 1975
  - Beatified: 19 October 1986 by Pope John Paul II
- Francesc Palau Quer (rel. name: Francesc of Jesus, Mary, Joseph) (1811–1872), Professed Priest of the Discalced Carmelites; Founder of the Carmelite Missionaries and the Teresian Carmelite Missionaries (Spain)
  - Declared "Venerable": 10 November 1986
  - Beatified: 24 April 1988 by Pope John Paul II
- Jacques Retouret, Professed Priest Order of Carmelites of the Ancient Observance; Martyred in Rochefort Harbour, France
  - Beatified: 1 October 1995 by Pope John Paul II
- Josefa Naval Girbés (1820–1893), Layperson of the Archdiocese of Valencia; Member of the Secular Carmelites (Spain)
  - Declared "Venerable": 3 January 1987
  - Beatified: 25 September 1988 by Pope John Paul II
- Isidore Bakanja (c. 1887–1909), Young Layperson of the Archdiocese of Mbandaka-Bikoro; Martyr in odium fidei (Democratic Republic of Congo)
  - Declared "Venerable": 2 April 1993
  - Beatified: 24 April 1994 by Pope John Paul II
- Victoria Díez Bustos de Molina (1903–1936), Layperson of the Diocese of Córdoba; Member of the Teresian Institute; Martyr in odium fidei (Spain)
  - Declared "Venerable": 6 July 1993
  - Beatified: 10 October 1993 by Pope John Paul II
- Juana María Condesa Lluch (1862–1916), Founder of the Handmaids of Mary Immaculate (Spain)
  - Declared "Venerable": 7 July 1997
  - Beatified: 23 March 2003 by Pope John Paul II
- Maria Barba (rel. name: Maria Candida of the Eucharist) (1884–1949), Professed Religious of the Discalced Carmelite Nuns (Italy)
  - Declared "Venerable": 18 December 2000
  - Beatified: 21 March 2004 by Pope John Paul II
- Rosa Curcio (rel. name: Maria Crocifissa) (1877–1957), Founder of the Carmelite Missionary Sisters of Saint Therese of the Child Jesus (Italy)
  - Declared "Venerable": 20 December 2002
  - Beatified: 13 November 2005 by Cardinal José Saraiva Martins, C.M.F.
- Teodora Fracasso (Elia of Saint Clement) (1901–1927), Professed Religious of the Discalced Carmelite Nuns (Italy)
  - Declared "Venerable": December 11, 1987
  - Beatified: 18 March 2006 by José Saraiva Martins, C.M.F.
- Anna Maria Tauschner van den Bosch (rel. name: Marie-Teresa of Saint Joseph) (1855–1938), Founder of the Carmelite Sisters of the Divine Heart of Jesus (Poland – Netherlands)
  - Declared "Venerable": 20 December 2002
  - Beatified: 13 May 2006 by Cardinal Adrianus Johannes Simonis
- Susana Paz-Castillo Ramírez (rel. name: Candelaria of Saint Joseph) (1863–1940), Founder of the Carmelite Sisters of Venezuela (Carmelites of Mother Candelaria) (Venezuela)
  - Declared "Venerable": 14 April 2004
  - Beatified: 27 April 2008 by Cardinal José Saraiva Martins, C.M.F.
- Giuseppina Catanea (rel. name: Maria Giuseppina of Jesus Crucified) (1894–1948), Professed Religious of the Discalced Carmelite Nuns (Italy)
  - Declared "Venerable": 3 January 1987
  - Beatified: 1 June 2008 by Cardinal Crescenzio Sepe
- Francesco Paoli (rel. name: Angelo) (1642–1720), Professed Priest of the Carmelites of the Ancient Observance (Italy)
  - Declared "Venerable": 21 January 1781
  - Beatified: 25 April 2010 by Cardinal Angelo Amato, S.D.B.
- Georg Häfner (1900–1942), Priest of the Diocese of Würzburg; Martyr in odium fidei (Germany)
  - Declared "Venerable": 3 July 2009
  - Beatified: 15 May 2011 by Cardinal Angelo Amato, S.D.B.
- Juan de Palafox Mendoza (1600–1659), Bishop of Puebla de los Ángeles and Osma (Spain)
  - Declared "Venerable": 17 January 2009
  - Beatified: 5 June 2011 by Cardinal Angelo Amato, S.D.B.
- Henri Grialou (Marie-Eugène of the Child Jesus) (1894–1967), Professed Priest of the Discalced Carmelites; Founder of the Secular Institute "Notre-Dame de Vie" (France)
  - Declared "Venerable": 19 December 2011
  - Beatified: 19 November 2016 by Cardinal Angelo Amato, S.D.B.
- María Felicia Guggiari Echeverría (rel. name: María Felicia of Jesus in the Blessed Sacrament) (1925–1959), Professed Religious of the Discalced Carmelite Nuns (Paraguay)
  - Declared "Venerable": 27 March 2010
  - Beatified: 23 June 2018 by Cardinal Angelo Amato, S.D.B.
- Ana de Lobera y Torres (rel. name: Anne of Jesus) (1545–1621), Professed Religious of the Discalced Carmelite Nuns (Spain – Belgium)
  - Declared "Venerable": 28 November 2019
  - Beatified: 29 September 2024 by Pope Francis
- Fulton John Sheen (1895–1979), Bishop of Rochester; Titular Archbishop of Newport; Member of the Secular Carmelites (United States)
  - Declared "Venerable": 28 June 2012
  - Beatified: 24 September 2026 by Cardinal Luis Antonio Tagle

== Venerables ==
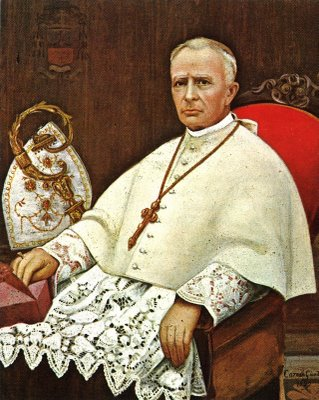
Antonio of Jesus, OCD

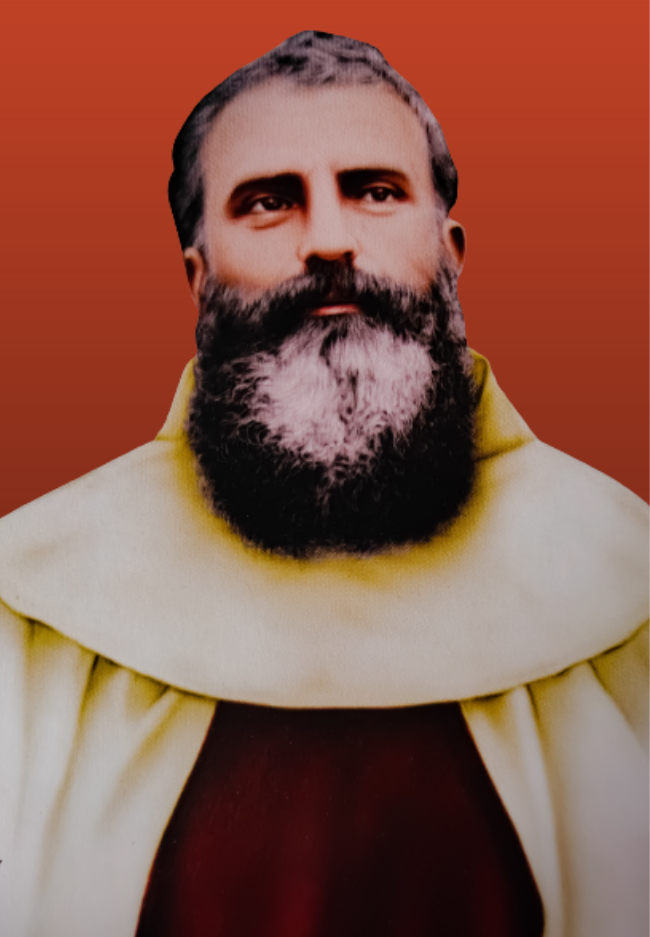
John Vicente, OCD

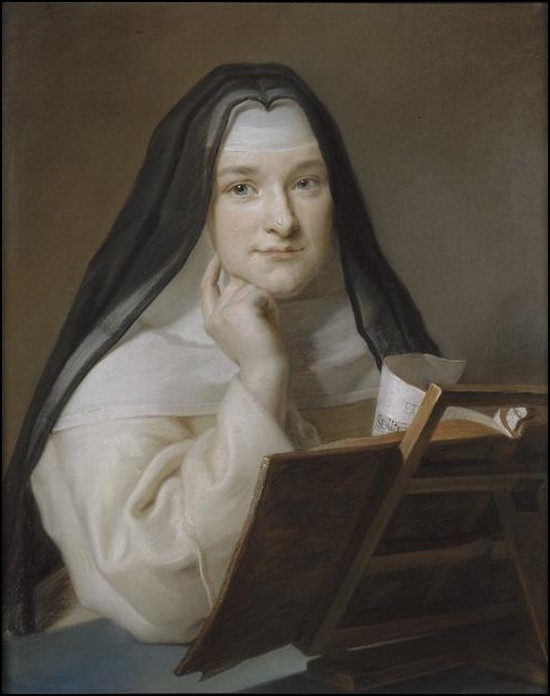
Thérèse of Saint Augustine, OCD

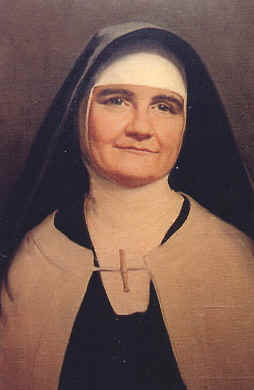
Mary Angeline McCrory

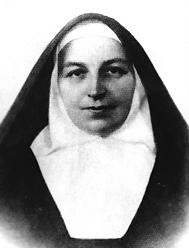
Maria Teresa, CSCII

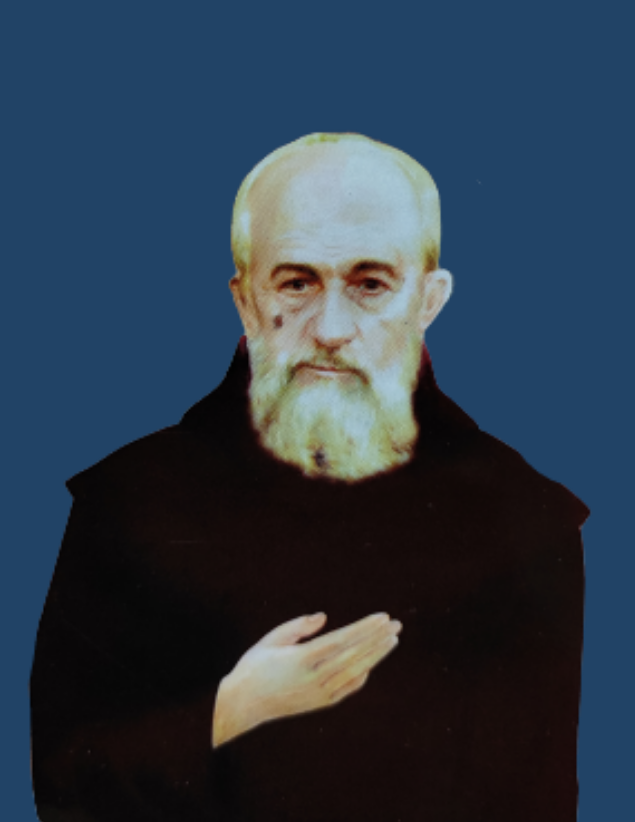
Zacarias of Saint Teresa, OCD

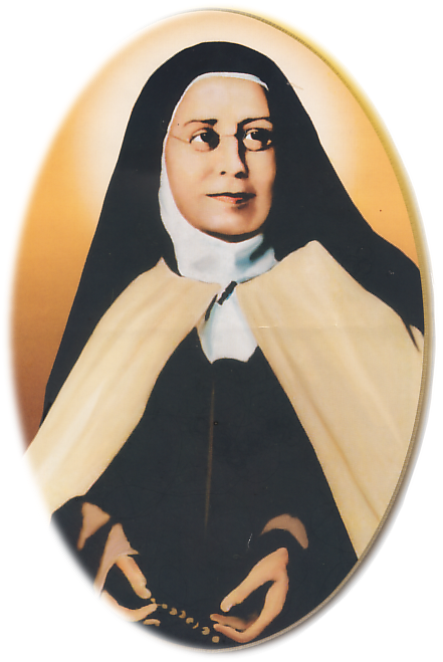
Veronica of the Passion, OCD

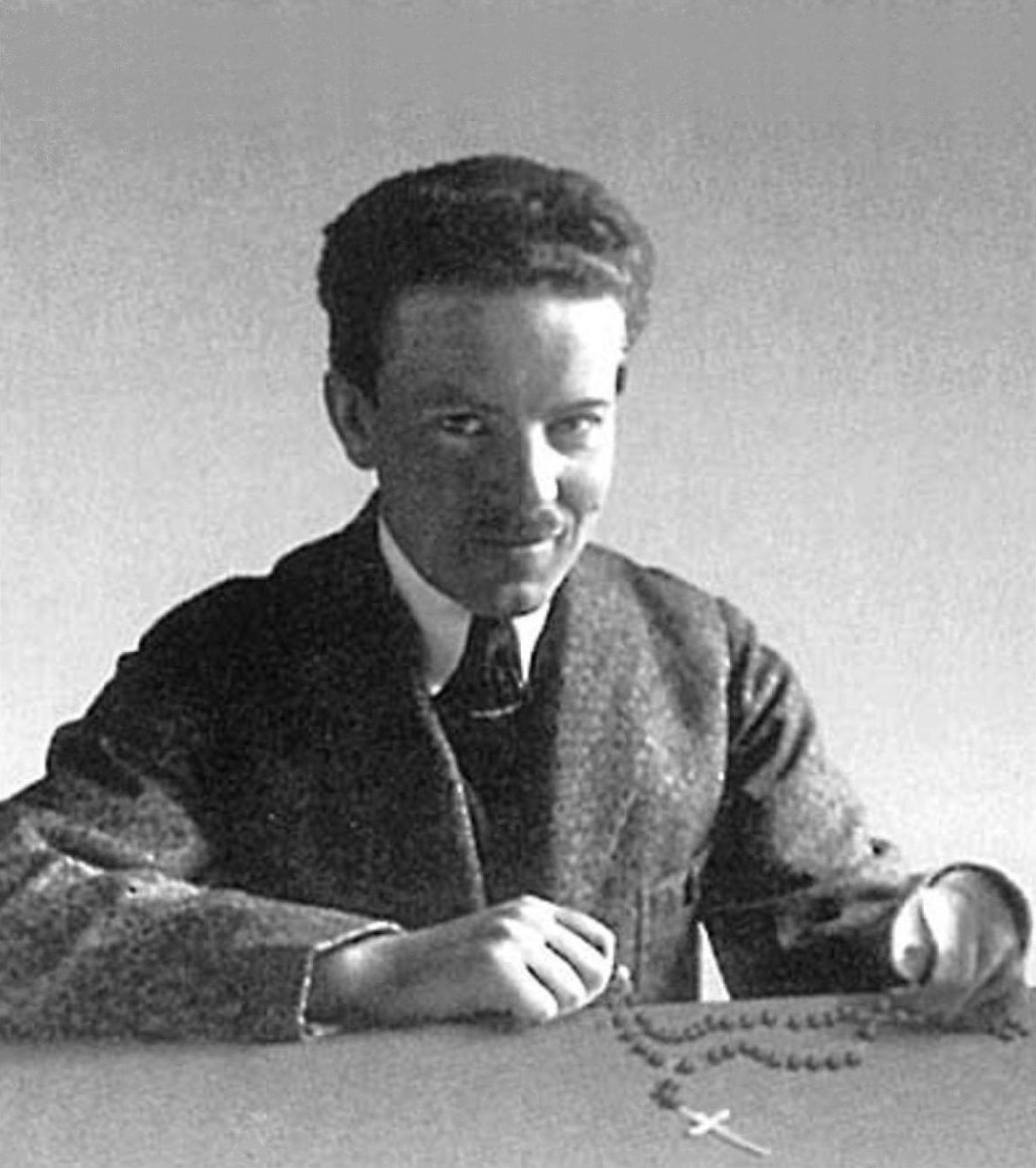
Jan Leopold Tyranowski

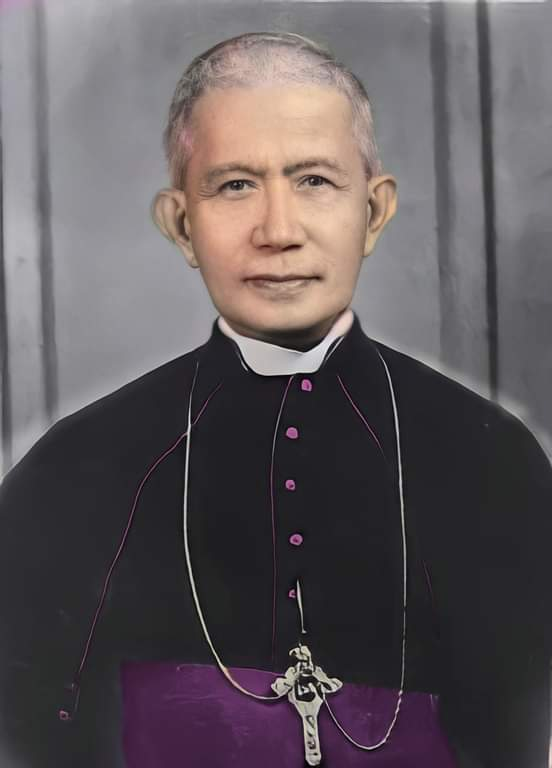
Alfredo Maria Obviar

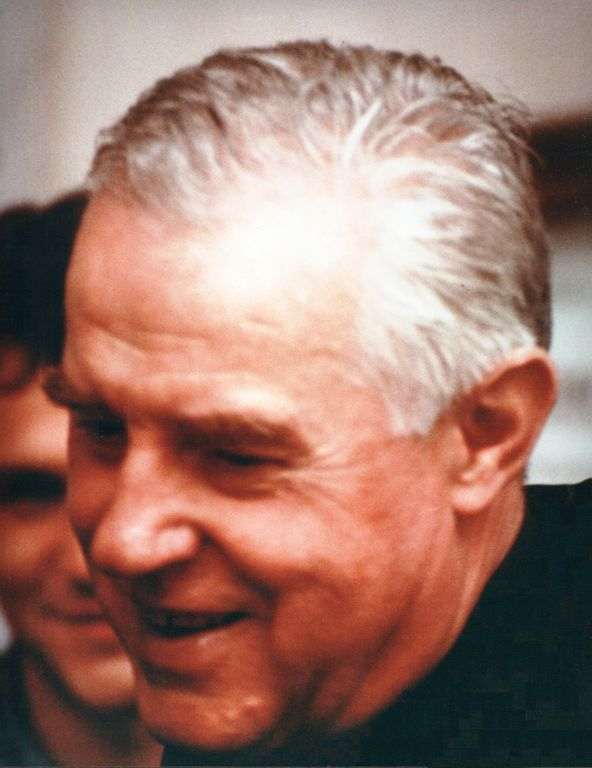
Enzo Boschetti

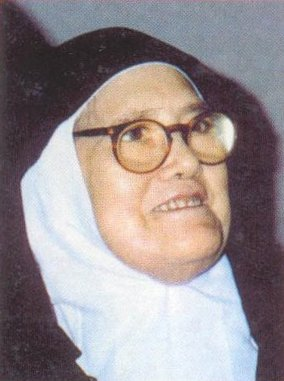
Lucia de Jesus Rosa dos Santos, OCD
- Chiara Maria of the Passion (1610–1675), OCD (Italy)
  - Declared "Venerable": 22 August 1762
- Francisco Pascual Sánchez (rel. name: Francisco of the Child Jesus) (1544–1604), OCD (Spain)
  - Declared "Venerable": 1 January 1769
- Ana de Pedruja Pérez (rel. name: Ana of Saint Augustine) (1555–1624), OCD (Spain)
  - Declared "Venerable": September 15, 1776
- Marguerite Parigot (rel. name: Marguerite of the Blessed Sacrament) (1619–1648), Professed Religious of the Discalced Carmelite Nuns (France)
  - Declared "Venerable": 10 December 1905
- Paula Delpuig Gelabert (rel. name: Paula of Saint Aloysius) (1811–1889), Professed Religious of the Carmelite Sisters of Charity "Vedruna" (Spain)
  - Declared "Venerable": 10 May 1973
- María Teresa González-Quevedo Cadarso (1930–1950), Professed Religious of the Carmelite Sisters of Charity "Vedruna" (Spain)
  - Declared "Venerable": 9 June 1983
- Ildefonso Tomás Sanchez Mayorga (rel. name: Balbino of Carmel) (1865–1934), Professed Priest of the Discalced Carmelites (Spain)
  - Declared "Venerable": 7 September 1989
- Saturnina Jassá Fontcuberta (rel. name: Saturnina of the Agonizing Heart of Jesus) (1851–1936), Cofounder of the Society of Saint Teresa of Jesus (Spain)
  - Declared "Venerable": 3 March 1990
- Antonio Augusto Intreccialagli (rel. name: Antonio of Jesus) (1852–1924), Professed Priest of the Discalced Carmelites; Bishop of Monreale; Cofounder of the Oblates to the Divine Love (Italy)
  - Declared "Venerable": 22 January 1991
- Anita Cantieri (1910–1942), Layperson of the Diocese of Lucca; Member of the Lay Carmelites (Italy)
  - Declared "Venerable": 21 December 1991
- Camila Rolón (rel. name: Camila of Saint Joseph) (1842–1913), Founder of the Poor Sisters of Saint Joseph of Buenos Aires (Argentina – Italy)
  - Declared "Venerable": 2 April 1993
- Leonor López de Maturana Ortiz de Zárate (rel. name: Leonor of Saint Aloysius) (1884–1931), Professed Religious of the Carmelite Sisters of Charity "Vedruna" (Spain – Argentina)
  - Declared "Venerable": 23 December 1993
- Juan Vicente Zengotitabengoa Lausen (rel. name: Juan Vicente of Jesus and Mary) (1862–1943), Professed Priest of the Discalced Carmelites (Spain)
  - Declared "Venerable": 12 January 1996
- Teresa Mira García (rel. name: Teresa of the Infant Jesus of Prague) (1895–1941), Professed Religious of the Teresian Carmelite Missionaries (Spain)
  - Declared "Venerable": 17 December 1996
- Louise-Marie de France (rel. name: Thérèse of Saint Augustine) (1737–1787), Professed Religious of the Discalced Carmelite Nuns (France)
  - Declared "Venerable": 18 December 1997
- Rosa Ojeda Creus (1871–1954), Cofounder of the Carmelite Sisters of Saint Joseph (Spain)
  - Declared "Venerable": 3 July 1998
- Pedro Landeta Azcueta (rel. name: Aureliano of the Blessed Sacrament) (1887–1963), Professed Priest of the Discalced Carmelites (Spain – India)
  - Declared "Venerable": 26 March 1999
- María Luisa [Luisita] de la Peña Navarro de Rojas (rel. name: María Luisa Josefa of the Blessed Sacrament) (1866–1937), Widow; Founder of the Carmelite Sisters of the Sacred Heart of Guadalajara and the Carmelite Sisters of the Most Sacred Heart of Los Angeles (Mexico)
  - Declared "Venerable": 1 July 2000
- Angelo Calvi (rel. name: Benigno of Saint Theresa of the Child Jesus) (1909–1937), Professed Priest of the Discalced Carmelites (Italy)
  - Declared "Venerable": 20 December 2003
- Maria Majone (rel. name: Maria Nazarena) (1869–1939), Cofounder of the Daughters of Divine Zeal (Italy)
  - Declared "Venerable": 20 December 2003
- Teresa Guasch Toda (rel. name: Teresa of the Immaculate Heart of Mary) (1848–1917), Cofounder of the Teresian Carmelite Sisters of Saint Joseph (Spain)
  - Declared "Venerable": 19 April 2004
- María Josefa Segovia Morón (1891–1957), Layperson of the Archdiocese of Madrid; Cofounder of the Teresian Institute (Spain)
  - Declared "Venerable": 19 December 2005
- Lliberada Ferrarons Vivés (1803–1842), Layperson of the Diocese of Girona; Member of the Lay Carmelites (Spain)
  - Declared "Venerable": 17 January 2009
- Bridget Teresa McCrory (rel. name: Mary Angeline Teresa) (1893–1984), Founder of the Carmelite Sisters for the Aged and Infirm (United Kingdom – United States)
  - Declared "Venerable": 28 June 2012
- Janina Kierocińska (rel. name: Maria Teresa of Saint Joseph) (1885–1946), Founder of the Carmelite Sisters of the Child Jesus (Poland)
  - Declared "Venerable": 3 May 2013
- Teresa Toda Juncosa (rel. name: Teresa of Saint Joseph) (1826–1898), Cofounder of the Teresian Carmelite Sisters of Saint Joseph (Spain)
  - Declared "Venerable": June 3, 2013
- Marton Boldizsár (rel. name: Marcell of the Virgin of Carmel) (1877–1966), Professed Priest of the Discalced Carmelites (Hungary)
  - Declared "Venerable": 9 December 2013
- Zacarías Salterain Bizkarra (rel. name: Zacarías of Saint Teresa) (1887–1957), Professed Priest of the Discalced Carmelites (Spain – India)
  - Declared "Venerable": 27 January 2014
- Jesús María Echavarría Aguirre (1858–1954), Bishop of Saltillo; Founder of the Guadalupan Catechist Sisters (Mexico)
  - Declared "Venerable": 7 February 2014
- Sophia Leeves (rel. name: Marie-Veronique of the Passion) (1823–1906), Professed Religious of the Discalced Carmelite Nuns; Founder of the Sisters of Apostolic Carmel (Turkey – France)
  - Declared "Venerable": 8 July 2014
- Josefa Oliver Molina (rel. name: María Elisea) (1869–1931), Founder of the Sisters of the Virgin of Mount Carmel (Spain)
  - Declared "Venerable": 14 June 2016
- Jan Leopold Tyranowski (1901–1947), Layperson of the Archdiocese of Kraków (Poland)
  - Declared "Venerable": 20 January 2017
- Giuseppa Margherita Operti (rel. name:; Maria of the Angels) (1871–1949), Professed Religious of the Discalced Carmelite Nuns; Founder of the Carmelite Sisters of Saint Teresa of Turin (Italy)
  - Declared "Venerable": 16 June 2017
- Carme Badosa Cuatrecasas (rel. name: Arcàngela) (1878–1918), Professed Religious of the Sisters of the Virgin of Mount Carmel (Spain)
  - Declared "Venerable": 7 November 2018
- María Antonia Pereira Andrade (María Antonia of Jesus) (1700–1760), Professed Religious of the Discalced Carmelite Nuns (Spain)
  - Declared "Venerable": 7 November 2018
- Alfredo María Obviar (1889–1978), Bishop of Lucena; Founder of Missionary Catechists of Saint Thérèse of the Infant Jesus (Philippines)
  - Declared "Venerable": 7 November 2018
- Enzo Boschetti (1929–1993), Priest of the Diocese of Pavia (Italy)
  - Declared "Venerable": 11 June 2019
- Ana de Lobera Torres (rel. name: Ana of Jesus) (1545–1621), Professed Religious of the Discalced Carmelite Nuns (Spain – Belgium)
  - Declared "Venerable": 28 November 2019
- Carmen Catarina Bueno (rel. name: Maria do Carmo [Carminha] of the Holy Spirit) (1898–1966), Professed Religious of the Discalced Carmelite Nuns (Brazil)
  - Declared "Venerable": 23 January 2020
- Elisa Giambelluca (1941–1986), Layperson of the Diocese of Cefalù; Member of the Teresian Institute (Italy)
  - Declared "Venerablee": 20 February 2021
- Anna Antonietta Mezzacapo (rel. name: Colomba of Jesus in the Blessed Sacrament) (1914–1969), Professed Religious of the Discalced Carmelite Nuns (Italy)
  - Declared "Venerable": 22 May 2021
- Aldo Brienza (rel. name: Immacolato Giuseppe of Jesus) (1922–1989), Professed Religious of the Discalced Carmelites (Italy)
  - Declared "Venerable": 18 February 2022
- Teofilo Camomot (1914–1988), Coadjutor Archbishop of Cagayan de Oro; Titular Archbishop of Marcianopolis; Founder of the Daughters of Saint Teresa (Philippines)
  - Declared "Venerable": 21 May 2022
- Maria Luiza Resende Marques (rel. name: Tereza Margarida of the Heart of Mary) (1915–2005), Professed Religious of the Discalced Carmelite Nuns (Brazil)
  - Declared "Venerable": 20 May 2023
- Lúcia dos Santos (rel. name: Maria Lúcia of Jesus and the Immaculate Heart) (1907–2005), Professed Religious of the Discalced Carmelite Nuns (Portugal)
  - Declared "Venerable": 22 June 2023
- Maria Giselda Villela (rel. name: Maria Imaculada [Mãezinha] of the Holy Trinity) (1909–1988), Professed Religious of the Discalced Carmelite Nuns (Brazil)
  - Declared "Venerable": 22 January 2026

== Servants of God ==
- Catalina Balmaseda San Martín (rel. name: Catalina of Christ) (1544–1594), Professed Religious of the Discalced Carmelite Nuns (Spain)
- Francisco Ruiz Mejía (rel. name: Francisco of Jesus) (1529–1601), Professed Priest of the Discalced Carmelites (Spain)
- Jerónimo Gracián Dantisco (rel. name: Jerónimo of the Mother of God) (1545–1614), Professed Religious of the Discalced Carmelites (Spain – Belgium)
- Juan San Pedro Ustárroz (Juan of Jesus Mary) (1564–1615), Professed Priest of the Discalced Carmelites (La Rioja, Spain – Rome, Italy)
- Miguel de la Fuente (rel. name: Miguel of Jesus) (1573–1625), Professed Priest of the Discalced Carmelites (Spain)
- Domingo Ruzola López (rel. name: Domingo of Jesus Mary) (1559–1630), Professed Priest of the Discalced Carmelites (Spain – Austria)
- Jean du Moulin (rel. name: Jean of Saint Samson) (1571–1636), Professed Religious of the Carmelites of the Ancient Observance (France)
- Madeleine du Bois de Fontaines (rel. name: Madeleine of Saint Joseph) (1578–1637), Professed Religious of the Discalced Carmelite Nuns (France)
- Marianna Marchocka (rel. name: Teresa of Jesus) (1603–1652), Professed Religious of the Discalced Carmelite Nuns (Poland)
- Maria Margaretha van Valkenisse (rel. name: Maria Margaretha of the Angels) (1605–1658), Professed Religious of the Discalced Carmelite Nuns (Belgium)
- Caterina Tramazzoli (rel. name: Maria Eletta of Jesus) (1605–1663), Professed Religious of the Discalced Carmelite Nuns (Italy – Czech Republic)
- Prudenza Pisa (Serafina of God) (1621–1699), Founder of the Nuns of the Most Holy Savior (now extinct) (Italy)
- Eleonora d'Este (rel. name: Maria Francesca of the Holy Spirit) (1643–1722), Professed Religious of the Discalced Carmelite Nuns (Italy)
- Rosa Maria Serio (rel. name: Rosa Maria of Saint Anthony) (1674–1726), Professed Religious of the Carmelites of the Ancient Observance (Italy)
- Maria Anna Lindmayr (rel. name: Josepha of Jesus) (1657–1726), Professed Religious of the Discalced Carmelite Nuns (Germany)
- Mariangela Virgili (1662–1734), Layperson of the Diocese of Civita Castellana; Member of the Lay Carmelites (Italy)
- Caterina Mazzoni Sangiorgi (rel. name: Maria Maddalena) (1683–1749), Widow; Founder of the Carmelite Sisters of Graces (Bologna, Italy)
- Girolamo Terzo (rel. name: Girolamo of Jesus, Mary and Joseph) (1683–1758), Professed Priest of the Carmelites of the Ancient Observance (Italy)
- Giovanni Antonio Guadagni (rel. name: Giovanni Antonio of Saint Bernard) (1674–1759), Professed Priest of the Discalced Carmelites; Cardinal (Italy)
- Giacomo Antonio Sciutti (rel. name: Isidoro of the Nativity of Mary) (1699–1769), Professed Religious of the Discalced Carmelites; Founder of the Carmelite Teresian Sisters (Italy)
- Marie-Catherine Boullé (rel. name: Marie Claire of Saint Magdalen) (1739–1794), Professed Religious of the Carmelite Nuns of the Ancient Observance; Martyr in odium fidei (France)
- Thoma Malpan Palackal (c. 1780–1841), Priest and Cofounder of the Carmelites of Mary Immaculate (India)
- María Teresa Aycinena Piñol (rel. name: María Teresa of the Holy Trinity) (1874–1841), Professed Religious of the Discalced Carmelite Nuns (Guatemala)
- Camille de Soyécourt (rel. name: Thérèse-Camille of the Child Jesus) (1757–1849), Professed Religious of the Discalced Carmelites Nuns (France)
- Hermann Cohen (rel. name: Augustin-Marie of the Blessed Sacrament) (1820–1871), Professed Priest of the Discalced Carmelites (Germany)
- Louis-Vedaste-Gaston de Sonis (1825–1887), Married Layperson of the Diocese of Chartres; Member of the Secular Carmelites (Guadeloupe – France)
- Maria del Carme do Sojo Ballester de Anguera (1856–1890), Married Layperson of the Archdiocese of Barcelona; Member of the Lay Carmelites (Spain)
- Joan Adelaide O’Sullivan (rel. name: María Adelaida of Saint Teresa) (1817–1893), Professed Religious of the Discalced Carmelite Nuns (United States – Spain)
- Anna Narcisa Maria Soler Pi (rel. name: Anna of Saint Sabina) (1835–1896), Professed Religious of the Carmelite Sisters of Charity "Vedruna" (Spain)
- Mary Grace d'Lima (rel. name: Teresa of Saint Teresa of Lima) (1832–1902), Founder of the Carmelite Sisters of Saint Teresa (India)
- Rita de Cássia Aguiar (rel. name: Maria das Neves) (1815–1906), Widow; Founder of the Carmelite Sisters of Divine Providence (Brazil)
- Józef Kruszewski (rel. name: Wincenty) (1854–1922), Professed Priest of the Carmelites of the Ancient Observance (Poland)
- Theresia Ijsseldijk (rel. name: Theresia of the Most Holy Trinity) (1897–1926), Professed Religious of the Carmelite Sisters of the Divine Heart of Jesus (Netherlands – United States)
- Clara del Carmen Quirós López (rel. name: Clara María of Jesus) (1857–1928), Founder of the Carmelite Sisters of Saint Joseph (El Salvador)
- Pantaleone Palma (1875–1935), Professed Priest of the Rogationists of the Heart of Jesus (Italy)
- Francisca Peneli Ferreres (rel. name: Trinidad) (1886–1936), Professed Religious of the Handmaids of Mary Immaculate; Martyr in odium fidei (Spain)
- Anna Marie Lindenberg (rel. name: Therese of Jesus) (1887– 1939), Professed Religious of the Carmelite Nuns of the Ancient Observance (Germany – United States)
- Anna Maria [Anička] Zelíková (1924–1941), Young Layperson of the Archdiocese of Olomouc; Member of the Lay Carmelites (Czech Republic)
- Adelrich Benziger (rel. name: Aloysius of Saint Mary) (1864–1942), Professed Priest of the Discalced Carmelites; Bishop of Quilon (Switzerland – India)
- Sixto Sosa Díaz (1870–1943), Bishop of Cumaná; Cofounder of the Carmelite Sisters of Venezuela (Carmelites of Mother Candelaria) (Venezuela)
- Lwiġi Fenech (rel. name: Avertan) (1871–1943), Professed Priest of the Carmelites of the Ancient Observance (Malta)
- Ramón Montero Navarro (1930–1944), Child of the Diocese of Ciudad Real; Member of the Lay Carmelites (Spain)
- Lucien-Louis Bunel (rel. name: Jacques of Jesus) (1900–1945), Professed Priest of the Discalced Carmelites; Martyr ex aerumnis carceris (France – Austria)
- Franz Seraph Ehrlich (rel. name: Alois) (1868–1945), Professed Religious of the Carmelites of the Ancient Observance (Germany)
- Carlo Rossi (rel. name: Raffaello of Saint Joseph) (1876–1948), Professed Priest of the Discalced Carmelites; Bishop of Volterra; Cardinal (Italy)
- Teresa Gimma (rel. name: Teresa of Jesus) (1880–1948), Professed Religious of the Discalced Carmelite Nuns (Italy)
- Clare Ellerker [Perrins] (rel. name: Mary of the Blessed Sacrament) (1875–1949), Founder of the Carmelite Sisters of "Corpus Christi" (United Kingdom – Trinidad and Tobago)
- Adolf Piotr Szelążek (1865–1950), Bishop of Lutsk; Founder of the Sisters of Saint Therese of the Child Jesus (Poland)
- Carolina Mancinelli Scampone (1877–1951), Married Layperson of the Diocese of Gaeta; Member of the Lay Carmelites (Italy)
- Santos Franco Sánchez (1942–1954), Child of the Diocese of Córdoba (Spain)
- Giuseppe Mazzanti (1879–1954), Priest of the Diocese of Imola; Founder of the Little Sisters of Saint Theresa of the Child Jesus (Italy)
- Alfredo Verzosa (1877–1954), Bishop of Lipa; Founder of the Missionary Catechists of the Sacred Heart (Ilocos Sur, Philippines)
- Kunegunda Siwiec (1876–1955), Layperson of the Archdiocese of Kraków; Member of the Secular Carmelites (Poland)
- Tomo Stantić (rel. name: Gerard of Saint Stephen) (1876–1956), Professed Priest of the Discalced Carmelites (Serbia)
- Antonietta Zanelli (rel. name: Maria) (1887–1957), Founder of the Little Sisters of Saint Theresa of the Child Jesus (Italy)
- Maximina García Presa (rel. name: Maximina of Jesus Crucified) (1905–1958), Professed Religious of the Society of Saint Teresa of Jesus (Spain)
- Angelo Lolli (1880–1958), Priest of the Archdiocese of Ravenna; Founder of the Sisters of the Little Family of Saint Theresa of the Child Jesus (Italy)
- Honorina de Abreu (rel. name: Maria José of Jesus) (1882–1959), Professed Religious of the Discalced Carmelite Nuns (Brazil)
- María Asunción Soler Gimeno (rel. name: María Asunción of the Cross) (1882–1959), Founder of the Carmelite Sisters of the Sacred Heart of Jesus (Spain)
- Raymond Francis Camillus Mascarenhas (1875–1960), Priest of the Diocese of Mangalore; Founder of the Sisters of the Little Flower of Bethany (India)
- Amata Cerretelli (1907–1963), Priest of the Archdiocese of Florence; Member of the Secular Carmelites (Italy)
- Secundina Guadalupe Olmos (rel. name: Pura Rosa of Carmel) (1896–1965), Professed Religious of the Carmelite Tertiary Sisters of Saint Teresa of Jesus (Argentina)
- Ewġenju Borg (1886–1967), Layperson of the Archdiocese of Malta; Consecrated Member of the Society of Christian Doctrine (Malta)
- Baldiri Xiberta Roqueta (rel. name: Bartomeu Fanti Maria) (1897–1967), Professed Priest of the Carmelites of the Ancient Observance (Spain)
- Florencia Cuesta Valluerca (rel. name: Trinidad of the Sacred Heart of Jesus) (1904–1967), Professed Religious of the Carmelite Nuns of the Ancient Observance (Spain – Philippines)
- Julianus Buyck (rel. name: Adeodatus of Saint Peter) (1896–1968), Professed Priest of the Discalced Carmelites (Belgium – India)
- Ulisse Amendolagine (1893–1969) and Leila Cossidente Amendolagine (1893–1951), Married Laypersons of the Vicariate of Rome; Member of the Secular Carmelites (Italy)
- Maciej Józef Gądek (rel. name: Anzelm of Saint Andrew Corsini) (1884–1969), Professed Priest of the Discalced Carmelites; Founder of the Carmelite Sisters of the Child Jesus (Poland)
- Isabella [Bina] Morfini (1889–1969), Layperson of the Diocese of Bari-Bitonto; Member of the Secular Carmelites (Italy)
- Giuseppe Carbonaro (rel. name: Elia) (1893–1973), Professed Priest of the Carmelites of the Ancient Observance (Italy)
- Rufino Zazpe Zabalza (rel. name: Rufino of the Virgin of Carmel) (1891–1977), Professed Religious of the Discalced Carmelites (Spain – Chile)
- María Cristina Alonso y Alonso (rel. name: María Cristina of the Eucharist) (1930–1979), Professed Religious of the Carmelite Nuns of the Ancient Observance (Spain)
- María Cristina de los Reyes Olivera (rel. name: María Cristina of Jesus in the Blessed Sacrament) (1890–1980), Professed Religious of the Discalced Carmelite Nuns (Spain)
- Gabriel Paulino Bueno Couto (1910–1982), Professed Priest of the Carmelites of the Ancient Observance; Bishop of Jundiaí (Brazil)
- María Ligia Arango Siegert (rel. name: María Teresa of Jesus) (1915–1984), Professed Priest of the Discalced Carmelite Nuns (Colombia)
- Carlo Zucchetti (rel. name: Marcello of the Immaculata) (1914–1984), Professed Priest of the Discalced Carmelites (Italy)
- Sergio Sorgon (rel. name: Sergio of Saint Joseph) (1938–1985), Professed Priest of the Discalced Carmelites; Martyr in odium fidei (Italy – Madagascar)
- Leone Ramognino (rel. name: Giaocchino [Nino] of the Queen of Peace) (1890–1985), Professed Religious of the Discalced Carmelites (Italy)
- Marie Françoise Camélia Lohier (1927–1987), Cofounder of the Little Sisters of Saint Therese of the Child Jesus and the Little Brothers of Saint Therese of the Child Jesus (Haiti)
- María Isabel Zapata de Calatayud Benavent (rel. name: María Isabel of Merciful Love) (1907–1987), Professed Religious of the Discalced Carmelite Nuns (Spain)
- Louis Farnèse Louis-Charles (1905–1988), Priest of the Archdiocese of Port-au-Prince; Cofounder of the Little Sisters of Saint Therese of the Child Jesus and the Little Brothers of Saint Therese of the Child Jesus (Haiti)
- Enrique Esteve Francisco (rel. name: Enrique María) (1905–1990), Professed Priest of the Discalced Carmelites (Spain)
- María Israel Bogotá Baquero (1943–1991), Professed Religious of the Carmelites of Mother Candelaria; Martyr in defensum castitatis (Colombia – Venezuela)
- Devasya Kaniyarakath (rel. name: Bruno) (1894–1991), Professed Priest of the Carmelites of Mary Immaculate (India)
- Giuseppe Marazzo (1917–1992), Professed Priest of the Rogationists of the Heart of Jesus (Italy)
- Josefa María Reig Gozalbes (rel. name: Margarita María of the Eucharistic Heart of Jesus) (1908–1992), Professed Religious of the Discalced Carmelite Nuns (Spain)
- Annakutty Payyappilly (rel. name: Mary Celine) (1906–1993), Professed Religious of the Congregation of the Mother of Carmel (India)
- Edoardo Vigani (rel. name: Maurizio of the Child Jesus) (1935–1997), Professed Priest of the Discalced Carmelites (Italy)
- Salvador Rivera García (rel. name: Salvador of the Immaculate Heart of Jesus) (1934–1997), Professed Religious of the Discalced Carmelites (Mexico)
- Ouseph Thekkekara (rel. name: Canisius of Saint Teresa) (1914–1998), Professed Priest of the Carmelites of Mary Immaculate (India)
- Anastasio Alberto Ballestrero (rel. name: Anastasio of the Holy Rosary) (1913–1998), Professed Priest of the Discalced Carmelites; Archbishop of Turin; Cardinal (Italy)
- Maria de la Concepciò D'Oleza Gualde (rel. name: Maria de la Concepciò of Saint James and Saint Teresa) (1905–1999), Professed Religious of the Discalced Carmelite Nuns (Spain)
- Stanisław Warzecha (rel. name: Rudolf of the Transverberation of Saint Teresa) (1919–1999), Professed Priest of the Discalced Carmelites (Poland)
- Adela Sesso (rel. name: María Bernardita of the Immaculate) (1918–2001), Professed Religious of the Poor Sisters of Saint Joseph of Buenos Aires (Italy)
- Alfonso María López Sendín (1906–2002), Professed Priest of the Carmelites of the Ancient Observance (Spain)
- Mireya Asunta Escalante Innecco (rel. name: Lucia of the Child Jesus and of the Holy Face) (1918–2003), Professed Religious of the Discalced Carmelites (Venezuela)
- Stanisław Pikoń (rel. name: Cherubin of the Blessed Virgin Mary) (1921–2003), Professed Priest of the Discalced Carmelites; Founder of the Secular Carmelite Institute "Elianum" (Poland)
- María Isabel Trinidad Marco Garmendia (rel. name: María Josefa of the Heart of Jesus) (1915–2004), Professed Religious of the Discalced Carmelite Nuns (Spain)
- Jean-Thierry Ebogo (rel. name: Jean-Thierry of the Child Jesus and of the Passion) (1982–2006), Professed Cleric of the Discalced Carmelites (Cameroon – Italy)
- Teresa Encarnación Crespo Roig (rel. name: María Carmen) (1912–2006), Professed Religious of the Carmelite Nuns of the Ancient Observance (Spain)
- Giuseppe Aveni (1918–2010), Professed Priest of the Rogationists of the Heart of Jesus (Italy – Philippines)
- Victor Rodríguez Martínez (1925–2012), Married Layperson of the Archdiocese of Valladolid; Member of the Lay Carmelites (Spain)
- Mercedes Reyes Sánchez (rel. name: Mercedes of Saint Therese) (1930–2012), Professed Religious of the Discalced Carmelite Nuns (Colombia)
- Agostino Bartolini (1918–2012), Professed Priest of the Discalced Carmelites (Italy)
- Clare Theresa Crockett (rel. name: Clare Maria of the Trinity and the Heart of Mary) (1982–2016), Professed Religious of the Servant Sisters of the Home of the Mother (United Kingdom – Peru)
- Cecilia María Sánchez Sorondo (rel. name: Cecilia María of the Holy Face) (1973–2016), Professed Religious of the Discalced Carmelite Nuns (Argentina)
- Sophia Maria Esteves de Mello (rel. name: Maria Angélica da Eucaristia) (1931–2018), Professed Religious of the Discalced Carmelite Nuns (Brazil)

== Candidates for sainthood ==
- Pedro de Villagrasa Ablanque (rel. name: Pedro of the Mother of God) (1565–1608), Professed Priest of the Discalced Carmelite Nuns (Spain)
- Isabel Ortega (rel. name: Isabel of Saint Dominic) (1537–1623), Professed Religious of the Discalced Carmelite Nuns (Spain)
- Macario Demeski (rel. name: Macario of the Blessed Sacrament) (1570–1624), Professed Priest of the Discalced Carmelites; Martyr in odium fidei (Poland)
- Tomás Díaz Sánchez Dávila (rel. name: Tomás of Jesus) (1564–1624), Professed Priest of the Discalced Carmelites (Spain)
- Lelio Ubaldini (rel. name: Alessandro of Saint Francis) (1584–1630), Professed Priest of the Discalced Carmelites (Italy)
- Francisco Sánchez Hernández (rel. name: Francisco of the Cross) (1585–1647), Professed Priest of the Carmelites of the Ancient Observance (Spain)
- Cecilia Sobrino Morillas (rel. name: Cecilia of the Nativity) (1570–1646), Professed Religious of the Discalced Carmelite Nuns (Spain)
- Margriet von Noort (rel. name: Margaret of the Mother of God) (1587–1646), Professed Religious of the Discalced Carmelite Nuns (Netherlands)
- María Muñoz Sánchez (rel. name: María of Jesus and the Thorns) (1589–1662), Professed Religious of the Carmelite Nuns of the Ancient Observance (Spain)
- Caterina Farnese (rel. name: Teresa Margarita of the Incarnation) (1637–1663), Professed Priest of the Discalced Carmelite Nuns (Italy)
- Giacinta Francesca Ricchi (rel. name: Cherubina of the Lamb of God) (1601–1663), Professed Religious of the Discalced Carmelite Nuns (Italy)
- Margarita Forni (rel. name: Ana María of Saint Joachim) (1620–1668), Professed Religious of the Discalced Carmelite Nuns (Italy)
- Juan Beltrán Salvador (rel. name: Juan of Jesus and Saint Joachim) (1590–1669), Professed Priest of the Discalced Carmelites (Spain)
- Ana Puttemans (1623–1673), Founder of the Maricolean Congregation (Netherlands)
- Nicholas Schokwielerg (rel. name: Cyril of the Mother of God) (1590–1675), Professed Priest of the Discalced Carmelites (Luxembourg – Czech Republic)
- Marie Petijt (rel. name: Marie of Saint Thérèse) (1623–1677), Layperson of the Archdiocese of Mechelen–Brussels; Member of the Lay Carmelites (Belgium)
- Margaret Mostyn (rel. name: Margaret of Jesus) (1625–1679), Professed Religious of the Discalced Carmelite Nuns (United Kingdom – Belgium)
- Jan van Ballaert (rel. name: Michael of Saint Augustine) (1622–1684), Professed Priest of the Carmelites of the Ancient Observance (Belgium)
- Pierre van Stern (rel. name: Hermann of Saint Norbert) (1629–1686), Professed Priest of the Discalced Carmelites; Founder of the Maricolean Congregation (Netherlands)
- Nicolas Herman (rel. name: Lawrence of the Resurrection) (c. 1614–1691), Professed Religious of the Discalced Carmelites (France)
- Marianna Sousa (rel. name: Mariana of the Purification) (1623–1695), Professed Religious of the Carmelite Nuns of the Ancient Observance (Portugal)
- Francisca Beltrán de Caycedo (Francisca María of the Child Jesus) (1665–1708), Professed Religious of the Discalced Carmelite Nuns (Colombia)
- Antonia Lucía Maldonado Verdugo (rel. name: Antonia Lucía of the Holy Spirit) (1646–1709), Founder of the Carmelite Nazarenes (Ecuador – Peru)
- Françoise Louise de La Baume Le Blanc, Duchess of La Vallière (rel. name: Louise of Mercy) (1644–1710), Professed Religious of the Discalced Carmelite Nuns (France)
- Catharine Burton (rel. name: Mary Xaveria of the Angels) (1668–1714), Professed Religious of the Discalced Carmelite Nuns (United Kingdom – Netherlands)
- Giovanni Domenico Lucchesi (1652–1714), Professed Priest of the Carmelites of the Ancient Observance (Italy)
- Jean Dubois (1653–1721), Priest of the Diocese of Coutances; Member of the Secular Carmelites; Founder of the Sisters of Our Lady of Mount Carmel (France)
- Luisa Zaragozá Rico de Hernandorena (1647–1727), Married Layperson of the Archdiocese of Valencia; Member of the Lay Carmelites (Spain)
- Stefano Pelosio (1689–1763), Professed Priest of the Carmelites of the Ancient Observance (Italy)
- Magdalena Morice (1736–1767), Professed Religious of the Carmelite Nuns of the Ancient Observance (France – Italy)
- Jacinta Rodrigues Aires (rel. name: Jacinta of Saint Joseph) (1715–1768), Professed Religious of the Discalced Carmelite Nuns (Brazil)
- Salvatore Pagnani (1685–1771), Professed Priest of the Carmelites of the Ancient Observance (Italy)
- Ernestine Theodora von Pfalz-Sulzbach (rel. name: Augusta) (1697–1775), Professed Religious of the Carmelite Nuns of the Ancient Observance (Germany)
- Felicia Araneo (rel. name: María de Jesús of the Holy Trinity) (1723–1803), Professed Religious of the Discalced Carmelite Nuns (Italy)
- José Antonio Campos Julián (rel. name: José Antonio of Saint Albert) (1727–1804), Professed Priest of the Discalced Carmelites; Archbishop of La Plata; Founder of the Carmelite Sisters of Saint Teresa of Jesus (Spain – Bolivia)
- Elisabeth Roux (rel. name: Thérèse-Isabelle of the Heart of Mary) (1761–1826), Professed Religious of the Discalced Carmelite Nuns (France)
- Frances Dickinson (Clare Joseph of the Heart of Jesus) (1755–1830), Professed Religious of the Discalced Carmelite Nuns (United Kingdom – United States)
- José Francisco de Acevedo Polo (rel. name: José María of Mount Carmel) (1763–1837), Professed Priest of the Discalced Carmelites (Spain)
- Thérèse-Monique Carlin (1785–1844), Founder of the Sisters of Saint Thérèse of Avesnes (France)
- Perrine Éluère (rel. name: Marie of Saint Peter) (1816–1848), Professed Religious of the Discalced Carmelite Nuns (France)
- João Luís Peixoto (rel. name: João of the Ascension) (1787–1861), Professed Priest of the Discalced Carmelites (Portugal)
- Marie Moreau (rel. name: Marie-Joseph) (1788–1864), Founder of the Sisters of Providence of La Pommeraye (France)
- Dorothée Quoniam (rel. name: Marie-Aimée of Jésus) (1839–1874), Professed Religious of the Discalced Carmelite Nuns (France)
- Julie Thérèse Chevrel (rel. name: Thérèse of the Cross) (1806–1888), Founder of the Sisters of Mount Carmel (France – United States)
- María Dias de Araújo (rel. name: María of the Conception) (1808–1888), Professed Religious of the Discalced Carmelite Nuns (Portugal – Spain)
- Gilbert Bauduz (1812–1891), Priest of the Diocese of Nantes; Founder of the Apostolic Carmelites of Our Lady of Bethlehem (France)
- Léontine Jarre (rel. name: Marguerite-Marie of the Sacred Heart) (1830–1892), Founder of the Carmelite Nuns of Saint Joseph (France)
- Jacob Kaniyanthara (1800–1898), Professed Religious of the Carmelites of Mary Immaculate (India)
- Paweł Styczeń (rel. name: Jozafat of Saint Joseph) (1866–1902), Professed Priest of the Discalced Carmelites (Poland)
- Luis Gonzaga de la Torre Baeza (1833–1911), Priest of the Archdiocese of Puebla de los Ángeles; Founder of the Daughters of Saint Mary of Guadalupe (Mexico)
- Marie-Antoinette de Geuser (1889–1911), Layperson of the Diocese of La Havre (France)
- Eduviges Wielhorska (rel. name: Eduviges of the Cross) (1836–1911), Professed Religious of the Discalced Carmelite Nuns (Poland)
- Yvonne Bisiaux (rel. name: Marie-Angélique of Jesus) (1893–1919), Professed Religious of the Discalced Carmelite Nuns (France)
- Maria Cecylia Grocholski (rel. name: Maria Ksawery of Jesus) (1833–1928), Professed Religious of the Discalced Carmelite Nuns (Poland)
- Quintino Rodrigues de Oliveira Silva (1863–1929), Bishop of Crato; Founder of the Daughters of Saint Teresa of Jesus (Brazil)
- Francisca Javiera del Valle (1856–1930), Layperson of the Diocese of Palencia; Member of the Secular Carmelites (Spain)
- Alessandra Starabba di Rudinì (rel. name: Maria of Jesus) (1876–1931), Professed Religious of the Discalced Carmelite Nuns (Italy)
- Clemencia Mosca (rel. name: Maria of Jesus) (1862–1934), Cofounder of the Sisters of Our Lady of Mount Carmel (Italy)
- Marie Rouyer (rel. name: Marie-Bernarde of the Immaculate Conception) (1904–1935), Professed Religious of the Discalced Carmelite Nuns (France)
- Serafina Mur Anzano (rel. name: Serafina of the Virgin of Pilar) (1855–1938), Professed Religious of the Discalced Carmelite Nuns (Spain)
- Ignacy Kozicki (rel. name: Franciszek of the Visitation) (1897–1941), Professed Priest of the Discalced Carmelites (Poland)
- Adolfo Aguilar León (rel. name: Bernardo of Saint Mary) (1863–1942), Professed Priest of the Discalced Carmelites; Founder of the Carmelite Missionaries of Saint Therese of the Child Jesus (Mexico)
- Madeleine-Marie-Justine Dupont (rel. name: Marie of Jesus) (1851–1942), Professed Religious of the Discalced Carmelite Nuns (France – United Kingdom)
- Rosa Adelheid Stein (1883–1942), Layperson of the Archdiocese of Köln; Member of the Secular Carmelites (Poland)
- Elena María Thierry (rel. name: María Elías of the Blessed Sacrament) (1879–1943), Professed Religious of the Discalced Carmelite Nuns (Mexico – United States)
- Carlo Verona (rel. name: Marcello of the Martyrs) (1919–1944), Professed Priest of the Discalced Carmelites; Martyr in odium fidei (Italy)
- August Wörndl (rel. name: Paulus) (1894–1944), Professed Priest of the Discalced Carmelites; Martyr in odium fidei (Austria)
- Ana Alvares Couto (1885–1947), Founder of the Daughters of Santa Teresa of Jesus (Brazil)
- Herculano Gonçalves (1868–1950), Priest of the Archdiocese of Goa and Daman; Founder of the Servants of Christ (India)
- Beatriz Violante Echenique (rel. name: Teresa of the Divine Heart) (1879–1950), Founder of the Carmelite Missionaries of Saint Therese of the Child Jesus (Mexico)
- Berta Grialou (1902–1958), Layperson of the Archdiocese of Avignon; Member of the Secular Carmelites (France)
- Marie-Victoire Pagot (rel. name: Thérèse of Jesus) (1882–1958), Professed Religious of the Discalced Carmelite Nuns (France – Philippines)
- Béatrix Douillard (rel. name: Marie-Thérèse of Mercy) (1878–1959), Founder of the Oblates of Saint Therese of the Child Jesus (France)
- Jan Mazurek (rel. name: Bogumilo of Saint Josaphat) (1874–1960), Professed Priest of the Discalced Carmelites (Poland)
- Alice Rogers (rel. name: Aloysius of the Blessed Sacrament) (1880–1961), Professed Priest of the Discalced Carmelite Nuns (United States)
- José Alberdi Aguirre (rel. name: José Agustín of the Sacred Heart of Jesus) (1879–1962), Professed Religious of the Discalced Carmelites (Spain – Italy)
- Faustino Martínez de la Fuente (rel. name: Faustino of Saint Joseph) (1898–1962), Professed Religious of the Discalced Carmelites (Spain)
- Jan Nepomucen Prus (rel. name: Józef of the Queen of Carmel) (1900–1962), Professed Priest of the Discalced Carmelites; Founder of the Secular Carmelite Institute "Elianum" (Poland)
- Gerald Michael Fitzgerald (1894–1969), Priest and Founder of the Servants of the Paraclete and the Handmaids of the Precious Blood (Massachusetts – New Mexico, USA)
- Marie Pila (1896–1974), Layperson of the Archdiocese of Avignon; Cofounder of the Secular Institute "Notre-Dame de Vie" (France)
- Erasmus Filek (rel. name: Jakubinus of Saint Gerard) (1907–1976), Professed Priest of the Discalced Carmelites (Poland)
- Lorenz van den Eerenbeemt (rel. name: Ettore) (1886–1977), Professed Priest of the Carmelites of the Ancient Observance; Founder of the Carmelite Missionary Sisters of Saint Therese of the Child Jesus (Italy)
- Nicola Cerbone (1892–1980), Priest of the Diocese of Vallo della Lucania; Founder of the Servants of Saint Therese of the Child Jesus (Italy)
- Natividad Zialcita (rel. name: Mary Cecilia of Jesus) (1908–1982), Professed Religious of the Discalced Carmelite Nuns (Manila – Philippines)
- Rosa Isabel Raskosky Paez (1904–1983), Layperson of the Archdiocese of Managua; Member of the Lay Carmelites (Nicaragua)
- Josefina Mulinacci (1895–1987), Professed Member and Founder of the Teresian Carmelite Union Secular Institute (Italy)
- Guido Polli (rel. name: Luigi of the Immaculate) (1911–1987), Professed Priest of the Discalced Carmelites; Founder of the Teresian Carmelite Union Secular Institute (Italy)
- Jessica Powers (Miriam of the Holy Spirit) (1905–1988), Professed Religious of the Discalced Carmelite Nuns (United States)
- Prisciliano Fernández Arenillas (rel. name: Valentín of Saint Joseph) (1896–1989), Professed Priest of the Discalced Carmelites (Spain)
- Felisa Urrutia Langarica (1913–1991), Professed Religious of the Carmelite Sisters of Charity "Vedruna"; Martyr in defensum mulieribus (Spain – Venezuela)
- Dora Motroni (rel. name: Ancilla Maria of the Cross) (1915–1994), Professed Priest of the Discalced Carmelite Nuns (United States – Italy)
- Emilian Vettath (1902–1994), Professed Priest of the Carmelites of Mary Immaculate (India)
- Elisabeth Van Keerbergen (1908–1994), Layperson of the Diocese of Santander; Cofounder of the Servant Brothers of the Home of the Mother and the Servant Sisters of the Home of the Mother (Belgium – Spain)
- Victorina Vicente (rel. name: Mary Therese of the Holy Face) (1921–1995), Founder of the Sisters of the Holy Face of Jesus and the Adoration Sisters of the Holy Face of Jesus (Philippines)
- María Pilar Rodríguez (rel. name: María Pilar of Jesus) (1917–1997), Professed Religious of the Discalced Carmelite Nuns (Spain – Peru)
- Shmuel Oswald Rufeisen (rel. name: Daniel Maria of the Sacred Heart of Jesus) (1922–1998), Professed Priest of the Discalced Carmelites (Poland – Israel)
- Gino Bartali (1914–2000), Married Layperson of the Archdiocese of Florence; Member of the Secular Carmelites (Italy)
- Donal Raymond Lamont (1911–2003), Professed Priest of the Carmelites of the Ancient Observance; Bishop of Umtali (Ireland – South Africa)
- Venard Poslusney (1917–2005), Professed Priest of the Carmelites of the Ancient Observance (United States)
- Janina Adamska (rel. name: Maryja Niepokalana of the Holy Spirit) (1922–2007), Professed Religious of the Discalced Carmelite Nuns (Poland)
- Hilaria Meoli (rel. name: María Hilaria of Saint Therese of the Child Jesus) (1970–2007), Professed Religious of the Carmelite Sisters of Saint Teresa of Turin (Italy – Central African Republic)
- Carolina Meregalli (rel. name: Maria Luisa of Saint Joseph) (1913–2008), Professed Religious of the Carmelite Sisters of Saint Teresa of Turin (Italy)
- Thomas (Kunjumon) Pandippally (1971–2008), Professed Priest of the Carmelites of Mary Immaculate; Martyr in odium fidei (India)
- Georges Celest Stinissen (Wilfrid of the Christ the King) (1927–2013), Professed Priest of the Discalced Carmelites (Belgium – Sweden)
- Jakub Filek (rel. name: Otto of the Angels) (1918–2014), Professed Priest of the Discalced Carmelites (Poland)
- Maria do Carmo Medeiros de Barros (rel. name: Mary of the Trinity) (1921–2017), Professed Religious of the Discalced Carmelite Nuns (Brazil)
- Anna Schwarzova (rel. name: Maria Magdalena of the Wounds) (1921–2017), Professed Religious of the Discalced Carmelite Nuns (Poland)
- Belén Pery Osborne (rel. name: Belén of the Cross) (1984–2018), Professed Religious of the Discalced Carmelite Nuns (Spain)
- Ann Russell Miller (rel. name: Mary Joseph of the Trinity) (1928–2021), Professed Religious of the Carmelite Nuns of the Ancient Observance (United States)
- Pablo Alonso Hidalgo (rel. name: Pablo María of the Cross) (2001–2023), Professed Religious of the Carmelites of the Ancient Observance (Spain)

== Group Martyrs ==
=== Martyrs killed in odium fidei by the Nazis ===
- Emil Szramek (1887–1942), Priest of the Archdiocese of Katowice (Poland)
- Józef Mazurek (rel. name: Alfons Maria of the Holy Spirit) (1891–1944), Professed Priest of the Discalced Carmelites (Poland)
- Paweł Januszewski (rel. name: Hilary) (1907–1945), Professed Priest of the Carmelites of the Ancient Observance (Poland)
  - Declared "Venerable": 26 March 1999
  - Beatified: 13 June 1999 by Pope John Paul II

=== Martyrs of Compiègne ===
- Beatified: 27 May 1906 by Pope Pius X
- Canonized: 18 December 2024 by Pope Francis

== See also ==
- List of Dominican saints and beatified and on canonisation process
