= Anna Maria Marchocka =

Discalced Carmelite and writer (1603–1652)

Servant of God Tereza of Jesus OCD
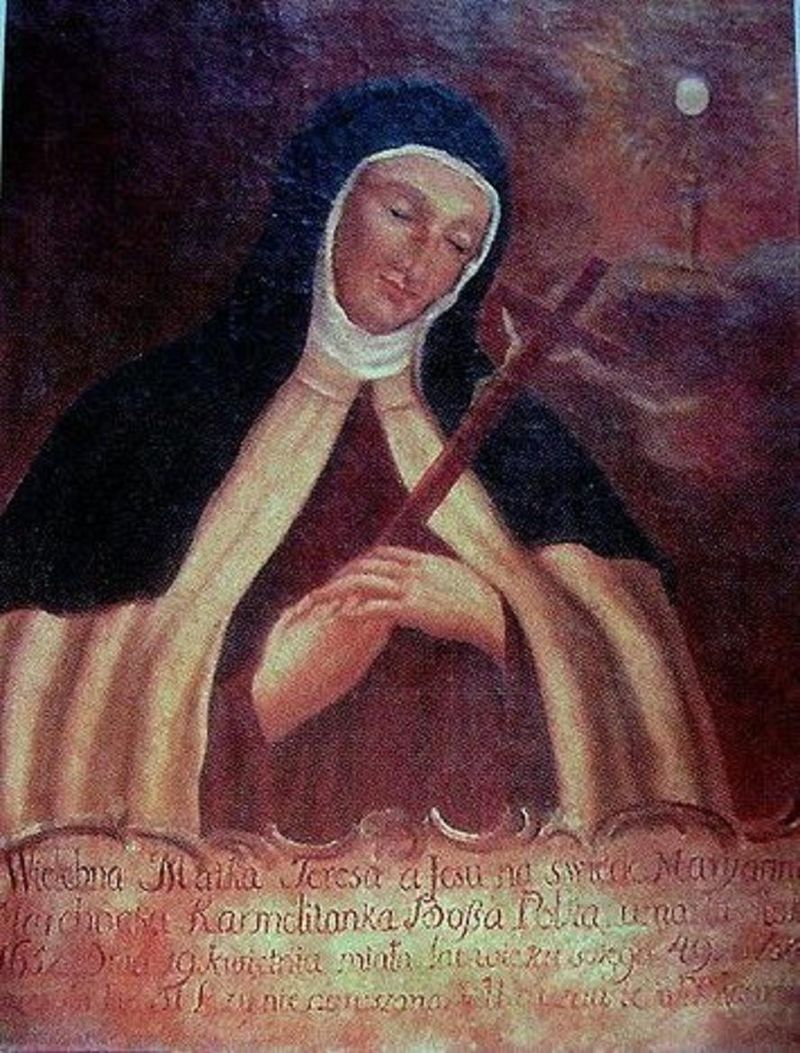
- Sister Teresa of Jesus
- Born: 25 June 1603; Stróże, Poland
- Died: 19 April 1652 (aged 48); Warsaw, Poland

Anna Maria Marchocka, OCD (June 25, 1603 – April 19, 1652), born as Marianna Marchocka, religious name Teresa of Jesus, was a Discalced Carmelite nun and writer during the Counter-Reformation. Marchocka's spiritual autobiography is believed to be the first of its kind composed by a woman in Poland.

== Early life and education ==
Marchocka was born on June 25, 1603, in southern Poland, near Nowy Sącz, which was a heavily Protestant area at the time of her birth. She was born into an aristocratic, politically active family, during the latter half of what some historians claim to be Poland's Golden Age. During this time, the Polish Parliament grew to check the king's power, territories were consolidated, religious diversity was tolerated, and more members of the aristocracy started pursuing university educations.

Marchocka was educated at home by her mother, from whom she learned to read and write and also learned some elementary Latin. Marchocka, like most medieval and early modern women, had limited educational opportunities, and was educated in "strict adherence to the Catholic faith," using religious texts including Piotr Skarga's Lives of the Saints and the writings of Carmelite nun and Catholic saint Mary Magdalene de’ Pazzi.

=== Religious life ===
In her autobiography, Marchocka claims that she was called to the religious life at a young age, and as a young girl pledged to God that she would remain chaste. However, she was initially hesitant to take orders out of fear that she was unworthy, and because of concerns she had with the monastic life. Marchocka documented that when she was 12, her older sister entered St. Clare's Convent in Nowy Sącz. She visited the convent with her parents several times and wrote critically of the way the nunnery was run, noting that she was dismayed that the "rule of silence was not maintained" and that she witnessed various other forms of misbehavior. It was during a visit to St. Claire's that Marchocka was given a copy of Carmelite reformer and Counter-Reformation author Teresa of Ávila's autobiography and began to learn about the Carmelites.

Marchocka entered the Carmelite convent in Kraków at the age of 17. Over the course of her tenure in the convent, she ascended to the rank of prioress, and grew to be admired by her sisters for her saintly lifestyle and her "contemplative prayer". She was also seen as a protective spirit in the convent, and it was believed that her prayers saved Carmelite nuns in Lviv from the Cossacks invasion of April 16, 1649. Marchocka died on April 19, 1652, in Warsaw, Poland.

== Autobiography ==
Marchocka began writing her autobiography on May 3, 1647. After its release to the public, her story became a symbol for Polish piety during the Counter-Reformation, and was used by her followers to revitalize Polish devotion. According to Marchocka, she began writing after her confessor, Father Ignatius of Saint John the Evangelist, instructed her to write about her life, and therefore confess all of her sins.

=== Writing style ===
Marchocka's autobiography is not a neat, chronological timeline of her life. Instead, it is disjointed, fragmented, and merges stories from both her family life and her own spiritual journey. Her language is simple, and she does not clutter her writing with complex rhetorical devices or even excerpts of liturgical texts. Marchocka's autobiography contains several elements typically found in the hagiography of saints, including miraculous events like premonitions and visions of the Virgin Mary. Marchocka wrote that she had the power of clairvoyance and had a premonition of her father's death before it happened.

Despite the hagiographical elements of the autobiography, Marchocka wrote in a much different style than that used by the writers of saints’ vitae. Instead of writing in the objective third person voice, as was common in many saints’ vitae, Marchocka wrote her story in her own voice, thus injecting her own emotions into the text. She began her autobiography with descriptions of her family life and stories of events from before she was born. One of these stories described her mother, Elzbieta Modrzejowska, falling out of a carriage while pregnant with Anna Maria. Another story recounted when her mother almost gave birth in church. Marchocka interpreted these events as signs from God that she was destined to live her life devoted to God.

Former professor at Yale Divinity School Roland H. Bainton divided Marchocka's autobiography into the five stages of her religious journey. In the first stage, she is alienated from God – her soul is suffering, and unable to feel or imagine. The second stage is characterized by bitterness and desperation, but the third stage relieves this suffering, and God is no longer hiding "himself in thick darkness." Bainton claims that in the fourth stage, God completely overtakes her, and at last, in the fifth stage, the soul "stands naked before God." The final stage is also the point during which her suffering is finally relieved through complete devotion to the church.

The following prayer is an excerpt from Marchocka's autobiography, and exemplifies her desire for a life devoted to God:

"Oh my Father, Thou knowest, Oh Lord, my desire and I know that neither thought, nor word, nor imagination can attain. I beseech Thee, Oh merciful God, grant unto me light and learning that I write not which is not work to be written. Let me not be subject to passing fancy, nor to the base and vile, the empty, futile, and worthless. Suffer me not to sink in the slough of doom. O glorious God! Deliver me to be blessed forever. Humbly I beseech Thee, my father. Cover me with Thy pinions, enlighten mine eyes that I wander not in a haze, knowing not what to write nor where. Let me but know Thee, Oh God.”

=== Publication ===
Father Ignatius of St. John the Evangelist, who was the first person to encourage Marchocka to document her life, created the first manuscript copy of her autobiography two years after her death, in 1654. He titled the work The Life of Sister Teresa of Jesus. His manuscript was later published in Lviv, Ukraine, which at the time belonged to Poland. As with the stories of many saints and religious figures in the Middle Ages and early modern period, Marchocka's book was circulated around Poland after her death and made her a popular religious role model. Her autobiography was a symbol for Polish piety during the 17th and 18th centuries, and perhaps even gained notoriety comparable to the autobiography of Saint Teresa of Avila.

Karol Górski published Marchocka's complete collection of writings in 1939, and gave her autobiography its present title – Mystical Autobiography (translated from the Polish Autobiografia mistyczna). Marchocka's original manuscript, Father Ignatius’ first copy, as well as two other handwritten copies, were all destroyed during World War II. In the introduction of his edition of Mystical Autobiography, Górski noted that there were some minor differences between the editions, and attributed those differences to scribes’ efforts to correct Marchocka's spelling and grammar.

Marchocka's autobiography, letters, notes and prayers, with the exception of limited excerpts, have never been published in English.
