= Santos Franco Sánchez =

Spanish candidate for Catholic sainthood

Santos Franco Sánchez (6 July 1942 – 6 February 1954) was a Spanish boy who is being considered for sainthood by the Roman Catholic Church.

Born into a Catholic family, Sánchez attended Catholic schools. An ordinary child who got into his share of mischief, he is remembered by his family as good-natured and quick to apologize if he did something wrong. He was also bright and inquisitive. He wanted to be a Carmelite priest when he grew up.

Santos developed meningitis in November 1953 and suffered a great deal, but offered up the suffering for the conversion of sinners. During his final illness he had visions of the Child Jesus surrounded by angels and flowers and of the devil, which he envisioned had been chased away by a crucifix. His doctor, an atheist, visited the boy daily and thought the boy was a saint. The doctor was later converted to Catholicism. Santos died praying his favorite prayer "Thy will be done."

== Notes ==
- Ball, Ann. "Faces of Holiness: Modern Saints in Photos and Words", Our Sunday Visitor, 1998. ISBN 0-87973-950-9
