= 1968 in Spain =

- Decades: 1940s; 1950s; 1960s; 1970s; 1980s
- See also: Other events of 1968; List of years in Spain

Events in the year 1968 in Spain.

== Incumbents ==
- Caudillo: Francisco Franco

== Births ==
- 4 January – Jesús Clavería, futsal player
- 30 January – Felipe VI
- 22 March – Javier Castillejo, boxer

=== Full date unknown ===
- Lidó Rico, expressive artist

== Deaths ==
- 18 February – Juan de Landa, actor (b. 1894)
- 14 November – Ramón Menéndez Pidal, philologist and historian (b. 1869)

== See also ==
- 1968 in Spanish television
- List of Spanish films of 1968
