= 1968 in Spanish television =

This is a list of Spanish television related events from 1968.

== Events ==
- 16 February Historia de la frivolidad wins Golden Nymph Award at the Monte-Carlo Television Festival.
- 2 March Joan Manuel Serrat chosen to represent Spain in the Eurovision Song Contest. He was later discarded as he tried to sing in Catalan.
- 6 April - Spain wins the 13th Eurovision Song Contest in London, United Kingdom. The winning song is "La, la, la", performed by Massiel.

== Debuts ==
=== La 1 ===
- 30 años de historia
- Cristóbal Colón
- Detrás del telón
- Fábulas
- Pequeño estudio
- El Premio
- Ahora y siempre
- Actividades manuales
- Al filo del tiempo
- Ayer, hoy y mañana
- El ajedrez del amor
- Amigos del espacio
- Las artes
- Ayer, hoy y mañana
- Aventura juvenil
- Campamento de regatas
- La carretera es de todos
- Clan familiar
- Clarín
- Con acento
- Consulte a su médico
- Contamos contigo
- Cuentos y leyendas
- Deporte y escuela
- Discoteca joven
- Escuela TVE
- España en el mundo
- La España viva
- El estado de la cuestión
- Fauna
- Galas del sábado
- Gimnasia
- El héroe
- Hilo directo
- Hombres bajo el mar
- Los investigadores
- La quiniela
- Lo que va de siglo
- Manos al volante
- Un millón para el mejor
- Mundo curioso
- El mundo en la hora
- Museo del ingenio
- Musical 3
- Naturaleza y vida social
- Nivel de vida
- Noche del Sábado
- Noches de Europa
- Nosotros
- Nosotros inventamos
- Nuestro amigo el mago
- Nuestro mundo
- Ojos nuevos
- Por tierra, mar y aire
- Pueblos de España
- Puede ocurrirle a usted
- La quiniela
- Teatro infantil y juvenil
- Teatro de la lírica española
- Tele-Club
- La tortuga presurosa

=== La 2 ===
- Hora once
- Pablo y Virginia
- Ballet
- En busca de...
- Escritores en televisión
- Hacia México
- Medio siglo de imagen
- Nuevas gentes
- Último grito
- Voces de color

== Television shows ==
=== La 1 ===
- Telediario (1957- )
- Novela (1962-1979)
- Edición especial (1963-1969)
- Fin de semana (1963-1970)
- Panorama de actualidad (1963-1970)
- El Séneca (1974-1970)
- Historias para no dormir (1965-1970)
- Antena infantil (1965-1971)
- Ayer domingo (1965-1971)
- Estudio 1 (1965-1981)
- Día de fiesta (1966-1969)
- Misterios al descubierto (1966-1970)
- Cesta y puntos (1966-1970)
- The Chiripitiflauticos (1966-1976)
- Teatro breve (1966-1981)
- La casa de los Martínez (1967-1971)
- Club mediodía (1967-1972)
- Festival de la Canción Infantil de TVE (1967-1970)

=== La 2 ===
- Sospecha (1963-1971)
- Gama (1966-1970)
- Telecomedia de humor (1966-1971)
- Teatro de siempre (1966-1972)
- Luces en la noche (1966-1974)
- Torneo (1967-1979)

== Ending this year ==
=== La 1 ===
- Ésta es su vida (1962–1968)
- Noche del sábado (1965–1968)
- Un tema para el debate (1965–1968)
- Biblioteca juvenil (1966–1968)
- Jardilín (1966–1968)
- La pequeña comedia (1966–1968)
- Historias naturales (1967–1968)
- Protagonista: El hombre (1967–1968)
- Tribuna TV (1967–1968)
- Vamos a la mesa (1967–1968)

=== La 2 ===
- Luz verde (1966–1968)

== Foreign series debuts in Spain ==
English title	Spanish title	Channel	Country	Performers
Captain Scarlet and the Mysterons	El Capitán Escarlata	La 1	UK	
Danger Man	Cita con la muerte	La 2	USA	Patrick McGoohan
Flipper	Mi amigo Flipper	La 1	USA	Luke Halpin
Green Acres	Granjero último modelo	La 1	USA	Eddie Albert, Eva Gabor
I Dream of Jeannie	Mi bella genio	La 1	USA	Barbara Eden, Larry Hagman
Ironside	Ironside	La 1	USA	Raymond Burr
Man in a Suitcase	El hombre del maletín	La 1	USA	Richard Bradford
Mannix	Mannix	La 1	USA	Mike Connors
My Favorite Martian	Mi marciano favorito	La 2	USA	Ray Walston, Bill Bixby
Peter Gunn	Peter Gunn	La 1	USA	Craig Stevens
Petticoat Junction	El expreso a Petticoat	La 2	USA	Bea Benaderet
The Addams Family	La familia Addams	La 2	USA	Carolyn Jones
The Champions	Los invencibles del Némesis	La 1	UK	Stuart Damon
The Invaders	Los invasores	La 1	USA	Roy Thinnes
The Monkees	Los Monkees	La 1	USA	
The Prisoner	El prisionero	La 2	UK	Patrick McGoohan
The Road West	Conquistando el Oeste	La 1	USA	Barry Sullivan
The Wild Wild West	Jim West	La 1	USA	Robert Conrad

== Births ==
- 11 January - Alberto San Juan, actor.
- 17 January - Antonio Molero, actor.
- 20 January - Roberto Enríquez, actor.
- 24 January - Mónica Molina, actress.
- 28 January - Liborio García, presenter.
- 5 February - Daniel de la Cámara, humorist.
- 14 February - Alicia Borrachero, actress.
- 29 March - Esther Arroyo, actress and hostess.
- 13 March - Pepe Rodríguez, chef and presenter.
- 12 May - Jaime Bores, presenter.
- 20 March - Sonia Castelo, actress.
- 11 June - Josep Tomás, presenter.
- 18 June - Ana Duato, actress.
- 8 July - Miguel Puga, mago and presenter.
- 4 September - Yolanda Ramos, actress and hostess.
- 13 September - Santi Millán, actor.
- 4 October - Luis Miguel Seguí, actor.
- 21 October - Yolanda Ventura, actress.
- 5 November - Aitana Sánchez-Gijón, actress.
- 30 November Llum Barrera, actress and hostess.
- 9 December - Pedro García Aguado, presenter.
- 18 December - Juan Carlos Ortega, humorist.
- 23 December - Miquel Silvestre, journalist.
- Miguel Ángel Tobías, presenter.

== Deaths ==
- March 18 - José Luis Ozores, actor, 45

== See also ==
- 1968 in Spain
- List of Spanish films of 1968
