= Víctor Beltrí =

Spanish architect (1862–1935)

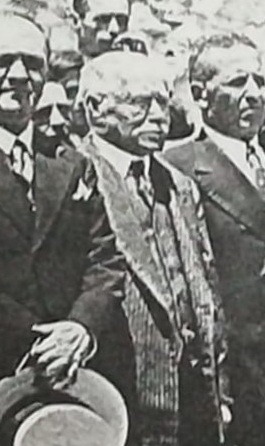
- Born: 16 April 1862; Tortosa
- Died: 4 February 1935; Cartagena
- Education: Escola Tècnica Superior d'Arquitectura de Barcelona

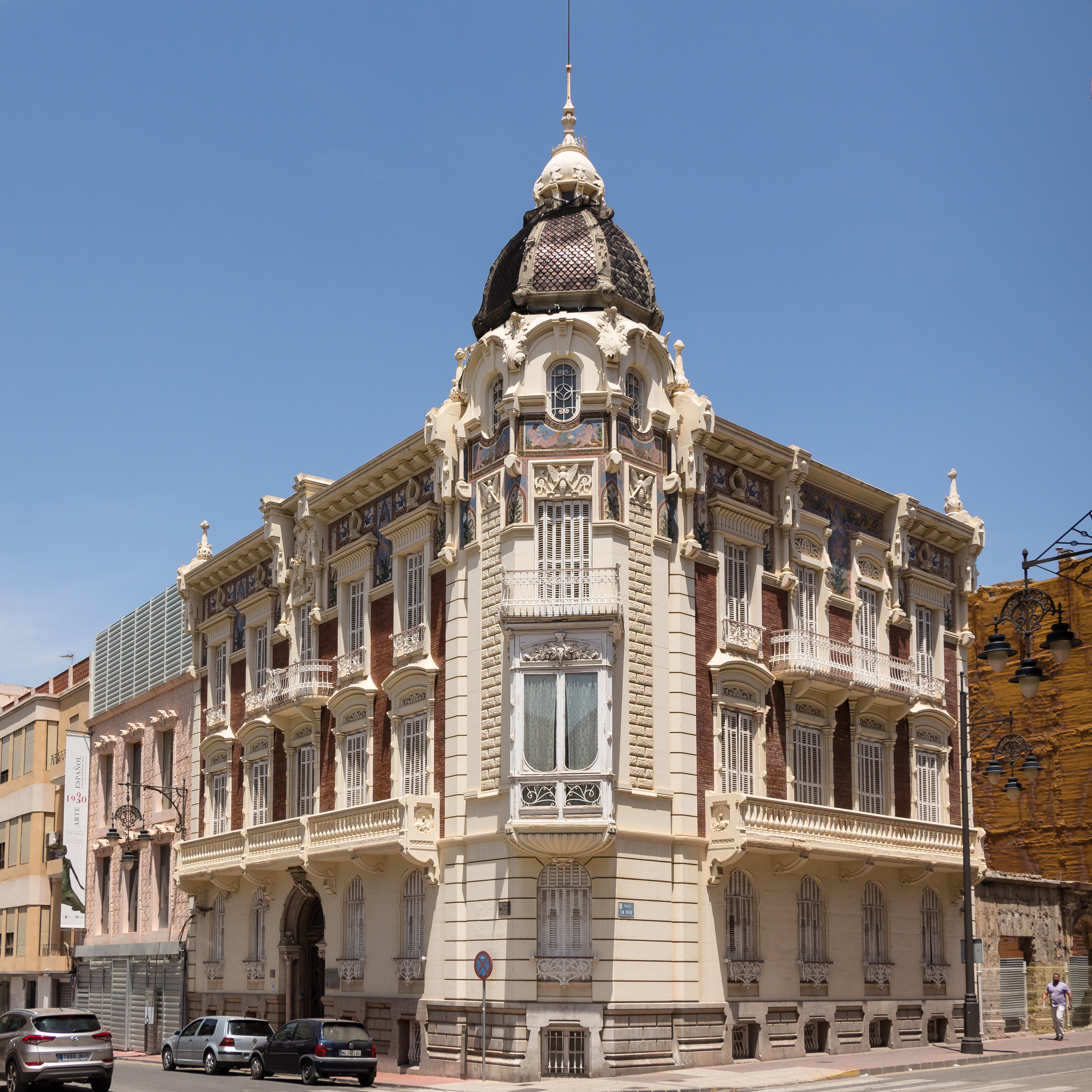
Palacio de Aguirre in Cartagena (1898).

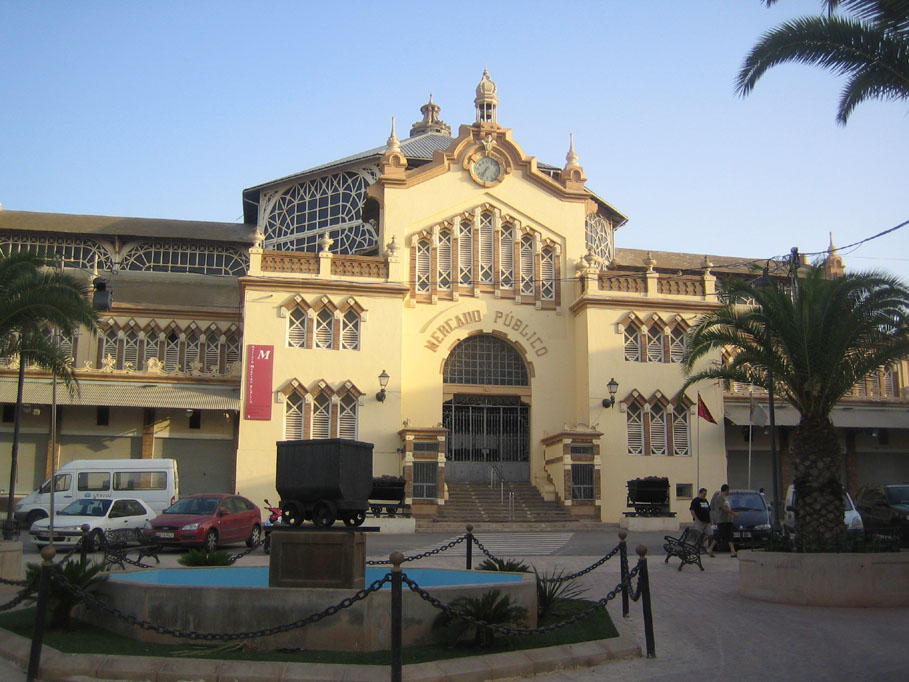
Mercado público de La Unión (1901)

Víctor Beltrí Roqueta was a Spanish architect primarily known for Art Nouveau buildings in Cartagena, Spain that made him into a prominent representative of Modernism in the region. He was born in Tortosa (Tarragona province) on 16 April 1862 and died on 4 February 1935 in Cartagena.

== Early life ==
Víctor Beltrí was born in Tortosa on April 16, 1862, the eldest of five children of a sculptor José María Beltrí Belilla (1829-1898) and Belilla Carmen Roqueta.

== Career ==
At 18 years old, he moved to Barcelona to study at the School of Architecture and the Official School of Fine Arts (now Escuela Técnica Superior de Arquitectura de Barcelona). While in Barcelona, Beltrí was also working to pay for his education. At the time (1880-1886), the first glimpses of the modernist movement were beginning to emerge. Among Beltr's teachers were the prominent Catalan Modernists: Elies Rogent, Lluis Domenech i Montaner, and Josep Vilaseca.

After graduation in architecture 1887 (Beltrí started his education as a painter), he returned to Tortosa, where he started to work as a professional architect for the municipality. In 1890, he moved to Gandía, where he grew as an artist. The last and longest period of his life was split between La Unión and Cartagena, where he designed many buildings, becoming the greatest Modernist architect in the Region of Murcia.

Beltrí arrived in Cartagena in 1893, when the city was being rebuilt after the Canton of Cartagena insurrection of 1873. The city at the time quickly expanding due to the wealth generated by the exploitation of lead and silver from the mines of Sierra Minera de Cartagena-La Unión.

Beltrí died in the city of Cartagena on February 4, 1935. and was buried in the same city on the next day. Many years later his remains were moved to the Cemetery of Nuestro Padre Jesús in Murcia.

== Works ==
Beltri started his professional work with renovating buildings in eclecticism style, but quickly switched to decorative modernism. While occasionally showing Gaudi-esque boldness, most of his designs, funded by Cartagena bourgeoisie, were not intense, reminding of Madrid, not Barcelona. Beltri was a prolific architect, with over 650 projects in Cartagena alone, some involving engineering and urban planning work.

Beltri stayed current with the fashionable artistic movements of his time. Since 1909, he incorporated elements of Wiener Moderne, from 1920 following also Art Deco, Regionalism, Catalan modernism and Rationalism. He is known for seamless integration of applied arts into architecture in the true Modernist spirit, using all the typical modernist materials, including iron, ceramics, and glass.

Many of Beltrí's works have been declared cultural treasures (Bien de Interés Cultural).

=== Works in Cartagena ===
Beltrí's first major work in Cartagena was the Casa Cervantes (1897-1900, currently the headquarters of Banco Sabadell). The building made him popular among the Cartagena bourgeoisie at the beginning of the 20th century and set the tone for current aesthetics of the historic center of Cartagena.

Major commissions in Cartagena included:

- Church at Barrio Peral (1896);
- Palacio de Aguirre (1898);
- Villa Calamari (1900), also known as the Mansion of Versailles;
- Casa Maestre (1906), inspired by Gaudí's Casa Calvet;
- Casas de los Catalanes (1907);
- Casa Dorda (1910);
- Casa Zapata (1910);
- Casa del Conde de Campillos in Santiago de la Ribera (1912);
- Gran Hotel de Cartagena (1912, no longer used as a hotel), the most representative work of modernism in the Region of Murcia. The six-story facade is made of artificial stone and red brick;
- Casa Llagostera (1915), its entire facade is decorated with allegorical painted ceramic tiles;
- Fundición Frigard (1918);
- Nursing Home of the Little Sisters of the Poor (1926);
- Casa de Misericordia (1929).

Multiple other works include: the reconstruction of the Cartagena Cathedral, the old Regatta Club (disputed), the remodeling of the Cartagena Casino.

=== Works in La Unión ===
- Mercado público de La Unión (1901). The "old" public market made of iron, stone and glass is one of the most significant works of modernism in Spain
- Casa del Tío Lobo, in Portmán (1913).

=== Works in Gandía ===
- Palacete París (1908).

== Legacy ==
In preparation for the 150th anniversary of the architect's birth (2012), the Beltrí 2012 Commission was formed in 2008 to preserve the cultural legacy of Beltrí. One of actions was Cartagena City Council renaming the Ronda Norte into Avenida de Víctor Beltrí.

== Gallery ==
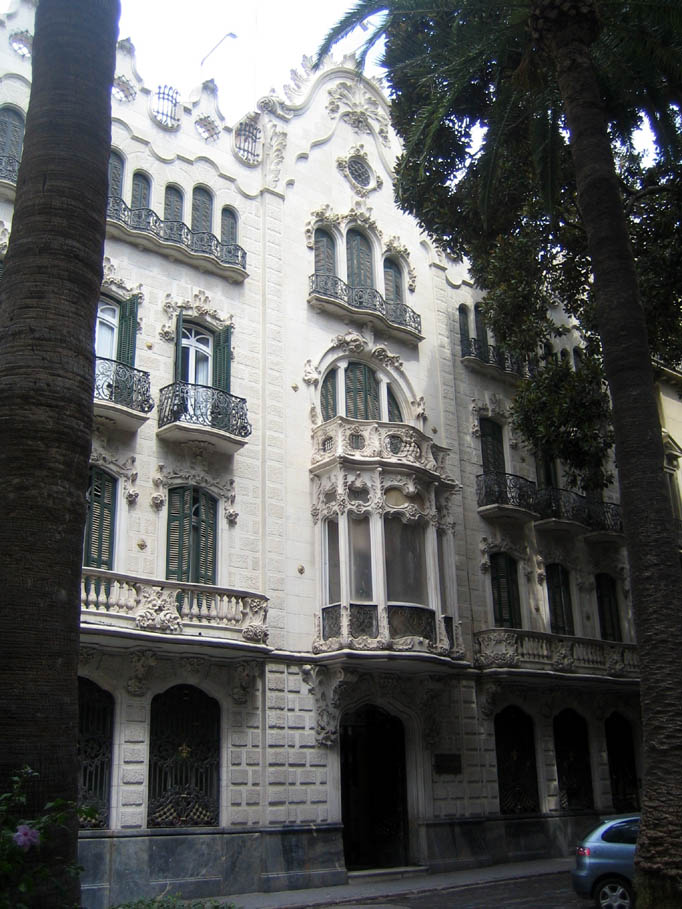
Casa Maestre in Cartagena.

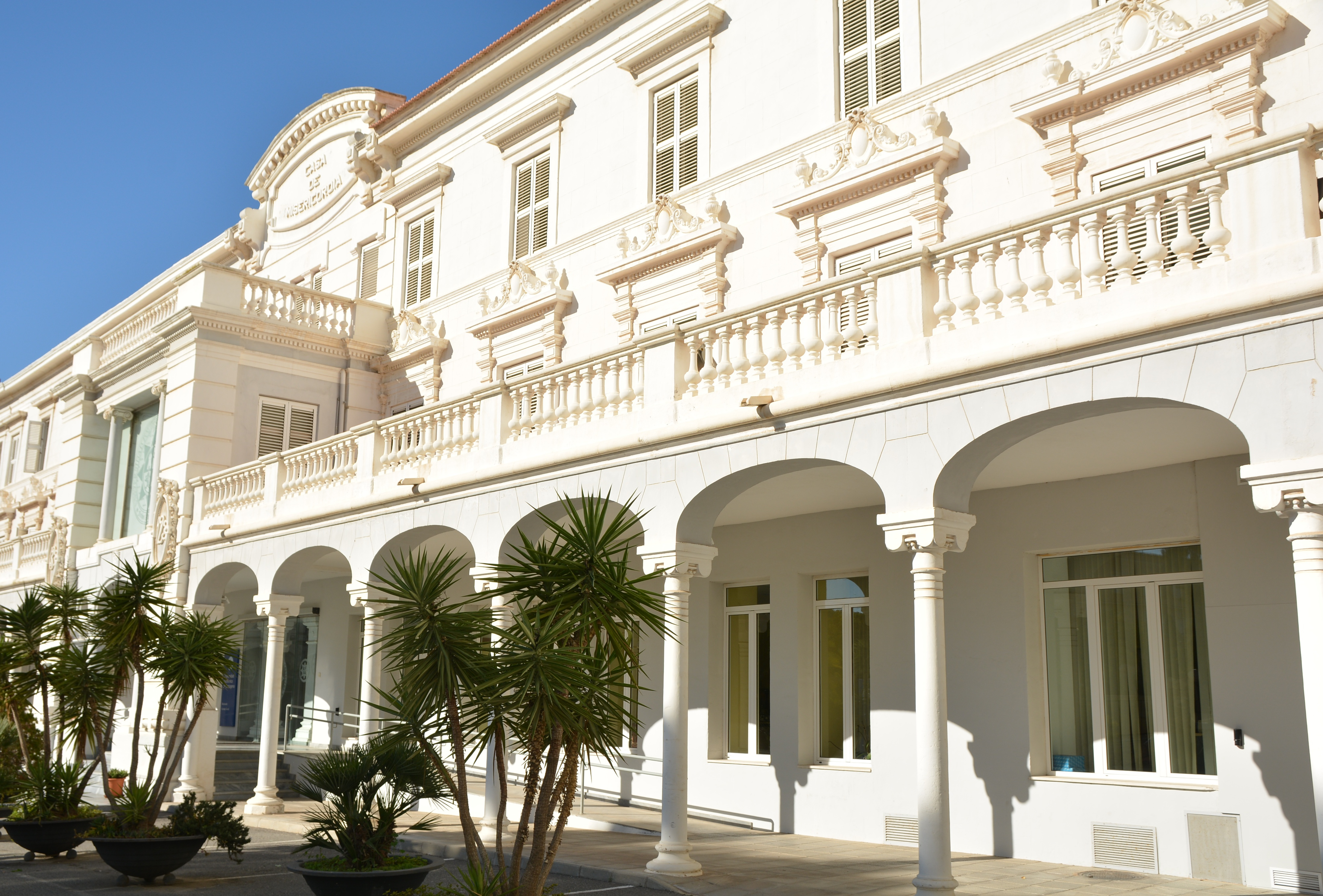
Casa de Misericordia in Cartagena.

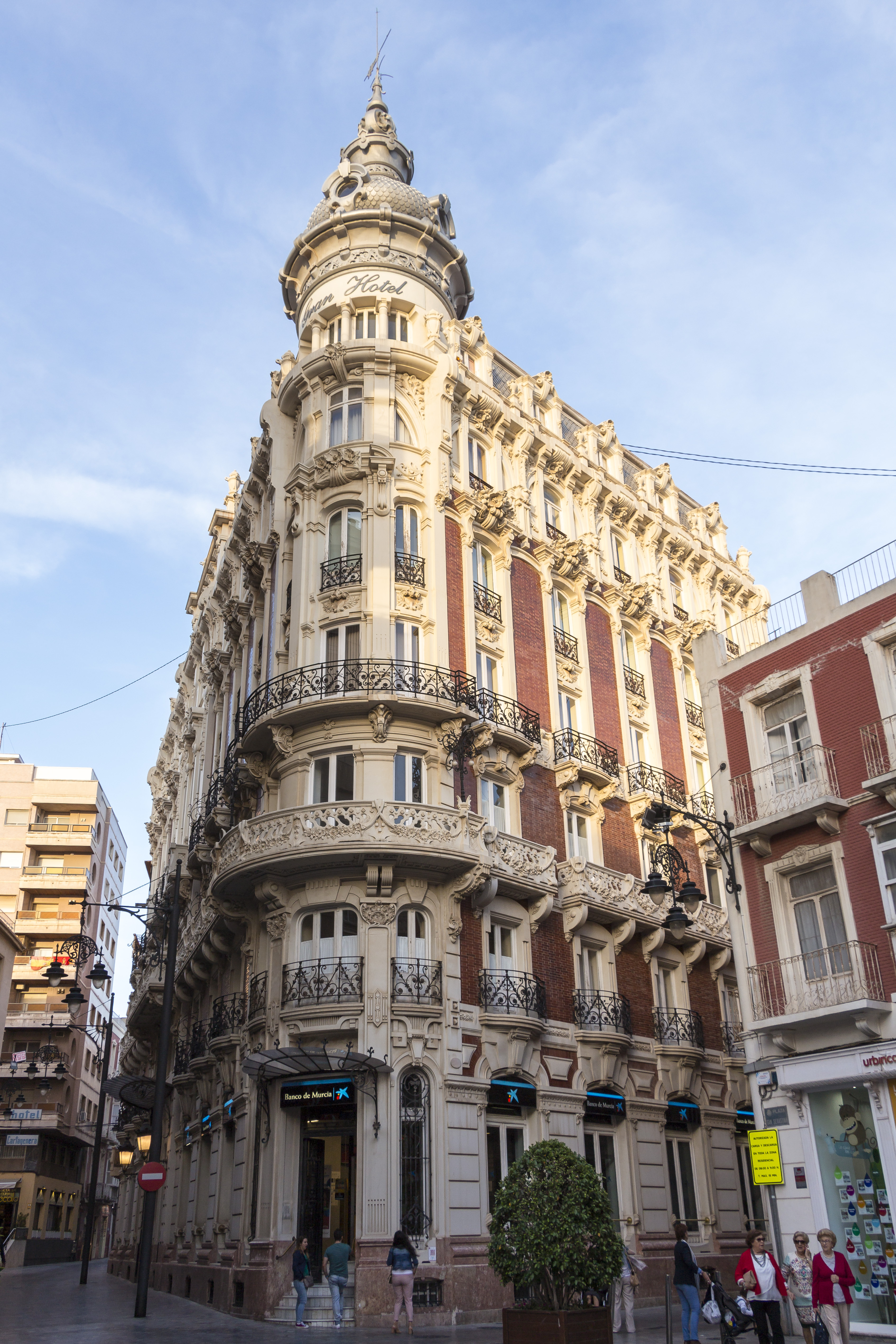
Gran hotel in Cartagena.

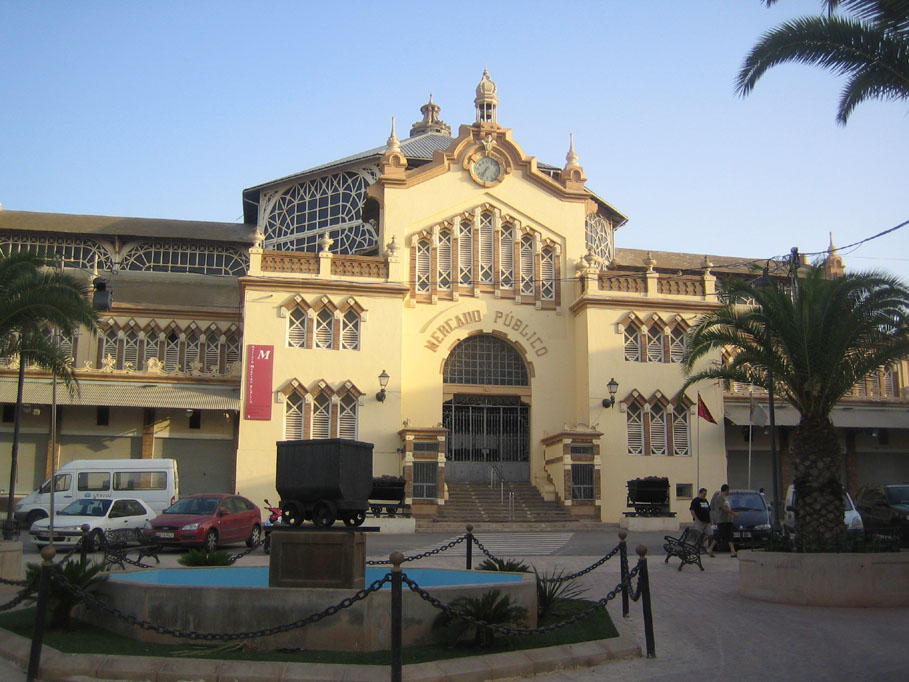
Mercado Público in La Unión.

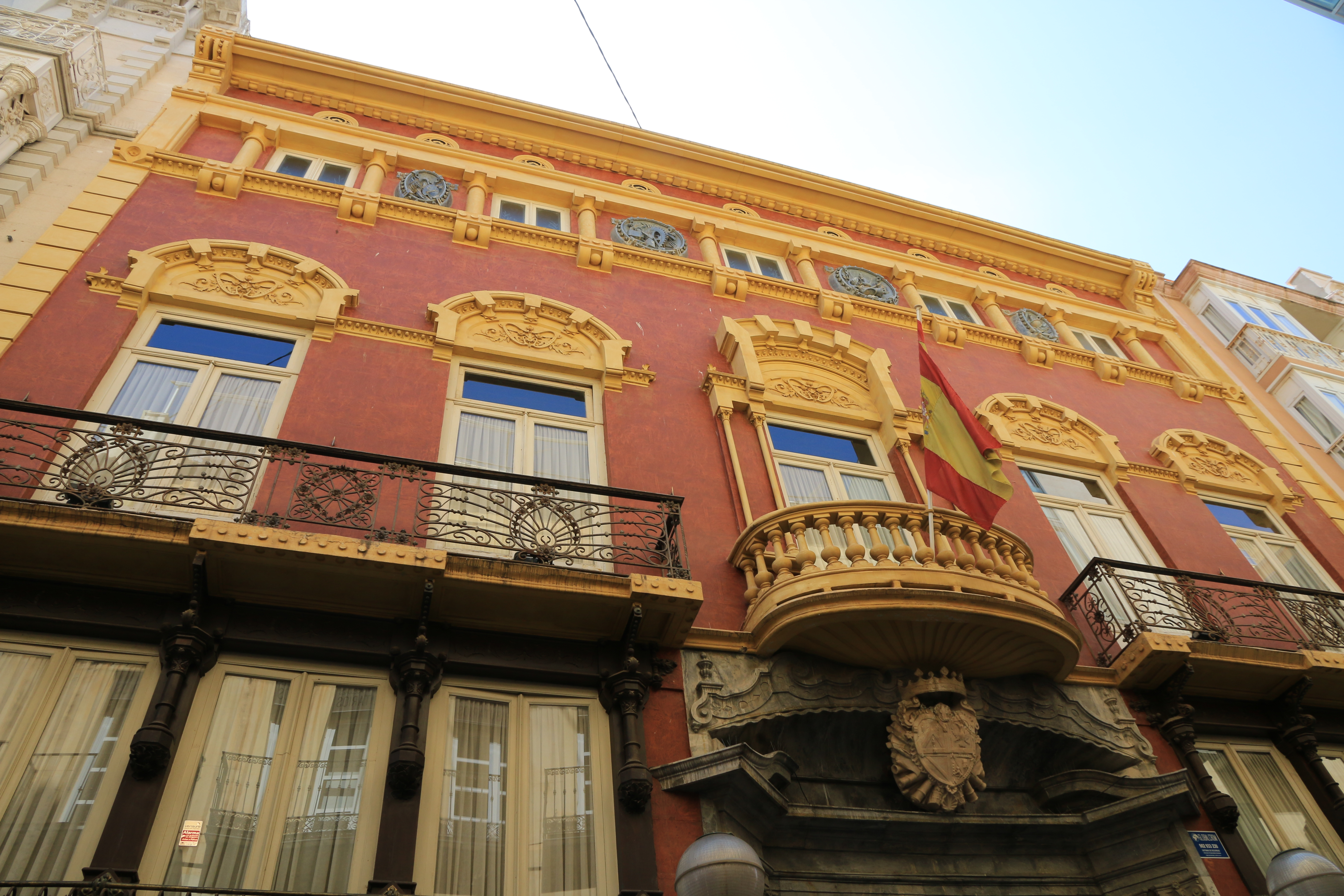
Casino de Cartagena.

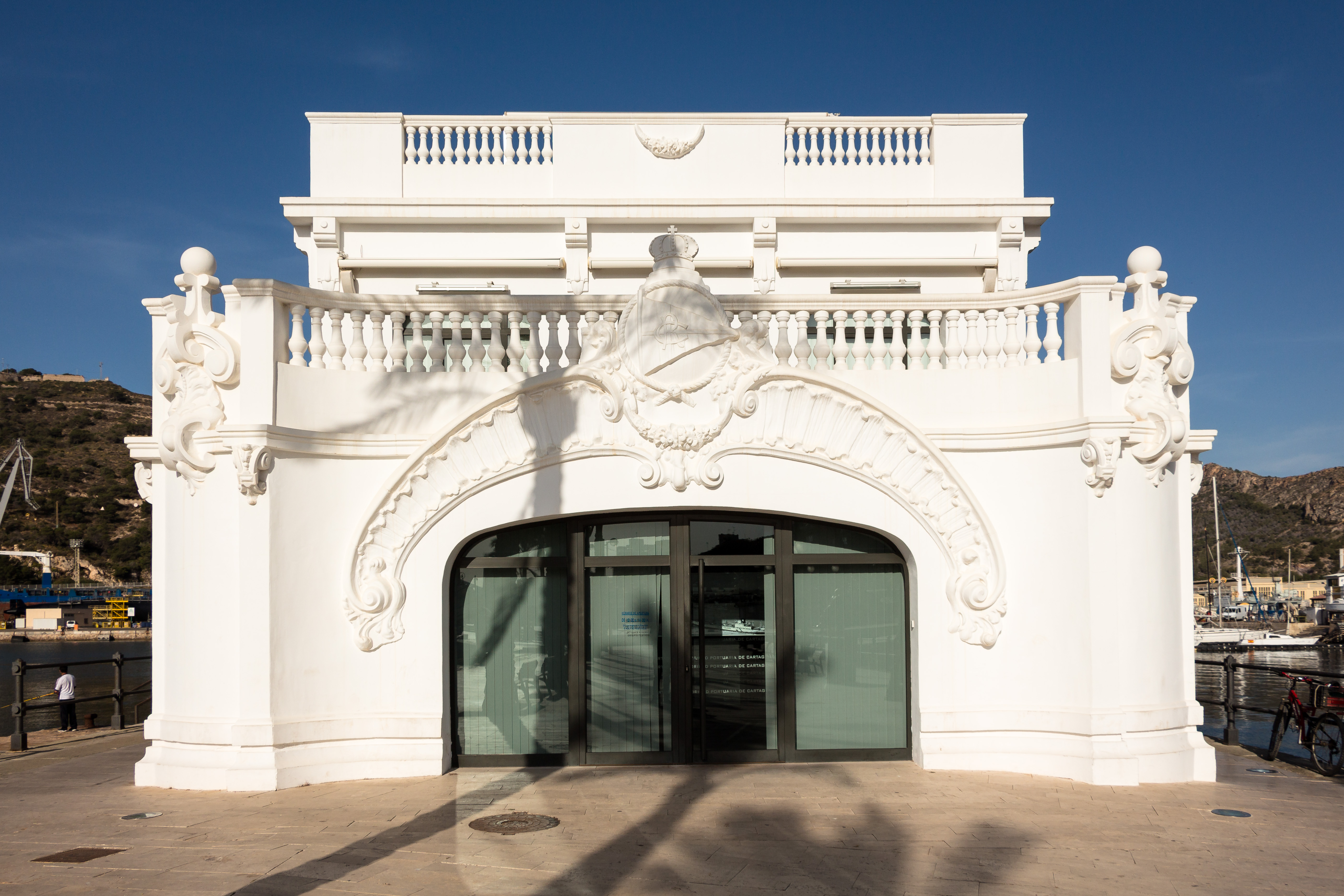
Antiguo Club de Regatas.

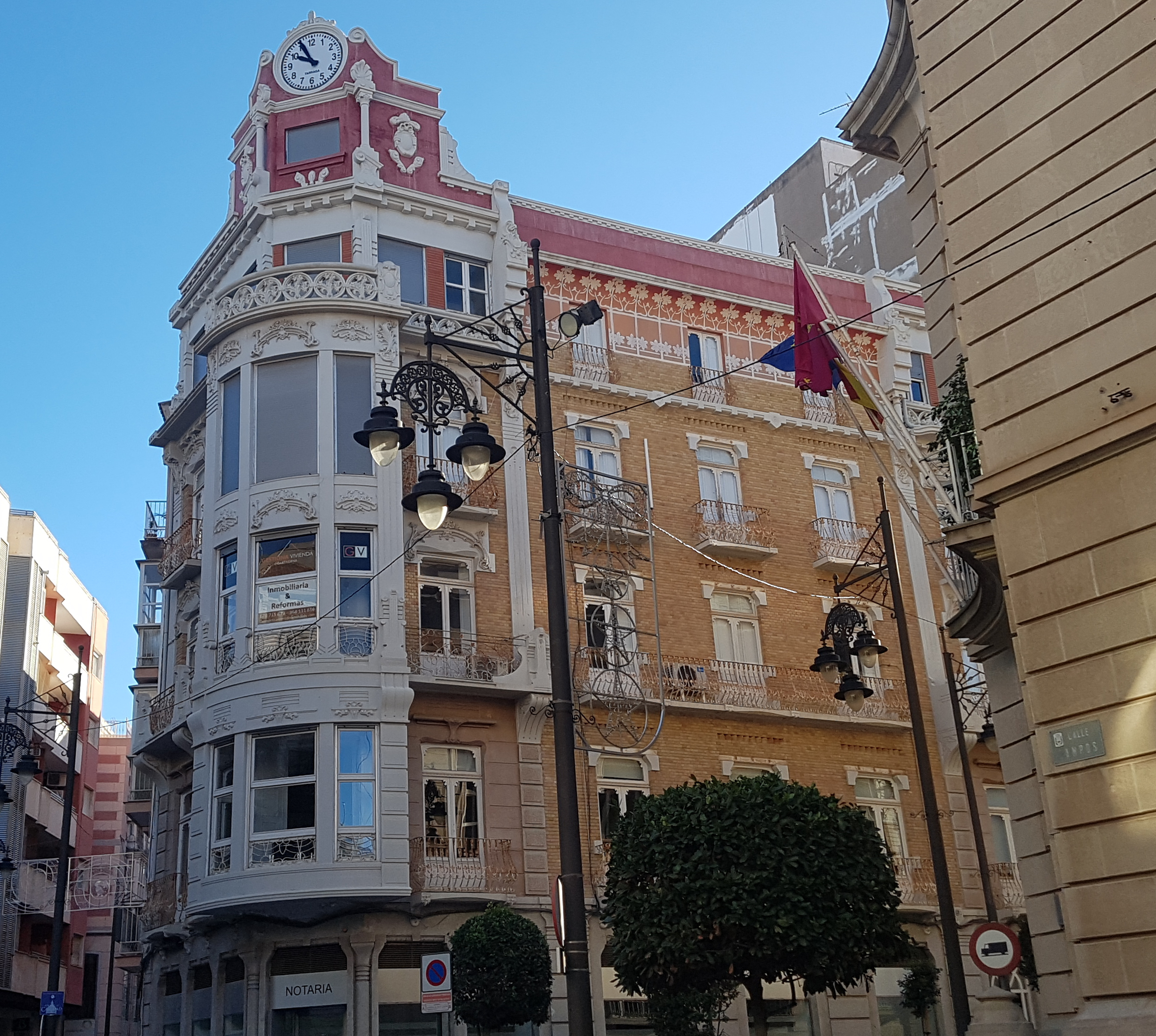
Casa Tárraga in Cartagena.

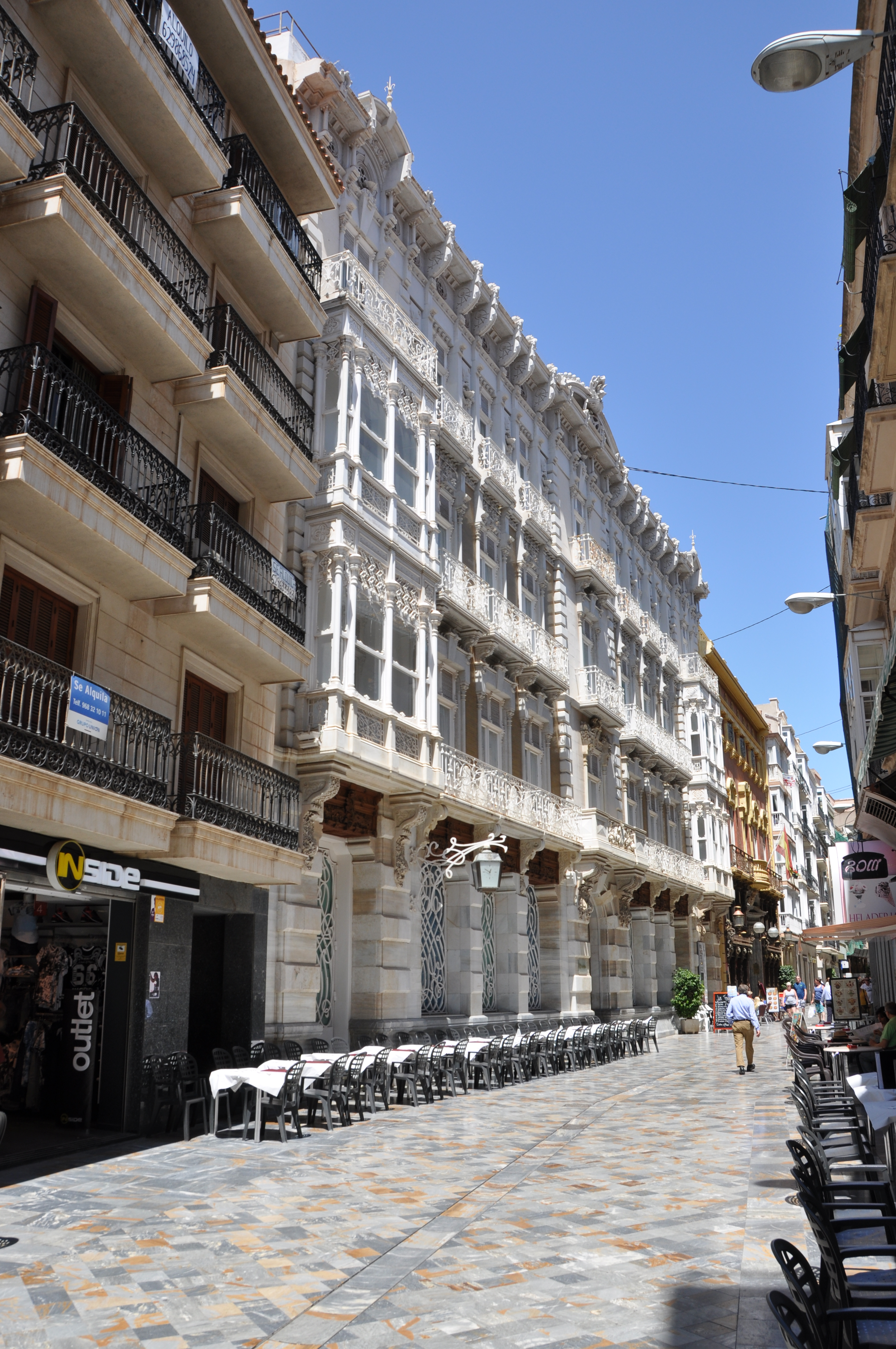
Casa Cervantes in Cartagena.

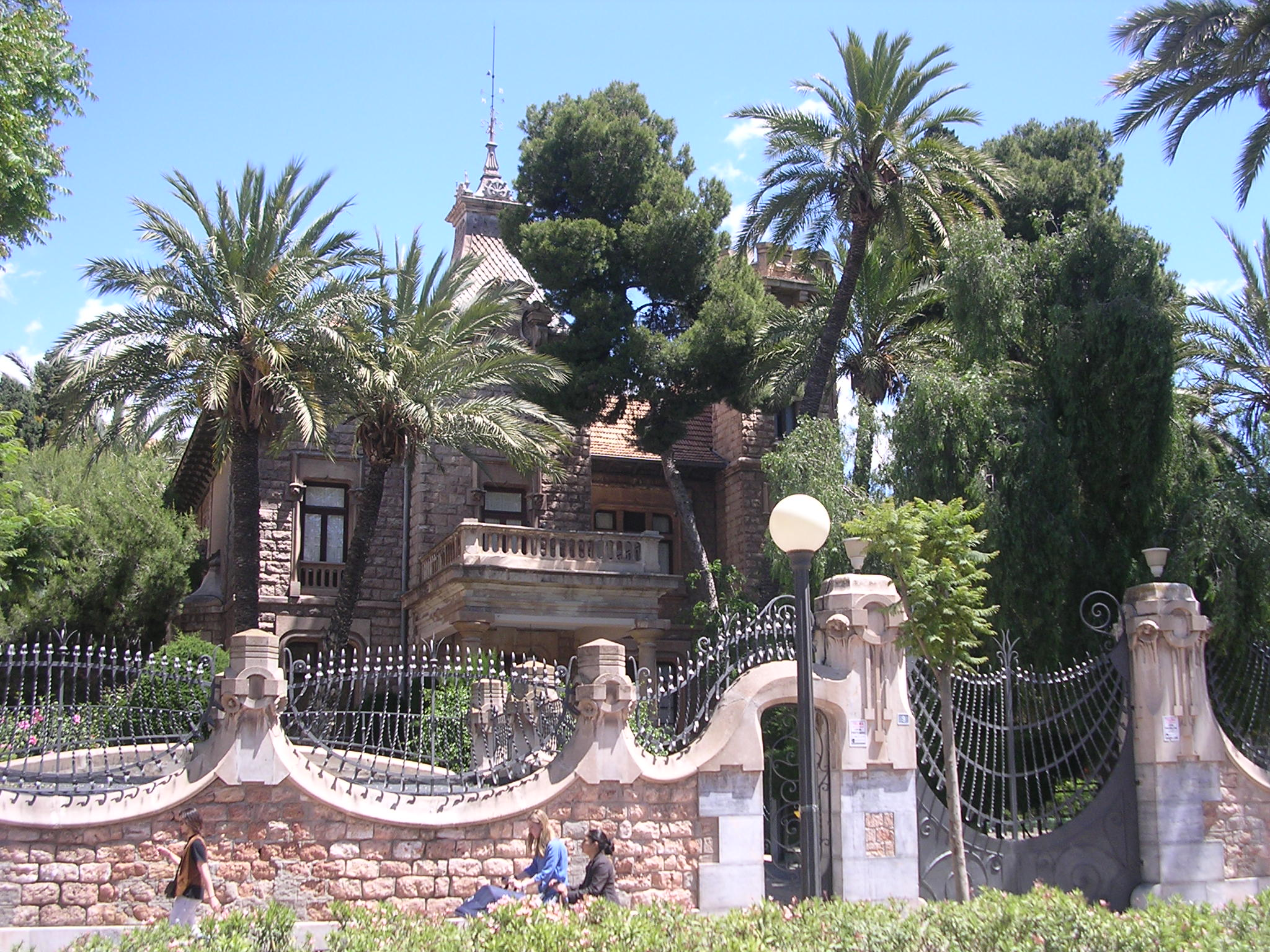
Casa Zapata

== Sources ==
- Cegarra Beltri, Guillermo; Morales Martínez, Santiago (2005). Adelante siempre: arquitecto, Víctor Beltrí y Roqueta (Tortosa 1862-Cartagena 1935) (in Spanish). Murcia: Colegio Oficial de Arquitectos de Murcia. ISBN 9788489882232.
- Lopez Martinez, Jose Francisco (9–11 November 2011). "Influencia nazari en la articulacion modernista del arquitecto Victor Beltri en Cartagena: Sobre la posibilidad de rehabilitacion de la espacialidad modernista" [Nasrid influence on the modernist articulation of architect Victor Beltri in Cartagena: On the possibility of rehabilitation of modernist spatiality]. XVIII Congreso Internacional Conservacion y Restauracion de Bienes Culturales [18th International Congress on Heritage Conservation] (in Spanish). Granada. pp. 759–762.
- Pérez Rojas, J. (1986). "Victor Beltri". Cartagena, 1874-1936 (transformación urbana y arquitectura). Arte (Editora Regional de Murcia) (in Spanish). Editora Regional de Murcia. pp. 416–453. ISBN 978-84-7564-038-9.
- Muñoz Fajardo, Ricardo. "Víctor Beltri Roquetas". Historia Hispanica. Royal Academy of History.
  From Historia Hispanica:
  - Consejería de Cultura, Educación y Turismo (1988). I. G. Jiménez Godoy (ed.). Murcia. Guía Artística (in Catalan). Murcia. ISBN 84-7564-068-0.
  - VV. AA., Un día alrededor de Murcia, Murcia, Comunidad Autónoma de la Región de Murcia, 1988
  - VV. AA., Cartagena, itinerarios culturales, Cartagena, Ayuntamiento, 1994
  - Urrutia Núñez, Angel (2003). Arquitectura española: siglo XX (in Spanish). Madrid: Catedra Ediciones. ISBN 978-84-376-1532-5.
