= Lidó Rico =

Spanish expressive artist

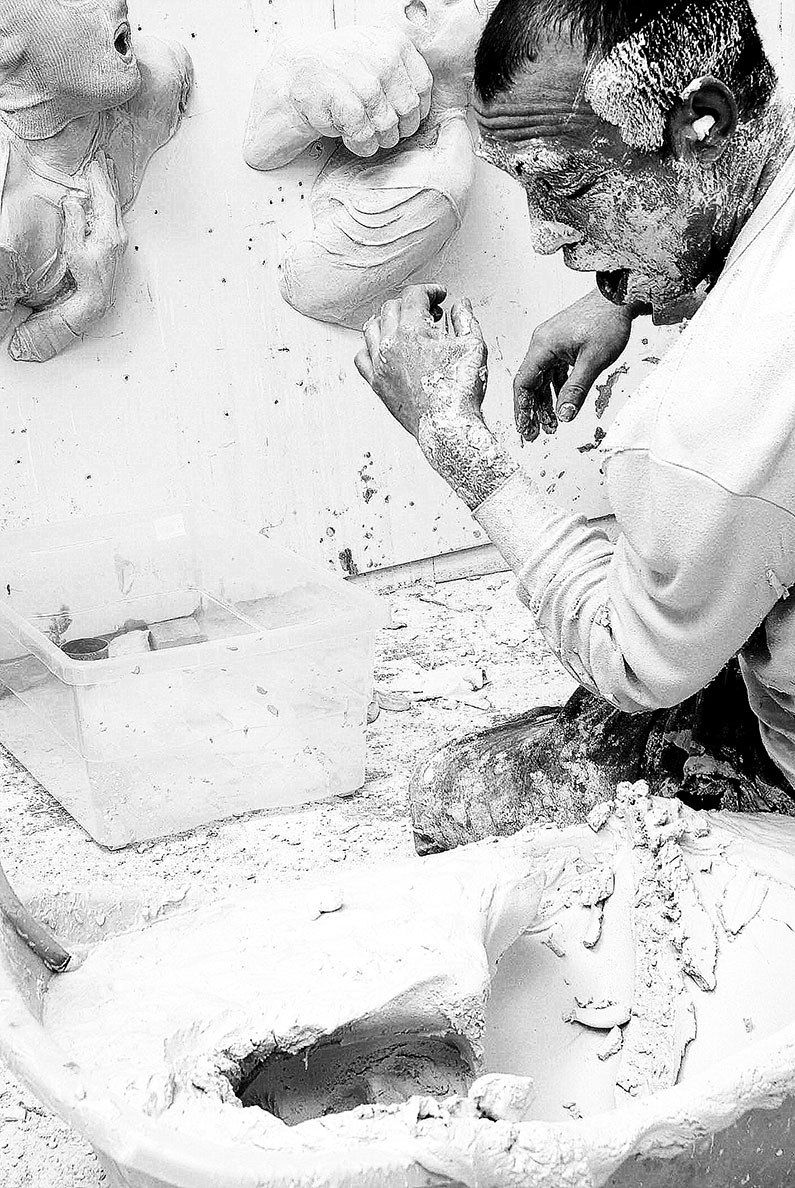
- Jose Ramón Lidó Rico
- Born: 1968 (age 57–58); Yecla
- Known for: Sculpture

Lidó Rico (born 1968) is a Spanish expressive artist.

== Early life ==
Rico was born in Yecla, Murcia. He began fine arts studies at San Carlos Polytechnic University of Valencia, graduating in 1991 at the École Superiere du Beaux Arts du Paris.

== Career ==
In 1989, he was awarded first Prize at the Murcia Young Painting Awards. In 1992 he was selected to make the outside sculpture at the Murcia Pavilion in Sevilla Universal Exhibition.

In 1997, his work was selected for the International Hall of Expressive Arts celebrated in Medellin, Colombia.

He received an Honorable Mention at VIth International Biennial of Drawing and Graphic Arts, Györ. Hungary.

In 2005, he was selected by the International Affairs Ministry to represent Spain at the XXIIIrd Biennial of Alexandria in Egypt, where he was awarded the Grand Prize.

He has appeared in more than one hundred exhibitions. His work is exhibited at the Museo Nacional Centro de Arte Reina Sofía, at diverse institutions including the Spanish Bank Madrid Collection and in many other public and private collections.

== Work ==
Rico's work is characterized by using his body as a working tool. His.expressive universe includes images that tell histories, He employs unconventional techniques and atypical materials.

== Exhibitions ==
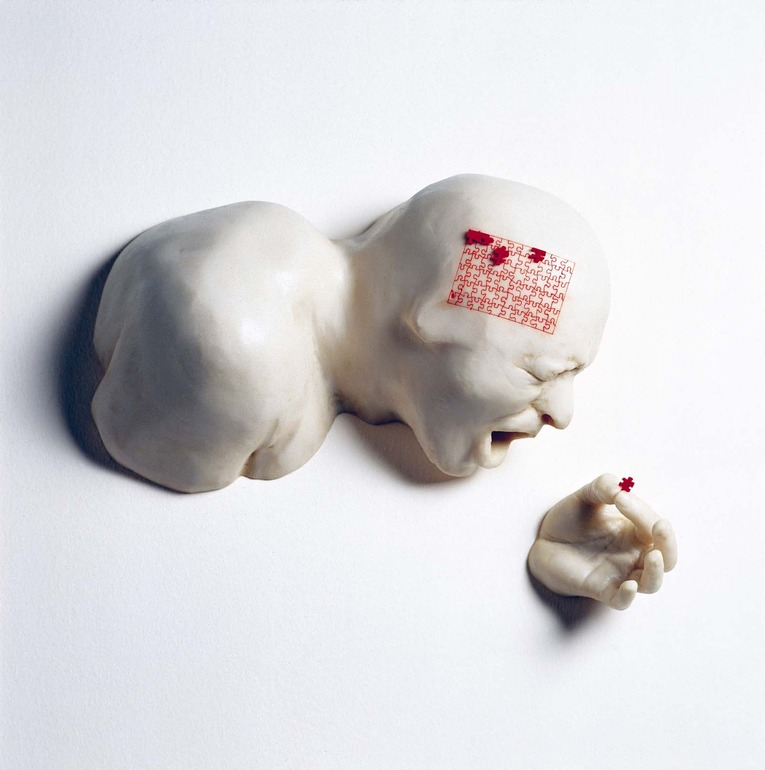
Diecinuevemil Seiscientos

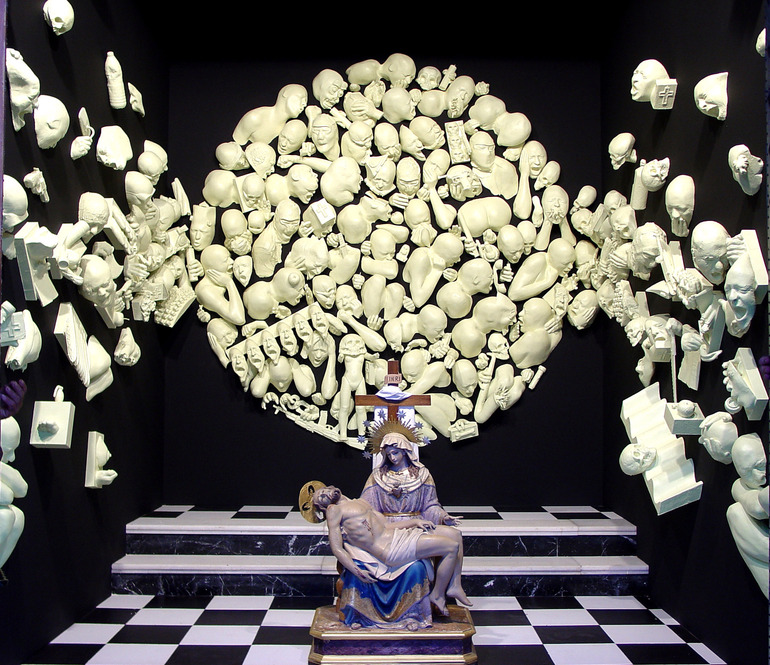
Diecinuevemil Seiscientos

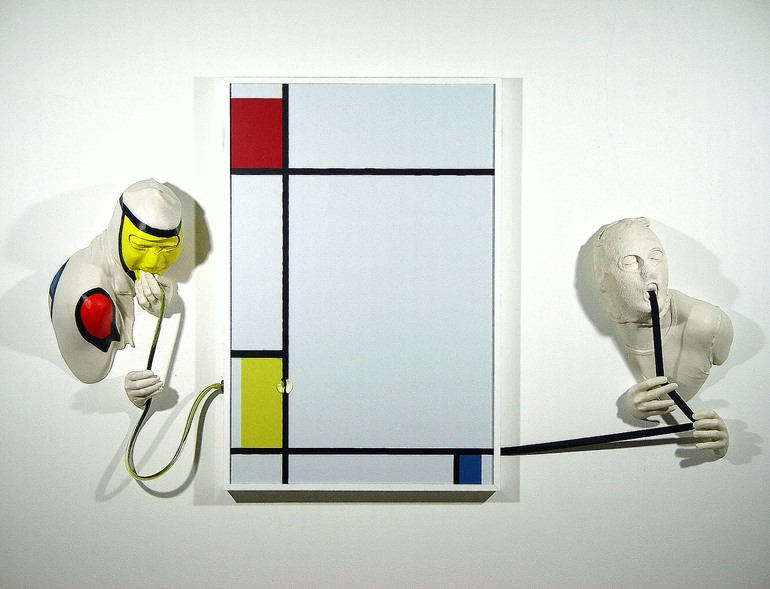
Diecinuevemil Seiscientos

- Lidó Rico. The Revelation, 2026, Art Museum Riga Bourse, Riga, Latvia
- Global Warming, 2012, Galeria Fernando Latorre. Madrid.
- Curso Legal, 2011, Museo Barjola. Gijón.
- Curso Legal, 2010, Fundación José García Jiménez. Murcia
- Ex-Cultura, 2010, Museo de Bellas Artes . Murcia.
- Cobertura de Ánimas, 2010, OFF PAC. Fundación José García Jiménez. Murcia.
- Flags, 2010, Galeria Fernando Latorre. Madrid.
- Noctilucos, 2008, Espai Quatre. Palma de Mallorca.
- Anónimos, 2007, Galeria Artnueve. Murcia.
- Exvotorio, 2007, Peregrinatio. Ermita de los Dolores. Sagunto.Valencia.
- Glups, 2006, Galeria Fernando Latorre. Madrid.
- La mirada plural, 2006, Real Academia de España. Roma.(Italia).
- Secadero de Pensamientos, 2006, Palacio de San Esteban. Murcia.
- Glup de Aéreos, 2006, Sala Robayera. Ayuntamiento de Miengo, Cantabria.
- Reds, 2005, Galeria Mixed Media. Shizuoca. (Japón).
- Reds, 2005, Galeria Christopher Cutts. Toronto. (Canadá).
- Pensavientos, 2005, Museo de Arte Moderno de Alejandría.(Egipto).
- Explorer 515–516, 2004, Galeria Fernando Latorre. Madrid.
- Locutorios, 2004, Sala de exposiciones Consistorio de San Marcelo. León.
- Locutorios, 2004, Galeria Fernando Silió. Santander.
- Envirospheres, 2004, Galeria Mssohkan. Kobe (Japón).
- Ambiências, 2003, Galeria Minimal Arte Contemporánea. Oporto (Portugal).
- Apegos, 2003, Galeria Maria llanos. Cáceres.
- Provisionario, 2003, Horno de la ciudadela. Pamplona.
- Revisôes, 2002, Galeria Minimal Arte Contemporánea. Oporto (Portugal).
- Sumergidos, 2002, Museo de la Universidad de Alicante.
- Con-texto, 2002, Galeria Fernando Latorre. Zaragoza.
- No Lugares, 2002, Fundación La Caixa. Tarragona.
- Atmosferas, 2002, Palacio Aguirre. Cartagena.
- Fillites, 2002, Galeria Vértice. Oviedo.
- Vertidos, 2001, Galería Tráfico de Arte. León.
- Vertidos, 2001, VI International Biennial of Drawing and Graphic Arts, Györ. Hungría.
- Tampoco es seguro el sueño, 2000, Galería Magda Bellotti. Algeciras.
- Tránsito, 1999, Stand Galería Espacio Mínimo. Toledo.
- The showerfighters, 1999, Palacio Almudí. Murcia.
- Retornos, 1999, Galería Caracol. Valladolid.
- Campo de Batalla, 1998, Palacio de Abrantes. Universidad de Salamanca.
- Fisionomías, 1997, Galería Palma Dotze. Villafranca del Penedés (Barcelona).
- Fisionomías, 1997, Salón Internacional de Artes Plásticas. Bienal Internacional. Medellín (Colombia).
- Vampirium Spectrum, 1997, Galería Espacio Mínimo. Murcia.
- Vampirium Spectrum, 1996, Cohen/Berkowitz Gallery, Kansas City (USA).
- Optical Dreams, 1996, Galería Tabea Lamgenkamp. Düsseldorf (Alemania).
- Mutilations, 1996, Sala Carlos III. Universidad Pública de Pamplona.
- Reluctantes, 1996, Galería Espacio Mínimo. Murcia.
- Escisiones Circulares, 1996, Galería DV. San Sebastián.
- Sèmeur éternel, 1995, Galería Espacio Mínimo. Murcia.
- Sur un Destin, 1995, Galería Ferrán Cano. Palma de Mallorca.
- Fragmentos, 1995, Galería Ad Hoc. Vigo (Pontevedra).
- Revisiones y Mutaciones, 1995, Galería Ferrán Cano. Barcelona.
- Transitos, 1994, Galería Delpasaje. Valladolid.
- Parafine Aeralist, 1994, Galería Emilio Navarro. Madrid
- Luminarias, 1993, Galería Mácula. Alicante.
- Rotación Inestable, 1993, Galería Fúcares. Almagro (Ciudad Real).
- Parmi Nous, 1992, Club Diario Levante. Valencia.
- Silencio Nepal, 1992, Galería Espacio Mínimo. Murcia.
- Del Lenguaje de Las Piedras, 1991, Galería Rita García. Valencia.
- Où ten test acier, 1991, Galerie Hensel & Reifferscheidt. Colonia (Alemania).
- Ignorés, 1991, Galeria Espace Flon. Lausanne (Suiza).
- 1989, Spazio Viola. Brecia (Italia).

== Links ==
- Galeria Fernando Latorre .
- Geifco.
- Biblioteca virtual Miguel de Cervantes.
- Mssohkan Gallery.
- Artfacts.
- Galeria Sicart .
- Artium .
- 25 años de Muestra de Arte Injuve .
- Galeria Vértice .
- Galeria Juan Silió.
- Masdearte.
- Arteinformado.
- Artium Catálogo .
- author's website.
