= Palacio de Aguirre =

Coordinates: 37°36′11″N 0°58′51″W

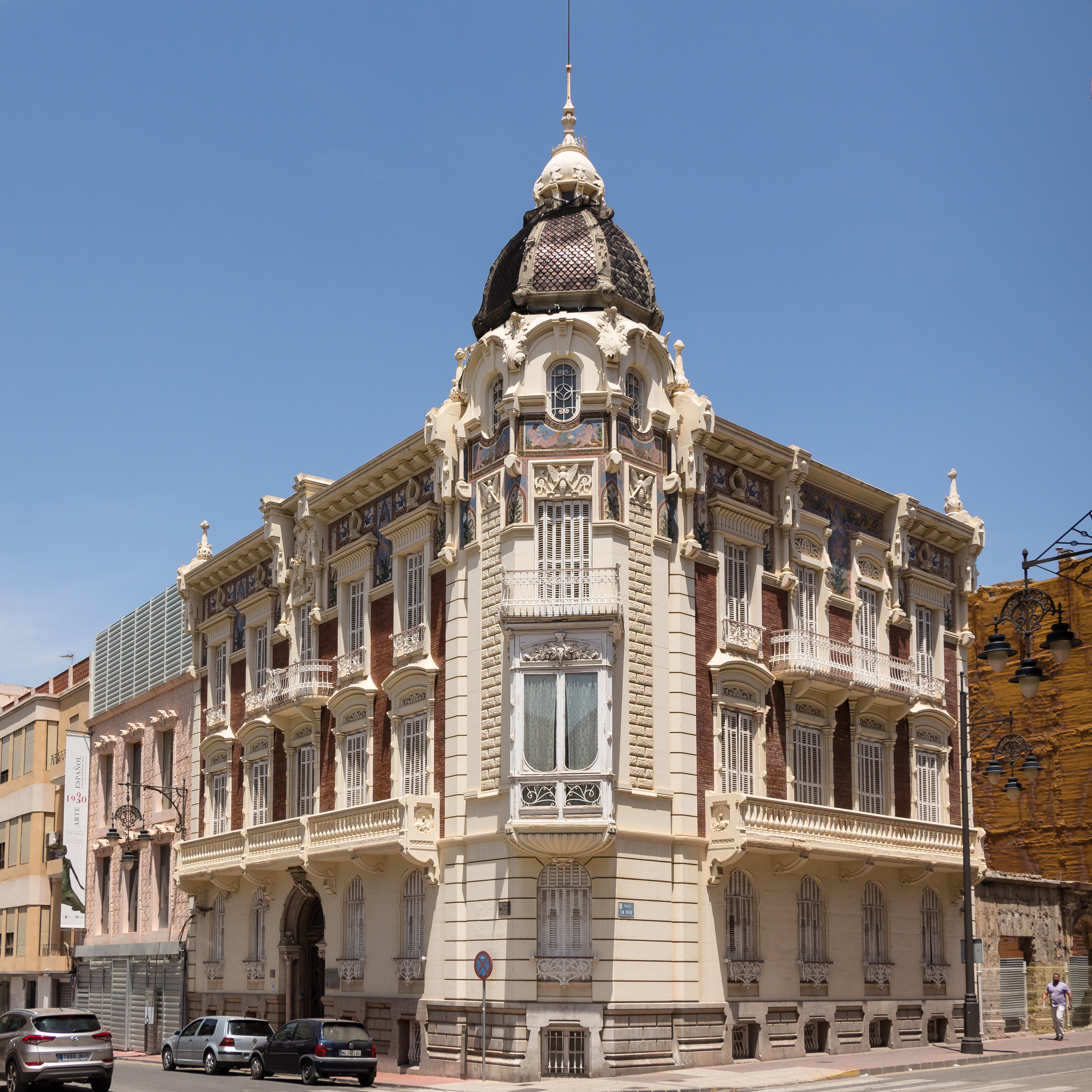
- Interactive map of the Palacio de Aguirre area

General information
- Architectural style: Modernism
- Location: Cartagena, Spain
- Groundbreaking: 1898
- Completed: 1901

Design and construction
- Architect: Victor Beltri

The Palacio de Aguirre in Cartagena, Spain, is a modernist building designed by architect Víctor Beltrí. After Beltri's successful completion of the Casa Cervantes, mining entrepreneur Camilo Aguirre had commissioned the architect in 1898 to construct this palace, completed in 1901.

Currently, it serves as the headquarters of the Region of Murcia in Cartagena and is also a part of the MURAM (Regional Museum of Modern Art), inaugurated in 2009.

== Facade ==
Notable features of the facade include ceramic decorations of angels at the top, a bay window in Cartagena's tradition, sculptural decorations of bees (a popular modernist symbol representing prosperity obtained through work), and the ceramic dome.

== Interior ==
Some elements of the original interior are preserved:

- The ballroom, featuring neo-rococo decor and ceiling paintings by Cecilio Pla depicting an allegory of spring.
- The office overlooking the bay window.
- The vestibule.
- The imperial staircase.
- The neo-Gothic style oratory.

== Gallery ==
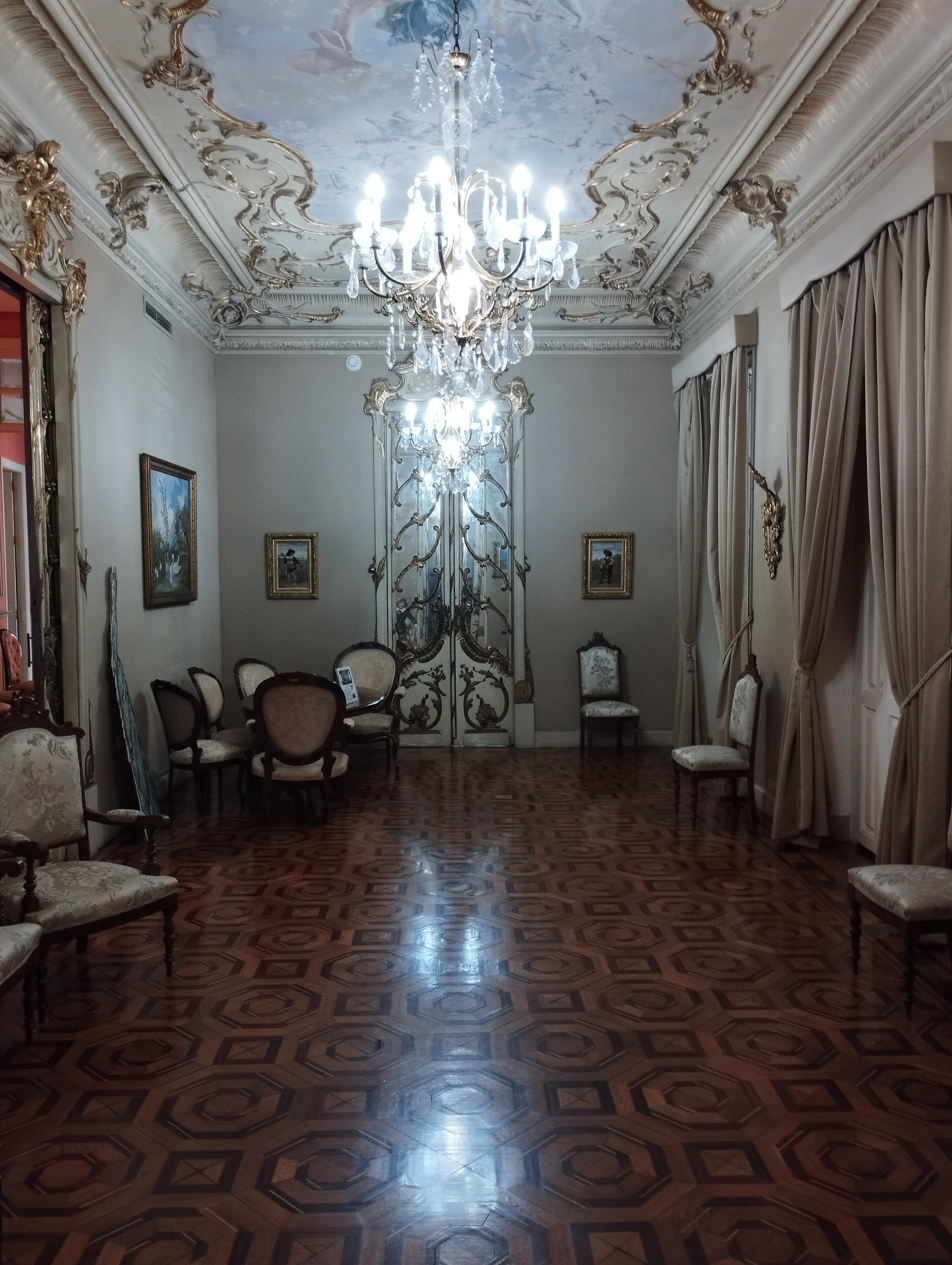
The ballroom

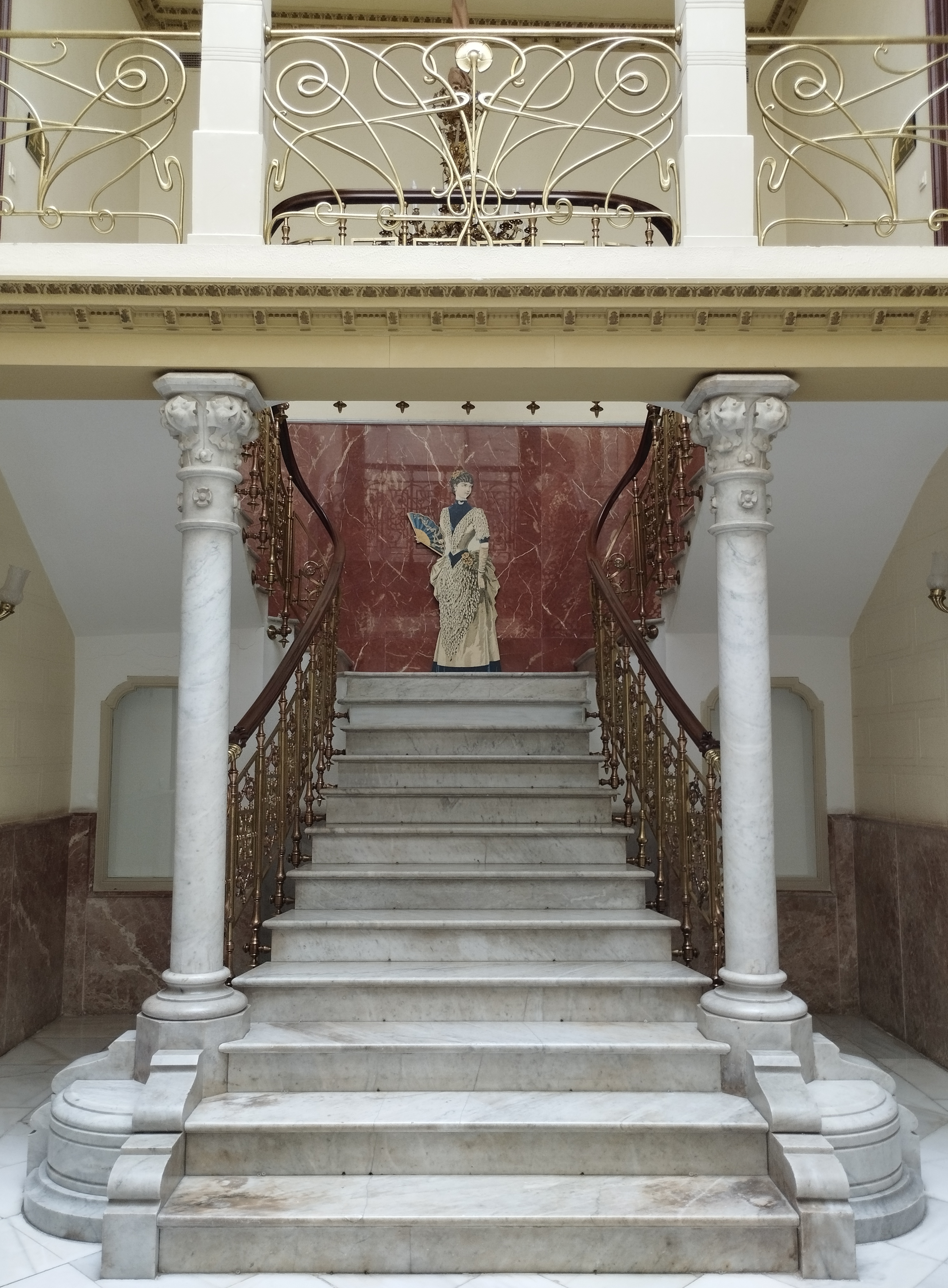
The main staircase

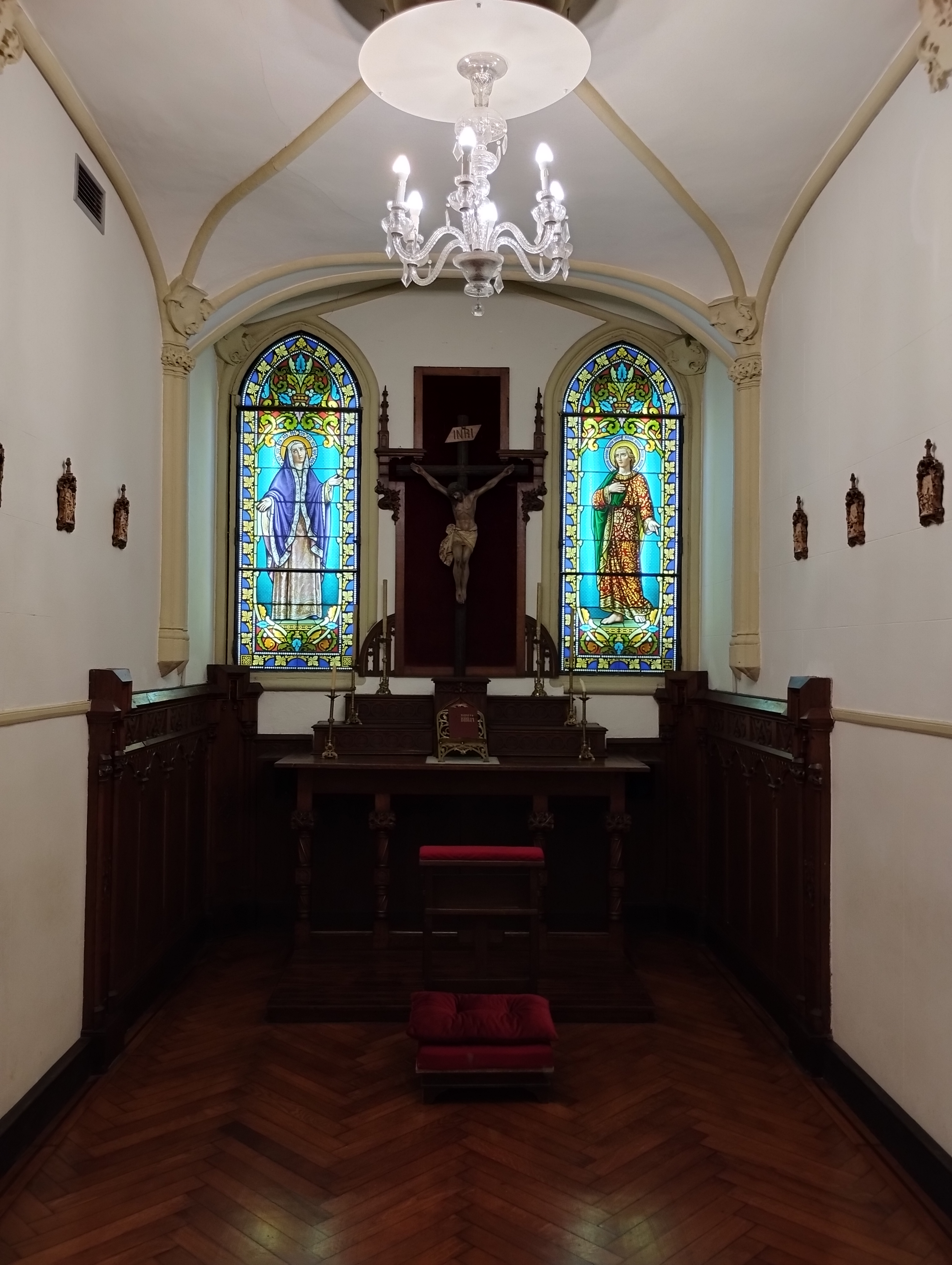
The oratory

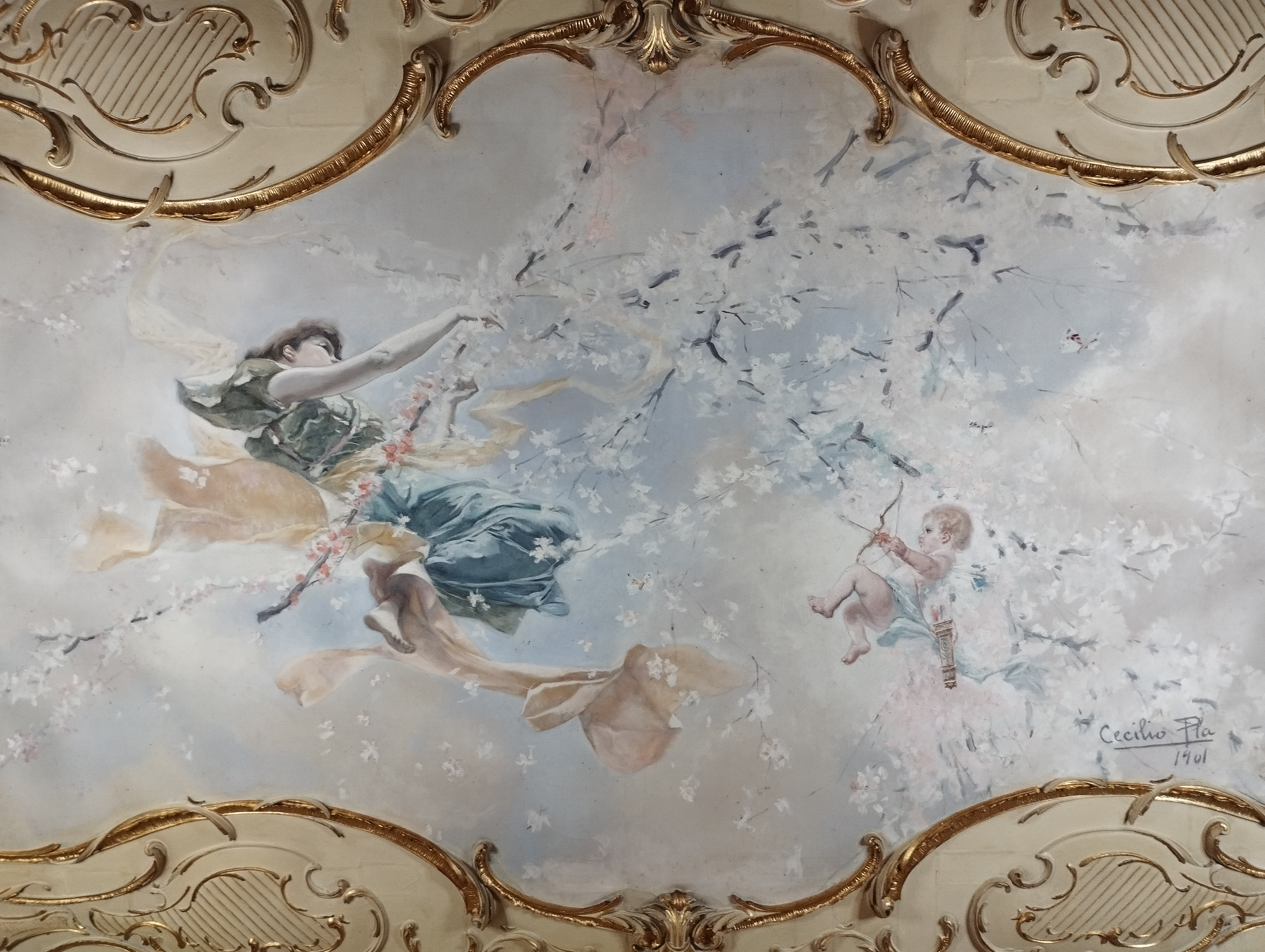
Allegory of Spring, a work by Cecilio Pla on the ceiling of the ballroom

== Sources ==
- Rojas, J.P. (1986). "Palacio Aguirre". Cartagena, 1874-1936 (transformación urbana y arquitectura). Arte (Editora Regional de Murcia) (in Spanish). Editora Regional de Murcia. pp. 420–422. ISBN 978-84-7564-038-9.
- "Palacio Aguirre". Región de Murcia Digital.
