= Jesús Clavería =

Spanish futsal player

Personal information
- Full name: Jesús Clavería Domínguez
- Date of birth: 4 January 1968 (age 58)
- Place of birth: Baracaldo, Spain
- Position: Goalkeeper

Senior career*
Years	Team	Apps	(Gls)
1986–2005	Interviú		

International career
1992–2002	Spain		
- * Club domestic league appearances and goals

Jesús Clavería Domínguez (born 4 January 1968) is a Spanish former futsal player, best known for his spell with Inter Movistar as a goalkeeper.

== Honours ==
=== Spain ===
- 2000 FIFA Futsal World Championship champion
- 1996 FIFA Futsal World Championship Second place
- 1992 FIFA Futsal World Championship Third place
- 1996 UEFA Futsal Championship, 2001 UEFA Futsal Championship champion
- 1999 UEFA Futsal Championship Second place

=== Interviú ===
- 1991 Futsal European Clubs Championship
- 2003-04 UEFA Futsal Cup
- Intercontinental Futsal Cup 2005
- Spanish League 1988/89, 1989/90, 1990/91, 1995/96, 2001/02, 2002/03, 2003/04
- Spanish Cup 1987, 1990, 1996, 2001, 2004
- Spanish Super Cup 1991, 1992, 1997, 2002, 2003, 2004
