= Stuart Dimond =

English footballer

Personal information
- Date of birth: 3 January 1920
- Place of birth: Chorlton-cum-Hardy, England
- Date of death: 2004 (aged 83–84)
- Position: Centre forward

Senior career*
Years	Team	Apps	(Gls)
	Manchester United	0	(0)
1945–1947	Bradford City	9	(1)
1947–1948	Mossley		
- Winsford United
- Ashton United
- Northwich Victoria
- Hyde United
1958–1959	Mossley		
1964–1965	Ashton United		

Managerial career
- Buxton
- Winsford United
- 1964–1965: Ashton United
- * Club domestic league appearances and goals

Stuart Dimond (3 January 1920 – 2004) was an English professional football player and coach who played as a centre forward.

== Career ==
Born in Chorlton-cum-Hardy, Dimond played for Manchester United and Bradford City. For Bradford City he made 9 appearances in the Football League, scoring 1 goal.

He later played in non-league for Mossley, Winsford United, Ashton United, Northwich Victoria, Hyde United, before returning to Mossley. He is the record goalscorer at Ashton United, with 201 goals in 251 games. He had two spells with Mossley.

He was later manager of Buxton and Winsford United. He also managed Ashton United in the 1964–65 season, playing and scoring for the club during that time, and becoming the club's oldest player and goalscorer.

== Sources ==
- Frost, Terry (1988). Bradford City A Complete Record 1903-1988. Breedon Books Sport. ISBN 0-907969-38-0.
