= Church of Santa María de Gracia, Cartagena =

Coordinates: 37.6010°N 0.9856°W

Our Lady of Grace
- Santa María de Gracia
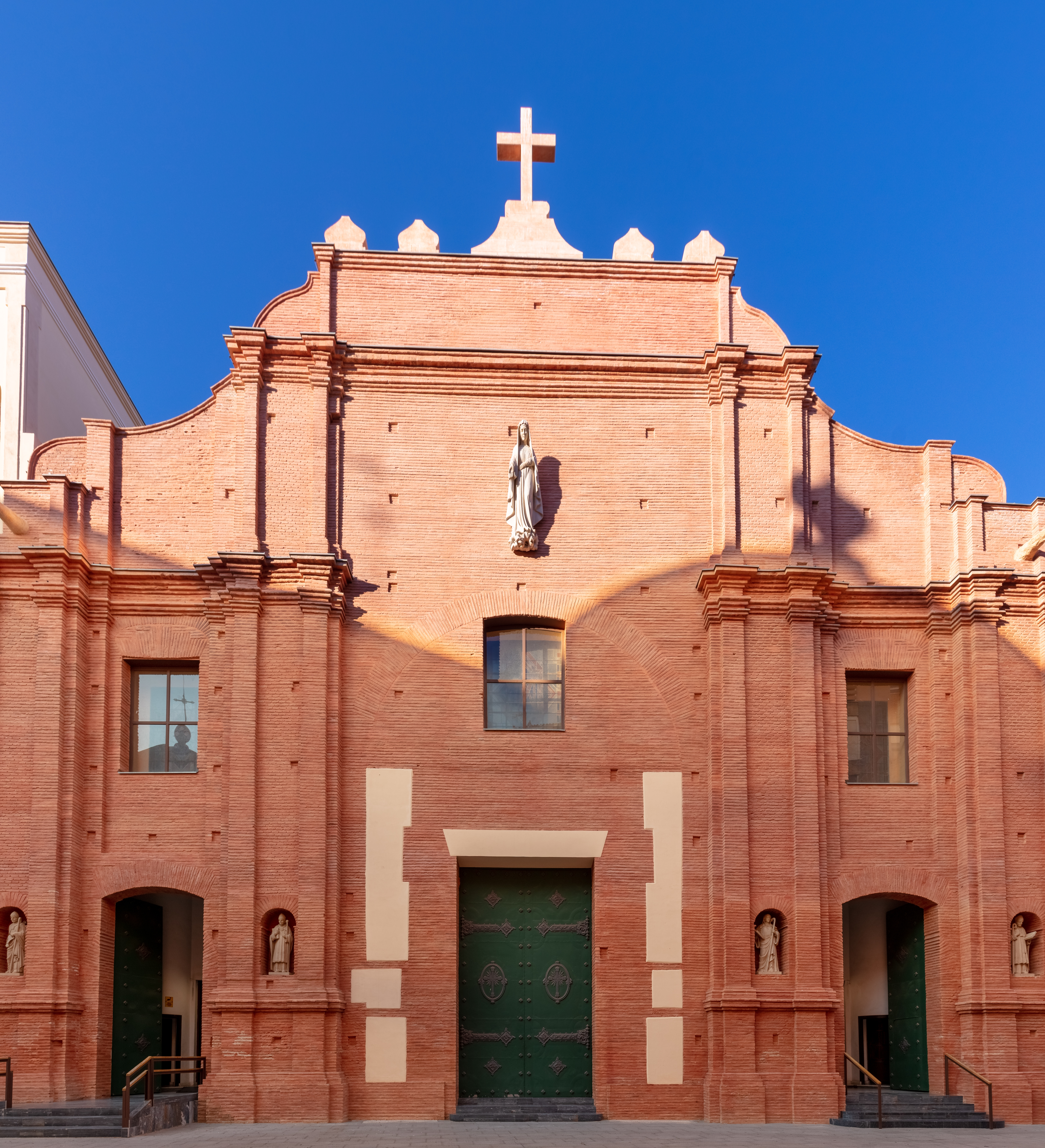
- Our Lady of Grace
- Country: Spain
- Website: http://www.santamariadegracia.org

History
- Dedication: Our Lady of Grace

Architecture
- Style: Baroque
- Years built: Eighteenth Century

Administration
- Diocese: Cartagena

The Church of Our Lady of Grace (Spanish, Santa María de Gracia) is a Catholic church located in the old town of the Spanish city of Cartagena (in the Region of Murcia), and is the nerve center of the Cartagena's Semana Santa processions during Holy Week.

== History ==
In the thirteenth century the seat of the diocese of Cartagena was transferred from Cartagena to Murcia. The City Council of Cartagena disagreed with this and there have been continuing requests that the Vatican returns the seat of the diocese to Cartagena.

The construction project for the church was initiated in 1712 when it was proposed to build a new sanctuary to remedy the shortcomings of the old cathedral and to provide the city with a true diocesan church, since apart from the aforementioned cathedral, at that time Cartagena only had churches attached to religious orders. The church was built with cathedral-like form and dimensions. There are still demands for the restoration of the see to Cartagena..

The chosen site was at the confluence of Calle del Aire and San Miguel, where there was a small hermitage recorded in the writings of Jerónimo Hurtado in 1589 (Descripción de Cartagena y su puerto).

Initially, the new construction faced opposition from the cathedral chapter, but the support of Cardinal Belluga, then bishop of the Diocese, and King Philip V himself enabled the donation of 84 000 reales from the chapter. In this way, work began in 1713, and the execution was divided into three phases: 1716–1749, 1750–1776, and 1780–1798. From the second phase onward, the original plans were abandoned and the directives of the Cartagena brotherhoods — promoters of the chapels—were followed, and, upon completion of that phase, the church was blessed on 5 December 1779.

Since then, it went various renovations and reconstructions—from the one in 1880 that rebuilt the areas damaged by the bombardment during the Cantonal Rebellion (1873), to a deliberate new destruction on 25 July 1936 during the Spanish Civil War, and a restoration in the Neo-Baroque style by Lorenzo Ros Costa in 1943. During the conflict, the parish suffered the murder of its archpriest Pedro Gambín in the Sacas de presos on 15 September 1936, and the building itself was close to being completely devastated, as the Republican Ayuntamiento had approved its demolition—a that was never carried out. Meanwhile, the façade remained unfinished throughout this period despite projects such as that by the Modernist architect Víctor Beltrí in 1931 or that of Rafael Braquehais in 1992, and it awaits, like the rest of the church, a major intervention.

== Architecture ==
The church consists of three naves covered by ribbed vaults and semi-circular arches, supported by pilasters. The chapels are located on the Epistle and Gospel sides, each with its own design. In the central nave, the presbytery is deep and semicircular, and on the main altar one can see the chapel of the Four Saints of Cartagena and the Virgen del Rosell. The choir is located at the foot of the church, as is the tower situated to the northwest, which has a single body. On the main front, the unfinished façade is notable, despite the successive projects that have affected the building.

Of the eight existing chapels, the most notable are the Medinaceli chapel, an 18th‑century Baroque chapel with a Greek cross plan and a dome over pendentives decorated with stucco; the former chapel of the Virgen del Mar, where the undulation of the cornice on which the dome rests stands out; and the California chapel, of similar style and era as the Medinaceli chapel, with a square plan and a dome on pendentives divided into eight sections, rising on a mixed cornice decorated in each section of the axes with rocaille. This dome possesses a drum with paired pilasters between which rectangular windows are opened, also decorated with rocaille.

In the former chapel of the Virgin of the Rosary, now dedicated to Our Lady of Lourdes, the dome painted by the 18th‑century artist Francisco Folch de Cardona depicting the apotheosis of John of Nepomuk is preserved.

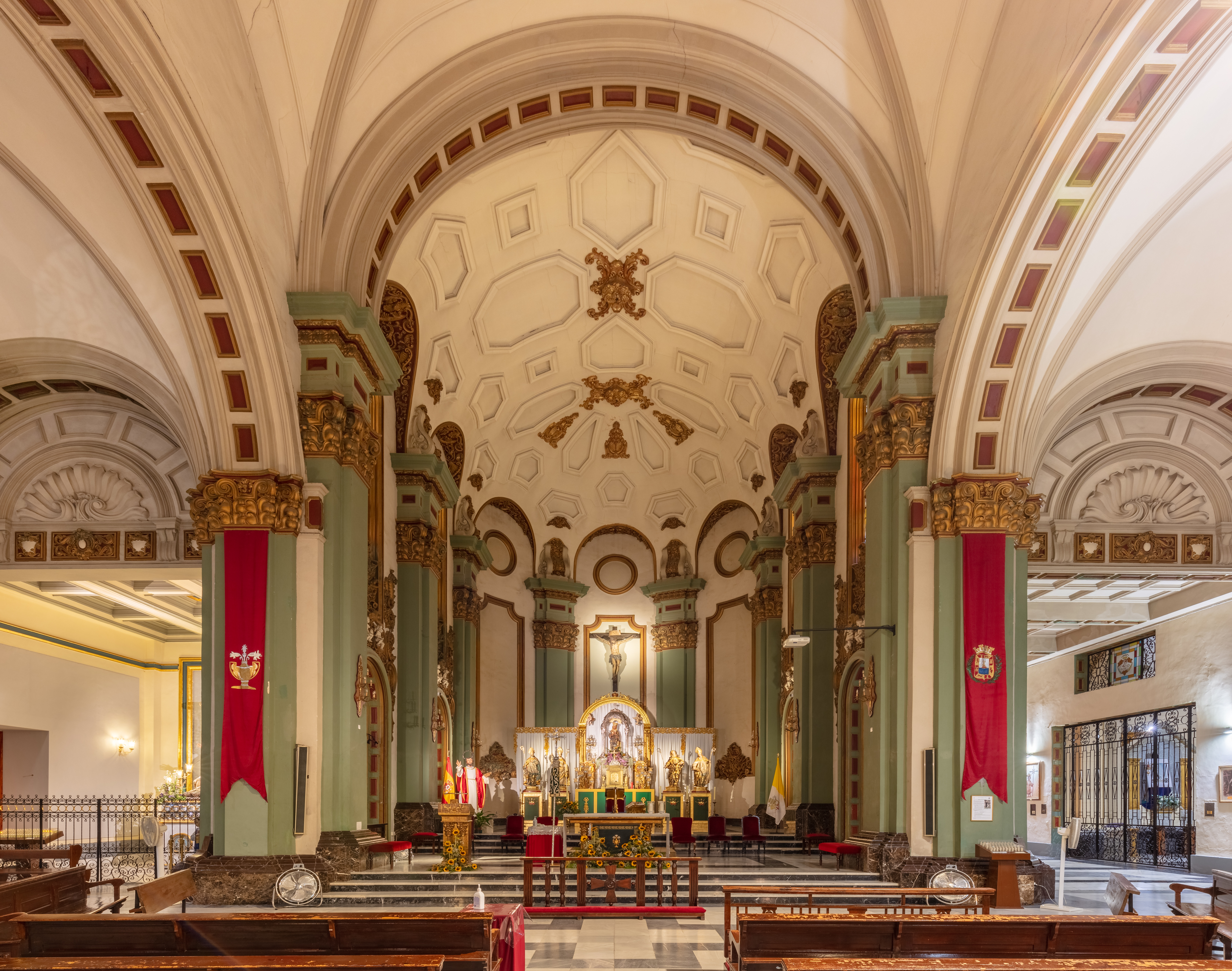
View of the main nave.

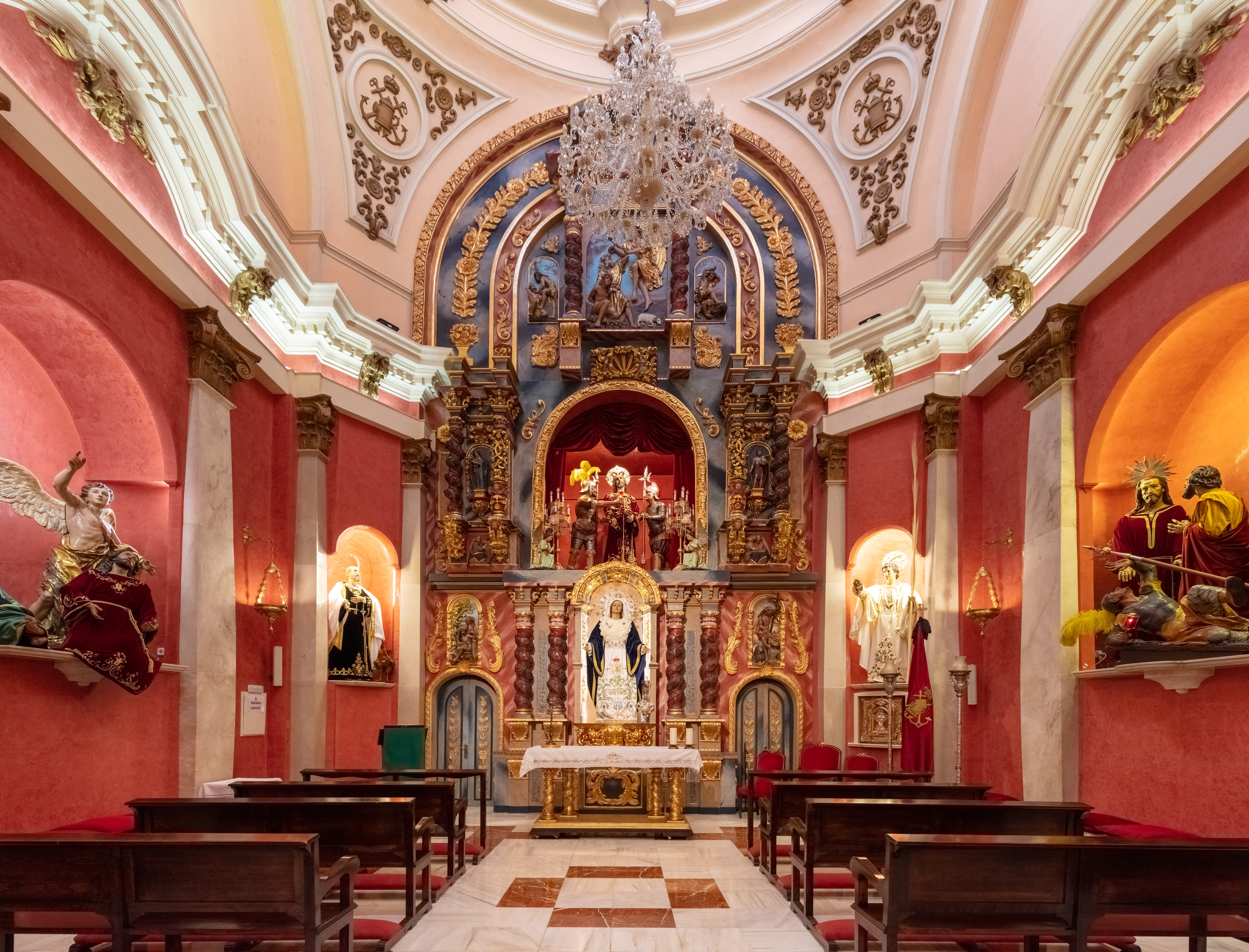
California Chapel.

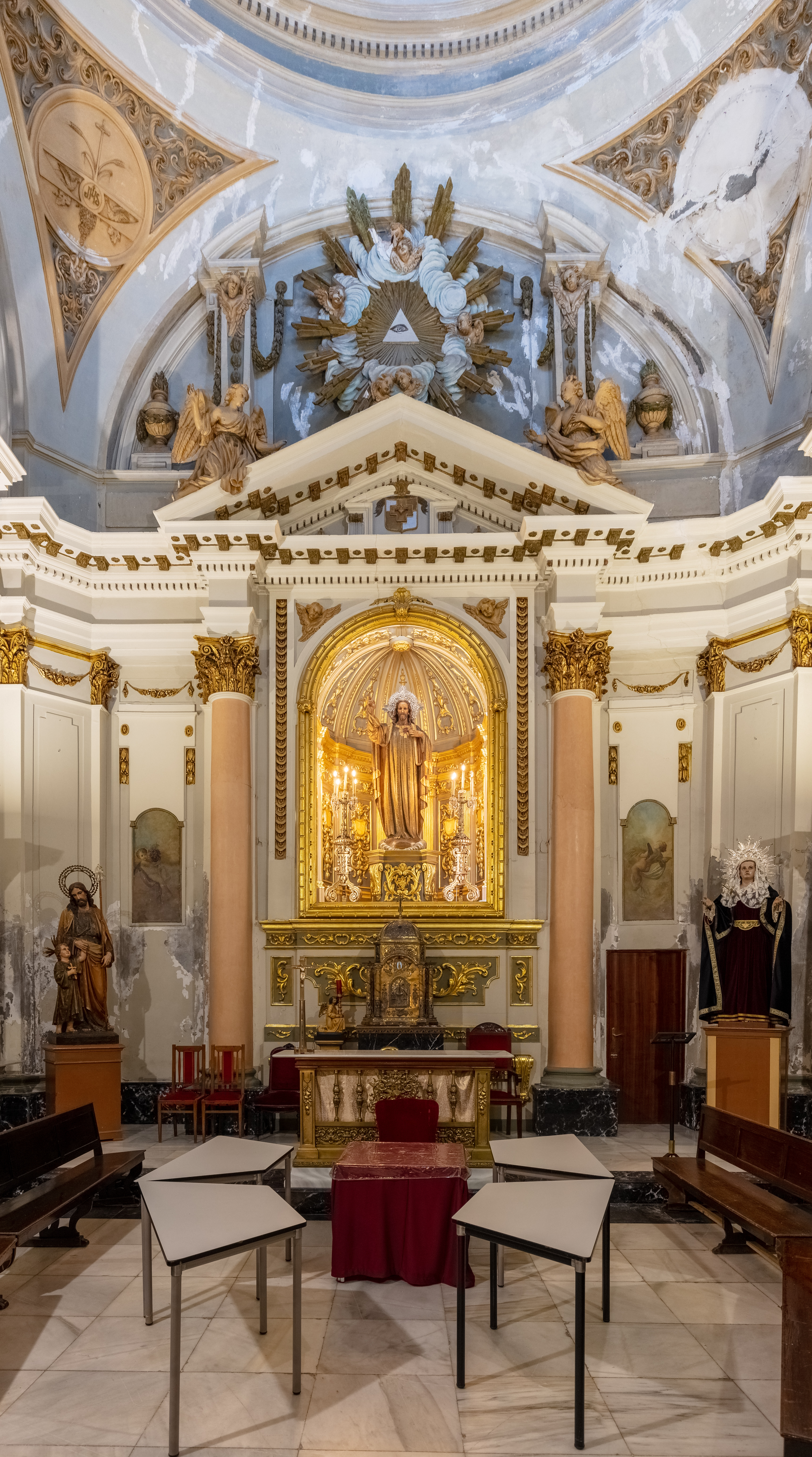
Chapel of the Sacred Heart of Jesus.

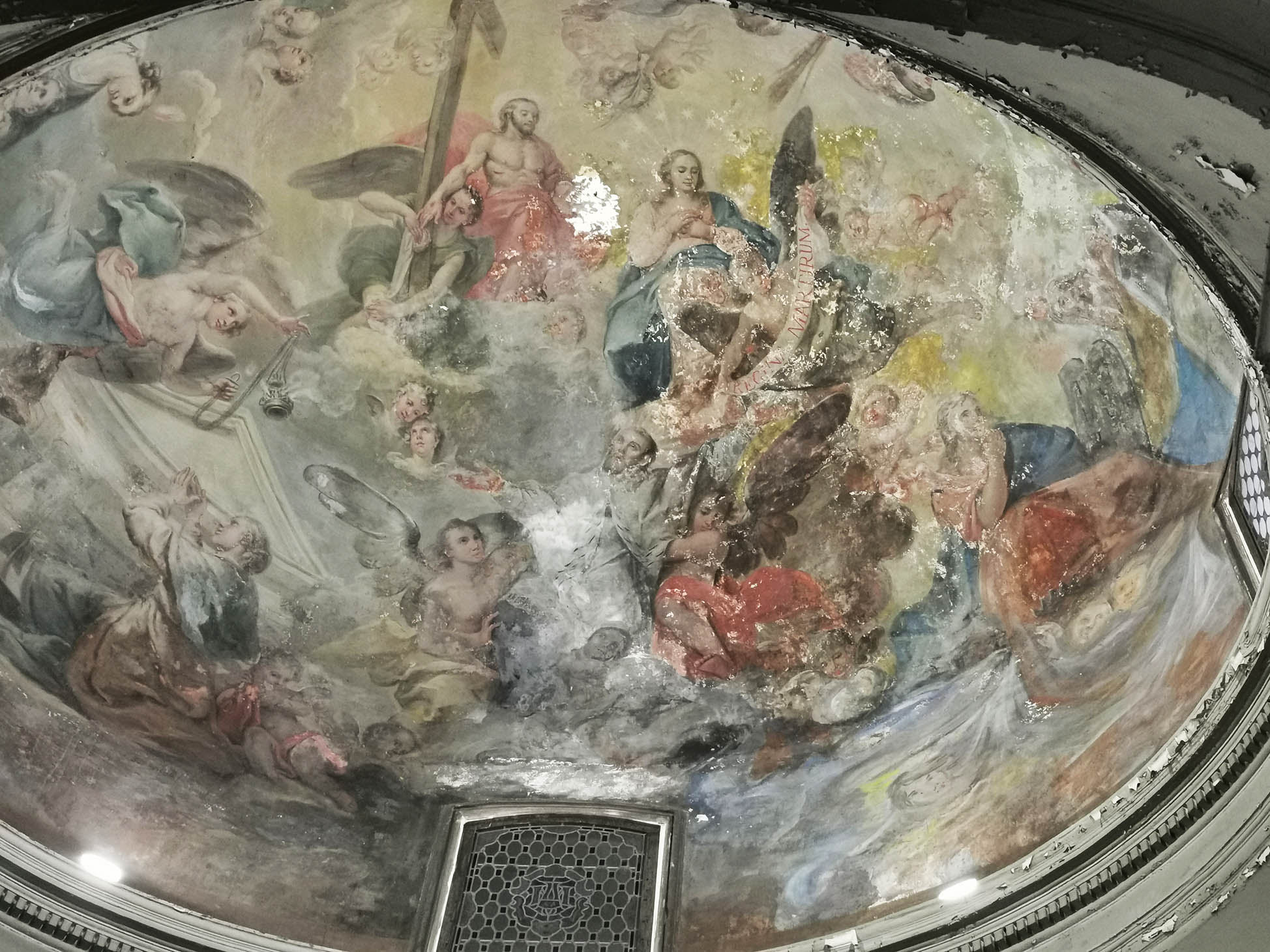
Vault depicting the apotheosis of Saint John of Nepomuk, 18th century, by Francisco Folch de Cardona.

== Art ==
Among the most outstanding works currently found in the church are the images of the Virgin del Rosell, a medieval sculpture that was once the patron of Cartagena, flanked by the notable images of the Cuatro Santos de Cartagena, an 18th‑century Baroque work by sculptor Francisco Salzillo. These five images formerly belonged, before the Spanish Civil War, to the chapel of the Council of the old Cathedral of Cartagena and are now located presiding over the main altar.

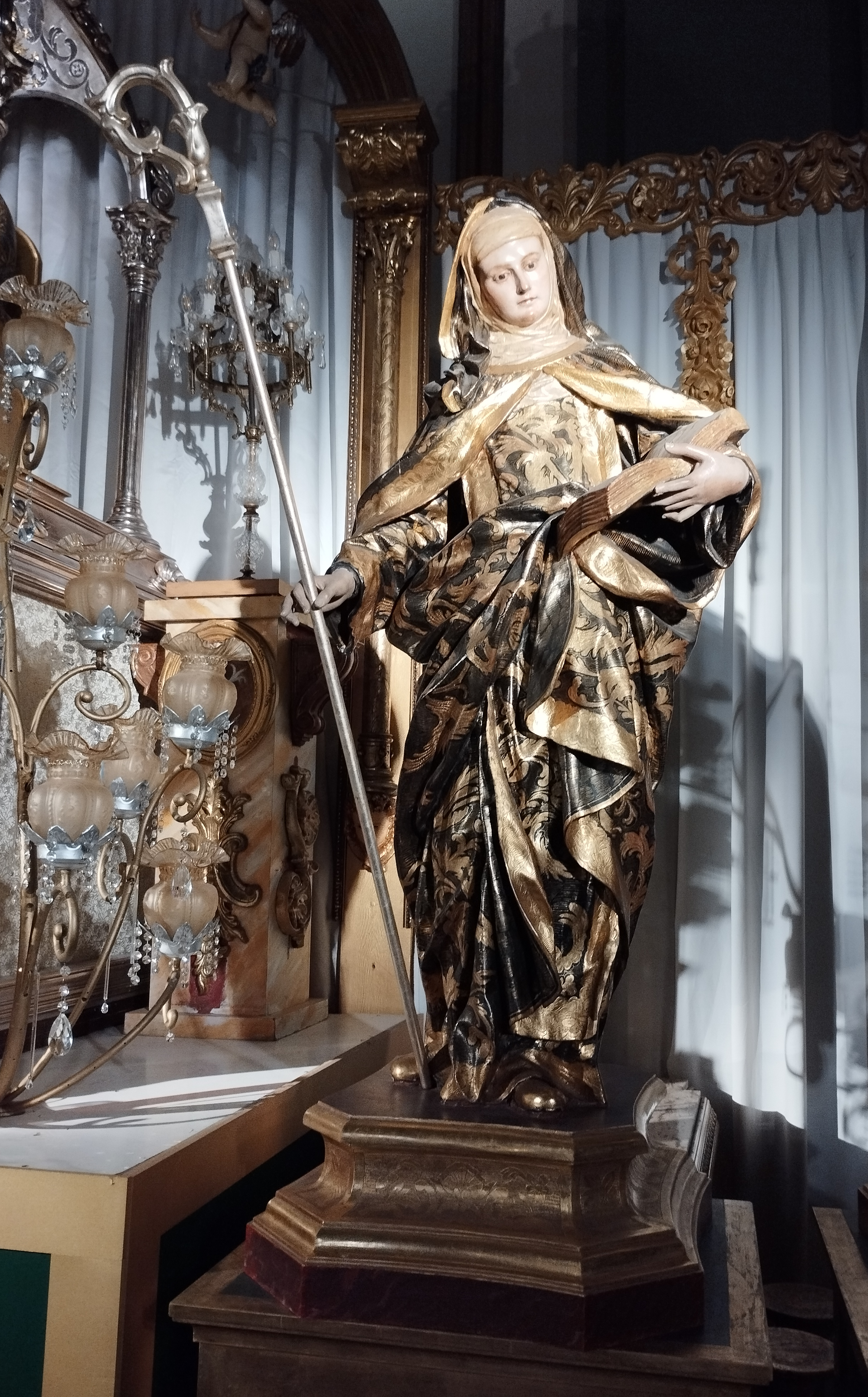
Santa Florentina by Salzillo.

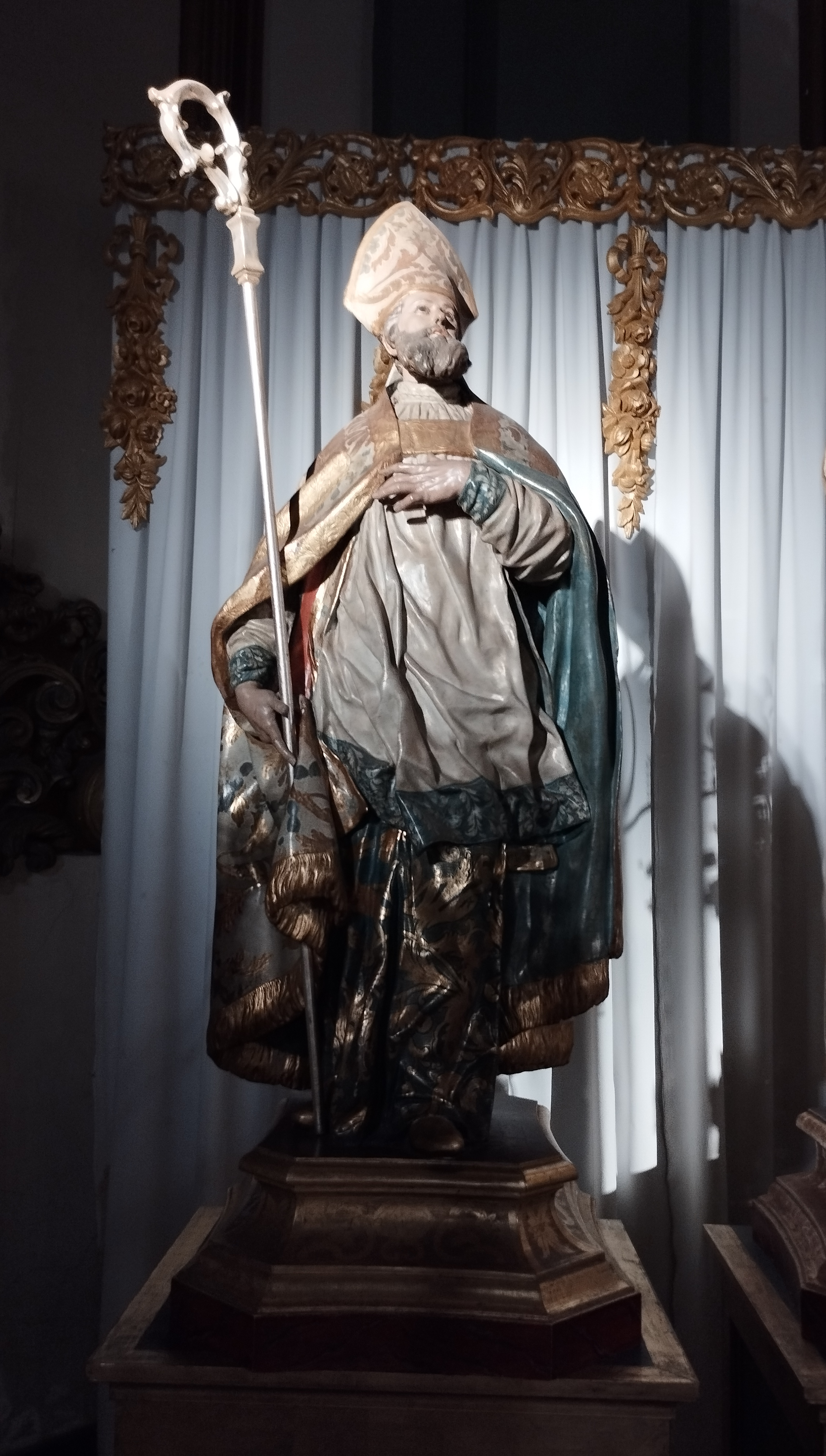
San Leandro by Salzillo.

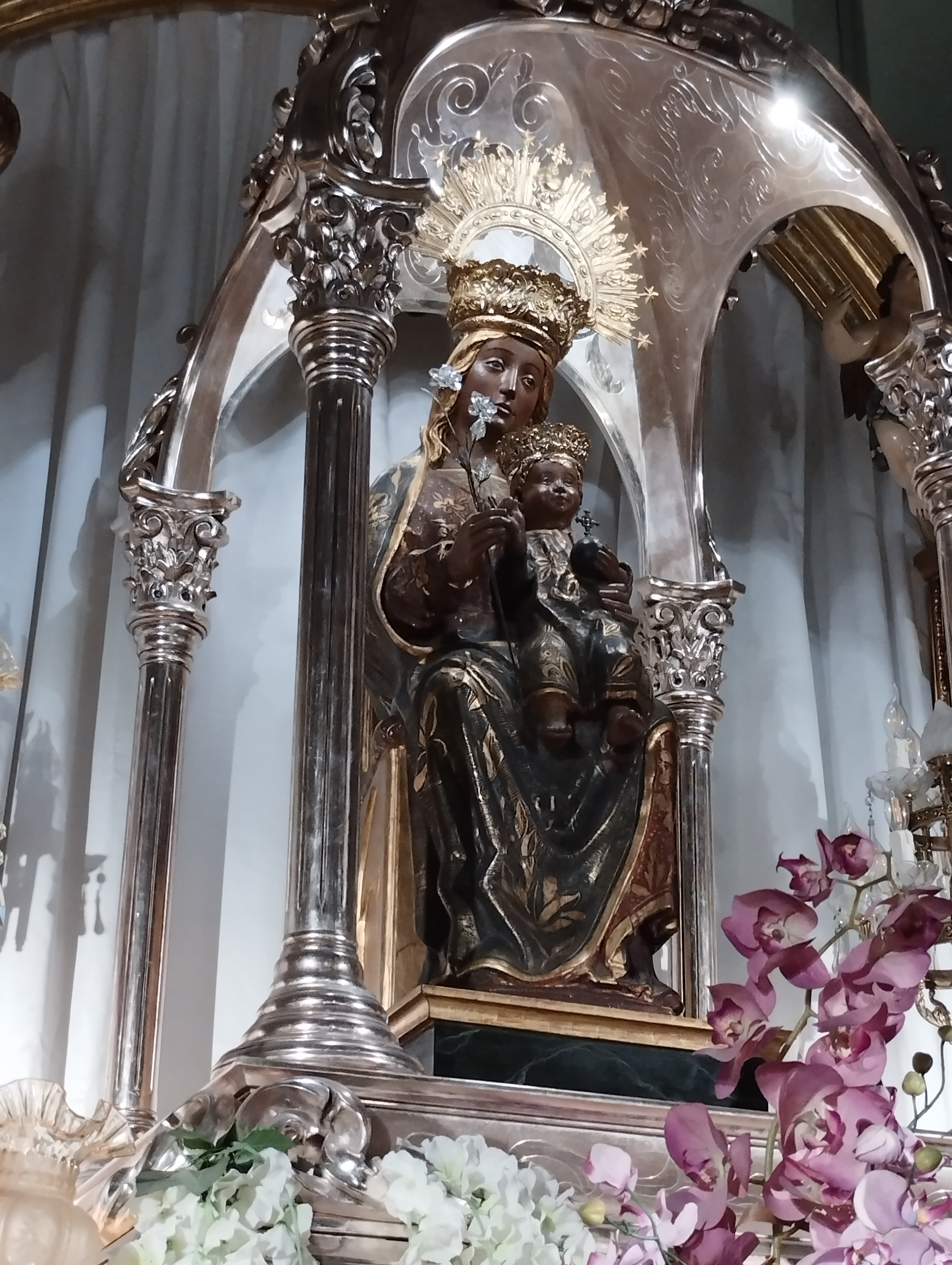
Virgin del Rosell, former patron of Cartagena.

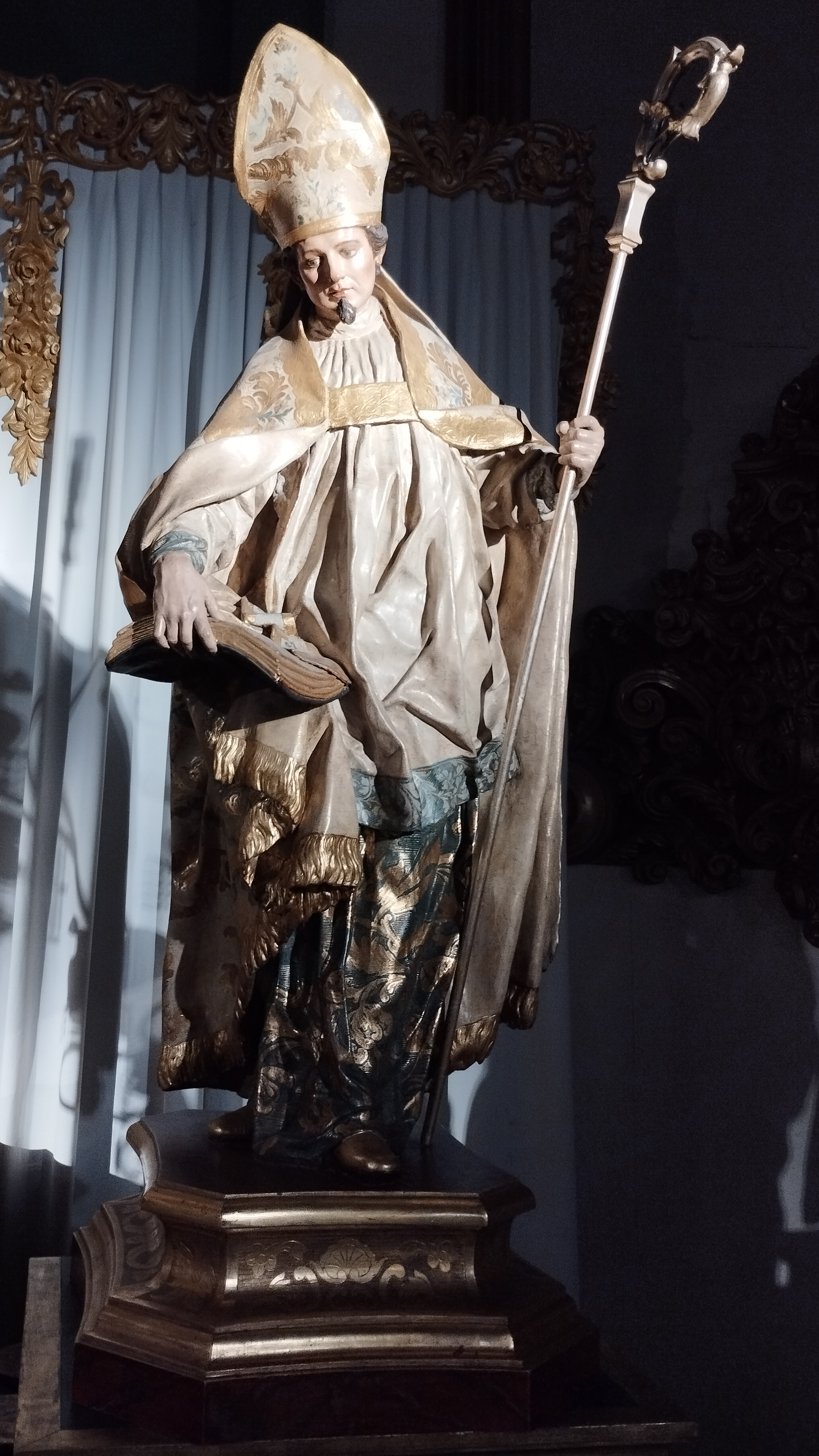
San Isidoro by Salzillo.

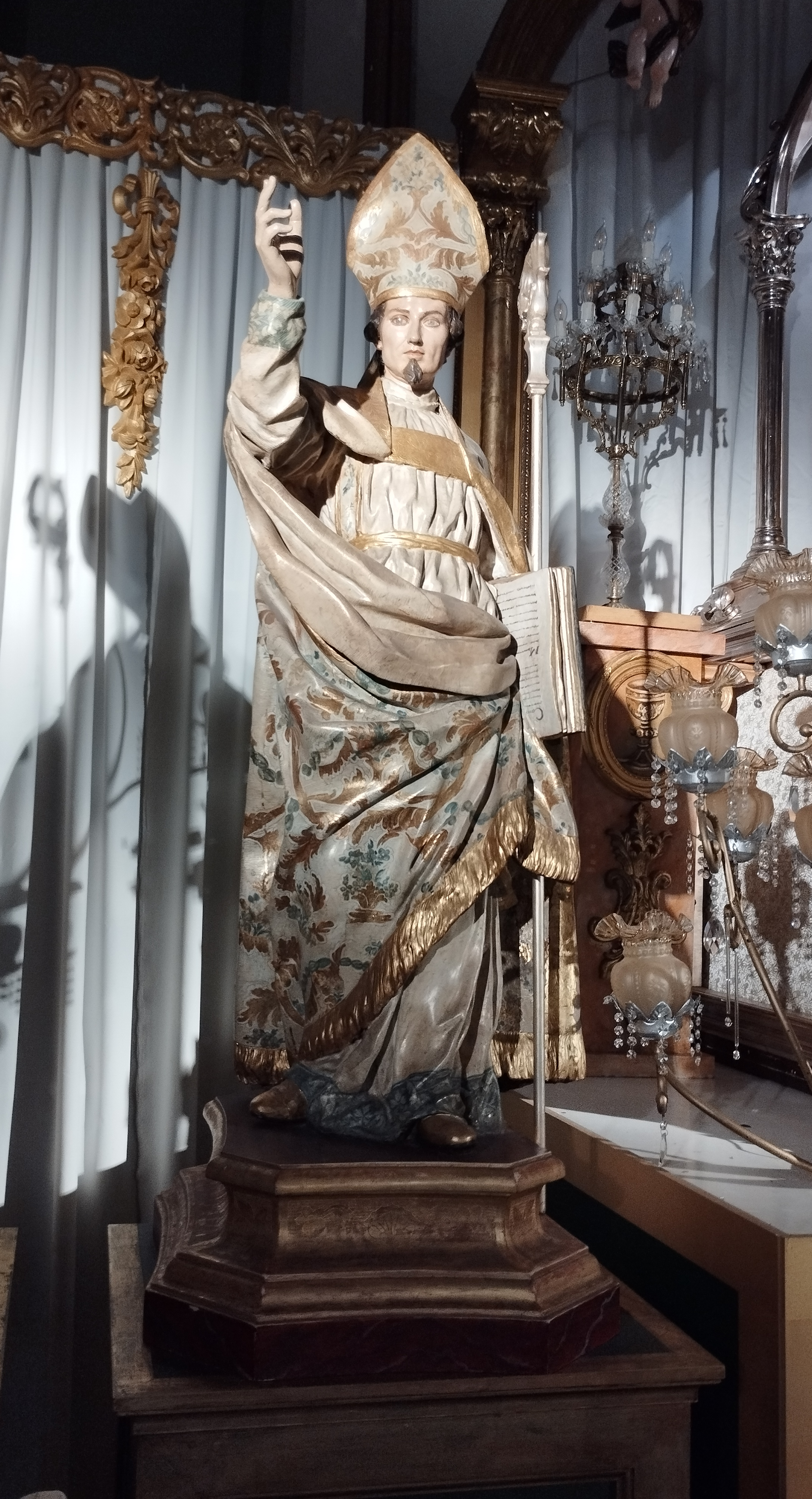
San Fulgencio by Salzillo.

Additionally, besides the mentioned images, there is a Virgin of Piety by José Capuz, and the Christ of Medinaceli by Juan González Moreno. The chapel of the Resurrection Brotherhood also contains other images by González Moreno and those of the California Brotherhood dating to 1747, as well as several works by Salzillo, Mariano Benlliure, or José Sánchez Lozano.

In 2022 the images of the archangels Saint Michael, Saint Raphael and Saint Gabriel, carved by Salzillo for the now-lost altarpiece of the Colegio de San Miguel, were installed in one of the side chapels. Also, an ivory crucified Christ known as the Christ of Lepanto—attributed to a donation by Don Juan de Austria following his triumph in the Battle of Lepanto against the Ottomans—has been moved into the temple.

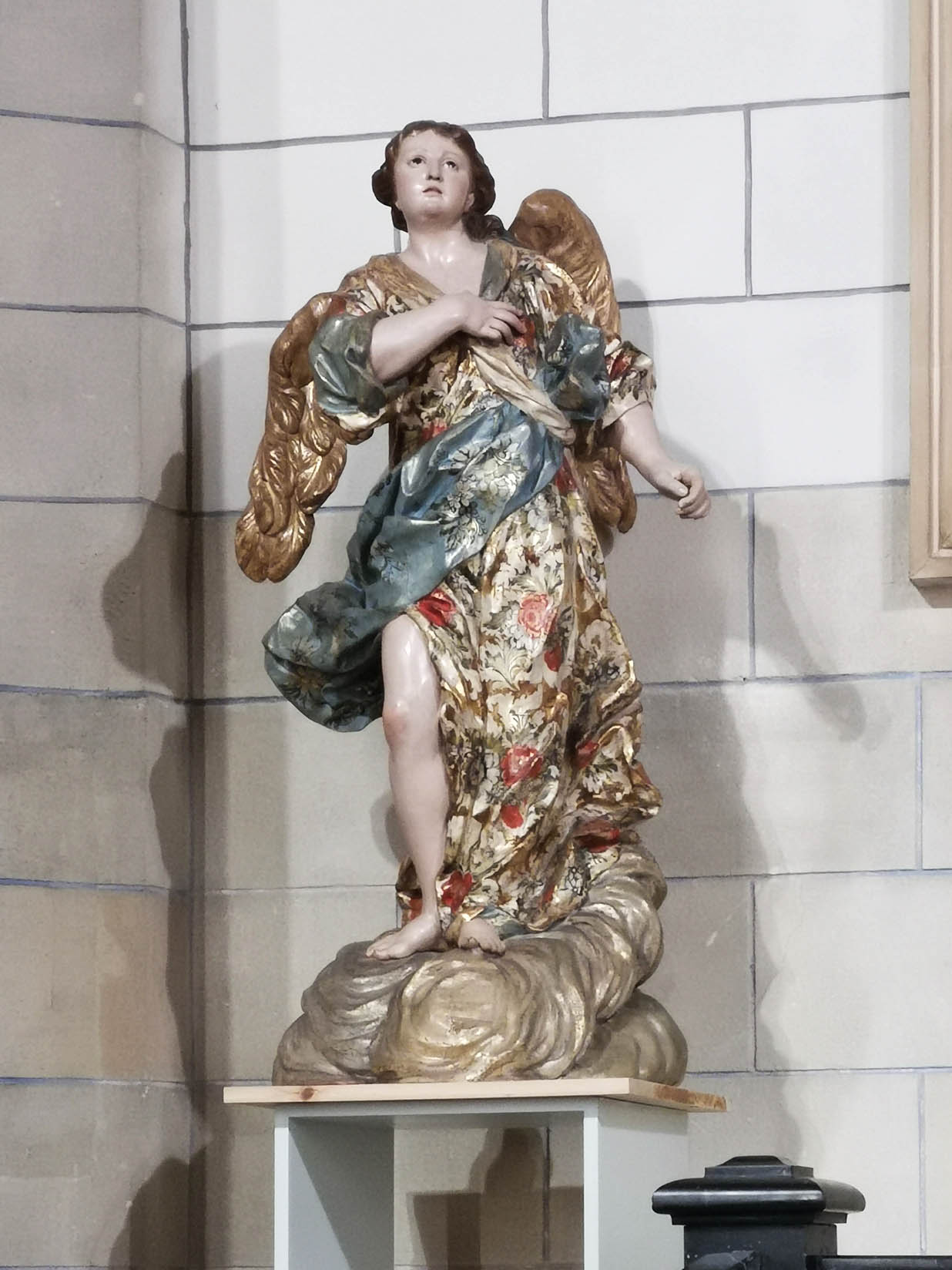
Archangel Gabriel by Salzillo.

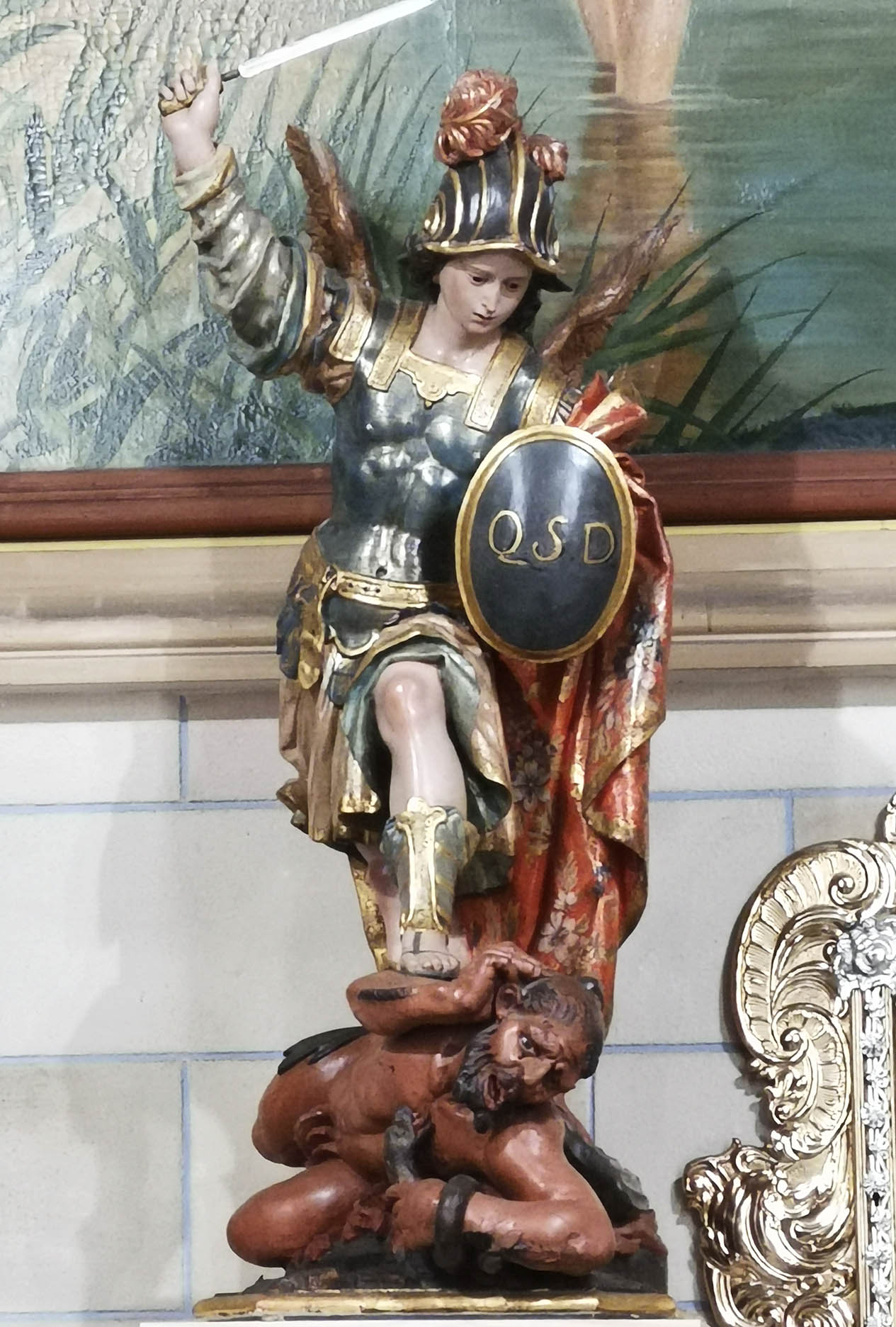
Archangel Michael by Salzillo.

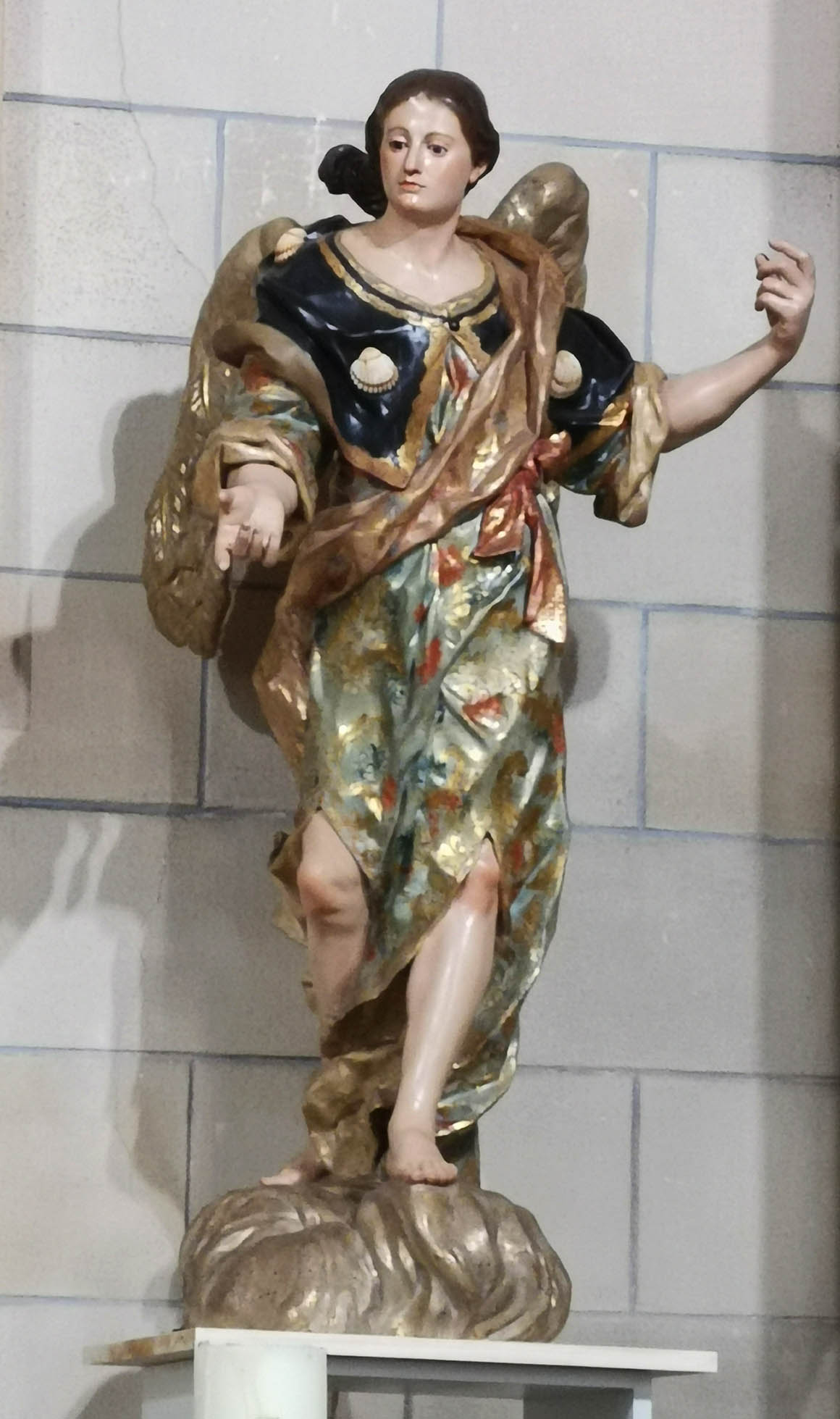
Archangel Raphael by Salzillo.

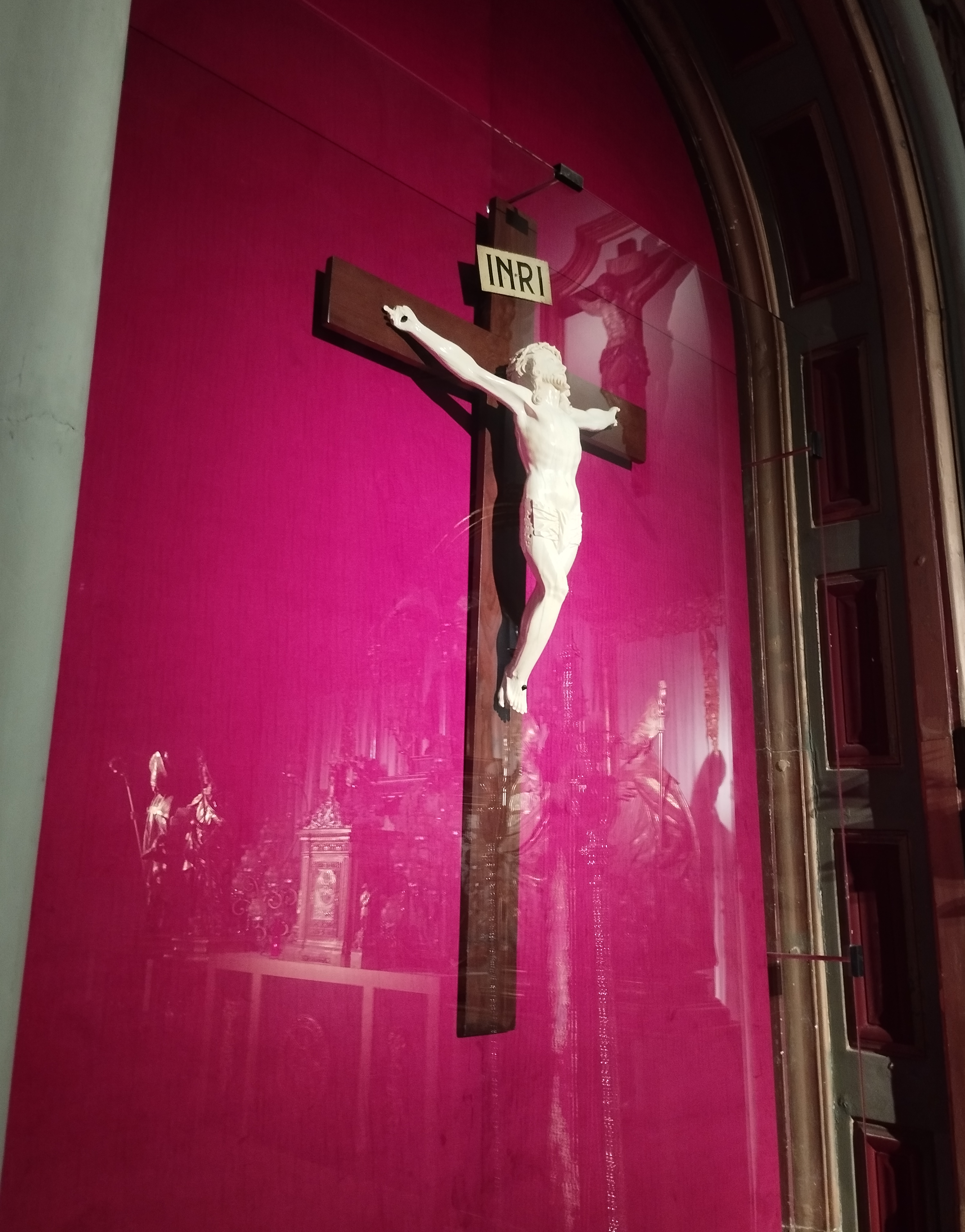
Christ of Lepanto.
