= Four Saints of Cartagena =

Saint Leander, Saint Fulgentius of Cartagena, Saint Florentina and Saint Isidore were brothers of the seventh and eighth centuries known as the Four Saints of Cartagena because they were all born in that city, although there are doubts as to whether Isidore was born in Hispalis (the present-day Seville).

In the Eighteenth Century, the Franciscan Antonio Herráiz said that these saints were "the honor of Cartagena, the glory of Spain, and the enamel of the Catholic faith," and the historian Fernando Hermosino y Parrilla described them as the four torches that illuminated that land. They were important in the conversion of the Visigothic rulers of Spain from Arianism to a more orthodox Christianity.
