= Saint Fulgentius =

Saint Fulgentius may refer to:

- Fulgentius of Cartagena (fl. 7th century) Bishop of Cartagena and Ecija (Astigi), in Hispania
- Fulgentius of Ruspe (462 or 467 — 527 or 533), bishop of the city of Ruspe, North Africa
