= Cartagena Cathedral =

Ruined cathedral in Cartagena, Spain

Coordinates: 37.5992°N 0.9846°W

Cartagena Cathedral Catedral de Cartagena
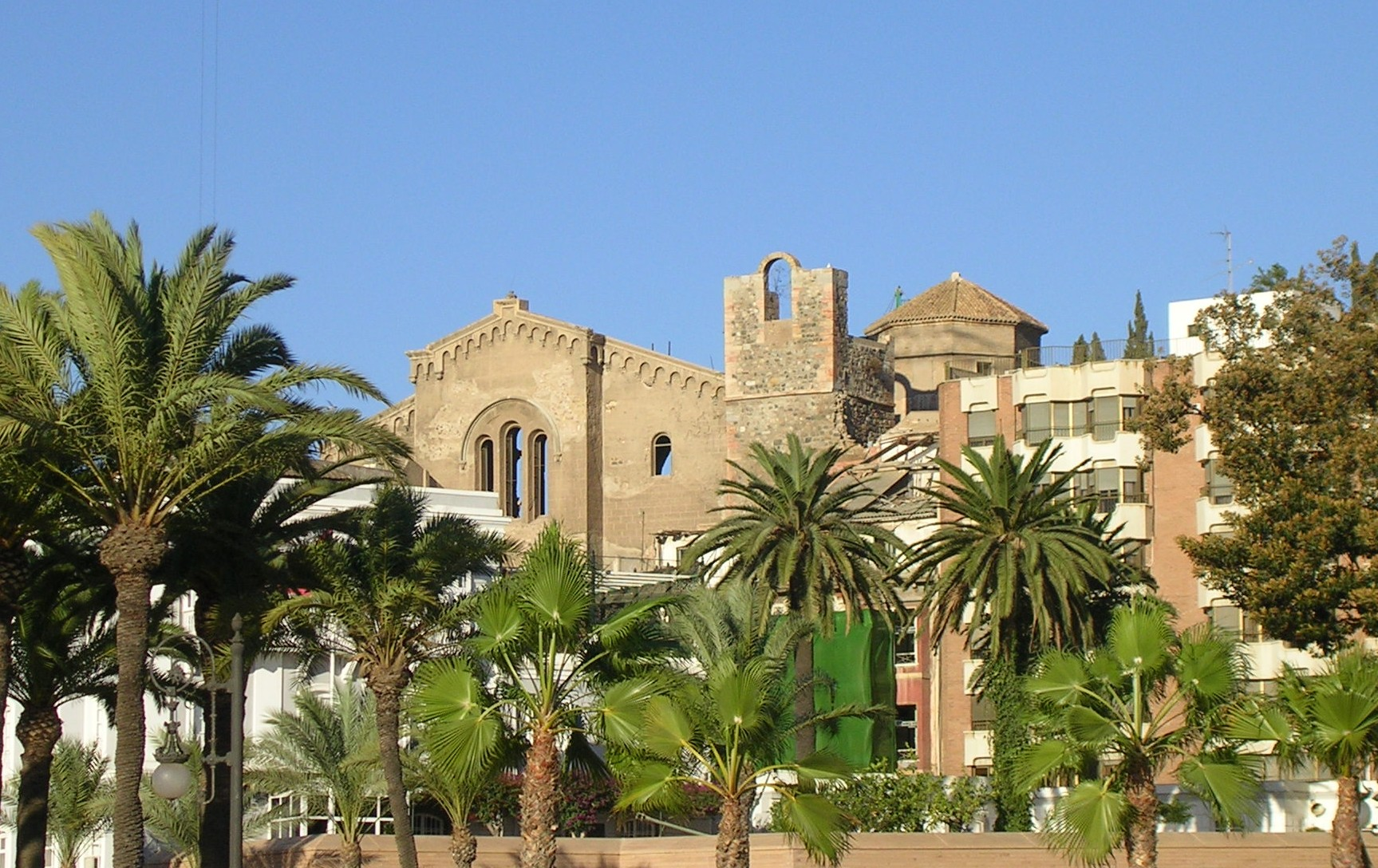
- Ruins of the cathedral of Cartagena

Religion
- Affiliation: Catholic Church

Location
- Location: Cartagena, Spain
- Interactive map of Cartagena Cathedral; Catedral de Cartagena

Architecture
- Type: church
- General contractor: Siglo XIII - Siglo XIX

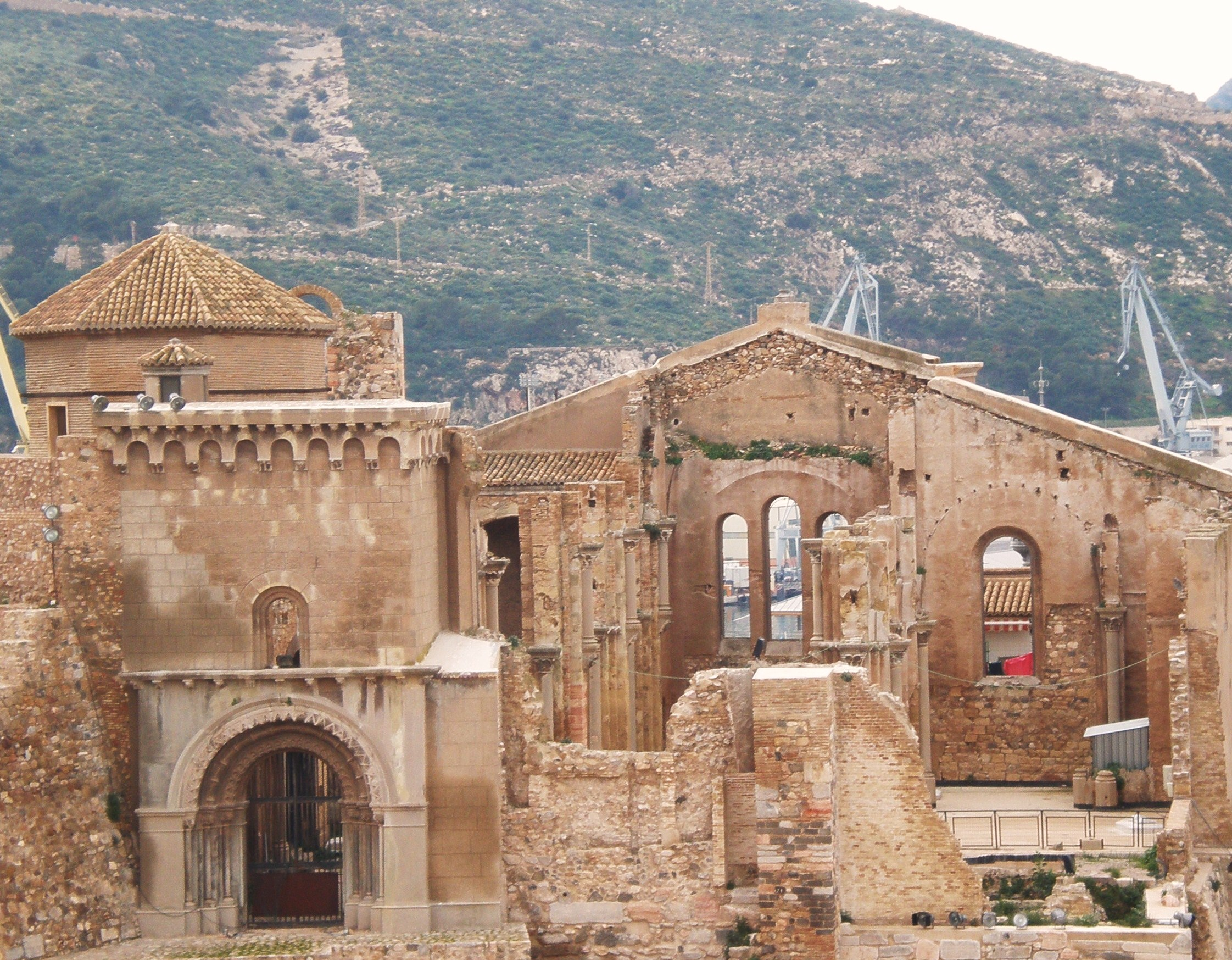
Cathedral ruins

The Cathedral of Cartagena in Spain, or the Cathedral of Santa María la Vieja, was a cathedral of the Diocese of Cartagena, located on the hill of La Concepción in the old town of Cartagena. It has been in ruins since 1939, when it was destroyed when Cartagena was shelled in the Spanish Civil War by Nationalist forces.

== History ==
Despite the importance of the pre Islamic diocese of Cartagena no trace of the pre-conquest cathedral has been found to date. In 1243 after Alfonso X of Castile reconquered Murcia, he petitioned Pope Innocent IV to restore the Diocese of Cartagena due to its former importance which was granted in 1250.

There is inconclusive evidence whether there was a cathedral in Cartagena after the diocese was restored. In medieval and Renaissance documents the church is described as "Iglesia Mayor", and is only called "Old Cathedral" from the eighteenth century.

The Military Order of Santa María de España, Castille's early navy, established around 1270 by Alfonso in a Cistercian monastery in Cartagena, may have been based at the Cathedral.

After the death of Bishop Pedro Gallego, the elected García Martínez took over the leadership of the episcopate (referred to as "elected" because he was never consecrated as bishop) applied to transfer the see to Murcia, although retaining the name of Diocese of Cartagena. The church therefore lost its status of a cathedral, and became a parish church.

It would be under Bishop Diego Martínez Magaz that the transfer of the diocesan capital to Murcia would be formalized in 1291 with the consent of King Sancho IV, although the diocese continued to be called "Carthaginensis," transferring the episcopal seat and chapter to Murcia, where the bishop had resided de facto for some time.

The City Council of Cartagena was never in agreement with the transfer of the seat of the diocese, and throughout the centuries, there were continuing demands to the Vatican for the restitution of the bishopric to Cartagena. As a result, the construction of the current Church of Our Lady of Grace (Cartegena) began in the 18th century, a large church with cathedral-like form and dimensions, intended to become the seat of the Carthaginensis diocese due to the poor condition of the original cathedral of Santa María. There are still demands for the restoration of the see to Cartagena.

The Cofradía del Sucorro, one of the four brotherhoods that run processions in Holy Week in Cartagena were centered around the statue of Christ Crucified - the Christ of Succour - which was venerated in the Cathedral. The brotherhood was founded in 1691 by Pedro Manuel Colón de Portugal, and at the time the admiral of the Spanish Navy, as an aristocratic brotherhood after one of his sons had been miraculously cured two years earlier by the statue.

In the late nineteenth century the foundations of the medieval church collapsed. The church was restored by the architect Victor Beltrí, in Romanesque style with modernist elements. In 1871, the alabaster altarpiece that adorned one of the side chapels was removed from the cathedral as a result of its donation by the City Council to the collections of the National Archaeological Museum of Spain in Madrid, which opened that same year.

During the Spanish Civil War the church was attacked and the contents damaged on 25 July 1936. In 1939 it was shelled by the Nationalists and has remained abandoned since then.

In the Spanish Civil War the sacking of the Cathedral by the locally dominant Republicans meant that the original statue and its setting were destroyed.

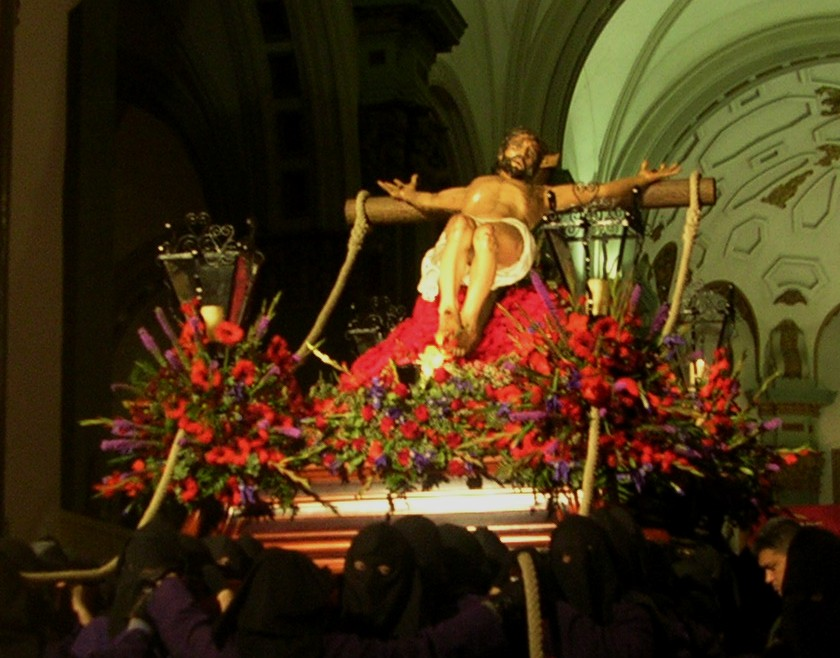
The copy of the destroyed Cristo del Socorro statue

== Roman theatre ==
In 1988 a Roman theatre was discovered during building works near the old cathedral. It was found that the old cathedral had been built over the upper part of the theatre, using some material from the theatre.
