= Antonio Filangieri =

Italian-born Spanish army officer (1752–1808)

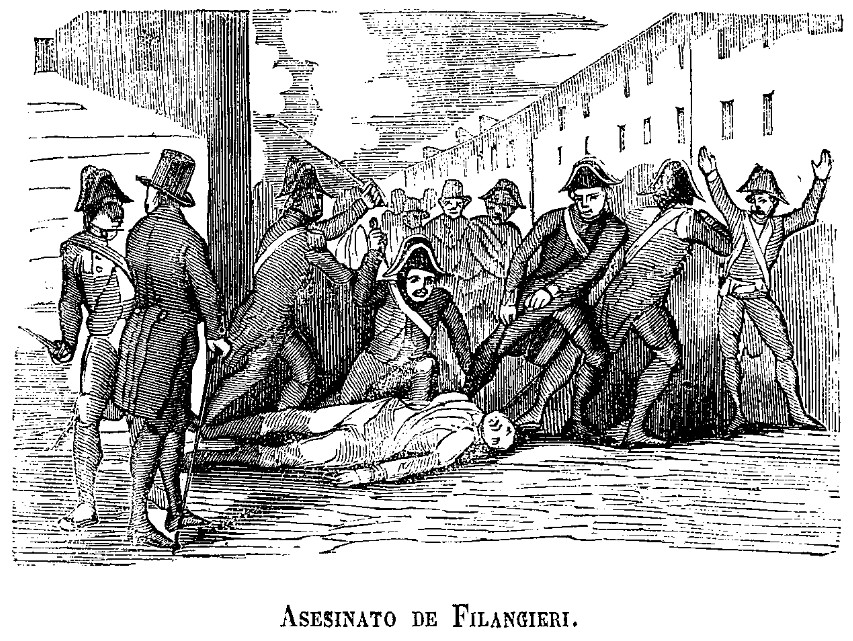
- Assassination of General Filangieri (1846 engraving)
- Born: 27 June 1752; San Sebastiano al Vesuvio, Nápoles
- Died: 24 June 1808 (aged 55) Villafranca del Bierzo, León
- Conflicts: War of the Pyrenees; Battle of Orbaizeta; Peninsular War

Antonio Filangieri (Note: Oman (1902) spells it Filanghieri.) (27 June 1752 – 24 June 1808) was an Italian-born military commander who saw active service under the Spanish Crown, eventually being appointed captain-general of Galicia. Filangieri was one of the three captains-general slain by mobs following the Madrid Uprising (2 May 1808), the other two being Francisco Solano, 2nd Marquis de Socorro in Cádiz, and Count Torre del Fresno, in Estremadura.

== Family ==
Antonio Filangieri was the brother of Gaetano Filangieri, and uncle of Carlo Filangieri.

== Career ==
In 1796, following his service during the War of the Pyrenees, Filangieri was promoted to lieutenant general and appointed military commander of Catalonia.

=== Peninsular War ===
Following the Dos de Mayo Uprising, on 29 May 1808, Filangieri was named Captain-general of Galicia in substitution of Francisco de Biedma y Zayas who had only held the post since 11 May, having been appointed upon the death of Francisco Taranco y Llano and who had been in favour of allowing the French troops to occupy Galicia.

==== Army of Galicia ====
Towards the end of June 1808, Filangieri, as commander in chief of the Army of Galicia, entered Benavente. (Note: This was unrelated to the cavalry clash known as the Battle of Benavente which took place at the end of that same year between the British cavalry under Lord Paget and the French Chasseurs à cheval under General Lefebvre-Desnouettes, who was taken prisoner. The British cavalry were covering Sir John Moore's retreat towards Corunna.) The Army, then numbering 60,000 troops, including militiamen, plus 20 companies of Grenadiers. Second in command was the Marquis of Castrojal with Brigadier Joaquin Blake as the Quartel Maestre general. The aides-de-camp were the Marquis of Almeyra and Baron Alcaly (Alcahalí). The divisions were as follows:

- 1st Division: Field Marshal Geronimo Verdes
- 2nd Division: Felipe Jado Cagigal
- 3rd Division: Rafael Marinego
- 4th Division: Ignacio Riquelmi
- 5th Division: Militia Brigadier José Meneses

Given his frail health, Filangieri was substituted in the command by Blake on 20 June, just days before being killed by an angry mob of soldiers.
