= Semana Santa in Cartagena =

Religious parades in Cartagena

Holy Week in Cartagena
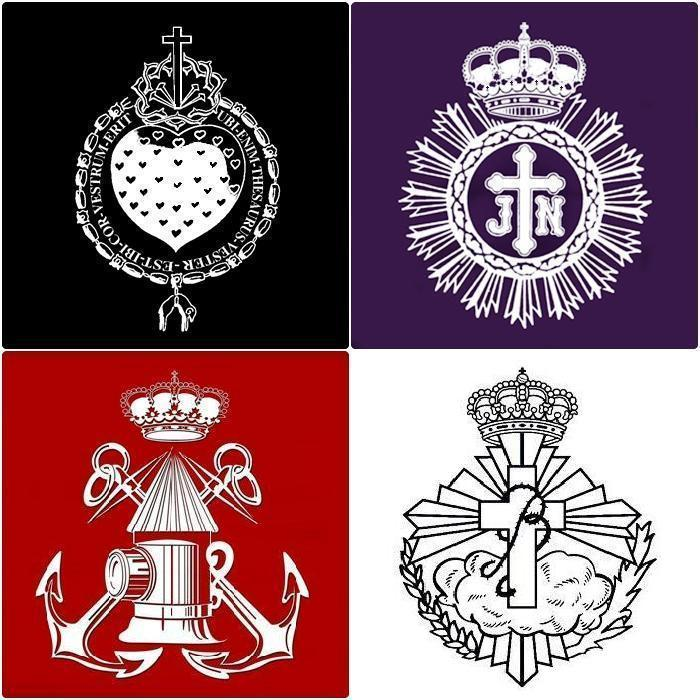
- The four Cartagena brotherhoods: del Socorro, Marraja, California, and del Resucitado.
- Official name: Semana Santa de Cartagena
- Observed by: Cartagena (Region of Murcia), Spain
- Type: Religious, Historical, Cultural
- Significance: Commemoration of the passion, death and resurrection of Jesus
- Celebrations: Processions
- Begins: Palm Sunday
- Ends: Easter Sunday
- 2024 date: March 24 – March 31
- 2025 date: April 13 – April 20
- 2026 date: March 29 – April 5
- 2027 date: March 21 – March 28
- Frequency: Annual

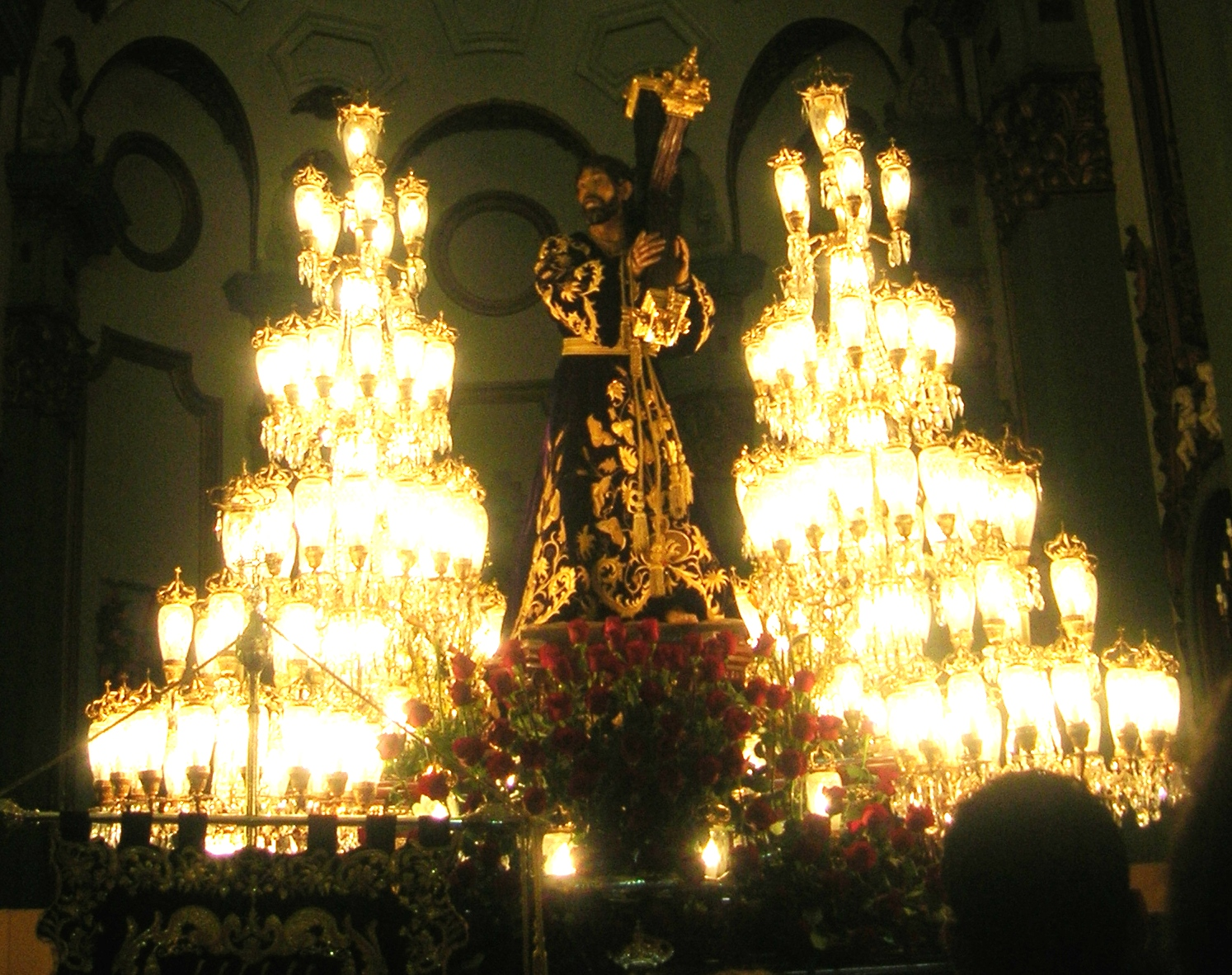
Float of Jesus of Nazareth on Good Friday

Semana Santa in Cartagena are a series of parades in the period around Holy Week They are unique for Holy Week processions in Spain due to their strict order along with other characteristics. The Spanish government declared it a Fiesta of International Tourist Interest in 2005.

== Brotherhoods ==
The processions in Cartagena are organized by four brotherhoods.

Every brotherhood is divided into smaller groups ("agrupaciones"), each in charge of one of the floats in the procession. Women have recently been brought into more roles but do not always wear the hood and robe.

There are two main brotherhoods, the Californios and Marrajos, who have a strong rivalry which is seen as one of the reasons Cartagena maintains so many major parades. Unlike normal practice in Spain (and with the other two Cartagena groups) these two groups put on more than one parade in Holy Week.

=== Californios ===
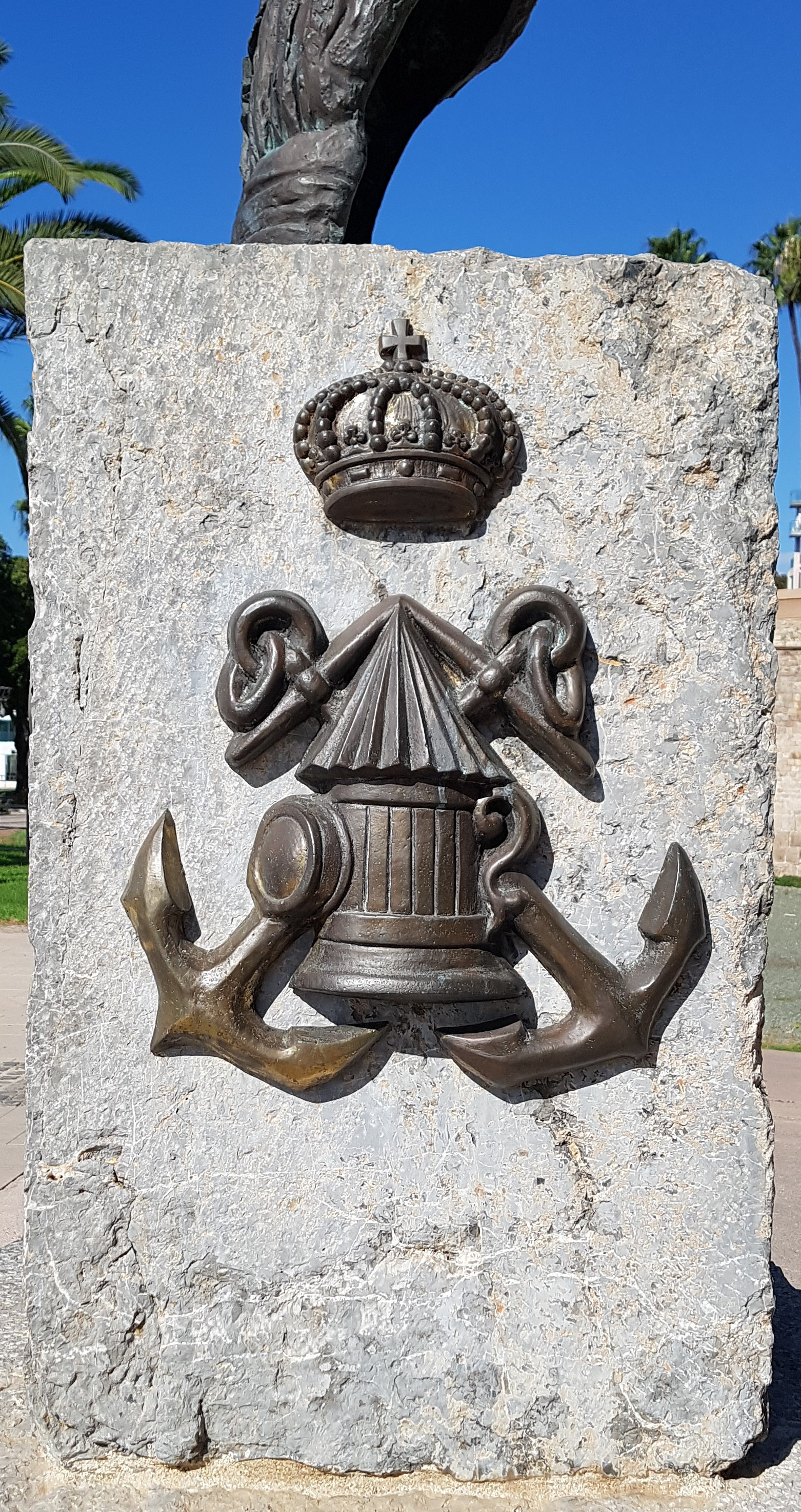
Arms of the Californios on a monument to Charles III of Spain

The brotherhood of the Hour of Our Lord Jesus´ Arrest (known as "Californios") organises the processions that take place on the evening of Friday of Passion Week, on Holy Tuesday and Holy Wednesday and on Maundy Thursday. The colour of this brotherhood is red. They were founded in 1747, but in 1754 joined with a similar brotherhood in Madrid and adopted their symbols as well as the Pontifical and Royal titles. After a difficult time in the early nineteenth century they experienced a revival with new members from the managers and owners from the mining boom in Cartagena. The name Californio either came from the recruitment of sailors who had been on an expedition to California or from the opulence of their floats which drew comparison with the wealth from the California Gold Rush.

=== Marrajos ===
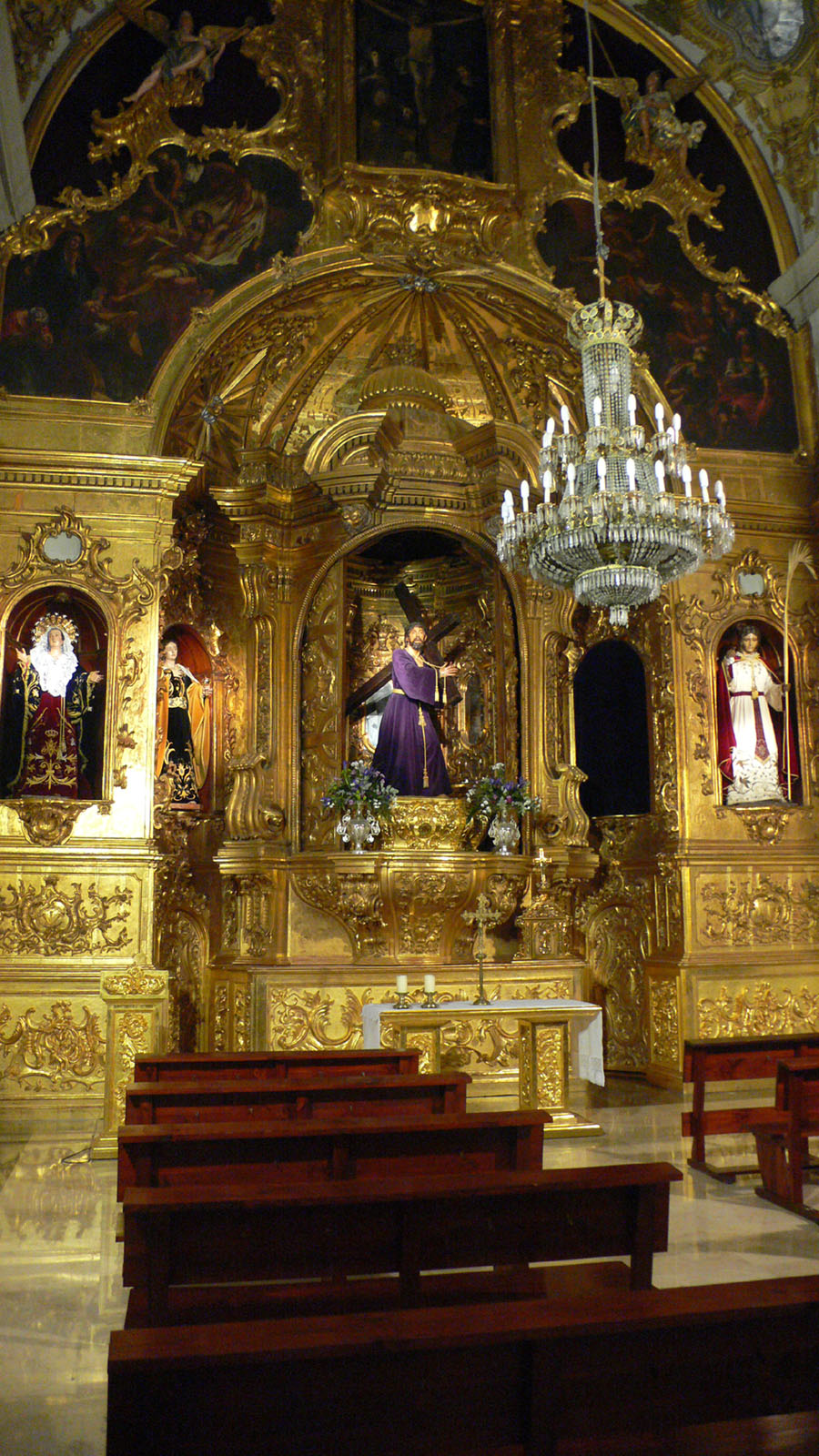
The brotherhood's chapel in Saint Dominic's church, Cartagena

The brotherhood of Our Lord Jesus of Nazareth (known as Marrajos) is in charge of the processions held on Holy Monday, on the early hours of Good Friday, in the evening of Good Friday and on Holy Saturday. The colour of this brotherhood is purple.

It is not known exactly when this group was formed but the Marrajos' tradition is that they were founded in the sixteenth century as a religious brotherhood of fishermen. The tradition is that name came from the sale one year of a mako shark (marrajo in Spanish) to pay for their parade.

The earliest documentary evidence is from 1641 when they obtained a chapel within the Dominican friary, a deep link that would last until the expulsion of the Order in 1835. which is now the church of Saint Dominic, Cartagena. The Senior Brother was exiled from Spain for supporting the losing Hapsburg claimant in the War of the Spanish Succession.

Despite the church of Saint Dominic being repurposed in 1880 as the base for the chaplaincy of the naval base the brotherhood hit challenging times, with them being unable to hold a procession in a few of the early years of the Twentieth Century although in 1917 the brotherhood instituted Alfonso XIII as an honorary member.

=== Cofradía del Socorro ===
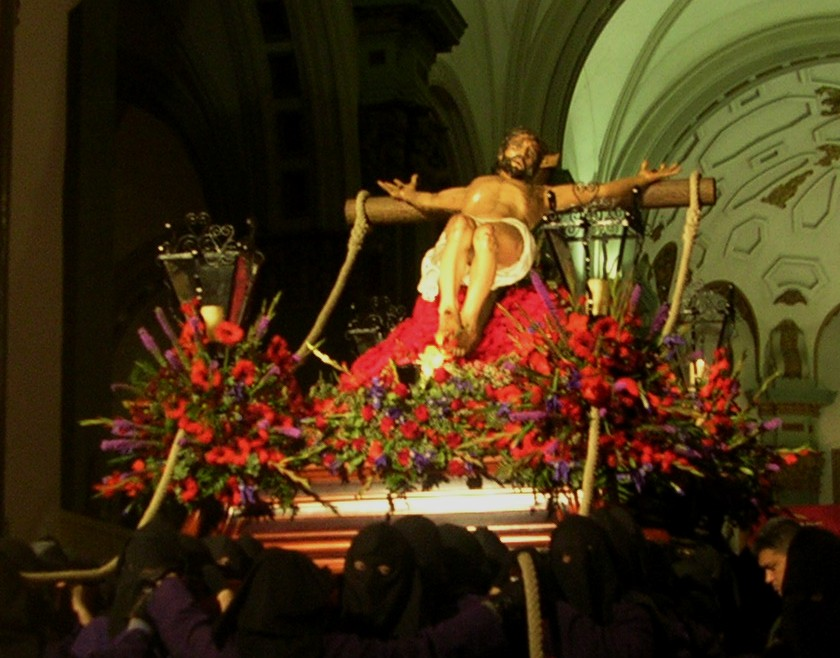
The Cristo del Socorro statue

The penitential brotherhood of the Christ of Succour (Spanish: Ilustre Cofradía del Santísimo y Real Cristo del Socorro) is an austerely penitential brotherhood.

The original brotherhood was founded in 1691 by Pedro Manuel Colón de Portugal, at the time the admiral of the Spanish Navy, as an aristocratic brotherhood after one of his sons had been miraculously cured two years earlier before a Black Christ statue of Christ Crucified—the Christ of Succour—which was venerated in the Cathedral of Cartagena and had been taken out in a rogation procession. In gratitude, the Duke founded the Illustrious Brotherhood of the Fellowship of Knights of the Most Holy Christ of Succour as a devotional confraternity.

The brotherhood later discontinued.

In the Spanish Civil War the old Cathedral was sacked by the Republicans meaning that the original statue and its setting were destroyed. The brotherhood was refounded in 1961 in its current form as a more austere brotherhood with the purpose of leading the via crucis.

They lead the prayer of the Stations of the Cross (via crucis) around the city staying at 3.30 in the morning of the Friday of Sorrows in Passion Week (the Friday before Good Friday). This is when the festivity of the Patron Saint of the city, Our Lady of Charity, takes place. This is the first Holy Week parade in Spain. The colour of this brotherhood is black.

=== Resucitados ===
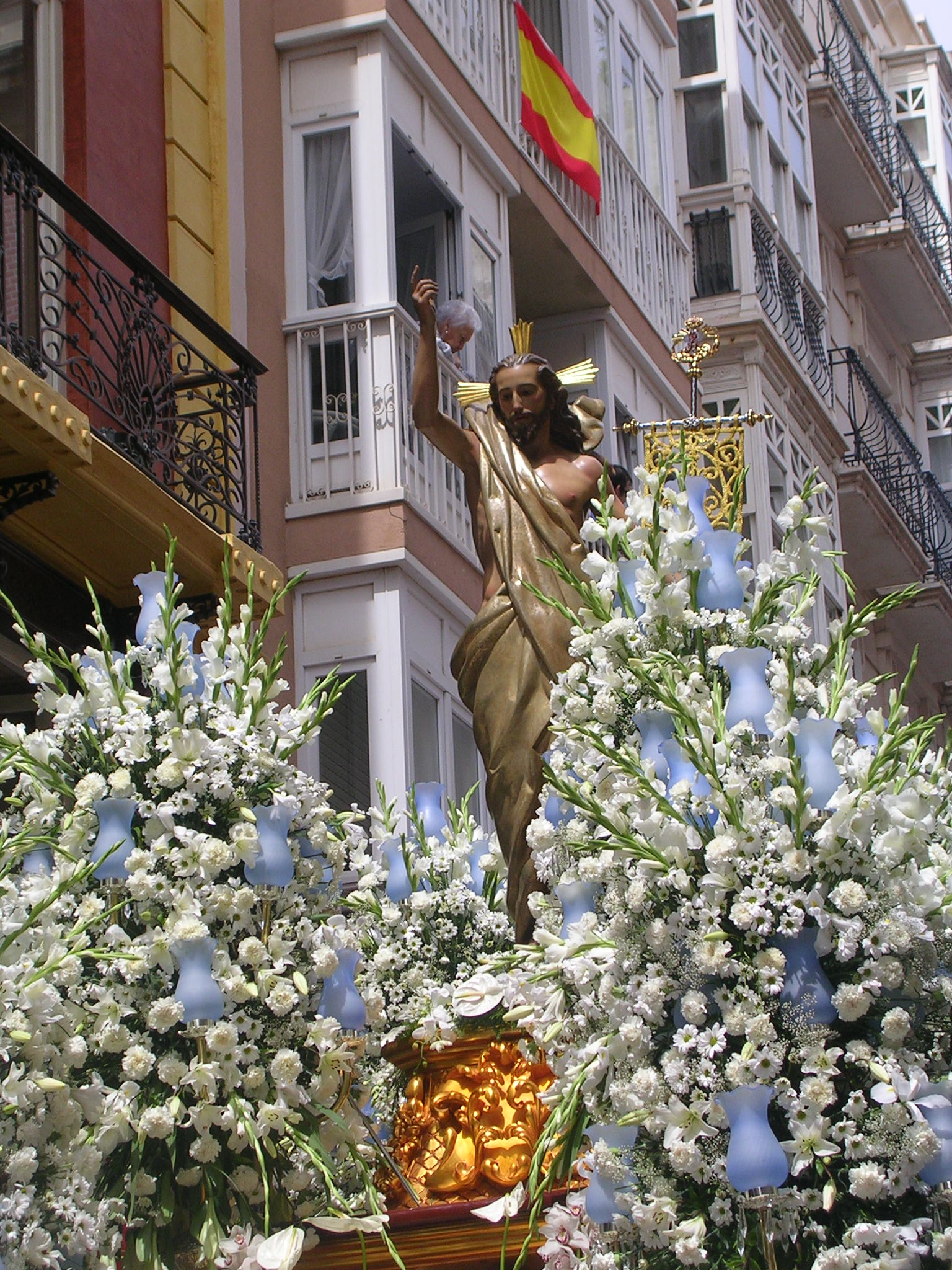
Float of the Risen Christ

The brotherhood of Our Lord Jesus Resurrected (known as Resucitados) organises the procession on the morning of Easter Sunday. The colour of this brotherhood is white. They originally started in 1941 as a section of the Marrajos brotherhood to commemorate Christ's resurrection, but became a separate brotherhood in 1943. The parade has ten floats that tell different parts of the Easter story. Instead of incense used in the other three processions bells are used.

== The Parades ==
Each float is preceded at the front by a richly embroidered standard ("estandarte"), carried by three members of the group and followed by two symmetrical lines of members, who march and stop in unison to the beat of drums. When they stop, they all remain absolutely still and in total silence. Their military-like discipline may have earned their nickname of "tercio", a word which broadly means "regiment".

At the rear of the "tercio" a concert band and the drummers follow, and then the trono made of artistically carved gilded or painted wood. Some of these floats move on wheels whereas others are carried on the shoulders of hundreds of "portapasos" (or float-carriers), who also march to the rhythmic beat of the drums.

Most of the processions are in the evening, or in the day time in holidays, but on the Friday before holy week one of the traditional processions starts at 3.30 AM and goes on to 6. The majority of parades start at the Church of Our Lady of Grace.

== Clothing ==
The members of the group are all clad in the same colours. The men in the floats wear a robe, a sash around the waist, a cloak, a high pointed hood to cover their heads and faces, and sandals.

== Floats ==
"Cartagena style floats" are the name given in other towns to multi-level flats with electric lights, introduced by the Californios and made possible through the money from the region's mining boom at the end of the nineteenth century.

On the top of the float visitors to Cartagena can see the processional images, polychrome wooden sculptures which are displayed either separately or in groups. The images include works by classic artists such as Francisco Salzillo, José Capuz, Juan González Moreno, Mariano Benlliure, or Federico Coullaut-Valera as well as others by contemporary sculptors. Unlike in other cities, in Cartagena the order of the floats in the procession follows the chronological order of the events narrated in the Gospels.

The images are surrounded by "cartelas", a kind of electric candelabra or sometimes a sort of upside-down chandeliers, fixed to the float and decorated with colourful and intricate floral arrangements.

== Piquetes ==
Also unique in Cartagena are the infantry companies ("piquetes") at the rear of the main processions, escorting the float of the Virgin Mary which, under popular Marian advocations such as Our Lady of Sorrows or Our Lady of Solitude, usually close the procession.

== Naval Involvement ==
Given its role as the historical home of the Spanish Navy, every year on Holy Tuesday the Spanish Navy Marines send a delegation to the procession on that day.
