= List of governors of Galicia =

The Governor of Galicia was a representative appointed by the King of Spain, to administer the former Kingdom of Galicia between 1475 and 1834, when the function was abolished.

== Function ==
From 1480, when the first official Governor (Fernando de Acuña) arrived, until 1834, when Galicia was divided into its current four provinces, the region was always governed by a Governor, who was mostly also the Captain General and the President of the Real Audiencia. This accumulation of powers was not merely honorary, since...
the Captains General Presidents of the Royal Audiencia could summon and compel the corregidores, alcaldes mayores, and other judges and ministers of justice to appear, both to instruct them and to correct or admonish them on any point or matter that concerned the Royal Service and the public good. (Real Resolución from 27 November 1773).

This implied a conception of power that could be described as viceregal: therefore the unofficial term Viceroy of Galicia is also sometimes used, by analogy with the Viceroy of Catalonia, Valencia, Navarre or Aragon.

== List of Governors ==
This is a list of Spanish Governors of Galicia (Spain) from 1475 to 1834, when the function was abolished.

1. Enrique Enríquez de Mendoza, Count of Alba de Liste (1475-1477)
2. Pedro de Villandrado, Count of Ribadeo (1477-1480)
3. Fernando de Acuña y de Herrera (1480-1484)
4. Diego López VI de Haro, Lord of Biscay (1484-1498)
5. Hernando de Vega, Lord of Grajal (1498-1505)
6. Fernando Pérez de Guzmán (1505-1507)
7. Diego de Rojas (1507-1510)
8. Diego Hurtado de Mendoza, 2nd Marquis of Cañete (1510-1518)
9. Pedro López de Ayala y Carrillo, 3rd Count of Fuensalida (1518-1522)
10. Antonio de la Cueva y Mendoza (1522-1530), Lord of La Adrada
11. Juan de Granada (1530-1543)
12. Álvaro de Mendoza, Count of Castrogeriz (1543-1548)
13. Pedro de Navarra y de la Cueva, Marquis of Cortes (1548-1553)
14. Diego López de Zúñiga, 4th Count of Nieva (1553-1559)
15. Rodrigo Pacheco, 1st Marquess of Cerralbo (1559-1587)
16. Juan Pacheco, 2nd Marquess of Cerralbo (1587-1594)
17. Diego de las Mariñas (Interim) (1594-1596) (1st term)
18. Luis Carrillo de Toledo, Marquis of Caracena (1596-1606)
19. Diego de las Mariñas (Interim) (1606-1607) (2nd term)
20. Luis de Luján Enríquez (1607-1615)
21. Rodrigo Pacheco Osorio, 3rd Marquis of Cerralbo (1615-1624)
22. Juan Alonso Idiáquez, 2nd Duke of Ciudad Real (Interim) (1624-1625)
23. Diego Sarmiento de Acuña, 1st Count of Gondomar (1625-1626)
24. Juan Fajardo de Guevara, Marquis of Espinardo (1626-1631)
25. Pedro de Toledo, 1st Marquis of Mancera (1631-1638)
26. Francisco González de Andía, Marquis of Valparaíso (1638-1641)
27. Vicente de Gonzaga y Doria (1641) (1st term)
28. Enrique Enríquez Pimentel, Marquis of Távora (1641-1642) (1st term)
29. Martín de Redín (1642-1643)
30. Agustín de Spínola Basadone, Archbishop of Santiago (Interim) (1643)
31. Enrique Pimentel, Marquis of Távora (1643-1645) (2nd term)
32. Guillén Ramón de Moncada y Castro, 4th Marquis of Aytona (1646-1647)
33. Fernando Andrade Sotomayor, Archbishop of Santiago (Interim) (1647)
34. Diego de Benavides, 8th Count of Santisteban (1647-1649)
35. Fernando Andrade Sotomayor, Archbishop of Santiago (1649-1652) (2nd term)
36. Vicente de Gonzaga y Doria (1652-1658) (2nd term)
37. Rodrigo Pimentel Ponce de León, Marquis of Viana del Bollo (1658-1661)
38. Pedro Carrillo y Acuña, Archbishop of Santiago (Interim) (1661-1663)
39. Luis de Poderico (Interim) (1663-1665)
40. Íñigo Melchor de Velasco, 7th Duke of Frías (1665-1667)
41. Diego Antonio Felicio de Croix, 6th Marquis of Falces (1667-1668) (1st term)
42. Pedro Zúñiga Enríquez, 4th Marquis of Aguilafuente (1668)
43. Baltasar de Eraso y Toledo, 2nd Count of Humanes (1668-1670) (1st term)
44. Andrés Girón, Archbishop of Santiago (Interim) (1671-1673)
45. Baltasar de Eraso y Toledo, 2nd Count of Humanes (1673) (2nd term)
46. Pedro Giménez de Urrea, 6th Count of Aranda (1673-1677)
47. Diego Antonio Felicio de Croix, 6th Marquis of Falces (1677) (2nd term)
48. Pedro Manuel Colón de Portugal, 7th Duke of Veragua (1677-1679)
49. Fernando Carrillo y Manuel, 1st Marquis of Villafiel (1679-1680)
50. Juan Arias Pacheco, 6th Count of Puñoenrostro (1680-1681) (1st term)
51. Antonio López de Ayala y Velasco, Count of Fuensalida (1681-1682)
52. Juan Francisco Pacheco, 4th Duke of Uceda (1682-1685)
53. Diego Ros de Medrano, Bishop of Ourense (1686-1687)
54. Juan Arias Pacheco, Count of Puñoenrostro (1687-1692) (2nd term)
55. Luis Fernández Portocarrero, 5th Count of Palma del Rio (1692-1696)
56. Melchor de Guzmán Álvarez Osorio, 12th Marquess of Astorga (1696-1700)
57. Gaspar de Zúñiga Enríquez, Prince of Brabanzón (1700-1703)
58. Domingo Pignatelli y Vagher, 1st Marquis of San Vicente (1700-1703)
59. Fernando de Pignatelli y Brancia, Duke-consort of Hijar (1703-1707)
60. Guillaume de Melun, 3rd Marquis de Richebourg (1707-1722)
61. Claude Abraham de Tubières de Grimoard, 1st Duke of Caylus (1722-1735)
62. Leopoldo Adriano José de Rifflart y Vooght, Count of Ittre (1737-1756)
63. Carlos Francisco de Croix, 1st Marquess of Croix (1756-1766)
64. Maximiliano de la Croix (1766-1770)
65. Francisco Antonio Tineo, 2nd Marquis of Casa Tremañes (1770-1774)
66. Pedro Martín-Paredes Cermeño (1774-1790)
67. Ventura Caro (1790-1793)
68. Francisco Javier Pacheco (1793-1794)
69. Juan José Galcerán de Villalba-Meca y Llorac (1794-1804)
70. Francisco Taranco y Llano (1804-1808)
71. Francisco de Biedma y Zayas (1808-1808)
72. Antonio Filangieri (1808-1808)
73. French occupation (1808-1814)
74. Luis de Lacy (1814-1814)
75. Felipe Augusto de Saint-Marcq (1814-1818)
76. Francisco Javier Venegas (1818-1820)
77. Antonio Quiroga (1822-1823)
78. Nazario Eguía (1824-1832)
79. Francisco Marracedo (1834)

== See also ==
- Xunta of the Kingdom of Galicia (1528—1834)
- List of rulers of Galicia and Lodomeria

== Further Sources ==
- Benjamín González Alonso (1974). Gobernación y gobernadores, notas sobre la administración de Castilla en el período de formación del Estado moderno. Madrid University. p. 61-ff. ISBN 9788460063711.
