= Church of Santo Domingo, Cartagena =

Coordinates: 10.4242°N 75.5524°W

Church of Santo Dominic
- Iglesia de Santo Domingo
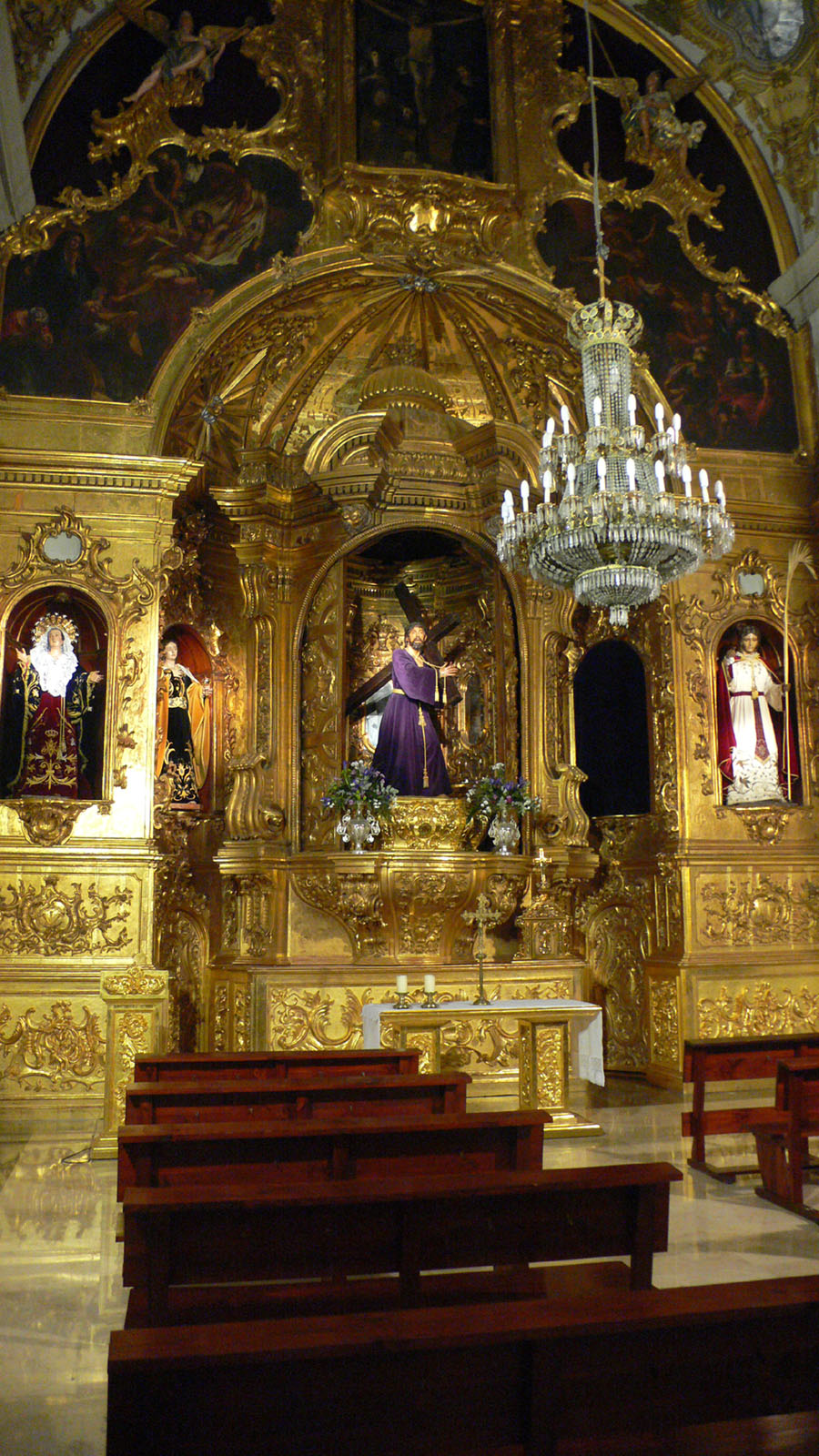
- Chapel of Our Father Jesus the Nazarene
- Church of Santo Dominic
- Location: Cartagena
- Country: Spain
- Denomination: Catholic Church

History
- Founder: Dominicans
- Dedication: Saint Dominic

Architecture
- Style: Baroque, eclecticism

Administration
- Diocese: Military

The Church of Saint Dominic (Spanish Iglesia de Santo Domingo) is a Catholic church located in Cartagena (Region of Murcia) built between the 17th to 19th centuries. It houses the Chapel of the Marrajos.

== History ==
The church was built as an annex to the convent of San Isidoro, which was constructed in 1580 for the mendicant order of the Dominicans.

In 1641, the brotherhood of the Marrajos added a chapel, which they used as their headquarters and the starting point for the Good Friday procession in the Semana Santa parades in Cartagena. The chapel (rebuilt in 1690) has a Bien de Interés Cultural designation.

In the early 19th century, the church was used in 1823 as a stable by French troops during the intervention of the Hundred Thousand Sons of Saint Louis in support of absolutism.

On July 25, 1835, the convent was affected by the royal decree that ordered the suppression of monastic properties. This resolution was part of the upcoming confiscation plan initiated by Juan Álvarez Mendizábal, then Prime Minister of Spain (1836), by which the convent was transferred to private ownership, passing to the Picó family (who built the now-lost Calle Mayor pharmacy), while only the church remained ecclesiastical property.

By 1875, the church was under the protection of the Spanish Navy and the patronage of Saint Ferdinand, although this was later changed to Saint Dominic, who remains its patron to this day. During the Spanish Civil War, it suffered severe damage, preventing the Marrajos from using it for Holy Week.

Over its history, the church has undergone significant renovations and restorations, the most recent in 1973, which affected the entire building. Today, it is fully functional and operates under the Military Archbishopric.

== Architecture ==
The church consists of a rectangular nave with brick walls and two large chapels on the Epistle side: the Marrajos' chapel and that of the former Rosary brotherhood.

The triumphal arch separating the chancel from the rest of the nave is a round arch, a style that predominates in the rest of the arches and chapels, which also include lowered and stilted arches. The central nave has a barrel vault, as does the main chapel. At the back are the choir and the bell tower, which has a single structure and two openings.

The most notable part of the church is the Marraja chapel, built in 1690 and renovated in the 18th century, with a square plan and a dome raised on richly decorated pendentives with mouldings and stucco in white and cream tones. It also contains a beautiful 18th-century altarpiece made of polychrome wood, showcasing several sculptures of the brotherhood, especially works by the Valencian sculptor José Capuz.
