= Claude Abraham de Tubières de Grimoard de Pestel de Lévis, duc de Caylus =

French military leader (c. 1672-1759)

Claude Abraham de Tubières de Grimoard de Pestel de Lévis (c. 1672 - 1759) was a French military leader.

Born in Auvergne, he was the third son of the Henry de Tubières - Grimoard and Claude Fabert, daughter of Abraham II de Fabert, a Marshal of the Kingdom of France.

He was Lieutenant General of the Spanish Army in 1707, military governor at Extremadura, military governor at Zaragoza in 1718, military Governor of Galicia between 1722 and 1735, Captain General of Valencia, Captain General of the Royal Armies in 1734. He was promoted in 1716 to be a knight of the Order of the Golden Fleece.

In 1742, after serving for 35 years the interests of Spain, he received to the title of Duke of Caylus and of Grandee of Spain by King Philip V of Spain.
