= Francisco Solano, 2nd Marquis de Socorro =

Spanish military officer (1768–1808)

Francisco Solano
- Born: 10 October 1768; Caracas
- Died: 29 May 1808 (aged 39); Cadiz
- Military career
- Rank: Lieutenant general
- Conflicts: War of the Pyrenees; War of the Oranges; Invasion of Portugal (1807)

Francisco María Solano Ortiz de Rozas (10 October 1768 (Note: There is some discrepancy regarding his date of birth. The date given here is from his service records. However, according to Spanish historian Adolfo de Castro, it was 10 December 1769. (Macía & Brocos)) – 29 May 1808), 2nd Marquis de Socorro and 6th Marquis de la Solana, was a Spanish military officer.

Solano was one of the three captains-general slain by the Spanish population following the Madrid Uprising (2 May 1808), the two others being Filanghieri in Galicia and Count Torre del Fresno in Estremadura.

== Early career ==
Solano was promoted to captain of Cavalry in June 1784. He saw action in Spanish America and in two campaigns in Oran. He was promoted to colonel in April 1792. He saw further action in the War of the Pyrenees (1793–July 1795) and in the War of the Oranges (1801).

In October 1802, Solano was promoted to lieutenant general and in November 1805 he was appointed military governor of Cádiz, where he set up free schools based on the methods of the Swiss pedagogue and educational reformer Johann Heinrich Pestalozzi.

== Peninsular War ==
In 1807, following the signing of the Treaty of Fontainebleau, allowing for the invasion of Portugal, Solano led one of the three auxiliary Spanish corps that aided General Junot's Army of the Gironde in invading that country. Setting out from Badajoz with 9,500 troops, Solano was to take the garrison town of Elvas and then march on Lisbon along the left bank of the Tagus. However, Solano did not enter Portugal until 2 December, three days after Junot had entered Lisbon.

Following the Madrid Uprising (2 May 1808), Solano was killed on 27 May by an angry mob that suspected him of collaborating with the French, especially with the French fleet moored in the Bay of Cadiz. Escaping an initial attempt on his life, he took refuge at a friend's house, from which he was captured and led to an improvised gallows. On the way there, he was stabbed to death.
