= Juan Francisco Pacheco y Téllez-Girón, 4th Consort Duke of Uceda =

Spanish noble, viceroy of Sicily and ambassador

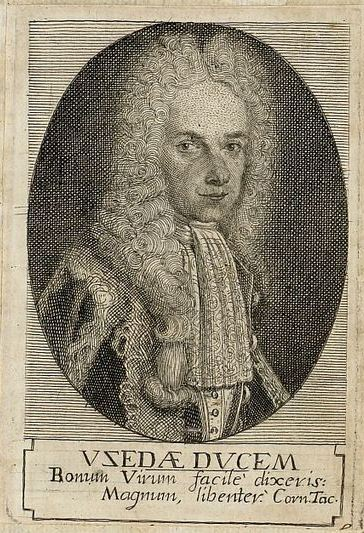
Juan Francisco Pacheco y Téllez-Girón

Juan Francisco Pacheco y Téllez-Girón, 4th Consort Duke of Uceda, (Madrid, Spain, 8 June 1649 – Vienna, Austria, 25 August 1718), was a Spanish noble, viceroy of Sicily and Spanish Ambassador in Rome.

== Biography ==
He was the son of Alonso Melchor Téllez-Girón, from whom he inherited the title of 3rd Count of La Puebla de Montalban, and Juana de Velasco, daughter of Bernardino Fernández de Velasco, 6th Duke of Frías.

He was Governor and Captain General of Galicia (1682–1686), Spanish Viceroy of Sicily (1689–1696) under king Charles II of Spain, Ambassador at Rome, Italy, under kings Charles II of Spain and Philip V of Spain, member of the Spanish State Council under king Philip V of Spain. He was also 1st Marquis of Menas Albas, Marquis of Belmonte, Chevalier of the French Order of the Holy Spirit and Grandee of Spain.

During his time as the Spanish Viceroy of Sicily he experienced the 1693 Sicily earthquake and launched several naval attacks on Alger, Tunis and Istanbul, which resulted in a decrease of the number of Ottoman raids on Sicily.

During the War of the Spanish Succession he first supported Philip V of Spain, but went over to the Austrians in 1710, and lived the last years of his life in Vienna.

He became there Knight of the Order of the Golden Fleece, Austrian Branch, and member of the Austrian Empire State Council of Charles VI, Holy Roman Emperor.

He married on 16 July 1677 with Isabel María de Sandoval y Girón, a Grandee of Spain, 4th proprietary Duchess of Uceda, (born Madrid, Spain, 15 August 1653 – married 16 July 1677 - +Genoa, Italy, 23 July 1711).

Through this marriage Juan became jure uxoris, 4th Consort Duke of Uceda.

== On the title Duke of Uceda ==
His wife, Duchess Isabel María de Sandoval y Girón, followed a naming tradition used by women of the High Spanish Nobility and ecclesiastical officials from noble families since the mid-14th century. This tradition involved using the maternal surname when the mother held a noble title. Her mother, Feliche de Sandoval Ursino (or Orsini) (Madrid, Spain, June 3, 1625 – Milan, Italy, October 7, 1671), was the 3rd Duchess of Uceda and a Grandee of Spain. After marrying in 1645, her husband, Gaspar Téllez-Girón y Sandoval (Madrid, May 25, 1625 – June 2, 1694), became the 3rd Duke Consort of Uceda. However, he was primarily known by his paternal title as the 5th Duke of Osuna.

In short, the 3rd and 4th Dukes of Uceda were women—Feliche de Sandoval and Isabel María de Sandoval—who inherited and held the title in their own right. Their fathers and husbands, however, bore different noble titles from their respective families: Álvarez de Toledo (8th Count of Oropesa) Pacheco Téllez-Girón (3rd Count of La Puebla de Montalbán) Téllez-Girón y Sandoval (5th Duke of Osuna).

It is through this elaborate but by no means at the time uncommon, "family names engineering" that it was possible to pass on the family name "Sandoval" from Francisco Gómez de Sandoval, 1st Duke of Lerma, (PM of Spain under earlier king Philip III of Spain to their son:

Manuel de Sandoval Téllez-Girón, 5th Duke of Uceda, (Madrid, Spain 11 April 1676 – Madrid, Spain, 12 November 1732).

Government offices
Preceded by Count of Fuensalida	Governor of Galicia; 1682–1685	Succeeded by Diego Ros de Medrano
Preceded by Francisco de Benavides	Viceroy of Sicily; 1687–1696	Succeeded by Pedro Manuel Colón de Portugal
