= Vicente de Gonzaga y Doria =

Spanish viceroy

Vicente de Gonzaga y Doria (1602 – 23 November 1694) was Governor of Galicia, 1652-1658, Viceroy of Valencia, 1663, Viceroy of Catalonia, 1664–1667 and Viceroy of Sicily, 1678.

== Biography ==
He was the second of the 11 sons/daughters of Ferrante II Gonzaga, 1st Duke of Guastalla, (1563 – 5 August 1630), married in 1587 to Donna Vittoria Doria dei Principi di Melfi, (1569–1618), daughter of Genoese Admiral of the Spanish Fleet and Member of the Spanish Royal Council, Giovanni Andrea Doria, Prince of Melfi.

Vicente's eldest brother was Cesare II Gonzaga, Duke of Guastalla.

Another sister, Zenobia de Gonzaga y Doria, (*1588 – +1618) married in 1607 don Giovanni Tagliavia d'Aragona, Duke of Terranova, a title awarded to Gonzalo Fernández de Córdoba in the year 1502, from a powerful Aragonese-Sicilian family, linked to the Princes of Castelvetrano, a Sicilian town, located at 37°41′0″N 12°47′35″E.
