= Toribio Gragera de Vargas =

Spanish military officer

Toribio Gragera de Vargas y Argüello, 3rd Count of Torre del Fresno (1756–1808) was a Spanish field marshal, military governor and captain general of Extremadura.

The Count of Torre del Fresno was one of the three captains-general slain by a mob following the Madrid Uprising (2 May 1808), the two others being Filanghieri in Galicia and Solano in Cádiz.

In 1767, he had enlisted as an under-age cadet in the Volunteer Cavalry Regiment of Spain. In 1792, he was promoted to colonel in the Provisional Regiment of Trujillo, and in 1794, he was promoted to lieutenant colonel of the Infantry Regiment of Extremadura, taking over the command from Cuesta.

During the War of the Pyrenees, he saw action at Sant Llorenç de la Muga (August 1794) and at Black Mountain (November 1794). At the end of the war he was promoted to Infantry brigadier.

In 1801, he fought in the War of the Oranges, participating at the siege of Campo Maior, and was promoted to field marshal in 1802.

In July 1807, he was appointed military governor of Badajoz, although he did not take up the post until the following September, as he was appointed interim captain general of Extremadura when General Juan Carrafa headed for Portugal at the head of one of the three Spanish columns sent to assist Junot.

Although, on receiving news of the Dos de Mayo Uprising in Madrid (1808), he had already emitted a declaration against the French forces the following 5 May, the Count was killed by an angry mob at the end of that same month.
