= Francisco de Biedma y Zayas =

Spanish military commander

Francisco Biedma y Zayas (18th century – 19th century, fl. 1808) was a Spanish military officer and, briefly, Governor and Captain-General of Galicia, as well as the President of the Real Audiencia of Galicia.

Following the death, in early 1808, of the previous captain-general, Francisco Taranco y Llano, at his recently established headquarters in Porto, then-Field Marshal Biedma y Zayas was appointed acting Captain-General of Galicia, and confirmed in the post on 11 May 1808. His tenure would, however, be brief, as the uprising that month would bring about a total upheaval of the country.

Biedma publicly favoured the entry of French troops into Galicia, expressing his wish that they be welcomed there and denounced the uprising in Madrid. Although he was replaced as Captain-General of Galicia by Antonio Filangieri on 29 May, (Note: Filangieri would himself shortly thereafter be replaced as captain-general by Joaquín Blake.) Biedma was allowed to continue in his political and administrative role as governor.
