= Antonio López de Ayala y Velasco, Count of Fuensalida =

Spanish noble and politician

Antonio López de Ayala Velasco y Cardeñas (?–1709) was a Spanish noble and politician. He was Count of Fuensalida and Colmenar, and Grande of Spain. He was successively viceroy of Navarra, Governor of Galicia, Viceroy of Sardinia and Governor of the Duchy of Milan.

== Sources ==
- Real Academia de la Historia
- Árboles de costados de gran parte de las primeras casas de estos reynos, Luis de Salazar y Castro.
- Monarquía española, blasón de su nobleza, Juan Felix Francisco de Rivarola y Pineda, vol. II, pág. 424.

Government offices
Preceded by Alexander Farnese, Prince of Parma	Viceroy of Navarre; 1676–1681	Succeeded by Íñigo de Velandia Arce y Arellano
Preceded by Count of Puñoenrostro	Governor of Galicia; 1681–1682	Succeeded by Duke of Uceda
Preceded by Diego Ventura, Archbishop of Cagliari	Viceroy of Sardinia; 1682–1686	Succeeded by José Delitala y Castelví
Preceded by Juan Henríquez de Cabrera, Count of Melgar	Governor of the Duchy of Milan; 1686–1691	Succeeded by Diego Dávila Mesía y Guzmán, 3rd Marquis of Leganés
