= Pedro Manuel Colón de Portugal =

Spanish noble

Pedro Manuel Colón de Portugal y de la Cueva, 7th Duke of Veragua, (25 December 1651 – 9 September 1710) was a Spanish noble.

He was a Knight of the Order of the Golden Fleece since 1675, Governor of Galicia (1677-1679), Viceroy of Valencia, 1679–1680, Viceroy of Sicily, 1696–1701, and Viceroy of Sardinia, 1706–1708.

He was born in Madrid, the eldest son of Pedro Nuño Colón de Portugal, 6th Duke of Veragua and 5th Duke of la Vega, a descendant of the House of Braganza, and his first wife, Isabel Fernández de la Cueva y Enríquez de Cabrera, daughter of Francisco Fernández de la Cueva, 7th Duke of Alburquerque.

Pedro Manuel married Teresa Marina de Ayala, 4th Marchioness de la Mota, in Madrid on 30 August 1674.

He was also Lord Admiral of the Spanish Fleet in Cartagena and while he was there founded the Socorro brotherhood which participate in the Semana Santa processions in Cartagena.

Their eldest son, Pedro Manuel Nuño Colón de Portugal y Ayala, succeeded the dukedom in 1710. After his death in 1733, his sister Catalina Ventura became 9th Duchess of Veragua, and afterwards the dukedom passed down through her marriage with James Fitz-James Stuart, 2nd Duke of Berwick and their descendants.

Government offices
Preceded by Juan Francisco Pacheco y Téllez-Girón, 4th Consort Duke of Uceda	Viceroy of Sicily; 1696–1701	Succeeded by Juan Manuel Fernández Pacheco, 8th Marquis of Villena
