= Leander of Seville =

Bishop of Seville

Saint Leander of Seville
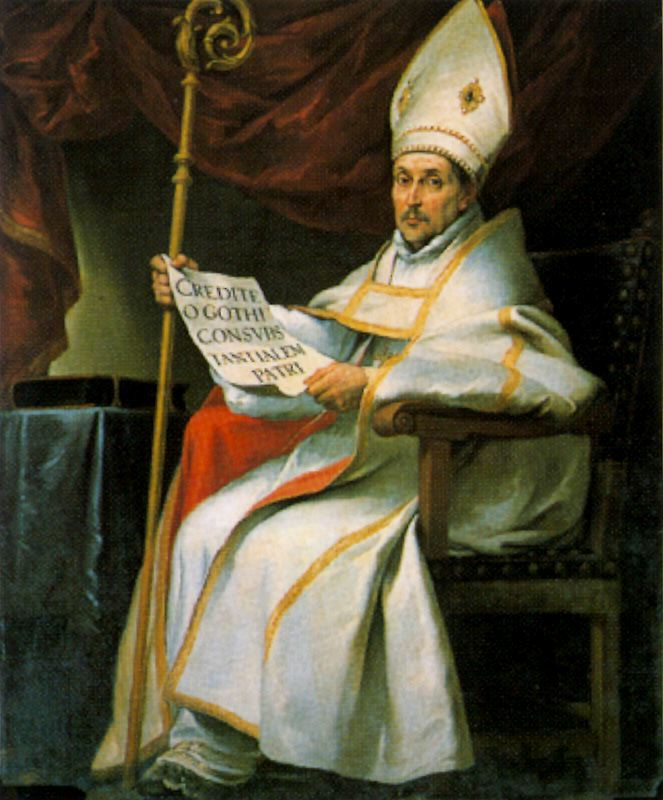
- San Leandro by Bartolomé Esteban Perez Murillo

Bishop and Confessor Apostle of the Visigoths
- Born: c. 534; Carthago Spartaria, Spania, Eastern Roman Empire
- Died: 13 March 600 or 601; Hispalis, Visigothic Kingdom
- Venerated in: Catholic Church; Eastern Orthodox Church
- Feast: 27 February (Eastern Orthodox; Catholic Vetus Ordo); 13 March (Eastern Orthodox; Catholic Novus Ordo; Mozarabic Rite); 13 November (in Spain)
- Attributes: episcopal attire

Leander of Seville (Spanish: Leandro de Sevilla; Latin: Leandrus; c. 534 AD – 13 March 600 or 601) was a Hispano-Roman Catholic prelate who served as Bishop of Seville. He was instrumental in effecting the conversion of the Visigothic kings Hermenegild and Reccared to Catholicism. His brother (and successor as bishop) was the encyclopedist Isidore of Seville.

== Life ==
Leander, Isidore and their siblings belonged to an elite family of Hispano-Roman stock of Carthago Spartaria (Cartagena). Their father Severianus is claimed to have been a dux or governor of Carthago Spartaria, according to their hagiographers, though this seems more of a fanciful interpretation since Isidore simply states that he was a citizen. The family as a matter of course were staunch Catholics, as were most of the Romanized population; the Visigothic nobles and the kings were Arians.

The family moved to Seville around 554. The children's subsequent public careers reflect their distinguished origin: Leander and Isidore both became bishops of Hispalis (Seville), and their sister Florentina was an abbess who directed forty convents and one thousand nuns. The third brother, Fulgentius, was appointed Bishop of Astigi (Ecjia). All four siblings are considered saints of the Catholic and Eastern Orthodox Churches.

The Catholic hierarchy were in contact with representatives of the Eastern Roman or Byzantine emperor, who had maintained a considerable territory in the far south of Hispania ever since his predecessor had been invited to the peninsula by king Athanagild several decades before. In the north, Liuvigild struggled to maintain his possessions on the far side of the Pyrenees, where his Merovingian cousins and brothers-in-law cast envious eyes on them.

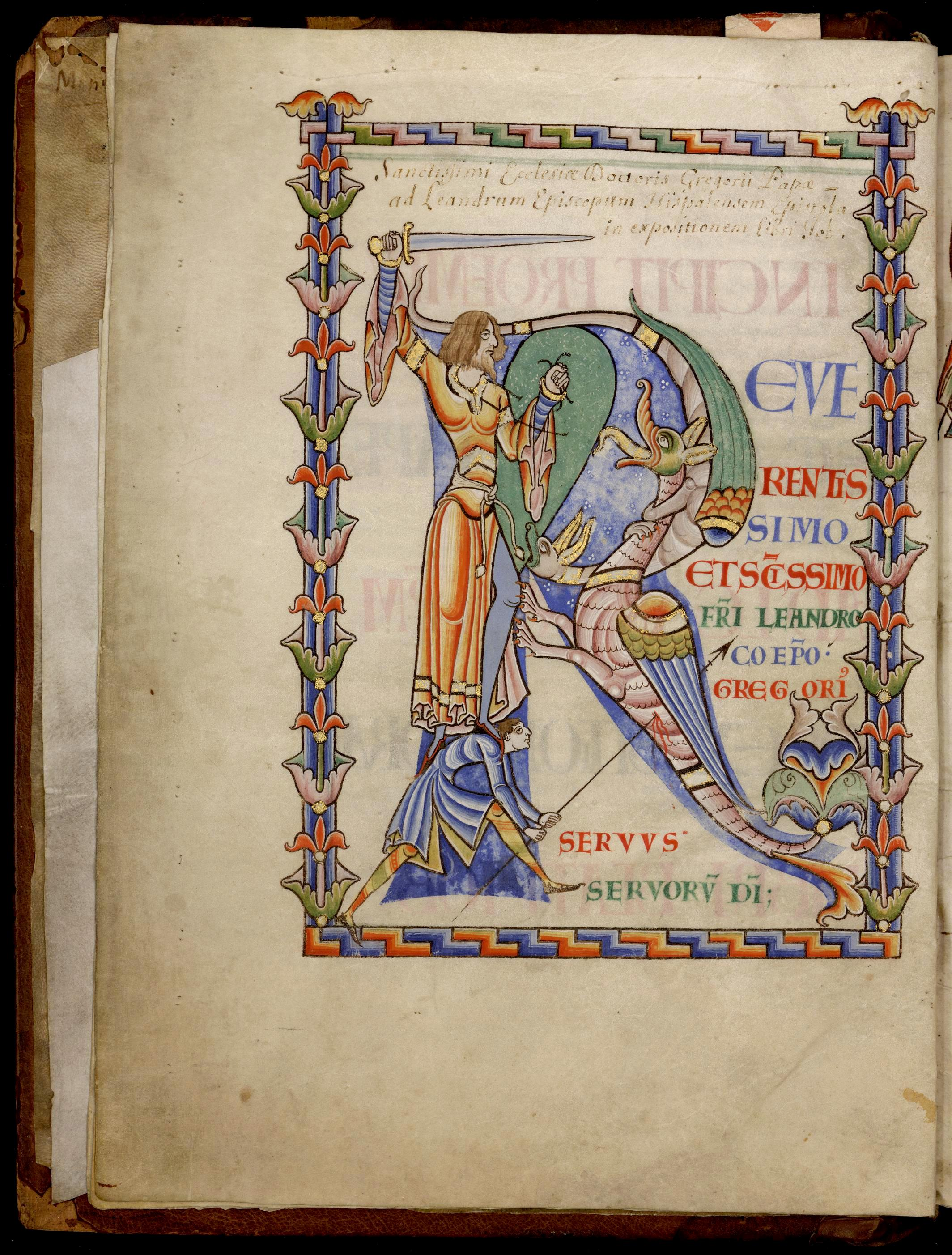
Illumination in a 12th-century manuscript of a letter from Pope Gregory I to Leander (Dijon municipal library)

Leander, enjoying an elite position in the secure surroundings of tolerated Catholic culture in Seville, became, around 576, a Benedictine monk, and then in 579 he was appointed bishop of Seville. In the meantime he founded a celebrated school, which soon became a center of Catholic learning. As bishop he had access to the Catholic Merovingian princess Ingunthis, who had come as a bride for the kingdom's heir, and he assisted her to convert her husband Hermenegild, the eldest son of Liuvigild, an act that cannot honestly be divorced from a political context. Leander defended the new convert even when he went to war with his father "against his father's cruel reprisals". Pierre Suau puts it, "In endeavoring to save his country from Arianism, Leander showed himself an orthodox Christian and a far-sighted patriot."

Exiled by Liuvigild, as his biographies express it, when the rebellion failed, he withdrew to Byzantium – perhaps quite hastily – from 579 to 582. It is possible, but not proven, that he sought to rouse the Byzantine Emperor Tiberius II Constantine to take up arms against the Arian king; but in any case the attempt was without result. He profited, however, by his stay at Byzantium to compose works against Arianism, and there became acquainted with the future Pope Gregory the Great, at that time legate of Pope Pelagius II at the Byzantine court (Later Gregory sent him a copy of Pastoral Care). A close friendship thenceforth united the two men, and some of their correspondence survives. In 585 Liuvigild put to death his intransigent son Hermenegild, a martyr and saint of the Catholic and Eastern Orthodox Churches. Liuvigild himself died in 589. It is not known exactly when Leander returned from exile, but he had a share in the conversion of Reccared the heir of Liuvigild, and retained an influence over him.

Leander introduced the recitation of the Nicene Creed at Mass, as a way to help reinforce the faith of his people against Arianism. In 589, he convoked the Third Council of Toledo, where Visigothic Hispania abjured Arianism. Leander delivered the triumphant closing sermon which his brother Isidore entitled Homilia de triumpho ecclesiae ob conversionem Gothorum ("a homily upon the triumph of the Church and the conversion of the Goths"). On his return from this council, Leander convened a synod in his metropolitan city of Seville (Conc. Hisp., I), and never afterwards ceased his efforts to consolidate the work of extirpating the remains of Arianism, in which his brother and successor St. Isidore was to follow him.

== Works ==
Only two works remain of this writer: De institutione virginum et contemptu mundi (a monastic rule composed for his sister) and Homilia de triumpho ecclesiæ ob conversionem Gothorum (P.L, LXXII). St. Isidore wrote of his brother: "This man of suave eloquence and eminent talent shone as brightly by his virtues as by his doctrine. By his faith and zeal the Gothic people have been converted from Arianism to the Catholic faith" (De script. eccles., xxviii).

== Legacy ==
The city of San Leandro in the US state of California is named after St. Leander. His supposed likeness and crosier is depicted on the crest of Sevilla Fútbol Club.

The Catholic and Eastern Orthodox Churches recognise feast days for Leander on both 27 February and 13 March for observance in particular circumstances. In the Spanish national liturgical calendar, the feast day is commemorated on 13 November.

== See also ==
- List of Catholic saints
- Saint Leander of Seville, patron saint archive
