= Saint Florentina =

Christian female saint (died around 612)

Saint Florentina of Cartagena
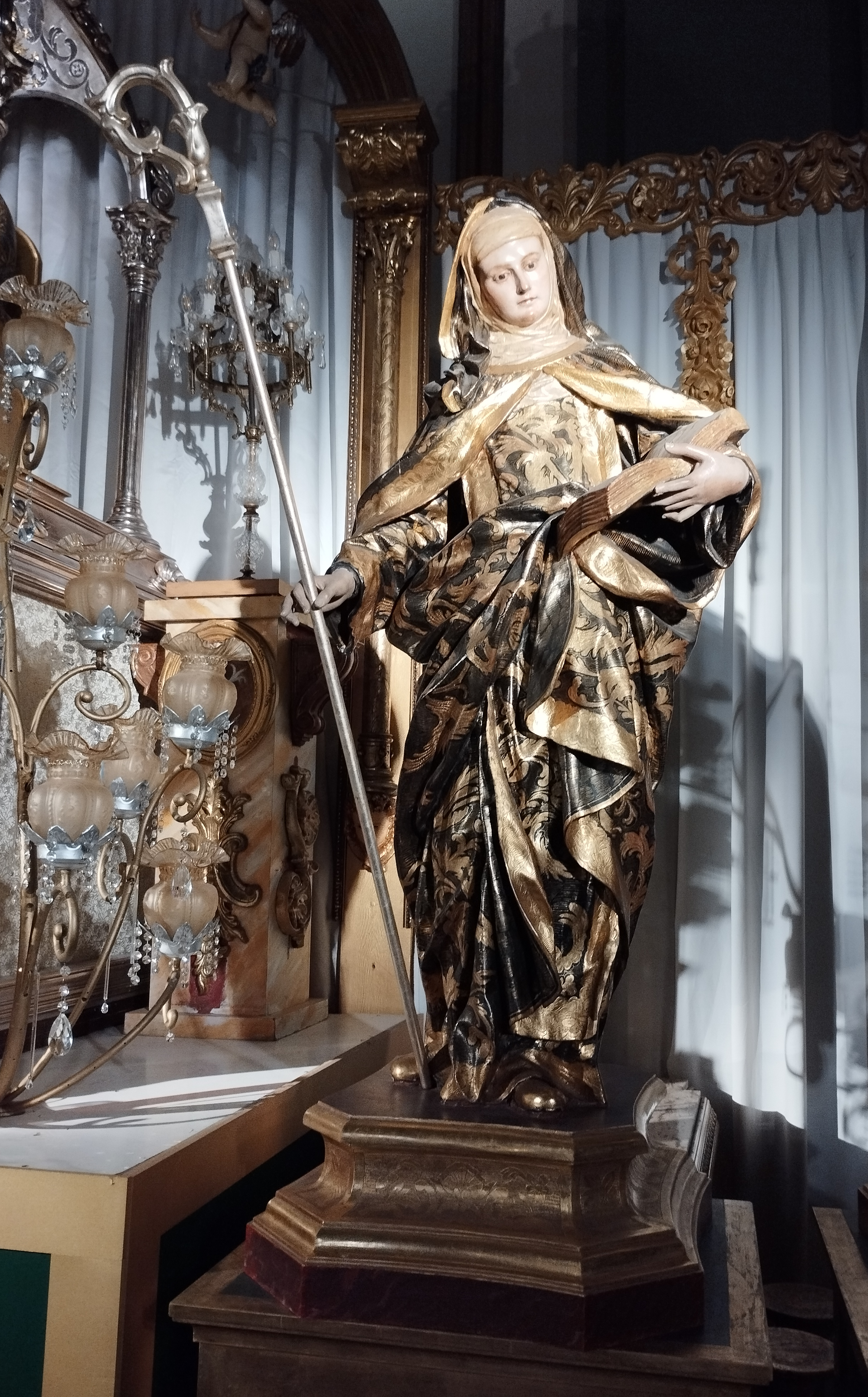
- Statue from the church of Santa María de Gracia in Cartagena, Spain.
- Born: Cartagena, Hispania
- Died: ca. 612
- Venerated in: Catholic Church; Eastern Orthodox Church
- Canonized: Pre-Congregation
- Feast: 28 Aug

Florentina of Cartagena (died ca. 612) is venerated as a saint by the Catholic Church. Born towards the middle of the sixth century in Cartagena, Hispania, she and her family were actively engaged in furthering the best interests of Christianity.

Florentina was the sister of three Iberian bishops in the time of the Visigothic dominion (Leander, Isidore of Seville, and Fulgentius). She was younger than her brother Leander, later Archbishop of Seville, but older than Isidore, who succeeded Leander as archbishop of the same see. All four have been canonized by the Catholic Church.

Losing their parents at an early age, she was placed under the guardianship of her brother, Leander, who had since taken monastic vows, and it was through his influence that Florentina embraced the ascetic life. She associated with herself a number of virgins, who also desired to forsake the world, and formed them into a religious community. Later sources declare their residence to have been the convent of S. Maria de Valle near Ecija (Astigis), of which city her brother Fulgentius was bishop. She later became abbess of the community.

Sometime before the year 600, her brother Leander, who died either in the year 600 or 601, wrote for her guidance an extant work dealing with a nun's rule of life and with contempt for the world. In it the author lays down the rules according to which cloistered consecrated virgins should regulate their lives. He strongly advises them to avoid interaction with women living in the world, and with men, especially youths; recommends strict temperance in eating and drinking, gives advice concerning the reading of and meditation on Holy Scripture, enjoins equal love and friendship for all those living together in community, and exhorts his sister earnestly to remain true to her holy state.

Florentina regulated her life according to the advice of her brother, entered with fervour into the spirit of the religious life, and was honoured as a saint after her death. She died sometime early in the seventh century.

== Veneration ==
Florentina is venerated as the patroness of the diocese of Plasencia. Her feast falls on 20 June. The name is written Florentia in the Roman martyrology, but Florentina is without doubt the correct form.

An part of her bones were buried in the cathedral of Murcia (Spain), where they continue to be venerated. However, most of her remains are preserved in Berzocana (Spain), where she is venerated as well as her brother Fulgentius.
