= Fulgentius of Cartagena =

Saint Fulgentius of Cartagena
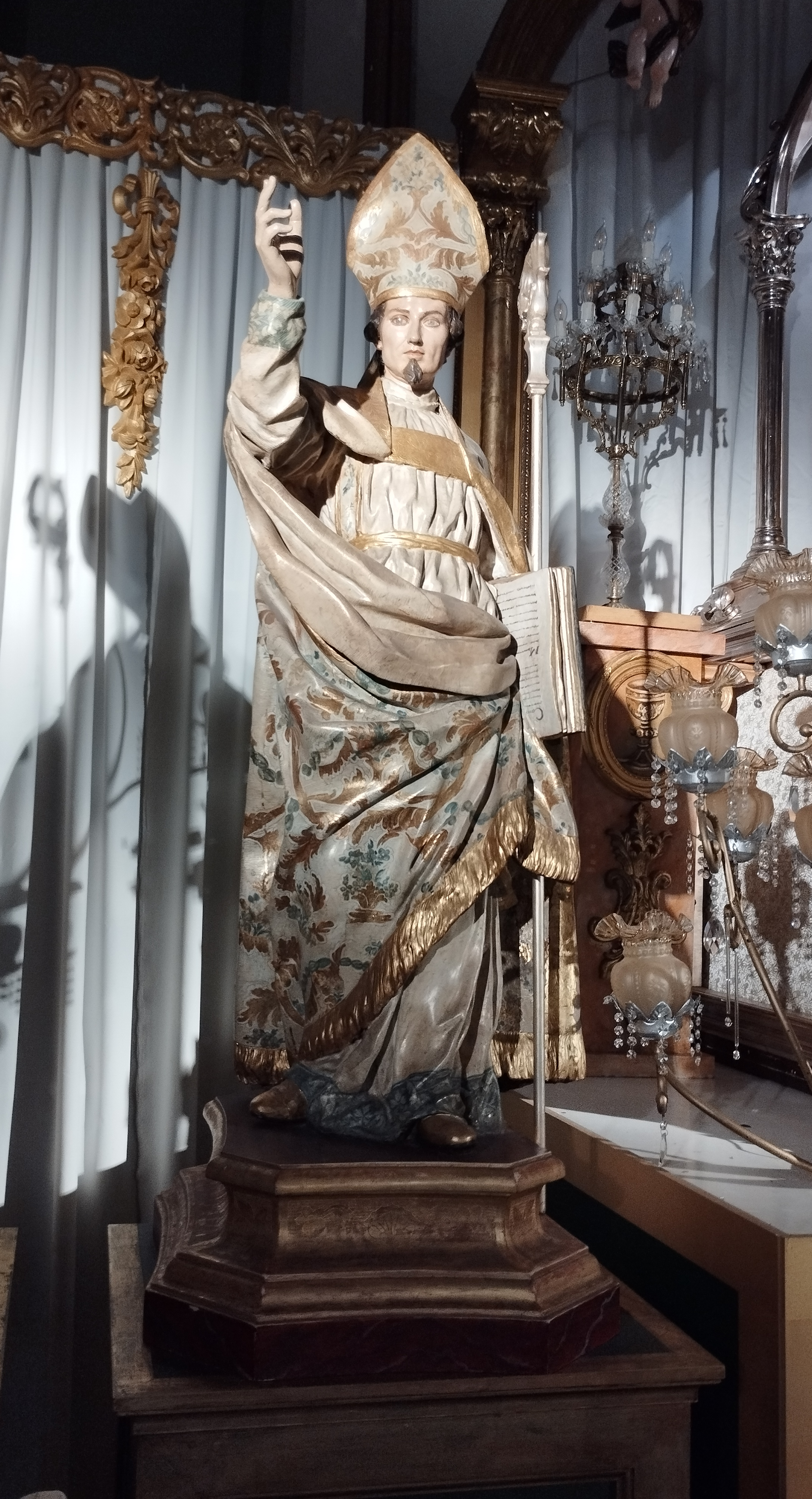
- Image of Saint Fulgentius in the major church of Cartagena. Sculpture by Francisco Salzillo. 18th century.
- Born: 6th century Cartagena, Hispania
- Died: c. 630; Astigi, Hispania
- Venerated in: Roman Catholic Church; Eastern Orthodox Church
- Feast: 14 January

Fulgentius of Cartagena (Spanish: San Fulgencio de Cartagena), born in Cartagena in the 6th century and died in 630, was Bishop of Ecija (Astigi), in Hispania (the Iberian Peninsula, comprising modern Spain and Portugal).

== Biography ==
He was the brother of Saint Florentina as well as Leander of Seville and Isidore of Seville, two Archbishops of Seville (of whom the first was older and the second younger than Fulgentius). Their father Severianus lived at first in Cartagena. He was a Roman and (according to later though doubtful information) an imperial prefect.

Exact data regarding the life of Fulgentius are wanting, as he is mentioned only occasionally in contemporary sources. Leander, in his "Libellus" on the religious life written for his sister Florentina states that he has sent Fulgentius back to his native town of Cartagena, which he now regrets as he fears that harm may befall him, and he requests Florentina to pray for him. Probably through the influence of Leander, who was made Archbishop of Seville in the year 584 and who played an important part in the affairs of the Visigothic Kingdom, Fulgentius became Bishop of Astigi (Ecija), in the ecclesiastical province of Seville. As Leander died in 600 and Pegasius is shown to have still been Bishop of Ecija in 590, Fulgentius would have been chosen bishop between 590 and 600.

In 610 he signed the decree of the King Gundemaro (610-614) which established the province of Toledo by separating territory from that of Cartagena, then under the rule of the Byzantines.

Isidore, who succeeded to the Archbishopric of Seville upon the death of his brother Leander, dedicated to Fulgentius "his lord, the servant of God", his work on the offices of the church, "De ecclesiasticis officiis". In fact it was at the solicitation of Fulgentius that he wrote this account of the origin and authors of the Liturgy.

At the Second Synod of Seville (619), for which Isidore had assembled the bishops of the province of Baetica, a controversy between the Bishop of Astigi and the Bishop of Córdoba regarding a church which was claimed by each as belonging to a parish in his diocese was brought up for settlement. a commission was appointed, and based on arguments taken from Roman law, it was declared that thirty year's undisturbed possession should constitute a legal title. Fulgentius attended the synod in person, his name being found among the signatures to the Acts of the council.

Fulgentius died sometime before the year 633, as one Marcianus is shown to have then been Bishop of Astigi.

== Veneration ==
Fulgentius, like his sister and brothers, was reverenced as a saint. In Hispania his feast was celebrated on different days; in the "Acta Sanctorum" of the Bollandists it is on 14 January.

He is frequently confused in medieval writings with Fulgentius of Ruspe; some works have also been attributed to him, of which, however, no traces remain.

It is said that long after their deaths, a part of the bones of Fulgentius and those of his sister, Florentina, were carried for safety into the Sierra de Guadalupe, and that in the fourteenth century they were found in the village of Berzocana in those mountains. The other part of their bones are in the Cathedral of Murcia in Cartagena, where Fulgentius is venerated as the patron of the diocese.
