= Grimaldi =

Grimaldi may refer to:

== Rulers of Monaco ==
- House of Grimaldi, the princely family of Monaco
  - List of Grimaldi family members

== People ==
- Alberto Grimaldi (1925–2021), Italian film producer
- Alda Grimaldi (1919–2023), Italian director and actress
- Anna Grimaldi (born 1997), New Zealand athlete
- Bernardino Grimaldi (1837–1897), Italian politician
- Carol Grimaldi (1938–2014), American restaurateur
- Dan Grimaldi (born 1946), Italian-American actor
- David Grimaldi (entomologist) (born 1957), American entomologist and curator
- David Grimaldi (politician) (born 1978), American politician
- David Grimaldi (soccer) (born 1954), retired American soccer defender
- Edevaldo Grimaldi (born 1984), Italian footballer
- Eva Grimaldi (born 1961), Italian actress and model
- Francesco Maria Grimaldi (1618–1663), Italian mathematician and physicist
- Giovanni Francesco Grimaldi (1606–1680), Italian architect and painter
- Jerónimo Grimaldi, 1st Duke of Grimaldi (1720–1789), Italian-Spanish politician
- Joseph Grimaldi (1778–1837), English clown
- Laura Grimaldi (1928–2012), Italian writer, journalist and translator
- Martina Grimaldi (born 1988), Italian swimmer
- Nicolò Grimaldi (1673–1732), Italian operatic singer
- Ralph Grimaldi (born 1943), American mathematician
- Rocco Grimaldi (born 1993), American hockey player
- Salvatore Grimaldi (born 1945), Swedish businessman of Italian origin

== Arts and media ==
- Grimaldi (play), an 1855 play based on the life of Joseph Grimaldi by Irish writer Dion Boucicault
- Grimaldi (film), a 1914 British silent film adaptation of the play directed by Charles E. Vernon

== Characters ==
- Amelia Grimaldi, a character in Giuseppe Verdi's opera Simon Boccanegra
- Amelia Mignonette Grimaldi Thermopolis Renaldo (Mia Thermopolis), the main character of The Princess Diaries book series
- Damian Grimaldi, a character on the CBS daytime drama As the World Turns
- Giovanni and Eduardo Grimaldi, characters in the novel Never Say Die by Anthony Horowitz
- Lisa Grimaldi, a character in the soap opera As the World Turns
- Louis Grimaldi, a character in the television series Gossip Girl
- Luciano Eduardo Grimaldi, a character in the soap opera As the World Turns
- Vincent Grimaldi, a character in the Michael Connelly's crime novel Void Moon

== Companies ==
- Grimaldi Group, a shipping company
- Grimaldi Industri AB, a Swedish holding company
- Grimaldi's Pizzeria, a pizzeria chain, based in New York City

== Places ==
- Grimaldi, Calabria, a comune in the Province of Cosenza, Italy
- Grimaldi (Ventimiglia), a town near Ventimiglia, Italy
- Villa Grimaldi, a former detention and torture center of Chile's secret police DINA

== Other uses ==
- Grimaldi (crater), a crater on the Moon
- Grimaldi Man, name given to an Italian find of two paleolithic skeletons
- Grimaldi Ministry, a Spanish government that existed between 1763 and 1777
- Grimaldi, part of the 1981 animated film Heavy Metal

== See also ==
- Grimaldo (disambiguation)
- Grimoald (disambiguation)
