= Grimald =

Grimald or Grimaldus may refer to:

- Grimald of Weissenburg (died 872), Frankish monk and chancellor
- Grimaldus Aemilianensis (fl. c. 1100), Spanish hagiographer
- Nicholas Grimald (1519–1562), English poet and dramatist

== See also ==
- Grimaldo (disambiguation)
- Grimoald (disambiguation)
