= David Grimaldi =

David Grimaldi may refer to:

- David Grimaldi (entomologist) (born 1957), American entomologist and curator
- David Grimaldi (soccer) (born 1954), retired American soccer defender
- David Grimaldi (politician) (born 1978), American businessman and politician
