= Felix of Bilibio =

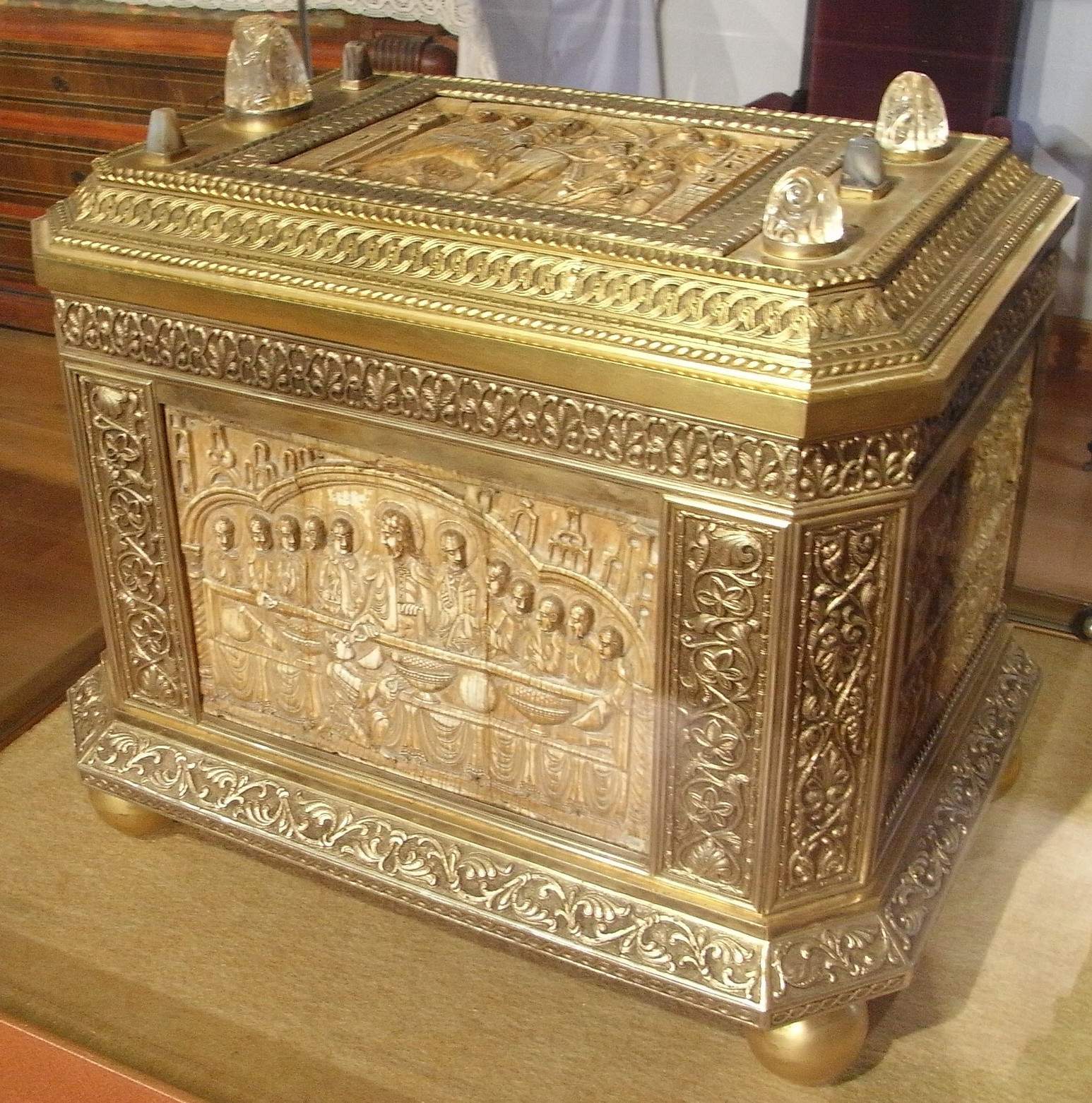
Casket of Felix in San Millán

Felix of Bilibio, known in Spanish as San Felices de Bilibio, was a 5th-century hermit and holy man in Roman Spain.

Felix is mentioned in the Vita Aemiliani, a biography of Saint Aemilianus written by Braulio of Zaragoza in 635–640. He was apparently born in the first half of the 5th century and met Aemilianus late in the same century. He lived at the castellum of Bilibio in what is today La Rioja. According to Braulio,

Rumor had brought [Aemilianus] word that a certain hermit named Felix, a most holy man whom he might properly offer himself as a disciple, was then living in Castle Bilibium. He hastened thither and camet oh im and readily offered himself as a servant and was instructed by him how to guid his steps unfalteringly towards the kingdom above. By this deed, I believe he showed us that no one can correctly guide his steps to the blessed life without instruction of his elders. . .

Felix came to be regarded as a saint. In 1090, his relics were transferred from Bilibio to the monastery of San Millán de la Cogolla (named after Aemilianus). In 1109–1110, at the request of his abbot, the monk Grimaldo de San Millán wrote two works of hagiography celebrating Felix, known together as the Translatio et miracula sancti Felicis presbyteri ('Translation and Miracles of holy Felix the elder'). It recounts the transfer of his relics and eight miracles attributed to the saint's intervention between 1090 and 1098.

== Bibliography ==
- Barlow, Claude W. (1969). Iberian Fathers, Vol. 2: Braulio of Saragossa, Fructuosus of Braga. The Fathers of the Church, Vol 63. Catholic University of America Press.
- Martín-Iglesias, José Carlos (2024). "La Traslación y milagros del presbítero san Felices (BHL 2861-2862)". In Martín-Iglesias, José Carlos; Henriet, Patrick; Esteban Martínez, Carmen (eds.). Hagiografía hispana de los siglos IX–XIII en los reinos de Aragón y Castilla y León: Vidas de santos, hallazgos y traslaciones de reliquias, libros de milagos, himnos. Brepols. pp. 36–43.
- Vivancos Gómez, Miguel C. (2018). "Felices de Bilibio, San". Diccionario Biográfico Español. Real Academia de la Historia.
