= The Book of Numbers in the Holy Scriptures =

Treatise attributed to Isidore of Seville

Liber numerorum qui in sanctis Scripturis occurrunt
- Author: Isidore of Seville
- Genre: Treatise, Biblical exegesis
- Publication date: 7th century (circa 612–615 CE)
- Publication place: Visigothic Kingdom (modern-day Spain)

The work Liber numerorum qui in sanctis Scripturis occurrunt (in English, The Book of Numbers That Appear in the Holy Scriptures), according to the list by Braulio of Zaragoza, is a treatise on the symbolism of numbers within the Holy Scriptures, attributed to Isidore of Seville.

== Publication and authorship ==
F. Arévalo published the work in 1802. The authorship of this treatise remains uncertain, with differing opinions among scholars. Its authenticity as an Isidorian work is supported by C. Leonardi, O. García de la Fuente, J. Madoz, and J. Fontaine, who highlights its connections with the Etymologiae , as well as Domínguez del Val. However, McNally, Díaz y Díaz, and Bischoff question this attribution. In particular, Díaz y Díaz notes that none of the manuscript witnesses attribute the work to an author; only one manuscript originates from Hispania, and Braulio's description does not align with the incipit of Arévalo's edition. Therefore, it is also possible, as suggested by J.C. Martín Iglesias, that the original work cited by Braulio has been lost.

== Content and dating ==
In Arévalo's edition, the author begins by asserting that understanding the meaning of numbers is far from useless, as they contain many spiritual lessons and warnings. The treatise provides a definition of numbers and highlights the differences between even and odd numbers. It describes numbers from 1 to 16, then from 18 to 20, as well as numbers 24, 30, 40, 46, 50, and 60. For each number studied, its main characteristics are presented first from a strictly mathematical perspective and then from symbolic and spiritual viewpoints, indicating their relevance in both Testaments. Despite its stylistic clarity, the treatise is often characterized by monotony and mechanical repetition.

According to J.A. de Aldama, the work could be dated between 612 CE and 615 CE based solely on Braulio's Renotatio librorum divi Isidori. However, this criterion is no longer considered definitive today. J. Fontaine argues instead that Isidore wrote the treatise at Braulio's request and completed it in 632 CE.

== Influence ==
The Liber numerorum by Isidore of Seville influenced various medieval authors such as Rabanus Maurus (776–856), Hugh of Saint Victor (c.1096–1141), John of Salisbury (c.1115–1180), William of Auvergne (1164), Odo of Morimond (1116–1161), Thibaut of Langres (late 12th century), and especially Bartholomew of England (c.1203–1272).

== See also ==
- Isidore of Seville
- Biblical numerology
- Symbolism of numbers

== Bibliography ==
=== Editions ===
- Braulio of Zaragoza: La Renotatio librorum domini Isidori. Introduction, critical edition and translation, ed. J.C. Martín Iglesias, San Millán de la Cogolla (2004).
- Divi Isidori Hispalensis episcopi opera omnia, ed. J. Grial, Madrid (1599).
- Isidorus Hispalensis: Le livre des nombres. Liber numerorum, ed. J.Y Guillaumin, Paris (2005).
- S. Isidori Hispalensis Episcopi Hispaniarum doctoris opera omnia, ed. F. Arévalo, Vol V., Rome (1802), pp. 220–248.

=== Studies ===
- McNally, R.E., Isidoriana, "Theological Studies," Vol 20 (1959), pp. 432–442.
- Martín Iglesias, J.C., Escritores Visigóticos: Reglas Monásticas, Madrid (2011), p. 7.
- La trasmissione dei testi latini nel Medioevo, Vol II., edited by P.Chiesa and L.Castaldi., Florence (2005), pp. 407–411.
- Trisoglio, F., Introduzione a Isidoro di Siviglia, Brescia (2009), Chap XII., p92.
- De Aldama, J.A., Indicaciones sobre la cronología de las obras de San Isidoro, in "Miscellanea Isidoriana," homage to St.Isidore in his XIII centenary of death (636 - April 4 –1936), pp57–89.
