= Grimaud =

Grimaud may refer to:

- Grimaud, Var, a town in France
- Grimaud (company), a brand of French playing card
- Grimoald (disambiguation), Grimaud being a variant
- Hélène Grimaud (born 1969), pianist
- A character in Alexandre Dumas's The d'Artagnan Romances
