= Grimoard =

Grimoard is a surname. Notable people with the surname include:

- Angelic de Grimoard (born 1315), French Cardinal, younger brother of Pope Urban V
- Anne Claude Philippe de Tubieres de Grimoard de Pestels de Levis, Comte de Caylus (1692–1765), French antiquarian
- Claude Abraham de Tubières de Grimoard de Pestel de Lévis, duc de Caylus (1672–1759), French military leader
- Philippe Henri, Comte de Grimoard (1753–1815), French soldier and military writer
- Pope Urban V (1310–1370), whose name was Guillaume Grimoard

== See also ==
- Grimoald (disambiguation), a given name
