= Grimoald =

Grimoald, Grimald, Grimoart, Grimwald, Grimuald, or Grimbald is a Germanic personal name.

It may refer to:

== Personal name ==
- Grimoald I of Benevento, duke of Benevento (651–662) and king of the Lombards (662–671)
- Grimoald II of Benevento, duke of Benevento (677–680)
- Grimoald III of Benevento, duke of Benevento (787–806)
- Grimoald IV of Benevento, duke of Benevento (806–817)
- Grimoald of Bavaria, duke of Bavaria (715–725)
- Grimoald, son of Tassilo II
- Grimoald, subdeacon, companion of Reineldis and martyr
- Grimoald I the Elder, Mayor of the Palace of Austrasia (643–656)
- Grimoald II the Younger, Mayor of the Palace of Neustria and Burgundy (695–714)
- Grimoald Alferanites, Prince of Bari (1121–1132)
- Grimoaldo of the Purification (1883–1902), a religious and clerical student of the Passionist Congregation
- Grimoart Gausmar, 12th-century troubadour
- Grimoald of Pontecorvo, 12th-century saint
- Grimbald of Saint-Bertin, 9th-century saint

== Surname ==
- Nicholas Grimald (1519–1562), English poet
- Guillaume Grimoard, better known as Pope Urban V

== See also ==
- Grimoard & Grimaud (disambiguation), related surnames
- Grimaldo (disambiguation) & Grimaldi (disambiguation), Romance-language forms of the name Grimwald
