= Biblical numerology =

Numeric symbolism in biblical texts

Biblical numerology is the use of numerology in the Bible to convey a meaning outside of the numerical value of the actual number being used. Numerological values in the Bible often relate to a wider usage in the Ancient Near East.

== Values ==
- Three and a half. A broken seven or a symbolic week that "is arrested midway in its normal course." The most prominent example is in Daniel 12:7, where "a time, two times, and half a time" or "time, times, and a half" designates a period of time under which God's faithful are persecuted by the fourth beast. Corresponds approximately to the temple's desecration under Antiochus IV Epiphanes (167-164 BC). In various Jewish sources, three and a half also signifies the amount of time that the Temple is given over to heathen worship (Dan. 7:25; 2 Macc. 10:5; Test. of Levi 17:1). Variations of the three and a half years result in other numerological values. For example, three and a half years correspond to 42 months or 1,260 days. Thus, both 42 and 1,260 have numerological use in the Bible. The three and a half symbol as appearing in the Bible may derive from the Babylonian calendar.
- Four and ten. Can be used to signify totality. There are ten fingers and ten toes, the total number of digits found on humans, thus the Base 10 numerical system.
- Seven. Can be used to signify "perfection" or "completeness". It may have been inspired from the fact that the primary lunar phases are roughly 7 days (7.4) each. Examples include the seven days of creation and so seven days that make up a week, and the seven lamps on the Temple menorah. One variation on the use of seven is the use of the number six in numerology, used as a final hallmark in a series leading to a seven (e.g. mankind is created on the sixth day in Genesis, out of the seven days of creation). Sometimes, it is used to refer to a value falling short of a seven. For example, the number of the beast is 666, which represents its evil and having fallen short of the divinely perfect number of seven.
  - Seven can also be used as reference to the seven hills of Rome, and, by further extrapolation, to all Gentiles. An example of this can be seen in the difference between Jesus's two feeding the multitude miracles: the first was in Bethsaida, a Jewish region, with enough food remaining to fill twelve baskets (representing the twelve tribes of Israel), whereas the second took place in the predominately Gentile Decapolis area, this time yielding seven baskets of leftovers.
- Eight. Is sometimes used to refer to a "new life," "resurrection," or a new beginning. There are eight people on Noah's Ark (2 Peter 2:5), circumcision takes place on the eighth day (Genesis 17:12), the eight thousandth year represents the end (2 Enoch 33; Sibylline Oracles 1.280-81)
- Twelve. Reflects the 12 lunar months in a lunar year and refers to completeness, often associated with the people of God. There are twelve tribes of Israel, and Jesus made the decision to have twelve disciples.
- Forty. Represents a generation or a full period of time. Moses was associated with 40 several times: he was 40 years old when he was exiled from Egypt, he returned 40 years later to lead the Hebrews out of captivity, spent 40 days atop Mount Sinai, spent 40 years with the Hebrews wandering in the desert, and so forth. David and Solomon each ruled over all of Israel for 40 years. Goliath challenged the Israelites for 40 days before David killed him. Jesus was tempted by Satan in the desert for 40 days. Jesus remained in Jerusalem and Galilee for 40 days before his ascension.
- Seventy. A value used across the ancient Near East to denote a larger group, usually a group of people, taken as a whole.

== In the Hebrew Bible ==
=== Ages of the patriarchs ===
The following table lists all the ages of the patriarchs from Adam to Moses as listed in the Bible. These add up to 12,600.

| Nr | Patriarch | Age | Nr | Patriarch | Age | Nr | Patriarch | Age |
|---|---|---|---|---|---|---|---|---|
| 1 | Adam | 930 | 10 | Noah | 950 | 19 | Terah | 205 |
| 2 | Seth | 912 | 11 | Shem | 600 | 20 | Abraham | 175 |
| 3 | Enosh | 905 | 12 | Arpachshad | 438 | 21 | Isaac | 180 |
| 4 | Kenon | 910 | 13 | Shelah | 433 | 22 | Jacob | 147 |
| 5 | Mehalalel | 895 | 14 | Eber | 464 | 23 | Levi | 137 |
| 6 | Jared | 962 | 15 | Peleg | 239 | 24 | Kohath | 133 |
| 7 | Enoch | 365 | 16 | Reu | 239 | 25 | Amram | 137 |
| 8 | Methuselah | 969 | 17 | Serug | 230 | 26 | Moses | 120 |
| 9 | Lamech | 777 | 18 | Nahor | 148 | TOTAL 12,600 | | |

The value of 12,600 is a variant of the symbolic value of 1,260 known from apocalyptic theology (although may derive from earlier traditions), only multiplied by ten. The patriarchal ages were selected in order to achieve this numerological total. Another example of the numerical schema of 12,600 can be found in the War Scroll discovered at Qumran, where "the Sons of Light shall fight against the Sons of Darkness in the final days for a period of 35 years. Employing the Jewish luni-solar calendar of the 360-day year, 35 years equals 12,600 days."

=== Flood ===
The flood narrative was constructed in order to include the usage of commonly used numbers such as seven and forty. There are repeated reference to events occurring in seven days (Gen. 7:4, 10; 8:10, 12) and seven pairs of clean animals (Gen. 7:2-3). The floodwaters are said to have come for forty days and forty nights.

In this narrative, it is possible that some words were deliberately used in multiples of seven in the flood pericope (Gen. 6:9-917). For example, God converses seven times with Noah. The Hebrew word for "flesh" appears fourteen times (7 x 2), "water" is mentioned twenty one times, and "Noah" is mentioned thirty-five times. However, it is not easy to distinguish here between authorial intention and coincidence.

=== Dates and reigns ===
The usage of forty years as a timespan (and as a shorthand for a generation) is common across a number of biblical texts. For example, 1 Chronicles 5:30-36 lists twelve generations separating the Exodus from the construction of the Temple of Solomon. If each generation were to last forty years, that would be the equivalent of four hundred and eighty years separating the Exodus from the construction of Solomon's Temple. Unsurprisingly, 1 Kings 6:1 directly dates the construction of Solomon's temple four hundred and eighty years after the Exodus. Scholars have in turn concluded that this dating relies on the numerological representation of the length of a generation. Other examples are commonly found across biblical texts. The Israelites wandered in the wilderness for forty years before reaching the promised land. Moses' life proceeded through three stages of forty years. Both David and Solomon reigned over Israel for forty years. In similar manner, Jesus wandered in the wilderness for forty days.

=== Armies ===
The Books of Chronicles uses large numbers for literary and creative purposes in order to convey meanings regarding relations between God and monarchs. This text gives the number of men in the armies of seven Judean kings: Rehoboam, Abijah, Asa, Jehoshaphat, Amaziah, Uzziah, and Ahaz.

The army of Jehoshaphat consisted of five units, all of which had a number of men either approximating to the nearest hundred thousand or ending in 80,000 (e.g. 280,000 and 180,000). The total number of soldiers in all these units numbered 1,160,000 men. This value appears to be exactly twice the size of the army of Jehoshaphat's father Asa, which is given as 580,000 while also equal to the total number of men in the armies of Jehoshaphat's three predecessors combined: the 180,000 men of Rehoboam, the 400,000 men of Abijah, and the 580,000 men of Asa. Jehoshaphat is conveyed in the biblical texts as one of the righteous kings of Judah, and thus his army was made to vastly exceeded and in fact sum the armies of several of his predecessors to represent the divine favour he had for his righteousness. In addition, the army of Asa is numbered at 580,000 men is the exact sum of the armies of his own two predecessors: The 180,000 of Rehoboam and the 400,000 of Abijah.

Several kings after Jehoshaphat are recorded as unrighteous kings. The next king whose army is recorded, Amaziah, had 300,000 men – equal to only one of the divisions of Jehoshaphat's (or Asa's) army. His successor, Uzziah, had 307,500 men, representing a rise of 7,500 men, one fortieth of 300,000. The exact meaning of this slight rise is unclear. Finally, the next king Ahaz, considered a dismal king in the Judean history recorded by Chronicles, suffered a loss of 120,000 soldiers to his army, and so the total number of men in the army once again reverted to Rehoboam's original 180,000.

There are other large army figures in Chronicles. Without counting the tribes of Levi and Benjamin, David is said to have ruled over 1,100,000 men from Israel and an additional 470,000 men from Judah, totalling 1,570,000 men. The 400,000 man unit of Abijah may represent a reduction of 70,000 men said to have been lost due to the plague that hit the land of Israel (1 Chron. 21:14; cf. 2 Sam. 24:15). In addition, when Jeroboam goes into battle against Abijah, he is recorded as commanding exactly twice the number of Abijah's men: 800,000. Zerah the Ethiopian goes into battle with Asa with a million men (likely chosen because it was a large and round number). While not an army value, Chronicles also records 200,000 civilians from Judah being captured by the Israelites during the reign of Ahaz (2 Chron. 28:8).

Army sizes in Chronicles
| Leader | Army Size | Reference |
|---|---|---|
| David | 1,570,000 | 1 Chronicles 21:5 |
| Jeroboam | 500,000 (loss) | 2 Chronicles 13:17 |
| Rehoboam | 180,000 | 2 Chronicles 11:1, cf. 1 Kings 12:21 |
| Abijah | 400,000 | 2 Chronicles 13:3 |
| Jeroboam | 800,000 | 2 Chronicles 13:3 |
| Asa | 580,000 | 2 Chronicles 14:8 |
| Jehoshaphat | 1,160,000 | 2 Chronicles 17:14-18 |
| Amaziah | 300,000 | 2 Chronicles 25:5 |
| Uzziah | 307,500 | 2 Chronicles 26:12-13 |
| Ahaz | 180,000 | 2 Chronicles 28:6 |
| Zerah the Ethiopian | 1,000,000 | 2 Chronicles 14:9 |

Chronicles is not the only text in the Bible that records large values for army sizes. In Judges, the Midianites lose 120,000 men in battle (Judg. 8:10). In addition, the Israelites are said to command over 400,000 men (Judg. 20:2, 17). In Samuel, the number of men that Saul is said to command reaches 330,000 (1 Sam. 11:8). Nevertheless, the numbers in these texts do not appear to have been used for literary or creative purposes in the same way as they were in Chronicles. Samuel also records different numbers for the army of David in comparison to Chronicles. 2 Samuel 24:9 gives the number of David's men at 1,300,000. This represents a sum of 800,000 men from Israel and 500,000 from Judah. On the other hand, Josephus' analysis of this text reaches the same 1,300,000 total, but by recording 900,000 men from Israel and 400,000 men from Judah.

== Christian numerology ==
=== In the early Church ===
In the early years of Christianity, the Church Fathers commented extensively on numerology. Influenced mainly by Biblical precepts, the Fathers down to the time of Bede and even later gave much attention to the sacredness and mystical significance not only of certain numerals in themselves but also of the numerical totals given by the constituent letters with which words were written. An example is in the early Epistle of Barnabas. This document appeals to the Book of Genesis as mystically pointing to the name and self-oblation of the coming Messias.

"Learn, therefore," says the writer, "that Abraham who first appointed circumcision, looked forward in spirit unto Jesus when he circumcised, having received the ordinances of three letters. For the Scripture saith, And Abraham circumcised of his household eighteen males and three hundred.' What then was the knowledge given unto him? Understand ye that He saith the eighteen' first, and then after an interval three hundred.' In the [number] eighteen [the Greek IOTA] stands for 10, [the Greek ETA] for eight. Here thou hast Jesus ([in Greek] IESOUS). And because the cross in the [Greek TAU] was to have grace, he saith also three hundred.' So he revealeth Jesus in two letters and in the remaining one the cross".

Here the numerical value of the Greek letters iota and eta, the first letters of the Holy Name, is 10 and 8, for 18, while Tau, which stands for the form of the cross, represents 300.

==== Irenaeus ====
Irenaeus explains the number of the beast 666 (Apoc., xiii, 18) by adding the numerical value of each "Greek letter" in the names "Evanthas" (Ευανθας), "Lateinos" (Λατεινος), and "Teitan" (Τειταν). The constituent of all the Greek letters yields the total:

| Ε | Υ | Α | Ν | Θ | Α | Σ | Sum |
| 5 | 400 | 1 | 50 | 9 | 1 | 200 | 666 |

| Λ | Α | Τ | Ε | Ι | Ν | Ο | Σ | Sum |
| 30 | 1 | 300 | 5 | 10 | 50 | 70 | 200 | 666 |

| Τ | Ε | Ι | Τ | Α | Ν | Sum |
| 300 | 5 | 10 | 300 | 1 | 50 | 666 |

Irenaeus also discusses at length the Gnostic numerical interpretation of the holy name "Jesus" as the equivalent of 888, and he claims that by writing the name in Hebrew characters an entirely different interpretation is necessitated.

==== Ambrose ====
St. Ambrose commenting upon the days of creation and the Sabbath remarks,

The number seven is good, but we do not explain it after the doctrine of Pythagoras and the other philosophers, but rather according to the manifestation and division of the grace of the Spirit; for the prophet Isaias has enumerated the principal gifts of the Holy Spirit as seven

— Letter to Horontianus

==== Augustine ====
Augustine of Hippo, replying to Tichonius the Donatist, observes that

if Tichonius had said that these mystical rules open out some of the hidden recesses of the law, instead of saying that they reveal all the mysteries of the law, he would have spoken truth

=== Apocalyptic numerology and the book of Revelation ===
Appealing to the Old Testament traditions that required two or three witnesses to establish a testimony, the two witnesses of Revelation represent the whole church in its specific role as witness.

Three and a half years and its variants of 42 months and 1,260 days are employed throughout Revelation (Rev. 11:2-11; 12:4-6, 11; 13:5).

Four appears frequently in Revelation. It refers to the four living creatures around God's throne (Rev. 4:6, 8; 5:6, 8, 14) and the fourfold division of humanity representing all of creation. The Earth has four corners (Rev. 7:1) representing north, south, east, and west (Rev. 21:13). Likewise, New Jerusalem, representing the new earth, has four sides (Rev. 21:16).

There is also the use of the number six hundred sixty-six (666) as the number of the beast from the sea. The number of six has the hallmarks of the perfect seven, but it falls short. It is not the ultimate (i.e., seven); only the penultimate (i.e., six). As Christopher Rowland notes, the beast has “most of the hallmarks of truth, and so it can easily deceive.”

The number 'seven' is widely used throughout Revelation, including in reference to the seven churches, seven bowls, seven seals, seven trumpets, seven thunders, Seven Spirits of God, seven stars, seven lampstands, seven eyes and horns of the Lamb of God, seven heads and diadems of the dragon, and seven heads of the beast in the Book of Revelation.

The red dragon and the beast from the sea each have ten horns, signifying their claim to total power (A horn is a symbol of power in Deut. 33:17; 1 Kings 22:11; Psalm 89:17; Revelation 5:6; 1 Enoch 90.6-16.). The beast from the sea has ten diadems on its ten horns (Revelation 13:1), emblematic of its claim to unlimited or total ruling authority. Multiples of tens heighten the notion of totality. For example, the millennium (10 x 10 x 10 or the thousand-year reign of the returned Christ and the saints in Revelation 20:4) represents a total, uninterrupted period of rule that is characterized by the absence of satanic interference (cf. Rev. 20:2). Ten cubed also suggests symmetry. Other multiples of tens lengthen and heighten the notion of totality. The 144,000 (Rev. 7:4; 14:1, 3) are the multiples of 12 x 12 x 10 x 10 x 10, a symbolic number that signifies the total number (tens) of the people of God (twelves). The 12,000 stadia (12 x 10 x 10 x 10) of the walls of the New Jerusalem in Rev. 21:16 represent an immense city that can house the total number (tens) of God's people (twelves). The 1,600 stadia (4 squared times 10 squared) in Rev. 14:20 represent worldwide destruction. Fours, the number of the earth or creation, combined with tens, the number for totality, suggest a bloodbath that is not only extensive but covers the entire earth.

Revelation uses the number twelve to refer to the number of angels (Rev. 21:14), number of stars (12:1), twelve angels at twelve gates each of which have the names of the twelve apostles inscribed (Rev. 21:12), the wall itself being 12 x 12 = 144 cubits in length (Rev. 21:17) and is adorned with twelve jewels, and the tree of life has twelve kinds of fruit (Rev. 22:2). The New Jerusalem measures 12,000 stadia on each side (Rev. 21:16), a cube and perfect dwelling place for all of God's people. Twelve is lengthened to 144,000 (12 x 12 x 1,000) in Revelation 7:4; 14:1,3, and indicates the complete number of God's Israel: the whole Christian community.

=== Other examples ===
The apocalyptic numeral derived from the length of 42 months (=3.5 years) is seen in numerous contexts. Northcote writes "In Num xxxiii, forty-two stages are listed between Egypt and the Promised Land, and the LXX version of Josh v 6 states that the Israelites spent forty-two years wandering in the wilderness ... [and] according to Matt i 17, forty-two generations elapsed from Abraham to the birth of Jesus". Furthermore, Na'aman has observed the following for the first few monarchs of Israel: Saul reigned for 40 years, his son Ishbaal reigned for 2 years, David reigned for 40 years, and Solomon reigned for 40 years. In other words, the years for the reigns of Saul and Ishbaal are also ideological, and stem from a pairing with the years of David and Solomon's reign to reach a total of 42.

The value of seventy appears fifty two times across the Old Testament. Fensham summarizes the trend;

The numeral seventy occurs fifty-two times independently in the Old Testament. It is used in various spheres of meaning, viz. for palm trees (Exod. IS. 27 and Num. 33. 9), for weights (e.g. Exod. 38. 29, Num. 7), for a length measurement (Ezek. 41. 12), for a period of time (e.g. Gen.s. 12, II.26, so.3, Ps.go. Io, Jer.2S. I2;2g. Io, Zech. 7.s), for cattle intended as a holocaust (2 Chr. 29. 32) and for people. We want to elaborate here on the occurrence of seventy for people. It is used for the descendants of Jacob (Exod. I. sand Deut. 10. 22), for the elders of Israel (Exod. 24. I, Num. II, Ezek. 8. II), for submissive kings (Judg. I. 7), for men struck by the Lord (I Sam. 6. Ig)l and for the sons or brothers of a Judge or a king. In one instance, Ezra 8.7, the seventy male descendants of Elam are mentioned. In this case we have probably an exact number of people as it is clear from other numbers used in this charter. The application of seventy to the sons and brothers of a Judge or king can be summarized as follows: it is used for the forty sons and thirty grandsons of Abdon, riding on seventy asses (Judg. 12. 14); the other two occurrences are of special interest, viz. the seventy sons of Jerubbaal (Judg. 8. 30), are described as murdered by Abimelech (Judg. 9. 5); in 2 Kgs. 10. 1-7 the plot against the seventy sons of Ahab by Jehu is described as well as their actual murdering.

Fensham also draws attention to the usage of this value across a variety of extra-biblical literature from the ancient near east, especially in its usage in Ugaritic literature relating to Baal.

There have also been proposals regarding the use of numerology in biblical poetry, such as in the psalms.

== Gematria ==
Various scholars have raised the possibility of gematria on various occasions in the Hebrew Bible.

There are at least two cases of gematria appearing in the New Testament. The reference to the miraculous catch of 153 fish in John 21:11 is largely seen as an application of gematria derived from Ezekiel 47. The appearance of this gematria in John 21:11 has been connected to one of the Dead Sea Scrolls, namely 4Q252, which also applies the same gematria of 153 derived from Ezekiel 47 to state that Noah arrived at Mount Ararat on the 153rd day after the beginning of the flood. Many historians see gematria behind the reference to the number of the name of the beast in Revelation as "666", which corresponds to the numerical equivalent of the Greek characters behind the name "Nero Caesar", referring to the 1st century Roman emperor who persecuted the early Christians. On the other hand, another possible influence on the use of 666 in Revelation goes back to reference to Solomon's intake of 666 talents of gold in 1 Kings 10:14.

== See also ==
- 'Ilm al-huruf
- Marcosians
- Significance of numbers in Judaism
- The Book of Numbers in the Holy Scriptures
- Symbolism of numbers

== General references ==
Attribution
