= Grimaldo =

Grimaldo is a Romance form of the Germanic personal name Grimwald. It may refer to:

== Personal name ==
- Grimaldo Canella
- Grimaldo González
- Grimaldo de San Millán
- Grimaldo Turculis

== Surname ==
- Álex Grimaldo, Spanish footballer
- Joao Grimaldo, Peruvian footballer
- José de Grimaldo

== See also ==
- House of Grimaldi, the Monaco dynasty descended from Grimaldo Canella of Genoa
- Grimaldi, Calabria, formerly known as Grimaldo
- Grimald
