= Aemilian of Cogolla =

Iberic saint

Aemilian
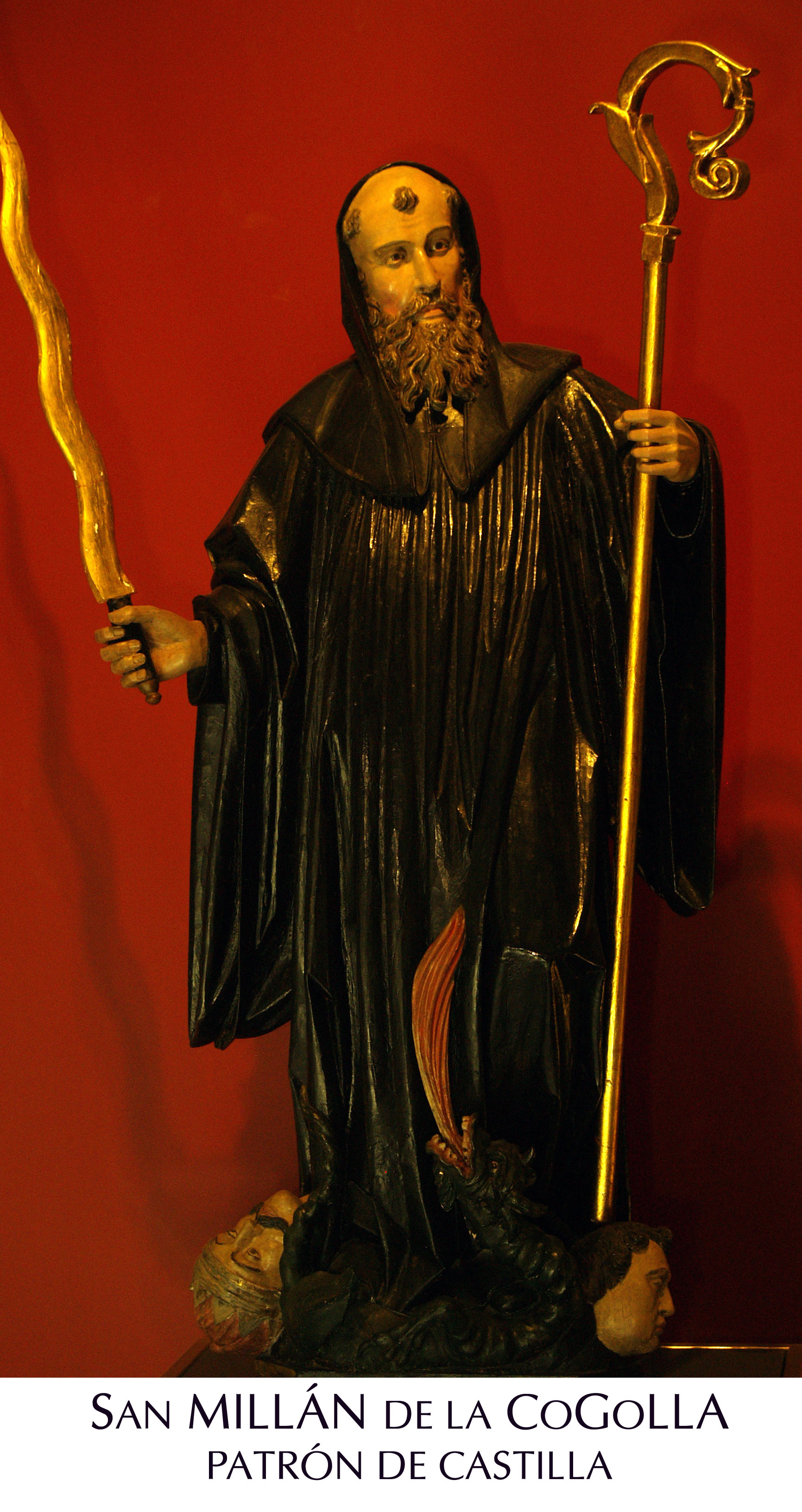

Abbot
- Born: 12 November 472; La Rioja, Visigothic Kingdom
- Died: 11 June 573; Visigothic Kingdom
- Venerated in: Roman Catholic Church; Eastern Orthodox Church; Anglican Communion
- Major shrine: Augustinian Recollets monastery of La Cogolla
- Feast: 12 November
- Attributes: monk on horseback
- Patronage: Castile

Saint Aemilian (/ˈimiːliən/; (in Latin Emilianus or Aemilianus) (12 November 472 – 11 June 573) is an Iberic saint, widely revered throughout Spain, who lived during the age of Visigothic rule.

== Life ==
According to his Vita, written by Braulio, the bishop of Caesaraugusta (modern Zaragoza) roughly a hundred years after the saint's death, Aemilian was born in Vergaja, which is identified with Berceo in La Rioja, where he was a shepherd.

Aemilian had a religious experience, perhaps around the age of twenty, which led him to decide to dedicate himself to God's service. He sought out an experienced hermit in Bilibio, Felix (more usually known by the Spanish form of his common name, San Felices), where Aemilian lived for a number of years.

After leaving his teacher, Aemilian lived as a hermit (perhaps even a gyrovagus) in the mountains or on the historic Roman road which became the Camino de Santiago. Didymus the Bishop of Tarazona ordained Aemilian and appointed him parish priest of Vergaja. However, Aemilian aroused the opposition of his fellow priests because of his heavy distribution of alms or reputation for holiness or miracle working. Aemilian returned to the wilderness, and a small community of disciples gathered around his cell. He died at a venerable age, and his body, was initially interred at his hermitage, but later transferred to a monastery built in memory of him.

== Veneration ==
Braulio also recorded miracles that occurred after death of Aemilian, but the fame of the San Millán de la Cogolla monastery dedicated in his memory (and which held his tomb) eclipsed that of its founder. San Millán de Suso monastery is known for its Mozarabic architecture, and its growing popularity during the heyday of the pilgrimage rout led to its expansion in the eleventh century with San Millán de Yuso (the communities however having separate abbots until the 12th century).

The longstanding monastic community (Benedictine by the mid-medieval era) is credited with one of the oldest books written in the Spanish language, the Vida de San Millán de la Cogolla (biography by Gonzalo de Berceo). St. Dominic of Silos (the miracleworker for whom Saint Dominic was named) also received his education and began his religious career at San Millan monastery.

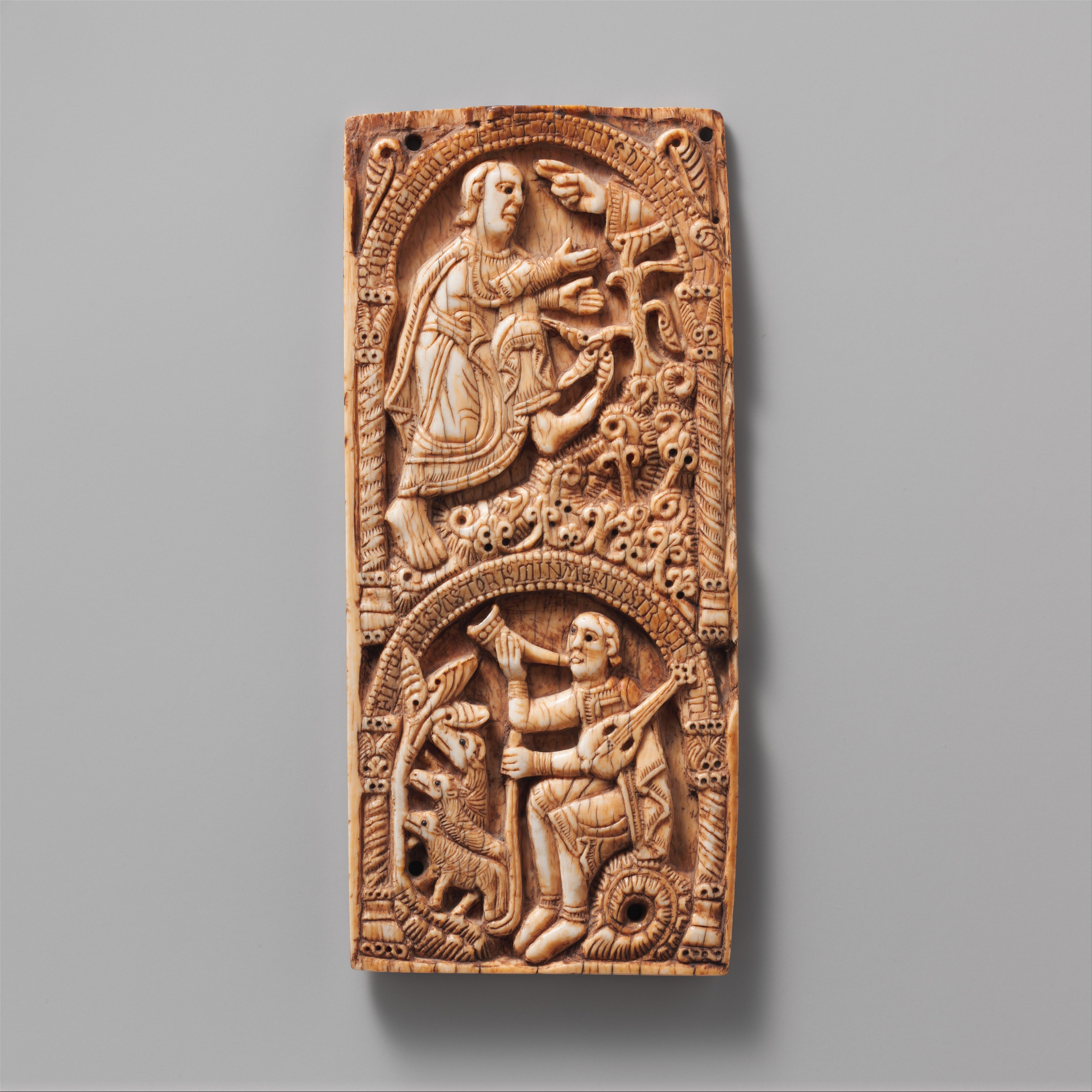
1060-1080 A.D., La Rioja, Spain. Cloisters' plaque, Metropolitan Museum of Art

He is a patron saint of La Rioja; the longer name of San Millán de la Cogolla refers to the monastic cowl. Because of the monastery's role on the traditional pilgrimage route, representations of Aemilian can be mixed with that of Saint James the Moor-slayer, such as a Benedictine on horseback with a banner and sword.

=== Cloisters' plaque ===
The Cloisters' plaque was part of the reliquary shrine (its roof) that housed the relics of Saint Aemilian. It was made to transport the saint's relics from the monastery at Suso to the church of San Millán de la Cogolla. Top panel depicts the saint receiving a blessing from the hand of God. The bottom panel depicts the saint herding his sheep, blowing a horn, a three-stringed lute (possibly a cythara or pandura) at hand.

== See also ==
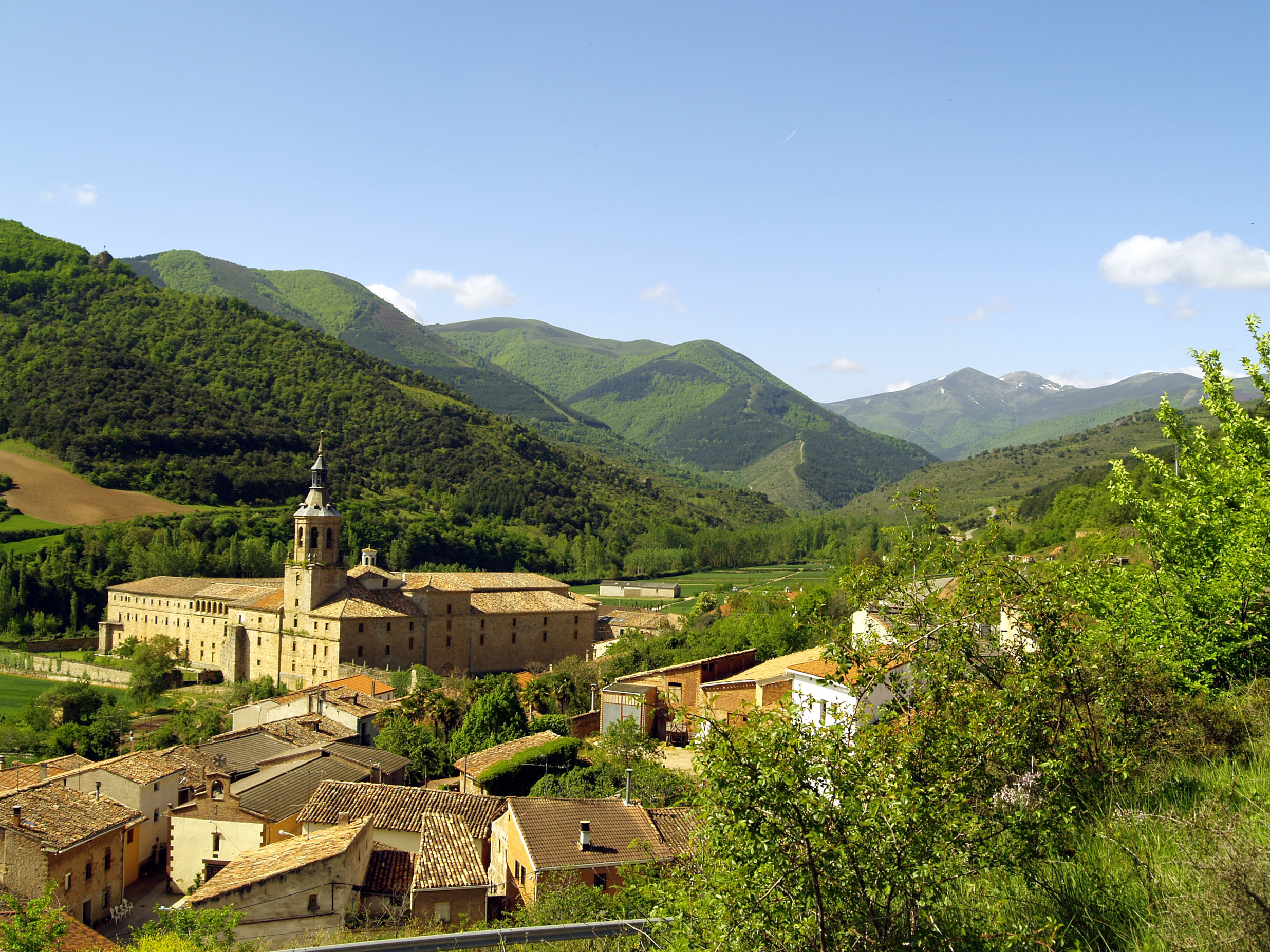
Monastery of San Millán de Yuso

- San Millán de la Cogolla, La Rioja
- es:Monasterio de San Millán de Yuso
- es:Monasterio de San Millán de Suso7
