= Isidore of Seville =

Hispano-Roman scholar (c. 560–636)

Saint Isidore of Seville
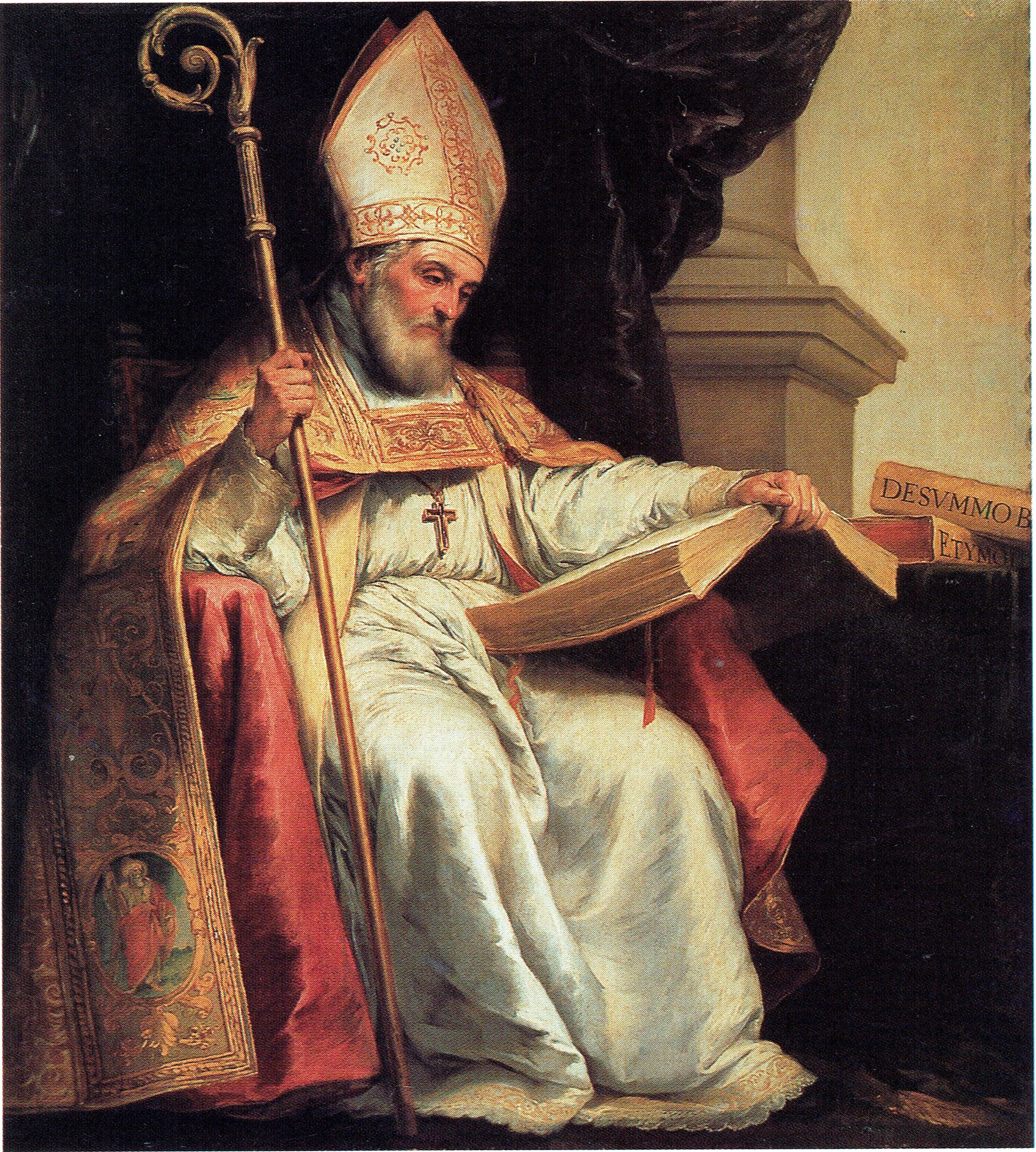
- St. Isidore of Seville (1655), depicted by Bartolomé Esteban Murillo

Bishop, Confessor and Doctor of the Church
- Born: c. 560; Cartago Spartaria, Eastern Roman Empire
- Died: 4 April 636; Hispalis, Visigothic Kingdom
- Venerated in: Catholic Church; Eastern Orthodox Church
- Canonized: Pre-Congregation
- Feast: 4 April in the vetus ordo of the Roman Rite and in the Byzantine Rite.; 15 December (in León) translation of Saint Isidore.; 22 December in the Mozarabic Rite.; 26 April in the novus ordo of the Roman Rite.
- Attributes: Bees and apiaries; Old bishop with a prince at his feet; Pens; Books; with Saint Leander, Saint Fulgentius of Cartagena, and Saint Florentina; the Etymologiae
- Patronage: Students, Computer programmers, Computer users

Philosophical work
- Era: Medieval philosophy
- School: Etymology; Augustinianism
- Main interests: Theology, Grammar, rhetoric, mathematics, medicine, law, languages, cities, animals and birds, the physical world, geography
- Notable works: Etymologiae
- Notable ideas: Isidoran map

Isidore of Seville (Latin: Isidorus Hispalensis; c. 560 – 4 April 636) was a Hispano-Roman scholar, theologian and archbishop of Seville. He is widely regarded, in the words of the 19th-century historian Charles Forbes René de Montalembert, as "the last scholar of the ancient world".

At a time of disintegration of classical culture, aristocratic violence, and widespread illiteracy, Isidore was involved in the conversion of the Arian Visigothic kings to Catholicism, both assisting his brother Leander of Seville and continuing after Leander's death. He was influential in the inner circle of Sisebut, Visigothic king of Hispania. Like Leander, he played a prominent role in the Councils of Toledo and Seville.

His fame after his death was based on his Etymologiae, an etymological encyclopedia that assembled extracts of many books from classical antiquity that would otherwise have been lost. This work also helped to standardise the use of the full stop, comma and colon.

Since the Early Middle Ages, Isidore has sometimes been called Isidore the Younger or Isidore Junior (Latin: Isidorus iunior), because of the earlier history purportedly written by Isidore of Córdoba.

== Childhood and education ==
Isidore (Spanish pronunciation: [/isiðoɾe/] ee-see-DOH-reh) was born in Cartago Spartaria (now Cartagena, Spain), a former Carthaginian colony, to a notable family in Roman Hispania, of high social rank, His father was named Severianus and his mother Theodora. His parents were members of an influential family who were instrumental in the political-religious manoeuvring that converted the Visigothic kings from Arianism to Catholicism. The Catholic and Orthodox Churches celebrate him and all his siblings as known saints:

- An elder brother, Leander of Seville, immediately preceded Isidore as Archbishop of Seville and, while in office, opposed King Liuvigild.
- A younger brother, Fulgentius of Cartagena, served as the Bishop of Astigi at the start of the new reign of the Christian King Reccared.
- His sister, Florentina of Cartagena, was a nun who allegedly ruled over forty convents and one thousand consecrated religious. This claim seems unlikely, however, given the few functioning monastic institutions in Spania during her lifetime.

Isidore received his elementary education in the Cathedral school of Seville. In this institution, the first of its kind in Spania, a body of learned men including Archbishop Leander of Seville taught the trivium and quadrivium, the classic liberal arts. Isidore applied himself to study diligently enough that he quickly mastered classical Latin, and acquired some Greek and Hebrew.

Two centuries of Gothic control of Iberia incrementally suppressed the ancient institutions, classical learning, and manners of the Roman Empire. The associated culture entered a period of long-term decline. The ruling Visigoths nevertheless showed some respect for the outward trappings of Roman culture. Arianism meanwhile took deep root among the Visigoths as the form of Christianity that they received.

Scholars may debate whether Isidore ever personally embraced monastic life or affiliated with any religious order, but he undoubtedly esteemed the monks highly.

== Bishop of Seville ==
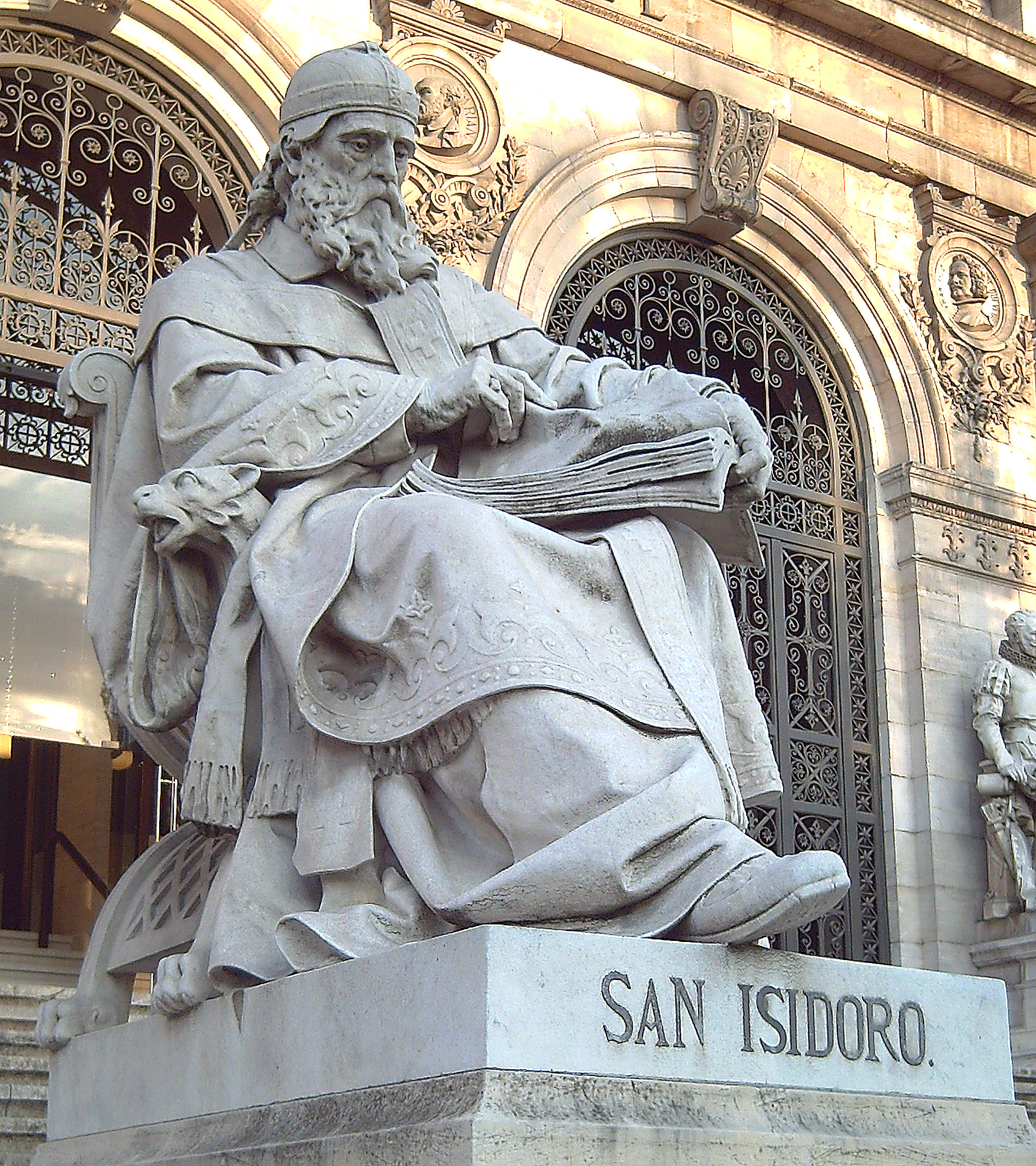
A statue of Isidore of Seville by José Alcoverro, 1892, outside the Biblioteca Nacional de España, in Madrid

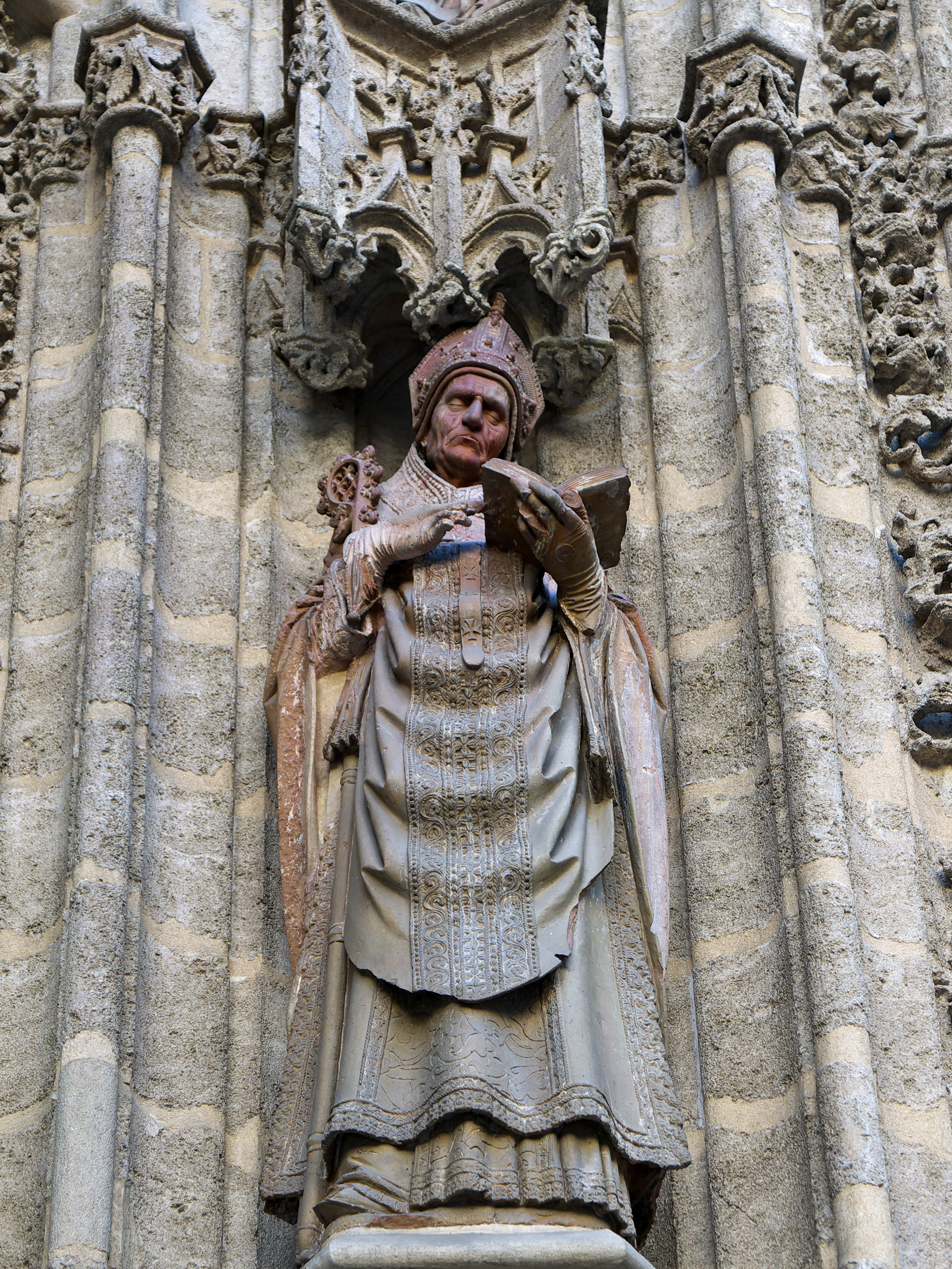
Seville Cathedral. Sculpture by Lorenzo Mercadante de Bretaña

After the death of Leander of Seville on 13 March 600 or 601, Isidore succeeded to the See of Seville. On his elevation to the episcopate, he immediately constituted himself as the protector of monks.

Archbishop Isidore attempted to unite the people of his see, torn between remnant Roman and ruling Visigothic cultures, into a united culture via religion and learning. He strengthened religious discipline, leading a conversion from Arianism to orthodox Catholicism, and stifled the new Christian sect of Acephali at its outset. Isidore also built an educational movement centered in Seville to preserve classical knowledge despite the collapse of the Western Roman Empire, and introduced his countrymen to Aristotle long before the Arabs studied Greek philosophy extensively.

In 619 Isidore of Seville pronounced anathema against any ecclesiastic who in any way should molest the monasteries.

== Second Synod of Seville (November 619) ==
Isidore presided over the Second Council of Seville, begun on 13 November 619 in the reign of King Sisebut, a provincial council attended by eight other bishops, all from the ecclesiastical province of Baetica in southern Spain. The Acts of the Council fully set forth the nature of Christ, countering the conceptions of Gregory, a Syrian representing the heretical Acephali.

== Third Synod of Seville (624) ==
Based on a few surviving canons found in the Pseudo-Isidorian Decretals, Isidore is known to have presided over an additional provincial council around 624.

The council dealt with a conflict over the See of Écija and wrongfully stripped bishop Martianus of his see, a situation that was rectified by the Fourth Council of Toledo. It also addressed a concern over Jews who had been forced to convert to Christianity.

The records of the council, unlike the First and Second Councils of Seville, were not preserved in the Hispana, a collection of canons and decretals likely edited by Isidore himself.

== Fourth National Council of Toledo ==
All bishops of Hispania attended the Fourth National Council of Toledo, begun on 5 December 633. The aged Archbishop Isidore presided over its deliberations and originated most enactments of the council.

Through Isidore's influence, this Council of Toledo promulgated a decree commanding all bishops to establish seminaries in their cathedral cities along the lines of the cathedral school at Seville, which had educated Isidore decades earlier. The decree prescribed the study of Greek, Hebrew, and the liberal arts and encouraged interest in law and medicine. The authority of the council made this education policy obligatory upon all bishops of the Kingdom of the Visigoths. The council granted a remarkable position and deference to the king of the Visigoths. The independent Church bound itself in allegiance to the acknowledged king; it said nothing of allegiance to the Bishop of Rome.

== Death ==
Isidore of Seville died on 4 April 636 after serving more than 32 years as archbishop of Seville.

== Works ==
Isidore's Latin style in the Etymologiae and elsewhere, though simple and lucid, reveals increasing local Visigothic traditions.

=== Etymologiae ===
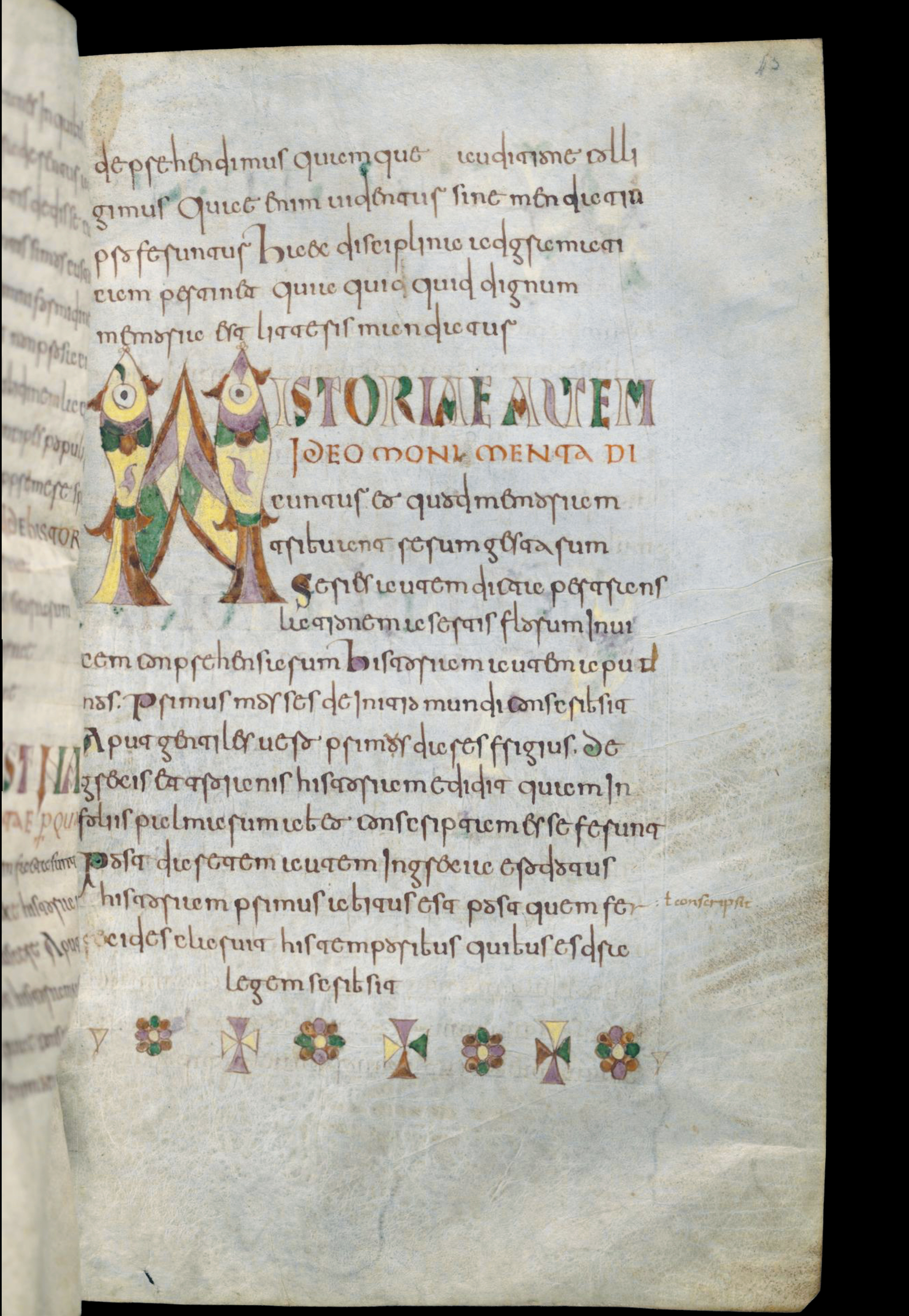
A page of Etymologiae, Carolingian manuscript (8th century), Brussels, Royal Library of Belgium

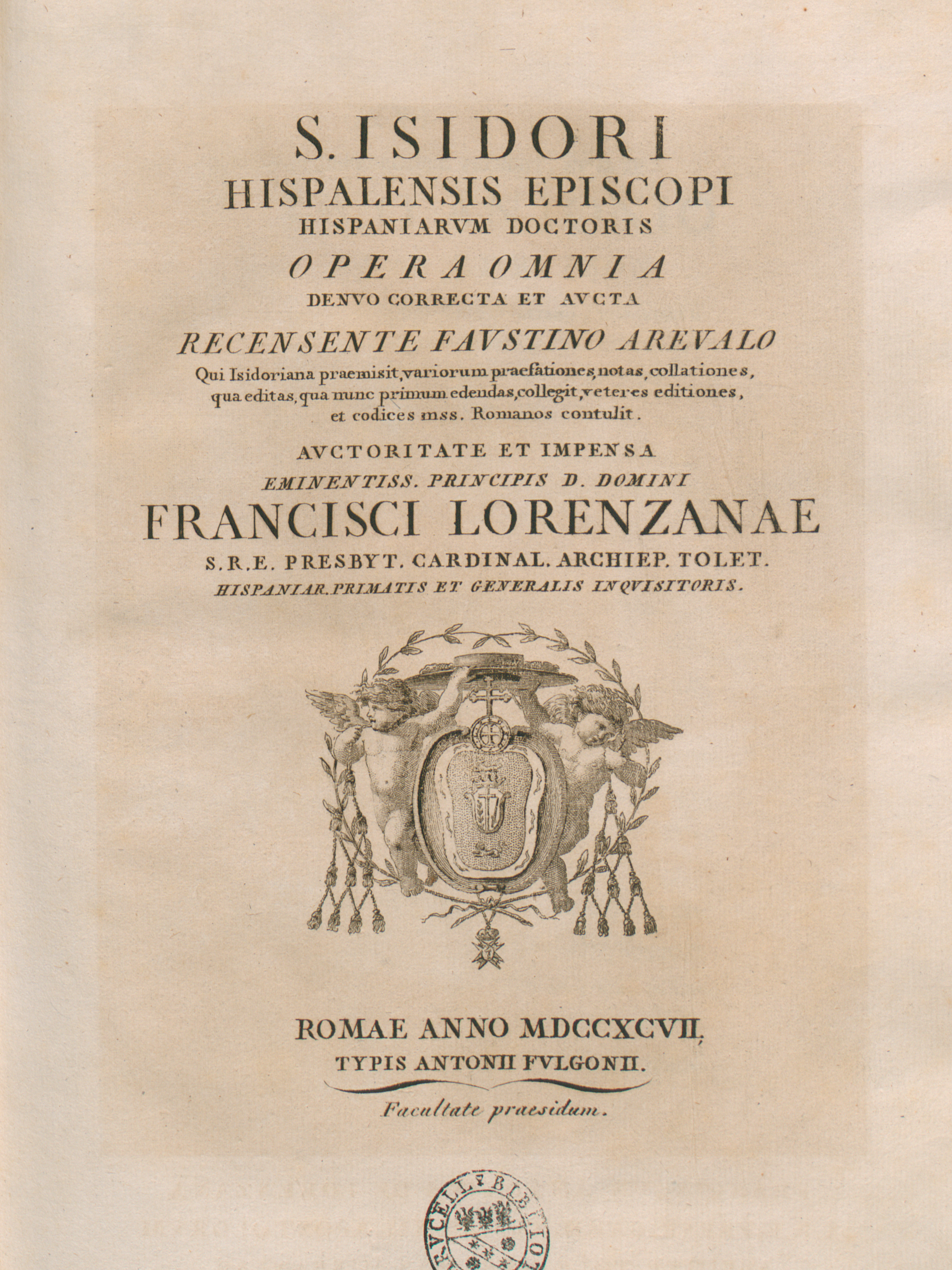
Isidori Hispalensis Opera Omnia (1797)

Isidore was the first Christian writer to try to compile a summa of universal knowledge, in his most important work, the Etymologiae (taking its title from the method he uncritically used in the transcription of his era's knowledge). It is also known by classicists as the Origines (the standard abbreviation being Orig.). This encyclopedia—the first such Christian epitome—formed a huge compilation of 448 chapters in 20 volumes.

In it, Isidore entered his own terse digest of Roman handbooks, miscellanies and compendia. He continued the trend towards abridgements and summaries that had characterised Roman learning in late antiquity. In the process, many fragments of classical learning are preserved that otherwise would have been hopelessly lost; "in fact, in the majority of his works, including the Origines, he contributes little more than the mortar which connects excerpts from other authors, as if he was aware of his deficiencies and had more confidence in the stilus maiorum than his own", his translator Katherine Nell MacFarlane remarks.

Some of these fragments were lost in the first place because Isidore's work was so highly regarded—Braulio called it quaecunque fere sciri debentur, "practically everything that it is necessary to know"—that it superseded the use of many individual works of the classics themselves, which were not recopied and have therefore been lost: "all secular knowledge that was of use to the Christian scholar had been winnowed out and contained in one handy volume; the scholar need search no further".

Book VIII of the Etymologiae covers religion, including the Christian Church, Judaism, heretical sects, pagan philosophers, sibyls, and magi. In this section, Isidore documents pre-Christian religious and magical beliefs, preserving knowledge about ancient magical practices, even while condemning them as superstition. His writings serve as one of the few surviving records of magical thought in early medieval Europe, helping to transmit classical esoteric ideas into the Middle Ages.

The fame of this work imparted a new impetus to encyclopedic writing, which bore abundant fruit in the subsequent centuries of the Middle Ages. It was the most popular compendium in medieval libraries. It was printed in at least ten editions between 1470 and 1530, showing Isidore's continued popularity in the Renaissance. Until the 12th century brought translations from Arabic sources, Isidore transmitted what western Europeans remembered of the works of Aristotle and other Greeks, although he understood only a limited amount of Greek. The Etymologiae was much copied, particularly into medieval bestiaries.

=== On the Catholic Faith against the Jews ===
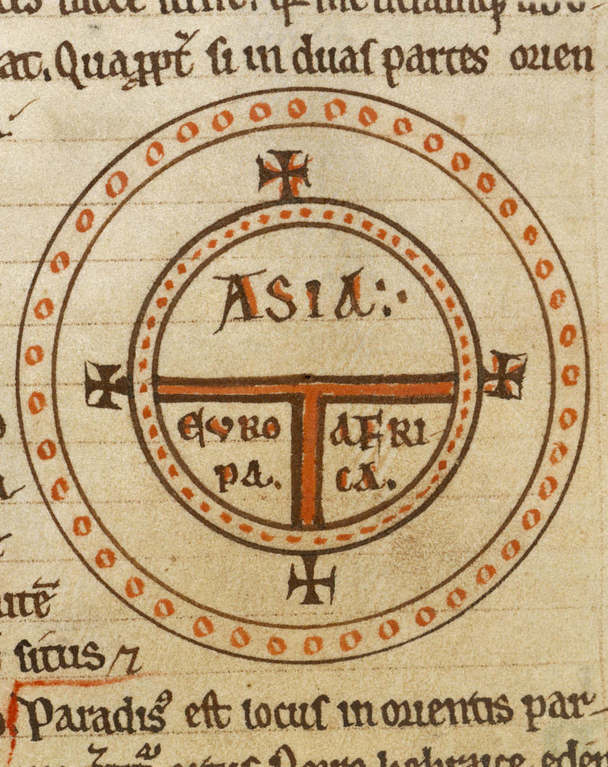
The medieval T-O map represents the inhabited world as described by Isidore in his Etymologiae

Isidore's De fide catholica contra Iudaeos furthers Augustine of Hippo's ideas on the Jewish presence in the Christian society of the ancient world. Like Augustine, Isidore held an acceptance of the Jewish presence as necessary to society because of their expected role in the anticipated Second Coming of Christ.

But Isidore had access to Augustine's works, out of which one finds more than forced acceptance of but rather broader reasons than just an endtime role for Jews in society:

[D]iversities in the manners, laws, and institutions whereby earthly peace is secured and maintained [are not scrupled in the heavenly city for which we strive, while its citizens sojourn on earth], but recognizing that, however various they are, they all tend to one and the same end of earthly peace.

[The heavenly city] is therefore so far from rescinding and abolishing these diversities, that it even preserves and adopts them, so long only as no hindrance to the worship of the one supreme and true God is thus introduced...and makes this earthly peace bear upon the peace of heaven; for this alone can be truly called and esteemed the peace of the reasonable creatures, consisting as it does in the perfectly ordered and harmonious enjoyment of God and of one another in God. (City of God, Book 19, Chapter 17)

According to Jeremy Cohen, Isidore exceeds the anti-rabbinic polemics of earlier theologians by criticising Jewish practice as deliberately disingenuous in De fide catholica contra Iudaeos.

But once again Isidore's same predecessor, Augustine, seems to have written of at least the possibility of Jewish rabbinical practice along that subject's content's purportedly deceptive lines in the same work cited above:

They say that it is not credible that the seventy translators [of the Septuagint] who simultaneously and unanimously produced one rendering, could have erred, or, in a case in which no interest of theirs was involved, could have falsified their translation, but that the Jews, envying us our translation of their Law and Prophets, have made alterations in their texts to undermine the authority of ours. (City of God, Book 15, Chapter 11)

He contributed two decisions to the Fourth Council of Toledo: Canon 60 calling for the forced removal of children from parents practising Crypto-Judaism and their education by Christians on the basis that while their parents were concealing themselves under the guise of Christians, they had presumably allowed their children to be baptised with intent to deceive. This removal was an exception to the general rule of the treatment of Jewish children according to the 13th-century Summa Theologica, "[I]t was never the custom of the Church to baptize the children of Jews against the will of their parents...."

He also contributed Canon 65, thought to forbid Jews and Christians of Jewish origin from holding public office.

=== Other works ===
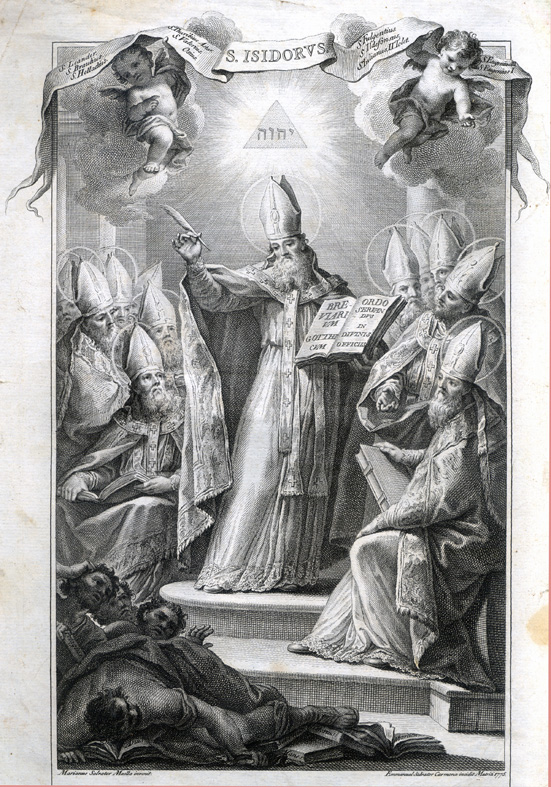
Engraving by Manuel Salvador Carmona, 1778

Isidore's authored more than a dozen major works on various topics including mathematics, holy scripture, and monastic life, all in Latin:

- Historia de regibus Gothorum, Vandalorum et Suevorum, a history of the Gothic, Vandal and Suebi kings. The longer edition, issued in 624, includes the Laus Spaniae and the Laus Gothorum.
- Chronica Majora, a universal history
- De differentiis verborum, a brief theological treatise on the doctrine of the Trinity, the nature of Christ, of Paradise, angels, and men
- De natura rerum (On the Nature of Things), a book of astronomy and natural history dedicated to the Visigothic king Sisebut
- Questions on the Old Testament
- Liber numerorum qui in sanctis Scripturis occurrunt, a mystical treatise on the allegorical meanings of numbers
- a number of brief letters
- De viris illustribus
- De ecclesiasticis officiis
- De summo bono or Sententiae libri tres
- De ortu et obitu patrum
- Regula Monachorum

== Veneration ==
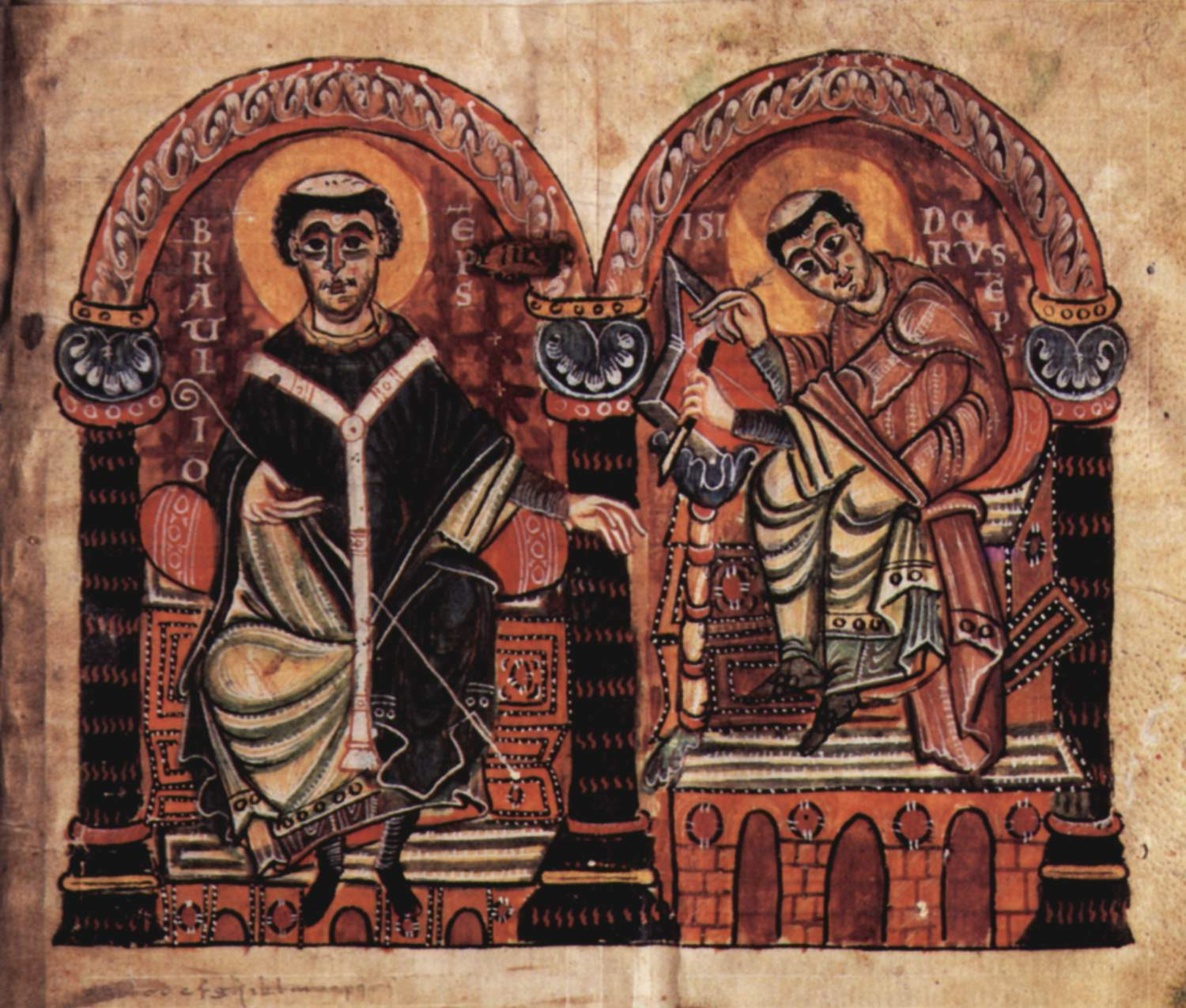
Isidore (right) and Braulio (left) in an Ottonian illuminated manuscript from the 2nd half of the 10th century

Isidore was one of the last of the ancient Christian philosophers and was contemporary with Maximus the Confessor. He has been called the most learned man of his age by some scholars, and he exercised a far-reaching and immeasurable influence on the educational life of the Middle Ages. His contemporary and friend Braulio of Zaragoza said of him: "After so much destruction and so many disasters, God has raised him in recent times to restore the monuments of the ancients, so that we would not fall completely into barbarism".

The Eighth Council of Toledo (653) recorded its admiration of his character in these glowing terms: "The extraordinary doctor, the latest ornament of the Catholic Church, the most learned man of the latter ages, always to be named with reverence, Isidore". This tribute was endorsed by the Fifteenth Council of Toledo, held in 688. Isidore was proclaimed a Doctor of the Church in 1722 by Pope Innocent XIII.

Isidore was interred in Seville. His tomb represented an important place of veneration for the Mozarabs during the centuries after the Arab conquest of Visigothic Hispania. In the middle of the 11th century, with the division of Al Andalus into taifas and the strengthening of the Christian holdings in the Iberian Peninsula, Ferdinand I of León and Castile found himself in a position to extract tribute from the fractured Arab states. In addition to money, Abbad II al-Mu'tadid, the Abbadid ruler of Seville (1042–1069), agreed to turn over St. Isidore's remains to Ferdinand I. A Catholic poet described al-Mutatid placing a brocaded cover over Isidore's sarcophagus, and remarked, "Now you are leaving here, revered Isidore. You know well how much your fame was mine!" Ferdinand had Isidore's remains reinterred in the then-recently constructed Basilica of San Isidoro in León. Today, many of his bones are buried in the cathedral of Murcia, Spain.

== Criticisms and contemporary appraisal ==
Contemporary researchers have criticised Isidore—specifically, his work in the Etymologies. The historian Sandro D'Onofrio has argued that "job consisted here and there of restating, recapitulating, and sometimes simply transliterating both data and theories that lacked research and originality".

In this view, Isidore—considering the large popularity his works enjoyed during the Middle Ages and the founding role he had in Scholasticism—would be less a brilliant thinker than a Christian gatekeeper making etymologies fit into the Christian worldview. "[H]e prescribed what they should mean," asserts D'Onofrio.

The researcher Victor Bruno has countered this argument. According to him, it was not the meaning of the Etymologies, or of Isidore's work as a whole, to give a scientific or philological account of the words, as a modern researcher would do. "It is obvious that, from a material point of view," argues Bruno, "Isidore's practical knowledge on etymology, geography, and history are considered outdated; his methods, from the current academic and scientific standpoint, are questionable, and some of his conclusions are indeed incorrect. But Isidore is less concerned about being etymologically or philologically right than being ontologically right." In Bruno's view, Isidore, despite living in the 6th and 7th centuries, is an archaic or "traditional" thinker. Being religiously inclined, Isidore would be concerned with the redeeming meaning of words and history, the ultimate quest of religions. The same researcher also found parallels between Isidore's interpretation of the word "year" (annus) and the meaning of the same words in the Jāiminīya-Upaniṣad-Brāmaṇa.

== Honours ==
St. Isidore Island in Antarctica is named for him.

== See also ==
- Saint Isidore of Seville, patron saint archive

== Sources ==
=== Primary sources ===
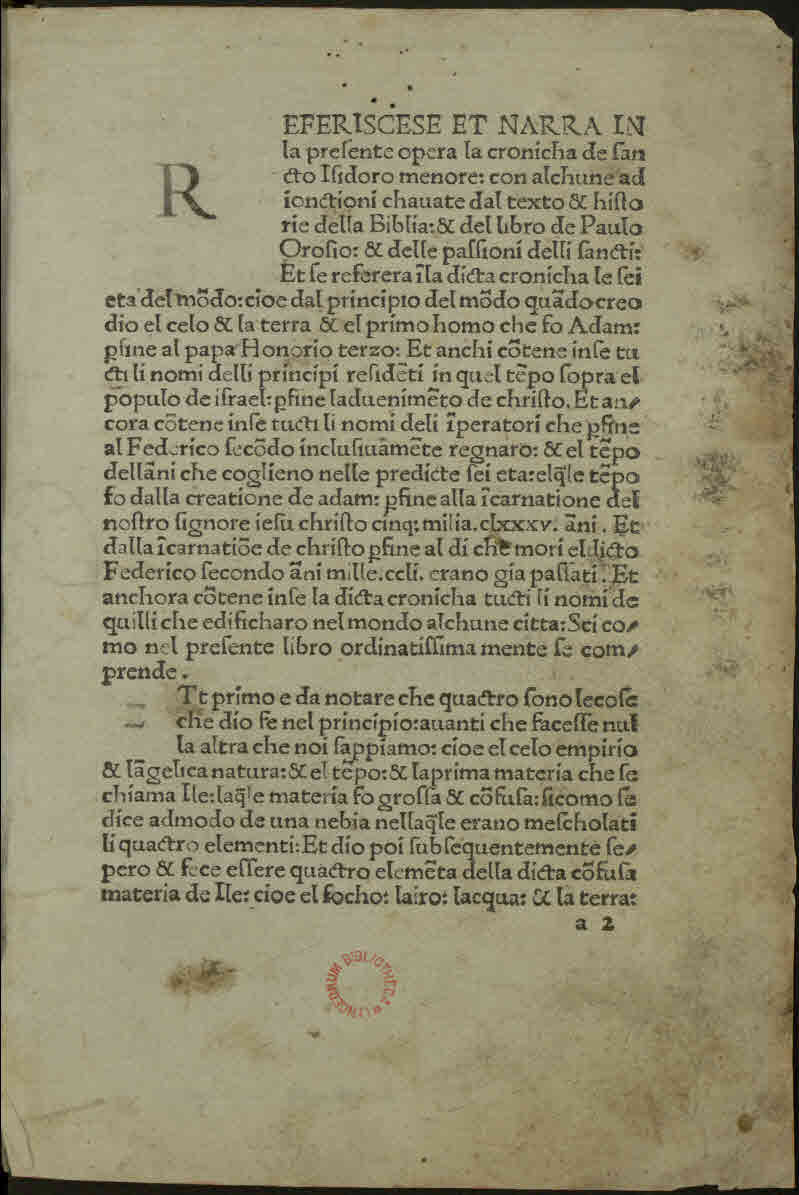
Chronica minora, 1482

- The Etymologiae (complete Latin text)
- Barney, Stephen A., Lewis, W.J., Beach, J.A. and Berghof, Oliver (translators). The Etymologies of Isidore of Seville. Cambridge: Cambridge University Press, 2006. ISBN 0-521-83749-9, 978-0-521-83749-1.
- Ziolkowski, Vernon P., The De Fide Catholica contra Iudaeos of Saint Isidorus, Bishop, Book 1, Saint Louis University, PhD diss. (1982).
- Castro Caridad, Eva and Peña Fernández, Francisco (translators). "Isidoro de Sevilla. Sobre la fe católica contra los judíos". Sevilla: Universidad de Sevilla, 2012. ISBN 978-84-472-1432-7.
- Throop, Priscilla, (translator). Isidore of Seville's Etymologies. Charlotte, VT: MedievalMS, 2005, 2 vols. ISBN 1-4116-6523-6, 978-1-4116-6523-1, 1-4116-6526-0
- Throop, Priscilla, (translator). Isidore's Synonyms and Differences. (a translation of Synonyms or Lamentations of a Sinful Soul, Book of Differences I, and Book of Differences II) Charlotte, VT: MedievalMS, 2012 (EPub ISBN 978-1-105-82667-2)
- Online Galleries, History of Science Collections, University of Oklahoma Libraries High resolution images of works by Isidore of Seville in .jpg and .tiff format.
- De natura rerum (Msc.Nat.1) (On the Nature of Things) digitized by the Staatsbibliothek Bamberg.
- "Lewis E 136 Carta pisana; Sententiae (Sentences) at OPenn". openn.library.upenn.edu.
- "Sententiae (Sentences) at OPenn". openn.library.upenn.edu.
- "MS 484/18 Quaestiones in josue, judicum, regum, machabeis at OPenn". openn.library.upenn.edu.

=== Secondary sources ===
- Barrett, Graham. "God's Librarian: Isidore of Seville and His Literary Agenda," pp. 42–100 in Fear, Andrew T., and Jamie Wood eds. A Companion to Isidore of Seville. Leiden: Brill, 2020. (doi:10.1163/9789004415454_004)
- Henderson, John. The Medieval World of Isidore of Seville: Truth from Words. Cambridge: Cambridge University Press, 2007. ISBN 0-521-86740-1.
- Herren, Michael. "On the Earliest Irish Acquaintance with Isidore of Seville." Visigothic Spain: New Approaches. James, Edward (ed). Oxford: Oxford University Press, 1980. ISBN 0-19-822543-1.
- Englisch, Brigitte. "Die Artes liberales im frühen Mittelalter." Stuttgart, 1994.
- Texts on Wikisource:
  - "Isidorus, archbp. of Seville". Dictionary of Christian Biography and Literature to the End of the Sixth Century (3rd ed.). 1911.
  - "Isidore of Seville". Encyclopædia Britannica. Vol. 14 (11th ed.). 1911. pp. 871–872.
  - O'Connor, J.B. (1910). "St. Isidore of Seville". Catholic Encyclopedia. Vol. 8.

=== Other material ===
- The Order of Saint Isidore of Seville, st-isidore.org
- Jones, Peter. "Patron saint of the internet", telegraph.co.uk, 27 August 2006 (Review of The Etymologies of Isidore of Seville, Cambridge University Press, 2006)
- Shachtman, Noah (25 January 2002). "Searchin' for the Surfer's Saint". Wired. Archived from the original on 24 February 2021.
