= Grimaldo de San Millán =

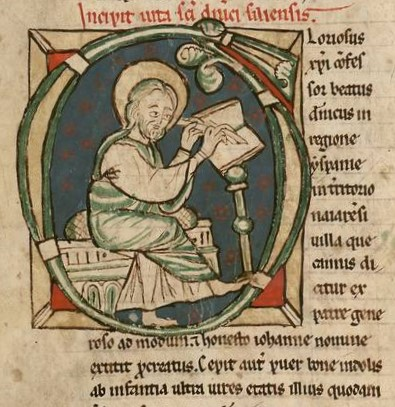
Historiated initial at the start of Grimaldo's Vita in a 12th- or 13th-century manuscript

Preface of Grimaldo's Translatio in a 12th- or 13th-century manuscript

Grimaldo de San Millán (Latin: Grimaldus Aemilianensis) or Grimaldo de Silos (Grimaldus Exiliensis) was a Benedictine monk and hagiographer active in the decades on either side of 1100. (Note: The identification of the two authors named Grimaldo, one of San Millán and one of Silos, is not altogether certain. Martín-Iglesias 2024, p. 39, considers their identification "definitivamente positiva". Vivancos Gómez 2018 considers that the author from San Millán "nada tiene que ver con" he of Silos.)

Grimaldo was a monk of Santo Domingo de Silos and later San Millán de la Cogolla. Nothing is known of his life beyond what can be gleaned from his own works. He may have been one of the monks of San Millán who went into exile with Dominic of Silos around 1040 before the founding of San Domingo de Silos. Some historians have supposed that he was French.

While at Silos, Grimaldo wrote a biography of Dominic of Silos in three books, the Vita sancti Dominici Exiliensis. He wrote at the request of his abbot, Fortunio, Dominic's successor. It was originally composed in 1073–1076. It was revised between 1088 and the death of King Alfonso VI on 30 June 1109. Grimaldo was an eyewitness to much that he recounts. Sometime after 1095, Grimaldo retired from Silos to San Millán.

In 1090, the relics of Saint Felix of Bilibio were moved from the castle of Bilibio to San Millán. In 1109–1110, the abbot of San Millán, Blas, (Note: Martín-Iglesias 2024, p. 38n, following the chronology of Zaragoza Pascual 2000, p. 191–192, makes this Blas the same person who was abbot in 1090. A very different chronology of the abbacy is provided by Peterson 2008, p. 79.) asked Grimaldo to write an account of the translation and of some miracles attributed to the saint. The resulting Translatio et miracula sancti Felicis presbyteri recounts eight miracles, seven that took place at San Millán and one at Bilibio. The miracles date to the period 1090–1098. The date of the work can be fixed rather precisely. It was completed between the death of Alfonso VI and the death or resignation of Blas as abbot, which took place before August 1110. The Translatio and the Miracula are two separate works in the Bibliotheca Hagiographica Latina (nos. 2861 and 2862; the Vita is no. 2238).

== Works cited ==
- Martín-Iglesias, José Carlos (2024). "La Traslación y milagros del presbítero san Felices (BHL 2861-2862)". In Martín-Iglesias, José Carlos; Henriet, Patrick; Esteban Martínez, Carmen (eds.). Hagiografía hispana de los siglos IX–XIII en los reinos de Aragón y Castilla y León: Vidas de santos, hallazgos y traslaciones de reliquias, libros de milagos, himnos. Brepols. pp. 36–43.
- Peterson, David (2008). "Cambios y precisiones de fecha en la documentación emilianense". Berceo. 154: 77–96.
- Valcárcel, Vitalino, ed. (1982). La "Vita Dominici Siliensis" de Grimaldo: Estudio, Edición Crítica y Traducción. Instituto de Estudios Riojanos. ISBN 978-84-7359-168-3.
- Vivancos Gómez, Miguel C. (2018). "Grimaldo". Diccionario Biográfico Español. Real Academia de la Historia.
- Zaragoza Pascual, Ernesto (2000). "Abadologio del Monasterio de San Millán de la Cogolla (siglos VI–XIX)". Studia monastica. 42 (1): 185–223.
