= Bilibio =

Bilibio, also known as Haro la Vieja, was a village in northern Spain located on the northern slope of the Cliffs of Bilibio, where the Ebro River enters La Rioja at Las Conchas in municipality of Haro.

Felix of Bilibio, the teacher of Emilian of Cogolla, lived and died near the town.

Today the area where it was located is known as the Páceta estate, owned by Bodegas Bilbainas.
