= Grimoart Gausmar =

Grimoart(z) Gausmar(s) was a Gascon troubadour of the third quarter of the twelfth century. The sole source of information about his life comes from a satire of Peire d'Alvernhe, which mentions that Grimoart was a knight and jongleur. Only one known poem by Grimoart has survived. The poet names himself in its last lines:

e vec vos del vers la fi, qu'En Grimoartz vos espelha, qu'ab joi lo lass'e l'afina, si.s qui be.l chant ni.l espelha.	and here is the end of the verse, which Lord Grimoart unveils for you, with joy he intertwines it and ends it, if there is anyone who can sing and unveil it well.

Grimoart's work is misattributed in two manuscripts to Jaufre Rudel. The misattribution probably stems from the similarity between the first lines of two works: Lanquan lo temps renovelha by Grimoart and Lanquan li jorn son lonc e may by Rudel. The influence of Marcabru comes across in the poem of Grimoart.

A hypothesis has been put forward that Grimoart Gausmar is a corruption of the name of another troubadour, Guilhem Azemar, which the copyist and later Peire got wrong. It has not received widespread support.

== Sources ==
- Riquer, Martín de. Los trovadores: historia literaria y textos. 3 vol. Barcelona: Planeta, 1975.
