= Grimaldi (film) =

- Directed by: Charles E. Vernon
- Written by: Dion Boucicault (play)
- Starring: Bransby Williams; Sid Kearns
- Production company: Planet Films
- Distributed by: Hibbet Films
- Release date: June 1914
- Country: United Kingdom
- Languages: Silent; English intertitles

Grimaldi is a 1914 British silent historical film directed by Charles E. Vernon and starring Bransby Williams and Sid Kearns. The film is based on Dion Boucicault's 1855 play Grimaldi about the nineteenth century actor Joseph Grimaldi.

== Partial cast ==
- Bransby Williams as Joseph Grimaldi
- Sid Kearns

== Bibliography ==
- Goble, Alan. The Complete Index to Literary Sources in Film. Walter de Gruyter, 1999.
