= Ralph Grimaldi =

American mathematician (born 1943)

Ralph Peter Grimaldi (born January 1943) is an American mathematician specializing in discrete mathematics who is a full professor at Rose-Hulman Institute of Technology. He is known for his textbook Discrete and Combinatorial Mathematics: An Applied Introduction , first published in 1985 and now in its fifth edition, and his numerous research papers.

He was born and raised in New York City and graduated from what is now the State University of New York at Albany in 1964 (B.S.) and 1965 (M.S.), then earned his Ph.D. in Mathematical Sciences in 1972 at New Mexico State University under Ray Mines. He previously taught at the State University of New York at Oswego and has held sabbatical appointments at Clemson University and New Mexico State University, as well as in industry.
