= Grimaldi (play) =

Grimaldi or The Life of an Actress is an 1855 play by the Irish writer Dion Boucicault. It was based on the life of the actor Joseph Grimaldi (1778–1837).

== Film adaptation ==
In 1914 the play was turned into a silent film Grimaldi directed by Charles E. Vernon.

== Bibliography ==
- Goble, Alan. The Complete Index to Literary Sources in Film. Walter de Gruyter, 1999.
