= Braulio of Zaragoza =

Bishop (585–651 AD)

Saint Braulio
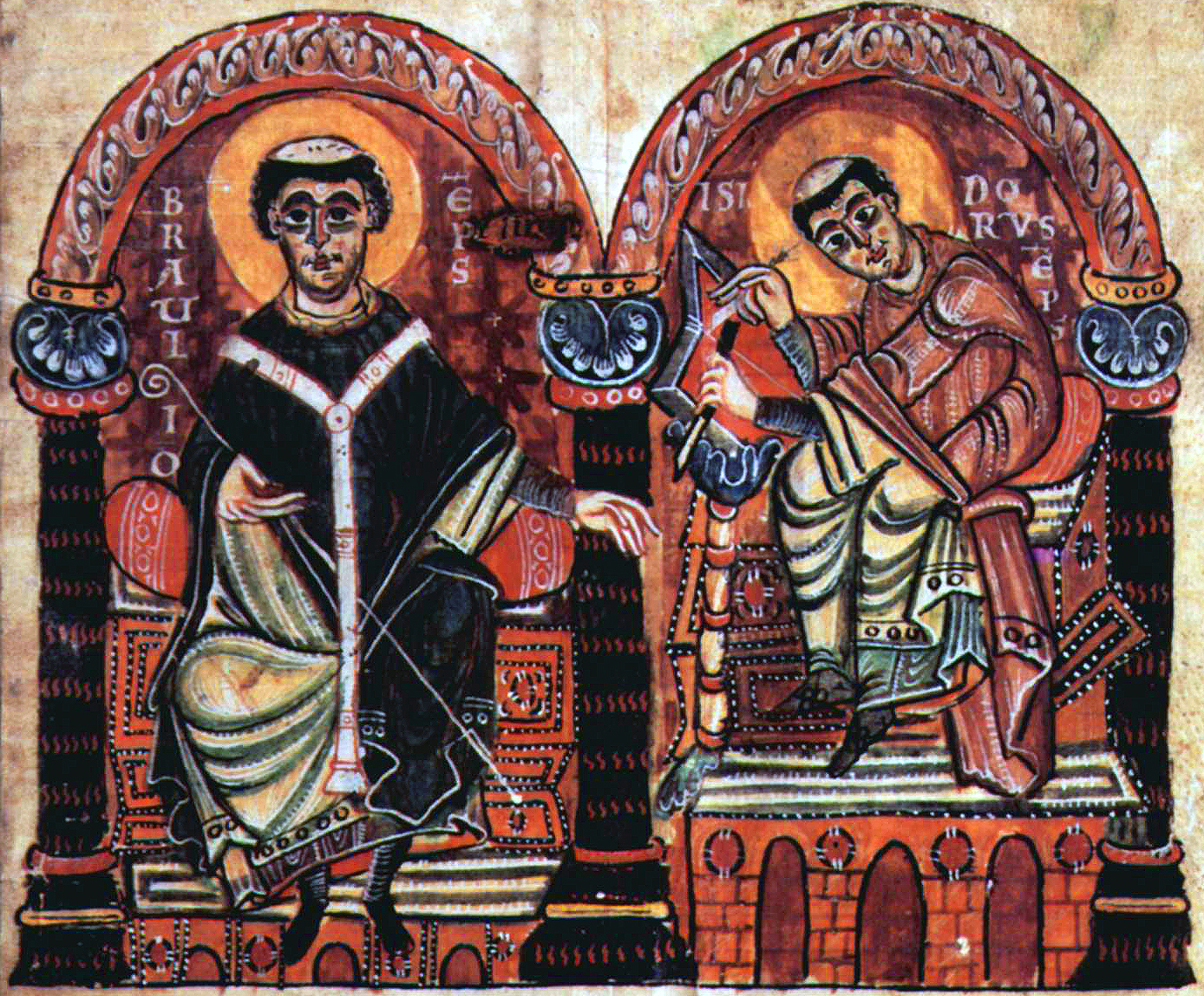
- Braulio and Isidore of Seville. From the Isidori libri originum, 2nd half of 10th century.
- Born: c. 585
- Died: c. 651
- Venerated in: Eastern Orthodox Church; Roman Catholic Church
- Major shrine: Nuestra Señora del Pilar
- Feast: 26 March, 18 March (Spain)
- Patronage: Zaragoza, Aragon

Braulio (Latin: Braulius Caesaraugustanus; c. 585–651 AD) was bishop of Zaragoza and a learned cleric living in the Kingdom of the Visigoths. Both as pastor and writer, he is one of the most celebrated of saints of the Visigothic Kingdom of Hispania that lasted from the 5th to the 8th century.

== Life ==
Braulio was born of a noble Hispano-Roman family. His father, Gregory, was Bishop of Osma. His sister and two brothers were all to hold key posts in the Catholic Church. In 610 Braulio took the habit of a monk, and was later to study at Isidore's school in Seville.

Archbishop Isidore faced a rising threat of Gothic barbarism. His strategic thrust was teaching. Braulio was ordained by Isidore in 624, and joined the clergy serving Seville. The next year, Braulio returned to Zaragoza where his brother John was then bishop, and served as his archdeacon.

Upon his brother's death in 631, Braulio succeeded him as bishop. Known for his personal austerity, almsgiving and preaching, he was an advisor and confidant of several Visigoth kings, including Chindasuinth. The king's son Recceswinth was installed as associate king on Braulio's recommendation.

Braulio worked with Isidore to convert the Visigoths from Arianism. He is said to have encouraged Isidore in his encyclopaedic ambitions, and to have had a hand in the revision of his works. Bishop Braulio, to whom Isidore dedicated it and sent it for correction, divided it into its twenty books. Braulio dubbed it Quaecunque fere sciri debentur, "Practically everything that it is necessary to know".

Braulio was present at the councils of Toledo in 633, 636 and 638.

Braulio responded on behalf of all the Iberian clergy to Pope Honorius I's charge that they might have been neglectful of their duties. One headache was Jews who had been baptised, but who had subsequently lapsed. Whether their handling by the Iberian bishops might have been somewhat lax had been among Rome's concerns.

Towards the end of his life, he lost his eyesight. He was buried in what is now the church of Nuestra Señora del Pilar in Zaragoza.

Braulio was succeeded as bishop of Zaragoza by Taius (Taio), who had been his pupil. He is buried in La Seo Cathedral, Zaragoza, and is the patron saint of Aragon and of the University of Zaragoza.

== Works ==
Several works of Braulio have survived to this day.

- A life of Emilian of Cogolla.
- Forty-four letters, which are not mentioned in antiquity, were discovered in the eighteenth century in Leon.
- Many experts identify him as the author of the "Acts of the Martyrs of Saragossa".
- He may also have written the Passio S. Leocadiae.

== Sources ==
- Thompson, E. A. (1969). The Goths in Spain. Oxford: Clarendon Press.
- Claude W. Barlow (trans.), ed. (1969). Iberian Fathers: Writings of Braulio of Saragossa, Fructuosus of Braga. Washington, D.C.: Catholic University of America Press.
