= David Grimaldi (businessman) =

American businessman and former public official

David Grimaldi (born March 26, 1978) is an American businessman and former public official who served as the Chief Administrative Officer (CAO) of New Castle County, Delaware, from November 2012 to October 2015.

His tenure was characterized by a fiscal turnaround that ended more than a decade of structural deficits, the introduction of the county's first "Open Government" transparency portal, and the launch of its first comprehensive economic development plan.

He currently resides in Newport Beach, California.

== Early life and education ==
Grimaldi holds a Bachelor of Arts degree in Finance from California State University, Fullerton.

== Business career ==
Grimaldi began his career as a Financial Advisor at Morgan Stanley in New York City. He was ranked first in his national peer group across performance metrics and managed nearly $100 million in assets by age 30. During this time, he served as an advisory board member for the Morgan Stanley Children's Hospital.

He later served as Managing Director at China Minmetals, overseeing the U.S. Real Estate Investment Group for the Fortune 500 firm. As President of the Firestone Hotel Group, he managed the multimillion-dollar renovation and rebranding of the former Holiday Inn Wilmington into the Crowne Plaza Wilmington North.

== Entry into politics ==
Grimaldi entered public service as the Treasurer and Chief Financial Officer of the Police Athletic League (PAL) of Delaware, where he worked with Thomas P. Gordon to resolve the organization's financial deficits.

=== 2012 Campaign management ===
In 2012, Grimaldi served as campaign manager for Thomas P. Gordon’s bid to return as New Castle County Executive. The campaign occurred in a highly pressurized environment; Gordon had previously run for the office in 2008 and was defeated by incumbent Chris Coons by a margin of 65% to 35%. At the time of the 2012 campaign, Gordon faced media coverage regarding past legal challenges from a previous administration.

Under Grimaldi's management, the campaign challenged the Democratic Party-endorsed incumbent, Paul Clark, in the primary election. Despite the lack of party support, Gordon won the primary and the general election.

== Chief Administrative Officer (2012–2015) ==
Upon taking office in November 2012, Gordon appointed Grimaldi as the county’s Chief Administrative Officer (CAO), placing him in charge of daily operations for a government with 2,000 employees and a $250 million operating budget.

=== 2013 Fiscal turnaround ===
Grimaldi led a comprehensive effort to stabilize the county's finances, which had seen structural deficits for over a decade. In 2013, the county originally projected a $2 million deficit but ended the fiscal year with an $8.4 million surplus, representing a $10.4 million swing. This turnaround allowed the county to maintain a policy of no property tax increases for four consecutive years. Fitch Ratings noted the county's strong financial management and unrestricted fund balance of $98.6 million at the close of the 2013 fiscal year.

=== Financial and investment reforms ===
- Bond Restructuring: In 2014, Grimaldi orchestrated a bond deal that realized approximately $12 million in savings, the most successful in county history at the time.
- Portfolio De-risking: Grimaldi identified $16 million in high-risk "junk bond" exposure within a $47 million reserve account. He liquidated these holdings and moved assets to direct investments in U.S. Treasuries and investment-grade corporate bonds managed by UBS.
- Pension Management: He restructured the county employee retirement plan to avoid approximately $600,000 in surrender fees.

=== Administrative, ethics, and transparency reforms ===
Grimaldi architected several landmark transparency and ethics policies for the county:

- Open Government and "The Checkbook": Grimaldi launched the county's first-ever "Open Government" platform, which for the first time put the county government's checkbook online.
- Anti-Nepotism Policy: In January 2014, Grimaldi introduced the county's first formal nepotism policy, banning the practice of having relatives report directly to one another.
- Ethics Training and Disclosure: He authored a reform package that implemented mandatory ethics training for all 2,000 county employees and required the disclosure of all family members working for the county.

=== Economic development and technology ===
- Comprehensive Economic Development Plan: Grimaldi initiated and led the creation of the first-ever Comprehensive Economic Development Strategic Plan for New Castle County, launched in partnership with the City of Wilmington in November 2014.
- Website Redesign: He spearheaded a complete redesign of the county website to create a "1st class platform" for technology, including interactive land-use maps for transparency.

== Awards and recognition ==
In September 2015, Grimaldi was named to the "Top 40 Under 40" list by the Delaware Business Times and was featured on its cover.

== Departure and litigation ==
Grimaldi concluded his service as CAO on October 29, 2015. Following his departure, Grimaldi filed a lawsuit against the county. In 2016, the Delaware Superior Court allowed a defamation claim to proceed under the "stigma-plus" doctrine. The litigation was later dismissed in 2018.
