= List of programs broadcast by TVE =

This is a list of programs currently, formerly, and soon to be broadcast on Televisión Española in Spain.

== List ==
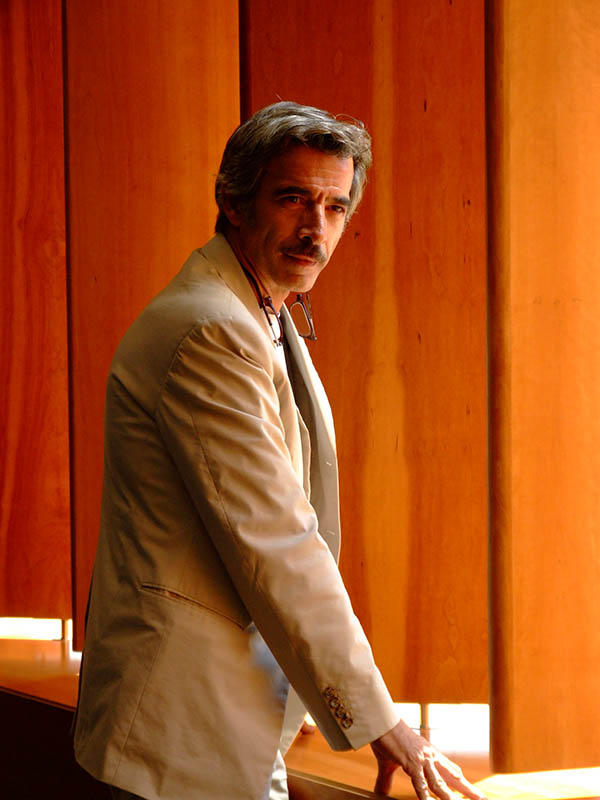
Imanol Arias, actor from Cuéntame cómo pasó

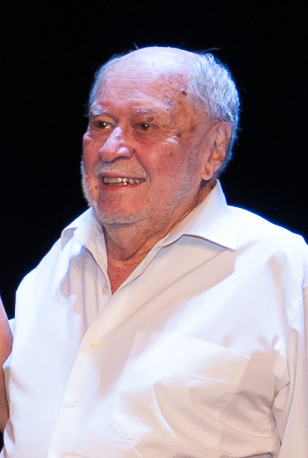
Jaime de Armiñán, writer and director of Tres eran tres

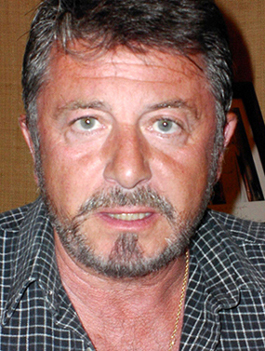
Jaime Blanch, actor from Estudio 1 and El ministerio del tiempo

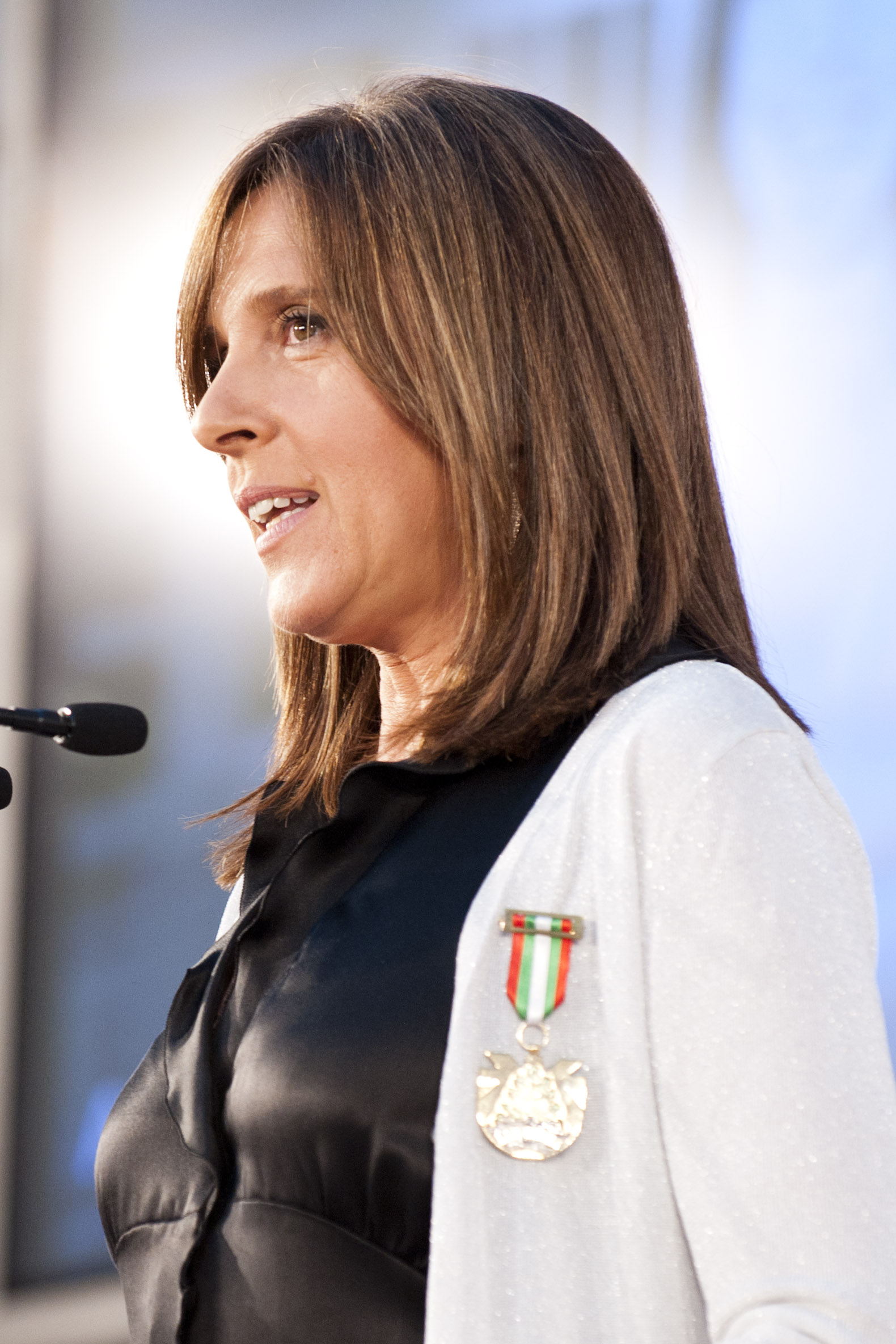
Ana Blanco, news presenter from Telediario

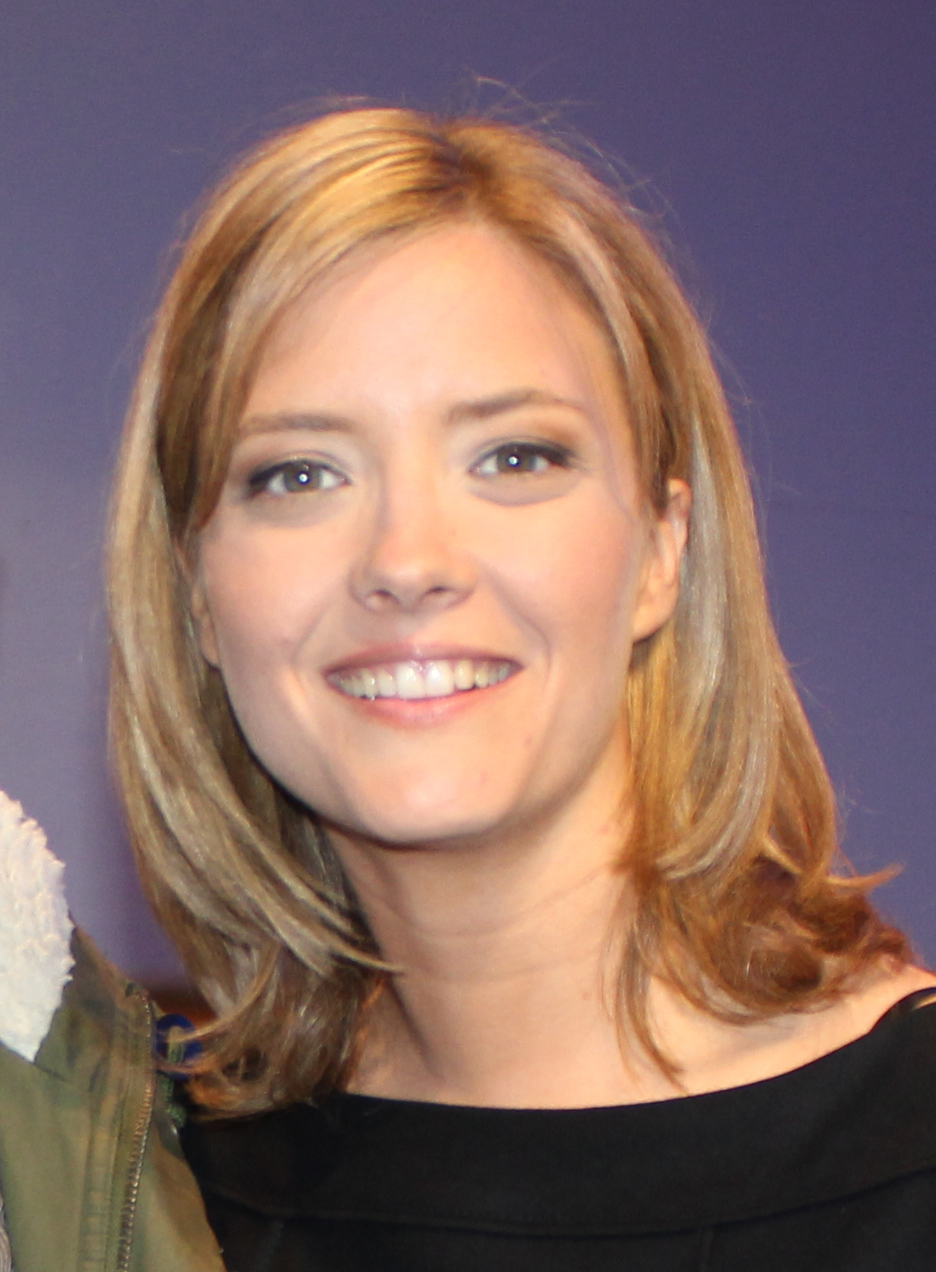
María Casado, news presenter from Telediario

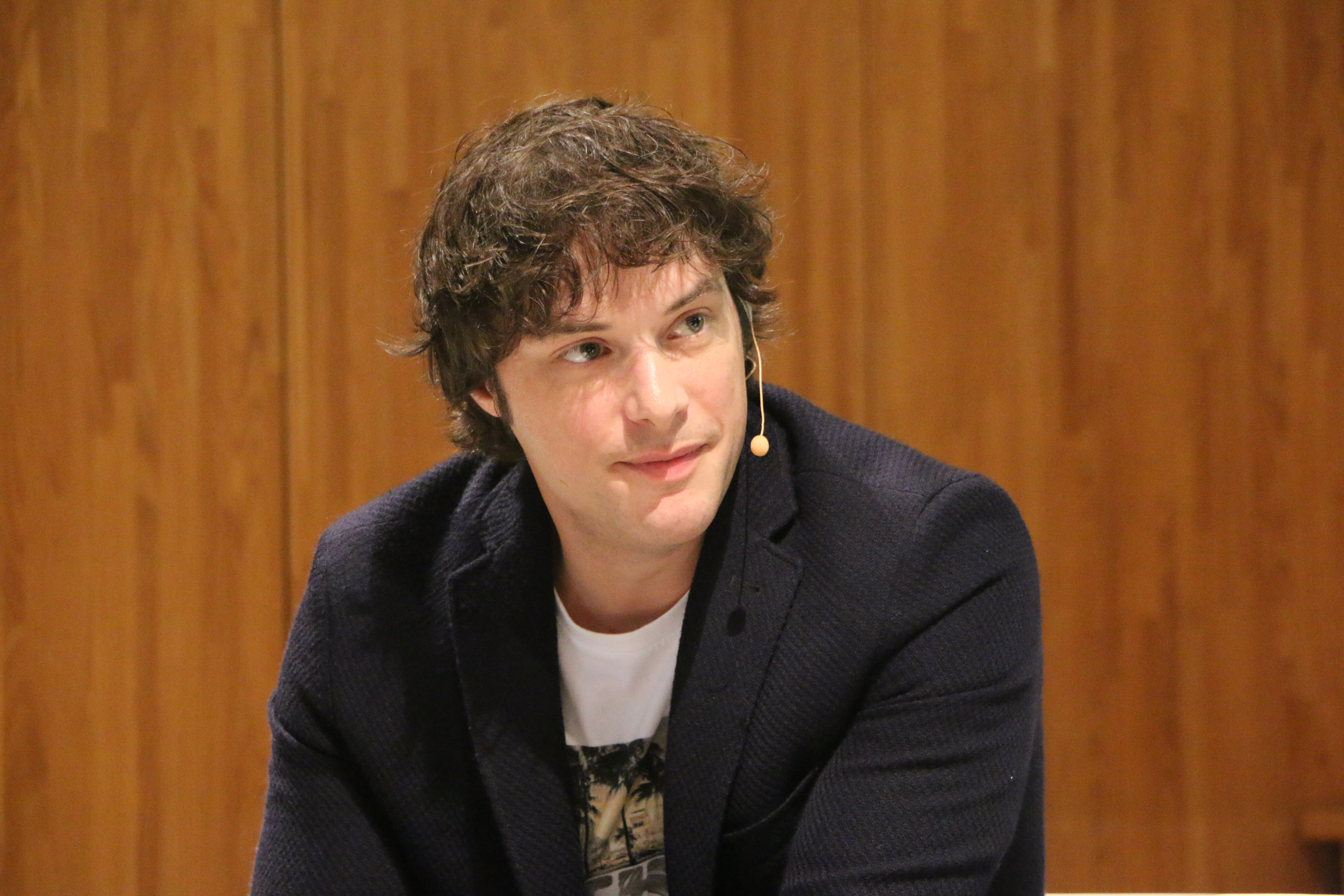
Jordi Cruz, judge from Masterchef

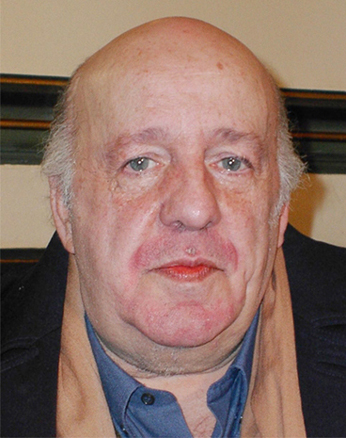
Fernando Delgado, actor from Novela and Hostal Royal Manzanares

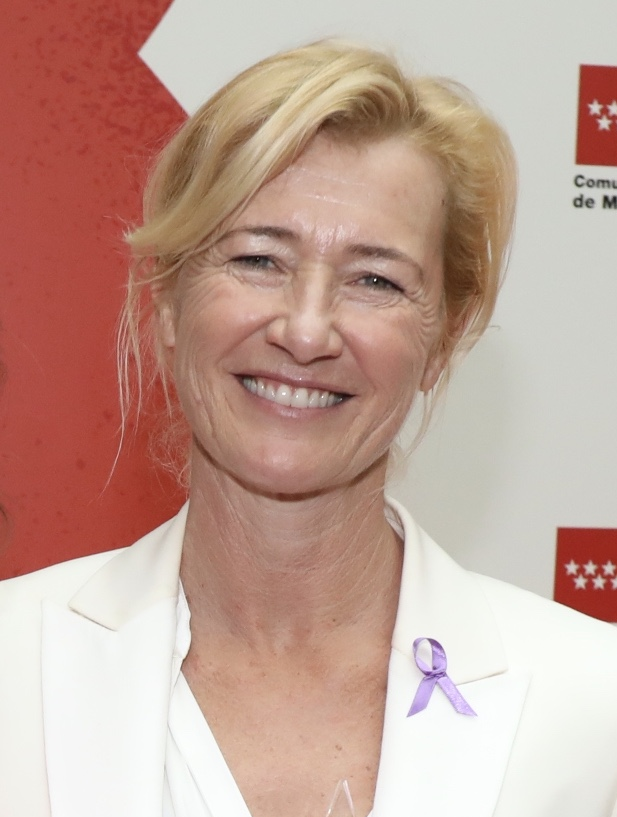
Ana Duato, actor from Cuéntame cómo pasó

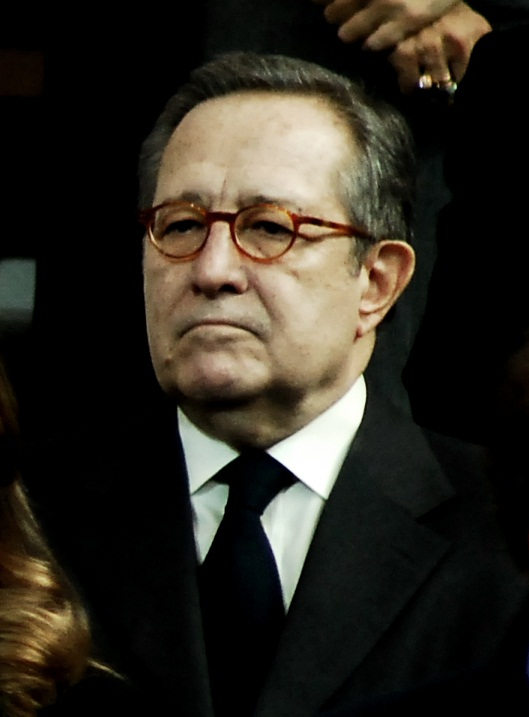
Pedro Erquicia, director of Informe Semanal

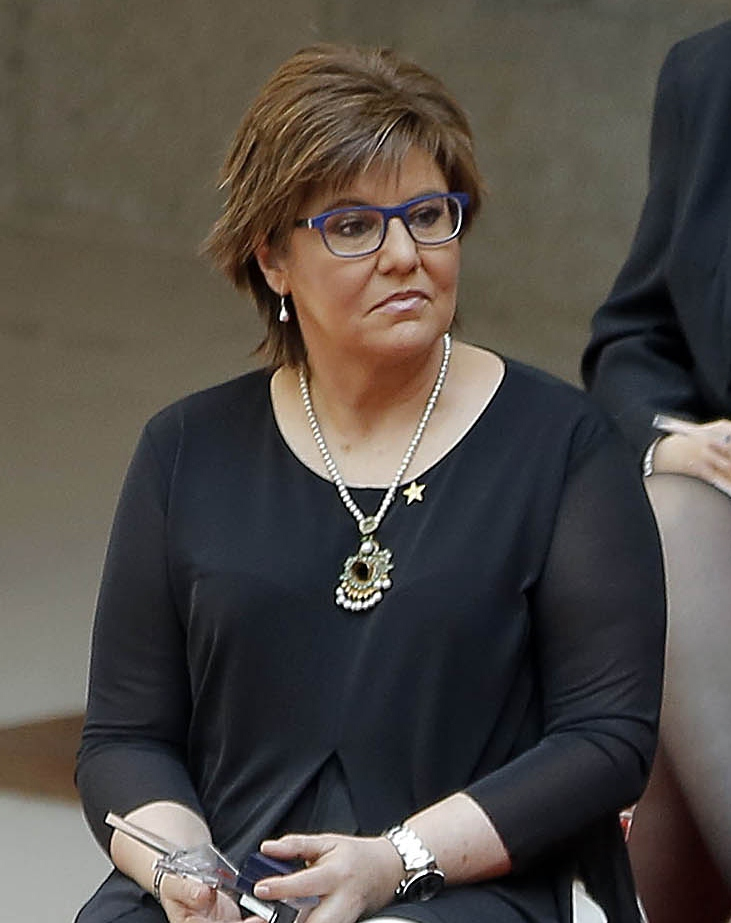
María Escario, news presenter from Telediario

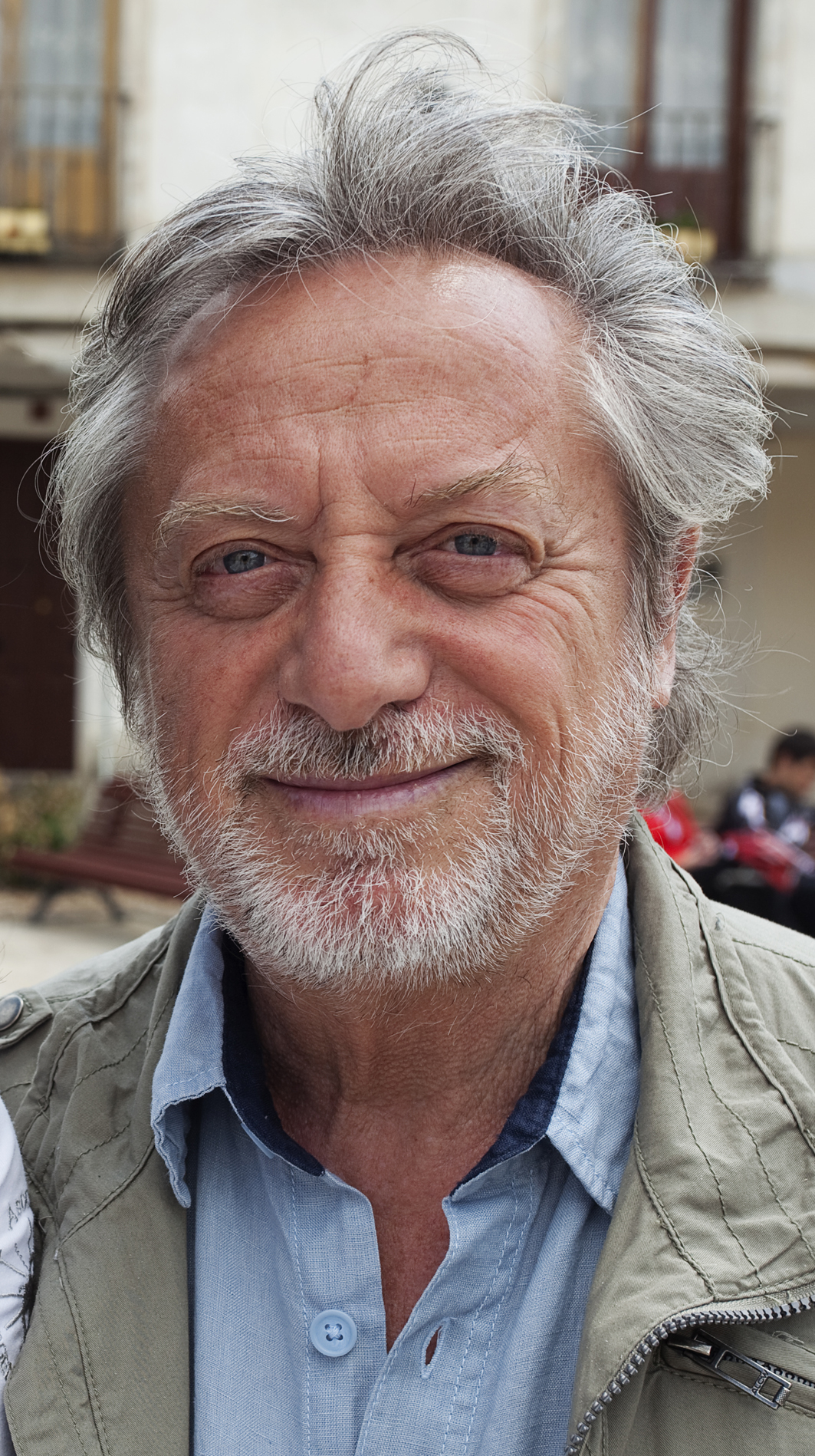
Manuel Galiana, actor from Estudio 1 and Gran Reserva

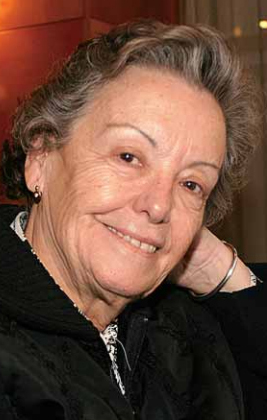
María Galiana, the lead actress from Cuéntame cómo pasó

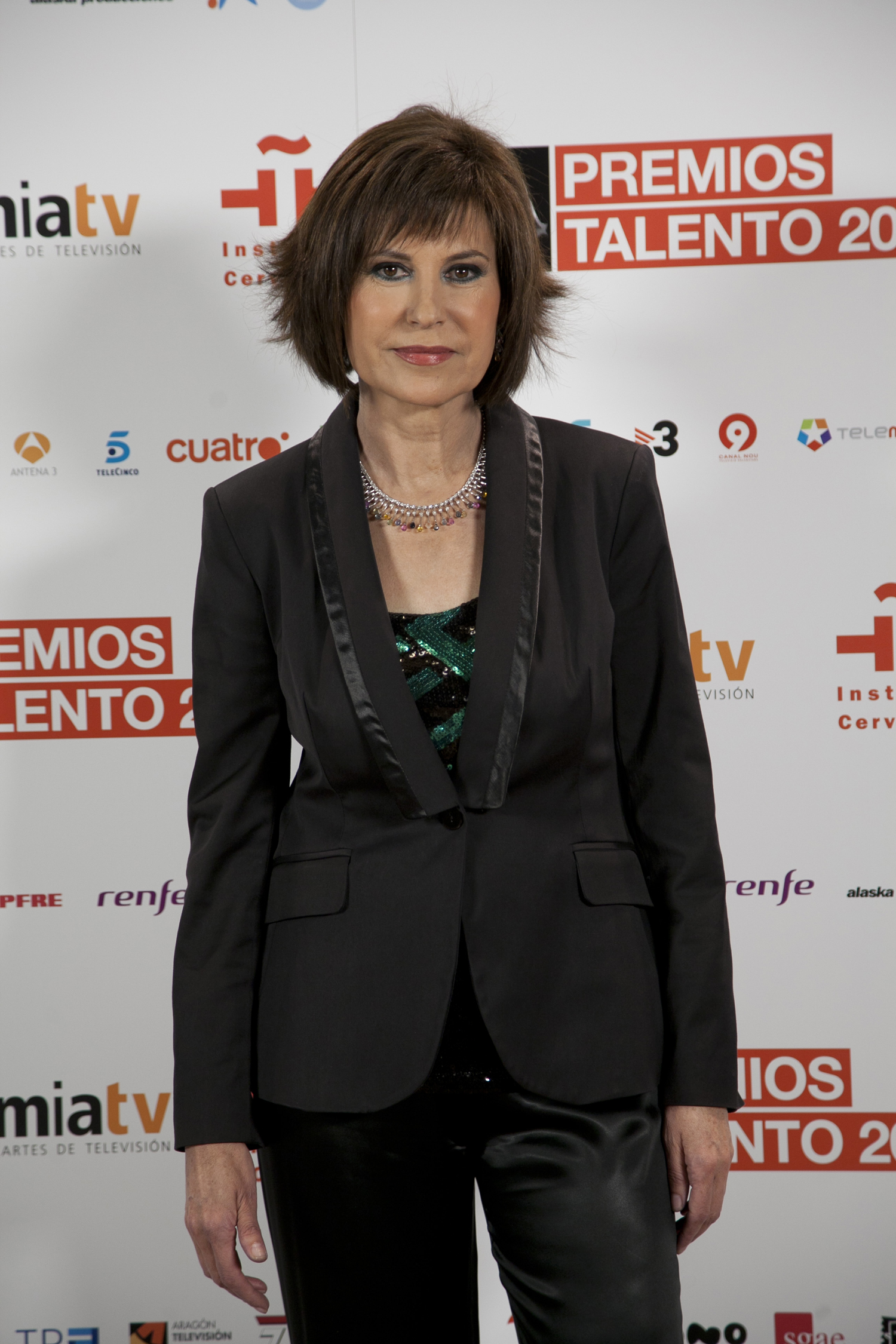
Concha García Campoy, news presenter from Telediario

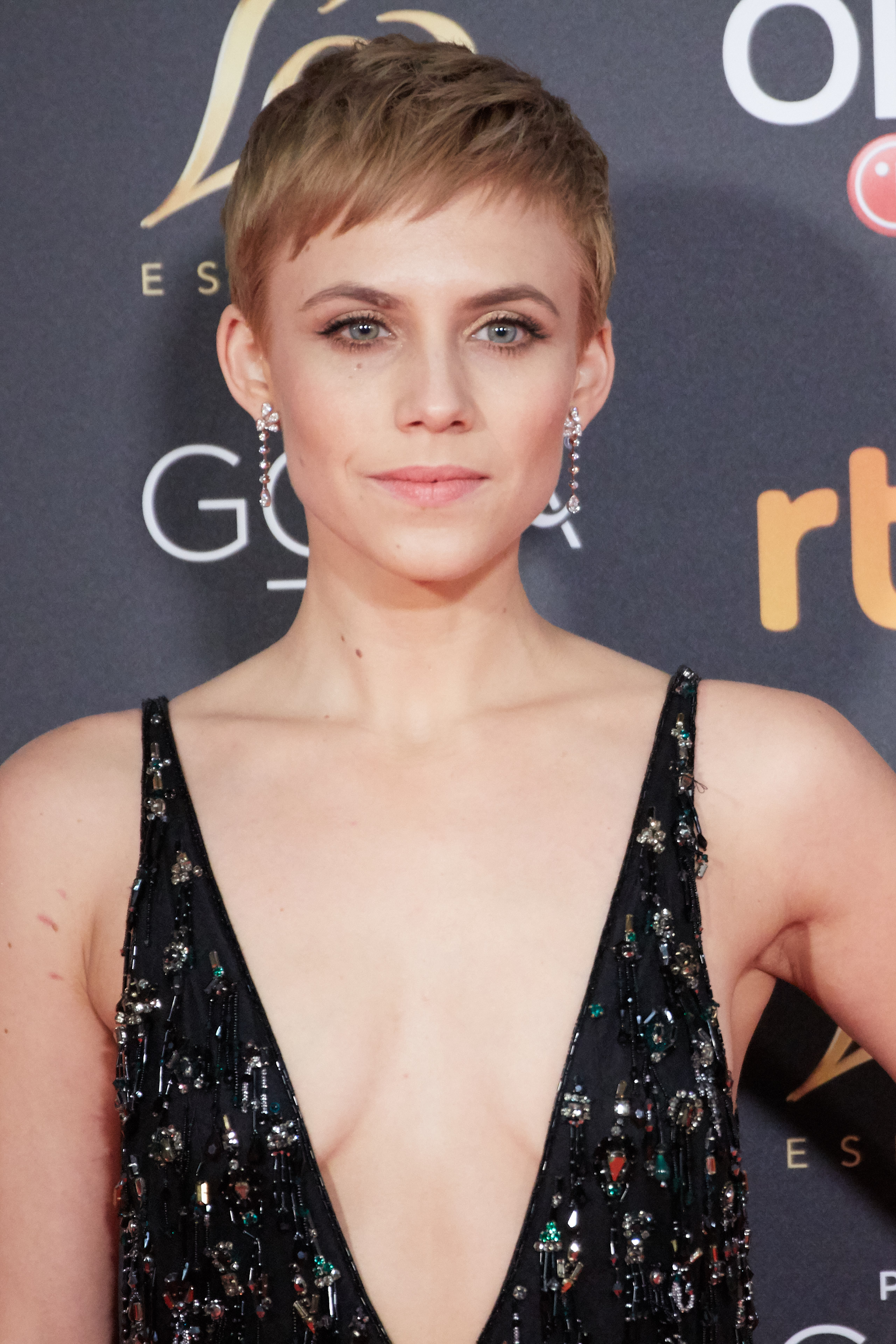
Aura Garrido, actress from El Ministerio del Tiempo.

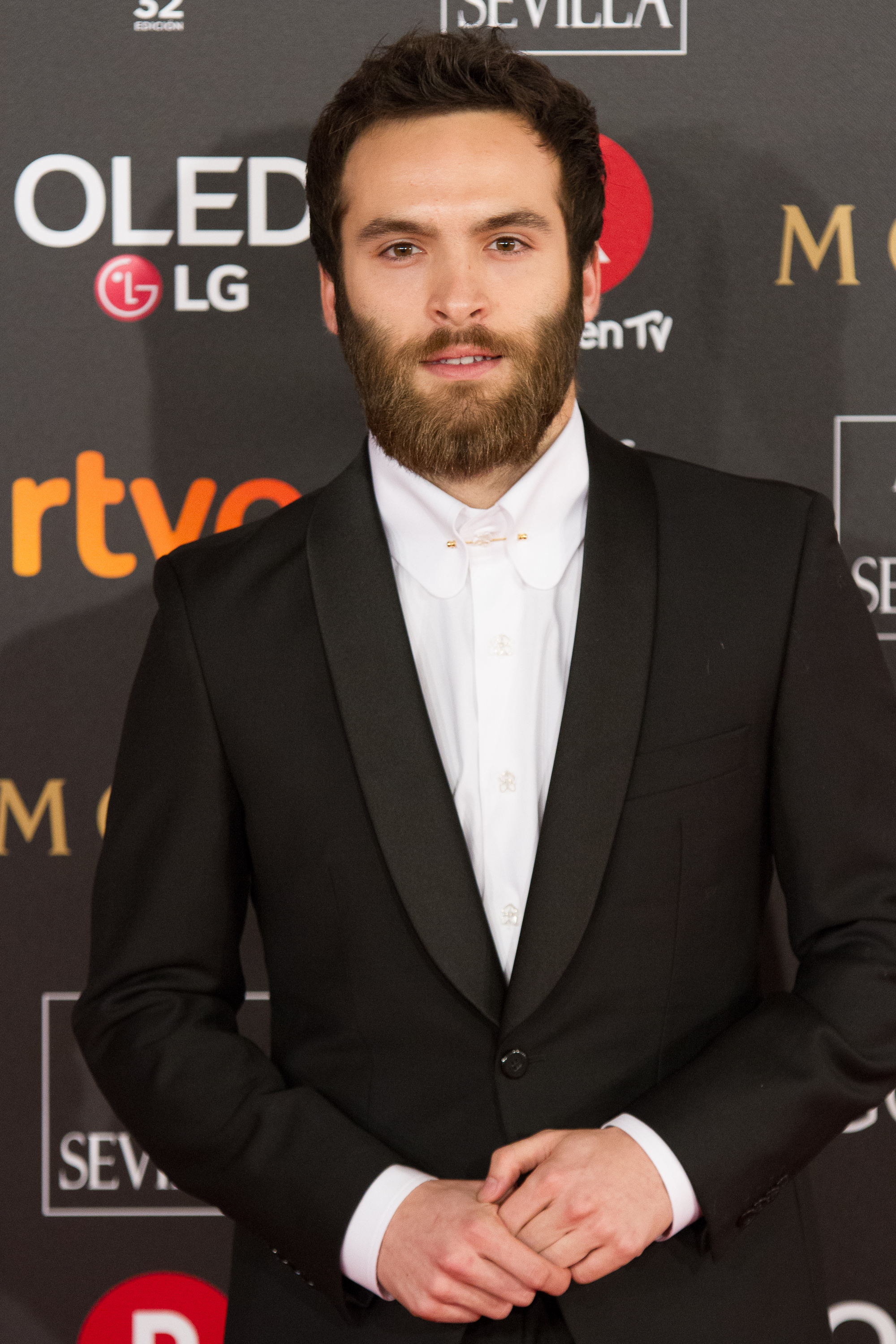
Ricardo Gómez, lead actor from Cuéntame cómo pasó

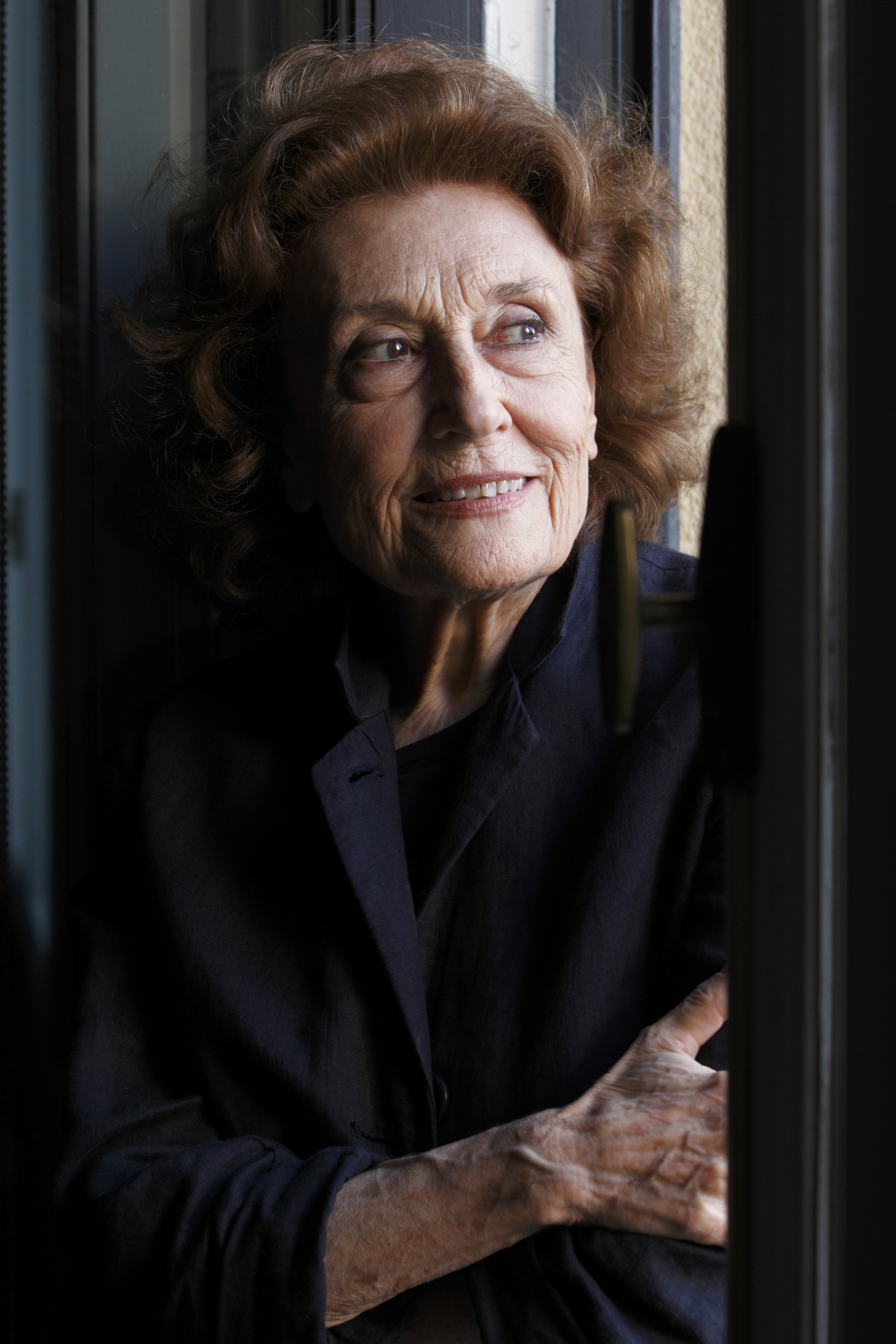
Julia Gutiérrez Caba, long-running actress from Estudio 1

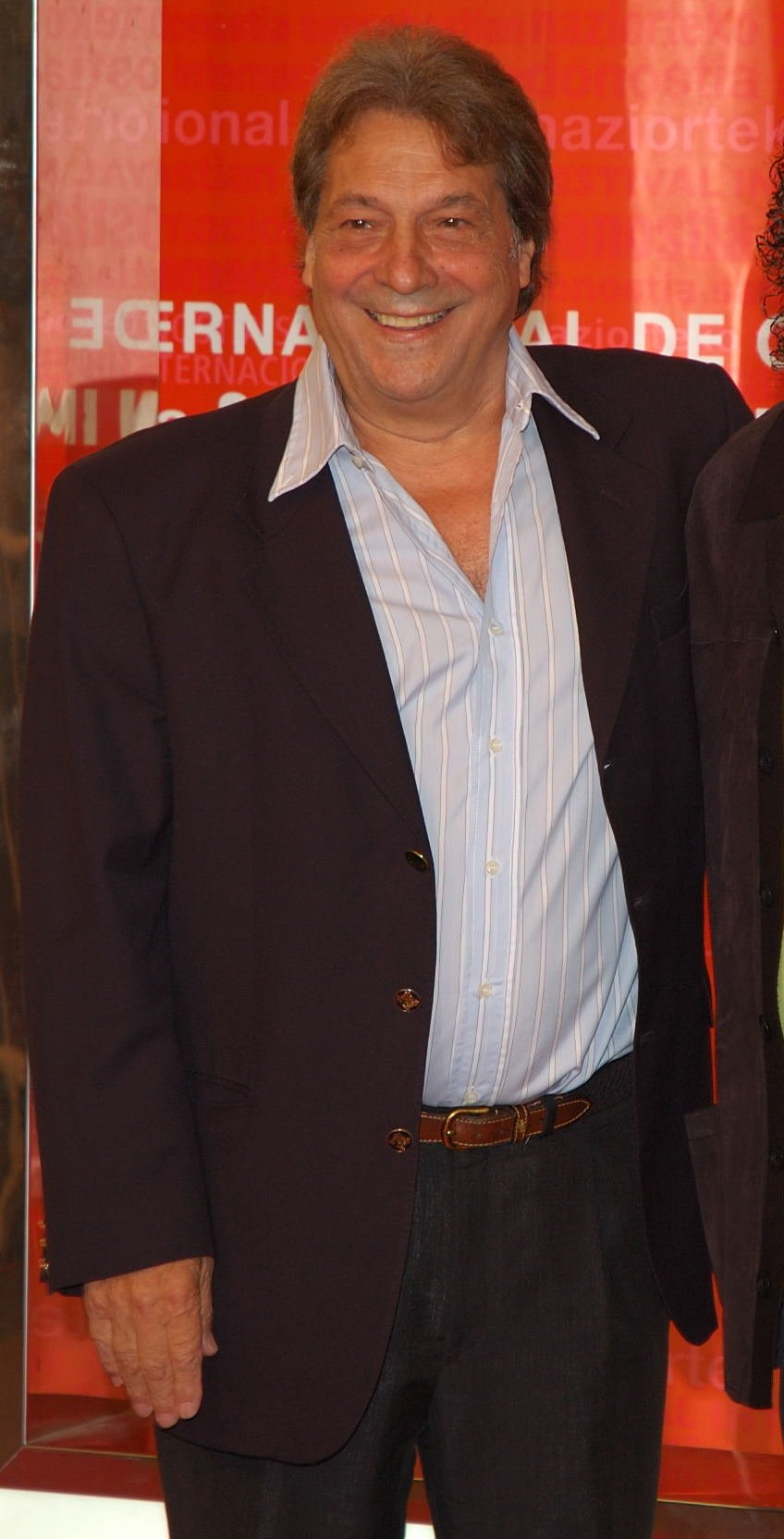
Sancho Gracia, actor from Curro Jiménez

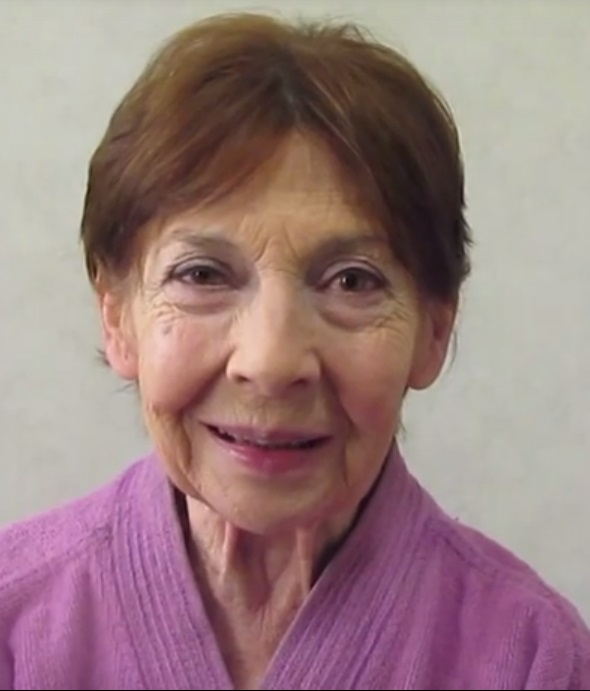
Alicia Hermida, actress in Cuéntame cómo pasó

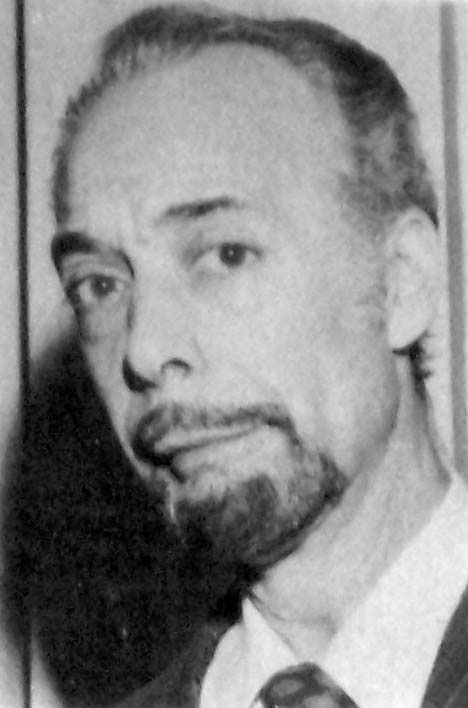
Narciso Ibáñez Menta, actor in Historias para no dormir

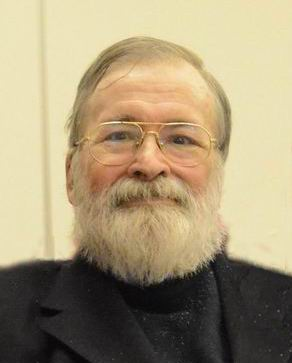
Narciso Ibáñez Serrador, director of Historias para no dormir

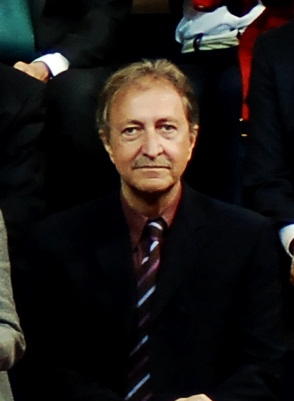
Paco Lobatón, news presenter from Telediario

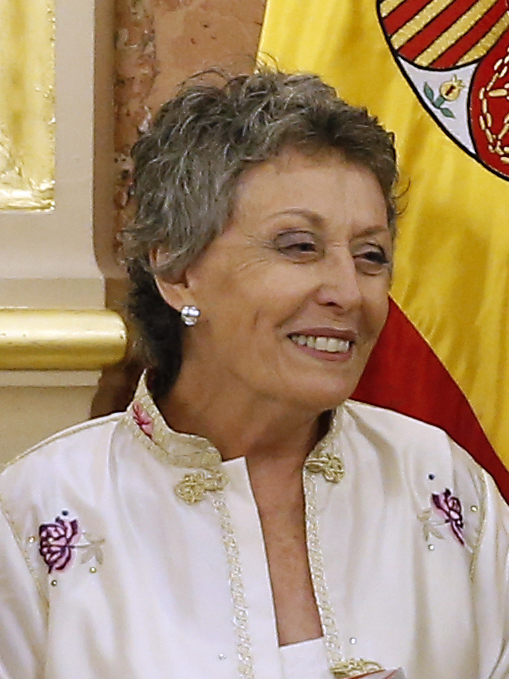
Rosa María Mateo, presenter from Informe Semanal and Telediario, as well as the director of TVE

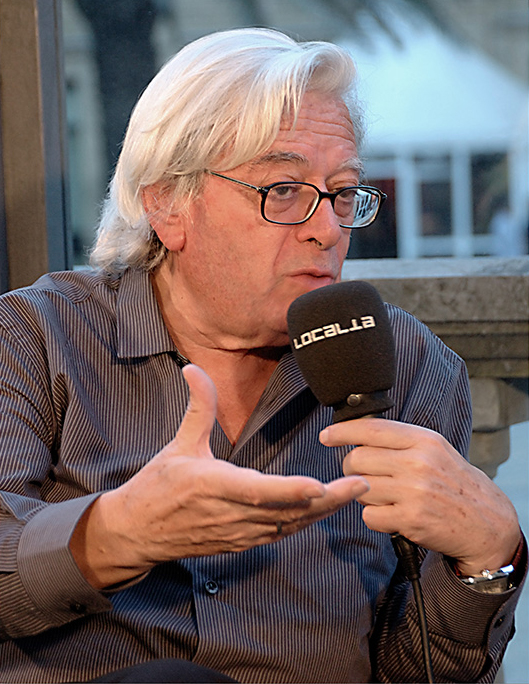
Antonio Mercero, director of Verano azul

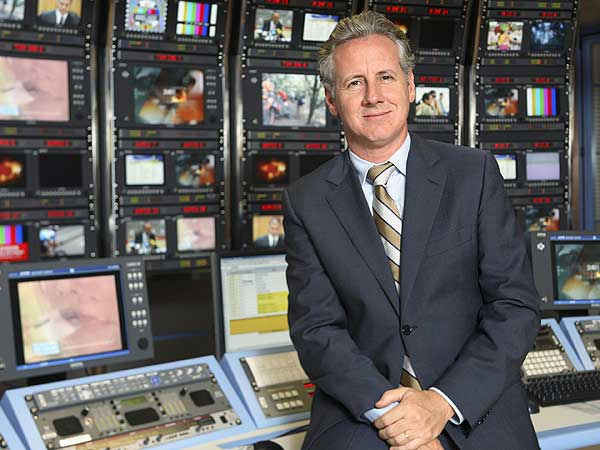
Lorenzo Milá, news presenter from Telediario

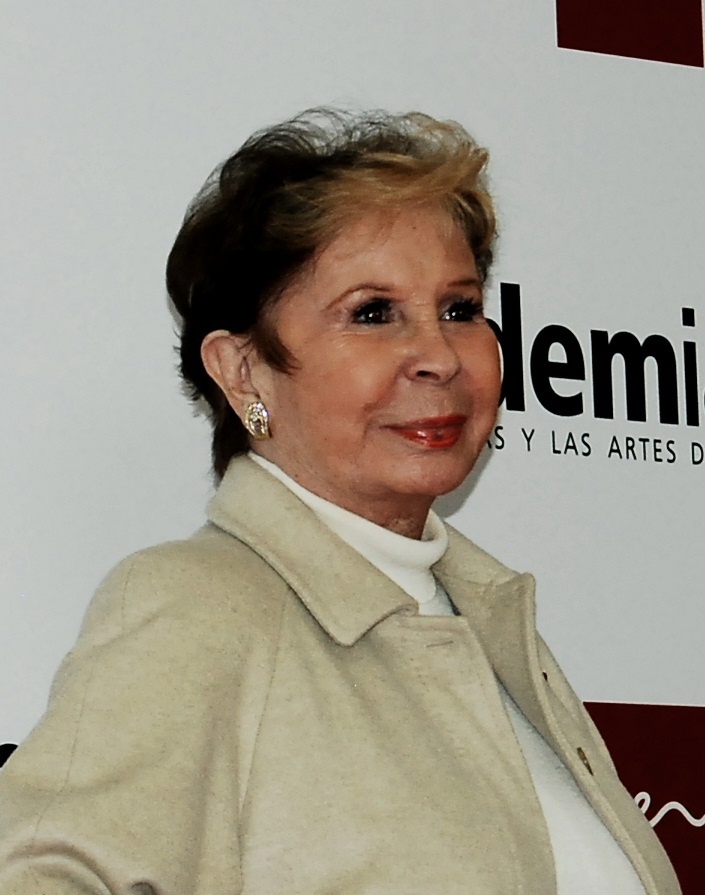
Lina Morgan, actress from Hostal Royal Manzanares

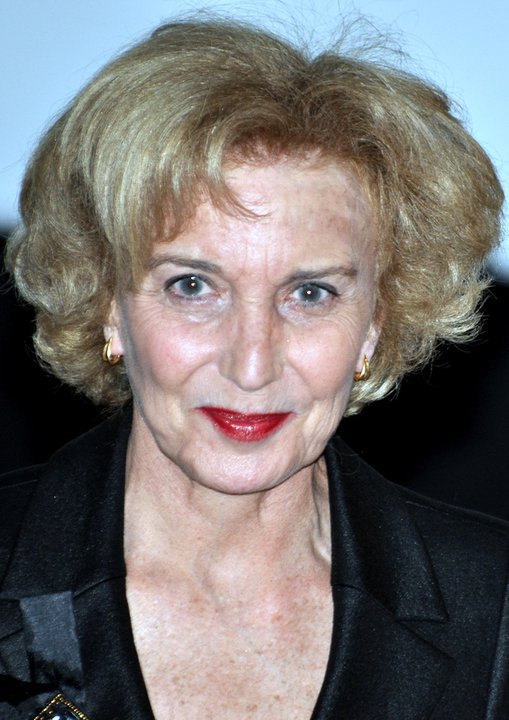
Marisa Paredes, actress from Estudio 1 and Novela

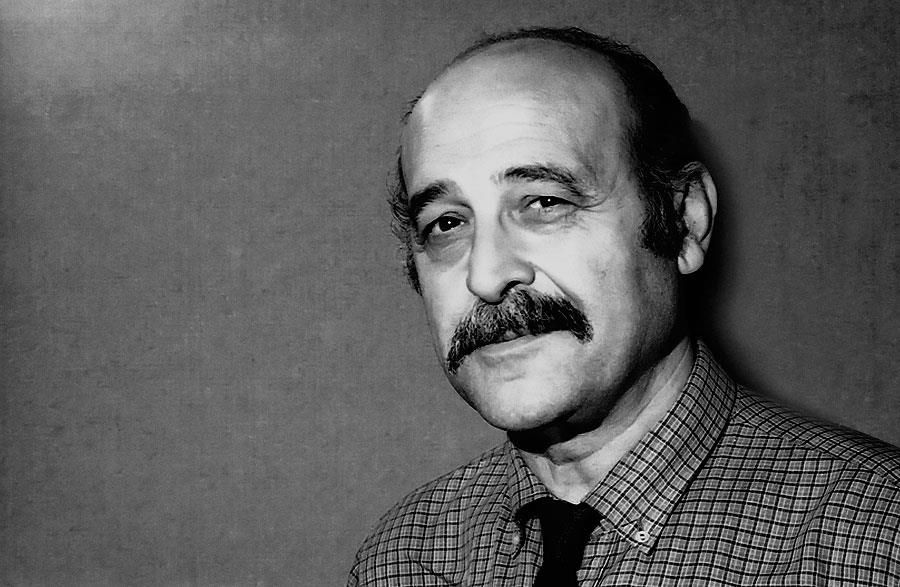
Jesús Puente, actor in Estudio 1

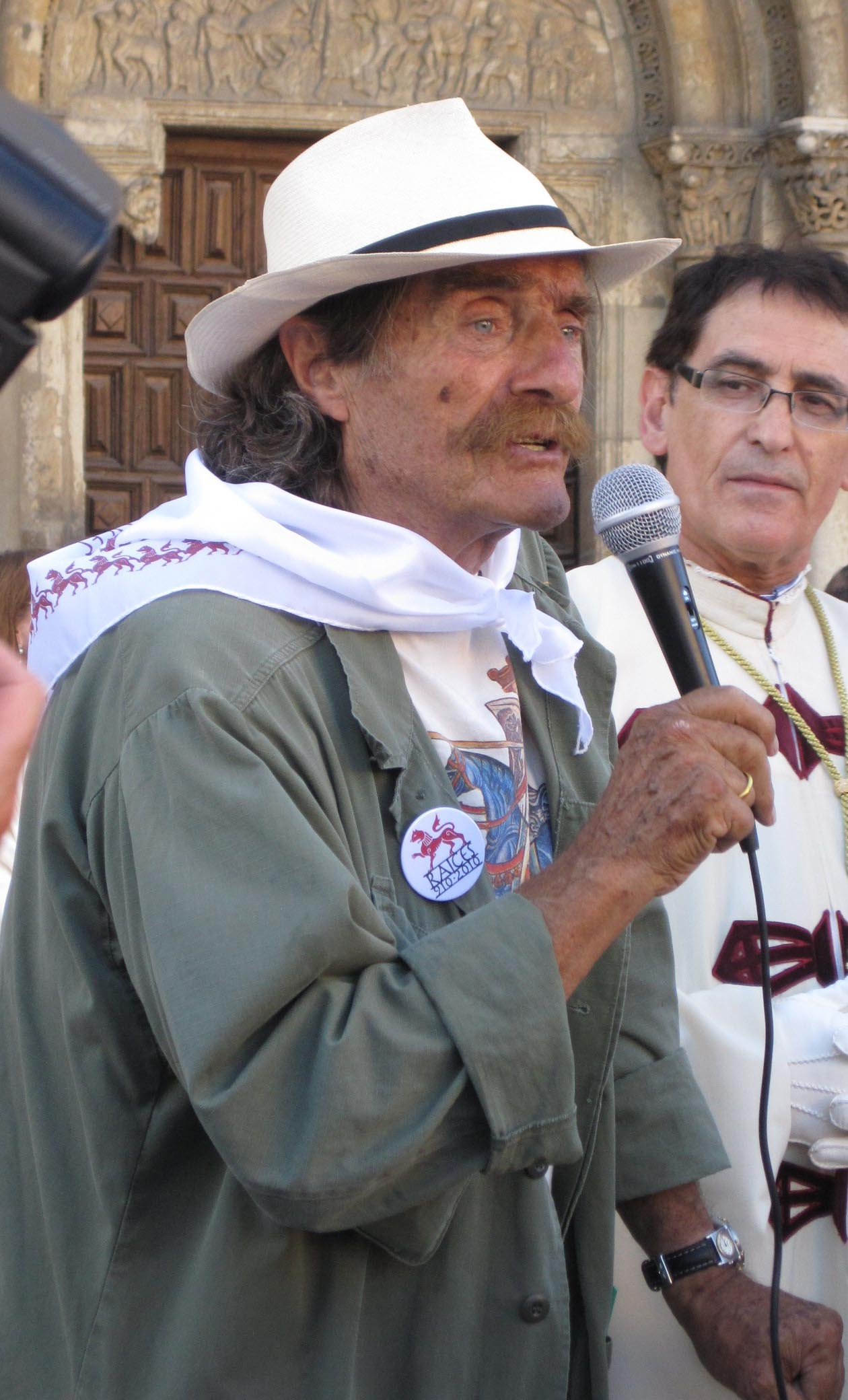
Miguel de la Quadra-Salcedo, presentador from Ruta Quetzal

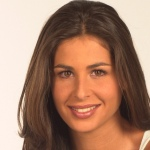
Nuria Roca, news presenter from Waku Waku

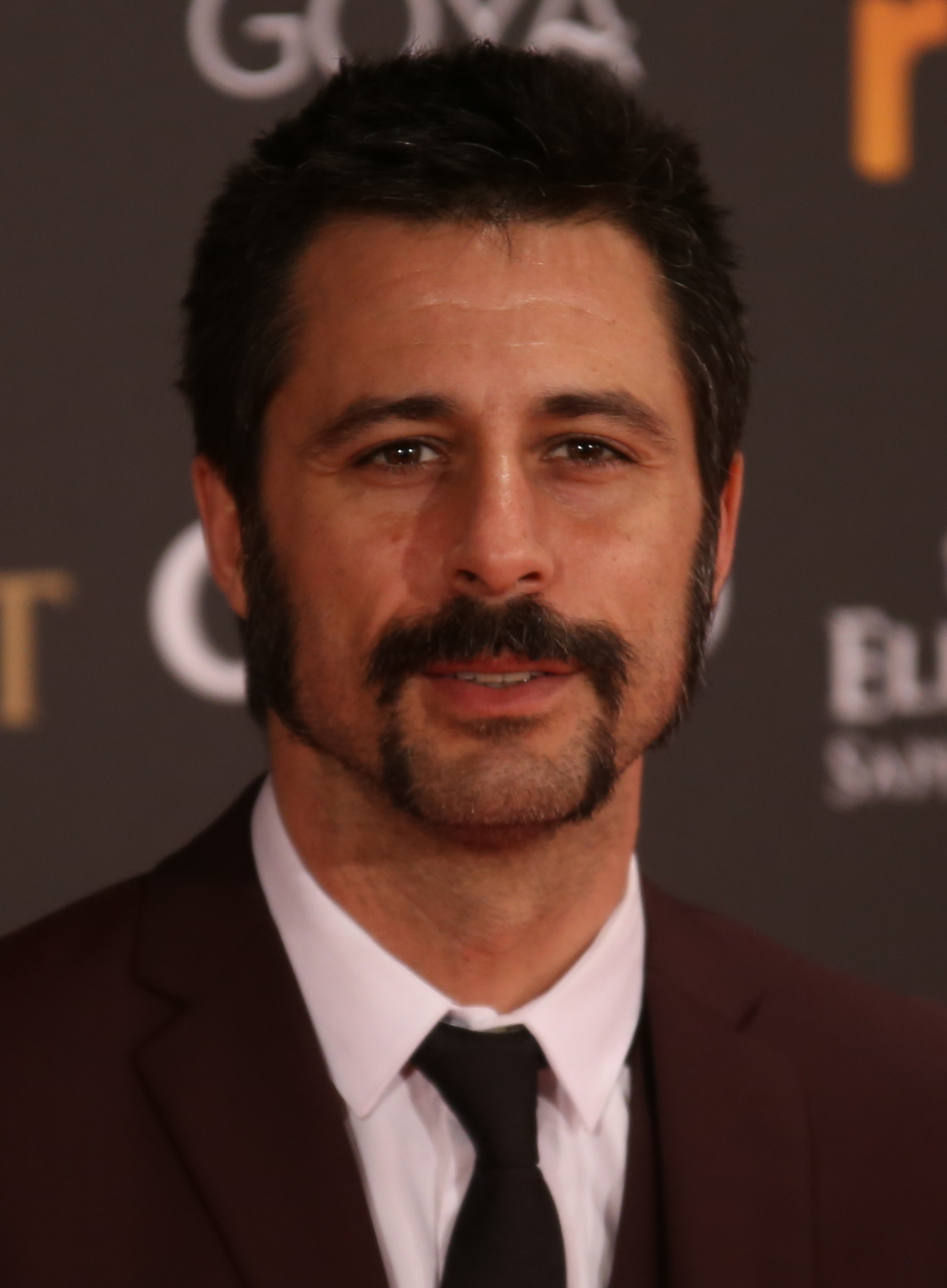
Hugo Silva, lead actor from El Ministerio del Tiempo

Original title	Years	Genre	Performers / hosts
+Cotas	2019	Science	Macarena Berlín
003 y medio	1979–1980	Children	Torrebruno
10 líneas de 'El Quijote'	2005	Culture	
14 de abril. La República	2011–2019	Drama series	Verónica Sánchez and Félix Gómez
La 2 en el teatro	1997	Culture	Juanjo Artero
La 2 Noticias	1994–2020	News	Lorenzo Milá, Fran Llorente, Beatriz Ariño, Cristina Villanueva, Mara Torres and Paula Sainz-Pardo
24 horas	1970–1973	News	Manuel Martín Ferrand, Jesús Hermida and José María García
24 horas en la calle	2013	Docudrama	
24 imágenes por segundo	1977	Variety show	Isabel Tenaille
3, 2, 1... contacto	1982–1983/1990–1991	Children	Sonia Martínez
30 grados a la sombra	1964	Sitcom	Antonio Garisa
300 millones	1977–1983	Variety show	Pepe Domingo Castaño
35 millones de españoles	1975	Variety show	José Antonio Plaza and Alfredo Amestoy
360 grados en torno a...	1972	Music	Valerio Lazarov
3x4	1988–1990	Game show	Julia Otero, Isabel Gemio and Jordi González
4 estrellas	2023-2024	Soap Opera	Toni Acosta
48 horas	1987–1989	News	Pedro Erquicia, Andrés Aberasturi and Antonio San José
59 segundos	2004–2012	Talk show	Mamen Mendizábal, Ana Pastor and María Casado
625 Lineas	1976–1981	Variety show	José Antonio Plaza, Mayra Gómez Kemp and Marisa Medina
7 cantos de España	1977	Science	
80 cm	2015–2023	Documentary	Edu Soto and Juan José Ballesta
9 de cada 10	2008	Game show	Toni Clapès
A debate	1991	Talk show	Josep María Balcells
A Electra le sienta bien el luto	1986	Theatre	María del Puy and Manuel Galiana
A fondo	1976–1981	Interviews	Joaquín Soler Serrano
A la caza del tesoro	1984	Game show	Miguel de la Quadra-Salcedo and Isabel Tenaille
A las diez en casa	1995	Game show	Elisenda Roca
A las diez en mi barrio	1956	Sitcom	José Luis Ozores
A las ocho con Raffaella	1993–1994	Game show	Raffaella Carrà
A las once en casa	1998–1999	Sitcom	Antonio Resines, Carmen Maura and Ana Obregón
A media tarde	1985–1988	Children	Enrique Simón
A media voz	1964	Music	María del Carmen Goñi
A media voz	1987–1989	Music	Rosa León and Óscar Ladoire
A mi manera	1989–1990	Variety show	Jesús Hermida and María Teresa Campos
A partir de hoy	2019–2020	Variety show	Máximo Huerta
A pie de página	1991–1992	Science	Salvador Valdés
A pie, en bici o en moto	1982	Science	Victoria Abril
A simple vista	1975	Culture	Leo Anchóriz
A su aire	1974	Music	
A su servicio	1993	Sitcom	Pilar Bardem
A toda plana	1965–1967	Documentary	Jesús Álvarez, Tico Medina and Miguel de la Quadra-Salcedo
A todo ritmo	1971–1972	Music	Pepe Domingo Castaño
A tope	1987–1988	Music	Eva Mosquera
A través de la tiniebla	1971	Drama series	José Luis Pellicena
A través del espejo	1988–1990	Science	Cristina García Ramos
A vista de pájaro	1986	Documentary	
Abierto por vacaciones	1993	Comedy	Cruz y Raya
Las abogadas	2024	Mini-series	Paula Usero and Irene Escolar
Abuela Cleta, La	1977	Children	
Abuela de verano	2005	Sitcom	Rosa María Sardà
El acabose	2017	Comedy	José Mota
Acacias 38	2015–	Soap opera	Sheyla Fariña
Academia de baile Gloria	2001	Sitcom	Lina Morgan
Academia TV	1962-1964	Culture	Mari Carmen García Vela
Acceso autorizado	2019	Docu-reality	Cayetana Guillén Cuervo
Acompáñame	1992	Variety show	Isabel Gemio
El Actor y sus personajes	1981	Culture	
Acuda al doctor	1960	Sitcom	Carlos Larrañaga
Adelante el inventor	1965	Game show	Enrique Rubio
Adivina quién miente esta noche	1994	Game show	Elena Markínez
Adivine su vida	1960	Game show	Federico Gallo
Aeropuerto Telefunken	1958–1959	Variety show	Mariano Ozores and Blanca Álvarez
Agenda informativa	1986–1989	News	Joaquín Arozamena
Agente 700	2001	Comedy	Josema Yuste
Agrosfera	1997-	News	Lourdes Zuriaga, María San Juan and Sandra Sutherland
Águila Roja	2009–2016	Drama series	David Janer
Ahora o nunca	1992	Game show	Ramón García
Ahora o nunca	2023-2024	Variety Show	Mònica López
Ahí te quiero ver	1984–1987	Variety show	Rosa María Sardà
Al cielo con ella	2024-	Variety Show	Henar Álvarez
Al compás de las estrellas	1971	Sports	Raúl Matas
Al filo de la Ley	2005	Drama series	Leonardo Sbaraglia
Al filo de lo imposible	1970	Drama series	Antonio Ferrandis, Agustín González, Juanjo Menéndez
Al filo de lo imposible	1982-	Documentary	Sebastián Álvaro
Al galope	1984–1986	Sports	Daniel Vindel and Marisa Abad
Al habla	1998–2004	News	Susana Hernández
Al mil por mil	1983–1986	Sports	Javier Vázquez
¡Ala... Dina!	2000–2002	Sitcom	Paz Padilla and Miriam Díaz Aroca
Alaska y Coronas	2014	Talk show	Alaska
Alaska y Segura	2015	Talk show	Alaska and Santiago Segura
Alcores	1981–1983	Science	Manuel Toharia
Alquibla	1988	Science	
Al punto	2015	Cooking show	Elena Sánchez
La Alfombra Roja Palas	2015	Variety show	Berta Collado
¿Algo que declarar?	2025	Dating Show	Pablo Chiapella
Amar en tiempos revueltos	2005–2012	Soap opera	Ana Otero
Amigas y conocidas	2014–2018	Talk show	Inés Ballester
Amigos del martes	1961–1964	Variety show	Franz Johan and Gustavo Re
Ana y los siete	2002–2005	Sitcom	Ana Obregón
Ana Tramel. El juego	2021	Drama	Maribel Verdú and Natalia Verbeke
Analía Gadé nos cuenta	1961–1962	Variety show	Analía Gadé
Andante	1977	Music	Marisa Medina
Angelino Pastor	1967	Sitcom	Juanjo Menéndez
Anillos de oro	1983	Drama series	Ana Diosdado and Imanol Arias
Animales racionales	1972–1973	Sitcom	Antonio Casal and Manolo Gómez Bur
Animalia	1970	Science	Félix Rodríguez de la Fuente
Ankawa	2005–2006	Game show	Bertín Osborne
Antena infantil	1965–1971	Children	María del Carmen Goñi
Antología de la Zarzuela	1979	Music	Fernando García de la Vega
Los Anuncios de tu vida	2011	Videos	Manuel Campo Vidal
Los Años vividos	1992	Documentary	
Apaga la luz	2007	Sitcom	Mariví Bilbao, Janfri Topera, Aurora Sánchez and Verónica Mengod
Aplauso	1978–1983	Music	José Luis Fradejas
Aquí el segundo programa	1965–1966	News	Joaquín Soler Serrano
Aquí España	1966	News	Santiago Vázquez and Marisol González
Aquí hay negocio	1995	Sitcom	María Luisa Merlo and Miguel Rellán
Aquí hay trabajo	2003-	Variety show	Juan José Pardo and María José Molina
Aquí jugamos todos	1995–1996	Game show	Miriam Díaz Aroca and Ramón García
Aquí la Tierra	2014–	Weather	Jacob Petrus
Aquí y ahora	1975–1976	Variety show	José Luis Uribarri
El árbol de los deseos	2017	Docudrama	Edu Soto
Arco de triunfo	1991	Talent show	Isabel Gemio and José Manuel Parada
Aria. Locos por la ópera	2025-2026	Talent show	Ruth Lorenzo
Arroz y tartana	2003	Drama Series	Carmen Maura and José Sancho.
El Arte de vivir	1982–1987	Science	Victoria Prego
Arte y artistas	1965–1966	Science	Manuel Sánchez Camargo
Así como suena	1982–1983	Interviews	Mari Cruz Soriano
Así de claro	2015	Talk show	Ernesto Sáenz de Buruaga
Así es la vida	1999	Interviews	Carlos Herrera
Así fue, así lo cuentan	1987	Science	Paco Costas
Así son las cosas	1997	News	Manuel Giménez
Así terminó	1960	Sitcom	Mary Carrillo
Asuntos internos	2025	Drama Series	Silvia Abascal
¡Atención obras!	2013–	Variety show	Cayetana Guillén Cuervo
Atlantia	2004	Science	Manuel Toharia
Atrévete a soñar	1998	Comedy	Julio Sabala
Auambabuluba balambambú	1985–1986	Music	Carlos Tena
Audacia	2000–2001	Game show	Jordi Estadella
Audiencia abierta	2012–	News	Ángeles Bravo
Los Aurones	1987–1988	Children	
Autores invitados	1966–1967	Science	
Autorretrato	1984–1985	Interviews	Pablo Lizcano
Aventura	1969	Documentary	Miguel de la Quadra-Salcedo
Aventura 92	1989–1991	Science	Miguel de la Quadra-Salcedo
La Aventura de la música	1963–1964	Music	Adela Cantalapiedra
La Aventura del saber	1992-	Science	María San Juan and Salvador Valdés
La Aventura humana	1985	Science	Alberto Oliveras
Las Aventuras del Hada Rebeca	1976	Children	Conchita Goyanes
Aventuras y desventuras de Mateo	1972	Sitcom	Jesús Puente
Ay Lola, Lolita, Lola	1995	Variety show	Lola Flores and Lolita Flores
Ay, vida mía	1992–1993	Variety show	Mary Carmen
Ayer domingo	1965–1971	Sports	Matías Prats Cañete and Miguel Ors
Ayer noticia, hoy dinero	1961	Game show	Mario Beut
Ayer, hoy y mañana	1968	News	Enrique Rubio
La azotea de Wyoming	2005	Late night	El Gran Wyoming
Bailando con las estrellas	2018	Talent Show	Roberto Leal
El Baile	1985	Theatre	Marisa Paredes
Bailes de salón	2006	Music	Javier Castillo, Poty
Bajo el mismo techo	1970	Sitcom	Antonio Ferrandis and Julia Gutiérrez Caba
Balas de plata	2008	Interviews	Lorena Berdún
Banana Split	2020	cooking show	Mikel López Iturriaga
La Banda de Pérez	1997	Sitcom	Antonio Resines
Barcelona: Juegos de sociedad	1992	Variety show	Inka Martí
El Barquito de papel	1963–1964	Children	Marisa Porcel
La Barraca	1979	Drama eeries	Álvaro de Luna
Barrio Sésamo	1979–2000	Children	Emma Cohen and Chelo Vivares
Bazar	1963	Variety show	Mario Cabré
Biblioteca juvenil	1966–1968	Children	María Luisa Seco
Biblioteca Nacional	1982–1983	Science	Fernando Sánchez Dragó
La bien cantá	2024-	Talent Show	Rocío Muñoz Morales
El Bigote de Babel	1987	Children	
Biografía del ayer	1964	Science	Luis Pruneda
Bit a Bit	1993–1995	Science	Luis Miguel Torrecillas and Guillem Caballé
Bla, bla, bla	1981–1983	Society news	Jesús María Amilibia and Marisa Abad
Blanco y negro	1981–1982	Variety show	Mari Cruz Soriano
El Blog de Cayetana	2007	Variety show	Cayetana Guillén Cuervo
Bloqueados por el muro	2020	Game show	Àngel Llàcer
Bodega jerezana	1957	Variety show	Jesús Álvarez
La Bola de Cristal	1984	Children	Olvido Gara
La Bolsa y la vida	1981	Science	Isabel Tenaille
El Bosque protector	2002	Science	
La Botica de la abuela	1997–2006	Variety show	Txumari Alfaro
El Botones sacarino	2000–2001	Sitcom	Jorge Roelas
Bricomanía	2000–2004	Science	Kristian Pielhoff
Brigada Central	1989–1993	Drama series	Imanol Arias
Brigada Tech	2023	Variety Show	Luján Argüelles
Buenas noches	1982–1984	Interviews	Mercedes Milá
Buenas noches, amigos	1957	Variety show	Jesús Álvarez
Buenas noches, señores	1972	Drama series	Julia Gutiérrez Caba
Las Buenas noticias	1978	News	Tico Medina
Buenas tardes	1970–1974	Variety show	Tico Medina, Raúl Matas and Santiago Vázquez
Buenas tardes con música	1963	Music	Torrebruno
Buenos días	1986–1990	News	José Antonio Martínez Soler
El Burladero	2000	Comedy	Josema Yuste
Búscate la vida	1986	Science	Montserrat Roig
Cachitos de hierro y cromo	2013–	Music	Virginia Díaz
Cada mañana	1991	Variety show	Secundino González and María San Juan
Cada semana una historia	1963	Variety show	Federico Gallo and Enrique Rubio
Café con leche	1998	Sitcom	Santiago Ramos
Caja de ritmos	1983	Music	Carlos Tena
Cajón desastre	1988–1991	Children	Miriam Díaz Aroca
Caliente	1991	Variety show	Ana Obregón
Calle nueva	1997–2000	Soap opera	Remedios Cervantes
Cámara abierta 2.0	2007	Science	Daniel Seseña
Cambie su suerte	1974	Game show	Joaquín Prat and José Luis Pécker
Cambio de Clase	2006	Science	Andrea Guasch
Camino del récord	1973–1974	Sports	Daniel Vindel
Caminos y canciones	1967	Music	Jesús Álvarez
Los Camioneros	1973–1974	Drama series	Sancho Gracia
Campanadas de Televisión Española	1962-	News	
Campeones	1963–1964	Sports	Miguel Ors
El Campo	1975–1976	News	María Luisa Clemente and Eugenio Martín Rubio
Canciones de la mar	1967	Music	Enrique Rubio and Paca Gabaldón
Canciones de una vida	1979–1989	Music	José Luis Barcelona and Aurora Claramunt
Canciones del desván	1975–1976	Music	María del Carmen Goñi
Canciones infantiles	1963	Music	Alberto Closas
Canciones para su recuerdo	1962–1963	Music	Jorge Arandes
Canción 71	1971	Music	Joaquín Prat and Laura Valenzuela
Canta! Singstar	2008	Music	Carlos Sobera
Cántame cómo pasó	2010	Music	Anne Igartiburu
Cantando se hace camino	1977	Music	Antoñita Moreno
Cantar y reir	1974–1976	Children	Los payasos de la tele
Cantares	1978	Music	Lauren Postigo
El Canto de un duro	1978–1981	Science	Mari Carmen García Vela
Cañas y barro	1978	Drama series	Manuel Tejada, José Bódalo and Victoria Vera
Capitán Q	2014	Adventure	Quico Taronjí
Caras nuevas	1957–1958	Talent show	Blanca Álvarez and Adriano Rimoldi
Carlos, rey emperador	2015–2016	Drama series	Álvaro Cervantes and Blanca Suárez
Carmen y familia	1996	Sitcom	Beatriz Carvajal
La Carretera es de todos	1967	Science	Enrique Rubio
El Carro de la farsa	1981–1983	Theatre	Rosana Torres
Carrusel	1960	Variety show	Joaquín Soler Serrano and Isabel Bauzá
Carrusel del domingo	1970	Variety show	Manuel Dicenta and José Luis Barcelona
Carta blanca	2006	Interviews	Various
Carta de ajuste	2004	Variety show	José María Íñigo and Minerva Piquero
Cartel	1965	Bullfighting	Manuel Lozano Sevilla and Matías Prats Cañete
Cartelera	1994–2009	Variety show	José Toledo
La Casa de los Martínez	1967–1971	Sitcom	Carlos Muñoz and Julia Martínez
La Casa del reloj	1971–1974	Children	Miguel Vila, Pedro Meyer and Paula Gardoqui
La Casa por la ventana	1989–1990	Comedy	Alfonso Arús
El Caso. Crónica de sucesos	2016	Drama series	Fernando Guillén Cuervo
La Caza	2019–2023	Drama series	Megan Montaner
El Cazador	2020–	Game show	Ion Aramendi
El Cazador de cerebros	2016–2024	Science	Pere Estupinyà
La Celestina	1983	Drama series	Nuria Torray
Celia	1992	Drama series	Cristina Cruz Mínguez
Cena con mamá	2019	Talk show	Cayetana Guillén Cuervo
Centro médico	2015–2019	Docudrama	
Centros de poder	1994–1995	Interviews	Pilar Cernuda and Julia Navarro
Cerca de las estrellas	1989	Sports	Ramón Trecet, José Ángel de la Casa and Jesús Álvarez
Cerca de ti	2002–2004	Talk show	Óscar Martínez
Las Cerezas	2004–2005	Interviews	Julia Otero
Cervantes	1981	Drama series	Julián Mateos
La Cesta de la compra	1986–1987	Science	Emilio Linder
Cesta y puntos	1966–1971	Game show	Daniel Vindel
Un Cesto lleno de libros	1989	Science	Enrique Simón
Las Chicas de hoy en día	1991–1992	Sitcom	Carmen Conesa and Diana Peñalver
Las Chicas de oro	2010	Sitcom	Concha Velasco, Lola Herrera, Carmen Maura and Alicia Hermida
Chicas en la ciudad	1961	Sitcom	Amparo Baró and Alicia Hermida
Los Chiripitifláuticos	1966–1976	Children	María del Carmen Goñi, Félix Casas and Miguel Armario
Cifras y letras	1991–1996	Game show	Elisenda Roca
Cine de barrio	1995-	Movies	José Manuel Parada, Carmen Sevilla and Concha Velasco
Circo pop	1988–1989	Children	Raquel Vega
Cita a las siete	1967	Interviews	Joaquín Soler Serrano
Cita con el humor	1963	Comedy	Ángel de Andrés, José Luis Coll and Manuel Summers
Cita con el humor	1971	Comedy	Cassen and Franz Johan
Cita con la música	1957–1958	Music	Blanca Álvarez
Cita con Tony Leblanc	1969–1970	Comedy	Tony Leblanc
Clan familiar	1968	Variety show	Joaquín Soler Serrano and Mario Beut
Clarín	1968	Variety show	Charo Tijero
Clase media	1987	Drama series	Charo López and Antonio Ferrandis
Claves del siglo XXI, Las	2022	Economy	Javier Ruiz.
Clásicos y reverentes	2017–2018	Music	
La Clave	1976–1983	Talk show	José Luis Balbín
Climas extremos	2012	Documentary	Mario Picazo
Clip, clap, video	1991–1995	Music	Tinet Rubira and Guillem Caballé
Club de fútbol	2007–2008	Sports	Josep Pedrerol
El Club de la comedia	2003–2004	Comedy	Emilio Aragón
Club del martes	1960–1961	Variety show	José Luis Barcelona
Club del sábado	1958–1959	Variety show	Jesús Álvarez
Club Disney	1990–1996	Children	Juan José Pardo and Luis Miguel Torrecilla
Club mediodía	1967–1972	Variety show	Mario Beut, Marisol González and Bobby Deglané
Club Miramar	1959–1960	Variety show	Federico Gallo and Mario Cabré
Cocina	1957–1958	Cooking show	Rosita Valero and Adriano Rimoldi
Cocina al punto con Peña y Tamara	2020	Cooking show	Tamara Falcó
Cocineros al volante	2015	Cooking show	Paula Prendes
Cocina con Sergio	2012–2015	Cooking show	Sergio Fernández and María José Molina
La Cocina de Arguiñano	1995–1998	Cooking show	Karlos Arguiñano
Cocina2	2014–2015	Cooking show	Torres Brothers
Código Emprende	2013	Reality show	Juan Ramón Lucas
Código uno	1993–1994	News	Arturo Pérez-Reverte and Julio César Iglesias
El Coleccionismo y los coleccionistas	1979	Science	Carmen Maura
Comando actualidad	2008-2025	News	
La Comedia	1983–1984	Theatre	
La Comedia dramática española	1986	Theatre	
La Comedia musical española	1985	Music	Fernando García de la Vega
La Cometa blanca	1981–1983	Children	Rosa León and Jaime Blanch
La Cometa naranja	1974	Children	Pedro Meyer and Luis Varela
Cómicos	1987	Culture	
Como el perro y el gato	2007	Sitcom	Arturo Fernández and Quique Camoiras
¿Cómo lo hacen?	1994	Game show	Jordi Hurtado and Almudena Ariza
Como lo ves	1983–1984	Children	Enrique Miret and Pilar Pala
Como lo ves	2017	Talk show	Carlos Herrera
Cómo nos reimos	2012-	Comedy	
Como Pedro por su casa	1985	Variety show	Pedro Ruiz
Como sapiens	2020-2021	Cooking show	Miguel Ángel Muñoz
Comodín de La 1, El	2022-2023	Quiz Show	Aitor Albizu
Compañera te doy	1973	Sitcom	Carlos Larrañaga and María Luisa Merlo
Con acento	1968	Science	Manuel Martín Ferrand
Con dos tacones	2006	Sitcom	Lorena Berdún and Rosario Pardo
Con las manos en la masa	1984–1991	Cooking show	Elena Santonja
Con otro acento	1976–1977	Science	Miguel de los Santos
Con todos los acentos	2005–2009	News	Sanaá Harraki
Con un par... de bromas	2008	Comedy	Javier Capitán
Con vosotros	1970–1972	Children	María Luisa Seco
Concertino	1963–1964	Music	Torrebruno
El conciertazo	2000–2009	Music	Fernando Argenta
El Conde de Monte Cristo	1969	Drama series	Pepe Martín
El condensador de fluzo	2021-2025	Science	Juan Gómez-Jurado and Raquel Martos.
La conexión	2025	Game Show	Lara Álvarez
Confidencias	1963–1965	Drama series	Antonio Ferrandis
Conocemos España	1978	Game show	Mario Beut
¿Conoces España?	2012	Game show	Ramón García
Conozca usted España	1968–1969	Science	Natalia Figueroa
Conquistador, El	2023	Reality Show	Raquel Sánchez-Silva and Julian Iantzi
Consulte a su médico	1968	Science	Blanca Álvarez and Elisa Montés
Consultorio	1961	Comedy	Álvaro de Laiglesia and Luis Sánchez Polack
Consumo	1981–1987	Science	Rafael Romero
Contamos contigo	1968	Variety show	Laura Valenzuela
Contigo pan y cebolla	1996–1997	Sitcom	Anabel Alonso and Ángel de Andrés López
Contigo	1988	Variety show	Norma Duval
El Continental	2018	Drama series	Michelle Jenner and Alex Garcia
Contra-reloj	1972	Sports	Julio César Fernández
La Copa	1963	Sports	Matías Prats Cañete
Corazón	1997-	Society news	Anne Igartiburu
Corazón	1989–1990	Interviews	Fernando García Tola
Corazón, Corazón	1993–2010	Society news	Cristina García Ramos, Jose Toledo and Carolina Casado
El coro de la cárcel	2006–2008	Talent show	Muntsa Rius
La Corona mágica	1989–1990	Children	
Las Cortes de España	1983–1985	News	Rosa María Artal and Florencio Solchaga
Cosas de dos	1984	Sitcom	Nicolás Dueñas and Covadonga Cadenas
Cosas	1980–1981	Variety show	Joaquín Prat, Marisa Abad and Mónica Randall
Las cosas claras	2020–2021	Talk show	Jesús Cintora
Costa España	2015	Documentary	Mario Picazo
Cotilleo al aire libre	1957–1958	Society news	Jesús Álvarez and Blanca Álvarez
Cover Night	2023	Talent Show	Ruth Lorenzo
Cremallera	1984–1985	Children	Juanjo Guerenabarrena
Cristina y los hombres	1969	Sitcom	Elena María Tejeiro
Cristóbal Colón	1968	Drama series	Francisco Rabal
Crónica joven	1988	Children	Francisco García Novell
Crónicas	2004–2006	News	Elena Sánchez
Crónicas de un pueblo	1971–1974	Sitcom	Emilio Rodríguez, Fernando Cebrián, Francisco Vidal, Jesús Guzmán
Crónicas del mal	1992	Drama series	Antonio Resines
Crónicas urbanas	1990	Drama series	Nuria González
Crush	2018	Quiz Show	Juan Manuel López Iturriaga
Cruz y raya.com	2000–2004	Comedy	Cruz y Raya
Cuaderno de campo	2022-2023	Documentary	Juan Antonio Rodríguez Llano
¿Cuál es tu final?	1966–1967	Sitcom	Jaime Blanch
Cuánto, cuánto, cuánto	2025	Game Show	Eva Soriano
Cuarta dimensión	1960–1961	Science	Tico Medina
Cuarto de estar	1963	Sitcom	Valeriano Andrés and Margot Cottens
Cuarto y mitad	1976	Science	Isabel Bauzá
Cuatro tiempos	1974–1975	Sports	Paco Costas
Cuéntame cómo pasó	2001-2023	Drama series	Imanol Arias and Ana Duato
Cuentopos	1974–1976	Children	Tina Sáinz, Juan Diego and Manuel Galiana
Cuentos imposibles	1984	Drama series	Francisco Rabal and Amparo Baró
Cuentos y leyendas	1968–1976	Drama series	
Cuestión de tiempo	2016	Talk Show	Patricia Gaztañaga
La Cueva de los cerrojos	1984	Drama series	
Cultura 2	1975	Culture	Elena Escobar and Paloma Chamorro
Culturas 2	2022-	Culture	Paula Sainz-Pardo.
Cultural informativo	1975	Science	Clara Isabel Francia
Cumbres	2014	Sport	Edurne Pasabán
Curro Jiménez	1976–1978	Drama series	Sancho Gracia
D-Calle	2006–2007	Variety show	Cayetana Guillén Cuervo
The Dancer	2021	Talent show	Ion Aramendi
Danzas de España	1966	Music	Jesús Álvarez
La Dársena de poniente	2006	Drama series	Sancho Gracia
David el gnomo	1985	Children	
De 500 a 500.000	1962–1963	Game show	José Luis Pécker
De ahora en adelante	1981–1982	Music	Miguel de los Santos
De carne y hueso	1991	Interviews	Vicky Larraz
De cerca	1980–1981	Interviews	Jesús Hermida
De cerca	2004–2007	Interviews	Baltasar Magro
De jueves a jueves	1986	Interviews	Mercedes Milá
De la A a la Z	1972	Science	Manuel Criado de Val and Clara Isabel Francia
De la mano de	1985	Variety show	
De par en par	1991–1992	Variety show	Javier Vázquez
¿De parte de quién?	1993–1994	Comedy	Miguel Gila and Chus Lampreave
De película	1982–1991	Movies	Isabel Mestres and Emilio Linder
¿De qué parte estás?	1994–1995	Talk show	José María Íñigo
De siete en siete	1985–1987	Variety show	Cristina Higueras and Nina Ferrer
De tal palo	1992	Game show	Ramoncín
De tapas por España	2024	Documentary	Adrienne Chaballe
De toros	1989	Bullfighting	José María Íñigo
El Debate de La Primera	2012–2017	Talk show	María Casado and Pilar G. Muñiz
El Debate de TVE 2	2002–2004	Talk show	Josep Puigbó, Luis Herrero and Alfredo Urdaci
Debate	1987	Talk Show	Victoria Prego
Decogarden	2000–2004	Variety show	Yolanda Alzola
Del dicho al hecho	1971	Sitcom	Fernando Fernán Gómez
Del hilo al ovillo	1965	News	Federico Gallo and Enrique Rubio
Del Miño al Bidasoa	1990	Science	Nicolás Dueñas
Delirios de amor	1989	Drama series	Marisa Paredes
Dentro de un orden	1983–1986	Science	Cristina García Ramos
Deporte para todos	1981	Sports	Narciso Ibáñez Serrador
Derecho a discrepar	1988	Talk show	Miguel Ángel Gozalo
Derecho a soñar	2019	Drama Series	Alba Ribas
Desafía tu mente	2016–2018	Science	Antonio Lobato
Desafío 2016	2016	Game Show	Almudena Cid
Desaparecida	2007–2008	Drama series	Carlos Hipólito and Luisa Martín
Desaparecidos	2018	Public Service	Silvia Intxaurrondo
Los Desastres de la guerra	1983	Drama series	Sancho Gracia
Los desayunos de TVE	1994–2020	Interviews	Julio César Iglesias, Luis Mariñas and Pepa Bueno
Desde mi butaca	1956–1957	Variety show	Jesús Álvarez
Desde mi butaca	1970	Variety show	Álvaro de la Iglesia
Destino Argentina	1978	Game show	Joaquín Prat
El Destino en sus manos	1995	Variety show	Gemma Nierga
Destino de Mujer (co-production with Venevisión)	1998 - 1999	Telenovela, drama series	Sonya Smith & Jorge Reyes
Destino Plutón	1980	Children	Maria Jesús Lleonard and Blanca Martorell
Destino TV	1964	Variety show	Antolín García
Destinos de película	2016	Movies	Máximo Huerta
Detrás de la noticia	1990–1991	News	José Antonio Martínez Soler
Detrás del telón	1968	Theatre	Fernando Guillén and Gemma Cuervo
Devórame otra vez	1991	Variety show	Guillermo Summers and Susana Hernández
Día a día	1963	Sitcom	Amparo Baró and Mari Carmen Prendes
Día de fiesta	1966–1969	Variety show	Juan Viñas and Herta Frankel
Un Día es un día	1990–1993	Interviews	Àngel Casas
El Día por delante	1989–1990	Variety show	Pepe Navarro
El Día por delante	2008	Variety show	Inés Ballester
El Día que me quieras	1995	Variety show	José María Íñigo
Días de tele	2023	Talk Show	Julia Otero
Diálogos de un matrimonio	1982	Sitcom	Jesús Puente and María Luisa San José
Diana en negro	1970	Drama series	José Bódalo
Diario de sesiones	1985–1986	News	María Teresa Campos
Diario de un ciclista	2021	Documentary	Peio Ruiz Cabestany
Diario de un nómada	2015	Documentary	Miquel Silvestre
Diarios de la cuarentena	2020	Sitcom	Petra Martínez
Días de cine	1991-	Movies	Antonio Gasset and Cayetana Guillén Cuervo
Días de verano	2021	Variety show	Inés Paz
Días de vino	2000–2001	Science	
Diccionario de la salud	1988–1989	Science	Ramón Sánchez Ocaña
Dicho y hecho	2018	Comedy	José Corbacho and Anabel Alonso
Dichoso mundo	1966–1967	Sitcom	Conchita Montes
Diego Acevedo	1966	Drama series	Paco Valladares
Diego Valor	1958	Drama series	Ignacio de Paúl
Las Diez de últimas	1969–1970	Game show	José Luis Pecker
Diez en Ibiza	2004	Drama series	Ángel de Andrés López and Emma Ozores
Digan lo que digan	1997–1999	Talk show	Jaime Bores
Dime qué fue de ti	2016	Variety Show	Teresa Viejo
Dinamo	1985–1986	Children	Marta Barroso
Ding-Dong	1980	Game show	Andrés Pajares and Mayra Gómez Kemp
Directísimo	1975–1976	Variety show	José María Íñigo
Directo al grano	2025 - ¿?	Talk show	Marta Flich and Gonzalo Miró
Directo en la noche	1986	Variety show	Jair Pont
Discorama	1964–1965	Music	Pepe Palau and José Luis Barcelona
Discoteca joven	1968	Music	María Luisa Seco
Divertido siglo	1972–1973	Sitcom	Alfonso del Real
Las Doce caras de Eva	1971–1972	Sitcom	Juan Diego
Las Doce caras de Juan	1967	Sitcom	Alberto Closas
Doce cuentos y una pesadilla	1967	Drama series	
Las Doce en punta	1989	Variety show	Joaquín Arozamena
Doce lecciones de felicidad conyugal	1969	Sitcom	Pedro Osinaga and María José Alfonso
Doctor Romero	2017	Science	Nicolás Romero
Documentos TV	1986-	Documentary	Pedro Erquicia
Dog House	2025	Science	Chenoa
Dogtanian and the Three Muskehounds	1982–1983	Children	
El Domin... gol	1997	Sports	Pedro Ruiz
Un Domingo cualquiera	2003–2004	Variety show	Ramón García
El Domingo es nuestro	1986–1987	Variety show	Natalia Millán
Domingueros	1989	Sports	Joaquín Arozamena
Don Baldomero y su gente	1982	Sitcom	Luis Escobar
Don José, Pepe y Pepito	1965	Sitcom	José Bódalo
Don Quijote de la Mancha	1980	Children	Fernando Fernán Gómez
Donde comen dos	2019	Cooking show	El Langui
Dos cadenas para ti	1990	Variety show	Guillermo Summers and Susana Hernández
Dos en la ciudad	1965	Sitcom	
Dos en uno	1959	Variety show	Miguel de los Santos
Dos parejas y un destino	2021	Travel	
Dos por dos	1978	Interviews	Mercedes Milá and Isabel Tenaille
Dos rombos	2004–2005	Science	Lorena Berdún
Dos vidas	2021-2022	Soap Opera	Laura Ledesma
Dossier	1978	Documentary	Javier Basilio, Jesús González Green and Luis Pancorbo
Dra. Fabiola Jones	2025-2026	Science	Fabiola Quesada
Dúos increíbles	2022-2023	Talent Show	Juan y Medio.
La edad de oro	1983–1985	Music	Paloma Chamorro
El Edén	1987	Music	Miguel Ángel Jenner
Edición especial	1963–1969	News	Federico Gallo and Enrique Rubio
Efecto ciudadano	2013–2014	Public service	Arnau Benlloch
El que dice ser y llamarse	1965–1966	Comedy	Tony Leblanc
Los Electroduendes	1986–1988	Children	Miguel Ángel Jenner
Ellas	2017	Documentary	Blanca Portillo
Empléate a fondo	1996–2000	Variety show	Yolanda Vázquez
Emprendedores	2005–2008	Variety show	
En antena	1963–1965	Variety show	Pedro Macía, Marisa Medina and Isabel Bauzá
En broma	1961	Comedy	Cassen
En buena hora	1990–1991	Variety show	Joaquín Arozamena
En equipo	1970–1971	Variety show	José Luis Uribarri and Alfredo Amestoy
En este país	1981–1982	News	Ladislao Azcona
En familia	1987–1988	Talk show	Iñaki Gabilondo
En la cuerda floja	1985	Variety show	El Gran Wyoming
En La 2	2010–	News	Mara Torres
En la naturaleza	1987	Science	Sonia Martínez
En la tuya o en la mía	2015–2016	Talk show	Bertín Osborne
En lengua de signos	2008-	News	Paloma Soroa
En marcha	1985–1986	Sports	Eva Nasarre
En noches como ésta	2008–2010	Interviews	Juan Ramón Lucas
En órbita	1967	Comedy	Tony Leblanc
En otras palabras	1997–2008	News	María José Aristizábal
En paralelo	1982–1984	Variety show	Ignacio Salas and Elena Markínez
En portada	2001-	Documentary	
En primicia	2024	Talk Show	Lara Siscar
En verde	2003–2004	Science	Santiago López Castillo and Adela Cantalapiedra
Ena. Queen Victoria Eugenia	2025	Mini-Series	Kimberley Tell
Encuentros	2022-2023	Talk Show	Elena Sánchez and Jesús Marchamalo
Encuentros con las letras	1976–1981	Science	Elena Escobar and Roberto Llamas
Encuentros en libertad	1982–1984	Science	Sibely Valle
Los Encuentros	1966–1967	Science	
Las Enfermeras	1963	Drama series	Nuria Torray and María Massip
Enfoque	2004–2007	News	Pedro Piqueras and Elena Sánchez
Enigma	1963–1964	Drama series	Arturo López
Enred@d@s	2022	Variety show	María Gómez and Sara Escudero.
Entre amigos	1985–1989	Variety show	José Luis Moreno
Entre líneas	1988–1990	Science	Carmen Posadas
Entre Morancos y Omaitas	1997–1998	Comedy	Los Morancos
Entre naranjos	1998	Drama series	Toni Cantó and Nina
Entre nosotras	1957–1958	Variety show	Elena Santonja and Chus Lampreave
Entre todos	2013–2014	Variety show	Toñi Moreno
Entre tú y yo	1997	Variety show	Laura Valenzuela
Entrevista a la carta	2012	Interviews	Julia Otero
Los Episodios	1979	Children	Francisco Merino
Equipo de vuelo	1964	Drama series	Alfredo Mayo
Érase una vez la tele	1996	Videos	Guillermo Summers and Susana Hernández
¿Es usted el asesino?	1968	Drama series	Narciso Ibáñez Menta
Escala en hi-fi	1961–1967	Music	Fernando García de la Vega
Escala internacional	1978	Variety show	
Escalera interior, escalera exterior	1986	Sitcom	Agustín González
La Escalera mecánica	2000	Variety show	Jordi González
El Escarabajo verde	1997	Science	Pere Ortín
Escrito en América	1979	Drama series	
Escritores en televisión	1968–1969	Drama series	Alfredo Mayo
Escuela de maridos	1963–1965	Sitcom	Elvira Quintillá
Escuela de matrimonios	1967	Sitcom	Elvira Quintillá
Escuela de salud	1975	Science	Manuel Torreiglesias
Escuela del deporte	1999–2005	Sports	Carlos Beltrán, Estela Giménez and Sandra Daviú
Escuela TV	1961-1963	Culture	Pilar Cañada, Marisa Medina and Clara Isabel Francia
Ese programa del que usted me habla	2018–2019	Comedy	Marta Flich
Espacio XX	1981	Science	Carmen Tomás
España a ras de cielo	2013	Documentary	Francis Lorenzo
La España de los Botejara	1978	Docudrama	Alfredo Amestoy
España Directo	2005–2022	News	Pilar García Muñiz
España en comunidad	2000-	News	Patricia Betancort
España en directo	1971–1972	News	Tico Medina
España.es	2005	Science	Mon Santiso
España Innova	2005–2006	Science	Sandra Sutherland, Mónica Aragón and Tania Herreras
La España salvaje	1996	Science	Felipe de Borbón
El español y los siete pecados capitales	1980	Sitcom	Jesús Puente and Juanjo Menéndez
Españoles en conflictos	2023	Documentary	Almudena Ariza
Españoles en el mundo	2005	Documentary	Miguel Ángel Tobías
Españoles en el mundo	2009–2015	Documentary	
Españoles en el Pacífico	1980	Documentary	Miguel de la Quadra-Salcedo
Españoles	1983	Interviews	Victoria Prego
Especial pop	1969–1970	Music	Miguel de los Santos, Elsa Baeza and Manuel Galiana
El Espectador y el lenguaje	1969–1970	Science	Manuel Criado de Val
Los Espectáculos	1978–1979	Variety show	Clara Isabel Francia, Isabel Bauzá and José María Comesaña
El Espejo mágico	1985–1986	Variety show	Isabel Bauzá
Espejo secreto	1997–1998	Comedy	Norma Duval
Espinete no existe	2016–2017	Variety show	Eduardo Aldán
Esta es mi historia	2001–2004	Talk show	Ana García Lozano
Esta es mi tierra	1983	Documentary	
Esta es su casa	1990–1991	Variety show	María Teresa Campos
Ésta es su vida	1962–1968/1993	Variety show	Federico Gallo and Ricardo Fernández Deu
Esta mañana	2008–2009	Variety show	Pepa Bueno and Inmaculada Galván
Esta noche	1981–1982	Interviews	Carmen Maura
Esta noche con...	1969–1970	Music	Conchita Bautista
Esta noche... fiesta	1976	Variety show	José María Íñigo
Esta noche Pedro	1986	Comedy	Pedro Ruiz
Esta semana	1982–1983	Variety show	Cristina García Ramos and Florencio Solchaga
La Estación de Perpignán	1987	Culture	Paloma Chamorro
Estadio 1	2015–2016	Sports	Juan Carlos Rivero
Estadio 2	1984–2007	Sports	Olga Viza
Estamos de vuelta	1995–1997	Comedy	Cruz y Raya
Estamos en directo	1999	Comedy	Cruz y Raya
Este no es el programa de los viernes	1998	Comedy	Cruz y Raya
Este planeta	1970	Science	Jaime de Foxá
Este señor de negro	1975–1976	Sitcom	José Luis López Vázquez
Estilo	1962	Variety show	Marisol González
Esto es espectáculo	1994–1996	Variety show	Bárbara Rey
Esto es lo que hay	1985	Variety show	El Gran Wyoming
Esto es lo que hay	1995–1996	Interviews	Àngel Casas
Esto es vida	2004–2005	Variety show	Juan Ramón Lucas
Esto es vida	2015–2016	Health	Cristina Lasvignes
Esto no es lo que parece	1994–1995	Talk show	Jordi Estadella
Estoy vivo	2017–2021	Serie dramática	Javier Gutiérrez
Estravagario	2004–2007	Science	Javier Rioyo
Estrellas en 625 líneas	1963	Variety show	Joaquín Soler Serrano
Estress	1991	Variety show	Bibiana Fernández, Rossy de Palma and Loles León
Estudio 1	1965–1985	Theatre	
Estudio 3	1963–1965	Theatre	
Estudio abierto	1970–1985	Interviews	José María Íñigo
Estudio Estadio	1972–2005	Sports	Matías Prats Luque, Pedro Ruiz and Juan Carlos Rivero
Estudio galerías	1960	Variety show	Daniel Vindel
Etcétera	1977	Culture	Jana Escribano, Eva Gloria and Lola Martínez
Eurocanción	2000–2001	Music	Carlos Lozano
Eurofestival	1964–1965	Music	José Luis Barcelona
Eurojunior	2003	Music	Carlos Lozano
Europa, Europa	1987	Science	Pedro Erquicia
Eva a las diez	1977	Music	Fernando García de la Vega
Eva frente al espejo	1970	Drama series	Mary Carrillo
Eva y Adán, agencia matrimonial	1990	Sitcom	Verónica Forqué and Antonio Resines
Evocación	1982–1983	Videos	Blanca Aguete
Los Excluidos	2000	Documentary	Carmen Sarmiento
Exterior día	1981	Variety show	Olga Viza
Extra	2006	Comedy	Tonino and Aina Cerdá
Fábrica de ideas	2008	Variety show	Sandra Barneda
Fabricando: Made in Spain	2013–2015	Variety show	Liborio García
Fábulas	1968–1970	Sitcom	Jaime de Armiñán
Fago	2008	Drama series	Jordi Rebellón
La Familia Colón	1967	Drama series	Nuria Carresi
La familia de la tele	2025	Variety show	María Patiño and Inés Hernand
La Familia por dentro	1960	Science	Adriano del Valle
Famosos y familia	1999	Sitcom	Carmen Maura
Fantastic Dúo	2017	Music	Nuria Roca
Fantástico	1978–1981	Variety show	José María Íñigo
Fauna	1968–1970	Science	Félix Rodríguez de la Fuente
Los Felices 80	1990	Sitcom	Xabier Elorriaga
Fernández, punto y coma	1963–1964	Sitcom	Adolfo Marsillach and María Massip
Festival Marconi	1957–1958	Variety show	Pedro Terol and Victoriano Fernández de Asís
Festival	1970–1974	Variety show	José Antonio Rosa
Festival de la Canción Infantil de TVE	1967–1973	Music	
Fetiche	1996	Sitcom	Lola Baldrich
Ficciones	1971–1981	Theatre	Sergi Schaaff
Fiesta brava	1959–1964	Bullfighting	Manuel Lozano Sevilla
Fiesta	1974–1975	Children	Luis Barbero and Judy Stephen
Fiesta con nosotros	1962	Children	Juan Viñas and Herta Frankel
Fiesta suprema	2013–2014	Variety show	Loulogio, Bolli, Outconsumer
Fila 7	1983–1984	Movies	Rosa María Mateo
Fila cero	1958–1962	Theatre	
Fin de semana	1963–1970	Variety show	José Luis Uribarri, Marisa Medina and Federico Gallo
Fin de siglo	1985–1987	Interviews	Pablo Lizcano
Firmado Pérez	1963	Sitcom	Agustín González
El Flechazo	1997–1998	Game show	Anabel Alonso and Asunción Embuena
FM 2	1988–1989	Music	Christina Rosenvinge
Follow Through	1986–1987	Science	Juan Antonio Ollero and Izaskun Azurmendi
La forja de un rebelde	1990	Drama series	Antonio Valero
Foro TV	1963–1965	Interviews	Victoriano Fernández de Asís
Fortunata y Jacinta	1980	Drama series	Ana Belén and Maribel Martín
El final del camino	2017	Drama Series	Antonio Velázquez
Fragmentos de interior	1984	Drama series	Emma Suárez
Fronteras al límite	2015	Documentary	
Las Fronteras de la ciencia	1966	Science	Luis Miravitlles
Fuera de clase	2014	Children	David Bustamante
Fuera de control	2006	Sitcom	Loles León
Fuera de lugar	2008	Sitcom	Natalia Dicenta
Fuerza de paz	2022-2023	Drama Series	Silvia Alonso and Martiño Rivas.
Fugitiva	2018	Drama Series	Paz Vega
Función de noche	1996–1997	Theatre	
Futuro imperfecto	2025- ¿?	Comedy	Andreu Buenafuente
Gaceta cultural	1979–1981	Culture	Julio César Fernández and Jana Escribano
Gafapastas	2011	Game show	Juanra Bonet
Galas del sábado	1969–1970	Music	Joaquín Prat and Laura Valenzuela
Galería	1973–1974	Culture	Paloma Chamorro
Galería de esposas	1960	Sitcom	Margot Cottens
Galería de maridos	1959	Sitcom	Adolfo Marsillach and Amparo Baró
Gama	1966–1970	Variety show	
Gane su viaje	1961–1962	Game show	Jorge Arandes
La garita	2025	Comedy	J.J. Vaquero
Gatos en el tejado	1988	Drama series	José Sacristán and Emma Cohen
Géminis, venganza de amor	2002–2003	Soap opera	Ana Turpin and Isabel Serrano
Generación 800	1985	Science	Isabel Borondo
Generación Rock	2013	Talent show	Melendi
Generación web	2015	Science	
Gente	1995–2011	Variety show	Pepa Bueno and Sonia Ferrer
+Gente	2011–2013	Variety show	Pilar García Muñiz and Anne Igartiburu
Gente de primera	1993	News	Iñaki Gabilondo
Gente de Primera	2005	Game show	Esther Arroyo and Jorge Fernández
Gente del sábado	1977	Variety show	Tico Medina
Gente hoy	1976–1981	Variety show	Isabel Tenaille, Mari Cruz Soriano and Javier Vázquez
Gente joven	1974–1987	Talent show	Jesús Villarino, Marisa Abad and Mercedes Rodríguez
La Gente quiere saber	1973	Interviews	José María Íñigo
Gigantes de La 2	2018	Interviews	Mari Cruz Soriano
Gira	2014	Docudrama	
El Gladiador	2002	Game show	Ramón García
Un Globo, dos globos, tres globos	1974–1979	Children	María Luisa Seco
Gol... y al mundial 82	1981–1982	Game show	Miguel Vila
La Goleta	1958	Comedy	Tony Leblanc and José Luis Ozores
Las Gomas	1956	Comedy	Tony Leblanc
El Gong show	2007	Game show	Paz Padilla
Goya	1985	Drama series	Enric Majó
Los Gozos y las sombras	1982	Drama series	Eusebio Poncela, Amparo Rivelles and Charo López
Gracias por todo	1997	Reality show	Ana Obregón
Graderío	1963–1964	Sports	Manuel Lozano Sevilla, Matías Prats and Miguel Ors
El Gran circo de TVE	1973–1991	Children	Los payasos de la tele
Gran circo	1961	Children	Fernando García de la Vega
Gran confusión, La	2022-	Talk Show	Javier Sardà
La Gran ocasión	1972–1974	Game show	Miguel de los Santos
Gran parada	1959–1964	Variety show	Ana María Solsona, Carmina Alonso and Isabel Bauzá
Gran premio	1966–1967	Game show	Federico Gallo, Antolín García and Miguel Ors
El gran premio de la cocina	2024	Cooking Show	Lydia Bosch
Gran Reserva	2010–2013	Drama series	Emilio Gutiérrez Caba and Ángela Molina
Gran Reserva. El origen	2013	Drama series	Víctor Clavijo and Verónica Sánchez
El Gran reto musical	2017	Talent Show	Eva González
Gran Splash	2000	Game show	David Meca
Gran teatro	1960–1964	Theatre	
Grand Prix	1995–2005: 2023-	Game show	Ramón García
La Guagua	1975–1977	Children	Torrebruno and Paula Gardoqui
Guante blanco	2008	Drama series	Carlos Hipólito
La Guerra de los mandos	2008	Videos	Inma del Moral
Habitación 503	1993–1994	Sitcom	Francisco Cecilio and María Luisa San José
Habitación 508	1966	Sitcom	Adolfo Marsillach
Hablando claro	1987–1992	Game show	Salvador Valdés, Inka Martí and Ana García Siñeriz
Hablando claro	2022-2023	Variety Show	Lourdes Maldonado.
Hablamos	1977–1982	News	Marisol González
Hablemos de sexo	1990	Science	Elena Ochoa
Hacer de comer	2019–2020	Cooking show	Dani García
Hacia la fama	1958–1959	Talent show	Blanca Álvarez
Hasta el fin del mundo	2025 - ¿?	Game show	Paula Vázquez
Hasta luego cocodrilo	1991	Sitcom	Amparo Baró
Hasta que la tele nos separe	2006	Comedy	Paz Padilla
Hay que vivir	2007	Reality show	Almudena Ariza and Mariola Ruiz
Las Hazañas de Marianín y Teresita	1957	Children	Alberto Muñiz and María José Valero
Herederos	2007–2009	Drama series	Concha Velasco
Hermenegildo Pérez, para servirle	1966	Sitcom	Carlos Larrañaga
Héroes invisibles	2016–2017	Documentary	
Una Hija más	1991	Sitcom	Miguel Rellán and Mercedes Sampietro
Hijos de Babel	2008	Game show	Antonio Garrido
Los Hijos del frío	1991	Science	Ramón Sánchez Ocaña
Hilo directo	1968–1969	News	Federico Gallo
Hispanovisión	1970	Variety show	José Luis Uribarri
Historia de nuestro cine	2015–	Movies	Elena S. Sánchez
La Historia de San Michele	1964	Drama series	Narciso Ibáñez Serrador and Narciso Ibáñez Menta
Historias de Alcafrán	2020	Sitcom	Álex Gadea
Historias de hoy	1967	Drama series	
Historias de Juan Español	1972–1973	Sitcom	Juanjo Menéndez
Historias del otro lado	1991	Drama series	José Luis Garci
Historias de mi barrio	1964	Sitcom	Félix Navarro and Luchy Soto
Historias naturales	1967–1968	Sitcom	
Historias para no dormir	1965–1970/1982	Drama series	Narciso Ibáñez Serrador
HIT	2020-	Drama series	Daniel Grao
Hit - La canción	2015	Talent show	Jaime Cantizano
Hogar, dulce hogar	1959–1960	Sitcom	Ángel de Andrés
Hola chicos	1984–1987	Children	María Luisa Seco
Hola, ola	1996	Music	Miguel Ortiz and María Adánez
¡Hola Raffaella!	1992–1994	Game show	Raffaella Carrà
El hombre de tu vida	2016	Drama Series	José Mota
El Hombre y la Tierra	1974–1980	Documentary	Félix Rodríguez de la Fuente
El Hombre, ese desconocido	1963–1964	Science	José María Prada
Hombres que dejan huella	1966	Science	Federico Gallo
Los hombres saben, los pueblos marchan	1969–1970	Game show	Joaquín Soler Serrano
Hora 15	1977–1979	Culture	Manuel Martín Ferrand and Jana Escribano
La Hora de...	1975–1976	Music	Fernando García de la Vega
La Hora de José Mota	2009–2012	Comedy	José Mota
La Hora de La 1	2020–	Variety	Mònica López
La Hora del lector	1987–1988	Science	Luis Carandell
La Hora del TPT	1988–1989	Game show	José Luis Coll, Andrés Caparrós and Ignacio Salas
La Hora Musa	2018–2021	Music	Maika Makovski
Hora once	1969–1974	Theatre	
La Hora Philips	1957	Variety show	Jesús Álvarez and María José Valero
Hora punta	1969	Science	Victoriano Fernández de Asís
Hora punta	2016–2018	Variety Show	Javier Cárdenas
Horas doradas	1980	Music	
Horizontes	1977–1981	Science	Ramón Sánchez Ocaña and Marisa Naranjo
Hospital Valle Norte	2019	Drama Series	Alexandra Jiménez
Hostal Royal Manzanares	1996–1998	Sitcom	Lina Morgan
El Hotel de las mil y una estrellas	1978–1979	Comedy	Luis Aguilé
Hotel romántico	2017	Dating show	Roberto Leal
Hoy 14, 15	1974–1975	Variety show	José María Íñigo
Hoy de 6 a 7	1990	Variety show	Concha Galán and Goyo González
Hoy dirige	1961	Sitcom	Gustavo Pérez Puig
Hoy es fiesta	1959	Variety show	María Mahor
Hoy es posible	1997	Reality show	Nieves Herrero
Hoy llegó la primavera	1963	Sitcom	Carlos Larrañaga and María Luisa Merlo
Hoy no, mañana	2019	Comedy	José Mota
Hoy por hoy	1976	Variety show	Tico Medina and Jana Escribano
Hoy también es fiesta	1970–1975	Children	Torrebruno, Kiko Ledgard and Luis Barbero
La Huella del crimen	1985	Drama series	
La Huella del hombre	1969–1970	Science	Rafael de Penagos
Humanos y divinos	2010	Interviews	Boris Izaguirre
El Humor de tu vida	2004	Comedy	Las Veneno and Bermúdez
Identity	2007–2008	Game show	Antonio Garrido
iFamily	2017	Sitcom	Antonio Resines and Raúl Fernández de Pablo
Los Iglesias. Hermanos a la obra	2024	Variety	Chabeli Iglesias and Julio Iglesias Jr.
La Imagen de tu vida	2006	Videos	Jesús Hermida
Imagen de una vida	1956–1957	Science	Victoriano Fernández de Asís
Imágenes	1978–1981	Culture	Paloma Chamorro
Imágenes para saber	1966–1967	Science	Manuel Martín Ferrand
Imágenes prohibidas	1994	Science	
El Imperdible	1997–1998	Variety show	Anne Igartiburu
Imprescindibles	2010–	Documentary	
In fraganti	2000–2001	Comedy	Paz Padilla
Informativo juvenil	1980–1982	Children	Francisco García Novell
El Informe del día	1992	News	José Antonio Martínez Soler and Inka Martí
Informe Semanal	1973-	News	Rosa María Mateo, Mari Carmen García Vela and Baltasar Magro
Insuperables	2015	Talent show	Carolina Cerezuela
Las Instituciones	1974–1975	Science	Alberto Delgado
Investigación en marcha	1970	News	Enrique Rubio and Pedro Macía
Invictus, ¿Te atreves?	2024	Game Show	Patricia Conde
Isabel	2012	Drama series	Michelle Jenner
Jacinto Durante, representante	2000	Sitcom	Javier Manrique
Jardilín	1966–1968	Children	Charo Tijero
El jardín de Venus	1983–1984	Drama series	Fernando Fernán Gómez and Verónica Forqué
Jazz entre amigos	1984–1991	Music	Juan Claudio Cifuentes
Jimanji kanana	2003	Game show	Rosa García Caro
Los jinetes del alba	1990	Drama series	Victoria Abril, Jorge Sanz and Maribel Verdú
José Mota Live Show	2023	Comedy	José Mota and Patricia Conde
José Mota presenta	2015–2016	Comedy	José Mota
José Mota no News	2024	Comedy	José Mota
Juan y José show	2004–2006	Comedy	Cruz y Raya
Juan y Manuela	1974	Sitcom	Jaime Blanch and Ana Diosdado
Juanita, la Larga	1982	Drama series	Violeta Cela and Conrado San Martín
Juega con nosotros	1991	Game show	Jordi Hurtado
Juegas o qué	2019	Game show	Luis Larrodera
El Juego de la foca	1972–1974	Game show	Félix Acaso and José Miguel Flores
El Juego de la oca	1966–1967	Game show	Joaquín Soler Serrano
Juego de letras	1972–1973	Game show	Joaquín Soler Serrano
El Juego de los errores	1982–1983	Game show	Joaquín Calvo Sotelo and Isabel Borondo
Juego de niños	1989–1991, 2019	Game show	Amparo Soler Leal, Ignacio Salas, Tina Sáinz and Javier Sardá
Juegos para mayores	1971	Drama series	
Juegos sin fronteras	1988–1992	Game show	Ignacio Salas, Guillermo Summers and Isabel Gemio
El Juglar y la reina	1978–1979	Drama series	
Jugamos en casa	2015	Game show	Los Morancos
Jugando con las estrellas	2017	Game show	Jaime Cantizano
Juguemos al trivial	1992	Game show	Pepe Navarro
Juicio Sumarísimo	1958–1959	Science	Tico Medina and Yale
Juncal	1987	Drama series	Francisco Rabal
Juntas, pero no revueltas	1995–1996	Sitcom	Mercedes Sampietro, Mónica Randall and Kiti Manver
Juvenil cultural	1982	Children	Daniel Vindel
Kilómetro lanzado	1966	Game show	Federico Gallo and José Luis Barcelona
El Kiosco	1984–1987	Children	Verónica Mengod
La Moderna	2023-2025	Soap Opera	Teresa Hurtado de Ory
Langostino	1987	Comedy	Jordi Estadella
Lápiz y papel	1981	Game show	Ángel Quesada and José Carabias
Late Xou	2023-2026	Late Night	Marc Giró
The Law of the Sea	2024	Mini-seroes	Luis Tosar and Blanca Portillo
Lazos de sangre	2018–2024	Documentary	
¿Le conoce usted?	1974–1975	Game show	Pedro Ruiz
Lecciones de tocador	1983	Sitcom	Rafael Alonso and Luis Varela
Lección de ocio	1964–1965	Variety show	José Luis Barcelona
El Lector	1994–1996	Science	Agustín Remesal
El Legado	2015	Game show	Ramón García
Lengua viva	1977–1978	Science	Manuel Criado de Val
Leo contra todos	1984	Game show	Rita Irasema
Leonart	2006–2009	Game show	Iván Labanda and Jordi Soriano
Letra pequeña	1984–1986	Science	Isabel Tenaille
Letris	2013	Game show	Carlos Latre
La Ley y la vida	2000	Drama series	Toni Cantó
El Libro gordo de Petete	1981–1983	Children	María del Carmen Goñi
Los Libros	1974–1977	Drama series	
Línea 900	1991–2007	Science	
Lingo	1993–1996	Game show	Ramoncín
La Lista	2008–2010	Game show	Daniel Domenjó and Carlos Sobera
Llamada al corazón	1964	Reality show	Federico Gallo and Enrique Rubio
Llamada al diálogo	1966	Talk show	Victoriano Fernández de Asís
La Llamada de la suerte	1998	Game show	Ramón García and Concha Galán
La Llamada de los gnomos	1987	Children	
Llave en mano	1991	Game show	Marisa Medina
Llegada internacional	1973–1974	Comedy	Luis Aguilé and Paloma Hurtado
Lluvia de estrellas	2007	Talent show	Sonia Ferrer
Lo de Tip y Coll	1974–1975	Comedy	Tip y Coll
Lo que en tiempos se llevó	1995	Videos	Guillermo Summers and Susana Hernández
Lo que hay que tener	1995	Variety show	Leticia Sabater
Lo siguiente	2018–2019	Variety Show	Raquel Sánchez-Silva
Lo tuyo es puro teatro	1998–2000	Theatre	Natalia Dicenta
El Loco de la colina	2006	Interviews	Jesús Quintero
La Locomotora	1979	Children	Torrebruno
Locos por la tele	1990–1991	Game show	Ferran Rañé
Lolita tiene un plan	2017	Talk show	Lolita Flores
Longitud, latitud	1992	Science	Felipe Mellizo
Lorca, muerte de un poeta	1987	Drama series	Nickolas Grace
Luces en la noche	1966–1974	Variety show	
La Luna	1989–1990	Interviews	Julia Otero
Luna negra	2003–2004	Soap opera	Lorena Bernal
Los Lunes con Ángel	1964–1965	Comedy	Ángel de Andrés
Los Lunnis	2003–2010	Children	Lucrecia
Luz verde	1966–1968	Science	Natalia Figueroa
Made in China	2005	Science	Óscar Terol
Maestros de la costura	2018–	Talent Show	Raquel Sánchez-Silva
Magia potagia	1988	Variety show	Juan Tamariz
Makinavaja	1995–1997	Sitcom	Pepe Rubianes
Malaka	2019	Drama Series	Maggie Civantos
Malas lenguas	2025- ¿?	Talk show	Jesús Cintora
Mamás y papás a la vista	2018	Docu-Reality	
La Mandrágora	1997–2009	Science	Rocío Muñoz
Los Maniáticos	1974	Sitcom	José Sazatornil
Mano a mano	1981	Interviews	Joaquim Maria Puyal
Manos al volante	1968–1970	Science	Enrique Rubio and Marisa Medina
La Mansión de los Plaff	1979–1981	Children	María Fernanda D'Ocón
Mañana es sábado	1966–1967	Variety show	Elvira Quintillá
Mañana puede ser verdad	1964–1965	Drama series	Narciso Ibáñez Serrador
La Mañana de La 1	2009–2020	Variety show	Mariló Montero
Mañanas de primera	1996	Variety show	Laura Valenzuela
Mañaneros	2023-	Variety show	Jaime Cantizano
Mapi	2022	Quiz Show	Jandro
La Mar, ese mundo maravilloso	1968–1969	Science	Mario Beut
Los Marginados	1982–1991	Documentary	Carmen Sarmiento
Maridos y mujeres	1997	Game show	Alonso Caparrós and Anne Igartiburu
El Martes que viene	1990	Interviews	Mercedes Milá
Más allá	1976–1981	Science	Fernando Jiménez del Oso
Más estrellas que en el cielo	1988–1989	Interviews	Terenci Moix
Más lejos	1971–1973	Sports	Juan Antonio Fernández Abajo and José Félix Pons
Más que en vivo	2014	Music	Berta Collado and Jordi Mestre
Más vale prevenir	1979–1987	Science	Ramón Sánchez Ocaña
La Máscara negra	1982	Drama series	Sancho Gracia
MasterChef	2013–	Talent show	Eva González
MasterChef Celebrity	2016–	Talent show	Eva González
La matemática del espejo	2021–2024	Talk show	Carlos del Amor
Una matemática viene a verte	2023	Science	Clara Grima
El Mayorazgo de Labraz	1983	Drama series	Joaquín Hinojosa and Virginia Mataix
Media hora con...	1966	Interviews	Raúl Matas
Media naranja	1986	Sitcom	Amparo Larrañaga and Iñaki Miramón
La mejor canción jamás cantada	2019	Music	Roberto Leal
Mejor contigo	2021-2022	Talk show	Ion Aramendi
El mejor de la historia	2024	Variety Show	Silvia Intxaurrondo
Los Mejores años	2009	Music	Carlos Sobera and Ángel Llàcer
Memoria de España	2004	Documentary	
Memorias del cine español	1978	Documentary	Joaquim Maria Puyal
Menos lobos	1992	Sitcom	Miguel Rellán
El Menú de cada día	1992–1993	Cooking show	Karlos Arguiñano
El Menú de Karlos Arguiñano	1994–1995	Cooking show	Karlos Arguiñano
Menudos Torres	2002	Cooking show	Torres Brothers
Mercado Central	2019–2021	Soap opera	Antonio Garrido and Lola Marceli
Metrópolis	1985-	Culture	
Mi abuelo es el mejor	2006	Game show	Concha Velasco
Mi cole es rural	2023-2024	Culture	Raúl Bermejo
Mi familia en la mochila	2015-2022	Docudrama	
Mi hijo y yo	1962–1963	Sitcom	María Fernanda Ladrón de Guevara and Juan Diego
Mi no comprender	1977	Variety show	Alfredo Amestoy
Mi planeta	2003	Science	Óscar Martínez
Mi teniente	2001	Sitcom	Juan Luis Galiardo
Miguel Servet, la sangre y la ceniza	1989	Drama series	Juanjo Puigcorbé
Millenium	2014–2019	Science	Ramón Colom
Un Millón para el mejor	1968–1969	Game show	Joaquín Prat and José Luis Pécker
El ministerio del tiempo	2015–2020	Drama series	Rodolfo Sancho and Hugo Silva
Mira 2	1991	Variety show	Concha García Campoy
¡Mira quién baila!	2005–2007	Talent show	Anne Igartiburu
Miradas 2	2004–2006	Culture	Georgina Cisquella
Mirador de los deportes	1980	Sports	Miguel Ors
Mis terrores favoritos	1981	Movies	Narciso Ibáñez Serrador and Luisa Armenteros
Misión Eurovisión	2007	Music	Paula Vázquez
Misterios al descubierto	1966–1970	Science	Luis Miravitlles
Los misterios de Laura	2009–2011	Drama series	María Pujalte
Un Mito llamado	1979	Drama series	Nuria Torray
La Mitad invisible	2010–2016	Variety show	Juan Carlos Ortega
Mitomanía	1995–2001	Videos	Guillermo Summers and Susana Hernández
Mixto con...	1982	Variety show	José María Fraguas
Modelo para armar	1997	Variety show	Clara Isabel Francia
Mónica a medianoche	1973	Variety show	Mónica Randall
El Monstruo de Sanchezstein	1977–1978	Children	María Luisa Seco and José Carabias
Morancos 007	2007	Comedy	Los Morancos
Mucha marcha	1996–1999	Children	Leticia Sabater
Muchachada Nui	2007–2010	Comedy	Joaquín Reyes
Muévete en casa	2020	Sport	Cesc Escolá
Una Mujer de su casa	1972	Sitcom	Elvira Quintillá
La Mujer de tu vida	1990	Drama series	Carmen Maura and Victoria Abril
Mujeres	2006	Drama series	Chiqui Fernández
Mujeres insólitas	1977	Drama series	
Mujeres solas	1960–1961	Sitcom	Amparo Baró and Alicia Hermida
Mundo de Juan Lobón	1989	Drama series	Luis Fernando Alvés and Maribel Verdú
El Mundo de la música	1976–1980	Music	Mari Ángeles Morales
El Mundo de la televisión	1975–1976	Variety show	Santiago Vázquez
El Mundo en 24 horas	2000–2001	News	Felipe Sahagún
El Mundo en acción	1973–1978	Documentary	Miguel de la Quadra-Salcedo
El Mundo es nuestro	1986–1987	Children	Francisco García Novell
¿Un Mundo feliz?	1981–1987	Science	Felipe Mellizo
Mundo noche	1977-1978	Music	Miguel de los Santos
Un Mundo para ellos	1979–1983	Science	Santiago Vázquez
Mundo pop	1974	Music	Fernando Garciapelayo
Los mundos de Yupi	1987–1989	Children	
La Música	1967	Music	María Mahor
Música ligerísima	2014–2015	Music	
Música, maestro	1981	Music	Carlos Tena
Música sí	1997–2004	Music	Hugo de Campos
Música uno	2004–2006	Music	Ainhoa Arbizu and Neil Solé
Música y estrellas	1976	Music	Marujita Díaz
Musica N.A.	1990-1991	Music	Lara López; focuses on New Age music.
Musical	1967	Music	José Luis Barcelona and Paca Gabaldón
Musical 14, 05	1965–1967	Music	Ángel de Andrés
Musical express	1980–1983	Music	Àngel Casas
Musical pop	1974–1976	Music	Ramón Trecet
Musical popular, cita con...	1980	Music	Aurora Claramunt
Musiqueando	1977	Music	Eva Gloria
Musiquísimos	1987–1988	Music	Rafa Izurquiza
Muy personal	1987–1988	Interviews	Pilar Trenas
Nada del otro mundo	2023	Talk Show	Pedro Ruiz
Navidades con Samantha	2025	Cooking show	Samantha Vallejo-Nágera
El Negociador	2007	Game show	Javier Capitán
Los Negocios de mamá	1997	Sitcom	Rocío Dúrcal
Negro sobre blanco	1997–2004	Culture	Fernando Sánchez Dragó
Ni a tontas, ni a locas	1989	Comedy	Las Virtudes
Ni contigo ni sin ti	1998	Sitcom	Pedro Osinaga, Fiorella Faltoyano and Cristina Brondo
Ni en vivo ni en directo	1983–1984	Comedy	Emilio Aragón
Ninette y un señor de Murcia	1984	Sitcom	Juanjo Menéndez and Victoria Vera
Nivel de vida	1968–1970	Science	Blanca Álvarez, Maruja Callaved and Marisa Medina
Los Niños no sois tan niños	1976	Children	Manolo Codeso
No disparen al pianista	2007–2009	Music	Ruth Jiménez
No me cortes	1993	Children	César Heinrych
No me cortes 98	1998	Children	Juanra Bonet
No me lo puedo creer	1994	Game show	Ángeles Martín
No sé bailar	1992	Sitcom	Emilio Gutiérrez Caba.
No sé de que me hablas	2023-2024	Talk Show	Mercedes Milá
No se quede sin saberlo	1963	Science	Antolín García
No te lo pierdas	1990	Children	Enrique Simón and Leticia Sabater
No te rías, que es peor	1990–1995	Comedy	Jordi Estadella and Ramón García
No veas	1997–1998	Variety show	Pepe Viyuela and Marlène Mourreau
La Noche	1989	Interviews	Fernando Sánchez Dragó
La Noche abierta	1998–2004	Interviews	Pedro Ruiz
La Noche al hablar	1964	Sitcom	Adolfo Marsillach
La Noche D	2021-2022	Comedy	Dani Rovira
Noche de estrellas	1964–1965	Variety show	Franz Johan and Gustavo Re
Noche de fiesta	1999–2004	Variety show	Juncal Rivero and María José Suárez
La Noche de los castillos	1995–1996	Game show	Luis Fernando Alvés
Noche de los cazadores, La	2022-2026	Quiz Show	Ion Aramendi.
La Noche de Quintero	2007	Interviews	Jesús Quintero
Noche de teatro	1974	Theatre	
La Noche del cine español	1984–1986	Movies	Fernando Méndez Leite
Noche del sábado	1965–1968	Variety show	Franz Johan and Gustavo Re
La Noche temática	1995-	Documentary	
Noches de Europa	1968–1969	Science	
Noches de gala	1993–1994	Variety show	Joaquín Prat and Miriam Díaz Aroca
Nosotras y ellos	1966–1967	Sitcom	Julia Martínez and Carlos Muñoz
Nosotros	1968	Variety show	Manuel Martín Ferrand and Alfredo Amestoy
Nosotros	1982–1984	Children	Francisco García Novell
Noticiario femenino	1963	News	Ana María Solsona
Novela	1962–1979	Drama Series	
La Nube	2012	Science	Toni Garrido
Nuestra Europa	1989–1990	News	Secundino González
Nuestra semana	1986	News	Adela Cantalapiedra
La Nueva geografía	1963	Science	Jesús Álvarez
Nuevas gentes	1968–1969	Science	Natalia Figueroa
El Nuevo espectador	1989–1990	Culture	Eduardo Sotillos
Número 1	1987–1988	Music	Ángel Prieto and Raquel Aparicio
Nunca es tarde	1984	Theatre	Irene Gutiérrez Caba
Nunca se sabe	1986	Variety show	Joaquín Kremel
El Obispo leproso	1990	Drama series	Mercedes Sampietro
Objetivo indiscreto	1965	Videos	Simón Cabido
Objetivo indiscreto	1992	Videos	Antonio Resines and Anabel Alonso
Objetivo	1981–1982	Documentary	Luis Pancorbo, Jesús González Green and Carmen Sarmiento
Objetivo nosotros	1975	Science	Doctor Rosado
Obra completa	1971	Theatre	Pedro Amalio López
Obsesión	2005	Soap opera	Diana Lázaro
Ochéntame otra vez	2014–2021	Documentary	
Odiosas	2006	Sitcom	Laura Manzanedo
La Odisea	1976	Drama series	Ferrán Rañé
Odiseas digitales	2003–2004	Science	
El ojo clínico	2016	Science	Ana Gugel
El Ojo público del ciudadano	2007	Science	Juan Ramón Lucas
Ojos nuevos	1970–1972	Science	Jana Escribano
La Olimpiada del saber	1964–1965	Sports	Daniel Vindel
El Olivar de Atocha	1988–1989	Drama series	Enriqueta Carballeira
Olmos y Robles	2015–2016	Sitcom	Rubén Cortada and Pepe Viyuela
Omaita en la primera	2001	Comedy	Los Morancos
Operación torpedo	1974	Comedy	José Miguel Flores
Operación triunfo	2001–2004; 2017–2020	Talent show	Carlos Lozano & Roberto Leal
Opinión pública	1969	News	Federico Gallo
Opinión pública	1978–1981	News	Alberto Delgado and Nieves Romero
Orbe	1961	Variety show	José Luis Barcelona
Órbita Laika	2014–	Science	Ángel Martín
Original	1974–1977	Drama series	Sergi Schaaff
OT: El reencuentro	2016	Documentary	
Otoño romántico	1973	Drama series	Vicente Parra
Ovejas eléctricas	2024	Comedy	Berto Romero
La Otra cara del espejo	1965	Drama series	Manuel Dicenta
La otra mirada	2018–2019	Drama Series	Patricia López Arnaiz
Otras cosas	1981–1982	Variety show	Joaquín Prat
Otros pueblos	1983–2007	Documentary	Luis Pancorbo
Pablo y Virginia	1968	Sitcom	Conchita Montes and Carlos Mendy
Paco y Veva	2004	Sitcom	Hugo Silva and Elena Ballesteros
Pacífico	2016	Documentary	Daniel Landa
Padres en apuros	2003–2006	Science	Belinda Washington, Verónica Mengod and Gema Balbás
Página 2	2007–2009	Culture	Óscar López
Página de sucesos	1985–1986	Drama series	Patxi Andión and Iñaki Miramón
Página del domingo	1975–1976	News	José Luis Rodríguez Puértolas
Páginas sueltas	1970	Drama series	
Un País de sagitario	1985	Variety show	Silvia Arlet
Un País en danza	2021-2022	Documentary	Antonio Najarro
Un País en la mochila	1995–2000	Documentary	José Antonio Labordeta
Un país mágico	2017–2023	Variety show	Miguelillo
Un País para comérselo	2010–2014	Documentary	Imanol Arias and Juan Echanove
Un País para escucharlo	2019-¿?	Music	Ariel Rot
Un País para leerlo	2022-	Documentary	Mario Obrero.
Un País para reírlo	2021-2022	Comedy	Goyo Jiménez
Paisaje con figuras	1976–1977	Drama series	Mario Camus and Antonio Gala
El paisano	2018–2021	Documentary	Pablo Chiapella
Pajareando	1970	Comedy	Andrés Pajares
La Palabra más larga	1966	Game show	Mario Beut
Palabra por palabra	2005–2011	Game show	Francine Gálvez
Los Paladines	1972	Drama series	Ricardo Palacios
Palma y Don Jaime	1959–1960	Sitcom	José Luis López Vázquez and Pastor Serrador
Palmarés	1976	Variety show	Bárbara Rey
La Palmera	1991	Variety show	Jordi González
Palmo a palmo	1970	Sports	Juan Antonio Fernández Abajo and Teresa Gimpera
Panorama de actualidad	1963–1970	News	Santiago Vázquez and Pedro Erquicia
Panorama	1960–1963	News	Federico Gallo and Enrique Rubio
Pantalla deportiva	1959–1963	Sports	Matías Prats Cañete
Pantalla grande	1967–1968	Movies	Luis Pruneda
Para todos la Dos	2010–	Variety show	Montse Tejera and Juanjo Pardo
Para vosotras	1964	Variety show	Montserrat Cierco
Paraíso	2000–2003	Drama series	Luis Fernando Alvés
Paraísos cercanos	1997	Documentary	
Parlamento	1980–1990	News	Manuel Almendros, Alberto Delgado and Santiago López Castillo
Pasa la vida	1991–1996	Variety show	María Teresa Campos
Pasa sin llamar	2025	Variety Show	Inés Hernand and Alba Carrillo
Pasaporte a Dublín	1970	Music	Julio Iglesias and Massiel
Un Paseo por el tiempo	1995	Variety show	Julia Otero
The Patients of Dr. García	2023	Mini-Series	Javier Rey
Patos y ocas	1981	Comedy	Máximo
Los Pazos de Ulloa	1985	Drama series	José Luis Gómez, Victoria Abril and Charo López
PC adictos	1997	Science	Sabin Egilior
Pecadores impequeibols	2014	Comedy	Forges
Pedro I el Cruel	1989	Drama series	Ramon Madaula
Peligrosamente juntas	1992	Interviews	Inka Martí and Marisol Galdón
Pelotas	2009–2010	Sitcom	Ángel de Andrés López
La Peluquería	2017	Sitcom	Chiqui Fernández
El Peor programa de la semana	1993–1994	Comedy	El Gran Wyoming
Pepa y Pepe	1995	Sitcom	Verónica Forqué and Tito Valverde
Peque Prix	1998–2000	Children	Ramón García and Carlos Castel
La Pequeña comedia	1966–1968	Theatre	
Pequeño estudio	1968–1974	Theatre	
Pequeños grandes genios	2001–2003	Children	Carlos Larrañaga and Àngel Llàcer
Perdóname	1994	Reality show	María Teresa Campos
Perfiles	1979	Interviews	Joaquín Soler Serrano
Pero... ¿esto qué es?	1989–1991	Comedy	Luis Merlo, Jacqueline de la Vega, Guillermo Montesinos, Marisa Naranjo
El Perro verde	1988	Interviews	Jesús Quintero
Personajes a trasluz	1970	Drama series	
Las Pícaras	1983	Drama series	
El Pícaro	1974	Drama series	Fernando Fernán Gómez
Piel de España	1962–1963	Science	Jesús Álvarez
Piensa en positivo	2013	Public service	Pablo Pineda
Pilares del tiempo, Los	2022-2024	Culture	Leonor Martín and Lidia San José
Pili, secretaria ideal	1975	Sitcom	Elena María Tejeiro and José María Prada
Pinnic	1992–1996	Children	Pere Ponce
Los Pintores del Prado	1974	Science	
Pista libre	1982–1985	Children	Sandra Sutherland and Izaskun Azurmendi
Plan América	2008	Drama series	José Sancho
Plan de tarde	2023	Variety Show	Toñi Moreno
Planeta azul	1970–1974	Documentary	Félix Rodríguez de la Fuente
Planeta comida	2014	Cooking	
El Planeta de los niños	2002–2003	Science	Miriam de las Heras and Belinda Washington
Planeta encantado	2003	Science	Juan José Benítez
Planeta imaginario	1983–1986	Children	Marta Angelat
Plano general	2023-	Talk show	Jenaro Castro
Planta baja	1986	Sitcom	Enrique Simón
Plàstic	1989–1991	Music	Tinet Rubira, David Bagès and Marisol Galdón
Platea	1963	Theatre	
Platos rotos	1985–1986	Sitcom	María José Alfonso
Plató vacío	1986	Culture	Cristina Morató
Plaza, La	2023	Variety Show	Jordi González
Plaza de España	1962–1963	Variety show	Alfredo Amestoy
Plaza de España	2011	Sitcom	Gorka Otxoa
Plinio	1972	Drama series	Antonio Casal and Alfonso del Real
Plumier	1986–1987	Children	Almudena Solana
Plutón B.R.B. Nero	2008–2009	Sitcom	Manuel Tallafé
Poder canijo	2016	Children	Juan y Medio
Polideportivo	1973–1981	Sports	Juan Antonio Fernández Abajo, José Félix Pons and José Ángel de la Casa
Ponte las pilas	1991–1992	Music	Benjamin Barrington, Arancha de Benito and Dani Martín
Pop que	1984	Music	Carlos Tena
Popgrama	1977–1981	Music	Carlos Tena and Diego A. Manrique
Por arte de magia	1981–1982	Variety show	Juan Tamariz
Por fin has llegado	2007	Comedy	Josema Yuste
Por la mañana	1987–1989	Variety show	Jesús Hermida
Por la mañana	2002–2008	Variety show	Inés Ballester
Por los caminos de España	1966	Science	
Por los caminos del folklore	1976	Music	Antoñita Moreno
Por tierra, mar y aire	1968–1972	News	Ángel Losada and Pedro Macía
Por tierras lejanas	1981–1982	Documentary	Alberto Oliveras
El Porvenir es largo	2009	Soap opera	Silvia Marsó
Positrón	1987	Children	Carlos Ballesteros
El Precio justo	1988–1993/1999–2001	Game show	Joaquín Prat and Carlos Lozano
Preguntas al espacio	1958	Game show	Laura Valenzuela
La Prehistoria del futuro	1974	Science	Luis Miravitlles
Premio al mejor	1971	Game show	Juan Antonio Fernández Abajo
El Premio	1968–1969	Drama series	Narciso Ibáñez Serrador
Préstame tu vida	2005	Reality show	Ana García Lozano
Prêt-à-porter	1993	Sitcom	Francisco Morán
Primer aplauso	1959–1966	Talent show	José Luis Barcelona and Ángel Losada
Primera fila	1962–1965	Theatre	
Primera función	1989	Theatre	
Primera hora	1974–1975	Science	Félix Rodríguez de la Fuente
La Pr1mera pregunta	2020	Variety show	Lluís Guilera
El Primero de la clase	2006	Science	Antonio Hidalgo and Eduardo Punset
Primero izquierda	1991–1992	Interviews	Carlos Herrera
Proceso a Mariana Pineda	1984	Drama series	Pepa Flores
Prodigios	2019–2021	Talent show	Boris Izaguirre
El Programa de Carlos Herrera	1997–1998	Interviews	Carlos Herrera
La Promesa	2023-	Soap Opera	María Castro
Promesas de arena	2019	Drama series	Daniel Grao and Blanca Portillo
Protagonista, el hombre	1967–1968	Science	Federico Gallo
Protagonistas del recuerdo	2006	Science	
Próximamente	1982–1983	Variety show	Marisa Medina and Isabel Bauzá
El Pueblo más divertido	2014	Game show	Mariló Montero and Millán Salcedo
Un Pueblo para Europa	1970	Game show	Pedro Macía
El puente de las mentiras	2023	Game show	Paula Vázquez
Puerta con puerta	1999	Sitcom	Juan Luis Galiardo and Sancho Gracia
La Puerta del misterio	1982–1984	Science	Fernando Jiménez del Oso
Puerta grande	1970	Variety show	Alfredo Amestoy
Puesta a punto	1983–1985	Sports	Eva Nasarre
Punto de encuentro	1985–1987	Variety show	Pedro Macía
Punto de vista	1963–1966	News	Manuel Calvo Hernando
Punto y aparte	1985–1991	News	Manuel Campo Vidal
Pura coincidencia	1973	Comedy	Tip y Coll
Pura magia	2017–2018	Variety show	Mag Lari
Pyramid	2025	Quiz show	Itziar Miranda
¡Qué animal!	2017–2023	Science	Evelyn Segura
¿Qué apostamos?	1993–2000	Game show	Ramón García and Ana Obregón
¡Qué grande es el cine!	1995–2005	Movies	José Luis Garci
¡Qué noche la de aquel año!	1987	Music	Miguel Ríos
¿Qué pintamos aquí?	1985–1986	Drama series	Francisco Rabal
Qué sabe nadie	1990	Interviews	Jesús Quintero
Que usted lo mate bien	1979	Theatre	
Que viene Muzzy	1987	Children	Juan Antonio Ollero and Izaskun Azurmendi
Querido cabaret	1990	Music	Guillermina Motta
Querido Pirulí	1988	Interviews	Fernando García Tola
Queridos cómicos	1992	Theatre	
Quién con quién	1999	Game show	Jaime Bores
¿Quién dice la verdad?	1965–1966	Game show	Juan Antonio Fernández Abajo
Quién educa a quién	2020	Talk show	Mamen Asencio
¿Quién es quién?	1963–1965	Game show	Federico Gallo and Juan Manuel Soriano
¿Quién es?	1976	Game show	Manuel Calvo Hernando
¿Quién manda aquí?	2014	Quiz show	Javier Estrada
Quién sabe dónde	1992–1998	Variety show	Francisco Lobatón
¿Quién tiene la palabra?	1963–1964	Science	Juan Manuel Soriano
¡Quiero bailar!	2008	Music	Josep Lobató
El Quijote de Miguel de Cervantes	1991	Drama series	Fernando Rey and Alfredo Landa
La Quiniela	1968–1970	Sports	Santiago Vázquez
La Quinta esfera	2003	Game show	Jorge Fernández
El Quinto jinete	1975	Drama series	
Ramón y Cajal	1982	Drama series	Adolfo Marsillach
Raquel busca su sitio	2000	Drama series	Cayetana Guillén Cuervo
Rasgos	1982	Interviews	Mónica Randall
La Realidad inventada	1988	Culture	Paloma Chamorro
El Recreo	1977–1978	Children	Torrebruno and Paula Gardoqui
Recuerda cuándo	1987	Drama series	Manuel Galiana
Redacción noche	1976–1979	News	Joaquín Arozamena, José Antonio Silva and Santiago López Castillo
Redes	1996–2013	Science	Eduardo Punset
Refrito	1981	Comedy	José Luis Coll
La Regenta	1995	Drama series	Aitana Sánchez-Gijón
Régimen abierto	1986	Drama series	Álvaro de Luna, Pilar Velázquez and Silvia Tortosa
Las Reglas del juego	1977–1978	Game show	José Antonio Jáuregui
Reina por un día	1964	Game show	José Luis Barcelona and Mario Cabré
Remite: Maribel	1970	Sitcom	Tina Sáinz
Repor	2007-	Documentary	
Los Reporteros	1974–1976	Documentary	Javier Basilio, Diego Carcedo and Jesús González Green
Réquiem por Granada	1991	Drama series	Manuel Bandera
El Retorno de Omaita	2003	Comedy	Los Morancos
Retrato en vivo	1979–1982	Interviews	Miguel de los Santos
Retratos con alma	2018	Interviews	Isabel Gemio
la Revista	1995-1996	Music	
Revista de cine	1974–1981	Movies	Alfonso Eduardo
Revista de toros	1971–1983	Bullfighting	Mariví Romero
Revista para la mujer	1963–1967	Variety show	Maruja Fernández, María del Carmen Goñi and Pedro Macía
Revistero	1975–1976	Variety show	Tico Medina, Isabel Tenaille and Jana Escribano
La revuelta	2024-	Late Night	David Broncano
El Rey de la comedia	2007	Comedy	Eduard Soto and Esther Arroyo
Rimas populares	1969–1970	Variety show	Antolín García
La Risa española	1969	Theatre	
Risas y estrellas	1997–1999	Variety show	Paloma Lago, José Luis Moreno and Loreto Valverde
Ritmo 70	1970	Music	José María Íñigo and Pepe Palau
Ritmo	1962–1960	Music	Carmina Alonso
El Rival más débil	2002–2004	Game show	Nuria González and Karmele Aranburu
Robles, investigador	2000	Drama series	Antonio Resines
Rockambole	1989	Music	El Gran Wyoming
Rockopop	1988–1992	Music	Beatriz Pécker
Rompecocos	1996–1997	Game show	Paco Vegara
Ronda de España	1963–1964	Music	Antoñita Moreno
La Ronda	1991	Interviews	Julia Otero
El Rondo	2005–2007	Sports	Juan Carlos Rivero, Quique Guash and Lourdes García Campos
Rosi y los demás	1963	Sitcom	Félix Navarro
RTVE responde	2008-	Variety show	Elena Sánchez
Rueda de prensa	1965–1966	Interviews	Victoriano Fernández de Asís
Ruffus & Navarro Unplugged	2005–2006	Late night	Pepe Navarro
Ruralitas	2020–2023	Documentary	
Ruta Quetzal	1993-	Children	Miguel de la Quadra-Salcedo
Rutas bizarras	2021–2022	Travel	Marta Hazas and Xosé Antonio Touriñán
Sabadabada	1981–1983	Children	Torrebruno, Mayra Gómez Kemp and Sonia Martínez
El Sábado	2005	Variety show	Minerva Piquero
Sábado 64	1964–1965	Variety show	Clara Isabel Francia and Carmina Alonso
Sábado cine	1977	Movies	Manuel Martín Ferrand
Sábado noche	1987–1989	Variety show	Toni Cantó, Carlos Herrera and Bibiana Fernández
Sábado noche	2006	Variety show	Josema Yuste and Nani Gaitán
Sábado revista	1989–1990	Variety show	Manuel Almendros and María San Juan
Saber vivir	1997–2009	Science	Manuel Torreiglesias
Saber y Ganar	1997-	Game show	Jordi Hurtado
Los Sabios	1984–1986	Children	Andrés Caparrós, Isabel Gemio and Miguel Ángel Jenner
Sabuesos	2018	Drama Series	Salva Reina
Sacalalengua	2009	Variety show	Ana Solanes
La saga de los Rius	1976–1977	Drama series	Fernando Guillén
El Salero	1990–1991	Music	José Manuel Parada and Trinidad Iglesias
Salto a la fama	1963–1965	Talent show	José Luis Barcelona and José Luis Uribarri
Sánchez y Carbonell	2020	Talk show	Elena S. Sánchez and Pablo Carbonell
Sandino	1994	Drama series	Joaquim de Almeida
Sara y Punto	1990	Variety show	Sara Montiel
Se hace saber	2014	Comedy	Goyo Jiménez
¿Se puede?	2004	Sitcom	Lina Morgan
El Secreto	2001	Telenovela	Lorena Bernal
El Secreto de la porcelana	1999	Drama series	Eusebio Poncela
Secretos de familia	1994	Variety show	Ángeles Martín and Paula Vázquez
Secuencia	1966	Science	Luis Pruneda
La Segunda cadena informa	1968	News	Rosa María Mateo
Segunda enseñanza	1986	Drama series	Ana Diosdado
La Segunda oportunidad	1978–1979	Science	Paco Costas
Segundos fuera	1986	Comedy	Ignacio Salas and Guillermo Summers
Seguridad vital	2015–2018	Science	Marta Solano and Carlos García Hirschfeld
Seis hermanas	2015–2017	Soap opera	María Castro
El Semáforo	1995–1999	Comedy	Jordi Estadella and Asunción Embuena
La Semana	1974–1978	Children	Francisco García Novell and Carmen Lázaro
La Semana que viene	1970–1971	Variety show	José Luis Uribarri
El Seneca	1967–1970	Drama series	Antonio Martelo
El Señor Villanueva y su gente	1979	Sitcom	Ismael Merlo and Lola Herrera
La Señora	2008	Drama series	Rodolfo Sancho
La Señora García se confiesa	1976–1977	Drama	Lucía Bosé and Adolfo Marsillach
¡Señoras y señores!	1973–1976	Variety show	Valerio Lazarov, Norma Duval, Ángela Carrasco, Fiorella Faltoyano
El Séptimo cielo	1989	Drama series	Mónica Randall
El Séptimo de caballería	1998–1999	Music	Miguel Bosé
Sequía	2022	Drama Series	Elena Rivera.
Servir y proteger	2017–2023	Drama series	Luisa Martín
El Sexólogo	1994	Sitcom	Antonio Ozores
El Show de Flo	2002–2003	Comedy	Florentino Fernández
El Show de La Primera	1992–1993	Variety show	Fernando Carrillo, Kim Manning and Concha Galán
Si las piedras hablaran	1972–1973	Science	Natalia Figueroa
Si lo sé no vengo	1985–1988	Game show	Jordi Hurtado
Sí o no	1961–1963	Game show	Joaquín Soler Serrano
Si yo fuera presidente	1983–1985	Interviews	Fernando García Tola
Si yo fuera rico	1973–1974	Sitcom	Antonio Garisa
Siempre en domingo	1971–1972	Variety show	Joaquín Prat, José Luis Uribarri and Juan Antonio Fernández Abajo
Sierra, mar... o nada	1958	Variety show	Tico Medina
Siete días	1974–1981	News	José Antonio Silva, Jesús Álvarez and Isabel Tenaille
Siete piezas cortas	1972	Theatre	
Las Siete y media musical	1973	Music	Luis del Olmo
Silencio, estrenamos	1974	Sitcom	Adolfo Marsillach and Amparo Baró
Silencio se juega	1984	Game show	El Gran Wyoming and Paula Gardoqui
Silencio, vivimos	1962–1963	Sitcom	Adolfo Marsillach
Silencio, se rueda	1961–1962	Sitcom	Adolfo Marsillach
Sin fronteras	1980-1981	Talk Show	Joaquín Soler Serrano
Sin gluten	2025	Comedy	Diego Martín
Sin vergüenza	1992–1993	Game show	Ángeles Martín
Sincronizados	2013	Documentary	
Sobre la marcha	1971–1972	Sports	Julio César Fernández
Sólo goles	1994–1997	Sports	Matías Prats Luque
Solo moda	2012–	Variety show	Nieves Álvarez
Sólo para hombres	1963	Variety show	Ana María Solsona
La Solución... mañana	1970	Variety show	Alfredo Amestoy
La sonata del silencio	2016	Drama Series	Eduardo Noriega
Sonatas	1983	Drama series	Fernando Méndez-Leite
Sonría, por favor	1963–1965	Comedy	Pepe Palau, José Luis Coll and Chumy Chúmez
Sopa de gansos	1989–1991	Children	Rosa León
Sospecha	1963–1971	Drama series	
Splunge	2005	Comedy	Florentino Fernández, Eva Hache and Patricia Conde
Stamos okupa2	2012	Sitcom	Carmen Maura
Stop	1972	Science	Manuel Gil
Su turno	1981–1983	Talk show	Jesús Hermida
Subasta de triunfos	1971–1974	Sports	Daniel Vindel and Antolín García
Suena la copla	1996	Music	Francisco Valladares
Sumarísimo	1978–1979	Comedy	Manuel Codeso and Alfonso del Real
Las Supersabias	1972	Game show	Torrebruno
Superstar	1984	Variety show	Norma Duval
El Supertren	1991	Comedy	Elisa Matilla
Suspiros de España	1974–1975	Drama series	Antonio Ferrandis and Irene Gutiérrez Caba
T con T	2014	Talk show	Toñi Moreno
Tablón de anuncios	1984–1986	Culture	Sonia Grande
Tal como éramos	1998	Variety show	Jaime Bores
Tal como somos	1996	Interviews	Àngel Casas
Tal cual	1988–1989	Interviews	Manuel Hidalgo Ruiz
Tal cual	1992–1996	Interviews	Àngel Casas
Tal para cual	1965	Comedy	Zori y Santos
Taller Mecánico	1991–1992	Sitcom	Antonio Ozores
Tan a gustito	2005–2006	Comedy	Alfonso Arús
Tango	1991	Drama series	Javier Bardem
Tarde de teatro	1986	Theatre	
Tarde para todos	1972–1974	Variety show	Juan Antonio Fernández Abajo, Clara Isabel Francia and Yolanda Ríos
La Tarde	1983–1989	Variety show	Pepe Navarro, María Casanova and Andrés Aberasturi
Tardes de Primera	1996	Variety show	Ramón García and Concha Galán
Tariro, Tariro	1988–1989	Comedy	La Trinca
Tarjeta de visita	1964–1965	Variety show	Juan Manuel Soriano, Mario Beut and Federico Gallo
Te ha tocado	2022	Quiz Show	Raúl Gómez
El Teatro	1974	Theatre	
Teatro Apolo	1958–1960	Theatre	Fernando García de la Vega
Teatro breve	1966–1981	Theatre	
Teatro Club	1976–1978	Theatre	
Teatro de familia	1959–1965	Theatre	
Teatro de humor	1964–1965	Theatre	
Teatro de la TVE	1957–1958	Theatre	
Teatro de misterio	1970	Theatre	
Teatro de siempre	1966–1972	Theatre	
Teatro estudio	1977–1981	Theatre	
Teatro para todos	1965	Theatre	
La Tele de tu vida	2007	Videos	Jesús Hermida
Tele-club	1964–1966	Variety show	Antolín García, Pilar Cañada
Tele-club	1968–1970	Variety show	Alfredo Amestoy
Tele-Madrid	1957	Variety show	Tico Medina and Yale
Tele-Revista	1974–1975	Variety show	Teresa Gimpera, Mónica Randall and Florencio Solchaga
Los Tele-Rodríguez	1957–1958	Sitcom	María Fernanda D'Ocón
Telecomedia de humor	1966–1971	Theatre	
Telecomedia	1974–1975	Theatre	
Telediario	1957-	News	Jesús Álvarez, Ana Blanco, Luis Mariñas, Rosa María Mateo, Lorenzo Milá
Teledomingo	1963–1965	Variety show	Joaquín Díaz-Palacios
Telepasión española	1990–2003	Variety show	
Un Tema para el debate	1965–1968	Talk show	Pilar Miró
Temas	1974	Variety show	Ricardo Fernández Deu
Tendido 13	1966	Bullfighting	Manuel Lozano Sevilla
Tendido cero	1986	Bullfighting	Fernando Fernández Román
Tenemos que hablar	2013	Talk show	Ana García Lozano
Tengo once años	2014	Science	
Tengo un libro en las manos	1959–1966	Science	Luis de Sosa
Tengo una pregunta para usted	2007–2011	Interviews	Lorenzo Milá and Ana Blanco
Las Tentaciones	1970–1971	Drama series	
Tercer grado	1963	Interviews	Tico Medina
El Tercer grado	1997–2004	Interviews	Isabel San Sebastián and Carlos Dávila
El Tercer rombo	1966	Drama series	María Fernanda D'Ocón
Tercera planta, inspección fiscal	1991	Sitcom	José Sazatornil
Tercero izquierda	1963	Sitcom	Elvira Quintillá and José Luis López Vázquez
Teresa de Jesús	1984	Drama series	Concha Velasco
Tertulia con	1981	Talk show	Fernando Fernán Gómez
Testigo directo	1994–1999	News	Ramón Pellicer
That's my jam: Que el ritmo no pare	2025	Talent Show	Arturo Valls
The Floor	2025-¿?	Quiz Show	Chenoa
La Tía de Ambrosio	1971	Sitcom	Rafaela Aparicio and Luis Morris
Tiempo al tiempo	2001–2002	Variety show	Concha Velasco
Tiempo de magia	1976	Variety show	Julio Carabias
El Tiempo en que vivimos	1989–1990	Variety show	Inma de Santis
El tiempo es oro	1987–1992	Game show	Constantino Romero
Tiempo libre	1978–1979	Variety show	Aurora Claramunt
Tiempo y hora	1965	Sitcom	Antonio Ferrandis and Amparo Baró
La Tierra de las 1000 músicas	2005	Music	Joaquín Luqui
Tío Willy	1998–1999	Sitcom	Andrés Pajares
Tips	2016–2017	Variety Show	Ruth Jiménez
Tocao del ala	1997	Sitcom	Ferran Rañé
Tocata	1983–1987	Music	José Antonio Abellán
Todo cambia	2023	Documentary	Ana Blanco
Todo en familia	1999–2001	Game show	Ramón García
Todo es posible en domingo	1974	Variety show	Juan Antonio Fernández Abajo, Kiko Ledgard and Tico Medina
Todo motor	1989	Sports	Jesús Álvarez Cervantes
Todo queda en casa	1986–1987	Game show	Pedro Osinaga
Todo/Fórmula Todo	1969–1972	Variety show	Jesús Álvarez and Blanca Gala
Todos contra uno	2023	Quiz Show	Rodrigo Vázquez
Todos los deportes	1962–1963	Sports	Miguel Ors
Todos somos jóvenes	1968	Children	Patricia Nigel
Todos somos raros, todos somos únicos	2014	Public service	Isabel Gemio
Torneo	1976–1979	Sports	Daniel Vindel
Torres en la cocina	2015–2019	Cooking show	Torres Brothers
Torres y Reyes	2013	Variety	Mara Torres and Joaquín Reyes
La Tortuga perezosa	1961–1968	Comedy	José Luis Coll and Pablo Sanz
TPH Club	1999–2003	Children	Paloma Lago
Trabajo temporal	2016–	Reality show	
Tragedias de la vida vulgar	1964–1965	Sitcom	José Luis Ozores and Antonio Ozores
Traición	2017–2018	Drama Series	Ana Belén
La Transición	1995	Documentary	Victoria Prego
El Tranvía del humor	1957–1958	Comedy	Chumy Chúmez and Álvaro de la Iglesia
Tras la puerta cerrada	1963–1965	Drama series	
Trazos	1977	Culture	Paloma Chamorro
El Tren	1982–1983	Variety show	Mary Carmen
Tres eran tres	1972–1973	Sitcom	Amparo Soler Leal, Julieta Serrano and Emma Cohen
Los Tres mosqueteros	1971	Drama series	Sancho Gracia
Tres puertas, Las	2022-2023	Talk Show	María Casado.
Tribuna internacional	1979–1980	News	Jesús Hermida
Tribuna TV	1967–1968	News	Victoriano Fernández de Asís
Tribunal popular	1989–1991	Talk show	Xavier Foz, Javier Nart and Ricardo Fernández Deu
Trilocos	1999	Children	Miliki
Tristeza de amor	1986	Drama series	Alfredo Landa and Concha Cuetos
Triunfomanía	2002	Music	Carlos Lozano
Tu oportunidad	2013–2014	Reality show	Juanjo Pardo
Tú tranquilo	1965	Sitcom	Antonio Garisa
Turno de oficio	1986–1987	Drama series	Juan Luis Galiardo and Juan Echanove
Turno de oficio: Diez años después	1996	Drama series	Juan Luis Galiardo and Juan Echanove
TVE es noticia	1966	Variety show	José Luis Uribarri and Pilar Cañada
TVEmos	2015–2021	Videos	Elisa Mouliaá
Typical Spanish	2020	Game Show	Frank Blanco
U.C.O.	2009	Drama series	Miguel Ángel Solá
Última frontera	1983–1984	Science	Manuel Toharia
Última hora	1977	News	Pedro Macía
La Última moda	1969	Variety show	Soledad Miranda
Últimas preguntas	1982-	News	María Casanova
El Último café	1970–1972	Sitcom	Antonio Garisa, Valeriano Andrés and Tip y Coll
Último Grito	1968	Music	José María Íñigo and Judy Stephen
Un encargo original	1983	Theatre	
Un, dos, tres... responda otra vez	1972–2004	Game show	Narciso Ibáñez Serrador, Kiko Ledgard, Mayra Gómez-Kemp, Jordi Estadella, Miriam Díaz Aroca, Luis Roderas
Una de dos	1998–1999	Sitcom	Lina Morgan
Una de tres	1994	Sitcom	Luis Fernando Alvés
La Unión hace la fuerza	1964–1966	Game show	Mario Beut and Alberto Oliveras
Uno de los nuestros	2013	Talent show	Carlos Latre
Los Unos y los otros	1994–1995	Interviews	Àngel Casas
Usted, por ejemplo	1982–1984	Science	Manuel Torreiglesias
Valle salvaje	2024-	Soap opera	Manuela Velasco
Vamos a la mesa	1967–1968	Cooking show	Maruja Callaved
Vamos a llevarnos bien	2023	Variety show	Lorena Castell
Vamos a ver	1981–1982	Variety show	Julio César Fernández, Marisa Medina and Isabel Borondo
Vaya crack	2019	Game show	Roberto Leal
Vaya lío	1997	Variety show	Concha Galán
¡Vaya peña!	2001	Variety show	Carlos Lozano
Vaya tele	1994	Comedy	Cruz y Raya
Veraneantes	1984	Drama series	María Luisa San José, Ana María Vidal, Elisa Ramírez
Verano 8'30 pm magazine	1986	Variety show	Ana María Molano
Verano azul	1981	Drama series	Antonio Ferrandis and María Garralón
El Verano de tu vida	2005	Variety show	Jorge Fernández
El Verano ya llegó	2004	Variety show	Paloma Lago and Miguel Ángel Tobías
Verbena	1965	Variety show	Mario Beut
La Verdad de las cosas	1965	Science	César González Ruano
La Verdad de Laura	2002	Soap opera	Mónica Estarreado
La Verdad de...	1979	Variety show	Alfredo Amestoy
Verdad o mentira	1982–1983	Game show	Alberto Oliveras
Versión española	1998-	Movies	Cayetana Guillén Cuervo
Vértigo	1999	Comedy	Antonio Resines and Miriam Díaz Aroca
Viaje al centro de la tele	2013–	Videos	Manu Martínez
Viaje con nosotros	1988	Interviews	Javier Gurruchaga
Viajes alrededor de una pareja	1970	Sitcom	María José Alfonso and Pedro Osinaga
Vicente Ferrer	2014	Drama	Imanol Arias and Aída Folch
Víctor Ros	2015	Drama series	Carles Francino
La Vida	1967	Variety show	Alfredo Amestoy
La Vida de Rita	2003	Sitcom	Verónica Forqué
La Vida en el aire	1998	Drama series	Fiorella Faltoyano
La Vida es juego	1992–1993	Game show	Constantino Romero
Vida salvaje	1970	Science	Félix Rodríguez de la Fuente
La Vida según...	1995	News	Ana Cristina Navarro
La Vida sigue	1988	Variety show	Joaquín Arozamena
Vídeos de primera	1990–1998	Videos	Alfonso Arús, Bermúdez and Alonso Caparrós
Viento, madera y barro	1984	Science	Miguel de los Santos
Villa Rosaura	1994	Sitcom	Rosa María Sardà
Villarriba y Villabajo	1994	Sitcom	Juanjo Puigcorbé and Ana Duato
La Virtud del asesino	1998	Drama series	Sancho Gracia
Visado para el futuro	1963–1965	Science	Luis Miravitlles
La Víspera de nuestro tiempo	1981–1984	Science	José Antonio Silva and Cristina García Ramos
Vísperas	1987	Drama series	Rafael Álvarez
Visto para sentencia	1971	Drama series	Javier Escrivá
Visto y no visto	1982	Variety show	Alfredo Amestoy
Visto y oído	1972	Variety show	Mario Beut
Las Viudas	1977	Drama series	Lola Herrera
Viva el espectáculo	1990–1991	Variety show	Concha Velasco
Viva la ciencia	1990	Science	Manuel Toharia
Vivan los bares	2014	Cooking	Lorena Castell and Juan Makandé
Vive el verano	1999	Variety show	Pedro Rollán
Vivir cada día	1978–1988	Docudrama	José Luis Rodríguez Puértolas
Vivir es lo que importa	1971	Variety show	Antonio Fraguas and Manuel Summers
Vivir para ver	1969	Variety show	
Vivir para ver	1975–1977	Variety show	Alfredo Amestoy
Voces a 45	1975–1976	Music	Pepe Domingo Castaño
Voces de oro	1970–1971	Music	Miguel de los Santos
Voces sin voz	1981–1982	Science	Manuel Torreiglesias
Voluntarios	2004	Variety show	Francine Gálvez
La Voz humana	1986–1988	Music	
La Vuelta al mundo de Willy Fog	1984	Children	
Vuestro amigo Quique	1972–1973	Children	Herta Frankel
Waku waku	1989–1991, 1998–2000	Game show	Consuelo Berlanga and Nuria Roca
X-O da dinero	1959	Game show	Juan Viñas and Estanis González
Xat.TV	2000	Science	Leticia Dolera
Y al final esperanza	1967	Theatre	
¿Y ahora qué...?	2009–2010	Comedy	Josema Yuste and Florentino Fernández
¿Y quién es él?	1994	Variety show	Mari Pau Domínguez
...Y siete	1971	Science	Victoriano Fernández de Asís
Y sin embargo, te quiero	1983–1985	Variety show	Ignacio Salas and Guillermo Summers
Ya semos europeos	1989	Comedy	Albert Boadella
Ya sé que tienes novio	1985	Game show	Constantino Romero
Ya te vale	2008	Children	Gemma Nierga
Yo canto	1977–1978	Music	
Yo de mayor quier ser español	2011	Comedy	Gomaespuma
Yo estuve allí	2008	Variety show	Carolina Ferre
Yo mono	2015	Science	Pablo Herreros
Yo robo, tú chantajeas, ella estafa y además un muerto	1984	Sitcom	Emilio Gutiérrez Caba
Zip zap	1997	Variety show	Belén Rueda
Zona de juego	1993	Game show	Miguel Ortiz
Zona franca	1995–1996	Music	Arancha de Benito and Tony Aguilar

== Bibliography ==
- Baget Herms, José María (1975). 18 años de TVE. Historia de la televisión en España. Madrid: Instituto de Estudios Madrileños. ISBN 9788487799020.
- Capilla, Antoni (1999). Telemanía. Madrid: Salvat. ISBN 84-345-66400.
- Díaz, Lorenzo (2008). 50 años de TVE. Alianza Editorial. ISBN 84-2064-746-2.
- España, Ramón de (2001). La caja de las sorpresas. Editorial Planeta. ISBN 84-08-04066-9.
- Herrero, Miguel (2013). Revisitando los 80. Madrid: Diabolo. ISBN 978-84-15839-38-5.
- Palacio, Manuel (2012). La televisión durante la Transición española. Editorial Cátedra. ISBN 978-84-376-3068-7.
- Sempere Bernal, Antonio. Locos por la tele 2005. ISBN 84-8454-460-5
- Valenzuela, Javier. Usted puede ser tertuliano 2011. Ediciones Península. ISBN 978-84-9942-102-5
