= 1995 in Spain =

- Decades: 1970s; 1980s; 1990s; 2000s; 2010s
- See also: History of Spain; Timeline of Spanish history; List of years in Spain

Events in the year 1995 in Spain.

== Incumbents ==
- Monarch – Juan Carlos I
- Prime Minister of Spain – Felipe González Márquez

== Events ==
- 27 January – The 10th Goya Awards are held where Nobody Will Speak of Us When We're Dead wins the award for best film.
- 9 March – The Spanish fishing ship Estai is captured off the coast of Canada by Canadian officials, starting the Turbot War fishing dispute.
- 13 March – The Statute of Autonomy of Ceuta and Statute of Autonomy of Melilla are passed by the Cortes Generales.
- 18 March – The wedding of Infanta Elena and Jaime de Marichalar is held, the first royal wedding in Spain in 89 years.
- 28 May – The 1995 Spanish regional elections and 1995 Spanish local elections are held simultaneously.
- 23 June – The National Parks Autonomous Agency is formed.
- 27 June – Deportivo de La Coruña wins the 1995 Copa del Rey final.
- 8 November – The 10th Organic Law of Spain is enacted by the Spanish Parliament, establishing the Criminal Code of Spain.
- 11 November – The Bilbao Metro begins operation.
- 23 November – The 1970 Law on dangerousness and social rehabilitation, which had criminalized homosexuality in Spain, is repealed.
- 28 November – The Barcelona Museum of Contemporary Art opens to the public, after three years of delays.
- 11 December – A car bomb attack carried out ETA in Madrid kills 6 people and injures a further 19.

== Births ==
- 1 January – Pepa Millán, politician
- 4 January – María Isabel, singer
- 7 January
  - Enric Mas, cyclist
  - Blanca Padilla, model
- 18 January – José Manuel Díaz, cyclist
- 24 January – Garazi Murua, football
- 27 January – Àlex Monner, actor
- 4 February – Greta Fernández, actress
- 8 February – Miguel Sánchez-Migallón, handball player
- 16 February – Pitita, drag performer
- 27 February – Agustí Sans, basketball player
- 3 March – Cristián Rodríguez, cyclist
- 10 March – Victòria Riba Muns, singer
- 13 March – Maitane López, footballer
- 26 March – Ibai Llanos, streamer
- 1 April – Felipe Orts, cyclist
- 4 April – Ane Iriarte, cyclist
- 8 April – Lierni Lekuona Etxebeste, cyclist
- 16 April – Laura García-Caro, athlete
- 5 May – María Díaz Cirauqui, footballer
- 6 May – Óscar Rodríguez, cyclist
- 26 May – Marta Cardona, footballer
- 27 May – Alicia González Blanco, cyclist
- 28 May – Héctor Carretero, cyclist
- 17 June – Lourdes Mohedano, gymnast
- 20 June – Celia Jiménez, footballer
- 3 July – Mario Vilella Martínez, tennis player
- 9 July – Iraia Iparragirre, footballer
- 10 July – Carmen Campos, handball player
- 12 July – Yulen Pereira, fencer
- 19 July – Begoña García, field hockey player
- 5 August
  - Ziortza Isasi, cyclist
  - Cristina Lara, athlete
- 20 August – Ainhoa Vicente, footballer
- 24 August – Ane Etxezarreta, footballer
- 31 August – Sergio Samitier, cyclist
- 3 September – Veki Velilla, actress
- 18 September – Carlos Mayo, runner
- 19 September – Alex Aranburu, cyclist
- 23 September – Patrick Criado, actor
- 28 September – Juancho Hernangómez, basketball player
- 18 October – Agoney, musician
- 20 November – Iván García Cortina, cyclist
- 29 November – Cristina Otero, artist
- 2 December
  - Hugáceo Crujiente, drag performer
  - Ana Peleteiro, athlete
- 15 December
  - Alberto Abalde, basketball player
  - Núria Mendoza, footballer
- 27 December – Carlos Cuevas, actor

== Deaths ==
- 1 January – Miquel Tarradell, archaeologist and historian (born 1920)
- 6 January – Agustín Gaínza, footballer (born 1922)
- 23 January – Gregorio Ordóñez, politician (born 1958)
- 6 February – Maruja Mallo, painter (born 1902)
- 10 February – Jesús Garay, footballer (born 1930)
- 1 March – César Rodríguez, footballer (born 1920)
- 7 March – Alfredo de Zavala y Lafora, lawyer and minister (born 1893)
- 10 March – Ovidi Montllor, performer (born 1942)
- 11 March – María Rosa Salgado, actress (born 1929)
- 17 March – José María Forqué, screenwriter and film director (born 1923)
- 28 March – Ana Mariscal, film actress and producer (born 1923)
- 3 April – Gracita Morales, actress (born 1928)
- 5 May – Juan Nuño, writer and academic (born 1927)
- 14 May – Fausto Olivares, painter (born 1940
- 16 May – Lola Flores, actress, bailaora, and singer (born 1923)
- 30 May – Antonio Flores, performer (born 1961)
- 1 July – Muelle, graffiti artist (born 1965)
- 26 July – Jaime de Mora y Aragón, aristocrat and actor (born 1925)
- 1 August – Julián Berrendero, cyclist (born 1912)
- 16 August – António Vilar, actor (born 1912 in Portugal)
- 18 August – Julio Caro Baroja, academic (born 1914)
- 22 August – José Antonio Girón, Falangist politician (born 1911)
- 8 September – Paco Campos, footballer (born 1916)
- 22 September – Julio Alejandro, screenwriter (born 1906)
- 3 October – Elena Quiroga, writer (born 1921)
- 10 October – Juan Manuel Soriano, voice actor (born 1920)
- 15 October – María del Carmen Martínez Sancho, mathematician (born 1901)
- 21 November – Rafael Farina, singer (born 1923)
- 12 December – Ángel Crespo, poet born 1926)
- 15 December – Manuel Gutiérrez Mellado, army officer and politician (born 1912)
- 23 December – Joan Sardà i Dexeus, economist (born 1910)
- 24 December – Carlos Lapetra, footballer (born 1938)

== See also ==
- 1995 in Spanish television
