= 1998 in Spain =

- Decades: 1970s; 1980s; 1990s; 2000s; 2010s
- See also: Other events of 1998; List of years in Spain

The following lists events that happened during 1998 in Spain.

== Incumbents ==
- Monarch – Juan Carlos I
- Prime Minister of Spain – José María Aznar

== Events ==
- 31 January — The 12th Goya Awards are held in Madrid and Lucky Star is awarded as best film.
- 16 April – L'Hemisfèric is inaugurated in Valencia's City of Arts and Sciences.
- 25 April — A holding dam bursts in the Province of Seville, releasing 4–5 million cubic metres of mine tailings causing the Doñana disaster.
- 30 May — Caesium-137 leaked from an Acerinox plant in Los Barrios, causing radioactive contamination in the Acerinox accident.
- 25 September — PauknAir Flight 4101 crashes on a flight from Málaga to Melilla. All 38 passengers and crew perish.
- 25 October — The Basque regional election is held, creating the 6th Basque Parliament.

== Births ==
=== January ===
- 1 January
  - Marta García, runner
  - Asier Gomes
- 2 January – Manu García, footballer
- 5 January — Carles Aleñá, footballer
- 6 January
  - Héctor Santos, athlete
  - Iñigo Vicente, footballer
- 11 January – África Zamorano, swimmer
- 13 January – Manu Quijera, javelin thrower
- 18 January – Aitana Bonmatí, footballer
- 21 January
  - Fran Álvarez Rodríguez, footballer
  - Salva Ferrer, footballer
- 24 January – Garazi Murua, footballer
- 25 January – Álex Martín, footballer
- 26 January
  - Gonzalo "Pipa" Ávila, footballer
  - Manu Mosquera, footballer
- 28 January – Alejandro Sotillos, footballer
- 29 January
  - Nico Campuzano, footballer
  - Álex Rey, footballer
- 31 January – Aritz Arambarri, footballer

=== February ===
- 3 February – Fran Navarro, footballer
- 4 February — Álvaro Bravo, footballer
- 5 February – Dani Morer, footballer
- 9 February – Relu, footballer
- 10 February
  - Juanma Bravo, footballer
  - Aitor Buñuel, footballer
  - Julio Gracia, footballer
- 13 February – Guillem Rodríguez, footballer
- 16 February – Carles Pérez, footballer
- 19 February – Damià Viader, footballer
- 22 February – Pablo Martínez, footballer
- 23 February – Felipe Chacartegui, footballer
- 25 February – Oriol Rey, footballer
- 26 February — Josemi Castañeda, footballer

=== March ===
- 2 March — Kike Carrasco, footballer
- 4 March – Ricard Pujol, footballer
- 6 March – Iñigo Elosegui, cyclist
- 7 March – Antonio Otegui, footballer
- 10 March – Claudia Florentino, footballer
- 11 March – Miguel Ángel, footballer
- 16 March — Miguel Acosta Mateos, footballer
- 18 March – Jaime Sierra, footballer
- 20 March
  - Jorge Chanza, footballer
  - Joel Plata, gymnast
- 21 March – Cristian Rivero, footballer
- 23 March
  - Genaro Rodríguez, footballer
  - Gonzalo Villar, footballer
- 24 March – Dani Escriche, footballer
- 25 March – Maite Oroz, footballer
- 29 March — Manu Nieto, footballer
- 30 March – Nacho Méndez, footballer
- 31 March – Toni Segura, footballer

=== April ===
- 2 April — Berto González, footballer
- 7 April – Paula Crespí, water polo player
- 9 April — José María Amo, footballer
- 10 April
  - Pep Chavarría, footballer
  - Rubén Enri, footballer
- 13 April – Álvaro Fernández, footballer
- 14 April – Carmen Menayo, footballer
- 17 April
  - Eric Montes, footballer
  - Alejandro Ropero, cyclist
- 18 April —Roger Adrià, cyclist
- 21 April — Roberto Alarcón Sáez, footballer
- 27 April – Ander Egiluz, footballer
- 30 April
  - Georgina Amorós, actor
  - Carlos Isaac, footballer

=== May ===
- 2 May
  - Victor Fernández, footballer
  - Javi Hernández, footballer
- 4 May — Clara Azurmendi, badminton player
- 7 May – Dani Olmo, footballer
- 9 May – Andrea Vilaró, basketball player
- 13 May
  - Jon Moncayola, footballer
  - Adrià Pedrosa, footballer
- 15 May
  - Francisco Callejón, footballer
  - Pepe Mena, footballer
  - Eric Vila, basketball player
- 17 May – Patricia Guijarro, footballer
- 19 May
  - Mónica Alonso, rhythmic gymnast
  - Aarón Rey, footballer
- 20 May — Raúl Asencio, footballer
- 25 May – Javi Puado, footballer
- 27 May
  - Joan Cardona, sailor
  - Mourad Daoudi, footballer
  - Josep Martínez, footballer
- 28 May
  - Joel Arimany, footballer
  - Alejandro Martínez, cyclist
- 20 May – Anne Fernández de Corres, rugby

=== June ===
- 1 June — Alberto González, athlete
- 5 June – Pedro Díaz, footballer
- 6 June — Ale Llamas, footballer
- 9 June – Héctor Garzó, motorcycle racer
- 15 June — Desirée Vila Bargiela, Paralympic athlete
- 16 June – Íñigo Sainz-Maza, footballer
- 22 June – Ignacio Fontes, athlete
- 24 June – Naima García, footballer
- 27 June – Alberto Martínez, swimmer
- 28 June – Óscar Rodríguez, footballer

=== July ===
- 1 July – Ariadna Edo Beltrán, Paralympic swimmer
- 3 July – Juan Iglesias, footballer
- 7 July – Manuel Guijarro, runner
- 8 July
  - Jordan Gutiérrez, footballer
  - Dani Martín, footballer
- 9 July – Pelayo Suárez, footballer
- 14 July – Lucía García, footballer
- 15 July — Ane Azkona, footballer
- 19 July – Manu Hernando, footballer
- 22 July – Marc Cucurella, footballer
- 29 July – Irina Uribe, footballer
- 30 July – Dani Gómez, footballer

=== August ===
- 1 August — Javi Alonso, footballer
- 4 August
  - Adrián Ben, runner
  - Iker Unzueta, footballer
- 11 August – Pepelu, footballer
- 13 August – Manuel Ferriol, footballer
- 14 August – Kellyan, footballer
- 17 August – Iván Barbero, footballer
- 19 August
  - Sandra Alonso, cyclist
  - Paolo Fernandes, footballer

=== September ===
- 3 September – Joni Montiel, footballer
- 5 September — Laura Corbacho, actor and drag queen
- 10 September – Jairo Bueno, footballer
- 13 September – Eukene Larrarte, cyclist
- 15 September – Jon Morcillo, footballer
- 20 September – Pablo Ibáñez, footballer
- 21 September
  - Óscar Casas, actor
  - Kiko Pomares, footballer
- 28 September – Carlos Heredia, footballer

=== October ===
- 2 October – Christian Manrique, footballer
- 4 October — Javier Belman, footballer
- 8 October – Álvaro Granados, water polo player
- 9 October – Unai Veiga, footballer
- 19 October – María de Valdés, swimmer
- 20 October – Rubén García, footballer
- 22 October — Óscar Arribas, footballer
- 25 October – Peru Nolaskoain, footballer
- 28 October – Diego Conde, footballer
- 29 October
  - Jorge Gonzalez, footballer
  - Rafa Mújica, footballer

=== November ===
- 4 November – Achraf Hakimi, footballer
- 13 November – Iñigo Llopis Sanz, Paralympic swimmer
- 19 November – Sergi Puig, footballer
- 20 November – Dani Plomer, footballer
- 23 November – Jorge Martín, gymnast

=== December ===
- 10 December
  - Pepe Castaño, footballer
  - Manuel Peñalver, cyclist
- 11 December – Álex Bermejo, footballer
- 14 December — Julio Alonso, footballer
- 16 December — Álex Blanco, footballer

== Deaths ==
- 12 January – Ramón Sampedro, writer (born 1943)
- 4 February – Cristóbal Martínez-Bordiú, 10th Marquis of Villaverde, aristocrat (born 1922)
- 16 February — Fernando Abril Martorell, politician (born 1936)
- 22 February – José María de Areilza, Count of Motrico, politician (born 1909)
- 13 March — Pere Alberch, biologist (born 1954)
- 7 April – Luis Díez del Corral, jurist and political scientist (born 1911)
- 6 May — Juan Antonio García Díez, politician and Deputy Prime Minister of Spain (born 1940)
- 24 May – Lucio Muñoz, painter (born 1929)
- 29 June — Carmen Llorca, historian and politician (born 1921)
- 5 July – Maria Mercè Marçal, writer and professor (born 1952)
- 8 July — Lilí Álvarez, athlete, feminist, and writer (born 1905 in Italy)
- 22 July – Antonio Saura, artist (born 1930)
- 12 August — Jesús Loroño, cyclist (born 1926)
- 24 August – Manuel Azcárate, journalist and politician (born 1916)
- 25 October – Juan Tusquets Terrats, priest and author (born 1901)
- 31 October — María de la Purísima Salvat Romero, religious sister and canonised saint (born 1926)
- 15 November – Federico Krutwig, writer and politician (born 1921)
- 27 November — Gloria Fuertes, poet (born 1917)
- 29 November – Fermín Sanz-Orrio, politician (born 1901)
- 30 December — Joan Brossa, writer and artist (born 1919)
