= 1996 in Spain =

- Decades: 1970s; 1980s; 1990s; 2000s; 2010s
- See also: History of Spain; Timeline of Spanish history; List of years in Spain

Events in the year 1996 in Spain

== Incumbents ==
- Monarch – Juan Carlos I
- Prime Minister of Spain – Felipe González until 5 May, then José María Aznar

== Events ==
- March 3 – 1996 Spanish general election
- March 6 — Conservative José María Aznar becomes prime minister.
- June 2 – 1996 Spanish Grand Prix

== Births ==
- January 21 - Marco Asensio, footballer
- February 19 - Mabel (singer), a R&B and Pop Singer
- September 21 - Jesús de Miguel, footballer (d. 2026)

== Deaths ==
- January 8 - Carmen Conde, a Spanish poet
- February 5 – Antonio Ruiz Soler, a Spanish flamenco dancer and choreographer
- February 14 - Alejandro de la Sota (architect), an architect
- February 14 - Francisco Tomás y Valiente, a Spanish jurist
- February 19 – Antonio Creus, a race car driver.
- March 2 – José López Rubio, a film director
- March 18 -- Enrique Jordá, Spanish-American conductor
- March 18 - Maria Teresa Pelegrí i Marimón, a Spanish composer
- April 2 – Antonio Ortiz Ramírez, an anarcho-syndicalist and anarchist
- April 23 – Jesús Hernández Úbeda, a professional bicycle racer
- April 24 - Rafael Orozco (pianist), a pianist
- May 2 - María Luisa Ponte, an actress
- May 4 – Eduardo Franco Raymundo, a chess player
- May 8 – Luis Miguel Dominguín, a bullfighter (died due to cerebral hemorrhage)
- May 24 – José Cuatrecasas - Spanish-American pharmacist and botanist
- June 2 --Pilar Lorengar, an opera singer
- June 6 – José María Valverde, a philosopher
- June 9 – Rafaela Aparicio, an actress (died due to cerebral hemorrhage)
- June 23 – Mariano Rojas, Spanish bicycle racer
- June 30 – Antonio Franco Florensa, Spanish football player
- July 9 - Aurora Redondo, an actress
- July 18 - José Manuel Fuente, Spanish road racing cyclist
- July 24 - Nacho Martínez, an actor
- August 6 - Emilio Zapico, racing driver
- September 13 – Xosé Filgueira Valverde, a writer, intellectual, and researcher
- October 26 – Miquel Asins Arbó, a composer
- November 5 – Joaquín Monserrat, a Spanish comedian as well as a host of children programmes
- November 19 – Gabriel Alonso, a football player
- November 22 – María Casares, a Spanish-French actress
- November 25 - Ricardo Lopez Aranda, a Spanish playwright
- December 16 – Dolores Medio, a Spanish writer
- December 23 – Vicente González Lizondo, a Spanish politician - died due to a heart attack
- December 23 – Infanta María Cristina of Spain, a Spanish princess - died due to a heart attack
- December 26 – Narcís Jubany Arnau, a Spanish catholic cardinal
- December 27 - Julián Mateos. a Spanish actor and film producer
