= 1999 in Spanish television =

This is a list of Spanish television related events in 1999.

== Events ==
- 27 January: TV channel CNN+ starts broadcasting.
- 14 February: TV channel Real Madrid TV starts broadcasting.
- 1 March: TV channel Comedy Central is launched.
- 27 March: TV channel Nickelodeon starts broadcasting.
- 30 March: Paolo Vasile relieves Maurizio Carlotti as ceo of Telecinco.
- 21 August: Canary Islands Regional Channel Televisión Canaria is launched.
- 15 September: TV channel Calle 13 starts broadcasting.

== Debuts ==
Title	Channel	Debut	Performers/Host	Genre
7 vidas	Telecinco	1999-01-17	Amparo Baró	Sitcom
50x15: ¿Quién quiere ser millonario?	Telecinco	1999-04-17	Carlos Sobera	Quiz Show
A toda risa	TVE-1	1999-11-29	María Abradelo	Quiz Show
Ada Madrina	Antena 3	1999-01-06	Carmen Sevilla	Sitcom
Alerta 112	Antena 3	1999-03-28	Esther Malagón	News Magazine
Araucaria	La 2	1999-07-11		Documentary
Camino de Santiago	Antena 3	1999-12-04	Anthony Quinn	Miniseries
Como la vida	Antena 3	1999-09-13	Alicia Senovilla	Variety Show
Concierto básico	Canal +	1999-03-06		Music
Condenadas a entenderse	Antena 3	1999-09-19	Anabel Alonso	Sitcom
Cosas que importan	TVE-1	1999-10-05	Jaume Barberà	Variety Show
Cristina, amiga mía	Antena 3	1999-04-05	Cristina Tárrega	Late night
Cuánto cuesta	TVE-1	1999-04-26	Nuria Roca	Science/Culture
Curso del 99	TVE-1	1999-04-07	José Manuel Parada	Variety Show
Desesperado Club Social	Antena 3	1999-09-25	Christian Gálvez	Children
El club de la comedia	Canal +	1999-09-26	Javier Veiga	Comedy
El comisario	Telecinco	1999-04-26	Tito Valverde	Drama Series
El cronómetro	Antena 3	1999-09-13	Concha Galán	Variety Show
El gran concurso del siglo	TVE-1	1999-10-08	Ramón García	Game Show
El juego de las lunas	Canal +	1999-04-10		Quiz Show
El secreto de la porcelana	TVE-1	1999-12-29	Nacho Duato	Miniseries
El tiempo pasa, corazón	Antena 3	1999-11-27	Marta Robles	Variety Show
El último verano	Telecinco	1999-07-04	Yohana Cobo	Miniseries
Ellas son así	Telecinco	1999-01-14	Maribel Verdú	Sitcom
En clave actual	TVE-1	1999-06-01	Lorenzo Milá	Documentary
Escuela del deporte	La 2	1999-10-23	Jordi Pons	Sport
Estamos en directo	TVE-1	1999-10-29	Cruz y Raya	Comedy
Esto me suena	Antena 3	1999-07-17	Rody Aragón	Quiz Show
Famosos y familia	TVE-1	1999-09-16	Carmen Maura	Sitcom
Fiebre del domingo noche	Telecinco	1999-07-18	Carolina Ferre	Music
Flash, el juego de las noticias	Telecinco	1999-05-03	Juan Manuel López Iturriaga	Quiz Show
Fútbol de Primera	TVE-1	1999-03-03		Sport
Generación +	Canal +	1999-08-25	Andrés Montes	Sport
Hora punta	TVE-1	1999-07-21	Ramón Langa	Videos
In fraganti	TVE-1	1999-09-05	Paz Padilla	Comedy
La Gran ilusión	Telecinco	1999-11-20	Concha García Campoy	Movies
La Trituradora	Antena 3	1999-05-17	Belinda Washington	Quiz Show
La vuelta al mando	Antena 3	1999-09-28	Alexis Valdés	Late night
Las mañanas de Rosa	Antena 3	1999-01-18	Rosa Villacastín	Variety Show
Los comunes	Antena 3	1999-04-20	Jesús Hermida	Talk Show
Los libros	La 2	1999-01-27	Eduardo Sotillos	Science/Culture
Me lo dijo Pérez	Telecinco	1999-01-17	José Corbacho	Comedy
Mediterráneo	Telecinco	1999-01-26	Josema Yuste	Sitcom
Mírame	Antena 3	1999-04-17	Silvia Jato	Videos
Nada es para siempre	Antena 3	1999-07-05	Carlos Castel	Soap Opera
Noche de fiesta	TVE-1	1999-04-10	Carlos Lozano	Variety Show
Nosolomúsica	Telecinco	1999-03-14	Carla Hidalgo	Variety Show
Para toda la vida	Antena 3	1999-09-24	Pedro Rollán	Dating show
Petra Delicado	Telecinco	1999-09-09	Ana Belén	Drama Series
Pim, pam, plus	Canal +	1999-01-16		Children
Póker de damas	Antena 3	1999-06-01	Cristina Tárrega	Variety Show
Por la escuadra	Antena 3	1999-09-20	Carlos García Hirschfeld	Sport
Puerta con puerta	TVE-1	1999-07-06	Sancho Gracia	Sitcom
Qué grande es el teatro	La 2	1999-02-13		Theatre
¡Qué punto!	Telecinco	1999-07-26	Ana García Lozano	Variety Show
¿Quién con quién?	TVE-1	1999-07-19	Jaime Bores	Quiz Show
Sabor a verano	Antena 3	1999-07-19	Inés Ballester	Variety Show
SOS Ciudadano	Telecinco	1999-04-17	María José Sáez	Public Service
Todo en familia	TVE-1	1999-02-12	Ramón García	Quiz Show
Tomates y pimientos	Antena 3	1999-04-12	Mayra Gómez Kemp	Cooking Show
TPH Club	TVE-1	1999-09-13		Children
Trilocos	La 2	1999-09-29	Fofito	Children
Trato hecho	Antena 3	1999-02-06	Bertín Osborne	Game Show
Un país maravilloso	Antena 3	1999-01-21	Anabel Alonso	Quiz Show
Ver para creer	Antena 3	1999-03-24	Inés Ballester	Videos
Verano, verano	TVE-1	1999-07-29	Yolanda Valencia	Music
Vértigo	TVE-1	1999-10-13	Antonio Resines	Variety Show
Vidas paralelas	TVE-1	1999-04-15		Docudrama
Vive el verano	Antena 3	1999-07-18	Pedro Rollán	Variety Show
Xat TV	La 2	1999-09-08	Albert Espinosa	Youth
Zap...Zap...Zapping	Canal +	1999-02-06		Videos

== Television shows ==
- La 1
  - Telediario (1957- )
  - Estudio estadio (1972-2005)
  - Informe Semanal (1973- )
  - Parlamento (1978-2014)
  - Barrio Sésamo (1979-2000)
  - Telepasión española (1990- )
  - ¿Qué apostamos? (1993-2000)
  - Corazón, Corazón (1993-2010)
  - Cartelera (1994-2009)
  - Los Desayunos de TVE (1994-2020)
  - Cine de barrio (1995- )
  - Mitomanía (1995-2001)
  - El Grand Prix del verano (1995-2005)
  - Gente (1995-2011)
  - Corazón (1997- )
  - Calle nueva (1997-2000)
  - Música sí (1997-2004)
  - Saber vivir (1997-2009)
  - Peque Prix (1998-2000)
- La 2
  - Al filo de lo imposble (1982- )
  - Pueblo de Dios (1982- )
  - Últimas preguntas (1983- )
  - En portada (1984- )
  - Estadio 2 (1984-2007)
  - Metrópolis (1985- )
  - Documentos TV (1986- )
  - Tendido cero (1986- )
  - Días de cine (1991- )
  - Línea 900 (1991-2007)
  - La Aventura del saber (1992- )
  - Jara y sedal (1992- )
  - Zona ACB (1993-2010)
  - Bricomanía (1994-2004)
  - La 2 noticias (1994-2020)
  - La noche temática, (1995- )
  - Un País en la mochila (1995-2000)
  - ¡Qué grande es el cine! (1995-2005)
  - Empléate a fondo (1996-2000)
  - Redes (1996-2013)
  - Agrosfera (1997- )
  - El escarabajo verde (1997- )
  - Saber y ganar (1997- )
  - Quatro (1997-2000)
  - América total (1997-2004)
  - A su salud (1997-2004)
  - Negro sobre blanco (1997-2004)
  - Noche abierta, La (1997-2004)
  - El Tercer grado (1997-2004)
  - La Botica de la abuela (1997-2006)
  - En otras palabras (1997-2008)
  - La Mandrágora (1997-2009)
  - El Cine de La 2 (1998- )
  - Versión española (1998- )
  - Lo tuyo es puro teatro (1998-2000)
  - Al habla (1998-2004)
- Antena 3
  - Antena 3 Noticias (1990- )
  - Telemaratón (1993-2001)
  - En buenas manos (1994-2005)
  - Lluvia de estrellas (1995-2001)
  - Club Megatrix (1995-2013)
  - Espejo público (1996- )
  - La casa de los líos (1996-2000)
  - La Parodia nacional (1996-2001)
  - Menudas estrellas (1996-2002)
  - El Primer café (1996-2003)
  - Alta tensión (1998-2000)
  - Nada es para siempre (1998-2000)
  - Furor (1998-2001)
  - Manos a la obra (1998-2001)
  - Compañeros (1998-2002)
  - Sabor a ti (1998-2004)
  - Noche de impacto (1998-2005)
- Telecinco
  - Informativos Telecinco (1990- )
  - Día a día (1996-2004)
  - Caiga quien caiga (1996-2008)
  - Moros y cristianos (1997-2001)
  - Al salir de clase (1997-2002)
  - Crónicas marcianas (1997-2005)
  - Club Disney (1998-2000)
  - El Juego del euromillón (1998-2001)
  - El Informal (1998-2002)
  - Periodistas (1998-2002)
  - La Mirada crítica (1998-2009)
- Canal+
  - El día después (1990-2005)
  - Redacción (1990-2005)
  - Lo + plus (1995-2005)
  - Las noticias del guiñol (1995-2005)
  - Magacine (1996-2005)

== Ending this year ==
- La 1
  - Testigo directo (1994-1999)
  - El Semáforo (1995-1999)
  - Mucha marcha (1996-1999)
  - Digan lo que digan (1997-1999)
  - Risas y estrellas (1997-1999)
  - A las once en casa (1998-1999)
  - El Séptimo de caballería (1998-1999)
  - Tío Willy (1998-1999)
  - Una de dos (1998-1999)
- Antena 3
  - Lo que necesitas es amor (1993-1999)
  - Sorpresa, ¡Sorpresa! (1996-1999)
  - Arévalo y cía (1997-1999)
  - El Kanguro de A3Z (1997-1999)
- Telecinco
  - Médico de familia (1995-1999)
  - Ana (1996-1999)
  - El Súper (1996-1999)
  - Más que amigos (1997-1999)
  - Un Millán de cosas (1998-1999)
  - Tardes con Alicia (1998-1999)
- Canal +
  - Programa más o menos multiplicado o dividido (1996-1999)

== Foreign series debuts in Spain ==
English title	Spanish title	Original title	Channel	Country	Performers
Ally McBeal	Ally McBeal		Telecinco	USA	Calista Flockhart
American Gothic	La mirada del mal		La 1	USA	Gary Cole
Baywatch Nights	Los vigilantes de la noche		Antena 3	USA	David Hasselhoff
Beast Wars: Transformers	Beast Wars		Telecinco	CAN	
Chicago Sons	Chicago sons		FORTA	USA	Jason Bateman
Clueless	Fuera de onda		Telecinco	USA	Rachel Blanchard
---	Cosas del amor	Cosas del amor	La 1	PER	Maricarmen Regueiro
Early Edition	Edición anterior		Canal +	USA	Kyle Chandler
Felicity	Felicity		Telecinco	USA	Keri Russell
First Wave	El elegido		FORTA	CAN	Sebastian Spence
Honey, I Shrunk the Kids	Cariño, he encogido a los niños		La 1	USA	Peter Scolari
Hudson Street	Hudson Street		FORTA	USA	Tony Danza
---	Isabella, mujer enamorada		La 1	USA	Ana Colchero
---	La usurpadora	La usurpadora	La 1	MEX	Gabriela Spanic
Martial Law	Martial Law		Antena 3	USA	Sammo Hung
Michael Hayes	Michael Hayes		Canal +	USA	David Caruso
Mr. & Mrs. Smith	Los Smith		Telecinco	USA	Scott Bakula, Maria Bello
Oh Baby	Oh Baby		Canal +	USA	Cynthia Stevenson
Pokémon	Pokemon	Poketto Monsutā	Telecinco	JAP	
Police Academy: The Series	Loca academia de policía		Canal +	USA	Matt Borlenghi
Power Play	El juego del poder		Telecinco	CAN	Michael Riley
...	Primer amor	Primer amor	Telecinco	ARG	Grecia Colmenares
Profit	Juego sucio		Telecinco	USA	Adrian Pasdar
Roar	Connor, el rugido		La 1	USA	Heath Ledger
---	Rosalinda		La 1	MEX	Thalía, Fernando Carrillo
Sally the Witch	Sally, la maga	Mahōtsukai Sarī	Antena 3	JAP	
Savannah	Savanah		La 2	USA	Jamie Luner
Stargate SG-1	Stargate		FORTA	USA	Richard Dean Anderson
Student Bodies	Reporteros con clase		La 1	CAN	Jamie Elman
Suddenly Susan	De repente, Susan		Canal +	USA	Brooke Shields
Team Knight Rider	El Equipo Fantástico		La 1	USA	Brixton Karnes
The Busy World of Richard Scarry	El Mundo Fantástico De Richard Scarry		Antena 3	USA CAN	
The Closer	Cierra el trato		Canal +	USA	Tom Selleck
The Legend of William Tell	Guillermo Tell		La 2	NZL	Kieren Hutchison
The New Addams Family	La nueva Familia Addams		La 1	USA	Glenn Taranto
Two of a Kind	Cosas de gemelas		Antena 3	USA	Mary-Kate and Ashley Olsen
V.I.P.	V.I.P.		Antena 3	USA	Pamela Anderson

== Births ==
- 19 November - Denisse Peña, actress.

== Deaths ==
- 2 January - Margot Cottens, actress, 76.
- 8 February - Luis Sánchez Polack, humourist, 72.
- 7 April - Nuria Carresi, actress, 58.
- 18 April - Vicente Escrivá, director and screenwriter, 85.
- 14 May - Francisco Eguiagaray, journalist, 65.
- 6 November - José María Caffarel, actor, 79.

== See also ==
- 1999 in Spain
- List of Spanish films of 1999
