= 1917 in Spain =

- Decades: 1890s; 1900s; 1910s; 1920s; 1930s
- See also: History of Spain; Timeline of Spanish history; List of years in Spain

Events in the year 1917 in Spain.

== Incumbents ==
- Monarch: Alfonso XIII
- President of the Council of Ministers:
  - until 19 April: Álvaro Figueroa Torres
  - 19 April – 11 June: Manuel García Prieto
  - 11 June – 3 November: Eduardo Dato Iradier
  - starting 3 November: Manuel García Prieto

== Events ==
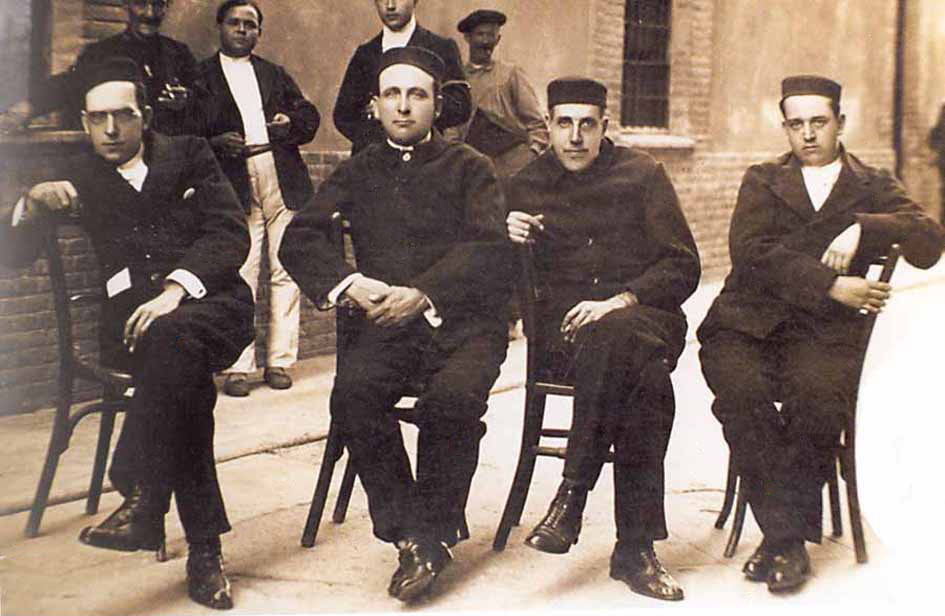
Daniel Anguiano, Francisco Largo Caballero, Julián Besteiro and Andrés Saborit, leaders of the general strike, photographed in the prison of Cartagena

- 18 January – "Manifiesto de la Liga Antigermanófila" ('Manifesto of the Anti-Germanophile League') published in La España.
- 25 June – the Juntas de Defensa made their manifesto public.
- 13 August – Beginning of the 1917 general strike.
- 11 November 1917 – Municipal elections.

=== Undated ===
- Spanish crisis of 1917

== Births ==
- 23 January – Encarna Hernández, basketball player and coach (died 2022).
- 1 February – José Luis Sampedro, economist and human rights activist (died 2013).
- 20 April – María Silva Cruz, "La Libertaria", anarchist known for the 1933 Casas Viejas uprising (died 1936).
- 21 April – María Isbert, actress (died 2011).
- 1 July – Álvaro Domecq y Díez, aristocrat (died 2005).
- 4 July – Manolete, bullfighter (died 1947).
- 6 July – Heribert Barrera, Catalan nationalist politician (died 2011).
- 28 July – Gloria Fuertes, writer of children's literature (died 1998).
- 20 September – Fernando Rey, film, tv and theatre actor (died 1994).
- 25 December – Alejandro Rodríguez de Valcárcel, falangist politician, acting head of state in November 1975 (died 1976).

== Deaths ==
- 21 February – Joaquín Dicenta, journalist, novelist, playwright, poet and Republican politician (born 1862).
- 1 August – Enric Prat de la Riba, Catalan nationalist, lawyer and writer (born 1870).
- 18 August – Ricardo de Madrazo, painter best known for his Orientalist works (born 1852).
- 15 December – Gumersindo de Azcárate, Krausist educator, philosopher and Republican politician (born 1840).
- 22 December – Pío Gullón e Iglesias, lawyer, journalist and politician (born 1835).
