= 1918 in Spain =

- Decades: 1890s; 1900s; 1910s; 1920s; 1930s
- See also: Other events of 1918; List of years in Spain

Events in the year 1918 in Spain.

== Incumbents ==
- Monarch: Alfonso XIII
- President of the Council of Ministers:
  - until 22 March: Manuel García-Prieto, Marquis of Alhucemas
  - 22 March-9 November: Antonio Maura
  - 9 November-5 December: Manuel García-Prieto, Marquis of Alhucemas
  - starting 5 December: Álvaro de Figueroa, Count of Romanones

== Births ==
- January 19 - José Costas Gual, astronomer. (died 2011)
- February 8 - Enrique Tierno Galván, politician. (died 1986)
- March 4 - José María Larrauri Lafuente, bishop. (died 2008)
- November 17 - Ángeles Flórez Peón, activist and writer. (died 2024)

== Deaths ==
- José Ferrándiz y Niño. (born 1847)
