= 1913 in Spain =

- Decades: 1890s; 1900s; 1910s; 1920s; 1930s
- See also: History of Spain; Timeline of Spanish history; List of years in Spain

Events in the year 1913 in Spain.

== Incumbents ==
- Monarch: Alfonso XIII
- President of the Government: Álvaro Figueroa Torres (until 27 October), Eduardo Dato (starting 27 October)

== Births ==
- July 1 - Joana Raspall i Juanola, writer and librarian (died 2013)
- July 8 - Alejandra Soler, politician and schoolteacher (died 2017)

== Deaths ==
- October 29 - Darío de Regoyos. (born 1857)
