= 1999 in Spain =

- Decades: 1970s; 1980s; 1990s; 2000s; 2010s
- See also: Other events of 1999; List of years in Spain

Events in the year 1999 in Spain.

== Incumbents ==
- Monarch – Juan Carlos I
- Prime Minister of Spain – José María Aznar

=== Regional presidents ===
- Andalusia: Manuel Chaves
- Aragón: Santiago Lanzuela (until 2 August), Marcelino Iglesias (starting 2 August)
- Asturias: Sergio Marqués Fernández (until 20 July), Vicente Álvarez Areces (starting 20 July)
- Balearic Islands: Jaume Matas (until 29 June), Francesc Antich (starting 29 June)
- Basque Country: José Antonio Ardanza (until 2 January), Juan José Ibarretxe (starting 2 January)
- Canary Islands: Manuel Hermoso (until 17 July), Román Rodríguez Rodríguez (starting 17 July)
- Cantabria: José Joaquín Martínez Sieso
- Castilla–La Mancha: José Bono
- Castile and León: Juan José Lucas
- Catalonia: Jordi Pujol
- Extremadura: Juan Carlos Rodríguez Ibarra
- Galicia: Manuel Fraga
- La Rioja: Pedro Sanz
- Community of Madrid: Alberto Ruiz-Gallardón
- Region of Murcia: Ramón Luis Valcárcel
- Navarre: Miguel Sanz
- Valencian Community: Eduardo Zaplana
- Ceuta: Jesús Cayetano Fortes Ramos (until 26 August), Antonio Sampietro (starting 26 August)
- Melilla: Enrique Palacios Hernández (until 5 July), Mustafa Aberchán (starting 5 July)

== Events ==
- 1 January - The Euro Currency officially entered circulation in the European Union (EU) Eurozone member area countries, then formally made its debut on European and the worldwide financial markets.
- 14 September - Britannia Airways Flight 226A, a charter flight from Cardiff, crashes at Girona Airport, resulting in one death and 43 injuries.
- 9 October - Beginning of the Wanninkhof case: Rocío Wanninkhof leaves home never to return; her body is found several weeks later.

=== Undated ===
- Virtway game development studio is founded in Oviedo.
- Web Medica Acreditada, an international website quality and certification programme

== Popular culture ==
=== Music ===
- See Category:1999 in Spanish music

=== Film ===
- See Category:1999 in Spanish cinema

=== Television ===
- See Category:1999 in Spanish television

=== Sport ===
- See Category:1999 in Spanish sport

== Notable births ==
- 19 February - Hugo Gonzalez, swimmer
- 3 August - Brahim Díaz, footballer
- 13 September - Pedro Porro, footballer

== Notable deaths ==
- 27 January – Gonzalo Torrente Ballester, writer (b. 1910)
- 20 April – Señor Wences, ventriloquist and comedian (b. 1896)
- 6 July – Joaquín Rodrigo, pianist and composer (b. 1901)
- 10 September – Alfredo Kraus, operatic tenor (b. 1927)
- 28 October – Rafael Alberti, poet (b. 1902)
- 17 November – Enrique Urquijo, singer-songwriter (b. 1960; drug overdose)

== See also ==
- 1999 in Spanish television
- List of Spanish films of 1999
