= Espasa-Calpe =

Spanish publisher

- Parent company: Casa del Libro
- Status: Defunct
- Founded: 1925
- Founders: Nicolás María de Urgoiti; José Espasa Anguera; Pau Espasa i Anguera
- Successor: Grupo Planeta
- Country of origin: Spain
- Headquarters location: Buenos Aires; Chile; Uruguay; Peru; Mexico; Cuba
- Owner: Papelera Española

Espasa-Calpe was a Spanish publisher house which existed during the 20th century. It was created in 1925, by the union of Editorial Calpe, founded by Nicolás María de Urgoiti in 1918, and Editorial Espasa, founded by José and Pau Espasa i Anguera in 1860. The new house, named Espasa-Calpe, was owned by the paper manufacturing company Papelera Española and it became one of the most important publishers in Spain. Espasa-Calpe opened a major bookstore, Casa del Libro, in the center of Madrid. In addition, it established a headquarters in Buenos Aires, and it expanded its market to Chile, Uruguay, Peru, Mexico and Cuba. In 1991, Espasa-Calpe was acquired by Grupo Planeta, which paid 15.000 million Spanish pesetas.

== Publications ==
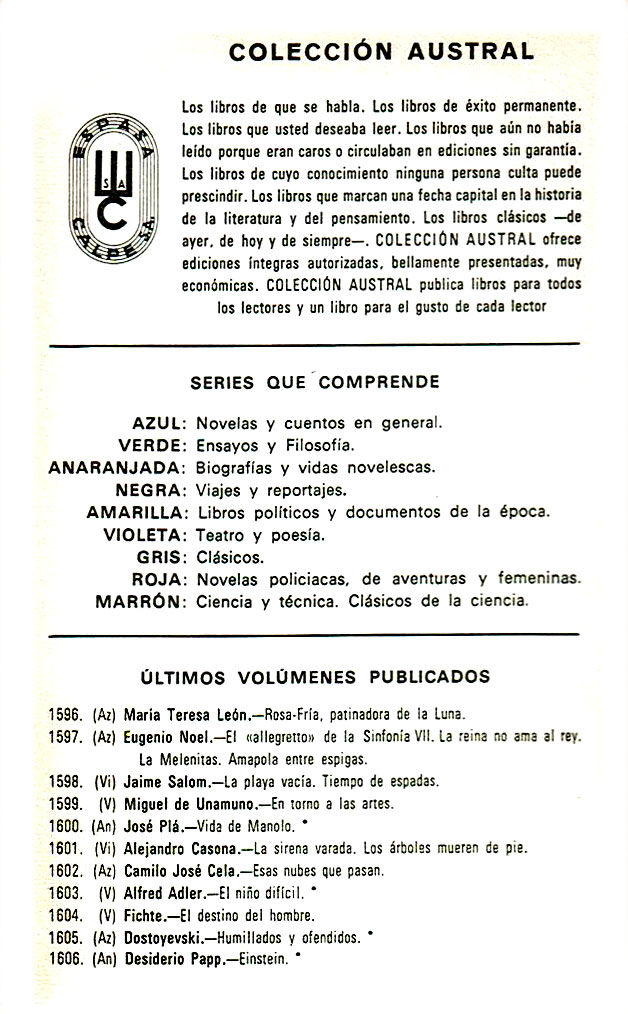
Promotional back cover of Austral collection's books detailing the colours of its series.

The main objective of the merger between the two companies was to overcome their financial difficulties in order to resume the editing of the Enciclopedia Universal Ilustrada Europeo-Americana («Universal Illustrated European-American Encyclopedia»). As a result of these efforts, this monumental project (better known as Enciclopedia Espasa, or Enciclopedia Espasa-Calpe) was completed in 1930 with the publication of its seventieth and final volume.

Since its founding, Espasa-Calpe was in charge of printing the handbooks and reference works of the Real Academia Española de la Lengua (Royal Spanish Academy); the first of these was the Diccionario Manual Ilustrado de la Lengua Española, an illustrated dictionary of the Spanish language which appeared in 1926.

The Colección Universal (1919-1935), created by Espasa, had been the first collection of paperback books in Spanish; following its philosophy, the Colección Austral was launched in 1937. The thousands of titles that would eventually form this collection were originally grouped into nine series; each one corresponded to a genre and was designated by the color in which the covers were printed. Thus, narrative texts (novels and short stories) comprised the Serie Azul («Blue Series»); biographies were included in the Serie Naranja («Orange Series»); plays and poetry, in the Serie Violeta («Violet Series»). Along with these, the essays of the Serie Verde («Green Series») and the classic works of the Serie Gris («Gray Series») were especially popular. On the back cover, in addition to detailing this classification, the publishing house boasted of offering "complete, authorized editions, beautifully presented, and very economical".
