= 1915 in Spain =

- Decades: 1890s; 1900s; 1910s; 1920s; 1930s
- See also: History of Spain; Timeline of Spanish history; List of years in Spain

Events in the year 1915 in Spain.

== Incumbents ==
- Monarch: Alfonso XIII
- President of the Government: Eduardo Dato (until 9 December), Álvaro Figueroa Torres (starting 9 December)

== Births ==
- March 19 – José García Hernández, politician (died 2000)
- August 8 – José Manuel Rodriguez Delgado, neuroscientist (died 2011)
- October 17 – Victor Garaygordóbil Berrizbeitia, Roman Catholic bishop (died 2018)
