= 1923 in Spain =

- Decades: 1900s; 1910s; 1920s; 1930s; 1940s
- See also: Other events of 1923; List of years in Spain

Events in the year 1923 in Spain.

== Incumbents ==
- Monarch: Alfonso XIII
- President of the Council of Ministers: Manuel García Prieto (until 15 September), Miguel Primo de Rivera (starting 15 September)

== Events ==
- 29 April – In the general election to elect members to all 409 seats in the Congress of Deputies, the Liberals take power from the Conservatives in accordance with the turno system.
- 23 August – Real Club Celta de Vigo is founded by the joining of Real Fortuna and Sporting de Vigo.
- 13 September – Miguel Primo de Rivera overthrows Spain's parliamentary government, and establishes himself as dictator.

== Births ==
- 21 January – Lola Flores, singer, dancer and actress (died 1995)
- 1 November – Victoria de los Ángeles, operatic soprano (died 2005)
- 2 November – Emilio el Moro, flamenco singer, guitarist and humorist (died 1987)
- 13 December – Antoni Tàpies, painter, sculptor and art theorist (died 2012)

== Deaths ==
- 10 August – Joaquín Sorolla, painter (born 1863)
