= José Espasa Anguera =

Spanish publisher (1840–1911)

José Espasa Anguera (1840 in La Pobla de Cérvoles (Lleida) – July 4, 1911 in Barcelona) was a Spanish publisher. He is most famous for having been the driving force behind the prestigious Enciclopedia Espasa.

Coming from a very humble rural family, and still a child, he had to move to Barcelona. There he first was a laborer in a demolition site for the walls of Barcelona. When he was 18 he accepted a job as a paper delivery boy. He was fascinated with the book trade, and learned as much as he could about it. In 1860, he risked his modest savings to establish a small subscription center, the precursor of the Espasa-Calpe publishing house. In this period (1860–77), under the trade name Espasa Hermanos (Espasa Brothers), published the Diccionari de la llengua catalana (Dictionary of the Catalan Language) by Laberinia. In 1875, the Poesias catalanas (Catalan Poems) by Federico Soler, were published, and became the most notable Catalan poetry publication of the era. Mr. Espasa went on to hire the most popular writers of the day. In 1881, he reached an agreement with his brother-in-law, Manuel Salvat to form a new company, Espasa y Compañía (Espasa and Company; 1881–97). In 1886, they left their spacious location on Aribau Street to a much larger building on Cortes Street. In 1897, Salvat left the venture, which until 1908, operated under the name “José Espasa” and then until the death of Senior Espasa as “Espasa é Hijos” (Espasa and Sons). Espasa's dream of "a Great (Spanish) Encyclopedia" took shape in 1905, first with the publication of weekly instalments, and, from 1908 onwards, in volumes. The magnitude of this enterprise eventually overwhelmed the publishing house and in 1925 they associated with Calpe; the head offices were moved to Madrid, and the direction of the company was given to José Ortega y Gasset.

Espasa's legacy lives on today as the Espasa-Calpe publishing house—a major publisher of Spanish reference books.
