= Enciclopedia universal ilustrada europeo-americana =

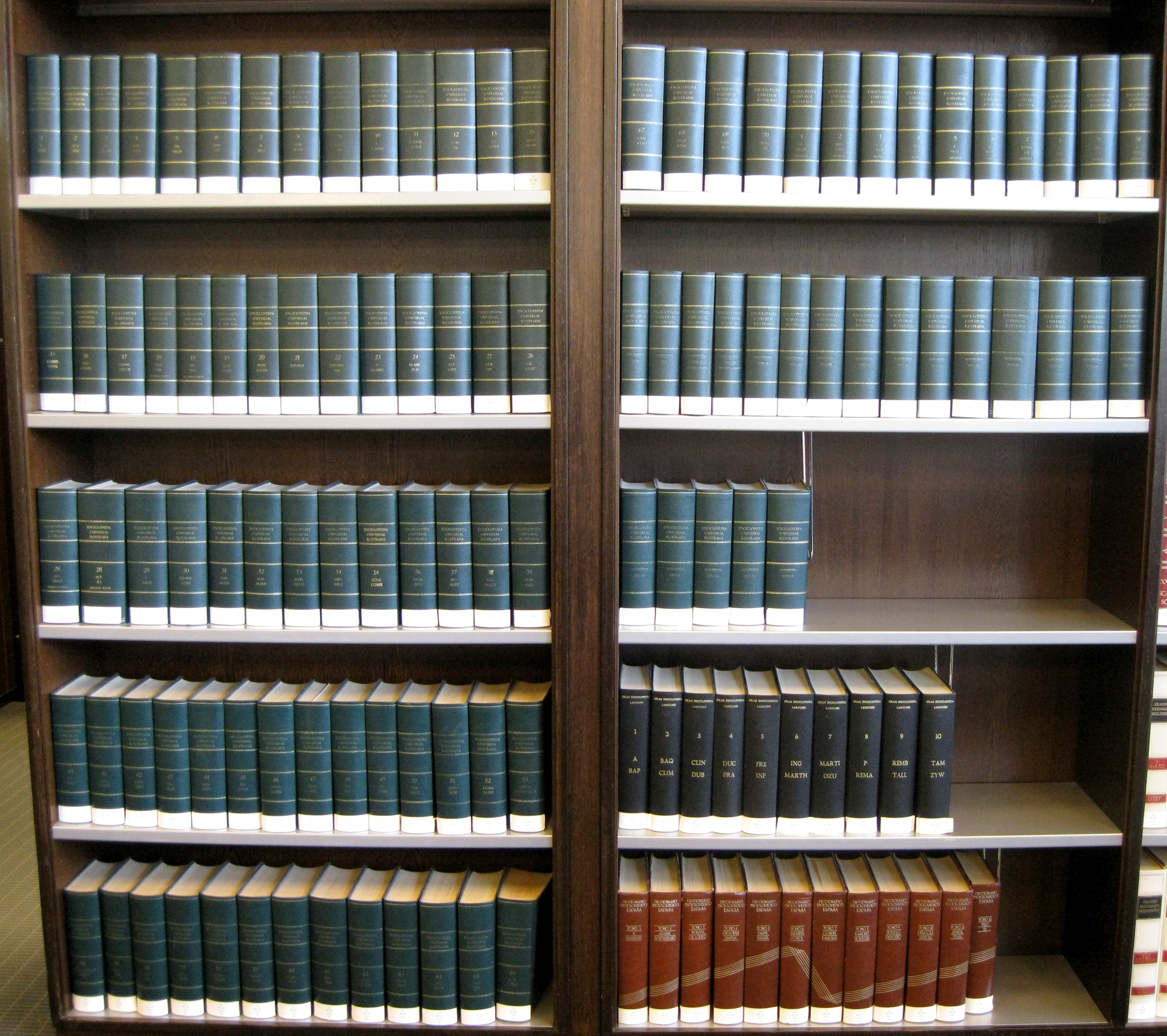
102 volumes of the encyclopedia.

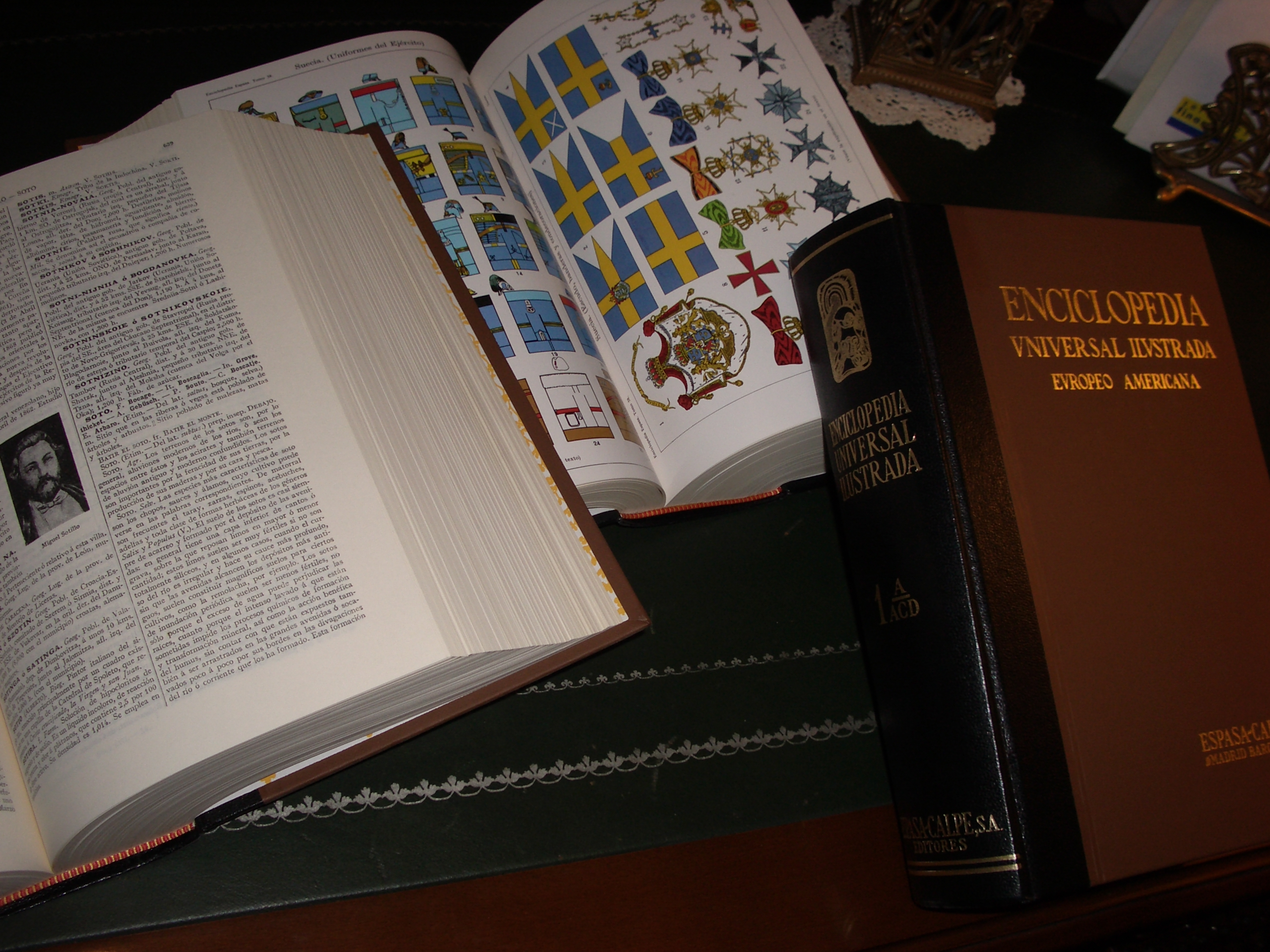
3 volumes of the encyclopedia.

The Enciclopedia universal ilustrada europeo-americana (also called Enciclopedia Espasa, or Enciclopedia Espasa-Calpe, after its publisher, founded by José Espasa Anguera) is a Spanish encyclopedia. It comprises 72 volumes (numbered from 1 to 70, with parts 18 and 28 consisting of two volumes each) published from 1908 to 1930 plus a ten-volume appendix published 1930–33. Between 1935 and 2003, 33 supplemental volumes were published plus an index, another A–Z appendix, and an atlas, for a total of 118 volumes. Each of the volumes vary in length. As of 1986, it is the longest printed encyclopedia with 105,000 pages and 165,200,000 words.

Encyclopaedias: Their History Throughout The Ages regards the Espasa as one of the greatest encyclopedias, along with the Encyclopædia Britannica Eleventh Edition and the Enciclopedia Italiana (p. 147). "This work is remarkable for its detail: maps and plans of even remote and obscure places; reproductions and descriptions of works of art entered under their titles; lengthy bibliographies, international in scope; full dictionary treatment of individual words with, in many cases, foreign equivalents; and usually affording full scope to lengthy treatment of important subjects." (201) The authors of the work, as an example of its scope, mentioned in the preface (vii) that all botanical genera known at the time were covered in the work. Common words (not proper names) are translated into English, French, German, Esperanto and other languages.

The aim of the Editorial Espasa-Calpe was to produce an encyclopedia reference book in Spanish that covered scientific and technological knowledge as well as history, biographies, geography, arts, and the literature of Spain and Latin America.

According to calculations made by its publishers, the encyclopaedia has more than 165,000 pages and 200 million words. The 82-volume version is also estimated to have over 1,000,000 articles (Kister 450).

Only minor revisions have been made to the original volumes, such as the rewrite of a part of the 1910 "bicicleta" (bicycle) article which had enumerated a "pistol or revolver" as one of the things to be taken on a bicycle tour.

In 2003 a repackaged version was published in 90 volumes, consisting of the original 82 volumes plus a new 8-volume Complemento Enciclopédico 1934–2002 update. The old supplements will not be republished.
