= 1997 in Spain =

- Decades: 1970s; 1980s; 1990s; 2000s; 2010s
- See also: Other events of 1997; List of years in Spain

Events in the year 1997 in Spain

== Incumbents ==
- Monarch – Juan Carlos I
- Prime Minister of Spain – José María Aznar

== Events ==
- 8 July – the 1997 Madrid NATO summit is held at IFEMA
- 19 October – Galician regional election

== Births ==
- 26 March – Almudena Gallardo, archer
- 5 April — Borja Mayoral, footballer
- 28 April — Marina Cordobés, water polo player
