= 1919 in Spain =

- Decades: 1890s; 1900s; 1910s; 1920s; 1930s
- See also: History of Spain; Timeline of Spanish history; List of years in Spain

Events in the year 1919 in Spain.

== Incumbents ==
- Monarch: Alfonso XIII
- President of the Council of Ministers:
  - until 15 April: Álvaro de Figueroa, 1st Count of Romanones
  - 15 April-20 July: Antonio Maura
  - 20 July-12 December: Joaquín Sánchez de Toca
  - starting 12 December: Manuel Allendesalazar y Muñoz de Salazar

== Births ==
- 17 January - Mingote, cartoonist (d. 2012)
- 20 July - María Asunción Milá, human rights activist (d. 2026)
- 3 November - Jesús Blasco, comic book author (d. 1995)

== Deaths ==
- 19 November - Florencio Constantino. (b. 1869)
- Francisco Portusach Martínez, Governor of Guam (b. 1864)
