= Felipe Chacartegui =

Spanish association football player

Personal information
- Full name: Felipe Rodríguez Chacartegui
- Date of birth: 23 February 1998 (age 28)
- Place of birth: Cádiz, Spain
- Height: 1.76 m (5 ft 9 in)
- Position: Left back

Team information
- Current team: Xerez
- Number: 3

Youth career
- Polideportivo Cádiz
- 2009–2013: Tiempo Libre
- 2013–2015: San Fernando
- 2015–2017: Sevilla

Senior career*
| Years | Team | Apps | (Gls) |
| 2014–2015 | San Fernando | 3 | (1) |
| 2015 | San Fernando B | 3 | (0) |
| 2016–2017 | Sevilla C | 6 | (0) |
| 2017–2020 | Sevilla B | 56 | (2) |
| 2020–2022 | UCAM Murcia | 47 | (0) |
| 2022–2023 | Hércules | 22 | (1) |
| 2023–2024 | Badajoz | 25 | (1) |
| 2024 | Beroe | 11 | (0) |
| 2025 | Antoniano | 8 | (0) |
| 2025– | Xerez | 24 | (2) |
- * Club domestic league appearances and goals as of 7 May 2026

Felipe Rodríguez Chacartegui (born 23 February 1998) is a Spanish professional footballer who plays for Segunda Federación club Xerez as a left back.

== Club career ==
Born in Cádiz, Andalusia, Chacartegui started his career with Polideportivo Cádiz and AD Tiempo Libre before joining San Fernando CD in 2013. On 8 December 2014, aged only 16, he made his senior – and first team – debut by coming on as a second-half substitute in a 2–2 Tercera División home draw against Algeciras CF.

Chacartegui subsequently appeared rarely for the B-side in the regional leagues while also playing for the main squad. On 16 May 2015 he scored his first senior goal, netting his team's second in a 4–1 home routing of La Palma CF.

On 13 July 2015, Chacartegui moved to Sevilla FC, returning to the youth setup. On 1 September 2017, after already representing the C-team, he signed a new two-year deal with the club, being immediately promoted to the reserves in Segunda División and being assigned the number 12 jersey.

Chacartegui made his professional debut on 4 February 2018, starting in a 0–1 home loss against SD Huesca. On 28 July 2020, he signed for Segunda División B side UCAM Murcia CF.

== Personal life ==
Felipe's grandfather, Javier, was also a footballer. A midfielder, he represented Cádiz CF in the 1960s.
