= Cristina Otero =

Spanish photographer and artist (born 1995)

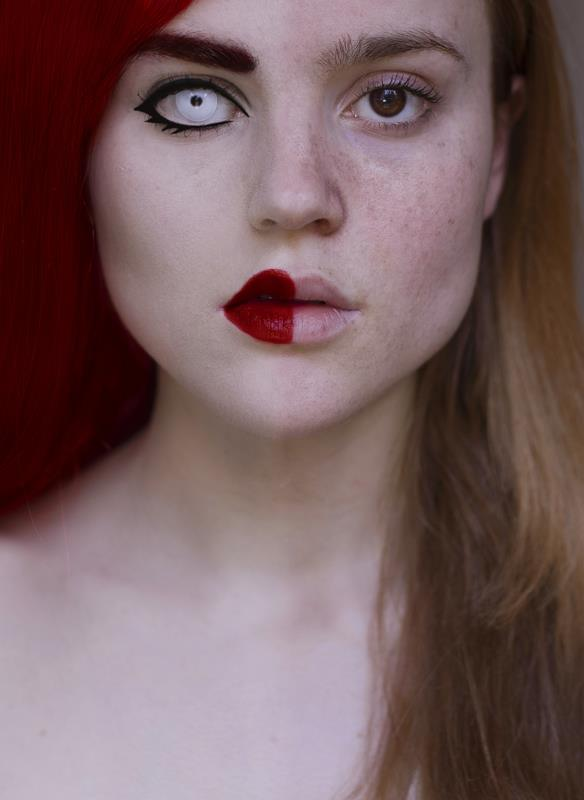
- Self-portrait of Otero in her portrait titled "identity"
- Born: Cristina Otero Pascual; November 29, 1995 (age 29); Pontevedra, Spain
- Occupation: Photographer
- Years active: 2008–present
- Website: Official website

Cristina Otero (born Cristina Otero Pascual; November 29, 1995) is a Spanish photographer and artist best known for her self portraits.

Otero is the youngest artist in Spain who has ever exhibited individually in an art gallery, when she was 15.

== Biography ==
Born in Pontevedra, Galicia, Spain, to Noemi Pascual and Luis Otero, Otero is the youngest of three children. Otero found her love for photography at a young age.

At 13, while watching America's Next Top Model, she found herself intrigued by the makeup, styling and poses that go into creating a major fashion photo shoot. Otero is self-taught.

== Career ==
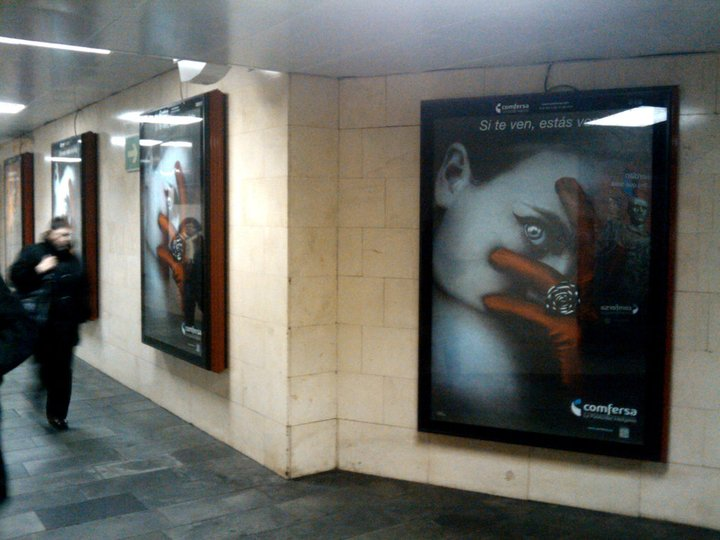
Renfe ad in Spain featuring Otero's photo

Otero uses a Pentax K-5 for shooting, most of the time she takes self portraits, specializing in close-up. Otero is the youngest artist in Spain who has ever exhibited individually in an art gallery, at the age of 15.

Her portraits have been showcased in exhibits across Spain including the Kir Royal Gallery in Valencia from October 15, 2011 to January 15, 2012; and again from June 7–10, 2012 in participation of MadridFoto.

An exhibit ran at the Fnac Parquesur in Madrid between March 1 – 31 in 2012, and one in the Fnac L'illa in Barcelona that began July 25, 2012 and went until September 10, 2012.

She has also exhibited in the "Fundación Caixa" in Carlet (Valencia, 2012) in the Fnac Marbella (Spain) (2013).

Otero's work has also been exhibited in Amsterdam (2012), Berlin (2012) and Algiers (2013).

She also has an ad campaign with the Spanish train wheel company, Renfe (2012–2013).

In 2022, she was one of the judges of the Istock Awards annual inclusion grant.

== Gallery ==
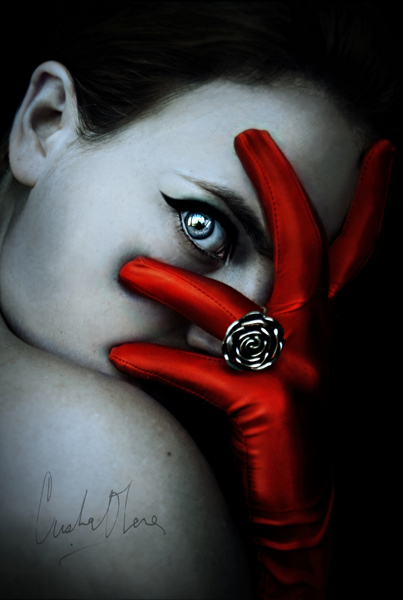
Self-portrait of Otero in her portrait titled "sinner."

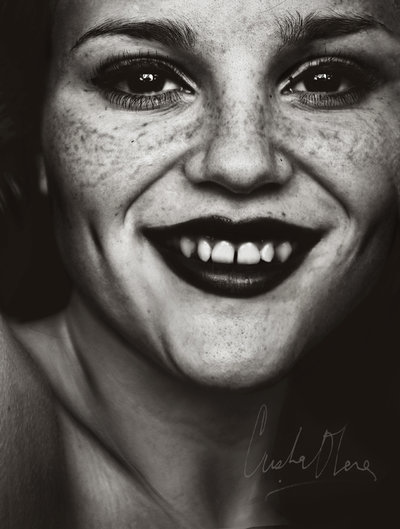
Self-portrait of Otero in her portrait titled "ID."
