= 1914 in Spain =

- Decades: 1890s; 1900s; 1910s; 1920s; 1930s
- See also: Other events of 1914; List of years in Spain

Events in the year 1914 in Spain.

== Incumbents ==
- Monarch: Alfonso XIII
- President of the Government: Eduardo Dato

== Births ==
- Narciso Perales (d. 1993)
