= Joan Sardà i Dexeus =

Spanish lawyer, economist, and author (1910–1995)

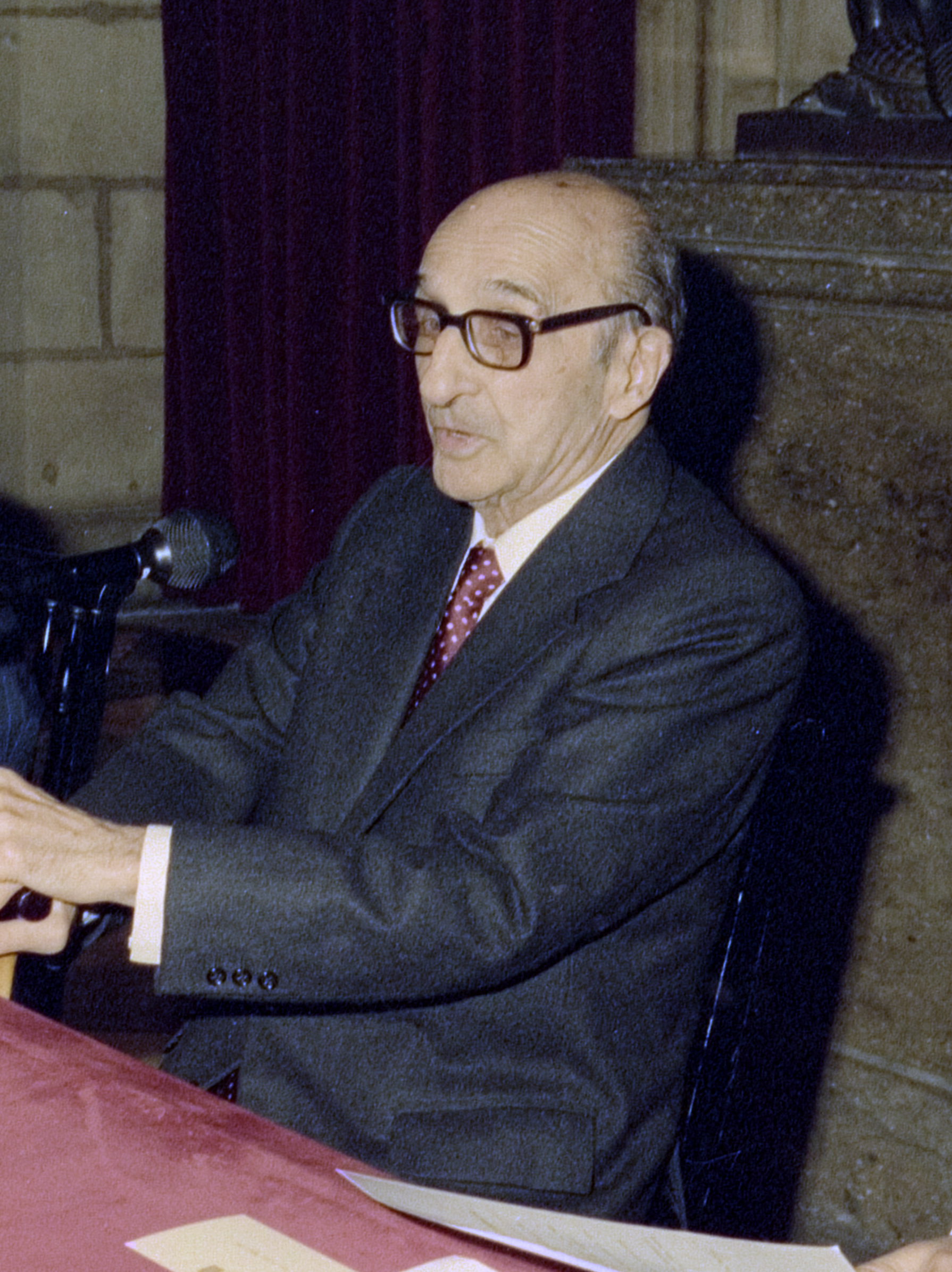
- Born: April 13, 1910; Barcelona, Spain
- Died: December 23, 1995 (aged 85)

Academic background
- Education: University of Barcelona (B.A.), 1932, Complutense University of Madrid (Ph.D.), 1933, London School of Economics

Academic work
- Discipline: Economics, Law
- School or tradition: Economist
- Institutions: University of Barcelona (1934–1939); University of Santiago de Compostela (1948); Central University of Venezuela (1951–1956); Complutense University of Madrid (1960)

Joan Sardà i Dexeus (April 13, 1910 – December 23, 1995) was a Spanish lawyer, economist and author, whose work inspired the Stabilization Plan in Francoist Spain in 1959 that led to the Spanish miracle of 1959–1973.

== Education ==
Born in Barcelona on April 13, 1910, Sardà obtained his secondary education diploma from the Instituto General y Técnico de Barcelona in 1927 and then went on to study Law at the University of Barcelona. While he was studying law, he developed a great interest for economics, leading him to become a regular contributor on economic subjects for the newspaper L'Opinió, and eventually to become part of the editing team of the magazine Economia i Finances(Economics and Finance). Upon graduating in 1932, he obtained a Ph.D. in Law from the Complutense University of Madrid, where he was tutored by Adolfo González Posada, a very influential academic of the time. He complemented his formation on economics at the London School of Economics and the Ludwig-Maximilians-Universität München, and then returned to Spain in 1934.

== Academic career and public service ==
Shortly after returning to Spain, Sardà began his academic career as an assistant professor of at the Faculty of Law and Social and Economic Sciences of University of Barcelona until the end of the civil war. Many of the professors he worked with during those years had positively influenced him to shift his career towards economics and expanded the curriculum of the faculty to include more economics-related subject. It was also during that time that he began his career as a public servant when he was named advisor to the Comissaria de Banca, Borsa i Estalvi (Banking, Savings and Stock Exchange Commissioner) in Barcelona. After the war ended, he stopped teaching for a few years. He was named president of the Association of Banks of Northeastern Spain and began contributing regularly to the publication España Bancaria. After several failed attempts to return to academic work, he was finally given a position at the University of Santiago de Compostela teaching Economic Policy and Public Finances. However, this would only last for a year, and in 1951 he was forced to move to Venezuela where he resumed his academic career at the Central University until 1956, while providing consultancy work for local banks.

When he returned to Spain he was a key contributor to the National Stabilization Plan of Alberto Ullastres Calvo y de Mariano Navarro Rubio that brought about the Spanish Miracle. The main components of the plan called for balancing the national budget, the liberalization of the labor market and international trade and a monetary policy aimed at controlling inflation. During this period of time, the Spanish economy boomed, taking it to levels close to those of Central Europe.

As Sardà's reputation grew, he helped found the faculty of Economics at the University of Barcelona and he was appointed director of the delegations of the International Monetary Fund and the World Bank in Spain. In the years that followed he wrote several articles and books focusing mainly on monetary policy. He also founded the Monthly Statistical Report of the Bank of Spain and worked with the central bank research and statistics unit. By the time the Spanish boom had worn off in the early 1970s, Joan Sardà had already become one of the most influential Spanish economists of the twentieth century.

Joan Sardà died on December 23, 1995.

== Awards ==
- 1982, Creu de Sant Jordi
- 1988, Medalla d'Or de la Generalitat de Catalunya
- 1993, Medal to Scientific Merit del Barcelona City Council
- 1994, King Jaume I Award on Economics

== Bibliography ==
- La política monetaria y las fluctuaciones de la economía española en el siglo XIX, Barcelona, 1948.
- Una introducción a la economía, Barcelona, 1950.
- Uniones aduaneras y uniones económicas, Madrid, 1953.
- La crisis monetaria internacional, Barcelona, 1968.
- El Banco de España, Madrid, 1971.
