= Leoncio Afonso =

Canary Islands scholar

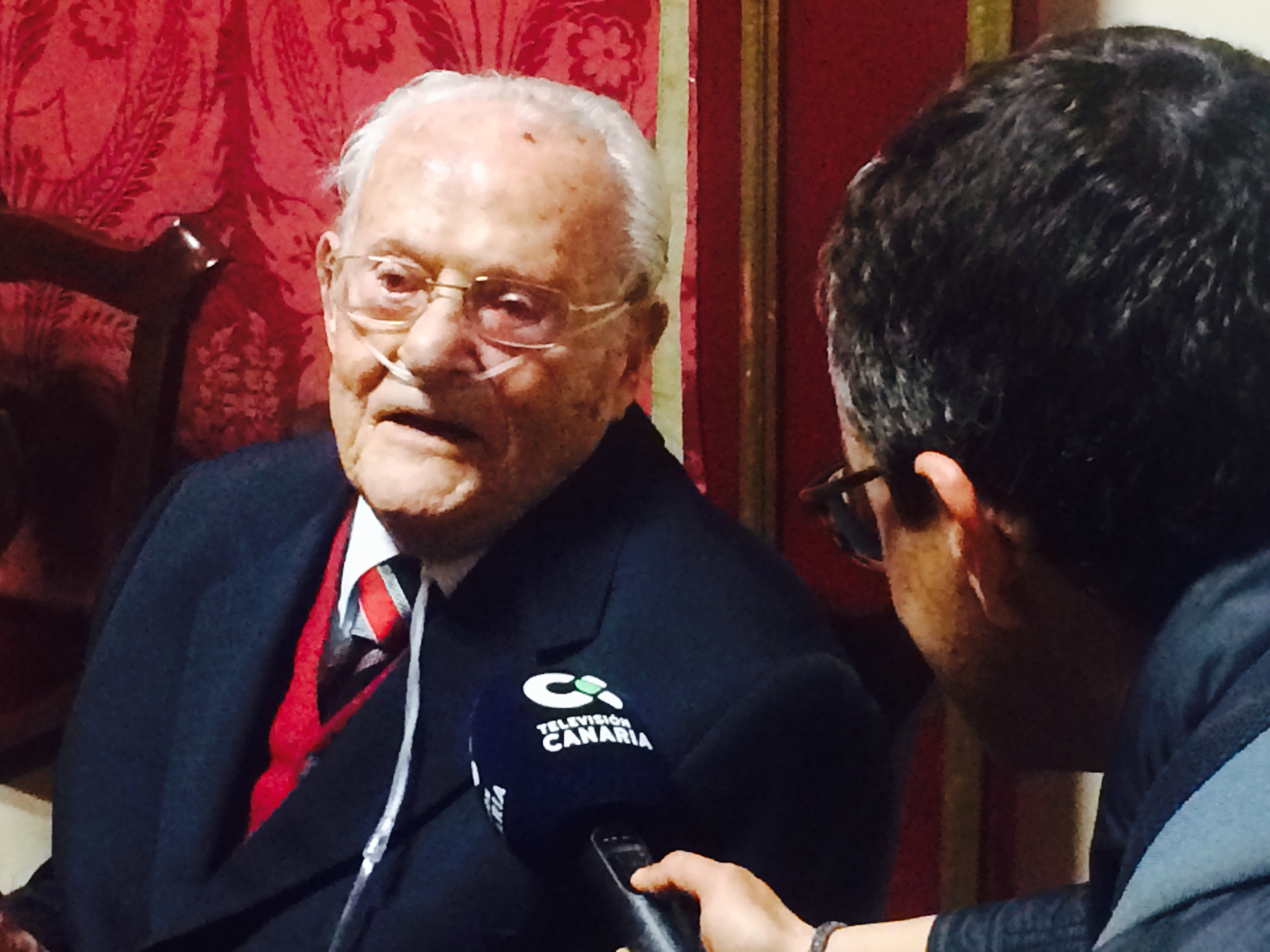

Leoncio Afonso Perez (12 September 1916 – 27 March 2017) was a professor of geography and an intellectual of the Canary Islands.

Afonso was born in Breña Alta, Canary Islands in September 1916. He made considerable contributions to the study of geography in the region, and he was bestowed an honorary doctorate from the University of La Laguna on 7 March 1997, in recognition of his life's work. His career was dedicated, among other things, to the study of the geography, history and toponymics of the Canary Islands. He died in San Cristobal de la Laguna, Canary Islands in March 2017 at the age of 100.

== Works ==
- Esquema de Geografía Física de Canarias, La Laguna 1953
- Geografía de Tenerife, Ministerio de Educación y Ciencia, Madrid 1974
- Aspectos Geográficos de Madeira y Azores La Laguna 1977
- Canarias (7 fascículos) en Conocer España, Salvat Editores, 1978
- Canarias, en Maravillas de la Península Ibérica, Seleciones, 1979
- “El Modelo Cerealista en la Agricultura Canaria” La Laguna,1982
- Mapas Murales de Canarias (a differentes escalas) 1985
- Geografía Física de Canarias, S/C. de Tfe. 1981
- Mapa Escolar de Canarias, S/C. de Tfe. 1986 (con colaboradores)
- Atlas Básico de Canarias, 1980 (con colaboradores)
- Atlas Interinsular de Canarias (en colaboración) S/C. de Tfe. 1990
- Geografía de Canarias (6 tomos). Director y con diversos trabajos en la misma. S/C. Tfe. 1985
- La toponimia como percepción del Espacio, la Laguna 1991
- Miscelánea de Temas Canarios, Cabildo Insular de Tfe. 1986
- Garafía, en homenaje a Juan Régulo, 1987
- La cubierta de madera en la vivienda rural del NW. de La Palma en Homenaje a Don José Pérez Vidal
- Geografía de La Palma, Santa Cruz de la Palma 1993
- Plan Integral de Norte de la Palma, colaborador, 1986, inédito.
- Góngaro, Origen y rasgos de la toponimia canaria. 1997
- Diversos artículos y prólogos de libros
- Artículos de prensa en La Tarde, Diario de Avisos, El Día y en Ya, (numerosos y en diversas fechas), sobre temas culturales, geográficos y de actualidad
