= Web Medica Acreditada =

Spanish-based nonprofit

Web Mèdica Acreditada (WMA)
- Type: Nonprofit
- Industry: Healthcare
- Founded: 1999
- Founder: Medical Association of Barcelona
- Headquarters: Barcelona, Spain
- Products: Quality Hallmark, Certification, Virtual Community, Semantic Web
- Website: Web Mèdica Acreditada

Web Medica Acreditada (Health-related content Websites Accreditation Programme) is an international quality and certification programme of health-related content websites that was launched in 1999 by the Medical Association of Barcelona (Spain).

Once the review of the web is made and if it adjusts to them criteria of quality, the seal of quality that certifies that such web has been revised and meets a series of criteria of quality is granted. WMA is based on the "Principios de Buena Práctica" created for this purpose for webs with medical information, adhering to the code of ethics of the Medical Associatiation of Barcelona and the quality criteria for websites of health of the European Union (eEurope).

The general quality criteria are organized as follows:

- Certification
- Identification
- Content
- Privacy and confidentiality
- Control and validation
- Advertisement
- Virtual consultation and second opinion

There is an index of Web sites that have earned the seal of quality in the WMA website and it has created the "WMA-Google search engine" which allows you to search only among the accredited websites.
