= José Costas Gual =

Spanish astronomer

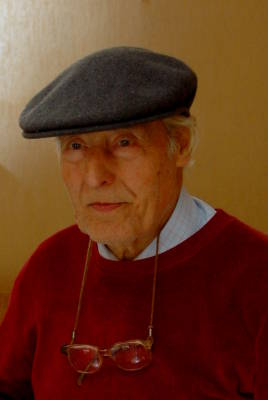
- Born: 19 January 1918; Sant Celoni, Spain
- Died: 9 July 2011 (aged 93)
- Occupation: Amateur Astronomer

José Costas Gual (19 January 1918 – 9 July 2011) was a Spanish amateur astronomer.

== Biography ==
José Costas Gual founded the group Pro Divulgación Astronómicä (PDA) on 24 September 1936, in the municipality of San Celoni, a province of Barcelona.

All the observations made by José Costas after that date have filled the "Diarios" of the PDA to date, including activities, observations, or thoughts related to astronomy. They contain more than 72 years of astronomical history, in more than 25 volumes, which are currently in the process of being digitized and published on his official page.

Costas had a brief but intense relationship with the Spanish astronomer José Comas y Solá, until the death of Comas in December 1937.

After 1959, Costas dedicated himself to polishing mirrors for small reflecting telescopes, of which more than 3500 were built, an activity which won him great popularity in Spain.

== See also ==
- List of astronomers
