= Pepa Millán =

Spanish politician

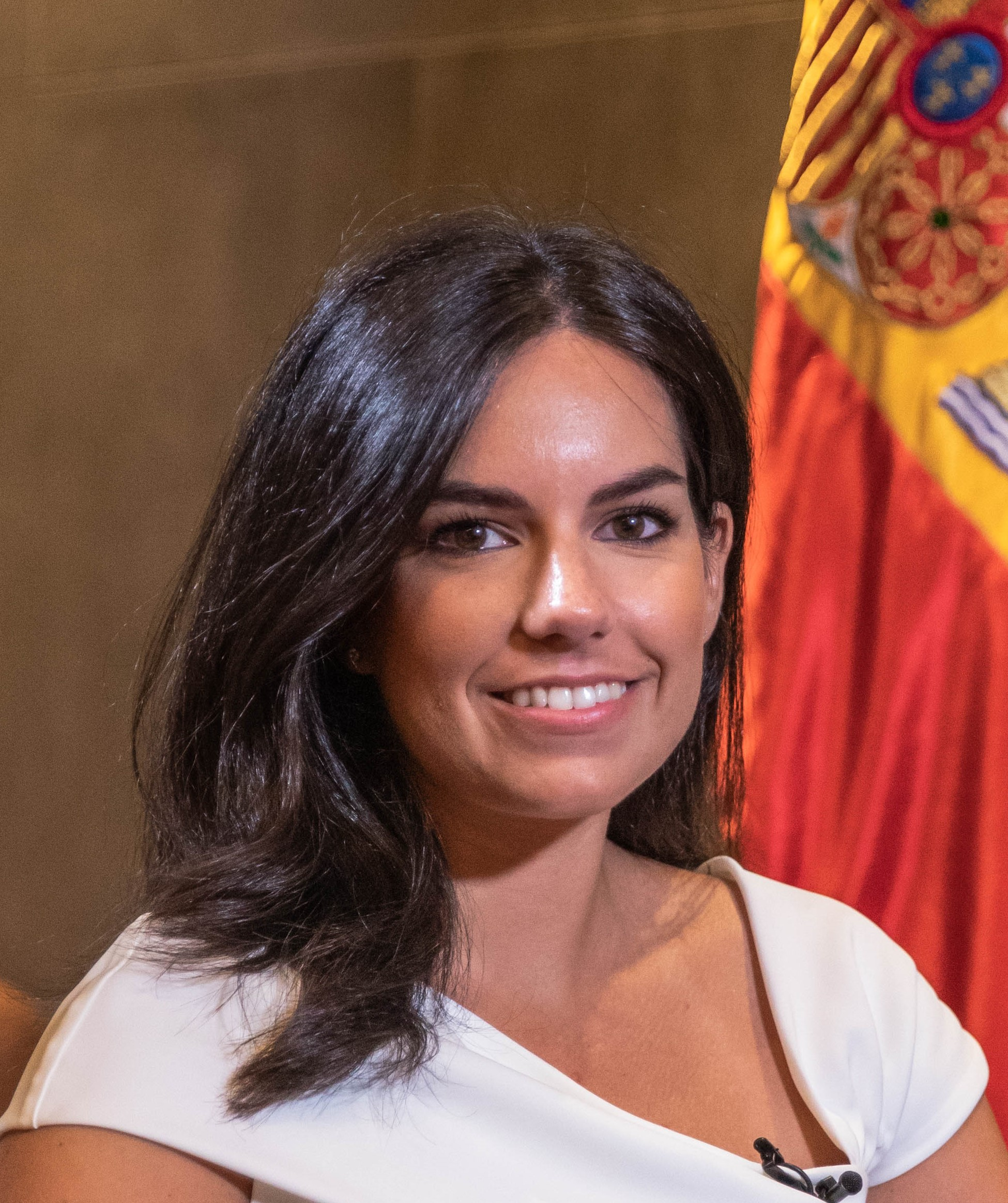
- Millan in 2023

Member of the Senate
- In office July 28, 2022 – May 29, 2023
- Constituency: Parliament of Andalusia

Member of the Congress of Deputies
- Incumbent
- Assumed office August 17, 2023
- Constituency: Madrid

Spokesperson of Vox in the Congress of Deputies
- Incumbent
- Assumed office August 16, 2023

Personal details
- Born: Maria José Rodríguez de Millán Parro; March 21, 1995 (age 31) Cabra, Córdoba, Andalusia, Spain
- Party: Vox
- Education: University of Seville; Pablo de Olavide University
- Occupation: Lawyer, columnist, politician

Maria José Rodríguez de Millán Parro (born March 21, 1995), better known as Pepa Millán, is a Spanish lawyer, columnist, and politician. She is a member of parliament for Madrid and spokesperson for Vox in the Congress of Deputies since July 2023.

After graduating in law from the University of Seville (2018), she completed her university education with a double master's degree in Access to the Legal Profession and Contract Law and Civil Liability, Consumer Law and Extracontractual Liability at the Pablo de Olavide University (2020). She also studied for the competitive examination to become a property registrar. Previously she had been a columnist for the newspaper La Razón.

== Political career ==
Millán began as an advisor to the Vox Parliamentary Group in the XI legislature of the Andalusian Parliament. Much of her work in the party focused on the areas of employment, equality, advocacy, and the presidency.

In the 2022 Andalusian regional elections, Millán ran as number two for the constituency of Cordoba. Based on the representation granted by the results of said autonomic elections to each political formation, the senators appointed by the Parliament of Andalusia were appointed, and Vox was assigned one senator, who was to be Jacobo González-Robatto, but established criterion of the obligatory quotas of men and women (gender quota) obliged Vox to appoint a woman after knowing who are those elected by both the People's Party (PP) and the Spanish Socialist Workers' Party (PSOE), so that on July 26, 2022, Millán, at only twenty-seven years old, was elected to represent Vox in the Senate for Andalusia. In the Senate, she starred in tough debates with the government of Pedro Sánchez.

In the 2023 Spanish general election, she was candidate number five for the Madrid constituency, being elected deputy, and is designated by Vox as its spokesperson in the Lower House during the XV Cortes Generales.
