= 1921 in Spain =

- Decades: 1900s; 1910s; 1920s; 1930s; 1940s
- See also: Other events of 1921; List of years in Spain

Events in the year 1921 in Spain.

== Incumbents ==
- Monarch: Alfonso XIII
- Prime Minister:
  - until 8 March: Eduardo Dato
  - 8 March-13 March: Gabino Bugallal
  - 13 March-14 August: Manuel Allendesalazar
  - starting 14 August: Antonio Maura

== Events ==
- March 8 - Prime Minister Eduardo Dato Iradier is assassinated while on his way home from the parliament building in Madrid

== Births ==
- August 9 - Elías Amézaga (died 2008)

== Deaths ==
- March 8 - Eduardo Dato e Iradier (b. 1856)
- April 7 - Víctor Mirecki Larramat (b. 1847)
