= Maria Silva Cruz =

Spanish anarchist (1915–1936)

Maria Silva Cruz La Libertaria
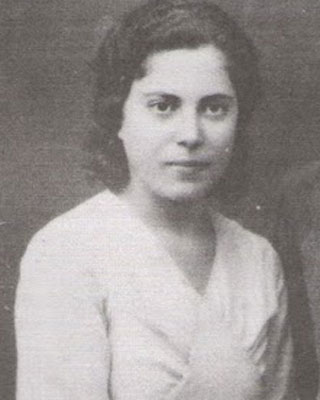
- Maria Silva Cruz
- Born: 20 April 1915; Casas Viejas, Cádiz, Spain
- Died: 23 August 1936 (aged 21); Ronda, Málaga, Spain
- Cause of death: Execution by firing squad
- Known for: Survival of the Casas Viejas incident

Maria Silva Cruz (20 April 1915 – 23 August 1936) was an Andalusian anarchist and a hero of the Casas Viejas Uprising in Spain. She was also known as "La Libertaria."

== Biography ==
Silva Cruz was born and raised in Casas Viejas (now Benalup-Casas Viejas) in Andalusia. Her parents were day laborers and her father, Juan Silva Gonzalez and her uncle were both members of the Confederación Nacional del Trabajo (CNT), an anarchist group which supported reforms for workers.

In January 1933, the CNT demonstrated in Casas Viejas and attempted to get the government's Civil Guard to give up their power. Silva Cruz and her friends, Manuel Lago and Gallinito, were part of the demonstrations on 11 January. During the demonstrations, two guards were wounded. More troops from the Civil Guard and Assault Guard were sent in to stop the CNT. Many of the villagers fled, but some anarchists attempted to hide in the house of Silva Cruz's grandfather, Francisco Cruz Gutiérrez, who was nicknamed Seisdedos ("Six fingers"). The house was set on fire by the forces of the police and everyone inside was killed, except for Silva Cruz and a cousin. She emerged, burned and carrying the young boy to safety. She persuaded the guard not to kill her or the boy and then she fled to her mother's house. Silva Cruz was arrested on 14 January 1933.

Silva Cruz was jailed at Medina Sidonia and then transferred to Cadiz for a month's imprisonment. She met Miguel Perez Cordon, a member of the CNT while at Medina Sidonia. Perez Cordon courted her and after two months, the couple moved to Madrid. In May 1935, they had a son, Juan Perez Silva. The family moved back to Andalusia, living in Ronda.

Fascists eventually occupied Ronda in July 1936, and Perez Cordon fled to the mountains while Silva Cruz stayed with her young son at home. She was arrested by the Civil Guard and her son was taken from her. She and two other people were executed on 23 August 1936 at dawn.

Like many people who participated in the Spanish Revolution, Silva Cruz's remains were never identified. She was also never listed as officially dead until 2010. Her son, who grew up with Silva Cruz's aunt, worked throughout his life to try to find Maria Silva Cruz's remains in order to bury them and plant flowers for her.

== Bibliography ==
- Gutiérrez Molina, José Luis (2008). Casas Viejas: del crimen a la esperanza - María Silva "Libertaria" y Miguel Pérez Cordón: dos vidas unidas por un ideal (1933-1939) (in Spanish). Córdoba: Almuzara. ISBN 9788496968325. OCLC 892142061.
- Mintz, Jerome R. (1994) [1982]. The Anarchists of Casas Viejas. Bloomington: Indiana University Press. ISBN 0-253-20854-8. LCCN 93-2425. OCLC 807238894.
- Montseny, Federica (1951). María Silva: la libertaria (in Spanish). Toulouse: Universo. OCLC 807143813.
- Sender, Ramón J. (2000). Viaje a la aldea del crimen (in Spanish). Madrid: Vosa. ISBN 84-8218-034-7. OCLC 807575864.
