= Elías Amézaga =

Spanish writer (1921–2008)

Elías Amézaga (1921–2008) was a Spanish writer. He was born in Bilbao on 9 August 1921 and died in Guecho on 13 April 2008.

== Education and work ==
He obtained a law degree from the University of Oviedo. After more than 25 years of research he completed a bio-bibliography of ten volumes entitled Basque authors. He wrote more than sixty plays, essays and biographies on Miguel de Unamuno, Jose Maria Salaverria, Sabino Arana, José Antonio Aguirre, Jose Maria Olivares Larrondo and others.

He is renowned for his immense work in favour of Basque writings, studying any author, regardless of their ideology.

== Collaborations ==
- Literary collaborator on Bilbao Iron and The Voice of Asturias in Oviedo and in Deia
- The Northern Gazette
- The Basque Daily
- The Bilbao Monday Paper
- The Courier
- Journal 16
- Egin
- Muga
- The voice of Vizcaya
- Sancho el Sabio Institute Bulletin
- Arbola
- Pergola
- The Deusto Letter
- Contemporary History
- Kultura
- The World of the Basque Country
- The Álava Journal

== Awards ==
The Friends of the Country Royal Basque Society and the Basque Studies Society (Eusko Ikaskuntza) recognized the extent of his effort. He was named an emeritus member of the Friends of the Country Royal Basque Society and received the Lekuona Manuel Award from the Basque Studies Society in 2005. The Bilbao City Council, meanwhile, named him distinguished Villager in 2001.

== Other recognition ==
He died in his house at the Guecho tower on 13 April 2008 at 86 years of age.

Three biographies have been written about this author

- Elias Amezaga, writer of the Basque people (Madrid, 1990) by Mario Angel Marrodán
- Elías Amezaga Urlezaga. (San Sebastián, 2006) by Abraham Amezaga (grandson of Elías Amézaga
- Elías Amezaga: Life and Work, (San Sebastián, 2009) by Abraham Amezaga.

He was honoured with a tribute on April 13, 2011 (the anniversary of his death), via the establishment of the First Elias Amezaga Prize. The first winner was Arrola Ildefonso, playwright and Bilbaine journalist, who was also a personal friend of the honoree.
