= Encarna Hernández =

Spanish basketball player (1917–2022)

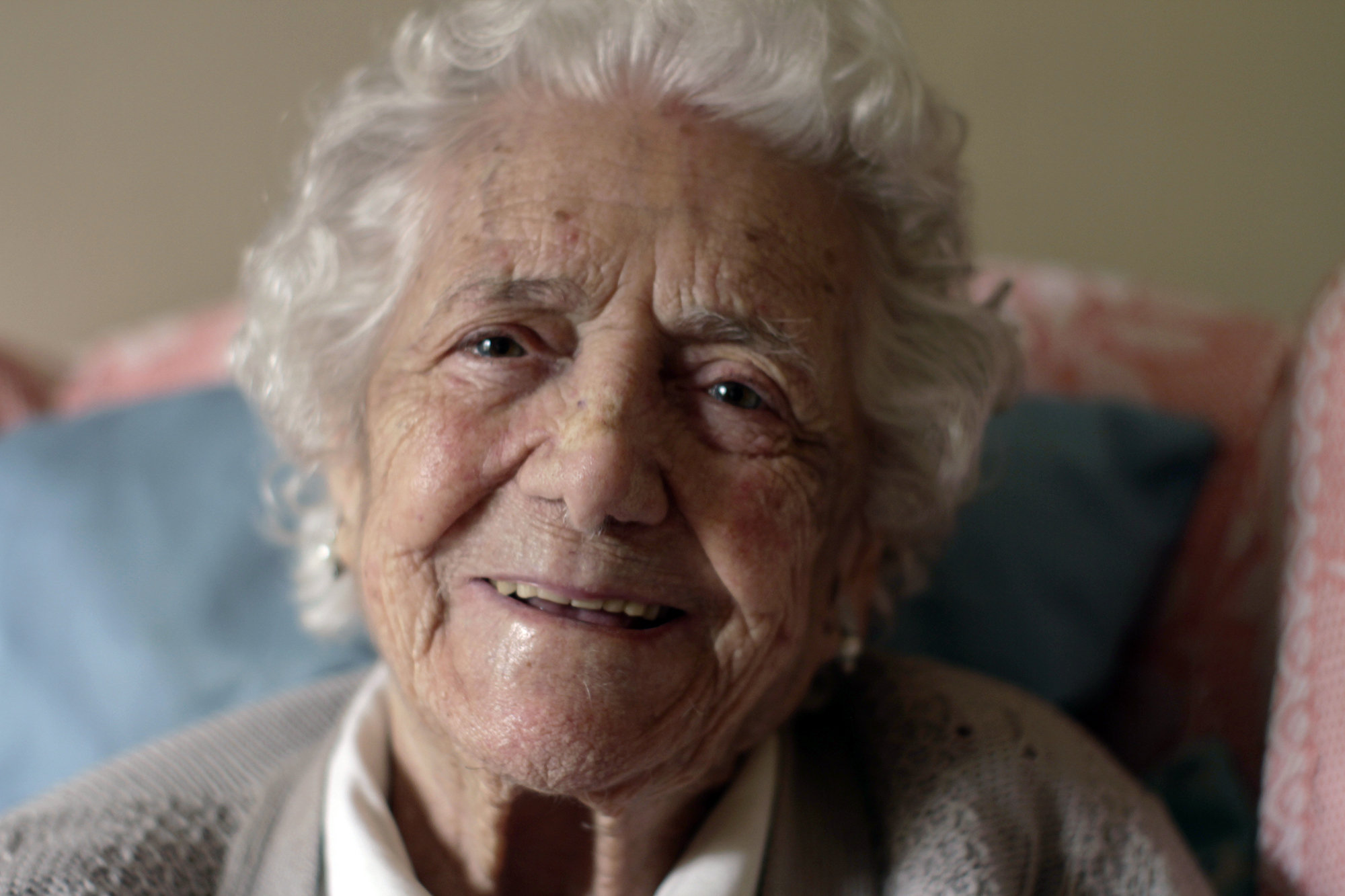
- Born: 23 January 1917; Lorca, Spain
- Died: 19 December 2022 (aged 105); Barcelona, Spain
- Occupation: Professional basketball player

Encarnación Hernández Ruiz (23 January 1917 – 19 December 2022) was a Spanish pioneer of women's basketball as a professional player and coach.

== Early life ==
Encarna Hernández was born in the Region of Murcia town of Lorca in 1917. At the age of 10, she arrived in Barcelona together with her parents and ten siblings, as her father was working at the Universal Exposition of 1929. Hernández began playing basketball at the age of 13 with the boys and girls in her neighborhood on a field built by Emilio Planelles, who would later become her husband. She not only played basketball but also was involved in other sports such as cycling and skating. For her, the most important thing was playing sports. At 154 centimetres (5 ft 1 in) tall, Hernández was known as "the girl with the hook shot" for her ability to use this resource.

== Basketball career ==
In 1931, Hernández participated in the founding of the Atlas Club, to which her husband also belonged. Aurora Jordà and Hernández were among the most outstanding players on the women's team, with Hernández being the top scorer of the club, even above the men. In 1932, the Atlas Club was dissolved and its players became part of Laietà. There she was trained by Fernando Muscat and would cross paths with players from the Club Femení i d'Esports such as Maria "Mary" Morros or Carmen Sugrañes, on a team in which they won the first Catalan Women's Championship held in the 1935/36 season, winning all of their matches.

Hernández was selected to participate in athletics events of the People's Olympiad, but this was not held as a result of the outbreak of the Spanish Civil War. During the Civil War, she continued to play in basketball games despite the difficulties of the war itself, these games being more exhibitions than official competitions. At the end of the Civil War, she was a basketball instructor appointed by the Falange's Sección Femenina to make "strong and healthy women for the country." Although she became a popular figure in the local sports press, it was only when she played for the Falange that she was paid a modest amount of money, so she had to work hard off the court and combine her work hours with training.

After the Civil War, apart from the Sección Femenina team, Hernández played for Laietà, Cottet and Moix Llambés, teams in which her sister Maruja also played. She won championships in Spain with both Cottet and the Women's Section.

In 1944 Hernández received an offer from FC Barcelona, staying at the club until 1953, retiring from the competition at the age of 36 to be a mother. She got an offer from the Gruppo Universitari Fascisti of Fascist Italy, which the Francoist dictatorship did not allow her to accept.

== Impact and later life ==
Hernández broke barriers in the world of sports in the 1930s and was active until 1953. She was one of the pioneers of Spanish basketball, as a player, coach and referee. She was the first female coach in Spain when she led the Peña García de Hospitalet team in 1932, and went on to coach five more teams. With a ball in her hands, she was characterized as a national heroine on the level of "those blessed women Victoria Kent, Clara Campoamor, Federica Montseny ...". Hernández was also one of the first women in Barcelona to obtain a driving license in Francoist Spain. Her home became a pilgrimage site for many basketball players, including Amaya Valdemoro and Elisa Aguilar Laia Palau (from the same neighborhood of Barcelona). At her apartment, she had a small museum with mementos and compilations from her playing and coaching career.

In 2016, The Girl with the Hook, a documentary made by Raquel Barrera Sutorra, and produced by Ochichornia, was released, a film that followed Hernández from 96 to 99 years old and provided an account of the trajectory of this basketball pioneer.

Hernández died in Barcelona on 19 December 2022, at age 105.

=== Teams as a player ===
- Atlas Club; CE Laietà; FC Barcelona; Sección Femenina; Peña García; Cottet; Moix Llambés; Fabra y Coats

=== Teams as a coach ===
- Cottet; Moix Llambés; Sección Femenina; Peña García

== Awards and recognition ==
- 2014: Tribute from the Spanish Federation along with other pioneers of women's basketball.
- 2016: "La Niña del Gancho", documentary tribute to a pioneer of Spanish women's sports.
- 2016: Lifetime Achievement Award, a lifetime dedicated to the sport of the Autonomous Community and the Association of the Sports Press of the Region of Murcia.
- 2017: Tribute from FC Barcelona as a former player of the club, during the Barcelona-Manresa game on 12 February 2017.
