= 1920 in Spain =

- Decades: 1900s; 1910s; 1920s; 1930s; 1940s
- See also: Other events of 1920; List of years in Spain

Events in the year 1920 in Spain.

== Incumbents ==
- Monarch: Alfonso XIII
- President of the Council of Ministers: Manuel Allendesalazar y Muñoz de Salazar (until 5 May), Eduardo Dato (starting 5 May)

== Deaths ==
- January 4 - Benito Pérez Galdós, author (b. 1843)
- Raimundo de Madrazo y Garreta, painter (b. 1841)
