= 1916 in Spain =

- Decades: 1890s; 1900s; 1910s; 1920s; 1930s
- See also: History of Spain; Timeline of Spanish history; List of years in Spain

Events in the year 1916 in Spain.

== Incumbents ==
- Monarch: Alfonso XIII
- President of the Government: Álvaro de Figueroa, 1st Count of Romanones

== Births ==
- February 12 - Damián Iguacén Borau, Roman Catholic prelate (d. 2020)
- April 19 - Delio Rodríguez, road racing cyclist and sprinter (d. 1994)
- May 11 - Camilo José Cela, author (d. 2002)
- September 12 - Leoncio Afonso, geographer (d. 2017)

== Deaths ==
- March 7 - José Ferrer, guitarist and composer (b. 1835)
- March 24 - Enrique Granados, composer (b. 1867)
