= Pere Alberch =

Spanish naturalist, biologist and embryologist

Pere Alberch Vie
- Born: 2 November 1954; Badalona (Barcelona), Spain
- Died: 13 March 1998 (aged 43); Madrid, Spain
- Education: University of Kansas; University of California
- Scientific career
- Fields: Embryology

Pere Alberch Vie (2 November 1954, Badalona – 13 March 1998, Madrid) was a Spanish naturalist, biologist and embryologist. He was a professor at Harvard University from 1980 to 1989, and director of the Museo Nacional de Ciencias Naturales, Madrid. He studied in the United States, earning a bachelor's degree from the University of Kansas (1976) and a PhD from the University of California, Berkeley (1980).

== Biography ==
In 1976 he graduated after studying Biology and Environmental Sciences at the University of Kansas. Four years later he obtained a PhD in Zoology at the University of California. Between 1980 and 1989 he worked as both a biology professor at Harvard University and as a curator of herpetology at the Museum of Comparative Zoology. He worked as an editor for research journals such as Trends in Ecology and Evolution (since 1993), Biodiversity Letters (since 1992), Journal of Theoretical Biology (since 1985) and Journal of Evolutionary Biology (1986-1991). In 1989 he returned to Spain as a research professor for the Spanish National Research Council and carried out an important role as director of the Museo Nacional de Ciencias Naturales. In 1998 the Cavanilles Institute of Biodiversity and Evolutional Biology, a new research center located in Valencia, was interested in including Alberch to its staff. He died on March 13, 1998, at the age of 43.

== Works ==
- Alberch, P.; Gould, S. J.; Oster, G. F.; Wake, D. B. (1979). "Size and shape in ontogeny and phylogeny". Paleobiology. 5 (3): 296–317. Bibcode:1979Pbio....5..296A. doi:10.1017/s0094837300006588. S2CID 83795042.
- Odell, G.M.; Oster, G.; Alberch, P.; Burnside, B. (1981). "The mechanical basis of morphogenesis". Developmental Biology. 85 (2): 446–462. doi:10.1016/0012-1606(81)90276-1.
- Alberch, P.; Alberch, J. (1981). "Heterochronic mechanisms of morphological diversification and evolutionary change in the neotropical salamander, Bolitoglossa occidentalis (Amphibia; Plethodontidae)". Journal of Morphology. 167 (2): 249–264. doi:10.1002/jmor.1051670208. PMID 30119585. S2CID 52031237.
- Odell, G.; Oster, G. F.; Alberch, P.; Burnside, B. (1981). "The mechanical basis of morphogenesis. I. A mechanical model of epithelial tissue folding and certain gastrulation patterns". Developmental Biology. 85 (2): 446–462. doi:10.1016/0012-1606(81)90276-1. PMID 7196351.
- Oster, G. F.; Alberch, P. (1982). "Evolution and bifurcation of developmental programs". Evolution. 36 (3): 444–459. doi:10.1111/j.1558-5646.1982.tb05066.x. PMID 28568040.
- Alberch, P.; Gale, E. (1985). "A developmental analysis of an evolutionary trend: Digital reductions in amphibians". Evolution. 39 (1): 8–23. doi:10.2307/2408513. JSTOR 2408513. PMID 28563634.
- Alberch, P (1985). "Problems with the interpretation of developmental sequences". Systematic Zoology. 34 (1): 46–58. doi:10.2307/2413344. JSTOR 2413344.
- Maynard Smith, J.; Burian, R.; Kauffman, S.; Alberch, P.; Campbell, J.; Goodwin, B.; Lande, R.; Raup, D.; Wolpert, L. (1985). "Developmental Constraints and Evolution: A Perspective from the Mountain Lake Conference on Development and Evolution". The Quarterly Review of Biology. 60 (3): 265–287. doi:10.1086/414425. S2CID 85201850.
- Shubin, N.H.; Alberch, P. (1986). "A Morphogenetic Approach to the Origin and Basic Organization of the Tetrapod Limb". Evolutionary Biology. Vol. 20. pp. 319–387. doi:10.1007/978-1-4615-6983-1_6. ISBN 978-1-4615-6985-5.
- Oster, G. F.; Shubin, N.; Murray, J. D; Alberch, P. (1988). "Evolution and morphogenetic rules. The shape of the vertebrate limb in ontogeny and phylogeny". Evolution. 42 (5): 862–884. doi:10.2307/2408905. JSTOR 2408905. PMID 28581162.
