= Jaume Barberà =

Catalan director and television presenter

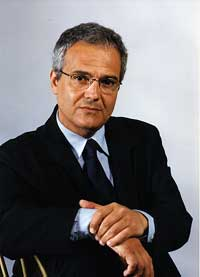
Jaume Barberà in 2018.

Jaume Barberà i Ribas (born Mollet del Vallès, Spain 1955) is a Catalan director and television presenter. Since 2014, he has directed and presented the program Retrats, and takes part in talk shows on RAC 1. He is known for presenting various programs, including Telenotícies, Singulars, Els Matins, Bon Dia Catalunya, Paral·lel, and Retrats, which feature contemporary personalities.

In 2012, Barberà published Singulars: Escoltar per Aprendre, a book that collected the most highlighted interviews of Singulars. The following year he published S'ha acabat el bròquil.
