= Laura Corbacho =

Spanish actress and drag queen

Laura Corbacho Garrido
- Born: 5 September 1998 (age 26); Cáceres, Spain
- Occupation: Actress and LGBT activist

Laura Corbacho Garrido (born 5 September 1998) is a Spanish actress and drag queen, who performs under the stage name Jenevagina. She is known for her roles in the television series Paquita Salas and Valeria.

== Career ==
At a young age, she decided to pursue a career in acting. In 2019, she made her acting debut in the television series Terror y feria. Later that year, she acted in Paquita Salas on Netflix.

As well as being an actress, Corbacho performs as a drag queen in Madrid. In 2021 she auditioned for the first season of Drag Race España, although she was not cast. Also in that year, she played the lead in a short film, Marinera de luces.

== Personal life ==
Corbacho is a transgender woman. She was born in Cáceres, Spain. She currently lives in Madrid.

== Filmography ==
=== Television series ===
Year	Title	Role
2019	Terror y feria	Luna
2019	Paquita Salas	Laura Corbacho
2022	Valeria	Miriam
2023	Valeria	Miriam

=== Film ===
Year	Title
2021	Marinera de luces
