= Carmen Llorca =

Spanish historian

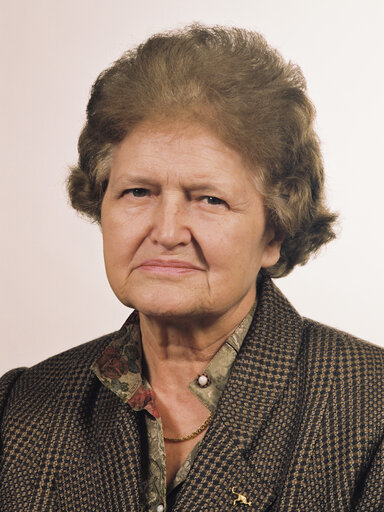

Member of the European Parliament for Spain
- In office January 1, 1986 – July 18, 1994

Member of the Congress of Deputies for the Province of Madrid
- In office November 1982 – April 23, 1986

Personal details
- Born: Carmen Llorca Villaplana; November 29, 1921 Alcoy, Spain
- Died: June 29, 1998 (aged 76) Madrid, Spain
- Party: People's Coalition (1986-1987); People's Alliance (1986-1989); People's Party (1989-)
- Other political affiliations: (in the European Parliament): ED (1986-1989); EPP (1989-)
- Occupation: Politician & historian

Carmen Llorca Villaplana (November 29, 1921, in Alcoy – June 29, 1998, in Madrid) was a Spanish historian, writer, and politician. As a professor of history at the University of Alcalá, her work focused on Elizabeth II and Emilio Castelar. From 1982 to 1986, she served on the Congress of Deputies, and from 1986 to 1994, she served at the European Parliament. She was decorated with the Civil Order of Alfonso X, the Wise and the Ordre des Arts et des Lettres.
