= Manuel Salvat =

Cuban baseball player (born 1900)

- Second baseman
- Born: 1900; Havana, Cuba
- Died: Unknown

Negro league baseball debut
- 1925, for the Cuban Stars (East)

Last appearance
- 1925, for the Cuban Stars (East)

Eastern Colored League statistics
- Batting average: .106
- Home runs: 0
- Runs batted in: 2
- Stats at Baseball Reference

Teams
- Cuban Stars (East) (1925)

Manuel Salvat (1900 – death date unknown) was a Cuban professional baseball second baseman in the Negro leagues in 1925.

A native of Havana, Cuba, Salvat played for the Cuban Stars (East) in 1925. In 14 recorded games, he posted five hits and six walks in 54 plate appearances for a batting average of .106 and an on-base percentage (OBP) of .208. Salvat hit no home runs and recorded two runs batted in (RBI).
