= Alejandra Soler =

Spanish teacher and politician (1913–2017)

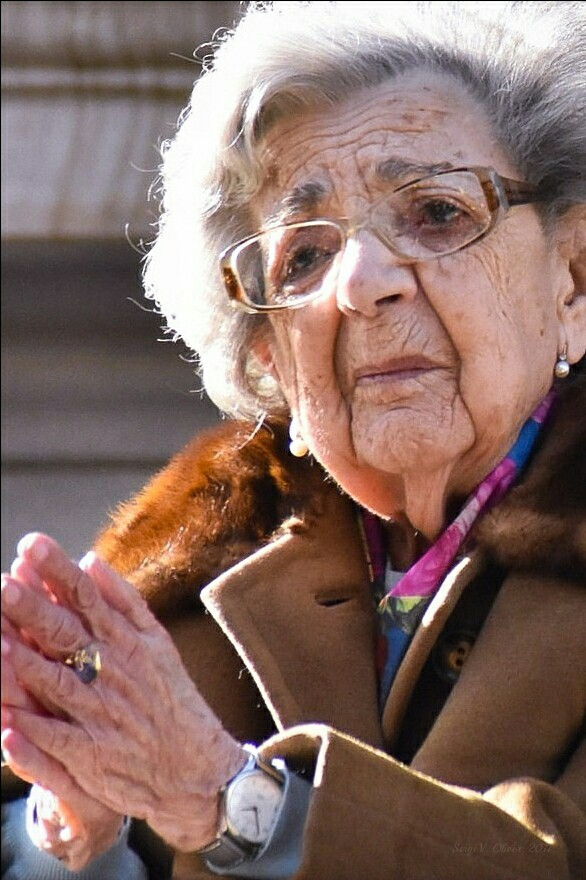
- Alejandra Soler in 2017
- Born: 8 July 1913; Valencia, Spain
- Died: 1 March 2017 (aged 103); Valencia, Spain
- Occupations: teacher, politician
- Notable work: La vida es un río caudaloso con peligrosos rápidos, 2009
- Spouse: Arnoldo Azzatti

Alejandra Soler Gilabert (8 July 1913 – 1 March 2017) was a Spanish politician and schoolteacher. She also worked for the Diplomatic Academy of the Ministry of Foreign Affairs of the Russian Federation.

== Life ==
She studied at the Institución de la Enseñanza para la Mujer, the Instituto Lluís Vives and humanities and schoolteaching at the university, where she was also in the athletic federation FUE.

She took part in the revolts against Miguel Primo de Rivera, and in 1934, she became a member of the communist party.

After the Spanish Civil War, she was in a French refugee camp, where she could later run away with her husband Arnoldo Azzatti (whose father was the journalist Félix Azzatti) to the Soviet Union, where she worked as a schoolteacher for the Spanish refugee children. In World War II, she saved 14 children in the Battle of Stalingrad.

She took part in the 15-M Movement in 2011.

== Works ==
- 2009, La vida es un río caudaloso con peligrosos rápidos
