= Guillem Rodríguez =

Spanish footballer

Personal information
- Full name: Guillem Rodríguez Martínez
- Date of birth: 13 February 1998 (age 28)
- Place of birth: Girona, Spain
- Height: 1.73 m (5 ft 8 in)
- Position: Right-back

Team information
- Current team: Europa
- Number: 2

Youth career
- Girona

Senior career*
| Years | Team | Apps | (Gls) |
| 2017–2019 | Horta | 40 | (0) |
| 2019–2021 | Real Madrid Castilla | 24 | (0) |
| 2021–2022 | MAT | | |
| 2022–2023 | ADO Den Haag | 24 | (0) |
| 2024 | Rayo Majadahonda | 6 | (0) |
| 2025– | Europa | 50 | (0) |
- * Club domestic league appearances and goals as of 25 May 2026

Guillem Rodríguez Martínez (born 13 February 1998) is a Spanish professional footballer who plays as a right-back for Primera Federación club CE Europa.

== Career ==
Born in Girona, Catalonia, Rodríguez signed in 2018 for Spanish fourth tier side Horta. In 2019, he signed for Real Madrid Castilla in the Spanish third tier. In 2021, he signed for Moroccan second-tier club MAT. Before the second half of 2021–22, Rodríguez signed for ADO Den Haag in the Dutch second tier. On 24 April 2022, he debuted for ADO Den Haag during a 1–1 draw with Jong FC Utrecht.
