= Maria Teresa Pelegrí i Marimón =

Spanish composer

Maria Teresa Pelegrí i Marimón (4 March 1907– 18 March 1996) was a Spanish composer. She was born in Barcelona and studied piano as a child. When she married, she gave up her musical activities, but after twenty years renewed her interest. She studied piano with Joan Gibert and Carles Pellicer, counterpoint and fugue with Josep Poch and composition with Josep Soler. She also took classes on twentieth-century music with Carles Guinovart.

Personal papers (scores) of Maria Teresa Pelegrí are preserved in the Biblioteca de Catalunya.

== Works ==
Selected works include:

- Praeludium und Tiento for organ (1975)
- Quatre chansons sentimentales: "Le coucher du soleil romantique", text Charles Baudelaire; "L'heure exquise", text of Paul Verlaine; "Autome" [sic for "Automne"], text by Guillaume Apollinaire; "Saisir", text by Jules Supervielle
- Per a Viola i Piano
- Duetto for Cello and Piano
- First String Quartet (1974)
- Second String Quartet (1984)
- Third String Quartet
- Tocatta for nine
- Passacaglia for Wind, bass, percussion
- Variations for orchestra
- Tragic poem for orchestra, inspired by La casa de Bernarda Alba of Federico García Lorca
- Sinfonietta for wood and string orchestra
- Concerto for Violin and Orchestra
- Contrasts for Orchestra
- Two Songs for Mixed Choir: "Spring", "Infant Joy", texts of William Blake (1976)
- Requiem for flute, cello, organ and choir
- Herodes und Mariamne Opera in two acts according to the text of the tragedy by Friedrich Hebbel (1984)
