= 1911 in Spain =

- Decades: 1890s; 1900s; 1910s; 1920s; 1930s
- See also: History of Spain; Timeline of Spanish history; List of years in Spain

Events in the year 1911 in Spain.

== Incumbents ==
- Monarch: Alfonso XIII
- President of the Government: José Canalejas

== Births ==
- February 24 – Eduardo Vañó Pastor, cartoonist. (died 1993)
- July 8 - Vincente Gómez, guitarist and composer (died 2001)
- September 15 - José Muguerza, footballer (died 1980)
- November 7 - Ángeles Santos Torroella, painter (died 2013)

== Deaths ==
- April 9 - Manuel Aguirre de Tejada. (born 1827)
- June 7 - Carlos Fernández Shaw. (born 1865)
- July 4 - José Espasa Anguera. (born 1840)
