= 1922 in Spain =

- Decades: 1900s; 1910s; 1920s; 1930s; 1940s
- See also: Other events of 1922; List of years in Spain

Events in the year 1922 in Spain.

== Incumbents ==
- Monarch: Alfonso XIII
- President of the Council of Ministers:
  - until 8 March: Antonio Maura
  - 8 March-7 December: José Sánchez-Guerra y Martínez
  - starting 7 December: Manuel García Prieto

== Births ==
- 1 August – Cristóbal Martínez-Bordiú, 10th Marquis of Villaverde, aristocrat (died 1998)
- 26 December – José María Rodero, actor (died 1991).

== Deaths ==
- 22 January - Enrique Almaraz y Santos, Cardinal Archbishop of Seville (born 1847).
