= Fausto Olivares =

Spanish artist (1940–1995)

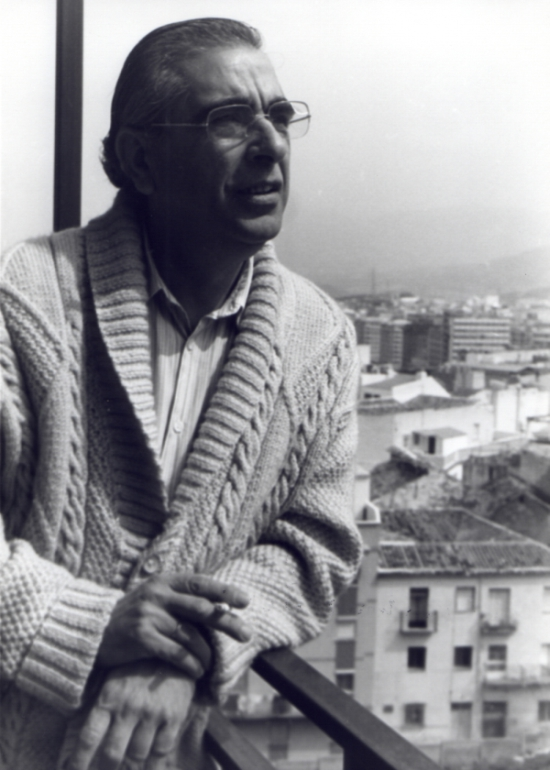
- Born: 5 November 1940; Jaén, Spain
- Died: 14 May 1995 (aged 54); Jaén, Spain
- Known for: Painting, Landscape art
- Movement: Neo-expressionism

Fausto Olivares Palacios (1940–1995) was an Andalusian painter born in Jaén. He studied Fine Arts in Madrid. He traveled to Paris and other cities in Europe before returning to Jaén in 1966, where he taught drawing and painting at the School of Arts and Crafts (now School of Art Joseph Nogué), where he served later as director.

In 1981 he left his teaching activity to pursue an artistic career that led him to exhibit in many cities in Spain and Europe.

With Françoise Gérardin, he had three sons: Fausto, Jaime and Efrén.

He died in his hometown in May 1995.

There is an Atelier-Museum Fausto Olivares in France. In 2010, on the occasion of the 70th anniversary of her husband's birth, Françoise Gérardin published a work in French: Evocations, my husband, Fausto Olivares, painter.

== His life ==
=== Early years ===
Fausto Olivares Cózar and Sérvula Palacios Cózar lived in the Magdalena district of Jaén, during the end of the Spanish Civil War. They lost their first daughter, Flor, just a few months old. Then Fausto (1940), Jose, Francisco, Ceferino, Maribel, Domingo Jesús, Pedro and Maria Florencia were born. Despite the difficult times of the post-Franco period, the family tried to give every child a proper education.

From his childhood, Fausto showed clear artistic predispositions, and concretized his skills by learning from the hand of D. Enrique Barrios, and later in the company of Francisco Cerezo Moreno. During his teenage years, he alternated working hours with his father and his brothers with drawing and painting classes. At the same time, he made some works that allowed him to reach already a little notoriety in the city.

He prepared the entrance examination at the Escuela Superior de Bellas Artes de San Fernando in Madrid, with Don Pablo Martín del Castillo, and at the age of 18, he left for the Spanish capital. At the School of Fine Arts, he had for companions Dario Villalba, Ángel Estrada, Isidro López Murias. His friend Luis Santiago, a musician, gave him the opportunity to meet flamenco artists like Pepe el de la Matrona, Lola Flores, Antonio Mairena ... Flamenco would later mark an important aspect in the life and work of the artist. painter. He took advantage of summer vacation periods to travel in Spain (León, Galicia), France (harvest) and Europe (Belgium, Netherlands, Germany), but also during the last years of studies while doing his military service in the Canary Islands.

During all his travels, he made sketches, paintings and even organised an exhibition during his military service.

=== Return to Jaén ===
Once his studies were over, he travelled again to France, and especially to Paris, where three of his brothers lived and worked. He met his future wife Françoise Gérardin. He had as a friend Alfredo Vila Monasterio, with whom he discovered certain modalities of abstract art. After a new trip to Europe, he returned to Jaén to settle there almost definitively, first as a modeling teacher, then as a teacher of drawing and painting at the School of Arts and Crafts.

He tries to combine his passions: painting, photography, flamenco and travels. He makes frequent trips to France, exhibits in England, and at the same time deepens his expression with expeditions throughout Andalusia. With Antonio Povedano Bermúdez and others, he takes part in a monographic exhibition: El Flamenco en el Arte Actual, which travels the country for years.

He was appointed director of the School of Arts and Crafts (1978), a charge he will be responsible for four years, before applying for layoff to be fully dedicated to painting.

=== New travels ===
From 1983, he moved his studio to the coasts of Malaga, where his painting took new lights, then to the Vosges for family reasons. These trips led him to multiply solo exhibitions in Andalusia and in the north of France: museums and galleries interested in the style of this Andalusian painter, whose deep expressiveness contrasted with the traditional reserve of the Nordic regions.

The illness surprised him while he was working on illustrations for a book of poems by Ramon Porras, Arco del Consuelo. After Holy Week of 1995, Fausto died at his home in Jaén the night of 13 May.

== His work ==
Fausto Olivares' style, from the moment he reached his own autonomy, is part of the movement known in Europe as figurative neo-expressionism.

Most of his work is done in oil on canvas or on wood. He also executed a large number of pen, coal, and pencil drawings, among which stand out his portraits of artists, who "were born from the pencil of Fausto, above all, to serve as a testimony and relic of an evening Flamenco enthusiasm".

=== Analysis ===
Manuel Kayser Zapata illustrates as follows the trajectory of Fausto: "His aesthetic evolution was very coherent, at the beginning of his singular creative necessity he let himself be impregnated by the avant-garde movements that struggled to win He had many exhibitions in Madrid during the time of his formation, Fausto felt that he was a child of his time, and as such he was aware of his responsibility, and later on his aesthetics would be exclusively for his own internal communication needs."

=== Fausto Olivares and the Flamenco ===
Ramón Porras writes: "The name Flamenco expressionism can be confusing: it is not an art that reflects the literality of the moods, characters or anecdotes of the flamenco world, but a deeply flamenco art in itself. To put it another way, Fausto does not paint La Soleá, but his painting sings by soleá."

== Chronology ==
This chronology incorporates the dates of the life and the work of Fausto Olivares.

=== 1940–1994 ===
- 1940 Fausto Olivares is born on 5 November in Jaén, San Miguel street.
- School of D. Manuel Moya.
- At a very young age, he began drawing and began his apprenticeship with D. Enrique Barrios. Later, with Francisco Cerezo, he began painting. He works during the day in his father's company and in the afternoon he attends classes at the School of Arts and Crafts. D. Pablo Martín del Castillo prepares him for the entrance of the School of Fine Arts.
- 1959 He joined the School of Fine Arts in San Fernando, Madrid, with the help of a grant allocated by the Ministry of Education.
- 1961 He travels in Europe.
- 1964 Solo exhibition. Salons of the Provincial Council of León.
- 1965 He travels to Paris.
- Solo exhibition. Salons du Real New Club. Santa Cruz de La Palma. Canaries.
- Collective exhibition. Salons of the Royal Economic Society of Jaén.
- 1966 Marriage with Françoise Gérardin.
- Birth of his first son, Fausto.
- Collective exhibition. « Grupo Jaén » (Jaén Group). Ciudad Real.
- 1967 Collective exhibition. « Grupo Jaén ». Room of the Artistic Center. Grenade.
- 1968 Birth of his second son, Jaime.
- Collective exhibition. « Grupo Jaén ». Salons of the Económica. Jaén.
- 1969 Collective exhibition. « Grupo Jaén ». Cordoba Savings Bank.
- Collective exhibition. "Six artists from Jaén". Salons of the Económica. Jaén.
- Solo exhibition. Salons of the Royal Economic Society of Friends of the Country. Jaén.
- Solo exhibition. Salons of the Savings Bank of Salamanca. Valladolid.
- 1970 He becomes by external competition the professor of drawing of the School of Arts and Crafts.
- Solo exhibition. Altamira Gallery. Cordoba.
- 1971 Birth of his third son, Efrén.
- Founding member of the Peña Flamenca in Jaén.
- Solo exhibition. Ronda Savings Bank. Málaga.
- Solo exhibition. Salons of the Royal Economic Society of Friends of the Country. Jaén.
- 1972 Solo exhibition. Salamanca Savings Bank. Valladolid.
- Solo exhibition. Salons of the Royal Economic Society of Friends of the Country. Jaén.
- Solo exhibition. Xiner Gallery. Valence.
- Collective exhibition. National Exhibition of Contemporary Art. Madrid.
- Collective exhibition. "Flamenco in today's art" (First monography). Montilla. Cordoba.
- Collective exhibition. "Five painters from Jaén". Braulio Gallery. Valence.
- 1973 He travels to United-Kingdom.
- Solo exhibition. Salons of the Royal Economic Society of Friends of the Country. Jaén.
- Solo exhibition. "Small format. Contemporary Spanish Painting". Atrium Gallery. Cordoba.
- 1974 He travels to Switzerland, to Austria and to Germany with Francisco Cerezo.
- Solo exhibition. Ansdell Galery. Londres.
- Solo exhibition. Salons of the Royal Economic Society of Friends of the Country. Jaén.
- Collective exhibition. "Flamenco in today's art" (Second monography). Municipal Hall of Cordoba.
- Collective exhibition. Cinquantenaire des Arts du Bourbonnais exhibition. Vichy.
- Collective exhibition. « Art of Today ». Del Castillo Gallery. Jaén.
- Collective exhibition. Engraving Atelier. Salons of the Económica. Jaén.
- 1975 Solo exhibition. Del Castillo Gallery. Jaén.
- Collective exhibition. "Twelve artists from Jaén". Culture House. Jaén.
- 1976 Solo exhibition. Foro Gallery. Madrid.
- Solo exhibition. Mayor San Jerónimo High School. Grenade.
- Collective exhibition. "Expressionism". Atrium Gallery. Cordoba.
- Collective exhibition. "Flamenco in Today's Art" (Third monography). Club Urbis. Madrid.
- Collective exhibition. "Eleven artists of Jaén". Vandelvira Gallery. Jaén.
- Collective exhibition. Paintings and sculptures by artists from Cordoba and other regions. Céspedes Gallery. Cordoba.
- 1977 He participates in the creation of Flamenco CANDIL magazine.
- Solo exhibition. Caja de Ahorros de Cádiz. Cadix.
- Solo exhibition. Galerie del Castillo. Jaén.
- Solo exhibition. Galerie PLOM. Jerez de la Frontera. Cadix.
- 1978 Il est nommé directeur de la Escuela de Artes y Oficios de Jaén.
- 1979 Collective exhibition. « Cinq peintres de Jaén ». Caja Provincial de Ahorros. Almuñécar. Grenade.
- 1981 Il demande un congé sans solde et il abandonne la Direction de la Escuela de Artes y Oficios.
- Solo exhibition. Galerie Pizmar. Cordoue.
- Solo exhibition. Caja de Ahorros de Granada. Jaén.
- Collective exhibition. " Le Flamenco dans l’Art actuel " (4 a Monographie). Salle de la Banque de Bilbao. Madrid.
- Collective exhibition. " Hommage à Picasso ". Musée Provincial des Beaux-Arts. Jaén.
- Collective exhibition. " Petit format". Galerie Jabalcuz. Jaén.
- Collective exhibition. " Le Flamenco dans l’Art actuel " (5 a Monographie). Posada del Potro. Cordoue.
- Collective exhibition. Hommage à ANGELES ORTIZ. Musée Provincial des Beaux- Arts. Jaén.
- 1982 Son père meurt en janvier.
- Solo exhibition. Galerie Jabalcuz. Jaén.
- Collective exhibition. Artistes d’aujourd’hui. Galiarte. Madrid.
- Collective exhibition. " Le Flamenco dans l’Art actuel " (6 a Monographie). Escuela de Artes y Oficios. Almería.
- Collective exhibition. Hommage à MURILLO. Salle du Ministère de la Culture. Jaén.
- Collective exhibition. " Le Flamenco dans l’Art actuel" (7 a Monographie). Salle de la Caja de Ahorros. Ceuta.
- Collective exhibition. " Tres Pintores jondos jiennenses " (Manuel Angeles Ortiz, Antonio Povedano, Fausto Olivares). Salle de la Caja de Ahorros de Granada. Jaén.
- 1983 Il déménage son atelier à Torremolinos.
- Il s’intéresse au Carnaval de Cadix.
- Solo exhibition. Caja de Ahorros de Málaga. Málaga.
- Solo exhibition. Salle de la Banque de Bilbao. Marbella. Málaga.
- Collective exhibition. Printemps 83. Galerie Aldaba. Madrid.
- Collective exhibition. " 29 Peintres andalous contemporains ". Salle du Monte de Piedad y Caja de Ahorros de Córdoba. Madrid.
- Collective exhibition. " Le Flamenco dans l’Art actuel " (8 a Monographie). Diputación Provincial. Cadix.
- 9th Monography Jerez.
- 10th in Villamartín.
- 11th in Puerto de Santa María.
- Collective exhibition. "28 Peintres andalous contemporains ". Salle Cajasur. Marbella. Málaga.
- 1984 Collective exhibition. Hommage aux Arts Plastiques. Posada del Potro. Cordoue.
- 1985 He works in his studio at Buis-les-Baronnies, in the South of France.
- Solo exhibition. Salle Cajasur. Madrid.
- Solo exhibition. Galerie Arfirenze. Madrid.
- Solo exhibition. Salle " La General ". Jaén.
- Collective exhibition. Peintures et sculptures. Galerie Jabalcuz. Jaén.
- Collective exhibition. " 20 Peintres andalous contemporains ". Maison de la Culture de Torredonjimeno. Jaén.
- 1986 Solo exhibition. Musée Municipal de Saint-Dié-des-Vosges.
- Solo exhibition. Salle Mateo Inurria. Cordoue.
- Collective exhibition. " Nuestros fondos pictóricos ". Monte de Piedad. Cajasur. Madrid.
- Collective exhibition. " Académie, classicisme et nouvelles tendances dans le dessin de Jaén ". Galerie Jabalcuz. Jaén.
- 1987 He travels to Italy.
- Solo exhibition. Galerie Lillebonne. Nancy.
- Collective exhibition. "Le Flamenco dans l’Art actuel" (12 a Monographie). Club Urbis. Madrid.
- 1988 He works in his son Jaime Olivares' painting studio in Strasbourg.
- Solo exhibition Galerie Aktuaryus. Strasbourg.
- Solo exhibition. Musée Municipal d’Épernay.
- Collective exhibition. " Perspectives Œil 88 ". Espace Agora du C.A.C. Forbach. Collective exhibition. 1 an exposition de Peintres de Jaén. Nouvelle salle de la Real Sociedad Económica. Jaén.
- Collective exhibition. " Le Flamenco dans l’Art espagnol contemporain ". Palais de Pemartín. Jerez de la Frontera. Cadix
- 1989 He travels to Germany. Stays in Hambourg.
- 1990 Solo exhibition. Salle d’exposition de " La General ". Jaén.
- Solo exhibition. Salle Municipale de Marbella. Málaga.
- Collective exhibition. Galerie Aljaba. Jaén.
- Collective exhibition. "Peintres contemporains". Galerie J. Strasbourg.
- 1991 Solo exhibition. Galerie d’Art. Maison de la Culture de Metz.
- Solo exhibition. Salons de la Diputación Provincial. Jaén.
- Solo exhibition. Galerie J. Strasbourg.
- Collective exhibition. Galerie Contrast. Metz.
- Collective exhibition. Galerie Dmochowski. Paris.
- 1992 Solo exhibition. Galerie d’Art de l’Ancien Collège. Sézanne.
- Collective exhibition "Figures. 23 noms autour de la figure de Jacques CAL LOT ". Galerie Lillebonne. Nancy.
- 1993 Il met en scène Stabat Mater de Michel Bisson. Théâtre Universitaire de Strasbourg
- Solo exhibition. Galerie Ocre. Cordoue.
- Solo exhibition. Galerie du Musée Cruz Herrera. La Línea. Cadix.
- Solo exhibition. Salle Unicaja. Vélez. Málaga.
- Solo exhibition. Galerie H. Marbella. Málaga.
- Solo exhibition. Salle d’exposition de Correos. Torremolinos. Málaga.
- Solo exhibition. Maison de la Culture d’Antequera.
- 1994 Solo exhibition. Salle d’exposition " La General ". Jaén.

=== 1995–2011 ===
- 1995 Il meurt d’un cancer le 14 mai à son domicile, à Jaén.
- Collective exhibition : " Deux siècles de peinture et de sculpture de Jaén". Hôpital de San Juan de Dios. Jaén
- Solo exhibition. " Hommage à Fausto OLIVARES ". Musée Municipal de Saint-Dié-des-Vosges..
- 1996 Publication of the book Arco del Consuelo. Jaén. Poèmes de Ramón PORRAS. Dessins de Fausto OLIVARES.
- Solo exhibition. " Hommage posthume à Fausto OLIVARES ". Escuela de Artes Applicadas y Oficios Artísticos. Jaén.
- Solo exhibition. Peña Flamenca de Jaén. Jaén.
- Solo exhibition. " Hommage à Fausto OLIVARES ". Galerie Lillebonne. Nancy.
- Creation de la S.A.F.O, Société des Amis de Fausto OLIVARES.
- 1999 Solo exhibition. Fausto Olivares 1965–75. Cajasur. Cordoue
- Solo exhibition. Atelier Fausto Olivares. Hurbache
- 2000 Collective exhibition. Atelier Fausto Olivares. Hurbache
- 2001 Restauration et transformation de l’atelier d’ Hurbache en Atelier-Musée Fausto Olivares
- Collective exhibition. Atelier-Musée Fausto Olivares. Hurbache
- 2002 Creation of the Prize of Flamenco Painting "Fausto Olivares" by the Peña Flamenca de Jaén
- Collective exhibition: Abbaye des Prémontrés. Pont-à-Mousson
- Collective exhibition. Atelier-Musée Fausto Olivares. Hurbache
- en cours de rédaction

== Museums and collections ==
- Museum of Contemporary Art. Madrid.
- Jaén Provincial Museum.
- Musée Municipal de Saint-Die-des-Vosges.
- Higueras Jacinto Museum. Santisteban del Puerto. Jaén.
- Musée Municipal d'Épernay.
- Fund of the Provincial Council.
- Cajasur Fund. Cordoue.
- Financial Club of Genoa. Madrid.
- Jacqueline Logier Collection. Paris.
- Sangenis Collection. Salles-sous-Bois. France
- Unicaja Fund. Malaga.
- The General Fund. Granada.
- Private collections

== Tributes ==
- La Peña Flamenca de Jaén has created a contest: Drawing and Painting Contest Flamenco Fausto Olivares
- The exhibition hall of the School of Art Joseph Nogué has taken the name of Fausto Olivares Art Gallery
- A street in the city of Jaén is named Fausto Olivares Painter.
