= Miquel Asins Arbó =

Spanish composer

Miquel Asins Arbó (21 January 1916 – 26 October 1996) was a Spanish composer. He composed in a variety of genres but is particularly known for his popular songs in the Valencian music tradition and for the more than 70 sound tracks which he composed for Spanish films and television.

Asins Arbó was born in Barcelona but when he was a child moved with his family to Valencia where he studied composition at the Conservatory of Valencia under Manuel Palau. He served as the bandmaster of military regiments in Valencia and Madrid in 1944. In 1976 he was appointed to the chair of accompaniment at the Madrid Royal Conservatory, a post which he held until 1985. He died in at the age of 79 in Valencia where the Plaza Miguel Asins Arbó is named in his honour.

== Awards ==
- Premio Nacional de Música (1950)
- Premi Ciutat de Barcelona (1954)
- Premio SGAE (1990)
- Member of the Real Academia de Bellas Artes de San Carlos de Valencia (1980)
