= 1912 in Spain =

- Decades: 1890s; 1900s; 1910s; 1920s; 1930s
- See also: History of Spain; Timeline of Spanish history; List of years in Spain

Events in the year 1912 in Spain.

== Incumbents ==
- Monarch: Alfonso XIII
- President of the Government:
  - until 12 November: José Canalejas
  - 12 November-14 November: Manuel García Prieto
  - starting 14 November: Álvaro Figueroa Torres

== Events ==
- 12 November – José Canalejas, Prime Minister, is murdered in Madrid by an anarchist.
- 27 November – Spanish protectorate in Morocco: By a treaty with France, Spain is granted a zone of influence in northern and southern Morocco.
- Founding of FC L'Escala
- Founding of the Open de España golf tournament.

== Births ==
- 3 January – Federico Borrell García, Republican and anarchist militiaman (died 1936)
- 12 October – Dionisio Ridruejo, poet and political activist (died 1975)

== Deaths ==
- 19 May – Marcelino Menéndez y Pelayo, historian and critic (born 1856)
