= Statute of Autonomy of Ceuta =

Maximum legislative document of Ceuta, Spain

The Statute of Autonomy of Ceuta (Spanish: Estatuto de Autonomía de Ceuta) is the basic institutional norm of the autonomous city of Ceuta. It was approved by the Cortes Generales through Organic Law 1/1995 of March 13, published in the Boletín Oficial del Estado the following day. At the same time, the Statute of Autonomy of Melilla was also approved.

== Process ==
The Spanish Constitution of 1978 establishes in its Fifth Transitory Provision:

The cities of Ceuta and Melilla may constitute autonomous communities if so decided by their respective town halls by agreement adopted by the absolute majority of its members and so authorized by the Cortes Generales, by an organic law, in the terms provided in Article 144.

In turn, Article 144 establishes:

The Cortes Generales, through an Organic Law, may, for reasons of national interest:

1. Authorize the constitution of an Autonomous Community when its territorial scope does not exceed that of a province and does not meet the conditions of section 1 of article 143. 2. Authorize or agree, as the case may be, a Statute of Autonomy for territories that are not integrated in the provincial organization.

3. Replace the initiative of the local Corporations referred to in section 2 of article 143.

Since 1981, the recognition of autonomy had previously been sought on several occasions without reaching a consensus of the various political forces in its formulation, what originated in the city the appearance of diverse protest platforms that urged the political class for its treatment, which finally took place within the framework of the Autonomous Agreements between PP and PSOE of 1992. The main point of dissension originated in the treatment of the political regime, by which one of the parties wished to give it a status similar to that of an autonomy but not equal, while the other desired that, as an integral part of the Spanish Nation and according to the aforementioned Fifth Transitory Provision, full autonomy will be granted. Finally, the consensus came through the figure of the Autonomous City.

== Reaction in Morocco ==
The Moroccan government considers that Ceuta and Melilla, as well as the Plazas de Soberanía located on the North African coast, are occupied territory that must be reintegrated. The statute of Autonomy of Ceuta establishes in its preliminary title that Ceuta is an integral and indissoluble part of the Spanish Nation, which rejects any consideration of the Moroccan claims.

Both in the framework of its project and in its approval, there were several protests by the Moroccan executive, as well as other political leaders of the country, that calmed down by the end of 1995.

== Later reforms ==
Since 2005 there is a project to reform the statute, which among its main objectives has to be called finally an autonomous community and acquire greater powers, limited in its regime due to its special nature.
