= Álex Rey =

Spanish footballer

Personal information
- Full name: Alejandro Rey Lugilde
- Date of birth: 29 January 1998 (age 28)
- Place of birth: Lugo, Spain
- Height: 1.67 m (5 ft 6 in)
- Position: Midfielder

Team information
- Current team: Boiro

Youth career
- Deportivo La Coruña
- 2013–2017: Celta

Senior career*
Years	Team	Apps	(Gls)
2017–2018	Celta B	0	(0)
2017–2018	→ Somozas (loan)	32	(1)
2018–2020	Polvorín	50	(5)
2019–2021	Lugo	3	(0)
2020–2021	→ Unionistas (loan)	23	(1)
2021–2022	Tarazona	20	(0)
2022–2023	Barco	29	(4)
2023	UD Ourense	10	(0)
2024	Villalonga		
2024–	Boiro	6	(0)
- * Club domestic league appearances and goals as of 13 October 2024

Alejandro "Álex" Rey Lugilde (born 29 January 1998) is a Spanish footballer who plays for Boiro as a central midfielder.

== Club career ==
Born in Lugo, Galicia, Rey represented Deportivo de La Coruña and RC Celta de Vigo as a youth. On 8 August 2017, after finishing his formation, he was loaned to Tercera División side UD Somozas for one year.

Rey made his senior debut on 20 August 2017, playing the last 20 minutes in a 5–0 home routing of CD Arenteiro. He scored his first goal on 15 October, netting the opener in a 2–0 away defeat of CD Cultural Areas, and finished the campaign as a regular starter.

On 31 August 2018, Rey joined CD Lugo and was assigned to the farm team also in the fourth division. He made his first team debut the following 14 April, coming on as a late substitute for Josete in a 4–0 routing at Córdoba CF in the Segunda División.

On 15 September 2020, Rey was loaned to Segunda División B side Unionistas de Salamanca CF for the 2020–21 season.

== Personal life ==
Rey's older brother Javier is also a footballer. A winger, both play together at Polvorín.
