= María del Carmen Martínez Sancho =

First woman in Spain to gain a PhD in Mathematics

Carmen Martínez Sancho
- Born: 8 July 1901; Toledo, Spain
- Died: 15 October 1995 (aged 94); Malaga, Spain
- Education: Central University of Madrid

María del Carmen Martínez Sancho (8 July 1901 in Toledo – 15 October 1995 in Malaga) was the first woman in Spain to gain a PhD in Mathematics. She was the first Professor of Mathematics to work in secondary school education in Spain, and the first woman to be appointed to the Board of Extension of Studies at the University of Berlin. She was part of Madrid and Seville's Instituto-Escuela.

== Early life and education ==
Martínez was born on 8 July 1901 in Toledo. She was the second of six children in the family of José Martínez and Emilia Sancho. Her father was an engineer and public worker, which resulted in the family living in several Spanish cities before they settled in Madrid. Her father was keen for his children to receive their education at the Institución Libre de Enseñanza. He believed that boys and girls should have the same education, and supported her to complete high school classes at the University of Alcalá's Cardenal Cisneros Associated School. Here she became interested in mathematics and literature, and her parents encouraged her toward mathematics. Martínez herself was unhappy with the school: all students scored highly and there were no clear criteria for success. She finished her high school studies on 1 July 1918.

In 1918 she began to study in sciences the Central University of Madrid. In the first year of her degree, she was taught by extraordinary teachers, including Cecilio Jiménez Rueda and Julio Rey Pastor. Throughout her career, her greatest influence would be Julio Rey Pastor who taught her Mathematical Analysis. Carmen was a prestigious student since she got the highest marks in the year. Whist still an undergraduate student she was asked to teach at the Instituto-Escuela of Madrid where her younger siblings studied. She gave classes simultaneously with her university studies. She graduated on 7 December 1926.

She began her doctorate studies under the supervision of José María Plans y Freyre who was the first person to introduce relativity to Spain. Her thesis was titled: The concept of function, continuous and semicontinuous functions, and their properties. She was awarded the Extraordinary Price of Doctorate for her doctoral thesis and became the first Spanish woman to earn a PhD in mathematics.

== Career ==
In 1928 Martínez was appointed Professor of Mathematics in the High-School Institute of Ferrol (La Coruña). She would go on to become a teacher of the El Instituto Femenino Infanta Beatriz with her colleague Carmen Vielva Otorel.

=== Germany ===
On 4 November 1930 the Board of Extension of Studies granted her an eight-month grant to move to Germany to continue her studies on Multidimensional Geometry. She attended classes given by Kurt Hensel at the University of Berlin. She extended her grant for two extra months, eventually finishing her work on 2 September 1932. She presented a memorial project that detailed Hammerstein's and Bieberbach's classes.

=== Seville ===
Immediately after returning to Spain from Germany, Martínez began to teach at Instituto-Escuela. She describes the time in Seville as one of the highlights of her career. Whilst in Seville she met Alberto Meléndez, who would become her husband and father of her child, Alberto Meléndez Martínez.

Martínez moved to the Murillo Institute. She taught the first, third and fifth grade in 1938 and was promoted to Professor in 1939. Martínez organised a campaign within the Institute to build a canteen to provide food for disadvantaged students. Her campaign suffered due to the rise of Francoism. Her high school colleague Patricio Peñalver Bachiller, Professor and Dean in the Faculty of Sciences of the University of Seville, encouraged her to apply for faculty position. She was appointed a Professor of Mathematics in 1957.

=== Return to Madrid ===
Martínez retired from the Murillo Institute in 1974, returned to Madrid and taught mathematics in the Jesús María School of Vallecas. Again she made efforts to engage students of low socioeconomic status.

=== Recognition ===
As an acknowledgement to her teaching labour, Seville's town hall named one of their streets of the Santa Justa district in her honour.
