= Statute of Autonomy of Melilla =

1995 law establishing Melilla as an autonomous city of Spain

The Statute of Autonomy of Melilla (Spanish: Estatuto de Autonomía de Melilla) is the basic institutional norm of the autonomous city of Melilla, in Spain. It is an organic law approved on 13 March 1995 and published in the Official State Gazette (Boletín Oficial del Estado) the following day, together with the equivalent of the city of Ceuta. It established Melilla as an autonomous city, because before it was a municipality belonging to the province of Málaga. It was the result of a 17-year process that originated from the Fifth Transitory Provision of the Constitution of 1978 that allowed the subsequent constitution of Ceuta and Melilla in autonomous communities.

== Bibliography ==
- Huete García, Agustín; Díaz Velázquez, Eduardo; Sola Bautista, Antonio (2011). CERMI (ed.). Situación y necesidades de las personas con discapacidad en las Ciudades Autónomas de Ceuta y Melilla. Informe 2010 (pdf). p. 150.
- Márquez Cruz, Guillermo (2003). Institut de Ciències Polítiques i Socials (Barcelona, Catalunya) (ed.). La Formación de gobierno y la práctica coalicional en las ciudades autónomas de Ceuta y Melilla (1979-2007) (PDF). p. 95. ISSN 1133-8962.
