= 1899 in Spain =

- Decades: 1870s; 1880s; 1890s; 1900s; 1910s
- See also: History of Spain; Timeline of Spanish history; List of years in Spain

Events in the year 1899 in Spain.

== Incumbents ==
- Monarch — Alfonso XIII, Maria Christina of Austria (Queen regent)
- Prime Minister — Práxedes Mateo Sagasta until 7 March, then Francisco Silvela

== Events ==
- 12 February – The majority of the Kingdom of Spain's remaining territories in the Pacific are sold to the German Empire through the German–Spanish Treaty.
- 16 & 30 April – The 1899 Spanish general election is held.
- 3 May – Francisco Silvela becomes the new Prime Minister of Spain after the resignation on March 7 of Práxedes Sagasta in the wake of Spain's loss of its overseas territories during the Spanish-American War.
- 22 September – Following a court-martial, Admiral Patricio Montojo, who had surrendered the Philippines to the U.S. to end the Spanish–American War, is relieved of all commands and placed on the reserve list.

== Births ==
- 18 January – Domingo Sánchez, wrestler (died 1961)
- 28 January – Luis de Urquijo, 2nd Marquess of Bolarque, diplomat and businessman (died 1975)
- 29 January – Ángel García Hernández, soldier (died 1930)
- 30 January – Manuel Quiroga, composer (died 1988)
- 5 February – Julián Zugazagoitia, journalist and politician (died 1940)
- 8 February – Camilo Menéndez Tolosa, army general (died 1971)
- 19 February – Josep Tarradellas, first president of Catalonia (died 1988)
- 4 March – Emilio Prados, author (died 1962 in Mexico)
- 5 May – Cèlia Suñol i Pla, author (died 1986)
- 11 May – Paulino Masip, author (died 1963 in Mexico)
- 17 May – Carmen de Icaza, 8th Baroness of Claret, author (died 1979)
- 26 May – Avelino Cachafeiro, musician (died 1972)
- 30 May – Bernabé López Calle, anarchist militant (died 1949)
- 4 June – Juan Cazador, poet and artist (died 1956)
- 19 June – Maria Carratalà i Van den Wouver, musician (died 1984)
- 9 July – Cirilo Cánovas, politician (died 1973)
- 2 August – Ernesto Giménez Caballero, author and politician (died 1988)
- 27 August – Eduardo Torroja, engineer (died 1961)
- 2 September – Luis Pericot Garcia, archaeologist and historian (died 1978)
- 25 September – Ricard Lamote de Grignon, composer and conductor (died 1962)
- 4 October – Fermín Galán, soldier (died 1930)
- 9 October – Francisco Casanovas, musician (died 1986)
- 11 October – Mariano Alonso Alonso, military officer (died 1974)
- 9 November – Francisco Reiguera, actor (died 1969 in Mexico)
- 15 November – Leopoldo Querol, pianist (died 1985)
- 18 November – Luis González de Ubieta, naval admiral (died 1950)
- 7 December – José Bullejos, politician (died 1974 in Mexico)
- 11 December – Victorina Durán, artist (died 1993)
- 15 December – Eusebia Palomino Yenes, nun (died 1935)
- 28 December – Edgar Neville, author and director (died 1976)

== Deaths ==
- 2 January – Francisco de Cubas, architect and politician (born 1826)
- 4 June – José de Carvajal y Hué, economist and politician (born 1835)
- 6 August – Isabel Cheix, author (born 1839)
- 9 November – María del Carmen González-Ramos García-Prieto de Muñoz, nun (born 1834)
- 1 December – Dolores Cabrera y Heredia, author (born 1828)
- 2 December – Segismundo Bermejo y Merelo, naval officer (born 1832)
- 3 December – Antonio María Fabié, politician (born 1832)
- 18 December – Francesc Xavier Butinyà i Hospital, missionary (born 1834)
