= 1900 in Spain =

- Decades: 1880s; 1890s; 1900s; 1910s; 1920s
- See also: History of Spain; Timeline of Spanish history; List of years in Spain

Events in the year 1900 in Spain.

== Incumbents ==
- Monarch: Alfonso XIII, Maria Christina of Austria (Queen regent)
- Prime Minister: Francisco Silvela (until 22 October), Marcelo Azcárraga (from 23 October)

== Events ==
- 31 March — The Ministry of Education is created via a budget act as the Ministry of Public Instruction and Fine Arts.
- May – Two spiritualist newspapers, La Luz del Porvenir and Unión Espiritista Kardecista de Cataluña merge to form the paper Luz y unión.
- 14 May to 28 October – Spain competes at the modern Olympic Games for the first time at the 1900 Summer Olympics in Paris.
- 27 June – Representatives of the Kingdom of Spain and the French Third Republic sign the Treaty of Paris negotiating their colonial borders in Africa.
- 29 June – The Plaza de las Arenas opens in Barcelona.
- 31 July – Biscay Foral Delegation Palace is inaugurated in Bilbao.
- 13 October – The anarchist trade union center, Federation of Workers' Societies of the Spanish Region (FSORE), is founded.
- 28 October – Sergeant Cesáreo García leads a failed insurrection in Badalona called the Carlist Sublevation.
- 7 November – The Treaty of Washington is signed, clarifying the Spanish Empire's cession of the Philippines as agreed by the 1898 Treaty of Paris.
- 11 November – The Catalan Football Federation is founded as the first football association in Spain.

Undated

- Construction of Casa Calvet is completed and Gaudí's design wins the Concurso anual de edificios artísticos from the Barcelona government.
- The Banco Hispano Americano is formed.

== Births ==
- 1 January
  - María Rosa Urraca Pastor, politician (died 1984)
  - Xavier Cugat, musician (died 1990)
- 16 January – Juan López Sánchez, politician (died 1972)
- 21 January – Fernando Quiroga Palacios, Cardinal (died 1971)
- 24 February – Francisco Madrid, journalist and author (died 1952 in Argentina)
- 19 March
  - Carmen Carbonell, actress (died 1988)
  - Josep Dencàs, politician (died 1966 in Morocco)
- 20 March – María Moliner, librarian and lexicographer (died 1981)
- 31 March – Amadeo Marco Ilincheta, politician (died 1987)
- 4 April — María del Rosario de Silva, Duchess of Alba, socialite (died 1934)
- 20 April – José Lino Vaamonde, architect (died 1986 in Venezuela)
- 29 April – Concha de Albornoz, feminist (died 1972 in Mexico)
- 16 May – Ángel Valbuena Prat, historian (died 1977)
- 11 June – Carmen Polo, wife of Francisco Franco (died 1988)
- 14 June – Eugenio Imaz, philosopher and translator (died 1951 in Mexico)
- 12 July – Manuel Antonio, poet (died 1930)
- 6 August – Josep Tomàs i Piera, politician (died 1976 in Mexico)
- 27 August – Guillermo de Torre, author (died 1971 in Argentina)
- 10 September – Juan Chabás, author (died 1954 in Cuba)
- 15 September – Paquita Madriguera, musician (died 1965 in Uruguay)
- 20 October – Rodolfo Halffter, composer (died 1987 in Mexico)
- 4 November – Juan Dotras Vila, composer (died 1978)
- 7 November – José Crespo, actor (died 1997)
- 12 November – José Maldonado González, politician (died 1985)
- 15 November – Marciano José, Martyr of Turon and canonized saint (died 1934)
- 18 November – José María Valiente Soriano, politician (died 1982)
- 26 December – José Gaos, philosopher (died 1969 in Mexico)
- 27 December – Juan de Orduña, director and actor (died 1974)

== Deaths ==
- 4 January – Francisco Merry y Colom, diplomat (born 1829)
- 11 February – Jorge Loring, 1st Marquis of Casa Loring, businessman (born 1822)
- 23 March – Lorenzo Casanova, painter (born 1844)
- 23 September – Arsenio Martínez Campos, Prime Minister of Spain (born 1831)
- 24 November – Rafael Monleón, painter (born 1843)
