= 1976 in Spain =

- Decades: 1950s; 1960s; 1970s; 1980s; 1990s
- See also: Other events of 1976; List of years in Spain

Events in the year 1976 in Spain.

== Incumbents ==
- Monarch – Juan Carlos I
- Prime minister – Carlos Arias Navarro, until 1 July
- Prime minister – Adolfo Suárez, from 5 July

== Events ==
- 9 January – The Ministry of Development Planning is dissolved.
- 28 February – The Spanish government relinquishes control of the Spanish Sahara, the final colony of the Spanish Empire.
- 16 February – The Barcelona Convention is adopted, aiming to reduce pollution in the Mediterranean Sea.
- 3 March – 150 people are injured and 5 die following a police shooting at a church in Vitoria-Gasteiz during the Vitoria massacre.
- 5 April – 29 political prisoners escape in the Segovia prison break.
- 4 May – The daily newspaper El País is published for the first time.
- 9 May
  - Imperial Iranian Air Force Flight 48 crashes on its approach to Madrid.
  - Two are killed in the Montejurra massacre in Navarre.
- 1 July – Prime minister Carlos Arias Navarro is forced to resign following pressure from Juan Carlos I.
- 5 July – Adolfo Suárez becomes the new prime minister, ending the Second government of Carlos Arias Navarro.
- 8 July – The first government of Adolfo Suárez is formed.
- 4 October – 5 people die during the Assassination of Juan María de Araluce Villar, part of the ongoing Basque conflict.
- 15 December – 97.4% of the population votes in favor of The Political Reform Act through the 1976 Spanish political reform referendum.

== Births ==
- 2 January – Paz Vega, actor
- 12 January – La Shica, musician
- 20 January – David DeMaría, musician
- 3 February – Rocío Orsi, philosopher (died 2014)
- 17 February – Daniel Grao, actor
- 18 February – Házael González, author
- 20 February – Raulo Cáceres, comic artist
- 2 March – Emmanuel Esparza, actor
- 9 March – Carmen Montón, politician
- 12 March – María Adánez, actor
- 1 April – Emma Ríos, comic artist
- 14 April – Santiago Abascal, politician
- 17 May – Mayte Martínez, athlete
- 30 May – Alejandro Fernández (politician), politician
- 2 June – Blanca Romero, actor
- 17 June – Carolina Pascual, gymnast
- 18 June – Irene Montalà, actor
- 20 June – Alícia Romero, politician
- 21 June – Ivó Giner, golfer
- 24 June – David Bagration of Mukhrani, disputed Head of the Royal House of Georgia
- 3 July – Laura Vilagrà, politician
- 8 July – Maider Etxebarria, politician
- 18 July – Elsa Pataky, model and actor
- 22 July – José María Espejo-Saavedra Conesa, politician
- 25 July – Unai Hualde, politician
- 10 August – Pablo Derqui, actor
- 19 August – Elsa Artadi, politicians
- 25 August – Susana Seivane, musician
- 26 August – Amaia Montero, musician
- 4 September – Iván Massagué, actor
- 16 September – Mónica Carrillo, journalist
- 19 October – Xabier Fernández, sailor
- 20 October – Patricia Rueda Perello, politician
- 26 October – Jordi Solé i Ferrando, politician
- 10 December – Álvaro Benito, footballer and musician
- 17 December – Roger Casamajor, actor
- 27 December – Asier Antona Gómez, politician

== Deaths ==
- 6 January – Óscar Esplá, composer (born 1886)
- 17 February – Clementina Arderiu, poet (born 1889)
- 30 June – Federico Romero, poet (born 1886)
- 13 July – Jesús Rubio García-Mina, politician (born 1908)
- 2 August – Cecilia, musician (born 1948)
- 26 August – Tomás Borrás, author (born 1891)
- 22 October – Alejandro Rodríguez de Valcárcel, politician (born 1917)
- 16 November – Antonio Arrúe Zarauz, politician (born 1903)
- 25 November – Fernando María Castiella, politician (born 1907)
- 4 December – Pepe Marchena, flamenco singer (born 1903)

== See also ==
- 1976 in Spanish television
- List of Spanish films of 1976
- List of Spanish number-one singles in 1976
