= 1991 in Spain =

- Decades: 1970s; 1980s; 1990s; 2000s; 2010s
- See also: History of Spain; Timeline of Spanish history; List of years in Spain

Events in the year 1991 in Spain.

== Incumbents ==
- Monarch – Juan Carlos I
- Prime Minister of Spain – Felipe González Márquez

== Events ==
- 26 May – 1991 Spanish local elections are held, to elect 66,308 councillors in the 8,060 municipalities of Spain and 1,032 seats in 38 provincial deputations.

== Popular culture ==
=== Music ===
- Spain, represented by Sergio Dalma, finishes 4th in the Eurovision Song Contest with 119 points.

=== Film ===
- See List of Spanish films of 1991

=== Television ===
- The comedy series, Farmacia de guardia, is launched.

=== Literature ===
- El caballero de Sajonia by Juan Benet Goitia

== Notable births ==
- 9 January – Álvaro Soler, singer
- 21 January – Javier Calvo, actor and director
- 6 February – Maxi Iglesias, actor and model
- 8 April – Ariadna Chueca Moreno, basketball referee
- 11 April – Thiago Alcântara, footballer
- 15 April – Javier Fernandez, figure skater
- 10 June – Pol Espargaró, motorcycle racer
- 1 July – Lucas Vázquez, footballer
- 24 September – Oriol Romeu, footballer
- 13 October – Diego Domínguez, Spanish actor and singer

== Notable deaths ==
- 5 February – Pedro Arrupe, priest (born 1907)
- 6 February – María Zambrano, essayist and philosopher (born 1904)
- 4 May — Luis Rodríguez Zúñiga, Spanish sociologist (born 1942)
