= 1992 in Spain =

- Decades: 1970s; 1980s; 1990s; 2000s; 2010s
- See also: Other events of 1992; List of years in Spain

Events in the year 1992 in Spain.

== Incumbents ==
- Monarch – Juan Carlos I
- Prime Minister of Spain – Felipe González Márquez

== Events ==
- 1 January
  - The year of Madrid as European Capital of Culture year begins.
  - The year of the celebrations for the Columbus Quincentenary begins.
- 6 February
  - A car bombing in Madrid kills 5 people and injuries a further 7.
- 13 March
  - The 7th Goya Awards are held at the Palacio de Congresos de Madrid.
- 15 March
  - A regional election is held in Catalonia to elect the 4th Parliament of the autonomous community.
- 14 April
  - The Madrid–Seville high-speed rail line, the first high-speed rail in Spain, is inaugurated.
- 20 April
  - Seville Expo '92, a six-month universal exhibition, opens in Seville.
- 21 April
  - Commercial AVE high-speed rail service operated by Renfe begins between Madrid and Seville.
- 27 April–17 May
  - The 1992 Vuelta a España is held between Jerez de la Frontera and Madrid and Tony Rominger wins the race.
- 9 May
  - "Todo esto es la música" performed by Serafín Zubiri representing Spain at the Eurovision Song Contest 1992 finishes 14th with 37 points.
- 20 May
  - FC Barcelona wins the European Cup final at Wembley Stadium, in London. It is the first time the club has won the trophy; they achieved it with a 1–0 win in extra time over Italian champions Sampdoria, with Ronald Koeman scoring the only goal of the game.
- 7 June
  - The 1991–92 La Liga season ends, with FC Barcelona as the winner.
- 27 June
  - The 1992 Copa del Rey final is held at the Santiago Bernabéu Stadium in Madrid with Atlético Madrid winning the cup after beating Real Madrid CF.
- 17–19 July
  - The 1992 Ibero-American Championships in Athletics are held at the Estadio Olímpico de La Cartuja in Seville.
- 23–24 July
  - The 2nd Ibero-American Summit is held in Madrid.
- 25 July
  - The 1992 Summer Olympics are inaugurated with an opening ceremony at the Estadi Olímpic de Montjuïc in Barcelona.
- 9 August
  - The 1992 Summer Olympics ended with a closing ceremony at the Estadi Olímpic de Montjuïc in Barcelona. The Spanish team at the games had won twenty-two medals (thirteen gold, seven silver, and two bronze).
- 29 August–2 September
  - The 1992 UCI Track Cycling World Championships are held in Valencia.
- 3 September–14 September
  - The 1992 Summer Paralympics are held in Barcelona. The Spanish team at the games wins 120 medals (39 gold, 32 silver, and 49 bronze).
- 12 October
  - The Seville Expo '92 closes after receiving more than 41 million visitors.
- 5–8 November
  - The 1992 World Cup (men's golf) is held at the Real Club La Moraleja in Madrid.
- 19–22 November
  - The 1992 World Karate Championships are held in Granada.
- 3 December
  - The Aegean Sea tanker oil spill occurred in A Coruña.
- 5 December
  - The OTI Festival 1992 is held at the Teatro Principal in Valencia. "A dónde voy sin ti" performed by Francisco representing Spain wins the festival.

== Popular culture ==
=== Film ===
- See List of Spanish films of 1992

=== Television ===
- Television series, La granja ends.

=== Literature ===
- Corazón tan blanco (A Heart So White) by Javier Marías ISBN 0811215059

== Notable births ==
- 1 January - Iván Balliu, footballer
- 3 January – Jon Aurtenetxe, footballer
- 8 January – Koke, footballer
- 11 January – Daniel Carvajal, footballer
- 12 January – Sergio Juste Marín, footballer
- 23 January – Sergio Álvarez Díaz, footballer
- 5 February – Cristóbal Gil Martín, footballer
- 12 February - Edgar Badia, footballer
- 13 February – Kevin Lacruz, footballer
- 10 March – Pablo Espinosa, actor, singer, and musician
- 16 March – Albert Dalmau, footballer
- 20 March – Lara Arruabarrena-Vecino, tennis player
- 21 March – Jordi Amat, footballer
- 27 March – Julián Luque Conde, footballer
- 28 March – Sergi Gómez, footballer
- 21 April – Isco, footballer
- 11 May – Pablo Sarabia, footballer
- 17 June – Adrián Cañas, footballer
- 29 June – Aitor Casas Luceño, footballer
- 3 July - Nathalia Ramos, actress and singer
- 5 July - Alberto Moreno, footballer
- 7 July – Víctor Arteaga, basketball player
- 18 August - Néstor Albiach, football player
- 25 August – Borja González, footballer
- 19 September – Javier Espinosa, footballer
- 15 October – Alejandro Fernández Iglesias, footballer
- 3 November – Sara Hurtado, ice dancer
- 18 November - Asier Barahona, footballer
- 14 December - Marina Agoues, footballer
- 17 December - Abdón Prats, footballer

== Notable deaths ==
- 18 March – Antonio Molina, singer (born 1928)
- 2 April - Juanito, footballer (born 1954; road accident)
- 26 April - Luis Rosales, poet and essayist (born 1910)
- 2 July - Camarón de la Isla, flamenco singer (born 1950)
- 21 August - Isidro Lángara, football player and manager (born 1912)
- 25 September - César Manrique, artist, sculptor, architect and activist (born 1919).
- 4 November - José Luis Sáenz de Heredia, film director (born 1911)
