= 1975 in Spanish television =

This is a list of Spanish television related events in 1975.

== Events ==
- 20 November: News of the death of Francisco Franco is aired in full color in TVE.
- 19 December: Gabriel Peña Aranda is appointed Director General of RTVE.
- TVE broadcasts 1.143 hours in colour versus 4.205 in Black and white.

== Debuts ==
Original Title	Channel	Debut	Performer / Hosts	Genre
3 Programa 3	La 1	1975-02-22		Music
A simple vista	La 1	1975-02-12	Leo Anchóriz	Quiz Show
Aquí y ahora	La 1	1975-04-05	José Luis Uribarri	Variety Show
Canciones del desván	La 1	1975-11-02	María del Carmen Goñi	Children
Directísimo]	La 1	1975-04-05	José María Íñigo	Variety Show
El campo	La 1	1975-03-09	María Luisa Clemente	News
El mundo de la TV	La 1	1975-08-30	Isabel Bauzá	Variety Show
El mundo de la música	TVE 1	1975-09-16	Angelines Morales	Music
El quinto jinete	La 1	1975-10-07		Fiction
El taller de los inventos	La 1	1975-05-10	Alberto Méndez	Children
Este señor de negro	La 1	1975-10-08	José Luis López Vázquez	Fiction
Gente joven	La 1	1975-11-30	Antolín García	Talent show
La guagua	La 1	1975-09-29	Torrebruno	Children
La hora de...	La 1	1975-10-08		Music
La ruta de los descubridores españoles	La 1	1975-05-10		Documentary
Los ríos	La 1	1975-10-07		Documentary
Objetivo nosotros	La 1	1975-06-22	Manuel Rosado	Science/Culture
Página del domingo	La 2	1975-02-02	Paula Gardoqui	Variety Show
Página del viernes	La 2	1975-01-31	Victoriano Fernández de Asís	Talk Show
Pili, secretaria ideal	La 1	1975-01-11	Elena María Tejeiro	Fiction
Revista de cine	La 2	1975-02-05	Alfonso Eduardo	Movies
Revistero	La 1	1975-10-06	Pilar Cañada	Variety Show
¿Sabías que...?	La 1	1975-03-02		Children
Sí o no	La 1	1975-04-11	Victoriano Fernández de Asís	Talk Show
Tiempo de magia	La 1	1975-06-14	Juan Tamariz	Magic Show
Torneo	La 1	1975-04-12	Daniel Vindel	Sport
Turístico informativo	La 1	1975-06-20		News
Un personaje, un cuento	La 1	1975-06-29		Children
Viajar	La 1	1975-10-18	Isabel Baeza	Variety Show
Vivir para ver	La 1	1975-11-04	Alfredo Amestoy	Variety Show
Voces a 45	La 1	1975-06-22	Pepe Domingo Castaño	Music

== Television shows ==
=== La 1 ===
- Telediario (1957– )
- Novela (1962–1979)
- Estudio 1 (1965–1981)
- The Chiripitiflauticos (1966–1976)
- Teatro breve (1966–1981)
- Cuentos y leyendas (1968–1976)
- Revista de toros (1971–1983)
- Estudio estadio (1972–2005)
- Informe Semanal (1973– )
- El Mundo en acción (1973–1978)
- El gran circo de TVE (1973–1983)
- Cantar y reír (1974–1976)
- Cuentopos (1974–1976)
- Los Reporteros (1974–1976)
- Los Libros (1974–1977)
- La Semana (1974–1978)
- Un Globo, dos globos, tres globos (1974–1979)
- El hombre y la Tierra (1974–1980)
- Siete días (1974–1981)

=== La 2 ===
- Torneo (1967–1979)
- Estudio abierto (1970–1985)
- Ficciones (1971–1981)
- Polideportivo (1973–1981)
- Musical pop (1974–1976)
- Original (1974–1977)
- Revista de cine (1974–1981)

== Ending this year ==
=== La 1 ===
- Hoy también es fiesta (1970–1975)
- Cuatro tiempos (1974–1975)
- Fiesta (1974–1975)
- Hoy 14,15 (1974–1975)
- Las Instituciones (1974–1975)
- ¿Le conoce usted? (1974–1975)
- Lo de Tip y Coll (1974–1975)
- Primera hora (1974–1975)
- ¡Señoras y señores! (1974–1975)
- Suspiros de España (1974–1975)
- Tele-Revista (1974–1975)
- Telecomedia (1974–1975)

== Foreign series debuts in Spain ==
English title	Spanish title	Country	Performers
Barnaby Jones	Barnaby Jones	USA	Buddy Ebsen
The Black Arrow	La flecha negra	UK	Gordon Rollings
Dan August	Dan August	USA	Burt Reynolds
Father Brown	El padre Brown	UK	Kenneth More
Heidi	Heidi	JAP	
Kojak	Kojak	USA	Telly Savalas
Little House on the Prairie	La casa de la pradera	USA	M.Landon, K.Grassle, M.Gilbert, M.S.Anderson
Movin' On	En ruta	USA	Claude Akins, Frank Converse
Napoleon and Love	Napoleón y el amor	UK	Ian Holm, Billie Whitelaw
Police Woman	La mujer policía	USA	Angie Dickinson
Slattery's People	El congresista	USA	Richard Crenna, Ed Asner
Soldier and Me	Soldado y yo	UK	Gerry Sundquist
Tenafly	Tenafly	USA	James McEachin
The Borderers	Los hombres de la frontera	UK	Michael Gambon
The First Churchills	Los primeros Churchill	UK	Susan Hampshire
The Immortal	El inmortal	USA	Christopher George
The Six Million Dollar Man	El hombre de los 6 millones de dólares	USA	Lee Majors
The Strauss Family	La familia Strauss	UK	Stuart Wilson
The Waltons	Los Walton	USA	Richard Thomas, Ralph Waite, Michael Learned
Vicky the Viking	Vickie, el vikingo	JAP GER	
War and Peace	Guerra y paz	UK	Anthony Hopkins

== Births ==
- 10 January –
  - Raúl Fernández, actor.
  - Mònica López, meteoróloga and hostess.
- 14 January – Marta Nebot, hostess.
- 14 January – Rodolfo Sancho, actor.
- 25 January – Ruth Díaz, actress.
- 23 February – Álvaro Morte, actor.
- 1 March – María José Suárez, hostess.
- 22 March – Bea Segura, actress.
- 22 March – Sandra Daviú, hostess.
- 24 March – Arturo Valls, actor and host.
- 31 March – Antxine Olano, hostess.
- 7 April – Sergio Peris-Mencheta, actor.
- 13 April –
  - Fran Blanco, host
  - Diana Lázaro, actress.
- 16 April – Mónica Martínez, hostess.
- 17 April – Joaquín Prat Sandberg, host.
- 24 April – Antonio David Flores, pundit.
- 29 April – Lourdes García Campos, journalist.
- 2 May – Eva Santolaria, actress.
- 29 May – María Avizanda, hostess.
- 6 June – Juan Ramón Bonet, host.
- 25 June – Chenoa, Singer, hostess, jury member.
- 29 June – Mónica Estarreado, actress.
- 10 July – Ruth Gabriel, actress.
- 28 July – Lucia Riaño, hostess.
- 30 July – Jota Abril, host.
- 8 August – Raquel Meroño, actress.
- 23 August – Carmen Porter, hostess.
- 16 September
  - Antonio Hortelano, actor.
  - Samanta Villar, journalist.
- 1 October – Mar Saura, hostess.
- 4 October – Sandra Barneda, journalist.
- 23 October – Manuela Velasco, hostess.
- 3 November – Deborah Ombres, pundit.
- 4 November – Raquel Bollo, pundit.
- 13 November – Cristina Saavedra, hostess.
- 20 December – Ignacio Escolar, journalist.
- 26 December – Pablo Puyol, actor.
- Miguel Ángel Garzón, actor.

== See also ==
- 1975 in Spain
- List of Spanish films of 1975
