= 1970 in Spain =

- Decades: 1950s; 1960s; 1970s; 1980s; 1990s
- See also: History of Spain; Timeline of Spanish history; List of years in Spain

Events in the year 1970 in Spain.

== Incumbents ==
- Caudillo: Francisco Franco

== Establishments ==
- AgD Ceuta
- Alcobendas CF
- CD Cieza
- CD Baza
- CD Roquetas
- Jaque—magazine
- RSD Santa Isabel

== Events ==
- 28 December: Burgos trials: Three Basques are sentenced to death, twelve others sentenced to imprisonment (terms from 12 to 62 years), and one is released.

Date unknown

- National Union of Credit Cooperatives is founded.

== Births ==
- 1 January: Joan Francesc Ferrer Sicilia.
- 28 June: Manolo Herrero.
- 5 July: Valentí Massana.

== Deaths ==
- 11 July: Agustín Muñoz Grandes.

== See also ==
- List of Spanish films of 1970
