= Lechuza =

Lechuza (Spanish "barn owl") may refer to:

- La Lechuza, barn owl in Mexican and Texano folk tales
- El Lechuza, a village in Juan Martín de Pueyrredón Department, Argentina
- Lechuza, or Lechuza Caracas, Venezuelan polo club
- Lechuza (album), by band Fenix TX 2001
- La Lechuza, album by Esmerine 2011
- La Tia Lechuza, play by Isabel Cheix 1896
- Lechuza, self-watering planter brand of Brandstätter Group
- Lechuza Blanca, character in Isabelle Allende's Zorro
