= Stefan Yanev (footballer) =

Bulgarian footballer and writer (1939–2024)

Personal information
- Full name: Stefan Georgiev Yanev
- Date of birth: 3 April 1939
- Place of birth: Varna, Bulgaria
- Date of death: 2 February 2024 (aged 84)
- Place of death: Varna, Bulgaria
- Position: Midfielder

Youth career
- 1954–1958: Lokomotiv Varna

Senior career*
Years	Team	Apps	(Gls)
1958	Spartak Varna	2	(0)
1959–1969	Cherno More Varna	228	(16)
- * Club domestic league appearances and goals

Stefan Yanev (Bulgarian: Стефан Янев; born Stefan Georgiev Garofalo; 3 April 1939 – 2 February 2024) was a Bulgarian football player, sports journalist and writer.

== Football career ==
Stefan Yanev was born on 3 April 1939 in Varna, Bulgaria. He played for Cherno More Varna (1958–1969) with 228 matches and 16 goals in the Bulgarian A Football Group on his account. Yanev started his career as a central forward for Lokomotiv Varna but eventually settled in a midfield position as a playmaker with a taste for goal. While doing his compulsory Army service playing for "Rodni krile" Sofia, Lokomotiv merged with another Varna team (Korabostroitel) and competed in the second level (Group "B”) of Bulgarian football, under the name DFS Cherno More. One year later, in 1959, DFS Cherno More merged with Botev Varna (Group "A”) renaming the club. Yanev made his first appearance for Cherno More on 27 September 1959 in a match against Akademik Sofia (4–0) in which he scored two of the goals. He quickly established himself as a leader in the midfield. Yanev took part in the club's England tour in August 1966, opening the score in a match against Coventry City on Highfield Road. The match ended in a 1–1 draw.

== Journalist and writer ==
Yanev stopped playing at the age of 29 to pursue a career as a sports journalist. His final match was a 0–0 draw against Beroe in Varna on 8 December 1969. Stefan Yanev was one of the founders of the Varna Television Centre in 1972. Yanev wrote articles and opinions in the popular newspapers Narodno Delo, Naroden Sport and Start. He appeared as a commentator and a pundit for the Bulgarian National Television and as such, he commented on life from the World Cup finals 1982 in Spain, 1986 in Mexico, 1990 in Italy and 1994 in the USA. Yanev was on air for live radio commentaries from the UEFA Euro 1996 in England and 1998 FIFA World Cup in France.

Yanev wrote 17 books on Bulgarian football. He was a co-writer of the encyclopedic edition The Football in Varna which throws a comprehensive view over the football events in his native Varna over the years.

== Death ==
Yanev died on 2 February 2024, at the age of 84.
