= 1906 in Spain =

- Decades: 1880s; 1890s; 1900s; 1910s; 1920s
- See also: Other events of 1906; List of years in Spain

Events in the year 1906 in Spain.

== Incumbents ==
- Monarch: Alfonso XIII
- Prime Minister:
  - until 6 July: Segismundo Moret
  - 6 July-30 November: José López Domínguez
  - 30 November-4 December: Segismundo Moret
  - starting 4 December: Antonio Aguilar Correa

== Births ==
- February 25 - Domingo Ortega. (d. 1988)
- February 27 - Néstor Álamo. (d. 1994)
- May 16 - José Pastor.
- September 4 - Luis Marín Sabater. (d. 1974)

== Deaths ==
- June 23 - Juan Manuel Sánchez, Duke of Almodóvar del Río.
