= 1975 in Spain =

- Decades: 1950s; 1960s; 1970s; 1980s; 1990s
- See also: Other events of 1975; List of years in Spain

Events in the year 1975 in Spain.

== Incumbents ==
- Caudillo: Francisco Franco (until 20 November)
- Monarch – Juan Carlos I (from 22 November)
- Prime minister – Carlos Arias Navarro

== Events ==
- 27 September – Last use of capital punishment in Spain when five people from militant groups were executed by firing squads.
- 30 October – Juan Carlos I becomes acting head of state due to the ill health of Francisco Franco.
- 14 November – Madrid Accords: Spain agrees to hand over power of the Spanish Sahara to Morocco and Mauritania by the end of February 1976.
- 22 November – Juan Carlos I becomes king of Spain two days after the death of the dictator Francisco Franco who had been in power since 1939.

== Deaths ==
- 20 November – Francisco Franco, dictator (born 1892)

== See also ==
- 1975 in Spanish Sahara
- 1975 in Spanish television
- List of Spanish films of 1975
- List of Spanish number-one singles in 1975
