= 1905 in Spain =

- Decades: 1880s; 1890s; 1900s; 1910s; 1920s
- See also: Other events of 1905; List of years in Spain

Events in the year 1905 in Spain.

== Incumbents ==
- Monarch: Alfonso XIII
- President of the Government:
  - until 27 January: Marcelo Azcárraga Palmero
  - 27 January-23 June: Raimundo Fernández Villaverde
  - 23 June-1 December: Eugenio Montero Ríos
  - starting 1 December: Segismundo Moret

== Births ==
- April 5 - Ramón Torrado. (d. 1990)
- Date unknown
  - Enrique Truan, composer. (d. 1995)
