= 1978 in Spain =

- Decades: 1950s; 1960s; 1970s; 1980s; 1990s
- See also: Other events of 1978; List of years in Spain

Events in the year 1978 in Spain.

== Incumbents ==
- Monarch – Juan Carlos I
- Prime Minister of Spain – Adolfo Suárez

== Events ==
- 28 February – CEIM organization is formed in Madrid.
- 11 July – Los Alfaques disaster: a truck carrying highly flammable propylene explodes near Los Alfaques seaside campsite killing at least 217 people.
- 22 October – An attack in Getxo by the separatist group ETA kills three people.
- 6 December – Spanish Constitution of 1978 ratified in a referendum.
- 1978 Spanish trade union representative elections

== Births ==
- 1 July – Alessandra Aguilar, athlete
- 6 August – Iñaki Rueda, Formula One engineer
- 5 November - Xavier Tondó, cyclist (died 2011)

== Deaths ==
- 7 September – Ricardo Zamora, footballer (born 1901)
