= Truan =

Truan is a Spanish surname. Notable people with the surname include:

- Carlos F. Truan (1935–2012), American businessman
- Enrique Truan (1905–1995), Spanish composer
