= Amalia Domingo Soler =

Spanish writer, feminist, spiritualist, editor

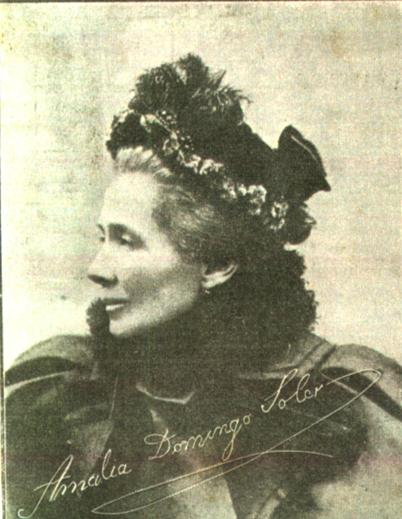
Amalia Domingo Soler

Amalia Domingo Soler (Seville, 10 November 1835 – Barcelona, 29 April 1909) was a Spanish writer, novelist, and feminist, who also wrote poetry, essays, short stories, as well as an autobiography, Memorias de una mujer. She is known for her involvement in the Spanish spiritist movement. Her writings are characterized by poetic and delicate style. She is remembered for her book "Memories of Father Germano". She founded and edited a spiritist weekly, La Luz del Porvenir, characterized by its radical views and feminist orientation. She also served as the editor-in-chief of Luz y unión which succeeded La Luz del Porvenir in 1900. She dedicated more than 30 years to the dissemination of the teachings codified by Kardec.

== Early life ==
Soler was born in Seville, on November 10, 1835. Most of her life took place in a Spain. She was born into a broken family, as her father was absent, leaving her mother with an income that he thought will be enough to support them both. Three days after her birth, Soler began to suffer from an illness in her eyes that would last her entire life and that would cause her mother to dedicate herself solely and exclusively to caring for Soler and educating her.

She learned to read at the age of five; her moral education was rigorous.

In churches, Soler only perceived the luxury or beauty of the statues, but no religious claim. The socio-cultural context in which Soler lived, together with the illness and death of her mother, were two elements that conditioned her life. When her mother died in June 1860, Soler was 25 years old. She was a spinster, without a family, without income from her work or from rents. She sold the furniture in the house and reduced all of her belongings to what fit in the room in which her mother died. She was so affected that it took her three months to recover her memory.

== Seamstress ==
Soler finally decided to accept a pension from her father's relatives, in exchange for being the family seamstress. The pension lasted six months, during which she continued living in the same room in which her mother died. Once the pension was over and without resources, she began to travel through several cities with friends of her mother. This itinerary led Soler to the need to look for work in Madrid, where she hoped to work as a seamstress, and for her poetry to be more valued and remunerated more than it had been until now.

At the beginning of the 1870s, Soler delved into the study of Spiritism. In a short time, her poetry was published in El Criterio and other spiritist magazines of the time, although she did not stop sewing to obtain sufficient income for her personal maintenance.

After visits to Dr. Joaquín Hysern's office, Soler learned about the existence of the Spiritist doctrine and how it answers the questions that worried her so much about the reason for the apparent inequality between people as no theory or religion had responded rationally to these questions. She continued to frequent the evangelical chapel on Calatrava Street, where she went together with her friend Engracia de Ella, and where she had managed to be known. She continued to hear the sermons of the evangelists who sometimes managed to convince her with her arguments, although other times, she mentally refuted them. She gets a spiritist family to give her The Book of Spirits, although she could only read it for 30 minutes in the morning, resting every 20 lines. One morning, when Soler was fixing a tunic (she sews for 15 minutes at a time), she unexpectedly regained her vision.

== Vision regained ==
With the copies of El Criterio she read Fernández Colavida and Lagier y Pomares. Since she couldn't subscribe to the magazine, Soler sent poems in exchange for the subscription. She did the same with as many spiritist magazines as she knows. She asked to be introduced to the Spanish Spiritualist Society and began to frequent its meetings, so much so that on the 5th anniversary of Allan Kardec's death (March 31, 1874) she spoke for the first time in public and read a poem titled "In memory of A. Kardec". From that moment on he always counted on her.

Soler's work day was endless. She sewed in a French woman's sewing workshop and there, she composed the poems that she kept in her memory or that the owner's niece wrote on paper by dictation. Soler faced a dilemma. On the one hand, the directors of the magazines in which she collaborated insisted on the need for her to continue writing, as her articles are highly commented on and valued as they are written in a plain and accessible language that everyone understands. On the other hand, she felt the need to earn her own living and not be a burden to others or to Spiritualism. She must continue sewing because it was the only way to support herself.

Continuing with her eyesight problems, oculists recommended sea baths. As she was known throughout Spain, a spiritualist family from Alicante sent her the money to make the trip and invited her to their house. Her day began at four in the morning, at which time she took a bath, and the rest of the day she dedicated to writing. She visited the spiritualists of Jijona and there she falls ill with fever. Thus, a trip that she thought would last a month turned into a stay of four months after which she recovered and returned to Madrid.

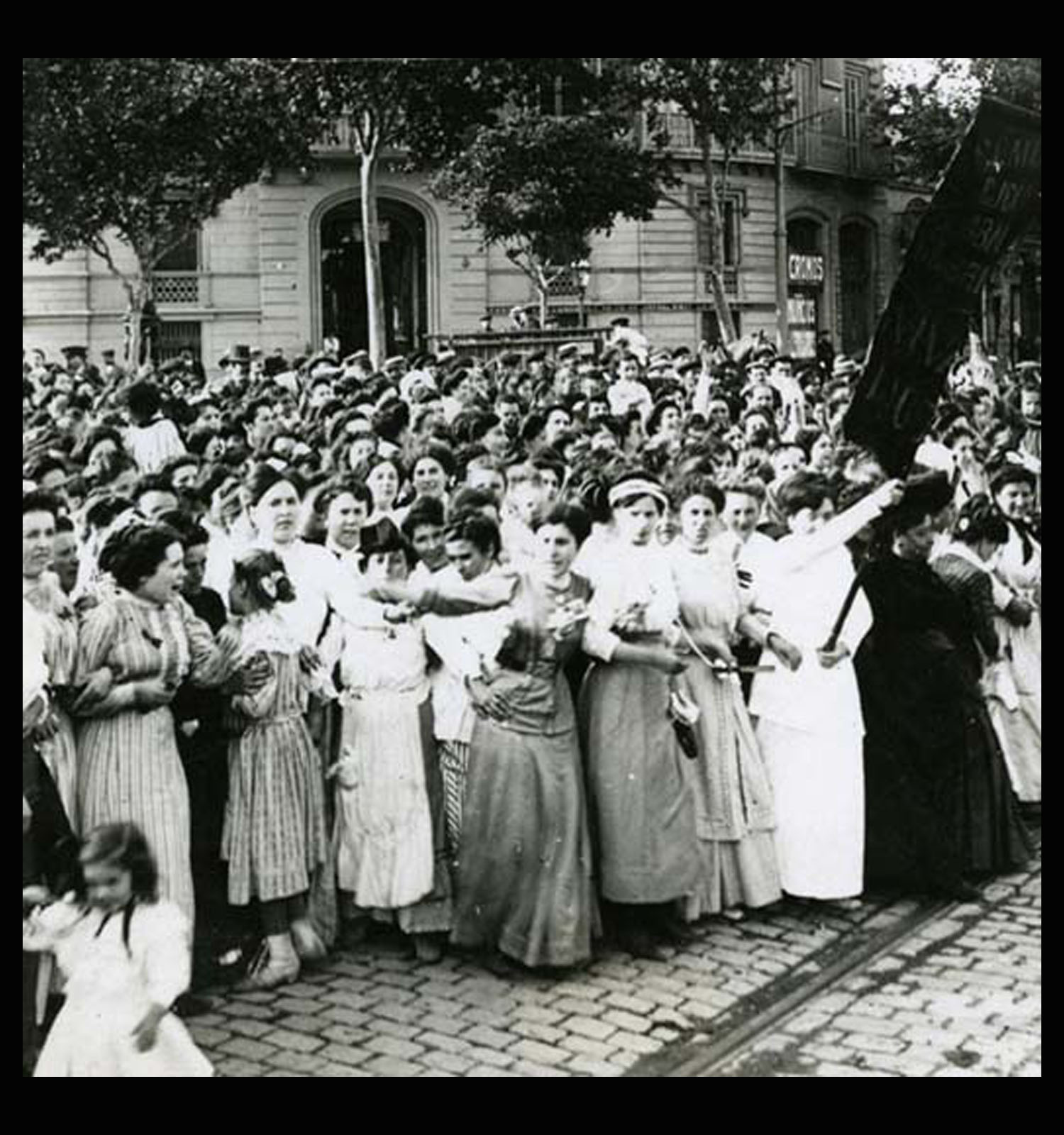
Free-thinking women in Barcelona

Her return in Madrid gave Soler the opportunity to fully dedicate herself to Spiritism. Overcoming great difficulties, she brought knowledge and charity with her. She returned to the French woman's sewing workshop and returned to live with her sister-friend-landlady, to whom she had previously rented a room with a desk where she could write and prepare her articles and collaborations with magazines. Now the domestic situation changed: her old room was occupied. Since she didn't want to be separated from her sister, they decided to share the room and bed. She had no place to write, so she did it at the kitchen table, without privacy, and with continuous interruptions.

== Barcelona ==
In May 1876, Soler received a visit from two Catalan spiritualists with the proposal from Luis Llach, then president of La Buena Nueva de Gracia, that she move to Barcelona and dedicate herself entirely to writing. In Barcelona, she would find work and better pay, and had more time to dedicate to writing. This convinced her, as well as the possibility that her sister's landlady and her family would also move to Gracia.

Upon arrival in Barcelona, Soler and Luis Llach had a conversation in which they both explain intentions -- Soler, that of being independent, looking for work and writing, and Llach, that of the lack of writers and disseminators of spiritualism and the excess of dressmakers and seamstresses. Soon, Soler accepted the hospitality of the entire family, but she encountered the abandonment of her loved ones, the lack of knowledge of the language, aggravated by her vision problem and by the natural adaptation to the dynamics of a family she does not know. She felt clumsy and thought she was more of a nuisance than a help. Her only way out was her articles and she worked on them frantically.

== Women's rights ==
There was a lot of correspondence that Soler received and to which she responded personally. The spiritualists, aware of her hardship, helped her by giving her stamps, paper, envelopes, ink, a writing pad. At the end of August 1877, an article was published in El Diario de Barcelona in which atrocities were said about Spiritism. Llach encouraged Soler to answer in the terms she considers appropriate. Shortly after, she was consecrated as a defender of Spiritism thanks to the controversy held with D. Vicente de Manterola. This will not be the only controversy she maintains; a few years later, with a Piarist, Father Sallarés, and with a Jesuit, Father Fita, and which will be collected in a book entitled Impressions and comments on the sermons of a Piarist and a Jesuit. Coinciding with the controversy with D. Vicente de Manterola, Llach and the spiritist editor Juan Torrents proposed the creation of a spiritist weekly directed by her, for women and in which only women write. La Luz del Porvenir and Cándida Sanz, Matilde Fernandez, Encarnación del Riego, and others will write in it. Her collaborators sent her articles from all Spanish-speaking countries and she maintained a relationship of close friendship with them.

With this, Soler became a pioneer defender of women's rights, demanding the right to education, the free exercise of all professions, equal rights and salaries, independence, dignity. With respect to education, she defended the need to change the female educational system, because until then, women's education was very superficial, designed to develop in a domestic environment and not designed to be able to develop in a professional environment.

The first issue of La Luz del Porvenir was suspended by judicial means for 42 weeks. Soler released The Echo of Truth, with the same characteristics and the same collaborators. It continued to be published until an amnesty made the publication of La Luz del Porvenir possible again. This weekly was published until 1900, the year in which Amalia stopped publishing it due to the serious financial problems that the magazine was going through.

Soler's work did not end with the publication of the weekly but was enhanced with actions in other fields, meeting the needs of the most disadvantaged, collecting aid for those affected by the floods in Murcia, visiting prisoners in the prisons of Barcelona, visiting hospitals to give comfort with his presence and his words to as many people as need it. She, along with other spiritualists (Luis Vives y Vives), founded the Society of Civil Burials given the difficulty that lay people and non-Catholics encountered in burying their relatives in a dignified and economical manner.

== Medium ==
In the midst of all this maelstrom Soler felt deeply melancholy. She talked about it with her friends and one of them, Eudaldo Pagés, an unconscious medium, entered a trance and gave her the first communication on behalf of Father Germán. From that moment on, he helped her with her most important writings and with the necessary explanations to make her task easier. A collaboration began between Amalia-Eudaldo-Father Germán that gave momentum to many writings, and also helped her illustrate practical cases, stories of common lives collected through press clippings sent to her from all over Latin America and Spain and that are explained through the Law of Cause and Effect.

The magazine El Buen Sentido of Lérida promoted a popular subscription that helped Soler cover her expenses in the form of a perpetual pension. This pension lasted from July 1881 to December 1884. The people who participated through donations in this pension were the readers of the magazines, spiritualists, who do not have much income either. At first the donations were numerous, then as the days went by they decreased. Once this pension was over, she continued living with the help of Luis Llach, who considered her another member of his family and who will not abandon her until her death.

She participated as vice president in the World Spiritist Congress that was held in Barcelona in 1888.

== Later life and death ==
After Llach died, Soler's economic situation became so dismal that she was forced to sell her books. Pagés was also old and sick. He moved to the center of La Buena Nueva to live with Amalia to always be at her disposal; he also died. Another medium, María, helped Amalia in her work, but Amalia distrusted her despite the assurances that Father Germán gave her about this second medium.

In her later life, old and sick, Soler fount herself alone, economically and emotionally. Though she was surrounded by women who love her and care for her, the two men who have helped her the most in her work are gone. Soler died on April 29, 1909 due to broncho-pneumonia.

== Publications ==
- Un ramo de amapolas y una lluvia de perlas, o sea, un milagro de la Virgen de la Misericordia, 1868
- Memorias del Padre Germán, 1900
- Memorias de la insigne cantora del espiritismo, 1912
- Te perdono!: Memorias de un espíritu, 1944
- Sus más hermosos escritos, 1952
- Réplica a la escuela materialista
- El Espiritismo
- Ramos de Violetas
- Memorias de una mujer
- Hechos que prueban
- Réplicas de Amalia
- La Luz del Camino
- Cuentos Espiritistas
- Las Grandes Virtudes
