= 1973 in Spain =

- Decades: 1950s; 1960s; 1970s; 1980s; 1990s
- See also: Other events of 1973; List of years in Spain

Events in the year 1973 in Spain.

== Incumbents ==
- Caudillo: Francisco Franco
- Prime Minister: Luis Carrero Blanco (9 June–20 December); Torcuato Fernández-Miranda (20–31 December); Carlos Arias Navarro (from 31 December)

== Events ==
- 8 April – Artist Pablo Picasso dies in Mougins, France.
- 10 May – The Polisario Front leads the Sahrawi insurgency in an effort to end colonial rule in the Spanish Sahara.
- 9 June – The office of Prime Minister is created and the Eighth government of Francisco Franco ends. Luis Carrero Blanco is appointed as Prime Minister by Franco.
- 12 June
  - The Government of Luis Carrero Blanco is established.
  - The Ministry of Development Planning is established to oversee ongoing economic and social development plans which became known as the Spanish miracle.
- 13 August – Aviaco Flight 118 crashes while attempting to land at Alvedro Airport.
- 20 December – Prime Minister Luis Carrero Blanco is assassinated in Madrid by in a bombing organized by ETA. Torcuato Fernández-Miranda acts as interim Prime Minister.
- 30 December – The sentences of the "Carabanchel Ten" are announced following the Proceso 1001 trial.
- 31 December – Carlos Arias Navarro is appointed as Prime Minister.

== Births ==
- 4 January – Laia Marull, actress
- 10 January – Iker Jiménez, journalist
- 5 February – Carme Chaparro, journalist
- 13 February – Miguel Poveda, flamenco singer
- 18 February – Melani Olivares, actress
- 28 February – Xavi Valero, footballer
- 11 March – Vicky Martín Berrocal, fashion designer and actress
- 17 March – Daniel Ballart, waterpolo player
- 19 March – Meritxell Batet, politician
- 20 March – Jaime Sánchez, footballer
- 9 April – Carmen Alcayde, actress
- 14 April – Toni Cuquerella, engineer
- 29 April – Bienvenido de Arriba, politician
- 3 May – Lourdes Maldonado, journalist
- 5 May – David Janer, actor
- 22 May – Emilio Alzamora, motorcyclist
- 23 May – Juan José Padilla, bullfighter
- 13 June – Hasier Arraiz, politician
- 14 July – Candela Peña, actress
- 22 July – Jaime Cantizano, presenter
- 1 August – Antonio Gómez, footballer
- 12 August – Joseba Beloki, bicyclist
- 7 September – Laura Pamplona, actress
- 18 September – Aitor Karanka, footballer
- 21 September – Virginia Ruano Pascual, tennis player
- 17 October – Quique González, musician
- 22 October – Andrés Palop, footballer
- 24 October – Iñaki de Miguel, basketball player
- 3 November – Ana Milán, actress and model
- 8 November – Iñigo Idiakez, footballer
- 15 November – Albert Portas, tennis player
- 21 November – Inés Sastre, actress and model
- 30 December – Nacho Vidal, pornographic actor

== Deaths ==
- 7 January – Pedro Berruezo, footballer (born 1945)
- 10 January – Claudio de la Torre, author (born 1895)
- 16 April – Nino Bravo, musician (born 1944)
- 11 May – Juan Eduardo Cirlot, poet and polymath (born 1916)
- 20 December – Luis Carrero Blanco, Admiral-General and Prime Minister (born 1904)
- 22 December – Julio Gómez, composer (born 1886)

== See also ==
- List of Spanish films of 1973
- List of number-one singles of 1973 (Spain)
- 1973 in Spanish television
