= 1901 in Spain =

- Decades: 1880s; 1890s; 1900s; 1910s; 1920s
- See also: History of Spain; Timeline of Spanish history; List of years in Spain

Events in the year 1901 in Spain.

== Incumbents ==
- Monarch: Alfonso XIII
- Prime Minister: Marcelo Azcárraga Palmero (until 6 March), Práxedes Mateo Sagasta (starting 6 March)

== Events ==
- May 19: Spanish general election, 1901
- Founding of the socialist newspaper La Bandera Roja in Castro Urdiales

== Births ==
- February 3: Ramón J. Sender, novelist (died 1982)
- April 1: Francisco Ascaso (died 1936)
- May 27: Pedro Garfias (died 1967)
- June 29: José Castillo (Spanish Civil War) (died 1936)
- October 15: Enrique Jardiel Poncela (died 1952)

== Deaths ==
- November 29: Francesc Pi i Margall (born 1824)
