= 1909 in Spain =

- Decades: 1880s; 1890s; 1900s; 1910s; 1920s
- See also: Other events of 1909; List of years in Spain

Events in the year 1909 in Spain.

== Incumbents ==
- Monarch: Alfonso XIII
- President of the Government: Antonio Maura (until 21 October), Segismundo Moret (starting 21 October)

== Events ==
- July: Tragic Week (25 July – 2 August 1909); a series of bloody confrontations between the Spanish army and the working classes of Barcelona and other cities of Catalonia, who anarchists, socialists and republicans supported.

== Deaths ==
- 18 May - Isaac Albéniz, composer (born 1860)

Tobias Farrantè Politician
