= 1898 in Spain =

- Decades: 1870s; 1880s; 1890s; 1900s; 1910s
- See also: History of Spain; Timeline of Spanish history; List of years in Spain

Events from the year 1898 in Spain.

== Incumbents ==
- Monarch – Alfonso XIII
- Prime Minister – Práxedes Mateo Sagasta
- Foreign Minister – José Canelejas
- Ambassador to the United States: Enrique Dupuy de Lôme

== Events ==
- February 9 – publishing of the De Lôme Letter
- March 27 – Spanish general election, 1898
- April 11 – U.S. president William McKinley asks the U.S. Congress to declare war on Spain
- April 25 – beginning of Spanish–American War
- July 1 – Spanish–American War: Battle of El Caney
- July 3 – Spanish–American War: Battle of Santiago de Cuba
- December 10 – Treaty of Paris (1898)
- founding of Athletic Bilbao
- founding of Palamós CF

== Births ==
- April 26 – Vicente Aleixandre, poet (d. 1984)
- June 5 – Federico García Lorca, playwright and poet (d. 1936)
- July 17 – Benito Díaz, football manager and player (d. 1990)
- July 27 – Concha Méndez, poet and dramatist (d. 1986)
- October 22 – Dámaso Alonso, poet (d. 1990)

== Deaths ==
- July 1 – Joaquín Vara del Rey y Rubio
- July 3 – Fernando Villaamil
