= 1900 Carlist Sublevation =

- Part of the Carlist Wars
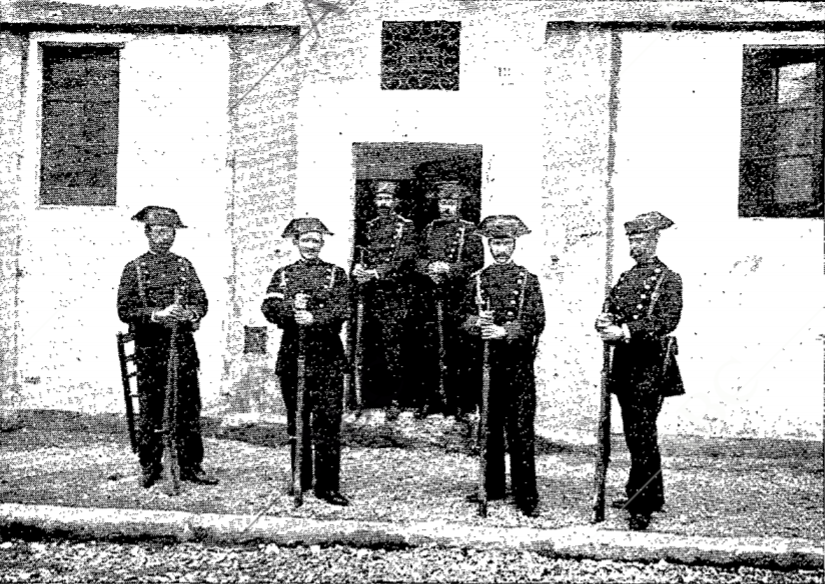
- Badalona barracks. The Civil Guards who resisted the attack of the Carlists.
Date	October 28, 1900
Location	Badalona
Result	Government victory

Belligerents
Kingdom of Spain	Carlist insurgents

Commanders and leaders
Salvador Soliva; Manuel Puigvert	Sergeant Cesáreo García

Strength
Unknown	Unknown

Casualties and losses
Unknown	Unknown

The Carlist uprising of October 1900 was an attempted armed insurrection that originated in Badalona, a city on the border with Barcelona, and which spread to other towns in Spain, although the attempted rebellion quickly failed.

== Precedents ==
The crisis of the Alfonsine monarchy due to the situation in Cuba and in the Philippines, had given new cheers to Carlism. In the climate of tension, in March 1897 isolated groups rose up in Puebla de San Miguel (Valencia) and Castelnou and Calanda (Teruel), which generated a certain social alarm. The newspapers also reported unrest in the Carlist centers of various provinces. However, both the Carlist deputies in Congress and the traditionalist newspaper El Correo Español, assured that the Carlists were calm and that they were not organizing any generalized uprising. The deputy Matías Barrio y Mier strongly condemned the attempt, declaring that the rebels had "acted impatiently, on their own, following irresistible impulses of their enthusiasm, and disobeying our instructions" and stating that "what is supposed and attributed to us would be unpatriotic in the present circumstances."

The following year, in April 1898, faced with the imminent war between Spain and the United States after the sinking of the Maine, Don Carlos stated in letter to Vázquez de Mella, who would not do anything that could hinder Spain's victory, for "not assuming before History the responsibility of the loss of Cuba. However, once the defeat occurred, the Carlists planned a new uprising and had dealings with some generals and military units of the Army.

== Conspiracy ==
In Madrid the Conspiracy Board was chaired by Marquis of Cerralbo, delegate of Don Carlos in Spain, with count of Casasola as treasurer. Parties would have to be formed in Segovia, Burgos and Valladolid, which would take weapons and uniforms from the Civil Guard. Also involved were the Carlist generals Gutiérrez Solana in Álava and Eulogio Isasi in Vizcaya, as well as a cavalry colonel in Álava and a lieutenant colonel from artillery in Guipúzcoa. The count of Rodezno, Tirso de Olazábal and Cerralbo would be in charge of the agitation on the border, for which they had the support of the French legitimists. In Aragón the plot was led by barón de Sangarren and in Valencia Army officers were involved.

The Carlist conspiracy would end up failing, among other things, because General Weyler, who was involved in it, withdrew his support and the European powers showed their opposition to the movement. The Marquis of Cerralbo left Spain and presented his resignation, being replaced in December 1899 by Matías Barrio y Mier. The Carlist youth would attribute the failure to the opposition of Doña Berta, second wife of Don Carlos, who was said to have arrested the suitor when he had already left for Spain. However, some Carlists thought that this was the best opportunity to triumph and would try to carry out the uprising without the authorization of the main leaders.

In Catalonia, Don Jaime was the general in chief and in January 1899 he had been named chief of the General Staff of the Royal Army of Catalonia General Moore, who had the delegation of Captain General Rafael Tristany to direct the organization and preparation work throughout Catalonia. General Moore imposed his military authority in the region over the Carlist civil boards, established the party's Treasury as a military body and divided the territory into military zones. He appointed José de España general treasurer of Catalonia (assimilated to general of the Army), José Muntadas treasurer of the province of Barcelona and interim head of the Barcelona brigade, colonel Salvador Soliva. Matías Ripoll was the general commander of Barcelona. In the other Catalan provinces Juan Baró had been appointed general commander of Gerona and Francisco Cavero general in chief of the Division of Lérida and Tarragona. 3,450 Remington rifles and more than 300,000 cartridges were acquired, in addition to abundant belts, uniforms and berets.

Despite the preparations, finally the order for the uprising did not arrive from Don Carlos, so Muntadas, Soliva and other leaders of Barcelona intended to carry out the uprising without the order and "above the king." ». Moore, opposed this, informing the leadership that anyone who rose up without his order would be dismissed from employment and position. On October 24, he called the brigadier Manuel Puigvert and the mayor Juan Puigvert to dissuade Soliva, who, however, had already given the order to lift up on October 28, 1900.

== The uprising ==
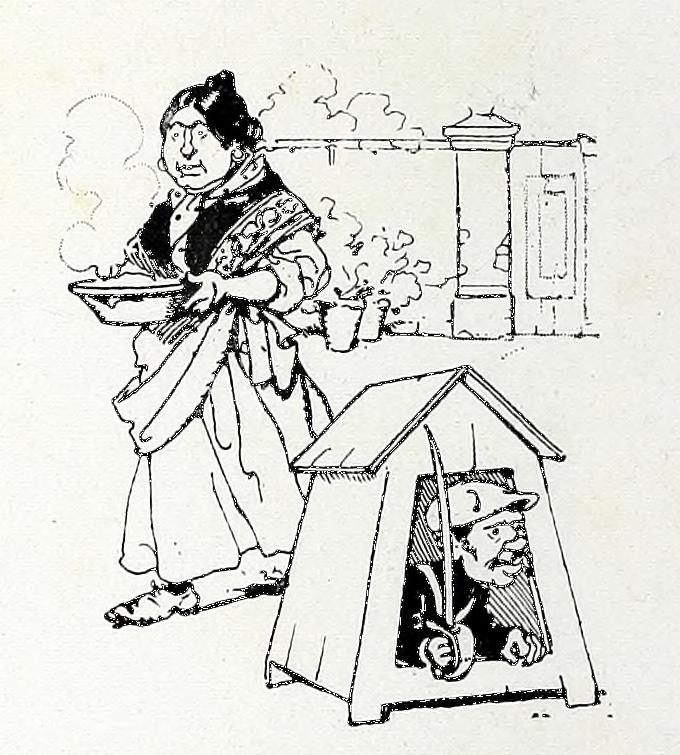
Caricature of the Carlist uprising, in which numerous Carlist militiamen emerge from a lunch basket where they were hiding

The beginning of the insurrection took place on October 28 in Badalona, when between twenty and thirty men led by José Torrents, dressed in a blue blouse, red beret and belt and suspenders, they appeared armed with blunderbusses, Remington carbines and shotguns, in front of the Civil Guard barracks, shouting "Long live Carlos VII!", leading to an intense shootout between the rioters and the police, who closed the doors and shot from the windows, killing the Carlist leader Torrents. After several minutes, the Carlists fled, being pursued by the police forces that lived in the barracks.

Shortly before the revolt, of which the authorities were aware, several house searches had been carried out in the homes of prominent Carlists and numerous arrests had been made, among them, those of Salvador Soliva, titled chief general of the Carlist army in Catalonia and of his assistant, Captain José María Alegría. After the events, the brothers and father were arrested by José Torrents.

In addition to the action in Badalona, another group led by José Grandia rose up in Gironella with workers from the factories in the area, which remained for half a month in the mountains of Berga, as well as others in several Catalan towns such as Igualada, Fígols, Aviá, or Moncada, which lasted two or three days. In Calella Manuel Puigvert alias "Socas" he commanded a party of about 20 or 30 men and in Castelldefels José Miró alias "Pepus" to the mountain with 22 students, being arrested at the beginning of November in San Quintín de Mediona. There were minor attempts at insurrection also in other parts of Spain, for example, in the Valencian region in Alicante and Liria (60 men), in the Sierra de la Carrasqueta (20-30 men), Alcoy and in Alcalá de Chivert ( 14-30 men); and in the province of Jaén in Quesada, Úbeda (12 men) and Baeza (13 arrested).

After the attempt, the government closed all the Carlist circles in Spain and suspended their press for a few months.

== Motivations ==
According to the report that Soliva presented to Don Carlos in 1901, the conspirators contemplated the possibility that the uprising was a "riot", which would not immediately overthrow the government, but would serve to make the projected loan fail. by the Minister of Finance Raimundo Fernández Villaverde, which they considered would be beneficial for the Carlist cause.

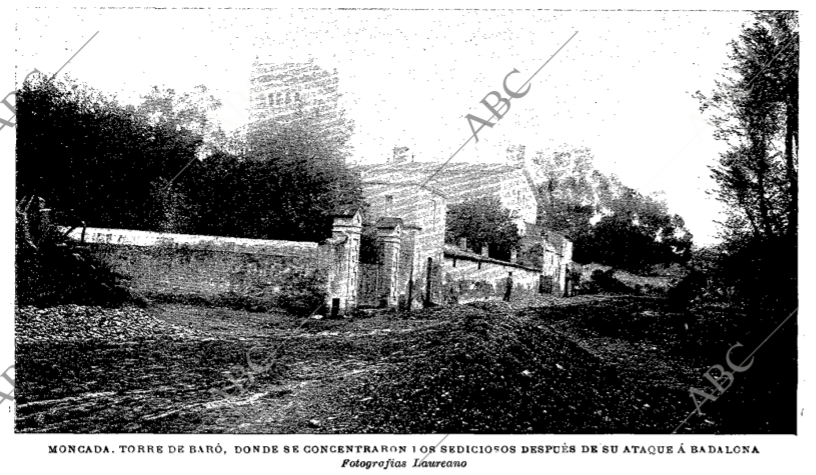
Torre de Baró, in Moncada, where the seditionists gathered after their attack on Badalona.

Likewise, according to Soliva, General Moore had been in contact with José Janer y Ferrán, a stockbroker and committed Carlist, with the intention that the insurrection would also serve to make a stock market move, something that Moore would have hidden from Soliva and Muntadas.

After the failed uprising, Don Carlos declared those involved in it traitors. In response, they wrote a statement in Perpignan to submit to the suitor, in which they acknowledged that they had "anticipated" his orders and had acted impatiently, but that what had moved them was the crisis that Catalonia was going through after the colonial loss, a period that they predicted "a precursor to other misfortunes", foreseeing a paralysis of their industries.

In the same exhibition, which ultimately would not be sent although it would be made public in 1904, they reminded the suitor that before the Treaty of Paris he had committed to using force in case the government caused "a disgrace to the country", which they considered had occurred not only with the sale of the Antilles, but also of the entire Philippine archipelago. The uprising would have been, according to its promoters, "a last effort" to save Spain. The traditionalist historian Melchor Ferrer described the uprising as "the only manly demonstration that occurred in Spain to protest against the shame of the colonial disaster and against the disastrous policy of the Queen Regent."

== Aftermath ==
In 1906, in response to the anticlerical projects of the José López Domínguez government, one of the last Carlist attempts would take place before the requetés uprising of 1936, rising in Valls the departure of Pablo Güell alias "el Rubio", in Calella that of Manuel Puigvert alias "el Socas" and in Rajadell that of Guillermo Moore. As in the attempt of 1900, these parties would act without the permission of the authorities of the Carlist party.

== Sources ==
- González Calleja (1998). The reason for force: public order, subversion and political violence in Restoration Spain (1875-1917). CSIC. ISBN 84-00-07778-4.
- Espasa (1928). Voice "Traditionalism". European-American Illustrated Universal Encyclopedia. Vol. 63. pp. 376–506. ISBN 84-239-4563-4.
- White flags, berets red: a political history of Carlism, 1876-1939 (in Spanish). Marcial Pons History. 2006. p. 33. ISBN 9788496467347.
- González Calleja, Eduardo (1998). The reason for force: public order, subversion and political violence in Restoration Spain (1875-1917). CSIC. ISBN 84-00-07778-4.
- Fernández Escudero, Agustín. "The 17th Marquis of Cerralbo (1845-1922)" (PDF).
- Juan Bardina (1904). Los carlo-traidores: Posthumous memory of General D. Salvador Soliva. Valencia: Biblioteca Españolista.
