= 1982 in Spain =

- Decades: 1960s; 1970s; 1980s; 1990s; 2000s
- See also: History of Spain; Timeline of Spanish history; List of years in Spain

Events in the year 1982 in Spain.

== Incumbents ==
- Monarch – Juan Carlos I
- Prime Minister of Spain – Leopoldo Calvo-Sotelo (till 2 December); Felipe González (from 2 December)

== Events ==
- 12 May – Spanish priest Juan María Fernández y Krohn tries to stab Pope John Paul II with a bayonet during the latter's pilgrimage to the shrine at Fátima, Portugal.
- 30 May – Spain joins NATO.
- 1 October – Coup d'état attempt: Home Office Secretary Juan José Rosón learns of a conspiracy to carry out a coup d'état later in the month. The three main suspects, Artillery Colonel Luis Muñoz Gutiérrez, Artillery Colonel Jesús Crespo Cuspinera, and the latter's brother, Lieutenant Colonel José Crespo Cuspinera, are arrested the following morning.
- 28 October – The general election ends in victory for the Spanish Socialist Workers' Party.

== Popular culture ==
=== Music ===
- Lucía represents Spain at the Eurovision Song Contest, with the song "Él". She finishes 10th out of 18 entries.

=== Film ===
- See List of Spanish films of 1982

=== Television ===
- 14 February – Verano azul concludes its run on TVE1. The series, with 19 episodes that drew up to 20 million viewers in Spain, has been frequently re-run during the summer months in subsequent years.

=== Literature ===
- Miguel Delibes – Los santos inocentes
- Juan Marsé – Un día volveré

=== Sport ===
- 20 April-9 May – 1982 Vuelta a España cycle race

== Notable births ==
- 26 March – Mikel Arteta, football player and manager
- 2 April – David Ferrer, tennis player
- 22 June – Andoni Iraola, football player and manager
- 5 July – Alain Arroyo, footballer
- 1 October – Sergio Sánchez, long-distance runner
- 15 December – Borja García, racing driver

== Notable deaths ==
- 5 November – Santiago Amat, Olympic sailor (born 1887)
- 8 December – Encarnación Fuyola, teacher and activist (born 1907)
- date unknown – José María Valiente Soriano, politician (born 1900)
