= Gimialcón =

- Municipality
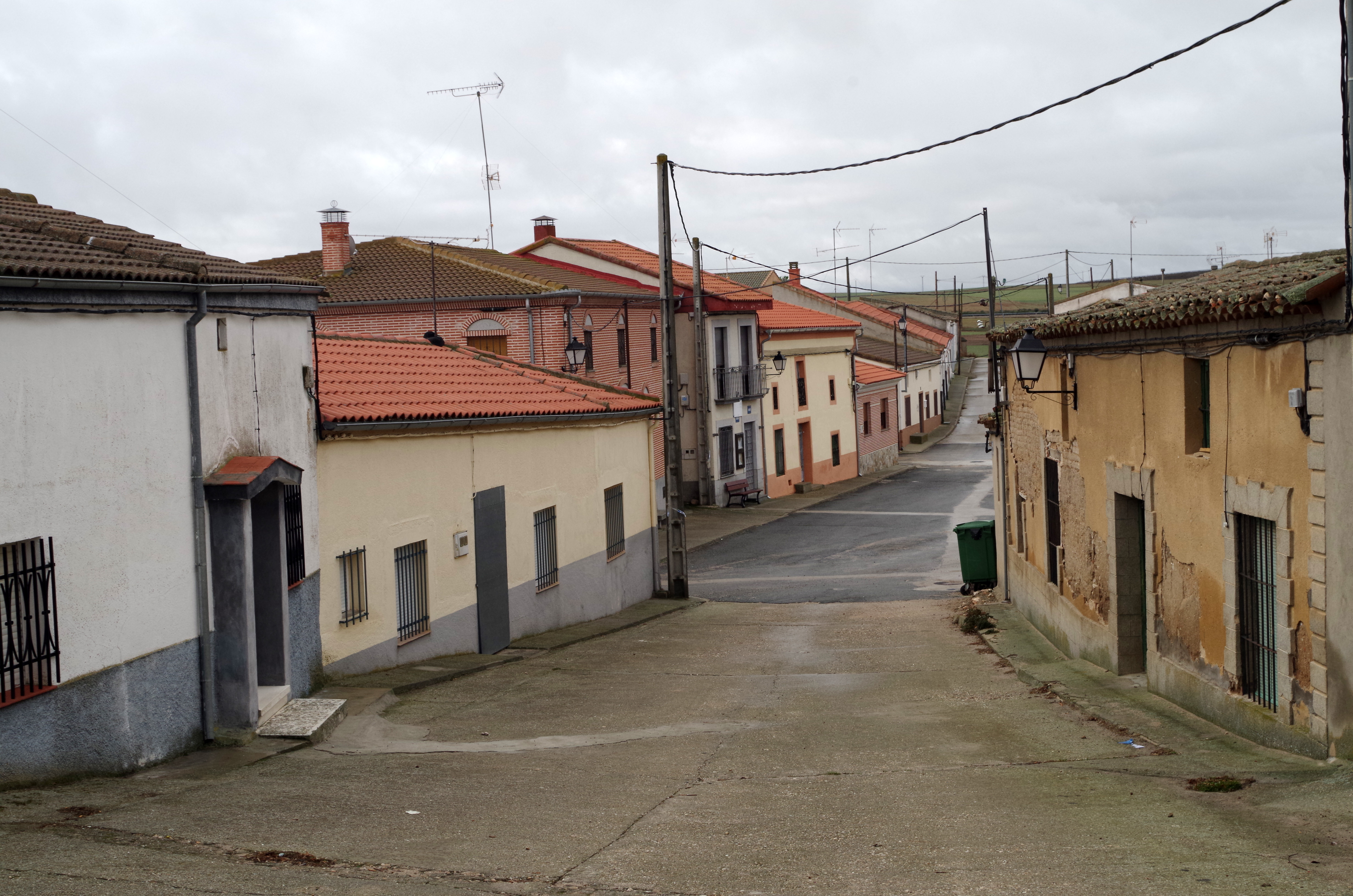
- Flag Coat of arms

- Location in Spain. Gimialcón (Spain)
- Coordinates: 40°52′39″N 5°07′20″W
- Country: Spain
- Autonomous community: Castile and León
- Province: Ávila
- Municipality: Gimialcón

Area
  - Total: 19.05 km^{2} (7.36 sq mi)
- Elevation: 948 m (3,110 ft)

Population (2025-01-01)
  - Total: 73
  - Density: 3.8/km^{2} (9.9/sq mi)
- Time zone: UTC+1 (CET)
  - Summer (DST): UTC+2 (CEST)
- Website: Official website

Gimialcón (Spanish pronunciation: [xi.mjalˈkon]) is a municipality located in the province of Ávila, Castile and León, Spain.

== Population ==
Historical population
| Year | Pop. | ±% p.a. |
|---|---|---|
| 2023 | 74 | — |
| 2024 | 66 | −10.81% |
| 2025 | 73 | +10.61% |
Source: INE

== Notable people ==
- Luis Gabriel Portillo, professor, writer and former politician
