= 1988 in Spanish television =

This is a list of Spanish television related events in 1988.

== Events ==
- 11 January: TVE broadcast Theatre play ‘’Sí al amor’’, starred by Lina Morgan, which is viewed by 17 million people, becoming the most popular TV show that year.
- 25 January: Canal 10, first private TV channel in Spain is launched.
- 14 December: Following the 1988 Spanish general strike Spanish Television stops broadcasting.

== Debuts ==
Title	Channel	Debut	Performers/Host	Genre
3x4	TVE-1	1988-01-11	Julia Otero	Quiz show
Agenda Fin De Semana	TVE-1	1988-01-14		Variety show
A través del espejo	La 2	1988-02-03	Cristina García Ramos	Talk show
Cajón desastre	TVE-1	1988-09-17	Miriam Díaz-Aroca	Children
Cerca de las estrellas	La 2	1988-02-07	Ramón Trecet	Sport
Circo pop	TVE-1	1988-10-05	Raquel Vega	Music
Contigo	TVE-1	1988-06-07	Norma Duval	Variety Show
Crónica joven	TVE-1	1988-01-07	Francisco García Novell	Youth
Derecho a discrepar	TVE-1	1988-01-14	Miguel Ángel Gozalo	Talk show
Diccionario de la salud	TVE-1	1988-01-08	Ramón Sánchez Ocaña	Cultural/Science
Entre líneas	La 2	1988-02-23	Vicente Parra	Cultural/Science
FM 2	La 2	1988-01-28	Christina Rosenvinge	Music
Gatos en el tejado	TVE-1	1988-10-07	José Sacristán	Drama series
La hora del TPT	TVE-1	1988-01-18	José Luis Coll	Quiz show
Juego de niños	TVE-1	1988-03-05	Amparo Soler Leal	Quiz show
Juegos sin fronteras	TVE-1	1988-08-01	Ignacio Salas	Game show
Magia potagia	TVE-1	1988-01-10	Juan Tamariz	Magic
Los mundos de Yupi	TVE-1	1988-04-18	Consuelo Molina	Children
Más estrellas que en el cielo	TVE-1	1988-11-23	Terenci Moix	Talk show
El perro verde	TVE-1	1988-04-28	Jesús Quintero	Talk show
El precio justo	TVE-1	1988-02-29	Joaquín Prat	Quiz show
Querido Pirulí	TVE-1	1988-01-13	Fernando García Tola	Talk show
La realidad inventada	La 2	1988-10-28	Paloma Chamorro	Cultural/Science
Rockopop	TVE-1	1988-10-15	Beatriz Pecker	Music
Tal cual	TVE-1	1988-02-01	Manuel Hidalgo	Variety show
Tariro, Tariro	TVE-1	1988-10-18	La Trinca	Comedy
Viaje con nosotros	TVE-1	1988-01-26	Javier Gurruchaga	Variety show
La vida sigue	TVE-1	1988-01-10	Joaquín Arozamena	Quiz show

== Television shows ==
=== La 1 ===
- Telediario (1957– )
- Un, dos, tres... responda otra vez (1972–2004)
- Estudio estadio (1972–2005)
- Informe Semanal (1973– )
- Parlamento (1978–2014)
- De película (1982–1991)
- La Tarde (1983–1989)
- Otros pueblos (1983–2007)
- Con las manos en la masa (1984–1991)
- Los Marginados (1984–1991)
- Entre amigos (1985–1989)
- Punto y aparte (1985–1991)
- Buenos días (1986–1990)
- 48 horas (1987–1989)
- A media voz (1987–1989)
- Los Mundos de Yupi (1987–1989) I
- Por la mañana (1987–1989)
- Sábado noche (1987–1989)
- Hablando claro (1987–1992)

=== La 2 ===
- Al filo de lo imposble (1982– )
- Pueblo de Dios (1982– )
- Últimas preguntas (1983– )
- En portada (1984– )
- Jazz entre amigos (1984–1991)
- Estadio 2 (1984–2007)
- Metrópolis (1985– )
- Documentos TV (1986– )
- Tendido cero (1986– )
- Agenda informativa (1986–1989)
- El Tiempo es oro (1987–1992)

== Ending this year ==
=== La 1 ===
- Vivir cada día (1978–1988)
- La Bola de Cristal (1984–1988)
- A media tarde (1985–1988)
- Si lo sé no vengo (1985–1988)
- Los Electroduendes (1986–1988)
- A tope (1987–1988)
- Los Aurones (1987–1988)
- En familia (1987–1988)
- La Hora del lector (1987–1988)
- Número 1 (1987–1988) .

=== La 2 ===
- La voz humana (1986–1988)
- Musiquísimos (1987–1988)
- Muy personal (1987–1988)

== Foreign series debuts in Spain ==
English title	Spanish title	Channel	Country	Performers
A Different World	Un mundo diferente	TVE	USA	Lisa Bonet
A.D.	Anno Domini	TVE	USA ITA	Anthony Andrews, Ava Gardner, James Mason
ALF	ALF	TVE	USA	Paul Fusco, Max Wright
Anne of Green Gables	Ana de las Tejas Verdes	TVE	CAN	Megan Follows
Blackadder	La Víbora Negra	FORTA	UK	Rowan Atkinson
Blacke's Magic	Blacke, el mago	TVE	USA	Hal Linden
Deceptions	El engaño	TVE	USA	Stefanie Powers
Doctor Who	Dr. Who	FORTA	UK	
Easy Street	Calle tranquila	TVE	USA	Loni Anderson
Growing Pains	Los problemas crecen	TVE	USA	A.Thicke, J.Kerns, K.Cameron, T.Gold, J.Miller
L.A. Law	La ley de Los Ángeles	TVE	USA	H.Hamlin, S.Dey, J.Smits, C.Bersen
Mother and Son	Madre e hijo	TVE	AUS	Ruth Cracknell
Night Court	Juzgado de guardia	TVE	USA	Harry Anderson
Paradise Postponed	Paraíso pospuesto	TVE	UK	Michael Hordern
Punky Brewster	Punky Brewster	TVE	USA	Soleil Moon Frye
Sorrell and Son	Sorrell e hijo	TVE	USA	Richard Pasco
The Black Forest Clinic	La clínica de la Selva Negra	TVE	GER	Klausjürgen Wussow
The Gemini Factor	El factor Géminis	TVE	UK	Charlie Creed-Miles

== Births ==
- 9 March – Elena Furiase, actress
- 18 April – Nicolás Coronado, actor
- 26 April – Macarena García, actress
- 30 April – Ana de Armas, actress
- 19 May – Nando Escribano, host
- 6 July – Ylenia Padilla, pundit
- 14 August – Loreto Mauleón, actress.
- 16 August – Angie Rigueiro, journalist
- 17 October – Marina Salas, actress
- 21 October – Blanca Suárez, actress
- 30 September – Brays Efe, actor.
- 30 October – Cristina Pedroche, hostess
- 28 November – Adrián Rodríguez, actor & singer
- 14 December – Ana María Polvorosa, actress

== Deaths ==
- 22 February – Carlos Lemos, 79
- 22 April – María Luisa Seco, hostess, 39
- 12 July – Luis Pruneda, host, 64
- 23 September – Luis Losada, journalist, 59
- 14 November – Julia Caba Alba, actress, 76

== See also ==
- 1988 in Spain
- List of Spanish films of 1988
