= 1902 in Spain =

- Decades: 1880s; 1890s; 1900s; 1910s; 1920s
- See also: Other events of 1902; List of years in Spain

Events in the year 1902 in Spain.

== Incumbents ==
- Monarch: Alfonso XIII
- Prime Minister - Práxedes Mateo Sagasta (until 10 December), Francisco Silvela Le Vielleuze (starting 10 December)

== Births ==
- January 9 - Josemaría Escrivá, Roman Catholic priest and saint (died 1990)
- April 4 - José María Albareda. (died 1966)
- July 6 - Jerónimo Mihura, film director (died 1990)
