= 1897 in Spain =

- Decades: 1870s; 1880s; 1890s; 1900s; 1910s
- See also: History of Spain; Timeline of Spanish history; List of years in Spain

Events from the year 1897 in Spain.

== Incumbents ==
- Monarch: Alfonso XIII
- Prime Minister:
  - until 8 August: Antonio Cánovas del Castillo
  - 8 August-4 October: Marcelo Azcárraga Palmero
  - starting 4 October: Práxedes Mateo Sagasta

== Events ==
- June 12 - opening of Els Quatre Gats in Barcelona

== Births ==
- September 18 - Pablo Sorozábal
- October 7 - Julio Ruiz de Alda Miqueleiz
- November 4 - Cipriano Mera

== Deaths ==
- August 8 - Antonio Cánovas del Castillo
