= RSD Santa Isabel =

Santa Isabel
- Full name: Real Sociedad Deportiva Santa Isabel
- Nickname: Santa
- Founded: 1970
- Ground: César Lainez, Zaragoza, Aragón, Spain
- Capacity: 1,000
- Chairman: (Spain) Lorenzo Ferrer
- Manager: (Spain) Ivo Serrano
- League: Segunda Regional – Group 1
- 2024–25: Segunda Regional – Group 1, 5th of 18
Home colours	Away colours

Real Sociedad Deportiva Santa Isabel is a Spanish football team based in Zaragoza, in the autonomous community of Aragón. Founded in 1970, it plays in Segunda Regional – Group 1, holding home games at César Lainez, with a 1,000-seat capacity.

== Season to season ==
Season	Tier	Division	Place	Copa del Rey
1970–71	6	2ª Reg.	9th	
1971–72	6	2ª Reg.	1st	
1972–73	5	1ª Reg.	18th	
1973–74	6	2ª Reg. P.	3rd	
1974–75	5	1ª Reg.	20th	
1975–76	7	2ª Reg. B	2nd	
1976–77	7	2ª Reg. B	3rd	
1977–78	7	2ª Reg.	3rd	
1978–79	7	2ª Reg.	6th	
1979–80	7	2ª Reg.	13th	
1980–81	8	2ª Reg. B	15th	
1981–82	9	3ª Reg.	3rd	
1982–83	9	3ª Reg.	2nd	
1983–84	8	2ª Reg. B	3rd	
1984–85	7	2ª Reg.	2nd	
1985–86	6	1ª Reg.	8th	
1986–87	6	1ª Reg.	6th	
1987–88	6	1ª Reg.	8th	
1988–89	6	1ª Reg.	3rd	
1989–90	6	1ª Reg.	2nd	

Season	Tier	Division	Place	Copa del Rey
1990–91	5	Reg. Pref.	1st	
1991–92	4	3ª	15th	
1992–93	5	Reg. Pref.	6th	
1993–94	5	Reg. Pref.	6th	
1994–95	5	Reg. Pref.	13th	
1995–96	5	Reg. Pref.	18th	
1996–97	6	1ª Reg.	3rd	
1997–98	6	1ª Reg.	2nd	
1998–99	5	Reg. Pref.	15th	
1999–2000	6	1ª Reg.	4th	
2000–01	6	1ª Reg.	2nd	
2001–02	5	Reg. Pref.	3rd	
2002–03	5	Reg. Pref.	1st	
2003–04	4	3ª	18th	
2004–05	5	Reg. Pref.	4th	
2005–06	5	Reg. Pref.	9th	
2006–07	5	Reg. Pref.	9th	
2007–08	5	Reg. Pref.	9th	
2008–09	5	Reg. Pref.	11th	
2009–10	5	Reg. Pref.	2nd	

Season	Tier	Division	Place	Copa del Rey
2010–11	4	3ª	19th	
2011–12	5	Reg. Pref.	8th	
2012–13	5	Reg. Pref.	8th	
2013–14	5	Reg. Pref.	1st	
2014–15	4	3ª	19th	
2015–16	5	Reg. Pref.	3rd	
2016–17	5	Reg. Pref.	17th	
2017–18	6	1ª Reg.	8th	
2018–19	6	1ª Reg.	7th	
2019–20	6	1ª Reg.	1st	
2020–21	5	Reg. Pref.	10th	
2021–22	6	Reg. Pref.	16th	
2022–23	7	1ª Reg.	16th	
2023–24	8	2ª Reg.	10th	
2024–25	8	2ª Reg.	5th	
2025–26	8	2ª Reg.		

- 4 seasons in Tercera División
