= María del Carmen González-Ramos García-Prieto de Muñoz =

Spanish Roman Catholic professed religious

Blessed María del Carmen González-Ramos García-Prieto de Muñoz
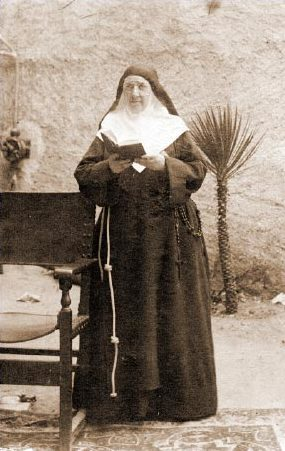
- c. 1895

Religious
- Born: 30 June 1834; Antequera, Málaga, Kingdom of Spain
- Died: 9 November 1899 (aged 65); Antequera, Málaga, Kingdom of Spain
- Venerated in: Roman Catholic Church
- Beatified: 6 May 2007, Antequera Fairground, Málaga, Spain by Cardinal José Saraiva Martins
- Feast: 9 November
- Attributes: Religious habit
- Patronage: Franciscan Sisters of the Sacred Hearts

María del Carmen González-Ramos García-Prieto de Muñoz (30 June 1834 – 9 November 1899), also known by her religious name María del Carmen of the Child Jesus, was a Spanish Roman Catholic professed religious and the founder of the Franciscan Sisters of the Sacred Hearts. She married in mid-1857 – against her parents' advice – to a brash and dissolute husband and secured his repentance not too long before his death.

The religious was beatified in mid-2007 under Pope Benedict XVI though the pontiff delegated Cardinal José Saraiva Martins to preside on his behalf.

== Life ==
María del Carmen González-Ramos García-Prieto de Muñoz was born in Málaga on 30 June 1834 as the sixth of nine children to Salvador González and Juana Ramos. She was baptized at the parish of Saint Mary Major on 1 July 1834. Her mother died on 12 July 1855 and her father died on 8 March 1871.

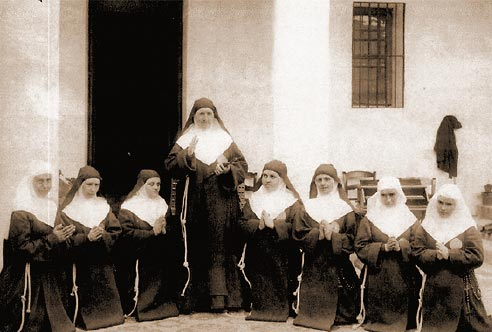
The religious and Mother María Carmen of the Child Jesus (standing), c. 1886

Private tutors oversaw her education. She married on 9 May 1857 to Joaquín Muñoz del Caño – despite the objections of her parents – who turned out to be a violent and unfaithful man. Nevertheless, she saw her duties as a wife as a sign from God and suffered for Him while hoping that her husband would repent until he approached her on 15 July 1878 and announced he would be turning his life around. He begged that she forgive him for his misdeeds. Her husband died after an illness on 3 October 1881.

In 1882, the Capuchin priest Bernabé de Astoraga (her spiritual director) and some female friends helped turn her home into a combination of a clinic and school where she would invite people in who needed her aid. On 8 May 1884 she began living with women she rallied at the convent of Our Lady of Victory that she founded in her hometown in a move that established the Franciscan Sisters of the Sacred Hearts. On 10 May 1884 the order received diocesan approval from Bishop Miguel Salazar Gomez while it later received papal approval after her death from Pope Leo XIII on 3 May 1902. She made her initial vows with eight others on 17 September 1884 and assumed the habit while making her perpetual profession with her new religious name on 20 February 1889.

She died due to typhus on 9 November 1899. Her remains were exhumed on 9 October 1907 and later exhumed once again on 30 May 1947. Her remains at present are at the motherhouse of the order.

== Beatification ==
The beatification process opened in Málaga in an informative process that was inaugurated on 2 February 1945 and it later concluded its business sometime in 1950 while theologians approved her writings on 25 November 1956. The formal introduction to the cause came on 19 December 1963 under Pope Paul VI and she was titled as a Servant of God. An apostolic process was later held from 1964 to 1965 while the newly formed Congregation for the Causes of Saints validated the process on 25 October 1969.

Theologians approved the cause on 12 April 1983 as did the C.C.S. on 21 February 1984 which allowed for Pope John Paul II to confirm her life of heroic virtue and name her as Venerable on 7 April 1984. The process for a miracle was opened in early April 2003 and closed in late May 2003 and it received C.C.S. validation on 24 October 2003 before receiving the approval of a medical board on 10 March 2005 while theologians also approved it on 16 September 2005; the C.C.S. issued their own approval on 7 February 2006. Pope Benedict XVI issued the final approval for the miracle on 26 June 2006 and Cardinal José Saraiva Martins presided over the beatification on the pope's behalf on 6 May 2007 before a crowd of 10,000 people including pilgrims from countries such as Nicaragua and the Dominican Republic. The miracle involved was the 1991 cure of Sister Maria José Rodríguez who was cured of a large tumor in the liver.

The current postulator to the cause is Antonio Sáez de Albeniz.
