= Assassination of Juan María de Araluce Villar =

1976 murder in San Sebastián, Spain

- Part of the Basque conflict
- Location: San Sebastián, Spain
- Date: 4 October 1976; 13:25 (UTC+1)
- Target: Juan María de Araluce Villar
- Attack type: Mass shooting, machine gun attack
- Deaths: 5
- Injuries: 10
- Perpetrator: ETA
- No. of participants: 4

The assassination of Juan María de Araluce Villar was a mass shooting attack by the Basque separatist group ETA which took place on 4 October 1976 in San Sebastián in the Basque Country in northern Spain. Three ETA members carrying pistols and submachine guns killed Araluce, the Government appointed President of the Provincial Deputation of Gipuzkoa and member of the Council of the Realm. Araluce's driver was killed in the attack together with three police guards. Ten bystanders were also injured in the attack, which was ETA's deadliest of 1976.

== Target ==
Juan María de Araluce Villar, a native of Santurtzi, had fought as a pilot with the Nationalist forces during the Spanish Civil War. In the post war period, he worked as a notary until 1967 when he became a member of the Cortes Españolas, the Spanish "parliament" under the Franco regime. He was appointed head of the Guipuzkoan deputation in 1969.

== The attack ==
At between 13:20 and 13:25, Araluce's driver was waiting outside his home on Avenida de España, accompanied by a second vehicle carrying an escort of three police officers. When Araluce got into his car, four ETA members who had been waiting nearby in the bus station approached the vehicles. Two produced pistols, while the other two produced submachine guns. They proceeded to open fire on the cars, concentrating their fire on the second car, which contained the police officers. Hearing the gunfire, Araluce's wife and most of his nine children, who had been having lunch on the fifth floor of the building where he lived, rushed to the street. Although it had been badly damaged by gunfire, his son drove the car which contained his father to the nearby hospital. However doctors were unable to save Araluce. All three of Araluce's escort were killed at the scene, while his driver died at 11pm the same day in hospital. The killers then escaped in a car, which was found abandoned later the same day in the Loyola district of the city, bearing false number plates. In a communique issued from Paris the same day, ETA claimed responsibility for the attack.

== Reactions ==
The assassination received almost universal condemnation from the main Spanish political parties, while the Cortes adjourned for a day as a mark of respect for Araluce.
