= Néstor Álamo =

Spanish composer, lawyer, and writer

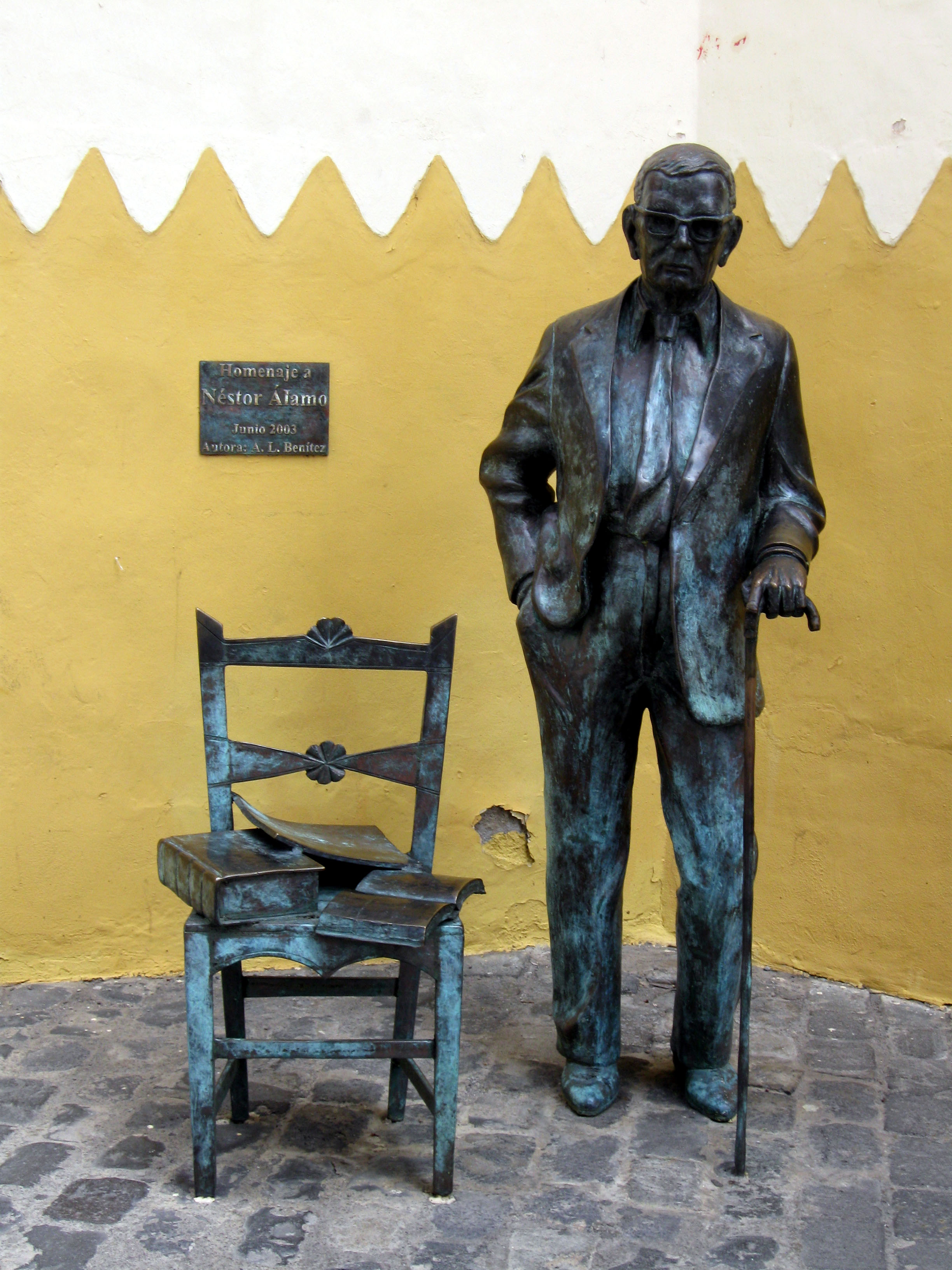
Néstor Álamo

Néstor Álamo (27 February 1906 – 23 March 1994) was a Spanish composer, lawyer and writer.
