= National Union of Credit Cooperatives =

Spanish credit cooperative association

The National Union of Credit Cooperatives (UNACC) is a Spanish organization that represents the interests of the nation's credit cooperatives. Founded in 1970, its membership consists of all the existing credit cooperatives in Spain. Endowed with its own legal status and full capacity to act, it complies in its structure and operation with the principles formulated by the International Co-operative Alliance.

== Functions of UNACC ==
- Represent and defend the general interests of its associated entities before the public, international, national, regional and local administrations and before whichever other natural or legal persons to exercise, where appropriate, the relevant judicial and administrative actions.
- Encourage the promotion of cooperative banking and support the training of its members.
- Conciliation to conduct conciliation in conflicts between its associated entities.
- Act as interlocutor and representative before the public bodies and organizations.
- Organize and coordinate advisory services, training, auditing, legal or technical assistance, and any other services necessary for its Associated Entities.
- Sectorial representation to hold the sectorial representation of the Credit Cooperatives with regard to collective negotiation and labour relations, in accordance with the current legislation.

== Governing Bodies and General Management ==
General Assembly, Governing Council (Posts: President, Two Vice Presidents, Secretary, 11 Members and 4 Auditors) and General Secretariat.

== Associations ==
The Union of Credit Cooperatives is a member of the following organisations:

- European Association of Co-operative Banks (EACB)
- World Council of Credit Unions (WOCCU)
- Madrid Financial Centre
