= La Bandera Roja =

La Bandera Roja ('The Red Flag') was a socialist weekly newspaper published from Castro Urdiales, Spain in 1901.
