= Francisco Casanovas =

Spanish conductor, composer, pedagogue, clarinetist, saxophonist and flautist

Francisco Casanovas Tallardá
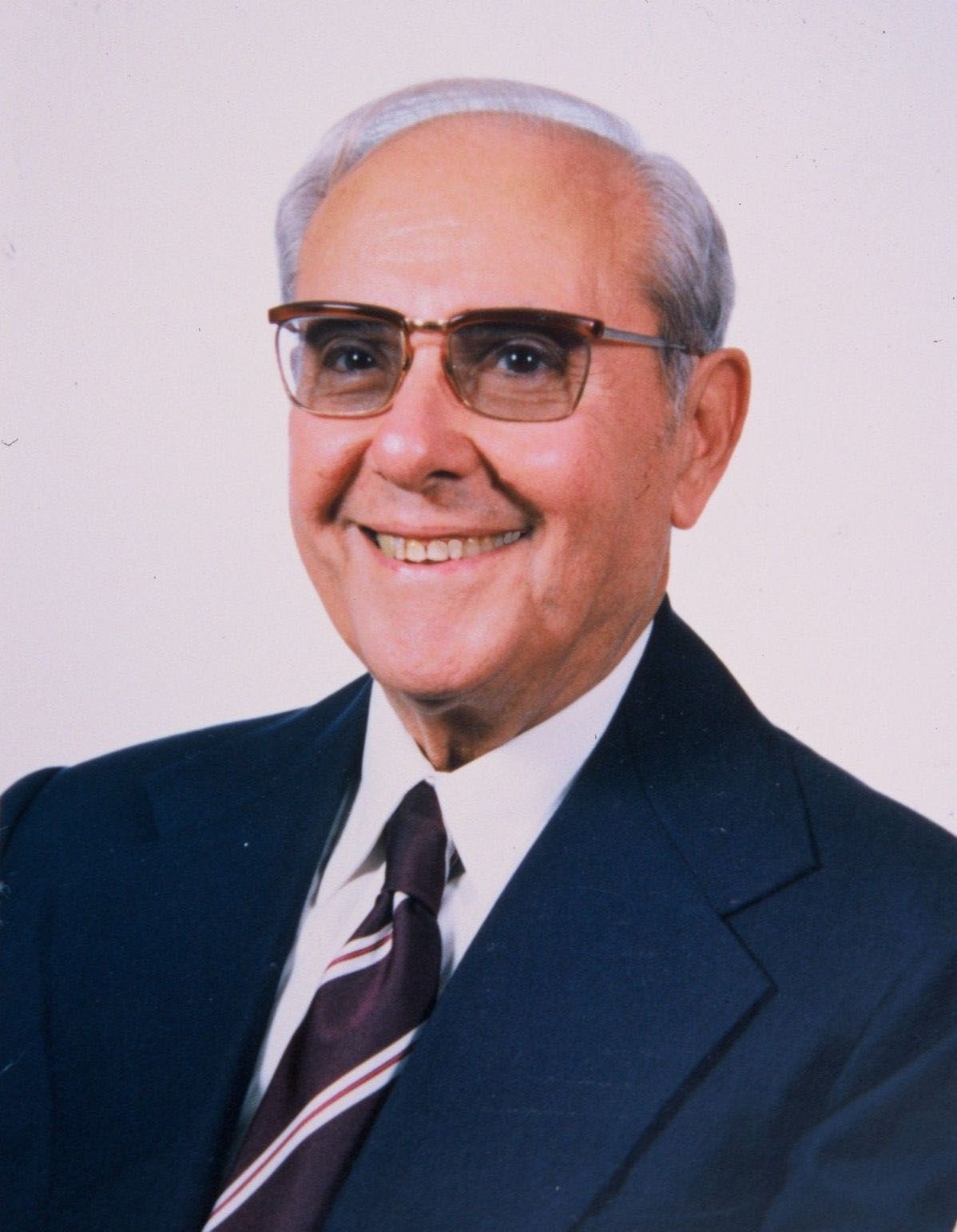
- Born: October 9, 1899; Spain, Barcelona, Spain
- Died: December 16, 1986 (aged 87); Spain, Murcia, Spain
- Citizenship: Spanish
- Occupations: Musician and composer

Francisco Casanovas Tallardá (Barcelona, October 9, 1899 – Murcia, December 16, 1986) was a Spanish conductor, composer, pedagogue, clarinetist, saxophonist and flautist.

== Biography ==
Francisco Casanovas Tallardá was born in San Gervasio, Barcelona. He took his first music lessons at the Conservatorio de Música del Liceo of Barcelona and the Town School of Music. He studied harmony and composition with the teachers Lamote de Grignon y Morera and specialised in flute with maestro Vila. Among his classmates was the famous specialist in music theory Joaquín Zamacois. At the age of fifteen, in 1915, he made his debut in the Gran Teatre del Liceu with the violinist Eduard Toldrà and the Polish harpsichordist Wanda Landowska, performing Concert No. 5 of Brandenberg, by Johann Sebastian Bach. During the intermission of the act, he performed some arias with the soprano María Barrientos. In 1918 he made his debut with the Orchestra of the Gran Teatre del Liceu in the Palau de la Música. In 1919 he entered as a soloist in the recently created Orquestra Pau Casals, after being heard by the cellist after whom the orchestra is named, Pablo Casals, in person. With this orchestra, Casanovas performed, among others, in the Champs-Élysées Theatre in Paris due to the celebration of the Olympic Games, 1924.

In 1925 he was summoned by Eduardo Granados, son of the famous composer Enrique Granados, to perform the famous solo for the beginning of Rhapsody in Blue, by George Gershwin, with the clarinet; it was the first performance of this work in Spain. At about 1930 he arrives in India for the first time, and makes a concert tour with his jazz orchestra. A short time after this, he was appointed Principal of the Calcutta School of Music. He stayed in India for 27 years. There he became acquainted with Mother Teresa, the Mountbatten family (the last English viceroy in India), Pandit Nehru (Indian Prime Minister), and Gandhi, among others. But probably he kept a closer friendship with Mehli Mehta (father of the orchestra conductor Zubin Mehta, and to whom he taught music), who had established the Bombay Symphony Orchestra, of which he was its conductor and concertmaster. The fruitful musical collaboration with Mehta culminated in 1952 with the concert tour of India given by the violinist Yehudi Menuhin. He performed with the Bombay and Calcutta orchestras in different cities of the country, being Mehli Mehta the concertmaster and Francisco Casanovas the conductor. He also collaborated in India with the Nobel Prize Laureate in Literature Rabindranath Tagore; thus, while the Indian national anthem's lyrics are Tagore's, the harmonisation is by Casanovas. He got a First Prize and the Golden Button playing the saxophone (an instrument which he had learned to play by himself in Paris) in the last edition of the International Interpretation Contest organised by Columbia Records, New York, in 1948, with his work Guajiras para saxofón y piano. He became conductor of the New York Symphonic Jazz Orchestra.

Casanovas left India for ever in 1956 and went to Great Britain, where he stayed for some years. In 1959 he returned to Barcelona where he was invited to conduct the best orchestras of the Catalan city (Chamber Orchestra, Symphony Orchestra and Symphonic Jazz Orchestra). Under his expert conduction performed artists such as Benno Moiseiwitsch, Yehudi Menuhin, Gaspar Cassadó and Mehli Mehta. Between 1959 and 1967 he resides in Tarragona, Spain, and conducts the Music Band and the Musical Society La Lira Ampostina and also creates, in the same city, the Chamber Orchestra and the Choral Society Ocells de Montsià. He composes, among others, the hymn of the society. At about 1965 he befriends Igor Markevich, first conductor of the Radio Televisión Española Symphony Orchestra, by means of a friend of both, the guitarist Narciso Yepes.

After his stay in Amposta, Spain, he moved to Valencia where he conducted the Town Orchestra. He was also in charge of conducting the Music Band and was made principal of Liria Unión Musical from 1967 to 1969. On December 5, 1969, he was awarded with the Unión Musical golden badge «on the grounds of his outstanding work», according to the programme issued at the time.

In 1970 he arrived in Torrevieja, Spain, where he was appointed for conducting the Unión Musical Torrevejense and its Musical Academy. For more than twelve years he forged a whole generation of musicians, many of whom occupy important positions in Valencian and Spanish musical panorama. He died on December 16, 1986, in Murcia, Spain.

== Works ==
- Overture on Indian motives
- Symphonic poems: Ellen's vision, Legend, Oriental Perfume and Celtic Rhapsody
- Symphony in D «Chronologic»
- Concert in D major for flute and orchestra
- Rhapsody for violin and string orchestra
- Fugal Concert in A minor for orchestra
- La gata i el belitre (dedicated to Narciso Yepes)

== Distinctions ==
Nowadays, two cities, Torrevieja and Amposta, have dedicated streets to his name. Besides, the Torrevieja Conservatory and a choir of the same city brand his name.

== Bibliography ==
- "La Unión Musical Torrevejense: Origen y Evolución Histórica (1842-2002)", Ad Turres. Revista del Archivo Municipal de Torrevieja. Concejalía de Archivo.: 157, 2003
