= Luz y unión =

Spiritual magazine in Spain (1900–1914

- Editor-in-chief: Amalia Domingo Soler
- Categories: Spiritual magazine
- Frequency: Monthly
- Founded: 1900
- Final issue: 1914
- Country: Spain
- Based in: Barcelona
- Language: Spanish

Luz y unión (Spanish: Light and union) was a spiritualist magazine which was published in Barcelona between 1900 and 1914. It was the official organ of the Kardecian Spiritualist Union of Catalonia.

== History and profile ==
Luz y unión was started as a merger of two magazines, La Luz del Porvenir and La Unión Espiritista. The Kardecian Spiritualist Union of Catalonia which included different groups, mainly Catalan, French and Latin American was the owner of the magazine. Jacinto Esteva Marata was the director of the magazine of which editor-in-chief was the Andalusian writer Amalia Domingo Soler. It had correspondents in different countries, including Argentina, the Dominican Republic, Brazil, Cuba and Nicaragua.

Luz y unión published articles on spiritism which also contained an evaluation of its development in Spain. The magazine was published four times a month with eight-page numbers and later became a monthly publication with thirty-pages. From 1902 its title was renamed as Luz y unión. Revista de estudios psicológicos (Spanish: Light and union, magazine of psychological studies).

Luz y unión was published until 1914 when it was replaced by another magazine entitled Luz, unión y verdad.
