= 1989 in Spain =

- Decades: 1960s; 1970s; 1980s; 1990s; 2000s
- See also: Other events of 1989; List of years in Spain

Events in the year 1989 in Spain

== Incumbents ==
- Monarch: Juan Carlos I
- Prime Minister: Felipe González

== Events ==
- 19 October - Vandellòs I nuclear accident: a fire breaks out in one of the nuclear plant's generators killing 31 employees and firefighters and exposing 130,000 people to radiation.
- 29 October - General election takes place
- The University of Las Palmas de Gran Canaria is established.

== Births ==
- 20 September – Paula Klamburg, synchronized swimmer

== Deaths ==
- 27 November – Carlos Arias Navarro, politician (born 1908)
