= October 1978 Getxo attack =

Terrorist incident in Spain

- Part of the Basque conflict
- Location: Getxo, Spain
- Date: 22 October 1978; 17:30 (UTC+1)
- Target: Civil Guards
- Attack type: Gun attack, mass shooting, triple murder
- Weapons: Machine guns Shotguns
- Deaths: 3
- Injuries: 1
- Perpetrators: 4 ETA

The October 1978 Getxo attack was a mass shooting gun attack by the Basque separatist organisation ETA which occurred on 22 October in the Basque town of Getxo, a suburb of Bilbao. The attack occurred six weeks before a referendum to approve a new Spanish constitution.

The targets were a group of four civil guards who were returning from policing a football game involving Arenas Club de Getxo. After the game had finished, the civil guards were returning to their barracks, walking along Maximo Aguirre Street in the town.

Four ETA members, armed with machine guns and shotguns, who had been lying in wait behind the wall of the local Telefónica building, ambushed the civil guards, subjecting them to heavy gunfire before fleeing. Two of the civil guards were killed instantly, while the other two were seriously injured, with one of them dying in hospital four days later.

The ETA members involved escaped in two cars, driven by a further two participants in the attack. The cars were later found abandoned in the Deusto district of Bilbao. ETA claimed responsibility for the attack in a communique issued the following day. The funerals of those killed saw protests against ETA.
