= 1974 in Spain =

- Decades: 1950s; 1960s; 1970s; 1980s; 1990s
- See also: History of Spain; Timeline of Spanish history; List of years in Spain

Events in the year 1974 in Spain.

== Incumbents ==
- Caudillo: Francisco Franco

== Events ==
- April 23 – The 29th edition of the road cycling race the Vuelta a España ('Tour of Spain') is held.
- August 11 – The government repeal a law banning women from bullfighting.
- September 13 – The Cafetería Rolando bombing takes place, killing 13 people.
- October 25 – The 22nd RACE Rally of Spain is held, won by driver Antonio Zanini and his co-pilot Eduardo Martínez-Adam.
- The Spanish International Badminton Tournament commences in Madrid.

== Publications ==
- Carmen Martín Gaite's novel Retahílas.
- José Manuel Caballero Bonald's novel Ágata Ojo de Gato ('Agatha Cat's Eyes')
- Guillermo Cabrera Infante's novel Vista del amanecer en el trópico ('A View of Dawn in the Tropics')
- Guillermo Carnero's poetry collection Variaciones y figuras sobre un tema de La Bruyère ('Variations and Figures on a Theme from La Bruyère')
- Jaime Gil de Biedma's memoir Diario del artista seriamente enfermo ('Diary of a Seriously Ill Artist')
- Vicente Aleixandre's poetry collection Diálogos del conocimiento ('Dialogues of Discovery')

== Births ==
- March 23 – Jaume Collet-Serra, film director and producer
- April 25 – Louis Alphonse de Bourbon, King of France
- April 28 – Penélope Cruz, actress
- June 18 – Itziar Ituño, actress
- October 4 – Paco León, actor
- November 19 – Iván Sánchez, actor

== Deaths ==
- March 1 — Aníbal Otero, linguist accused of spying by the Franco dictatorship (born 1911)
- March 2 — Salvador Puig Antich, anarchist militant and one of the last two men executed by garrote in Spain (born 1948)
- March 2 — Heinz Chez, anarchist militant and one of the last two men executed by garrote in Spain (born 1944)
- July 21 — Miquel Brasó i Vaqués, archaeologist (born 1904)
- August 3 — Joaquim Amat-Piniella, writer (born 1913)

== See also ==
- List of Spanish films of 1974
- List of number-one singles of 1974 (Spain)
- 1974 in Spanish television
