= Luis Gabriel Portillo =

Spanish politician (1907–1993)

Luis Gabriel Portillo Pérez (1907–1993) was a Spanish professor, left-wing politician and writer who lived in exile in the United Kingdom.

== Early life and career ==
Luis Gabriel Portillo was born in Gimialcón (Ávila, Spain) to Justino Portillo, a medical doctor, and his wife Ana María Pérez. His family moved in 1909 to Madrigal de las Altas Torres, also in Ávila.

He studied at Salamanca and Madrid, becoming a professor of civil law at the University of Salamanca in 1934, where he befriended Miguel de Unamuno, the then rector of the university. He became Deputy Secretary of Justice during the Second Spanish Republic.

== Spanish Civil War and exile ==
During the Spanish Civil War he supported the Republicans, though in a non-combatant role for fear of killing one of his six brothers, who were all on Franco's side. At the end of the war he went into exile in England, aided by Leah Manning, a Labour MP. In England he worked in a refugee camp for evacuated Spanish children, where he met his wife Cora (née Blyth). Having arrived as a "penniless refugee... his qualifications... worth nothing", and initially unable to speak English, he had to take a job sweeping roads for "10 bob a week". Later on he worked as a translator for the civil service and in news media as a translator and editor. He also published poetry.

In 1972, he became chief of the London Diplomatic Office of the Spanish Republican government in exile. On 23 June 1977, 40 years after being dismissed and nearly two years after Franco's death he was politically rehabilitated as a university professor.

In 1977, he was one of the founders of the new Republican Left, a Spanish party which took its name from Manuel Azaña's party of the same name which had been previously dissolved in 1959.

== Personal life ==
Portillo married Cora Waldegrave Blyth, daughter of John Waldegrave Blyth, of Wilby House, Kirkcaldy, Scotland, a millionaire linen manufacturer and art-collector from a well-known linen-weaving family. She worked as a censor in the postal service and for the BBC Latin American service, having read Spanish and French at St Hilda's College, Oxford. They had five sons, including Michael Portillo, who is a British journalist, broadcaster, former Conservative Party politician and Cabinet Minister.

Portillo died in 1993, having suffered from Alzheimer's disease.
