= CEIM =

The Madrid Confederation of Employers and Industries (CEIM in its Spanish acronym) is an organization that represents the business owners of Madrid, Spain.

== History ==
Several groups of business led by Max Mazin formed Independent Employers Association (AEI) and later Madrid Independent Employers Association (AEIM). In Madrid the Madrid Employers Federation (FEM) and Federation of Employers' Associations of Madrid (FAEM) joined with AEIM and formed CEIM on 28 February 1978. The first president was Jose Antonio Segurado.

== Governance ==
=== Presidents ===
- José Antonio Segurado (1978–1985)
- Fernando Fernández-Tapias (1985–2002)
- Gerardo Díaz Ferrán (2002–2007)
- Arturo Ferández

=== Generals secretary ===
- Agustin Mascareñas (1978–2000)
- Alejandro Couceiro (2000- )

=== General Assembly ===
The representative organ of the Confederation. It is formed by organisations and companies.

=== Board of directors ===
It is formed by people chosen in General Assembly.

=== Executive committee ===
It is formed by the president, vice-president, the treasurer, the accountant and the representatives

== Assessments ==
The board of assessors is formed by Advisory council, council of presidents, and the work commissions.

=== Advisory council ===
It assesses the president.

=== Council of presidents ===
The council of presidents comprises the regional and sectional presidents along with the national vice-president, Treasurer and Accountant.

=== Work commissions ===
Work commissions study affairs about which governing members must make decisions.

== Departments ==
The CEIM assesses, informs and supports Madrid businessmen about the following topics:

- Economy
- Labour
- Training
- International trade
- Innovation
- Urbanism
- Communication
