= Julio Gómez (composer) =

Spanish composer

Domingo Julio Liberato Macario Gómez García (20 December 1886 in Madrid – 22 December 1973) was a Spanish composer.

== Works, editions and recordings ==
Recordings:

- Julio Gómez - Canciones. Anna Tonna (mezzo-soprano) Jorge Robaina (piano). Verso
- Julio Gómez - Obra sinfónica completa. Orquesta de Córdoba. José Luis Temes. Verso
- Julio Gómez - Lirico concerto for piano and orchestra. Orquesta Nacional de España. Joaquin Parra (piano) Jose Collado (conductor)
