= 1904 in Spain =

- Decades: 1880s; 1890s; 1900s; 1910s; 1920s
- See also: Other events of 1904; List of years in Spain

Events in the year 1904 in Spain.

== Incumbents ==
- Monarch: Alfonso XIII
- Prime Minister: Antonio Maura (until 16 December), Marcelo Azcárraga Palmero (starting 16 December)

== Births ==
- March 4 - Luis Carrero Blanco, navy officer (d. 1973)
- May 11 - Salvador Dalí, artist (d. 1989)

== Deaths ==
- January 13 - Urbano González Serrano (b. 1848), krausipositivista intellectual
