= Maria Carratalà i Van den Wouver =

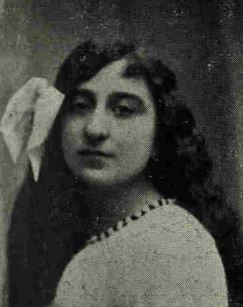
Maria Carratalà

Maria Carratalà i Van den Wouver (Barcelona, 1899-1984) was a Catalan concert pianist, musicologist, music critic, translator and playwright.

She studied at the French School in Barcelona, and the Conservatori Superior de Música del Liceu, training under Modest Serra i Gonzàlez, Vicenç Costa i Nogueras (piano), Andreu Avel·lí Abreu i Boy, and Francesc de Paula Sánchez i Gavagnach (theory and harmony). She finished ger studies in 1916. She was a lecturer, consultant and head of music of the Lyceum Club de Barcelona, who presided temporarily. She joined the World Congress of Women held in Paris in July 1934. In addition, she belonged to,

- Acció Catalana
- Front Únic Femení Esquerrista de Catalunya (1932)
- Institut de Cultura i Biblioteca Popular de la Dona
- Club Femení i d'Esports de Barcelona
