= 1975 in Spanish Sahara =

- Decades: 1950s; 1960s; 1970s
- See also: Other events of 1975; Timeline of Sahrawi history

The following lists events that happened during 1975 in Spanish Sahara.

== Events ==
=== May ===
- May 12-19 - After initially having been denied entry by Spanish authorities, Simeon Aké, UN ambassador of the Côte d'Ivoire (Ivory Coast); Marta Jiménez Martinez, a Cuban diplomat; and Manouchehr Pishva, from Iran did a UN tour of the country to investigate political instability and impose the United Nations General Assembly Resolution 3292.

=== October ===
- October 1 - Morocco and Mauritania announced they would invade Western Sahara and split it between themselves after Spain announces a referendum would be held for the Sahrawi colony.
- October 16 - Moroccan King Hassan II announced plans for a march of over 350,000 civilians across the border to Western Sahara to claim the parts of Western Sahara for Morocco.

=== November ===
- November 6 - Morocco begins a Green March into Spanish Sahara with unarmed civilians, despite Spain's warnings of them being shot.
- November 9 - When Spain announced it will not fight for Western Sahara, Morocco's Green March was called off. Moroccan King Hassan II said, "Spain is not only a friendly country, it also is a neighborly and fraternal nation."
- November 14 - Spain abandons Western Sahara and announces that it will be divided between Morocco and Mauritania.

=== December ===
- December 10 - The Polisario Front begins their first attack, striking Mauritanian troops in Western Sahara.
