= Antonio María Fabié =

Spanish politician, writer, philosopher, historian and bibliophile

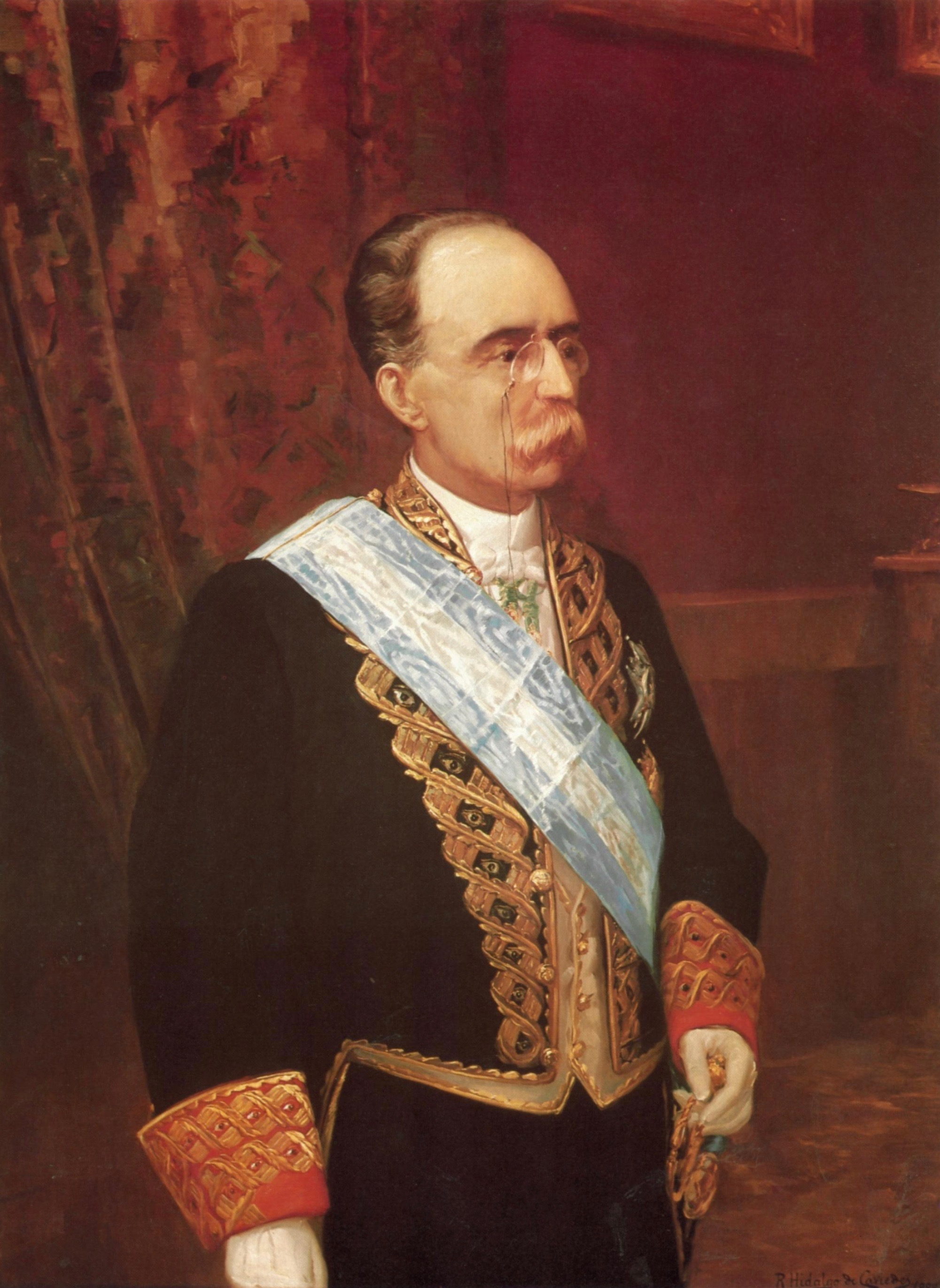
- Born: Antonio María Fabié Escudero; 19 June 1832; Seville, Spain
- Died: 3 December 1899 (aged 67); Madrid, Spain

Seat R of the Real Academia Española
- In office 24 May 1891 – 3 December 1899
- Preceded by: Tomás Rodríguez Rubí
- Succeeded by: Ángel María Dacarrete (Note: Dacarrete was elected for the position in 1900 but never took the seat)

Antonio María Fabié Escudero (Seville, 19 June 1832, – Madrid, 3 December 1899) was a politician, writer, philosopher, historian, and bibliophile, noted for his Hegelian Philosophy which he became interested in during the mid-nineteenth century while a student at the University of Sevilla. He studied pharmacy, exact science, and law.

Fabié was elected to seat R of the Real Academia Española, he took up his seat on 24 May 1891.
