= 1903 in Spain =

- Decades: 1880s; 1890s; 1900s; 1910s; 1920s
- See also: Other events of 1903; List of years in Spain

Events in the year 1903 in Spain.

== Incumbents ==
- Monarch: Alfonso XIII
- Prime Minister -
  - until 20 July - Francisco Silvela Le Vielleuze
  - 20 July-5 December - Raimundo Fernández Villaverde
  - starting 5 December - Antonio Maura Montaner

== Births ==
- April 24 - José Antonio Primo de Rivera, politician (d. 1936)
- November 11 - Blessed Victoria Díez Bustos de Molina, teacher and religious woman (d. 1936)
