= 1908 in Spain =

- Decades: 1880s; 1890s; 1900s; 1910s; 1920s
- See also: Other events of 1908; List of years in Spain

Events in the year 1908 in Spain.

== Incumbents ==
National level

- Monarch: Alfonso XIII
- President of the Council of Ministers: Antonio Maura
- Minister of Foreign Affairs: Manuel Allendesalazar
- Minister of Justice: Juan Armada Losada
- Minister of War: Fernando Primo de Rivera
- Minister of Finance: Guillermo de Osma y Scull, Cayetano Sánchez Bustillo and Augusto González Besada
- Minister of the Navy: José Ferrándiz y Niño
- Ministro de Gobernación: Juan de la Cierva y Peñafiel
- Minister of Public Instruction: Faustino Rodríguez San Pedro
- Minister of Public Works: Augusto González Besada and José Sánchez Guerra

Cities

- Mayor of Madrid: Nicolás de Peñalver y Zamora
- Mayor of Barcelona: Domènec Sanllehy and Albert Bastardas

== Events ==
- May - The Hispano-French Exposition of 1908 opens in Zaragoza, marking the hundredth anniversary of the first siege of Zaragoza.

== Arts ==
=== Films ===
- El hotel eléctrico, directed by Segundo de Chomón

=== Literature ===
- Vicente Blasco Ibáñez - Blood and Sand (Sangre y arena)
- José Toribio Medina - Los Restos Indígenas de Pichilemu

== Births ==
- 26 June - Estrellita Castro, singer and actress (died 1983)
- 21 October – Jorge Oteiza, painter and sculptor (died 2003)
- 22 October - José Escobar Saliente, comic book writer and artist (died 1994)
- 8 December - Concha Piquer, singer and actress (died 1990)
- 11 December - Carlos Arias Navarro, politician (died 1989)
- date unknown - Miguel García, anarchist (died 1981)

== Deaths ==
- 20 June - Federico Chueca, composer (born 1846)
- 20 September - Pablo de Sarasate, violinist and composer (born 1844)
