= La Luz del Porvenir =

Weekly feminist magazine in Spain (1874–1900)

- Categories: Women's magazine; Feminist magazine
- Frequency: Weekly
- Publisher: Juan Torrents
- Founder: Amalia Domingo Soler
- Founded: 1879
- First issue: 22 May 1879
- Final issue: May 1900
- Country: Spain
- Based in: Barcelona
- Language: Spanish

La Luz del Porvenir (Spanish: The Light of the Future) was a radical feminist weekly magazine which was published in Spain in the period 1879–1900. The magazine was a representative of feminist branch of spiritualism and Fourierist resonances. It was one of the influential feminist magazines in the country.

== History and profile ==
La Luz del Porvenir was established by Amalia Domingo Soler in 1879. Its full title was La Luz del Porvenir: Semanario Espiritista. The first issue appeared on 22 May 1879 in Vila de Gràcia in Barcelona with the support of the director of the La Buena Nueva Spiritist Center, Luis Llach. It was published by Juan Torrents on a weekly basis and adopted a spirist approach. The magazine appeared on Wednesdays and consisted of single-column eight pages with no visual material.

Amalia Domingo Soler also directed the magazine and published her writings on women's rights and secularism. However, her name was not given in the masthead of the magazine. Nearly all contributors of the weekly were women. In addition to publishing articles La Luz del Porvenir acted as a fund-raising body for the poor and encouraged rationalist approaches to secular education. In May 1884 Juan Torrents transferred the ownership and administration of the magazine to Amalia Domingo Soler.

After publishing its first three issues La Luz del Porvenir was suspended by the government for forty-two weeks due to the publication of an article entitled “The idea of God”. Between 8 December 1898 and 24 August 1899 the magazine was also closed down. It folded in May 1900 when it was merged with the magazine of the Kardecist Spiritist Union of Catalonia (Unión Espiritista Kardecista de Cataluña) to form another magazine entitled Luz y unión (Spanish: Light and union).

The Spanish National Library digitized the issues of La Luz del Porvenir covering the years 1884-1888.
