= Ángel Valbuena Prat =

Spanish philologist and historian

- Born: 16 May 1900; Barcelona, Spain
- Died: 2 January 1977 (aged 76); Madrid, Spain
- Occupations: Historian, philologist and author
- Known for: Historia de la literatura española

Ángel Valbuena Prat (16 May 1900 – 2 January 1977) was a Spanish philologist and historian.

== Biography ==
Born in Barcelona, he studied at the University of Barcelona, and later became an assistant professor at the Central University of Madrid. His doctoral thesis, Los Autos Sacramentales de Calderón, earned him various awards. After a tour of various university centers (La Laguna, Puerto Rico, Barcelona, Cambridge), finally, perhaps as a punishment for his political attitudes of Catalan regionalist nature, he was transferred to the University of Murcia, where he remained for more than twenty five years.

His fundamental work is his History of Spanish Literature (Historia de la literatura española), published for the first time in 1937. Many critics pointed out the work's novelty, and the work was reissued up to eight times, the last one of which in 1968, with each edition being re-edited. Thus, this work made Valbuena Prat one of the most prestigious literary historians of the postwar period. Valbuena Prat went one to become one of the greatest Spanish historians of theater.

In addition to this work, Valbuena Prat published numerous studies on Spanish literature throughout his career, among which Algunos aspectos de la moderna poesía canaria (1926), Calderón: su personalidad, su arte dramático, su estilo y sus obras (1941), Historia del teatro español (1956) and Estudios de literatura religiosa española: época medieval y edad de oro (1963), as well as multiple editions of autos sacramentales and comedies of Pedro Calderón de la Barca, who had been the subject of his doctoral thesis.

He also wrote novels, Teófilo (1926) and 2+4 (1927), and poetry books such as Dios sobre la muerte (1939).

== Major works ==
=== Literary Studies ===
- "The Mystery Plays of Calderón", PhD
- "History of Spanish Literature", 1937–1968
- "Some Aspects of Modern Canary Poetry", 1926
- "Calderon: His Personality, His Drama, His Style and His Works", 1941
- "History of Spanish Theater", 1956
- "Studies of Spanish Religious Literature: Medieval and Golden Age", 1963

=== Novels ===
- Teófilo, 1926
- 2+4, 1927

=== Poetry ===
- Dios sobre la muerte, 1939
