= Antolín García =

- Born: 5 April 1928; Barcelona, Spain
- Died: 23 August 1990 (aged 62); Madrid, Spain
- Occupations: Presenter, Personality, Voice actor

Antolín García (5 April 1928 - 23 August 1990) was a Spanish voice actor, television presenter and radio personality.

== Biography ==
He began building engineering studies, which he combined with sport, becoming a University champion of Spain in athletics. He quit studies to begin a career in radio. He started as an apprentice in University radio Radio SEU, and afterwards he began his professional career in Radio Intercontinental, and then in Radio Nacional de España. From 1952, García also worked in dubbing, becoming the Spanish voice of actors like Cary Grant, Glenn Ford, Alain Delon, Peter O'Toole or Albert Finney. He later began his television career in TVE.

He presented different kind of shows, but his specialty were sport broadcasts; among others he covered the 1980 Summer Olympics in Moscow and the 1984 Summer Olympics in Los Angeles.

In 1984, García was dismissed by the management board of TVE due to his connection to advertising company Unipublic.

In 1970, García was handed an Antena de Oro award for his radio work.
