= Adrián Cañas =

Spanish footballer

Personal information
- Full name: Adrián Cañas Ortiz
- Date of birth: 17 June 1992 (age 34)
- Place of birth: Madrid, Spain
- Height: 1.80 m (5 ft 11 in)
- Position: Midfielder

Team information
- Current team: Internacional Madrid

Youth career
- Getafe

Senior career*
Years	Team	Apps	(Gls)
2010–2011	Getafe B	5	(1)
2010	Getafe	0	(0)
2011–2012	Valladolid B	25	(1)
2012–2013	Alcorcón B	27	(1)
2013–2014	Carabanchel	26	(0)
2014–	Internacional Madrid	22	(0)
- * Club domestic league appearances and goals as of 3 April 2015

Adrián Cañas Ortiz (born 17 June 1992) is a Spanish footballer who plays for Internacional de Madrid CF as a midfielder.

== Club career ==
Cañas was born in Madrid, and finished his formation with Getafe CF. He made his senior debuts with the reserves in the 2010–11 campaign, in Segunda División B.

Cañas made his professional debut on 16 December 2010, starting and being booked in a 1–0 home win against BSC Young Boys for the season's UEFA Europa League. He would spend the majority of his spell with the Juvenil and with the B-team, however.

On 25 July 2011 Cañas signed a two-year deal with another reserve team, Real Valladolid B in Tercera División. He subsequently represented clubs in his native community, appearing for AD Alcorcón B, RCD Carabanchel and Internacional de Madrid CF.
