= 1910 in Spain =

- Decades: 1890s; 1900s; 1910s; 1920s; 1930s
- See also: History of Spain; Timeline of Spanish history; List of years in Spain

Events in the year 1910 in Spain.

== Incumbents ==
- Monarch: Alfonso XIII
- Prime Minister: Segismundo Moret (until February); José Canalejas (from February)

== Events ==
- 22 May - A general election results in the Liberal Party, under incumbent prime minister Canalejas, being returned to power.
- 20 August - Crime of Cuenca: The disappearance of José María Grimaldos López leads to the arrest and imprisonment of two men. Grimaldos turns up, alive, in 1926.

== Births ==
- 4 June - Carmen de Gurtubay, noblewoman (died 1959)
- 10 November - Tomás Blanco, film actor (died 1990)
