= Castelnou =

Castelnou, Spain
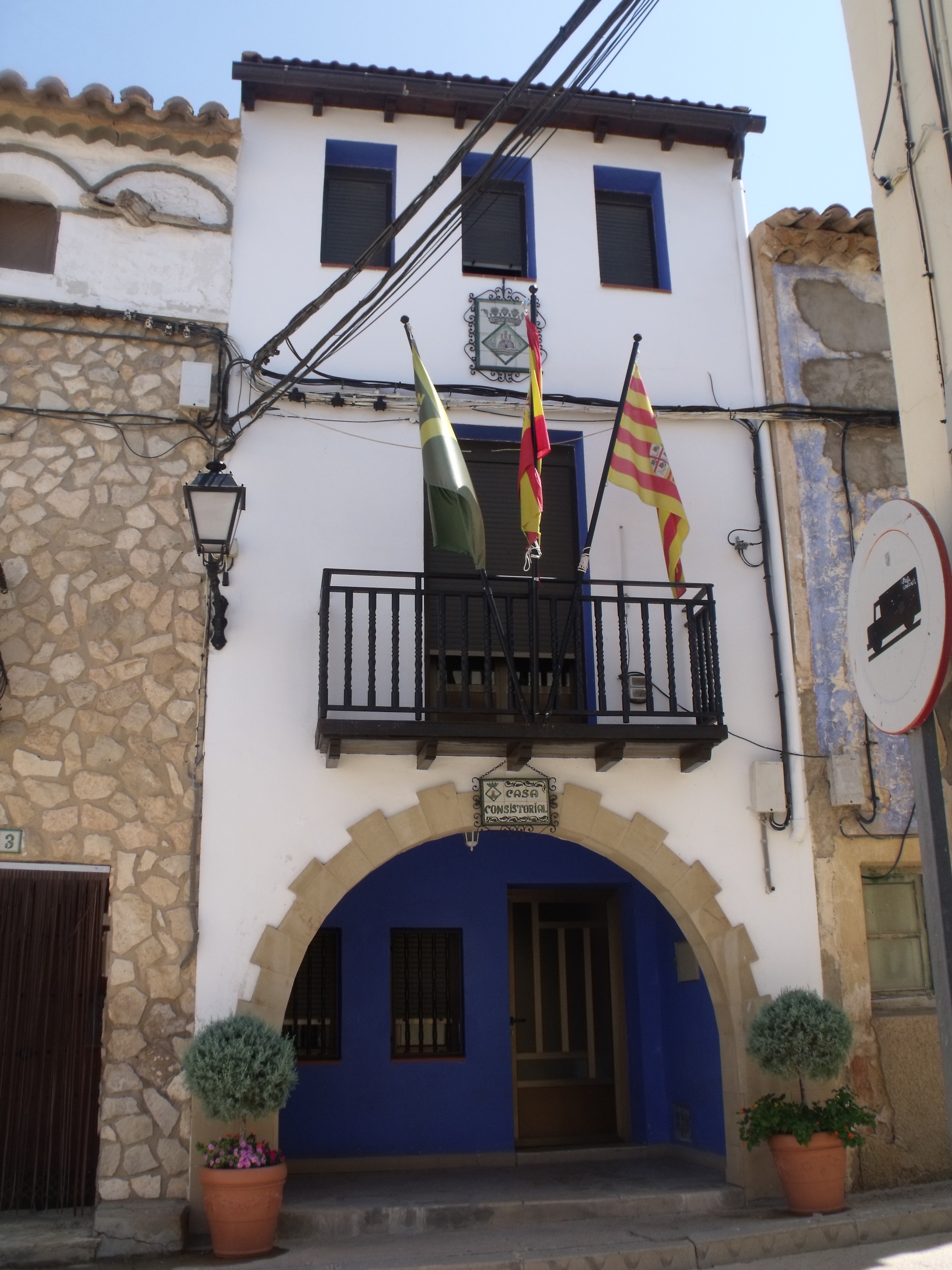
- Town hall

- Flag Coat of arms

- Location within Spain
- Coordinates: 41°14′N 0°22′W
- Country: Spain
- Autonomous community: Aragon
- Province: Teruel
- Municipality: Castelnou

Area
  - Total: 36 km^{2} (14 sq mi)

Population (2025-01-01)
  - Total: 94
  - Density: 2.6/km^{2} (6.8/sq mi)
- Time zone: UTC+1 (CET)
  - Summer (DST): UTC+2 (CEST)

Castelnou is a municipality located in the province of Teruel, Aragon, Spain. According to the 2004 census (INE), the municipality has a population of 109 inhabitants.

The village has acquired some international fame due to the publicity campaign run by the local Mayor, Mr. Esteruelas. He is trying to attract the young with children to their otherwise (literally) dying village to inject new blood, and get the local school and church reopened. Incentives include cheap houses and land, but they cannot fix red-hot summers and chilly winters.

== See also ==
- List of municipalities in Teruel
