= 1972 in Spain =

- Decades: 1950s; 1960s; 1970s; 1980s; 1990s
- See also: Other events of 1972; List of years in Spain

Events in the year 1972 in Spain.

== Incumbents ==
- Caudillo: Francisco Franco

== Births ==
- Montse Ribé.
- 29 February – Pedro Sánchez, Prime Minister of Spain
- 23 March – Víctor Baute, boxer
- 27 March - Ignacio Garrido, golfer
- 1 April - José María Valderas Martínez, Academic General Practitioner and health services researcher
- 13 June - Caridad Rives Arcayna, politician.
- 20 September - Ramon Tribulietx.

== Deaths ==
- 23 March - Cristóbal Balenciaga.
- 20 April – Jorge Mistral, actor (b. 1920)

== See also ==
- List of Spanish films of 1972
