= 1971 in Spain =

- Decades: 1950s; 1960s; 1970s; 1980s; 1990s
- See also: History of Spain; Timeline of Spanish history; List of years in Spain

Events in the year 1971 in Spain.

== Incumbents ==
- Caudillo: Francisco Franco

== Events ==
- 25 - 26 June: Spanish police raid a street of LGBTQ+ friendly businesses and nightclubs in Torremolinos, arresting between one and three hundred people.
- 29 September: the 1971 Spanish general election

== Births ==
- 18 January: Pep Guardiola, football player and manager.
- 11 May: Alberto Rodríguez Librero.
- 28 July: Fernando Teixeira Vitienes.
- 8 November: Carlos Atanes, film director

== Deaths ==
- 1 July:Pepe Brand. (b. 1900)

== See also ==
- List of Spanish films of 1971
