= 1907 in Spain =

- Decades: 1880s; 1890s; 1900s; 1910s; 1920s
- See also: Other events of 1907; List of years in Spain

Events in the year 1907 in Spain.

== Incumbents ==
- Monarch: Alfonso XIII
- President of the Government: Antonio Aguilar Correa (until 25 January), Antonio Maura Montaner (starting 25 January)

== Births ==
- February 21 - José González, sport shooter
- March 4 - Maria Branyas, supercentenarian, world's oldest living person from January 17, 2023, to August 19, 2024 (born in the United States) (d. 2024)
- March 18 - Luis Gabriel Portillo, aristocrat (d. 1993)

== Deaths ==
- Emilio Sánchez Perrier, painter (b. 1855)
