= Isabel Cheix =

Isabel Cheix Martinez (18 January 1839 – 6 August 1899) was a Spanish writer and poet born in Málaga, in the province of Andalucia. She wrote a number of historical, religious and romantic novels under the pseudonym of Martín Ávila, as well as poetry and several stage plays. She received a number of literary awards during her life.

== Early life ==
Isabel Cheix was one of eight children born to Don Santiago Cheix and Doña María Amparo Martínez. Her father was a well-educated, wealthy mining engineer, who moved between Almería, Málaga and Seville. She was educated in Almería, but moved at an early age to Seville, where she spent her life and where she wrote, at age nine, her first poem Al Lucero de la Mañana (To the Morning Star). Her three short dramatic pieces called Violeta, Magdalena and La Tia Lechuza were written around 1896 but did not reach the stage during her lifetime.

When Cheix was 19 years old her mother died and she took upon herself the task of caring for her seven siblings, all younger than her. She had to suspend her literary activities and dedicate herself to the care of her family and home. She spent her life between domestic tasks and what she called her “childhood hobby”. Five years later her father died. To earn money she started painting landscapes, a skill learned in her educative years, and she was able to sell these and maintain a reasonable lifestyle for the family.

== Literary life ==
She acquired prestige in Seville among the intellectuals of that time and was permitted to collaborate in journalistic work for La Semana Católica, Revista Compostelana, La Moda Elegante, Asta Regia (Jaén), El Folletín (Málaga), and Sevilla Mariana. She wrote “I only understand happiness in the practice of virtue”.

Cheix started publishing her poems in the local press in Málaga and took part in different literary competitions trying all kinds of genres. Lyric poetry was her preferred genre but this was combined with poems in newer themes of patriotism, often together with the condemnation of war and the deep desire for peace. She also carefully developed a religious theme and would be the only one of her generation to attempt the biographical genre, specifically, hagiography.

The first work that she entered in a competition was El Caballero de Napoles, submitted to the Academia Bibliográfica Mariana in Lleida in 1868. It won first prize. This result encouraged her and she went on to win 9 more prizes and awards in that completion. Cheix also competed in the Academia Sevillana de Buenas Letras and won 5 times, she also won literary awards in Murcia, Málaga, Vitoria and Manila with various poems, articles and novels.

In 1882 Cheix entered a competition sponsored by the Escuela Normal de Buenas Letras in Seville, her theme was “Should women be educated?”. The article won a gold and pearl medal. In the same year she won another gold medal in a literary competition in Manila with an article about Saint Theresa. Cheix went on to develop her article into a book about the life of St Theresa called La Reformadora del Carmelo. She died in Seville, Spain, aged 60.

Selected bibliography

Books:

- La Cruz del Valle - poems 1894
- Al Lucero de la Mañana
- Narraciones Infantiles with Alvaro Lopez Nuñez
- La Reformadora de Carmelo, The story of St. Theresa de Jesus. 1893
- Romancero de Don Pedro I de Castilla 1898
- Jornadas de Belén 1867
- Estrella del Mar, Historia de la Virgen Maria, instrucciones familiares dedicada a las niñas. 1872
- El lirio de los valles: La Virgen de Valvanera. 1902
- La Madre Vicenta María Lopez y Vicuña [fundadora del Instituto de María Inmaculada para el Servicio Doméstico] 1898
- La Romería del Rocío
- El Plato de China

Poems:

- La Cruz del Valle 1894
- Al Lucero de la Mañana
- Los Dolores de la Santisima Virgen
- La Muerte de Cervantes

Short plays:

- Magdalena: A drama in one act divided into three scenes. 1896
- Violeta: Comedy in one act in verse. 1906
- La Tia Lechuza.
