= List of Spanish films of 1975 =

A list of films produced in Spain in 1975 (see 1975 in film).

== 1975 ==
Title	Director	Cast	Genre	Notes
1975
Eva, ¿qué hace ese hombre en tu cama?	Tulio Demichelli	Manolo Escobar, Paca Gabaldón, Iris Chacón, Jorge Lavat	Comedy	Mexican co-production
Furtivos	José Luis Borau	Ovidi Montllor, Lola Gaos	Drama	
The Great House	Francisco Rodríguez Gordillo			Entered into the 25th Berlin International Film Festival
La Maldicion de la Bestia	Miguel Iglesias	Paul Naschy	Horror	
Metralleta 'Stein'	José Antonio de la Loma		Thriller	
Night of the Seagulls			Horror	
Pantaleón y las Visitadoras	Mario Vargas Llosa	José Sacristán, Katy Jurado, Rosa Carmina	Comedy	Mexican co-production
Pim, pam, pum... ¡fuego!	Pedro Olea	Josep Maria Flotats, Concha Velasco, Fernando Fernán Gómez	Drama	One of the first films about Spanish Maquis
La trastienda	Jorge Grau	María José Cantudo, Frederick Stafford, Rosanna Schiaffino	Drama	Huge success; polemic film about Opus Dei; first female naked body in Spanish film (María J. Cantudo)
The Regent's Wife	Gonzalo Suárez			Entered into the 9th Moscow International Film Festival
