= 1988 in Spain =

- Decades: 1960s; 1970s; 1980s; 1990s; 2000s
- See also: Other events of 1988; List of years in Spain

The following lists events that happened during 1988 in Spain.

== Incumbents ==
- Monarch: Juan Carlos I
- Prime Minister: Felipe González

== Events ==
- 29 May: In the 1988 Catalan regional election, Jordi Pujol retains the regional presidency.
- 14 December: The 1988 Spanish general strike ("14-D") takes place, in opposition to government economic reforms.

== Sports ==
- 2 October: The Spanish Grand Prix takes place at the Circuito Permanente de Jerez, Jerez de la Frontera, and is won by Alain Prost of France.

== Births ==
- 8 January: Adrián López, footballer
- 3 March: Rafael Muñoz, swimmer
- 14 April: Roberto Bautista Agut, tennis player
- 28 April: Juan Mata, footballer
- 16 July: Sergio Busquets, footballer
- 7 October: Diego Costa, footballer
- 17 October: Marina Salas, actress
- 21 October: Blanca Suárez, Spanish actress

== Deaths ==
- 14 November: Julia Caba Alba, actress. (b. 1902)
- 27 November: Carmen Carbonell, actress (b. 1900)
- 26 December: Pablo Sorozábal, composer (b. 1897)

== See also ==
- 1988 in Spanish television
- List of Spanish films of 1988
