= Enrique Truan =

Spanish composer

Enrique Truan (1905 – 1 August 1995) was a Spanish composer.

== Life and career ==
Enrique Truan was born in 1905 in Gijón, Asturias. He studied at the Superior Municipal Conservatory in Barcelona between 1924 and 1931, with teachers Morena, Canals and Alfonso. He then dedicated himself to teaching. He began his activity as a composer with two concerts from his own works (Gijón and Langreo Philharmonic). He was the director of the School of Music in Gijón from 1948 to 1970, Fellow Member of the Institute of Asturian Studies and Honorary Member of the Ateneo Jovellanos in Gijón.

In 1950 he premiered Cantata del Sacramento (Sacramento Cantata); in 1951, Representación del Nacimiento de Nuestro Señor (Representation of the Nativity of Our Lord); in 1966, Misa de Gaita (Piper's Mass) in the parish church of San Pedro de Gijón. He gave recitals of his songs together with Celia A. White, which also included works for piano, in León, Santander, Oviedo and Gijón.

In 1976, he was appointed Fellow of the Institute of Asturian Studies, where he presented his work, from his own funds, for voice and piano: From Las Verdes Asturias (Pórtico al Mar y Seis pinturas líricas) (lit. 'Gate to the Sea and Six lyrical paintings') published on his own. In 1982 he opened his work Miraglo de Albelda in Oviedo and Gijón Albelda, of an almost one-hour duration, with the RTVE Orchestra, conducted by Maestro Odon Alonso and participation from the Oviedo City Polyphonic Chapel and the Polyphonic Gijonesa "A. Solar" Choirs.

== Works ==
As a composer, Enrique Truan has an extensive musical work of over 248 works to his credit, covering different genres: choruses, cantatas, works for piano, violin and piano and guitar as well as 122 works for voice and piano on poems by Lope de Vega, Gil Vicente, Rubén Darío, Miguel de Unamuno, Rafael Alberti, Federico García Lorca, Juan Ramón Jiménez, Antonio Machado, Leopoldo Panero, Ángel González, Miguel Ángel Bonhome, F. Roces, Carmina Suáres, V. Rivas, and others.

He has works published in the J. & W. Ed Chester of London (his Three castizo preludes, 1950). In Madrid, his Four songs of Garcia Lorca in Mus Ed. Modern Announces (1965), and other works in Caracas and Gijón. His work has appeared on recordings of the Philips discography label, Columbia Phonograph Company and Asturiana. National Radio has recorded some of his works with texts by Miguel de Unamuno, Gonzalez, Miguel Angel Bonhome, Federico Garcia Lorca and V. Rivas.
