= 2000 in Spanish television =

This is a list of Spanish television related events in 2000.

== Events ==
- Unknown: TV channel Radio Television Ceuta starts broadcasting.
- 1 April: Television channel Canal Parlamento starts broadcasting.
- 23 April: Telecinco premieres Big Brother, a true mass phenomenon, which will open a debate on the ethical limits of television. Reality shows will become the most viewed TV shows for the next two decades.
- 12 May: Javier González Ferrari is appointed General Director of RTVE.
- 19 May: TV channel Factoria de Ficcion starts broadcasting.
- 10 September: TV channel MTV starts broadcasting.
- 15 September: TV channel Canal Panda starts broadcasting.

== Debuts ==
| Title | Channel | Debut | Performers/Host | Genre |
|---|---|---|---|---|
| 2.mil | La 2 | 2000-10-08 | | Science/Culture |
| A ciencia cierta | La 2 | 2000-01-24 | Esteban Sánchez-Ocaña | Science/Culture |
| A pedir de boca | La 2 | 2000-08-10 | Rafael Romero San José | Cooking Show |
| Abierto 24 horas | Antena 3 | 2000-01-05 | Pilar Bardem | Sitcom |
| Ahora | Antena 3 | 2000-07-10 | Cristina Saavedra | Variety Show |
| ¡Ala... Dina! | La 1 | 2000-01-04 | Paz Padilla | Sitcom |
| Antena 3 Directo | Antena 3 | 2000-02-07 | Curro Castillo | TV Shop |
| Antivicio | Antena 3 | 2000-04-18 | Carmen Elías | Drama Series |
| Aquí hay trabajo | La 2 | 2000-11-06 | Yolanda Vázquez | Public Service |
| Audacia | La 1 | 2000-10-19 | Jordi Estadella | Quiz Show |
| Audiencia pública | Antena 3 | 2000-02-07 | Javier Nart | Talking Show |
| Buenas tardes | Telecinco | 2000-11-27 | Nuria Roca | Variety Show |
| Movies español en canal + | Canal+ | 2000-01-27 | | Movies |
| Cruz y raya.com | La 1 | 2000-10-06 | Cruz y Raya | Comedy |
| Cultura con ñ | La 2 | 2000-01-22 | | Science/Culture |
| ¿De qué hablan las mujeres? | Antena 3 | 2000-06-18 | Jesús Vázquez | Talk show |
| Días de tele | Telecinco | 2000-01-15 | Silvia Ruiz | Variety Show |
| El anfitrión | Telecinco | 2000-09-24 | Boris Izaguirre | Talk Show |
| El botones Sacarino | La 1 | 2000-12-26 | Jorge Roelas | Sitcom |
| El burladero | La 1 | 2000-10-13 | Josema Yuste | Comedy |
| El bus | Antena 3 | 2000-09-15 | Inés Ballester | Reality show |
| El cine de tu vida | La 1 | 2000-06-21 | | Movies |
| El conciertazo | La 1 | 2000-03-04 | Fernando Argenta | Music |
| El Gran Splash | La 1 | 2000-06-24 | David Meca | Game Show |
| El grupo | Telecinco | 2000-09-17 | Héctor Alterio | Drama Series |
| El lugar del crimen | Antena 3 | 2000-02-23 | Mon Santiso | News Magazine |
| El Marqués de Sotoancho | Antena 3 | 2000-11-03 | Josema Yuste | Sitcom |
| El mejor cine de siempre | La 1 | 2000-06-10 | | Movies |
| El mundo en 24 horas | La 1 | 2000-09-30 | | News |
| El patito feo | Antena 3 | 2000-01-15 | Ana Obregón | Variety Show |
| El rayo | Antena 3 | 2000-09-18 | Inma del Moral | Comedy |
| El traspiés | Antena 3 | 2000-12-29 | Mar Saura | Comedy |
| Emisión impossible | Telecinco | 2000-07-01 | Bermúdez | Comedy |
| Enréd@te | La 2 | 2000-11-10 | Pilar Socorro | Science/Culture |
| España en comunidad | La 2 | 2000-12-01 | Patricia Betancort | News |
| España solidaria | La 2 | 2000-06-18 | | Variety Show |
| Eurocanción | La 1 | 2000-02-08 | Carlos Lozano | Music |
| Fugitivos en la ciudad | Antena 3 | 2000-09-30 | Alonso Caparrós | Game Show |
| Big Brother | Telecinco | 2000-04-23 | Mercedes Milá | Reality show |
| Historias de hoy | Telecinco | 2000-04-21 | Paloma Ferre | Variety Show |
| Historias de niños | La 2 | 2000-08-16 | | Documentary |
| Hospital Central | Telecinco | 2000-04-30 | Jordi Rebellón | Drama Series |
| Comedy se escribe con H | La 1 | 2000-04-08 | Andoni Ferreño | Comedy |
| Jacinto Durante, representante | La 1 | 2000-01-12 | Javier Manrique | Sitcom |
| La botica de Txumari | Antena 3 | 2000-01-24 | Txumari Alfaro | Science/Culture |
| La casa de tus sueños | La 1 | 2000-01-21 | Nuria Roca | Game Show |
| La central | Antena 3 | 2000-09-18 | Jesús Vázquez | Late Night |
| La escalera mecánica | La 1 | 2000-02-16 | Jordi González | Late Night |
| La Ley y la vida | La 1 | 2000-09-11 | Toni Cantó | Drama Series |
| La noche de los errores | Antena 3 | 2000-06-02 | Josema Yuste | Comedy |
| Los excluidos | La 2 | 2000-05-21 | Carmen Sarmiento | Documentary |
| Los pueblos | La 2 | 2000-08-12 | | Documentary |
| Made in America | Antena 3 | 2000-10-16 | | Movies |
| Monstruo noticia | Telecinco | 2000-04-02 | | Children |
| Música culta | La 2 | 2000-01-22 | | Music |
| Música en familia | La 1 | 2000-12-01 | José Manuel Parada | Music |
| No va más | Canal+ | 2000-09-30 | Juan Pablo Enis | Science/Culture |
| Nuestro cine | Canal+ | 2000-01-18 | | Movies |
| Paraíso | La 1 | 2000-07-25 | Luis Fernando Alvés | Drama Series |
| Pasapalabra | Antena 3 | 2000-07-24 | Silvia Jato | Quiz Show |
| Pokémon Manía | Telecinco | 2000-07-17 | Aarón Guerrero | Children |
| Policías, en el corazón de la calle | Antena 3 | 2000-01-11 | José María Pou | Drama Series |
| Puro y jondo | La 2 | 2000-07-18 | | Music |
| Qué ocurrió | La 1 | 2000-10-02 | Julio César Iglesias | Variety Show |
| Quédate conmigo | Telecinco | 2000-06-08 | Ely del Valle | Reality Show |
| ¿Quién dijo miedo? | Antena 3 | 2000-04-29 | Alonso Caparrós | Quiz Show |
| Raquel busca su sitio | La 1 | 2000-01-17 | Leonor Watling | Drama Series |
| Robles, investigador | La 1 | 2000-11-13 | Antonio Resines | Drama Series |
| Showmatch | Antena 3 | 2000-09-17 | Antonio Hidalgo | Comedy |
| Survivor | Telecinco | 2000-09-10 | Juan Manuel López Iturriaga | Reality show |
| Todo nieve | La 2 | 2000-01-20 | | News |
| Trip | Antena 3 | 2000-09-30 | | Docudrama |
| Tu gran día | La 1 | 2000-07-07 | Lolita Flores | Talent show |
| Un chupete para ella | Antena 3 | 2000-09-10 | Juanjo Puigcorbé | Sitcom |
| Web te ve | Antena 3 | 2000-07-28 | Lucía Riaño | Science/Culture |
| Zoorprendente | Antena 3 | 2000-05-20 | Víctor Serrano | Videos |

== Television shows ==
- La 1
  - Telediario (1957– )
  - Estudio estadio (1972–2005)
  - Informe Semanal (1973– )
  - Parlamento (1978–2014)
  - Telepasión española (1990– )
  - Corazón, Corazón (1993–2010)
  - Cartelera (1994–2009)
  - Los Desayunos de TVE (1994–2020)
  - Cine de barrio (1995– )
  - Mitomanía (1995–2001)
  - El Grand Prix del verano (1995–2005)
  - Gente (1995–2011)
  - Corazón (1997– )
  - Música sí (1997–2004)
  - Saber vivir (1997–2009)
  - Todo en familia (1999–2001)
  - TPH Club (1999–2003)
  - Noche de fiesta (1999–2004)
- La 2
  - Al filo de lo imposble (1982– )
  - Pueblo de Dios (1982– )
  - Últimas preguntas (1983– )
  - En portada (1984– )
  - Estadio 2 (1984–2007)
  - Metrópolis (1985– )
  - Documentos TV (1986– )
  - Tendido cero (1986– )
  - Días de cine (1991– )
  - Línea 900 (1991–2007)
  - La Aventura del saber (1992– )
  - Jara y sedal (1992– )
  - Zona ACB (1993–2010)
  - Bricomanía (1994–2004)
  - La 2 noticias (1994–2020)
  - La noche temática, (1995– )
  - ¡Qué grande es el cine! (1995–2005)
  - Redes (1996–2013)
  - Agrosfera (1997– )
  - El escarabajo verde (1997– )
  - Saber y ganar (1997– )
  - América total (1997–2004)
  - A su salud (1997–2004)
  - Negro sobre blanco (1997–2004)
  - Noche abierta, La (1997–2004)
  - El Tercer grado (1997–2004)
  - La Botica de la abuela (1997–2006)
  - En otras palabras (1997–2008)
  - La Mandrágora (1997–2009)
  - El Cine de La 2 (1998– )
  - Versión española (1998– )
  - Al habla (1998–2004)
  - Escuela del deporte (1999–2005)
- Antena 3
  - Antena 3 Noticias (1990– )
  - Telemaratón (1993–2001)
  - En buenas manos (1994–2005)
  - Lluvia de estrellas (1995–2001)
  - Club Megatrix (1995–2013)
  - Espejo público (1996– )
  - La Parodia nacional (1996–2001)
  - Menudas estrellas (1996–2002)
  - El Primer café (1996–2003)
  - Furor (1998–2001)
  - Manos a la obra (1998–2001)
  - Compañeros (1998–2002)
  - Sabor a ti (1998–2004)
  - Noche de impacto (1998–2005)
  - Mírame (1999–2001)
  - Desesperado Club Social (1999–2002)
  - Trato hecho (1999–2002)
  - Como la vida (1999–2004)
  - El club de la comedia (1999–2005)
- Telecinco
  - Informativos Telecinco (1990– )
  - Día a día (1996–2004)
  - Caiga quien caiga (1996–2008)
  - Moros y cristianos (1997–2001)
  - Al salir de clase (1997–2002)
  - Crónicas marcianas (1997–2005)
  - El Juego del euromillón (1998–2001)
  - El Informal (1998–2002)
  - Periodistas (1998–2002)
  - La Mirada crítica (1998–2009)
  - La Gran ilusión (1999–2002)
  - ¿Quiere ser millonario? (1999–2004)
  - 7 vidas (1999–2006)
  - El comisario (1999–2009)
  - Nosolomúsica (1999–2012)
- Canal+
  - El día después (1990–2005)
  - Redacción (1990–2005)
  - Lo + plus (1995–2005)
  - Las noticias del guiñol (1995–2005)
  - Magacine (1996–2005)

== Ending this year ==
- La 1
  - Barrio Sésamo (1979–2000)
  - ¿Qué apostamos? (1993–2000)
  - Calle nueva (1997–2000)
  - Peque Prix (1998–2000)
- La 2
  - Un País en la mochila (1995–2000)
  - Empléate a fondo (1996–2000)
  - Quatro (1997–2000)
  - Lo tuyo es puro teatro (1998–2000)
- Antena 3
  - La casa de los líos (1996–2000)
  - Alta tensión (1998–2000)
  - Nada es para siempre (1998–2000)
  - El cronómetro (1999–2000)
  - El tiempo pasa, corazón (1999–2000)
  - Ver para creer (1999–2000)
- Telecinco
  - Mediterráneo (1999–2000)

== Foreign series debuts in Spain ==
| English title | Spanish title | Original title | Channel | Country | Performers |
|---|---|---|---|---|---|
| Amazon | Perdidos en el Amazonas | | La 1 | CAN | C. Thomas Howell |
| C-16: FBI | C16 | | La 1 | USA | Eric Roberts |
| Digimon Adventure | Digimon | Dejimon Adobenchā | La 1 | JAP | |
| Futurama | Futurama | | Antena 3 | USA | |
| Jesse | Jesse | | Canal + | USA | Christina Applegate |
| Majokko Tickle | Cosquillas mágicas | Majokko Chikkuru | Antena 3 | JAP | |
| Malcolm in the Middle | Malcolm in the Middle | | Antena 3 | USA | Frankie Muniz |
| --- | María Emilia: Querida | María Emilia: Querida | La 1 | PER | Coraima Torres |
| --- | La mentira | La mentira | La 1 | MEX | Kate del Castillo |
| Miami 7 | S Club 7 | | La 1 | UK | Tina Barrett |
| Ned and Stacey | Ned y Stacey | | FORTA | USA | Thomas Haden Church, Debra Messing |
| New York Undercover | Sombras de Nueva York | | La 1 | USA | Malik Yoba |
| Noah's Ark | El arca de Noé | | La 2 | USA | Jon Voight, Mary Steenburgen |
| Once a Thief | Matar a un ladrón | | Telecinco | CAN | Ivan Sergei |
| Pearl | Pearl | | FORTA | USA | Rhea Perlman |
| Sliders | Salto al infinito | | La 2 | USA | Jerry O'Connell |
| Solomon | Salomón | | Antena 3 | USA | Ben Cross |
| The George Wendt Show | El show de George Wendt | | La 2 | USA | George Wendt |
| The Marshal | Marshal | | Antena 3 | USA | Jeff Fahey |
| The Net | La Red | | Canal + | USA | Brooke Langton |
| The Pretender | The Pretender | | Antena 3 | USA | Michael T. Weiss |
| Third Watch | Turno de guardia | | Telecinco | USA | Michael Beach |
| Walking with Dinosaurs | Caminando entre dinosaurios | | Telecinco | USA | |
| Young Hercules | El joven Hércules | | La 1 | USA | Ryan Gosling |

== Births ==
- 19 March – Carlota García, actress.
- 30 June – Ainhoa Larrañaga, actress.

== Deaths ==
- 28 April – Miguel Armario, actor, 84.
- 24 May – Arturo López, actor, 66.
- 5 July – Blanca Álvarez, hostess, 70.
- 7 July – Felipe Mellizo, journalist, 67.
- 16 October – Antonio Ferrandis, actor, 79.
- 26 October – Jesús Puente, actor and host, 69.

== See also ==
- 2000 in Spain
- List of Spanish films of 2000
