= 2000 in Spain =

- Decades: 1980s; 1990s; 2000s; 2010s; 2020s
- See also: Other events of 2000; List of years in Spain

The following lists events that happened in the year 2000 in Spain.

== Incumbents ==
- Monarch: Juan Carlos I
- Prime Minister: José María Aznar

== Events ==
- March - Aznar's Popular Party won the general election in a landslide victory.
- April 25 - Aznar took the presidential oath in front of parliament.
- Average annual Spanish wage set at €29,225.

== Sports ==
- Spanish cyclist Joane Somarriba wins the Grande Boucle for the first of three times.
- José Antonio Camacho coaches the Española de Fútbol team to the Euro 2000 Quarter Finals.

== Births ==
- January 26 — Ester Expósito, actress
- January 31 — Hugo Guillamón, footballer
- February 29 — Ferran Torres, footballer
- June 27 — Rafa García, professional basketball player
- September 9 — Victoria de Marichalar y Borbón, daughter of the Duchess of Lugo, The Infanta Elena of Spain and Jaime de Marichalar.

== Deaths ==
- February 5 – José García Hernández (born 1915), politician
- June 6 – Andrés Reguera (born 1930), politician
- April 29 —Antonio Buero Vallejo (born 1916), playwright
- July 23 — Carmen Martín Gaite (born 1925), writer

== See also ==
- 2000 in Spanish television
- List of Spanish films of 2000
