= Bellpuig railway station =

Railway station in Bellpuig, Spain

Coordinates: 41°37′57.70″N 1°00′46.75″E

Bellpuig
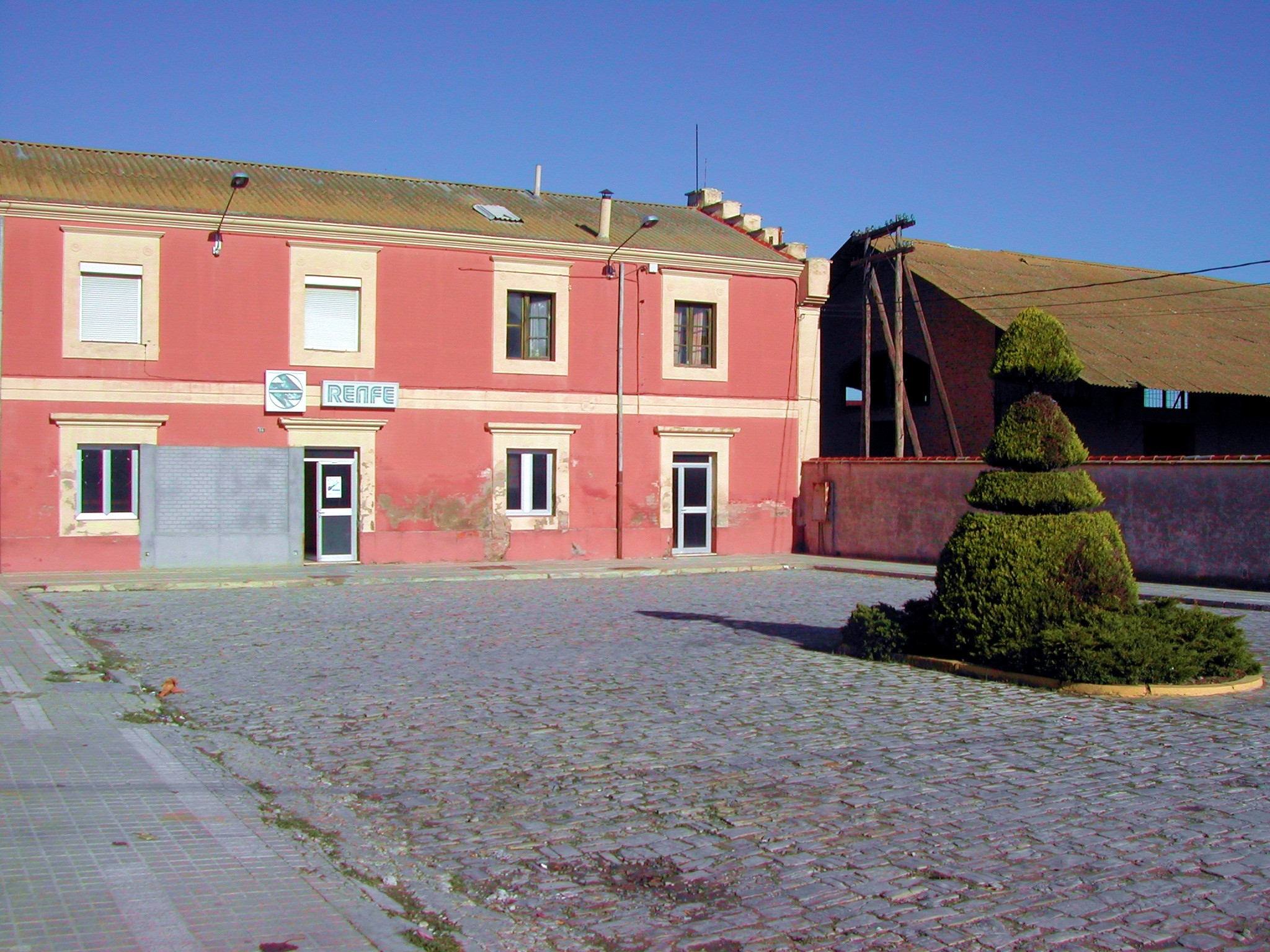

General information
- Location: Bellpuig; Catalonia; Spain
- System: Rodalies de Catalunya regional rail station
- Owner: Adif
- Operator: Renfe Operadora
- Line: Lleida–Manresa–Barcelona (PK 32.4)
- Platforms: 1 side platform
- Tracks: 1

Construction
- Structure type: At grade

Services
Preceding station	Rodalies de Catalunya	Following station
Anglesola towards L'Hospitalet de Llobregat	R12	Castellnou de Seana towards Lleida Pirineus
Location

Bellpuig is a Rodalies de Catalunya station serving Bellpuig in Catalonia, Spain. It is owned by Adif and served by regional line R12.

The station is served daily by six trains to Lleida and five trains to Cervera, three of which continue towards L'Hospitalet de Llobregat via Barcelona.
