= Granollers (surname) =

Granollers is a surname. Notable people with the surname include:

- Gerard Granollers (born 1989), Spanish tennis player, brother of Marcel
- Inés Granollers (born 1970), Spanish politician
- Marcel Granollers (born 1986), Spanish tennis player, brother of Gerard

== See also ==
- Granollers
