= Jan Pomés =

Spanish politician (born 1996)

Jan Pomés-López
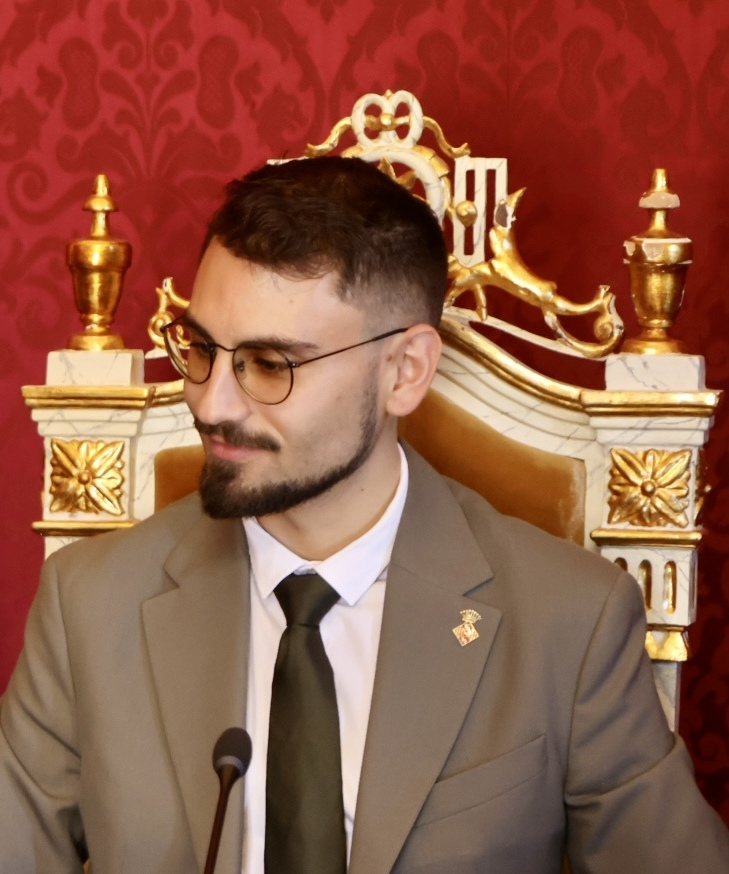
- Pomés in 2025

Mayor of Cervera
- Incumbent
- Assumed office 17 June 2023

Senator of the Kingdom of Spain
- Incumbent
- Assumed office 23 July 2023

Personal details
- Born: 19 May 1996 (age 30) Cervera, La Segarra, Catalonia, Spain
- Party: Socialists' Party of Catalonia
- Education: Autonomous University of Barcelona (UAB) and National University of Distance Education (UNED)
- Website: cervera.cat

Jan Pomés-López (born 19 May 1996) is a Spanish politician serving as a member of the Senate since 2023. He has served as mayor of Cervera since 2023.

== Early life and education ==
Pomés-López was born in Cervera, the capital of the comarca of La Segarra (Lleida), on 19 May 1996. He read for a degree in Political Science and Public Administration, with a specialisation in International Relations, at the Autonomous University of Barcelona (UAB), graduating in 2019. During his undergraduate studies, he undertook international academic exchanges at the University of Akureyri (Iceland) and the Universidade Nova de Lisboa (Portugal), as well as further training at the Complutense University of Madrid.

In 2022, he completed a Master's degree in European Union Studies at the National Distance Education University (UNED), specialising in European Community law and space policy.

== Professional and associative career ==
Prior to entering institutional politics, Pomés developed a prominent career within the organised Europeanist movement. Between 2019 and 2021 he served as Director of the Spanish Federal Council of the European Movement (CFEME), the foremost organisation in Spain devoted to promoting European integration. He also served as President of Young European Federalists in Spain across two separate terms: 2019–2021 and 2022–2023.

Between 2021 and 2023 he assumed the role of Technical Secretary of the Catalan Council of the European Movement, an entity within the European network promoting federalism and continental integration.

In 2024, he co-organised the Cervera Seminar on Spain's presence and contribution to the Council of Europe, for whose resulting publication he authored the preface.

== Political career ==
=== Candidacy for the Mayoralty of Cervera (2023) ===
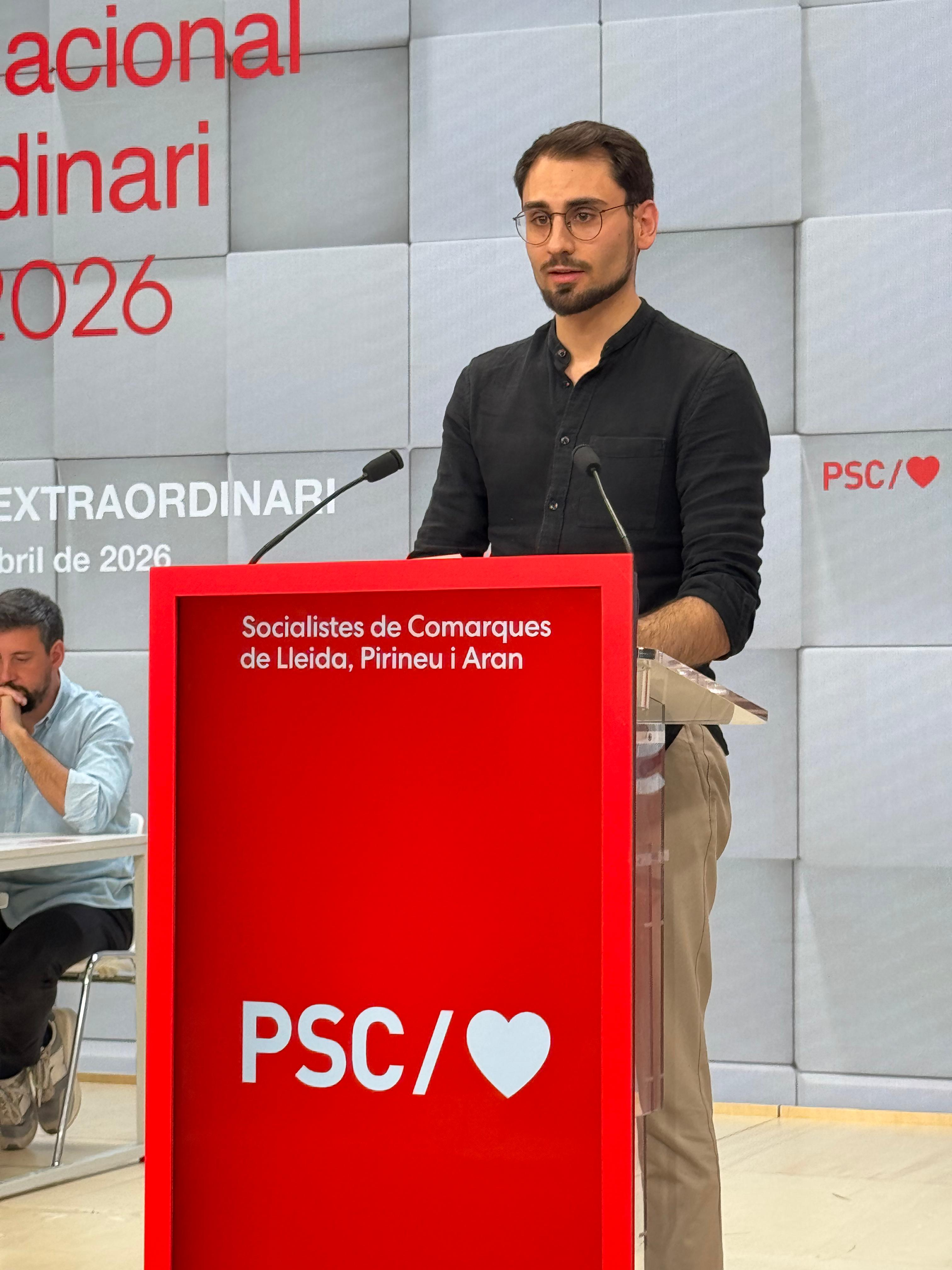
Jan speaking at Catalan Socialist Party internal forums

In January 2023, Pomés was announced as the PSC's lead candidate for the municipal elections in Cervera, succeeding the incumbent Socialist councillor Raimond Fusté. In his presentation address, he advocated for a "progressive, open, inclusive, cross-cutting and cross-generational project" for the city.

==== Municipal elections of 28 May 2023 ====
Pomés led the PSC-CP list at the municipal elections of 28 May 2023, in which the PSC secured 5 councillors with 31.18% of the vote (926 votes), becoming the most voted party in Cervera. It was the first occasion in the democratic era that the PSC had won the municipal elections in Cervera.

==== Investiture as Mayor (17 June 2023) ====
On 17 June 2023, at the constitutive sitting of the new council held in the Plenary Chamber of the Paeria, Pomés was invested as Mayor with 8 votes in favour: the 5 from the PSC and the 3 from Junts per Cervera, granting him an absolute majority among the 13 councillors. He received the ceremonial staff (vara) from the outgoing Mayor (ERC).

At 27 years of age, he became the youngest mayor of a comarca capital in the Ponent region. He formed a coalition government with Junts per Cervera, with the foundations of the agreement resting upon what he described as "trust and honesty".

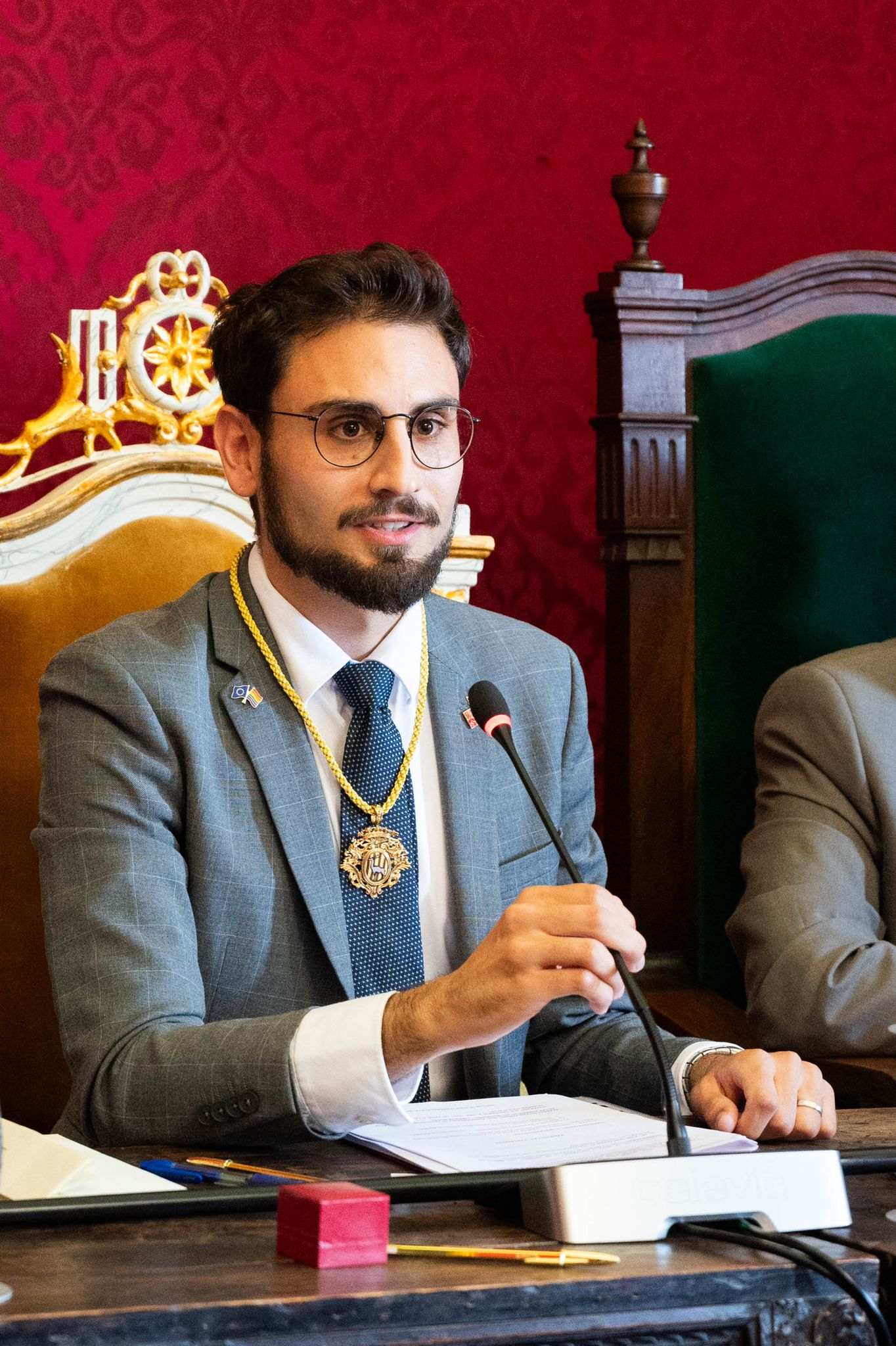
Jan Pomés is sworn in as Mayor of Cervera during the official inauguration ceremony, marking the beginning of his term in office

=== Senator for Lleida, Pyrenees and Aran (from July 2023) ===
At the general elections of 23 July 2023, Pomés was elected Senator for the constituencies of Lleida, Pyrenees and Aran representing the PSC (Socialist Parliamentary Group), within the XV Legislature.

=== Senate committee activity and contributions ===
Across his four committee memberships, Pomés has developed a distinctive parliamentary profile combining European economic governance, foreign affairs, environmental policy and local government advocacy.

Committee on Economy, Trade and Enterprise (Second Vice-president): In his capacity as Second Vice-president, Pomés has participated in the committee's oversight of Spain's macroeconomic performance, trade policy and enterprise competitiveness, in keeping with the committee's role in scrutinising the government's economic strategy and European economic commitments.

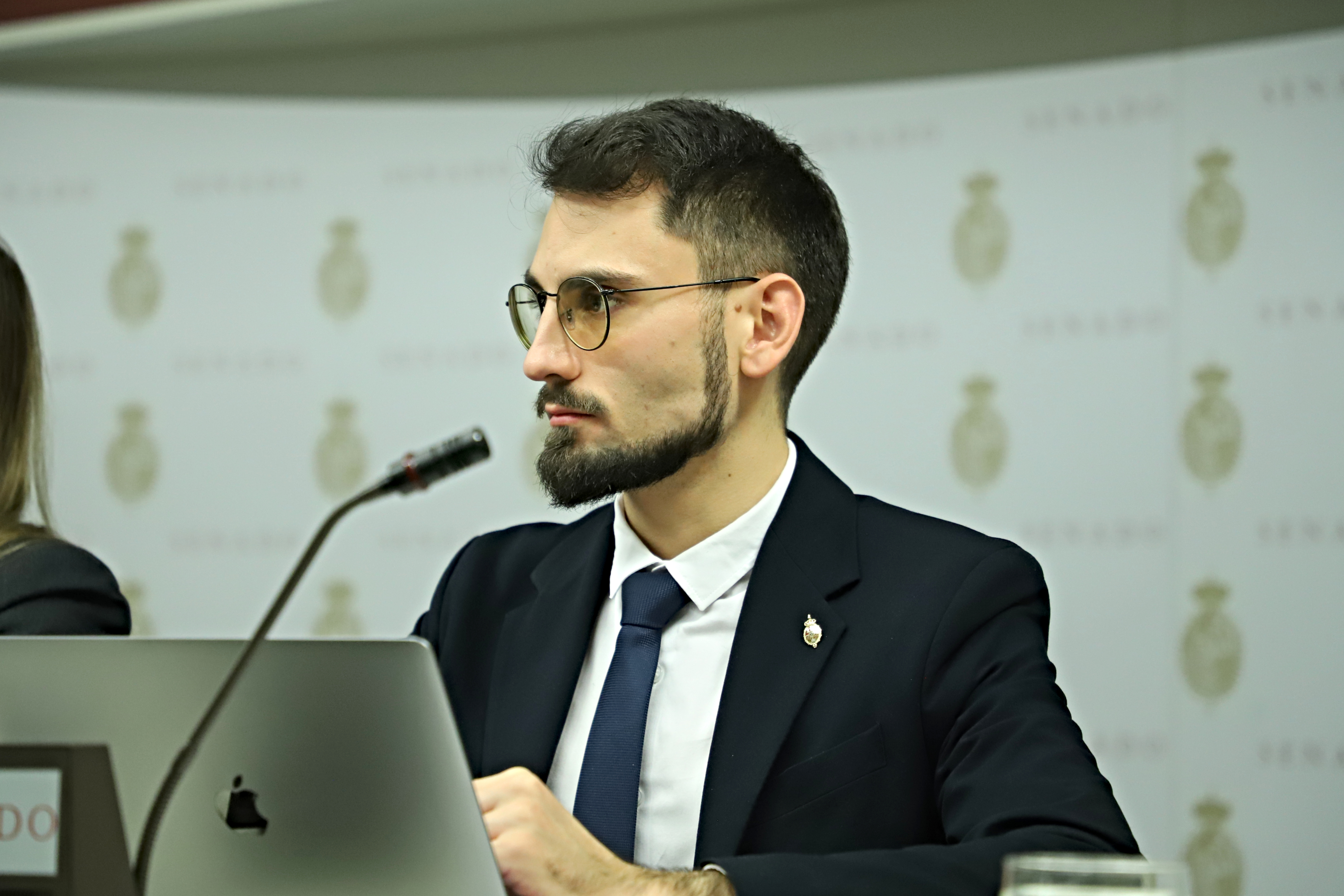
Jan at the Foreign Affairs Committee

Committee on Foreign Affairs (Second Secretary): As Second Secretary of the Foreign Affairs Committee, Pomés holds one of the senior administrative positions of the committee's Mesa (steering bureau), presiding over meetings in the absence of senior officers and co-signing official documents and correspondence. His work in this committee has focused on parliamentary diplomacy, Spain's relations with Central Asia and the Western Balkans, and the promotion of Spain's role within the Council of Europe.

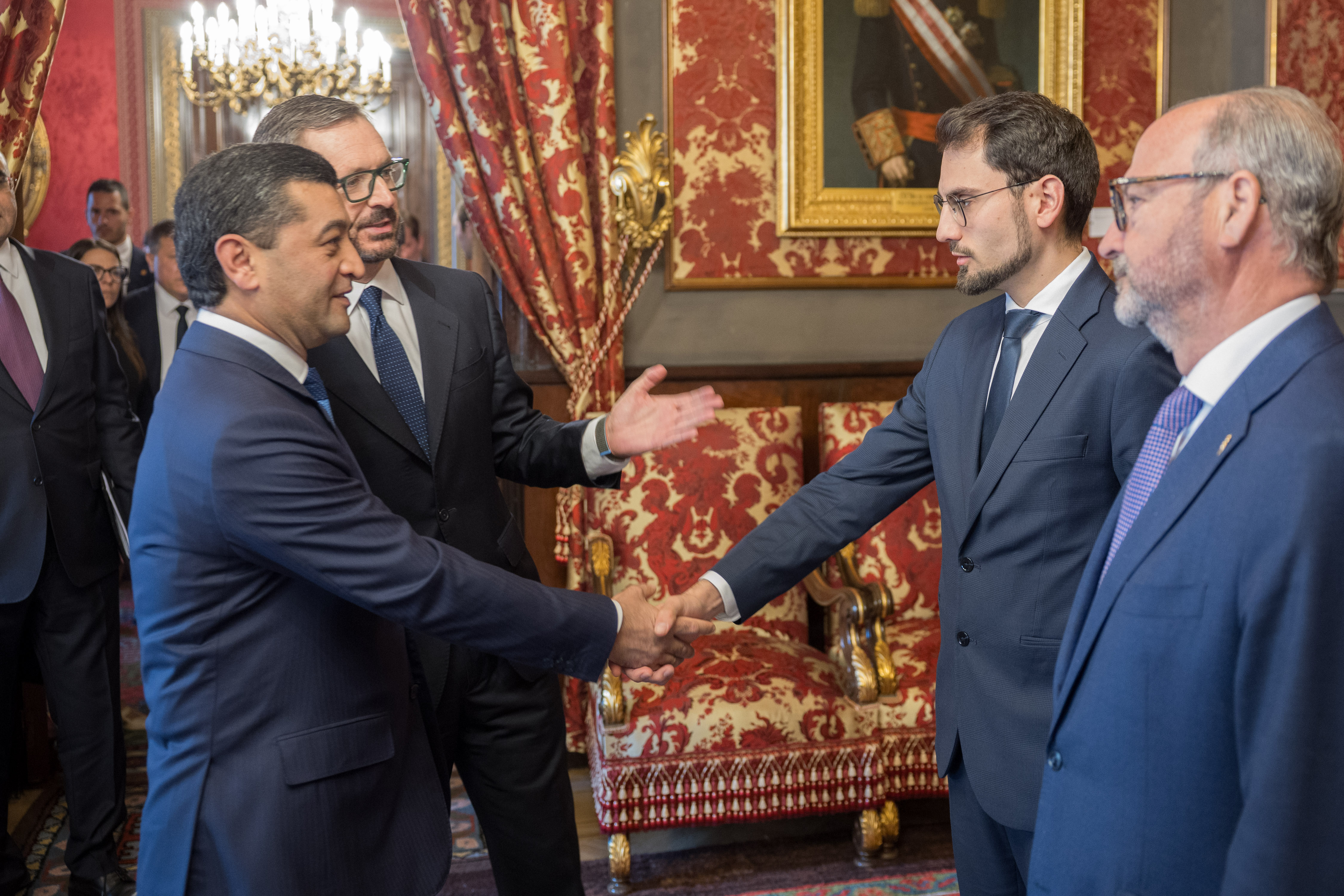
Visit by the Minister of Foreign Affairs of Uzbekistan

Committee on Ecological Transition (Member): Pomés has been a member of this committee since February 2024, participating in the scrutiny of Spain's climate policy, energy transition and environmental legislation, consistent with his commitment to multilateral governance and European Green Deal objectives.

General Committee on Local Entities (Member): His dual mandate as both senator and mayor of Cervera places him in a privileged position within this committee, which scrutinises legislation affecting Spain's municipalities, provincial councils and other local bodies. Pomés channels the interests of comarca capitals in the Ponent region into the national legislative process.

=== International parliamentary delegations ===
Brussels, March 2024 — Interparliamentary Conference on Circular Economy

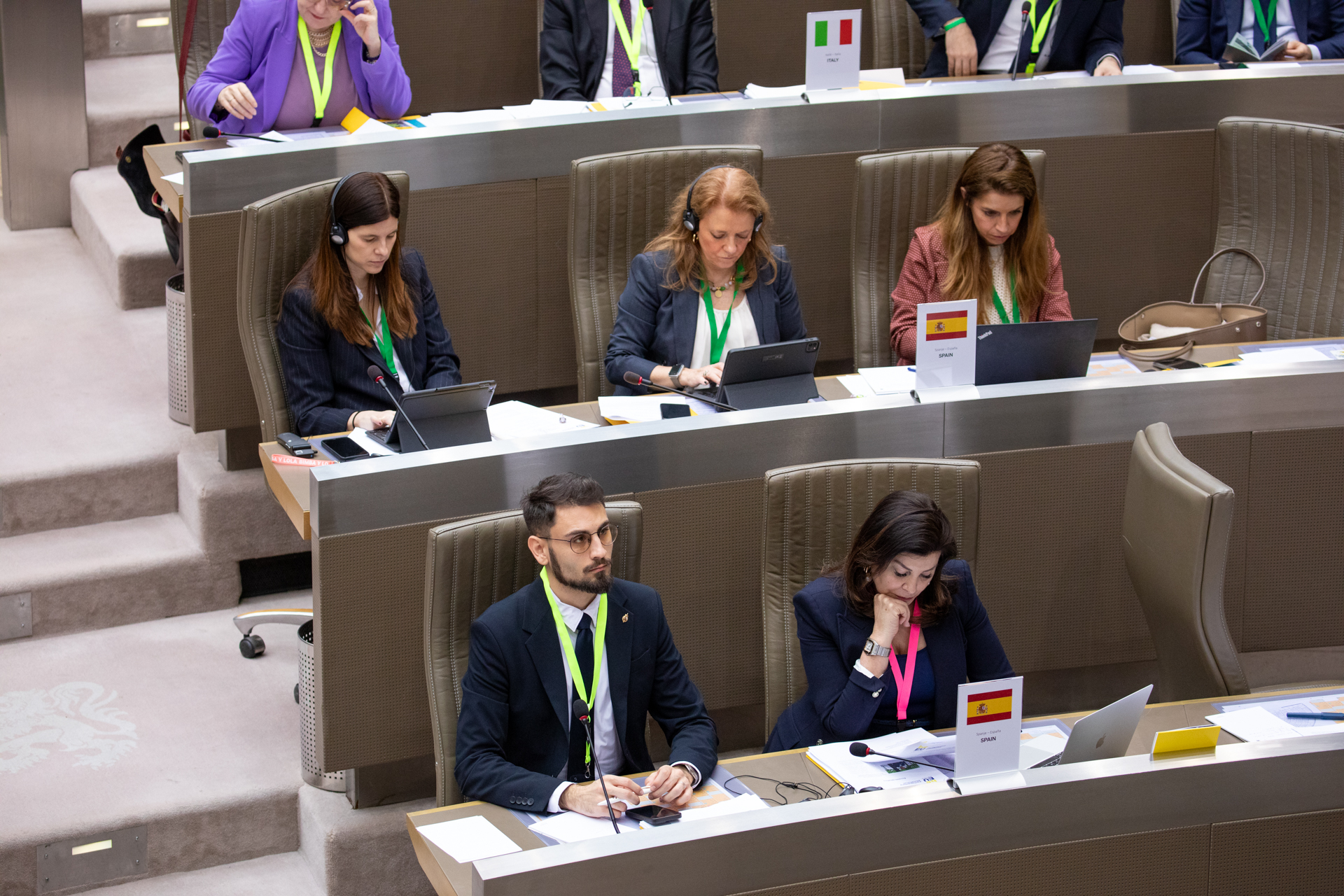
Brussels, March 2024 — Interparliamentary Conference on Circular Economy

On 17 and 18 March 2024, Pomés took part in an interparliamentary meeting in Brussels linked to the parliamentary dimension of the Belgian Presidency of the Council of the European Union. The event, held at the Flemish Parliament, was the Interparliamentary Conference on Circular Economy, which brought together participants from national parliaments to discuss the role of the European Union in promoting circular economy policies and cooperation among member states.

The programme included institutional addresses by representatives of the Flemish Parliament and the Belgian Presidency, presentations on circular economy best practices, and a debate on the future of circular economy in the European Union. Topics included EU targets for circularity, the creation of circular hubs, training and education for circular skills, reuse of raw materials, and the possible adoption of a European framework to strengthen circular economic governance.

Brussels, February 2025 — European Parliamentary Week and Interparliamentary Conference on Economic Governance

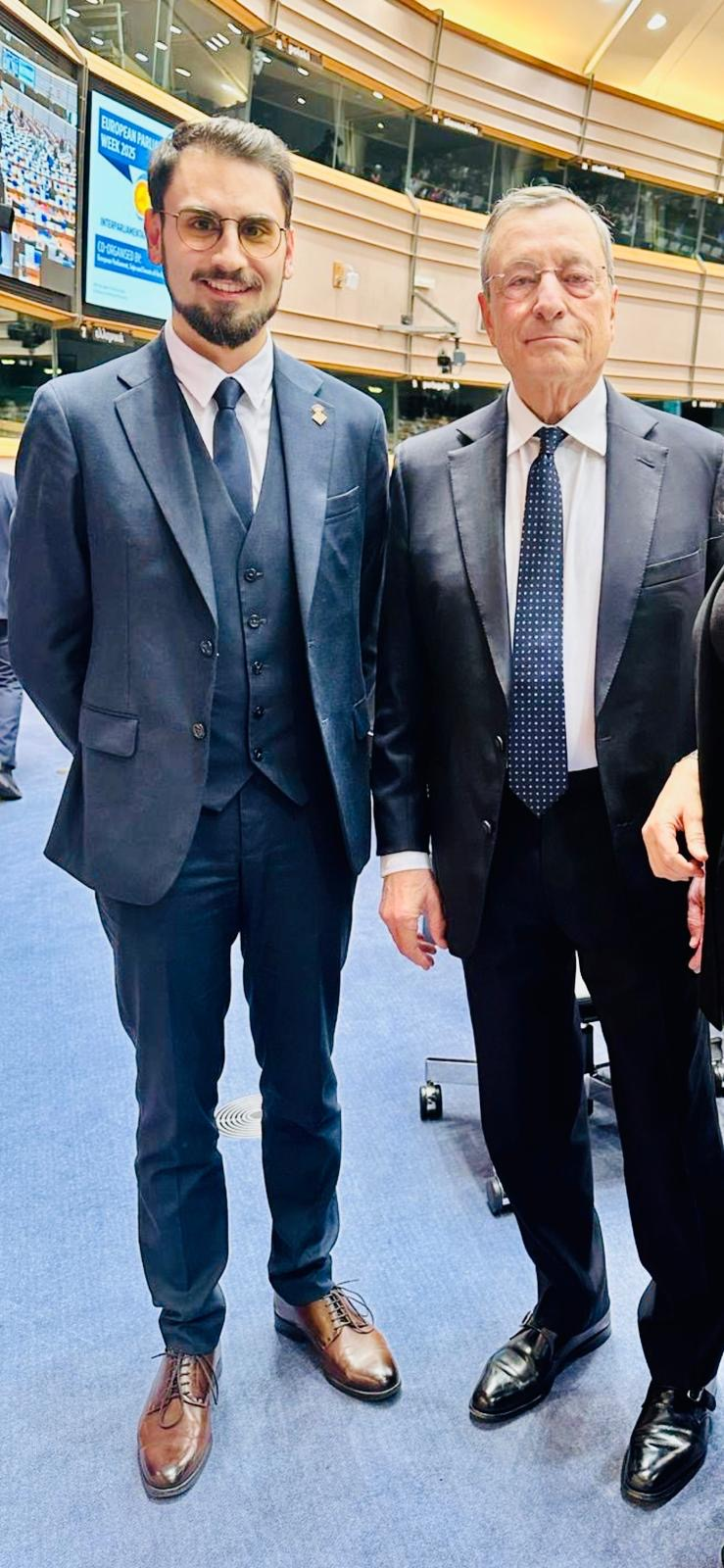
Jan with Mario Draghi at the European Parliament during the European Parliamentary Week & Interparliamentary Conference on Economic Governance

On 17 and 18 February 2025, Pomés took part in the European Parliamentary Week in Brussels, held at the European Parliament. The event included the Inter-parliamentary Conference on Stability, Economic Coordination and Governance in the European Union and the Conference on the European Semester, bringing together members of national parliaments, candidate and observer countries, and Members of the European Parliament to discuss economic, budgetary and social issues.

The 2025 programme focused on EU competitiveness, economic governance, banking union, capital markets, employment policy, labour market change, public budgets and the revised European economic governance framework. The plenary sessions also addressed the single market, innovation policy, better regulation and quality jobs, with contributions from senior EU institutional representatives and invited speakers including Mario Draghi.

Astana, Kazakhstan, 9–10 June 2025 — Delegation by invitation of the President of the Senate of Kazakhstan

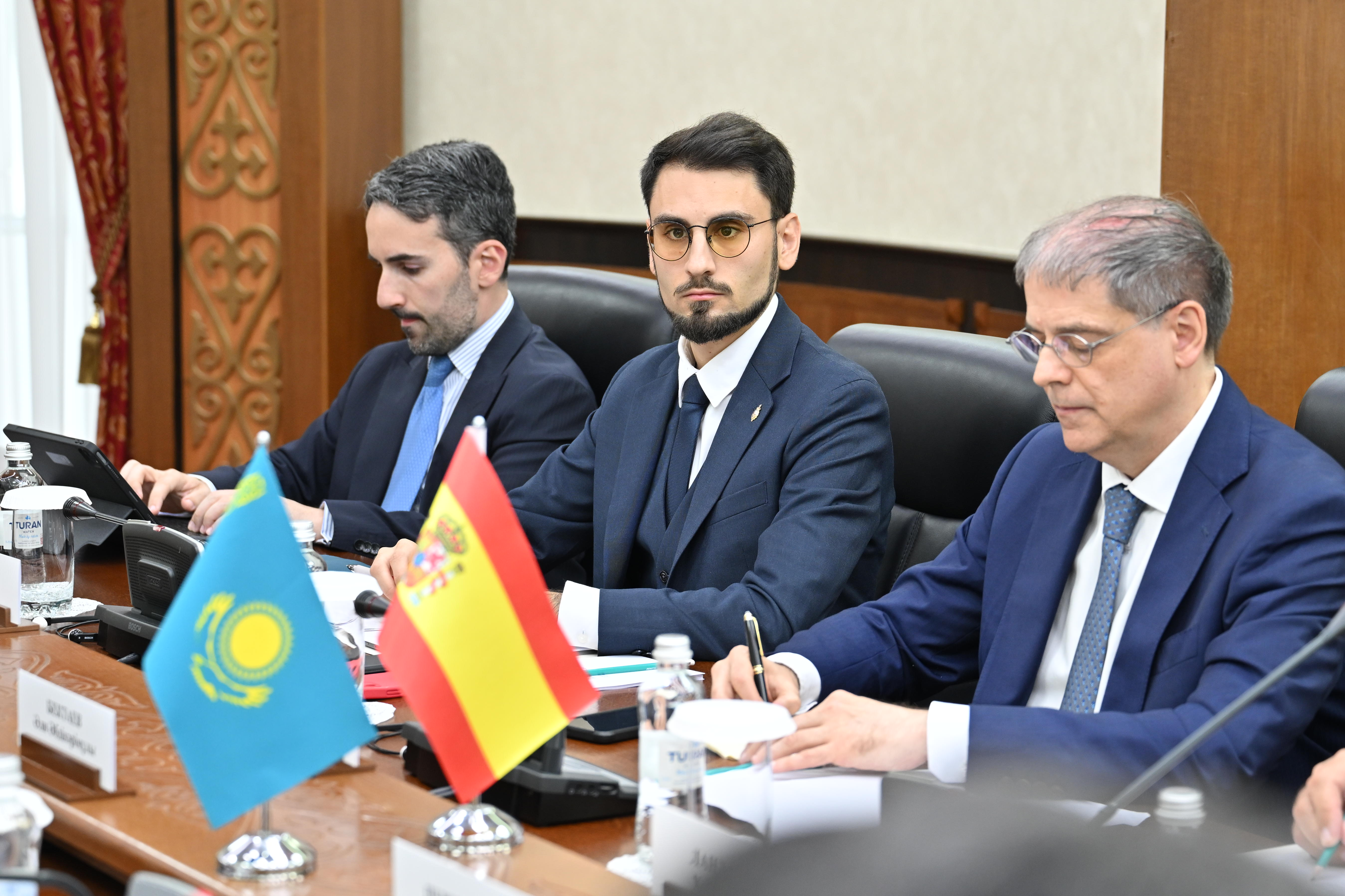
Astana, Kazakhstan, 9–10 June 2025 — Official delegation to Kazakhstan at the invitation of the President of the Senate of Kazakhstan

Pomés travelled to Astana, Kazakhstan, as part of an official Senate delegation invited by the President of the Senate of the Parliament of Kazakhstan. The delegation comprised the President of the Foreign Affairs Committee, José Ignacio Landaluce Calleja, the President of the Agriculture, Livestock and Food Committee, Jorge Domingo Martínez Antolín, and Pomés as Second Secretary of the Foreign Affairs Committee. The delegation was received in Astana by the Spanish Ambassador to Kazakhstan, Luis Francisco Martínez Montes, who provided a briefing on the geopolitical situation in Kazakhstan and on the state of bilateral relations and Spanish business activity in the country.

During the two-day programme, the delegation held meetings with the Vice-president of the Senate of Kazakhstan, Olga Perepechina; the Vice-Minister for Foreign Affairs, Roman Vassilenko; and the Vice-Minister for Agriculture, Ermek Kenzhekhanuly. The delegation also visited the Astana Hub, the country's main technology and startup accelerator. Pomés intervened directly at the meeting with the Vice-Minister for Foreign Affairs, highlighting the importance of bilateral relations between Spain and Kazakhstan and acknowledging Kazakhstan's efforts to ensure the effectiveness of sanctions imposed on Russia over the war in Ukraine. At the meeting with the Vice-Minister for Agriculture, he raised the interests of Spanish agri-food companies and underscored the role of both countries as respective gateways between Europe and Central Asia. He also questioned the Astana Hub director on government funding mechanisms and the potential for collaboration with Spanish aerospace companies.

Skopje, North Macedonia, 23–25 November 2025 — Observation of EU Integration Process

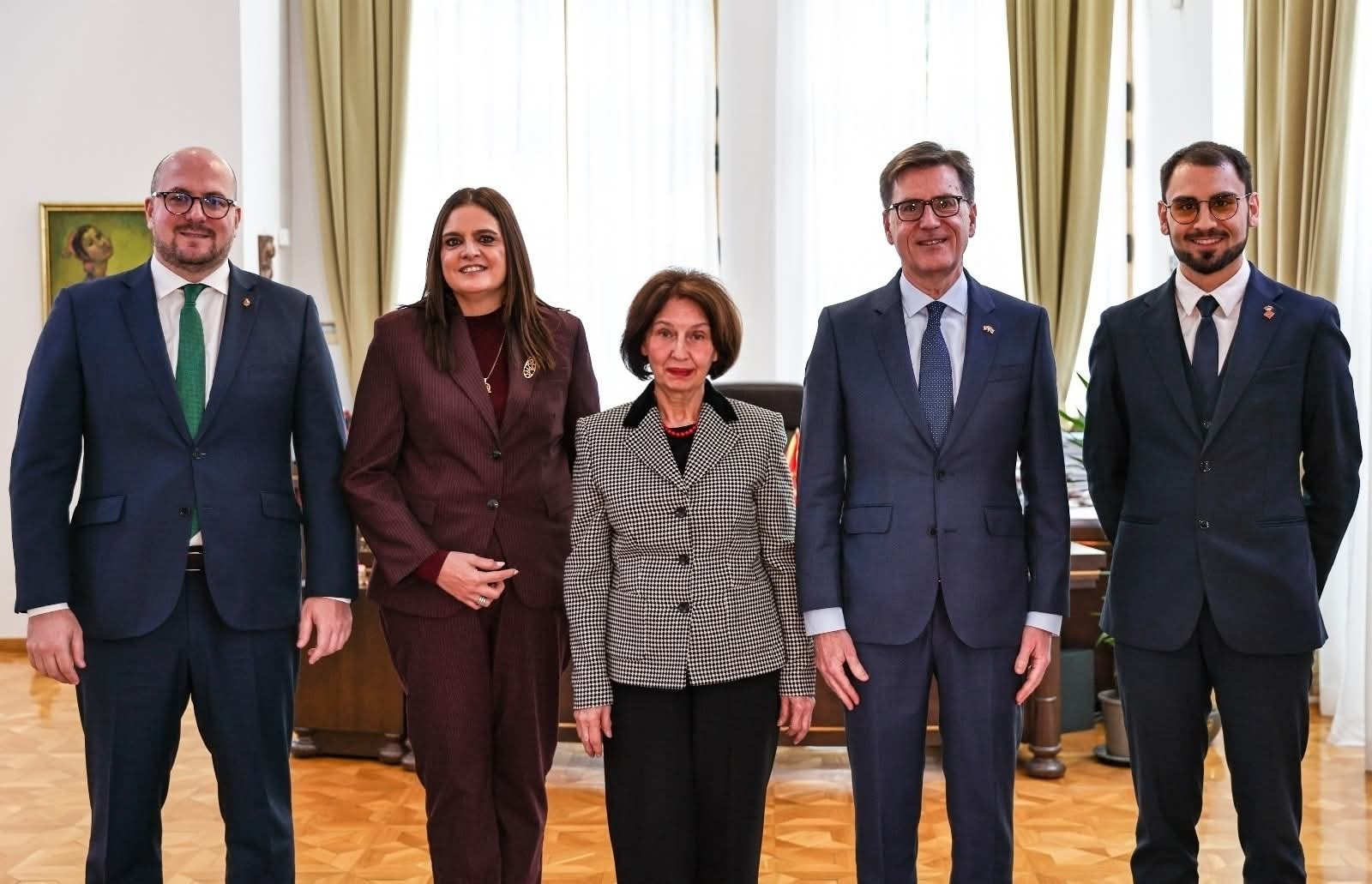
Jan with the Spanish delegation meeting with the President of North Macedonia

In November 2025, Pomés participated as a member of a Spanish Senate delegation to Skopje, the capital of North Macedonia, in the framework of the observation of North Macedonia's process of integration into the European Union. North Macedonia has been an EU candidate country since 2005 and officially opened accession negotiations with the EU in July 2022. The delegation's visit took place in the context of the parliamentary accompaniment of the country's accession process and included a personal meeting with the President of North Macedonia, Gordana Siljanovska-Davkova, who became the first woman to hold the presidency of the country following her election in May 2024. Siljanovska-Davkova, a constitutional law professor and candidate of the nationalist-conservative party VMRO-DPMNE, has maintained the country's Euro-Atlantic orientation despite her nationalist platform, keeping EU accession as an objective of her government.

== Written and academic works ==
Pomés's bibliographic output falls almost entirely within the collective publications of the Spanish Federal Council of the European Movement (CFEME) and its publishing network, principally with Marcial Pons and Los Libros de la Catarata, under the academic direction of Professor Francisco Aldecoa Luzárraga.

== Ideology and political principles ==
=== Spanish federalism ===
Pomés situates himself within the tradition of democratic federalism within Catalan and Spanish socialism. From within the PSC, his vision is one of a reform of the Spanish state towards a federal structure, with a clear and symmetrical distribution of competences, in which the nations and regions composing Spain enjoy a genuine, constitutionally enshrined self-government. He contends that the State of the Autonomies, as configured since the Constitution of 1978, has exhibited structural limitations that must be overcome through a federal reformulation guaranteeing both territorial cohesion and respect for national diversity.

=== The Ventotene Manifesto as ideological foundation ===
His European federalism draws directly from the Ventotene Manifesto (Towards a Free and United Europe, 1941), the founding text of European federalism drafted by the anti-fascists Altiero Spinelli, Ernesto Rossi and Eugenio Colorni whilst held as prisoners of Mussolini's regime on the island of Ventotene. The Manifesto, first published in 1944 and regarded as the cornerstone of modern Europeanist thought, advocates the definitive abolition of Europe's division into sovereign nation-states and the creation of a European federation with a single army, monetary union and the elimination of customs barriers between member states. Pomés regards this document as the philosophical and political roadmap for the construction of a genuinely federal Europe, and it constitutes the central ideological reference of his leadership within the European Movement. The figure of Altiero Spinelli — patron saint of the European federalist tradition that Pomés embodies — stands as the foremost intellectual reference of his militant Europeanism.

=== European federalist principles ===
His European federalism finds expression in the following principles:

- Reform of the EU Treaties to advance towards a genuinely federal institutional architecture, with a European Parliament vested with full legislative powers and a European government answerable to its citizens.
- Defence of territorial and linguistic diversity as an asset of the European federation rather than an obstacle to integration.
- Greater agency for local and regional bodies in European decision-making, through an active application of the subsidiarity principle.
- Europeanism as a democratic instrument for cohesion, peace and prosperity: the European Union and the Council of Europe are regarded as the institutional frameworks that enabled Spain's democratic transition and its integration into the community of European democracies.
- The nexus between local and European identity: Cervera as an illustration of how a city of historic standing may simultaneously serve as a "gateway" to Europe.
