= Congress of Deputies =

Lower house of the Cortes Generales

Coordinates: 40°24′59″N 3°41′48″W

Congress of Deputies Congreso de los Diputados Co-official languages Basque: Diputatuen Kongresua Catalan: Congrés dels Diputats Galician: Congreso dos Deputados Aranese: Congrès des Deputats
- 15th Congress of Deputies

Type
- Type: Lower house of the Cortes Generales of the Kingdom of Spain

History
- Founded: 1810

Leadership
- President: Francina Armengol, PSOE since 17 August 2023
- First Vice President: Alfonso Rodríguez Gómez de Celis, PSOE since 3 December 2019
- Second Vice President: José Antonio Bermúdez de Castro, PP since 17 August 2023
- Third Vice President: Esther Gil de Reboleño Lastortres, SMR since 17 August 2023
- Fourth Vice President: Marta González Vázquez, PP since 17 August 2023

Structure
- Seats: 350
- Political groups: Government (147): PSOE (121); Sumar (26) (Note: MS (11); Comuns (6); IU (5); MM (2); Compromís (1); Més (1)); Supported by (24): ERC (7); EH Bildu (6); EAJ/PNV (5); Mixed Group (6) (Note: Podemos (4); BNG (1); Compromís (1)); Opposition (179): PP (137); Vox (32); Junts (7); Mixed Group (3) (Note: UPN (1); CCa (1); Javier Ortega Smith (1))

Elections
- Voting system: Closed list proportional representation, D'Hondt method
- Last election: 23 July 2023
- Next election: 29 November 2026

Meeting place
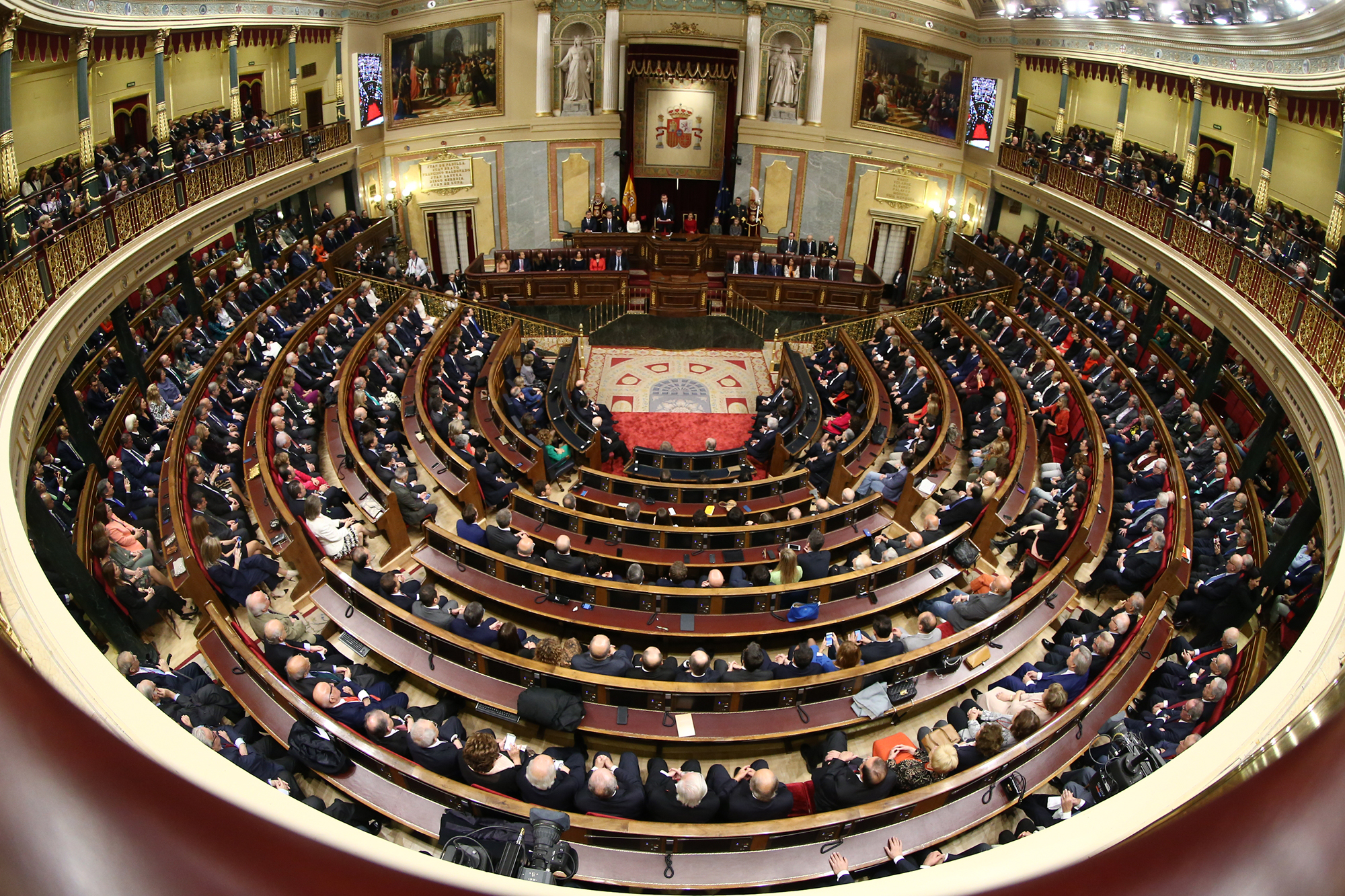
- Palacio de las Cortes; Madrid, Community of Madrid; Kingdom of Spain

Website
- congreso.es

Rules
- Standing Orders of the Congress of Deputies (English)

The Congress of Deputies (Spanish: Congreso de los Diputados) is the lower house of the Cortes Generales, Spain's legislative branch, the upper house being the Senate. The Congress meets in the Palace of the Parliament (Palacio de las Cortes) in Madrid.

Congress has 350 members elected from fifty-two constituencies (the fifty provinces and two autonomous cities) using closed list D'Hondt proportional representation. Deputies serve four-year terms. The presiding officer and speaker is the President of the Congress of Deputies, who is elected by the members at the first sitting of Congress after an election.

The two principal bodies in Congress are parliamentary groups and parliamentary committees (Spanish: comisiones). All MPs are required to be members of a parliamentary group, the institutionalised form of political parties. Groups act with one voice represented by their spokesperson. In other words, the Spanish Parliament is a parliament of groups, not individual MPs who are constrained to act only as part of the group. MPs can only act autonomously when submitting oral or written questions.

As a result of the 2019 general election, there were 168 female deputies or 48% of all members, making Spain the European country with the highest percentage of women in parliament, surpassing Sweden and Finland; however, the share decreased to a 44.3% after the elections in 2023.

== Constitutional position ==
=== House makeup ===
==== Composition ====
Section 68.1 of the Spanish Constitution establishes that the Congress of Deputies must be composed of at least 300, and no more than 400 deputies. At present, the house has 350 deputies which is determined by the 1985 Electoral Act.

==== Electoral system ====
Deputies per constituency set for the general election of 2023

The Spanish Constitution establishes that the deputies are chosen by universal, free, equal, direct, and secret suffrage. The election is held every four years or earlier in case of snap election. The members of the Congress are elected by proportional representation with closed lists in each constituency.

There are 52 constituencies for the Congress of Deputies corresponding to the 50 provinces of Spain and two autonomous cities (Ceuta and Melilla). According to Spanish electoral law, the number of seats in each constituency can change in each election and it is specified when writs of election are issued. Each province is guaranteed a minimum allocation of two seats, and one seat each for Ceuta and Melilla for a total of 102 seats. The remaining 248 seats are allocated proportionally according to the population using the Hare quota.

After the General Election, seats are assigned to the electoral lists in each constituency separately, using the D'Hondt method; parties receive seats in approximate proportion to the number of votes each received in the constituency. A strictly proportional system would result in fractional seats; the D'Hondt method resolves this by favoring parties receiving larger votes.

For provinces that elect at least 24 deputies, the 1985 Electoral Act establishes a 3% minimum valid votes by constituency requirement (blank votes count towards the total votes, but invalid ballots do not count) for a party to participate in the seat distribution for a constituency. At present, this condition applies only to Madrid and Barcelona.

In March 2011, the Electoral Act was modified to require parties that are not represented either in Congress or in the Senate to collect signatures to support their candidacy to be able to run in the election. One-tenth of a percent of those registered to vote in a constituency are required to be on the ballot and each citizen can sign only once for a party candidacy. The Electoral Board establishes the regulations for the collection of signatures.

==== Mandate ====
The deputies' term of office finishes four years after their election or when the Cortes are dissolved, which can take place jointly or separately with the dissolution of the Senate. Only the Monarch can dissolve Parliament on the request of the President of the Government after the deliberation of the Council of Ministers. The dissolution of the Cortes also takes place if there is a failed legislature or two months after a failed investiture session, in this case, the Monarch dissolves the house with the countersign of the President of the Congress of Deputies. During their mandate, the deputies have some guarantees and privileges to carry their responsibilities out according to Section 97 of the Spanish Constitution.

=== Bodies of the Congress ===
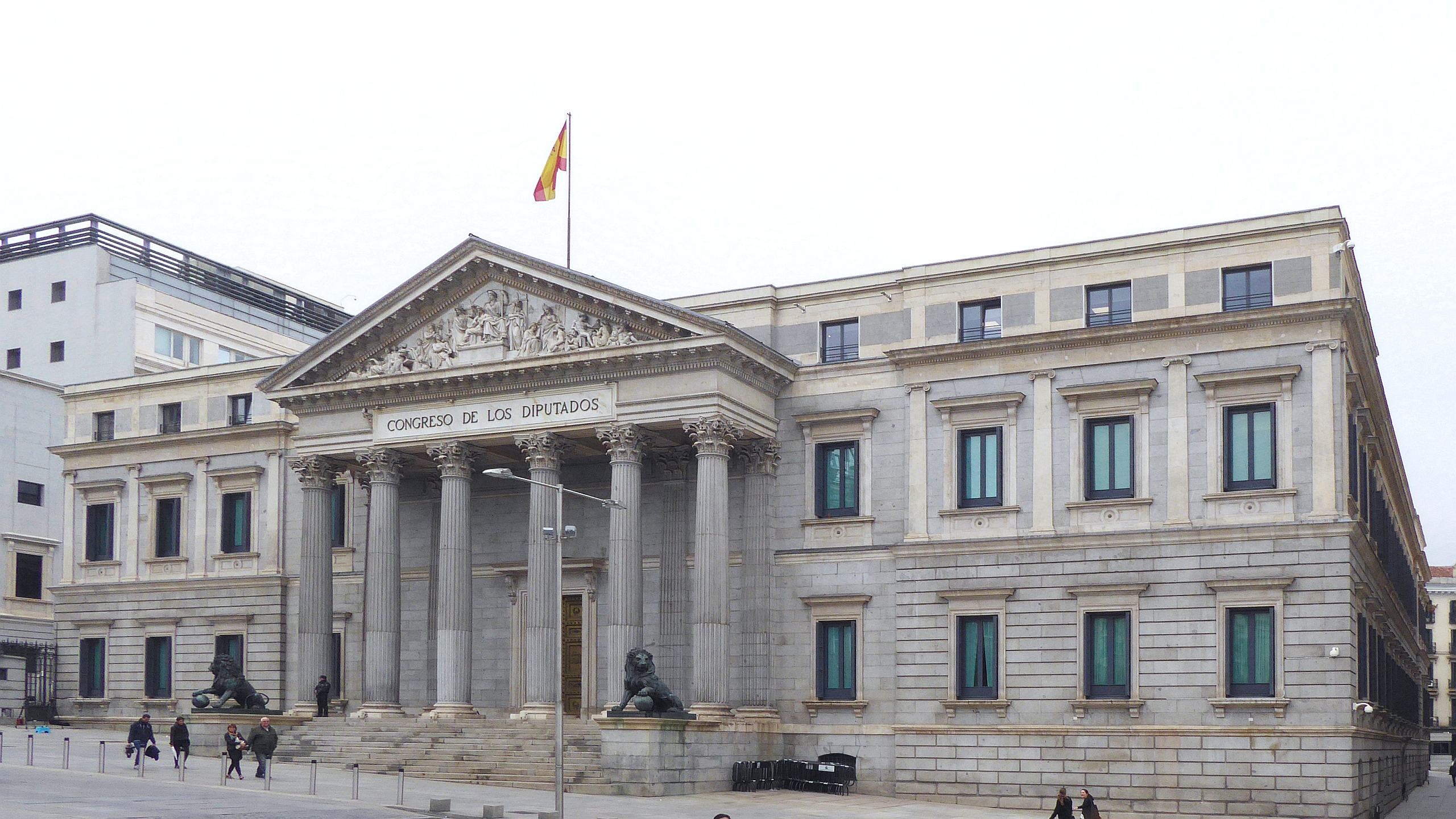
Congreso de los Diputados (built 1850): Palacio de las Cortes. Seat of the Spanish Parliament in Madrid (2016)

Exercising the autonomy recognised by the Constitution to the Congress of Deputies, the house is regulated by some internal rules established by itself in 1982 and it configures different government bodies to carry the pertinent competencies out.

==== Governing bodies ====
The governing bodies of the Congress of Deputies are the bodies which under their authority the House is manage. Those bodies are the President, the Bureau and the Board of Spokespersons.

The President of the Congress of Deputies is the highest authority and it represents the House and it is, de facto, the whole parliament leader. As head of the Congress, it also chairs the Bureau, the Board of Spokespersons and the Permanent Deputation, and is the maximum responsible authority of the Congress's Police.

The Bureau of the Congress of Deputies is the collective body that represents the House and manages the day-to-day of the Chamber, preparing the budget and making all the necessary decisions to allow the proper functioning of the functions of the Congress.

The Board of Spokespersons of the Congress of Deputies is the collective body formed by representatives of the parliamentary groups and normally, government representatives, that establishes the agenda of the House.

==== Working bodies ====
The working bodies of the Congress of Deputies are the Plenary, the Committees, the Permanent Deputation and the Parliamentary Groups.

The Plenary is the central body of the Congress of Deputies which allows the house to exercise their choices. It is the sitting of all the members of the Parliament when half plus one of its members are attending the house. This body represents the unity of the house and it works through the plenary sessions which can be ordinary or extraordinary.

The ordinary sessions take place during the two meeting terms: September to December and February to June. The extraordinary sessions are convened at the request of the Prime Minister of Spain, the Permanent Council or the absolute majority of the house. In this kind of session a particular agenda is presented, and the session ends when all items have been discussed.

The Committees are the basic working bodies of the Congress designed to facilitate the work of the house. The committees have the same powers as the Plenary: to legislate by delegation of the plenary or at the request of the Bureau, and to check the Government by requesting information of the Administration or by requesting the appearance of any member of the Government or Administration.

There are two types of committees: standing and non-standing. The standing committees are defined by the Congress's standing orders and non-standing committees, created by the Plenary. The standing committees examine bills and make amendments. The Plenary of the Congress can confer upon them full legislative power in relation to a matter, so they can approve or reject any bill. There are 23 permanent (standing) legislative committees and 8 permanent (standing) non-legislative committees which have responsibilities for House administration. The Plenary can create additional non-legislative committees at the beginning of each legislature. The non-standing committees are created with a specific purpose and their themes and duration are determined by the Plenary.

The members of the committees are chosen by the Parliamentary Groups with the number of members proportional to the number of seats in the House, which means they are not effective checks on the Government when the party in office has a parliamentary majority. Once the committees are created they must elect in their first meeting the bureau of the committee, composed of a chair, two deputy chairs and two secretaries. In practice, the largest party always enjoys a clear over-representation in the distribution of chairpersons.

Subcommittees can also be created by the Plenary at the request of the committees. There are two types of subcommittees, the ordinary subcommittees, the purpose of which is to discuss and report on a specific issue, and the reporting subcommittees, the purpose of which is to write a draft bill to be discussed in the committee. The members of the subcommittees are designated by the committee.

The Permanent Deputation is a body created in order to have a permanent constituted legislative power. It is responsible for safeguarding the powers of the house between the legislative sessions (January, July and August) or when their term has finished because of termination or dissolution. In these three cases, the Permanent Deputation is a temporary extension of the house. The Permanent Deputation is presided by the President of the Congress. It is composed of a proportional number of deputies depending on the numerical importance of the different Parliamentary Groups.

All members of the house are assigned to one of the Parliamentary Groups reflecting their party affiliation or ideology. The formation of the parliamentary groups takes place at the beginning of each legislature. The deputies (members) who cannot satisfy the rules for forming a group are placed together in their own group (called the Mixed Group) so that they can still participate in the functions of Parliament.

== Composition of the XV legislature ==
The XV legislature of Spain started on 17 August 2023 when the Cortes Generales were constituted, once the 2023 general election was held.

=== Bureau of the Congress of Deputies ===
Bureau of the Congress of Deputies
Position	Holder	Party
President	Francina Armengol Socias	PSOE
First Vice President	Alfonso Rodríguez Gómez de Celis	PSOE
Second Vice President	José Antonio Bermúdez de Castro	PP
Third Vice President	Esther Gil de Reboleño Lastortres	SMR
Fourth Vice President	Marta González Vázquez	PP
First Secretary	Gerardo Pisarello Prados	SMR
Second Secretary	Isaura Leal Fernández	PSOE
Third Secretary	Guillermo Mariscal Anaya	PP
Fourth Secretary	María del Carmen Navarro Lacoba	PP

=== Current Committees (XV legislature, 2023–present) ===
==== Permanent Legislative Committees ====
Committee	Chair(s)		Term
Constitutional	José Zaragoza Alonso	PSOE	2023–present
Foreign Affairs	Juan Carlos Ruiz Boix	PSOE	2023–present
Justice	Francisco Lucas Ayala	PSOE	2023–present
Defence	Alberto Fabra Part	PP	2023–present
Finance and Civil Service	Alejandro Soler Mur	PSOE	2023–present
Budgets	Carlos Martín Urriza	SMR	2023–present
Interior	José Luis Ábalos Meco	PSOE	2023–present
Transport and Sustainable Mobility	José Ramón Gómez Besteiro	PSOE	2023–present
Education, Vocational Training and Sports	Mercedes González Fernández	PSOE	2023–present
Labour, Social Economy, Inclusion, Social Security and Migration	Aina Vidal Sáez	SMR (CatComú)	2023–present
Industry and Tourism	Inés Granollers i Cunillera	ERC	2023–present
Social Rights and Consumer Affairs	Luis Carlos Sahuquillo García	PSOE	2023–present
Agriculture, Fisheries and Food	Joseba Andoni Agirretxea Urresti	EAJ–PNV	2023–present
Territorial Policy	Rafaela Crespín Rubio	PSOE	2023–present
Ecological Transition and the Demographic Challenge	Cristina Narbona Ruiz	PSOE	2023–present
Housing and Urban Agenda	Isabel María Borrego Cortés	PP	2023–present
Culture	Gerardo Pisarello Prados	SMR (CatComú)	2023–present
Economy, Trade and Digital Transformation	Pedro Puy Fraga	PP	2023–present
Health	Agustín Santos Maraver	SMR	2023–present
Science, Innovation and Universities	María Sandra Moneo Díez	PP	2023–present
International Cooperation for Development	Susana Ros Martínez	PSOE	2023–present
Equality	Carmen Calvo Poyato	PSOE	2023–present
Youth and Children	Jordi Salvador i Duch	ERC	2023–present

==== Permanent non-Legislative Committees ====
Committee	Chair(s)		Term
Rules	Francina Armengol Socias	PSOE	2023–present
Deputies' Statute	Manuel Cobo Vega	PP	2023–present
Petitions	Carlos Aragonés Mendiguchía	PP	2023–present
Monitoring and Evaluation of the Agreements of the Toledo Pact	María Mercè Perea i Conillas	PSOE	2023–present
Monitoring and Evaluation of the Agreements of the State Pact against Gender Violence	Adriana Lastra Fernández	PSOE	2023–present
Comprehensive Disability Policies	María Mercedes Fernández González	PP	2023–present
Democratic Quality, Fight Against Corruption and Institutional and Legal Reforms	Antidio Fagúndez Campo	PSOE	2023–present
Road Safety	Marta Madrenas i Mir	Junts	2023–present

== Historical composition ==
=== Kingdom of Spain (since 1975) ===
UCD / PSOE / PCE / PA / PSP-US / PDC / UCiDCC / EAJ/PNV / EC-FED / EE / Others / CAIC / CIC / CD / CiU / UN / PSA-PA / HB / ERC / UPC / PAR / UPN / AP / CDS / FN / IU / AIC / UV / PP / EA / CCa / BNG / ICV / CHA / NaBai / UPyD / Amaiur / Compromís / CC-PNC / FAC / GBai / Podemos / C's / DiL / EH Bildu / EH Bildu / UP / CDC / Vox / JxCat / PRC / Na+ / Más País / CUP / ¡TE! / Sumar / Junts
1977	20 / 1 / 1 / 6 / 118 / 1 / 11 / 8 / 2 / 165 / 16
1979	3 / 1 / 23 / 1 / 1 / 5 / 121 / 8 / 1 / 8 / 7 / 168 / 9 / 1 / 1
1982	2 / 4 / 1 / 1 / 202 / 2 / 8 / 12 / 11 / 107
1986	5 / 7 / 2 / 184 / 19 / 6 / 19 / 1 / 1 / 1 / 105
1989	4 / 17 / 2 / 2 / 175 / 2 / 14 / 5 / 18 / 1 / 1 / 2 / 107
1993	2 / 18 / 1 / 159 / 1 / 5 / 17 / 1 / 4 / 1 / 141
1996	2 / 2 / 21 / 1 / 141 / 1 / 5 / 16 / 4 / 1 / 156
2000	3 / 8 / 1 / 1 / 1 / 1 / 125 / 1 / 7 / 15 / 4 / 183
2004	2 / 5 / 8 / 1 / 164 / 1 / 7 / 10 / 3 / 148
2008	2 / 2 / 3 / 169 / 1 / 1 / 6 / 10 / 2 / 154
2011	7 / 2 / 11 / 3 / 1 / 110 / 1 / 5 / 5 / 16 / 2 / 186 / 1
2015	2 / 2 / 69 / 9 / 90 / 6 / 8 / 40 / 1 / 123
2016	2 / 71 / 9 / 85 / 5 / 8 / 32 / 1 / 137
Apr. 2019	4 / 42 / 15 / 1 / 123 / 6 / 7 / 1 / 57 / 2 / 2 / 66 / 24
Nov. 2019	2 / 5 / 35 / 13 / 3 / 120 / 6 / 7 / 1 / 1 / 10 / 2 / 2 / 89 / 52
Nov. 2023	6 / 1 / 31 / 7 / 121 / 5 / 7 / 1 / 1 / 137 / 33

== Presidency of the Congress of Deputies ==
Legislature	President	Party	Start	End
Constituent	Fernando Álvarez de Miranda	UCD	13 July 1977	22 March 1979
I legislature	Landelino Lavilla Alsina	UCD	23 March 1979	17 November de 1982
II legislature	Gregorio Peces-Barba	PSOE	18 November 1982	14 July 1986
III legislature	Félix Pons Irazazábal	PSOE	15 July 1986	26 March 1996
IV legislature	Félix Pons Irazazábal	PSOE	15 July 1986	26 March 1996
V legislature	Félix Pons Irazazábal	PSOE	15 July 1986	26 March 1996
VI legislature	Federico Trillo-Figueroa	PP	27 March 1996	4 April 2000
VII legislature	Luisa Fernanda Rudi Úbeda	PP	5 April 2000	1 April 2004
VIII legislature	Manuel Marín González	PSOE	2 April 2004	31 March de 2008
IX legislature	José Bono Martínez	PSOE	1 April 2008	12 December 2011
X legislature	Jesús Posada Moreno	PP	13 December 2011	12 January 2016
XI legislature	Patxi López Álvarez	PSOE	13 January 2016	18 July 2016
XII legislature	Ana Pastor Julián	PP	19 July 2016	20 May 2019
XIII legislature	Meritxell Batet Lamaña	PSC	21 May 2019	16 August 2023
XIV legislature	Meritxell Batet Lamaña	PSC	21 May 2019	16 August 2023
XV legislature	Francina Armengol Socias	PSOE	17 August 2023	Incumbent

== Congress of Deputies building ==
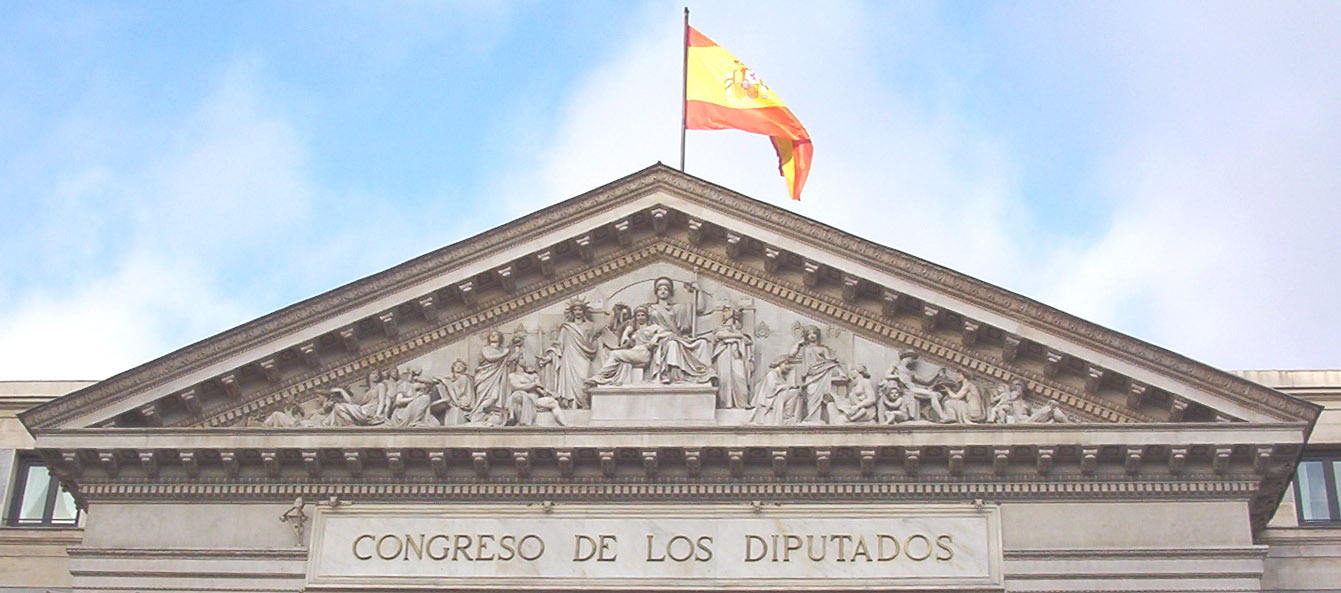
The allegorical front of the building

The building, Palacio de las Cortes, has a neoclassical style. It was designed by Narciso Pascual Colomer, and built between 1843 and 1850. It sits by the Carrera de San Jerónimo, in Madrid. The relief on the facade by sculptor Ponciano Ponzano centers on a sculpture of Spain embracing the constitutional state, represented by a woman with her arm around a young girl. Surrounding the pair are figures that represent in allegorical form Justice and Peace, Science, Agriculture, Fine Arts, Navigation, Industry, Commerce and so on. Ponzano also executed two bronze lions for the building's access stairway in a more realistic manner.

== See also ==
- Bureaus of the Cortes Generales
- Board of Spokespersons
- Canal Parlamento
- List of presidents of the Congress of Deputies of Spain
- Senate of Spain
- Political parties in Spain
- Spanish Parliamentarism

== Bibliography ==
- Fernandes, Jorge M; Riera, Pedro (2019). "Committee systems in Portugal and Spain". In Fernandes, Jorge M.; Leston-Bandeira, Cristina (eds.). The Iberian Legislatures in Comparative Perspective. Routledge. pp. 71–88. ISBN 9781351065214.
- Jalali, Carlos; Rodríguez Teruel, Juan (2019). "Parliamentary party groups in the Iberian democracies". In Fernandes, Jorge M.; Leston-Bandeira, Cristina (eds.). The Iberian Legislatures in Comparative Perspective. Routledge. pp. 49–70. ISBN 9781351065214.
- Sánchez de Dios, Manuel (1999). "Parliamentary Party Discipline in Spain" (PDF). In Bowler, Shaun; Farrell, David; Katz, Richard (eds.). Party Discipline and Parliamentary Government. Ohio State University Press. pp. 141–162. ISBN 0-8142-5000-9.
- Electoral System Act [Régimen Electoral General] (Organic Law 5/1985) (in Spanish). Agencia Estatal Boletín Oficial del Estado. 19 June 1985.
- "The Spanish Constitution" (PDF). Agencia Estatal Boletín Oficial del Estado [National Agency of the Official State Gazette]. 1978.
- "Standing Orders of the Congress of Deputies" (PDF). Congress of Deputies.
- OSCE/ODIHR (17 February 2012). "Spain, Early Parliamentary Elections, 20 November 2011: Final Report" (PDF). Warsaw: Organization for Security and Co-operation in Europe Office for Democratic Institutions and Human Rights.
