= Sant Miquel de Tudela =

Church in Cervera, Spain

Coordinates: 41.7278°N 1.3064°E

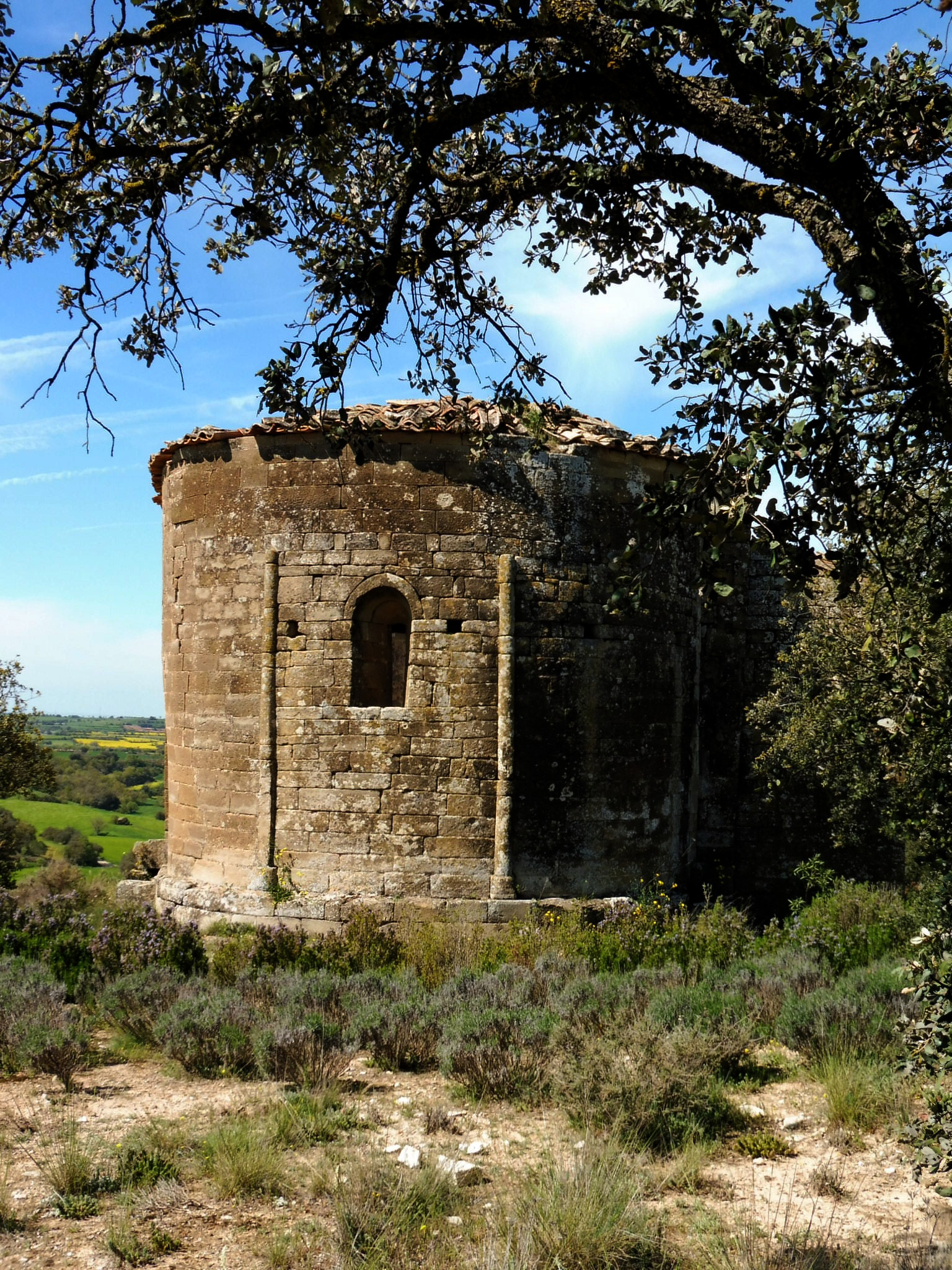
Sant Miquel de Tudela (Cervera): apse

Sant Pere de Tudela, commonly known as Sant Miquel de Tudela, is a church located near Cervera (Catalonia). It is listed on the Inventory of the Architectural Heritage of Catalonia.

The church is from the 12th century.
