= Inés Granollers =

Spanish businesswoman and politician

Inés Granollers MP

Member of the Congress of Deputies of Spain
- Incumbent
- Assumed office 16 May 2019
- Constituency: Lleida

Member of Bellpuig Municipal Council
- Incumbent
- Assumed office 2019

Personal details
- Born: Inés Granollers i Cunillera; 17 September 1970 (age 56) Bellpuig, Lérida, Spain
- Party: Republican Left of Catalonia
- Other political affiliations: Republican Left of Catalonia–Sovereigntists
- Occupation: Businesswoman

Inés Granollers i Cunillera (born 17 September 1970) is a Spanish businesswoman and politician who serves as Member of the Congress of Deputies of Spain.

== Early life ==
Granollers was born on 17 September 1970 in Bellpuig, Lérida.

== Career ==
Granollers owns a small business. At the 2015 local elections she was placed second on the Fem Bellpuig-Acord Municipal (FB-AM) electoral alliance's list of candidates in Bellpuig, but the alliance managed to win only one seat in the municipality, and, as a result, she failed to get elected. She contested the 2019 general election as a Republican Left of Catalonia–Sovereigntists electoral alliance candidate in the Province of Lleida and was elected to the Congress of Deputies. She contested the 2019 local elections as an Acord Municipal Republicà-Acord Municipal (AMR-AM) electoral alliance candidate in Bellpuig and was elected.

== Electoral history ==
Electoral history of Inés Granollers
Election	Constituency	Party	Alliance	No.	Result
2015 local	Bellpuig		Fem Bellpuig-Acord Municipal	2	Not elected
2019 general	Province of Lleida	Republican Left of Catalonia	Republican Left of Catalonia–Sovereigntists	2	Elected
2019 local	Bellpuig		Acord Municipal Republicà-Acord Municipal	2	Elected
