= Pilar Socorro =

Spanish journalist

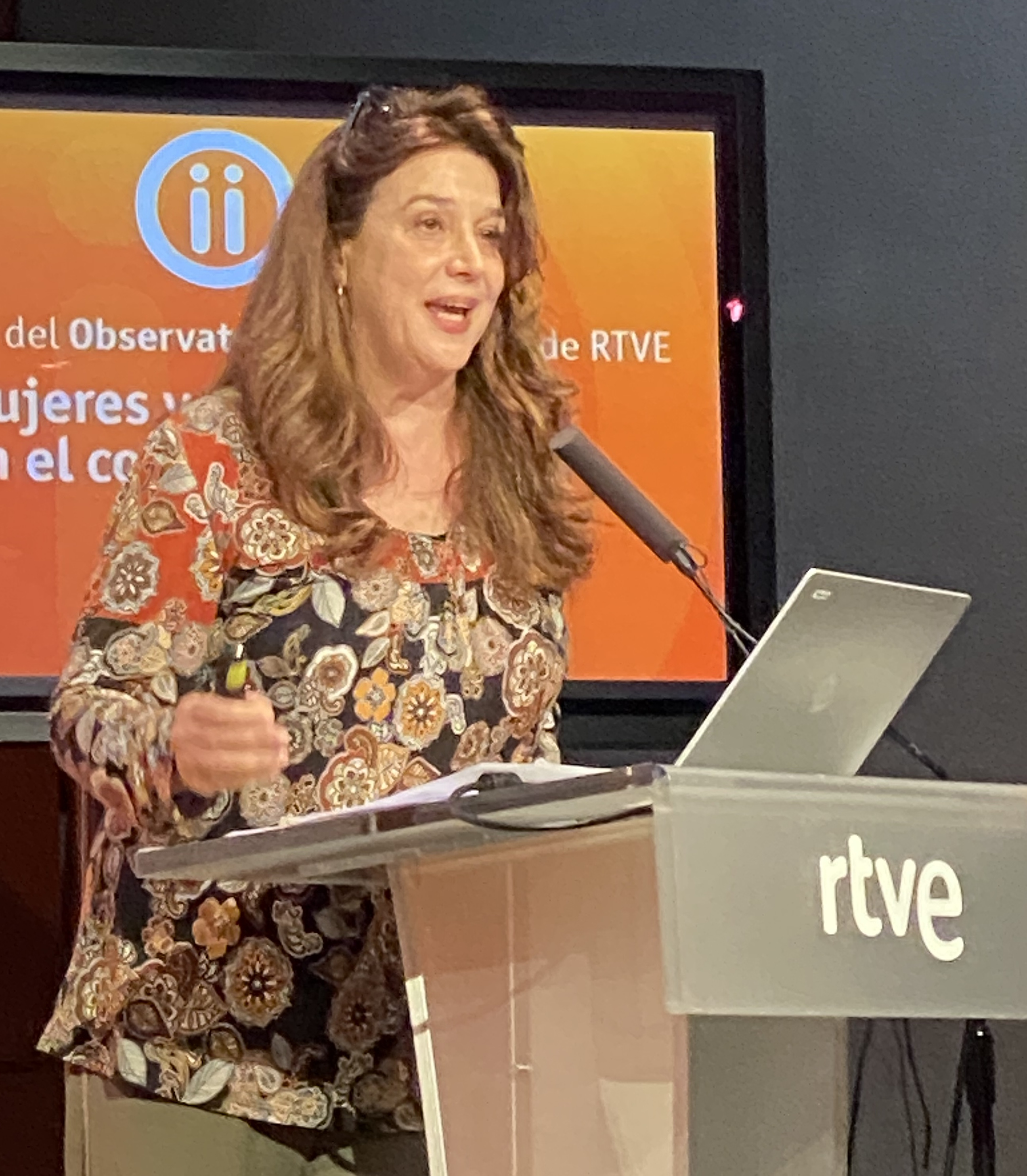
- Born: 14 May 1961 (age 65); Valencia, Carabobo, Venezuela
- Citizenship: Venezuelan; Spanish
- Occupation: Journalist

Pilar Socorro (born 14 May 1961) is a Venezuelan-born Spanish journalist known for her work on radio and television. She has spent most of her career on Radiotelevisión Española (RTVE), both on Radio Nacional de España (RNE) and on Televisión Española (TVE).

== Early life and education ==
Socorro was born in Venezuela to Canarian parents and has dual nationality. Her family returned to Gran Canaria, when she was only six years old and in Spain where she developed her professional career. She began studying medicine at the University of La Laguna (Tenerife), a course that she did not complete. She studied contemporary dance and started in the world of modeling. She took the modeling course while continuing her studies with the goal of becoming an actress.

== Career ==
Socorro's first contact with the media was as a television presenter, for the children's contest "Repaso" presented by Paco Montesdeoca on TVE Canarias. She made her debut in the top 40, in La Pardilla, Telde and later worked at Radio Club Tenerife of the SER network with Las noches de Carnaval.

In 1990, Socorro won competitive examinations to work at Radio Nacional de España where she presented various programs of the station, among them Mojo Picón.3 In 1992, she made the leap to TVE presenting summer programs and the broadcast of the Fallas of 1993. In 1995, she participated in the program Sobrenatural where she co-starred with Roberto Cruz and Juan José Plans in the radio adaptation of Frankenstein, a fourteen-episode serial. She continued to be linked to this program and its successor, Historas, albeit not permanently, until the end of 1999, starring in the stories La madriguera del gusano blanco, El juego de los niños and Los misterios del castillo, among others. In 1999, she was a host on RNE's Radio 1's Cita con Pilar, a program that she presented on RNE1 and then on RNE3 until 2006. It was the first radio program that implanted a webcam in the studio.

Also in 2000, she presented the La 2 program Enrédate, a contest dedicated to the Internet. In 2001 she published a manual on the use of cyberspace, "Internet told with simplicity" (2001) and in 2003 "Better alone than in bad company". In 2006, she was a member of the board of directors of the Academy of Television Arts and Sciences chaired by Manuel Campo Vidal. From September 2008 to August 2009, she presented and directed the program Otros acentos on Radio 5 Todo Noticias and Radio Exterior. In 2010, she directed and presented the TVE program "Canarias Mediodía" in the Canary Islands.

Since 2015, she has been the presenter and director of España.com on Radio Exterior and "Cita previa".
