= Bellpuig =

- Municipality
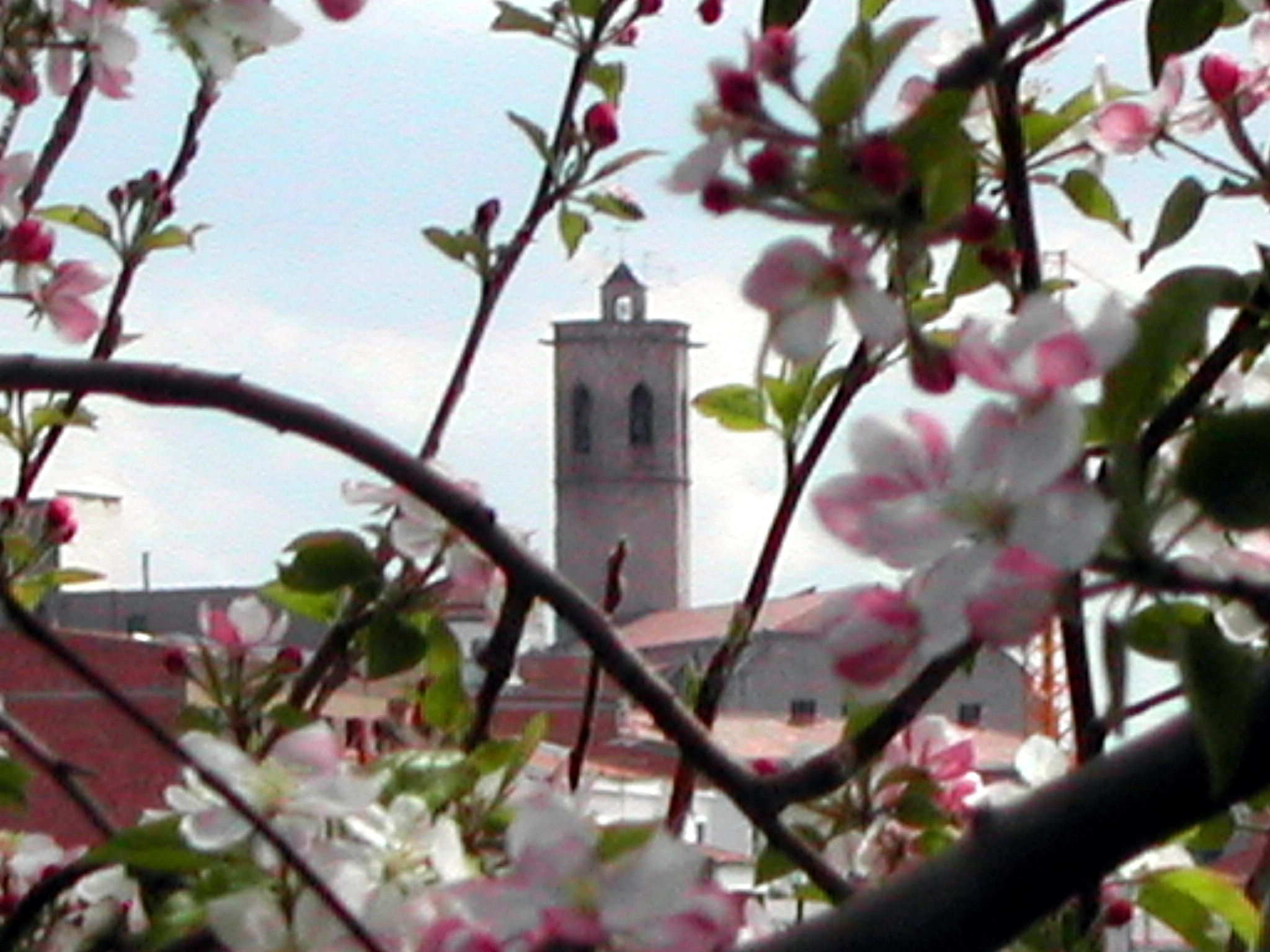

- Flag Coat of arms

- Location in Catalonia
- Coordinates: 41°37′36″N 1°0′48″E
- Autonomous community: Catalonia
- Province: Lleida
- Comarca: Urgell

Government
  - Mayor: Jordi Estiarte Berenguer (2019) (ERC)

Area
  - Total: 35.0 km^{2} (13.5 sq mi)
- Elevation: 308 m (1,010 ft)

Population (2025-01-01)
  - Total: 5,510
  - Density: 157/km^{2} (408/sq mi)
- Postal code: 25250
- Website: bellpuig.cat

Bellpuig (Catalan pronunciation: [ˌbeʎˈputʃ]) is a town in the comarca (county) of Urgell in Catalonia, Spain.

Nowadays Bellpuig is the third-most-important town in the area of Urgell. The town, located between the three little hills appearing on the flag, is served by Bellpuig railway station.

It has a population of 5,510 (register office, 2025).

== People ==
Bellpuig in 1487 was the birthplace of Ramón de Cardona, Baron of Bellpuig, Count of Oliveto and Duke of Soma (in Catalan, Ramon Folc III de Cardona-Anglesola). He was a Catalan general of the Holy League troops and viceroy of Naples from 1509 to 1522. His funeral monument is in Bellpuig, where his body was transported nine years after his death on 10 March 1522. The monument was designed and built by Giovanni da Nola and Genoese master sculptors, it is one of the most important examples of Renaissance art in Spain.

== Events ==
The Festival of the Verge dels Dolors takes place every year and includes a religious procession. This celebration is more than 300 years old.

== Sports ==
The village has one of the most important Motocross facilities in the south of Europe. The Circuit de Motocros Montperler held many national and international competitions in the past.

== Twin towns ==
- Bormio, Italy
