= Rafa García (basketball) =

Spanish basketball player

Rafael José García Salamé (born 27 June 2000) is a Spanish professional basketball player for Obradoiro of the Liga ACB.
