= Blanca Álvarez Mantilla =

Spanish journalist (1931–2000)

- Born: November 18, 1931; Madrid, Spain
- Died: July 5, 2000 (aged 68); Madrid, Spain
- Occupation: Journalist
- Years active: 1957–1970

Blanca Álvarez Mantilla (November 18, 1931 in Madrid – July 5, 2000 in Madrid) was a Spanish journalist, best known for being a pioneering presenter for Spanish television.

== Biography ==
From 1950 through 1955 Álvarez worked for youth magazines including Threshold, and Alba. She enrolled in Journalism School in 1956 and also worked for newspapers Pueblo and Madrid in 1957 and 1958.

Álvarez joined Televisión Española (TVE) February 10 of 1957 and from 1958 until 1970 alternated as the host with the editor of the news services, also occupying the posts of Head of the Technical Secretariat of Programs, Chief of the Technical Secretariat Documentation, Editor of the magazine " Tele-Radio" (1958–1960), Head of Children's Programs at various periods between 1970 and 1985 and Executive Producer of cultural programs until 1992, culminating her television career coordinating the production unit for retransmissions of rhythmic gymnastics and handball in the Barcelona Olympics.

Under her leadership, Televisión Española produced and presented highly regarded youth television news programs, theater, literature and sports for children and youth, and imported programs tailored to the audience of his country such as "Sesame Street", "Pippi Longstocking", "The Fraguel", "The Storyteller", European animated short films, and various drama series.

Between 1975 and 1977 Alvarez taught Journalistic Writing in the School of Information Sciences.

As Programming Professor at the Institute of Broadcasting Officer in the 1970s, both in her work as a teacher and his day-to-day work in TVE trained several generations of programmers on public television.

In the 1980s Alvarez worked on radio programs such as "A 120".

She appeared in front of the camera as a presenter for several shows, including the daily TVE newscast "Telediario" (1958–1970), "Weekend" (1963–1964), and "Standard of living" (1968–1970).

In 2000 she received the Gold Antenna.

Alvarez was co-founder of the Spanish Academy of Sciences and Television Arts and served as a Board member until her death.

== Personal life ==
Alvarez was the mother of seven children, six of whom are now professionals in film, advertising and television.

== Career as a presenter ==
- "Telediario" (1957–1970)
- "Towards Fame" (1957)
- "Appointment with music" (1957–1958)
- "Gossip outdoor" (1957–1958)
- "New Faces" (1957–1958)
- "Questions to space" (1958)
- "Weekend" (1963–1964)
- "Consult your doctor" (1968)
- "Standard of living" (1968–1970)
