= Canal Parlamento =

Spanish legislative broadcaster

- Country: Spain
- Broadcast area: Spain
- Headquarters: Madrid

Programming
- Language(s): Spanish
- Picture format: 576i (16:9 SDTV)

Ownership
- Owner: Congress of Deputies
- Sister channels: Canal Senado

History
- Launched: 1 April 2000; 25 years ago

Links
- Website: congreso.es

Canal Parlamento is a Spanish TV channel dedicated to broadcast live coverage of Spanish Courts from Congreso de los Diputados in Madrid, Spain.
