= 2017 in Spain =

- Decades: 1990s; 2000s; 2010s; 2020s; 2030s
- See also: History of Spain; Timeline of Spanish history; List of years in Spain

The following lists events in the year 2017 in Spain.

== Incumbents ==
- Monarch: Felipe VI
- Prime Minister: Mariano Rajoy

=== Regional presidents ===
- Andalusia: Susana Diaz
- Aragón: Javier Lambán
- Asturias: Javier Fernandez
- Balearic Islands: Francina Armengol
- Basque Country: Iñigo Urkullu
- Canary Islands: Fernando Clavijo Batlle
- Cantabria: Miguel Ángel Revilla
- Castilla–La Mancha: Emiliano García-Page
- Castile and León: Juan Vicente Herrera
- Catalonia: Quim Torra
- Extremadura: Guillermo Fernández Vara
- Galicia: Alberto Núñez Feijóo
- La Rioja: José Ignacio Ceniceros
- Community of Madrid: Cristina Cifuentes
- Region of Murcia: Pedro Antonio Sánchez (until 4 April), Fernando López Miras (starting 3 May)
- Navarre: Uxue Barkos
- Valencian Community: Ximo Puig
- Ceuta: Juan Jesús Vivas
- Melilla: Juan José Imbroda

== Events ==
=== January ===
- 3 January – More than 1100 migrants fight with riot police on the border to the town of Ceuta.

=== February ===
- 17 February – Iñaki Urdangarin (Brother-in-Law of Spain's King), found guilty of evading taxes
- 18 February – Protest «Volem acollir»

=== July ===
- 2017 Spain transportation strikes
- 28 July – 2017 Barcelona train crash

=== August ===
- 17 August – 2017 Barcelona attack

=== October ===
- 1 October – 2017 Catalan independence referendum
- 3 October – General strike in Catalonia against police violence in the referendum.
- 27 October – The Catalan Parliament declares the Independence of the Catalan Republic from Spain. The Spanish government imposes direct rule to Catalonia.

=== November ===
- 8 November – General strike in Catalonia against the Catalan imprisoned leaders.

=== December ===
- 21 December – Elections to the Catalan Parliament (21D).

== Popular culture ==
=== Sports ===
- 6 to 8 January – 2017 International Tournament of Spain (handball)
- 6 to 19 March – FIS Freestyle Ski and Snowboarding World Championships 2017 in Sierra Nevada
- 24 to 30 April – 2017 Barcelona Open Banco Sabadell (tennis)
- 19 August to 10 September – 2017 Vuelta a España (cycling)

=== Film ===
- 4 February – 31st Goya Awards presented, to honour the best in Spanish films of 2016

== Deaths ==
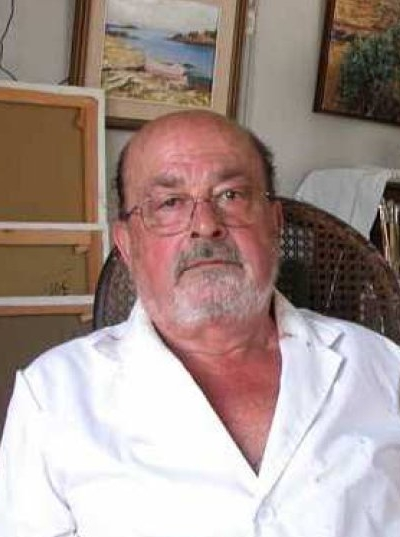
Jordi Pagans i Monsalvatje

- 1 January – Moruca, footballer (b. 1932)
- 4 January – Jordi Pagans i Monsalvatje, painter (b. 1932)
- 15 January – Luis Gámir, politician (b. 1942)
- 23 January – Bimba Bosé, model, designer, actress and singer (b. 1975)
- 1 March - Alejandra Soler, politician and schoolteacher (b. 1913)
- 27 March - Leoncio Afonso, geographer (b. 1916)
- 5 June – Juan Goytisolo, poet, essayist, and novelist (b. 1931)
- 5 July – Joaquín Navarro-Valls, Spanish-Vatican academic, journalist and physician (b. 1936)
- 3 September – Joan Colom, photographer (born 1921)
- 5 September – Eloísa Álvarez, politician, Mayor of Soria (1999–2003), Deputy (2004–2011) and Senator for Soria (2011–2015) (born 1956)
- 7 September – Tomás Villanueva, politician, Vice President of Castile and León region (2001–2003) (born 1953; heart attack)
- 8 September – José Antonio Souto, jurist, academic and politician, Mayor of Santiago de Compostela 1979–1981 (born 1938)
- 12 September – Xohana Torres, Galician language writer, poet, narrator and playwright (born 1931)
- 16 September – Bautista Álvarez, Galician nationalist politician (born 1933)
- 19 September – José Salcedo, film editor, Goya winner (1989, 1996, 2000) (born c.1949)
- 28 September – Antonio Isasi-Isasmendi, Spanish film director and producer (born 1927)
- 4 October – Jesús Mosterín, anthropologist and philosopher of science (born 1941)
