= 2007 in Spain =

- Decades: 1980s; 1990s; 2000s; 2010s; 2020s
- See also: History of Spain; Timeline of Spanish history; List of years in Spain

Events in the year 2007 in Spain.

== Incumbents ==
- Monarch: Juan Carlos I
- Prime Minister: José Luis Rodríguez Zapatero

=== Regional presidents ===
- Andalusia: Manuel Chaves
- Aragón: Marcelino Iglesias
- Asturias: Vicente Álvarez Areces
- Balearic Islands: Jaume Matas (until 6 July), Francesc Antich (starting 6 July)
- Basque Country: Juan José Ibarretxe
- Canary Islands: Adán Martín Menis (until 13 July), Paulino Rivero (starting 13 July)
- Cantabria: Miguel Ángel Revilla
- Castilla–La Mancha: José María Barreda
- Castile and León: Juan Vicente Herrera
- Catalonia: José Montilla
- Extremadura: Juan Carlos Rodríguez Ibarra (until 29 June), Guillermo Fernández Vara (starting 29 June)
- Galicia: Emilio Pérez Touriño
- La Rioja: Pedro Sanz
- Community of Madrid: Esperanza Aguirre
- Region of Murcia: Ramón Luis Valcárcel
- Navarre: Miguel Sanz
- Valencian Community: Francisco Camps
- Ceuta: Juan Jesús Vivas
- Melilla: Juan José Imbroda

== Events ==
- February 12: Iberian Peninsula earthquake
- February 18: Andalusian constitutional referendum
- May 27: Spanish regional elections, elections to the Aragonese Corts, elections to the Corts Valencianes
- MV New Flame

== Arts and entertainment ==
In film, Solitary Fragments by Jaime Rosales won the Best film award at the Goya Awards. For a list of Spanish films released in 2007 see Spanish films of 2007.

In music, D'Nash with I Love You Mi Vida were the Spanish entry in the Eurovision Song Contest. Violadores del Verso won the award for Best Spanish Act at the MTV Europe Music Awards.

== Sports ==
- In auto racing, Felipe Massa won the Formula One Spanish Grand Prix. Bruno Senna won the feature race and Timo Glock won the sprint race at the Spanish GP2 round. For other events see: 1000km of Valencia and the Spanish Formula Three season.
- In basketball, Spain hosted the EuroBasket won by Russia with Spain second. Real Madrid won the ACB season finals and Winterthur Barcelona won the Copa del Rey de Baloncesto.
- In cycling, Denis Menchov won the Vuelta a España. Spain hosted the UCI Track Cycling World Championships. For other events see: Tour of the Basque Country, Volta a Catalunya, Volta a Lleida and Clásica de San Sebastián.
- In football (soccer), Real Madrid won La Liga and Real Valladolid won the Segunda División.
- In tennis, Meghann Shaughnessy won the singles and Nuria Llagostera Vives and Arantxa Parra Santonja won the couples at the Barcelona KIA.
- Events in other sports: Spanish International Badminton Tournament (badminton), Nestea European Championship Final (beach volleyball), Figure skating at the 2007 European Youth Olympic Festival (figure skating), Valencia Superbike World Championship round (motorcycle racing) and America's Cup (sailing).

== Births ==
- April 29: Infanta Sofía of Spain, second child of Felipe, Prince of Asturias and Princess Letizia
- July 13: Lamine Yamal, football player

== Deaths ==
- April 22: Francisco Rodríguez Pascual, Spanish humanist and anthropologist (b. 1927)
- May 9: Mauro Galindo, Spanish dancer, choreographer and instructor (b. 1958)
- August 28: Antonio Puerta, footballer (b. 1984)

== See also ==
- 2007 in Spanish television
- List of Spanish films of 2007
