= 2013 in Spain =

- Decades: 1990s; 2000s; 2010s; 2020s; 2030s
- See also: History of Spain; Timeline of Spanish history; List of years in Spain

Events of 2013 in Spain

== Incumbents ==
- Monarch: Juan Carlos I
- Prime Minister: Mariano Rajoy

=== Regional presidents ===
- Andalusia: José Antonio Griñán (until 5 September), Susana Díaz (starting 5 September)
- Aragón: Luisa Fernanda Rudi
- Asturias: Javier Fernandez
- Balearic Islands: José Ramón Bauzá
- Basque Country: Iñigo Urkullu
- Canary Islands: Paulino Rivero
- Cantabria: Ignacio Diego
- Castilla–La Mancha: María Dolores de Cospedal
- Castile and León: Juan Vicente Herrera
- Catalonia: Artur Mas
- Extremadura: José Antonio Monago
- Galicia: Alberto Núñez Feijóo
- La Rioja: Pedro Sanz
- Community of Madrid: Ignacio Gonzalez
- Region of Murcia: Ramón Luis Valcárcel
- Navarre: Yolanda Barcina
- Valencian Community: Alberto Fabra
- Ceuta: Juan Jesús Vivas
- Melilla: Juan José Imbroda

== Events ==
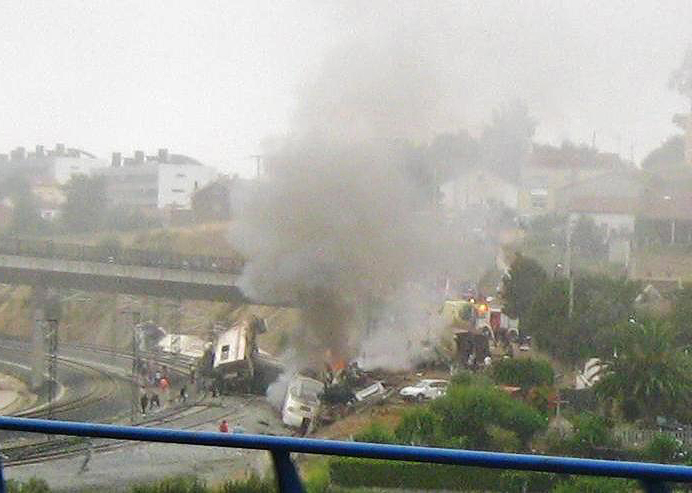
Santiago de Compostela derailment

- 30 January – The Spanish newspaper El País publishes accounting information - which will be known as Bárcenas affair - revealing the alleged payment of bonuses to the Spanish People's Party leaders from undeclared contributions from businesses.
- 12 May--Nico Rosberg - a German/Finish driver for Mercedes-Benz in Formula One won the forty-third running of the Spanish Gran Prix-held at the Circuit de Barcelona-Catalunya. Spanish driver Fernando Alonso finished fifth.
- 8 July – Nine people have died and 21 were injured after a bus careered off the road near the central town of Avila.
- 24 July – The Santiago de Compostela derailment kills seventy seven.
- September – Miss Universe Spain 2013
- 28 October – A gas leak at a coal mine has killed six people and left five injured.

== Births in 2013 ==
- January 22 – Milan Piqué, son of Shakira & Gerard Piqué

== Deaths in 2013 ==
- January 6
  - Jon Ander López, 36, Spanish footballer, heart attack.
  - Enrique Meneses, 83, Spanish photographer.
- January 8 – Manuel Mota, 46, Spanish fashion designer, suicide.
- January 12 – Anna Lizaran, 68, Spanish actress, cancer.
- February 9 – Leonardo Polo, 87, Spanish philosopher.
- February 10 – Eugenio Trías Sagnier, 70, Spanish philosopher.
- March 2 – Francesca Forrellad, 85, Spanish writer, aneurysm.
- March 28 – Manuel García Ferré, 83, Spanish cartoonist, complications of heart surgery.
- April 2 – Jesús Franco, 82, Spanish filmmaker.
- April 3 – Mariví Bilbao, 83, Spanish actress (La que se avecina, Aquí no hay quien viva), natural causes.
- May 7 – Joseba Larrinaga, 45, Spanish Paralympic athlete.
- May 9 – Ramón Blanco, 61, Spanish football player and manager (RCD Mallorca, Cadiz), cerebral infarction.
- June 6 – Rafael Marquina, 91, Spanish architect.
- June 9 – Elías Querejeta, 78, Spanish film producer.
- July 4 – Javier Artiñano, 70, Spanish film costume designer.
- July 10 – Concha García Campoy, 54, Spanish radio and television journalist, leukemia.
- August 4 – Inmaculada Cruz, 52, Spanish politician, member of the Senate (since 2011).
- September 1 – Manuel Andrés, 83, Spanish writer and actor.
- October 3 – Ángeles Santos Torroella, 101, Spanish painter.
- October 11 – María de Villota, 33, Spanish racing driver.
- November 7 – Amparo Rivelles, 88, Spanish actress.
- December 1 – Alfonso Armada, 93, Spanish general, co-leader of 1981 failed coup d'état.
- December 2 – Antonio Ansola, 82, Spanish footballer.
- December 4 - Joana Raspall i Juanola, 100, Spanish writer and librarian

== See also ==
- 2013 in Spanish television
- List of Spanish films of 2013
