= 2015 in Spain =

- Decades: 1990s; 2000s; 2010s; 2020s; 2030s
- See also: Other events of 2015; List of years in Spain

Events of 2015 in Spain.

== Incumbents ==
- Monarch: Felipe VI
- Prime Minister: Mariano Rajoy

=== Regional presidents ===
- Andalusia: Susana Díaz
- Aragón: Luisa Fernanda Rudi (until 5 July), Javier Lambán (starting 5 July)
- Asturias: Javier Fernandez
- Balearic Islands: José Ramón Bauzá (until 2 July), Francina Armengol (starting 2 July)
- Basque Country: Iñigo Urkullu
- Canary Islands: Paulino Rivero (until 9 July), Fernando Clavijo Batlle (starting 9 July)
- Cantabria: Ignacio Diego (until 3 July), Miguel Ángel Revilla (starting 4 July)
- Castilla–La Mancha: María Dolores de Cospedal (until 4 July), Emiliano García-Page (starting 4 July)
- Castile and León: Juan Vicente Herrera
- Catalonia: Artur Mas
- Extremadura: José Antonio Monago (until 1 July), Guillermo Fernández Vara (starting 1 July)
- Galicia: Alberto Núñez Feijóo
- La Rioja: Pedro Sanz (until 7 July), José Ignacio Ceniceros (starting 7 July)
- Community of Madrid: Ignacio Gonzalez (until 24 June), Cristina Cifuentes (starting 24 June)
- Region of Murcia: Alberto Garre (until 4 July), Pedro Antonio Sánchez (starting 4 July)
- Navarre: Yolanda Barcina (until 20 July), Uxue Barkos (starting 20 July)
- Valencian Community: Alberto Fabra (until 25 June), Ximo Puig (starting 25 June)
- Ceuta: Juan Jesús Vivas
- Melilla: Juan José Imbroda

== Events ==
- 26 January – An F-16 jet belonging to the Hellenic Air Force crashes in southern Spain during a NATO exercise, killing ten people and injuring 21.

== Deaths ==
- 5 January – Antonio Fuertes, 85, Spanish footballer (Valencia, Elche).
- 7 January
  - José Arias, 92, Olympic alpine skier (1948).
  - Ricardo Bueno Fernández, 74, politician, member of the Senate (1977–1979, 1993–2000) and Congress of Deputies (2000–2004).
- 12 January – Germán Cobos, 87, actor
- 16 January – Pedro María Iguaran, 74, footballer (Real Sociedad).
- 29 January – Amparo Baró, 77, Spanish actress (Siete mesas de billar francés), cancer.
- 31 January – José Manuel Lara Bosch, 68, Spanish media executive, CEO of Grupo Planeta (since 2003) and Atresmedia (since 2012), pancreatic cancer.

== See also ==
- 2015 in Spanish television
- List of Spanish films of 2015
