= 2009 in Spain =

- Decades: 1980s; 1990s; 2000s; 2010s; 2020s
- See also: History of Spain; Timeline of Spanish history; List of years in Spain

Events in the year 2009 in Spain.

== Incumbents ==
- Monarch – Juan Carlos I
- Prime Minister – José Luis Rodríguez Zapatero

=== Regional presidents ===
- Andalusia:
  - until 7 April: Manuel Chaves
  - 7 April–22 April: Gaspar Zarrias
  - starting 22 April: José Antonio Griñán
- Aragón: Marcelino Iglesias
- Asturias: Vicente Álvarez Areces
- Balearic Islands: Francesc Antich
- Basque Country: Juan José Ibarretxe (until 7 May), Patxi López (starting 7 May)
- Canary Islands: Paulino Rivero
- Cantabria: Miguel Ángel Revilla
- Castilla–La Mancha: José María Barreda
- Castile and León: Juan Vicente Herrera
- Catalonia: José Montilla
- Extremadura: Guillermo Fernández Vara
- Galicia: Emilio Pérez Touriño (until 18 April), Alberto Núñez Feijóo (starting 18 April)
- La Rioja: Pedro Sanz
- Community of Madrid: Esperanza Aguirre
- Region of Murcia: Ramón Luis Valcárcel
- Navarre: Miguel Sanz
- Valencian Community: Francisco Camps
- Ceuta: Juan Jesús Vivas
- Melilla: Juan José Imbroda

== Events ==
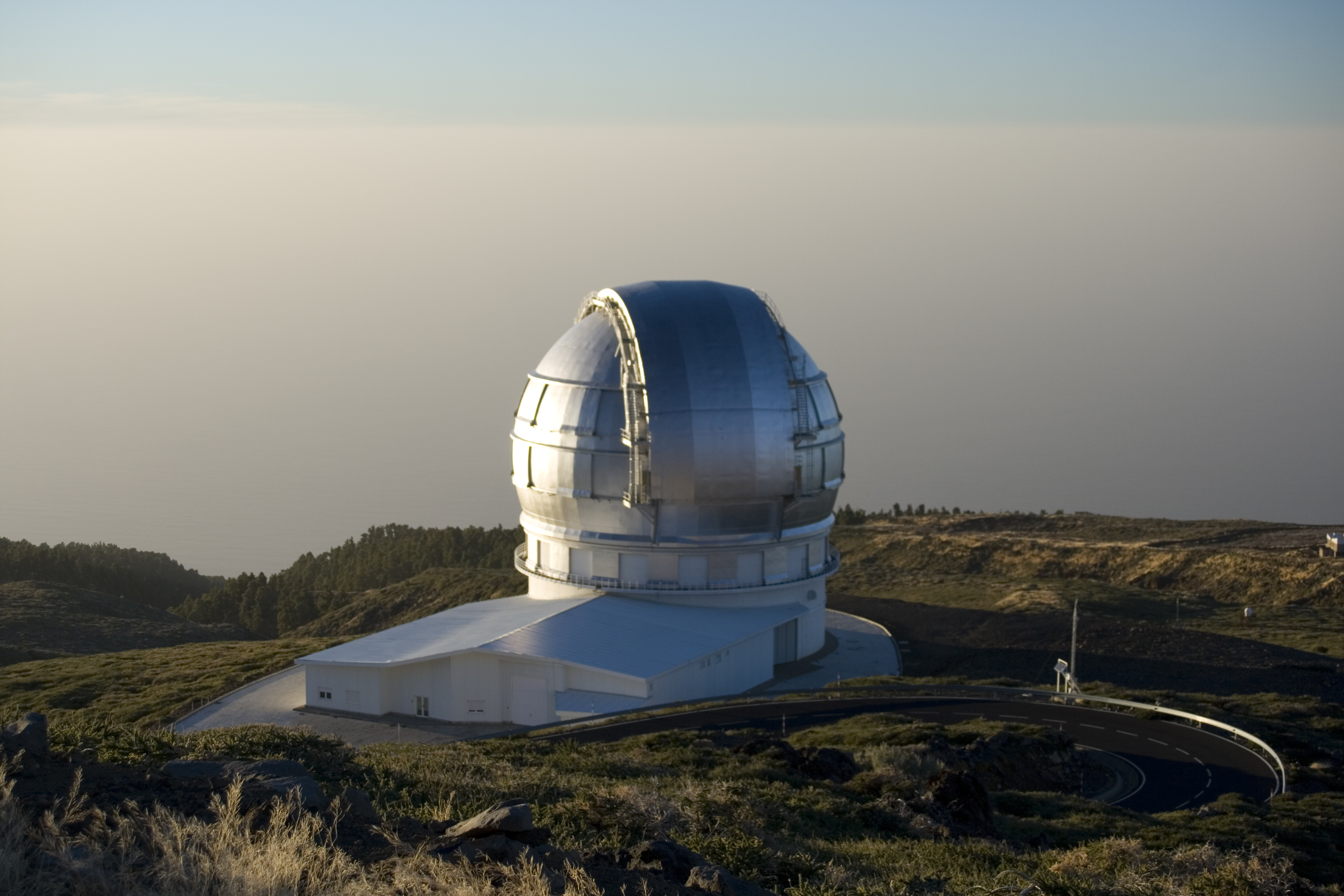
The Gran Telescopio Canarias, the world's largest reflecting telescope, is inaugurated on July 24

- March 1 – The Basque Nationalist Party wins a plurality of seats in Spain's Basque Country's parliamentary elections.
- May 18 – Italian Camorra leader Raffaele Amato is arrested in Marbella, Spain.
- June 19 – A bomb explodes near Bilbao in the Basque region of Spain, killing one policeman.
- July 10 – One person is killed by a bull, the first such fatality in 14 years, during the Running of the Bulls in Pamplona, Spain.
- July 21 – Foreign Minister Miguel Ángel Moratinos becomes the first Spanish government official to visit Gibraltar in 300 years.
- July 24 – The Gran Telescopio Canarias, the world's largest reflecting telescope, is inaugurated by King Juan Carlos I of Spain.
- July 29 – 2009 Burgos bombing: A car bomb explodes outside a police barracks in the northern Spanish city of Burgos, injuring dozens of people.
- July 30 – 2009 Palmanova bombing: At least two people are killed in a car bomb explosion at a Guardia Civil barracks in Palma Nova on the Spanish island of Mallorca.
- August 9 – Three bombs explode on the island of Majorca, Spain.
- November 17 – The Spanish ship Alakrana and its crew of 36 are released after a US$3.5 million ransom is paid.

=== Film ===
- February 22 – Penélope Cruz wins the Academy Award for Best Supporting Actress for the film Vicky Cristina Barcelona, the first Spanish actress to win an Academy Award.
- September 28 – Spain's Pablo Pineda wins the best actor award at the San Sebastián International Film Festival, the first actor with Down's syndrome to win an international film award.
- 2009 – Dance to the Spirits documentary film is released.

==== Highest-grossing films ====
Highest-grossing films of 2009 in Spain
Rank	Title	Nation	Gross
1	Up	United States	€23,957,870
2	Ice Age: Dawn of the Dinosaurs	United States	€21,197,890
3	Agora	Spain	€18,532,500
4	Angels & Demons	United States	€15,518,330
5	Harry Potter and the Half-Blood Prince	United Kingdom/United States	$13,633,800
6	Gran Torino	United States	$12,747,330
7	New Moon	United States	$12,646,590
8	The Curious Case of Benjamin Button	United States	$12,168,450
9	Slumdog Millionaire	United Kingdom	$10,569,130
10	Inglourious Basterds	Germany/United States	$10,416,820

=== Television ===
- 2009 in Spanish television

=== Sport ===
- February 1 – Rafael Nadal of Spain defeats Roger Federer of Switzerland to win the 2009 Australian Open men's singles.
- March 15 – Luis León Sánchez wins the Paris–Nice.
- May 13 – FC Barcelona wins the Spanish Cup.
- May 16 – FC Barcelona wins the Liga.
- May 27 – FC Barcelona wins the UEFA Champions League and becomes the first Spanish team to win the treble.
- June 13–14 – Marc Gené, as part of the Peugeot Sport Total team, wins the 24 Hours of Le Mans.
- June 30 – July 3 − The Spanish team wins 83 medals (28 gold, 21 silver, 34 bronze) at the 2009 Mediterranean Games.
- July 26 – Alberto Contador wins the Tour de France.
- August 23 – FC Barcelona wins the Spanish Super Cup.
- August 28 – FC Barcelona wins the UEFA Super Cup.
- September 20 – Spain wins the EuroBasket 2009.
- September 20 – Alejandro Valverde wins the Vuelta a España.
- October 17 – Alberto Contador finishes first in the UCI World Ranking.
- December 13 – Alemayehu Bezabeh wins the European Cross Country Championships.
- December 19 – FC Barcelona wins the FIFA Club World Cup and becomes the first team to win six competitions in one year.

== Notable deaths ==
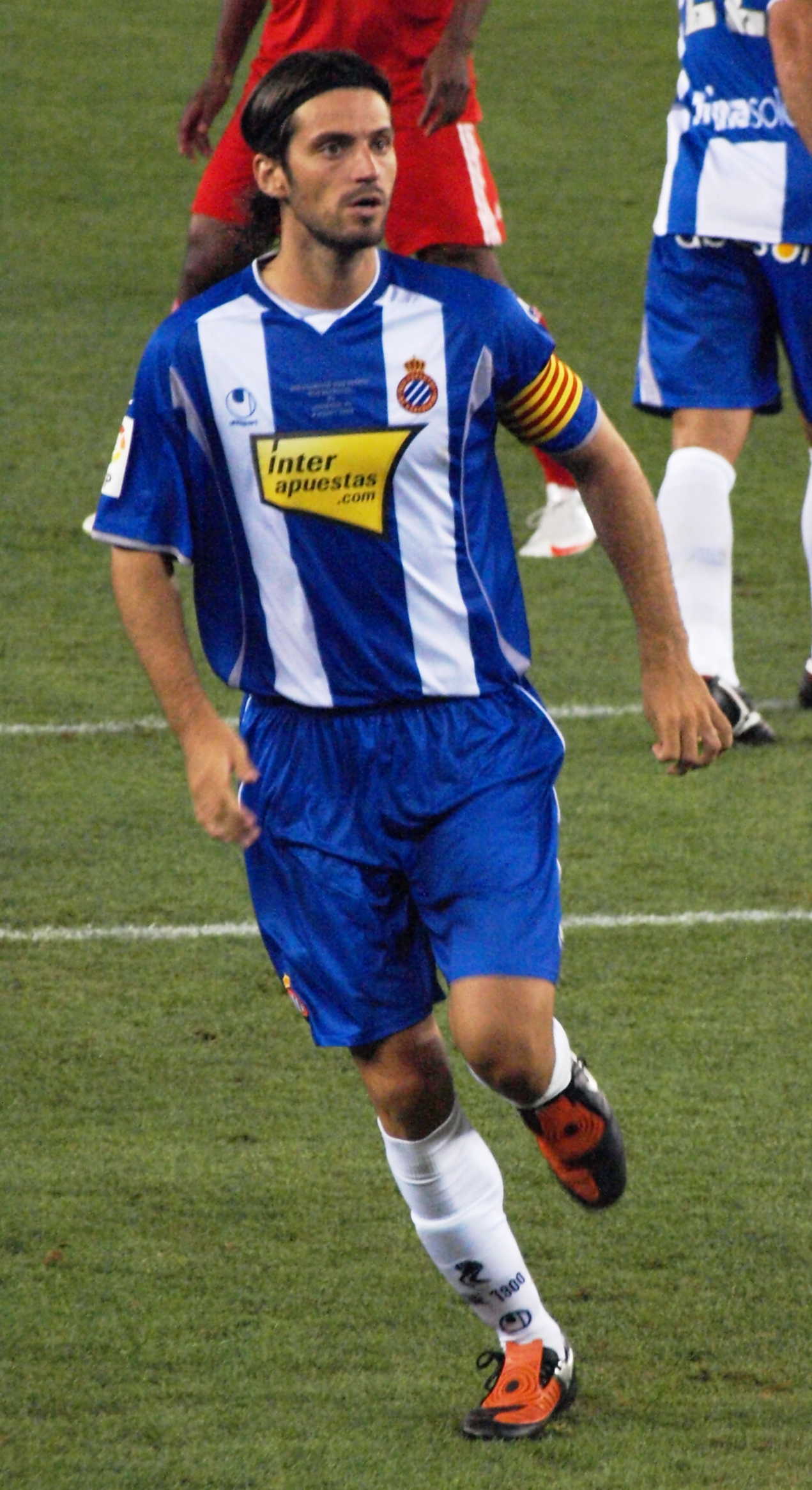
Daniel Jarque

- January 6 – Manuela Fernández-Fojaco, 113, Spanish supercentenarian, verified oldest person in Europe.
- February 14 – Luís Andrés Edo, 82, Spanish anarchist.
- March 1 – Pepe Rubianes, 61, Spanish Catalan actor and theatre director, lung cancer.
- April 6 – Mari Trini, 61, Spanish pop singer and actress.
- April 11 – Corín Tellado, 81, Spanish novelist, heart failure.
- April 13 – Ángel Miguel, 79, Spanish professional golfer.
- May 12
  - Antonio Vega, 51, Spanish pop singer-songwriter (Nacha Pop), pneumonia.
  - Nemesio Fernández-Cuesta (1928–2009), 80, Spanish economist, businessman, journalist and politician.
- May 20 – María Amelia López Soliño, 97, Spanish blogger, world's oldest blogger.
- June 19 – Vicente Ferrer Moncho, 89, Spanish philanthropist.
- June 27 – Victoriano Crémer, 102, Spanish poet and journalist, natural causes.
- July 1 – Baltasar Porcel, 72, Spanish Catalan writer, cancer.
- July 11 – Maria del Carmen Bousada de Lara, 69, Spanish woman believed to be world's oldest mother, cancer.
- August 5 – Jordi Sabater Pi, 87, Spanish ethologist, discovered albino gorilla Snowflake.
- August 8 – Daniel Jarque, 26, Spanish footballer, heart attack.
- August 11 – José Ramón García Antón, 61, Spanish engineer and politician in Valencian Community.
- August 27 – Joaquín Ruiz-Giménez, 96, Spanish politician.
- September 1 – Maria Christina of Bourbon-Parma, 84, Spanish royal (House of Bourbon-Parma), daughter of Elias, Duke of Parma.
- September 19 – Víctor Israel, 80, Spanish actor.
- September 25 – Alicia de Larrocha, pianist (born 1923)
- September 30 – Rafael Arozarena, 86, Spanish writer and poet.
- October 16 – Andrés Montes, 53, Spanish sports commentator.
- October 18 – Ignacio Ponseti, 95, Spanish physician and inventor (Ponseti method).
- October 26 – Sabino Fernández Campo, 91, Spanish Chief of the Royal House, key figure in failed 23-F coup d'état.
- November 2 – José Luis López Vázquez, 87, Spanish actor, after long illness.
- November 3 – Francisco Ayala, novelist (born 1906)
- November 12 – Dámaso Ruiz-Jarabo Colomer, 60, Spanish judge, Advocate-General of the European Court of Justice.
- November 30 – Paul Naschy, 75, Spanish actor, screenwriter and director, pancreatic cancer.
- December 5 – Manuel Prado y Colón de Carvajal, 78, Spanish diplomat.
- December 11 – Francisco Piquer Chanza, 87, Spanish actor.
- December 17 – Albert Ràfols-Casamada, 86, Spanish artist.
- December 30 – Ivan Zulueta, 66, Spanish designer and film director.

== See also ==
- List of Spanish films of 2009
