= 2006 in Spain =

- Decades: 1980s; 1990s; 2000s; 2010s; 2020s
- See also: History of Spain; Timeline of Spanish history; List of years in Spain

Events in the year 2006 in Spain.

== Incumbents ==
- Monarch: Juan Carlos I
- Prime Minister: José Luis Rodríguez Zapatero

=== Regional presidents ===
- Andalusia: Manuel Chaves
- Aragón: Marcelino Iglesias
- Asturias: Vicente Álvarez Areces
- Balearic Islands: Jaume Matas
- Basque Country: Juan José Ibarretxe
- Canary Islands: Adán Martín Menis
- Cantabria: Miguel Ángel Revilla
- Castilla–La Mancha: José María Barreda
- Castile and León: Juan Vicente Herrera
- Catalonia: Pasqual Maragall (until 28 November), José Montilla (starting 28 November)
- Extremadura: Juan Carlos Rodríguez Ibarra
- Galicia: Emilio Pérez Touriño
- La Rioja: Pedro Sanz
- Community of Madrid: Esperanza Aguirre
- Region of Murcia: Ramón Luis Valcárcel
- Navarre: Miguel Sanz
- Valencian Community: Francisco Camps
- Ceuta: Juan Jesús Vivas
- Melilla: Juan José Imbroda

== Events ==
- March 27: Spain's sixth terrestrial television broadcaster, La Sexta, starts programming.
- November 28: Ciberobn, a public research consortium is founded.
- December 30: A bombing at the Barajas Airport in Madrid kills two people and injures twenty. ETA claims responsibility.

== Births ==
- January 18: Iyana Martín, basketball player
- April 20: Dean Berta Viñales, Spanish motorcycle rider (d. 2021)
- June 17: Awa Fam, basketball player

== Deaths ==
- March 25: Rocío Durcal, singer and actress
- June 1: Rocío Jurado, singer and actress
- November 26: Isaac Gálvez López, cyclist

== See also ==
- 2006 in Spanish television
- List of Spanish films of 2006
