= 1932 in Spain =

- Decades: 1910s; 1920s; 1930s; 1940s; 1950s
- See also: History of Spain; Timeline of Spanish history; List of years in Spain

Events in the year 1932 in Spain.

== Incumbents ==
- President: Niceto Alcalá-Zamora
- President of the Council of Ministers of Spain: Manuel Azaña

== Events ==
- Radio Ourense begins transmitting in Ourense.

== Births ==
- 16 February - Antonio Ordóñez, bullfighter (died 1998)
- 30 April - Antonio Tejero, army officer and attempted coup leader (died 2026)
- 19 June - José Sanchis Grau, comic writer (died 2011)
- 11 August – Fernando Arrabal, writer
- 25 September - Adolfo Suárez, politician (died 2014)

== See also ==
- List of Spanish films of the 1930s
- Sanjurjada
