= 1935 in Spain =

- Decades: 1910s; 1920s; 1930s; 1940s; 1950s
- See also: Other events of 1935; List of years in Spain

Events in the year 1935 in Spain.

== Incumbents ==
- President: Niceto Alcalá-Zamora
- Prime Minister:
  - until 26 September: Alejandro Lerroux
  - 26 September-15 December: Joaquín Chapaprieta
  - starting 15 December: Manuel Portela Valladares

== Births ==
- March 30 - Eusebio Ríos, football player and manager (d. 2008)
- May 2 - Luis Suárez, footballer (d. 2023)
- June 30 - Lola Herrera, actress
- August 30 - Felipe Fernández García, Catholic bishop (d. 2012)
- December 2 - José Antonio González Casanova, lawyer and politician (d. 2021)

== Deaths ==
- 5 March – Roque Ruaño, priest and civil engineer (b. 1877)
- 12 March – Patricio Arabolaza. (b. 1893)

== See also ==
- List of Spanish films of the 1930s
