= 1936 in Spain =

- Decades: 1910s; 1920s; 1930s; 1940s; 1950s
- See also: History of Spain; Timeline of Spanish history; List of years in Spain

Events in the year 1936 in Spain.

== Incumbents ==
- President: Manuel Azaña
- Prime Minister: Santiago Casares Quiroga until July 19, Francisco Largo Caballero

== Events ==
- July 17–18 – July 1936 military uprising in Melilla
- July 18–25 – July 1936 military uprising in Seville
- July 18–20 – Siege of Cuartel de la Montaña
- July 19 – July 1936 military uprising in Barcelona
- July 19–27 – Siege of Cuartel de Loyola
- July 19-August 16 – Siege of Gijón
- July 19-October 16 – Siege of Oviedo
- July 20–23 – July 1936 coup d'état in Granada
- July 21-September 27 – Siege of the Alcázar
- August 14 – Battle of Badajoz (1936)
- August 19-September 5 – Battle of Irún
- September 3 – Battle of Talavera de la Reina (1936)

== Births ==
- 7 March – Antonio Mercero, film director and screenwriter (d. 2018)
- 15 March – Francisco Ibáñez Talavera, cartoonist and writer (d. 2023)
- 4 May – El Cordobés, matador
- 18 May – Francisco Laína, politician (b. 2022)
- 3 July – Jerónimo Saavedra, president of the Canary Islands (d. 2023)
- 30 July – Infanta Pilar, Duchess of Badajoz, royal (d. 2020)
- 31 August – Fernando Abril Martorell, politician (d. 1998)

== Deaths ==
- July 12 – José Castillo (Spanish Civil War), police officer (born 1901)
- July 13 – José Calvo Sotelo, jurist and politician (born 1893)
- July 20 – José Sanjurjo, military officer (born 1872) and Francisco Ascaso, political activist (born 1901)
- July 30 – Joaquín Abati, writer (born 1865)
- August 4 – Antonio Azarola y Gresillón, naval officer (born 1874)
- August 5
  - José Manuel Puelles de los Santos, physician (born 1894)
  - Marcelino Valentín Gamazo, lawyer (born 1879)
- August 8 – Ceferino Giménez Malla, Roman Catholic activist (born 1861)
- August 11 – Blas Infante, politician and writer (born 1885)
- August 12
  - Blessed Victoria Díez Bustos de Molina, teacher and religious woman (born 1903)
  - Manuel Goded Llopis, general (born 1882)
- August 17 – José María of Manila, Catholic priest (born 1880) and Alexandre Bóveda, politician (born 1903)
- August 19 – Federico García Lorca, poet and playwright (born 1898)
- August 22 – Melquíades Álvarez (politician) (born 1864)
- August 23 – Julio Ruiz de Alda Miqueleiz, aviator (born 1897) and José María Albiñana, physician and politician (born 1883)
- August 31 – Joaquín Milans del Bosch, military officer (born 1854)
- September 5 – Federico Borrell García, militiaman (born 1912)
- September 29 – Alfonso Beorlegui Canet, army officer (born 1888)
- October 2 – Bartolomé Blanco, Catholic activist (born 1914)
- October 29 – Ramiro de Maeztu, writer and diplomat (born 1875) and Ramiro Ledesma Ramos, philosopher and politician (born 1905)
- November 20 – Buenaventura Durruti, revolutionary (born 1896) and José Antonio Primo de Rivera, politician (born 1903)
- November 28 – Pedro Muñoz Seca, playwright (born 1879)

== See also ==
- List of Spanish films of the 1930s
- Spanish Civil War

== Bibliography ==
- Thomas, Hugh. The Spanish Civil War. Penguin Books. 2001. London. ISBN 978-0-14-101161-5
