= 2010 in Spain =

- Decades: 1990s; 2000s; 2010s; 2020s; 2030s
- See also: History of Spain; Timeline of Spanish history; List of years in Spain

Events in the year 2010 in Spain.

== Incumbents ==
- Monarch: Juan Carlos I
- Prime Minister: José Luis Rodríguez Zapatero

=== Regional presidents ===
- Andalusia: José Antonio Griñán
- Aragón: Marcelino Iglesias
- Asturias: Vicente Álvarez Areces
- Balearic Islands: Francesc Antich
- Basque Country: Patxi López
- Canary Islands: Paulino Rivero
- Cantabria: Miguel Ángel Revilla
- Castilla–La Mancha: José María Barreda
- Castile and León: Juan Vicente Herrera
- Catalonia: José Montilla (until 24 December), Artur Mas (starting 24 December)
- Extremadura: Guillermo Fernández Vara
- Galicia: Alberto Núñez Feijóo
- La Rioja: Pedro Sanz
- Community of Madrid: Esperanza Aguirre
- Region of Murcia: Ramón Luis Valcárcel
- Navarre: Miguel Sanz
- Valencian Community: Francisco Camps
- Ceuta: Juan Jesús Vivas
- Melilla: Juan José Imbroda

== Events ==
=== January ===
- January 1 – Spain takes over the Presidency of the Council of the European Union from Sweden.
- The Supreme Court rules that negotiations held in 2006 between elected Basque officials and the banned nationalist party Batasuna did not constitute a criminal offense.

=== February ===
- February 17 – Multiple field visits are conducted by Human Rights Watch to large emergency centers for unaccompanied migrant children in the Canary Islands.

=== March ===
- March 7 – Tens of thousands demonstrate against an abortion bill in several Spanish cities.
- March 14 – Fernando Alonso of Spain wins the 2010 Bahrain Grand Prix Formula One race.

=== April ===
- April 24 – Around 60,000 people march in Madrid, with parallel demonstrations elsewhere in Spain and abroad, in support of Judge Baltasar Garzón, calling for justice for victims of Francoist Spain crimes.

=== May ===
- The government rejects several peer recommendations during its Universal Periodic Review at the UN Human Rights Council, including proposals to improve safeguards for terrorism detainees, and to establish an independent police complaints body.
- Judge Baltasar Garzón is suspended from judicial office, and faces trial for investigating alleged enforced disappearances during the Spanish Civil War and Francoist period.

=== June ===
- The parliament approves an overhaul of the criminal code, increasing penalties for more than 30 offenses and introducing post-sentence “supervised liberty” for terrorism and sexual crimes.

=== July ===
- July 4 – Rafael Nadal of Spain wins the men's singles titles at the 2010 Wimbledon Championships.
- July 10 – Between 1.1 and 1.5 million people, according to organisers, and 56000 demonstrators, according to Spanish protesters-counting specialized company Lynce, demonstrate in central Barcelona demanding greater autonomy for Catalonia within Spain.
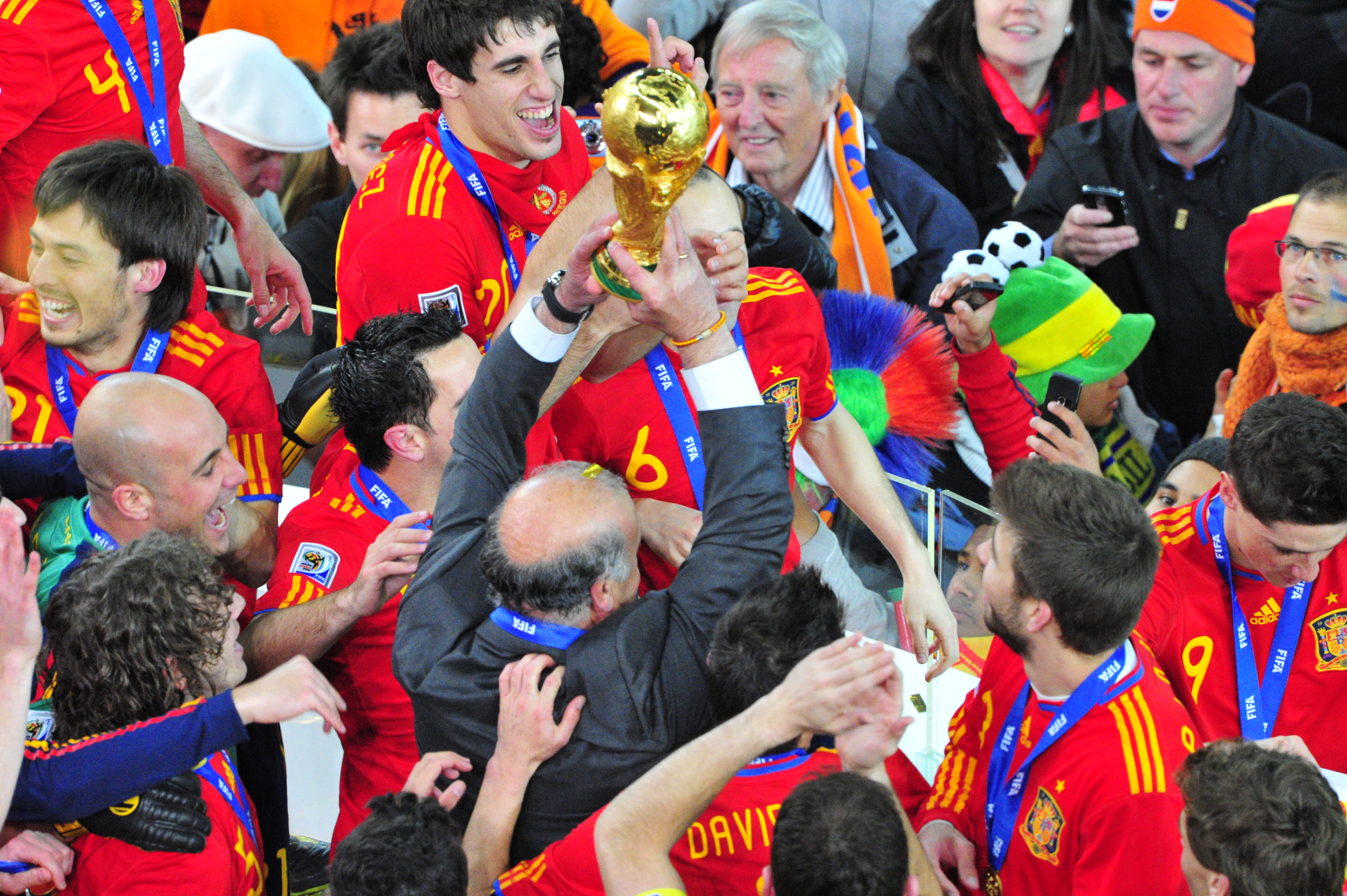
  Spain wins the 2010 FIFA World Cup
- July 11 –
  - Spain defeats the Netherlands by a score of one goal to nil in extra time of the 2010 FIFA World Cup Final to win the 2010 FIFA World Cup, with Andrés Iniesta scoring the winning goal.
  - Spanish film-maker Augusti Vila wins the main prize at the Karlovy Vary International Film Festival in the Czech Republic for his film The Mosquito Net.
- July 12 – Spain's victorious 2010 FIFA World Cup "campeones" return to Madrid where they are met by millions of people in the streets, the royal family and politicians.
- July 20 – Spain rejects a proposal to ban the burqa in public places; 183 to 162, with two abstaining.
- July 28 – The Spanish autonomous community of Catalonia bans bullfighting, the first region on the mainland to do so.

=== August ===
- August 19 – Forty people are injured after a bull leaps into a crowd in Tafalla, Spain; the bull is killed.

=== September ===
- September 27 – 95 people, including two former mayors and planning chief of Marbella, appear in court in Málaga in one of Spain's biggest corruption trials.

=== December ===
- Three Euskadi Ta Askatasuna (ETA) members are convicted for their roles in the 2006 Madrid–Barajas Airport bombing, serving maximum sentences of 40 years’ imprisonment each.

== Deaths ==
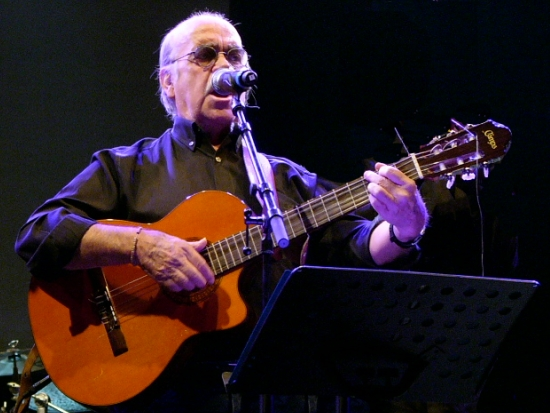
José Antonio Labordeta

- January 14 – Antonio Fontán, 86, Spanish politician and journalist.
- February 4 – Manuel Esteba, 68, Spanish film director.
- February 12 – Luis Molowny, 84, Spanish footballer, heart attack.
- March 12 – Miguel Delibes, Spanish author and journalist (born 1920)
- April 6 – Guillermo Luca de Tena, 82, Spanish journalist.
- April 21 – Juan Antonio Samaranch, Spanish sports official (born 1920)
- April 26 – Alberto Vitoria, 54, Spanish footballer, heart attack.
- April 29 – Tolo Calafat, 39, Spanish mountaineer, edema and exposure
- April 30 – Jordi Estadella, 61, Spanish voice actor, radio and television personality (Un, dos, tres... responda otra vez), after long illness.
- May 4 – Ángel Cristo, 65, Spanish animal tamer and circus promoter, cardiac arrest.
- May 12 – Antonio Ozores, 81, Spanish actor, cancer.
- May 15 – Juan José Carbó, 83, Spanish cartoonist.
- June 7 – José Albi, 88, Spanish poet.
- July 2 – Félix Pons, 68, Spanish politician, President of the Congress of Deputies (1986–1996), cancer.
- July 6 – José Rico Pérez, 92, Spanish businessman, President of Hércules CF.
- July 10 – Aldo Sambrell, 79, Spanish actor, stroke.
- July 14 – Eduardo Sánchez Junco, 67, Spanish businessman, founder and owner of Hello!.
- August 9 – Juan Marichal, 88, Spanish historian.
- August 9 – Fernando Fernández, 70, Spanish illustrator and comic artist, after long illness.
- August 17 – Alejandro Maclean, 41, Spanish television, film producer and aerobatics pilot, plane crash.
- August 18 – Carlos Hugo of Bourbon-Parma, Spanish aristocrat (born 1930)
- August 23 – Carlos Mendo, 77, Spanish journalist, founder of El País newspaper, after long illness.
- August 26 – Raimon Panikkar, Spanish theologian (born 1918)
- September 7 – Wilebaldo Solano, 94, Spanish communist activist during the Spanish Civil War.
- September 7 – Joaquín Soler Serrano, 91, Spanish journalist, Alzheimer's disease.
- September 15 – Raúl Trapero, 47, Spanish Olympic boxer, traffic accident.
- September 19 – José Antonio Labordeta, 75, Spanish songwriter, professor, writer, presenter and politician.
- October 4 – Gregorio Ros, 58, Spanish make-up artist, complications from a degenerative disease.

== See also ==
- List of Spanish films of 2010
- 2010 in Spanish television
