= 2012 in Spain =

- Decades: 1990s; 2000s; 2010s; 2020s; 2030s
- See also: History of Spain; Timeline of Spanish history; List of years in Spain

Events of 2012 in Spain.

== Incumbents ==
- Monarch: Juan Carlos I
- Prime Minister: Mariano Rajoy

=== Regional presidents ===
- Andalusia: José Antonio Griñán
- Aragón: Luisa Fernanda Rudi
- Asturias: Francisco Álvarez-Cascos (until 26 May), Javier Fernandez (starting 26 May)
- Balearic Islands: José Ramón Bauzá
- Basque Country: Patxi Lopez (until 15 December), Iñigo Urkullu (starting 15 December)
- Canary Islands: Paulino Rivero
- Cantabria: Ignacio Diego
- Castilla–La Mancha: María Dolores de Cospedal
- Castile and León: Juan Vicente Herrera
- Catalonia: Artur Mas
- Extremadura: José Antonio Monago
- Galicia: Alberto Núñez Feijóo
- La Rioja: Pedro Sanz
- Community of Madrid: Esperanza Aguirre (until 26 September), Ignacio Gonzalez (starting 26 September)
- Region of Murcia: Ramón Luis Valcárcel
- Navarre: Yolanda Barcina
- Valencian Community: Alberto Fabra
- Ceuta: Juan Jesús Vivas
- Melilla: Juan José Imbroda

== Events ==
- 13 May – Pastor Maldonado wins the Spanish Grand Prix, marking him the first Venezuelan Formula One driver to win a race.
- 1 July – Spain's national team wins UEFA Euro Final in Kyiv, Ukraine.
- 11 September - Some 1.5 million people take part in Catalonia's annual independence rally in Barcelona.

== Deaths ==
- 2 April – Pilar Fuertes Ferragut, 49, diplomat, road accident.

== See also ==
- 2012 in Spanish television
- List of Spanish films of 2012
