= 1934 in Spain =

- Decades: 1910s; 1920s; 1930s; 1940s; 1950s
- See also: History of Spain; Timeline of Spanish history; List of years in Spain

This article details events in the year 1934 in Spain.

== Incumbents ==
- President: Niceto Alcalá-Zamora
- Prime Minister:
  - until 29 April: Alejandro Lerroux
  - 29 April-5 October: Ricardo Samper
  - starting 5 October: Alejandro Lerroux

== Events ==
- January 9–11: founding of SEPU (Sociedad Española de Precios Únicos, S.A.) in Barcelona
- February 12–13: Juntas de Ofensiva Nacional-Sindicalista merges with Falange Española to form Falange Española de las Juntas de Ofensiva Nacional-Sindicalista
- May 19: founding of Tomiño FC
- October 4–19: Asturian miners' strike of 1934
- October 6: Events of October 6th in Catalonia, where a republic was declared
- founding of CE Alaior
- founding of Bertamiráns FC
- founding of CD Condal
- creation of Spain national basketball team

== Births ==
- 18 February - Paco Rabanne, fashion designer (died 2023)
- 26 March - Macià Alavedra, Spanish politician (died 2018)
- 16 April - Vicar, cartoonist (died 2012)
- 27 April - Antonio Ruiz-Pipò, pianist and composer (died 1997)
- 7 May - Miguel Irízar Campos, Roman Catholic bishop in Peru (died 2018)
- 14 July – Ángel del Pozo, actor (died 2025)
- 22 July - Gemma Cuervo, actress (died 2026)
- 6 August – Landelino Lavilla, Spanish politician (died 2020)
- 7 September - Manuel Cardona, physicist (died 2014)
- 1 October - Emilio Botín, Spanish banker (died 2014)
- 2 October - Olegario González de Cardedal, Catholic theologian and author
- 2 November - Enrique Collar, footballer (died 2025)
- 14 November - Juan Ramón Lacadena, Spanish agronomical engineer

== Deaths ==
- 1 August - Elías García Martínez, painter (born 1858)

== See also ==
- List of Spanish films of the 1930s
