= 1931 in Spain =

- Decades: 1910s; 1920s; 1930s; 1940s; 1950s
- See also: Other events of 1931; List of years in Spain

Events in the year 1931 in Spain.

== Incumbents ==
- Monarch: Alfonso XIII until 14 April
- President of the Council of Ministers of Spain (President): Niceto Alcalá-Zamora (starting 14 April)
- President of the Council of Ministers of Spain (Prime Minister):
  - until 18 February: Dámaso Berenguer
  - 18 February-14 April: Juan Bautista Aznar-Cabañas
  - 14 April-14 October: Niceto Alcalá-Zamora
  - starting 14 October: Manuel Azaña

== Events ==
=== Full date unknown ===
- Acción obrera newspaper from Ceuta is launched.

== Births ==
- February 11 - Agustín García-Gasco Vicente, cardinal (d. 2011)
- February 18 - Laura Valenzuela, television presenter (d. 2023)
- March 18 - Canito (d. 1998)
- March 23 - Gloria Begué Cantón, professor, jurist, senator and magistrate (d. 2016)
- September 7 – Josep Lluís Núñez, businessman and football club president (d. 2018)

== Deaths ==
- October 9 - Santiago Artigas, Spanish actor (b. 1881)

== See also ==
- List of Spanish films of the 1930s
