= 2008 in Spain =

- Decades: 1980s; 1990s; 2000s; 2010s; 2020s
- See also: Other events of 2008; List of years in Spain

The following lists events that happened during 2008 in the Kingdom of Spain.

== Incumbents ==
- Monarch: Juan Carlos I
- Prime Minister: José Luis Rodríguez Zapatero

=== Regional presidents ===
- Andalusia: Manuel Chaves
- Aragón: Marcelino Iglesias
- Asturias: Vicente Álvarez Areces
- Balearic Islands: Francesc Antich
- Basque Country: Juan José Ibarretxe
- Canary Islands: Paulino Rivero
- Cantabria: Miguel Ángel Revilla
- Castilla–La Mancha: José María Barreda
- Castile and León: Juan Vicente Herrera
- Catalonia: José Montilla
- Extremadura: Guillermo Fernández Vara
- Galicia: Emilio Pérez Touriño
- La Rioja: Pedro Sanz
- Community of Madrid: Esperanza Aguirre
- Region of Murcia: Ramón Luis Valcárcel
- Navarre: Miguel Sanz
- Valencian Community: Francisco Camps
- Ceuta: Juan Jesús Vivas
- Melilla: Juan José Imbroda

== Events ==
- March 9 – José Luis Rodríguez Zapatero is reelected as Prime Minister after defeating Mariano Rajoy.
- April 5 – Greenpeace announces that in November 2007 a radioactive leak was reported at the Ascó Nuclear Power Plant, but it was kept hidden from the press.
- August 20 – Spanair flight 5022 crashed just after takeoff from runway 36L of Barajas Airport, killing 154 of the 166 people on board.
- December 31 – A truck-bomb explodes near the EITB headquarters in Bilbao.
- 942 Dakar, historia de una familia, a documentary film is released.

== Births ==
- 11 August – Levi Díaz, Singer

== Deaths ==
- February 26 – Rogelio Baón, politician (born 1942)
- May 3 – Leopoldo Calvo-Sotelo, Prime Minister (1981–82)

== See also ==
- 2008 in Spanish television
- List of Spanish films of 2008
