= 2014 in Spain =

- Decades: 1990s; 2000s; 2010s; 2020s; 2030s
- See also: Other events of 2014; List of years in Spain

Events of 2014 in Spain.

== Incumbents ==
- Monarch: Juan Carlos I (abdicated 19 June), Felipe VI
- Prime Minister: Mariano Rajoy

=== Regional presidents ===
- Andalusia: Susana Díaz
- Aragón: Luisa Fernanda Rudi
- Asturias: Javier Fernandez
- Balearic Islands: José Ramón Bauzá
- Basque Country: Iñigo Urkullu
- Canary Islands: Paulino Rivero
- Cantabria: Ignacio Diego
- Castilla–La Mancha: María Dolores de Cospedal
- Castile and León: Juan Vicente Herrera
- Catalonia: Artur Mas
- Extremadura: José Antonio Monago
- Galicia: Alberto Núñez Feijóo
- La Rioja: Pedro Sanz
- Community of Madrid: Ignacio Gonzalez
- Region of Murcia: Ramón Luis Valcárcel (until 10 April), Alberto Garre (starting 10 April)
- Navarre: Yolanda Barcina
- Valencian Community: Alberto Fabra
- Ceuta: Juan Jesús Vivas
- Melilla: Juan José Imbroda

== Events ==
=== January ===
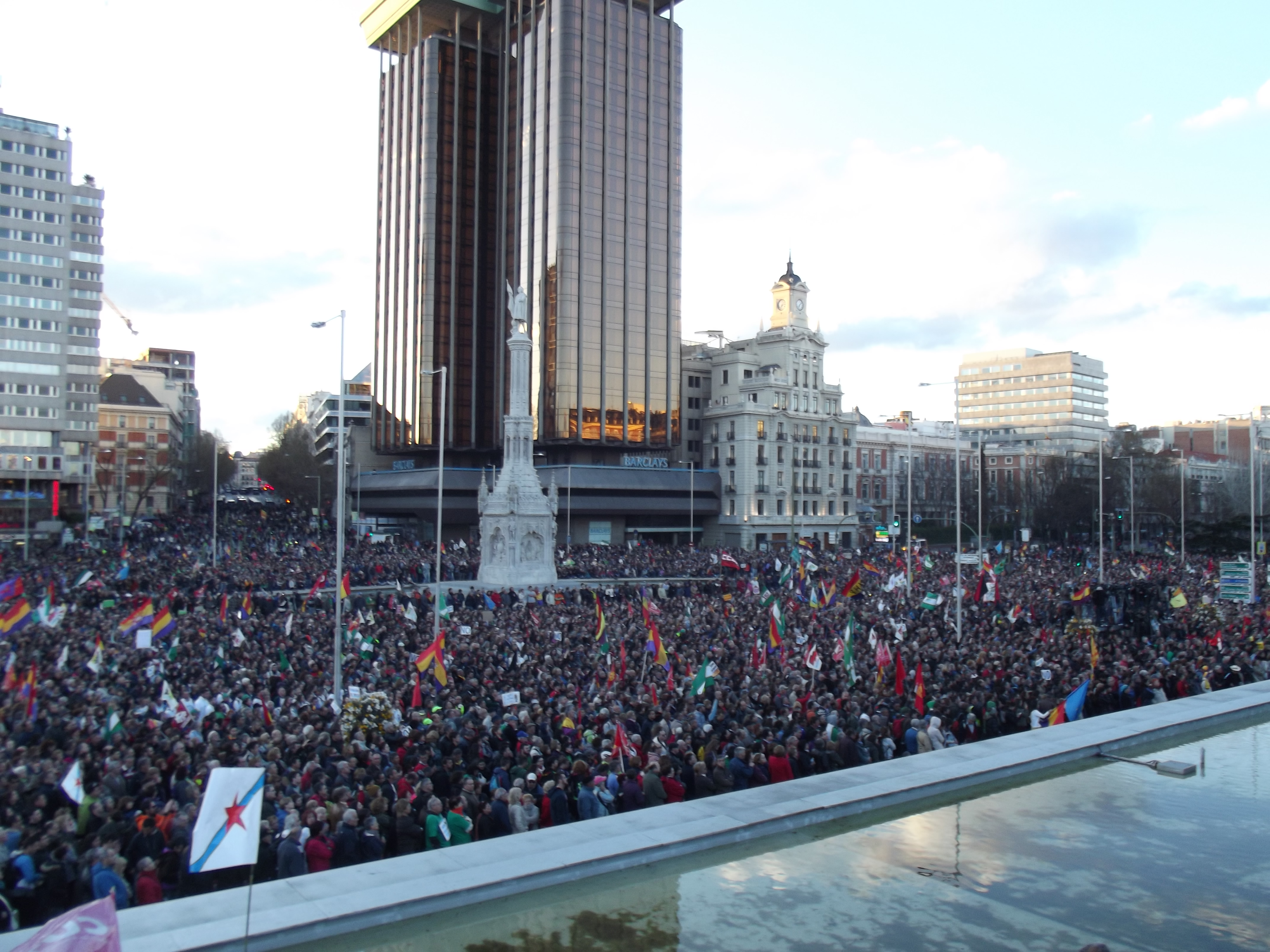
March for Dignity in Plaza de Colón, Madrid

- 3 January – the 75th anniversary of the Agencia EFE.
- 7 January – The infanta Cristina of Spain is charged by the judge hearing the Nóos case, with money laundering and tax crimes.
- 11 January – About 110,000 people march peacefully through Bilbao, demanding Basque independence and freedom for more than 600 ETA prisoners.
- 16 January – The socialist political party Podemos is founded by political academics amidst the 15-M Movement.

=== February ===
- 20 February – 20: Statements made by actor Javier Bardem in Paris during the presentation of a documentary produced by him on the human rights situation in Western Sahara causes a diplomatic row between France and Morocco.

=== March ===
- 11 March – The 10th anniversary of the 2004 Madrid train bombings
- 22 March – 101 people are injured and 29 arrested after an anti-austerity march turns violent in Madrid.

=== June ===
- 2 June – King Juan Carlos announces his intention to abdicate, after nearly 39 years on the throne. His son Felipe, Prince of Asturias, is to succeed him. The announcement of the pending abdication is followed by large anti-monarchy demonstrations in Madrid and Barcelona.
- 19 June – King Juan Carlos I abdicates in favour of his son, King Felipe VI. Felipe is enthroned at the Congress building in Madrid, in a ceremony that does not include coronation. He then travels with his family to the Royal Palace in a Rolls-Royce and appears on the balcony to wave to crowds.

=== July ===
- 9 July – France denies having amended its penal policy by moving 2 ETA convicts to the prison in Mont-de-Marsan; closest to the Basque Country, which was their main region of operation.

=== November ===
- 9 November – The Catalan people vote in a referendum on whether and how they should exercise self-determination. The unionist government in Madrid does not recognise the authority of the vote.
- 18 November – UNESCO declares the Camino de Santiago of Spain as a World Heritage Site in Danger.

== Deaths ==
- 1 February – Luis Aragonés, 75, footballer and manager
- 25 February – Paco de Lucía, 66, flamenco composer, guitarist and producer
- 23 March – Adolfo Suárez, 81, 138th Prime Minister of Spain

== See also ==
- 2014 in Spanish television
- List of Spanish films of 2014
