= 2016 in Spain =

- Decades: 1990s; 2000s; 2010s; 2020s; 2030s
- See also: Other events of 2016; List of years in Spain

The following lists events in the year 2016 in Spain.

== Incumbents ==
- Monarch: Felipe VI
- Prime Minister: Mariano Rajoy

=== Regional presidents ===
- Andalusia: Susana Diaz
- Aragón: Javier Lambán
- Asturias: Javier Fernandez
- Balearic Islands: Francina Armengol
- Basque Country: Iñigo Urkullu
- Canary Islands: Fernando Clavijo Batlle
- Cantabria: Miguel Ángel Revilla
- Castilla–La Mancha: Emiliano García-Page
- Castile and León: Juan Vicente Herrera
- Catalonia: Artur Mas (until 11 January), Carles Puigdemont (starting 11 January)
- Extremadura: Guillermo Fernández Vara
- Galicia: Alberto Núñez Feijóo
- La Rioja: José Ignacio Ceniceros
- Community of Madrid: Cristina Cifuentes
- Region of Murcia: Pedro Antonio Sánchez
- Navarre: Uxue Barkos
- Valencian Community: Ximo Puig
- Ceuta: Juan Jesús Vivas
- Melilla: Juan José Imbroda

== Events ==
- February 6 – 30th Goya Awards in Madrid
- April 9-15 – 2016 IIHF World Championship Division II Group A in Jaca
- 15 May – After the crash between Lewis Hamilton and Nico Rosberg, Max Verstappen wins the Spanish Grand Prix, marking him F1's youngest ever winner and the first Dutch winner.

== Deaths ==
- December 27 – Gloria Begué Cantón, professor, jurist, senator and magistrate (b. 1931)

== See also ==
- 2016 in Spanish television
- List of Spanish films of 2016
