= 2011 in Spain =

- Decades: 1990s; 2000s; 2010s; 2020s; 2030s
- See also: History of Spain; Timeline of Spanish history; List of years in Spain

Events of 2011 in Spain.

== Incumbents ==
- Monarch: Juan Carlos I
- Prime Minister: José Luis Rodríguez Zapatero (until 21 December), Mariano Rajoy (starting 21 December)

=== Regional presidents ===
- Andalusia: José Antonio Griñán
- Aragón: Marcelino Iglesias (until 13 July), Luisa Fernanda Rudi (starting 13 July)
- Asturias: Vicente Álvarez Areces (until 15 July), Francisco Álvarez-Cascos (starting 15 July)
- Balearic Islands: Francesc Antich (until 18 June), José Ramón Bauzá (starting 18 June)
- Basque Country: Patxi López
- Canary Islands: Paulino Rivero
- Cantabria: Miguel Ángel Revilla (until 23 June), Ignacio Diego (starting 23 June)
- Castilla–La Mancha: José María Barreda (until 22 June), María Dolores de Cospedal (starting 22 June)
- Castile and León: Juan Vicente Herrera
- Catalonia: Artur Mas
- Extremadura: Guillermo Fernández Vara (until 4 July), José Antonio Monago (starting 4 July)
- Galicia: Alberto Núñez Feijóo
- La Rioja: Pedro Sanz
- Community of Madrid: Esperanza Aguirre
- Region of Murcia: Ramón Luis Valcárcel
- Navarre: Miguel Sanz (until 1 June), Yolanda Barcina (starting 1 June)
- Valencian Community: Francisco Camps (until 28 July), Alberto Fabra (starting 28 July)
- Ceuta: Juan Jesús Vivas
- Melilla: Juan José Imbroda

== Events ==
- 1 May – an earthquake struck Lorca, Murcia.
- 15 May – nationwide protests against the economic and political situation.
- 22 May – Spanish local elections, 2011.
- October, The ETA, a Basque militant separatist group, definitively ends armed activity.
- 20 November – general election, won by the People's Party whose leader is Mariano Rajoy.

== Births ==
- 11 February – Luna Fulgencio, actress

== Deaths ==
- 7 May – Seve Ballesteros, golfer (born 1957)
- 23 May – Xavier Tondó, cyclist (born 1978)

== See also ==
- 2011 in Spanish television
- List of Spanish films of 2011
- 2011 in the European Union
