= 1938 in Spain =

- Decades: 1910s; 1920s; 1930s; 1940s; 1950s
- See also: History of Spain; Timeline of Spanish history; List of years in Spain

Events from the year 1938 in Spain.

== Incumbents ==
- President: Manuel Azaña
- Prime Minister: Juan Negrín

== Events ==
- February 5–7 - Battle of Alfambra
- March 5–6 - Battle of Cape Palos
- March 7-April 19 - Aragon Offensive
- March 16–17 - Battle of Caspe
- March 16–19 - Bombing of Barcelona
- April 1–3 - Battle of Gandesa (1938)
- April 14-June 16 - Battle of Bielsa pocket
- May 25 - Bombing of Alicante
- May 31 - Bombing of Granollers
- July 25-November 16 - Battle of the Ebro
- November 7 - Bombing of Cabra

== Births ==
- January 5 - Juan Carlos I of Spain
- March 5 - Jordi Dauder, actor (d. 2011)
- March 10 - Lorenzo Palomo, composer and conductor (d. 2024)
- May 10 - Manuel Santana, tennis player (d. 2021)
- May 11 - Joan Margarit, poet (d. 2021)
- June 2 - Carlos Garaikoetxea, Basque politician (d. 2026)
- July 28 - Luis Aragones, football player and manager (d. 2014)

== Deaths ==
- 11 January - Juan de la Cierva y Peñafiel, lawyer and politician (b. 1864)
- 29 January - Armando Palacio Valdés, writer (b. 1853)
- 9 April - Manuel Carrasco Formiguera (b. 1890)
- 14 May - Miguel Cabanellas (b. 1872)

== See also ==
- List of Spanish films of the 1930s
