= 2016 in Spanish television =

This is a list of Spanish television related events from 2016.

== Events ==
- 1 February – Canal+ is replaced by the new channel #0.
- 21 April – TV Channel Be Mad, is launched.
- 28 April – Two new channels start broadcasting: Ten and DKiss. Real Madrid TV broadcasts Free-to-air for the first time.
- 1 June – Sport TV Channel GOL (currently known as GOL PLAY) is launched.
- 22 August – TV channel Canal+ Liga stops broadcasting.
- 28 November – HBO operates in Spain for the first time.

== Debuts ==
Title	Channel	Debut	Performers/Host	Genre
La gran ilusión	La Sexta	2016-01-05	El Mago Pop	Variety Show
El Xef	Cuatro	2016-01-10	Dabiz Muñoz	Cooking Show
Todo sobre el amor	Antena 3	2016-01-11		Dating Show
Late Motiv	Movistar+	2016-01-11	Andreu Buenafuente	Late Night
Soy Noticia	Cuatro	2016-01-16	Nacho Medina	News Magazine
Likes	Movistar+	2016-01-28	Raquel Sánchez Silva	Science/Culture
Web Therapy	Movistar+	2016-02-02	Eva Hache	Sitcom
Super Shore	MTV	2016-02-02		Dating Show
A mi manera	La Sexta	2016-02-03		Music
Expediente abierto	Mega	2016-02-04		Investigation
Cuestión de tiempo	La 1	2016-02-08	Patricia Gaztañaga	Talk Show
Buscando el norte	Antena 3	2016-02-10	Antonio Velázquez and Silvia Alonso	Sitcom
Enviado Especial	La Sexta	2016-02-11	Jalis de la Serna	Docureality
Dos días y una noche	Antena 3	2016-02-12	Susanna Griso	Talk Show
Got Talent	Telecinco	2016-02-13	Santi Millán	Talent Show
El ojo clínico	La 2	2016-02-14	Ana Gugel	Talk Show
Toma partido	Cuatro	2016-02-22	Miguel Ángel Oliver	Talk Show
Minuto 0	Movistar+	2016-02-29	Joseba Larrañaga and Dani Garrido.	sport
¿Qué me pasa, doctor	La Sexta	2016-03-03	Bartolomé Beltrán	Science/Culture
Cintora a pie de calle	Cuatro	2016-03-14	Jesús Cintora	Investigation
El Caso. Crónica de sucesos	La 1	2016-03-15	Fernando Guillén Cuervo and Verónica Sánchez	Drama Series
1, 2, 3... hipnotízame	Antena 3	2016-03-23	Manel Fuentes	Variety Show
Tabú: Jon Sistiaga	Movistar+	2016-03-31	Jon Sistiaga	Investigation
Top Dance	Antena 3	2016-04-04	Manel Fuentes	Talent Show
Quiero ser monja	Cuatro	2016-04-10		Reality Show
Aquí mando yo	Antena 3	2016-04-15	Miki Nadal	Docureality
First Dates	Cuatro	2016-04-17	Carlos Sobera	Dating Show
Mi casa es la tuya	Telecinco	2016-04-25	Bertín Osborne	Talk Show
La embajada	Antena 3	2016-04-25	Belén Rueda	Drama Series
9 meses con Samanta	Cuatro	2016-05-04	Samanta Villar	Docureality
El hombre de tu vida	La 1	2016-05-26	José Mota	Sitcom
Feis to feis	Cuatro	2016-05-27	Joaquín Reyes	Comedy
90 minuti	Real Madrid TV	2016-06-08	Miki Nadal	Comedy
Desafía tu mente	La 1	2016-06-14	Antonio Lobato	Science/Culture
Dime qué fue de ti	La 1	2016-06-29	Teresa Viejo	Reality Show
Desafío 2016	La 1	2016-06-30	Almudena Cid and Jaime Alguersuari	Game Show
Trabajo temporal	La 1	2016-07-06		Docudrama
Paquita Salas	Flooxer	2016-07-06	Brays Efe	Sitcom
Quiero ser	Telecinco	2016-07-20	Sara Carbonero	Talent Show
En el punto de mira	Cuatro	2016-07-26		Investigation
Eso lo hago yo	La Sexta	2016-07-08	Carlos Sobera	Talent Show
Las Campos	Telecinco	2016-08-18	María Teresa, Terelu Campos & Carlota Corredera	Docureality
Hazte un selfi	Cuatro	2016-09-05	Uri Sabat	Variety Show
El cazador de cerebros	La 2	2016-09-10		Science/Culture
Destinos de película	La 1	2016-09-12	Màxim Huerta	Travel
La sonata del silencio	La 1	2016-09-13	Marta Etura and Eduardo Noriega	Drama Series
Pacífico	La 2	2016-09-14	Daniel Landa	Documentary
Héroes invisibles	La 2	2016-09-16		Documentary
Tips	La 2	2016-09-19	Ruth Jiménez	Variety Show
LocoMundo	Movistar+	2016-09-20	Quequé	Comedy
Poder canijo	La 1	2016-10-02	Juan y Medio	Variety Show
El amor está en el aire	Antena 3	2016-10-04	Juan y Medio	Dating Show
Hora punta	La 1	2016-10-10	Javier Cárdenas	Variety Show
OT: El Reencuentro	La 1	2016-10-17		Music
Celebrity MasterChef	La 1	2016-11-06	Eva González	Cooking Show
Fuera de cobertura	Cuatro	2016-11-07		Documentary
Convénzeme	Be Mad	2016-11-13	Mercedes Milá	Science/Culture
Amores perros	Cuatro	2016-11-15		Docureality
Espinete no existe	La 1	2016-11-20	Eduardo Aldán	Comedy
Lo que escondían sus ojos	Telecinco	2016-11-22	Blanca Suárez and Rubén Cortada	Miniseries
Be the Best	Be Mad	2016-11-28	Rafa Lomana	Sport
Lunnis de leyenda	Clan	2016-12-03	Lucrecia, narrator−presenter	Children
Cervantes contra Lope	La 1	2016-12-05	José Coronado and Emilio Gutiérrez Caba	TV-Movie
El padre de Caín	Telecinco	2016-12-06	Quim Gutiérrez	Miniseries
Ciudades españolas Patrimonio de la Humanidad	La 2	2016-12-10		Documentary
22 ángeles	La 1	2016-12-12	María Castro, Pedro Casablanc and Octavi Pujades	TV-Movie
Yo fui a EGB	TNT	2016-12-21	Anabel Alonso	Quiz Show

== Television shows ==
- La 1
  - Telediario (1957– )
  - Informe Semanal (1973– )
  - Telepasión española (1990– )
  - Los Desayunos de TVE (1994–2020)
  - Cine de barrio (1995– )
  - Corazón (1997– )
  - Cuéntame cómo pasó (2001–2023)
  - España Directo (2005–2022)
  - Comando actualidad (2008– )
  - Españoles en el mundo (2009 – )
  - La Mañana de La 1 (2009–2020)
  - Audiencia abierta (2012– )
  - Flash Moda (2012– )
  - El Debate de la 1 (2012–2017)
  - MasterChef (2013– )
  - MasterChef Junior (2013– )
  - Viaje al centro de la tele (2013– )
  - Aquí la Tierra (2014– )
  - Amigas y conocidas (2014–2018)
  - Ochéntame otra vez (2014–2021)
  - Seis Hermanas (2015–2017)
  - Seguridad vital (2015–2018)
  - Centro médico (2015–2019)
  - Torres en la cocina (2015–2019)
  - El ministerio del tiempo (2015–2020)
  - Acacias 38 (2015–2021)
- Telecinco
  - Informativos Telecinco (1990– )
  - Survivor Spain (2000– )
  - Big Brother Spain (2000–2017)
  - Gran Hermano VIP (2004–2019)
  - El Programa de Ana Rosa (2005– )
  - Pasapalabra (2007–2019)
  - Survivor Spain (2006– )
  - La que se avecina (2007– )
  - Pasapalabra (2007–2019)
  - Mujeres y Hombres y Viceversa (2008–2018)
  - Sálvame (2009– )
  - Deluxe (2009– )
  - ¡Qué tiempo tan feliz! (2009–2017)
  - La Voz (2012–2017)
  - La Voz Kids (2014–2018)
  - Cámbiame (2015–2018)
- La 2
  - Al filo de lo imposble (1982– )
  - Pueblo de Dios (1982– )
  - Últimas preguntas (1983– )
  - En portada (1984– )
  - Metrópolis (1985– )
  - Documentos TV (1986– )
  - Tendido cero (1986– )
  - Días de cine (1991– )
  - La Aventura del saber (1992– )
  - Jara y sedal (1992– )
  - La 2 noticias (1994–2020)
  - La noche temática, (1995– )
  - Agrosfera (1997– )
  - El escarabajo verde (1997– )
  - Saber y ganar (1997– )
  - El Cine de La 2 (1998– )
  - Versión española (1998– )
  - Aquí hay trabajo (2000– )
  - España en comunidad (2000–2020)
  - Shalom (2003– )
  - Cámara abierta 2.0 (2007–)
  - Página 2 (2007– )
  - En lengua de signos (2008– )
  - Zoom tendencias (2008– )
  - Fábrica de ideas (2008–2017)
  - RTVE responde (2009– )
  - Imprescindibles (2010– )
  - Para todos la Dos (2010– )
  - Cómo nos reímos (2012– )
  - ¡Atención obras! (2013– )
  - Cachitos de hierro y cromo (2013– )
  - Órbita Laika (2014–)
  - Millenium (2014–2019)
  - 80 cm (2015–)
  - El cazador de cerebros (2015–)
  - Historia de nuestro cine (2015–)
- Antena 3
  - Antena 3 Noticias (1990– )
  - Espejo público (1996– )
  - La ruleta de la fortuna (2006– )
  - Karlos Arguiñano en tu cocina (2010– )
  - Tu cara me suena (2011– )
  - El Hormiguero (2011– )
  - El secreto de Puente Viejo (2011–2020)
  - ¡Ahora caigo! (2011–2021)
  - Centímetros cúblicos (2012– )
  - Amar es para siempre (2013– )
  - Me resbala (2013–2021)
  - Top Chef (2013–2017)
  - ¡Boom! (2014–2022)
  - Casados a primera vista (2015–2018)
  - Allí abajo (2015–2019)
- La Sexta
  - El Intermedio (2006– )
  - La Sexta Noticias (2006– )
  - Salvados (2008– )
  - Al rojo vivo (2011– )
  - La Sexta columna (2012– )
  - Más vale tarde (2012– )
  - Pesadilla en la cocina (2012–2020)
  - Equipo de investigación (2013– )
  - Jugones (2013– )
  - El objetivo (2013–2022)
  - Zapeando (2013– )
  - La Sexta noche (2013–2022)
  - El jefe infiltrado (2014– )
- Cuatro
  - Cuarto milenio (2005– )
  - Noticias Cuatro (2005–2019)
  - Supernanny (2006–2017)
  - Las mañanas de Cuatro (2006–2018)
  - Hermano mayor (2009–2017)
  - Granjero busca esposa (2009–2018)
  - ¿Quién quiere casarse con mi hijo? (2012–2017)
  - Planeta Calleja (2014– )
  - Chester (2014– )
  - Volando voy (2015– )
  - Los Gipsy Kings (2015–2021)

== Ending this year ==
- La 1
  - Águila Roja (2009–2016)
  - Carlos, rey emperador (2015–2016)
  - En la tuya o en la mía (2015–2016)
  - Estadio 1 (2015–2016)
  - Esto es vida (2015–2016)
  - José Mota presenta... (2015–2016)
  - Olmos y Robles (2015–2016)
- La 2
  - La Mitad invisible (2010–2016)
  - Diario de un nómada (2015–2016)
  - Seguridad Vital (2015–2016)
- Antena 3
  - Velvet (2014–2016)
  - Bajo sospecha (2015–2016)
  - Mar de plástico (2015–2016)
  - Locked Up (2015–2016)
- Cuatro
  - 21 días (2009–2016)
  - Gym Tony (2014–2016)
  - Conexión Samanta (2010–2016)
- Telecinco
  - B&b, de boca en boca (2014–2016)
  - Chiringuito de Pepe (2014–2016)
  - Hable con ellas (2014–2016)
  - El Príncipe (2014–2016)
  - Levántate (2015–2016)
- La Sexta
  - Policías en acción (2013–2016)
  - ¿Y tú qué sabes? (2015–2016)

== Changes of network affiliation ==
Show	Moved From	Moved To
Pekín Express (2008–2016)	Antena 3	La Sexta

== Deaths ==
- 13 January – Ignacio Salas, host, 70.
- 13 February – Conchita Goyanes, actress, 69.
- 21 February – Eugenio Martín Rubio, meteorologist, 93.
- 30 March – Francisco Algora, actor, 67.
- 4 May – Ángel de Andrés López, actor, 64.
- 19 May – Miguel Lluch, director, 93.
- 20 May – Miguel de la Quadra-Salcedo, reporter, 84.
- 11 July – Emma Cohen, actress, 69.
- 29 September – Amparo Valle, actress, 79.
- 17 October – Elena Santonja, hostess, 84.
- 9 November – La Veneno, vedette, 52.

== See also ==
- 2016 in Spain
