= 1933 in Spain =

- Decades: 1910s; 1920s; 1930s; 1940s; 1950s
- See also: History of Spain; Timeline of Spanish history; List of years in Spain

Events in the year 1933 in Spain.

== Incumbents ==
- President: Niceto Alcalá-Zamora
- President of the Council of Ministers:
  - until September 12: Manuel Azaña
  - September 12 - October 9: Alejandro Lerroux
  - October 9 - December 16: Diego Martínez Barrio
  - starting December 16: Alejandro Lerroux

== Events ==
- January 11 - Casas Viejas incident
- November 5 - 1933 Basque Statute of Autonomy referendum

== Births ==
- March 3 - Alfredo Landa, actor (d. 2013)
- March 12 – Jesús Gil, politician, construction businessman, and football team owner (d. 2004)
- March 16 - Teresa Berganza, opera singer (d. 2022)
- April 12 - Montserrat Caballé, opera singer (d. 2018)
- April 16 - Marcos Alonso Imaz, footballer (d. 2012)
- June 7 - Juan Uriarte, Roman Catholic prelate (d. 2024)
- July 6 - Antonio Díaz-Miguel, basketball player and coach (d. 2000)
- October 21 - Francisco Gento, footballer (d. 2022)

== Deaths ==
=== Date unknown ===
- Rafael Montoro, politician, lawyer, historian, writer, and literary critic (b. 1852)

== See also ==
- List of Spanish films of the 1930s
