= 1939 in Spain =

- Decades: 1910s; 1920s; 1930s; 1940s; 1950s
- See also: History of Spain; Timeline of Spanish history; List of years in Spain

Events from the year 1939 in Spain.

== Incumbents ==
- President: Manuel Azaña until March 3, Francisco Franco as leader
- Prime Minister: Juan Negrín until April 1, Francisco Franco

== Events ==
- January 3 – The news agency EFE, based in Madrid, is officially founded as a limited company.
- January 5-February 4: Battle of Valsequillo
- January 26 - Catalonia Offensive: Nationalist forces capture Barcelona.
- February 7–9 - Battle of Menorca (1939)
- February 10 - Nationalists close Spanish border with France.
- February 16 - the high command of the Republican army tells Negrín that further military resistance was impossible.
- February 27 - United Kingdom and France recognized Francisco Franco's Nationalist government.
- March 4–7 - Cartagena Uprising.
- March 7 - Nationalist transport ship SS Castillo de Olite sunk by Republican shore batteries while entering the port of Cartagena.
- March 5: coup of Segismundo Casado.
- March 5: National Defence Council formed
- March 26-April 1: Final offensive of the Spanish Civil War

== Deaths ==
- March 15 - Luis Barceló (b. 1896)
- November 15 - Etelvino Vega (b. 1906)

== See also ==
- List of Spanish films of the 1930s
- Spanish Civil War
