= 1588 in Spain =

- Decades: 1560s; 1570s; 1580s; 1590s; 1600s
- See also: History of Spain; Timeline of Spanish history; List of years in Spain

Events in the year 1588 in Spain.

== Incumbents ==
- Monarch: Philip II

== Events ==
- April 25 - blessing of the banner of the Spanish Armada
- May 28 - Spanish Armada leaves Lisbon and heads for English Channel
- July 19 - the Spanish Armada is sighted by the English off the coast of Cornwall
- July 21 - The first engagement between the English and Spanish fleets, off Plymouth, results in an English victory. The English fleet is under the command of Lord Howard of Effingham with Sir Francis Drake as Vice Admiral.
- July 23 - The English and Spanish fleets meet again, off Portland; the English again have the better of it.
- July 29 - The English fleet defeats the Armada at the Battle of Gravelines.
- August 2 - The fleeing Spanish fleet sails past the Firth of Forth and the English call off their pursuit. Much of the Spanish fleet will be destroyed by storms as it sails for home around Scotland and Ireland.
- September 23-November 13 - Siege of Bergen op Zoom: Spanish siege defeated by Anglo-Dutch garrison
- October 26 - Conspiracy of the Maharlikas: plot against Spanish colonial rule in the Philippines. Governor-General Santiago de Vera is informed of the plot by Captain Pedro Sarmiento, encomendero of Calamianes. De Vera orders the arrest and execution of the conspirators.

== Deaths ==
- February 9 - Álvaro de Bazán, 1st Marquis of Santa Cruz (born 1526)
