= 1715 in Spain =

- Decades: 1690s; 1700s; 1710s; 1720s; 1730s
- See also: History of Spain; Timeline of Spanish history; List of years in Spain

Events in the year 1715 in Spain.

== Events ==
- June 9 – King Philip, ruler of the Crown of Castile and the Crown of Aragon unifies the two realms into a single state, centralizing rule of a unified Kingdom of Spain.
- July 24 – 1715 Treasure Fleet: A Spanish treasure fleet of 12 ships, under General Don Juan Ubilla, leaves Havana, Cuba for Spain. Seven days later, 11 of them sink in a storm off the coast of Florida (some centuries later, treasure salvage is found from these wrecks).
- Date Unknown - Around this year, a breech loading firearm is made for Philip V of Spain.

== Notable births ==
- February 27 – Mateo Aimerich, Spanish philologist (d. 1799)
- August 25 – Luis González Velázquez, Spanish painter (d. 1763)

== Notable deaths ==
- February 4 – Martín de Ursúa, Spanish conquistador (b. 1653)
