= 2011 in Spanish television =

This is a list of Spanish television related events from 2011.

== Events ==
- 1 April –
  - TV Channel Divinity is launched.
  - TV channel Canal Panda starts rebroadcasting.
- 11 June - Disney Junior starts broadcasting.
- 6 July - Alberto Oliart resigns from Chairman of RTVE.
- 1 September: TV channel Cartoonito starts broadcasting replacing Boomerang.

== Debuts ==
Title	Channel	Debut	Performers/Host	Genre
Bandolera	Antena 3	2011-01-10	Marta Hazas	Soap Opera
Los anuncios de tu vida	La 1	2011-01-13	Manuel Campo Vidal	Variety Show
El barco	Antena 3	2011-01-17	Juanjo Artero, Mario Casas and Blanca Suárez	Drama Series
Sofía	Antena 3	2011-01-19	Nadia de Santiago.	TV-Movie
14 de abril. La República	La 1	2011-01-24	Alejo Sauras and Verónica Sánchez	Drama Series
Equipo de investigación	Antena 3	2011-01-30	Gloria Serra	Investigation
Ángel o demonio	Telecinco	2011-02-01	Aura Garrido y Mar Saura	Drama Series
Atrapa un millón	Antena 3	2011-02-04	Carlos Sobera	Quiz Show
El divo	Paramount comedy	2011-02-11	Agustín Jiménez	Comedy
Hijos de papá	Cuatro	2011-02-18	Luján Argüelles	Reality Show
El secreto de Puente Viejo	Antena 3	2011-02-23	María Bouzas	Soap Opera
Billete a Brasil	Cuatro	2011-02-24	Julian Iantzi	Game Show
El tercero en discorida	Antena 3	2011-03-17	Carlos Sobera	Game Show
Crematorio	Canal+	2011-03-17	José Sancho and Alicia Borrachero	Drama Series
Vida loca	Telecinco	2011-03-13	Toni Cantó, Esther Arroyo, Lolita Flores and Miguel Ángel Muñoz	Sitcom
Gafapastas	La 2	2011-03-14	Juanra Bonet	Quiz Show
La reina del Sur	Antena 3	2011-03-14	Kate del Castillo.	Drama Series
El reencuentro	Telecinco	jul-05 03-17	Jordi González and Christian Gálvez	Reality Show
Mentes en shock	FOX	2011-04-11	Alejandro Tous	Drama Series
Te damos la tarde	13TV	2011-04-11	Nieves Herrero	Variety Show
Tienes 1 minuto	Cuatro	2011-04-11	Luján Argüelles.	Quiz Show
Perdidos en la ciudad	Cuatro	2011-04-24	Nuria Roca.	Reality Show
Los Quién	Antena 3	2011-05-02	Javier Cámara and María Pujalte	Sitcom
BuenAgente	La Sexta	2011-05-05	Arturo Valls, Malena Alterio and Antonio Molero	Sitcom
Con hache de Eva	La Sexta	2011-05-08	Eva Hache	Late Night
Piratas	Telecinco	2011-05-09	Pilar Rubio	Drama Series
Palomitas	Telecinco	2011-05-10	José Corbacho	Comedy
Cocina con Sergio	La 1	2011-06-07	María José Molina	Cooking Show
Involución	Neox	2011-06-08	Berta Collado	Quiz Show
El jefe	Antena 3	2011-08-08		Reality Show
Solo moda	La 2	2011-07-02	Jesús María Montes-Fernández.	Variety Show
Uno para ganar	Cuatro	2011-07-04	Jesús Vázquez	Game Show
No le digas a mamá que trabajo en la tele	Cuatro	2011-07-04	Goyo Jiménez	Comedy
¡Ahora caigo!	Antena 3	2011-07-06	Arturo Valls	Quiz Show
Punta Escarlata	Telecinco	2011-07-20	Carles Francino and Nadia de Santiago	Drama Series
Plaza de España	La 1	2011-07-25	Gorka Otxoa.	Sitcom
Otra movida	Neox	2011-08-08	Florentino Fernández & Anna Simon	Comedy
Al rojo vivo	La Sexta	2011-09-05	Antonio García Ferreras	Talk Show
Tarde Directo	La Sexta	2011-09-05	Cristina Villanueva	Variety Show
Cheers	Telecinco	2011-09-11	Alberto San Juan	Sitcom
+Gente	La 1	2011-09-12	Pilar García Muñiz	Variety Show
La Baronesa	Telecinco	2011-09-13	Mar Regueras and Silvia Tortosa	TV-Movie
Acorralados	Telecinco	2011-09-15	Jorge Javier Vázquez and Raquel Sánchez-Silva	Reality Show
Homicidios	Telecinco	2011-09-15	Eduardo Noriega	Drama Series
Parejología 3x2	Telecinco	2011-09-26	Juanjo Puigcorbé.	Comedy
Tu cara me suena	Antena 3	2011-09-28	Manel Fuentes	Talent Show
Buscamundos	La 2	2011-09-30	Miguel Romero	Travel
Yo de mayor quiero ser español	La 2	2011-10-92	Gomaespuma	Talk Show
Mucho que perder, poco que ganar	La Sexta	2011-10-03	Anabel Alonso	Quiz Show
Gran Hotel	Antena 3	2011-10-04	Amaia Salamanca and Yon González	Drama Series
Juegos en familia	Boing	2011-10-07	Emilio Pineda	Game Show
Frikiliks	Cuatro	2011-10-24	Ana Morgade and David Fernández	Comedy
Salta a la vista	Cuatro	2011-11-07	Jesús Vázquez	Quiz Show
Las noticias de las 2	Cuatro	2011-11-08	Silvia Abril and Ana Morgade	Comedy
El comecocos	Cuatro	2011-11-18	Ruth Jiménez	Quiz Show
Dale al REC	Cuatro	2011-12-19	Ruth Jiménez	Quiz Show
El ángel de Budapest	Antena 3	2011-12-20	Francis Lorenzo	TV-Movie
La selva en casa	Cuatro	2011-12-25	Frank Cuesta	Documentary
Marco	Antena 3	2011-12-26	Mercedes Sampietro	Miniseries
Tarancón, el quinto mandamiento	La 1	2011-12-29	José Sancho	TV-Movie

== Television shows ==
- La 1
  - Telediario (1957- )
  - Informe Semanal (1973- )
  - Parlamento (1978–2014)
  - Los Desayunos de TVE (1994–2020)
  - Cine de barrio (1995- )
  - Corazón (1997- )
  - Cuéntame cómo pasó (2001- )
  - 59 segundos (2004–2012)
  - Destino Eurovisión (2004–2013)
  - España Directo (2005-2022)
  - Amar en tiempos revueltos (2005–2012)
  - Comando actualidad (2008- )
  - Españoles en el mundo (2009 - )
  - La Hora de José Mota (2009–2012)
  - Los misterios de Laura (2009–2014)
  - Águila Roja (2009–2016)
  - La Mañana de La 1 (2009–2020)
  - Gran reserva (2010–2013)
  - Un País para comérselo (2010–2014)
- Antena 3
  - Antena 3 Noticias (1990- )
  - Club Megatrix (1995–2013)
  - Espejo público (1996- )
  - La ruleta de la fortuna (2006- )
  - Curso del 63 (2009–2012)
  - Karlos Arguiñano en tu cocina (2010- )
  - Hispania, la leyenda (2010–2012)
  - Maneras de vivir (2010–2012)
  - Los Protegidos (2010–2012)
  - El Club del Chiste (2010–2013)
- La 2
  - Al filo de lo imposble (1982- )
  - Pueblo de Dios (1982- )
  - Últimas preguntas (1983- )
  - En portada (1984- )
  - Metrópolis (1985- )
  - Documentos TV (1986- )
  - Tendido cero (1986- )
  - Días de cine (1991- )
  - La Aventura del saber (1992- )
  - Jara y sedal (1992- )
  - La 2 noticias (1994–2020)
  - La noche temática, (1995- )
  - Redes (1996–2013)
  - Agrosfera (1997- )
  - El escarabajo verde (1997- )
  - Saber y ganar (1997- )
  - El Cine de La 2 (1998- )
  - Versión española (1998- )
  - Aquí hay trabajo (2000- )
  - España en comunidad (2000–2020)
  - Shalom (2003- )
  - Cámara abierta 2.0 (2007- )
  - Página 2 (2007- )
  - Tres14 (2007–2014)
  - En lengua de signos (2008- )
  - Zoom tendencias ( 2008- )
  - Fábrica de ideas (2008–2017)
  - RTVE responde (2009- )
  - Imprescindibles (2010- )
  - Para todos la Dos (2010- )
  - En La 2 (2010–2012)
  - Mi reino por un caballo (2010–2013)
  - Mitad invisible, La (2010–2016)
- La Sexta
  - El Intermedio (2006- )
  - La Sexta Noticias (2006- )
  - Minuto y resultado (2007–2012)
  - Salvados (2008- )
- Cuatro
  - Cuarto milenio (2005- )
  - Callejeros (2005–2014)
  - Noticias Cuatro (2005–2019)
  - Supernanny (2006–2017)
  - Las mañanas de Cuatro (2006–2018)
  - Desafío extremo (2007–2014)
  - Perdidos en la tribu (2009–2012)
  - Callejeros viajeros (2009–2013)
  - 21 días (2009–2016)
  - Hermano mayor (2009–2017)
  - Granjero busca esposa (2009–2018)
  - Diario de (2010–2014)
  - Malas pulgas (2010–2012)
  - Frank de la jungla (2010–2013)
  - Conexión Samanta (2010–2016)
- Telecinco
  - Informativos Telecinco (1990- )
  - Nosolomúsica (1999–2012)
  - Survivor Spain (2000- )
  - Hospital Central (2000–2012)
  - Big Brother Spain (2000–2017)
  - Gran Hermano VIP (2004–2019)
  - El Programa de Ana Rosa (2005- )
  - Aída (2005–2014)
  - Pasapalabra (2007–2019)
  - Survivor Spain (2006- )
  - La que se avecina (2007- )
  - La Noria (2007–2012)
  - Pasapalabra (2007–2019)
  - Tú sí que vales (2008–2013)
  - I love TV (2008–2015)
  - Mujeres y Hombres y Viceversa (2008–2018)
  - Sálvame (2009- )
  - Deluxe (2009- )
  - Vuélveme loca (2009–2012)
  - De buena ley (2009–2014)
  - ¡Qué tiempo tan feliz! (2009–2017)

== Ending this year ==
- La 1
  - Gente (1995-2011)
  - Tengo una pregunta para usted (2007-2011)
- La 2
  - Palabra por palabra (2005-2011)
- Telecinco
  - Hormigas blancas (2007-2011)
  - La pecera de Eva (2010-2011)
  - Diario de (2004-2011)
- Antena 3
  - ¿Dónde estás, corazón? (2003-2011)
  - 3D3 (2010-2011)
  - Gavilanes (2010-2011)
  - Impares Premium (2010-2011)
  - Informe 3 (2010-2011)
  - El Diario (2008-2011)
  - Física o Química (2008-2011)
  - Doctor Mateo (2009-2011)
  - Rico al instante (2009-2011)
- Cuatro
  - Fama, ¡a bailar! (2008-2011)
  - Dame una pista (2010 – 2011)
  - Tonterías las justas (2010 – 2011)
- La Sexta
  - Sé lo que hicisteis...(2006-2011)
  - Buenafuente (2005-2011)
  - ¿Quién vive ahí? (2010-2011)
  - Algo pasa con Marta (2010-2011)

== Changes of network affiliation ==
Show	Moved From	Moved To
Bricomanía (1994-2020)	Antena 3	Nova
El club de la comedia (1999-2017)	Antena 3	La Sexta
Decogarden (2001-2020)	Antena 3	Nova
El Hormiguero (2006- )	Cuatro	Antena 3
Deal or No Deal (2004-2011)	Telecinco	Cuatro

== Deaths ==
- 10 January - Juanito Navarro, 86, actor.
- 27 January - Paco Maestre, 53, actor.
- 19 February - Florinda Chico, 84, actress.
- 22 February - Chari Gómez Miranda, 81, hostess.
- 25 February - José Conde, 56, actor.
- 13 March - Andrés Resino, 70, actor.
- 9 April - Isabel Osca, 79, actress.
- 25 April - María Isbert, 94, actress.
- 4 September - Carlos Ballesteros, 75, actor.
- 16 September - Jordi Dauder, 73, actor.
- 17 December - Lorenzo de Rodas, 71, actor.

== See also ==
- 2011 in Spain
- List of Spanish films of 2011
