= 1823 in Spain =

- Decades: 1800s; 1810s; 1820s; 1830s; 1840s
- See also: History of Spain; Timeline of Spanish history; List of years in Spain

Events in the year 1823 in Spain.

== Incumbents ==
- King: Ferdinand VII
- Prime Minister: Víctor Damián Sáez (starting 19 November)

== Events ==
- January 23 - secret treaty signed at Verona, Italy, allowing French intervention in Spain to restore Ferdinand VII to absolute rule
- January 28 - King Louis XVIII of France announces creation of the Hundred Thousand Sons of Saint Louis
- February - French legislature, controlled by Ultra-Royalists vote to support the intervention
- April 6 - French cross the river Bidasoa on the Franco-Spanish border
- April 7 - French troops enter Spain mostly unopposed
- May 24 - French Troops take Madrid
- August 31 - Spanish liberal revolutionaries suffer a major defeat against the French at the Battle of Trocadero
- September 23 - Cadiz falls to the French, ending the liberal revolution and restoring Ferdinand VII to the throne

== Deaths ==
- November 7 - Rafael del Riego, liberal politician, general and revolutionary; executed by Ferdinand VII for leading the liberal revolution against him (b. 1784)
