= 1879 in Spain =

- Decades: 1850s; 1860s; 1870s; 1880s; 1890s
- See also: History of Spain; Timeline of Spanish history; List of years in Spain

Events in the year 1879 in Spain.

== Incumbents ==
- Monarch: Alfonso XII
- Prime Minister: Antonio Cánovas del Castillo

== Events ==
- April 20 - Spanish general election, 1879

== Births ==
- February 20 - Pedro Muñoz Seca
- August 14 - Marcelino Valentín Gamazo
- November 14 - Antonio Escobar Huertas

== Deaths ==
- Juan de Zavala, 1st Marquis of Sierra Bullones
