= 1881 in Spain =

- Decades: 1860s; 1870s; 1880s; 1890s; 1900s
- See also: History of Spain; Timeline of Spanish history; List of years in Spain

Events in the year 1881 in Spain.

== Incumbents ==
- Monarch: Alfonso XII
- Prime Minister: Antonio Canovas del Castillo (until 10 February), Práxedes Mateo Sagasta (starting 10 February)

== Events ==
- Spanish general election, 1881

== Births ==
- October 25 - Pablo Picasso, painter (d. 1973 in France)
