= 2005 in Spain =

- Decades: 1980s; 1990s; 2000s; 2010s; 2020s
- See also: History of Spain; Timeline of Spanish history; List of years in Spain

Events in the year 2005 in Spain.

== Incumbents ==
- Monarch: Juan Carlos I
- Prime Minister: José Luis Rodríguez Zapatero

== Births ==
- 5 June: Irene Urdangarín y de Borbón, daughter of Infanta Cristina of Spain and Iñaki Urdangarín
- 31 October: Infanta Leonor of Spain, daughter of Felipe, Prince of Asturias and Letizia, Princess of Asturias

== Deaths ==
- 5 October – Álvaro Domecq y Díez, 88, aristocrat
- 4 December: Gloria Lasso, 83, singer
- 15 December: Julián Marías, 91, philosopher and father of author Javier Marías

== See also ==
- 2005 in Spanish television
- List of Spanish films of 2005
