= 1580 in Spain =

- Decades: 1560s; 1570s; 1580s; 1590s; 1600s
- See also: Other events of 1580; List of years in Spain

Events in the year 1580 in Spain.

== Incumbents ==
- Monarch: Philip II

== Births ==
- June 26 - Gaspar de Borja y Velasco (died 1645)
- September 14 – Francisco de Quevedo, nobleman, politician and writer (died 1645)
