= 1868 in Spain =

- Decades: 1840s; 1850s; 1860s; 1870s; 1880s
- See also: History of Spain; Timeline of Spanish history; List of years in Spain

Events in the year 1868 in Spain.

== Incumbents ==
- Monarch - Isabella II until September 30
- Prime Minister:
  - until 23 April: Ramon Maria Narvaez
  - 23 April–19 September: Luis González Bravo
  - 19 September–30 September: Jose Gutierrez de la Concha
  - 30 September–3 October: Pascual Madoz
  - starting 3 October: Francisco Serrano

== Events ==
- September 19–27 - Glorious Revolution (Spain)

== Deaths ==
- April 23 - Ramón María Narváez, 1st Duke of Valencia
