= 1693 in Spain =

- Decades: 1670s; 1680s; 1690s; 1700s; 1710s
- See also: History of Spain; Timeline of Spanish history; List of years in Spain

Events in the year 1693 in Spain.

== Incumbents ==
- Monarch: Charles II

== Events ==
- Founding of the Real Academia de Medicina y Cirugía de Sevilla (Royal Academy of Medicine and Surgery of Seville)
