= 1827 in Spain =

- Decades: 1800s; 1810s; 1820s; 1830s; 1840s
- See also: History of Spain; Timeline of Spanish history; List of years in Spain

Events from the year 1827 in Spain

== Incumbents ==
- Monarch – Ferdinand VII
- Prime Minister: Manuel González Salmón

== Events ==
- War of the Aggrieved (Guerra de los Agraviados) – an ultra-absolutist uprising takes place between March and October, primarily in Catalonia and to a lesser extent in Valencia, Aragon, the Basque Country, and Andalusia. The insurgents, numbering between 20,000 and 30,000 men, rebel against the government of Ferdinand VII, which they accuse of being too liberal.
- March – The first rebel parties under Colonel Trillas and Captain Salvador Llovet are formed in Terres de l'Ebre. They fail in their attempt to seize Tortosa on 12 March and are quickly defeated; both are shot at the beginning of April.
- 1 April – Narcís Abrés revolts near Girona, spreading the rebellion throughout northern Catalonia.
- 25 August – Agustín Saperes ("El Caragol") pronounces himself with a manifesto proclaiming the War of the Aggrieved, demanding the return of the Inquisition and other ultra-realist measures.
- 28 August – The rebels establish the Junta Suprema Provisional de Gobierno del Principado de Cataluña in Manresa, presided over by Agustín Saperes.
- By mid-September – The insurgents occupy most of the interior of Catalonia, including Vic, Cervera, Valls, Reus, Talarn, and Puigcerdà, and lay siege to Tarragona and Girona.
- 14 September – The Count of Spain is appointed Captain General of Catalonia, replacing the Marquis of Campo Sagrado.
- 28 September – Ferdinand VII arrives in Tarragona and publishes a manifesto from the Archbishop's Palace, calling on the rebels to lay down their arms.
- October – Following the king's personal intervention, Manresa surrenders on 8 October without resistance, followed by Cervera, Vic, and Olot. Despite promises of amnesty, Ferdinand VII has nine rebel leaders executed in Tarragona and approximately 300 insurgents deported to Ceuta.
- The French Army that had been stationed in Spain since 1823 withdraws from the country.
- In exile, José María de Torrijos y Uriarte and Manuel Flores Calderón form the Liberal Board in London, with Torrijos as military chief.

== Deaths ==
- 27 April – Joaquín Blake, military general, commander of the Army of Galicia during the Peninsular War (born 1759)
- 26 November – José Álvarez Cubero, sculptor, court sculptor to Ferdinand VII (born 1768)
- 12 December – María Pascuala Caro Sureda, scholar (born 1768)
