= 1724 in Spain =

- Decades: 1700s; 1710s; 1720s; 1730s; 1740s
- See also: History of Spain; Timeline of Spanish history; List of years in Spain

Events in the year 1724 in Spain.

== Incumbents ==
- King: Philip V until his abdication on January 15, Louis I until his death on August 31, and Philip V again.
- First Secretary of State - José de Grimaldo until January 14, Juan Bautista until September 4, José de Grimaldo from September 4

== Deaths ==
- August 31 - Louis I of Spain (b. 1707)
