= 1937 in Spain =

- Decades: 1910s; 1920s; 1930s; 1940s; 1950s
- See also: History of Spain; Timeline of Spanish history; List of years in Spain

Events from the year 1937 in Spain.

== Incumbents ==
- President: Manuel Azaña
- Prime Minister: Francisco Largo Caballero until May 17, Juan Negrín

== Events ==
- February 6–27 - Battle of Jarama
- March 5 - Battle of Cape Machichaco
- March 6-April 16 - Battle of Pozoblanco
- March 8–23 - Battle of Guadalajara
- March 31-October 21 - War in the North
- March 31-July 1 - Biscay Campaign
- March 31 - Battle of Guadarrama
- March 31 - Bombing of Durango
- April 1 - Bombing of Jaén
- April 26 - Bombing of Guernica
- May 3–8 - Barcelona May Days
- May 29 - Deutschland incident (1937)
- May 31 - Bombardment of Almería
- May 31-June 6 - Segovia Offensive
- June 12–19 - Huesca Offensive
- June 12–19 - Battle of Bilbao
- July 5-August 11 - Battle of Albarracín
- July 6–25 - Battle of Brunete
- August 14-September 17 - Battle of Santander
- August 24-September 7 - Zaragoza Offensive
- August 24-September 7 - Battle of Belchite (1937)

== Births ==
- February 26 – Eduardo Arroyo, Spanish painter and graphic artist (d. 2018)
- May 4 – Marisa Robles, Spanish harpist
- May 9 – Rafael Moneo, Spanish architect
- August 3 – Andrés Gimeno, Spanish tennis player (d. 2019)
- December 6 – Ramon Torrents, Spanish artist

== Deaths ==
- January 18 - Jaime Hilario Barbal (born 1898)
- June 3 - Emilio Mola, One of the three leaders of the Spanish civil war. (born 1887)
- June 20 - Andrés Nin (born 1892)
- 26 July — Gerda Taro, Polish-German war photographer (born 1910)

== See also ==
- List of Spanish films of the 1930s
