= Juan Ramón Lacadena =

Spanish agronomical engineer

Juan Ramón Lacadena Calero (born 14 November 1934) is a Spanish agronomical engineer.

Lacadena was born at Zaragoza. He studied in the Escuela Especial de Ingenieros Agrónomos in Madrid. He has been collaborator in CSIC, professor of Genetics in the UCM, head of the Department of Genetics in the Universidad de La Laguna (1971) and in the UCM (1971–2005).

He collaborated in the Sociedad Española de Genética (Secretary, 1973–1985; President, 1985–1990).

He has made more than 100 papers and scientific monographs about chromosomal behaviour in cytogenetics and more than 80 publications about genetics and bioethics. He was a member in the Comisión Nacional de Reproducción Humana Asistida (1997) and in the International Society of Bioethics (1997).

== Partial bibliography ==
- Genética Vegetal. Fundamentos de su Aplicación (1970)
- Genética (4ªed. 1988)
- Problemas de Genética para un Curso General (1988)
- Citogenética (1996)
- Genética: Conceptos fundamentales (1999)
- Genética y condición humana (1983)
- La Genética: Una narrativa histórico-conceptual (1986)
- Fe y Biología (2001)
- Genética y Bioética (2002).
