= Santiago Artigas =

Spanish actor

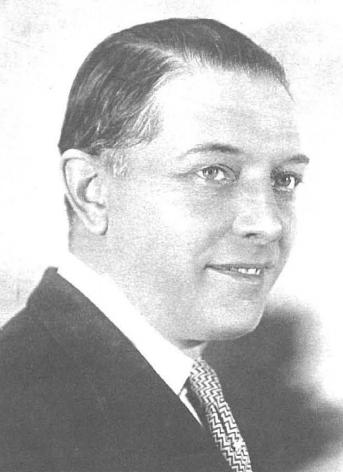
Santiago Artigas

Santiago Artigas or Santiago Artigas Andreu (May 21, 1881 – October 9, 1931) was a Spanish actor.
