= Ciberobn =

Research consortium in Spain

The Spanish Biomedical Research Centre in Physiopathology of Obesity and Nutrition (Centro de Investigación Biomédica en Red de Fisiopatología de la Obesidad y Nutrición: CIBERObn) is a public research consortium which was founded on November 28, 2006 financed by the Instituto de Salud Carlos III (ISCIII) and the Ministerio de Ciencia e Innovación (MICINN).

The CIBERObn gathers 31 investigation groups from different Spanish Hospitals, Universities and Research Centres. Its mission is to promote a better knowledge about the mechanisms contributing to obesity development in order to reduce its incidence and prevalence, as well as its complications, in addition to nutrition-related diseases.

The CIBERObn is structured into 8 scientific programs intended to increase the collaboration between researchers, to strengthen synergies and to boost new research lines. Programs are as follows:

1. Nutrition: effects of different types of diet and nutrients on human health.
2. Adipobiology: identification of new signals released by the adipose tissue which are involved in the regulation of energy homeostasis.
3. Obesity and Cancer: role of those proteins associated with cell cycle on metabolic control and obesity development.
4. Obesity and Cardiovascular risk: hemodynamic, metabolic and inflammatory factors associated to cardiac and vascular diseases in obesity.
5. Neurocognitive and Environmental Factors: environmental and emotional factors in nutrition and obesity disorders.
6. Obesity in Childhood-Adolescence Period: biochemical, hormonal, metabolic, genetic, proteomic and body-composition study in children and adolescents.
7. Biomarkers: new strategies, therapeutic and prevention technologies, biomarkers of obesity.
8. Biological Models and Therapeutic Targets: development and validation of experimental models and therapeutic targets in case of obesity.

Additionally, CIBERObn lays a particular emphasis on translational research, specially focusing on research transfer to clinical applications and practices. To this end, two cross-cutting programs have been created:

- Staff Training and Recruitment, which is intended to train our staff according to our research lines and priorities
- “Fat Bank” Structural Program: biobank infrastructure connecting the above-mentioned programs in a cross way by contributing with common solutions.

The Fat Bank is a strategic platform of the CIBERObn which offers the Scientific Community different kinds of biological material which are associated to thorough metabolic phenotyping. This information is entered by means of a tailor-made individualised software. This fat-bank- launched in 2009- currently contains 3000 samples of biologic material from more than 300 individuals.

In 2009, 287 indexed articles were published. Their average impact factor is 4.05, which is very high for this subject area. Of them, 67 (23%) belong to the first decile and 105 more (total 172 papers, 60%) belong to the first quartile of the subject area of indexed journals. They accumulate a total impact factor of 1,165. Provisional data of 2010 show an increase of 10%, highly improving the international visibility of the consortium.
