= Radio Ourense =

The Grupo Radio Ourense is a network of radio stations in Spain. The enterprise began in 1932 with a 100-watt transmitter in Ourense, set up by Ramón Puga Noguerol. Noguerol utilized the radio station primarily to promote the record albums for sale in his commercial store. It was more of a hobby than a business.

But, three years later in 1935, the station was granted a formal license, EAJ-57, and the business became more serious. In 1966, the station became a part of a wider commercial association, La Voz del Miño. Pedro Arcas succeeded Ramón Puga at the helm.
