= Ricardo Bueno Fernández =

Spanish politician and historian

Ricardo Bueno Fernández (24 April 1940 – 7 January 2015) was a Spanish politician and historian. He was member of the Senate of Spain for the Union of the Democratic Centre between 1977 and 1979. As member of the People's Party he served two terms in the Senate between 1993 and 2000, and one term in the Congress of Deputies between 2000 and 2004.

== Career ==
Bueno was born in Medina del Campo on 24 April 1940. He worked as an administrative clerk for most of his life. In the 1977 general elections he was elected to the Senate of the Constituent Assembly for Cantabria on the list of the Union of the Democratic Centre. He received 103,000 votes, the most of all elected Senators in Cantabria. In 1979 his term in office ended. Between 1993 and 2000 he served two further terms in the Senate, this time for the People's Party. He was member of the Congress of Deputies for the same party between 2000 and 2004.

Bueno had moved to Torrelavega in Cantabria as a child. As an historian Bueno took a particular interest in the city, collecting information on it and working together with others on the book Torrelevega 1900. He served in the municipal council of the city between 1991 and 1999.

He died on 7 January 2015 of cancer.
