= 942 Dakar, historia de una familia =

2008 Spanish documentary film

- Directed by: Ojocítrico: Adolfo Ramírez, Fermín Lizarraga, Diego del Barrio
- Screenplay by: Ojocítrico
- Produced by: Ojocítrico Producciones
- Starring: Familia Sow, Familia Mbaye
- Cinematography: Diego Martín Verdugo
- Edited by: Ojocítrico, Irlanda Tambaschio, Marta Salas
- Music by: Jonás Gimeno, Bamba Sow
- Release date: 2008
- Running time: 55 minutes
- Country: Spain

942 Dakar, historia de una familia is a Spanish 2008 documentary film.

== Synopsis ==
Bamba, a Senegalese man residing in Zaragoza, Spain, goes back to Dakar, Senegal to spend some time with his family. Who are they? What worries them and how do they deal with their loved ones' absence?
