= Acción obrera =

Acción obrera ('Workers Action') was a weekly socialist newspaper published from Ceuta, Spain. It was likely launched in early 1931. As of 1933, it was still being published.
