= José Antonio Souto =

Spanish jurist, academic, and politician

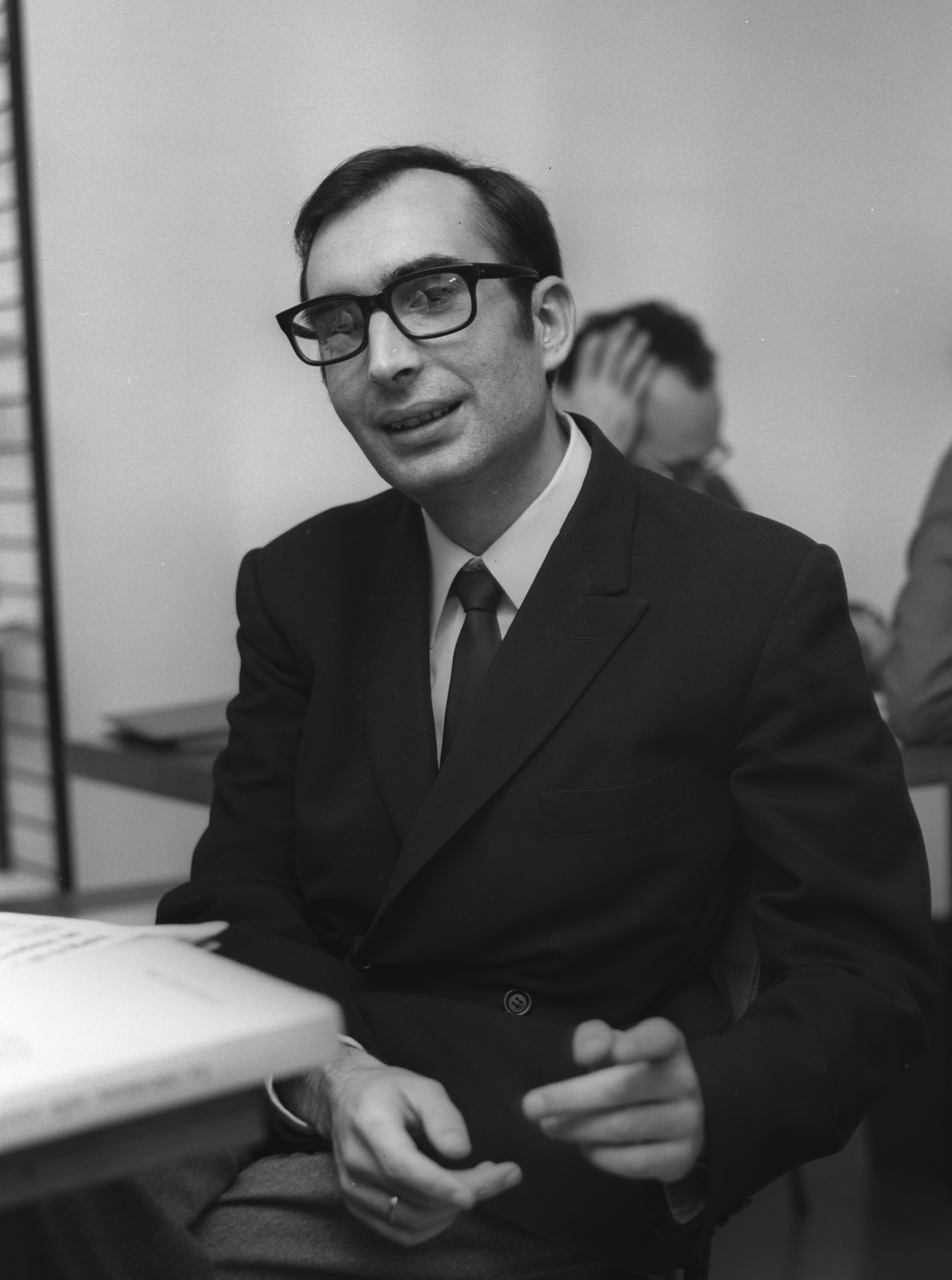
José Antonio Souto

José Antonio Souto Paz (9 October 1938 – 8 September 2017) was a Spanish jurist, academic and politician who served as the first democratic Mayor of Santiago de Compostela from 1979 to 1981 following Spain's transition to democracy.

A jurist by profession, Souto also served as the dean of the Faculty of Law at the University of Santiago de Compostela. He later served as a deputy in the national Congress of Deputies, representing the Province of A Coruña, from 1989 until 1993, as well as an advisor of the regional ombudsman.

José Antonio Souto died in Madrid on 8 September 2017 at the age of 78.
