= Rafael Lomana =

Spanish politician (born 1965)

Rafael Lomana MP

Member of the Congress of Deputies
- In office 21 May 2019 – 29 May 2023
- Constituency: Albacete

Personal details
- Born: 5 September 1965 (age 60) Santander, Spanish State
- Party: Vox

Rafael Lomana (born 5 September 1965) is a Spanish politician and former professional skier and television presenter.

== Biography ==
Lomana was born in 1965 in Santander and grew up in León. He is the younger brother of media personality Carmen Lomana. He began practicing extreme sports at a young age and became a skiing instructor at the Sierra Nevada.

== Media career ==
Lomana worked as a presenter on a number of sports channels, including Extreme Challenge with mountaineer Jesús Calleja in 2010 and Be The Best on Be Mad TV since 2016.

== Politics ==
In March 2019, Lomama announced he had joined the Vox with the intention of running as a candidate in the next general election. In the April 2019 elections he was elected to the Congress of Deputies for Vox representing the Albacete constituency.
