= Inmaculada Cruz =

Spanish politician (1960–2013)

- Born: María Inmaculada Cruz Salcedo; 8 December 1960; Cuenca, Spain
- Died: 4 August 2013 (aged 52)
- Occupation: Politician
- Political party: Spanish Socialist Workers' Party

María Inmaculada Cruz Salcedo (8 December 1960 – 4 August 2013) was a Spanish politician and teacher affiliated to the Spanish Socialist Workers' Party. She was elected as member of the Senate of Spain in 2011 representing Cuenca. She died on 4 August 2013 after a long battle with cancer.
