= Mauro Galindo =

Spanish dancer and choreographer

Mauro Galindo (1958 – May 9, 2007) was a Spanish dancer and choreographer and instructor of Spanish dance.

== Early life ==
Galindo was born in 1958 in Gavà.

== Education ==
Galindo received his BA in Art History and Classical Dance in Switzerland and at the Academia Princesse Grace in Monte Carlo.

== Career ==
Galindo trained with Jean Martinelli in Switzerland and at the Academia Princesse Grace (Princess Grace Academy) in Monte Carlo. His professional career as a dancer began at the National Classical Ballet with Víctor Ullate, the Stuttgart Ballet under the direction of dancer Marcia Haydée, and the Zurich Ballet with Uwe Scholz. He was a professor at the Instituto de Teatro de Barcelona (Theatre Institute of Barcelona) since 1987 and worked at the choreographic center of the Teatres de la Generalitat Valenciana as the head of Ballet.

He was one of the promoters, together with María de Ávila, and director of the now defunct Ballet de Zaragoza from its creation in 1989 until 1996, when Arantxa Argüelles replaced him.

Among his qualities, Galindo stood out for his professionalism, dedication, and generosity to his professional colleagues.
