= Francisco Rodríguez Pascual =

Spanish anthropologist (1927–2007)

Francisco Rodríguez Pascual (20 March 1927 – 22 April 2007) was a Spanish humanist and anthropologist. He was considered a pioneer in the field of ethnography. His most well known work is the critically acclaimed Dios Nuestro Señor.
