= José Manuel Puelles de los Santos =

Spanish physician

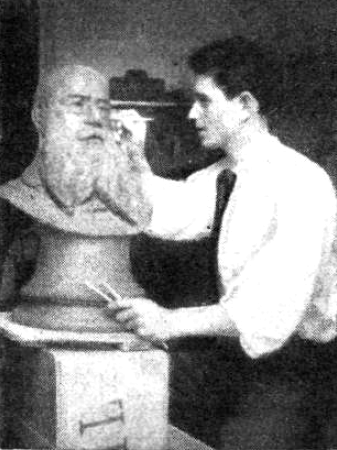
José Manuel Puelles de los Santos

José Manuel Puelles de los Santos (January 16, 1894 – August 5, 1936) was a Spanish physician. He served as president of the Provincial Council of Seville and was killed by the military coup against the Second Spanish Republic.
