= 1893 in Spain =

- Decades: 1870s; 1880s; 1890s; 1900s; 1910s
- See also: History of Spain; Timeline of Spanish history; List of years in Spain

Events in the year 1893 in Spain.

== Incumbents ==
- Monarch: Alfonso XIII
- Prime Minister: Práxedes Mateo Sagasta

== Events ==
- January 31– Historical American Exposition closes in Madrid
- March 5 - Spanish general election, 1893

== Births ==
- May 6 - José Calvo Sotelo

== Deaths ==
- Concepción Arenal, feminist writer and activist (born 1820)
