= Marcelino Valentín Gamazo =

Spanish lawyer (1879–1936)

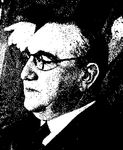

Marcelino Valentín Gamazo (14 August 1879 – 6 August 1936) was a Spanish lawyer, Secretary of the Bar Association of Madrid on three occasions, Dean of the State lawyers and Prosecutor General of the Republic, serving from November to December 1935. He was born in Rubielos Altos on 14 August 1879 and died in El Cerrajón on 6 August 1936. He tried unsuccessfully to condemn the socialist leader, Francisco Largo Caballero, as head of the 1934 Revolution. He was murdered at the beginning of the Civil War. He was murdered by militias of the PSOE after they murdered his three sons in front of him.

== Career ==
Gamazo was appointed by Niceto Alcalá Zamora as Prosecutor General of the Republic on Saturday 16 November 1935, proposed by the Ministry of Justice. He took office on Tuesday 19 November.

His most notable case was the charge undertaken by the Supreme Court against the socialist leader Francisco Largo Caballero, charging him with heading the 1934 Revolution, and accusing him of military rebellion, a crime punishable with thirty years' imprisonment. Largo Caballero having been acquitted, Gamazo tendered his resignation on Wednesday 18 December of that year, which was accepted on the 24th.

He was arrested and beaten by a Popular Front militia group on 5 August 1936 and killed that night with three of his sons, also lawyers: Jose Antonio, Javier and Luis, 21, 20 and 17 years respectively.

A devout Christian, he was a member of the Catholic Action and of the Knights of the Pilar, and participated in the reorganization of the Congregation of St. Ivo, the patron saint of lawyers.

== Marriage and children ==
Gamazo married Narcisa Fernández y Navarro de los Paños, with whom he had nine children: María de las Mercedes, José Antonio, Francisco Javier, Luis Gonzaga, Emilia, Fernando María, Alfonso, Maria Teresa and Maria Julia.

Preceded by Lorenzo Gallardo González	Prosecutor General of the Republic; 1935	Succeeded by Antonio Taboada Tundidor
