= José Ramón Bauzá =

Spanish Politician, President of the Government of the Balearic Islands from 2011 to 2015

José Ramón Bauzá MEP
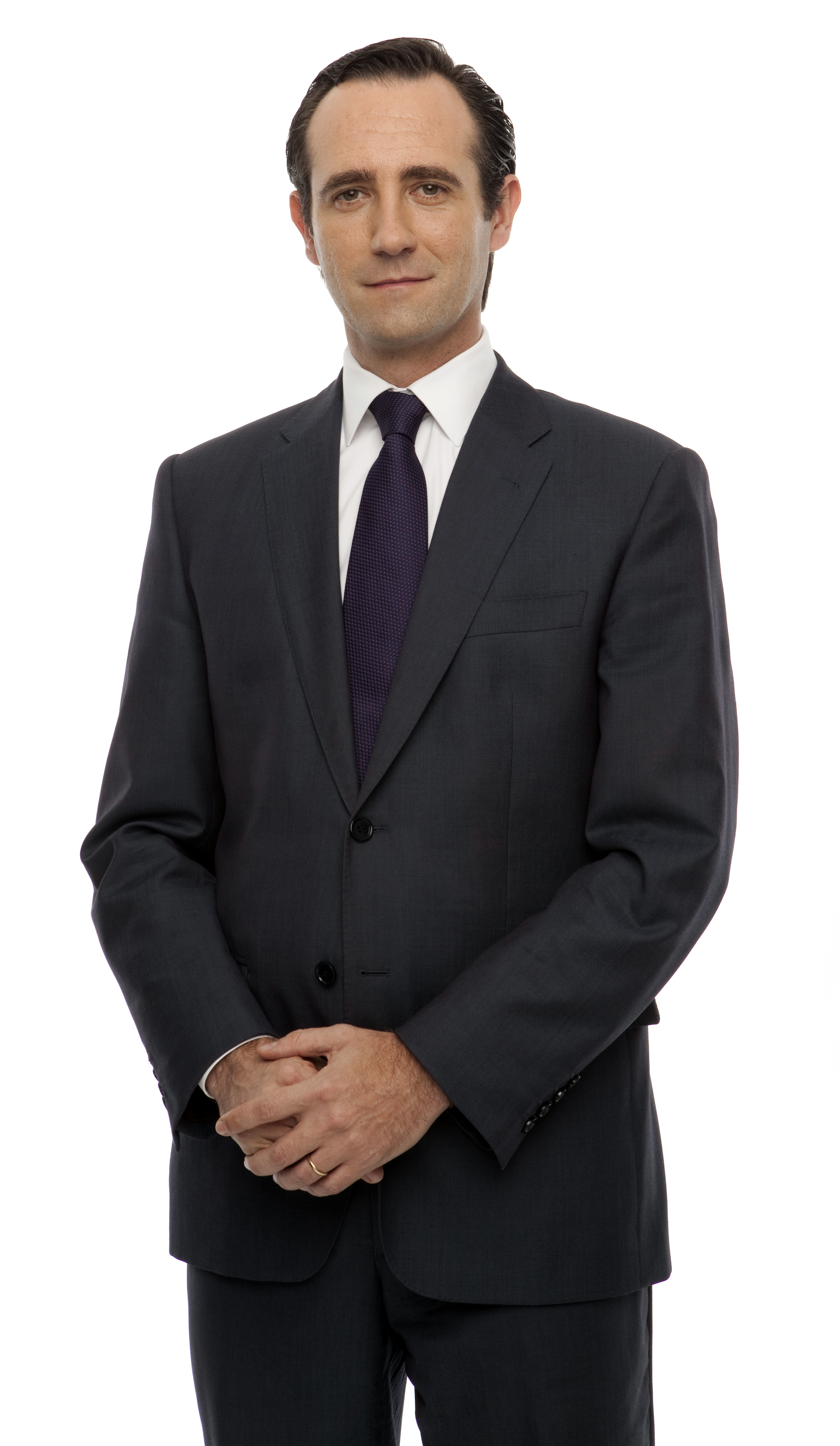

Member of the European Parliament for Spain
- In office 2 July 2019 – 15 July 2024

Spanish Senator designated by the Parliament of the Balearic Islands
- In office 9 July 2015 – 23 January 2019

President of the Government of the Balearic Islands
- In office 18 June 2011 – 2 July 2015
- Monarchs: Juan Carlos I Felipe VI
- Preceded by: Francesc Antich
- Succeeded by: Francina Armengol

Member of the Parliament of the Balearic Islands
- In office 18 June 2015 – 8 July 2015
- In office 7 June 2011 – 31 March 2015
- In office 8 February 2011 – 29 March 2011
- Constituency: Mallorca

President of the People's Party of the Balearic Islands
- In office 11 September 2009 – 23 July 2015
- Preceded by: Rosa Estaràs
- Succeeded by: Miquel Vidal

Mayor of Marratxí
- In office 11 June 2005 – 11 June 2011
- Preceded by: Miquel Bestard
- Succeeded by: Tomeu Oliver

Personal details
- Born: José Ramón Bauzá Díaz; 16 November 1970 (age 55) Madrid, Spain
- Party: People's Party (1996–2019); Citizens (since 2019)

José Ramón Bauzá Díaz (born 16 November 1970) is a Spanish pharmacist and politician who served as President of the Government of the Balearic Islands from 2011 to 2015, following the People's Party's victory by an absolute majority in the 2011 Balearic regional election.

He previously served as Mayor of Marratxí from 2005 to 2011 and as President of the People's Party of the Balearic Islands from 2009 to 2015.

Following his regional premiership, Bauzá was appointed to the Senate of Spain by the Parliament of the Balearic Islands, serving from 2015 to 2019. After leaving the People's Party in 2019, he joined Citizens and was elected to the European Parliament in the 2019 European election, where he served as a member of the Renew Europe group until the end of the parliamentary term in 2024.

== Political career ==
=== Municipal politics (1996–2011) ===
Bauzá joined the People's Party in 1996 and began his political career in Marratxí, Mallorca. He served as a municipal councillor before becoming First Deputy Mayor.

Following a coalition agreement between the People's Party and Independents of Marratxí (IxM), Bauzá became mayor of Marratxí in June 2005. He was re-elected in the 2007 municipal elections, when the People's Party won an absolute majority in the municipal council.

In 2008, Bauzá became Executive Vice-President of the People's Party of the Balearic Islands. After Rosa Estaràs resigned as party leader in September 2009, he was elected President of the People's Party of the Balearic Islands.

At the May 2011 Balearic regional election, the People's Party won 35 of the 59 seats in the Parliament of the Balearic Islands, securing an absolute majority.

=== President of the Balearic Islands (2011–2015) ===
Following the People's Party's victory by an absolute majority in the 2011 Balearic regional election, Bauzá was elected President of the Government of the Balearic Islands by the Parliament of the Balearic Islands. He took office on 18 June 2011.

Bauzá's government reorganised the structure of the regional administration following its formation in 2011, reducing the number of senior government posts and introducing a broader administrative restructuring. It also introduced the Integrated Language Treatment (TIL), an education programme using Catalan, Spanish and English as languages of instruction in non-university education.

Following the 2015 Balearic regional election, the People's Party lost its absolute majority. Bauzá left office after Francina Armengol was elected President of the Government of the Balearic Islands.

== Controversy ==
According to Politico Europe, Bauzá did not disclose that he held shares in the startup Gas2Move when he joined the European Parliament in 2019.

In 2023, Bauzá was investigated by parliamentary authorities over allegations of workplace harassment.
