= José Antonio Monago =

Spanish politician

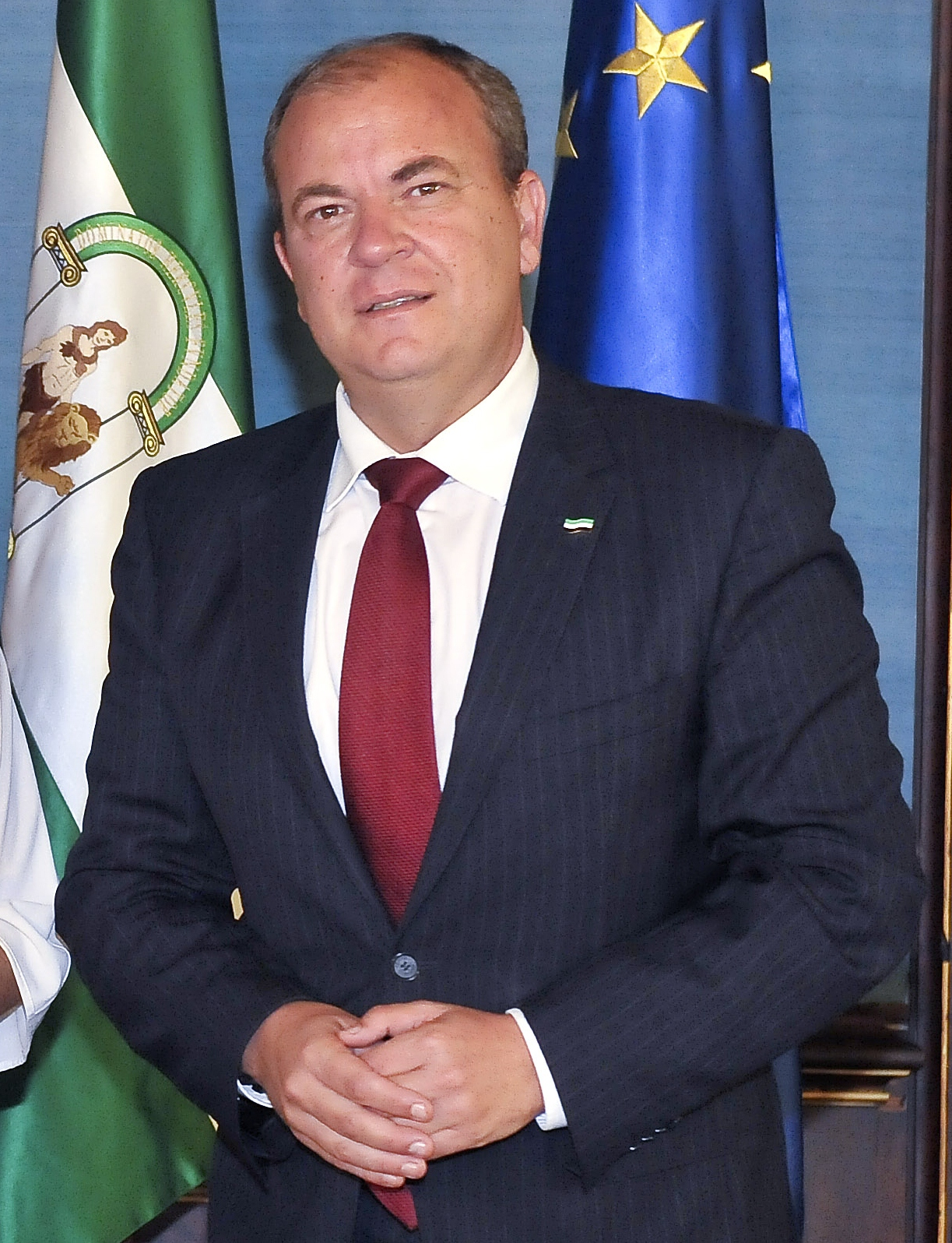

President of the Regional Government of Extremadura
- In office 8 July 2011 – 4 July 2015
- Monarchs: Juan Carlos I Felipe VI
- Preceded by: Guillermo Fernández Vara
- Succeeded by: Guillermo Fernández Vara

President of the People's Party in Extremadura
- In office 8 November 2008 – 16 July 2022
- Preceded by: Carlos Floriano
- Succeeded by: María Guardiola

Member of the Senate
- Incumbent
- Assumed office 17 August 2023
- Constituency: Badajoz
- In office 19 Juli 2019 – 17 August 2023
- Constituency: Assembly of Extremadura
- In office 3 April 2008 – 7 July 2011
- Constituency: Assembly of Extremadura

Member of the Assembly of Extremadura
- In office 25 May 2003 – 31 August 2023
- Constituency: Badajoz

Member of the Badajoz City Council
- In office 4 July 1991 – 8 November 2008

Personal details
- Born: 10 January 1966 (age 60) Quintana de la Serena, Extremadura, Spain
- Party: PP
- Education: University of Salamanca

José Antonio Monago Terraza (born 10 January 1966) is a Spanish politician who belongs to the People's Party (PP) who served as President of the Regional Government of Extremadura, the Extremaduran regional administration, from 2011 to 2015. Outside of political life, Monago received a Doctorate in Law from the University of Salamanca He became Extremaduran regional leader of the PP in 2007 and served as a city councillor in Badajoz and as a PP deputy in the Extremaduran Assembly. The Extremaduran Assembly appointed him to the Spanish Senate in 2008.

== Biography ==
Monago was chosen as the PP candidate for President of the Regional Government of Extremadura in the 2011 Extremaduran elections. The elections saw the PP emerge as the largest party in Extremadura for the first time, although they fell one seat short of an absolute majority. The outgoing President, Guillermo Fernández Vara of the PSOE, attempted to secure re-election by forming a pact with United Left (IU). However IU declined to support the PSOE and abstained in the Presidential vote with the result that Monago became the first PP President of the Regional Government of Extremadura. Nine months later, Monago's minority government is threatened to collapse after the IU agreed to re-negotiate with PSOE after parliamentary elections in Andalusia and Asturias on 25 March 2012.

In November 2014, it was leaked that Monago could have used public money of the Senate in 2009 and 2010 to make 32 visits to his then girlfriend in the Canary Islands He promised to give the money back, but he later took that promise back.

This issue reached the Supreme Court, which closed the matter because the journalistic information was not credited. "The complaint was inadmissible for not being the facts constituting any criminal offense". Currently, José Antonio Monago is Chairman of the Senate Budget Committee.

He was elected to the 15th Senate of Spain representing Badajoz in the 2023 Spanish general election.

Political offices
Preceded by Guillermo Fernández Vara	President of the Regional Government of Extremadura; 2011-2015	Succeeded by Guillermo Fernández Vara
Party political offices
Preceded by Carlos Floriano	President of the People's Party in Extremadura; 2008–2022	Succeeded by María Guardiola
