= Ramón Luis Valcárcel =

Spanish politician (born 1954)

Ramón Luis Valcárcel MEP
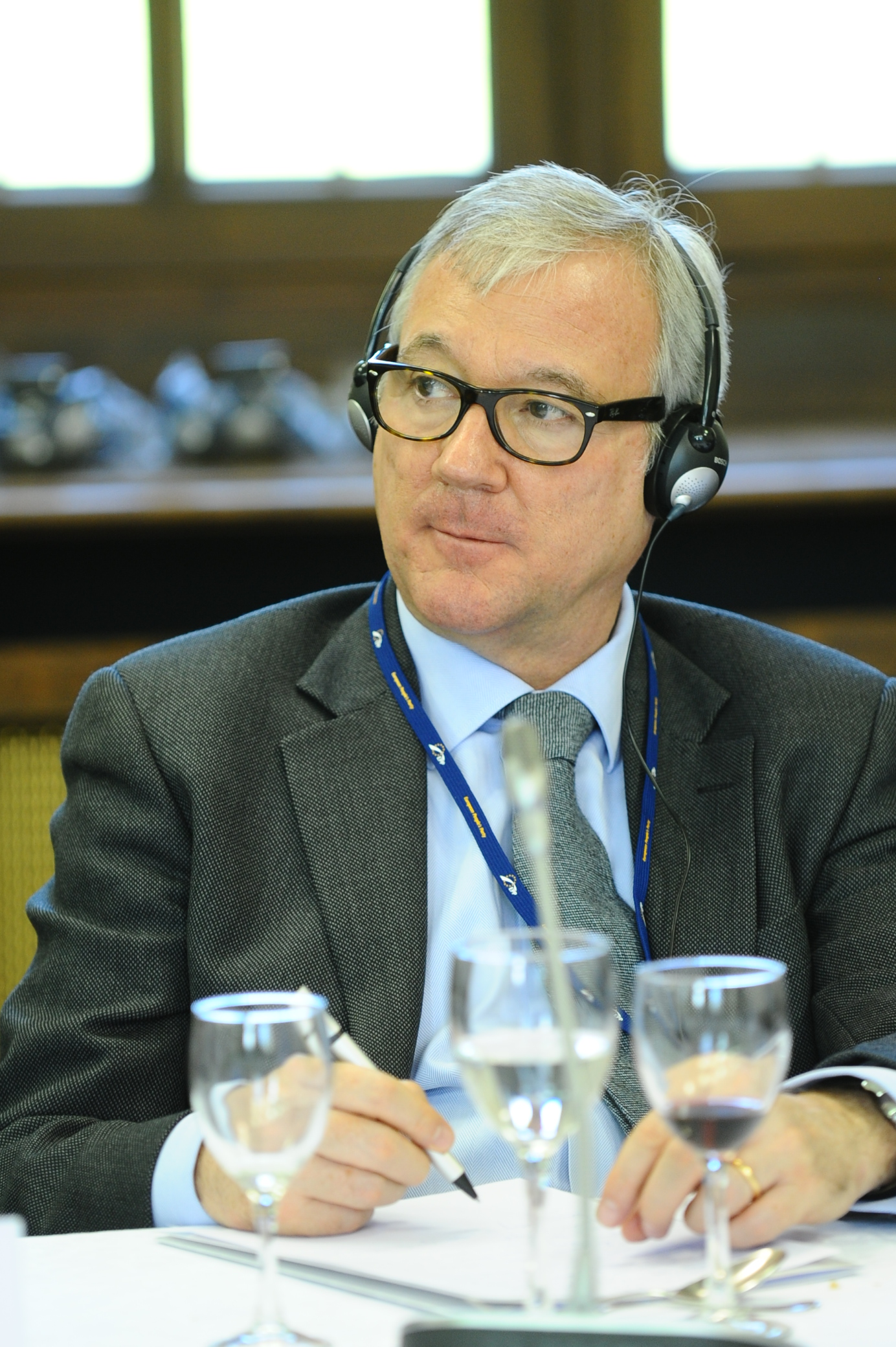
- Valcárcel in 2011

Member of the European Parliament
- In office 1 July 2014 – 9 June 2024
- Constituency: Spain

President of the Region of Murcia
- In office 3 July 1995 – 14 April 2014
- Monarch: Juan Carlos I
- Preceded by: María Antonia Martínez
- Succeeded by: Alberto Garre López

Personal details
- Born: Ramon Luis Valcárcel Siso; 16 November 1954 (age 71) Murcia, Spain
- Party: Spain: People's Party; EU: European People's Party
- Spouse: Camila Valcárcel
- Children: 3
- Education: University of Murcia

Ramon Luis Valcárcel Siso (born 16 November 1954) is a Spanish politician and former Member of the European Parliament from Spain. He served in the Parliament between the 2014 and 2024 elections.

Prior to his service in the European Parliament, he served as President of the Autonomous Community of the Region of Murcia from 1995 to 2014, and as a former president of the Committee of the Regions (CoR) of the European Union.

== Early life ==
He was born 16 November 1954 in Murcia, Spain.

== Career ==
=== Member of the European Parliament, 2014–present ===
Valcárcel has since been serving as Vice-president of the European Parliament and a member of its Committee on Regional Development. In his capacity as vice-president, he is also in charge of overseeing the parliament's research service and library; relations with national parliaments; and relations with the Committee of the Regions and the European Economic and Social Committee.

In 2015, news media reported that Valcárcel was included in a Russian blacklist of prominent people from the European Union who are not allowed to enter the country.
