= Juan Vicente Herrera =

Spanish politician

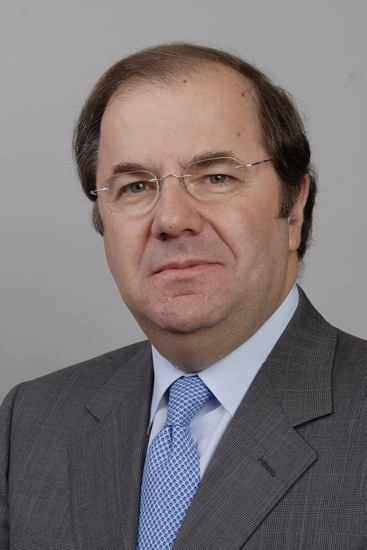

President of the Junta of Castile and León
- In office 16 March 2001 – 11 July 2019
- Monarchs: Juan Carlos I Felipe VI
- Preceded by: Juan José Lucas
- Succeeded by: Alfonso Fernández Mañueco

Personal details
- Born: 23 January 1956 (age 70) Burgos, Castille and Leon, Spain
- Party: PP
- Education: University of Navarra

Juan Vicente Herrera Campo (born 23 January 1956) is a Spanish politician who served as President of the Junta of Castile and León from 2001 to 2019 and a member of the conservative People's Party.

He was spokesperson for his party's parliamentary group in the regional parliament since 1995 until 2001 when Juan José Lucas, then President of the regional government, was appointed Minister of the Presidency and Herrera was named new president.
