= 2020 in Spain =

- Decades: 2000s; 2010s; 2020s; 2030s
- See also: History of Spain; Timeline of Spanish history; List of years in Spain

Events in the year 2020 in Spain.

== Incumbents ==
- Monarch: Felipe VI
- Prime Minister: Pedro Sánchez
- President of the Congress of Deputies: Meritxell Batet
- President of the Senate of Spain: Pilar Llop
- President of the Supreme Court: Carlos Lesmes
- President of the Constitutional Court: Juan José González Rivas
- Attorney General:
  - María José Segarra (until 15 January)
  - Luis Navajas (acting 15 January – 26 February)
  - Dolores Delgado (since 26 February)
- Chief of the Defence Staff: Miguel Ángel Villarroya Vilalta
- President of the Episcopal Conference:
  - Ricardo Blázquez (until 3 March)
  - Juan José Omella (since 3 March)
- Sánchez II Government

=== Regional presidents ===
- Andalusia: Juan Manuel Moreno Bonilla
- Aragón: Javier Lambán
- Asturias: Adrián Barbón
- Balearic Islands: Francina Armengol
- Basque Country: Iñigo Urkullu
- Canary Islands: Ángel Víctor Torres
- Cantabria: Miguel Ángel Revilla
- Castilla–La Mancha: Emiliano García-Page
- Castile and León: Alfonso Fernández Mañueco
- Catalonia: Quim Torra
- Extremadura: Guillermo Fernández Vara
- Galicia: Alberto Núñez Feijóo
- La Rioja: Concha Andreu
- Community of Madrid: Isabel Díaz Ayuso
- Region of Murcia: Fernando López Miras
- Navarre: María Chivite
- Valencian Community: Ximo Puig
- Ceuta: Juan Jesús Vivas
- Melilla: Eduardo de Castro

== Events ==
- 25 January – Scheduled date for presentation of the 34th Goya Awards
- 19 February – The investigation into the Bolivian diplomatic incident is completed. The Spanish government accuses the Bolivian government of risking the safety of its diplomats while emphasizing the desire to continue good relations with the South American country.
- COVID-19 pandemic in Spain

== Deaths ==
=== January ===
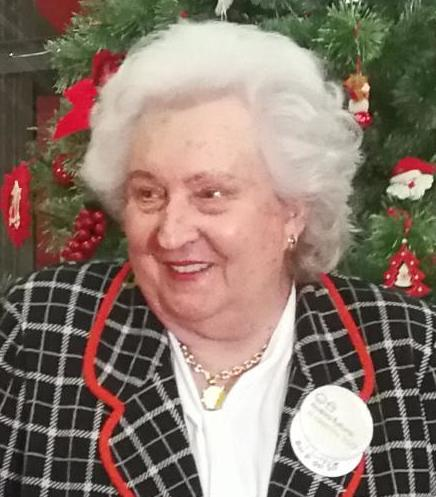
Infanta Pilar, Duchess of Badajoz

- 7 January – Jaime Monzó (also spelled Jaume), swimmer (b. 1946).
- 8 January – Infanta Pilar, Duchess of Badajoz (b. 1936).
- 13 January – Isabel-Clara Simó, journalist and writer (b. 1943).
- 21 January – Meritxell Negre, singer (b. 1971).
- 22 January – Roser Rahola d'Espona, editor and baroness (b. 1914).
- 30 January – Mauro Varela, politician and banker (b. 1941).

=== February ===
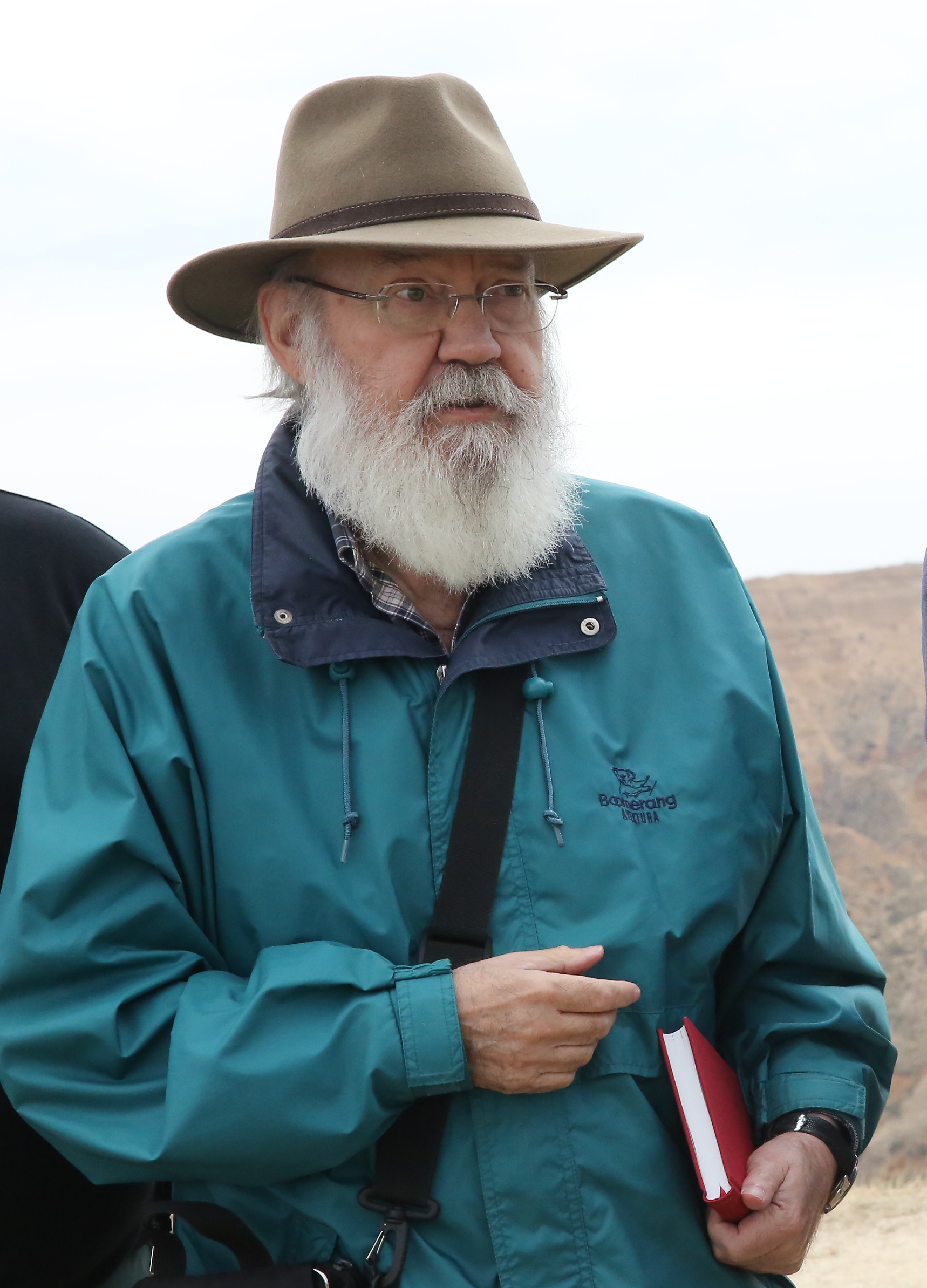
José Luis Cuerda

- 4 February – José Luis Cuerda, director, screenwriter and producer (b. 1947)
- 8 February – Carlos Rojas Vila, author (b. 1928)
- 9 February – David Gistau, TV writer and novelist, brain injury (b. 1970).
- 10 February – Diana Garrigosa, teacher and activist (b. 1944).
- 12 February – Miguel Cordero del Campillo, veterinarian, parasitologist, academic and politician (b. 1925).
- 13 February – Rafael Romero Marchent, film director, actor and screenwriter (b. 1926).
- 18 February – Jaime Amat, Olympic field hockey player (b. 1941)
- 19 February – Fernando Morán, diplomat and politician (b. 1926).
- 24 February – Juan Eduardo Zúñiga, literary scholar and writer (b. 1919).
- 26 February – Eduardo Bort, guitarist (b. 1948).

=== March ===
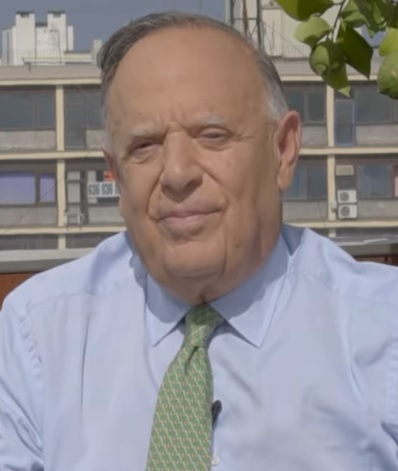
Carlos Falcó

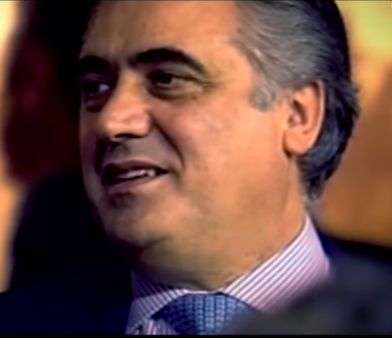
Lorenzo Sanz

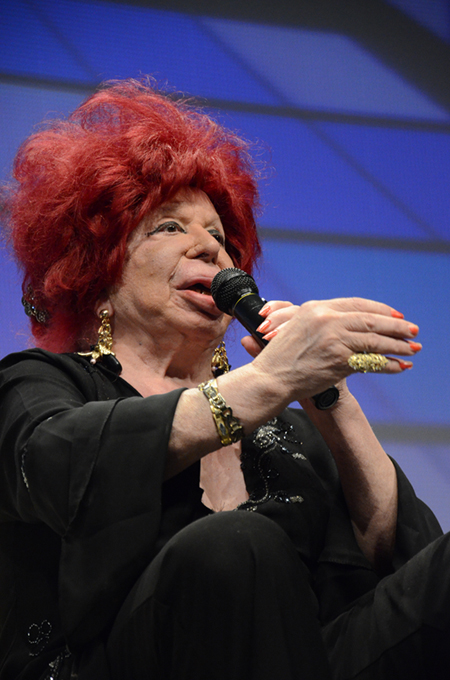
Carmen de Mairena

- 9 March
  - José Jiménez Lozano, writer, Miguel de Cervantes Prize winner (b. 1930).
  - Luis Racionero, writer (b. 1940).
- 18 March – Joaquín Peiró, football player and manager, (b. 1936).
- 20 March – Carlos Falcó, 5th Marquess of Griñón, socialite and entrepreneur, Grandee of Spain (b. 1937).
- 21 March – Lorenzo Sanz, businessman and sports executive (b. 1943).
- 22 March
  - Germà Colón, philologist (b. 1928).
  - Máximo Hernández, 74, football player and manager (b. 1945).
  - Benito Joanet, football player and coach (b. 1935).
  - José María Loizaga Viguri, businessman (b. 1936)
  - Carmen de Mairena, actress, cuplé singer and television personality (b. 1933).
- 23 March
  - Lucia Bosè, Italian-born actress and beauty pageant winner (b. 1931).
  - José Folgado, businessman and politician (b. 1944).
  - José García González, psychiatrist and neurologist (b. 1938).
- 27 March – Jesús Gayoso Rey, Civil Guard lieutenant colonel (b. 1971).
- 28 March – Chato Galante, pro-democracy activist and political prisoner (b. 1948).
- 29 March – José Luis Capón, footballer (b. 1948).
- 31 March
  - Rafael Gómez Nieto, resistance fighter (b. 1921).
  - Daniel Yuste, Olympic racing cyclist (b. 1944).

=== April ===
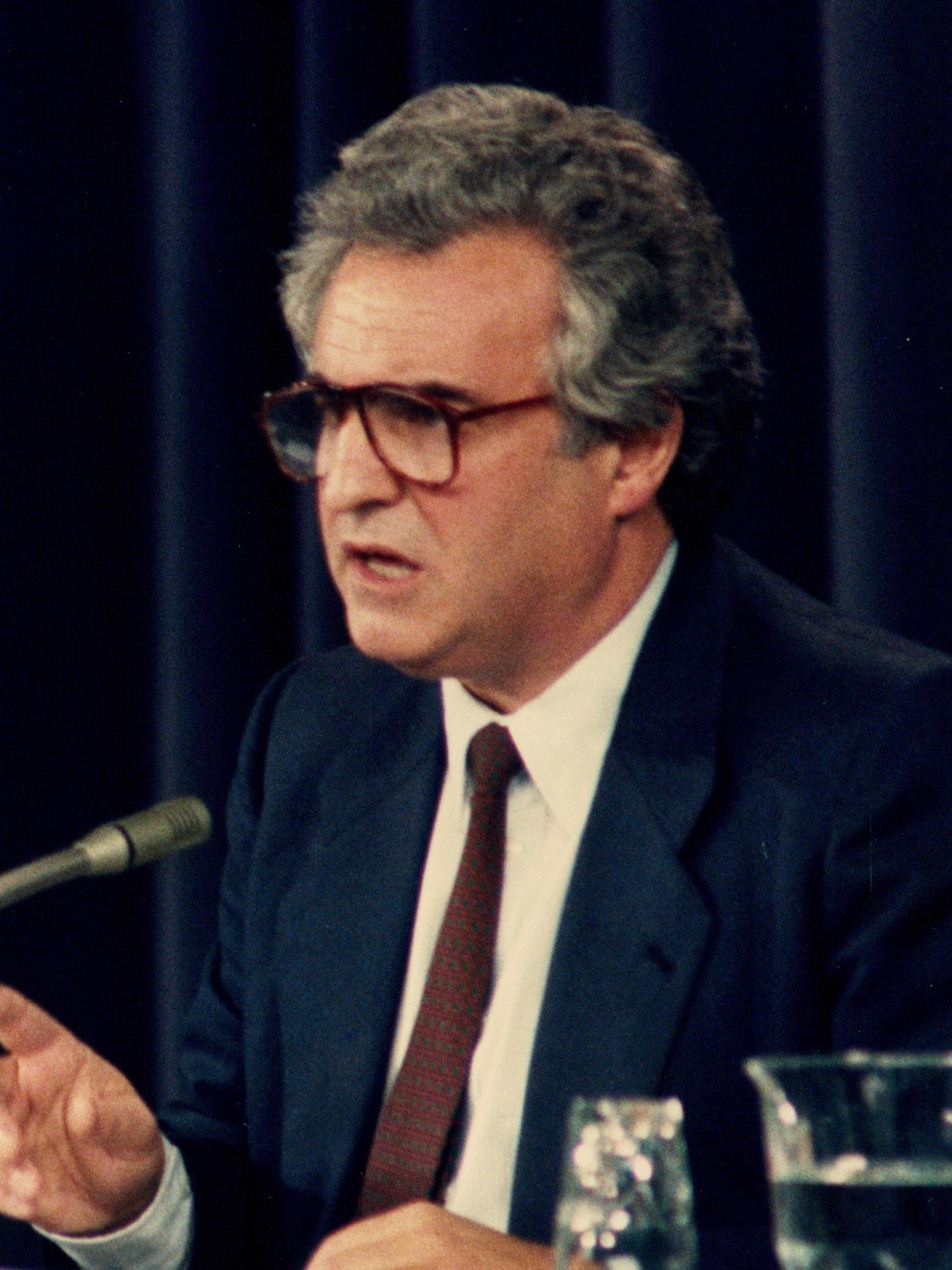
Enrique Múgica

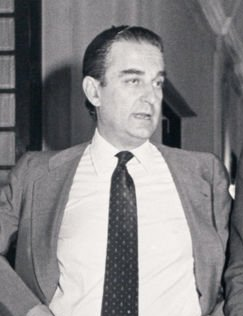
Landelino Lavilla

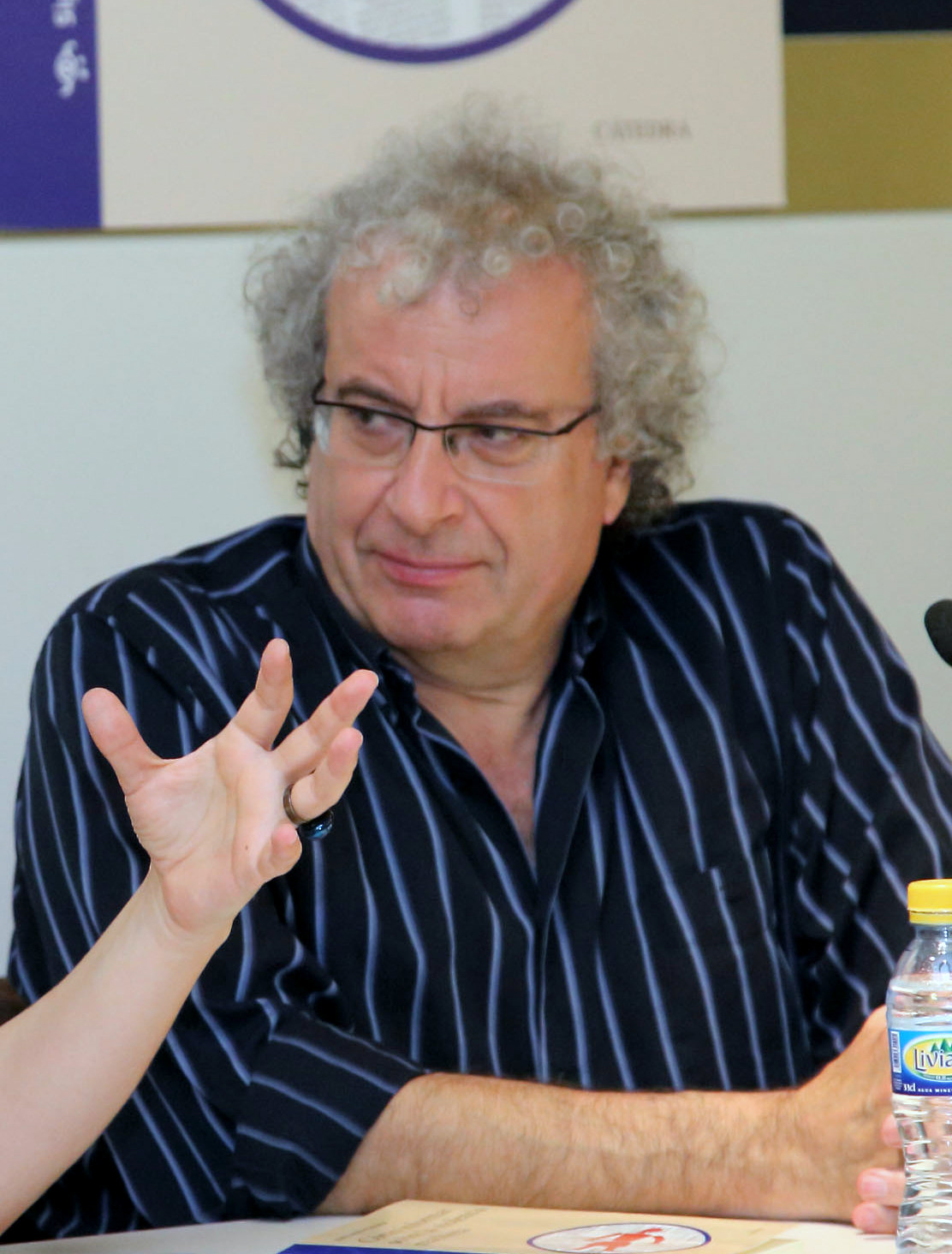
José María Calleja

- 1 April – Ricardo Díez Hochleitner, economist and diplomat (b. 1928).
- 2 April – Goyo Benito, football player (b. 1946).
- 3 April – Francisco Hernando Contreras, housing developer (b. 1945).
- 4 April – Luis Eduardo Aute, artist (b. 1943).
- 6 April
  - Josep Maria Benet i Jornet, playwright and screenwriter (b. 1940).
  - Alfonso Cortina, businessman (b. 1944).
  - Riay Tatary, Syrian-born doctor and imam (b. 1948).
- 8 April – Miguel Jones, footballer (b. 1938).
- 10 April
  - Antonio Carro, politician (b. 1923).
  - Enrique Múgica, lawyer and politician (b. 1932).
  - Iris M. Zavala, Puerto Rican author, independence activist and intellectual (b. 1936).
- 11 April – Antonio Ferres, writer and poet (b. 1924).
- 12 April
  - Francisco Aritmendi, Olympic long-distance runner (b. 1938).
  - Mary Begoña, vedette and actress (b. 1929).
  - Carlos Seco Serrano, historian (b. 1923).
- 13 April
  - Baldiri Alavedra, footballer (b. 1944).
  - Juan Cotino, businessman and politician (b. 1950).
  - Landelino Lavilla Alsina, lawyer and politician (b. 1934).
- 16 April – Santiago Lanzuela, politician (b. 1948).
- 17 April – Jesús Vaquero, neurosurgeon (b. 1950).
- 18 April – Aurelio Campa, footballer (b. 1933).
- 20 April – Josep Sala Mañé, casteller (b. 1938).
- 21 April
  - José María Calleja, journalist, political prisoner and anti-ETA activist (b. 1955).
  - Miguel Ángel Troitiño, geographer (b. 1947).
- 22 April – El Príncipe Gitano, flamenco singer and actor (b. 1928).
- 23 April – Bernardino Lombao, athlete and personal trainer (b. 1938).

=== May ===
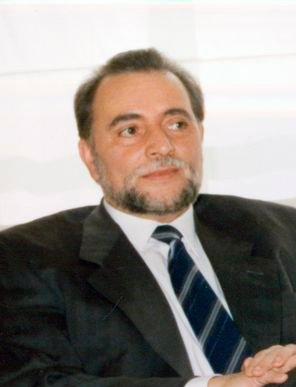
Julio Anguita

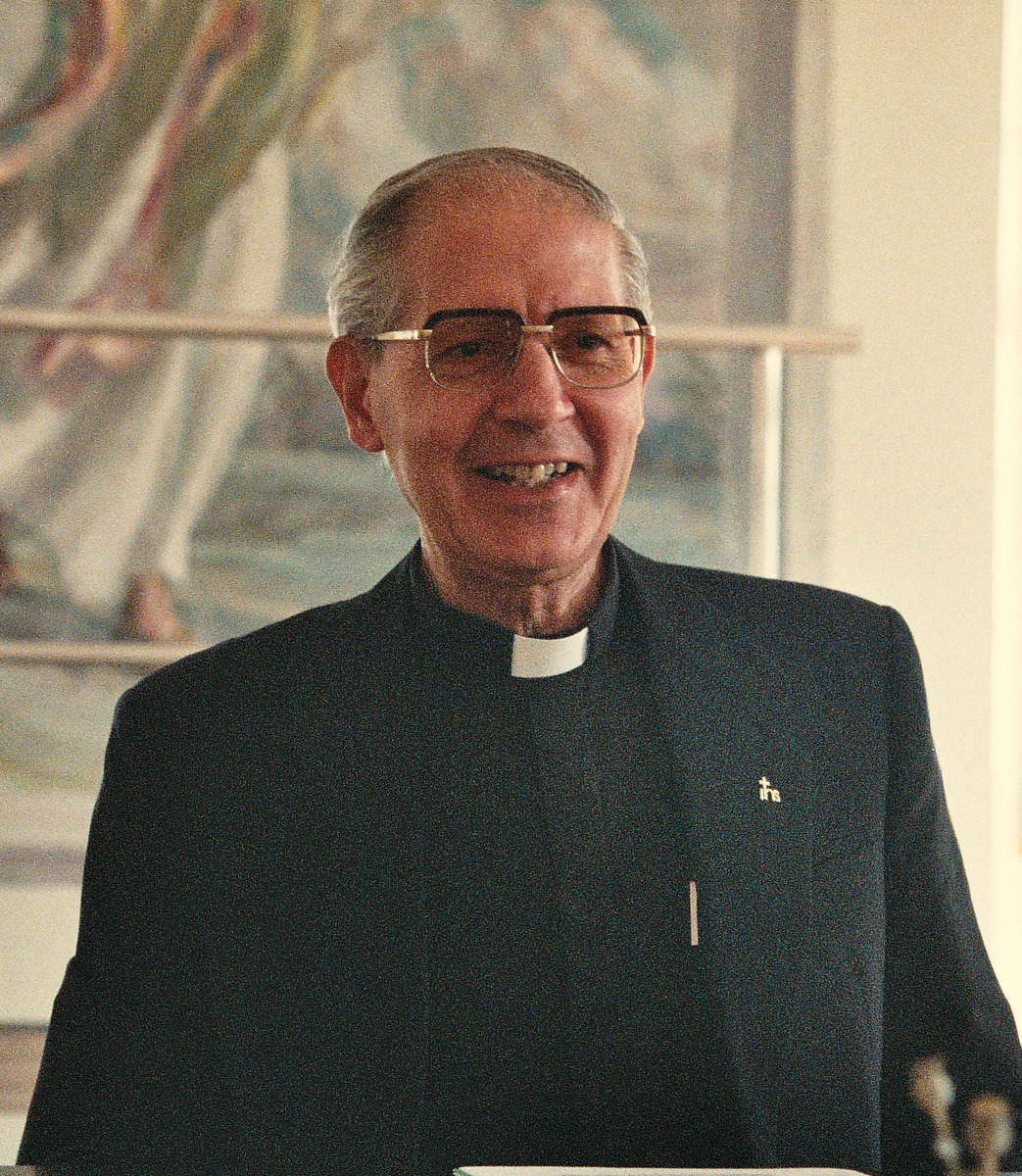
Adolfo Nicolás

- 1 May
  - África Lorente Castillo, politician and activist (b. 1954).
  - Benjamín Moreno, footballer (b. 1955).
- 7 May
  - Antonio González Pacheco, Francoist police inspector and torturer (b. 1946).
  - Manuel Jove, businessman (b. 1941).
- 10 May – José López Calo, musicologist and priest (b. 1922).
- 11 May – Francisco Aguilar, footballer (b. 1949).
- 13 May – Adolfo Pajares, politician (b. 1937)
- 15 May – Juan Genovés, painter and graphic artist (b. 1930).
- 16 May – Julio Anguita, politician and communist leader (b. 1941).
- 20 May – Adolfo Nicolás, Roman Catholic Jesuit priest and Superior General (b. 1936).
- 21 May – Lluís Juste de Nin, cartoonist and fashion designer (b. 1945).
- 22 May – Antonio Bonet Correa, art historian (b. 1925).
- 25 May – Marcelino Campanal, footballer (b. 1932).
- 26 May – Miguel Artola Gallego, historian (b. 1923)

=== June ===
- 4 June - Antonio Rodríguez de las Heras, Spanish historian and academic (b. 1947)
- 6 June - Jordi Mestre, Spanish actor (b. 1981)
- 9 June – Pau Donés, Spanish singer songwriter and guitarist (b. 1966)
- 11 June – Rosa Maria Sardà, Spanish actress (b. 1941)
- 12 June - Juli Sanclimens i Genescà, Spanish politician (b. 1935)
- 13 June - Pepe el Ferreiro, Spanish archaeologist (b. 1942)
- 16 June
  - Federico Corriente, Spanish Arabist, lexicographer and academic (b. 1940)
  - Eusebio Vélez, Spanish racing cyclist (b. 1935)
- 19 June – Carlos Ruiz Zafón, Spanish novelist (b. 1964)
- 20 June - Maria Lluïsa Oliveda Puig, Spanish actress (b. 1922)
- 28 June - Zuriñe del Cerro, Spanish feminist activist (b. 1956)

=== July ===
- 6 July - Carme Contreras i Verdiales, Spanish actress (b. 1932)
- 10 July - Pep Mòdol, Spanish politician and writer (b. 1957)
- 13 July - Camilo Lorenzo Iglesias, Spanish Roman Catholic prelate (b. 1940)
- 15 July
  - Juan José García Corral, Spanish bullfighter (b. 1952)
  - Ana Romero Reguera, Spanish fighting bull rancher (b. 1931/1932)
- 18 July
  - Juan Marsé, Spanish novelist, journalist and screenwriter (b. 1933)
  - Lucio Urtubia, Spanish counterfeiter, robber and kidnapper (b. 1931)
- 21 July - Francisco Rodríguez Adrados, Spanish Hellenist, translator and linguist (b. 1922)
- 26 July
  - Francisco Frutos, Spanish politician (b. 1939)
  - Lluís Serrahima, Spanish writer (b. 1931)
- 28 July - José Luis García Ferrero, Spanish veterinarian and politician (b. 1929)
- 31 July - Joan Mari Torrealdai, 77, Spanish writer and journalist (b. 1942)

=== August ===
- 1 August
  - Pablo Aranda, Spanish writer (b. 1968)
  - Julio Diamante, Spanish film director (b. 1930)
- 5 August - María Victoria Morera, Spanish diplomat (b. 1956)
- 8 August - Pedro Casaldáliga, Spanish-Brazilian Roman Catholic prelate (b. 1928)
- 9 August - Fernando Garfella Palmer, Spanish underwater documentary filmmaker and maritime activist (b. 1989)
- 11 August - Juan Pastor Marco, Spanish politician (b. 1951)
- 14 August - Francesc Badia Batalla, Spanish-born Andorran civil servant and magistrate (b. 1923)
- 26 August - José Lamiel, Spanish painter and sculptor (b. 1924)
- 30 August - Ángel Faus Belau, Spanish journalist and academic (b. 1936)

=== September ===
- 3 September - Félix Suárez Colomo, Spanish Olympic racing cyclist (b. 1950)
- 12 September - Joaquín Carbonell, Spanish singer-songwriter, journalist and poet (b. 1947)
- 14 September
  - Enrique Ramón Fajarnés, Spanish lawyer and politician (b. 1929)
  - Fer, Spanish comics artist (b. 1949)
- 15 September - Vital Alsar, Spanish sailor and scientist (b. 1933)
- 16 September
  - Núria Gispert i Feliu, Spanish politician (b. 1936)
  - Enrique Irazoqui, Spanish actor (b. 1944)
- 20 September - Gerardo Vera, Spanish costume designer, film director and actor (b. 1947)
- 24 September - Jaime Blanco García, Spanish politician (b. 1944)
- 28 September - Juan Carlos Guerra Zunzunegui, Spanish lawyer and politician (b. 1935)

=== October ===
- 6 October - Alfons Borrell i Palazón, Spanish abstract painter (b. 1931)
- 7 October - Manuel Guerra, Spanish Olympic swimmer (b. 1928)
- 13 October - Marisa de Leza, Spanish actress (b. 1933)
- 15 October - Antonio Ángel Algora Hernando, Spanish Roman Catholic prelate (b. 1940)
- 17 October - Aurora Chamorro, Spanish Olympic swimmer (b. 1954)
- 18 October - José Padilla, Spanish DJ (b. 1955)
- 19 October - Joan Mesquida, Spanish politician (b. 1962)
- 25 October - Dolores Abril, Spanish singer and actress (b. 1939)
- 29 October - Pablo Lozano, Spanish bullfighter and fighting bull cattle rancher (b. 1932)
- 31 October - Eduardo Castelló, Spanish racing cyclist (b. 1940)

=== November ===
- 1 November
  - Pedro Iturralde, Spanish saxophonist and composer (b. 1929)
  - Tinín, Spanish matador (b. 1946)
- 9 November
  - Domènec Fita i Molat, Spanish painter and sculptor (b. 1927)
  - Carlos G. Vallés, Spanish-Indian Jesuit priest and author (b. 1925)
- 10 November
  - Luis Ibero, Spanish politician (b. 1949)
  - Juan Sol, Spanish footballer (b. 1947)
- 11 November
  - Francesc-Xavier Ciuraneta Aymí, Spanish Roman Catholic prelate (b. 1940)
  - Jorge Llopart, Spanish race walker (b. 1952)
- 14 November - Adolfo Bolea, Spanish football player (b. 1933)
- 24 November
  - Montserrat Carulla, Spanish actress (b. 1930)
  - Damián Iguacén Borau, Spanish Roman Catholic prelate (b. 1916)
- 26 November - Alfonso Milián Sorribas, Spanish Roman Catholic prelate (b. 1939)
- 28 November - Juan de Dios Román, Spanish handball coach (b. 1942)

=== December ===
- 1 December
  - Faustino Amiano, Spanish Olympic coxswain (b. 1944)
  - Juan Hormaechea, Spanish politician (b. 1939)
- 8 December - Jordi Nadal, Spanish historian and economist (b. 1929)
- 15 December
  - Manuel Costas, Spanish footballer (b. 1942)
  - Jorge García, Spanish footballer (b. 1957)
- 25 December - Antonio Gento, Spanish footballer (b. 1940)
- 26 December - Gregorio Salvador Caja, Spanish linguist (b. 1927)
- 30 December
  - Josep Corominas i Busqueta, Spanish doctor and politician (b. 1939)
  - Gaztelu, Spanish footballer (b. 1946)
