= 1930 in Spain =

- Decades: 1910s; 1920s; 1930s; 1940s; 1950s
- See also: History of Spain; Timeline of Spanish history; List of years in Spain

Events in the year 1930 in Spain.

== Incumbents ==
- Monarch: Alfonso XIII
- President of the Council of Ministers: Miguel Primo de Rivera (until 30 January), Dámaso Berenguer (starting 30 January)

== Births ==
- 28 January – Luis de Pablo, composer (died 2021)
- 31 March – Julián Herranz Casado, cardinal
- 4 June – Vicente Alejandro Guillamón, journalist and writer (died 2021)
- 19 June – Victoriano Ríos Pérez, physician and politician (died 2018)
- 2 October – Antonio Gala, poet, playwright and novelist (died 2023)
- 27 October – Francisca Aguirre, poet (died 2019)
- 16 November – Andrés Reguera, politician (died 2000)
- 6 December – Carmelo Cedrún, football player and manager (died 2026)
- 24 December – Arsenio Iglesias, football player and manager (died 2023)

=== Full date unknown ===
- Luis Miravitlles, scientist and writer (died 1995)

== Deaths ==
- October 20 – Valeriano Weyler, 1st Duke of Rubí. (b. 1838)
