= 1928 in Spain =

- Decades: 1900s; 1910s; 1920s; 1930s; 1940s
- See also: Other events of 1928; List of years in Spain

Events in the year 1928 in Spain.

== Incumbents ==
- Monarch: Alfonso XIII
- President of the Council of Ministers: Miguel Primo de Rivera

== Events ==
- Date Unknown – Vías, as predecessor of construction brand in Europe and world, ACE Group was founded.

== Births ==
- 16 January - Pilar Lorengar, soprano (d. 1996 in Germany)
- 14 March - Félix Rodríguez de la Fuente, naturalist and broadcaster (d. 1980 in Spain)
- 18 March - José María Setién, Roman Catholic prelate (d. 2018 in Spain)
- 9 July - Federico Bahamontes, road racing cyclist (d. 2023 in Spain)
- 18 July - Manuel Guerra, swimmer (d. 2020 in Spain)
- 24 August - Antonio Ozores, actor (d. 2010 in Spain)
- 14 November - Bernabé Martí, operatic tenor (d. 2022)
- 20 November - Pedro Ferrándiz, basketball coach (d. 2022)
