= 1925 in Spain =

- Decades: 1900s; 1910s; 1920s; 1930s; 1940s
- See also: Other events of 1925; List of years in Spain

Events in the year 1925 in Spain.

== Incumbents ==
- Monarch: Alfonso XIII
- President of the Council of Ministers: Miguel Primo de Rivera

== Events ==
- 8 May - The final attack in the Rif War is launched by France and Spain, who between them field 123,000 men, supported by 150 aircraft, against 12,000 Rifians.

== Births ==
- 8 January - Bernardo Ruiz, road bicycle racer (died 2025)
- 11 February - Amparo Rivelles, actress (died 2013)
- 4 June - Antonio Puchades, footballer (died 2014)
- 16 September - Odón Betanzos Palacios, poet, novelist and literary critic (died 2007)
- 26 September - Manuel Izquierdo, sculptor and woodcut artist (died 2009)
- 5 October - Emiliano Aguirre, palaeontologist (died 2021)
- 20 December - Oriol Bohigas, architect and urban planner (died 2021)

=== Date unknown ===
- Serafín Rojo, Spanish cartoon humorist and painter (died 2003)
- Ignacio Sanuy, musicologist, journalist, lawyer, music critic and historian (died 1995)

== Deaths ==
- 23 September - Miguel Zabalza, Olympic fencer (born 1896).
