= 1924 in Spain =

- Decades: 1900s; 1910s; 1920s; 1930s; 1940s
- See also: Other events of 1924; List of years in Spain

Events in the year 1924 in Spain.

== Incumbents ==
- Monarch: Alfonso XIII
- President of the Council of Ministers: Miguel Primo de Rivera

== Births ==
- 10 January - Eduard Admetlla i Lázaro, scuba diver (d. 2019)
- 25 June - Luis Suárez Fernández, historian (d. 2024)

== Deaths ==
- 18 July - Àngel Guimerà, playwright and poet (b. 1847).
- Eugenio Agacino y Martínez, sailor and writer (b. 1851).
