= 1929 in Spain =

- Decades: 1900s; 1910s; 1920s; 1930s; 1940s
- See also: History of Spain; Timeline of Spanish history; List of years in Spain

Events in the year 1929 in Spain.

== Incumbents ==
- Monarch: Alfonso XIII
- President of the Council of Ministers: Miguel Primo de Rivera

== Births ==
- 20 March – Germán Robles, Spanish-Mexican actor (d. 2015)
- 15 May - Juanjo Menéndez. (d. 1976)
- 25 July - Manuel Olivencia, Spanish economist, diplomat (d. 2018)
- 31 July - José Santamaría, Spanish footballer (d. 2026)
- 1 November - Francisco Macián, Spanish animator. (d. 2003)
- 14 December – Fernando Sebastián Aguilar, cardinal (d. 2019)
- 27 December - Lucio Muñoz. (d. 1998)

== Deaths ==
- Julio Cervera Baviera.
- March 25 - Ruperto Biete. (b. 1906)
- June 28 - Diego Arias de Miranda. (b. 1845)
