= 1927 in Spain =

- Decades: 1900s; 1910s; 1920s; 1930s; 1940s
- See also: Other events of 1927; List of years in Spain

Events in the year 1927 in Spain.

== Incumbents ==
- Monarch: Alfonso XIII
- President of the Council of Ministers: Miguel Primo de Rivera

== Births ==
- March 18 - Rafael Torija de la Fuente, Spanish Catholic bishop (d. 2019)
- March 31 - Eduardo Martínez Somalo, cardinal (d. 2021)
- May 8 - Josefina Samper, syndicalist and feminist (d. 2018)
- June 8 - Guillermo Luca de Tena, 1st Marquis of the Tena Valley (d. 2010)
- July 18 - Antonio García-Trevijano, republican, political activist, and author (d. 2018)
- October 14 - Juan Hidalgo Codorniu, composer, poet, action and visual artist (d. 2018)
- November 24 - Alfredo Kraus, operatic tenor (d. 1999)

== Deaths ==
- 20 April - Enrique Simonet, artist (b. 1866)
- 5 November - Marceline Orbes, Spanish clown (b. 1873)
