= 2019 in Spain =

- Decades: 1990s; 2000s; 2010s; 2020s; 2030s
- See also: History of Spain; Timeline of Spanish history; List of years in Spain

Events of the year 2019 in Spain.

== Incumbents ==
- Monarch: Felipe VI
- Prime Minister: Pedro Sánchez

=== Regional presidents ===
- Andalusia: Susana Diaz (until 18 January), Juan Manuel Moreno Bonilla (starting 18 January)
- Aragón: Javier Lambán
- Asturias: Javier Fernandez (until 18 July), Adrián Barbón (starting 18 July)
- Balearic Islands: Francina Armengol
- Basque Country: Iñigo Urkullu
- Canary Islands: Fernando Clavijo Batlle (until 11 July), Ángel Víctor Torres (starting 11 July)
- Cantabria: Miguel Ángel Revilla
- Castilla–La Mancha: Emiliano García-Page
- Castile and León: Juan Vicente Herrera (until 11 July), Alfonso Fernández Mañueco (starting 11 July)
- Catalonia: Quim Torra
- Extremadura: Guillermo Fernández Vara
- Galicia: Alberto Núñez Feijóo
- La Rioja: José Ignacio Ceniceros (until 29 August), Concha Andreu (starting 29 August)
- Community of Madrid:
  - until 17 April: Ángel Garrido
  - 17 April–17 August: Pedro Rollán (acting)
  - starting 19 August: Isabel Díaz Ayuso
- Region of Murcia: Fernando López Miras
- Navarre: Uxue Barkos (until 6 August), María Chivite (starting 6 August)
- Valencian Community: Ximo Puig
- Ceuta: Juan Jesús Vivas
- Melilla: Juan José Imbroda (until 15 June), Eduardo de Castro (starting 15 June)

== Events ==
- 16 February - Prime Minister Sánchez announced a snap election for 28 April 2019, After the 2019 General State Budget was voted down by the Congress of Deputies on 13 February 2019.
- 14 October - Supreme Court makes public the sentence of the trial of Catalonia independence leaders.
- 24 October - Former dictator Francisco Franco is exhumed from Valle de los Caídos.
- 7 November - 25-year-old woman Marta Calvo disappears in Valencia.
- 19 November- bicentennial of el Museo Nacional del Prado

== Deaths ==
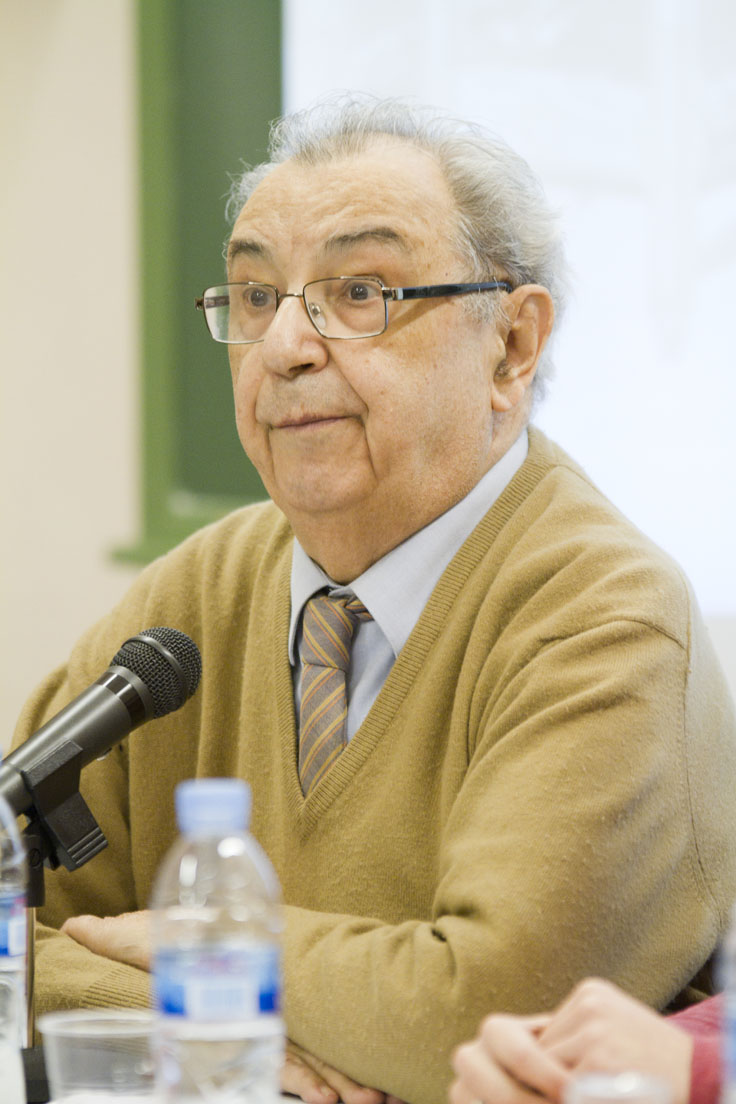
Joan Guinjoan

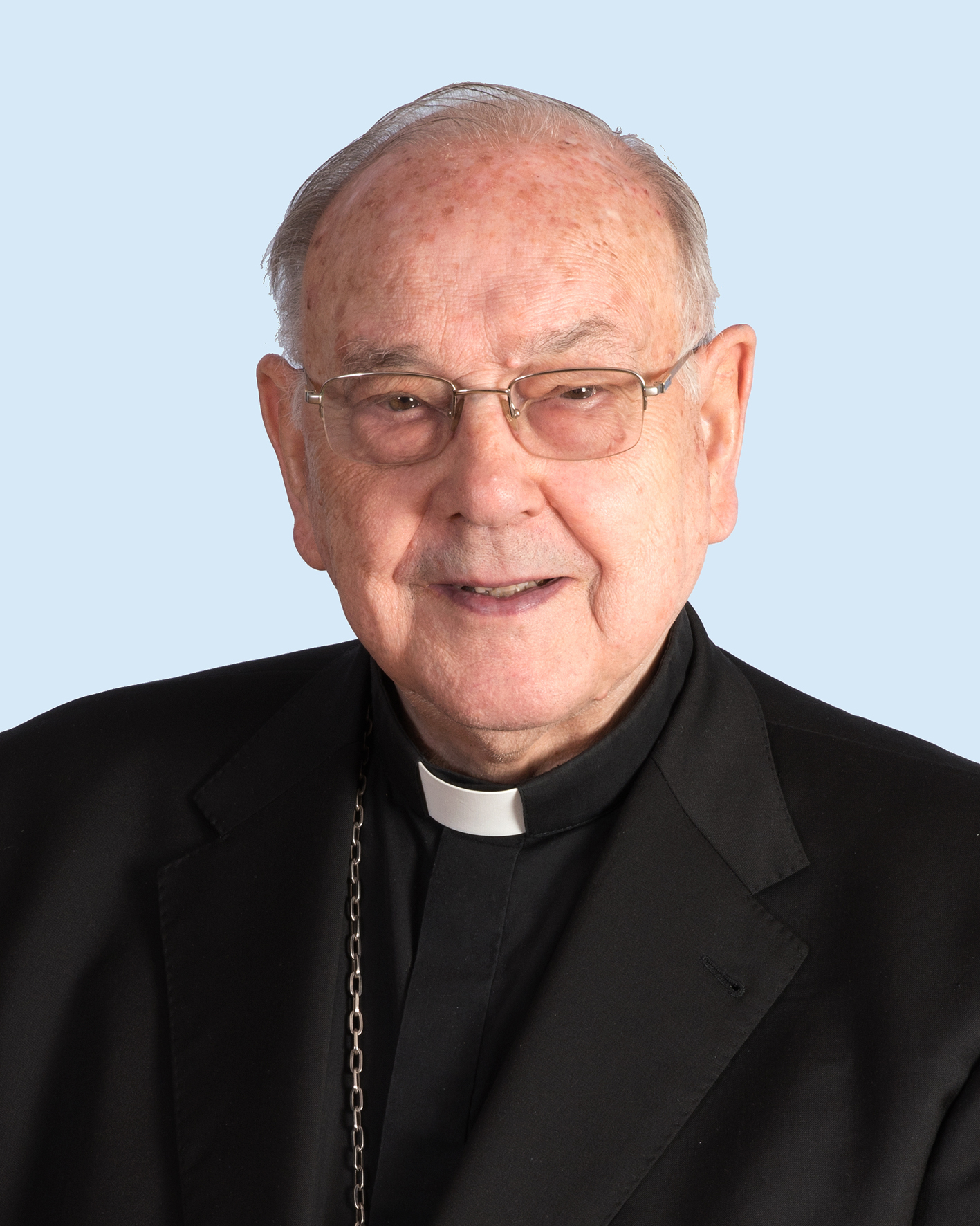
Fernando Sebastián Aguilar

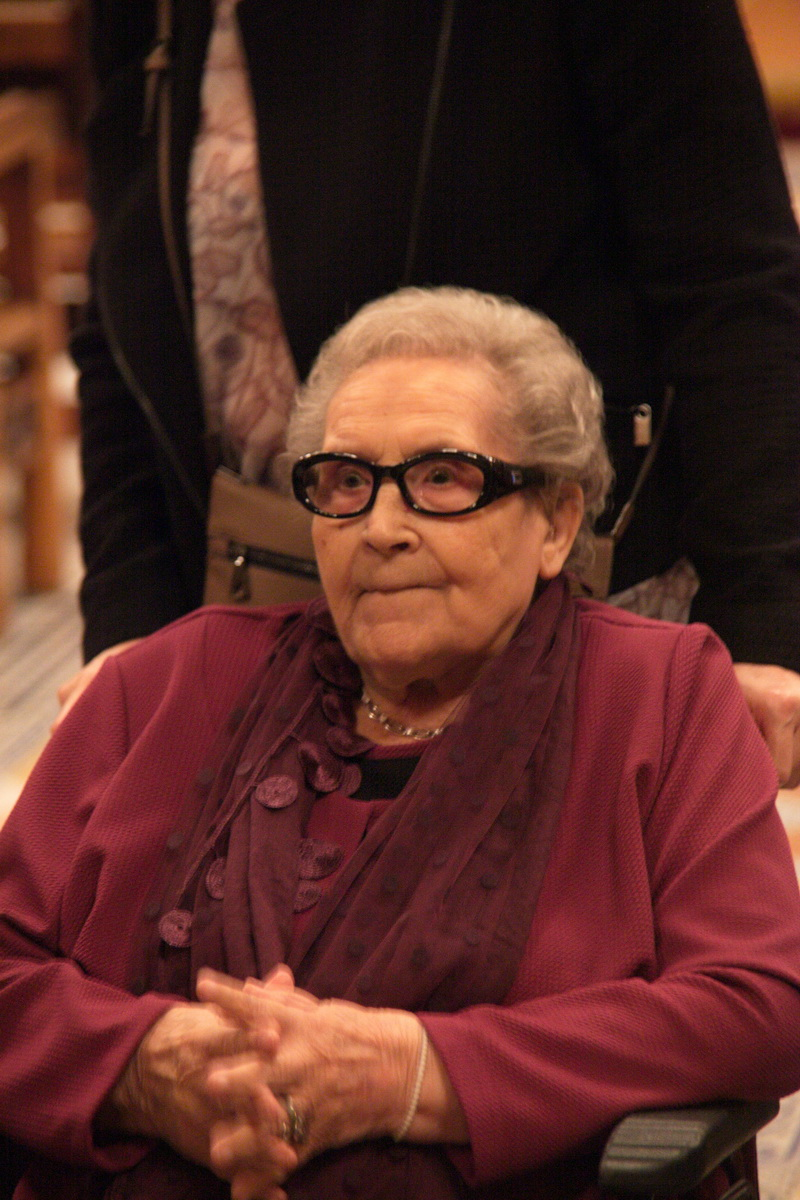
Neus Català

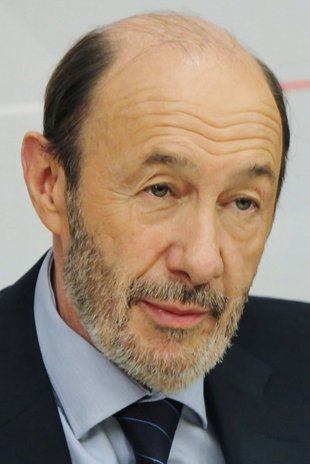
Alfredo Pérez Rubalcaba

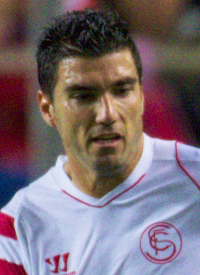
José Antonio Reyes

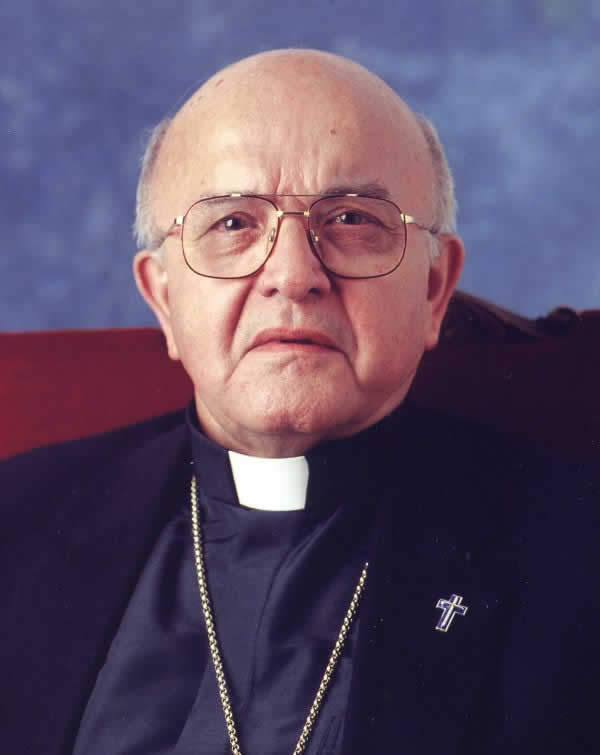
José Manuel Estepa Llaurens

=== January ===
- January 1
  - Joan Guinjoan, Spanish composer and pianist (b. 1931)
  - José Antonio Pujante, Spanish politician (b. 1964)
- January 3 – José Vida Soria, Spanish jurist and politician (b. 1937)
- January 4 – Francisco Olivencia, Spanish lawyer and politician (b. 1934)
- January 17
  - Vicente Álvarez Areces, 75, President of Asturias (1999-2011), Senator (since 2011) and Mayor of Gijón (1987-1999)
  - Gil Carlos Rodríguez Iglesias, 72, President of the European Court of Justice (1994–2003).
- January 20 – Lolo Rico, 83, television director and journalist
- January 24
  - Elio Berhanyer, 89, fashion designer
  - Fernando Sebastián Aguilar, Spanish cardinal (b. 1929)
- January 25 – Jaume Traserra Cunillera, 84, Bishop of Solsona (2001-2010)

=== February ===
- February 4 – Isacio Calleja, Spanish footballer (b. 1936)
- February 28 – Xabier Arzalluz, Spanish lawyer and academic (b. 1932)

=== March ===
- March 3
  - Martí Galindo, Spanish actor (b. 1937)
  - José García Ladrón de Guevara, Spanish politician (b. 1929)
- March 8 – Jaume Muxart, Spanish painter (b. 1922)
- March 11 – Martín Chirino, Spanish sculptor (b. 1925)
- March 15 – Juan Manuel Arza Muñuzuri, Spanish politician and lawyer (b. 1932)
- March 24 – Pancracio Celdrán, Spanish professor, intellectual and journalist (b. 1942)
- March 29 – Josep Esteve i Soler, Spanish pharmaceutical executive (b. 1930)
- March 30 – Paloma Cela, Spanish actress (b. 1943)
- March 31 – José Antonio Gurriarán, Spanish journalist (b. 1938)

=== April ===
- April 13 – Neus Català, Spanish Holocaust survivor, anti-Franco militant and member of the French Resistance (b. 1915)
- April 24 – Conrado San Martín, Spanish actor (b. 1921)
- April 25 – Paloma Tortajada, Spanish broadcaster and journalist (b. 1965)

=== May ===
- May 9 – Manuel Giner Miralles, Spanish politician (b. 1926)
- May 10 – Alfredo Pérez Rubalcaba, Spanish politician (b. 1951)
- May 18 – Analía Gadé, Argentine actress (b. 1931)
- May 22 - Eduard Punset, Spanish politician (b. 1936)
- May 24 – Manuel Pazos, Spanish footballer (b. 1930)

=== June ===
- June 1 – José Antonio Reyes, Spanish footballer (b. 1983
- June 4 – Antoni Roig Muntaner, Spanish chemist and politician (b. 1931)
- June 19 – Rafael de la Sierra, Spanish politician (b. 1948)
- June 22 – Concepción Paredes, Spanish athlete (b. 1970)
- June 30 – Armando Salas, Spanish cartoonist (b. 1946)

=== July ===
- July 2 – José Luis Merino, Spanish film writer and director (b. 1927)
- July 4
  - Eduardo Fajardo, Spanish actor (b. 1924)
  - Arturo Fernández Rodríguez, Spanish actor (b. 1929)
- July 5 – José Muñoz Sánchez, Spanish politician (b. 1962)
- July 21 – José Manuel Estepa Llaurens, Spanish cardinal (b. 1926)

=== September ===
- September 8 - Camilo Sesto, Spanish singer-songwriter (b. 1946)

== See also ==
- 2019 European Parliament election
