= 1926 in Spain =

- Decades: 1900s; 1910s; 1920s; 1930s; 1940s
- See also: History of Spain; Timeline of Spanish history; List of years in Spain

Events in the year 1926 in Spain.

== Incumbents ==
- Monarch: Alfonso XIII
- President of the Council of Ministers: Miguel Primo de Rivera

== Events ==
- Lyceum Club Femenino was established in Madrid

== Births ==
- January 1 - José Manuel Estepa Llaurens, cardinal (d. 2019)
- March 18 - Ángel Peralta Pineda, rejoneador and actor (d. 2018)
- April 25 - Manuel Clavero, lawyer and politician.(d. 2021).
- November 18 - Estanislau Basora, footballer (d. 2012).

== Deaths ==
- June 10 - Antoni Gaudí, architect (b. 1852).
