= Olivencia =

Olivencia is a Spanish surname. Notable people with the surname include:

- Francisco Olivencia (1934–2019), Spanish lawyer and politician
- Jamin Olivencia (born 1985), American professional wrestler
- Janice Olivencia (born 1982), Puerto Rican golfer
- Manuel Olivencia (1929–2018), Spanish lawyer
- Tommy Olivencia (1938–2006), Puerto Rican musician
