= José Ramón García Antón =

Spanish politician and engineer

José Ramón García Antón (20 March 1948 – 11 August 2009) was a Spanish politician and engineer. He served as the head of environment, land and housing for the regional government of the Valencian Community from 1998 until his death in 2009.

He was a member of the Partido Popular (PP).

Antón was a former truck engineer. He was also a roads, canals and ports engineer.

During his eleven-year tenure within the Valencian Generalitat, Antón was responsible for the creation of a tram system called CIVIS currently under construction in Alicante, which was unveiled in April 2007. He also oversaw new anti-flood infrastructure throughout Valencia.

José Ramón García Antón suffered a heart attack at approximately 5:30 PM at his home in San Vicente del Raspeig on August 11, 2009. His daughter found him, but paramedics were unable to revive Antón. He was 61 years old.

He was survived by his wife, Luisa Pastor Lillo, who hold the office of mayor of San Vicente del Raspeig.

His funeral took place at the San Vicente Ferrer Catholic church in San Vicente del Raspeig. His pallbearers included the three regional Valencian vice presidents - Juan Cotino, Gerardo Camps and Vicente Rambla. All major Valencian government ministers attended the funeral, as well as almost all of the mayors in the province of Alicante and the Mayor of Valencia Rita Barberá.

The council held a meeting at the San Vicente del Raspeig Town Hall after the funeral. They unanimously decided to award Valencia's highest honor to García Antón. The award would be presented to his widow, Luisa Pastor, on 9 October 2009.
