= Zuriñe =

Female given name

- Gender: Female
- Language: Basque

Origin
- Meaning: white

Other names
- Related names: Blanca

Zuriñe is a Basque feminine given name meaning "white".

== People ==
- Zuriñe del Cerro (1956–2020), Spanish activist
- Zuriñe Hidalgo (born 1990), Spanish singer
- Zuriñe Rodríguez (born 1982), Spanish triathlete
- Zuriñe Ruiz, Miss Grand Euskadi 2019
