= David Gistau =

Spanish journalist (1970–2020)

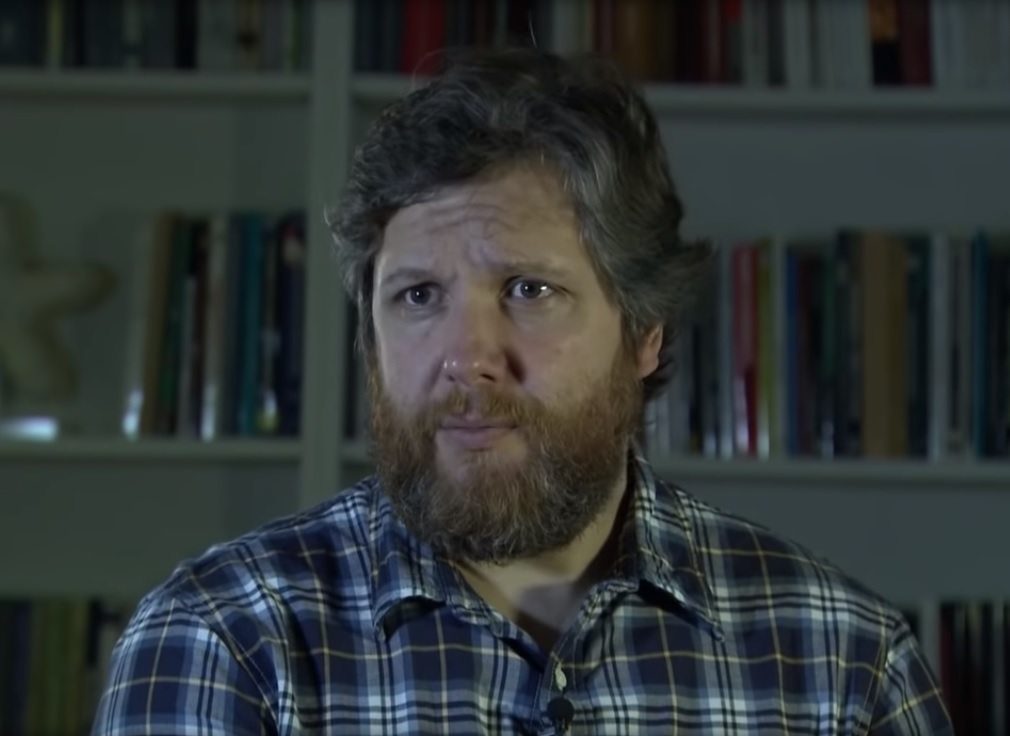
- Born: 19 June 1970; Madrid
- Died: 9 February 2020 (aged 49); Madrid
- Education: Universidad Complutense de Madrid
- Occupations: Journalist, scriptwriter, novelist
- Years active: 1997–2019
- Employer(s): La Razón (1997-2004); El Mundo (2005-2013); ABC (2013-2018); El Mundo (2018–2019)
- Children: 4

David Gistau Retes (19 June 1970 – 9 February 2020) was a Spanish journalist, scriptwriter and novelist.

== Career ==
After finishing his journalism studies at the Universidad Complutense de Madrid, Gistau worked for several major Spanish publications, like La Razón, ABC and El Mundo. In his later years, he primarily wrote as a columnist, earning him an appreciable degree of public notoriety.

== Published books ==
- A que no hay huevos (2004)
- La España de Zetapé (2005)
- ¿Qué nos estás haciendo, ZP? (2007)
- Ruido de fondo (2008)
- Golpes bajos (2017)
- Gente que se fue (2019)

== Personal life ==
A father of three sons and a daughter, Gistau died on 9 February 2020 after what had seemed like a smooth recovery from a brain injury he had sustained while training at a boxing gym in November 2019.

Following his death, many public figures such as political leaders Pedro Sánchez and Pablo Casado, as well as fellow authors Arturo Pérez-Reverte and Manuel Jabois and the president of Real Madrid, Florentino Pérez, offered their condolences.
