= Luisa Pastor Lillo =

Spanish politician (1948–2018)

Luisa Pastor
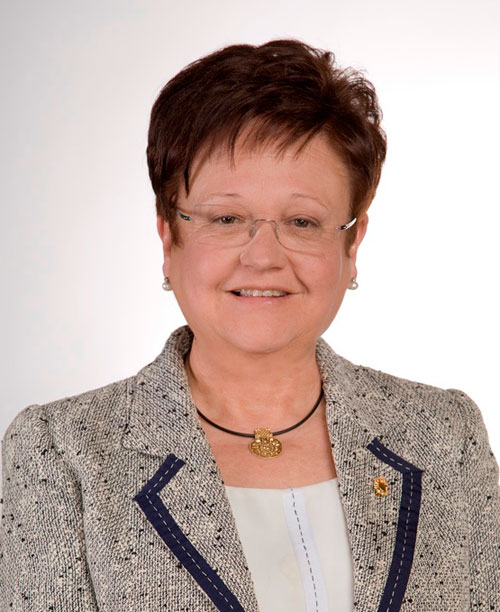

President of Province of Alicante
- In office 13 July 2011 – 17 July 2015

Mayor of San Vicente del Raspeig
- In office 10 October 2001 – 13 July 2015

Personal details
- Born: 10 October 1948; San Vicente del Raspeig, Province of Alicante, Spain
- Died: 18 April 2018 (aged 69); San Vicente del Raspeig, Spain
- Political party: Partido Popular
- Spouse: José Ramón García Antón (until his death 2009)
- Children: 5
- Occupation: Politician

Luisa Pastor Lillo (10 October 1948 – 18 April 2018), was a Spanish politician.

Passionate about the Moors and Christians festivities in San Vicente del Raspeig, she was a member of the "Moros Viejos" comparsa. In 1985 she was the standard-bearer of her comparsa with her husband José Ramón García Antón who was the comparsa captain, along with her sons Carolina and José Ramón who were the standard-bearer and children's captain of the comparsa, respectively.

During 1987 and 1988 Luisa Pastor was correspondent editor of San Vicente del Raspeig in the Información newspaper.

In 1999, while exercising as housekeeper, she began in politics, being the head of the People's Party list in the 1999 municipal elections of San Vicente del Raspeig, after which she failed to achieve the mayoralty to be left behind the PSOE.

The tripartite governed by the socialist Canals was maintained for a year and a half until 10 October 2001, when through a motion of no-confidence, Luisa Pastor became the first mayoress of San Vicente del Raspeig with the votes of the PP, Jaime Antón of the PSVI and the four councilors José Gadea, Elena Moltó, Celia Sáez and Mercedes Medina, who were defectors since May when they had resigned from the PSOE.

In the 2003 Spanish local elections, Luisa Pastor obtained an absolute majority for the first time for her party in San Vicente, taking 11 of the 21 council members of the Plenary. She achieved absolute majorities in 2007 and 2011, the latter with an increase from 21 to 25 councilors.

The duo worked with her husband José Ramón García Antón, who from the Generalitat Valenciana, brought many investments to San Vicente del Raspeig. The municipality during its mandate experienced urban expansion, in which within its policy of investments it emphasized the urban infrastructure, passing from being an industrial city, to a residential one because several companies stopped having activity.

In August 2009, her husband, the regional councillor José Ramón García Antón, suddenly died. In October 2009, it was speculated that she would opt for Secretary-General of the People's Party in the Valencian Community after the vacancy left by Ricardo Costa Climent.

On 13 July 2011 she was elected president of the Provincial Council of Alicante, replacing José Joaquín Ripoll, with 20 members of the popular group compared to 10 of the socialist group. She was the only woman to preside over the provincial institution. Her management was based mainly on the reorganization of the economic accounts, liquidating all the debt of the deputation. She always reconciled her role as mayoress with that of provincial deputy of social services, from 1999 to 2015 she managed this area in the provincial government.

In the 2015 municipal elections, Luisa Pastor stood for her fifth term as mayor.

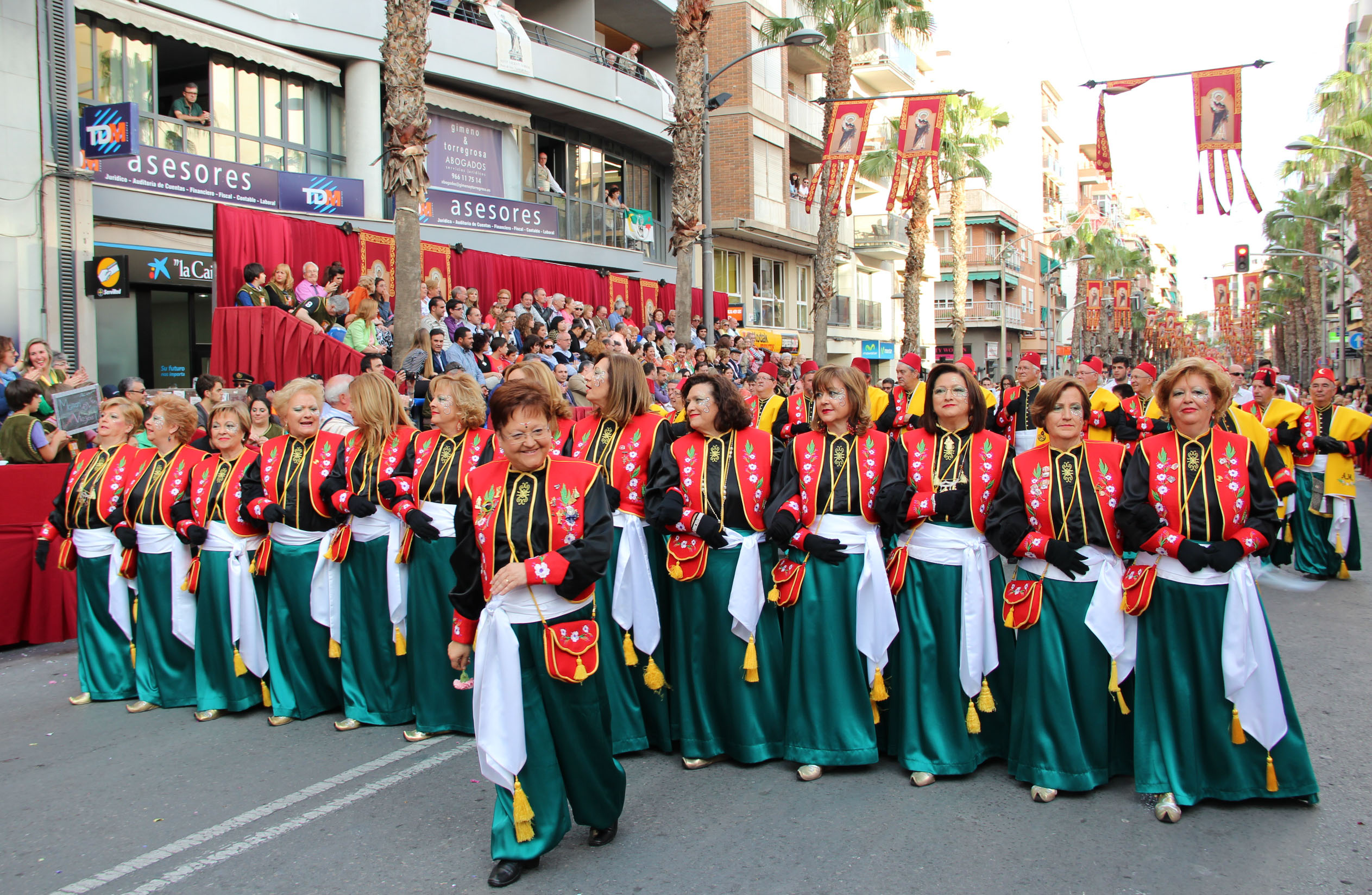
Luisa Pastor leading the "Moros Viejos" comparsa.

Although a decline of the PP was predicted in many municipalities, in San Vicente del Raspeig the surveys kept Pastor in government. But it was not so, and the PP lost 8 councillors, going from 15 to 7, taking just a thousand votes more than the PSOE led by Jesus Villar. Finally the socialist Villar won the mayor's office. In the provincial palace, Pastor was succeeded by César Sánchez, from the same party.

On 10 October 2014, a judge decided to investigate her for the possible relations with the corruption scandal in the "Brugal case".

On 22 October 2015, after 5 months as a councilor in the opposition, she decided to resign her seat for personal reasons. She served 16 years as mayoress of the San Vicente del Raspeig City Council, of which she remained 13 as mayor, 2 as Councillor of Finance with Francisco Canals, and one and a half as councillor in the opposition. Luisa Pastor died on 18 April 2018, at the age of 69, of cancer.
