= José María Loizaga Viguri =

Spanish businessman (1936–2020)

- Born: 9 May 1936; Bilbao, Spain
- Died: 22 March 2020 (aged 83); Ciudad Real, Spain
- Occupation: Businessman
- Known for: Vice President of ACS Group
- Spouse: María Paz Jiménez Martínez

José María Loizaga Viguri (9 May 1936 – 22 March 2020) was a Spanish businessman. He was a director and Vice President of ACS Group, and Vice President of Zardoya Otis, among other companies.

== Biography ==
After graduating in Economics, Loizaga began his professional activity at Banco Vizcaya, where he held various executive positions. In 1968, he became CEO of Zardoya, which in 1972 merged with Schneider Otis. He subsequently assumed the leadership of Otis Elevator in Southern Europe (1972–1980), and was later appointed Vice President of Zardoya Otis.

With the arrival of the eighties, Loizaga founded Banco Hispano Industrial (integrated in the BHA Group). In 1982, he became vice president of Banco Unión, and was also appointed CEO. Soon after, Banco Unión merged with Banco Urquijo. Loizaga remained in that entity until 1985, as Vice President of Banco Urquijo. In 1985, he founded Mercapital Servicios Financieros, a group that he chaired (1985–2008). This company is considered the dean of Spanish venture capital. After merging with N + 1 (now Alantra), it continued to invest under the REA Industrial Portfolio. From 1989 until his death, he was part of the ACS Group board of directors.

He had been Chairman of Bodegas Lan and Bodegas Barón de Ley. board member of Banque Privée Edmond de Rothschild, Suez International, Otis International, AmorimInvestment, Lácteas García Baquero, Unión Fenosa, Mecalux and President of the Hotel Portfolio. His extensive business career allowed him to be a direct witness and protagonist, of the development of Spanish capitalism from 1970 to 2020, both for his status as a director and as a private investor.

== Personal life and death ==
Loizaga was married to María Paz Jiménez Martínez, the couple had three children: Javier, Paz and Rebeca Loizaga Jiménez. He died in Ciudad Real on 22 March 2020 from COVID-19, during the COVID-19 pandemic in Spain.
