= Aurelio Campa =

Spanish footballer (1933–2020)

Personal information
- Full name: Aurelio Campa Serrano
- Date of birth: 10 May 1933
- Place of birth: Madrid, Spain
- Date of death: 18 April 2020 (aged 86)
- Position: Defender

Senior career*
Years	Team	Apps	(Gls)
1953–1955	Real Madrid	4	(0)
1955–1956	CD Badajoz	29	(0)
1956–1961	Las Palmas	21	(0)
1956–1957	→ Granada (loan)	2	(0)
Total		56	(0)
- * Club domestic league appearances and goals

Aurelio Campa Serrano (10 May 1933 – 18 April 2020) was a Spanish professional footballer who played as a defender.

== Career ==
Born in Madrid, Campa played for Real Madrid, CD Badajoz, Las Palmas and Granada.

== Later life and death ==
He died on 18 April 2020, aged 86.
