= Antonio Bonet Correa =

Spanish art historian (1925–2020)

Antonio Bonet Correa (20 October 1925 – 22 May 2020) was a Spanish art historian.
