= Eduard Admetlla i Lázaro =

Catalan scuba diving pioneer and underwater filmmaker

Eduard Admetlla
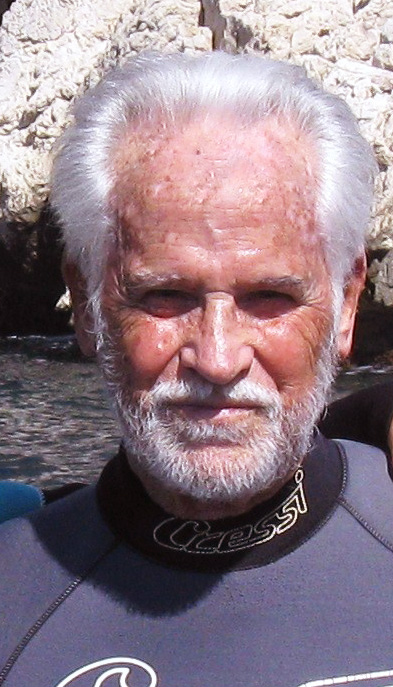
- Eduard Admetlla in 2011
- Born: Eduard Admetlla i Lázaro; 10 January 1924 Barcelona, Spain
- Died: 8 October 2019 (aged 95) Barcelona

Eduard Admetlla i Lázaro (10 January 1924 – 8 October 2019) was a Spanish scuba diving pioneer, underwater cameraman and photographer, designer of underwater camera housings, designer of a self-contained underwater breathing apparatus (scuba), tester of scuba diving gear for the Nemrod trade mark, writer, director of TV series, explorer and broadcaster.

== Biography ==
Admetlla was born in Barcelona (Spain) on 10 January 1924. In 1948 at the age of 24, he started scuba diving. Initially he was an underwater fisherman and became a member of the Asociación de Pesca Submarina de Barcelona (APS) in Barcelona. He soon abandoned this activity as he came to the conclusion that being armed was not the way to go underwater. In 1954 he became a founding member of the Centro de Recuperación y de Investigaciones Submarinas (CRIS). Following that he became an underwater photographer and cameraman. He also invented underwater camera housings and was a test diver of scuba diving gear for the Spanish trade mark Nemrod. In 1953 he designed and tested successfully a prototype of a scuba diving breathing device.

On 30 September 1957, at the Spanish naval base at Cartagena he beat the scuba diving world record by diving to 100 metres (330 ft).

He penned five books describing his underwater experiences: La llamada de las profundidades, Mis amigos los peces, ¡Fondo!, Tierras y profundidades and Mi aventura submarina.

As a follower of Hans Hass and Jacques Yves Cousteau's work, Admetlla i Lázar was a Spanish pioneer of underwater photography and filming. The first documentary TV series that he directed was Rumbo sur, filmed in black and white. After this experience he became professional and founded the film production company Volitans Films, S.L., which filmed the TV series: La llamada de las profundidades recorded in the Seychelles Islands; Nuestras islas, filmed in the Balearic Islands and the Canary Islands (Spain) and Tierras y profundidades in the Caribbean. All of these were broadcast by the Spanish television network RTVE. He also recorded the documentary television series La natura en profunditat for the Catalan Television network TV3.

Eduard Admetlla i Lázaro died on 8 October 2019 at the age of 95.

== Books ==
Admetlla Lázaro, Eduard. La llamada de las profundidades. Editorial Juventud, 1957. Editions 1961, 1999, 2009 and 2010. ISBN 84-605-8808-4

Admetlla Lázaro, Eduard. Mis amigos los peces. Bruguera, 1983. Revised by the author 2010. ISBN 84-02-09549-6.

Admetlla Lázaro, Eduard. ¡Fondo! Plaza & Janes, 1976. ISBN 84-01-33095-5, and ISBN 84-01-48032-9 (paperback)

Admetlla Lázaro, Eduard. Tierras y profundidades. Bruguera, 1983. ISBN 84-02-07764-1.

Admetlla Lázaro, Eduard. Mi aventura submarina. Barcelona: Grijalbo, 1984. ISBN 978-8425315404.

== Television series ==
Year	Series title	Colour	Nº of chapters	Filming location	Television network
1964	Rumbo Sur	Black and white	6	Miramar Studio	RTVE
1975	La llamada de las profundidades	Colour	6	Seychelles Islands	RTVE
1977	Nuestras islas	Colour	13	Balearic and Canary Islands (Spain)	RTVE
1980-81	Tierras y profundidades	Colour	13	Jungle of Venezuela, Orinoco delta and Caribbean sea	RTVE
1983	La natura en profunditat	Colour	13	Venezuela, Caribbean, Costa Brava (Spain) and Galapagos Islands	TV3

== Honours and awards ==
Year	Honour/ Award
1958	First Member with Merit of the Centre de Recuperació i de Investigacions Submarines (CRIS)
1958	Silver medal for Sporting Merit of the Delegación Nacional de Educación Física y Deportes (Nacional Sports Delegation)-SPAIN
1958	Medal for Sporting Merit of the Excma. Diputación Provincial de Barcelona (Barcelona Province Council) - SPAIN
1958	Honorary Member of the Societat Cultural Arca de Noé (Noah's Ark Cultural Society) of Barcelona (SPAIN)
1959	Medal and Diploma for Sporting Merit of the Federación Española de Actividades Subacuáticas (Spanish Scuba Diving Federation)
2007	Honorary Member of the Historical Diving Society Spain (HDSES)
2011	Honorary plaque of the Centro de Buceo de la Armada Española (Diving Centre of the Spanish Navy)
2015	First award for Buzo de Honor (honorary scuba diver) of the Historical Diving Society Spain (HDSES)
