= Luis Ibero =

Spanish politician (1949–2020)

Luis Ibero Elía (Pamplona, 11 July 1949 – Pamplona, 10 November 2020) was a Spanish politician, member of the Convergence of Democrats of Navarre. He served as mayor of Cendea de Cizur from 1979 to 1983, mayor of Zizur Mayor from 1992 to 1995, Minister of Public Works, Transport and Communications of the Government of Navarre from 1995 to 1996, and president of the Mancomunidad de la Comarca de Pamplona from 2003 to 2007.

== Career ==
Ibero's political work began with the founding of a local party made up of residents of Zizur Mayor, which would stand for the first time in the 1979 elections. In 1979, Luis Ibero, number one in the AIZM lists, acceded to the presidency of the Zizurtarra Council as it was the most voted party; he also became the mayor of Cendea de Cizur (later absorbed by Zizur Mayor).

Later, he was displaced from the Presidency of the council by José María Fernández, "Tote" (Cendea Unida), who would govern during a legislature. In 1987, Ibero regained the Presidency, and later became mayor of Zizur Mayor until 1996, when he was called by Juan Cruz There to participate as an advisor to the tripartite PSN-CDN-EA government. Later, he returned to Zizur as second in the CDN candidacy which resulted in the election of two councilors in 1999.

In 1996 the second on the list, Luis María Iriarte, resigned and left the mayor's office; and Ibero became Minister for Public Works, Transport and Communications of the Government of Navarra. He was also a councilor in Zizur Mayor for two legislatures, 1999-2003 and 2011–2015; and CDN Spokesperson in the Pamplona City Council, from where he was elected President of the Pamplona Commonwealth (2003–2007), upon receiving favorable votes from CDN and UPN.

In the municipal elections of May 2011, Ibero ran as a CDN candidate for mayor of Zizur Mayor, a town where he had previously been mayor and councilor. He was elected as councilor.

In February 2018, after retiring from the front line of politics, he announced his affiliation to the Navarrese People's Union.

Ibero, as a member of the management of the Pamplona club (June–December, 2014) had a prominent role in saving Club Atlético Osasuna from its disappearance, by registering the Rojilla entity in the Second Division and transferring the law to the Parliament of Navarre of rescue against an uncontrolled debt to the Treasury amounting to 52 million euros.

Ibero died on November 10, 2020, at the age of 71, from COVID-19.
