= Maria Lluïsa Oliveda Puig =

Spanish actress (1922–2020)

Maria Lluïsa Oliveda i Puig (Spain, 6 July 1922 – 20 June 2020) was a Spanish actress and director of Catalan theater, as well as a Women's rights activist.

== Career ==
During the 1940s, Oliveda collaborated with the Teatro Español Universitario and with amateur groups such as the Club Maria Guerrero or the Club Helena. After 1950, she joined the Teatre Studium, with Lluís Masriera. In 1957, she founded the Pequeño Teatro in Barcelona, where she staged works by Carlo Goldoni, Jorge Guillén and Arthur Schnitzler, among others. In 1973 she was in charge of the artistic direction of the Teatre Grec de Montjuïc and in 1980, she created the Teatre Experimental de Dones, with which they toured towns in Catalonia, Castellón and Valencia and won the Lisístrata Prize at the Sitges International Theater Festival. With María José Ragué and Araceli Bruch, she founded the association Teatre + dona in order to give visibility to women's creativity in the full range of theater possibilities.

Oliveda fought for the rights of women for more than thirty years, in the world of theater, and also to actively promote the incorporation of women into the cultural and social life of Catalonia through various entities, including the City Council of Barcelona (Barcelona Women's Council). She was president of the National Council of Women of Spain. She died away in Barcelona at the age of 97 on 20 June 2020.
