= José Marfil Peralta =

- Born: 9 February 1921; Rincón de la Victoria, Spain
- Died: 7 June 2018 (aged 97); Maureillas-las-Illas, France
- Military career
- Allegiance: Spanish Republican Army; French Third Republic
- Conflicts: Battle of Dunkirk

José Marfil Peralta (9 February 1921 – 7 June 2018) was a Spanish soldier, writer, and fighter in World War II.

== Biography ==
Captured during the battle of Dunkirk in which he participated as part of the French troops, he was detained together with his father, José Marfil Escalona, in the prison camp of Żagań, from which he was transferred to the Mauthausen-Gusen concentration camp on 25 January 1941, remaining there until his release, on 5 May 1945, where his father died.

As a result of his experiences as a prisoner, Marfil wrote the autobiography I survived the Nazi hell (Yo sobreviví al infierno nazi). After his release, he continued his life in French exile until his death in 2018, aged 97.
