= José María Calleja =

Spanish journalist (1955–2020)

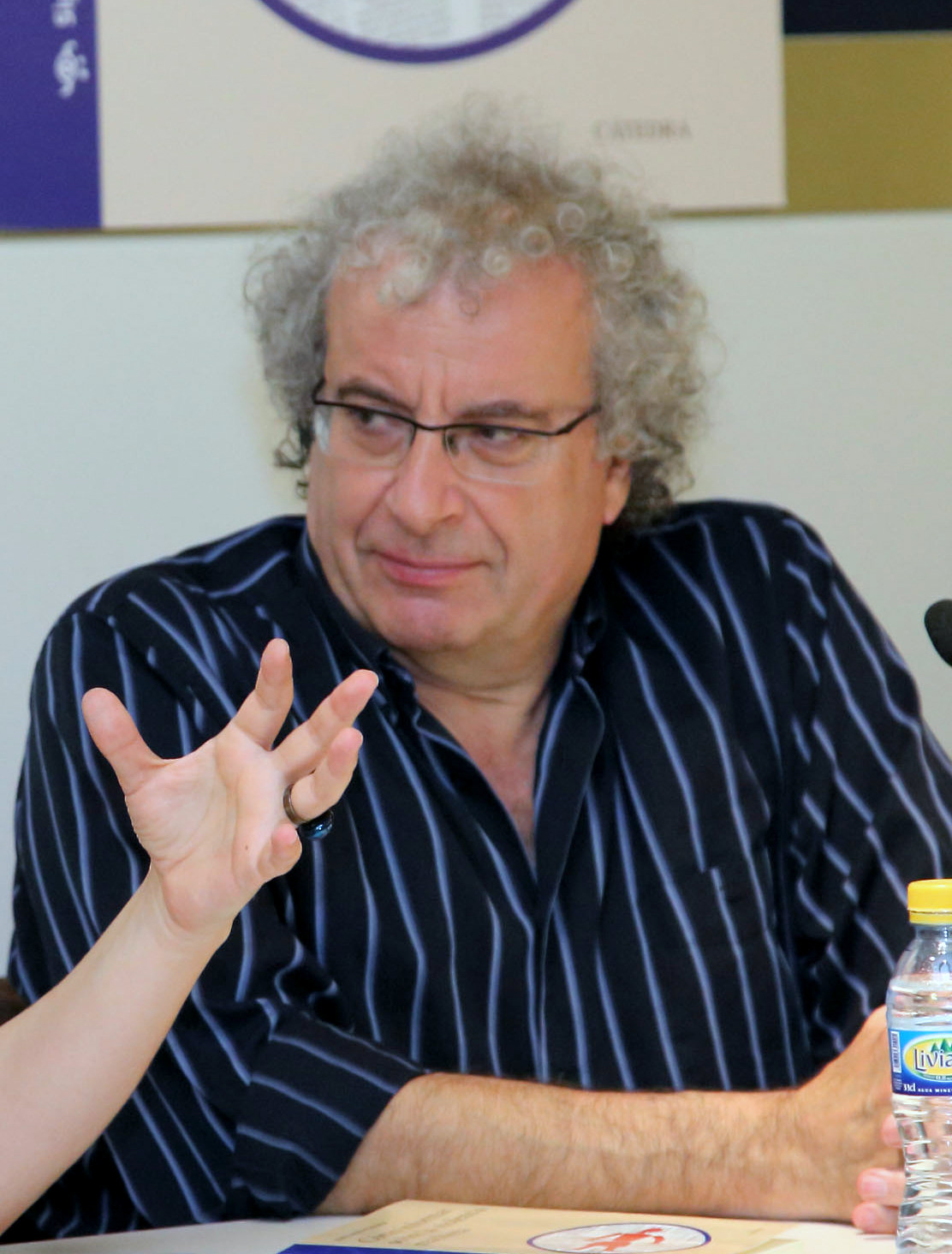
- Born: José María Fernández Calleja; 16 May 1955; Ponferrada
- Died: 21 April 2020 (aged 64); Madrid
- Occupations: Journalist and activist

José María Fernández Calleja (16 May 1955 – 21 April 2020) was a Spanish journalist, political prisoner during the Francisco Franco era and anti-ETA activist.

He was born in Ponferrada, Spain. Until the end of the ETA's activity, he had to live with bodyguards as he was under threat of death from the Basque separatist group.

Calleja died in Madrid, aged 64, after suffering from COVID-19 during the COVID-19 pandemic in Spain, on 21 April 2020.
