= Núria Gispert i Feliu =

Spanish politician (1936–2020)

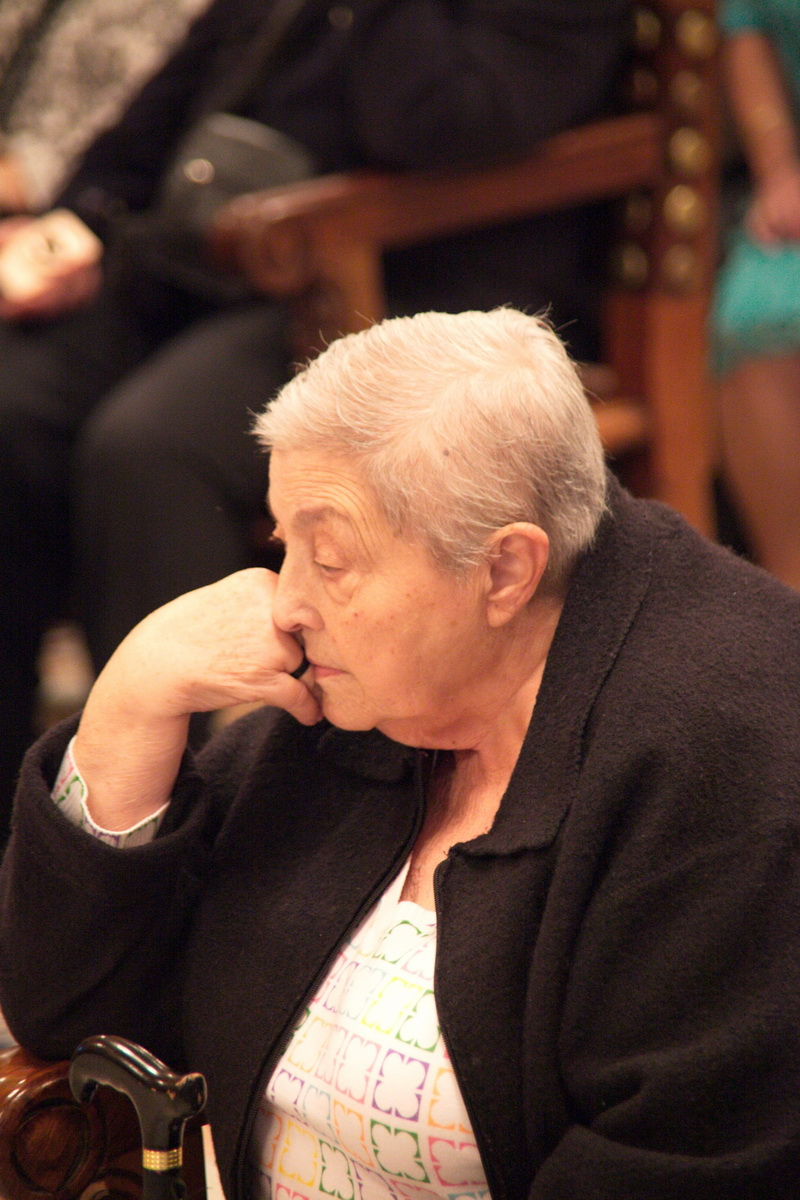

Núria Gispert i Feliu (6 June 1936 – 16 September 2020) was a Spanish politician, Catholic activist and social worker. She was born in Barcelona. She was a member of the Socialists' Party of Catalonia. Between 1979 and 1995, she was a member of the City Council of Barcelona.

Feliu died on 16 September 2020 in Barcelona of colon cancer at the age of 84.
