= Pablo Aranda (writer) =

Spanish writer (1968–2020)

Pablo Aranda Ruiz
- Born: 2 May 1978 (age 48)
- Died: 1 August 2020 (aged 52)

Pablo Aranda Ruiz (26 April 1968 – 1 August 2020) was a Spanish writer.

He was born in Málaga and studied Spanish philology at university. A tireless traveller, he worked in a number of professions, including teaching at a juvenile correctional facility and teaching Spanish at the University of Oran in Algeria.

His first novel La otra ciudad was published in 2003. It won the Premio de la Crítica Andaluza for best first novel and was also nominated for the Premio Primavera. His other works include Desprendimiento de rutina (Arguval, 2003) which won the Premio Diario Sur para Novela Corta and Ucrania (Destino, 2006) which won the Premio Málaga.

In 2012, he made his first foray into children’s literature, with his book Fede quiere ser pirata (Anaya, 2012) which won the Premio de Literatura Infantil Ciudad de Málaga. He followed up with a sequel El colegio más raro del mundo (Anaya, 2014). His last work was the novel El protegido (Malpaso, 2015).

== Selected works ==
- El protegido
- Los soldados
- Ucrania
- El orden improbable
- La otra ciudad
- Desprendimiento de rutina
