= Juli Sanclimens i Genescà =

Spanish Catalan politician (1935–2020)

Mayor of Manresa
- In office 1987–1995

Member of the Parliament of Catalonia
- In office 1984–1995
- Constituency: Barcelona

Personal details
- Born: 29 August 1935 Manresa, Catalonia, Spanish Republic
- Died: 12 June 2020 (aged 84) Manresa, Catalonia, Spain
- Party: Democratic Convergence of Catalonia

Juli Sanclimens i Genescà (29 August 1935 – 12 June 2020) was a Spanish Catalan politician and member of the now defunct Democratic Convergence of Catalonia. He served as the mayor of Manresa from 1987 until 1995 and a member of the Parliament of Catalonia from 1984 to 1995.

Sanclimens was born in Manresa on 29 August 1935. He graduated from the IESE Business School in 1958. Sanclimens joined the Democratic Convergence of Catalonia in 1976 and served on the party's National Executive Committee between 1987 and 1995.

Juli Sanclimens i Genescà died in a Manresa hospital on 12 June 2020, at the age of 84. He was survived by three children - Xavier, David and Marc.
