= Eugenio Agacino y Martínez =

Spanish sailor and writer

Eugenio Agacino y Martínez (1851–1924) was a Spanish sailor and writer. He was born in Ferrol, A Coruña in 1851, and died in Alicante on July 26, 1924. He joined the general body of the Navy and retired with the title of lieutenant commander to pursue his work in a transatlantic professional training company. He collaborated on "La Revista de la Marina" (The Magazine of the Navy).

== Works ==
Eugenio Agacino y Martínez was the author of numerous works, among which are the following:

- Cartilla de electricidad práctica (Practical Electricy manual).
- Cartilla de máquinas de vapor (Steam engine manual).
- Construcción naval mercante (Commercial shipbuilding).
- Guía práctica del marino mercante (Practical guide to the merchant marine).
- Geografía marítima (Maritime geography).
- Higiene naval (Naval Hygiene).
- Manual de telegrafía sin hilos (Manual of wireless telegraphy).
- Manual del Maquinista de la Marina mercante (Merchant Navy Machinist Manual).

He also prepared nautical tables, a navigation treaty and trigonometry books.
