= Roser Rahola d'Espona =

Spanish editor (1914–2020)

- Born: September 21, 1914; Barcelona, Spain
- Died: 22 January 2020 (aged 105); Barcelona, Spain
- Occupation: Editor
- Title: Baroness of Perpignan
- Awards: Creu de Sant Jordi 1994

Rosario Rahola d'Espona (21 September 1914 – 22 January 2020) was a Spanish editor with royal lineage.

== Biography ==
Rahola d'Espona was the daughter of the lawyer Baldiri Rahona i Llorens and cousin of the politician and member of the Regionalist League of Catalonia Pedro Rahola.

She was awarded the Creu de Sant Jordi in 1994 for her work on educative materials teaching Catalan culture. Rahola D'Espona was made Baroness of Perpignan on 9 April 2010 in a decree by Juan Carlos I of Spain.

Rahola d'Espona worked as an editor for the publisher Editions Jaume Vicens Vives. She was married to Jaume Vicencs i Vives, whom she met at the University of Barcelona in 1933. Rahola d'Espona never finished her studies at the university.

Roser Rahola d'Espona died on 22 January 2020.
