= Pep Mòdol =

Spanish politician (died 2020)

Josep Ramon Mòdol i Pifarré (died 10 July 2020) was a Spanish politician who served as a Deputy and later as a Senator.

He was born in Lleida and was a teacher at the university there.
