= Enrique Ramón Fajarnés =

Spanish lawyer and politician (1929–2020)

Enrique Ramón Fajarnés (1929 – 14 September 2020) was a Spanish lawyer and politician who served as Mayor of Ibiza, as a Senator, and as a Deputy.
