= José García Ladrón de Guevara =

Spanish poet, journalist, and politician (1929–2019)

José García Ladrón de Guevara (5 December 1929 – 3 March 2019) was a Spanish poet, journalist, and Senator.
