= José Luis García Ferrero =

Spanish politician (1929–2020)

José Luis García Ferrero (30 November 1929 – 28 July 2020) was a Spanish veterinarian and politician.

A native of Fuensalida born on 30 November 1929, García Ferrero studied veterinary science at the Complutense University of Madrid.

From February 1968, García Ferrero was deputy director in charge of preventative healthcare and hygiene for livestock, and was appointed leader of a regional laboratory affiliated with the Animal Health Center in December 1971. He was named director-general of agricultural industry in July 1976, and appointed director-general of agricultural production in March 1978. From October 1980, García Ferrero was deputy agriculture minister. Conservation was added to his portfolio in December 1981. García Ferrero was appointed head of the Ministry of Agriculture, Fisheries and Food on 13 September 1982, succeeding José Luis Álvarez, who left the Calvo-Sotelo Government for the People's Democratic Party. After the government was voted out of office, García Ferrero worked for a private agricultural company. García Ferrero's tenure as a government minister was the shortest following the Spanish transition to democracy, until Màxim Huerta's tenure in the Sánchez I Government.

García Ferrero died at the age of 90 on 28 July 2020.

== Awards ==
- Grand Cross of the Order of Merit for Agriculture, Fisheries and Food (1970)
- Grand Cross of the Order of Charles III (1982)
- Gold Medal of the Spanish College of Veterinarians (2007)
- Medal of the Order of Constitutional Merit (2011)
