= Luis Miravitlles =

Spanish writer, scientist and television presenter

- Born: Luis Miravitlles Torras; 1930; Barcelona, Spain
- Died: April 26, 1995 (aged 64–65); Spain
- Occupations: Scientist, writer

Luis Miravitlles (1930 – April 26, 1995) was a Spanish scientist and writer.
