= Juan José García Corral =

Spanish bullfighter (1952–2020)

Juan José García Corral (22 June 1952 – 15 July 2020), was a Spanish bullfighter and director of the Escuela Tauromaquia of Salamanca

== Biography ==
Garcia Corral was born in La Fuente de San Esteban, Province of Salamanca on 22 June 1952. On 11 August 1968, he took the Alternative in Manzanares, from the hands of Andrés Hernando and Gabriel de la Casa acting as a witness. The bull was called Hullero, from the Conde de Mayalde ranch, who had both ears and tail cut off. The confirmation took place in the Plaza de Las Ventas, in Madrid on 17 May 1969, at the hands of Santiago Martín El Viti, and Francisco Rivera Paquirri acted as a witness. The bull was Castañeta, from the livestock of Francisco Galache.

In 1969 he opened the large door of the Las Ventas bullring in Madrid. On 7 July 1971, as a result of a traffic accident at the height of Aranda de Duero, coming from Pamplona, he suffered serious vision problems just when he was at his best professional moment. He underwent several operations by the ophthalmologist Marín Enciso in the Sanatorium of Bullfighters of Madrid. Because of the injuries he retired as a bullfighter.

He reappeared some time later in the Haro bullring, on 1 August 1971, in a heads-up with Sebastián Palomo Linares, with bulls from the Román Sorando livestock. He cut off the first two ears, and the one who closed the square off both ears and his tail.

Later, despite his vision problems, he carried out important tasks in plazas such as Madrid and Salamanca, where he was the winner of the fair several times. From 1989 to 2013 he was director of the Salamanca Bullfighting School. From 2013 to 2020 he directed the professional career of the bullfighter Alejandro Marcos Iglesias.

He died on 15 July 2020 at the Clinical Hospital of Salamanca, due to a serious and rapid illness, which had been detected a few months earlier.
