= Elio Berhanyer =

Spanish fashion designer (1929–2019)

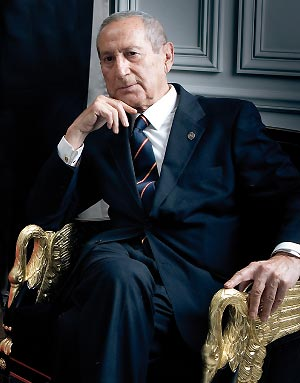
- Born: Elio Berenguer Úbeda; 20 February 1929; Córdoba, Spain
- Died: 24 January 2019 (aged 89)
- Occupation(s): Fashion designer, professor

Elio Berenguer Úbeda, known as Elio Berhanyer (20 February 1929 – 24 January 2019) was a Spanish fashion designer who gained several prizes in his career. His designs were worn by actresses such as Ava Gardner and Cyd Charisse and royals like Queen Sofía and Infanta Pilar.

== Early life ==
Berhanyer was born in Córdoba, Andalusia on 20 February 1929. His father was executed by Nationalist faction at the beginning of the Spanish Civil War. He then moved with his aunt to Seville and later with his uncle, where together with his cousin started to draw the firsts designs. At the age of 17 moved to Madrid.

== Career ==
In 1956, Berhanyer began working as a seamster. After four years of doing this, he opened up his own shop in the cities of Madrid and Barcelona. His name spread quickly and he quickly won the Cadillac House Award for being the best designer of the year. He had a collection that gained recognition in order to win this award. He had upon occasion represented Spain in the International Fashion Week. He has also designed uniforms for Iberia airline, RTVE and the hostesses for the 1982 FIFA World Cup. He taught Fashion at the University of Córdoba.

In 2013, Televisión Española presented a documentary about his career as a design teacher.

He died in Madrid on 24 January 2019 at the age of 89.

== Awards ==
- Gold Medal for Merit in Fine Arts (2002)
- National Cristóbal Balenciaga Award
- Premio Campioni (Italy)
- National Fashion Design Award (2011)
