= 2018 in Spain =

- Decades: 1990s; 2000s; 2010s; 2020s; 2030s
- See also: History of Spain; Timeline of Spanish history; List of years in Spain

Events in the year 2018 in Spain.

== Incumbents ==
- Monarch: Felipe VI
- Prime Minister: Mariano Rajoy until June 1
  Pedro Sánchez (since June 1)

=== Regional presidents ===
- Andalusia: Susana Diaz
- Aragón: Javier Lambán
- Asturias: Javier Fernandez
- Balearic Islands: Francina Armengol
- Basque Country: Iñigo Urkullu
- Canary Islands: Fernando Clavijo Batlle
- Cantabria: Miguel Ángel Revilla
- Castilla–La Mancha: Emiliano García-Page
- Castile and León: Juan Vicente Herrera
- Catalonia: Quim Torra
- Extremadura: Guillermo Fernández Vara
- Galicia: Alberto Núñez Feijóo
- La Rioja: José Ignacio Ceniceros
- Community of Madrid: Cristina Cifuentes (until 25 April), Ángel Garrido (starting 25 April)
- Region of Murcia: Fernando López Miras
- Navarre: Uxue Barkos
- Valencian Community: Ximo Puig
- Ceuta: Juan Jesús Vivas
- Melilla: Juan José Imbroda

== Events ==
- Ongoing – 2017–18 Spanish constitutional crisis
- 8 March – 2018 Spanish women's strike.
- 10 June – Human Chain for Basque Self-determination, 2018.
- 12 June – the ship Aquarius carrying 629 migrants that were rescued near Libya was denied entry to the Sicilian port by Italy's new interior minister Matteo Salvini and Malta. The Spanish government offered the Aquarius the chance to dock in the secure port of Valencia, Spain and the Italian navy offered full assistance and a marine escort for the trip.
- 4 July – the Spanish Government accepted another NGO vessel, in this case a Spanish NGO called Open Arms carrying 60 migrants after Italy and Malta rejected again open a port for the ship. The same happened two weeks later.
- 18 September – The sixth floor of the Hotel Ritz in Madrid collapses resulting in the death of one person while 11 others are injured.
- 19 September – The Mossos d'Esquadra arrests in Tarrassaa man for planning the assassination of the Prime Minister Pedro Sánchez who was, angry with the plans to exhume Franco.
- 2 December – Vox 's results in the 2018 Andalusian regional election with 12 seats and 11% of the votes signalled the first time a far-right party had won seats in a regional parliament in Spain since the country's return to democracy, following the death of longtime dictator Francisco Franco in 1975.
- 4 December – A Spanish institutional crisis surrounding the General Council of the Judiciary (CGPJ) begins.

== Deaths ==
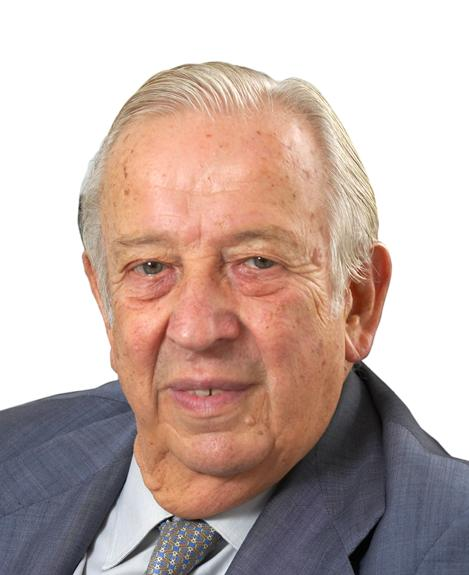
Manuel Olivencia

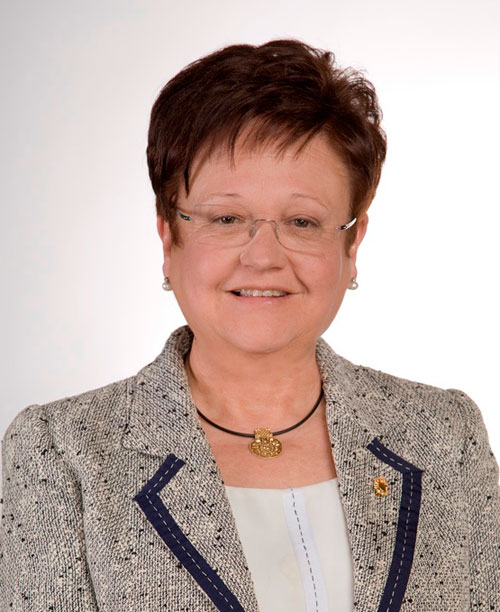
Luisa Pastor Lillo

- 1 January – Manuel Olivencia, economist and diplomat (b. 1929).
- 9 January – Victoriano Ríos Pérez, physician and politician (b. 1930)
- 14 January – Pablo García Baena, poet (b. 1921)
- 22 January – Emilio Gastón, politician, lawyer, and poet (b. 1935)
- 7 April – Ángel Peralta Pineda, rejoneador (b. 1926).
- 18 April – Luisa Pastor Lillo, politician (b. 1948)
- 24 April – Victor Garaigordóbil Berrizbeitia, Roman Catholic bishop (b. 1915)
- 1 May – Javier Aller, actor (b. 1972).
- 5 May – José María Íñigo, journalist, radio and television presenter, and stage and screen actor (b. 1942).
- 20 May – Ramón Chao, journalist (b. 1935)
- 7 June – José Marfil Peralta, soldier, writer, fighter in World War II, and Holocaust survivor (b. 1921).
