= Jaume Muxart =

Catalan painter (1922–2019)

Jaume Muxart (3 July 1922 – 8 March 2019) was a Catalan painter. He was part of the Grup Taüll of avant-garde artists.

== Early life ==
In 1947 he made his first exhibition at Sala Pictòria in Barcelona, together with Sixt Blasco, Alexandre Siches and Marc Aleu. In 1948 he participated in the National Exhibition of Fine Arts in Madrid, and traveled to Paris, with a scholarship from the School of Fine Arts.

In 1955, together with Marc Aleu, Modest Cuixart, Josep Guinovart, Jordi Mercadé, Antoni Tàpies and Joan-Josep Tharrats, they constitute the Taüll group. In 1956 he exhibited at the Museum of Modern Art in Cairo. In 1957 he exhibited at the Sala Gaspar in Barcelona and in the Gallery of the Strand Hotel in Stockholm. In 1959 he participated in the exhibition «8 Contemporany Spanish Painters» at the Ohana Gallery in London, and he participated in the V Bienal de São Paulo on behalf of Spain.

In 1964 he exhibited at the American Art Gallery in Copenhagen and at the Galerie Westing in Odense (Denmark). In 1966 he exhibited in the Exhibition Hall of the General Direction of Fine Arts (Madrid). In 1972 he exhibited at the Kreisler Gallery in Madrid and the Galleria della Babuina (Rome). In 1979 he was appointed professor at the Faculty of Fine Arts of the University of Barcelona.

In 1981 he exhibited at the Galería Dau al Set de Barcelona. In 1982 he was appointed dean of the Faculty of Fine Arts of the University of Barcelona. In 1983 he obtained a PhD in Fine Arts from the University of Barcelona. In 1984 he exhibited at the Dau Gallery in Barcelona Set. In 1988 he exhibited at the Sala Gaspar in Barcelona.

In 1990 he made the exhibition "Muxart a Van Gogh, Recreacions", in the Anna Ruiz Gallery. In 1991 he was appointed academic of the Royal Catalan Academy of Fine Arts of San Jorge. In 1992 he made the exhibition «New York Pintures» at the Anna Ruiz Gallery. In 1998 he made the exhibition "Montserrat" in the Monastery of Montserrat Museum and in the Cultural Center of Martorell.

In 2003 he exhibited «Big Bang», a series of 80 oils on canvas that are exhibited in the Monastery of San Cugat del Vallés. In 2005 came the exhibition «Anthological», in the old Rubí factory.

Muxart's work is of strong expressionist character with structured figurative motifs, and his gestures appeal to the effects and varied registers of pictorial matter.
