= Benjamín Moreno =

Spanish footballer (1955–2020)

Personal information
- Full name: Benjamín Moreno Márquez
- Date of birth: 17 April 1955
- Place of birth: Guarromán, Spain
- Date of death: 1 May 2020 (aged 65)
- Place of death: Madrid, Spain
- Position: Striker

Youth career
- Real Madrid

Senior career*
| Years | Team | Apps | (Gls) |
- Murcia
| 1978–1980 | Valdepeñas | 63 | (14) |
| 1980–1985 | Leganés | 168 | (51) |
| 1985–1986 | Móstoles | 33 | (8) |
| 1986–1987 | Fuenlabrada | 6 | (0) |
- Sonseca
| Total | | 270 | (73) |
- * Club domestic league appearances and goals

Benjamín Moreno Márquez (17 April 1955 – 1 May 2020) was a Spanish footballer who played as striker.

== Career ==
Born in Guarromán, his family emigrated to Madrid. He started playing football in Murcia and Valdepeñas. In 1980 he joined CD Leganés, then in Tercera División where he spent his best years (1980–1985). In five seasons he played 168 matches and scored 52 goals. He was the first legend of modern football in CD Leganés.

After leaving that club, he played in CD Móstoles, CF Fuenlabrada and CD Sonseca.

He worked in Metro de Madrid, where he retired. Benjamín died on 1 May 2020 in Madrid.

He is considered the first legend of modern CD Leganés.
