= José López Calo =

Spanish musicologist (1922–2020)

- Born: 4 February 1922; Porto do Son, Spain
- Died: 10 May 2020 (aged 98); Salamanca, Spain
- Occupation: Musicologist

José López Calo (4 February 1922 – 10 May 2020) was a Spanish musicologist.

== Biography ==
After studying music alongside Manuel Ansola at the Monastery of San Martiño Pinario, he subsequently earned a degree in philosophy at Comillas Pontifical University in 1949. He was ordained a priest in 1951 and graduated from the Faculty of Theology of Granada with a degree in theology in 1956.

== Awards ==
- Medalla de Oro al mérito en las Bellas Artes (1998)
- Premio das Letras e Artes de Galicia (2002)
- Premio Fernández-Latorre (2008)

== Works ==
- La música medieval en Galicia (1982)
- Las sonatas de Beethoven para piano (1986)
- La música en la Catedral de Santiago (1993)
- La música en la Catedral de Plasencia (1995)
- La música en la catedral de Burgos (1995)
- Historia de la música española (2004)
- Documentario musical de la Capilla Real de Granada (2005)
- La música en las catedrales españolas (2012)
- El miserere de Semana Santa en la Catedral de Sevilla (2015)
