= Germà Colón =

Spanish philologist (1928–2020)

- Born: Germà Colón i Doménech; November 30, 1928; Castellón de la Plana, Spain
- Died: March 22, 2020 (aged 91); Barcelona, Spain
- Occupation: Professor
- Awards: Creu de Sant Jordi

Academic background
- Education: University of Barcelona; University of Madrid
- Thesis: (1952)

Academic work
- Discipline: Philology
- Sub-discipline: Romance philology and Catalan lexicology
- Institutions: University of Basel
- Notable works: El léxico catalán en la Romania

Germà Colón i Doménech (30 November 1928 – 22 March 2020) was a Spanish philologist of Romance philology and Catalan lexicology. He was appointed a professor at the University of Basel, in Switzerland.

== Biography ==
Born on 30 November 1928 in Castellón de la Plana, Colón studied romance philology in the University of Barcelona with noted philologists such as Antoni Maria Badia i Margarit and Martí de Riquer, before graduating in 1951. He got his PhD the next year in the University of Madrid, with a thesis about dialectology (about the Castelló dialect).

Afterwards he got a grant and went to Leuven and Zurich, where he met some of the most prestigious European romanists, such as dialectologist Sever Pop (1901–1961), author of La dialectologie. The Swiss philologist Walther von Wartburg proposed him as a lecturer of Spanish in the University of Basel, where he remained. Since then, he was promoted gradually: Privat-Dozent since 1959, university teacher in 1963, and professor since 1967. After 1997, he became professor emeritus. He was at the same time a teacher at the University of Strasbourg (from 1968 to 1972) and the Autonomous University of Barcelona (1973–74).

He became a member of the Real Academia de las Buenas Letras de Barcelona and the commission for the publication of Ramon Llull's works. He joined as a member of the consultant board of the Els Nostres Clàssics collection and the editorial staff of the magazine Estudis de Llengua i Literatura Catalanes.

He had been an honorary consultant of the International Association of Catalan Language and Literature (he was president from 1976 to 1982) and member of the Institute of Catalan Studies. He received the Sanchis Guarner prize, that was given by the Jaume I Foundation (1987), the Honorary Prize of the Valencian Letters (1988), the Prat de la Riba prize (given by the) IEC (1979), the Serra d'Or prize (1981), the Creu de Sant Jordi (1985) and the Literature Prize of the Generalitat de Catalunya (1987). In 1999, he received also the Gran Cruz de Alfonso X el Sabio.

He received an honorary degree from the University of Valencia in 1984, from the University of Alicante in October 1990, from the University Jaume I of Castellón and the Autonomous University of Barcelona in January 2003. He donated his personal library (more than 20,000 volumes) to the University Jaume I of Castellón.

== Death ==
Colón died in his home in Barcelona on 22 March 2020, at the age of 91. The cause of death was reported as COVID-19, and had been suffering from respiratory problems for several years before.

== Selected works ==
- El léxico catalán en la Romania (1976).
- La llengua catalana en els seus textos (1978).
- El panorama de la lexicografia catalana (1986).
- Problemes de la llengua a València i als seus voltants (1987).
- El español y el catalán, juntos y en contraste (1989).
- Estudis de filologia catalana i romànica (1997).
- Para la historia del léxico español (2002).
- De Ramon Llull al Diccionari de Fabra. Acostament lingüístic als monuments de les lletres catalanes (2003).
