= Àngel Pla =

Spanish-born Andorran wood carver (1930–2021)

Àngel Pla (1930 –26 February 2021) was a Spanish-born Andorran wood carver specializing in traditional Catholic art and polychrome, especially the Virgin Mary. Pla operated his workshop in the old town of Andorra la Vella from 1970 until shortly before his death. Pla also owned and ran a bookshop in the 1980s. Pla was one of the few remaining professional woodcarvers and artisans working in Andorra.

== Life ==
Pla was born in Barcelona, Spain, in 1930. He was raised in France until 1936, when the family returned to Spain. Pla attended Escola de la Llotja, an arts and design school in Barcelona, while working as an apprentice, from the age of 17 until he was 20 years old.

He moved to Andorra in 1958 to accept a job offer as a craftsman in the workshop of Jaume Bordas, on Avenida Meritxell. Pla was one of a number of Spanish artists to settle in Andorra during the era, including sculptor Sergi Mas and poet Esteve Albert i Corp.

In 1970, Pla opened his landmark workshop on the Monjó Square in Andorra la Vella's Old Town. He continued to carve in his shop until shortly before his death. Pla specialized in traditional Catholic art and polychrome, especially the Virgin Mary. Notable collectors of his carvings include Peruvian writer, Mario Vargas Llosa. In addition to art, Pla owned and operated the Eureka bookshop, which opened on the Carrer de la Vall in the 1980s.

Àngel Pla died in Andorra la Vella on 26 February 2021, at the age of 91, from COVID-19 during the COVID-19 pandemic in Andorra. According to Ràdio i Televisió d'Andorra, Pla was one of the few remaining professional woodcarvers and artisans working in Andorra.
