= Ignacio Sanuy =

Spanish musicologist, journalist, lawyer, music critic and historian

Ignacio Sanuy (1925–1995) was a Spanish musicologist, journalist, lawyer, music critic and historian.
