= Jesús Vaquero =

Spanish neurosurgeon (1950–2020)

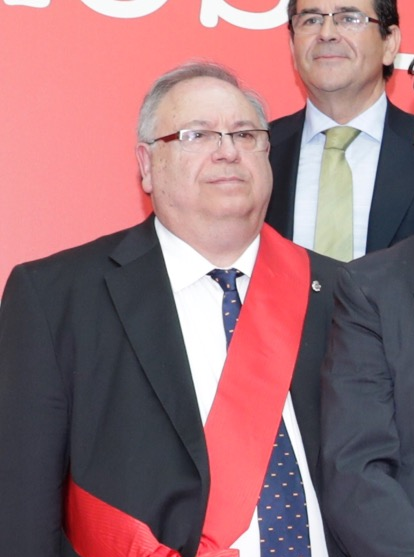
- Born: 1950; Madrid
- Died: 17 April 2020 (aged 69–70); Madrid
- Alma mater: Complutense University of Madrid
- Occupation: Professor (1993–), neurosurgeon
- Employer: Autonomous University of Madrid
- Awards: Grand Cross of the Order of the Second of May (2017)

Jesús Vaquero Crespo (1950 – 17 April 2020) was a Spanish neurosurgeon. He was a pioneer in the treatment of medullary injuries.

== Biography ==
Born in Madrid in 1950, he became chief of Neurosurgery of the Hospital Puerta de Hierro in 1992. He was also full professor of the Autonomous University of Madrid (UAM) and also held the Chair of Neuroscience of the Rafael del Pino Foundation.

He died on 17 April 2020 due to COVID-19.

== Decorations ==
- Great Cross of the Order of the Dos de Mayo (2017)
