= Manuel Costas (footballer, born 1942) =

Spanish footballer (1942–2020)

Personal information
- Full name: Manuel Costas Sanromán
- Date of birth: 8 May 1942
- Place of birth: Panxón, Spain
- Date of death: 15 December 2020 (aged 78)
- Place of death: Sevilla, Spain
- Height: 1.76 m (5 ft 9 in)
- Position: Defender

Senior career*
Years	Team	Apps	(Gls)
1963–1974	Sevilla	247	(4)
1964–1965	→ Recreativo de Huelva (loan)	16	(5)
1974–1975	Linares		
Total		263	(9)
- * Club domestic league appearances and goals

Manuel Costas Sanromán (8 May 1942 – 15 December 2020) was a Spanish professional footballer who played as a defender.

== Career ==
Born in Panxón, Costas played for Sevilla, Recreativo de Huelva and Linares.

He died on 15 December 2020, aged 78.
