= Josep Corominas i Busqueta =

Spanish politician (1939–2020)

Josep Corominas i Busqueta (24 March 1939 – 30 December 2020) was a Spanish Catalan doctor and politician who served as a Deputy between 1989 and 2000 and Grand Master of the Spain's Grand Lodge between 2002 and 2006.
