= Tinín =

Spanish matador (1946–2020)

- Born: José Manuel Inchausti Díaz; 28 October 1946; Madrid, Spain
- Died: 1 November 2020 (aged 74); Valencia, Spain
- Occupation: Matador

José Manuel Inchausti Díaz (28 October 1946 – 1 November 2020), known professionally as Tinín, was a Spanish matador.

== Biography ==
Tinín presented his first traje de luces on 31 March 1963 in Logroño. His first novillada took place on 18 July 1964. He triumphed in Seville on 8 May 1966 after cutting off three ears of bulls, and was carried off to his hotel by spectators. He participated in 80 pitted novilladas before officially becoming a matador in Madrid, with Paco Camino as his godfather and El Viti as witness in front of the Spanish Fighting Bull of the Ganadería brava of Alipio Pérez.

Despite much success, Tinín did not quite have the career he had hoped for. He retired from the ruedo in the early 1970s to open a restaurant in San Sebastián de los Reyes, then became the agent for singer Juan Manuel Serat.

Tinín returned to the ruedo on 5 May 1974, participated in 20 more bullfights, but after rarely receiving contracts, he once again retired after the 1977. In total he cut off 27 ears. He then became an empresa for matadors and novilleros. He moved to Mexico City, but returned to Spain after a few years.

Tinín died in Valencia on 1 November 2020 at the age of 74.
