= Ana Romero Reguera =

Spanish rancher and businesswoman (died 2020)

Ana Romero Reguera de Carrasco
- Born: Ana Romero Reguera; 1931/1932
- Died: 15 July 2020 (aged 88); El Puerto de Santamaría
- Occupations: Rancher, businesswoman

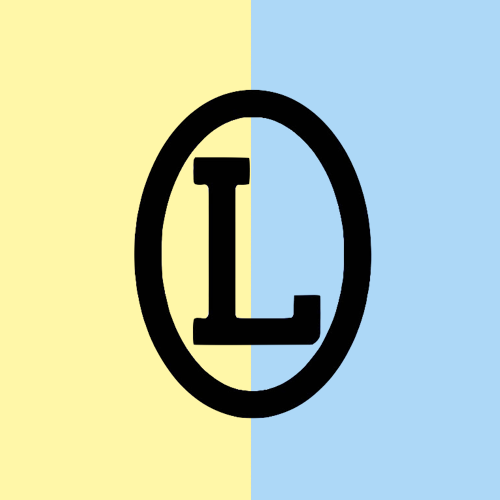
Ana Romero logo

Ana Romero Reguera de Carrasco (1931/1932 – 15 July 2020) was a Spanish rancher and businesswoman. In 1958, she and her husband, Fernando Carrasco, established a cattle ranch, known as "Ganadería Ana Romero" in Alcalá de los Gazules. Later, her son, Lucas Carrasco, helped run the ranch. Reguera was listed as "head of livestock" for the ranch and focused on developing a herd of cattle with the "Santa Colomeña" bloodline, which had a particular lineage not raised in the province. Despite this, the ranch kept with small herds to retain the purity of the breed and did not send their cattle to shows or events.

Romero Reguera de Carrasco died on 15 July 2020, aged 88.
