= Fernando Garfella Palmer =

Spanish documentary filmmaker (1989–2020)

- Born: 9 August 1989; Palma de Mallorca, Spain
- Died: 9 August 2020 (aged 31); Dragonera, Spain
- Occupation: Documentary filmmaker
- Employer(s): Bogar Films; Proactiva Open Arms

Fernando Garfella Palmer (9 August 1989 – 9 August 2020) was a Spanish documentary filmmaker, known for his documentaries about the marine life of the Balearic Islands and for his collaboration with the NGO Proactiva Open Arms.

== Biography ==
Garfella was born in Mallorca, Spain. He was the grandson of the painter Fernando Garfella and elder brother of the journalist Carlos Garfella. Growing up surrounded by the sea, he began diving in his childhood and turned it into his career over time, founding the documentary production company Bogar Films, for which he made approximately 900 dives in the Balearic Islands and their surroundings. In his documentaries he managed to capture images of endangered species such as the pearly razorfish and the long-snouted seahorse, among others.

As a documentarian and rescue worker, Garfella was associated with the NGO Proactiva Open Arms, constantly participating in the rescues of migrants from North Africa to the Spanish coasts. He was also one of the originators and promoters of the Dragonera marine reserve and frequently collaborated with Mallorca Blue, an online platform dedicated to denouncing attacks on the marine environment in the Balearic Islands.

=== Disappearance and death ===
While making one of his regular dives near Dragonera on 9 August 2020, Garfella was swept away by a strong current at a depth of over 80 metres (260 ft). His girlfriend, seeing that he did not surface, alerted a fellow diver, who tried unsuccessfully to rescue Garfella but suffered decompression sickness and had to be rushed by ambulance to the Juaneda Clinic in Palma de Mallorca. The Underwater Activities Special Group (Grupo Especial de Actividades Subacuáticas) of the Civil Guard initiated an exhaustive search for Garfella's body. On 11 August 2020, Garfella's body was recovered by GEAS at a depth of 92 metres (302 ft). The body was transported to the Port of Sóller.
