= Serafín Rojo =

Spanish cartoonist and painter (1925 - 2003)

Serafín Rojo Caamaño, el marqués de Serafín (Madrid, 1925 - 4 June 2003) was a Spanish cartoon humorist and painter.

Due to the Spanish Civil War, he travelled to Valencia, where he became interested in drawing. In 1941, he published his first comic. In 1943, he joined the publishing house Editorial Valenciana, collaborating on magazines such as Jaimito, S.O.S., Mariló and Pumby. Later he worked regularly in the weekly magazine La Codorniz where he created about 1958 his popular marchionesses, depicted as voluptuous wine drinkers. Serafín signed his work as el marqués de Serafín.

After the disappearance of La Codorniz in 1978, Serafín spent his time in oil and watercolor painting. Serafín also illustrated several satirical books such as Las nobles brutas, Carmen Underground and ¡Luz y Pornógrafos!. In 1983, his friends from the Brotherhood of Good Humor (there were Antonio Mingote, Martínmorales, the lamented Chumy, Forges...) honored him at the Velázquez Palace. In 1990, he collaborated in the revival of La Codorniz, La Golondriz. On June 4, 2003, he died in Madrid at the age of 77.
