= Pancracio Celdrán =

Spanish professor, intellectual, and journalist (1942–2019)

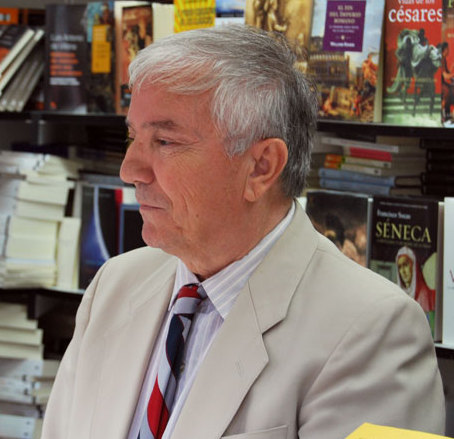
Celdrán at the 2009 Madrid Book Fair

Pancracio Celdrán Gomáriz (1942 – 24 March 2019) was a Spanish professor, intellectual and journalist whose specialties were the history and literature of antiquity and the medieval period.

== Early life and education ==
Born in Murcia, Celdrán received a degree in Hispanic literature and a doctorate in philosophy and letters from the Universidad Complutense de Madrid; a master's degree in comparative history; and has also received degrees in middle eastern history, English literature, comparative literature, and Hebrew language and culture.

== Career ==
Celdrán's academic activities took him to various universities in the United States (notably the University of California, Berkeley), in Europe, and in Israel (namely at the University of Haifa, the Hebrew University of Jerusalem, and Ben-Gurion University of the Negev). He was also a guest professor at the International Lebanese University in Beirut. Lebanon.

Though Celdrán worked occasionally in print and on television, his journalistic activities were chiefly in the medium of radio, where he has worked as a writer, executive producer, and special correspondent. He has also participated in radio tertulias (in effect, panel discussions). He was a contributor to No es un día cualquiera ("It's Not Just Another Day"), a weekend news magazine broadcast by Radio Nacional de España, and the resident linguistic consultant of El Semanal, the Sunday supplement published by the Grupo Vocento. However the prestige that this tribunes could provide him, Celdrán was critically reviewed as denigratory to non-standard speakers and other political, religious and sexual positions different from his.

In addition to many books, Celdrán contributed material to Raíces ("Roots"), a cultural review of the Jewish community in Spain.

== Death ==
Celdrán died on 24 March 2019 in Madrid, at the age of 77.

== Relevance ==
His Diccionario de topónimos españoles y sus gentilicios [Dictionary of Spanish Toponyms and Demonyms] (2002) has been chosen by the Spanish Wikipedia as a final source of authority on Spanish toponyms, both for terms still in use and for traditional names which have already fallen out of use.

== Bibliography ==
- Inventario general de insultos, "General Inventory of Insults", 1995. ISBN 84-7838-730-7.
- Libro de los elogios, "Book of Praises", 1996. ISBN 84-7838-776-5.
- Plazas y plazuelas de Madrid, "Malls and Squares of Madrid", 1998, ISBN 84-922664-9-X
- Madrid se escribe con "M" de mujer: callejero femenino de Madrid, "Madrid is Spelled with the 'M' of Mujer: a Feminine Street Guide to Madrid", 1999. ISBN 84-95242-03-6
- Creencias populares: (costumbres, manías y rarezas: con su explicación, historia y origen), "Popular Beliefs (Customs, Crazes, and Oddities: with their Explanations, Histories, and Origins), 2000. ISBN 84-8403-679-0
- Anecdotario histórico: (tres mil años de anécdotas), "Historical Anecdotary: (Three Thousand Years of Anecdotes)", 2000. ISBN 84-8403-680-4.
- El amor y la vida material en la Grecia clásica, "Love and Material Life in Classical Greece", 2001. ISBN 84-7882-463-4.
- Diccionario de topónimos españoles y sus gentilicios, "Dictionary of Spanish Toponyms and Demonyms", 2002. ISBN 84-670-0146-1.
- Red de Juderías de España: caminos de Sefarad, "The Web of Spanish Jewry: Paths of Sepharad", 2005. ISBN 84-95242-40-0.
- Hablar con corrección: normas, dudas y curiosidades de la lengua española, "Properly Speaking: Norms, Common Errors, and Curiosities of the Spanish Tongue", 2006. ISBN 84-8460-591-4.
- El gran libro de los insultos, "The Big Book of Insults", 2008, ISBN 978-84-9734-734-1.
- Hablar bien no cuesta tanto, "It Doesn't Cost All That Much To Speak Well", 2009, ISBN 978-84-8460-764-9.
- El gran libro de la historia de las cosas, "The Big Book of the History of Things", 2009, ISBN 978-84-9734-843-0
- Refranes de nuestra vida, "Sayings of Our Life", 2009, ISBN 978-84-92819-04-1
