= 2022 in Spain =

- Decades: 2000s; 2010s; 2020s; 2030s
- See also: History of Spain; Timeline of Spanish history; List of years in Spain

Events in the year 2022 in Spain.

== Incumbents ==
- Monarch: Felipe VI
- Prime Minister: Pedro Sánchez
- President of the Congress of Deputies: Meritxell Batet
- President of the Senate of Spain: Ander Gil
- President of the Supreme Court: Carlos Lesmes
- President of the Constitutional Court: Pedro González-Trevijano
- Attorney General: Dolores Delgado
- Chief of the Defence Staff: Teodoro Esteban López Calderón
- Sánchez II Government

=== Regional presidents ===
- Andalusia: Juan Manuel Moreno Bonilla
- Aragón: Javier Lambán
- Asturias: Adrián Barbón
- Balearic Islands: Francina Armengol
- Basque Country: Iñigo Urkullu
- Canary Islands: Ángel Víctor Torres
- Cantabria: Miguel Ángel Revilla
- Castilla–La Mancha: Emiliano García-Page
- Castile and León: Alfonso Fernández Mañueco
- Catalonia: Pere Aragonès
- Extremadura: Guillermo Fernández Vara
- Galicia: Alberto Núñez Feijóo
- La Rioja: Concha Andreu
- Community of Madrid: Isabel Díaz Ayuso
- Region of Murcia: Fernando López Miras
- Navarre: María Chivite
- Valencian Community: Ximo Puig
- Ceuta: Juan Jesús Vivas
- Melilla: Eduardo de Castro

== Events ==
Ongoing — COVID-19 pandemic in Spain (Until 1 August)

=== January ===
- 5 January – Sara Alba is dismissed as Minister of Health of La Rioja in the Government of Concha Andreu.
- 19 January – Six people are killed in a fire at a nursing home in Moncada, Valencia.

=== February ===
- 13 February - The far-right Vox party comes third in the 2022 Castilian-Leonese regional election, raising its representation from 1 up to 13 seats, and becoming the key player for the rival People's Party (PP), who won the elections, to form a government. Following this election result, and an unfolding leadership crisis in PP, Vox for the first time was recognized as the Spain's second political force, according to some opinion polls for the next general elections.

=== March ===
- 10 March - Vox forms a government with the People's Party in Castile and León, taking three of ten ministerial positions including vice president for regional leader Juan García-Gallardo. This is the first time that Vox forms a part of a government in Spain and the first time that a far-right party is in government since the 1970s. Vox member Carlos Pollán was elected President of the Cortes of Castile and León, the position of speaker.

=== May ===
- 6 May - 2022 Madrid explosion: Two people are killed and eighteen others are injured after a gas leak-caused explosion in Madrid.

=== June ===
- 13 June - Vila-seca train crash
- 28–30 June - 2022 NATO Madrid summit

=== August ===
- 1 August - Spain is alongside Portugal who both transition to the endemic phase.

=== October ===
- 16 October - At least seven people are injured in a suspected gas explosion at a Japanese restaurant in Tarragona, Spain.

== Deaths ==
- 16 July – Carlos Pérez de Bricio, Spanish businessman and politician (born 1927)
- 10 August – Trinidad Falcés, transgender activist (born 1942)
