= Mauro Varela =

Spanish banker (1941–2020)

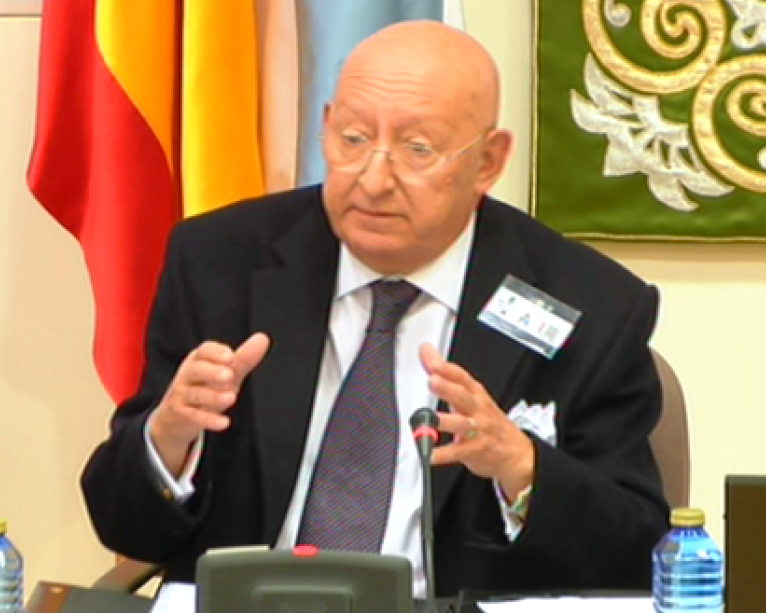

Mauro Varela (1941 – 30 January 2020) was a Spanish banker, lawyer and politician who served as a deputy (1989–2000) and as a member of the Parliament of Galicia.
