= Francisco Olivencia =

Spanish lawyer and politician (1934–2019)

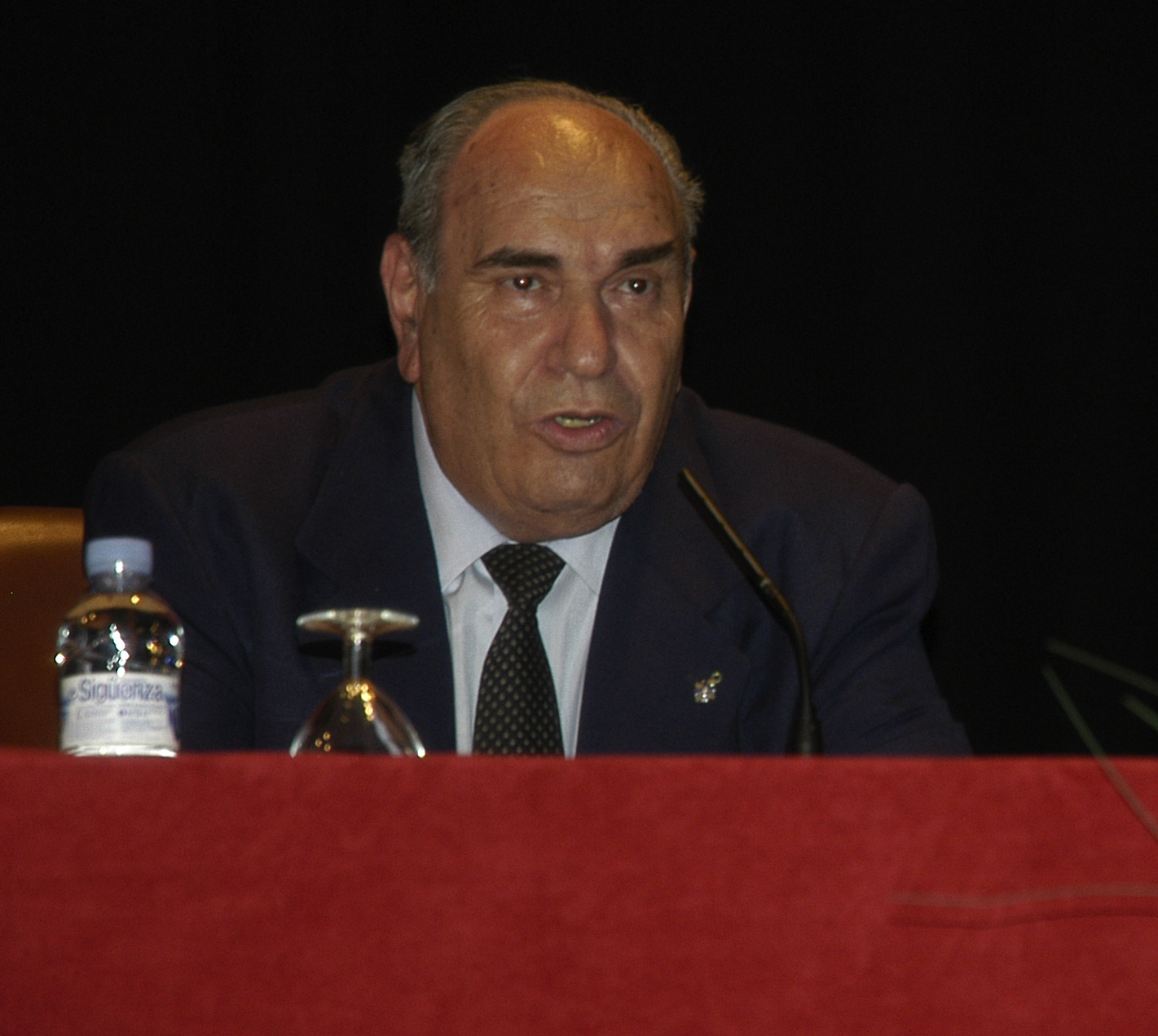

Francisco Olivencia Ruiz (12 February 1934 – 4 January 2019) was a Spanish lawyer and politician.

== Early life ==
Francisco Olivencia was born in Ceuta and studied law at the Complutense University of Madrid. His brother was Manuel Olivencia.

Olivencia's political career began in the 1960s, when he was elected to the Ceuta municipal council. He served on the first Congress of Deputies between 1979 and 1982 as a member of the Union of the Democratic Centre, witnessing the attempted coup d'état of 23 February 1981. He later sat in the Senate between 1993 and 2000, affiliated with the People's Party. Between 2003 and 2007, Olivencia was a member of the Assembly of Ceuta. In January 2017, Olivencia was awarded the distinguished cross, first class of the Order of St. Raymond of Peñafort. He died on 4 January 2019, at the University of Ceuta Hospital.
