= Zuriñe del Cerro =

Spanish feminist (1956–2020)

- Born: 10 January 1956; Ribera de Deusto, Bilbao, Spain
- Died: 28 June 2020 (aged 64); Bilbao, Spain
- Occupation: Feminist

Zuriñe del Cerro (10 January 1956 – 28 June 2020) was a Spanish feminist activist. She began by joining the Women's Assembly of Bizkaia, then the feminist collective Lanbroa. She was a political candidate in the 1990s for the European Parliament for the Confederación de Organizaciones Feministas (Partido Feminista de España, Partit Feminista de Catalunya y Alternativa Politica de Euskal Herria) party. Later, she supported the Euskal Herriko Mugimendu Abolizionista (EHMA), whose goal is to abolish prostitution, pornography, and paid birth surrogacy.

Del Cerro died on 28 June 2020, aged 64, from cancer.
