= Juan Cotino =

Spanish entrepreneur and politician (1950–2020)

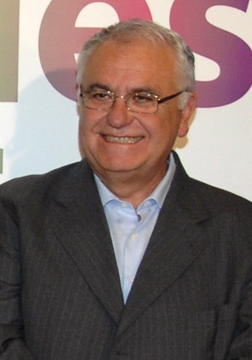

President of Corts Valencianes
- In office 9 June 2011 – 13 October 2014
- Preceded by: Milagrosa Martínez
- Succeeded by: Alejandro Font de Mora Turón

Spanish Deputy of the Corts Valencianes
- In office 27 May 2007 – 13 October 2014

Personal details
- Born: Juan Gabriel Cotino Ferrer; 26 January 1950 Xirivella, Valencian Community, Spain
- Died: 13 April 2020 (aged 70) Manises, Valencian Community, Spain
- Party: People's Party
- Occupation: Politician

Juan Gabriel Cotino Ferrer (26 January 1950 – 13 April 2020) was a Spanish entrepreneur and politician.

== Early life ==
He was born in Xirivella, Valencia. Coming from a family of agricultural entrepreneurs, he was one of the founders of the Valencian Association of Farmers. In 1976, he joined the UCD, becoming part of the Popular Democratic Party and later the Popular Party. In 1991, he was elected councilman in the City of Valencia, to the position of deputy mayor, being reelected in 1995.

== Political career ==
In 1996, he was named general director of the Police, a position he held until 2002 when he was appointed Government Delegate in the Valencian Community. After the defeat of the Popular Party in the general elections of 2004, he was removed from his position as a delegate of the Government, joining to the Generalidad Valenciana like advisor of Agriculture, Fishing and Food. In 2007, he was named third vice-president of the Valencian Community and counselor of Social Welfare, a portfolio that changes by Environment in 2009, maintaining the vice-presidency. After the elections of May 22, 2011, he was appointed President of the Corts Valencianes.

== Judicial cases ==
=== Gürtel case ===
One of the witnesses to the case places Cotino as a "factotum" of the organization of Pope Benedict XVI's visit to Valencia in 2006. For this event, several of the companies related to the Gürtel case obtained concessions in an allegedly irregular way for the organization of acts related to the visit of the pontiff. On 29 November 2018 the judge of the separate piece imputed Cotino and Francisco Camps. The last time he declared as an accused before his death was on 12 March 2020, where he flatly denied his participation in the decisions to award companies contracts for the pope's visit.

On 10 November 2014, he was finally charged by the Superior Court of Justice of the Valencian Community in the separate piece of the Gürtel case that investigated the alleged irregular hiring of Radiotelevisió Valenciana to cover the papal visit and the commission of the alleged crimes of perverting the course of justice and bribery. The imminence of this imputation forced Cotino to abandon politics and all the charges he held on 13 October 2014.

== Personal life ==
Cotino was a member of Opus Dei.

On 23 March 2020 he was admitted to an intensive care unit in Manises after testing positive for coronavirus during COVID-19 pandemic in Spain. Cotino died on 13 April 2020 at the age of 70 of complications from COVID-19.
