= Manuel Olivencia =

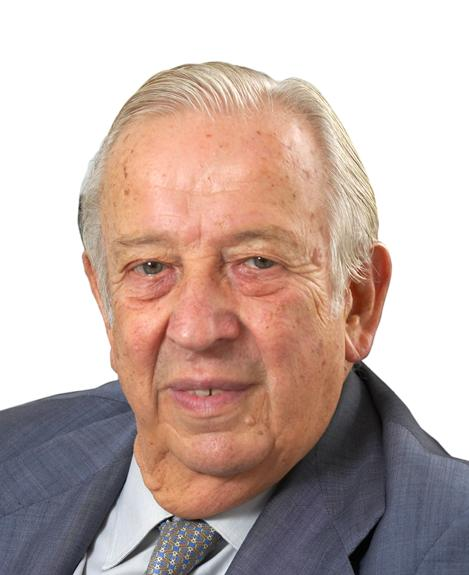
- Olivencia in 2006
- Born: Manuel Olivencia Ruiz; 25 July 1929; Ronda, Spain
- Died: 1 January 2018 (aged 88); Seville, Spain
- Education: University of Bologna
- Occupations: Lawyer, professor
- Awards: Creu de Sant Jordi Award (1990)

Manuel Olivencia Ruiz (25 July 1929 – 1 January 2018) was a Spanish lawyer with a career as a professor, economist, and diplomat. He worked at the University of Seville and organized Seville Expo '92.

== Early life ==
Olivencia was born in Ronda, Province of Málaga, on 25 July 1929 and grew up in Ceuta. Olivencia's father was also a lawyer. His brother was Francisco Olivencia. Olivencia graduated cum laude from the University of Bologna in 1953.

== Career ==
Olivencia decided from a young age to practice law, though he prioritized teaching. He became an associate professor of commercial law at the Complutense University of Madrid. In 1960 he became a professor of commercial law at the University of Seville; one of his students was Felipe González. There, he was dean of the school of law from 1968 to 1971 and dean of the school of economics from 1971 to 1975.

He was Undersecretary of Education and Science during the first Transition government, advisor to the Bank of Spain, and a member of the board of RTVE. He was Commissioner General of the 1992 Universal Exposition of Seville (Expo '92) from 1984 to 1991. Olivencia said that a major problem in putting on the event was the amount of time to prepare. On 19 April 1990 terrorist group ETA sent him a letter bomb, but exploded before in the hands of an Expo's civil servant.

He received the Creu de Sant Jordi Award for his work on Expo '92 and joined the Royal Academy of Jurisprudence and Legislation in 2005. Juan Ignacio Zoido awarded Olivencia with a Plaza de España "for a life dedicated to public service" in December 2017.

In 1998, he chaired the commission that drafted the corporate governance code for voluntary adaptation by listed companies, known as Olivencia Code, being the first of these characteristics in Spain. Olivencia served as a director of Bolsas and Mercados Españoles from June 5, 2006 until his death and also served as its lead independent director.

Olivencia was honored in 2012 with the title as the "Adoptive Son" of Seville for his contributions to Expo '92, alongside Emilio Cassinello, as they served as major contributors to Seville's cultural regions.

In his career, Olivencia published more than 200 titles of the various specialties of mercantile law, most of them collected in legal studies, five volumes which published for El Monte Foundation in Seville.

== Death ==
Olivencia died on 1 January 2018 at age 88 in Seville from respiratory failure after a suffering a fall in December 2017. Olivencia had four children, one of whom predeceased him in 2014.

== Honors ==
- Great Crosses of the Order of Alfonso X the Wise, of the Military Merit, of St. Raymond of Peñafort and of Isabella the Catholic
- Golden Cross of Merit of Austria
- Creu de Sant Jordi Award of Catalonia
- Favorite Son of Ronda
- Adoptive Son of Seville
- Gold Medal of the City of Ceuta
