= 2021 in Spain =

- Decades: 2000s; 2010s; 2020s; 2030s
- See also: History of Spain; Timeline of Spanish history; List of years in Spain

Events in the year 2021 in Spain.

== Incumbents ==
- Monarch: Felipe VI
- Prime Minister: Pedro Sánchez
- President of the Congress of Deputies: Meritxell Batet
- President of the Senate of Spain: Pilar Llop
- President of the Supreme Court: Carlos Lesmes
- President of the Constitutional Court: Juan José González Rivas
- Attorney General: Dolores Delgado
- Chief of the Defence Staff:
  - Miguel Ángel Villarroya Vilalta (until 27 January)
  - Teodoro Esteban López Calderón (since 27 January)
- President of the Episcopal Conference: Juan José Omella
- Sánchez II Government

=== Regional presidents ===
- Andalusia: Juan Manuel Moreno Bonilla
- Aragón: Javier Lambán
- Asturias: Adrián Barbón
- Balearic Islands: Francina Armengol
- Basque Country: Iñigo Urkullu
- Canary Islands: Ángel Víctor Torres
- Cantabria: Miguel Ángel Revilla
- Castilla–La Mancha: Emiliano García-Page
- Castile and León: Alfonso Fernández Mañueco
- Catalonia: Pere Aragonès
- Extremadura: Guillermo Fernández Vara
- Galicia: Alberto Núñez Feijóo
- La Rioja: Concha Andreu
- Community of Madrid: Isabel Díaz Ayuso
- Region of Murcia: Fernando López Miras
- Navarre: María Chivite
- Valencian Community: Ximo Puig
- Ceuta: Juan Jesús Vivas
- Melilla: Eduardo de Castro

== Events ==
Ongoing — COVID-19 pandemic in Spain

- 7-15 January - One of the worst snowstorm in Spain's history brings historic snow in the peninsula
- 20 January - Explosion in central Madrid kills 4 people after a suspected gas leak
- 16 February - Protests erupt due to the arrest of Spanish rapper Pablo Hasél for glorifying terrorism.
- 18 March - Spanish Congress of Deputies passes the euthanasia law.
- 5 May - Conservative party wins regional elections in Madrid. On the same day, Pablo Iglesias, until then leader of the Unidas Podemos coalition and former Second Deputy Prime Minister of Spain, announces his retirement from politics.
- 8 May - Celebrations throughout the country as Spain's six-month long state of emergency imposed due to the COVID-19 pandemic ends.
- 17 May - Conflict between Spain and Morocco following the latter relaxing its controls over the frontier between the two countries and allowing more than five thousand Moroccan citizens and migrants (including more than 1,500 minors) to get through the Spanish city of Ceuta by passing around the jetties of Benzú and El Tarajal. Moroccan Ambassador warned that "there are acts that have consequences and must be assumed" (in reference to Ghani being treated in Spain) just before being recalled by the Makhzen on 18 June, in turn shortly after she was summoned by the Spanish foreign minister (Further information: Contemporary Morocco–Spain relations)
- 21 May - Pere Aragonès is elected President of Catalonia with the support of the center-right Junts and the far-left CUP.
- 18 June - Isabel Díaz Ayuso is reelected President of the Community of Madrid with the support of the far-right Vox.
- 22 June - Spanish government grants the pardon to the political leaders of the procés.
- 23 June - Anglo-American computer programmer John McAfee dies in a jail cell near Barcelona awaiting extradition to the United States on tax charges.
- 25 June - Euthanasia becomes legal in Spain, becoming the sixth nation to do so worldwide.
- 26 June - Facemasks are no longer required outdoors countrywide.
- 10 July - Change of ministers in the second government of Pedro Sánchez.
- 27 August - Spain puts an end to the rescue mission in Afghanistan following the 2021 Taliban offensive.
- 31 August - 70% of the Spanish population is fully vaccinated against COVID-19.
- 19 September – The Cumbre Vieja volcano, one of the most active volcanoes in the Canary Islands erupts, resulting in evacuations in the surrounding area.

== Deaths ==
- 27 January - Adrián Campos, Formula One driver (b. 1960)
- 26 February - Àngel Pla, Spanish-born Andorran woodcarver (b. 1930)
- 1 March - Enrique "Quique" San Francisco, humorist (b. 1955)
- 2 March - Àlex Casademunt, singer (b. 1981)
- 18 March - Picanyol, comic artist (b. 1948)
- 28 April - El Risitas, comedian and actor (b. 1956)
- 9 May - José Manuel Caballero Bonald, Spanish poet and novelist (b. 1926)
- 23 June - Mila Ximénez, TV personality, journalist and writer (b. 1952)
- 17 July - Pilar Bardem, actress (b. 1939)
- 8 September - Jordi Rebellón, actor (b. 1957)
- 11 September - María Mendiola, singer, former member of Baccara (b. 1952)
