= 2003 in Spanish television =

This is a list of Spanish television related events in 2003.

== Events ==
- 8 April: Telecinco cameraman, José Couso, dies while covering the War of Iraq.
- 1 May: Telefónica sells to Grupo Planeta 25% of the shares of Antena 3, which makes him the reference shareholder of the channel.
- 16 June: José Manuel Lara Bosch and Maurizio Carlotti are appointed chairman and CEO, respectively, of Antena 3.
- 21 July:
  - The merger of the digital platforms Canal Satélite Digital and Vía Digital gives rise to a single platform in Spain: Digital+.
  - Television channels Canal+ Deporte 1 (later known as Canal+ Futbol and MoviStar Futbol) and DCine Espanol (later known as Movistar Cine Espanol and Cine Espanol por Movistar Plus+) starts broadcasting.
  - Television channel Beca TV stops broadcasting.
- 23 July: The National Court issues a ruling convicting Televisión Española for violating the fundamental rights to strike and freedom of association during the news coverage of the general strike of 20 June 2002.
- 29 October: Antena 3 goes public to the Spanish Stock Exchange.
- 15 November: Spain enters the inaugural Junior Eurovision Song Contest with "Desde el cielo" performed by 12-year-old Sergio Jesús García.

== Debuts ==
Title	Channel	Debut	Performers/Host	Genre
7 días, 7 noches	Antena 3	2003-09-11	Pedro Piqueras	News Magazine
A corazón abierto	Telecinco	2003-01-23	Jordi González	Gossip Show
Aquí hay tomate	Telecinco	2003-03-24	Jorge Javier Vázquez	Gossip Show
Aquí no hay quien viva	Antena 3	2003-09-07	María Adánez	Sitcom
Buenas noticias TV	La 2	2003-10-05		Religion
Código fuego	Antena 3	2003-01-15	José Coronado	Drama Series
Crónicas mix	Telecinco	2003-11-21	Javier Sardà	Late Night
Destino Eurovisión	TVE-1	2003-04-01	Carlos Lozano	Music
Doble y más	Antena 3	2003-02-28	Mar Saura	Quiz Show
Domingo de pecado	Telecinco	2003-02-04		Comedy
¿Dónde estás corazón?	Antena 3	2003-07-04	Jaime Cantizano	Talk Show
El día que vivimos peligrosamente	TVE-1	2003-06-24		Reportajes
El Diario de...verano	Antena 3	2003-07-14	Yolanda Vázquez	Talk show
El Pantano	Antena 3	2003-04-22	Natalia Verbeke	Drama Series
El programa de los lunes	TVE-1	2003-03-03	Jennifer Rope	Music
El retorno de Omaita	TVE-1	2003-04-04	Los Morancos	Comedy
El verano ya llegó	TVE-1	2003-07-08	Paloma Lago	Variety Show
En la frontera de la realidad	Antena 3	2003-01-27	Mon Santiso	News Magazine
En verde	La 2	2003-11-05	Adela Cantalapiedra	Science/Culture
Eurojunior	TVE-1	2003-09-08	Carlos Lozano	Music
Futuro	La 2	2003-07-13		Science/Culture
Homo Zapping	Antena 3	2003-12-09	José Corbacho	Comedy
Hotel Glam	Telecinco	2003-03-06	Jesús Vázquez	Reality show
Islam hoy	La 2	2003-10-05		Religion
Jimanji kanana	TVE-1	2003-06-08	Rosa García Caro	Quiz Show
La isla de los famosos	Antena 3	2003-01-23	Paula Vázquez	Reality show
La noche de los tramposos	Antena 3	2003-04-04	Inma del Moral	Comedy
La quinta esfera	Telecinco	2003-05-26	Jorge Fernández	Quiz Show
La Respuesta	Antena 3	2003-09-01	Javier González Ferrari	Talk Show
La vida de Rita	TVE-1	2003-01-07	Verónica Forqué	Drama Series
Llama y gana	Antena 3	2003-04-22	Mar Saura	Quiz Show
London Street	Antena 3	2003-01-07	Fernando Ramallo	Sitcom
Los Lunnis	La 2	2003-09-15	Lucrecia	Children
Los Serrano	Telecinco	2003-04-22	Antonio Resines	Sitcom
Luna negra	TVE-1	2003-09-29	Lorena Bernal	Soap Opera
+ Te vale XXL	Canal +	2003-10-24	Javier Coronas	Comedy
Max clan	Telecinco	2003-09-06	Daniel Diges	Children
Menta y chocolate	Antena 3	2003-07-14	Patricia Gaztañaga	Talk Show
Mi planeta	TVE-1	2003-02-02	Óscar Martínez	Quiz Show
Nadie es perfecto	Telecinco	2003-01-20	Jesús Vázquez	Talk show
Odiseas digitales	TVE-1	2003-12-01		Science/Culture
One on one	Telecinco	2003-05-06		Variety Show
Padres en apuros	La 2	2003-10-27	Belinda Washington	Science/Culture
Pillados	Telecinco	2003-07-24	Luis Cao	Comedy
Planeta Encantado	TVE-1	2003-10-04	J.J. Benítez	Documentary
Rec	Telecinco	2003-09-12	Jordi González	News Magazine
Shalom	La 2	2003-10-05		Religion
Sin noticias de...	Antena 3	2003-02-05	Carmen Baños	Public Service
Todos con la copla	TVE-1	2003-08-08	José Manuel Parada	Music
Tres son multitud	Telecinco	2003-07-07	Jaime Blanch	Sitcom
Un domingo cualquiera	TVE-1	2003-11-02	Ramón García	Variety Show
Un lugar en el mundo	Antena 3	2003-04-06	Ginés García Millán	Drama Series
Una nueva vida	Telecinco	2003-03-04	Nieve de Medina	Drama Series
Verano 3	Antena 3	2003-07-13	Andoni Ferreño	Variety Show
Vivo cantando	Telecinco	2003-06-23	Jesús Vázquez	Talent Show
X ti	Antena 3	2003-03-03	Paula Vázquez	Dating show
¡Ya es viernes!... ¿O no?	Antena 3	2003-01-23	Javier Capitán	Comedy

== Television shows ==
- La 1
  - Telediario (1957– )
  - Estudio estadio (1972–2005)
  - Informe Semanal (1973– )
  - Parlamento (1978–2014)
  - Telepasión española (1990– )
  - Corazón, Corazón (1993–2010)
  - Cartelera (1994–2009)
  - Los Desayunos de TVE (1994–2020)
  - Cine de barrio (1995– )
  - El Grand Prix del verano (1995–2005)
  - Gente (1995–2011)
  - Corazón (1997– )
  - Música sí (1997–2004)
  - Saber vivir (1997–2009)
  - Noche de fiesta (1999–2004)
  - Cruz y raya.com (2000–2004)
  - El Conciertazo (2000–2009)
  - Cuéntame cómo pasó (2001– )
  - Esta es mi historia (2001–2004)
  - Operación triunfo (2001–2004)
  - Cerca de ti (2002–2004)
  - El rival más débil (2002–2004)
  - Ana y los siete (2002–2005)
  - Por la mañana (2002–2008)
- Antena 3
  - Antena 3 Noticias (1990– )
  - En buenas manos (1994–2005)
  - Club Megatrix (1995–2013)
  - Espejo público (1996– )
  - Sabor a ti (1998–2004)
  - Noche de impacto (1998–2005)
  - Como la vida (1999–2004)
  - El club de la comedia (1999–2005)
  - Ahora (2000–2006)
  - Pasapalabra (2000–2006)
  - El Diario de Patricia (2001–2008)
  - Hay una carta para ti (2002–2004)
  - Un paso adelante (2002–2005)
- La 2
  - Al filo de lo imposble (1982– )
  - Pueblo de Dios (1982– )
  - Últimas preguntas (1983– )
  - En portada (1984– )
  - Estadio 2 (1984–2007)
  - Metrópolis (1985– )
  - Documentos TV (1986– )
  - Tendido cero (1986– )
  - Días de cine (1991– )
  - Línea 900 (1991–2007)
  - La Aventura del saber (1992– )
  - Jara y sedal (1992– )
  - Zona ACB (1993–2010)
  - Bricomanía (1994–2004)
  - La 2 noticias (1994–2020)
  - La noche temática, (1995– )
  - ¡Qué grande es el cine! (1995–2005)
  - Redes (1996–2013)
  - Agrosfera (1997– )
  - El escarabajo verde (1997– )
  - Saber y ganar (1997– )
  - América total (1997–2004)
  - A su salud (1997–2004)
  - Negro sobre blanco (1997–2004)
  - Noche abierta, La (1997–2004)
  - El Tercer grado (1997–2004)
  - La Botica de la abuela (1997–2006)
  - En otras palabras (1997–2008)
  - La Mandrágora (1997–2009)
  - El Cine de La 2 (1998– )
  - Versión española (1998– )
  - Al habla (1998–2004)
  - Escuela del deporte (1999–2005)
  - Aquí hay trabajo (2000– )
  - Decogarden (2000–2004)
  - España en comunidad (2000–2020)
  - El Debate de la 2 (2002–2004)
- Telecinco
  - Informativos Telecinco (1990– )
  - Día a día (1996–2004)
  - Caiga quien caiga (1996–2008)
  - Crónicas marcianas (1997–2005)
  - La Mirada crítica (1998–2009)
  - ¿Quiere ser millonario? (1999–2004)
  - 7 vidas (1999–2006)
  - El comisario (1999–2009)
  - Nosolomúsica (1999–2012)
  - Survivor Spain (2000– )
  - Dinamita (2000–2004)
  - Hospital Central (2000–2012)
  - Big Brother Spain (2000–2017)
  - Art Attack (2001–2005)
  - La Noche con Fuentes y Cía (2001–2005)
  - Pecado original (2002–2005)
  - Visto y no visto (2002–2005)
  - Salsa rosa (2002–2006)
  - A tu lado (2002–2007)
  - Estrenos de cartelera (2002–2007)
- Canal+
  - El día después (1990–2005)
  - Redacción (1990–2005)
  - Lo + plus (1995–2005)
  - Las noticias del guiñol (1995–2005)
  - Magacine (1996–2005)

== Ending this year ==
- La 1
  - TPH Club (1999–2003)
  - Paraíso (2000–2003)
  - Pequeños grandes genios (2001–2003)
  - Géminis, venganza de amor (2002–2003)
  - El Show de Flo (2002–2003)
- La 2
  - El Planeta de los niños (2002–2003)
- Antena 3
  - El Primer café (1996–2003)
  - Policías, en el corazón de la calle (2000–2003)
  - El Gran test (2002–2003)
  - El lugar del crimen (2002–2003)
  - Mira tú por dónde (2002–2003)
- Telecinco
  - 20 tantos (2002–2003)
  - Javier ya no vive solo (2002–2003)

== Changes of network affiliation ==
Show	Moved From	Moved To
Disney Club (1998–2007)	Telecinco	La 1
El club de la comedia (1999–2017)	Telecinco	La 2
Survivor Spain (2000– )	Telecinco	Antena 3

== Foreign series debuts in Spain ==
English title	Spanish title	Original title	Channel	Country	Performers
24	24		Antena 3	USA	Kiefer Sutherland
Air America	Air América		Telecinco	USA	Lorenzo Lamas
Angel	Angel		Antena 3	USA	David Boreanaz
Band of Brothers	Hermanos de sangre		Telecinco	USA	Kirk Acevedo
CSI: Miami	CSI: Miami		Telecinco	USA	David Caruso
Dark Angel	Dark Angel		Antena 3	USA	Jessica Alba
Degrassi: The Next Generation	Degrassi: La nueva generación		Telecinco	CAN	Miriam McDonald
---	El payaso	Der Clown	Telecinco	GER	Sven Martinek
Digimon Frontier	Digimon 4	Dejimon Furontia	La 2	JAP	
Get Real	Asuntos de familia		Antena 3	USA	Jon Tenney
Gilmore Girls	Las chicas Gilmore		La 1	USA	Lauren Graham, Alexis Bledel
Honey, I Shrunk the Kids	Cariño, he encogido a los niños		Telecinco	USA	Peter Scolari
Jack & Jill	Jack y Jill		Canal +	USA	Ivan Sergei, Amanda Peet
My Sweet Fat Valentina	Mi gorda bella	Mi gorda bella	Antena 3	USA	Natalia Streignard
Night Visions	Gritos en la noche		Canal +	USA	
One on One	One on one		Telecinco	USA	Flex Alexander
Roswell	Roswell		Antena 3	USA	Shiri Appleby
Six Feet Under	A seis metros bajo tierra		La 1	USA	Peter Krause
Smallville	Smallville		La 1	USA	Tom Welling
Sweet Valley High	Las gemelas de Swett Valley		Antena 3	USA	Brittany Daniel, Cynthia Daniel
The Guardian	El guardián		Canal +	USA	Simon Baker
The West Wing	El ala oeste de la Casa Blanca		La 1	USA	Martin Sheen
Toonsylvania	Toonsylvania		Telecinco	USA	
Transformers: Armada	Transformers: Armada	Chō Robot Semetai Transformers	Telecinco	JAP	
UC: Undercover	UC Undercover		Antena 3	USA	Oded Fehr
Wedding Peach	Hada Nupcial	Ai Tenshi Densetsu Vedingu Pīchi	Antena 3	JAP	

== Deaths ==
- 1 January – Pepe Palau, host, 76.
- 9 February – José María Tasso, actor, 69.
- 4 April – José María Escuer, actor, 82.
- 8 April – José Couso, cameraman, 38.
- 10 April – Chumy Chúmez, comedian, 75.
- 2 May – Queta Claver, actress, 73.
- 7 July – Antonio Iranzo, actor, 73.
- 19 July – Maruchi Fresno, actress, 87.
- 23 July – Fernando García Tola, director, writer and host, 62.
- 7 November – Juanjo Menéndez, actor, 74.
- 2 December – Mayka Vergara, journalist, 54.

== See also ==
- 2003 in Spain
- List of Spanish films of 2003
