= 1987 in Spanish television =

This is a list of Spanish television related events in 1987.

== Events ==
- Music Band La Trinca members Josep Maria Mainat and Toni Cruz create production company Gestmusic.

== Debuts ==
Title	Channel	Debut	Performers/Host	Genre
48 horas	La 1	1987-10-10	Pedro Erquicia	News
A media voz	La 1	1987-04-08	Óscar Ladoire	Music
A tope	La 1	1987-04-21	Eva Mosquera	Music
Así fue, así lo cuenta	La 1	1987-04-29	Paco Costas	Cultural/Science
Los Aurones	La 1	1987-11-14		Children
El bigote de Babel	La 1	1987-02-19		Children
Clase media	La 1	1987-01-26	Antonio Ferrandis	Drama series
Cómicos	La 2	1987-01-13		Cultural
Talk show	La 1	1987-01-08	Victoria Prego	Talk show
El Edén	La 1	1987-06-17	Miguel Ángel Jenner	Music
En familia	La 1	1987-04-10	Iñaki Gabilondo	Talk show
La estación de Perpignan	La 2	1987-05-07	Paloma Chamorro	Cultural
Europa, Europa	La 1	1987-07-10	Pedro Erquicia	Cultural/Science
Hablando claro	La 1	1987-10-08	Inka Martí	Cultural/Science
La hora del lector	La 1	1987-04-07	Luis Carandell	Cultural/Science
La llamada de los gnomos	La 1	1987-10-04	Félix Acaso	Children
Lorca, muerte de un poeta	La 1	1987-11-28	Nicholas Grace	Drama series
Mofli, el último koala	La 1	1987-01-17		Children
Musiquísimos	La 2	1987-05-12	Fernando Argenta	Music
Muy personal	La 2	1987-05-03	Pilar Trenas	Talk show
Número 1	La 1	1987-04-11	Ángel Prieto	Music
Por la mañana	La 1	1987-04-08	Jesús Hermida	Variety show
Positrón	La 1	1987-02-16	Carlos Ballesteros	Children
¡Qué noche la de aquel año!	La 1	1987-06-12	Miguel Ríos	Music
Que viene Muzzy	La 2	1987-10-04	Izaskun Azurmendi	Cultural/Science
Recuerda cuando	La 1	1987-10-07	Manuel Galiana	Drama series
Sábado noche	La 1	1987-04-11	Toni Cantó	Music
El tiempo es oro	La 2	1987-04-14	Constantino Romero	Quiz show
Vida privada	La 1	1987-11-12	Héctor Alterio	Drama series
Vísperas	La 1	1987-06-03	Rafael Álvarez	Drama series

== Television shows ==
=== La 1 ===
- Telediario (1957- )
- Un, dos, tres... responda otra vez (1972-2004)
- Estudio estadio (1972-2005)
- Informe Semanal (1973- )
- Parlamento (1978-2014)
- Vivir cada día (1978-1988)
- Barrio Sésamo (1979-2000)
- De película (1982-1991)
- La Tarde (1983-1989)
- Otros pueblos (1983-2007)
- La Bola de Cristal (1984-1988)
- Con las manos en la masa (1984-1991)
- Los Marginados (1984-1991)
- A media tarde (1985-1988)
- Si lo sé no vengo (1985-1988)
- Entre amigos (1985-1989)
- Punto y aparte (1985-1991)
- Los Electroduendes (1986-1988)
- Buenos días (1986-1990)

=== La 2 ===
- Al filo de lo imposble (1982- )
- Pueblo de Dios (1982- )
- Últimas preguntas (1983- )
- En portada (1984- )
- Jazz entre amigos (1984-1991)
- Estadio 2 (1984-2007)
- Metrópolis (1985- )
- Documentos TV (1986- )
- Tendido cero (1986- )
- La voz humana (1986-1988)
- Agenda informativa (1986-1989)

== Ending this year ==
=== La 1 ===
- Gente joven (1976-1987)
- Más vale prevenir (1979-1987)
- Consumo (1981-1987)
- ¿Un Mundo feliz? (1981-1987)
- El Arte de vivir (1982-1987)
- Tocata (1983-1987)
- Ahí te quiero ver (1984-1987)
- Hola chicos (1984-1987)
- El Kiosco (1984-1987)
- Un País de sagitario (1984-1987)
- De siete en siete (1985-1987)
- Punto de encuentro (1985-1987)
- La Cesta de la compra (1986-1987)
- El Mundo es nuestro (1986-1987)
- Todo queda en casa (1986-1987)

=== La 2 ===
- Fin de siglo (1985-1987)
- El Domingo es nuestro (1986-1987)
- Follow Through (1986-1987)
- Plumier (1986-1987)
- Turno de oficio (1986-1987)

== Foreign series debuts in Spain ==
English title	Spanish title	Original title	Channel	Country	Performers
9 to 5	De 9 a 5		TVE	USA	Rita Moreno
Amerika	Amerika		TVE	USA	Kris Kristofferson
Berlin Alexanderplatz	Berlin Alexanderplatz	Berlin Alexanderplatz	TVE	GER	Hanna Schygulla
Bleak House	Casa desolada		TVE	UK	Robin Bailey
Cagney & Lacey	Cagney y Lacey		TVE	USA	Tyne Daly, Sharon Gless
Capitol	Capitolio		TVE	USA	Carolyn Jones
Châteauvallon	Fortuna y poder	Châteauvallon	TVE	FRA	Chantal Nobel
Cover Up	Camuflaje		TVE	USA	Jennifer O'Neill, Jon-Erik Hexum
Crossbow	Ballesta, las aventuras de Guillermo Tell		FORTA	USA	Will Lyman
Crossings	Vidas cruzadas		TVE	USA	Cheryl Ladd, Jane Seymour
Dempsey and Makepeace	Como el perro y el gato		TVE	USA	Michael Brandon, Glynis Barber
EastEnders	EastEnders		FORTA	UK	Kathy Beale
Faerie Tale Theatre	Cuenstos de hadas		TVE	USA	Shelley Duvall
Frankensteins tante	La tía de Frankenstein		TVE	EUR	Viveca Lindfors
Gabriela	Gabriela	Gabriela	TVE	BRA	Sônia Braga
Home to Roost	Un lugar donde dormir		TVE	UK	John Thaw, Reece Dinsdale
Hollywood Beat	El pulso de Hollywood		TVE	USA	Jack Scalia
Lady Blue	Lady Blue		TVE	USA	Jamie Rose
Lord Mountbatten: The Last Viceroy	Lord Mountbatten: el último virrey		FORTA	UK	Nicol Williamson
Lottery!	Lotería		TVE	USA	Ben Murphy
MacGyver	MacGyver		TVE	USA	Richard Dean Anderson
My Cousin Rachel	Mi prima Raquel		TVE	UK	Geraldine Chaplin
Rituals	Rituales		TVE	USA	Monte Markham
Scarecrow and Mrs. King	El espantapájaros y la señora King		FORTA	USA	Kate Jackson, Bruce Boxleitner
Sons and Daughters	Hijos e hijas		TVE	AUS	Rowena Wallace
Spenser: For Hire	Spenser, detective privado		TVE	USA	Robert Urich
Starman	Starman		TVE	USA	Robert Hays
The Secret Diary of Adrian Mole	El diario secreto de Adrian Mole		TVE	USA	Gian Sammarco

== Births ==
- 18 January - Tamara Gorro, pundit.
- 31 January - Selu Nieto, actor.
- 16 February - María Gómez, hostess.
- 21 August - Megan Montaner, actress.
- 31 October - Miguel Frigenti, pundit.
- 20 November - Rodrigo Vázquez, host.

== Deaths ==
- 30 April - Ángel Losada, host, 55
- 12 July - Amelia de la Torre, actress, 82

== See also ==
- 1987 in Spain
- List of Spanish films of 1987
