= 2003 in Spain =

- Decades: 1980s; 1990s; 2000s; 2010s; 2020s
- See also: History of Spain; Timeline of Spanish history; List of years in Spain

Events in the year 2003 in Spain.

== Incumbents ==
- Monarch: Juan Carlos I
- Prime Minister: José María Aznar López

=== Regional presidents ===
- Andalusia: Manuel Chaves
- Aragón: Marcelino Iglesias
- Asturias: Vicente Álvarez Areces
- Balearic Islands: Francesc Antich (until 26 June), Jaume Matas (starting 26 June)
- Basque Country: Juan José Ibarretxe
- Canary Islands: Román Rodríguez Rodríguez (until 4 July), Adán Martín Menis (starting 4 July)
- Cantabria: José Joaquín Martínez Sieso (until 27 June), Miguel Ángel Revilla (starting 27 June)
- Castilla–La Mancha: José Bono
- Castile and León: Juan Vicente Herrera
- Catalonia: Jordi Pujol (until 20 December), Pasqual Maragall (starting 20 December)
- Extremadura: Juan Carlos Rodríguez Ibarra
- Galicia: Manuel Fraga
- La Rioja: Pedro Sanz
- Community of Madrid: Alberto Ruiz-Gallardón (until 8 November), Esperanza Aguirre (starting 8 November)
- Region of Murcia: Ramón Luis Valcárcel
- Navarre: Miguel Sanz
- Valencian Community: José Luis Olivas (until 20 June), Francisco Camps (starting 20 June)
- Ceuta: Juan Jesús Vivas
- Melilla: Juan José Imbroda

== Events ==
- 2 January – Oil leakage from the sunken tanker Prestige threatens the southwestern coast of France. The prefect of Aquitaine reported a slick from the tanker is 50 kilometers (30 standard miles) from the coast. French Prime Minister Jean-Pierre Raffarin promised 50 million euros for the cleanup. The Prestige, which carried 77,000 tonnes of crude oil, sunk in late November 2002, off the coast of the Galician region of Spain.
- 17 March – Iraq disarmament crisis: Japanese prime minister Junichiro Koizumi said that he supports the U.S., U.K., and Spain for ending diplomatic efforts against Iraq. He also indicates no further UN resolution is necessary to invade Iraq.
- 22 June – Real Madrid clinches the Primera división, the top football league in Spain, beating Real Sociedad by two points. The very next day, Real fires its manager, Vicente del Bosque.
- 7 July – Thousands of people take part in the first bull run of the annual San Fermín festival in Pamplona, Spain. No serious injuries or gorings were reported.
- 24 October – Three same-sex couples in Spain, including a Madrid city councilman, apply for marriage licenses. They state that if the registry judge does not grant them the licenses, they will appeal to Spain's constitutional court, and as far as the European Court of Human Rights if necessary. They describe their actions as inspired by the recent rulings on same-sex marriage in Canada.
- 13 December – Spain has announced an agreement with Morocco to proceed with plans to build a rail tunnel beneath the Strait of Gibraltar, linking Europe and Africa. Assuming the project is technically and financially feasible, digging would start in 2008.

== Sports ==
- 2002–03 La Liga
- 2002–03 Segunda División
- 2002–03 Copa del Rey
- 2003 Vuelta a España

== Births ==
- 5 May – Carlos Alcaraz, tennis player
- 11 May – Fermín López, footballer
- 23 November – Métrika, songwriter and rapper

== Deaths ==
- 21 January – Antonio Domínguez Ortiz, 93, Spanish historian.
- 10 February – Carmen Vidal, 87, Spanish cosmetologist and businesswoman.
- 24 February – Antoni Torres, 59, Spanish footballer
- 10 March – Víctor Alba, 86, Spanish writer and anti-communist, anti-capitalist political journalist
- 31 March – Fermín Vélez, 43, Spanish sports car racing driver, two-time 12 Hours of Sebring winner, two-time Group C2 champion
- 2 April – Terenci Moix, 61, Spanish writer
- 7 April – Julio Anguita Parrado, 32, Spanish journalist and war correspondent (El Mundo)
- 8 April – José Couso, 37, Spanish cameraman
- 9 April – Jorge Oteiza, 94, Spanish painter and sculptor
- 9 May – Antonio Ibáñez Freire, 89, Spanish politician and army officer.
- 4 June – Serafín Rojo, 77, Spanish cartoonist and painter.
- 7 July – Antonio Iranzo, 73, Spanish film actor.
- 15 July – Roberto Bolaño, 50, Chilean-Spanish writer (The Savage Detectives, 2666)
- 15 August – Enric Llaudet, 86, Spanish businessman and sports executive.
- 1 September – Ramón Serrano Suñer, 101, Spanish politician.
- 18 October – Manuel Vázquez Montalbán, 64, Spanish novelist (Detective Carvalho saga), journalist and poet
- 19 October – Jaime Allende, 79, Spanish field hockey player (field hockey at the 1948 Summer Olympics)
- 28 October – Joan Perucho, 82, Spanish novelist, poet and art critic, and judge
- 31 October – José Juncosa, 81, Spanish football player and manager.
- 24 November – Floquet de Neu, 38-40, Spanish only albino western lowland gorilla in the world.
- 3 December – Dulce Chacón, 49, Spanish poet, novelist and playwright, Pancreatic cancer.
- 7 December – Barta Barri, 92, Hungarian-Spanish film actor.
- 21 December – Prince Alfonso of Hohenlohe-Langenburg, 79, Spanish businessman and playboy
- 27 December – Enric Bernat, 80, Spanish businessman, founder of Chupa Chups

== See also ==
- 2003 in Spanish television
- List of Spanish films of 2003
