= 2001 in Spanish television =

This is a list of Spanish television related events in 2001.

== Events ==
- 1 January:
  - The State Society of Industrial Participations (SEPI) becomes the main shareholder of RTVE.
  - TV Channel 40 Latino starts broadcasting.
  - TV channel Canal Panda stops broadcasting.
- 1 April: Television channel Beca TV starts broadcasting.
- 23 April: TV channel 8TV starts broadcasting.
- 1 June: Television channel Fox starts broadcasting.
- 11 September: Normal programming is suspended as a result of live broadcasting of the attacks in New York and Washington; The news program Telediario becomes the longest running time in history.
- 22 October: Talent Show Operación Triunfo becomes a real mass phenomemon in Spain.
- 16 November: Playhouse Disney starts broadcasting.
- 13 December: Castilla–La Mancha Regional TV Channel CMM TV starts broadcasting.

== Debuts ==
Title	Channel	Debut	Performers/Host	Genre
100% Movies	Telecinco	2001-05-21	Elia Galera	Movies
40 Classic	Canal +	2001-05-27	Joaquín Luqui	Music
¡A saco!	La 2	2001-10-22	Paco Vegara	Quiz Show
Abogados	Telecinco	2001-04-26	Javier Albalá	Drama Series
Academia de baile Gloria	TVE-1	2001-03-08	Lina Morgan	Sitcom
Acción 5 estrellas	Telecinco	2001-09-14		Movies
Adictos a los Simpson	Antena 3	2001-07-29		Variety Show
Agente 700	TVE-1	2001-09-07	Josema Yuste	Sitcom
Al descubierto	Antena 3	2001-08-01	Santi Acosta	Investigation
Amigos en la noche	TVE-1	2001-04-20	Isabel Pantoja	Music
Anima+	Canal +	2001-09-23		Cartoon
Ay, mi madre	TVE-1	2001-10-25	Inés Ballester	Reality show
Ciudad Sur	Antena 3	2001-01-08	Jaime Blanch	Soap Opera
Cómo se rodó...	Telecinco	2001-06-22		Movies
Corto español	Canal +	2001-07-27		Movies
Cuéntame cómo pasó	TVE-1	2001-09-13	Imanol Arias	Drama Series
De buena mañana	Antena 3	2001-09-10	Juan Ramón Lucas	Variety Show
Decogarden	La 2	2001-09-17	Susana Gil	Variety Show
Diario de guerra	Antena 3	2001-10-08	Ernesto Sáenz de Buruaga	News
Dime que me quieres	Antena 3	2001-01-11	Imanol Arias	Sitcom
El diario de Patricia	Antena 3	2001-07-09	Patricia Gaztañaga	Talk show
El flotador	TVE-1	2001-07-13	Guillermo Romero	Quiz Show
El secreto	TVE-1	2001-01-22	Lola Forner	Soap Opera
El show de los récords	Antena 3	2001-10-06	Manu Carreño	Game Show
El sueño olímpico	La 2	2001-10-26	Carlos Beltrán	Sport
En familia	TVE-1	2001-10-05	José Manuel Parada	Variedades
Esencia de poder	Telecinco	2001-06-25	Marian Aguilera	Soap Opera
Esta es mi historia	TVE-1	2001-06-05	Ana García Lozano	Talk show
Esto no es serio	Antena 3	2001-07-21	Antonio Hidalgo	Quiz Show
Fort Boyard	Telecinco	2001-07-04	Paula Vázquez	Game Show
Investigación policial	Antena 3	2001-07-12	José María Pou	News Magazine
La Batidora	Antena 3	2001-05-04		Videos
La línea de la vida	Telecinco	2001-03-09		Horoscope
La noche con Fuentes y Cía	Telecinco	2001-09-30	Manel Fuentes	Late Night
La semana digital	Canal +	2001-01-12		Science/Culture
Lo + de lo + Plus	Canal +	2001-06-29		Videos
Maldita la hora	Antena 3	2001-09-17	Máximo Pradera	Late Night
Mi cartera	Telecinco	2001-04-28	Mariona Xuclá	Science/Culture
Mi teniente	TVE-1	2001-09-18	Juan Luis Galiardo	Drama Series
Milenio	La 2	2001-03-11	Luis Pancorbo	Documentary
Mitos del cine erótico	Antena 3	2001-04-29		Movies
Moncloa ¿dígame?	Telecinco	2001-01-10	Javier Veiga	Sitcom
Muchoviaje	Antena 3	2001-07-27	Pello Ruiz Cabestany	Travel Show
Mujer 10	Antena 3	2001-01-19	Bertín Osborne	Game Show
Nada personal	Telecinco	2001-07-16	Nuria Roca	Variety Show
Noche y día	Antena 3	2001-03-04	Isabel Gemio	Talk Show
Noches de verano	TVE-1	2001-07-06	Mónica Hoyos	Variety Show
Nocturnos	Telecinco	2001-11-16		Music
Omaita en la primera	TVE-1	2001-03-30	Los Morancos	Comedy
Operación triunfo	TVE-1	2001-10-22	Carlos Lozano	Talent show
Otra dimensión	Antena 3	2001-01-24	Mon Santiso	News Magazine
Papá	Antena 3	2001-01-18	Mónica Molina	Sitcom
¡Qué bello es sobrevivir!	Telecinco	2001-12-01	J. Perucho, M. Fuentes, M. Conesa	Cartoon
Reportajes Canal +	Canal +	2001-06-29		Documentary
Rumore, rumore	Antena 3	2001-07-09	Jorge Javier Vázquez	Gossip Show
Tiempo al tiempo	TVE-1	2001-09-19	Concha Velasco	Variety Show
Tiempo límite	Telecinco	2001-03-10	Enric Calpena	Quiz Show
Tirititrán	La 2	2001-06-24	Lolita Flores	Music
Tú dirás	Telecinco	2001-01-29	María Teresa Campos	Talk Show
¡Vaya peña!	TVE-1	2001-06-05	Carlos Lozano	Quiz Show
Videos, vídeos	Antena 3	2001-07-22	Paz Padilla	Videos

== Television shows ==
- La 1
  - Telediario (1957– )
  - Estudio estadio (1972–2005)
  - Informe Semanal (1973– )
  - Parlamento (1978–2014)
  - Telepasión española (1990– )
  - Corazón, Corazón (1993–2010)
  - Cartelera (1994–2009)
  - Los Desayunos de TVE (1994–2020)
  - Cine de barrio (1995– )
  - El Grand Prix del verano (1995–2005)
  - Gente (1995–2011)
  - Corazón (1997– )
  - Música sí (1997–2004)
  - Saber vivir (1997–2009)
  - TPH Club (1999–2003)
  - Noche de fiesta (1999–2004)
  - ¡Ala... Dina! (2000–2002)
  - Paraíso (2000–2003)
  - Cruz y raya.com (2000–2004)
  - El Conciertazo (2000–2009)
- Antena 3
  - Antena 3 Noticias (1990– )
  - En buenas manos (1994–2005)
  - Club Megatrix (1995–2013)
  - Espejo público (1996– )
  - Menudas estrellas (1996–2002)
  - El Primer café (1996–2003)
  - Compañeros (1998–2002)
  - Sabor a ti (1998–2004)
  - Noche de impacto (1998–2005)
  - Desesperado Club Social (1999–2002)
  - Trato hecho (1999–2002)
  - Como la vida (1999–2004)
  - El club de la comedia (1999–2005)
  - La Noche de los errores (2000–2002)
  - Policías, en el corazón de la calle (2000–2003)
  - Ahora (2000–2006)
  - Pasapalabra (2000–2006)
- La 2
  - Al filo de lo imposble (1982– )
  - Pueblo de Dios (1982– )
  - Últimas preguntas (1983– )
  - En portada (1984– )
  - Estadio 2 (1984–2007)
  - Metrópolis (1985– )
  - Documentos TV (1986– )
  - Tendido cero (1986– )
  - Días de cine (1991– )
  - Línea 900 (1991–2007)
  - La Aventura del saber (1992– )
  - Jara y sedal (1992– )
  - Zona ACB (1993–2010)
  - Bricomanía (1994–2004)
  - La 2 noticias (1994–2020)
  - La noche temática, (1995– )
  - ¡Qué grande es el cine! (1995–2005)
  - Redes (1996–2013)
  - Agrosfera (1997– )
  - El escarabajo verde (1997– )
  - Saber y ganar (1997– )
  - América total (1997–2004)
  - A su salud (1997–2004)
  - Negro sobre blanco (1997–2004)
  - Noche abierta, La (1997–2004)
  - El Tercer grado (1997–2004)
  - La Botica de la abuela (1997–2006)
  - En otras palabras (1997–2008)
  - La Mandrágora (1997–2009)
  - El Cine de La 2 (1998– )
  - Versión española (1998– )
  - Al habla (1998–2004)
  - Escuela del deporte (1999–2005)
  - Aquí hay trabajo (2000– )
  - Decogarden (2000–2004)
  - España en comunidad (2000–2020)
- Telecinco
  - Informativos Telecinco (1990– )
  - Día a día (1996–2004)
  - Caiga quien caiga (1996–2008)
  - Al salir de clase (1997–2002)
  - Crónicas marcianas (1997–2005)
  - El Informal (1998–2002)
  - Periodistas (1998–2002)
  - La Mirada crítica (1998–2009)
  - La Gran ilusión (1999–2002)
  - ¿Quiere ser millonario? (1999–2004)
  - 7 vidas (1999–2006)
  - El comisario (1999–2009)
  - Nosolomúsica (1999–2012)
  - Survivor Spain (2000– )
  - El Club de la comedia (2000–2003)
  - Dinamita (2000–2004)
  - Hospital Central (2000–2012)
  - Big Brother Spain (2000–2017)
- Canal+
  - El día después (1990–2005)
  - Redacción (1990–2005)
  - Lo + plus (1995–2005)
  - Las noticias del guiñol (1995–2005)
  - Magacine (1996–2005)

== Ending this year ==
- La 1
  - Mitomanía (1995–2001)
  - Todo en familia (1999–2001)
  - Audacia (2000–2001)
  - El Botones Sacarino (2000–2001)
  - Días de vino (2000–2001)
  - Eurocanción (2000–2001)
  - In fraganti (2000–2001)
- La 2
  - El Mundo en 24 horas (2000–2001)
- Antena 3
  - Telemaratón (1993–2001)
  - Lluvia de estrellas (1995–2001)
  - La Parodia nacional (1996–2001)
  - Furor (1998–2001)
  - Manos a la obra (1998–2001)
  - Mírame (1999–2001)
  - Abierto 24 horas (2000–2001)
- Telecinco
  - Moros y cristianos (1997–2001)
  - El Juego del euromillón (1998–2001)
  - Buenas tardes (2000–2001)

== Foreign series debuts in Spain ==
English title	Spanish title	Original title	Channel	Country	Performers
Anne of Green Gables	Ana de las Tejas Verdes		Antena 3	CAN	
Archie's Weird Mysteries	Los misterios de Archie		Telecinco	USA	
Charmed	Embrujadas		Telecinco	USA	Shannen Doherty
Clueless	Fuera de onda		Telecinco	USA	Rachel Blanchard
---	Cuando seas mía	Cuando seas mía	La 1	MEX	Silvia Navarro
---	Cupido	Cupido	La 1	ARG	Gastón Duprat
Dawson's Creek	Dawson crece		La 1	USA	James Van Der Beek
Degree of Guilt	Grado de culpabilidad		Antena 3	USA	Daphne Zuniga
Eagle Riders	Eagle Riders		Telecinco	USA	
Fudge	Fudge		La 2	USA	Jake Richardson
Higher Ground	Tierras altas		Telecinco	USA	Hayden Christensen
It's Like, You Know...	Matando el tiempo		Telecinco	USA	Steven Eckholdt
L.A. Doctors	Médicos en los Ángeles		La 1	USA	Ken Olin
---	Las nuevas aventuras de Federrico	Las nuevas aventuras de Federrico	La 2	VEN	Carlos Villagrán
Malcolm & Eddie	Malcolm y Eddie		La 2	USA	Malcolm-Jamal Warner, Eddie Griffin
Michael Hayes	Michael Hayes		La 1	USA	David Caruso
Monty Python's Flying Circus	Monty Python's Flying Circus		FORTA	UK	Monty Python
My Daddy Long Legs	Papá Piernas Largas	Watashi no Ashinaga Ojisan	Antena 3	JAP	
Nano	Nano	Nano	La 1	USA	Gustavo Bermúdez
NewsRadio	Radio Noticias		FORTA	USA	Dave Foley
Once and Again	Una vez más		Telecinco	USA	Sela Ward, Billy Campbell
Relic Hunter	Cazatesoros		Telecinco	CAN	Tia Carrere
---	Reyes y Rey	Reyes y Rey	La 1	USA	Cristián de la Fuente
Rude Awakening	Pasados de vueltas		FORTA	USA	Sherilyn Fenn
Sex and the City	Sexo en Nueva York		Canal +	USA	S.J. Parker, K. Cattrall, K. Davis, C. Nixon
Sheena	Sheena		FORTA	USA	Gena Lee Nolin
Smart Guy	Este chico es un genio		La 2	USA	Tahj Mowry
Stargate SG-1	Stargate		FORTA	USA	Richard Dean Anderson
Strong Medicine	Doctoras de Filadelfia		FORTA	USA	Rosa Blasi
Tequila & Bonetti	Tequila y Bonetti		FORTA	ITA	Jack Scalia
---	Terra Nostra	Terra Nostra	La 1	BRA	Ana Paula Arósio
The Invisible Man	El hombre invisible		La 1	USA	Vincent Ventresca
The Naked Truth	La cruda realidad		Canal +	USA	Téa Leoni
The Revenge	La revancha	La revancha	La 1	USA VEN	Danna García
The Single Guy	El soltero		FORTA	USA	Jonathan Silverman
The Sopranos	Los Soprano		Canal +	USA	James Gandolfini, Lorraine Bracco
Trapp Family Story	Sonrisas y lágrimas	Torappu ikka monogatari	Antena 3	JAP	
Unhappily Ever After	Infelices para Siempre		La 2	USA	Geoff Pierson, Stephanie Hodge
---	Yo soy Betty, la fea	Yo soy Betty, la fea	Antena 3	COL	Ana María Orozco
Young Americans	Jóvenes rebeldes		FORTA	USA	Rodney Scott

== Births ==
- 4 April – Daniel Avilés, actor.
- 16 May – Carlota Boza, actress.

== Deaths ==
- 11 March, Eugenio, comedian, 59.
- 20 April, Antonio Asensio, business and former president of Antena 3, 53.
- 12 May, Maruja Fernández, hostess, 76.
- 14 July, Miguel Gila, comedian, 82.
- 29 August, Francisco Rabal, actor, 75.
- 26 October, Juan José Castillo, sport journalist, 80.
- 16 November, Carlos Estrada, actor, 79.
- 3 December, José Manuel Guisado "Mané", comedian and actor, 34.

== See also ==
- 2001 in Spain
- List of Spanish films of 2001
