= 2002 in Spanish television =

This is a list of Spanish television related events in 2002.

== Events ==
- 17 January: TV channel Golf+ (later known as Canal+ Golf, Movistar Golf+ and Golf por Movistar Plus+) starts broadcasting.
- 11 February: The final of the Talent Show Operación Triunfo is followed by 12.873.000 viewers (68% share).
- 25 May: Rosa López performing the song Europe's living a celebration represents Spain at the Eurovision Song Contest 2002, that took place in Tallinn, ranking 7th. The show is followed by 12,750,000 viewers (80.4% share).
- 18 July: José Antonio Sánchez is appointed General Director of RTVE.

== Debuts ==
Title	Channel	Debut	Performers/Host	Genre
+ Te vale	Canal +	2002-09-23		Science/Culture
100% cinemaspop	Antena 3	2002-05-04	Lucía Riaño	Movies
20 tantos	Telecinco	2002-12-23	Noelia Castro	Soap Opera
A medias	Antena 3	2002-07-10	Nancho Novo	Sitcom
A plena luz	Antena 3	2002-09-16	Pedro Piqueras	Variety Show
A tu lado	Telecinco	2002-02-11	Emma García	Gossip Show
A3N24	Antena 3	2002-07-10		News
Abierto al anochecer	Antena 3	2002-01-08	Jordi González	Gossip Show
Agua, la gota de la vida	La 2	2002-02-03		Documentary
Amazonia, última llamada	La 2	2002-02-24		Documentary
Ana y los siete	TVE-1	2002-03-18	Ana Obregón	Sitcom
Antena3 con la selección	Antena 3	2002-06-01	J.J. Santos	Sport
Bubbles	La 2	2002-08-14		Documentary
Buenos días España	Antena 3	2002-09-16	Roberto Arce	News
Centímetros cúbicos	Antena 3	2002-03-23		Sport
Cerca de ti	TVE-1	2002-07-15	Óscar Martínez	Talk show
Chat 5	Telecinco	2002-12-03		Variety Show
Confianza ciega	Antena 3	2002-01-27	Francine Gálvez	Reality Show
Decisión final	Telecinco	2002-03-18	Luis Lorenzo Crespo	Quiz Show
El club de los viajeros	Telecinco	2002-04-27		Documentary
El debate de Gran Hermano	Telecinco	2002-10-06	Jesús Vázquez	Reality show
El debate de La 2	La 2	2002-02-07	Josep Puigbó	Talk Show
El Gladiador	TVE-1	2002-02-04	Ramón García	Game Show
El gran test	Antena 3	2002-12-15	Paula Vázquez	Quiz Show
El legado	Telecinco	2002-07-08	Roberto Kamphoff	Quiz Show
El lugar del crimen	Antena 3	2002-12-05	Mon Santiso	News Magazine
El planeta de los niños	La 2	2002-01-25	Miriam de las Heras	Science/Culture
El rival más débil	TVE-1	2002-05-15	Nuria González	Quiz Show
El show de Flo	TVE-1	2002-10-02	Florentino Fernández	Comedy
El tercer planeta	La 2	2002-01-05		Documentary
Estamos rodando	Antena 3	2002-02-02		Movies
Estrenos de cartelera	Telecinco	2002-03-02	Raquel Revuelta	Movies
Estudio de actores	Antena 3	2002-04-28	Juan Ramón Lucas	Reality show
Géminis, venganza de amor	TVE-1	2002-09-30	Ana Turpin	Soap Opera
Gladiator Academy	Telecinco	2002-10-11		Cartoon
Goles europeos	La 2	2002-02-21		Sport
Grandiosas	Telecinco	2002-04-13	Rosa Villacastín	Variety Show
Hay una carta para ti	Antena 3	2002-09-22	Isabel Gemio	Talk show
Hora punta, lo nunca visto	TVE-1	2002-08-01	Francesc Cruanyes	Videos
Hoy es tu día	Antena 3	2002-07-20	Mónica Martínez	Variety Show
Infiltrados	Telecinco	2002-08-01	Javier Nart	Investigation
Javier ya no vive solo	Telecinco	2002-01-13	Emilio Aragón	Sitcom
La cápsula	Antena 3	2002-10-19	Eduardo Aldán	Variety Show
La cocina de Karlos Arguiñano	La 2	2002-07-28	Karlos Arguiñano	Cooking Show
La corriente alterna	Telecinco	2002-01-24	Llum Barrera	Comedy
La noche + clásica	Canal +	2002-05-09		Music
La sesión del abonado	Canal +	2002-02-07		Movies
La verdad de Laura	TVE-1	2002-01-02	Mónica Estarreado	Soap Opera
Las caras del crimen	Antena 3	2002-07-17	Sonsoles Suárez	News Magazine
Los caminos de la ciencia	La 2	2002-05-18		Cooking Show
Los vigilantes de la tele	Antena 3	2002-01-13	Manu Carreño	Videos
Me gustas tú	Telecinco	2002-08-26	Teté Delgado	Dating show
Mira tú por dónde	Antena 3	2002-11-26	Paula Vázquez	Variety Show
Music 3	Antena 3	2002-10-06	Silvia Fominaya	Music
Noche de Champions	Canal +	2002-10-02	Julio Maldonado	Sport
Padre coraje	Antena 3	2002-03-13	Juan Diego	Drama Series
Pecado original	Telecinco	2002-10-15		Gossip Show
Popstars	Telecinco	2002-07-10	Jesús Vázquez	Talent show
Por la mañana	TVE-1	2002-09-05	Inés Ballester	Variety Show
Queremos saber más	Antena 3	2002-02-07	Mercedes Milá	Talk Show
Ratones coloraos	Canal Sur	2002-11-20	Jesús Quintero	Talk Show
Salsa rosa	Telecinco	2002-09-21	Santi Acosta	Talking Show
Se busca una estrella	Antena 3	2002-03-29	Bertín Osborne	Talent show
Suena la noche	TVE-1	2002-07-31	Guillermo Romero	Music
Tareas de antaño	La 2	2002-08-01		Documentary
The Morancos Chou	TVE-1	2002-05-17	Los Morancos	Comedy
Todo por amor	Antena 3	2002-10-16	Andoni Ferreño	Dating show
Toon Disney	Telecinco	2002-07-08		Children
Triunfomanía	TVE-1	2002-04-12	Carlos Lozano	Music
Un paso adelante	Antena 3	2002-01-08	Mónica Cruz	Drama Series
Verano noche	Antena 3	2002-07-12	Bertín Osborne	Variety Show
Visto y no visto	Telecinco	2002-06-22		Videos

== Television shows ==
- La 1
  - Telediario (1957– )
  - Estudio estadio (1972–2005)
  - Informe Semanal (1973– )
  - Parlamento (1978–2014)
  - Telepasión española (1990– )
  - Corazón, Corazón (1993–2010)
  - Cartelera (1994–2009)
  - Los Desayunos de TVE (1994–2020)
  - Cine de barrio (1995– )
  - El Grand Prix del verano (1995–2005)
  - Gente (1995–2011)
  - Corazón (1997– )
  - Música sí (1997–2004)
  - Saber vivir (1997–2009)
  - TPH Club (1999–2003)
  - Noche de fiesta (1999–2004)
  - Paraíso (2000–2003)
  - Cruz y raya.com (2000–2004)
  - El Conciertazo (2000–2009)
  - Cuéntame cómo pasó (2001– )
  - Pequeños grandes genios (2001–2003)
  - Esta es mi historia (2001–2004)
  - Operación triunfo (2001–2004)
- Antena 3
  - Antena 3 Noticias (1990– )
  - En buenas manos (1994–2005)
  - Club Megatrix (1995–2013)
  - Espejo público (1996– )
  - El Primer café (1996–2003)
  - Sabor a ti (1998–2004)
  - Noche de impacto (1998–2005)
  - Como la vida (1999–2004)
  - El club de la comedia (1999–2005)
  - Policías, en el corazón de la calle (2000–2003)
  - Ahora (2000–2006)
  - Pasapalabra (2000–2006)
  - El Diario de Patricia (2001–2008)
- La 2
  - Al filo de lo imposble (1982– )
  - Pueblo de Dios (1982– )
  - Últimas preguntas (1983– )
  - En portada (1984– )
  - Estadio 2 (1984–2007)
  - Metrópolis (1985– )
  - Documentos TV (1986– )
  - Tendido cero (1986– )
  - Días de cine (1991– )
  - Línea 900 (1991–2007)
  - La Aventura del saber (1992– )
  - Jara y sedal (1992– )
  - Zona ACB (1993–2010)
  - Bricomanía (1994–2004)
  - La 2 noticias (1994–2020)
  - La noche temática, (1995– )
  - ¡Qué grande es el cine! (1995–2005)
  - Redes (1996–2013)
  - Agrosfera (1997– )
  - El escarabajo verde (1997– )
  - Saber y ganar (1997– )
  - América total (1997–2004)
  - A su salud (1997–2004)
  - Negro sobre blanco (1997–2004)
  - Noche abierta, La (1997–2004)
  - El Tercer grado (1997–2004)
  - La Botica de la abuela (1997–2006)
  - En otras palabras (1997–2008)
  - La Mandrágora (1997–2009)
  - El Cine de La 2 (1998– )
  - Versión española (1998– )
  - Al habla (1998–2004)
  - Escuela del deporte (1999–2005)
  - Aquí hay trabajo (2000– )
  - Decogarden (2000–2004)
  - España en comunidad (2000–2020)
- Telecinco
  - Informativos Telecinco (1990– )
  - Día a día (1996–2004)
  - Caiga quien caiga (1996–2008)
  - Crónicas marcianas (1997–2005)
  - La Mirada crítica (1998–2009)
  - ¿Quiere ser millonario? (1999–2004)
  - 7 vidas (1999–2006)
  - El comisario (1999–2009)
  - Nosolomúsica (1999–2012)
  - Survivor Spain (2000– )
  - El Club de la comedia (2000–2003)
  - Dinamita (2000–2004)
  - Hospital Central (2000–2012)
  - Big Brother Spain (2000–2017)
  - Art Attack (2001–2005)
  - La Noche con Fuentes y Cía (2001–2005)
- Canal+
  - El día después (1990–2005)
  - Redacción (1990–2005)
  - Lo + plus (1995–2005)
  - Las noticias del guiñol (1995–2005)
  - Magacine (1996–2005)

== Ending this year ==
- La 1
  - ¡Ala... Dina! (2000–2002)
  - Tiempo al tiempo (2001–2002)
- Antena 3
  - Menudas estrellas (1996–2002)
  - Compañeros (1998–2002)
  - Desesperado Club Social (1999–2002)
  - Trato hecho (1999–2002)
  - La Noche de los errores (2000–2002)
  - De buena mañana (2001–2002)
  - El Show de los récords (2001–2002)
  - Videos, videos (2001–2002)
- Telecinco
  - Al salir de clase (1997–2002)
  - El Informal (1998–2002)
  - Periodistas (1998–2002)
  - La Gran ilusión (1999–2002)
  - ¡Qué bello es sobrevivir! (2001–2002)

== Foreign series debuts in Spain ==
English title	Spanish title	Original title	Channel	Country	Performers
Alias	Alias		Telecinco	USA	Jennifer Garner
Big Bad Beetleborgs	Beetleborgs		Antena 3	USA	
Crash Zone	Zona de choque		Telecinco	AUS	Damien Bodie
CSI: Crime Scene Investigation	CSI		Telecinco	USA	William Petersen
Digimon Tamers	Digimon 3	Dejimon Teimāzu	La 2	JAP	
---	Ecomoda	Ecomoda	Antena 3	COL	Ana María Orozco, Jorge Enrique Abello
---	El inútil		Antena 3	USA	Julián Arango, Ruddy Rodríguez
Moesha	Moesha		Antena 3	USA	Brandy Norwood
Oliver Twist	Oliver Twist		Antena 3	UK	Sam Smith
Once and Again	Una vez más		Telecinco	USA	Sela Ward, Billy Campbell
Princess Sissi	Princesa Sissi	Princesse Sissi	Antena 3	CAN FRA	
Sherlock Holmes in the 22nd Century	Sherlock Holmes en el siglo XXII		Telecinco	USA UK	
So Weird	Fenómenos extraños		Telecinco	USA	Cara DeLizia
The Blue Planet	Planeta Azul		Canal +	UK	
The Secret Lives of Men	Ellos lo cuentan todo		Canal +	USA	Peter Gallagher
Tucker	Tucker		Antena 3	USA	Eli Marienthal
Veronica's Closet	El secreto de Verónica		Canal +	USA	Kirstie Alley
Will & Grace	Will y Grace		La 1	USA	Eric McCormack, Debra Messing

== Births ==
- 31 March – Priscilla Delgado, actress.

== Deaths ==
- 16 January – Alfonso del Real, actor, 85.
- 21 January – Adolfo Marsillach, actor, director and writer, 73.
- 27 January – Mari Carmen Prendes, actress, 95.
- 10 March – Iran Eory, actress, 64.
- 28 March – Juan Guerrero Zamora, director, 75.
- 10 July – María Massip, actress, 59.
- 29 August – Luis Carandell, journalist, 73.
- 27 November – Juan Viñas, journalist, 84.
- 13 December – Juan Rosa, actor, 50.

== See also ==
- 2002 in Spain
- List of Spanish films of 2002
