= 2001 in Spain =

- Decades: 1980s; 1990s; 2000s; 2010s; 2020s
- See also: History of Spain; Timeline of Spanish history; List of years in Spain

Events in the year 2001 in Spain.

== Incumbents ==
- Monarch: Juan Carlos I
- Prime Minister: José María Aznar López

== Events ==
=== February ===
- 5: Endesa and Iberdrola, two electrical companies announce that the merger process that began in October 2000 has stopped and will not be finalized.
- 11: 7 Technicians of the Compañía Lírica die in a traffic accident.
- 13: Javier Bardem is nominated for an Academy Award for his role in Julian Schnabel's film Before Night Falls, being the first Spanish actor to do so.
- 22: Terrorist group ETA execute a car bombing that kills two employees of the company Elektra in San Sebastián.

=== April ===
- 7: The Partido de Acción Socialista (PASOC) agrees to abandon its federal congress within the United and Alternative Left.
- 23: Madrid is chosen to be a World Book Capital

=== May ===
13: The EAJ-PNV/EA coalition (Basque Nationalist Party and Eusko Alkartasuna) attains a great victory during the Basque regional elections, forming a government for the next four years.

=== August ===
- 24: Singer Joaquin Sabina suffered a minor stroke because of excessive drug use that would lead him to the brink of death.
- 31: After the death of twelve patients undergoing hemodialysis in Valencia, Madrid and Barcelona, The Department of Pharmacy decides granting a protective detention of a dialyzer marketed by multinational Baxter.

=== December ===
- The Orquesta Ciudad de Almería, OCAL (City Orchestra of Almeria) is founded in the Province of Almería,

== Sports ==
- 2000–01 La Liga
- 2000–01 Segunda División
- 2000–01 Copa del Rey
- 2001 Vuelta a España

== Births ==
- January 9: Eric García, footballer
- January 29: Melania Rodríguez, trampolinist
- February 11: Bryan Gil, footballer
- April 4: Daniel Aviles, actor
- August 4: Robert Vilarasau, trampolinist

== Deaths ==
- December 23 - Vincente Gómez, guitarist and composer (born 1911)

== See also ==
- 2001 in Spanish television
- List of Spanish films of 2001
