= 2002 in Spain =

- Decades: 1980s; 1990s; 2000s; 2010s; 2020s
- See also: History of Spain; Timeline of Spanish history; List of years in Spain

Events in the year 2002 in Spain.

== Incumbents ==
- Monarch: Juan Carlos I
- Prime Minister: José María Aznar López

== Events ==
1 January — The Euro Currency officially became the legal tender for Spain, along with the other European Union (EU) Eurozone member area countries, replacing the Spanish peseta by being introduced physically with the official launch of the currency coins and banknotes.

July - Perejil Island Crisis, a diplomatic and military tension erupted between Spain and Morocco after Moroccan soldiers occupied the Perejil Island, Spain launched a military operation to retake it.

November- Prestige oil spill occurred when an oil tanker sank off the Galician coast and caused one of the Spain's most severe environmental catastrophes polluted large areas of the shoreline and prompted widespread political backlash.

Economic performance - Spain showed an economic growth compared to other EU countries, driven by construction, tourism and domestic consumption.

== Sports ==
- 2001–02 La Liga
- 2001–02 Segunda División
- 2001–02 Copa del Rey
- 2002 Vuelta a España

== Births ==
- 30 April – Miguel Urdangarín y de Borbón, third son of Infanta Cristina of Spain and Iñaki Urdangarín
- 11 June – Naim García, Malaysian footballer
- 12 June – Nico Williams, footballer
- 13 October – David Franco, trampolinist
- – Isabel Peralta, far-right activist

== Deaths ==
- Camilo José Cela, 85, Spanish novelist, poet, and essayist, 1989 Nobel Prize in Literature.
- Ramón Grosso, 58, Spanish footballer, cancer.
- Carlos Casares Mouriño, 60, Spanish Galician language writer, cardiac arrest.
- Xavier Montsalvatge, 90, Spanish composer and music critic.
- Carlos Berlanga, 42, Spanish musician and painter.
- Carmelo Bernaola, 72, Spanish composer and clarinetist.
- Jaime Brocal Remohí, 66, Spanish comic book artist.
- Pedro Alberto Cano Arenas, 33, Spanish footballer, cerebral hemorrhage.
- Eduardo Chillida, 78, Spanish Basque sculptor.
- Ricardo Calvo, 58, Spanish chess International Master, doctor, chess historian, author and reporter.
- Infanta Beatriz of Spain, 93, Spanish noblewoman and daughter of King Alfonso XIII.

== See also ==
- 2002 in Spanish television
- List of Spanish films of 2002
