= Alicia Gómez Montano =

Spanish radio and television journalist and professor (1955–2020)

- Born: 1955; Madrid, Spanish State
- Died: 18 January 2020 (aged 64–65); Madrid, Spain
- Education: Complutense University of Madrid
- Occupations: Journalist; University professor
- Years active: 1978–2020

Alicia Gómez Montano (1955 – 18 January 2020) was a Spanish radio and television journalist and a university professor. She began her journalistic career at Radio Madrid in 1978 and subsequently worked at Radio Nacional de España (RNE) between 1980 and 1988. Montanto was RNE's Head of National Information at Televisión Española (TVE) and then was made deputy director of the TVE current affairs television programme Informe Semanal in 1996. She was director of Informe Semanal between May 2004 and August 2012 and was elected vice-president of the Spanish section of Reporters Without Borders in late 2017. Montano was appointed RTVE's first Equality Director in October 2018 and served in the role until her death in January 2020. She won various awards for her journalistic work.

== Biography ==
Alicia Gómez Montano was born in 1955 in Madrid. She graduated from the Complutense University of Madrid (UCM) with a Doctor of Philosophy in Information Sciences, and taught master's degree television journalism courses at UCM. Montano began her professional career in radio at Radio Madrid (part of the Cadena SER network) from 1978 to 1980. She went to Radio Nacional de España (RNE) in 1980, following her passing RNE's entry examination and being appointed Director of News of the network's Territorial Center in Navarre. Montano became infatuated with the Basque Country, before leaving the Navarre branch in 1988. She was appointed head of RNE's National Information of the Nacional de los Telediarios at Televisión Española (TVE) upon her returning to Madrid in the same year, working alongside journalist Jesús Hermida.

Montano was appointed deputy director of the TVE current affairs television programme Informe Semanal in 1996, focusing not on politics as she had in the past, but more on cultural issues as well as terrorism-related news in Spain, reported on the ceasefire of the Basque separatist group ETA. She earned the silver medal at the New York Film Festival for her 1997 report La vuelta de los voluntarios de la libertad and one from the Ministry of the Presidency for the project 1000 mujeres asesinadas. In May 2004, she was appointed director of Informe Semanal, replacing Baltasar Magro. Montano would also hold one of five inaugural TVE News Services Council sub-directorates and was appointed head of special events.

Two years later, she authored the book La manipulación en televisión. Montano received the 18th edition of the Research Awards on Audiovisual Communication Award for her study Pluralismo, tutela política y órganos de control en el servicio público de radiotelevisión de ámbito estatal. La manipulación como fenómeno social. La reforma de RTVE in June 2006. Montano won the Spanish Academy of Television Arts and Sciences' Best Programme Director Award in 2011. She left her directorship in August 2012, and went on to work on the programme En portada as a reporter in the newsroom. That same year, Montano published the book Por una mirada ética. Conversaciones con Alicia Gómez Montano.

In November 2017, Montano was elected vice-president of the Spanish section of Reporters Without Borders, and was appointed RTVE's first Equality Director in July 2018 over 20 candidates selected by a committee of experts; her RTVE colleagues remarked she was "head of almost everything." She opted for a multitude of content from the perspective of a feminist and defend women's rights and freedoms on all platforms. Montano worked to establish equality between men and women in content making and television and remove inadequate practices, prejudices and unconscious biases.

She was one of twenty people shortlisted to become RTVE chair in December 2018. Montano also contributed to the magazines Fotogramas and Qué Leer, and also earned the Consell de l'Audiovisual de Catalunya's First Research Prize as well as the Asociación de Mujeres Empresarias's Award. She was a patron of the Canis Majoris Foundation and coordinated its annual conference. Following Montano's death, Carolina Pecharromán was appointed RTVE's new Equality Director on 1 March 2020.

== Personal life ==
She was a committed feminist and a promoter of equality. On the morning of 18 January 2020, Montano died from cancer she had been diagnosed with a few years earlier at the Sanchinarro University Hospital in Madrid. She was given a funeral service at the North Funeral Home on Calle de Valdegovía 8 the following afternoon.

== Legacy ==
Borja Terán of La Informacion wrote that the seven inspirations of the works of Montano at RTVE as "the report must always have the gaze of the journalist"; "daring sensible (and sometimes a bit foolish) innovation"; "disclosure from the nuance"; "unlearn the set phrase"; "speak to the citizen, not the consumer"; "flee the state of emergency" and "work as if you were always starting". Reporters without Borders' Spanish section and other organisations held a tribute night to her at the Casa de América on the evening of 5 February. She was posthumously voted the recipient the 2020 King of Spain International Journalism Awards for Digital Journalism by a jury.
