= Manzanita (singer) =

Spanish guitarist, singer, songwriter

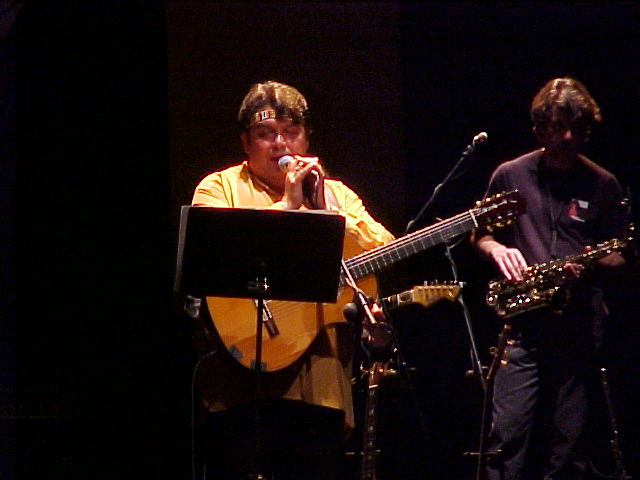
Manzanita in Fuerteventura. March 2001

José Manuel Ortega Heredia (Madrid, 7 February 1956 - Alhaurín de la Torre, Málaga, 5 December 2004), known by his pseudonym Manzanita ('little apple'), was a Spanish singer and guitarist.

In 1978, with producer José Luis de Carlos, he recorded his first solo album, Poco ruido y mucho duende, in a very personal style with flamenco nuances. The theme Verde, adapted from a poem by Lorca, was a great success. In 1980, he recorded his second LP Espíritu sin nombre with the palmero Daniel Barba de las Arenas. With his third album, in 1981, Talco y bronce, he surpassed half a million copies in Spain with the singles Un ramito de violetas and Por tu ausencia. They were followed by Cuando la noche te envuelve (1982), La quiero a morir (1983) and Mal de amores (1984).

In 1986, he released Echando sentencias, including Arab and Indian instruments. In 1988, he launched En voz baja a las rosas, with adaptations of Sor Juana Ines de la Cruz, Góngora and Lorca. In 1993, he made testimony to his faith in the album Quédate con Cristo. After a long silence, in which he only sang for the Evangelical Church, he returned in 1998 with the album Por tu ausencia, a live recording of greatest hits and new songs that became a gold record. In 1999, he repeated the gold record with the soundtrack of the film Sobreviviré.

In 2000 he recorded Dímelo, a new gold record, and in 2002 Gitano cubano, accompanied by Raimundo Amador, Lolita and Cuban singers Lucrecia and David Montes.

== Albums ==
- Poco ruido y mucho duende (CBS, 1978)
- Espíritu sin nombre (CBS, 1980)
- Talco y bronce (CBS, 1981)
- Cuando la noche te envuelve (CBS, 1982)
- La quiero a morir (CBS, 1983)
- Mal de amores (CBS, 1984)
- Echando sentencias (RCA, 1986)
- En voz baja a las rosas (RCA, 1988)
- Quédate con Cristo (Horus, 1993)
- Por tu ausencia (WEA, 1998) live
- Dímelo (WEA, 2000)
- Gitano cubano (WEA, 2002)
- La cucharita (CDI, 2004)
