= Cristina Olea =

Spanish journalist (born 1982)

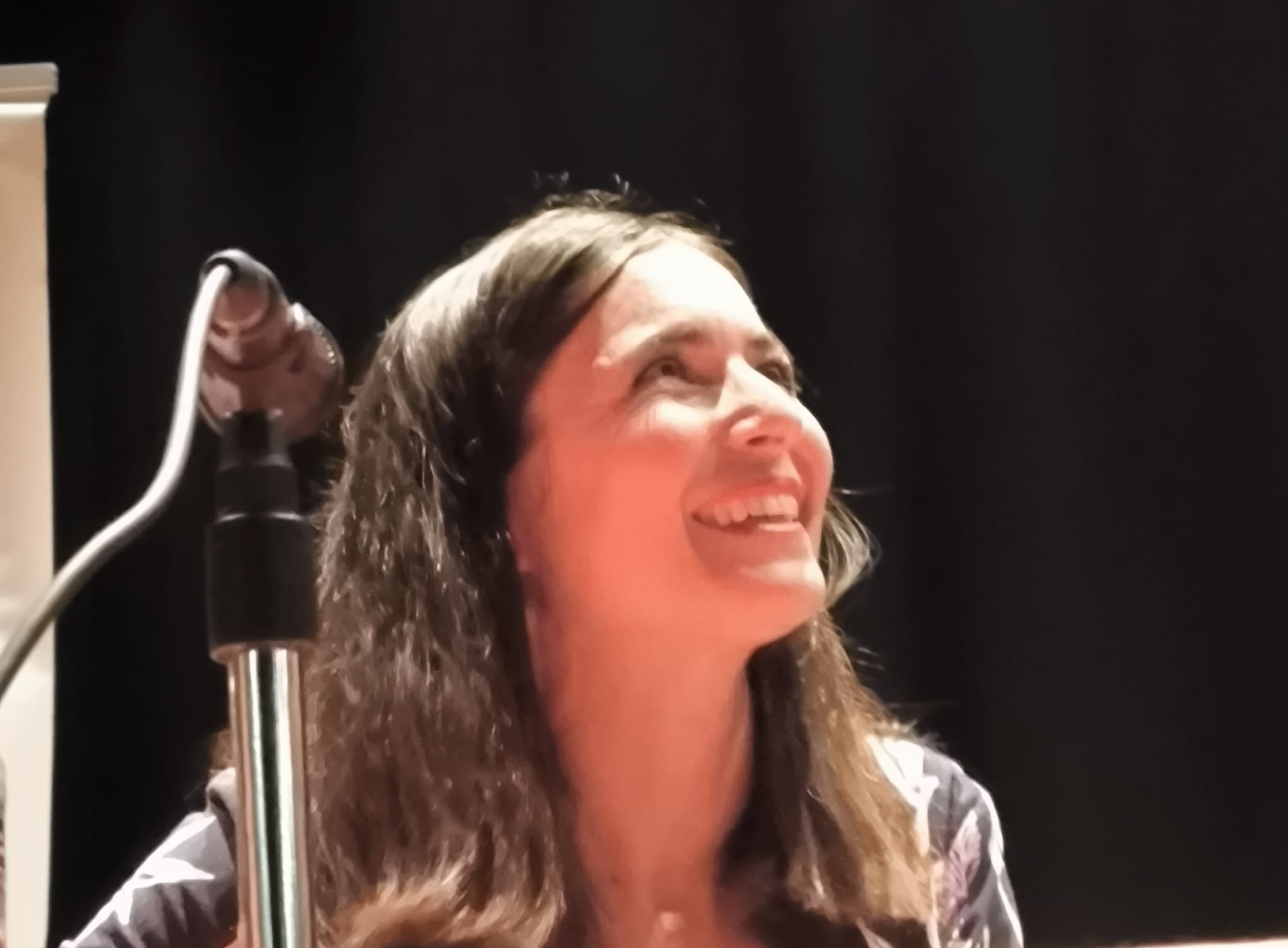
- Born: Cristina Olea Fernández; 28 November 1982 (age 43); Vigo, Spain
- Occupation: Journalist
- Employer: Televisión Española
- Awards: Golden Globe in the World Media Festival

Cristina Olea (born 28 November 1982) is a Spanish journalist.

== Biography ==
Olea did her initial training at the University of Santiago de Compostela where she graduated in Journalism in 2004. She also earned a Master's degree in Television Journalism from the RTVE Institute, and a Diploma of Advanced Studies (DEA) in Humanities from the Autonomous University of Barcelona.

Since 2006, she has worked for Televisión Española as a parliamentary reporter and later, in the international section. She has served as a special envoy to various countries and covered major events, including the 2012 United States elections, when Barack Obama was re-elected, and the 2013 papal conclave, when Jorge Mario Bergoglio was elected Pope, taking the name Francis.

Since 2018 she has been a correspondent for Televisión Española in Washington D. C. (United States). In January 2021 she interviewed former US President Barack Obama for the program Informe Semanal.

== Awards ==
2013

Golden Globe in the World Media Festival (Hamburg) for her report The disenchantment of Europe for the news program En Portada.

2013

Grand Prize of the Jury of the World Media Festival (Hamburg) with El desencanto de Europa, report for the program En Portada.
