= Pedro Erquicia =

Spanish journalist and news anchor (1943–2018)

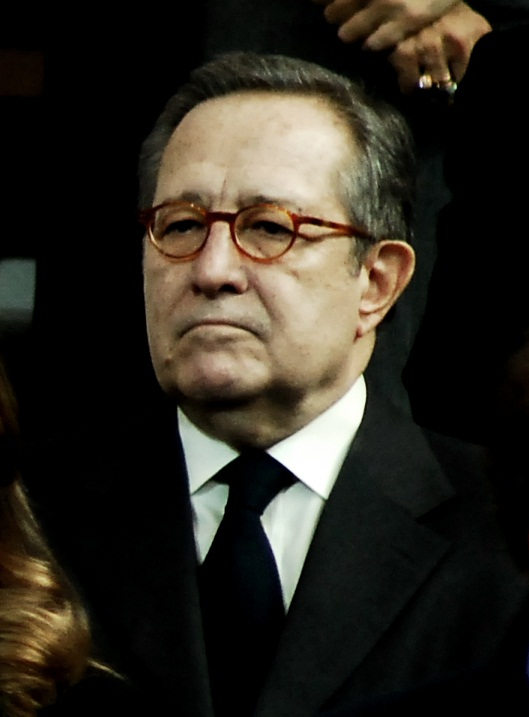
- Erquicia in 2012
- Born: Pedro Erquicia López de Montenegro; 24 March 1943; San Sebastián, Spain
- Died: 20 April 2018 (aged 75); Madrid, Spain
- Occupations: Journalist and news anchor

Pedro Erquicia López de Montenegro (24 March 1943 – 20 April 2018) was a Spanish journalist and news anchor.

He joined Televisión Española in July 1965 where he developed most of his television career. The first television program that he presented was Panorama de Actualidad from 1968 until 1970 and TVE's newscast Telediario (1972–1973).

In 1973 Erquicia created one of the longest running programs in Spanish television: Informe Semanal, which resumes the news and affairs of the last seven days (Based upon CBS's 60 Minutes). He directed it until 1978 and anchored it from 1976 until 1978. It was at that time when he had to cover the attempted coup d'état perpetrated on 23 February 1981 and record the message to the Nation of King Juan Carlos I.

In 1987 he was fired by TVE and later he joined the then recently created public broadcaster Telemadrid.

In 1990 Erquicia returned to TVE when he was hired to direct and anchor Documentos TV and from 1996 until 2007 he was in charge of the Direction of Programs of Current Affairs and Investigation.

In April 2008 Erquicia reached retirement. He died on 20 April 2018 in Madrid, after suffering a long illness.

== Awards ==
- Antena de Oro (1973) for Informe Semanal
- Premio Ondas (1975) for Informe Semanal
