= Adela Cantalapiedra =

Spanish TV presenter (born 1945)

- Born: 22 September 1945 (age 80); Arenas de San Pedro, Ávila, Spain
- Occupation: News anchor

Adela Cantalapiedra (born 22 September 1945) is a Spanish television presenter who has worked primarily on Televisión Española. She was a presenter of its flagship newscast Telediario between 1974 and 1980 and of Informe Semanal between 1980 and 1981.
