= Los Lunnis =

Spanish children's television show

Los Lunnis is a Spanish children's puppet television show produced by TVE and broadcast by La 2 from 15 September 2003 and Clan since 2010 after the change on La 2's programming. It was also broadcast on the weekends on La 1 until 2011.

The authors of the original idea are the TVE screenwriters Carmina Roig and Daniel Cerdà. Both conceived it, first under the supervision of the director of TVE Catalonia, Paco Freixinet, and later under the former head of news programmes, Valentín Villagrasa. Thanks to the song "Los Lunnis y los niños nos vamos a la cama" (The Lunnis and Kids Are Going to Sleep"), composed by Cerdà and Jaume Copons, the program gained popularity. Currently, the show is composed of the following sections: Lunnis and their friends, Lunigags, English lessons, Good Habits, The Musical Rocket, Lunnipedia, and UNICEF.

== Plot ==
The Lunnis are extraterrestrial beings that live in the world of Luna Lunera. There they have to resolve all type of plots and problems, some caused by the pirate Lucanero, who wants to steal the Big Magic Book of the witch Lubina. In March 2009, begins a new stage in which it changes the appearance of the Lunnis, the world of the Lunnis and the disappearance of the majority of the characters.

There are ten main characters. They include:

Lupita, the red Lunni; Lublú, the blue Lunni; Lucho, the yellow Lunni; Lulila, the lilac Lunni; Lubina, the oldest Lunni; Professor Lutecio, a scatterbrained Lunni scientist; Lulo, a teenaged Lunni that always wears his hat backwards; Lula, another teenaged Lunni who is the pilot of their spaceship; Lumbrela, a middle aged teacher; and Lunicef, superhero that works with UNICEF to make the world a better place.

Beside the Lunnis, there are various regular human characters as well. Lucrecia was the host of the show starting in September 2003 until March 2009, and once again starting in 2016. Since then, she has hosted Lunnis de leyenda (Lunnis of Legend), a miniseries that tells the story of a historical event or legend, followed by a song that summarizes it. She is one of the Lunnis' best friends. Àlex Casademunt, known on the show as Alex, was a host on the show in 2003 and 2004, and Lula was in love with him. Sergio Mur López, known on the show as Sergio, was a host on the show from 2004 until 2007, and he was Lucrecia's friend.

== Broadcast ==
- It is broadcast in Mexico by Canal 5 of Televisa, and in Chile by the Canal Regional de Concepción.
- From September 2007, it was broadcast in Italy by Rai 2.
- In Brazil, it is aired on Futura.
- In Portugal, the show was aired on RTP.

== Awards and other participations ==
- The episode "Lulanieves" written by Daniel Cerdà and made by Joan Albert Planell wins the 1st Prize of the «Prix Jeunesse Iberoamericano 2005»., in the section of fiction for readers from birth to 6 years.
- One of the puppets, Lucho, was the Spanish spokesperson at the Junior Eurovision Song Contest 2004.
- In 2006 it is chosen by the organisation of the Emmys as the best European children's show, thus being nominated for the prize. Besides it was shortlisted for the Japan Prize 2006 that celebrated to finals of the month of October of that same year in Shibuya.
- In 2007 the Lunnis collaborated with the General Direction of Traffic in a campaign of traffic education that was issued with the aim to teach to the boys norms of behaviour, as much as pedestrians, like users of car. The title of the series of 13 episodes was "The Lunnis: Traffic Security " and received in Hamburg, the World Media Festival silver prize, in the section of preschool education.

== Discography ==
1. Nos vamos a la cama (Sony 2003)
2. Vacaciones con Los Lunnis (Sony 2004)
3. Navidad con Los Lunnis (Sony 2004)
4. ¡Despierta ya! (Sony 2004)
5. Cumple Cumpleaños (Sony & BMG 2005)
6. Dame tu Mano, La Canción del Verano (Sony & BMG 2007)
7. La Fiesta del Verano (Sony & BMG 2008)
8. Mis amigos del mundo (Sony & BMG 2008)
9. Los Lunnis con María Isabel (Universal 2009)
