= Carmen Vidal =

Spanish cosmetologist and business person

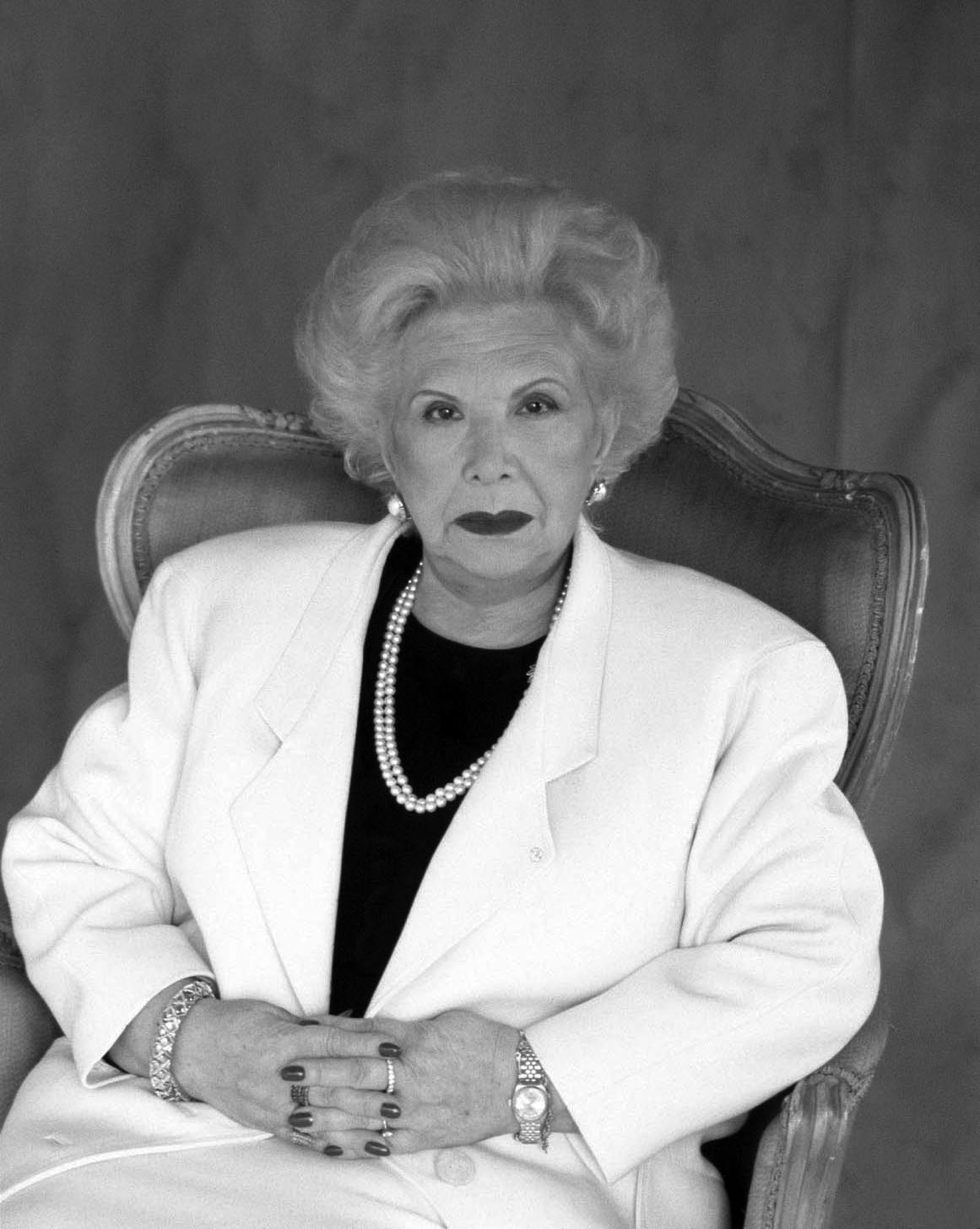
- Born: 28 June 1915; Réghaïa, Algeria
- Died: 10 February 2003 (aged 87); Alcoi, Spain
- Occupations: cosmetologist, businesswoman
- Spouse: Vicente Vidal
- Children: 4

Carmen Vidal (28 June 1915 - 10 February 2003) was a Spanish cosmetologist and business person. She was the founder of the firm Germaine de Capuccini, a prestigious cosmetics company.

== Biography ==
Carmen Vidal was born in Réghaïa, a town which is situated in the north of Algeria on the 28th of June, 1915 to Spanish parents. She lived in Algeria for some time before travelling to Paris; she lived in Algeria until the 1940s when it was under French colonisation. She graduated from the Medical University of Algeria. Vidal was enticed by beauty and fashion ever since her childhood.

== Career ==
In the early 1950s, Vidal returned to Algeria, where she worked as a personal assistant to Madame Fabré, an aesthetician. In 1962, she settled in France where she established a laboratory in Paris.

Vidal left Paris to establish a professional cosmetics company in her native country of Spain in 1964, and named the company Germaine de Capuccini. She named it using the French name of Germaine and after Capucine, who was a popular French actress and a model in the 1960s. Germaine de Capuccini has grown into a successful cosmetics firm and has been established in around 80 nations. Vidal has played a key role in the development of the company since its establishment.
