= Métrika =

Spanish songwriter and rapper

Thais Amores García (Castellón, November 23, 2003), known professionally as Metrika, is a Spanish songwriter and rapper, known for her music inspired by sexual and female empowering topics.

== Early life and career ==
The daughter of a disc jockey, Metrika became interested in music at an early age, especially in trap from the age of 13, later discovering autotune. At that same age she decided to start competing in trap battles, but decided to stop due to anxiety. She also affirmed that the trap scene in Spain was deeply toxic and misogynist, and that all the spaces of power were dominated by men.

Soon after, she began to record her own songs at home, and at the age of 15 she bought her first studio, with which she continued experimenting and recording her songs. In 2020 she released her first single as a singer "X Money" and by 2021 she had already performed in Castellón and Burriana, and in November of that same year she released "Tra Tra", which would be the first song she would release with the producer D. Basto with whom she began to record and compose. Between 2022 and 2023 she released her first EP's: Fiat Vountas Tua and La Minimixxxtape De Las Zorras y Ceremonia with songs like "Pabajo", "La Zorra De Tu Novia", "Toy Boy", "Folklórica" and "Llorando Rímmel".

In June 2023, Metrika released her fourth EP called Femme Fatale, which included popular tracks such as "Ya T Has Corrido?", "Su Alma," and "Driving Brusco Remix", featuring artist l0rna. Around the same time, she collaborated with other Spanish urban artists, Kristina and Daniel Garsal, on the song "Queens League". In April 2024, she released her first album, titled Madre Fundadora, which featured songs like "Hello Diky", "All Dikys Eyez On Me", "Barbietúricos", "Ave María Putísima", and "Semen Up", the latter in collaboration with artist Glory Six Vain, and "El Infierno", featuring rapper Nieto666. She embarked on the "Madre Fundadora Tour," which concluded in Barcelona in February the following year. In October 2024, she released her fifth EP, El Grimorio, featuring tracks like "Susi-Ah" with rapper Tito ACK and "Dabelremix" with l0rna. In 2025, she announced her upcoming album and released songs like "Totaína" featuring Euskoprincess and Main Costa, and "Fumo Escarcha" with Serchito trambótico and producer Dona1re.

== Personal life ==
Metrika is bisexual. Even though she was raised as a Christian, she identifies as a satanist, which generated criticism.
