= Luis Lorenzo Crespo =

Spanish actor and television presenter

- Born: 24 July 1960 (age 65); Spain
- Occupation: Actor
- Years active: 1992-present

Luis Lorenzo Crespo (Madrid, July 24, 1960) is a Spanish actor and television presenter.

His professional career began as a television presenter accompanying Italian presenter Raffaella Carrá in the magazine ¡Hola Rafaella! between 1992 and 1994. At the same time, he made his first job as an actor in front of the camera in Para Elisa (1993), a TV series for TVE starring Assumpta Serna and Tito Valverde.

Once the Raffaella Carrá program ended, he accompanied Bárbara Rey for two seasons in another musical TV program Esto es espectáculo (1995-1996).

His later career has focused on acting, appearing mainly on television, first in the TV series Jacinto Durante, representante (2000) and then as part of the cast of various soap operas such as Al salir de clase (1998-2002), El secreto (2001), Paraíso (2003) and Obsesión (2005). He also appeared in series such as El comisario (2003-2007), Yo soy Bea (2008) and later La que se avecina where he played Ferrán Barreiros, a rival of Antonio Recio (Jordi Sánchez)

In 2004 he participated as a contestant in the third edition of the Spanish version of the reality show Survivor, on Antena 3.

On May 27, 2022, he was arrested alongside his wife, accused of poisoning an aunt of the actor's wife who died in June 2021, in order to seize her inheritance. However, a forensic report commissioned by the judge investigating the case rules out death due to poisoning and points to natural causes as the most probable reason for the death of the actor's aunt-in-law.
