= Lucrecia (singer) =

Cuban singer and actress

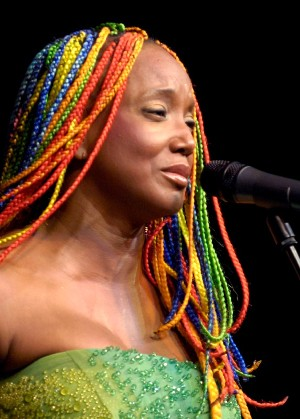
- Lucrecia in March 2009
- Born: Lucrecia Pérez Sáez; Havana, Cuba
- Citizenship: Cuban; Spanish
- Years active: 1980s–present
- Website: http://www.lucreciamusic.com

Lucrecia Pérez Sáez is a Cuban singer and actress based in Spain. She has worked in various movies and with several long established artists, including Celia Cruz, Chavela Vargas, Joaquín Sabina, Andy Garcia, Manzanita and Lluís Llach.

== Early life and career ==
At the early age of seven, Lucrecia began studying piano and music and was certified with a specialty in piano at the Instituto Superior de Arte de Cuba. She studied singing with Isolina Carrillo, the composer of the famous bolero "Dos Gardenias", popularized in Spain by Cuban singer Antonio Machín.

Soon after completing her education, Lucrecia joined La Orquesta Anacaona, an all-female group which, since its founding in 1932, had become a Cuban institution. In the 1980s and early 1990s, she made several international tours with the group.

It was with Anacaona, as lead vocalist, keyboardist and arranger, that Lucrecia first arrived in Spain. Later, in 1993, she left Anacaona and returned to settle in Barcelona, where she has remained. Since establishing her solo career there, she has become very active in Spanish film and television as well as the music scene. Though not yet well known in the English-speaking world, she is a celebrated figure not only in Spain and, increasingly, in Latin America and the Hispanic community of the United States.

Although she personally eschews such comparisons, Lucrecia has been touted as a successor to the great Celia Cruz, with whom she was a close friend.

Lucrecia's 2010 Álbum de Cuba was nominated for Best Contemporary Tropical Album in the 2010 Latin Grammy Awards.

Since leaving Anacaona and becoming an expatriate of Cuba, the Cuban government has not allowed her to return, but she was able to bring her mother to Barcelona, which they both make their permanent home. Through the length of her career, Lucrecia has collaborated or performed with numerous masters of the art, including Celia Cruz, Paquito D’Rivera, Chano Domínguez, Joaquín Sabina, Wyclef Jean, Carlos "Patato" Valdes, Carel Kraayenhof, Willy Chirino, Chavela Vargas, Lluís Llach, Gilberto Gil, Israel "Cachao" López, Andy García, Carlos Jean, Nuno da Câmara Pereira (Portuguese Fado singer, Nuno da Câmara Pereira, etc.

Among her collaborations should be noted Cachao: The Last Mambo, a winning album at the Latin Grammy awards in 2011 and for the 2012 Grammy Awards. Based on a memorable concert recorded live in Miami in September 2007, the album was as tribute to Israel "Cachao" Lopez celebrating the 80-year musical career of that great master.

As an artist, Lucrecia has combined her musical side with television, having been involved in programs of considerable success in Spain. On Televisión Española, she was host of the successful children's program Los Lunnis. Lucrecia has also demonstrated her facet as a writer. In 2004, she made her debut as a writer of children's stories with “Besitos de chocolate” (Little Chocolate Kisses) ( "Tales of my childhood"), after which have followed two more books from the same collection: The Valley of the Tenderness (2005) and All the Colors of the World (2008), all in collaboration with Los Lunnis. Continuing in this vein, she has edited her disk and video La Casita de Lucrecia.

In June 2012 she began the tour "Eternally Cuba".

In 2019, Lucrecia starred in Celia: El Musical, a musical about the life of Celia Cruz, at the Lehman Arts Center.

== Filmography ==
- Segunda piel (1999) by Gerardo Vera, singing her song Youkali.
- Ataque verbal (1999) by Miguel Albaladejo, as an actress.
- Balseros (2002), by Carles Boch and Josep Maria Domènech, original soundtrack.
- El gran gato (2003) by Ventura Pons, singing "Barca, cielo y ola" as a tribute to Gato Pérez.
- Los Lunnis (2003–2009), RTVE program, as an actress.

== Discography ==
ALBUMS

- De Mil Maneras (In a Thousand Ways), 2021
- La Casita de Lucrecia (Lucrecia's Little House), 2010
- Álbum de Cuba (Album of Cuba), 2009
- Mira las luces (Look at the lights), 2005
- Agua (Water), 2002
- Cubáname (Cubanize me), 1999
- Pronósticos (Forecasts), 1997
- Prohibido (Forbidden), 1996
- Mis Boleros (My Boleros), 1996
- Me debes un beso (You owe me a kiss), 1994 (Lucrecia y su Orquesta)

DIGITAL ALBUMS

- Lucrecia canta a Machín (Lucrecia sings to Machín), 2022
- Lucrecia Ama Galicia (Lucrecia Loves Galicia), 2021

COLLABORATION ALBUMS

- 3 Generations of Cuban Musicians, 2004
- Concierto de las Dos Orillas (Concert of the Two Shores), 1996 (Lucrecia y su Orquesta)

SINGLES

- Aguas De Março (Waters of March) - Andreu Muntaner Lobo feat. Lucrecia, 2008
- Desafinado (Off-key) - Ana Belén, Carmen París, Lolita, Lucrecia, Pastora Soler, 2005
- ¿Que Diferencia Hay? (What difference is there?), 2004
- Un Día Más Sin Ti (One More Day Without You) - Version with Antonio Carmona, 2003
- Mi Gente Remix (My People Remix), 2002
- Que Llueva (Let it rain), 2002
- Mi Gente (My People), 2002
- Nunca Más (Never Again), 2000
- Ampárame (Protect me), 2000
- La Noche de la Iguana (The Night of the Iguana), 1999
- Cubáname (Cubanize me), 1999
- Santa Tierra (Holy Land), 1999
- Un carro, Una casa, Una buena mujer (A car, A house, A good woman), 1998
- Serpiente Cascabel (Rattlesnake), 1997

MAXI, EP's

- Agua - Remezclas (Water - Remixes), 2003
- Ampárame - Remixes (Protect me - Remixes), 2000
- Lucrecia y Bacardi (Lucrecia and Bacardi), 1998

DIGITAL SINGLES

- Guayabera de Melao (Melao Guayabera), 2025
- Óyeme Guajiro (Listen to me, Guajiro), 2025
- MALA FAMA (Bad Reputation) feat. Yumitus Hernández, 2024
- AMOR PURO (Pure Love), 2024
- MI ZURRÓN MIX (My Mixed Sack), 2023
- Fiesta - Versión Café Olé (Party - Café Olé Version), 2023
- Fiesta (Party), 2023
- Un carro, Una casa y Una buena mujer (A car, a house and a good woman), 2023
- Coquini Coco, 2023
- Mi Gente - Salsa (My People - Salsa), 2023
- Dos Gardenias (Two Gardenias) feat. Antonio Machín, 2022
- Es El Moment (It's the moment), 2021
- Mi Gente - Remix (My People - Remix) feat. Ariel de Cuba, 2021
- Latinoamericando Voy (Latin Americanizing I go), 2021
- La vida es un Carnaval (Life is a Carnival), 2016
- Que Baile el Papa (Let the Pope Dance), 2014

DIGITAL EP's

- Ensoñación (Daydreaming), 2020

COLLABORATIONS

== Books ==
- Besitos de Chocolate para Toda la Familia (Chocolate Little Kisses for the Whole Family) +CD (2015/02/04)
- Lucrecia y Los Lunnis - Besitos de Chocolate: Todos los colores del mundo (Lucrecia and Los Lunnis - Chocolate Little Kisses: All the colors of the world) +CD (2008/03/01)
- Besitos de Chocolate: El valle de la ternura (Chocolate Little Kisses: The Valley of Tenderness) +CD (2005/10/01)
- Besitos de Chocolate: Cuentos de mi infancia (Chocolate Little Kisses: Remembrances from my Childhood) +CD (2004/12/03)
- Besitos de Chocolate: Cuentos de mi infancia (Chocolate Little Kisses: Remembrances from my Childhood), 2004/04/07

== Nominations and awards ==
- Music Award for the song 'My People' from the album 'Agua', SGAE, in the 2003 Edition, "Best Theme of Electronic Music Dance and Hip Hop".
- Three TP gold awards for the program "Los Lunnis" of TVE.
- Golden microphone of the programme protagonists of Luis del Olmo.
- Nomination for the 2003 Oscars for the film documentary of TV3's "Balsero"
- An EMMY Nomination for her interview in the program "Speaking with the Stars" with Television Mega Latina in Miami.
- Nominated for the 2010 Latin Grammy Awards, category Best Tropical Music Album "Álbum de Cuba".
- Winner of the Latin Grammy Awards and Grammy Awards 2012 for her interpretation of "Dos Gardenias" in the album "The Last Mambo," a tribute to bassist and creator of Mambo, Israel "Cachao" López.
