= Jorge Martínez Reverte =

Spanish writer and journalist (1948–2021)

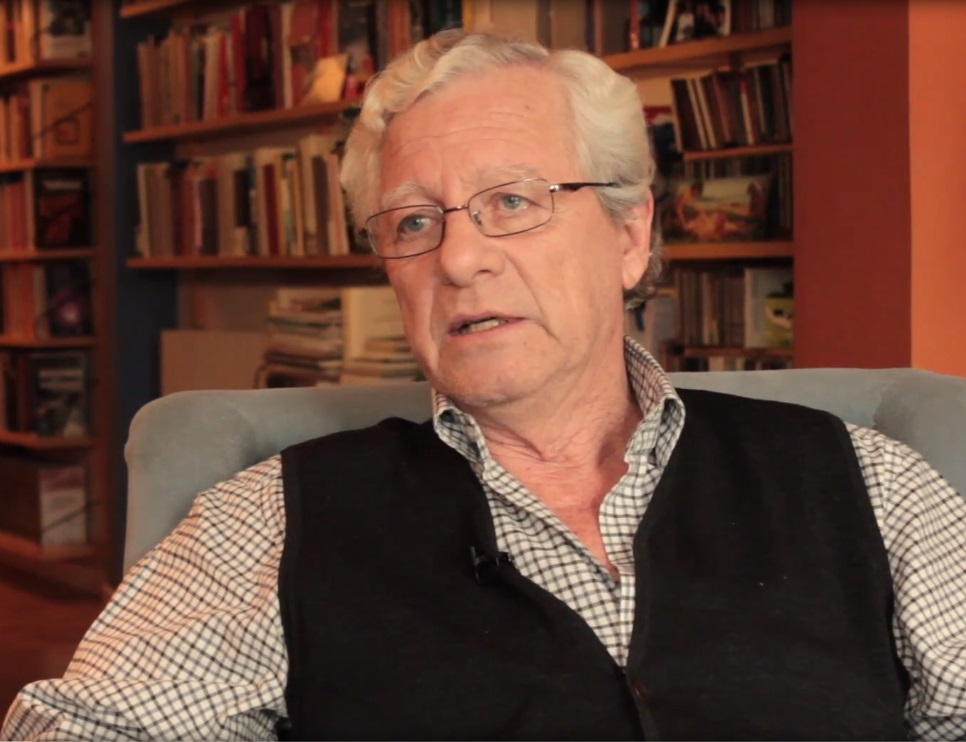
- Born: September 28, 1948
- Died: March 24, 2021 (aged 72); Madrid, Spain

Jorge Martínez Reverte (28 September 1948 – 24 March 2021) was a Spanish writer, journalist, and historian, specializing in the Spanish Civil War.
