= Jaime Allende =

Spanish field hockey player (1924–2003)

Personal information
- Full name: Jaime Allende Maíz
- Born: 27 July 1924
- Died: 19 October 2003 (aged 79)

Jaime Allende Maíz (Note: In this Spanish name, the first or paternal surname is Allende and the second or maternal family name is Maíz.) (27 July 1924 – 19 October 2003) was a Spanish field hockey player who competed in the 1948 Summer Olympics. He was a member of the Spanish field hockey team, which was eliminated in the group stage. He played all three matches as forward in the 1948 tournament.
