= Fernando Argenta =

Spanish writer, journalist, musician and presenter (1945–2013)

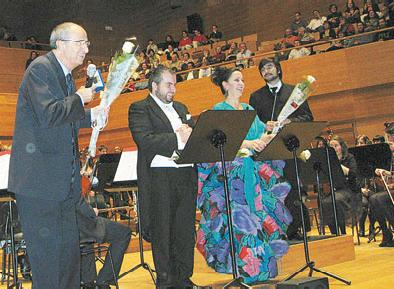
- Fernando Argenta (far left) in 2009.
- Born: Fernando Martín de Argenta Pallarés; 4 July 1945; Madrid, Spain
- Died: 3 December 2013 (aged 68); Boadilla del Monte, Community of Madrid, Spain
- Occupations: Writer, journalist, musician, presenter
- Years active: 1976–2008

Fernando Martín de Argenta Pallarés (4 July 1945 – 3 December 2013) was a Spanish writer, journalist, musician and presenter of radio and television.

Born in Madrid, the son of conductor and pianist Ataúlfo Argenta, Argenta completed advanced studies in music at the Madrid Royal Conservatory, he combined activity with the Bachelor of Law from the Complutense University of Madrid. In his youth, he was a member of the rock band Micky and The Tonys, which he left in 1965 to fulfill the military service.

In 1976, Argenta began working at Radio Nacional de España (RNE), the station that ran the program Popular Classics.

In 2003, 2004 and 2006, he was the commentator of RTVE in the Junior Eurovision Song Contest held in Copenhagen (Denmark), Lillehammer (Norway) and Bucharest (Romania), respectively.

Fernando Argenta died of pancreatic cancer on 3 December 2013, aged 68, in Boadilla del Monte, Community of Madrid.
