= Informe Semanal =

Spanish television news magazine (1973–)

- Genre: News magazine
- Created by: Pedro Erquicia
- Directed by: José Carlos Gallardo Corullón
- Presented by: Lourdes Maldonado
- Country of origin: Spain
- Original language: Spanish
- No. of seasons: 53

Production
- Running time: 60 minutes

Original release
- Network: La 1 (TVE)
- Release: 31 March 1973 – present

Informe Semanal (lit. transl. Weekly Report) is a weekly Spanish television news magazine broadcast on La 1 of Televisión Española (TVE). Debuting on 31 March 1973, it is the second longest-running national television program in the history of television in Spain, just behind the daily newscast Telediario, on air since 15 September 1957. (Note: Some current programs in TVE's regional variations are older than Informe Semanal such as the Canarian regional newscast Telecanarias on air since 26 April 1971, or the regional musical program Tenderete on air since 7 September 1971.)

Informe Semanal is produced by Televisión Española news services and besides on La 1, it is broadcast on 24 Horas news channel, on TVE Internacional and on RTVE Play. Previous editions are also available on the online platform on demand.

With 53 years on air, it is referred as the milestone television news magazine in Europe and it is Televisión Española's most awarded program.

== Format ==
The program's format is based on the American program 60 Minutes from CBS, that consists of four reports about themes as current affairs, economy, politics, society and culture. Each report lasts around 10–15 minutes.

== History ==
Informe Semanal started broadcast on 31 March 1973, then titled Semanal Informativo and hosted by José Antonio Silva and directed by Pedro Erquicia. Since then they have issued more than 6,000 reports.

In 1978 Erquicia left the direction of the program and was replaced by Jorge Martínez Reverte and for some time the format was changed and live interviews were featured.

In January 2021, the journalist Cristina Olea interviewed former US President Barack Obama for Informe Semanal.

== Directors ==
- Pedro Erquicia (1973–1978)
- Rafael Martínez-Durbán (1978–1981)
- Ramón Colom (1981–1987)
- Jorge Martínez Reverte (1988)
- Baltasar Magro (1988–1989)
- María Antonia Iglesias (1989–1990)
- Elena Martí (1990)
- Ana Ramírez Cañil (1990–1991)
- Fernando López Agudín (1991–1994)
- Manuel Sánchez Pereira (1994–1996)
- Baltasar Magro (1996–2004)
- Alicia Gómez Montano (2004–2012)
- Jenaro Castro (2012–2018)
- Óscar González Fernández (2018–2022)
- José Carlos Gallardo Corullón (2022–present)

== Hosts ==
- José Antonio Silva (1973–1975)
- Pedro Erquicia (1976–1978)
- Rosa María Mateo (1975–1980)
- Adela Cantalapiedra (1980–1981)
- Ramón Colom (1981–1983)
- Mari Carmen García Vela (1983–1996)
- Georgina Cisquella (1996)
- Baltasar Magro (1996–2000)
- Almudena Ariza (2000–2001)
- Letizia Ortiz (2001)
- Baltasar Magro (2001–2004)
- Pilar García Muñiz (2004)
- Alicia Gómez Montano (2004–2005)
- Beatriz Ariño (2005–2007)
- Beatriz Ariño, María Casado, Ana Blanco, Lorenzo Milá, David Cantero, Ana Pastor, and Pepa Bueno (2007–2009)
- David Cantero (2009–2010)
- Ana Roldán (2010–2012)
- Olga Lambea (2012–2020)
- Marisa Rodríguez Palop (2020–2022)
- Álex Barreiro (2023)
- Ana Blanco (2023–2024)
- Lara Siscar (2024–2025)
