= 1808 in Spain =

- Decades: 1780s; 1790s; 1800s; 1810s; 1820s
- See also: History of Spain; Timeline of Spanish history; List of years in Spain

Events from the year 1808 in Spain.

== Incumbents ==
- Monarch: Charles IV until March 19, Ferdinand VII until May 6, Joseph I since June 6
- Prime Minister - Pedro Cevallos until March 3, Gonzalo O'Farrill until March 19, Pedro Cevallos until July 7, Mariano Luis de Urquijo since July 7

== Events ==
- May 2 - Dos de Mayo Uprising
- June 5 - Uprising of Santa Cruz de Mudela
- June 6 - Valdepeñas Uprising and 1st Combat of El Bruch
- June 7 - Battle of Alcolea Bridge
- June 9–14 - Capture of the Rosily Squadron
- June 12 - Battle of Cabezón
- June 14 - 2nd Combat of El Bruch
- June 15-August 14 - First Siege of Zaragoza
- June 20–21 - Battle of Gerona (1808)
- June 24–26 - Battle of Valencia (1808)
- July 14 - Battle of Medina de Rioseco
- July 16–19 - Battle of Bailén
- July 24-August 16 - Second Siege of Gerona
- October 31 - Battle of Zornoza
- November 7-December 5 - Siege of Roses (1808)

== Deaths ==
- May 2 - Pedro Velarde y Santillán and Luis Daoíz y Torres
- May 29 - Francisco Solano (soldier)
- Vincente Maria de Acevedo

== See also ==
- Peninsular War

== Bibliography ==
- Chandler, David G. The Campaigns of Napoleon, (New York: Simon & Schuster, 1995). ISBN 0-02-523660-1
- Esdaile, Charles J. The Peninsular War, (Penguin Books, Paperback, 2003), 640 pages, ISBN 978-0140273700.
- Glover, Michael. The Peninsular War 1807-1814, (Penguin Books 2003). ISBN 0-14-139041-7
