= 1812 in Spain =

- Decades: 1790s; 1800s; 1810s; 1820s; 1830s
- See also: History of Spain; Timeline of Spanish history; List of years in Spain

Events from the year 1812 in Spain.

== Incumbents ==
- Monarch: Joseph I
- Prime Minister - Mariano Luis de Urquijo

== Events ==
- January 7–20 - Siege of Ciudad Rodrigo (1812)
- March 16-April 6 - Siege of Badajoz (1812)
- March 19 - ratification of the Spanish Constitution of 1812
- April 9 - Battle of Arlabán (1812)
- June 29-August 19 - Siege of Astorga (1812)
- July 22 - Battle of Salamanca
- October 25–29 - Battle of Tordesillas (1812)

== Births ==
- April 23 - Alejandro de Castro y Casal

== Deaths ==
- July 4 - Infante Pedro Carlos of Spain and Portugal
