= 1813 in Spain =

- Decades: 1790s; 1800s; 1810s; 1820s; 1830s
- See also: History of Spain; Timeline of Spanish history; List of years in Spain

Events from the year 1813 in Spain.

== Incumbents ==
- Monarch: Joseph I until 19 March, Ferdinand VII from December
- Prime Minister - Mariano Luis de Urquijo until June 27, Juan O'Donojú until October 17, Fernando de Laserna until December 3, José Luyando from December 3

== Events ==
- June 3–11 – Siege of Tarragona (1813)
- June 21 – Battle of Vitoria
- June 25 – Battle of Tolosa (1813)
- July 25 – Battle of Roncesvalles (1813)

== Births ==
=== Full date unknown ===
- José Manuel Aguirre Miramón, jurist, politician and writer (died 1887)

== Deaths ==
- 215000 to 375000 military and civilian dead from the peninsular war.

== See also ==
- Peninsular War
