= Gonzalo O'Farrill =

Spanish soldier and politician

The Most Excellent Gonzalo O'Farrill
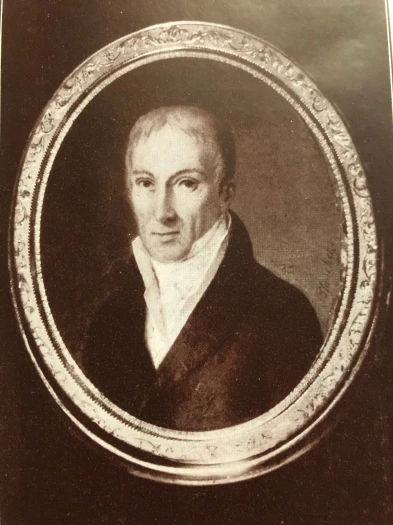

Prime Minister of Spain
- In office 3 March 1808 – 19 March 1808
- Monarch: Charles IV
- Preceded by: Pedro Cevallos
- Succeeded by: Pedro Cevallos

Personal details
- Born: Gonzalo O'Farrill y Herrera; 1754 Havana, Cuba
- Died: 1831 (aged 76–77) Paris, France

Gonzalo O'Farrill y Herrera (1754–1831) was a Spanish soldier and politician.

== Biography ==
He was born in Havana, Cuba, as the son of Ricardo José O'Farrill y Arriola of Irish descent. (Note: The former palace of the O´Farrill family in Havana, Cuba is now a hotel. They were Irish Catholics settled in Cuba by the British Crown in 1713 under the Treaty of Utrecht, as agents for the slave trade, importing Africans to work in Cuban sugar fields. See: https://hotelpalacioofarrill.com-cuba.com/) His great-grandfather was Richard O'Farrill who was born in Derry around 1640, but emigrated to Montserrat around 1667.
In Spain, Gonzalo became (at the time of King Carlos IV of Spain), a lieutenant general of the Royal Spanish Army, Director of the Military College at Puerto de Santa María, Cádiz, Spain, and a Plenipotentiary Minister representing Spain in the Kingdom of Prussia under King Frederic. He was also a member and President of the Supreme Joint Council of Spain when King Carlos IV went to Bayonne, France, to meet with Napoleon I Bonaparte around March 1808.

Minister of War under King Carlos IV of Spain, he was for a few days (3–19 March 1808), between two spells in power of Pedro Cevallos, Prime Minister of Spain under King José I Bonaparte. He remained Minister of War under Bonaparte.
After the collapse of French power in Spain, he emigrated to France and had all his properties in Cuba confiscated.
He died in 1831 and is buried in the Père Lachaise Cemetery.

He had married a widow, Ana Rodríguez de Carassa who already had a child, Pedro Miguel Sáenz de Santa María y Carassa.

=== Don Gonzalo O'Farrill, the uncle of "la Bella Condesa Cubana" Maria Theresa ===
The daughter of his sister María-Josefa Josefa O'Farrill y Herrera was the sensual Cuban lady, Maria Teresa Montalvo y O'Farrill, (1771–1812), She became a widow in 1807, aged 36 with two very young daughters, described as the "Santa Cruz" girls, and moved to Madrid. Her Literary Salon at Madrid became very popular with visitors such as the poet Manuel José Quintana and the famous painter Francisco de Goya.

It is said that at the time she was supposed to be the Spanish love of the new Bonaparte family King of Spain, José I Bonaparte, whose wife, Julie Clary, apparently preferred a less risky position and stayed in France with their two daughters.

Maria Teresa Montalvo y O'Farrill died in 1812. The next year when Napoleonic troops suffered successive defeats, her two daughters together with their great uncle Gonzalo O´Farrill, left for Paris. Mercedes Santa Cruz y Montalvo had married around October 1809, aged 20, with French invading General Christophe Antoine Merlin, then in his early forties, who was Captain General of the Spanish Royal Guards two months before their wedding. Her sister María Josefa de Santa Cruz y Montalvo was married to another "Afrancesado", Pedro Miguel Sáenz de Santa María y Carassa, the step son of General Gonzalo O'Farrill y Herrera, and a member of the State Council of the "new King" José I.

=== Don Gonzalo O'Farrill, the great uncle of María de las Mercedes Santa Cruz y Montalvo ===
Maria Mercedes left her husband French General Christophe Antoine Merlin and had an affair with Philarète Chasles. She also played hostess to French intellectuals.

Her translation into Spanish from the French of "Viaje a La Habana" had a prologue by the notorious Spanish-Cuban romantic school poet Gertrudis Gomez de Avellaneda, then living in Spain. However her hopes of getting back land, money, houses and titles confiscated by the Spanish Bourbons while she lived in exile, in particular, her appeals around 1845 to Queen Isabella II of Spain for restoration of her titles and properties did not lead anywhere.

== See also ==
- List of prime ministers of Spain

== Notes ==
Political offices
Preceded by Pedro Cevallos	Secretary of State (Chief Minister); 1808–1808	Succeeded by Pedro Cevallos
