= 1811 in Spain =

- Decades: 1790s; 1800s; 1810s; 1820s; 1830s
- See also: History of Spain; Timeline of Spanish history; List of years in Spain

Events from the year 1811 in Spain.

== Incumbents ==
- Monarch: Joseph I
- Prime Minister - Mariano Luis de Urquijo

== Events ==
- January 15 - Battle of Pla (1811)
- April 22-May 12 - First Siege of Badajoz (1811)
- May 5-June 29 - Siege of Tarragona (1811)
- May 18-June 10 - Second Siege of Badajoz (1811)

== Births ==
- January 28 – Fèlix Maria Falguera, jurist (died 1897)
- November 4 – Infante Sebastian of Portugal and Spain

== Deaths ==
- January 23 - Pedro Caro, 3rd Marquis of la Romana
- March 3 - Rafael Menacho
- November 26 - Gregorio García de la Cuesta
- José María de la Cueva, 14th Duke of Alburquerque
