= 1803 in Spain =

- Decades: 1780s; 1790s; 1800s; 1810s; 1820s
- See also: History of Spain; Timeline of Spanish history; List of years in Spain

Events from the year 1803 in Spain

== Incumbents ==
- Monarch – Charles IV
- Prime Minister - Pedro Cevallos

== Events ==
The members of the Royal Botanical Expedition to New Spain finally returned to Spain at different times during 1803. This scientific expedition explored the flora and fauna of the territories of New Spain between 1787 and 1803.

== Births ==
- - Pedro de Alcántara Álvarez de Toledo, 13th Marquis of Villafranca

== Deaths ==
- 1 February – María Isidra de Guzmán y de la Cerda, scholar (born 1768)
- - José Camarón Bonanat
