= Miramón =

Miramón is a Spanish and French surname. Notable people with the surname include:

- Ignacio Miramón (born 2003), Argentine footballer
- Jorge Miramón (born 1989), Spanish footballer
- José Manuel Aguirre Miramón (1813–1887), Spanish jurist, politician and writer
- Manuel Panaro Miramón (born 2002), Argentine footballer
- Miguel Miramón (1831–1867), former president of Mexico and general of the Reform War
