= 1806 in Spain =

- Decades: 1780s; 1790s; 1800s; 1810s; 1820s
- See also: History of Spain; Timeline of Spanish history; List of years in Spain

Events from the year 1806 in Spain

== Incumbents ==
- Monarch – Charles IV
- Prime Minister - Pedro Cevallos

== Events ==
- The Capture of El Maragato

== Births ==
- January 27 – Juan Crisóstomo Arriaga, Spanish composer (d. 1826)
- March 8 - Antonio María Esquivel, a Spanish painter.
- April 27 - Maria Christina of the Two Sicilies.

== Deaths ==
- Federico Gravina
- - Manuel Abad y Lasierra
