= Falguera =

Falguera may refer to:

- Petrocoptis pseudoviscosa, "falguera", species in the plant family Caryophyllaceae, endemic to the Spanish province of Huesca
- Fèlix Maria Falguera, Spanish jurist
- Antoni de Falguera, Catalan architect
- Álex Gallar Falguera, Spanish footballer
- Íñigo de Arteaga y Falguera, 18th Duke of the Infantado, Spanish peer

== See also ==
- Margarita Salas Falgueras, Spanish scientist, 1st Marchioness of Canero
