= 1810 in Spain =

- Decades: 1790s; 1800s; 1810s; 1820s; 1830s
- See also: History of Spain; Timeline of Spanish history; List of years in Spain

Events from the year 1810 in Spain.

== Incumbents ==
- Monarch: Joseph I
- Prime Minister - Mariano Luis de Urquijo

== Events ==
- April 26-July 9 - Siege of Ciudad Rodrigo: French Marshal Michel Ney takes the fortified city from Field Marshal Don Andrés Perez de Herrasti
- July 11 - Combat of Barquilla: Robert Craufurd attacks French grenadiers covering a foraging party. The French grenadiers make a fighting withdrawal and escape unscathed.
- September 14 - Battle of La Bisbal: A Spanish division led by Henry O'Donnell (also known as Enrique José O'Donnell) and supported by an Anglo-Spanish naval squadron led by Francis William Fane and Charles William Doyle surprises an Imperial French brigade commanded by François Xavier de Schwarz.
- September 16 - The Mexican War of Independence begins with the "Grito de Dolores", as Miguel Hidalgo y Costilla and fellow rebels take up arms against the Spanish colonial authorities.

== Births ==
- August 28 - Jaime Balmes, priest and philosopher (died 1848)
- December 17 - Francisco Serrano, 1st Duke of la Torre

== Deaths ==
- January 21 - Mariano Álvarez de Castro, military governor (born 1749)
