= 1809 in Spain =

- Decades: 1780s; 1790s; 1800s; 1810s; 1820s
- See also: History of Spain; Timeline of Spanish history; List of years in Spain

Events from the year 1809 in Spain.

== Incumbents ==
- Monarch: Joseph I
- Prime Minister - Mariano Luis de Urquijo

== Events ==
- January 1 - Battle of Castellón
- January 3 - Battle of Cacabelos
- January 13 - Battle of Uclés (1809)
- January 16 - Battle of Corunna
- February 25 - Battle of Valls
- March 17 - Battle of Villafranca (1809)
- March 24 - Battle of Los Yébenes
- March 27 - Battle of Ciudad Real
- March 28 - Battle of Medellín
- May 6-December 12 - Third Siege of Gerona
- May 14 - Battle of Alcantara (1809)
- May 23 - Battle of Alcañiz
- June 7–9 - Battle of Puente Sanpayo
- June 15 - Battle of María
- June 18 - Battle of Belchite (1809)
- July 27–28 - Battle of Talavera
- August 8 - Battle of Arzobispo
- August 11 - Battle of Almonacid
- August 12 - Battle of Puerto de Baños
- October 18 - Battle of Tamames
- November 19 - Battle of Ocaña
- November 23 - Battle of Carpio
- November 26 - Battle of Alba de Tormes

== Births ==
- January 12 - Leopoldo O'Donnell, 1st Duke of Tetuan (d. 1867)

== Deaths ==
- January 7 - Benito de San Juan
- January 18 - Francisco Taranco y Llano
- February 24 - Juan O'Neylle
- April 23 - Theodor von Reding
- April 24 - Juan Miguel de Vives y Feliu

== See also ==
- Peninsular War
