= 1746 in Spain =

- Decades: 1720s; 1730s; 1740s; 1750s; 1760s
- See also: History of Spain; Timeline of Spanish history; List of years in Spain

Events from the year 1746 in Spain.

== Incumbents ==
- Monarch - Philip V until July 9, Ferdinand VI starting July 9
- First Secretary of State - Sebastián de la Cuadra until December 4, José de Carvajal starting December 4

== Deaths ==
- 28 June - Andrés Fernández Pacheco, 10th Duke of Escalona, grandee and academician. (b. 1710)
- July 9 - Philip V of Spain (b. 1683)
