= 1797 in Spain =

- Decades: 1770s; 1780s; 1790s; 1800s; 1810s
- See also: History of Spain; Timeline of Spanish history; List of years in Spain

Events from the year 1797 in Spain

== Incumbents ==
- Monarch – Charles IV

== Events ==
- Guantánamo was founded in 1797.

=== February ===
- Battle of Cape St. Vincent (1797), one of the opening battles of the Anglo-Spanish War (1796–1808), resulting in a British victory under Sir John Jervis.
- 1797 Riobamba earthquake, a deadly earthquake causing between 6,000 and 40,000 casualties in the Riomba and surrounding Interandean valley. The epicenter reached at least XI (Extreme) on the Mercalli intensity scale. This is the most powerful historical event in Ecuador.

=== June ===
- Mission San José (California), the fourteenth historic Spanish mission located in the present-day city of Fremont, California by the Franciscan order on June 11, 1797.

=== July ===
- Battle of Santa Cruz de Tenerife (1797), an amphibious assault by the Royal Navy on the Spanish port city of Santa Cruz de Tenerife in the Canary Islands launched by Rear-Admiral Horatio Nelson. The result was a Spanish victory by truce after Nelson's party had lost several hundred men.

== Births ==
- Juan José Guzmán was the first president of El Salvador.
- Ramón Castilla was a president of Peru

== Deaths ==
- Francesco Sabatini died in Madrid after completing important architecture projects in Spain.
