= Battle of Arlabán (1811) =

1811 battle during the Peninsular War

- Part of the Peninsular War
Date	25 May 1811
Location	Mountain pass between Álava and Guipúzcoa, Spain 42°58′38″N 2°34′17″W
Result	Spanish victory

Belligerents
(First French Empire) French Empire	Spain

Commanders and leaders
(First French Empire) Colonel Laffitte (POW)	Francisco Espoz y Mina

Strength
1,600	3,000–4,500

Casualties and losses
Unknown	Unknown

Peninsular War
Castile 1811–13
current battle

The Battle of Arlabán, also known as the First Surprise of Arlabán, took place at the heights of Arlabán, the mountain pass that separates the Basque provinces of Guipúzcoa and Álava, on 25 May 1811, during the Peninsular War.

== Battle ==
At eight o'clock in the morning, a Spanish guerrilla force numbering between 3,000 and 4,500 men, led by Francisco Espoz y Mina, ambushed and captured the central part of a convoy made up of 150 wagons and 1,050 prisoners, escorted by 1,600 French troops led by Colonel Laffitte and spread out over 5 km. Seven hours later, the French finally surrendered. The Spanish captured a variety of supplies and weapons (the convoy was valued at 4 million reales), and 1,042 British, Portuguese and Spanish prisoners were released. The convoy became known as the convoy de los Ingleses because most of the prisoners were British.

Aided by local guerrilla groups that knew the terrain well, Espoz y Mina had positioned his guerrilleros on both sides of the pass, on the route to France, some 20 km north of Vitoria, at four o'clock in the morning.

== Aftermath ==
This was the last action that Espoz y Mina led as a guerrilla leader in Navarre. On 5 June, his forces, the División de Navarra, were integrated into the regular Army of Spain, but he would continue to lead his troops into battle against the French, including at the Second Surprise of Arlabán, on 9 April 1812.
