= 1743 in Spain =

- Decades: 1720s; 1730s; 1740s; 1750s; 1760s
- See also: History of Spain; Timeline of Spanish history; List of years in Spain

Events from the year 1743 in Spain

== Incumbents ==
- Monarch – Philip V
- First Secretary of State - Sebastián de la Cuadra

== Events ==
- March 2 – Battle of La Guaira: Spanish victory over the British.

== Births ==
- June 3 – José Fernando de Abascal y Sousa, Spanish viceroy of Peru (d. 1821)
