= 1800 in Spain =

- Decades: 1780s; 1790s; 1800s; 1810s; 1820s
- See also: History of Spain; Timeline of Spanish history; List of years in Spain

Events from the year 1800 in Spain.

== Incumbents ==
- Monarch – Charles IV (1788-1808)

== Events ==
- Battle of Puerto Plata Harbor
- Ferrol Expedition (1800)
- Third Treaty of San Ildefonso

== Births ==
- 1800 – José Balaca, Spanish painter (d. 1869)

== Deaths ==
- 25 November – Francisco Bouligny, Spanish Army officer and colonial administrator (b. 1736)
