= 1749 in Spain =

- Decades: 1720s; 1730s; 1740s; 1750s; 1760s
- See also: History of Spain; Timeline of Spanish history; List of years in Spain

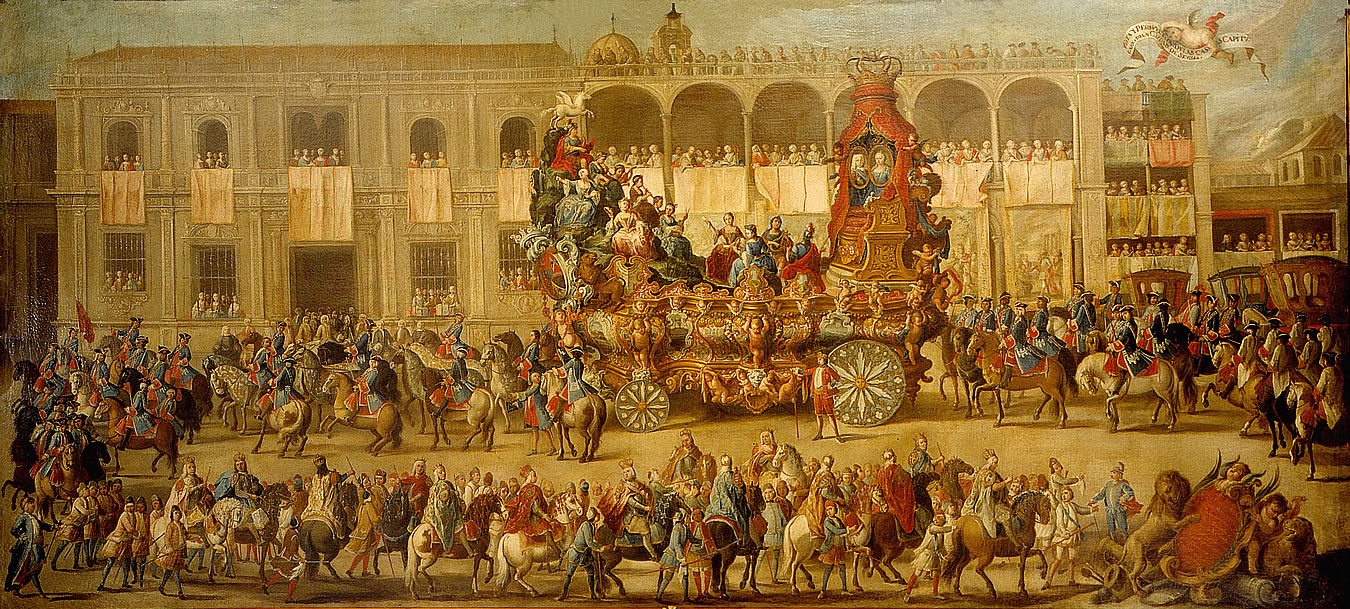
DomingoMartínez

Events in the year 1749 in Spain.

== Incumbents ==
- Monarch: Ferdinand VI
- Secretary of State: Zenón de Somodevilla, 1st Marqués de la Ensenada

== Events ==
- July 30 - Great Gypsy Round-up

== Births ==
- September 21 - Mariano Álvarez de Castro (d. 1810)
