= Guillermo Ducker =

18th-19th century Dutch artist

Guillermo Ducker (fl. 1795–1830) was a Dutch miniaturist known to have been active mainly in Madrid, Spain between 1795 and 1830. He is known to have painted for Spain's royal family as well as for Madrid's high society, until at least 1813, when he painted a miniature of Joaquina Téllez Girón, Marchioness of Santa Cruz.

Although his first known work is from 1795, the first actual mention of Ducker appears in a 1799 letter from Francisco de Goya to Spain's Secretary of State (prime minister), Mariano Luis de Urquijo in which he expressly recommends Ducker and requests Ducker's release from prison in order to paint some miniatures of Carlos IV and his family.

== Goya's letter of recommendation ==
On 2 December 1799, Goya wrote to the prime minister to thank him for having been granted permission to fish in the Casa de Campo, the King's private hunting estate.The letter continues as follows:

The diamond jeweler Soto came and left me a medallion in which the portraits of Their Majesties are to be inserted. I cannot think who could copy them in miniature, except for Ducker, who is currently in prison, because it happened with a portrait of mine of the duke of Aba [sic]; Alba that no one knew how to copy but for said Ducker, nor do I believe that for this task someone could be found in Italy or France: Your Excellency could permit him to leave prison, even if he returns at night, and you will have excellent portraits of the Monarchs.

Urquijo noted in the margin of the letter that although Ducker was to be released from prison to work for the Royal Family, "he will be expelled from this kingdom unless he uses the necessary moderation in his language and manners".

== Known work ==
Ducker is known to have painted for the royal family, at six ounces of gold per portrait. The Queen of Spain, María Luisa, commissioned copies of portraits of Goya and effigies of the King of Etruria, Louis I and the infantes Francisco y María Isabel.

After having left Madrid for Barcelona, Leandro Fernández de Moratín wrote to a cousin in Madrid in 1817 requesting a portrait, specifying that he would not accept "just any dauber" and that "the most outstanding miniaturist in Madrid when I left was a Dutchman named Ducker; if he is still around, and not blind or paralytic, he could paint really well...".

Ducker's last known work is from 1830.

=== Prado Museum ===
The Prado has eight miniatures painted by Ducker, including two of members of the Tellez-Girón family.

==== Works in the collection of the Prado ====
- Female portrait (1804)
- Female portrait (1805)
- Portrait of a Lady (1805)
- Pedro Téllez-Girón, 9th Duke of Osuna (1805)
- Male portrait (c. 1810)
- Male portrait (c. 1810)
- Mariano Luis de Urquijo (early 19th century)
- Joaquina Téllez Girón, Marchioness of Santa Cruz (1813)

=== Museum of Romanticism ===
==== Works in the collection of the Museum of Romanticism ====
The Museum of Romanticism in Madrid has three miniature portraits by Ducker, painted between 1800 and 1810.

- Portrait of a Lady (c. 1800–1809)
- An Official (1809)
- Portrait of an Official (c. 1800–1810)

=== Works in other collections ===
The Fundación Lázaro Galdiano in Madrid has a miniature Portrait of Josefa Tudó Cathalán Alemani, condesa de Castillofiel, attributed to Ducker, painted around 1805.

The descendants of José Pascual de Zayas y Chacón also have in their possession a miniature of the general painted in 1814.

== Gallery ==
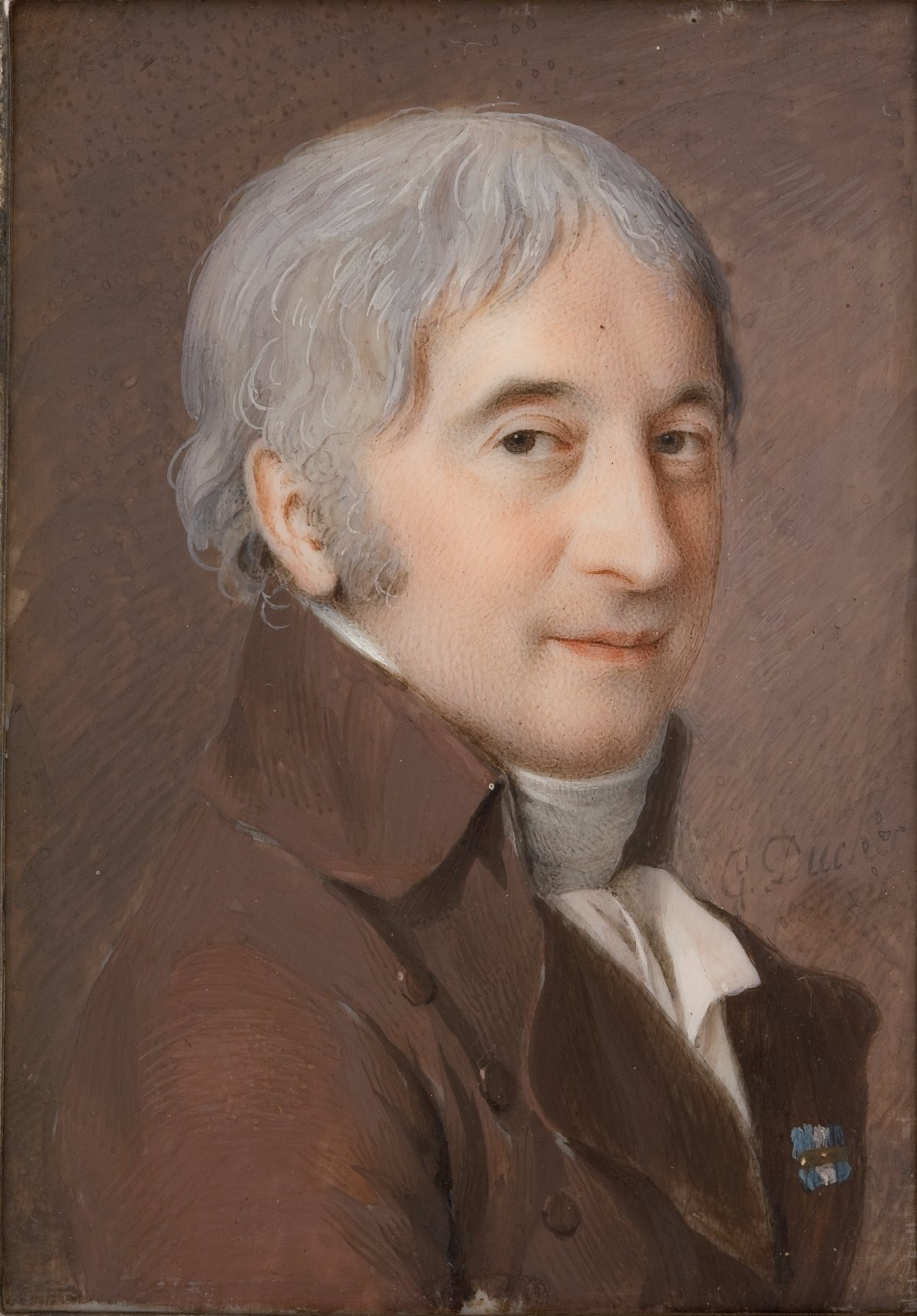
Pedro Téllez-Girón, 9th Duke of Osuna, gouache / tempera on ivory (1805)

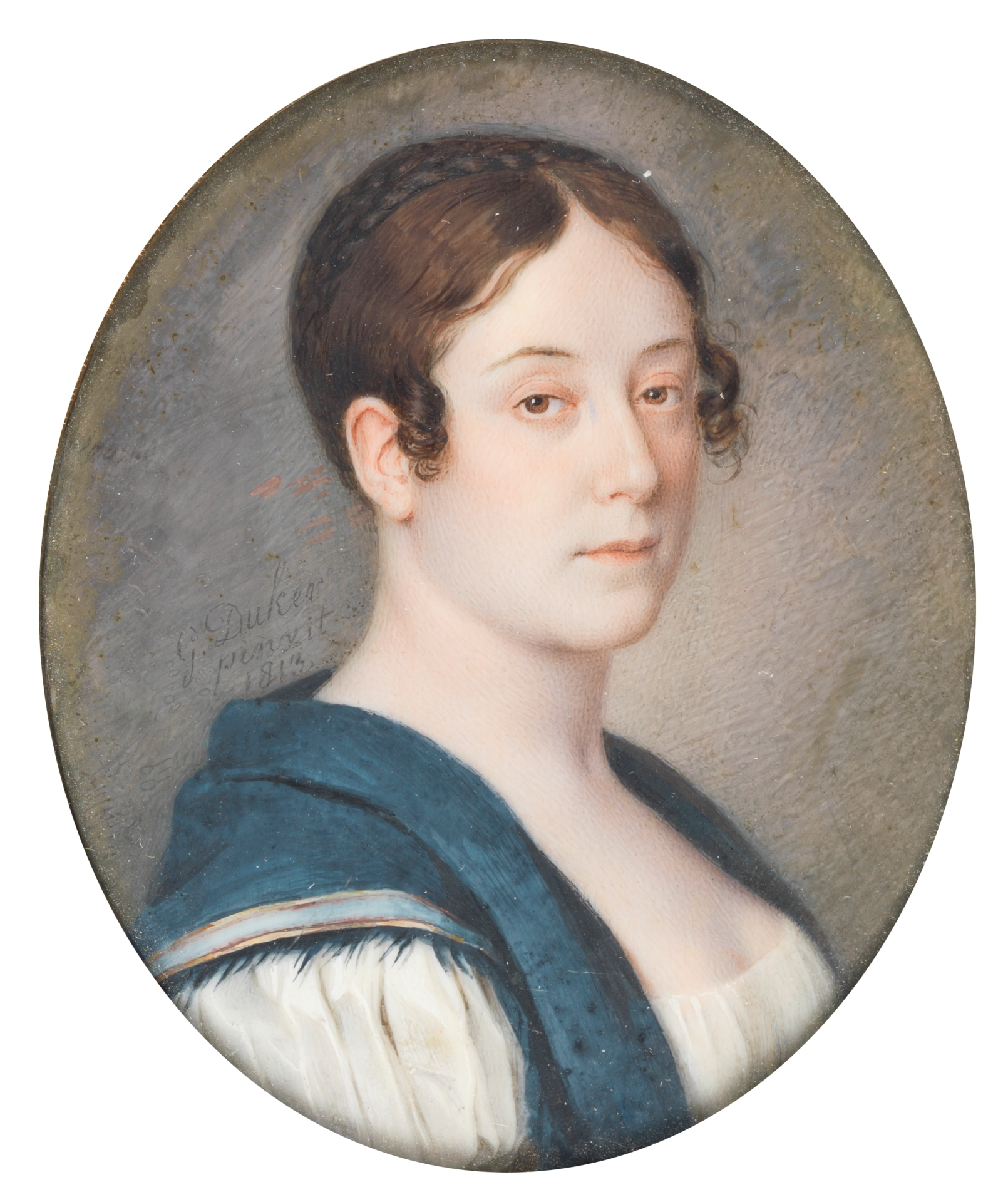
Joaquina Téllez Girón, Marchioness of Santa Cruz, gouache / tempera on ivory (1813)

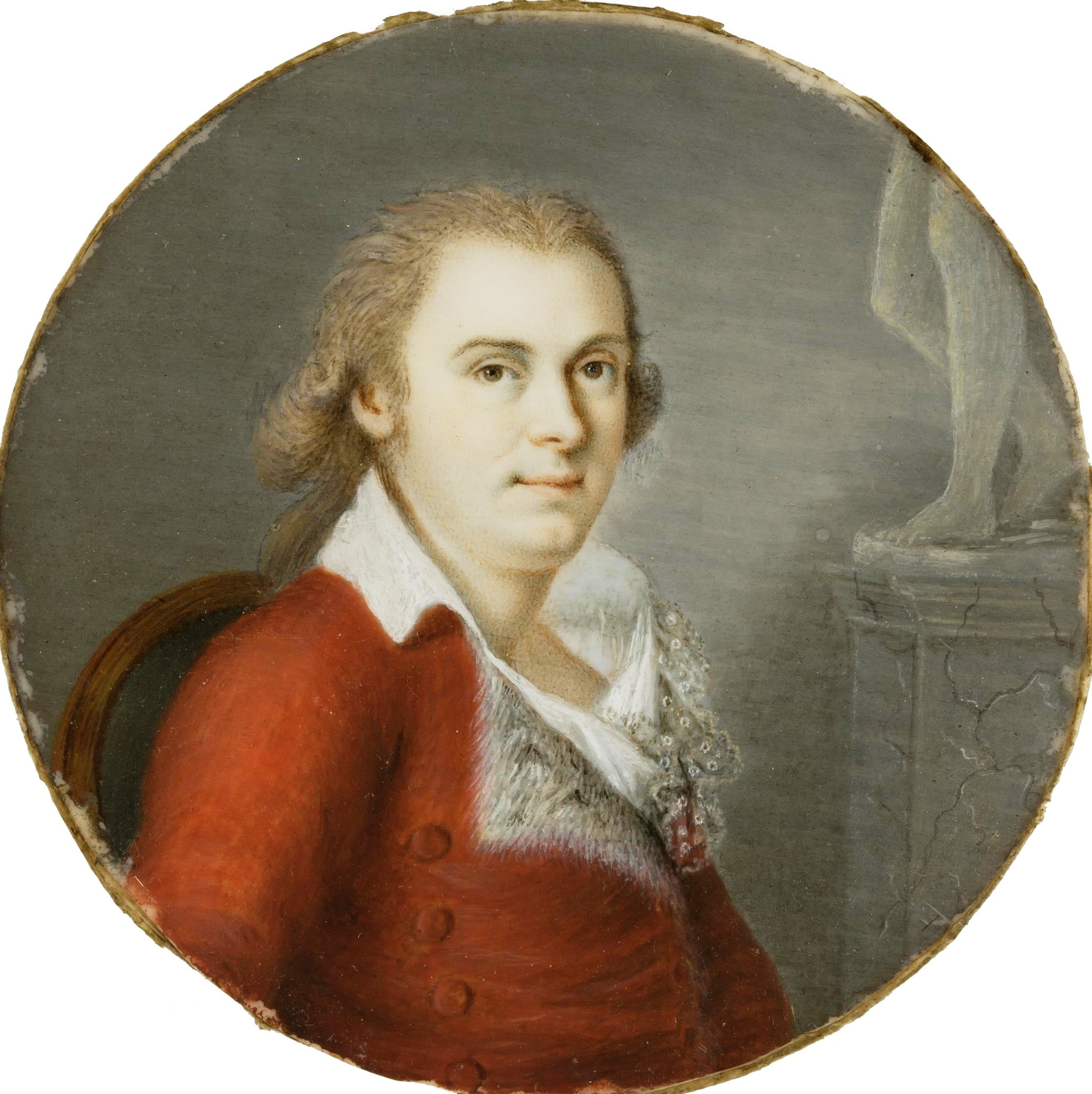
Mariano Luis de Urquijo, gouache / tempera on ivory (early 19th century)
