= 1848 in Spain =

- Decades: 1820s; 1830s; 1840s; 1850s; 1860s
- See also: History of Spain; Timeline of Spanish history; List of years in Spain

Events in the year 1848 in Spain.

== Incumbents ==
- Monarch: Isabella II
- Prime Minister: Ramon Maria Narvaez

== Events ==
- 28 October 1848: the railway line Barcelona–Mataró is opened. It is the first railway line in Spain.

== Births ==
- 12 May - Urbano González Serrano (d. 1904), krausipositivista intellectual

== Deaths ==
- 9 July – Jaime Balmes, philosopher, theologian and political writer (born 1810)
