= Christophe Antoine Merlin =

French military officer (1771–1839)

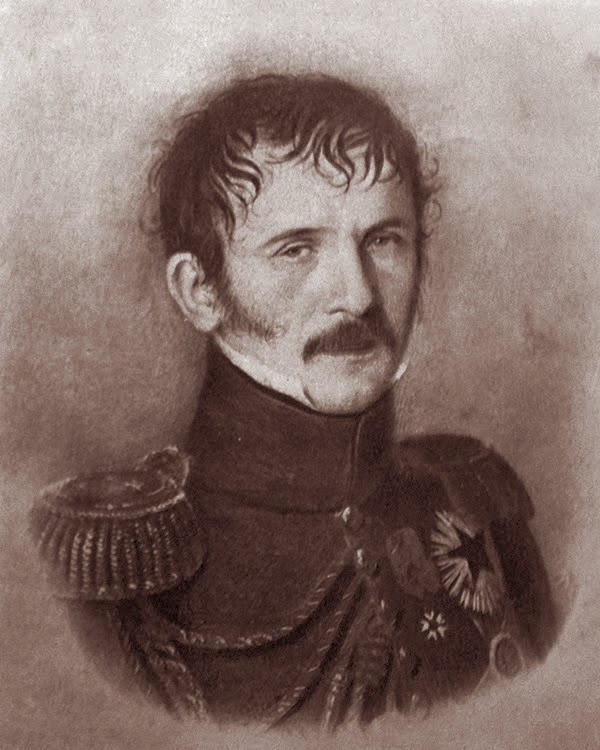
- General of Division Christophe Antoine Merlin
- Born: 27 May 1771; Thionville, France
- Died: 9 March 1839 (aged 67); Paris, France
- Military career
- Allegiance: France
- Branch: Cavalry
- Service years: (France) 1791–1825, 1830–1836
- Rank: General of Division
- Conflicts: War of the First Coalition; War of the Pyrenees; Rhine Campaign of 1795; Rhine Campaign of 1796; Battle of Neuwied; War of the Second Coalition; Battle of Ostrach; Battle of Stockach (1799); Second Battle of Zurich; Battle of Stockach (1800); Battle of Hohenlinden; War of the Fourth Coalition; Invasion of Naples; Peninsular War; Battle of Talavera; Battle of Almonacid; Battle of Ocaña; War of the Sixth Coalition; Battle of Vauchamps; Battle of Gué-à-Tresmes; Battle of Laon; Battle of Reims; Battle of Fère-Champenoise; Battle of Paris
- Awards: Légion d'Honneur, GC 1834; Order of Saint Louis, 1814

Christophe Antoine Merlin (French pronunciation: [kʁistɔf ɑ̃twan mɛʁlɛ̃]; 27 May 1771 – 9 March 1839) became a French division commander during the Napoleonic Wars. He joined a volunteer regiment in 1791 and fought against the Kingdom of Spain in the War of the Pyrenees. After becoming an officer in the 4th Hussar Regiment, he participated in the Rhine and Italian campaigns. In 1805, he was promoted general of brigade and fought in Italy and in the 1806 Invasion of Naples. Later, he became an equerry to Joseph Bonaparte when that individual headed the Kingdom of Naples.

When Joseph accepted the crown of Spain in 1808, Merlin went with him and was assigned to Joseph's Spanish army as a general of division. He fought at Talavera, Almonacid and Ocaña in 1809. After re-entering the French service in 1814, he led a cavalry division at Gué-à-Tresmes, Laon, Reims, Fère-Champenoise and Paris. In 1815, he led soldiers on the Rhine. He held peacetime commands until 1825, when he retired, but was again employed from 1830 to 1836. His surname is one of the names inscribed under the Arc de Triomphe on Column 30.

== Early career ==
Merlin was born on 27 May 1771 at Thionville, France. He joined the 4th Battalion of the Moselle Volunteers as a sergeant-major on 15 August 1791. He transferred to the 105th Line Infantry Regiment as a sous-officer on 7 December 1791 and became lieutenant on 11 May 1792. He transferred again to the Army of the Midi as an adjutant on 21 September 1792 and was involved in some campaigning before emerging as captain in the Legion of the Moselle on 8 December 1792. Merlin transferred to the Army of the North as an aide-de-camp to General of Division Jean-Baptiste Favart on 8 March 1793. He became a chef d'escadron (major) on 3 August and joined the Army of the North staff as an adjutant general on 5 October 1793.

On 9 February 1794, Merlin took a staff position with the Army of the Eastern Pyrenees and fought in the War of the Pyrenees against the Kingdom of Spain. During the conflict, he was wounded in the left leg by a bursting howitzer shell. He was assigned to the 4th Hussar Regiment as adjutant general chef de brigade on 13 June 1795. He served with the regiment in the Army of Sambre-et-Meuse. During the Rhine Campaign of 1795 on 1 October, the 4th Hussars were part of Paul Grenier's division. Merlin was wounded in the right arm by a sabre stroke at Steinbach on 15 October 1795 in a minor French victory during the retreat.

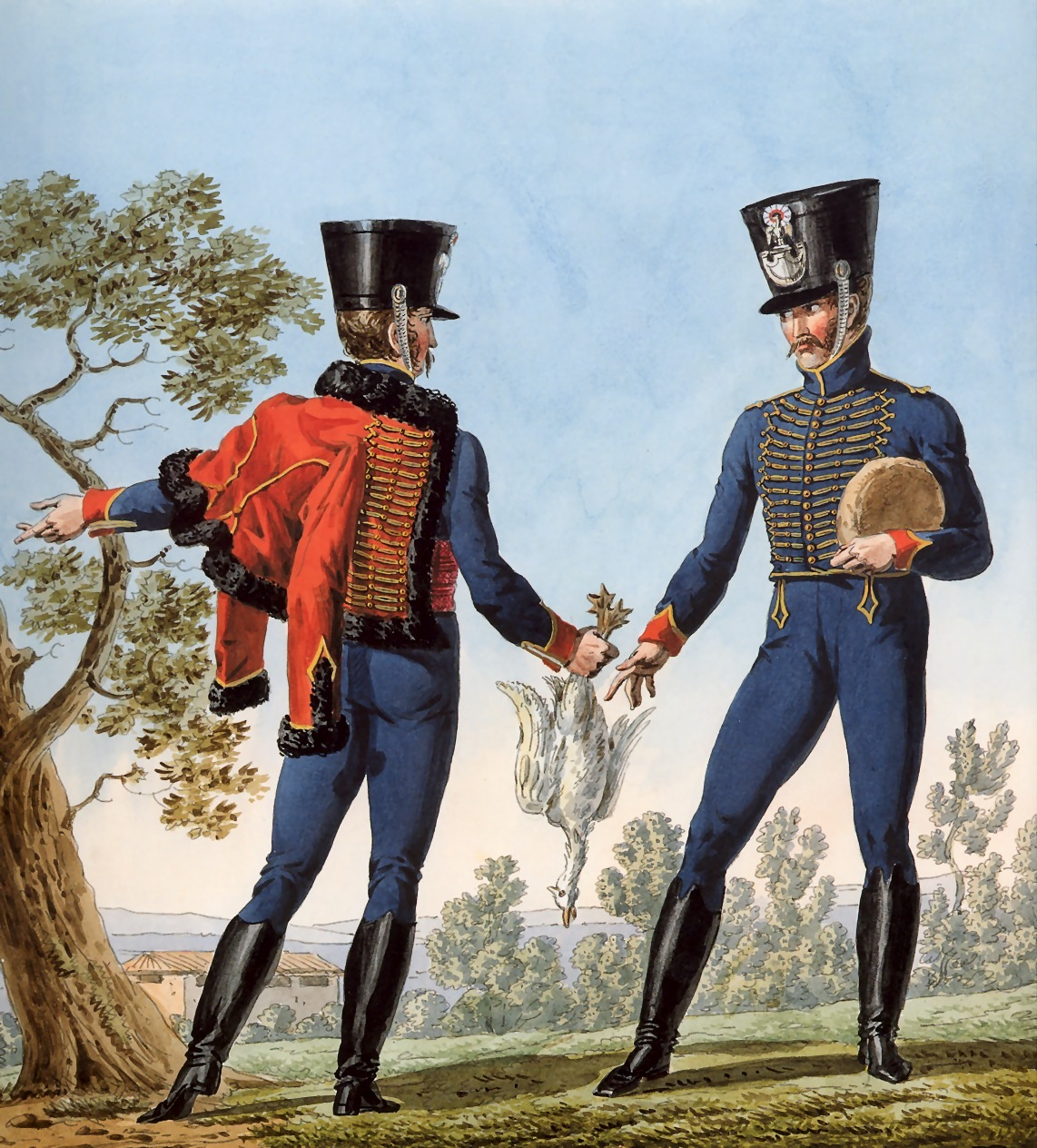
Uniform of 4th Hussars

During the Rhine Campaign of 1796, the 4th Hussars were in François Joseph Lefebvre's division of Jean-Baptiste Jourdan's Army of the Sambre-et-Meuse. On 31 May, the campaign started when the divisions of Lefebvre and Claude-Sylvestre Colaud advanced from Düsseldorf. The cavalry screen included Merlin, who the source incorrectly identified as a sous-lieutenant. In fact, Merlin was appointed commander of the 4th Hussars on 25 June. The army's last action of the campaign was the Battle of Limburg on 16 September 1796. In 1797, the army's hussars were formed into a division under Michel Ney. The Hussar Division distinguished itself at the Battle of Neuwied on 18 April 1797.

In the War of the Second Coalition, the 4th Hussars fought with Lefebvre's division of Jourdan's Army of the Rhine in the Battle of Ostrach on 21 March 1799 and the First Battle of Stockach four days later. The regiment participated in the Second Battle of Zurich on 25–26 September 1799 in Édouard Mortier's 8th Division of André Masséna's Army of the Danube. At the start of the 1800 campaign the 4th Hussars were assigned to Antoine Guillaume Delmas' division of Jean Victor Marie Moreau's Army of the Rhine. Delmas' division fought at the Second Battle of Stockach on 3 May 1800.

At the Battle of Hohenlinden on 3 December 1800, the regiment was part of Emmanuel de Grouchy's division. Together with the 108th Line Infantry Regiment, the 4th Hussars opposed the Austrian advance guard as it tried to emerge from the forest. After initial Austrian success, Grouchy's troops pushed their enemies back to the edge of the forest. The 4th Hussars tried twice to overrun an Austrian battery and were successful on their third charge. Merlin sent a hussar squadron against some nearby infantry and sent them fleeing. From 1801 to 1803 he served in the garrison at Cambrai. He participated in the successful French 1803 invasion of the Electorate of Hanover, which ended in the Convention of Artlenburg. Merlin became a member of the Légion d'Honneur on 11 December 1803 and an officer of the Légion on 14 June 1804.

== General officer ==
Merlin was promoted general of brigade on 1 February 1805. In Masséna's Army of Italy, he led a cavalry brigade consisting of the 14th and 25th Chasseurs à Cheval. Merlin's 6th Brigade was part of Jean-Louis-Brigitte Espagne's Cavalry Division at the 1806 Siege of Gaeta. He became an equerry to Joseph Bonaparte, the new sovereign of the Kingdom of Naples. On 1 June 1807, he took command of the division of Salerno and Avellino and transferred to lead the division of Abruzzo on 9 September. Merlin was part of the kingdom's government in Naples in May 1808 when Joseph assumed the crown of Spain. Merlin went with Joseph and became a general of division and captain general in Joseph's Kingdom of Spain.

At the Battle of Talavera on 27–28 July 1809, Merlin led 1,188 men of the IV Corps cavalry brigade. The units were the 10th and 26th Chasseurs à Cheval, Polish Lancer and Westphalian Chevau-léger Regiments. During the battle, the British commander Sir Arthur Wellesley ordered William Anson's cavalry brigade to charge the French. About 150 yards (137 m) in front of the French defenders, the 1st Hussars of the King's German Legion and the 23rd Light Dragoons unwittingly charged into a hidden stream bed, which toppled many horses and tumbled many riders to the ground. Hastily reforming, the Germans and the left wing of the 23rd LD charged the French infantry drawn up in squares, were repulsed and withdrew. Drake's and Allen's squadrons on the right wing of the 23rd LD rode past the squares and charged Merlin's cavalry brigade. The 10th and 26th Chasseurs in the front line drew aside and allowed the British cavalry to gallop past. The two British squadrons struck the Westphalians in the second line, then were attacked from behind by the 10th and 26th Chasseurs. Only Lord George Russell and a few other British horsemen escaped the trap. In the battle, the 23rd Light Dragoons lost 207 killed, wounded and captured out of 450 horsemen.

Merlin led cavalry at the Battle of Almonacid on 11 August 1809. The IV Corps cavalry on that occasion included the 3rd Dutch Hussars and the Polish Lancers of the Legion of the Vistula. King Joseph appointed Merlin to command his Royal Guard on 16 August, but he also led the light cavalry in the rout of the Spanish at the Battle of Ocaña on 18–19 November 1809, according to historian Charles Mullié. This is contradicted by Charles Oman, who asserted that Antoine-Marie Paris d'Illins led the IV Corps cavalry at Ocaña. Paris was killed in a cavalry melee on 18 November and was succeeded by André Thomas Perreymond.

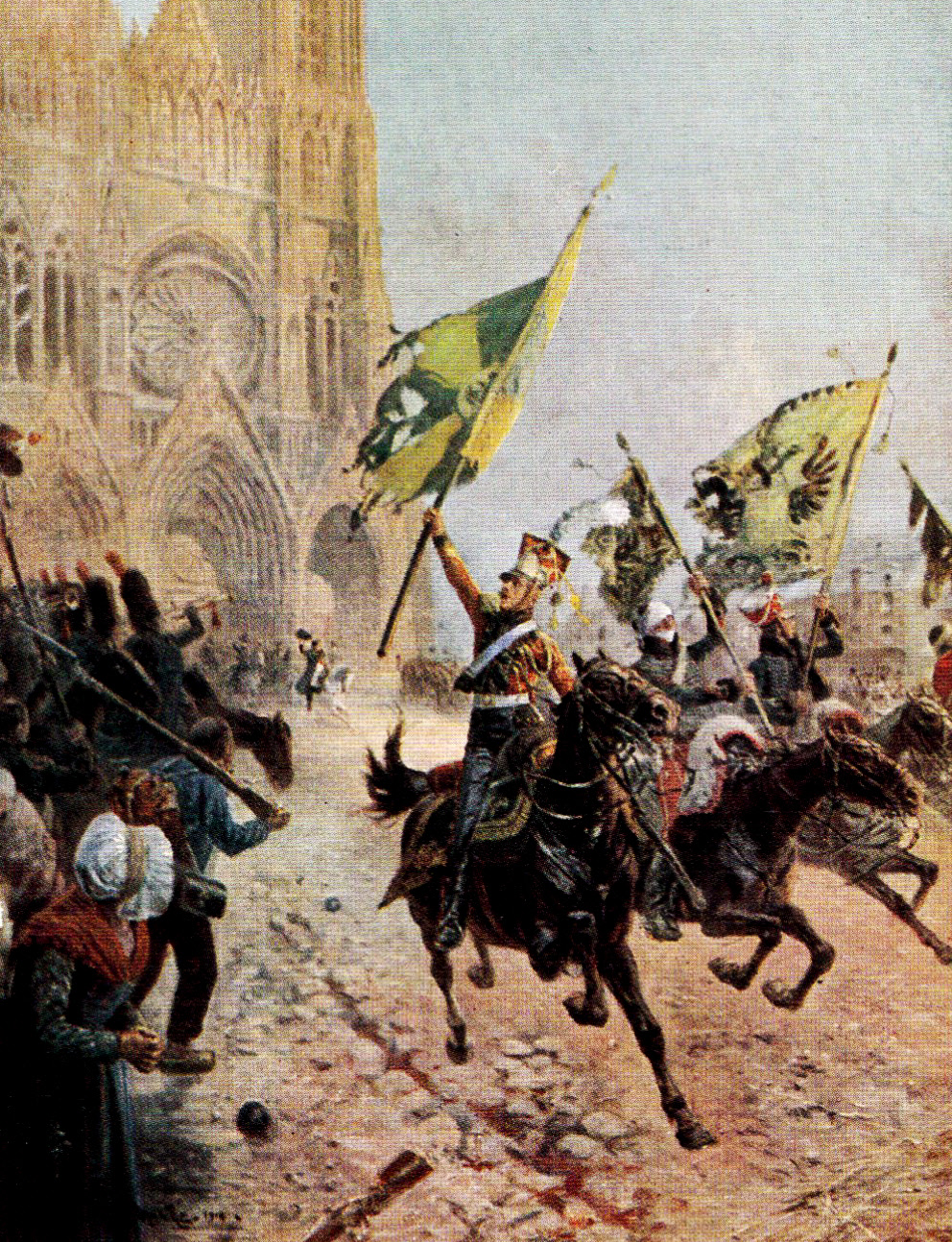
Battle of Reims, 13 March 1814

After the French were driven out of Spain, Merlin received a promotion to general of division in the French army on 5 January 1814. After being placed in charge of the central cavalry depot on 21 January and in command of some National Guard units on 31 January, he assumed command of a cavalry division on 11 February. At about this time, Emperor Napoleon reorganized his cavalry, forming the I Cavalry Corps from the divisions of Merlin and Étienne Tardif de Pommeroux de Bordesoulle with Bordesoulle in command of the corps. Merlin's 1st Light Cavalry Division first appeared in the order of battle during the Battle of Champaubert on 9 February. At the Battle of Vauchamps on 14 February, the 1st Brigade under François Isidore Wathiez consisted of the 6th, 7th and 8th Hussars and the 1st, 3rd, 5th, 7th and 8th Chevau-léger Lancers. The 2nd Brigade under Claude Raymond Guyon was made up of the 1st, 2nd, 3rd, 6th, 8th, 9th, 16th and 25th Chasseurs à Cheval. On 20 February, Wathiez's brigade counted 1,063 sabres while Guyon's brigade had 956. The regiments were small; the largest numbered 177 and the smallest 84 horsemen.

Merlin's division was involved in the fighting subsequent to the Battle of Gué-à-Tresmes. On 2 March 1814, Friedrich von Kleist sent out a reconnaissance force of three cavalry regiments, five infantry battalions and two horse artillery batteries. Merlin charged the Prussians but was pushed back on his infantry supports. The Prussians were stopped and retreated in the late afternoon. During the Battle of Laon on 9 March, the corps of Marshal Auguste de Marmont and Bordesoulle were routed by a 7:30 pm Prussian surprise attack. The French lost 3,500 men and 45 guns in the so-called "Hurrah of Athies". At the Battle of Reims on 13 March, Merlin's division advanced on the extreme right flank with the task of stopping the Prussians from falling back toward the bridge at Sillery. The cavalrymen overran a number of Prussian battalions, compelling the soldiers to surrender. On 14 March, Merlin's troopers were beaten in a skirmish with Friedrich von Katzeler's Prussian cavalry at Courcy, losing about 100 casualties. By 17 March, Merlin's division had shrunk to 1,150 sabres when it was assigned to Marmont's corps.

When the force led by Marshals Marmont and Mortier moved east, Merlin formed its advance guard. On 23 March 1814 at Bergères, his troopers drove off an Allied foraging party, capturing 100 men and liberating 16 wagon loads of plunder. At the Battle of Fère-Champenoise on 25 March, Marmont and Mortier with 18,100 infantry, 4,350 cavalry and 84 guns found themselves facing 26,400 Allied cavalry and 128 guns. Merlin's division was involved in the fighting, which ended in a serious French defeat. For the Battle of Paris on 30 March, Merlin's division was reduced to 850 horsemen in the brigades of Pierre François Huber and Antoine Henri Latour-Foissac. Marmont and Mortier led 19,961 foot soldiers and 5,565 horsemen against 119,000 Allied infantry and 26,500 cavalry. Bordesoulle's corps and Louis Pierre Aimé Chastel's cavalry division were posted on the extreme right flank. After stiff fighting, Marmont and Mortier agreed to an armistice that would allow them to evacuate Paris.

== Later career ==
After Napoleon abdicated, King Louis XVIII named Merlin inspector general of cavalry in the 5th Military Division and awarded him the Order of Saint-Louis on 19 July 1814. During the Hundred Days, Napoleon appointed Merlin to lead the 8th Cavalry Division in the V Corps. He led his troopers in successful skirmishes against the Allies on 24 and 28 June 1815. Upon the Second Bourbon Restoration, Merlin was placed in inactive status. On 25 July 1816, he was made cavalry inspector for the 6th and 18th Military Divisions, and on 27 April 1817, this changed to cavalry inspector of the 18th and 21st Military Divisions. He was appointed to the General Staff on 30 December 1818. He became cavalry inspector for the 2nd Military Division on 21 April 1820. He became available for other assignments on 1 January 1821. He was placed on retirement on 1 January 1825.

After the July Revolution, Merlin was first appointed cavalry inspector of the 38th arrondissement on 8 August 1830 and commander of Corsica on 9 September 1830. He became an infantry inspector on 18 March 1831 before being available for other assignments on 30 December that year. He was made cavalry inspector for the 3rd Military Division on 5 July 1832 and became a member of the Infantry and Cavalry Committee on 20 September that year. King Louis Philippe I named Merlin a Grand Officer of the Légion d'honneur on 18 April 1834. He was appointed cavalry inspector of the 1st Military Division on 14 June 1834. He was placed in inactive status on 27 May 1836 and died in Paris on 9 May 1839. MERLIN is inscribed on the south side of the Arc de Triomphe.

== Family ==
During his stay in Spain (1808-1813), he married on 31 October 1809 Maria de las Mercedes Santa Cruz y Montalvo, a young aristocratic woman born in Havana, who would go on to become a famous author. They had four children: Josefa Teresa Ana, born in 1812; Francisco Dieudonné, born in 1814; Gonzalo Cristóbal, born in 1816; and Annette Elizabeth Joséphine, born in 1818..

== Sources ==
- Arnold, James R. (2005). Marengo & Hohenlinden: Napoleon's Rise to Power. Barnsley, South Yorkshire: Pen and Sword. ISBN 1-84415-279-0.
- Broughton, Tony (2006). "French Hussar Regiments and the Colonels Who Led Them 1791-1815: 4th Regiment". The Napoleon Series.
- Broughton, Tony (2007). "Generals Who Served in the French Army during the Period 1789-1815: Mellet to Mireur". The Napoleon Series.
- Mullié, Charles (1852). "Merlin (Christophe-Antoine)" . Biographie des célébrités militaires des armées de terre et de mer de 1789 à 1850 (in French). Paris: Poignavant et Compagnie.
- Nafziger, George (2015). The End of Empire: Napoleon's 1814 Campaign. Solihull, UK: Helion & Company. ISBN 978-1-909982-96-3.
- Oman, Charles (1995) [1903]. A History of the Peninsular War Volume II. Vol. 2. Mechanicsburg, Pennsylvania: Stackpole. ISBN 1-85367-215-7.
- Oman, Charles (1996) [1908]. A History of the Peninsular War Volume III. Vol. 3. Mechanicsburg, Pennsylvania: Stackpole. ISBN 1-85367-223-8.
- Petre, F. Loraine (1994) [1914]. Napoleon at Bay. Mechanicsburg, Pa.: Stackpole Books. ISBN 1-85367-163-0.
- Phipps, Ramsay Weston (2011) [1929]. The Armies of the First French Republic and the Rise of the Marshals of Napoleon I: The Armées du Moselle, du Rhin, de Sambre-et-Meuse, de Rhin-et-Moselle. Vol. 2. Pickle Partners Publishing. ISBN 978-1-908692-25-2.
- Smith, Digby (1998). The Napoleonic Wars Data Book. London: Greenhill. ISBN 1-85367-276-9.
