= Battle of Valdepeñas =

1808 rebellion during the Peninsular War

- Part of the Peninsular War
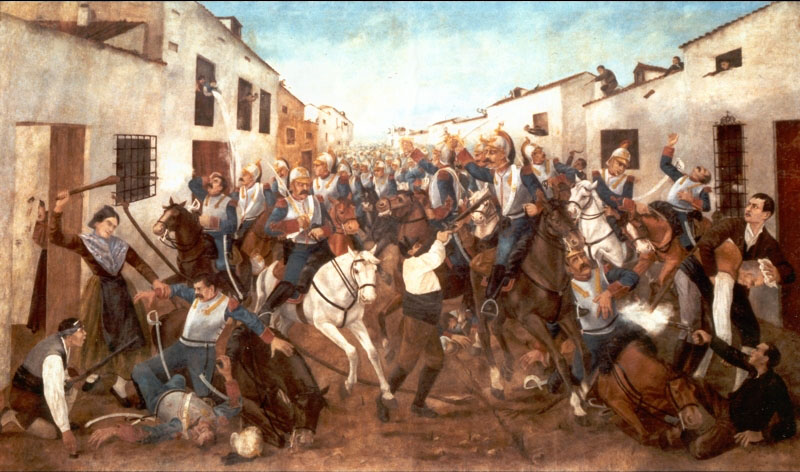
- Valdepeñas Uprising against French Troops
Date	6 June 1808
Location	Valdepeñas, Ciudad Real, Castile-La Mancha 38°46′N 3°24′W
Result	Spanish victory: French communication lines disrupted

Belligerents
(France) French Empire	Kingdom of Spain

Commanders and leaders
Louis Liger-Belair; Roize	Juan Antonio León-Vezares; Francisco María Osorio Becerra; Juan Rojo Baylón

Strength
1,100	Unknown

Casualties and losses
Unknown	Unknown

Peninsular War: Spanish uprising 1808
current battle

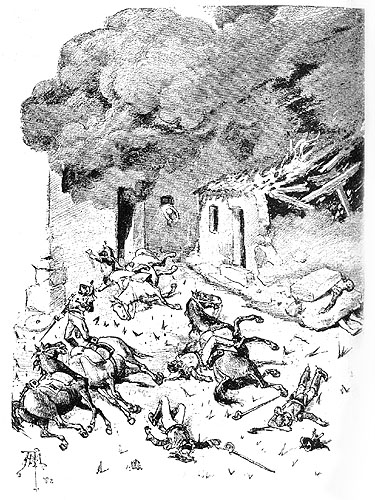
Valdepeñas Uprising

The battle of Valdepeñas (Spanish: Contienda de Valdepeñas) was a popular uprising that took place on 6 June 1808, at the beginning of the Spanish War of Independence, in the town of Valdepeñas, Ciudad Real, Castile-La Mancha. Valdepeñas is on the main road from Madrid to Andalusia.

== Background ==
The Dos de Mayo Uprising had put Iberia in revolt against French rule. Word spread quickly of an armed conflict between partisans of the monarchy and French troops thanks to the comerciants selling wine. Three days later the city priest, Juan Antonio León-Vezares "El cura calao", called for a session in which he insisted that the city mayor, Francisco María Osorio Becerra, form an independent government body, called "Junta". This new government was led by the priest himself, the city mayor, and the vice president of the city mayoralty, Juan Rojo Baylón. They took control of the city government and decided to not cooperate with the French and to block the passage of French troops. The "City Junta", took charge of the defence of the city. With local command positions distributed between the three main members including the following members of the city: Manuel Madero Candelas; Miguel de Gregorio "El mercader" with the immediate subordinates Francisco Domingo Valiente Rodríguez; Juan Flores; Alfonso Molero Salmerón; José Casero; and José Pareja.

By early June the city had armed itself with muskets and homemade weapons. By 6 June, following the previous day's uprising at Santa Cruz de Mudela, the French generals Ligier-Belair and Roize, at the head of 800 troops, including 250 dragoons, and 300 soldiers who had escaped from the Santa Cruz uprising, prepared to march through the town of Valdepeñas.

Realizing the intentions of the French, the city decided to try and negotiate with the French delegation, armed with firearms created by "El cura calao", "El mercader" and Madero Candelas. At the meeting with general Ligier-Belair, the representatives of Valdepeñas told him that they would not allow the passage of the French troops. According to sources, the French commander replied that there was "little you can do to avoid it." In response, Calao responded that "At scarce armament, we will replace it with our will and bodies." Nevertheless, the French general decided to force his march through the town later that day.

== Uprising ==
The population, including women such as Juana Galán, who became a national heroine, attacked the leading column and Ligier-Belair sent in the dragoons, who were forced to retreat.

Finally, the French troops set fire to the houses and fired upon the fleeing population. The fires raged for three days and the resulting truce stipulated that the French troops would not pass through the village in return for a day's worth of food supplies.

== Aftermath ==
The Dos de Mayo Uprising had put Iberia in revolt against French rule leading to the Battle of Cabezón.

The guerrilla actions at Santa Cruz and Valdepeñas, together with more isolated actions in the Sierra Morena itself, effectively cut French military communications between Madrid and Andalusia for around a month.

== See also ==
- Timeline of the Peninsular War
