= Battle of Arlabán (1812) =

1812 battle during the Peninsular War

- Part of the Peninsular War
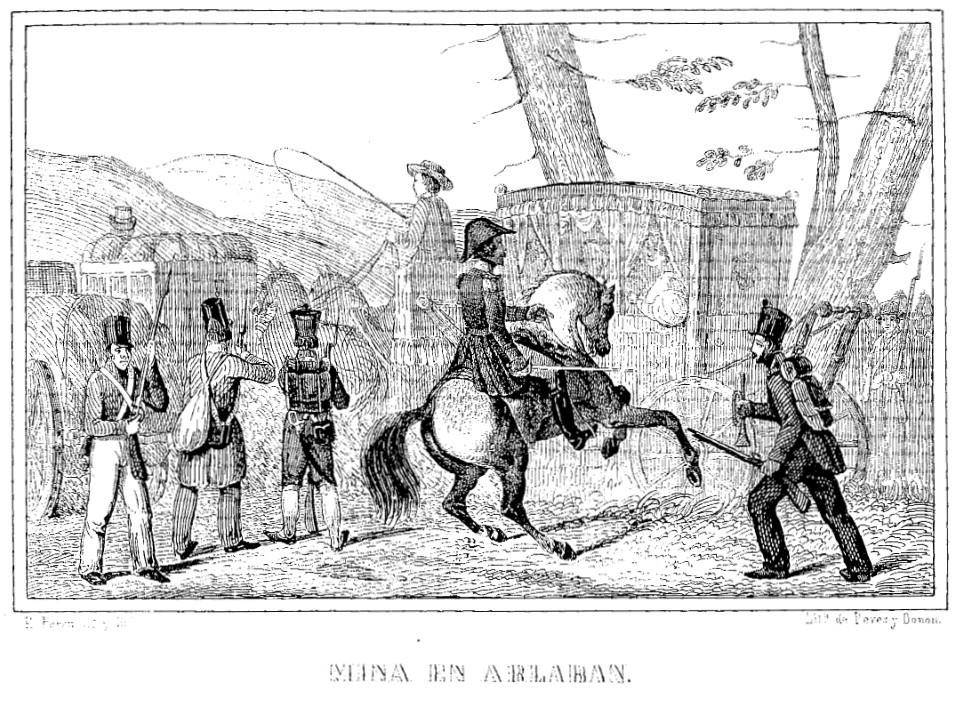
- Mina at Arlaban (1847 lithography by F. Peréz)
Date	9 April 1812
Location	Arlabán, Spain 42°50.67′N 2°45.62′W
Result	Spanish victory

Belligerents
(First French Empire) French Empire	Spain

Commanders and leaders
(First French Empire) Marie-François de Caffarelli	Francisco Espoz y Mina

Strength
2,000–3,000; 150 cavalry	3,000–3,500

Casualties and losses
600–700 killed or wounded 300 captured 800 prisoners released	30 killed, wounded or captured

Peninsular War
Castile 1811–13
current battle

The Battle of Arlabán of 1812, also known as the Second Surprise of Arlabán, took place in the mountain pass of Arlabán, Guipúzcoa, Basque Country, near the border with France, on 9 April 1812, during the Peninsular War. A Spanish force of 3,000–3,500 men led by Francisco Espoz y Mina intercepted a great French convoy (2,000–3,000 regulars and 150 cavalry) of General of Division Caffarelli.

The attack was a success, and after one hour, the French were completely defeated. The Spanish casualties were estimated at 30 killed and wounded, and the French lost between 600 and 700 men, and 300 captured. The Spanish also rescued 800 Spanish, British and Portuguese prisoners (five officers), and captured the valuable convoy (weapons and baggage, two colours, letters from Joseph Bonaparte to Napoleon, and a great amount of jewelry, valued between 700,000 and 800,000 francs). Joseph Bonaparte's personal secretary, Jean Deslandes, was killed in this action.

== See also ==
- Battle of Arlabán (1811)
