= Maria de las Mercedes Santa Cruz y Montalvo =

Cuban writer

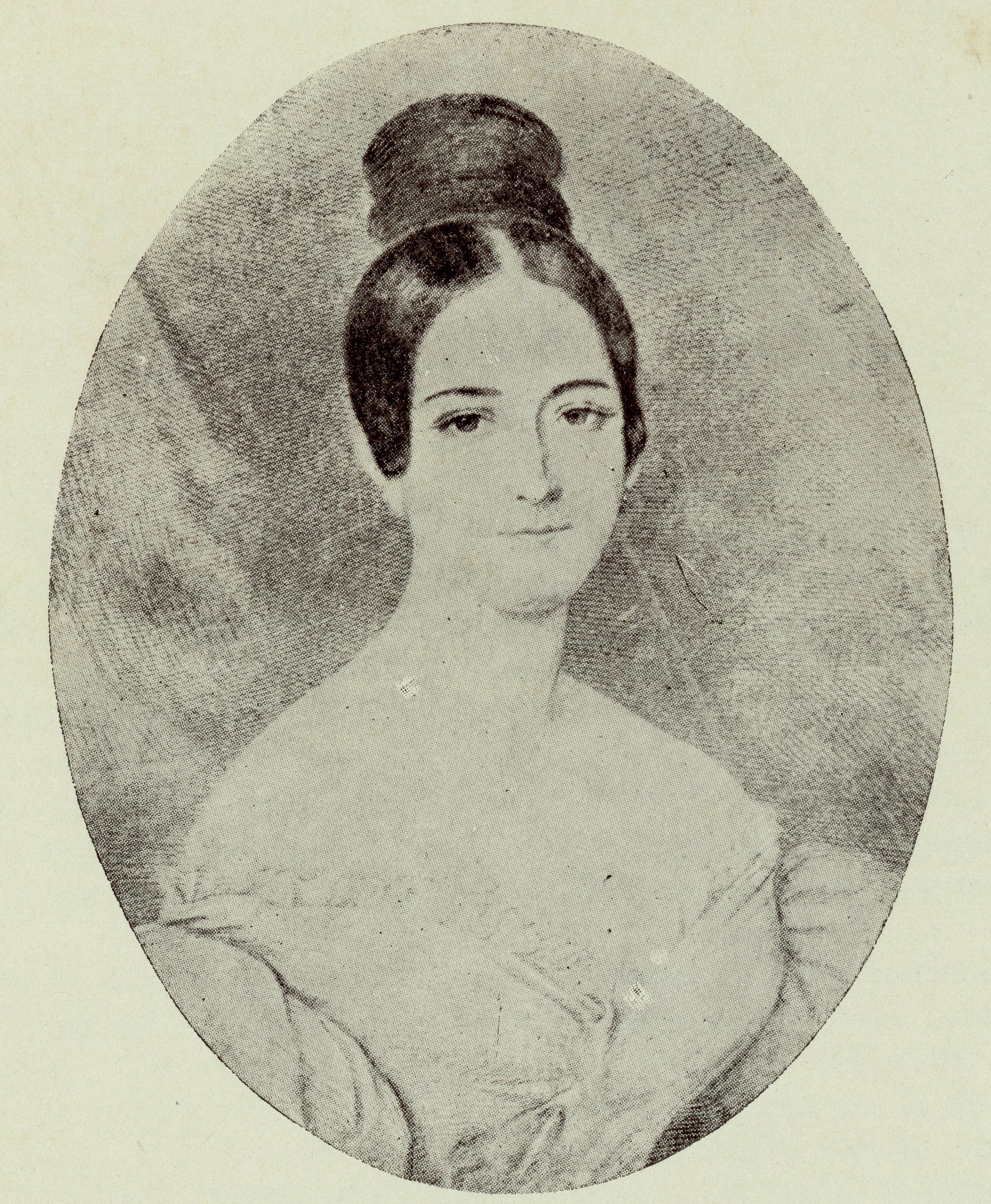
- Born: 5 February 1789; Havana
- Died: 31 March 1852; Paris
- Occupations: Writer, singer
- Spouse: Christophe Antoine Merlin

Maria de las Mercedes Santa Cruz y Montalvo, also known as Comtesse de Merlin (1789 in Havana – 1852 in Paris), was a Cuban-born writer.

== Biography ==
When fourteen years old she sailed with her parents for Spain, and finished her education in Madrid. In 1810, Santa Cruz y Montalvo married the French general, Christophe Antoine Merlin, and, in 1813 when the French troops left Spain, she went to Paris. There she soon became well known in French society and her home was the resort of persons eminent in science, literature, and art.
In 1840 Santa Cruz y Montalvo made a visit to her native city Havana, but in 1842 she returned again to her adopted country, where she had already obtained a reputation by her literary labors.

Her most important works are "Mis doce primeros anos" (Paris, 1833); "Memoires d'une Creole" (1835); "Ocios de una mujer de gran mundo" (1837); "L'esclavage aux colonies Espagnoles" (1840); "La Havane" (3 vols., 1842); "Les lionnes de Paris" (1845); and "Le due d'Athenes" (1848). Many of her works have been translated into several European languages; some of them were written originally in Spanish, though the majority were in French.

== Sources ==
- Rodenas, A.M. (2008). Viaje a la Habana (in Spanish). Stockcero. ISBN 978-1-934768-17-4.
