= Uprising of Santa Cruz de Mudela =

Action of the Peninsular War

The Uprising of Santa Cruz de Mudela was a popular uprising that took place on 5 June 1808, at the beginning of the Spanish War of Independence, in the town of Santa Cruz de Mudela, Ciudad Real, Castile-La Mancha. Santa Cruz de Mudela is on the main road from Madrid to Andalusia.

A detachment of 400 French troops stationed in the village of Santa Cruz de Mudela were attacked by the population. In the uprising, 109 French soldiers were killed and 113 others taken prisoner, while the rest fled back in the direction of Madrid, to Valdepeñas, where, the next day, there would be another famous popular uprising against the French Army.

The guerrilla actions at Santa Cruz and Valdepeñas, together with more isolated actions in the Sierra Morena itself, effectively cut French military communications between Madrid and Andalusia for around a month.

== See also ==
- Timeline of the Peninsular War
