= Irish immigration to Montserrat =

Irish immigration to Montserrat dates back to the early 17th century before and during the period of plantation owners and slavery. Montserrat is a Caribbean island and overseas territory of the United Kingdom. It is also known as "The Emerald Isle of The Caribbean" due to the large population of people with Irish descent living there. Irish people first arrived to the island in 1632 and people of mixed race with Irish descent still live on the island.

== Background ==
Montserrat was first settled on by Irish Catholics in 1632, who were sent there by Sir Thomas Warner, the first British governor of neighbouring St Kitts. After the settlement, more Irish settlers were attracted from colonial Virginia and they established plantations to grow tobacco and indigo, which would eventually be followed by cotton and sugar.

By the mid-seventeenth century, Irish Catholics accounted for the majority of the roughly 1,000 families resident on the island. Following Cromwell's victory in Ireland in 1653, it is estimated that as many as 10,000 Catholics were transported to the West Indies, some settling on Montserrat. Irish people accounted for over 70% of Montserrat's white population by the late seventeenth century, thus "registering the highest concentration of persons of Irish ethnicity of any colony in the history of both the first and second English empires".

The early settlers were repeatedly attacked by French forces and Carib Indians. The French took possession of the island in 1664 and again in 1667, but it was restored to England by the Treaty of Breda. French forces sacked the island in 1712 and captured it for the last time in 1782, but the Treaty of Paris (1783) again returned it to Britain.

These Irish people not only made up most of the population but they grew wealthy and played a huge role in the island's economy, becoming far more successful than their English and Scottish counterparts because, as one contemporary explained, ''They knew how to be tough and efficient slave masters.''

== Indentured servitude ==
Irish settlement in Montserrat was strongly associated with the growth in slavery and the trade that accompanied it. Indentured servants accounted for the majority of people migrating to Montserrat. Almost fifty to sixty percent of the labour flow from Britain to its many colonies during the early seventeenth century were servants. Many Irish migrants were attracted to the large supply of employment available in the sugar industry. This production of sugar was fueled by planters with Irish descent with over a third of the island's sugar estates being run by Irish families Some wealthy Anglo-Irish merchant families set up plantations and networks in the Caribbean which provided employment for the thousands of native Irish Catholic immigrants willing to travel to Montserrat. Almost half of the whole population of the West Indies by the mid-seventeenth century were Irish. By 1730 Montserrat's economy was almost entirely dependent on this industry which resulted in a change in the population demographics as more slaves from Africa were required as labourers to keep the booming industry going. The decline of the sugar industry resulted in a decline of the number of labourers needed, from 1735 onwards saw a decrease in sugar production which had detrimental effects on those relying on it as a source of income. Slavery was abolished in Montserrat by the Slavery Abolition Act 1833.

== Culture and influence ==
The remains of Irish culture in Montserrat are evident in modern times. This can be seen in the island's flag and coat of arms which portrays a woman with a harp and cross. Montserrat's national emblem is an Irish shamrock adorning Government house, again associated with the traditional Irish shamrock. The shamrock also appears in passport and postage stamps, as well as tourist-related buildings and signage. Other cultural influences include music, value systems, and the Irish recipe for the national dish "goat water stew." In 2002, Montserrat introduced their national dress, an "Irish tartan," that is green, gold and white, evoking both their Irish and African cultural heritage. The spoken language of the island is English and the native inhabitants of Montserrat speak with a hint of an Irish accent.

Flag of Montserrat

=== St. Patrick's Day ===
Identified as a national holiday in Montserrat, Saint Patrick's Day is a week long festival celebrated every year since 1985. The true meaning of the celebration is a bit controversial. In its beginnings, Saint Patrick's Day was meant as a day spent in celebration of the 1768 uprising against the plantation owners. March 17 can also be called "Heroes Day," due to Sir Howard A. Fergus' work in popularising the uprising. Today, it is celebrated more as the traditional Irish Saint Patrick's Day. Along with traditional Caribbean entertainment, the festival also provides a rich mix of African and Irish heritage. Many typical Irish images are displayed, such as shamrocks, leprechauns, and Guinness beer, but African heritage is included in the incorporation of dance and music into celebrations, as well as certain events such as the "Slave Feast." This Irish celebration in Montserrat is promoted as a tourist attraction, and represents an economic opportunity by attracting members of the Irish diaspora to the island for the celebrations.

== See also ==
- List of expatriate Irish populations
- Irish immigration to Barbados
