= Fèlix Maria Falguera =

Fèlix Maria de Falguera i de Puiguriguer (Spanish: Félix María de Falguera i de Puiguriguer; Mataró, Barcelona, 28 January 1811 - Barcelona, August 1897) was a Spanish jurist and the country's leading authority in matters of notarial law in the 19th century.

From 1844 on, Puiguriguer taught at the Escuela de Notaría in Barcelona. He also founded the professional journal La Notaría, which published most of his work.

== Works ==
- Teórica del Arte de Notaría, Barcelona, Manuel Saurí y Eudaldo Puig editores, 1875
