= José Manuel Aguirre Miramón =

Spanish jurist, politician, and writer

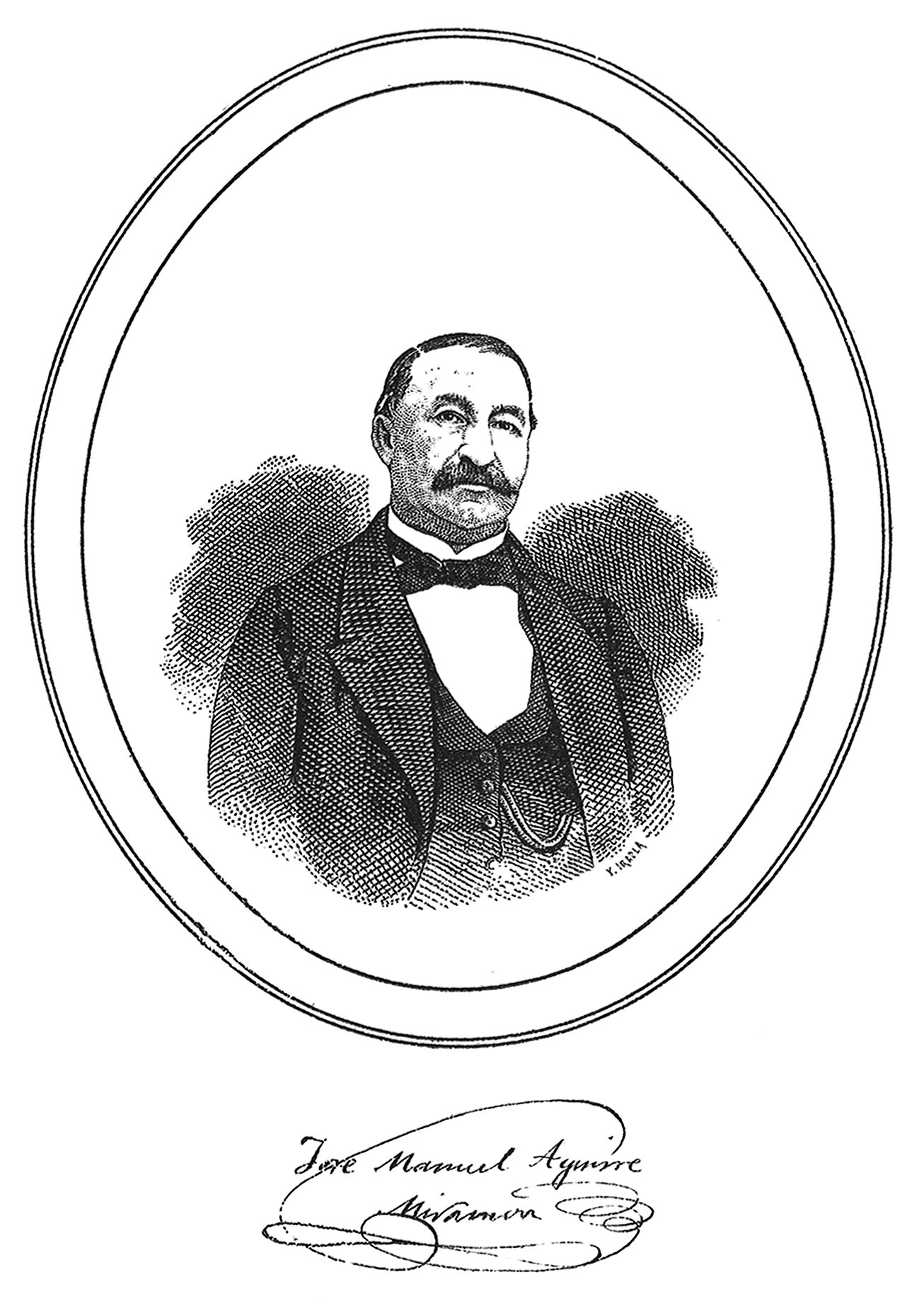
- Born: January 1, 1812; San Sebastián
- Died: March 31, 1887 (aged 75); San Sebastián or Tolosa
- Occupations: jurist, politician, writer

José Manuel Aguirre Miramón (1812–1887) was a Spanish jurist, politician and writer.

== Early life and education ==
José Manuel Aguirre Miramón was born in San Sebastián in 1812 into a wealthy family. He began his studies at the Royal Seminary of Bergara, continued his education by earning a law degree from the University of Oñate and eventually obtaining a doctorate from the University of Zaragoza. He went on to hold a law professorship at this university, but dissatisfied with his work as a lecturer, he prepared for the judicial exams.

== Career ==
In 1837, he was appointed as a first-instance judge in Castro Urdiales, beginning his career in the judiciary. From there, he was transferred to the courts of Tolosa and Vitoria. His judicial career continued overseas when he was sent to Manila in 1844. In the Philippines, he was promoted to magistrate of the Royal Audience of Manila, and later held a similar position in Havana. His work in the Philippines was highly effective; he focused mainly on improving the administration, but also took an interest in agriculture, writing a report on the organization and improvement of agriculture in the Philippines. His stay in the colonies lasted until 1859, when he returned to Spain. Upon his return, he became a member of scientific and legal associations of the time.

== Works ==
He published numerous papers and articles, especially related to the legal aspects of colonization. Among his works are:

- Application of the new mortgage law to the overseas provinces. (1861)
- Application of the Criminal Code to the overseas provinces. (1861)
- Directorships of overseas. (1861)
- From overseas legislation in relation to the different races of the population of the Philippines. (1861)
- Proprietorship of artists in their art works. (1862)
- Judicial power in the Spanish-American republics. (1862)
- Mortgage law reform Overseas (1862)
- Influence of wine desestanco coconut and nipa in crime in the Philippines. (1863)
- Of special overseas laws and reform. (1863)
- Causes of certiorari by the Indian Chamber of the Supreme Court of Justice. (1863)
- Foreign law: administrative and civil institutions of China. (1864)
- Legal and administrative reforms on the island of Santo Domingo. (1864)
- Legislation overseas. Philippines: usurious contracts. (1864)
- Executive action: award of costs to the judges. (1864)
- Overseas Legislation: Implementation of the Code of Civil Procedure to the islands of Cuba and Puerto Rico (1866)
- Penal Code Enforcement overseas. (1871)

== Political career ==
Aguirre Miramón was part of the liberal foralism, a political doctrine that emerged after the end of the First Carlist War, advocating for the adaptation of the Basque foral laws to the liberal state. Between 1865 and 1866, he was a Deputy in the Congress, representing the Province of Guipúzcoa. In 1869, he was elected General Deputy of Guipúzcoa. During his term, he was particularly focused on projects aimed at improving the port of Pasajes.

He was elected senator three times by the Province of Guipúzcoa. His first election coincided with the beginning of the Third Carlist War in 1872. After his first term as senator (1872–1873), he was reelected in 1876 and 1877, during the Restoration period. In the Senate, he advocated for the preservation of the Basque Foral laws and their compatibility with the Spanish Constitution. However, the Foral laws were ultimately repealed on July 21, 1876. Following the repeal of the Forals, he was appointed president of the General Deputation in 1880.

He died in San Sebastián on March 31, 1887.
