= Pedro Cevallos =

Spanish politician and diplomat

The Most Excellent Pedro Cevallos
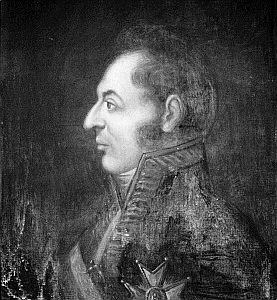
- Portrait by an unknown author

Prime Minister of Spain
- In office 13 December 1799 – 3 March 1808
- Monarch: Charles IV
- Preceded by: Mariano Luis de Urquijo
- Succeeded by: Gonzalo O'Farrill
- In office 19 March 1808 – 7 July 1808
- Monarchs: Ferdinand VII (March-May); Joseph Bonaparte
- Preceded by: Gonzalo O'Farrill
- Succeeded by: Mariano Luis de Urquijo y Muga

Personal details
- Born: Pedro Cevallos Guerra; 1 August 1759 San Felices de Buelna, Spain
- Died: 29 May 1838 (aged 78) Seville, Spain

Pedro Cevallos Guerra (1 August 1759 – 29 May 1838) was a Spanish statesman and diplomat who served as Chief Minister from 1799 to 1808 during the Napoleonic Wars, although Manuel Godoy, a personal favourite of the Spanish King, had a vast influence over political affairs.

== Early life ==
Cevallos was born in Cantabria in 1759. He was educated at various schools and convents before matriculating at Valladolid University in 1777 to study law. He was very successful, and in 1781 joined the faculty as a professor, remaining there until 1790.

== Diplomatic and political career ==
In 1790 Cevallos switched to the diplomatic service, serving from 1793 to 1795 as First Secretary to the Spanish Embassy in Lisbon. He then returned home and worked for the finance ministry.

== Chief Minister ==
In 1799, the Spanish King Charles IV appointed Cevallos as Secretary of State, the de facto Chief Minister, which office he held until 1808. Cevallos lacked the power and discretion of many of his predecessors as he was forced to share power with the ambitious Manuel de Godoy, a former Secretary, who held no official role but wielded enormous power.

=== French invasion ===
Spain's situation had been precarious since the beginning of the Napoleonic Wars and in 1808 it grew worse. Spain and France had agreed to launch a joint invasion of their traditional and mutual enemy Portugal – but France had planned to betray their Spanish allies and conquer Spain as well. When this dawned on the Spanish elite, they pressed the King to abdicate. His successor, Crown Prince Ferdinand, chose to meet Napoleon in the Pyrenees and try to negotiate a cessation of hostilities, but was seized by the French and taken as a prisoner to France.

Cevallos tendered his resignation on 7 July and fled to London for the remainder of the war, returning to Spain once Madrid had been liberated in 1814. He briefly headed the new government from 15 November, before retiring on 24 January 1816. Cevallos died in 1838.

== See also ==
- List of prime ministers of Spain

Political offices
Preceded by Francisco Saavedra de Sangronis	Secretary of State (Chief Minister); 1799–1808	Succeeded by Gonzalo O'Farrill
Preceded by Gonzalo O'Farrill	Secretary of State (Chief Minister); 1808–1808	Succeeded by Mariano Luis de Urquijo
Preceded by José Miguel de Carvajal-Vargas	Secretary of State (Chief Minister); 1814–1816	Succeeded by Juan Esteban Lozano de Torres
Preceded by Juan Esteban Lozano de Torres	Secretary of State (Chief Minister); 1816–1816	Succeeded by José García de León y Pizarro
