= Mariano Luis de Urquijo =

Prime Minister of Spain

The Most Excellent Mariano Luis de Urquijo
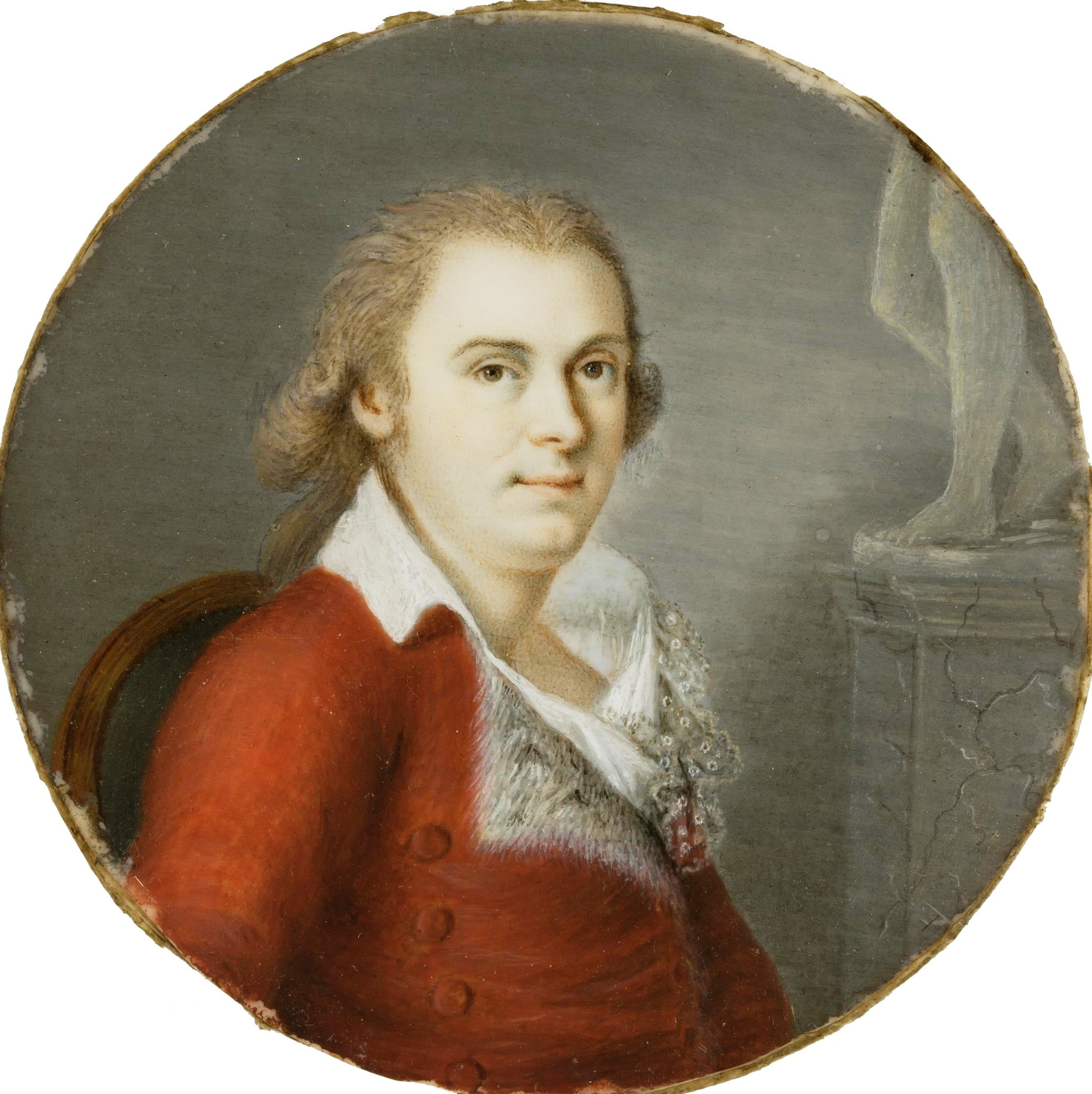
- Portrait by Guillermo Ducker, c. 1800

Prime Minister of Spain
- In office 12 February 1799 – 13 December 1799
- Monarch: Charles IV
- Preceded by: Francisco Saavedra de Sangronis
- Succeeded by: Pedro Cevallos
- In office 7 July 1808 – 27 June 1813
- Monarch: Joseph Bonaparte
- Preceded by: Pedro Cevallos
- Succeeded by: Juan O'Donojú

Personal details
- Born: Mariano Luis de Urquijo y Muga; 8 September 1769 Bilbao, Spain
- Died: 3 May 1817 (aged 47) Paris, France
- Resting place: Père Lachaise Cemetery

Mariano Luis de Urquijo y Muga (1769 in Bilbao, Spain – 1817 in Paris, France) was Secretary of State (Prime Minister) of Spain in 1799, during the reign of Charles IV. He later held the position again between 1808 and 1813 under Joseph Bonaparte.

== Biography ==
Born to a noble Basque family, he studied law in Madrid and Salamanca. He spent some time living in Ireland before entering the Spanish Foreign Service under the protection of the Count of Aranda and the Count of Floridablanca. It was in 1792, under the Aranda ministry, that he was named High Officer of the Secretary of State (Secretary of the Cabinet). Of progressive ideas, he translated the Death of Caesar of Voltaire, then forbidden by the Catholic Church. Due to this, he was prosecuted by the Holy Office.

Despite his French sympathies, he was appointed First Secretary of State (Prime Minister) on 12 February 1799 and remained in office until 13 December 1799. While in office, he did all he could to limit the power and influence of the Inquisition, which brought upon him the enmity of the Holy See. Taking advantage of the Napoleonic invasion of the Papal States, he initiated what became known as "Urquijo's Schism" (1799), attempting to reclaim the Spanish Church's powers that had previously been assumed by the Pope, including the authority over matrimonial dispensations.

Even though he was supported by some jansenist-leaning clerics such as the bishop of Salamanca, Antonio Tavira, his religious policies caused his fall from power. Manuel Godoy had resented Urquijo's rising influence at court, which had begun to eclipse his own. Aligning with Eusebio Bardají y Azara, an influential figure in his own right, and Napoleon, who feared Urquijo's policies opposing a French intervention in Portugal, they forced Urquijo's dismissal from office.

His brief term also saw several scientific enterprises being initiated: for instance, he helped arrange an audience with Charles IV for Alexander von Humboldt, enabling Humboldt to gain support for his American expedition. He was instrumental in sending Valentin de Foronda as General Consul of Spain in Philadelphia, (1801–1807), and as Spanish Plenipotentiary Minister in the USA 'til the nomination by the "Junta" of Luis de Onis in 1809.

Resenting the conservative and ultra-catholic policies of the Spanish court, he embraced the pro-French government of Joseph Bonaparte once Napoleon invaded Spain and replaced Charles IV with his own brother Joseph as King of Spain. After publicly acknowledging Joseph as the lawful King of Spain, Urquijo was called back to court and to become Prime Minister again. He remained in office from 7 July 1808 to 27 June 1813. However, he was unable to carry out any policies apart from assisting French forces during the Peninsular War.

Following the French defeat, Urquijo fled with King Joseph across the Pyrenees to France, where he went into exile. He died in Paris in 1817.
