= Esteban Manuel de Villegas =

17th-century Spanish poet

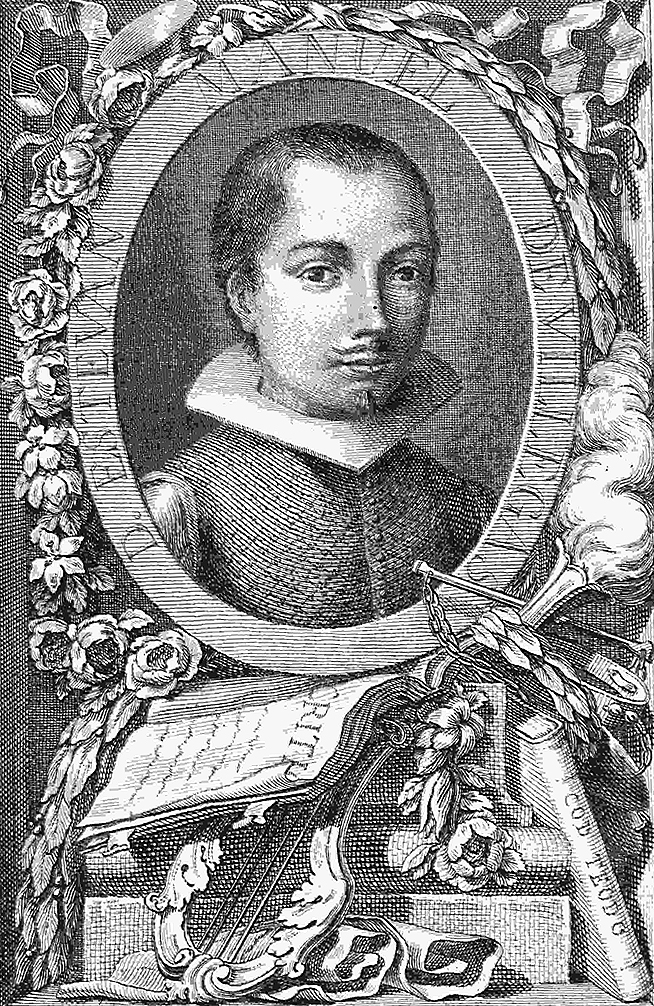
Esteban Manuel de Villegas

Esteban Manuel de Villegas (5 February 1589, in Matute, La Rioja – 3 September 1669, in Nájera, La Rioja) was a 17th-century Spanish poet.

== Biography ==
Villegas studied grammar in Madrid and later enrolled at the University of Salamanca on 20 November 1610. There he obtained a degree in Law, though he never entered the legal profession. Though he was the royal treasurer in Nájera, he did not obtain any of the positions he wanted. Despite coming from a wealthy family, he spent his entire life in financial difficulties due to his numerous children and his continuous involvement in litigation. At the age of 36, he married Doña Antonia de Leyva Villodas, twenty years younger than him. In 1659 he was tried by the Inquisition which accused him of believing himself in possession of the absolute truth. He was jailed after responding that he knew more about thorny questions than the Church Fathers. He wrote satires against religious communities. Many of these writings are lost, as they were confiscated by the Inquisition. The Inquisition condemned him to four years of exile in Santa María Ribarredonda, but he was pardoned after a year. It seems probable that the rest of the sentence was remitted, for the report of the local inquisition lays stress on Villegas’s simple piety, on the extravagance of his attire, and on the eccentricity of his general conduct and conversation, so marked as to suggest a mental disturbance. He died at the age of 80 in Nájera.

== Works ==
Villegas wrote a lyrical book that was very original for its time, "Las Eróticas" (Nájera, 1618, later widely reprinted, especially by Sancha in Madrid, 1774 and 1797), the title-page of which bore under a rising sun the motto "Me surgente, quid istae?". This book earned him more than a few enemies because of his excessive pride, and he tried to suppress the emblem of the copies that he could; Lope de la Vega referred to this in his Laurels for Apollo, but did not mention Villegas by name.

The book is divided into two parts; the first is written in heptasyllables, imitation of Anacreontic style and matter; the second is in endecasyllables, being historical in content. It contained very delicate poems in short meters, which he managed with special skill. This book of poems contains very free translations of Horace, elegies, idylls, epigrams and some sonnets. It handles the syllables quantitatively and it uses Sapphic, Adonic, and Anacreontic meters rather than the forms then current in Spanish literature. This is why his poetry is purely formal, strictly following form and with many circumlocutions. For this reason he set a strong precedent for Neoclassicism in the 18th century. His longer works have a strong flavour of culterano, as in his Ode to Philip III. His intention to introduce quantitative meter only appears in his introduction to the "adónicos sáficos", since these lend themselves well to a hendecasyllabic form:

Dulce vecino de la verde selva
huesped eterno del Abril florido,
vital aliento de la madre Venus,
Zephyro blando,

—"Saphicos", lines 1-4

Sweet denizen of verdant woods,
eternal guest of flowery April,
vital breath of mother Venus,
soft Zephyr.

He also, fortunately, tried to adapt Spanish poetry to the Anacreontic style; he was imitated during the 18th century in this lyric subgenre, specially cultivated in Villegas' style, particularly by Juan Meléndez Valdés and José Iglesias de la Casa. Also his gracefully rhythmic pastoral "Cantilenas" was much imitated. At an advanced age, he translated Boethius' De consolatione Philosophiae and, wiser after his encounter with the Inquisition, left in Latin the part corresponding to free will. He wrote in addition two volumes of Disertaciones in which he commented on the classics that had been lost. This work was lost into the hands of Father Martín Sarmiento shortly thereafter. In addition he composed "Discurso contra las comedias" and "Antiteatro", which were never published.
