= 1791 in Spain =

- Decades: 1770s; 1780s; 1790s; 1800s; 1810s
- See also: History of Spain; Timeline of Spanish history; List of years in Spain

Events from the year 1791 in Spain

== Incumbents ==
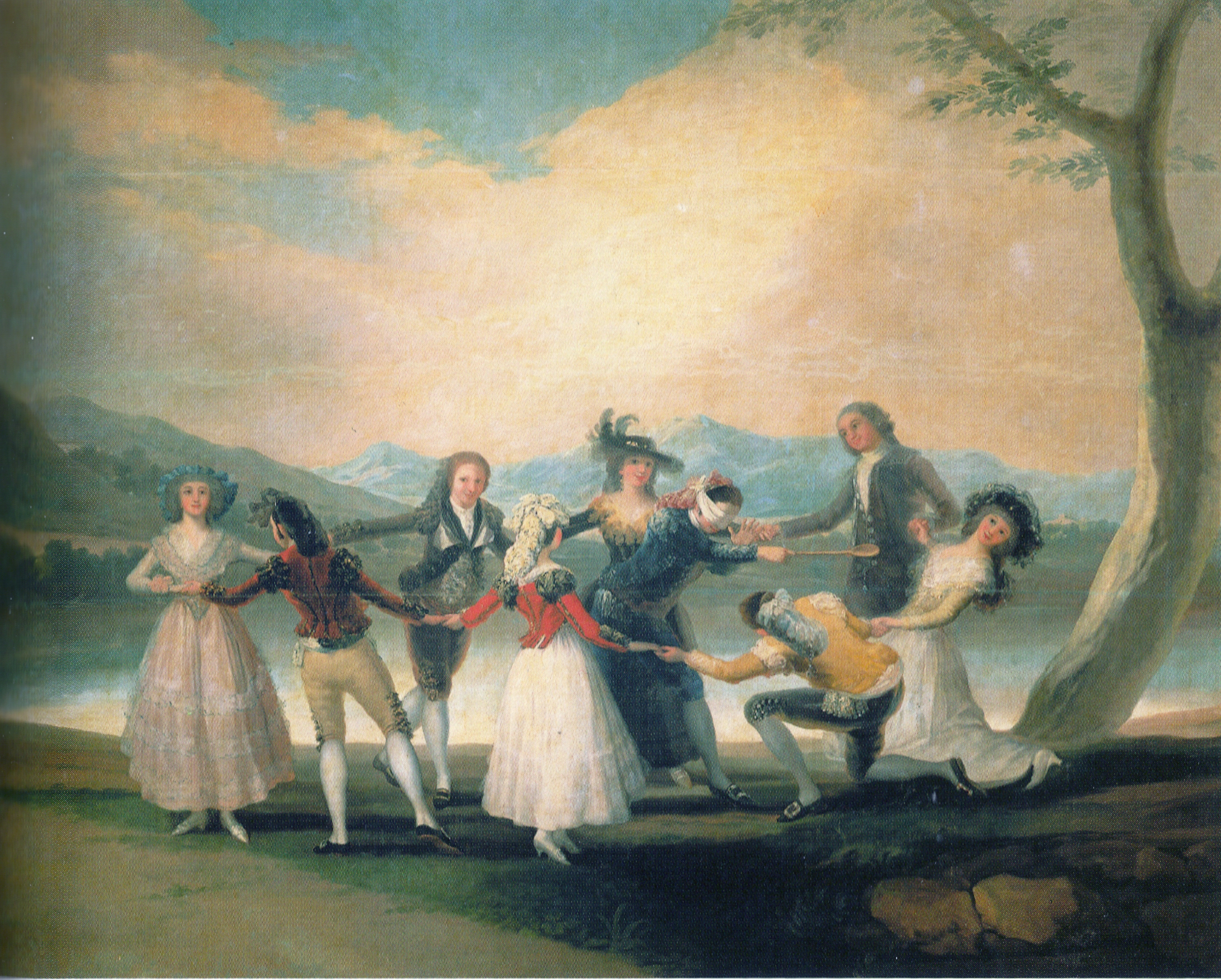
Goya, Francisco - Das Blindekuhspiel - 1791

- Monarch – Charles IV
- Hector, baron de Carondelet
- First Secretary of State - José Moñino

== Events ==
Sources:

- 15 August - Spanish-Moroccan War resumes after failed peace talks.
- 21 August - Haitian Slave Revolt against France begins, with Spanish support and intervention given in St. Domingue.
- 24 August - Spain bombards Tangier in a response to Moroccan Sultan Moulay Yazid’s declaration of war and siege of Ceuta.
- 1 September - Morocco begins to withdraw due to low morale, economic strain, and internal strife.
- 22 December - Spain offers to negotiate an American treaty on Mississippi River navigation and port use.

== Births ==
- January 6 - Jose Melchor Gomiz
- February 16 - Infanta María Teresa
- March 10 - Manuela Malasaña
- March 10 - Ángel de Saavedra, 3rd Duke of Rivas
- July 9 - Nicolás Ledesma

== Deaths ==
- 25 August - José Iglesias de la Casa (born 1748)
- 15 September - Tomás de Iriarte
- Unknown between 1789-1791 - Pedro Fitz-James Stuart
