= 1788 in architecture =

The year 1788 in architecture involved some significant events.

== Buildings and structures ==
=== Buildings ===
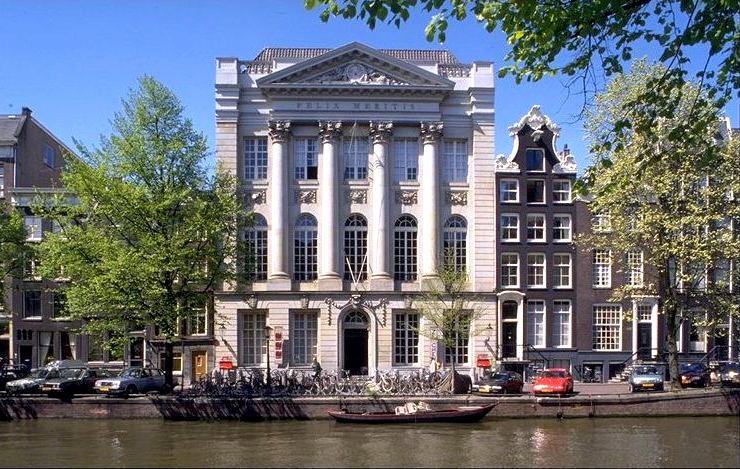
Felix Meritis on the Keizersgracht in Amsterdam, built and restored as a cultural centre

- Felix Meritis in Amsterdam (Netherlands), designed by Jacob Otten Husly, is opened.
- De Kleine Komedie in Amsterdam, designed by Abraham van der Hart, is completed.
- Théâtre Graslin in Nantes (France), designed by Mathurin Crucy, is opened.
- Theater in der Josefstadt, Vienna is established.
- Theatre Royal in Richmond, North Yorkshire, England, is built.
- Sofia Albertina Church in Scania (Sweden), designed by Carl Hårleman before his death in 1753, is inaugurated.
- Capilla de Ánimas in Santiago de Compostela (Spain) is completed.
- St. Spyridon Church, Peroj (Croatia) is completed.
- St Gregory's Church, Preshome (Scotland), designed by Father John Reid, is built.
- Façade of St. Anne's Church, Warsaw, by Chrystian Piotr Aigner, is completed.
- Admiralty House, London, designed by Samuel Pepys Cockerell, is opened.
- Palazzo Beneventano del Bosco in Syracuse, Sicily, rebuilt by Luciano Alì, is completed.
- Arresødal on Zealand (Denmark) is completed.
- Eriksholm Castle on the Isefjord (Denmark), designed by Caspar Frederik Harsdorff, is completed.
- Sandbjerg in Jutland (Denmark) is built.
- Terraced houses in England at Camden Crescent, Bath and 32–44, Caledonia Place, Clifton, Bristol, designed by John Eveleigh, are built.
- Second Walton Bridge over the River Thames in England, designed by James Paine, is opened.

== Births ==
- February 25 – Thomas Cubitt, English builder (died 1855)
- April 27 – Charles Robert Cockerell, English architect (died 1863)
- November – William Strickland, American architect (died 1854)

== Deaths ==
- February 2 – James "Athenian" Stuart, English neoclassical architect (born 1733)
- September 27 – Sir Robert Taylor, English stonemason, sculptor and architect (born 1714)
