= 1788 in Spain =

- Decades: 1760s; 1770s; 1780s; 1790s; 1800s
- See also: History of Spain; Timeline of Spanish history; List of years in Spain

Events from the year 1788 in Spain

== Incumbents ==
- Monarch – Charles III until December 14, Charles IV from December 14
- First Secretary of State - José Moñino

== Events ==
- - Charles IV succeed to the throne.
- - Capela de Ánimas

== Births ==
- 25 February - Mateo Ferrer, composer (died 1864)
- 29 March - Carlos María Borbón-Parma, Infante of spain (died 1855)
