= 1714 in architecture =

The year 1714 in architecture involved some significant events.

== Buildings and structures ==
=== Buildings ===
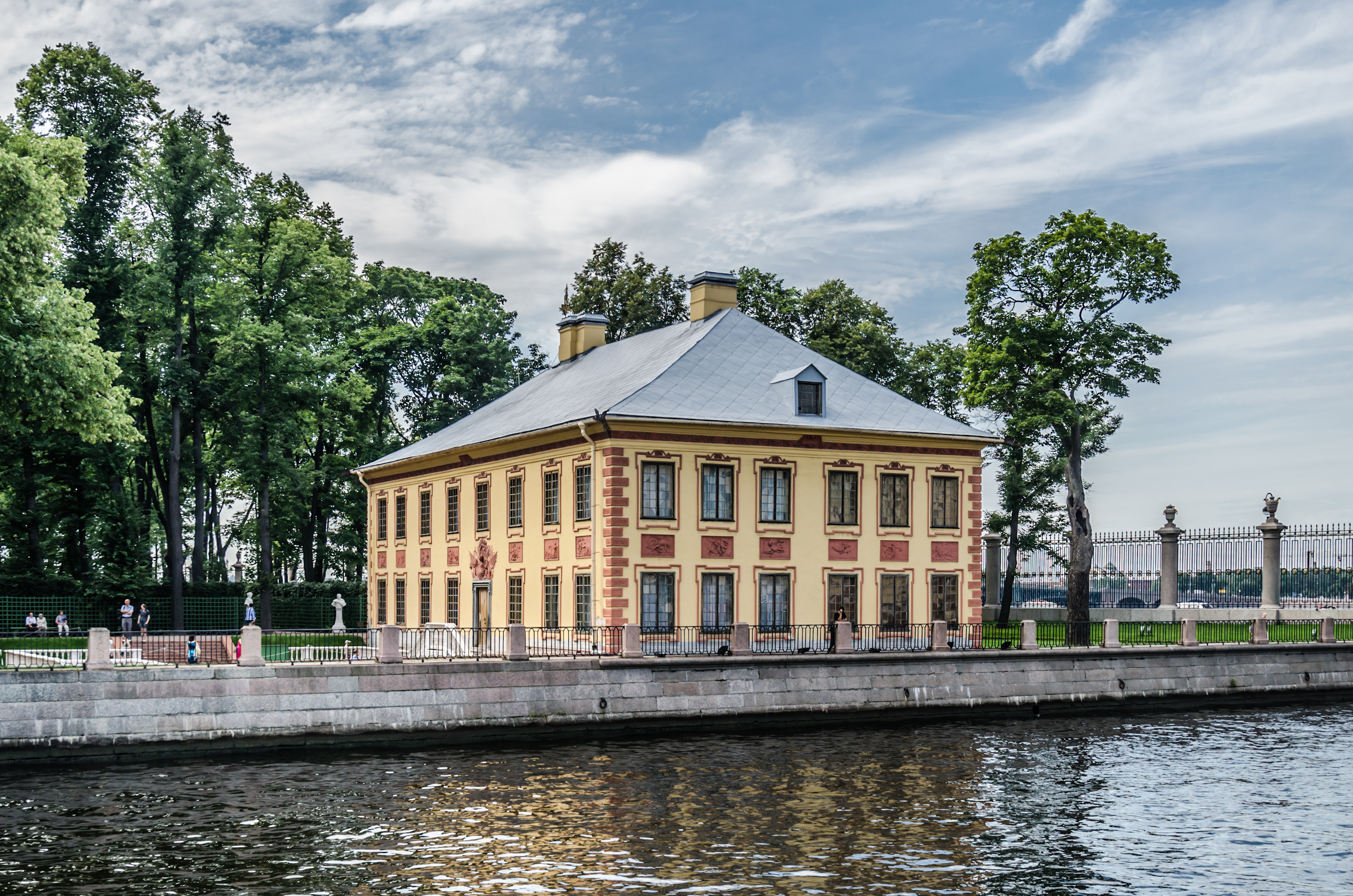
Summer Palace of Peter the Great, St Petersburg

- St Alfege Church, Greenwich, London, designed by Nicholas Hawksmoor, is completed.
- Church of St Mary's, Twickenham, London, designed by John James, is consecrated.
- Church of Santissime Stimmate di San Francesco in Rome, designed by Giovanni Battista Contini, is completed.
- Church of Tolentini, Venice, is completed to designs of 1590 by Vincenzo Scamozzi with a portico by Andrea Tirali.
- Altar of the 22-domed wooden summer Church of the Transfiguration at Kizhi Pogost in Karelia is laid.
- Geffrye Almshouses in London built.
- Summer Palace of Peter the Great in Saint Petersburg, designed by Domenico Trezzini, is completed.
- Bellevue Palace, Kassel, built as an observatory.
- Sint-Lodewijkscollege (Lokeren) in Belgium built as a private house.
- Wotton House in Buckinghamshire, England, is completed.
- Llanelly House in south Wales is built.

== Births ==
- April 1 – Jean-François de Neufforge, Flemish architect and engraver (died 1791)
- Robert Taylor, English architect (died 1788)

== Deaths ==
- May – Andreas Schlüter, German baroque sculptor and architect (born 1664)
- Pietro Perti, Swiss-Italian baroque sculptor and architect working in Lithuania (born 1648)
