= José Iglesias =

José Iglesias may refer to:

- Jose Iglesias (baseball) (born 1990), Cuban baseball player
- José Iglesias de la Casa (1748–1791), Spanish Roman Catholic priest
- José Iglesias Fernández (1926–2007), Spanish footballer
- José María Iglesias (1823–1891), Mexican lawyer and journalist
- José María Martín de Herrera y de la Iglesia (1835–1922), Spanish Roman Catholic cardinal
- Tanguito (1944-1972), Argentine singer-songwriter whose full name is José Alberto Iglesias
