= 1791 in architecture =

The year 1791 in architecture involved some significant architectural events and new buildings.

== Events ==
- The elevations of Charlotte Square in Edinburgh, Scotland, are designed by Robert Adam.
- Polish architect Jakub Kubicki is ennobled.

== Buildings and structures ==
=== Buildings opened ===
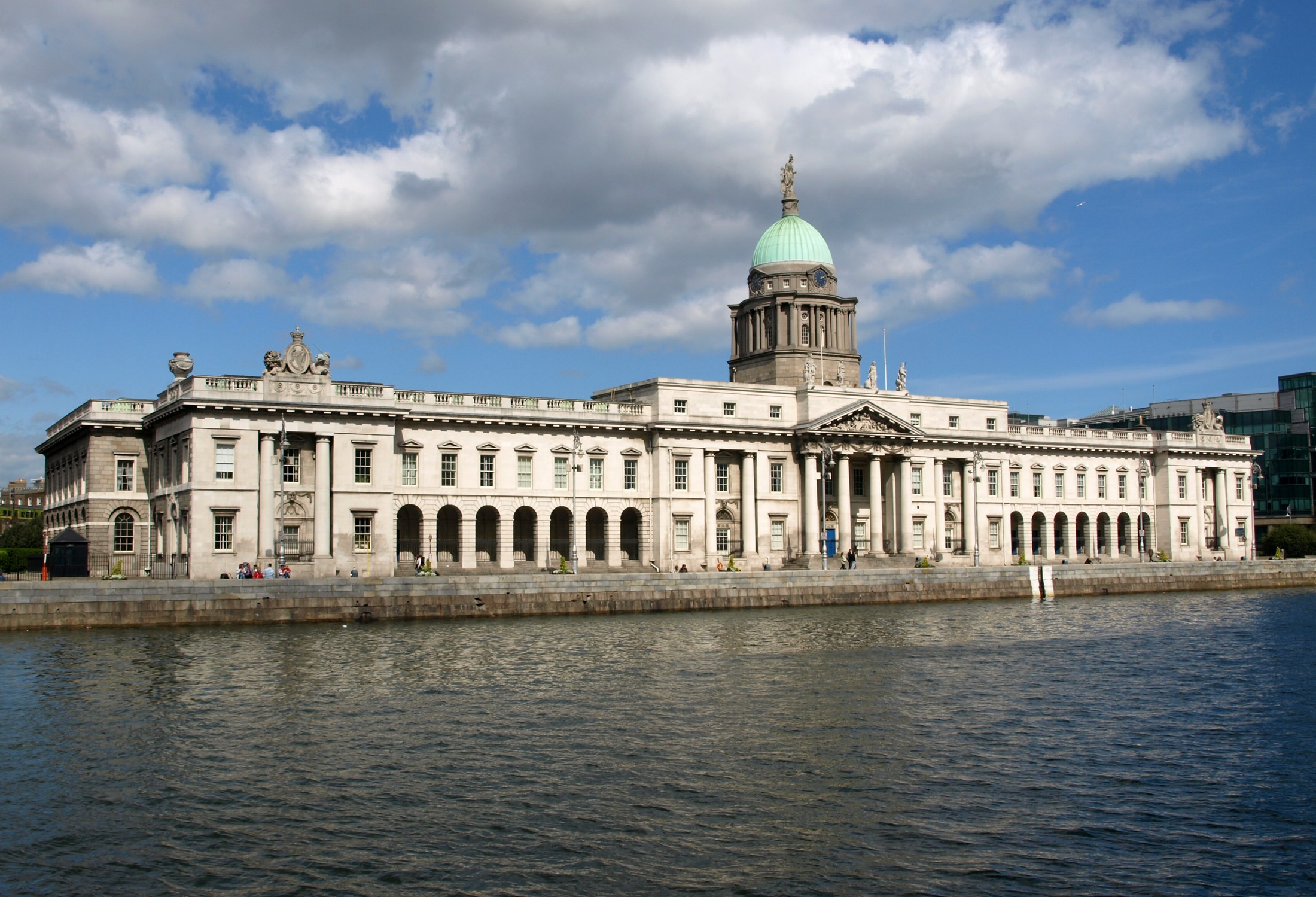
The Custom House, Dublin

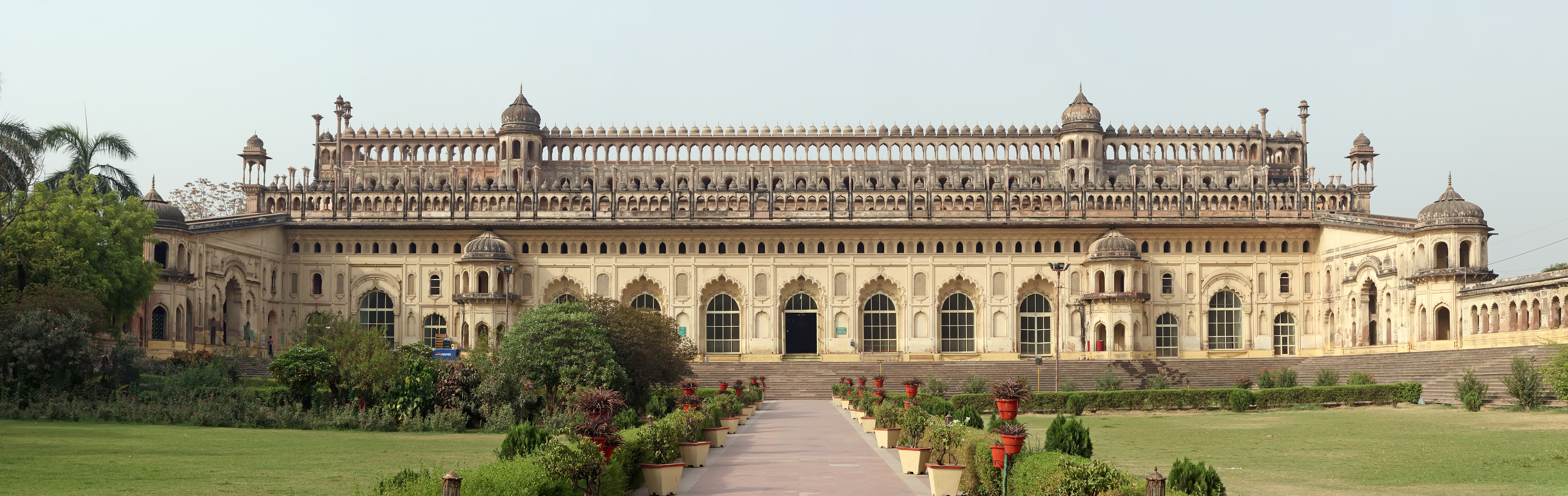
Bara Imambara, Lucknow

- January 6 – Théâtre Feydeau, Paris, designed by Jacques Legrand and Jacques Molinos.
- November 7 – Custom House, Dublin, Ireland, designed by James Gandon.

=== Buildings completed ===
- Bara Imambara, Lucknow, India
- Brandenburg Gate, Berlin, Germany
- Clyne Castle, Swansea, Wales, built by Richard Phillips
- Gammel Køgegård, Køge, Denmark (main house)
- Buenos Aires Metropolitan Cathedral, Argentina (rebuilt)
- Plaza Mayor, Madrid, remodelling by Juan de Villanueva
- Rock Castle (Hendersonville, Tennessee), United States, home of Daniel Smith.
- Tower of Hercules (lighthouse) in Spain (remodelling)
- Dar Hassan Pacha (palace) in the Casbah of Algiers.

== Births ==
- January 14 – Thomas Oliver, English neoclassical architect (died 1857)
- March 15 – Lewis Vulliamy, English architect (died 1871)
- April 17 (bapt.) – William Cubitt, English building and civil engineering contractor and politician (died 1863)
- June 7 – Giacomo Moraglia, Milanese neoclassical architect (died 1860)

== Deaths ==
- December 19 – Jean-François de Neufforge, Flemish architect and engraver (born 1714)
