= 1776 in Spain =

- Decades: 1750s; 1760s; 1770s; 1780s; 1790s
- See also: History of Spain; Timeline of Spanish history; List of years in Spain

The year 1776 was a period of enlightenment and change for Spain, a nation then under the rule of King Charles III, one of the most progressive Bourbon monarchs. This era, part of the Age of Enlightenment in Europe, saw Spain grapple with internal reforms and external challenges that would shape its trajectory towards modernization.

== Incumbents ==
- Monarch – Charles III
- First Secretary of State - Jerónimo Grimaldi

== Overview ==
- In 1776, Spain was a global empire, with territories spanning from Europe to the Americas and the Philippines. The influence of the Enlightenment was evident in the Spanish court, where ideas of rational governance, economic reform, and scientific progress were taking root under the guidance of Charles III and his enlightened ministers. The Presidio of San Francisco is also founded in New Spain on September 17.

== Governance and Politics ==
- King Charles III continued his efforts to modernize Spain's administration and infrastructure. He was known for his "Regalismo" policy, which aimed to reduce the power of the church and increase the power of the state. This year also saw further implementation of the Bourbon Reforms, which were intended to strengthen the empire and consolidate royal authority.

== Births ==
- February 20 - Mariano Ricafort Palacín y Abarca, Spanish colonial governor of Cuba (d. 1846)
- June 12 - José Manuel de Goyeneche, 1st Count of Guaqui, Spanish soldier, diplomat (d. 1846)
- August 18 - Agustín Argüelles, Spanish liberal politician (d. 1844)
- October 4 - Mariano Lagasca, Spanish botanist (d. 1839)
- October 6 - James Duff, 4th Earl Fife, Scottish-born Spanish general (d. 1857)
- December 16 - Narciso Durán, Spanish Franciscan missionary to Mexico (d. 1846)
- December 19 - Eusebio Bardají y Azara, Prime Minister of Spain (d. 1842)

== Deaths ==
- October 30 – Simón de Anda y Salazar, Spanish Basque governor of the Philippines from July (b. 1709)
- November 15 – Fernando de Silva, 12th Duke of Alba, Spanish duke (b. 1714)
