= 1794 in Spain =

- Decades: 1770s; 1780s; 1790s; 1800s; 1810s
- See also: History of Spain; Timeline of Spanish history; List of years in Spain

Events in the year 1794 in Spain.

== Incumbents ==
- Monarch: Charles IV

== Events ==
- January 28 - Capture of Fort-Dauphin (1794)
- April 29-May 1 - Second Battle of Boulou
- July 23-August 1 - Battle of the Baztan Valley
- August 13 - Battle of San Lorenzo de la Muga
- October 15–17 - Battle of Orbaitzeta
- November 17–20 - Battle of the Black Mountain

== Deaths ==
- November 20 - Luis Firmín de Carvajal, Conde de la Unión, Peruvian-born general, killed during the Siege of Roses (1794–95) (born 1752)
