= 1779 in Spain =

- Decades: 1750s; 1760s; 1770s; 1780s; 1790s
- See also: History of Spain; Timeline of Spanish history; List of years in Spain

Events from the year 1779 in Spain.

== Incumbents ==
- Monarch: Charles III
- First Secretary of State - José Moñino

== Events ==
- April 12 - Treaty of Aranjuez (1779)

== Births ==
- October 25 - Pedro Velarde y Santillán (d. 1808)
