= 1774 in Spain =

- Decades: 1750s; 1760s; 1770s; 1780s; 1790s
- See also: History of Spain; Timeline of Spanish history; List of years in Spain

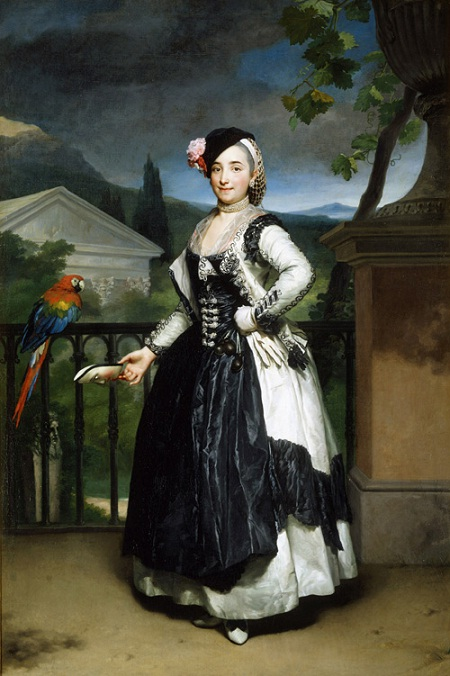
Marquesa Llano

Events from the year 1774 in Spain

== Incumbents ==
- Monarch – Charles III
- First Secretary of State - Jerónimo Grimaldi

== Events ==
- Siege of Melilla (1774), would continue into 1775

== Births ==
- 6 April – José de Córdoba y Rojas, admiral (died 1810)
