= 1783 in Spain =

- Decades: 1760s; 1770s; 1780s; 1790s; 1800s
- See also: History of Spain; Timeline of Spanish history; List of years in Spain

This article is about the year 1783 in Spain.

== Incumbents ==
- Monarch - Charles III
- First Secretary of State - José Moñino

== Events ==
- January 20 - Preliminary peace treaty signed between Britain and Spain
- February 3 - Spain recognizes the United States
- November 24 – Royal Cedula of Population

== Births ==
- April 10 - Francisco de Longa (d. 1831 or 1842)

== Notable deaths ==
- March 2 - Francisco Salzillo, sculptor (b. 1707)
- June 1 - Domingo Elizondo, soldier (b. 1710)
