= 1786 in Spain =

- Decades: 1760s; 1770s; 1780s; 1790s; 1800s
- See also: History of Spain; Timeline of Spanish history; List of years in Spain

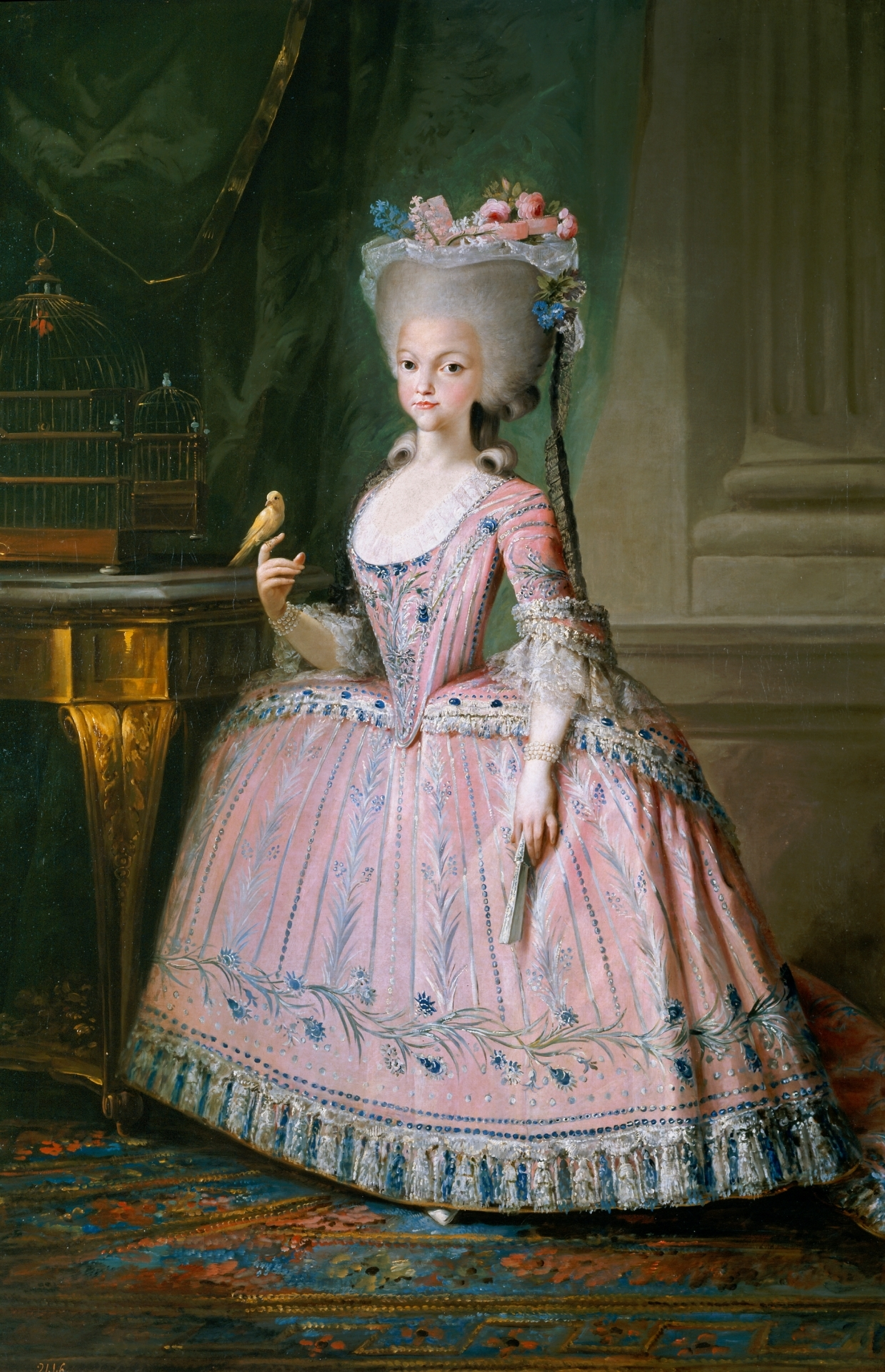
Carlota Joaquina de Boubon

Events from the year 1786 in Spain.

== Incumbents ==
- Monarch – Charles III
- First Secretary of State - José Moñino

== Events ==
- The Jay-Gardoqui Treaty between America and Spain failed to be ratified.
- A Treaty of Navigation and Commerce was signed between the Britannick King and the Moft Christian King.
- Convention of London (1786), a treaty between Britain and Spain over Belize.
- Malaria epidemic in Barcelona ends after killing nearly 100,000 people.

== Births ==
- Agustina de Aragón, Spanish Heroine, Mar 4th.

== Deaths ==
- Leopoldo de Gregorio, Marquis of Esquilache (1700–1786) – A key figure in the reformist government of Charles III.
- Carlos Francisco de Croix, Marquis of Croix (1699–1786) – He was a prominent Spanish military officer and colonial administrator.
- Gaspar de Portolá, Spanish Military Officer (1716–1786) - He was a well renowned Spanish Military Officer and the first Governor of the Californias.
