= 1780 in Spain =

- Decades: 1760s; 1770s; 1780s; 1790s; 1800s
- See also: History of Spain; Timeline of Spanish history; List of years in Spain

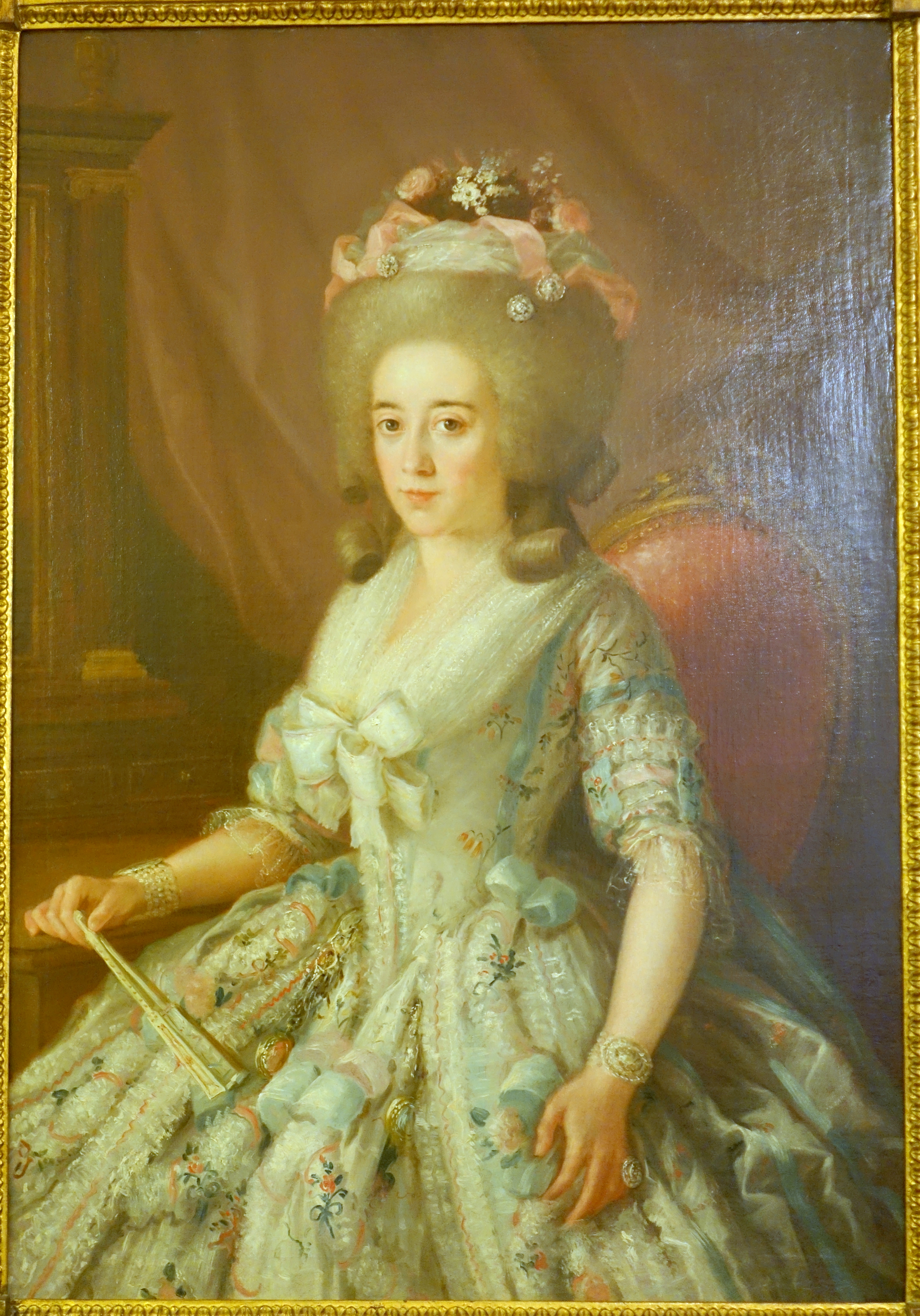
Portrait of a Woman by Agustin Esteve, Madrid, 1780-1785 AD, oil on canvas - Museo Nacional de Artes Decorativas - Madrid, Spain - DSC08322

Events from the year 1780 in Spain

== Incumbents ==
- Monarch – Charles III
- First Secretary of State - José Moñino

== Events ==
- January 16-17: Battle of Cape St. Vincent
- December 25: Treaty of Aranjuez

== Births ==
- Miguel Parra Abril, court painter.

== Deaths ==
- April 28: Juan de Miralles, 66, diplomat and arms dealer during the American Revolutionary War, pneumonia.
- May 11: Nicolás Fernández de Moratín, 42, writer and dramatist.
