= Matute =

- Municipality
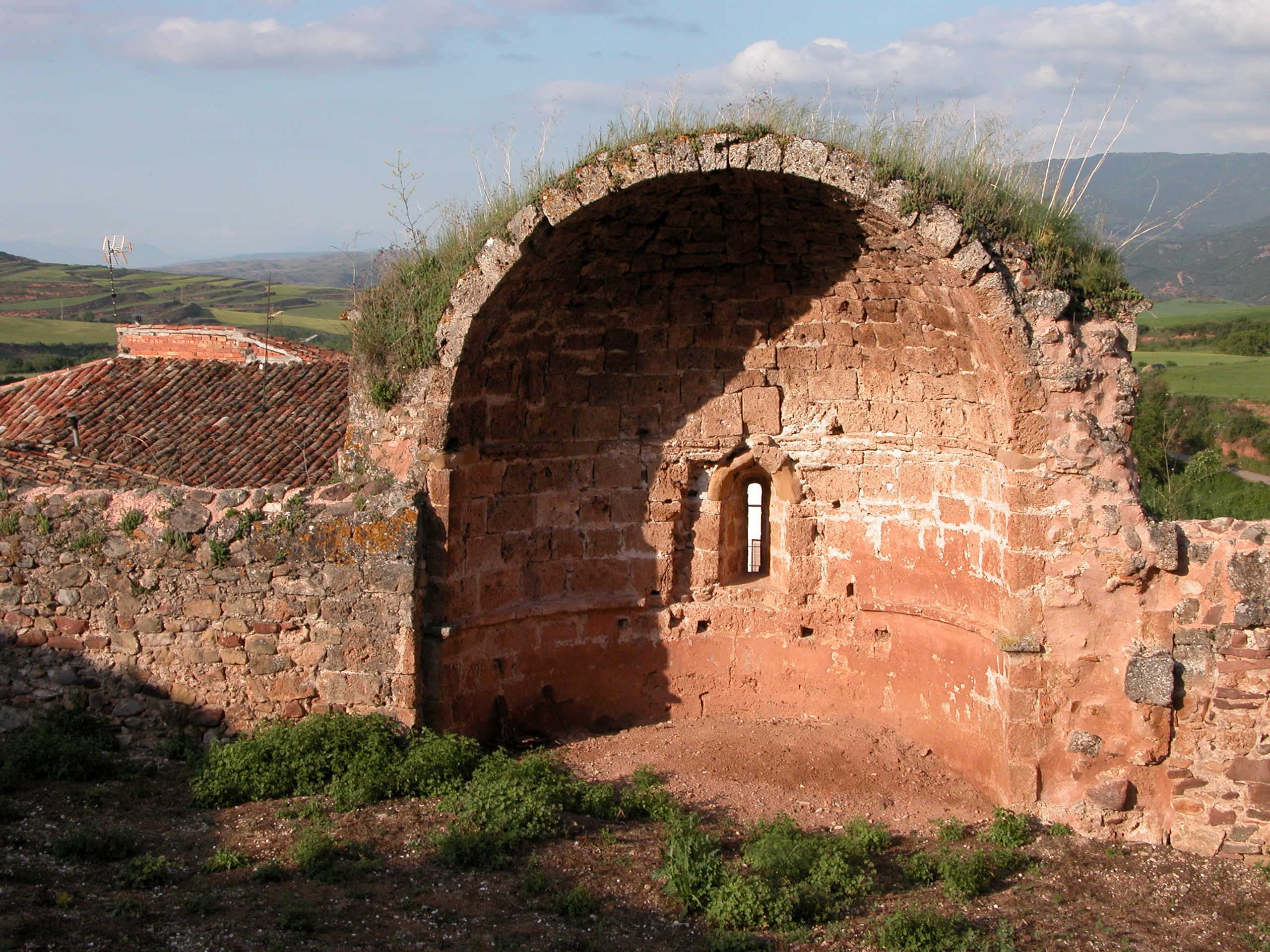
- Ruins of the chapel of San Miguel

- Location within La Rioja, Spain Location within Spain
- Coordinates: 42°17′55″N 2°47′42″W
- Country: Spain
- Autonomous community: La Rioja
- Comarca: Anguiano

Government
  - Mayor: José Ciriaco Lozano Corral (PSOE)

Area
  - Total: 25.65 km^{2} (9.90 sq mi)
- Elevation: 682 m (2,238 ft)

Population (2025-01-01)
  - Total: 88
- Postal code: 26321
- Website: Official website

Matute is a village in the province and autonomous community of La Rioja, Spain. The municipality covers an area of 25.65 square kilometres (9.90 sq mi) and as of 2011 had a population of 142 people.
