= Capela de Ánimas =

Chapel in the Old City of Santiago de Compostela, Spain

Coordinates: 42°52′54″N 8°32′31″W

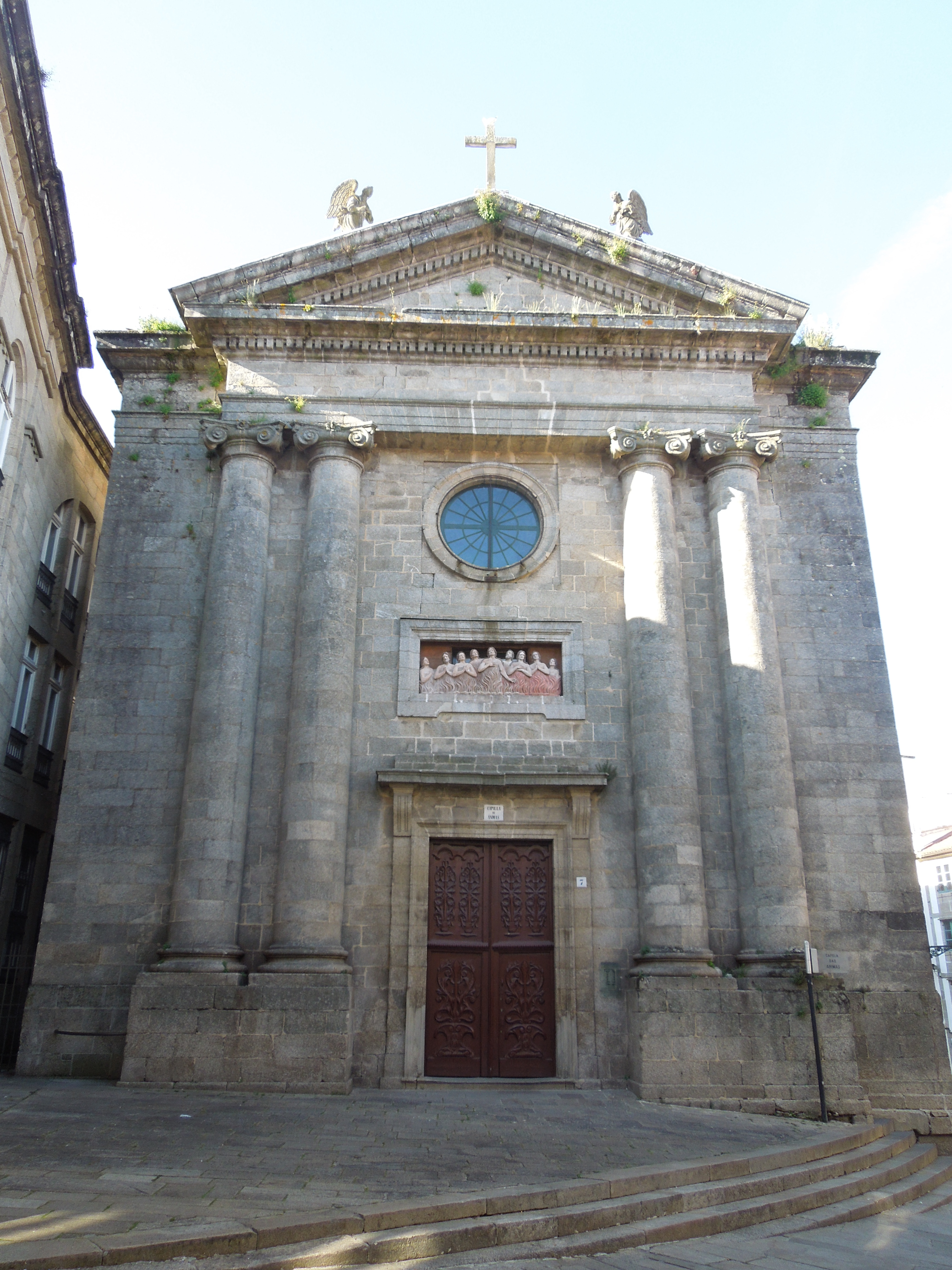

Religion
- Affiliation: Roman Catholic
- Ecclesiastical or organizational status: Chapel
- Year consecrated: 1788

Location
- Location: Santiago de Compostela, Galicia, Spain
- Interactive map of Capela de Ánimas

Architecture
- Architect: Miguel Ferro Caaveiro
- Style: Neoclassical

The Capela de Ánimas (literally "Chapel of Souls") is a Neoclassical chapel in Santiago de Compostela, Galicia, Spain. Construction began in April 1784 under the direction of architect Miguel Ferro Caaveiro, and was consecrated in 1788. However, the façade was not completed until the turn of the century.

== Description ==
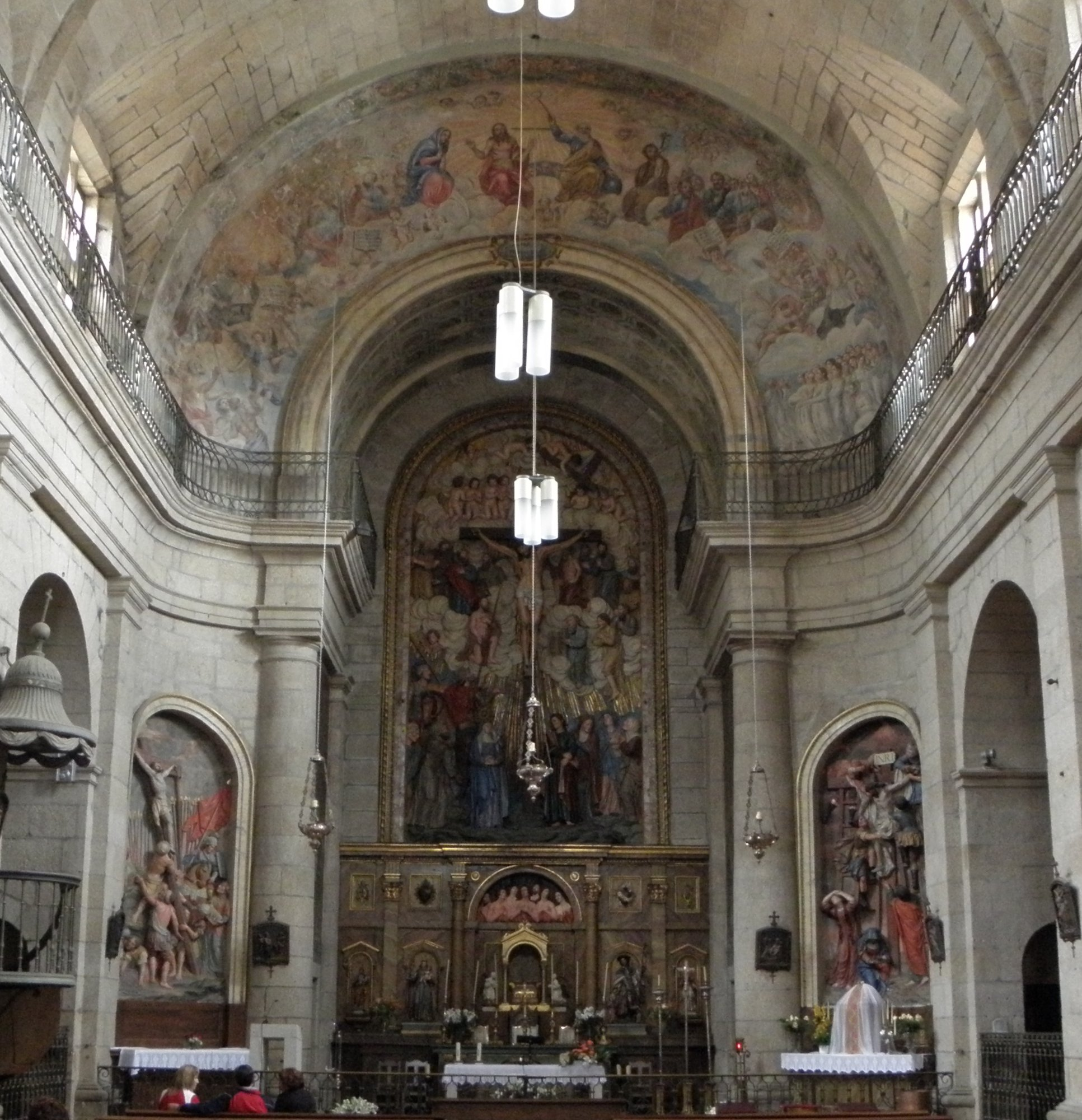
Interior of the church

For the construction of the building, the Brotherhood of Ánimas submitted several designs to the San Fernando Academy of Fine Arts, to be reviewed by the architect Ventura Rodríguez. The chosen design was by Miguel Ferro Caaveiro.

=== Interior ===
It has a single nave covered with a barrel vault, and three side chapels on each side, joined together and decorated with painted bas-reliefs showing scenes from the Passion of Christ (including the Way of Sorrows): from the Flagellation of Christ, the crucifixion to the resurrection of Jesus.

The chancel, narrower than the nave, is connected to it through a concave arch, a feature typical of Spanish Baroque Classicism from the reign of Charles III. An example of this type of arch can be found in the chapel of the Royal Palace in Madrid.

=== Exterior ===
The façade was built at the turn of the century, when the brotherhood was able to purchase and demolish a block of houses that had been obstructing the development and view of the front of the building.

The frontispiece is framed by two pairs of big columns with plain shafts and Ionic style capitals, standing on high pedestals. They support a flat entablature topped with a straight pediment. The pediment is topped with two angels adoring the Cross. Over the door, there is a relief depicting nine people burning, in reference to the Souls of Purgatory.
