= Jean-François de Neufforge =

- Born: 1 April 1714; Comblain-au-Pont
- Died: 19 December 1791 (aged 77); Paris
- Occupations: Architect, engraver
- Known for: Recueil elementaire d'architecture

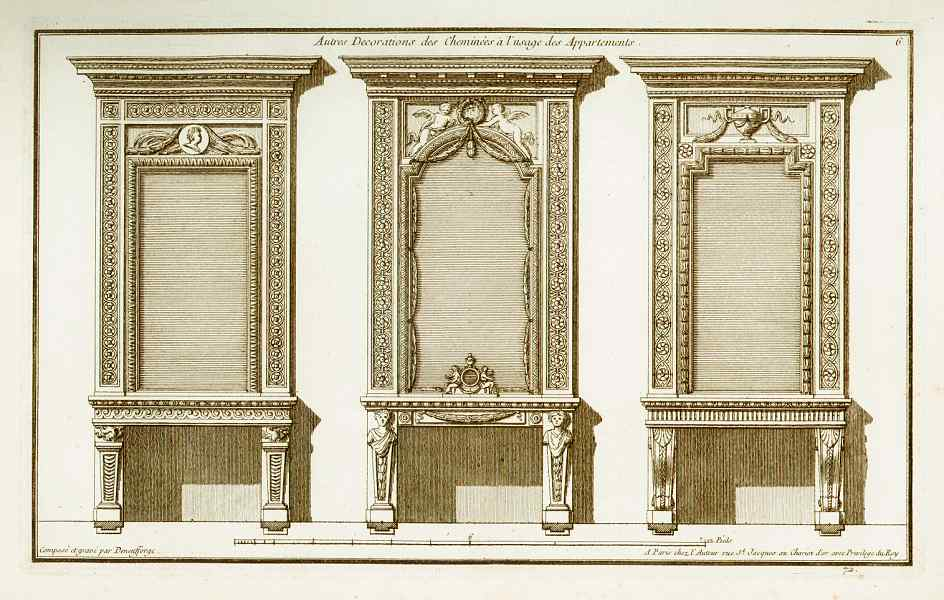
Fireplace decorations for apartments

Jean-François de Neufforge (1 April 1714 – 19 December 1791) was an architect and engraver, known for his Recueil elementaire d'architecture, a book of architectural engravings. He was born in the Holy Roman Empire.

== Biography ==
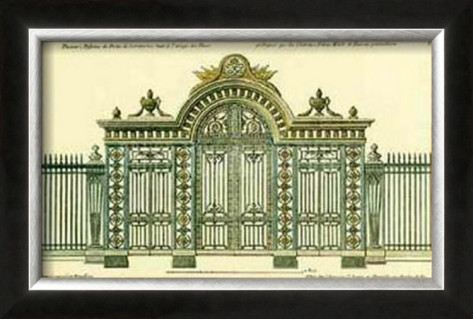
Palace gate

Jean-François de Neufforge was born on 1 April 1714 in Comblain-au-Pont, close to Liege. Descendant of a very old family that possessed significant fiefs, he came from a distant and less wealthy junior branch. He had one brother and one sister. He moved to Paris around 1738. He studied engraving under Pierre Edmé Babel and architecture under Jacques-François Blondel. He contributed nineteen engravings to David Le Roy's book The Ruins of the Most Beautiful Monuments of Greece.

It was not until 1755 that he began to become known. At that time he launched on the project that would occupy the rest of his life, the eight folio volumes of the Recueil élémentaire d'architecture... His planned work was presented to the Academy of Architecture, which approved it on 5 September 1757, and on 27 November 1757 an advertisement appeared in the Année littéraire announcing the work, which had 96 plates, for use by artists, amateurs and students. Almost all the illustrations were his own work, an immense undertaking. The Academy encouraged Neufforge with another endorsement in 1758.

In February 1762 four volumes divided into 48 six-page sections appeared, soon followed by the fifth volume. The work was well-received, and was followed by additional volumes in subsequent years. Eventually the full set, published in Paris between 1757 and 1780, contained 900 engravings of aspects of eighteenth-century architecture, most of which he designed and engraved himself. The engravings cover the full range of buildings of his day and included facades, floor plans, doors, columns, vases, stairways, fireplaces and fences. The book was widely used by architects in the 1700s.

Jean-François de Neufforge died in Paris on 19 December 1791. He had married twice, and left one son, Joseph de Neufforge, born in 1768.

== Style ==
Neufforge's designs were intended for a wide range of people, from the middle class to the extremely wealthy. Most of his work was in the Rococo style. His work on the engravings for Le Roy's Les Ruines des plus beaux monuments de la Grèce brought him into contact with Jean-François Le Lorrain, whose influence shows in the earlier volumes of the Recueil elementaire which included all the elements of the Greek revival style. His later work, however, banished these influences and showed that Neufforge had adopted the views of Marie-Joseph Peyre and Andrea Palladio. The later designs, with cubic houses, flat undecorated exterior walls, prostyle porticos and other elements gave clear evidence of borrowings from English Palladianism.

His work was highly geometrical. Thus a design that he made of a temple exactly matched tiling designed by Kepler. Even his designs for small bourgeois gardens were elegant and geometrical. Neufforge was not interested in the practicality of his designs, but mainly concerned with style and appearance. The Journal de Trévoux announced the fifth volume in February 1762, describing the work as being in good taste with mature composition, invention subordinated to the rules, avoiding frivolous, bizarre or singular elements.

== Gallery ==
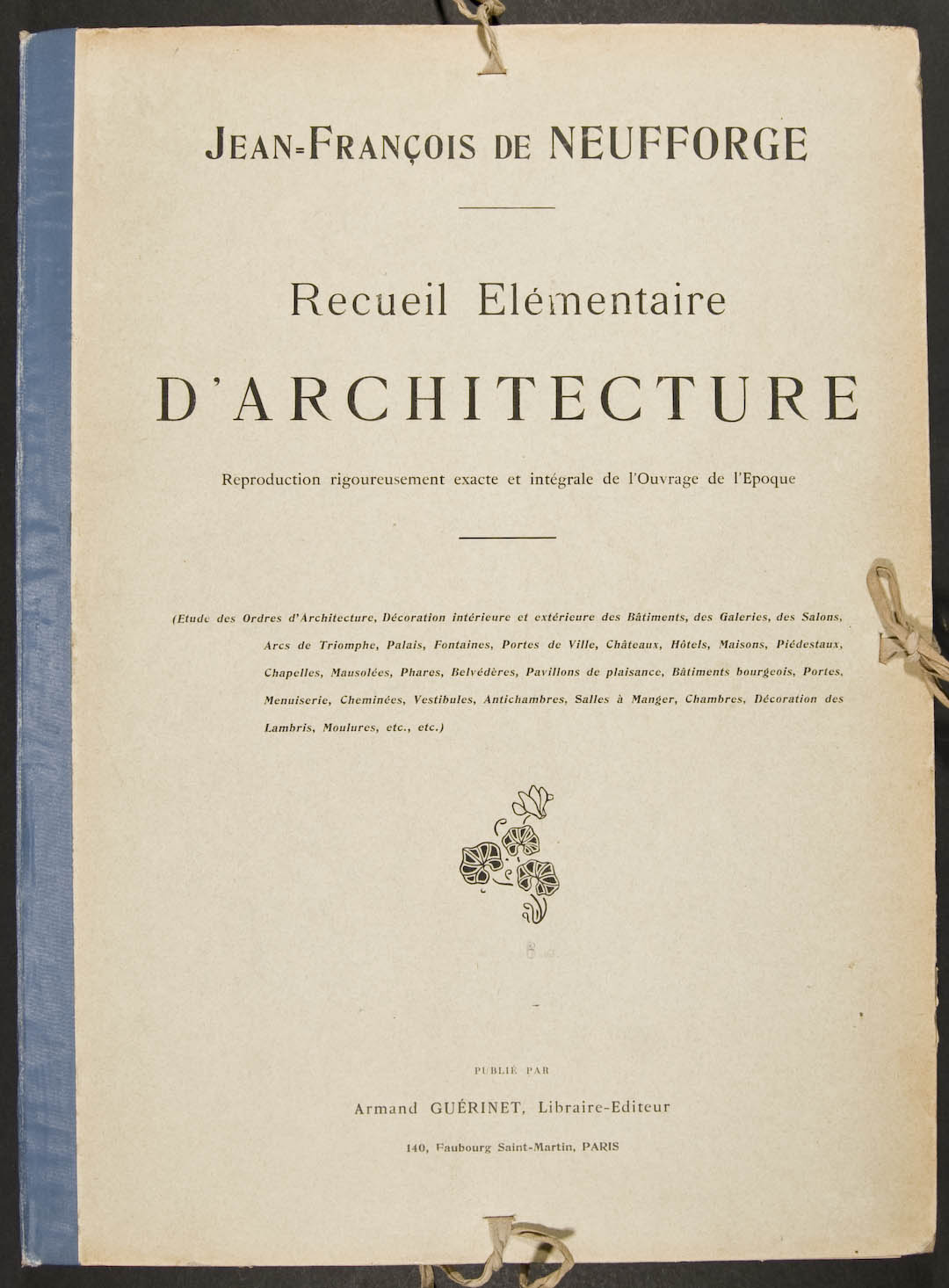
Front page of the Recueil elementaire d'architecture

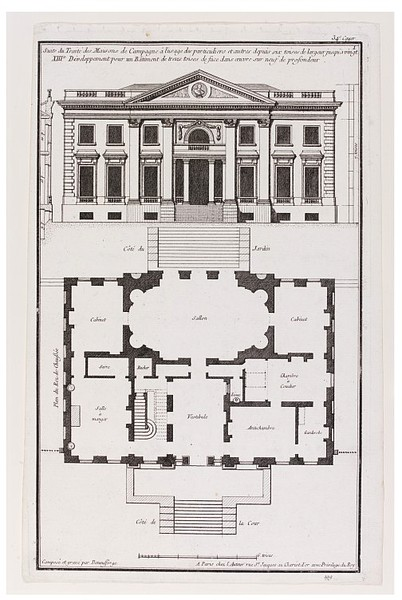
Facade and floor plan

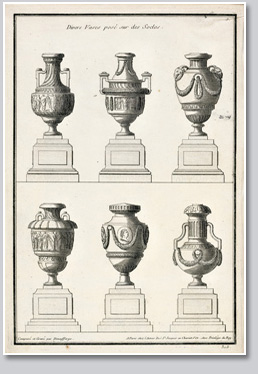
Various vases on pedestals

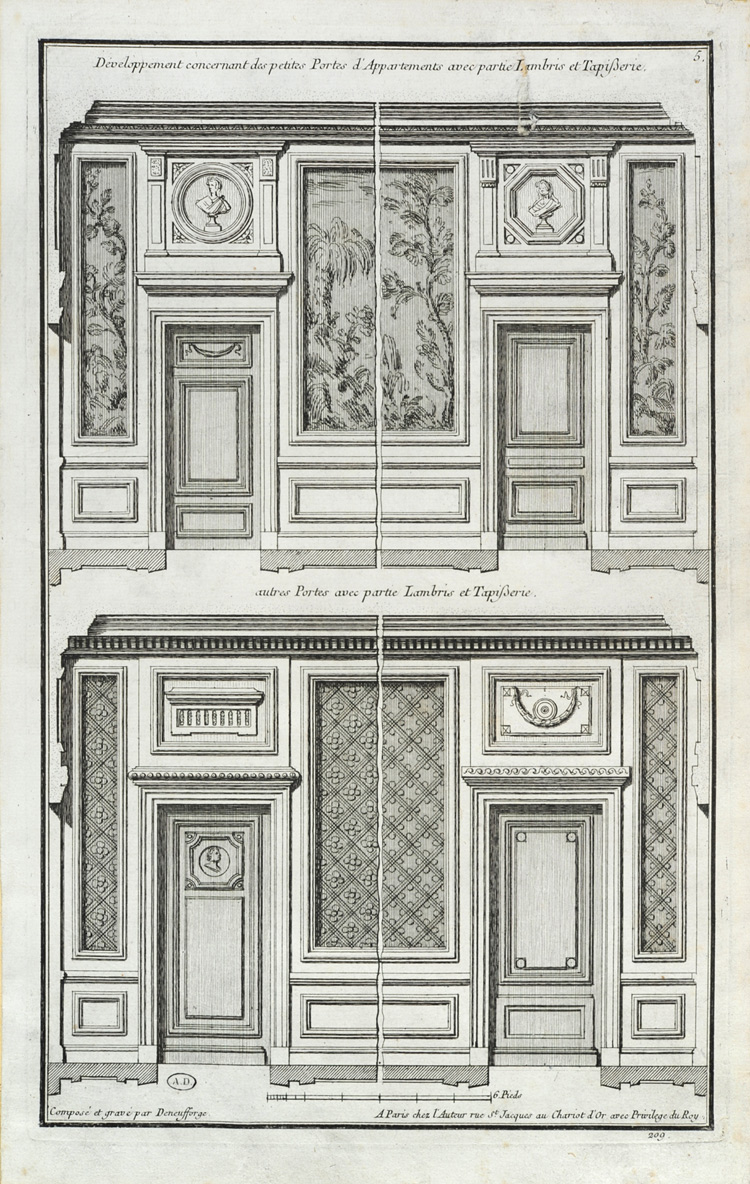
Small apartment doors

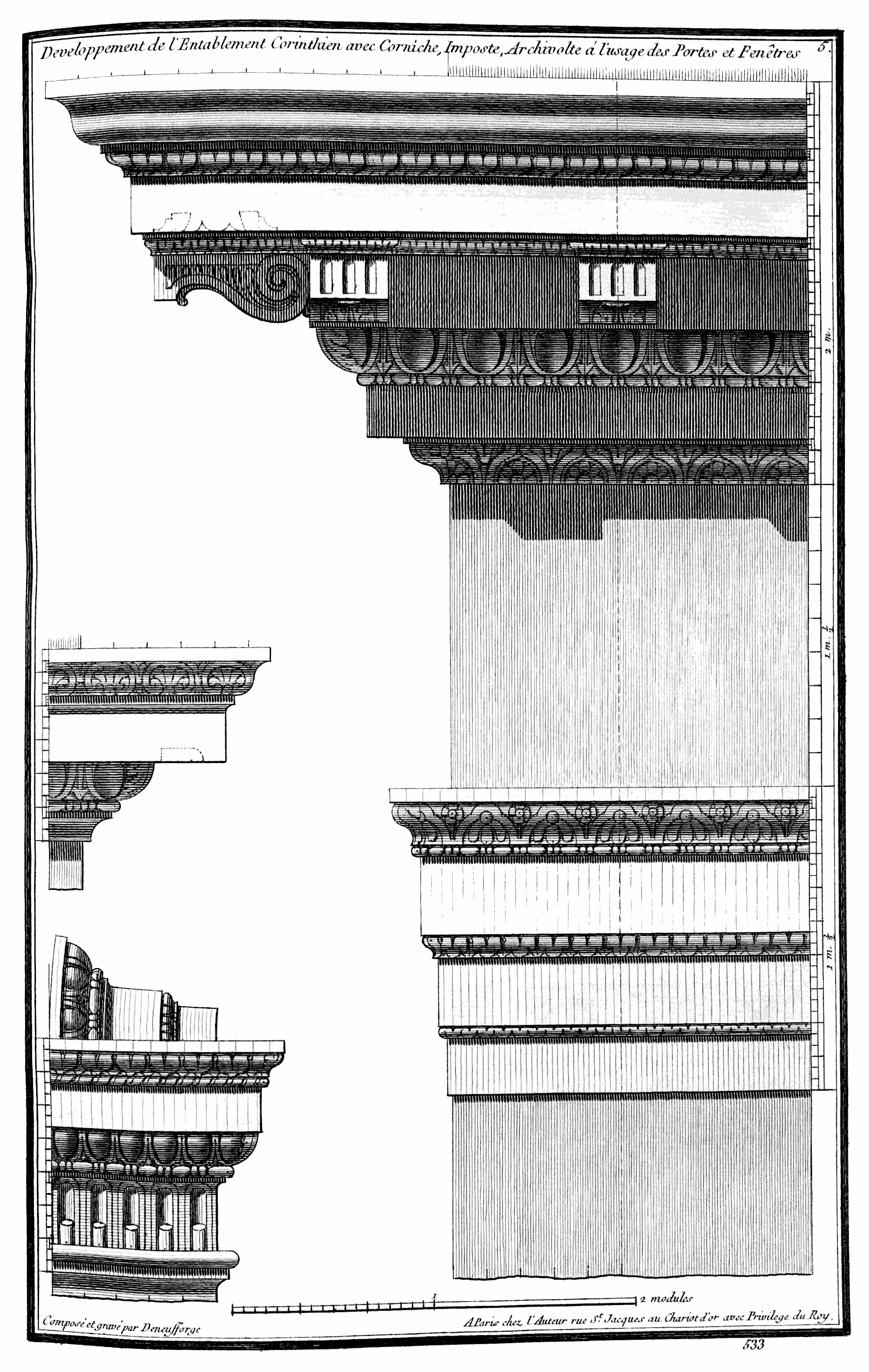
Head of a Corinthian column

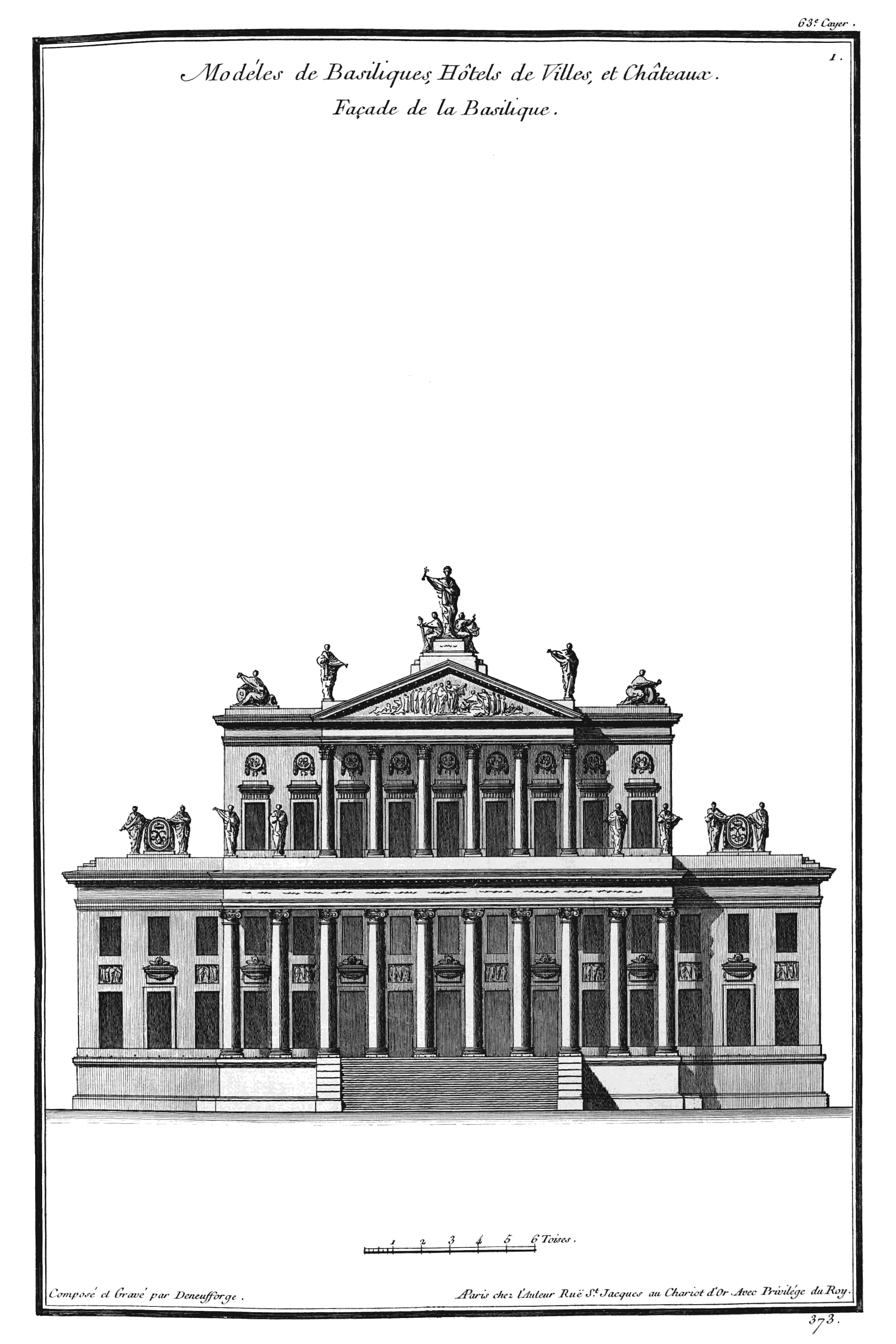
Basilica Elevation & Plan

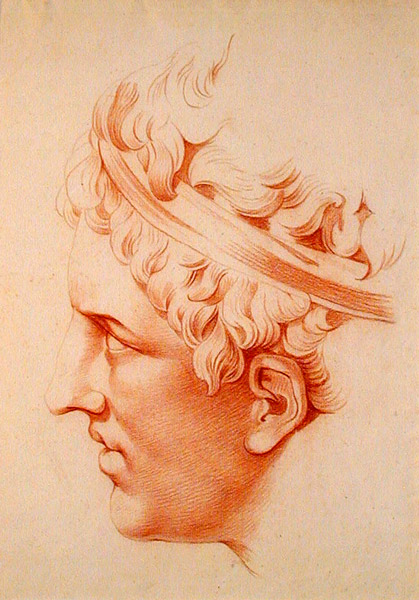
Head of a young man à l'antique

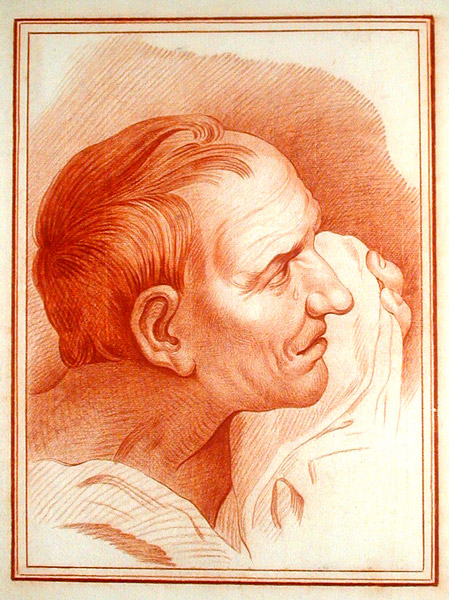
Classically attired man weeping

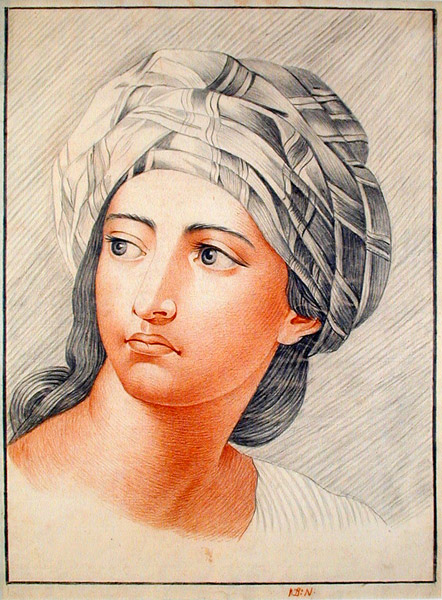
Moor with turban

== Bibliography ==
- Recueil élémentaire d’architecture contenant plusieurs études des ordres d’architecture d’après l’opinion des Anciens et le sentiment des Modernes, différents entrecolonnements propres à l’ordonnance des façades, divers exemples de décorations extérieures et intérieures à l’usage des monuments sacrés, publics et particuliers, composé par le sieur Neufforge, architecte.
  Volume I ― Volume II, 1757 ; 1758. Read in line.
- Recueil élémentaire d’architecture contenant des distributions de bâtiments bourgeois, depuis deux toises de face jusqu’à 24, modèles de bâtiments à l’usage de toutes sortes de personnes, tant pour la ville que pour la campagne, depuis 3 toises de face jusqu’à 50, des portes, des croisées, des niches, de la menuiserie et ornements à l’usage de bâtiments sacrés, publics et particuliers, composé par le sieur Neufforge, architecte.
  Volume III ― Volume IV, 1760 ; 1761. Read in line.
- Recueil élémentaire d’architecture qui présente des cheminées, plafonds, bordures, commodes, tables, poëles, balustres, guéridons, piédouches, gaines et vases, diverses portes de cour et de places, ponts triomphaux, aqueducs, grottes, orangeries, fontaines jaillissantes, treillages, de la serrurerie, des jardins à l’usage de toutes sortes de personnes, modèles d’édifices publics et sacrés, d’autels et baldaquins, de chapelles, de tombeaux, de chaires à prêcher, de confessionnaux, de buffets d’orgue, de lambris et stalles de chœur &c., composé par le sieur Neufforge, architecte.
  Volume V ― Volume VI, 1763 ; 1765. Read in line.
- Recueil élémentaire d’architecture qui représente divers exemples d’églises et chapelles, des grands bâtiments depuis 12 toises de face jusqu’à 120, plusieurs décorations d’appartements et salles de spectacles, modèles de différents développements dans leurs proportions avec des profils en grand sur toutes les parties et détails qui renferment la décoration tant des façades que des appartements, meubles et autres sujets concernant l’appareil, pavés de marbre, assemblage de charpentes, &c., des portiques, berceaux et palissades de verdure à l’usage des jardins, composé par le sieur Neufforge, architecte.
  Volume VII ― Volume VIII, 1767 ; 1768. Read in line.
- Supplément au Recueil élémentaire d’architecture contenant plusieurs études des ordres d’architecture d’après l’opinion des Anciens et le sentiment des Modernes, divers entrecolonnements propres à l’ordonnance des façades, divers exemples de décorations extérieures et intérieures, &c., à l’usage des monuments sacrés, publics et particuliers, composé par le sieur Neufforge, architecte.
  Volume 1, 1772-1775. Read in line.
- Supplément au Recueil élémentaire d’architecture contenant plusieurs études des ordres d’architecture d’après l’opinion des Anciens et le sentiment des Modernes, divers entrecolonnements propres à l’ordonnance des façades, divers exemples de décorations extérieures et intérieures, &c., à l’usage des monuments sacrés, publics et particuliers, composé par le sieur Neufforge, architecte.
  Volume 2, 1775-1780. Read in line.
- Autels et baldaquins: recueil factice.
  circa 1747-1767. Read in line.
