= José Iglesias de la Casa =

Spanish priest & poet (1748–1791)

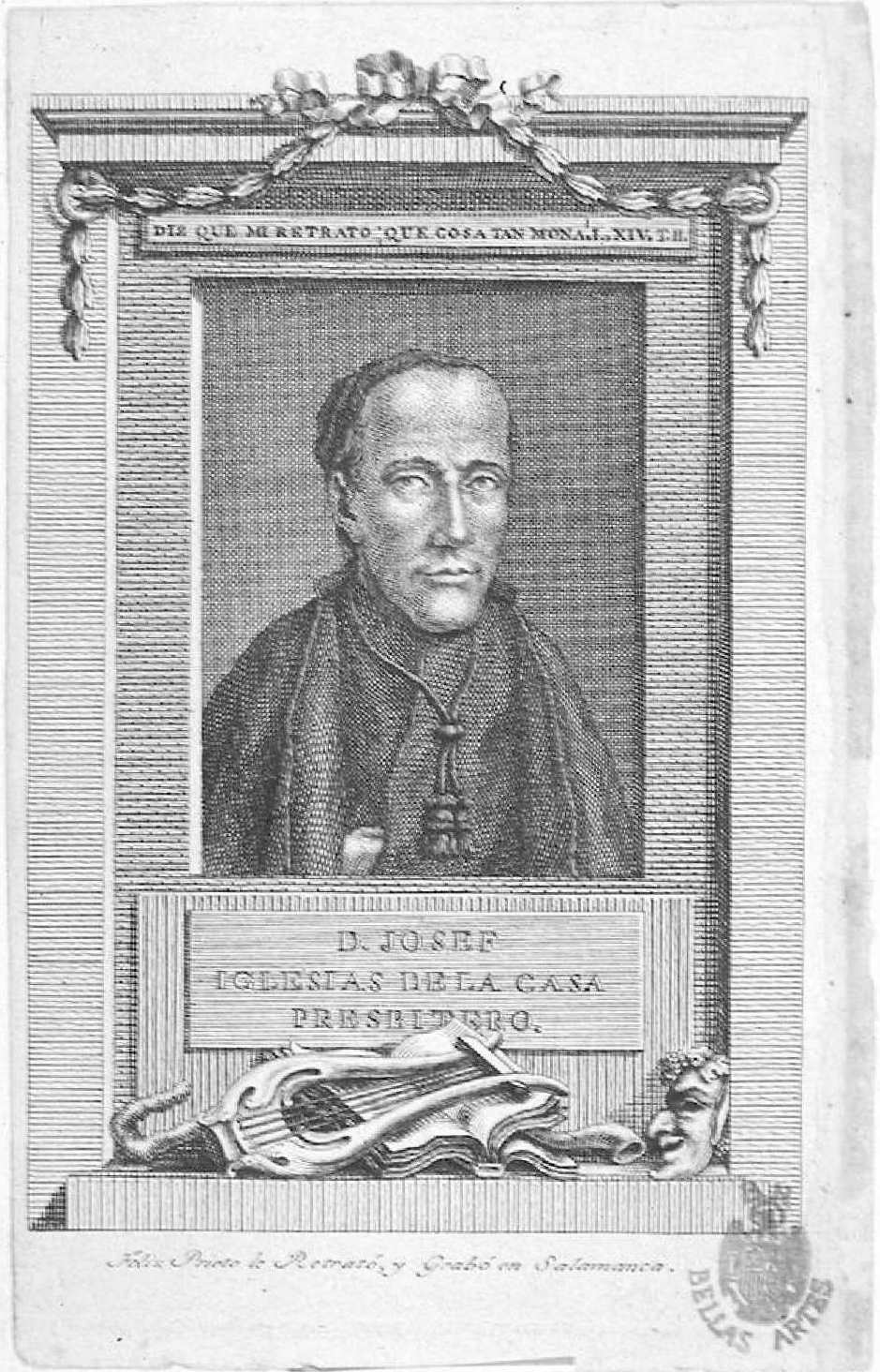
José Iglesias de la Casa, signed engraving: «Félix Prieto le Retrató y Grabó en Salamanca», 1798. Biblioteca Nacional de España.

José Iglesias de la Casa (31 October 1748, Salamanca – 26 August 1791, Carbajosa de la Sagrada) was a Spanish priest and poet. De la Casa pursued his studies at the University of Salamanca and in 1784 took holy orders in Madrid, Spain.

== Biography ==
De la Casa was known as a popular satirist in the style of Francisco de Quevedo. During his lifetime, de la Casa published comedic poems, such as "La Teclogia" ("The Technology") and "La niñez Laureada" ("Laureada's Childhood"), which told of an infant prodigy who at the age of four underwent a university examination.

Certain portions of his work provided offense to the Church authorities and were put on the index of forbidden books by the Inquisition. Among the better-known editions of his works are those of Barcelona (1820 and 1837), of Paris (1821), and of Madrid (1841). They are most readily accessible in the "Biblioteca de Autores Españoles", vol. LXI, which contains about 38 letrillas, satires, epigrams, odes, anacreontics, and eclogues. A collection of his unedited poems were published by R. Foulche-Delbosc, in the 1895 "Revue Hispanique", vol. II.
