= Sinitta discography =

- Studio albums: 3
- Compilation albums: 5
- Singles: 28
- Music videos: 17

The following is a discography of singles and albums released by British singer Sinitta.

== Albums ==
=== Studio albums ===
Year	Album	Peak chart positions			Certifications (sales thresholds)
Year	Album	UK	AUS	NZ	Certifications (sales thresholds)
1987	Sinitta!: Released: 14 December 1987; Label: Fanfare Records	34	69	38	BPI: Gold
1989	Wicked: Released: 27 November 1989; Label: Fanfare Records	52	136	—	BPI: Gold
1995	Naughty Naughty: Released: 1995; Label: different in each territory	—	—	—	
"—" denotes releases that did not chart or were not released in that territory.

=== Compilation albums ===
- 1998: The Best of Sinitta (Pegasus) (Note: Contains new re-recorded tracks.)
- 1999: The Very Best of...Sinitta/Toy Boy (Pegasus)
- 2009: The Hits+ Collection 86–09: Right Back Where We Started From (Cherry Pop/PMG Music/Sony Music)
- 2010: Greatest Hits + Bonus DVD (Cherry Pop/Sony Music)

== Singles ==
=== As lead artist ===
Year	Title	Peak chart positions										Certifications (sales thresholds)	Album
Year	Title	UK	AUS	GER	IRE	NL	NZ	SWE	SWI	US	US Dance	Certifications (sales thresholds)	Album
1983	"I Could Be"	192	—	—	—	—	—	—	—	—	—		Non-album single
1983	"Never Too Late"	119	—	—	—	—	—	—	—	—	—		Non-album single
1984	"Cruising"	112	—	—	—	—	—	—	—	—	—		Sinitta!
1985	"So Macho"	2	14	—	—	36	45	13	—	—	—	BPI: Gold	Sinitta!
1986	"Feels Like the First Time"	45	—	—	—	—	—	—	—	—	4		Sinitta!
1987	"Toy Boy"	4	49	9	11	23	13	13	3	—	19	BPI: Silver	Sinitta!
1987	"GTO"	15	62	31	13	42	37	—	11	—	—		Sinitta!
1988	"Cross My Broken Heart"	6	56	18	7	44	39	—	19	—	26	BPI: Silver	Sinitta!
1988	"I Don't Believe in Miracles"	22	—	—	21	—	—	—	—	—	—		Wicked
1989	"Right Back Where We Started From"	4	7	25	5	48	2	—	—	84	—	BPI: Silver; ARIA: Gold	Wicked
1989	"Love on a Mountain Top"	20	81	—	18	—	—	—	—	—	—		Wicked
1989	"Lay Me Down Easy"	88	—	—	—	—	—	—	—	—	—		Wicked
1990	"Hitchin' a Ride"	24	131	—	19	—	—	—	—	—	—		Wicked
1990	"Love and Affection"	62	—	—	—	—	—	—	—	—	—		Non-album single
1992	"Shame Shame Shame"	28	135	—	30	—	—	—	—	—	—		Naughty Naughty
1993	The Supreme EP (Note: The four tracks on The Supreme EP are "Where Did Our Love Go", "Stop in the Name of Love", "You Can't Hurry Love" and "Remember Me".)	49	—	—	—	—	—	—	—	—	—		Naughty Naughty
1993	"Aquarius"	82	—	—	—	—	—	—	—	—	—		Non-album single
2014	"So Many Men So Little Time"	—	—	—	—	—	—	—	—	—	—		Non-album single
2015	"Touch Me (All Night Long)"	—	—	—	—	—	—	—	—	—	—		Non-album single
2016	"Girlfriend"	—	—	—	—	—	—	—	—	—	—		Non-album single
2018	"Shine with Pride"	—	—	—	—	—	—	—	—	—	—		Non-album single
2020	"Paradise"	—	—	—	—	—	—	—	—	—	—		Non-album single
2021	"Can You Feel It" (with Junior and Kym Mazelle)	—	—	—	—	—	—	—	—	—	—		Non-album single
2021	"I Won't Be Lonely This Christmas"	—	—	—	—	—	—	—	—	—	—		Non-album single
"—" denotes releases that did not chart or were not released in that territory.

=== Collaborations ===
- 1983: "Break Me Into Little Pieces" (with Hot Gossip)
- 1983: "Don't Beat Around the Bush" (with Hot Gossip)
- 1986: "Give Give Give" (with Dance Aid) – UK No. 85, BEL (Fla) No. 33
- 1988: "A Place in the Sun" (with Winjama)
- 1990: "Bridge Over Troubled Water" (with The Session)
- 1997: "You Can Do Magic" (credited as The Mojams featuring Debbie Currie; but using Sinitta's vocals)
