= The Hits+ Collection 86–09: Right Back Where We Started From =

The Hits+ Collection 86–09

Greatest hits album by Sinitta
- Released: 19 October 2009
- Recorded: 1986–2009
- Genre: Dance-pop; Hi-NRG
- Label: Cherry Pop; Sony Music; Prolific Media Group UK

Sinitta chronology
Naughty Naughty (1995)	The Hits+ Collection 86–09 (2009)	The Greatest Hits (2010)

The Hits+ Collection 86–09: Right Back Where We Started From is a greatest hits album by British singer Sinitta, released on 19 October 2009.

== Track listing ==
Disc 1
No.	Title	Writer(s)	Length
1.	"So Macho"	James George Hargreaves	3:25
2.	"Feels Like The First Time"	Hargreaves	3:50
3.	"Toy Boy"	Stock Aitken Waterman	3:29
4.	"G.T.O."	Stock Aitken Waterman	3:32
5.	"Cross My Broken Heart"	Stock Aitken Waterman	3:44
6.	"I Don't Believe in Miracles"	Stock Aitken Waterman	3:28
7.	"Right Back Where We Started From"	J. Vincent Edwards; Pierre Tubbs	3:15
8.	"Love on a Mountain Top"	Buzz Cason; Mac Gayden	3:27
9.	"Lay Me Down Easy"	Ralf René Maué	3:43
10.	"Hitchin' a Ride"	Mitch Murray; Peter Callander	3:42
11.	"Love and Affection"	Joan Armatrading	4:10
12.	"Shame Shame Shame"	Sylvia Robinson	3:05
13.	"Where Did Our Love Go"	Holland–Dozier–Holland	3:05
14.	"How Can This Be Real Love" (7″ mix (Note: Previously unreleased; recorded in 1988.))	Stock Aitken Waterman	3:27
15.	"Do You Wanna Find Out" (12″ mix)	Stock Aitken Waterman	5:57
16.	"Hitchin' a Ride" (PWL 7″ mix (Note: Previously unreleased.))	Murray; Callander	3:36
17.	"Body Shopping" (Pete Hammond Hi-NRG remix)	Sinitta; Phil Harding; Ian Curnow	3:34
18.	"I Don't Believe in Miracles" (Merlin's New Hit mix)	Stock Aitken Waterman	3:44
19.	"Shame Shame Shame" (alternative 12″ mix)	Robinson	5:52
20.	"The Day You Said Goodbye (Note: New recording from 2007.)"	Nathan Thomas; Carl Cox	3:49
21.	"Toy Boy" (reloaded)	Stock Aitken Waterman	3:39
Total length:			1:19:33

Disc 2
No.	Title	Writer(s)	Length
1.	"Toy Boy" (the original mix)	Stock Aitken Waterman	6:33
2.	"G.T.O." (Modina's Red Roaring Mix)	Stock Aitken Waterman	7:31
3.	"Cross My Broken Heart" (12″ Euro remix)	Stock Aitken Waterman	6:24
4.	"I Don't Believe in Miracles" (club remix)	Stock Aitken Waterman	5:56
5.	"Right Back Where We Started From" (Left Back on the Side mix)	Edwards; Tubbs	7:17
6.	"Love on a Mountain Top" (promo 12″ mix)	Cason; Gayden	7:49
7.	"Hitchin' a Ride" (PWL remix)	Murray; Callander	6:43
8.	"How Can This Be Real Love" (12″ mix)	Stock Aitken Waterman	5:21
9.	"Body Shopping" (original 12″ mix)	Sinitta; Harding; Curnow	6:22
10.	"I Just Wanna Spend Some Time with You" (12″ mix)	Pete Hammond	6:46
11.	"You Keep Me Hanging On" (12″ mix)	Sinitta; Harding; Curnow	5:40
12.	"The Day You Said Goodbye" (Pete Hammond's Empire Strikes Back mix)	Thomas; Cox	7:34
Total length:			1:19:56

== Release history ==
Region	Date	Label	Format(s)	Catalog
United Kingdom & Ireland	19 October 2009	Cherry Pop	CD	CRPOPD28
United Kingdom & Ireland	19 October 2009	Sony Music Entertainment	Digital download	
