= Barry Grint =

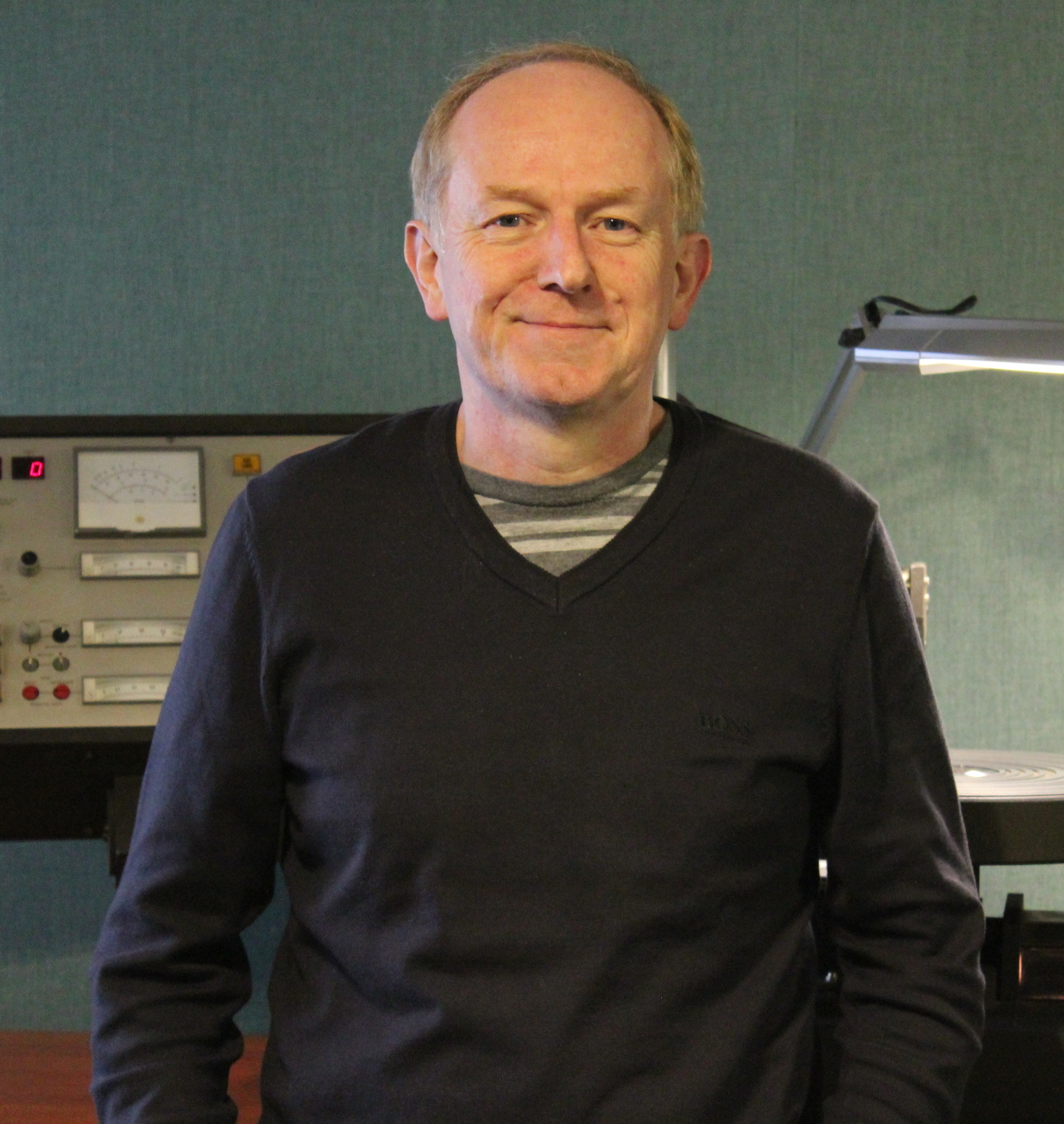

Background information
- Also known as: Bazza
- Born: Barry Stephen Grint; April 1959 (age 67)
- Genres: Rock; pop; contemporary R&B; electronica; classical; reggae; folk
- Occupation: Mastering engineer
- Years active: 1984–present
- Labels: Sony, Warner Bros., Mute, Universal

Barry Stephen Grint (born April 1959) is an English mastering engineer and member of the mastering group of the Music Producers Guild (MPG). Grint has worked on over 20 UK Number One records and more than 100 UK Top Ten hits. Projects for artists include: Madonna, Prince, Puff Daddy, Eric Clapton, David Bowie, The Beatles, Oasis, Keane, Beach Boys, Jessie J, Rod Stewart, Paul Simon, Van Halen, Michael McDonald and A-ha.

He began cutting records at Trident Studios in 1984 mastering international tracks for the UK and Europe. He identified his work by etching Bazza in the run out groove and of the years various incarnations have included Bazza @ Audio One, Bazza @ Tape One, Bazza @ Porky's, Bazza @ Abbey Road and Bazza @ Alchemy. He is now mastering and cutting vinyl at Alchemy's studios in Brook Green, London.

Representing the Music Producers Guild, Grint worked with the European Broadcasting Union (EBU) to create a standard for embedding the International Standard Recording Code (ISRC) within a Broadcast Wave Format (BWF). This has been adopted by the main manufacturers of mastering software internationally and is supported by The International Federation of the Phonographic Industry (IFPI), the British Phonographic Industry (BPI) and the Association of Independent Music (AIM).

== Selected discography ==
=== 1980s ===
- 1984: Alphaville;- Big In Japan
- 1984: Boothill Foot-tappers- Get Your Feet Out Of My Shoes
- 1984: Break Machine;- Street Dance
- 1984: Break Machine;- Breakdance Party
- 1984: Chicago;- Hard Habit to Break
- 1984: Duran Duran;- The Wild Boys
- 1984: Foreigner;- I Want To Know What Love Is
- 1984: Madonna;- Like a Virgin
- 1984: Van Halen;- Jump
- 1984: ZZ Top;- Gimme All Your Lovin'
- 1984: ZZ Top;- Sharp Dressed Man
- 1985: A-HA;- Take On Me
- 1985: A-HA;- The Sun Always Shines On TV
- 1985: Animotion;- Obsession
- 1985: Steve Arrington;- Feel So Real
- 1985: Steve Arrington;- Dancin' In The Key Of Life
- 1985: The Cars;- Drive
- 1985: Commodores;- Nightshift
- 1985: Duran Duran;- View To A Kill
- 1985: Sheila E;- The Belle Of St Mark
- 1985: Foreigner;- Cold As Ice (Rmx)
- 1985: Doug E. Fresh & The Get Fresh Crew;- The Show
- 1985: James Ingram;- Yah Mo Be There
- 1985: Kool And The Gang;- Cherish
- 1985: Huey Lewis And The News;- The Power Of Love
- 1985: Huey Lewis And The News;- Heart And Soul
- 1985: Michael McDonald;- Yah Mo Be There
- 1985: Madonna;- Material Girl
- 1985: Madonna;- Crazy For You
- 1985: Madonna;- Into the Groove
- 1985: Madonna;- Holiday
- 1985: Madonna;- Dress You Up
- 1985: John Parr;- St Elmo's Fire
- 1985: Prince;- 1999/Little Red Corvette
- 1985: Prince;- Raspberry Beret
- 1985: Simply Red;- Holding Back The Years
- 1985: Sister Sledge;- Frankie
- 1985: ZZ Top;- Legs
- 1986: A-HA;- Train Of Thought
- 1986: A-HA;- Hunting High And Low
- 1986: A-HA;- Cry Wolf
- 1986: Bon Jovi;- You Give Love A Bad Name
- 1986: Bon Jovi;- Livin' On A Prayer
- 1986: Cameo;- Word Up
- 1986: Peter Cetera;- Glory Of Love
- 1986: Europe;- The Final Countdown
- 1986: Farley "Jackmaster" Funk;- Love Can't Turn Around
- 1986: Hollywood Beyond;-
- 1986: Hollywood Beyond;- No More Tears
- 1986: Anita Baker;- Sweet Love
- 1986: Bananarama;- Venus
- 1986: Huey Lewis And The News;- The Power Of Love / Do You Believe In Love
- 1986: Huey Lewis And The News;- The Heart Of Rock And Roll
- 1986: Huey Lewis And The News;- Stuck With You
- 1986: Huey Lewis And The News;- Hip To Be Square
- 1986: Michael McDonald;- On My Own
- 1986: Michael McDonald;- I keep Forgettin
- 1986: Michael McDonald;- Sweet Freedom
- 1986: Madonna;- Borderline
- 1986: Madonna;- Live To Tell
- 1986: Madonna;- Papa Don't Preach
- 1986: Madonna;- True Blue
- 1986: Madonna;- Open Your Heart
- 1986: Mel & Kim;- Showing Out (Get Fresh At The Weekend)
- 1986: Nu Shooz;- I Can't Wait
- 1986: Prince;- Kiss
- 1986: Stan Ridgway;- Camouflage
- 1986: Rochelle;- My Magic Man
- 1986: Paul Simon;- You Can Call Me Al
- 1986: Paul Simon;- Boy In The Bubble
- 1986: Frank Sinatra;- New York, New York
- 1986: Candi Staton;- Young Hearts Run Free
- 1986: Status Quo; In The Army Now
- 1986: Rod Stewart;- Every Beat Of My Heart
- 1986: Rod Stewart;- Another Heartache
- 1986: Swing Out Sister;- Break Out
- 1986: Prince;- Mountains
- 1986: Eric Clapton/Tina Turner;- Tearing Us Apart
- 1987: A-HA;- The Living Daylights
- 1987: Atlantic Starr;- Always
- 1987: Beastie Boys;- Girls/She's Crafty
- 1987: Bee Gees;- You Win Again
- 1987: Eric Clapton;- Behind The Mask
- 1987: Doobie Brothers;- What A Fool Believes
- 1987: David Essex;- Myfanwy
- 1987: John Farnham;- You're The Voice
- 1987: Karel Fialka;- Hey Matthew
- 1987: The Firm;- Star Trekkin'
- 1987: Fleetwood Mac;- Big Love
- 1987: Freeez;- Southern Freeze (Rmx)
- 1987: Georgia Satellites;- Battleship Chains
- 1987: Glenn & Chris;- Diamond Lights
- 1987: Steve 'Silk' Hurley;- Jack Your Body
- 1987: Anita Baker;- Caught Up In The rapture
- 1987: Ben E. King;- Stand By Me
- 1987: Michael McDonald;- What A Fool Believes
- 1987: Madonna;- La Isla Bonita
- 1987: Mel & Kim;- Respectable
- 1987: Mel & Kim;- F.L.M.
- 1987: Nitro Deluxe;- This Brutal House (Rmx)
- 1987: Prince;- Sign O' The Times
- 1987: Prince;- If I Was Your Girlfriend
- 1987: Prince;- U Got The Look
- 1987: R.E.M;- The One I Love
- 1987: Cliff Richard;- Some People
- 1987: Sinitta;- Toy Boy
- 1987: Sinitta;- G.T.O.
- 1987: Rod Stewart;- Sailing
- 1987: Stock Aitken Waterman;- Roadblock
- 1987: Timbuk 3;- The Future's So Bright, I Gotta Wear Shades
- 1987: Sal Solo;- Adoramous Te
- 1987: Full Force;- Love Is For Suckers
- 1987: The Alarm;- Presence Of Love
- 1988: A-HA;- Touchy
- 1988: Beach Boys;- Kokomo
- 1988: Beatmasters;- Rok da House
- 1988: Bomb The Bass;- Beat Dis
- 1988: Cookie Crew;- Rok da House
- 1988: Guns N' Roses;- Sweet Child O' Mine
- 1988: Simon Harris;- Bass (How Low Can You Go)
- 1988: Heart;- Never / These Dreams
- 1988: Derek B;- GoodGroove
- 1988: Derek B;- Bad Young Brother
- 1988: Derek B;- We've Got The Juice
- 1988: INXS;- Never Tear Us Apart
- 1988: Glen Medeiros;- Nothing's Gonna Change My Love For You
- 1988: Milli Vanilli;- Girl You Know It's True
- 1988: Milli Vanilli;- Baby Don't Forget My Number
- 1988: Vanessa Paradis;- Joe le taxi
- 1988: Michelle Shocked;- Anchorage
- 1988: Sinitta;- Cross My Broken Heart
- 1988: Yello;- The Race
- 1988: Captain Sensible;- Savage Amusement
- 1988: Siouxsie & The Banshees;- The Killing Jar
- 1988: Siouxsie & The Banshees;- Peek A Boo
- 1989: Double Trouble;- Just Keep Rockin
- 1989: Double Trouble;- Street Tuff
- 1989: A Guy Called Gerald;- Voodoo Ray
- 1989: Debbie Harry;- I Want That Man
- 1989: Chaka Khan;- I Feel For You (Rmx)
- 1989: Tone Loc;- Wild Thing
- 1989: Tone Loc;- Funky Cold Medina
- 1989: Mike + The Mechanics;- The Living Years
- 1989: Milli Vanilli;- Girl I'm Gonna Miss You
- 1989: Pat & Mick;- I Haven't Stopped Dancing Yet
- 1989: Paul Simpson;- Musical Freedom (Movin' On Up)
- 1989: Sinitta;- Right Back Where We Started From
- 1989: Sinitta;- Love On A Mountain Top
- 1989: Steeleye Span;- Following Me
- 1989: Black Sabbath;- Devil & Daughter
- 1989: Toni Halliday;- Weekday

=== 1990s ===
- 1990 Beats International;- Dub Be Good To Me
- 1990 The Farm;- All Together Now
- 1990 Guru Josh;- Infinity
- 1990 Roxette;- Dressed For Success
- 1990 Sinitta;- Hitchin' A Ride
- 1990 Sinitta;- Love And Affection
- 1991 Marc Cohn;- Walking In Memphis
- 1991 Chris Isaak;- Blue Hotel
- 1991 Alison Limerick;- Where Love Lives
- 1991 Brian May;- Driven By You
- 1991 Robert Palmer;- Mercy Mercy Me
- 1991 PM Dawn;- Set Adrift On Memory Bliss
- 1991 The Shamen;- Move Any Mountain
- 1991 Gary Numan;- Heart
- 1991 The Orb;- Perpetual Dawn
- 1991 Chic;- Le Freak
- 1992 Dr Alban;- It's My Life
- 1992 Shakespears Sister;- Stay
- 1992 Gary Numan;- Machine + Soul
- 1993 Kate Bush;- Rubberband Girl
- 1993 Chaka Demus & Pliers;- Tease Me
- 1993 Eternal;- Stay
- 1993 Tim Finn;- Hit The Ground Running
- 1993 4 Non Blondes;- What's Up
- 1993 Gloria Gaynor;- I Will Survive (Rmx)
- 1993 Slade;- Radio Wall Of Sound
- 1994 Ant & Dec;- Let's Get Ready To Rhumble
- 1994 Alicia Bridges;- I Love The Nightlife (Rmx)
- 1994 Phyllis Nelson;- Move Closer
- 1994 Oasis;- Whatever
- 1994 Reel 2 Real;- I Like To Move It
- 1995 Ant & Dec;- Our Radio Rocks
- 1995 Robson & Jerome;- Unchained Melody
- 1995 Robson & Jerome;- I Believe / Up On The Roof
- 1995 Oasis;- Some Might Say
- 1995 Oasis;- Roll With It
- 1996 Peter Andre;- Mysterious Girl
- 1996 Paul Carrack;- Eyes Of Blue
- 1996 Robert Miles;- Children
- 1997 David Arnold;- Diamonds Are Forever
- 1997 David Bowie;- Dead Man Walking
- 1997 Hanson;- MMMBop
- 1997 Natalie Imbruglia;- Torn
- 1997 Ce Ce Peniston;- Finally
- 1997 Detune;- Expression
- 1997 Puff Daddy & The Family;- Been Around The World
- 1998 BT;- Godspeed
- 1998 B*Witched;- C'est La Vie
- 1998 Digitalis;- The Third State
- 1999 BT;- Mercury And Solace
- 1999 Vengaboys;- We Like To Party
- 1999 Freq Nasty;- Underglass

=== 2000s ===
- 2000 BT;- Dreaming
- 2012 Keane;- The Starting Line
- 2013 Jessie J;- Do It Like A Dude (Acoustic)
- 2013 Wolf Alice;- Blush
- 2013 Erasure;- The Remixes
- 2013 Erasure;- Gaudete
- 2013 Backstreet Boys;- In A World Like This
- 2013 David Garret;- Bring Me To Life
- 2014 Nicole Scherzinger;- On The Rocks
- 2014 Nicole Scherzinger;- Run
- 2014 Everything Everything;- Arc
- 2014 The Vamps;- Cecilia
- 2014 Erasure;- Reason
- 2014 Erasure;- Be The One
- 2014 Goldfrapp;- Blood Diamonds
- 2014 Lindsay & Isaac;- Sad Song (Oasis Cover)
- 2014 Beats Dr Dre;- Turn
- 2014 Brad K;- The Risk
- 2015 Everything Everything;- Distant Past
- 2015 Amber Run;- I Found
- 2015 The Strypes;- Flat Out EP
- 2015 Slaves;- Cheer Up London
- 2015 Erasure;- Sacred
- 2015 Nothing But Thieves;- Itch
- 2015 AllTwins;- Thank You
- 2016 Tom Odell;- Wrong Crowd
- 2016 Radiohead;- "A Moon Shaped Pool"
- 2016 Shadows & Mirrors;- "ARIA"
- 2017 Bosum;- "Marvin"
- 2017 Winters Hill;- "
- 2017 Anomic Soul;- "AS1"
- 2017 Gorillaz;- "Demon Days"
