= Cruising (song) =

Single by Sinitta

from the album Sinitta!
- Released: 18 February 1984
- Recorded: 1984
- Genre: Synthpop, dance-pop, Hi-NRG
- Length: 3:52 (Single Version); 5:04 (Album Version)
- Label: Fanfare Records
- Songwriter: James George Hargreaves
- Producers: James George Hargreaves, Mick Parker

Sinitta singles chronology
"Never Too Late" (1983)	"Cruising" (1984)	"So Macho" (1985)

"Cruising" is a pop song by British singer Sinitta. The song was released in 1984 as the first single from Sinitta's debut album Sinitta! (1987). It was written by James George Hargreaves and produced by James George Hargreaves and Mick Parker. "Cruising" was re-recorded in 1999 and included on her compilation album The Very Best of...Sinitta. No music video was made for this song.

== Formats and track listings ==
7" Single

1. "Cruising" – 3:52
2. "Cruising" (Instrumental) – 3:35

12" Single

1. "Cruising" (Extended Version) – 5:52
2. "Cruising" (Dub Mix) – 4:20
