= I Could Be =

Single by Sinitta
- Released: 1983
- Recorded: 1983
- Genre: Synthpop, post-disco
- Length: 3:01
- Label: Midas Records Limited
- Songwriters: James George Hargreaves, A. Ajai-Ajagbe
- Producers: James George Hargreaves, A. Ajai-Ajagbe

Sinitta singles chronology
"Don't Beat Around the Bush" (1983)	"I Could Be" (1983)	"Never Too Late" (1983)

"I Could Be" is the first solo single by British singer Sinitta. The song was released in 1983 as a standalone single. The song was written and produced by James George Hargreaves and A. Ajai-Ajagbe. It was remixed by Haakon Brenner. No music video was made for this song.

It was added to the special edition of her debut album Sinitta! released in 2011.

== Formats and track listings ==
7" single

1. "I Could Be" – 3:01
2. "I Could Be" (instrumental) – 3:01

12" single

1. "I Could Be" (special U.S. extended mix) – 6:00
2. "I Could Be" – 3:01
3. "I Could Be" (instrumental) – 3:01
