= Eternal Love (PJ & Duncan song) =

Single by PJ & Duncan

from the album Psyche
- Released: November 21, 1994
- Recorded: 1994
- Genre: Pop
- Label: Telstar
- Songwriters: Nicky Graham; Denise P Lewis; Michael O. McCollin

PJ & Duncan singles chronology
"If I Give You My Number" (1994)	"Eternal Love" (1994)	"Our Radio Rocks" (1995)

Music video
- "Eternal Love" on YouTube

"Eternal Love" is a song by British television presenting duo PJ & Duncan, released in November 1994 by Telstar Records as the fifth single from their debut album, Psyche (1994). It was written by Nicky Graham, Denise P Lewis and Michael O. McCollin and reached number 12 on the UK Singles Chart. The single spent eight weeks in the top 40, with a total of nine weeks on the chart.

== Track listing ==
CD single (CDANT3)

No.	Title	Length
1.	"Eternal Love (100% Pure Love Remix)"
2.	"So Many Questions"
3.	"Exclusive: The PJ & Duncan Show - Part 5 ("Psyche" with backing track "So Many Questions")"
4.	"Eternal Love (Instrumental)"

CD single (CDDEC3)

No.	Title	Length
1.	"Eternal Love (100% Pure Love Remix)"
2.	"Eternal Love (Slow Groove Dance Mix)"
3.	"Let's Get Ready to Rhumble (Symon I Remix)"
4.	"Exclusive: The PJ & Duncan Show - Part 5 ("Psyche" with backing track "So Many Questions")"

== Charts ==
=== Weekly charts ===
Chart (1994)	Peak position
Israel (Israeli Singles Chart)	38
UK Singles (OCC)	12
UK Airplay (Music Week)	21

=== Year-end charts ===
Chart (1994)	Position
UK Singles (OCC)	94
