= Never Too Late (Sinitta song) =

Single by Sinitta
- Released: 1983
- Recorded: 1983
- Genre: Synthpop, funk, soul
- Length: 3:30
- Label: Midas Records Limited
- Songwriters: James George Hargreaves, A. Ajai-Ajagbe
- Producers: James George Hargreaves, A. Ajai-Ajagbe

Sinitta singles chronology
| "I Could Be" (1983) | "Never Too Late" (1983) | "Cruising" (1984) |

"Never Too Late" is a song by British singer Sinitta. The song was written and produced by James George Hargreaves and A. Ajai-Ajagbe. It was released in 1983 as a standalone single. "Never Too Late" has a smashing break and exists too as a white label press bearing Sinitta's full name, a release containing a shorter version. Jellybean Benitez was hired for doing the Special Extended U.S Mix. No music video was made for this song.

It was added to the special edition of her debut album Sinitta!, released in 2011.

== Formats and track listings ==
7-inch single

1. "Never Too Late" (Special U.S. Mix) – 3:30
2. "Never Too Late" (Original U.K. Mix) – 3:35

12-inch single

1. "Never Too Late" (Special U.S. Extended Mix) – 6:58
2. "Never Too Late" (Instrumental) – 5:20
