= Problematic =

Problematic may refer to:

- Problematic (album), by ALL, 2000
- Problematic, a 2007 album by Chhet Sovanpanha
- "Problematic" (song), by Five Star, 1983
- "Problematic", a song by Bo Burnham from the 2021 soundtrack album Inside (The Songs)
- "Problematic", a song by ¥$ from the 2024 album Vultures 1
- Problematic with Moshe Kasher, a 2017 American TV talk show

== See also ==
- Problematica
- Problem solving
- Woke
