= Naughty Naughty =

Naughty Naughty (or Naughty, Naughty) may refer to:

- Naughty, Naughty (1918 film), an American silent comedy
- Naughty, Naughty (1974 film), (綽頭狀元) a Chinese film directed by Lo Wei
- Naughty Naughty (album), Sinitta album, 1995
- "Naughty Naughty" (John Parr song), 1984
- "Naughty Naughty" (Porcelain Black song), 2011
- "Naughty Naughty", a song by Danger Danger from Danger Danger
