= Hitchin' a Ride =

Hitchin' a Ride may refer to:

- The act of hitchhiking
- "Hitchin' a Ride" (Green Day song)
- "Hitchin' a Ride" (Vanity Fare song)
