= Psyche (album) =

Studio album by PJ & Duncan
- Released: 4 November 1994; 20 September 1995 (Japan)
- Recorded: 1993–94
- Genre: pop rap; teen pop
- Length: 43:02
- Label: Telstar Records
- Producer: Nicky Graham; Deni Lew; Mike Olton

PJ & Duncan chronology
Psyche (1994)	Top Katz (1995)

Singles from Psyche
- 1. "Tonight I'm Free" Released: 6 December 1993; 2. "Why Me?" Released: 11 April 1994; 3. "Let's Get Ready to Rhumble" Released: 11 July 1994; 4. "If I Give You My Number" Released: 26 September 1994; 5. "Eternal Love" Released: 21 November 1994; 6. "Our Radio Rocks" Released: 13 February 1995

Professional ratings
Review scores
Source	Rating
Smash Hits	2/5

Psyche is the debut studio album released by British recording duo PJ & Duncan, now better known as Ant & Dec. Recording on the album began in 1993, following the release of a track the duo performed during their time on Byker Grove, "Rip it Up". The song was then re-worked into their debut single, "Tonight I'm Free", which was released in December 1993 on Telstar Records. The album includes the duo's best known track, "Let's Get Ready to Rhumble", which topped the UK Singles Chart almost two decades after its initial release.

The track would however go on to top the singles chart in 2013, nearly nineteen years after its release, after an impromptu performance of it by the duo on their show Ant & Dec's Saturday Night Takeaway.

The singles "Why Me" and "If I Give You My Number" were also released prior to the album, which was made available on 4 November 1994. Seven singles were released from the album over the course of eighteen months.

The album peaked at no. 5 on the UK Albums Chart, and was certified Platinum in the UK by the BPI. The album was reissued in Singapore in 1995, under the title Eternal Love, containing bonus remixes of "Eternal Love" itself and "Our Radio Rocks". The album was also reissued in Japan in 1995, under the title Our Radio Rocks, with the additional of remixes of "Our Radio Rocks" itself, "If I Give You My Number" and "Let's Get Ready to Rhumble". Aside from a heavy number of remixes, alternate versions, and continuations of the spoken-word eulogy "The PJ and Duncan Show", three new songs were issued as B-sides: "Style with a Smile", "So Many Questions" and "I'm a Loser", which were all written by album composers Nicky Graham, Deni Lew and Mike Olton.

== Track listing ==
- All songs except "Tonight I'm Free" composed and produced by Nicky Graham, Deni Lew and Mike Olton
- "Tonight I'm Free" written by Richie Wermerling and produced by Nicky Graham

Psyche
No.	Title	Length
1.	"Let's Get Ready to Rhumble"	4:00
2.	"One Look"	4:03
3.	"Why Me?"	3:33
4.	"She Scores a Perfect Ten"	4:12
5.	"Tonight I'm Free 94" (featuring Lily Gonzales and the cast of Byker Grove)	3:48
6.	"Eternal Love"	3:58
7.	"If I Give You My Number"	3:16
8.	"Talk About It"	3:48
9.	"Girlfriend"	4:11
10.	"Our Radio Rocks"	4:04
11.	"I Want You"	4:29
12.	"Free as a Bird"	4:24
13.	"The PJ & Duncan Show: Psyche!" (Hidden track)	4:03

Our Radio Rocks
No.	Title	Length
1.	"Our Radio Rocks" ('95 Radio Remix)	4:01
2.	"Let's Get Ready to Rhumble"	4:00
3.	"One Look"	4:03
4.	"Why Me?"	3:33
5.	"She Scores a Perfect Ten"	4:12
6.	"Tonight I'm Free" ('94 Remix) (featuring Lily Gonzales and the cast of Byker Grove)	3:48
7.	"Eternal Love"	3:58
8.	"If I Give You My Number"	3:16
9.	"Talk About It"	3:48
10.	"Girlfriend"	4:11
11.	"Our Radio Rocks"	4:04
12.	"I Want You"	4:29
13.	"Free as a Bird"	4:24
14.	"Let's Get Ready to Rhumble" (Housey Housey Mix)	8:16
15.	"If I Give You My Number" (Toon Army House Mix)	4:18
16.	"Our Radio Rocks" (Super Mix)	5:17

Eternal Love
No.	Title	Length
1.	"Eternal Love" (100% Pure Love Remix)	3:58
2.	"Let's Get Ready to Rhumble"	4:00
3.	"One Look"	4:03
4.	"Why Me?"	3:33
5.	"She Scores a Perfect Ten"	4:12
6.	"Tonight I'm Free" ('94 Remix) (featuring Lily Gonzales and the cast of Byker Grove)	3:48
7.	"Eternal Love"	3:58
8.	"If I Give You My Number"	3:16
9.	"Talk About It"	3:48
10.	"Girlfriend"	4:11
11.	"Our Radio Rocks"	4:04
12.	"I Want You"	4:29
13.	"Free as a Bird"	4:24
14.	"Eternal Love" (Slow Groove Dance Mix)	3:58
15.	"Our Radio Rocks" ('95 Radio Remix)	4:04

== Charts ==
Chart (1994)	Peak position
European Albums Chart	26
German Albums Chart	90
Japanese Albums Chart	54
Scottish Albums Chart	8
UK Albums Chart	5

== Certifications ==
Region	Certification	Certified units/sales
United Kingdom (BPI)	Platinum	300,000^{^}
United Kingdom (BPI) Video certification	Gold	25,000^{*}
^{*} Sales figures based on certification alone.^{^} Shipments figures based on certification alone.
