= Tonight I'm Free =

Single by PJ & Duncan

from the album Psyche
- Released: 6 December 1993
- Label: Telstar
- Songwriter(s): Richie Wermerling
- Producer(s): Nicky Graham

PJ & Duncan singles chronology
"Tonight I'm Free" (1993)	"Why Me?" (1994)

"Tonight I'm Free" is the debut single by English pop duo PJ & Duncan. It was originally performed on the children's drama show Byker Grove before the decision was made to officially release it as a single. A 1994 remix was included on their debut album Psyche and features cast members from the show.

== Track listing ==
CD single

No.	Title	Length
1.	"Tonight I'm Free" (radio mix)	3:49
2.	"Tonight I'm Free" (Cool mix)	3:52
3.	"Tonight I'm Free" (12-inch mix)	6:06
4.	"Tonight I'm Free" (instrumental)	3:48

== Charts ==
Chart (1993)	Peak position
UK Singles (OCC)	62
