= Perfect (PJ & Duncan song) =

1995 PJ & Duncan song

Single by PJ & Duncan

from the album Top Katz
- Released: 20 November 1995
- Length: 3:55
- Label: Telstar
- Songwriter(s): McPartlin, Donnelly, Richie Wermeling
- Producer(s): Ray Hedges

PJ & Duncan singles chronology
"U Krazy Katz" (1995)	"Perfect" (1995)	"Stepping Stone" (1995)

Music video
- "Perfect" on YouTube

"Perfect" a song by British television presenting duo PJ & Duncan, released as the third single from their second album, Top Katz (1995).

== Charts ==
Chart (1995)	Peak position
UK Singles (OCC)	16
