= Our Radio Rocks =

1995 single by PJ & Duncan

Single by PJ & Duncan

from the album Psyche
- Released: 13 February 1995
- Length: 3:41
- Label: Telstar
- Songwriters: Nicholas Lynedoch Graham; Denise Paulette Lewis; Michael Olton McCollin
- Producer: Nicky Graham

PJ & Duncan singles chronology
| "Eternal Love" (1994) | "Our Radio Rocks" (1995) | "Stuck On U" (1995) |

Music video
- "Our Radio Rocks" on YouTube

"Our Radio Rocks" is a song by British television presenting duo PJ & Duncan, released on 13 February 1995 by Telstar Records as the final single from their debut album, Psyche (1994). It was written by Nicholas Lynedoch Graham, Denise Paulette Lewis and Michael Olton McCollin, and produced by Graham. The song reached number 15 on the UK Singles Chart. The music video shows the duo singing with several scenes showing dancers and a model of a transmitter atop a planet.

== Critical reception ==
Tony Cross from Smash Hits gave "Our Radio Rocks" three out of five, writing, "Their radio, their radio, their radio rocks! Perhaps some top blokes at Radio One might like to know just what station PJ & Duncan have turned into... Anyway, this is the floppy-chinned duo's sparkling return to jump-about, weedy rap that sizzled with 'Let's Get Ready to Rhumble'. Though not as good as that, it has some ridiculous rhymes, a jump about bit in the middle, and the two little fellas giving it their best shot. It's better than the album version too." In his review of the Psyche album, Smash Hits editor Mark Frith noted that "they are good" on songs like "Our Radio Rocks", and that "they come on like East 17's kid brothers: all frenetic hip hop beats and zestful enthusiasm."

== Charts ==
| Chart (1995) | Peak position |
|---|---|
| UK Singles (OCC) | 15 |
| UK Airplay (Music Week) | 25 |
