= Sinitta! =

Studio album by Sinitta
- Released: 14 December 1987
- Recorded: 1983–1987
- Genre: Pop, dance-pop
- Length: 46:38
- Label: Fanfare Records
- Producer: Stock, Aitken and Waterman; Trevor Vallis; James George Hargreaves; Paul Hardcastle

Sinitta chronology
Sinitta! (1987)	Wicked (1988)

Singles from Sinitta!
- 1. "Cruising" Released: 1984/1985; 2. "So Macho" Released: 1985/1986; 3. "Feels Like The First Time" Released: September 1986; 4. "Toy Boy" Released: July 1987; 5. "GTO" Released: November 1987; 6. "Cross My Broken Heart" Released: February 1988

Professional ratings
Review scores
Source	Rating
AllMusic	3/5 stars
Number One	3/5 stars
Record Mirror	4/5 stars
Smash Hits	8/10

Sinitta! is the debut studio album by British singer Sinitta, released in 1987. It features her biggest and best-known international hit single "So Macho".

== Background ==
In 1987, Simon Cowell, then a talent scout, became closely associated with record producer Pete Waterman and would spend time with Waterman at his PWL studios complex, being mentored by him and learning about the effective running of a successful music business.

Around this time, Cowell was desperate for writing and production trio Stock Aitken Waterman (SAW) to work with Sinitta. "Feels Like the First Time", Sinitta's follow-up single to "So Macho", had charted low (UK number 45) and had only spent 5 weeks on the chart, whereas, in contrast, "So Macho" had been on the UK chart for 28 weeks in 1986, where it had peaked at number 2. Initially Waterman declined to work with Sinitta, claiming that SAW were too busy. In the end though, SAW did work with Sinitta and her first single with the Hit Factory was "Toy Boy".

== Critical reception ==
A review in Music Week magazine was critical of Sinitta!, saying that "it would be churlish to totally denigrate this debut LP" and while it praised Sinitta's vocal performance, it blamed the songs for sounding "like chanting nursery rhymes or Seventies-flavoured disco songs". It concluded that the album "doesn't have the aplomb of Mel and Kim or the tiny appeal of Bananarama, but kids in the eight-13 age bracket will love it". By contrast, Nancy Culp of Record Mirror gave the album four stars of five, saying that Sinitta's "silly, fluffy bits of nonsense are the business" and that the light lyrics as well as the fact that SAW reuse the same riffs do not really matter. She added that the songs are "plain and simple, and just good fun" and concluded that the album "has to be the Christmas party record for wallies of all ages". Ron Wynn of AllMusic noted that the album "didn't have a song as clever or naughty as "So Many Men, So Little Time", recorded by Sinitta's mother Miquel Brown, and added that the singer's "crushed, coy voice made the point in a cutesy manner". By contrast, retrospectively, in a 2015 review, the Pop Rescue website gave the album four stars out of five, saying it was "fantastic... pumped with energy, and the hits kept rolling, with little pause for a duff track. It's a perfect 80's pop romp". Richard Lowe of Smash Hits praised the tracks produced by SAW, but found those by Paul Hardcastle "a wee bit dull", and concluded: "It's quite smashing. Honestly!"

== Singles ==
"Cruising", "So Macho" and "Feels Like the First Time" were the three first singles from the album. The fourth one, "Toy Boy" was a massive hit, reaching number four in the UK in July 1987 and staying on the charts for 14 weeks. The song was the 27th best-selling single of 1987 in the UK, selling more than some number ones from that year, including Michael Jackson and Siedah Garrett's "I Just Can't Stop Loving You" and Steve "Silk" Hurley's "Jack Your Body". Two further singles were released from Sinitta!: "GTO" (UK number 15 in December 1987) and "Cross My Broken Heart" (UK number six in March 1988).

== Track listing ==
Original vinyl edition
No.	Title	Writer(s)	Producer(s)	Length
1.	"Toy Boy"	Stock Aitken Waterman	Stock Aitken Waterman	3:25
2.	"Who's Gonna Catch You (When You Fall)"	Stock Aitken Waterman	Stock Aitken Waterman	3:20
3.	"Cross My Broken Heart"	Stock Aitken Waterman	Stock Aitken Waterman	6:50
4.	"G.T.O."	Stock Aitken Waterman	Stock Aitken Waterman	3:30
5.	"Rock Me Slow"	Bob Mitchell; Nick Graham	Trevor Vallis	4:54
6.	"So Macho"	James George Hargreaves	Hargreaves; Mick Parker	3:25
7.	"Oh Boy (You've Got a Lot to Learn)"	Paul Hardcastle	Hardcastle	5:15
8.	"If I Let You Go"	Hardcastle	Hardcastle	7:09
9.	"Feels Like the First Time"	Hargreaves	Hargreaves; Parker	3:50
10.	"Cruising"	Hargreaves	Hargreaves; Parker	5:04

Original CD edition
No.	Title	Writer(s)	Producer(s)	Length
3.	"Cross My Broken Heart" (single version)	Stock Aitken Waterman	Stock Aitken Waterman	3:43
7.	"Oh Boy (You've Got a Lot to Learn)" (edit)	Hardcastle	Hardcastle	3:30
8.	"If I Let You Go" (edit)	Hardcastle	Hardcastle	4:35

Expanded edition CD1 bonus tracks
No.	Title	Writer(s)	Producer(s)	Length
11.	"Showdown"	Hargreaves	Hargreaves; Parker
12.	"Never Too Late" (special US mix)	Hargreaves	Hargreaves; Anthony Ajai-Ajagbe; John "Jellybean" Benitez (Note: Indicates a remixer.)
13.	"I Could Be" (special US mix (Note: Indicates tracks appearing on CD for the first time.))	Hargreaves	Hargreaves; Ajai-Ajagbe; Haakon Brenner
14.	"So Macho" (extended club mix)	Hargreaves	Hargreaves; Parker
15.	"Toy Boy" (the extended Bicep Mix)	Stock Aitken Waterman	Stock Aitken Waterman
16.	"G.T.O." (Modina's Red Roaring Mix)	Stock Aitken Waterman	Stock Aitken Waterman
17.	"Cross My Broken Heart" (Cupid's Avenging Mix)	Stock Aitken Waterman	Stock Aitken Waterman

Expanded edition CD2
No.	Title	Writer(s)	Producer(s)	Length
1.	"Cruising" (original 12" mix)	Hargreaves	Hargreaves; Parker
2.	"So Macho" (12" remix)	Hargreaves	Hargreaves; Parker
3.	"Toy Boy" (brand new megamix)	Stock Aitken Waterman	Stock Aitken Waterman; Pete Hammond
4.	"Cross My Broken Heart" (extra Pulsing Beat Mix)	Stock Aitken Waterman	Stock Aitken Waterman; Hammond
5.	"Feels Like the First Time" (special extended club mix)	Hargreaves	Hargreaves; Parker; Les "Mix Doctor" Adams
6.	"Oh Boy (You've Got a Lot to Learn)" (extended version)	Hardcastle	Hardcastle
7.	"If I Let You Go" (extended version)	Hardcastle	Hardcastle
8.	"Never Too Late" (special extended US mix)	Hargreaves	Hargreaves; Ajai-Ajagbe; Benitez
9.	"I Could Be" (special extended US mix)	Hargreaves	Hargreaves; Ajai-Ajagbe; Brenner
10.	"Showdown" (special dance mix)	Hargreaves	Hargreaves; Parker
11.	"Cross My Broken Heart" (Dave Ford mix)	Stock Aitken Waterman	Stock Aitken Waterman; Dave Ford
12.	"Toy Boy" (instrumental)	Stock Aitken Waterman	Stock Aitken Waterman
13.	"G.T.O." (instrumental)	Stock Aitken Waterman	Stock Aitken Waterman
14.	"Cross My Broken Heart" (instrumental)	Stock Aitken Waterman	Stock Aitken Waterman

== Charts and sales ==
=== Weekly charts ===
1987–1988 chart performance for Sinitta!
Chart (1987–1988)	Peak position
Australian Albums (Kent Music Report)	69
Finland Albums (The Official Finnish Charts)	7
Japanese Albums (Oricon)	37
New Zealand Albums (RMNZ)	38
UK Albums (OCC)	34

=== Certifications ===
Certifications for Sinitta!
Region	Certification	Certified units/sales
United Kingdom (BPI)	Gold	200,000
