= Top Katz =

Studio album by PJ & Duncan
- Released: 3 November 1995
- Recorded: 1994–1995
- Genre: Pop; pop rap; teen pop
- Length: 44:32
- Label: Sony BMG
- Producer: Ray Hedges; Martin Brannigan; Nicky Graham; Deni Lew

PJ & Duncan chronology
Psyche (1994)	Top Katz (1995)	The Cult of Ant & Dec (1997)

Singles from Top Katz
- 1. "Stuck On U" Released: 17 July 1995; 2. "U Krazy Katz" Released: 1 October 1995; 3. "Perfect" Released: 20 November 1995; 4. "Stepping Stone" Released: 18 March 1996

Professional ratings
Review scores
Source	Rating
Smash Hits	3/5 stars

Top Katz is the second studio album released by British duo PJ & Duncan, now better known as Ant & Dec. The album was recorded during 1994 and 1995, and included the duo's cover of The Monkees song, Stepping Stone. The album was released in November 1995, peaking at number 46 on the UK Albums Chart, and being certified Gold in the UK by the BPI.

== Background ==
Following the moderate success of their debut studio album, Psyche, the duo returned to the studio, and were hooked up with songwriter and producer Ray Hedges, who had success the previous year, having produced the majority of Boyzone's debut album. For the first time, McPartlin and Donnelly turned their hand to songwriting, and co-wrote the majority of the album, with the exception of their cover of The Monkees' "Stepping Stone". The album's lead single, Stuck On U, was released in July 1995, accompanied by a music video filmed in Miami. The single's moderate success paved the way for the second single, U Krazy Katz, which followed in October, and saw a slight change in musical direction for the duo.

The album was released on 3 November 1995, but was a commercial failure, only peaking at number 46 on the UK Albums Chart. Promotion for the album continued with the release of the third single, Perfect, on 20 November, which followed a similar theme to the duo's early hit, "Eternal Love". A promotional tour of Asia and America followed, accompanied by the release of the fifth and final single, Stepping Stone, in March 1996. A deluxe edition of the album was released in Japan on 2 February 1996, containing two bonus tracks, two remixes and a megamix of all the duo's singles. A special Asian edition of the album also includes a bonus club mix of "Stuck on U" plus an acoustic rendition of "Perfect".

== Track listing ==
No.	Title	Writer(s)	Producer(s)	Length
1.	"U Krazy Katz"	Anthony McPartlin, Declan Donnelly, Ray Hedges, Martin Brannigan	Ray Hedges	3:00
2.	"Perfect"	McPartlin, Donnelly, Richie Wermeling	Mike Olton	3:50
3.	"Stuck On U"	McPartlin, Donnelly, Hedges, Brannigan	Ray Hedges	3:18
4.	"You Are the One"	McPartlin, Donnelly, Hedges, Brannigan	Ray Hedges	3:15
5.	"Love and Devotion"	McPartlin, Donnelly, Hedges, Brannigan	Ray Hedges	3:22
6.	"Stepping Stone"	Tommy Boyce, Bobby Hart	Nicky Graham	3:00
7.	"Always Be My Love"	McPartlin, Donnelly, Hedges, Brannigan, Richard Stannard, James Rowbottom	Ray Hedges	3:20
8.	"By Your Side"	McPartlin, Donnelly, Hedges, Brannigan	Ray Hedges	3:39
9.	"Gonna B Alright"	McPartlin, Donnelly, Hedges, Brannigan	Ray Hedges	3:40
10.	"Somewhere in the Rain"	McPartlin, Donnelly, Hedges, Brannigan	Ray Hedges	4:00
11.	"Easy Riser"	McPartlin, Donnelly, Hedges, Brannigan	Ray Hedges	3:30
12.	"U Krazy Katz" (Clock Remix)	McPartlin, Donnelly, Hedges, Brannigan	Ray Hedges	4:23

Japanese deluxe edition bonus tracks
No.	Title	Writer(s)	Producer(s)	Length
13.	"In Your Arms"	McPartlin, Donnelly, Hedges, Brannigan	Ray Hedges	3:34
14.	"Boom! There She Was"	McPartlin, Donnelly, Hedges, Brannigan	Ray Hedges	3:14
15.	"U Krazy Katz" (The W.U.J Cushty Mix)	McPartlin, Donnelly, Hedges, Brannigan	Ray Hedges	5:36
16.	"Stuck On U" (The W.U.J Cushty Mix)	McPartlin, Donnelly, Hedges, Brannigan	Ray Hedges	6:57
17.	"Megamix"	McPartlin, Donnelly, Hedges, Brannigan, Graham, Lew, Olton, Wermeling	Ray Hedges	9:03
18.	"Our Radio Rocks"	Mcpartlin Donnelly Hedges, Brannigan, Graham, Lew, Olton, Wermeling	Max Headroom	3.39

Asian special edition bonus tracks
No.	Title	Writer(s)	Producer(s)	Length
13.	"Stuck On U" (Nuff Club Mix)	McPartlin, Donnelly, Hedges, Brannigan	Ray Hedges	5:56
14.	"Perfect" (Acoustic Version)	McPartlin, Donnelly, Richie Wermeling	Mike Olton	3:57

== Charts ==
Chart performance for Top Katz
Chart (1995)	Peak position
Australian Albums (ARIA)	49
Japanese Albums (Oricon)	27
Scottish Albums (OCC)	55
UK Albums (OCC)	46

== Certifications ==
Certifications for Top Katz
Region	Certification	Certified units/sales
United Kingdom (BPI)	Gold	100,000^{^}
^{^} Shipments figures based on certification alone.
