= Jack Reno =

American country music singer-songwriter (1935–2008)

- Born: November 30, 1935; Bloomfield, Iowa, U.S.
- Died: November 1, 2008 (aged 72) Florence, Kentucky, U.S
- Genres: Country
- Occupation: Singer
- Instrument: Guitar
- Years active: 1967–1974
- Labels: JAB, Fono-Graf, Dot, Target, United Artists

Jack Reno (November 30, 1935 – November 1, 2008) was an American country singer.

== Career ==
Born in Bloomfield, Iowa, United States, Reno appeared at the Grand Ole Opry in the 1960s, and played with Waylon Jennings and Dolly Parton. He recorded seven albums and scored 12 hits on the American country music charts, including "Hitchin' a Ride", "Repeat After Me" and "I Want One".

In addition, he was a long-time country music DJ, with stints in Cincinnati, Ohio and Omaha, Nebraska. He was named the Country Music Association's Disc Jockey of the Year in 1978.

== Death ==
Reno died of brain cancer on November 1, 2008, in Florence, Kentucky.

== Discography ==
=== Albums ===
Year	Album	US Country	Label
1967	Meet Jack Reno	41	JAB
1968	I Want One	—	Dot
1969	I'm a Good Man in a Bad Frame of Mind	30	Dot
1972	Hitchin' a Ride	44	Target
1979	Interstate 7	—	Derbytown
1980	Hitchin' a Ride to the Country	—	Lucky Lady
1990	Nine Stitches	—	Eagle

=== Singles ===
Year	Single	US Country	Label
1967	"Repeat After Me"	10	Meet Jack Reno
1968	"How Sweet It Is (To Be in Love with You)"	41	Meet Jack Reno
1968	"I Want One"	19	I Want One
1969	"I'm a Good Man (In a Bad Frame of Mind)"	34	I'm a Good Man in a Bad Frame of Mind
1969	"We All Go Crazy"	22	I'm a Good Man in a Bad Frame of Mind
1970	"That's the Way I See It"	67	Single only
1971	"Hitchin' a Ride"	12	Hitchin' a Ride
1972	"Heartaches by the Number"	26	Hitchin' a Ride
1972	"Do You Want to Dance"	38	Singles only
1973	"Beautiful Sunday"	67	Singles only
1974	"Let the Four Winds Blow"	57	Singles only
1974	"Jukebox"	70	Singles only
