= Stuck On U =

1995 single by PJ & Duncan

Single by PJ & Duncan

from the album Top Katz
- Released: 1995
- Length: 3:21
- Label: Telstar
- Songwriters: Anthony McPartlin, Declan Donnelly, Ray Hedges, Martin Brannigan
- Producer: Ray Hedges

PJ & Duncan singles chronology
"Our Radio Rocks" (1995)	"Stuck On U" (1995)	"U Krazy Katz" (1995)

Music video
- "Stuck On U" on YouTube

"Stuck On U" is a song by British musical duo PJ & Duncan, the first to be taken from their second album, Top Katz (1995). Released as a single in 1995, the song reached number 12 on the UK Singles Chart that July.

== Charts ==
Chart (1995)	Peak position
Europe (Eurochart Hot 100)	72
Scotland Singles (OCC)	10
UK Singles (OCC)	12
UK Airplay (Music Week)	31
UK Pop Tip Club Chart (Music Week)	38
