= If I Give You My Number =

1994 single by PJ & Duncan AKA

Single by PJ & Duncan AKA

from the album Psyche
- B-side: "Style with a Smile"
- Released: 26 September 1994
- Genre: Pop rap
- Label: XS Rhythm
- Songwriters: Nicky Graham; Denise P Lewis; Michael O. McCollin
- Producer: Nicky Graham

PJ & Duncan AKA singles chronology
"Let's Get Ready to Rhumble" (1994)	"If I Give You My Number" (1994)	"Eternal Love" (1994)

Music video
- "If I Give You My Number" on YouTube

"If I Give You My Number" is the fourth single by British recording duo PJ & Duncan, released on 26 September 1994 by XS Rhythm from their debut album, Psyche (1994). It was written by Nicky Graham, Denise P Lewis and Michael O. McCollin, and produced by Graham. The song became a top-20 hit in the UK, peaking at number 15 on the UK Singles Chart. "If I Give You My Number" was also nominated in the category for Best Single at the 1995 Smash Hits Awards. The single's cover parodies the Pet Shop Boys' 1987 album Actually.

== Critical reception ==
Leesa Daniels from Smash Hits gave "If I Give You My Number" a top score of five out of five, writing, "Now they're here again with a corker of a rap/pop tune, by golly it's marvellous. The lads ask a mysterious girlie If I give you my number, will you call? YESSS! Scream at last half the female population! Ant and Dec truly are the cheeriest and most lovable boys in pop!"

== Track listings ==
CDANT2

No.	Title	Length
1.	"If I Give You My Number" (100% radio mix)
2.	"If I Give You My Number" (Toon Army house mix)
3.	"The PJ & Duncan Show - Part 3! "Tea for Two""
4.	"If I Give You My Number" (Syze Up mellow mix)

CDDEC2

No.	Title	Length
1.	"If I Give You My Number" (100% radio mix)
2.	"If I Give You My Number" (Cool Groovin' mix)
3.	"The PJ & Duncan Show - Part 4! "Short, Back & Sides""
4.	"Style with a Smile"

== Charts ==
=== Weekly charts ===
Chart (1994)	Peak position
Israel (IBA)	36
UK Singles (OCC)	15
UK Airplay (Music Week)	25

=== Year-end charts ===
Chart (1994)	Position
UK Singles (OCC)	137
