= Close to Perfection =

Studio album by Miquel Brown
- Released: 1985
- Genre: Hi-NRG, dance, pop
- Length: 59:43
- Label: Record Shack Records
- Producer: Ian Levine, Fiachra Trench

Miquel Brown chronology
Manpower (1983)	Close to Perfection (1985)

Close to Perfection is a 1985 Hi-NRG album by Miquel Brown, produced by Ian Levine and Fiachra Trench. It was released through Record Shack Records. The album includes the single "Close to Perfection" and the hard rock-influenced "Black Leather." Others singles released from the album include "One Way Street" and "Love Reputation" both getting extended club mixes. The album has been issued on CD three times: 1991 (USA), 1995 (UK), and 2014 (UK) as part of a two CD set featuring remixes and rarities from Manpower and Close To Perfection albums featuring sleeve notes and new interviews with Ian Levine .

== Track listing ==
- Tracks written and arranged by Ian Levine and Fiachra Trench unless stated

No.	Title	Length
1.	"One Hundred Per Cent"	7:32
2.	"Learn the Lines of Love"	6:13
3.	"Close to Perfection"	8:10
4.	"White Lace" (featuring Miquel Brown)	4:59
5.	"The Easy Way Out"	7:42
6.	"Love Reputation"	3:53
7.	"Black Leather"	7:52
8.	"One Way Street" (featuring Levine, Trench, Brown)	9:43
9.	"Blind Date"	3:39
Total length:		59:43
