= U Krazy Katz =

Single by PJ & Duncan

from the album Top Katz
- Released: October 1, 1995
- Recorded: 1994–1995
- Genre: Pop; jazz pop
- Label: Telstar Records
- Songwriters: Martin Brannigan; Declan Donnelly; Ray Hedges; Ant McPartlin
- Producer: Ray Hedges

PJ & Duncan singles chronology
"Stuck On U" (1995)	"U Krazy Katz" (1995)	"Perfect" (1995)

Music video
- "U Krazy Katz" on YouTube

"U Krazy Katz" is the eighth single by British television presenting duo PJ & Duncan and the second to be taken from their second album Top Katz (1995). As a single, it was released on 1 October 1995 by Telstar Records and reached number 15 on the UK Singles Chart. The accompanying music video shows PJ & Duncan performing in a jazz club, which features a young David Walliams.

== Critical reception ==
Siân Pattenden from Smash Hits gave "U Krazy Katz" a top score of five out of five and named it Best New Single, writing, "Wow! Acid jazz funkmobility in the area! PJ & Duncan are the Tom & Jerry of pop, and continue to produce great tune after great tune. [...] This is a send-up of Cool Vibe music that People In Cafés listen to: all popped-up and with what sound like 37 ravers in the background, knocking back the Tango. Then — then(!) — the song draws to a close and Dec says goodbye to Ant with a cheery; "See you tomorrow". Great ending. Super beginning. Ace middle bit — a winner and a half."

== Charts ==
Chart (1995-1996)	Peak position
Estonia (Eesti Top 20)	16
France Airplay (SNEP)	38
UK Singles (OCC)	15
UK Airplay (Music Week)	23
