= Manpower (album) =

Studio album by Miquel Brown
- Released: 1983
- Recorded: 1982–1983
- Studio: Trident Studios, London. Vocals Berwick Street Studios, London
- Genre: Hi-NRG; Soul
- Length: 43:39
- Label: Record Shack, TSR
- Producer: Ian Levine, Fiachra Trench

Miquel Brown chronology
Symphony of Love (1978)	Manpower (1983)	Close to Perfection (1985)

Professional ratings
Review scores
Source	Rating
Allmusic	4/5 stars

Manpower is an album by Miquel Brown, recorded in 1983. It includes the major international hits "So Many Men, So Little Time" and "He's a Saint, He's a Sinner" which peaked at number two and number twenty-nine respectively on the US dance charts, as well as the moderate hits "Beeline" and "Sunny Day."

== Track listing ==
All tracks composed by Ian Levine and Fiachra Trench; arranged by Fiachra Trench

1. "Man Power" - 8:00
2. "Beeline" - 9:34
3. "Sunny Day" - 4:39
4. "He's a Saint, He's a Sinner" - 8:33
5. "Maybe He Forgot" - 4:41
6. "So Many Men, So Little Time - 8:12

== Personnel ==
- Miquel Brown - vocals
- Fiachra Trench, Nick Glennie-Smith - synthesizer and Linn drum programming
- Fiachra Trench - keyboards, co-producer
- Andy Peak - bass on "Sunny Day" and "Maybe He Forgot"
- Luís Jardim - timpani on "Manpower"
- Jeff Daly, Malcolm Griffiths, Martin Drover - horns on ""Sunny Day"
- Miquel Brown, Marilyn David, Ruby James, Sylvia Mason-James, Earlene Bentley, Yvonne Gidden, Miss Piggy, Fiachra Trench, Sarah McMahon, Wavelength, The Trotters
