= Why Me (PJ & Duncan song) =

"Why Me?"

Single by PJ & Duncan

from the album Psyche
- Released: 11 April 1994
- Label: Telstar
- Songwriters: Deni Lew; Mike Olton; Nicky Graham
- Producer: Nicky Graham

PJ & Duncan singles chronology
"Tonight I'm Free" (1993)	"Why Me?" (1994)	"Let's Get Ready to Rhumble" (1994)

Music video
- "Why Me?" on YouTube

"Why Me?" is a song by British television presenting duo PJ & Duncan, released in April 1994, by Telstar Records, as the second single from their debut album, Psyche (1994). The song is written by Deni Lew, Mike Olton and Nicky Graham, and produced by Graham. It was the duo's first single to reach the top 40 on the UK Singles Chart, peaking at number 27. The accompanying music video was a Box Top on British music television channel The Box in May 1994.

== Critical reception ==
Mark Frith from Smash Hits gave the song a score of four out of five, writing, "In which PJ and Duncan listen to 'Jump' by Kris Kross a few too many times and try a similar chanted thing with piano samples running through and a chant of why me?. Every idea on it belongs to someone else but for some reason the whole thing really works. A fun, exciting happening record only let down by slightly weak lead vocals and the occasional crap harmonies. Not a hit 'cause radio stations won't touch it but it actually deserves to be one!"

== Track listing ==
CD single

No.	Title	Length
1.	"Why Me?" (radio mix)
2.	"Why Me?" (Klassy Klub mix)
3.	"Tonight I'm Free" (Cool mix)
4.	"Why Me?" (TV Chant mix)

== Charts ==
Chart (1994)	Peak position
UK Singles (OCC)	27
