= Wicked (Sinitta album) =

Studio album by Sinitta
- Released: 26 November 1989
- Genres: R&B, pop, soul, disco
- Length: 54:02 (CD Version); 43:32 (Vinyl Version)
- Label: Fanfare
- Producers: Stock Aitken Waterman; Ralf Rene Maue; Pete Hammond; Phil Harding; Ian Curnow; Nigel Wright

Sinitta chronology
Sinitta! (1987)	Wicked (1989)	Naughty Naughty (1995)

Singles from Wicked
- 1. "I Don't Believe in Miracles" Released: 14 September 1988; 2. "Right Back Where We Started From" Released: May 1989; 3. "Love On a Mountain Top" Released: September 1989; 4. "Lay Me Down Easy" Released: December 1989; 5. "Hitchin' a Ride" Released: April 1990

Wicked is the second studio album by British singer Sinitta. It was released in 1989. It was less successful than her 1987 self-titled debut, but included the hit single "Right Back Where We Started From" which reached number 4 in the UK and was her only charting hit in her native US, peaking at number 84 on Billboard's Hot 100 Chart.

== Background and production ==
Following the release of her debut album Sinitta! in 1987 Sinitta moved away from working directly with Stock Aitken Waterman although she continued to record at PWL under the direction of Pete Hammond, Phil Harding and Ian Curnow. Her second album, Wicked released in 1989 contained only one SAW track- "I Don't Believe in Miracles", two other tracks recorded with SAW in the same sessions "How Can This Be Real Love" and "Do You Wanna Find Out?" were ultimately shelved. The remaining tracks were produced by the aforementioned Hammond, Harding & Curnow in addition to Nigel Wright and German producer Ralf-René Maué (London Boys).

== Critical reception ==
Retrospectively, in a 2023 review, the Pop Rescue website gave the album four stars out of five, saying that "there are some really fantastic songs here", underlining "Right Back Where We Started From" and "Love on a Mountain Top" as the best tracks, and stated that the album is "one that you should play if you're a S/A/W and PWL fan".

== Chart performance ==
Wicked was a minor success on the charts. It missed the top 40 in the United Kingdom and peaked at number 52. The album's second single "Right Back Where We Started From" became Sinitta's only charting single in her native US, peaking at number 84 on the Billboard Hot 100 in 1989.

== Track listing ==
=== 1989 edition ===
No.	Title	Writer(s)	Producer(s)	Length
1.	"Right Back Where We Started From"	Pierre Tubbs; J. Vincent Edwards	Pete Hammond	3:11
2.	"I Don't Believe in Miracles"	Stock Aitken Waterman	Stock Aitken Waterman	3:33
3.	"I Just Wanna Spend Some Time With You"	Hammond	Hammond	3:26
4.	"Hitchin' a Ride"	Mitch Murray; Peter Callander	Ralf René Maué	3:40
5.	"Lay Me Down Easy"	Maué	Maué	3:40
6.	"You Keep Me Hangin' On"	Phil Harding; Ian Curnow	Harding; Curnow	3:29
7.	"Right Back Where We Started From" (12" remix)	Tubbs; Edwards	Pete Hammond	5:20
8.	"Love on a Mountain Top"	Mac Gayden; Buzz Cason	Harding; Curnow	3:22
9.	"Love Love Love"	Maué	Maué	3:46
10.	"Where Do Nice Girls Go"	Nigel Wright	Wright	3:40
11.	"Body Shopping"	Harding; Curnow	Harding; Curnow	3:15
12.	"Don't Tell Me Not To Cry"	Harding; Curnow	Harding; Curnow	3:55
13.	"It Would Be So Easy"	Wright	Wright	3:30
14.	"I Just Can't Help It"	Harding; Curnow	Harding; Curnow	3:45
15.	"Love on a Mountain Top" (12" remix)	Gayden; Cason	Harding; Curnow	5:50

- Tracks 7, 14 and 15 are CD-only bonus tracks.

== Charts ==
Chart (1989–1990)	Peak position
Australian Albums (ARIA)	136
UK Albums (CIN)	52
