= Miquel Brown =

Canadian singer (born 1945)

- Born: Michael Brown; 8 February 1945 (age 81); Montreal, Quebec, Canada
- Origin: Vancouver, British Columbia, Canada
- Genres: Disco; Soul; Hi-NRG; Club/Dance; R&B; Pop rock
- Occupations: Actress; Singer; Music video director; Dancer (formerly)
- Instrument: Vocals
- Years active: 1973–present
- Labels: Record Shack, TSR, Nightmare, Infinity

Miquel Brown (born Michael Brown; February 8, 1945) is a Canadian actress, disco/soul singer, former dancer and music video director, in the 1970s and 1980s, most popular for the songs "Close to Perfection" and the Hi-NRG songs "So Many Men – So Little Time" and "He's a Saint, He's a Sinner". Originally named Michael, her parents changed the spelling (but retained the pronunciation) so as not to confuse her with a male producer and children's author of the time (Michael Brown).

Brown is the mother of singer Sinitta and stepsister of Amii Stewart.

== Early life ==
Brown was born in Montreal, Quebec and raised in Vancouver, British Columbia, Canada. She gave birth to twins Sinitta and Greta at the age of 14, although Sinitta has publicly given her birth year as 1963, not 1959.

Brown was prompted to leave university after she auditioned for the U.S. touring company of the musical Hair and landed the part of Sheila. At the end of the Hair tour, she visited Australia.

In 1973, Brown was cast as the lead in Decameron '73 at the Roadhouse in London. She was then interviewed on the Michael Parkinson Show. In 1975 she appeared in the film Rollerball with James Caan, as well as in the role of Miriam in the television film Regan in 1974 for the Armchair Cinema ITV strand, which was effectively the pilot for The Sweeney TV series. She also held a two-year association with the singing and dancing group 'Second Generation'.

Through the next two years, Brown performed various parts in Bubbling Brown Sugar and television appearances in Seaside Special (on Saturday, 25 June 1977), Supersonic (on Saturday, 5 March 1977 – show 40), The Ronnie Corbett Show, Jack Parnell's Show, Vince Hill's Musical Time Machine and Bruce Forsyth's Bring on the Girls.

== Music career ==
In 1976, Brown played Sister Anna in the musical Mardi Gras (which opened on 18 March at the Prince of Wales Theatre, London). It was through this that she was discovered and signed for her first record release, "First Time Around". This led her to musician Alan Hawkshaw (of Emile Ford and the Checkmates, The Shadows and Love De-Luxe), who signed her for an album deal. The album Symphony of Love (1978) included the title track, "Dancin' with the Lights Down Low", "This is Something New to Me", "The Day They Got Disco in Brazil", "Do It" and "Something Made of Love".

Also in 1978, Brown appeared in the American film Superman, as the non-speaking eighth reporter in a scene following the first Superman spotting.

In need of a new producer in the early 1980s, Brown crossed the paths of Ian Levine and Fiachra Trench in 1983. Together with Record Shack Records, they created the album Manpower, a Hi-NRG release. The first single released from the album, "So Many Men – So Little Time" reached No. 88 on the UK Singles Chart on 11 June 1983. and peaked at number No. 2 on the club chart.

In the two years following Manpower, Brown appeared in stage productions of Only in America, the Leiber and Stoller Musical; The Best Little Whorehouse in Texas and One Mo' Time, as well as in numerous international clubs, but did not release any more albums until 1985. Close to Perfection (also produced by Levine and Trench) could not compete with her first success. The album featured two US dance radio and dance chart hits, with "Black Leather" and "Close to Perfection ", the latter of which gave her her highest UK Singles Chart placing (#63) for seven weeks.

In 1986, Brown filled in for The Three Degrees singer Helen Scott while Scott was pregnant. Brown helped the Degrees as they had a single called "This Is the House" to promote around Europe.

Later songs include "On the Radio", "Footprints in the Sand" and "This Time It's Real", all with Nightmare Records.

In 1989, Brown was seen as Jill in the second episode of the fourth series, "Accidents Happen", of the British show Casualty.

== The 1990s ==
In 1990, Brown released the songs "I Was Strong (My Moment)" and "Which Way Is Up" on Hansa. In 1995, she starred as the Housekeeper in Solomon and Sheba, with Halle Berry. Also in 1995, she played Sgt. Patton in French Kiss, with Meg Ryan and Kevin Kline. She can be heard on the London cast recordings of Elegies for Angels, Punks and Raging Queens (1993) and Fame (1995) (as Miss Sherman, the English teacher).

== 2000 to present ==
Brown played the Negro Woman in the 2001 play A Streetcar Named Desire at the Royal National Theatre (Lyttelton), in London, directed by Trevor Nunn and starring Glenn Close as Blanche DuBois.

She also appeared in the 2001 film Wit, where she has a brief exchange with Emma Thompson (who plays Vivian Bearing), as the second technician.

In 2004, Brown appeared as Idella in the London production of Purlie at the Bridewell Theatre in London (a role originally played by Helen Martin, from the American sitcom 227). Miquel Brown: The Lady, Her Loves and Her Lord was presented at the Bullion Room Theatre in London in 2005.

In 2005, Brown appeared as Chloe the old maid in An American Haunting with Sissy Spacek. The following year, 2006, she co-starred alongside Robert Ashe in the drama film 9/11: The Twin Towers.

In 2006, Brown appeared in the movie London Successor as Lolo. In 2007, she starred in the original London production of Menopause The Musical. In March 2008, Brown was seen when her daughter Sinitta appeared on UK's Celebrity Wife Swap, swapping partners with ex-Coronation Street actor Bruce Jones. In 2008, she appeared in the film How To Lose Friends & Alienate People as Harding's assistant, alongside Jeff Bridges.

She starred in the movie Fantastic Beasts and Where to Find Them, which was released in 2016, as Executioner 2.

== Discography ==
=== Albums ===
- Symphony of Love (1978)
- Manpower (Record Shack Records, 1983)
- Close to Perfection (Record Shack Records, 1985)
- The Best of Miquel Brown (Hot Productions, 1991)

=== Singles ===
| Year | Single | Peak chart positions | | |
| Year | Single | US Dance | AUS | UK |
|---|---|---|---|---|
| 1977 | "First Time Round" | — | — | — |
| 1978 | "Symphony of Love" | 28 | — | — |
| 1978 | "Dancin' with the Lights Down Low" | 28 | — | — |
| 1983 | "Beeline" | 44 | — | — |
| 1983 | "So Many Men, So Little Time" | 2 | 94 | 88 |
| 1983 | "He's a Saint, He's a Sinner" | 29 | — | 68 |
| 1985 | "Close to Perfection" | — | — | 63 |
| 1985 | "Black Leather" | — | — | 85 |
| 1985 | "On the Radio" | — | — | — |
| 1985 | "One Hundred Percent" | — | — | — |
| 1986 | "Footprints in the Sand" | — | — | — |
| 1990 | "This Time It's Real" | — | — | — |
| 1997 | "It's a Sin" | — | — | — |
"—" denotes releases that did not chart or were not released in that territory.
