= Problematic (song) =

Single by Five Star
- B-side: "Big Funk"
- Released: 30 September 1983
- Genre: Pop
- Length: 3:25
- Label: Tent
- Songwriters: J.G. Hargreaves, A. Ajai-Ajagbe
- Producers: Geoff Calver, Buster Pearson

Five Star singles chronology
"Problematic" (1983)	"Hide and Seek" (1984)

"Problematic" is the name of Five Star's first single, released 30 September 1983.

The song was performed on BBC TV's Pebble Mill at One show, which brought the band to public attention. According to Five Star's father/manager, Buster Pearson, RCA records were on the phone offering the band a record contract before the end of their performance.

Five Star were asked to perform "Problematic" on the show as that particular edition was focusing on unemployment, trying to find work, and the problems that come with it. The song was simply about a young girl leaving school, trying to find work.

Although credited to Five Star, the b-side "Big Funk" is an instrumental track written, arranged and produced by Buster Pearson with no involvement from the band members. He had already released the track as a single in 1973 credited to the Buster Pearson Band.

"Problematic" failed to chart in the UK.

7” Single:

1. Problematic

2. Big Funk

12” Single:

1. Problematic (Extended Version)

2. Problematic

3. Big Funk

The 12" single and a picture disc version of the 7" single were re-pressed by the Five Star Fan Club in 1989 and sold to members.

The 7" and 12" versions of "Problematic" were released as digital downloads on 18 July 2011.
