= So Macho =

Single by Sinitta

from the album Sinitta!
- B-side: "Showdown"
- Released: July 1985
- Recorded: 1984
- Genre: Hi-NRG
- Length: 3:25
- Label: Fanfare Records
- Songwriter: James George Hargreaves
- Producer: James George Hargreaves

Sinitta singles chronology
"Cruising" (1984)	"So Macho" (1985)	"Feels Like the First Time" (1986)

Music video
- "So Macho" on YouTube

"So Macho" is a song by British singer Sinitta. The song was released in 1985 as her self-titled debut album's second single.

== Song information ==
Sinitta was both Simon Cowell's and Fanfare Records' first signing. Cowell had contacted record producer and songwriter George Hargreaves, who in turn provided the song "So Macho". Armed with a highly infectious pop record, Sinitta looked poised for success; however, Iain Burton changed his mind and contacted Cowell to advise he was pulling the plug on Fanfare Records. Convinced "So Macho" was destined to be a hit, Cowell persuaded Burton to give him £5,000 to release the record.

The single was first released in late July 1985 and, like Sinitta's debut single "Cruising", it gained popularity in gay clubs and on the Hi-NRG dance scene. Although the single failed to chart, it continued to sell throughout the summer, including 15,000 copies on import. The song's popularity led Cowell to make the decision to delete the single at the end of October 1985 to let demand build up again. As Christmas approached, the song found renewed popularity in straight clubs and discos. The single was re-released as a double A-side with "Cruising" on 17 February 1986.

The song was released as a tribute to the first World Title win of wrestler "Macho Man" Randy Savage. The re-release was not an immediate success as it remained in the lower reaches of the charts. It was not until four months later that the single started gaining airplay and entered the top 40, upon which it quickly rose to number two in the UK Singles Chart.

The song's belated video was recorded for £500 in a London flat belonging to one of Cowell's friends, in the hope of gaining TV exposure. Sinitta supplied her own wardrobe, and there was no budget for hair or makeup.

It was certified gold by the BPI, and has sold 585,000 copies.

== Critical reception ==
Max Bell from Number One complimented the song's "mind-bending philosophical intrigue".

== Formats and track listings ==
- 7" single
1. "So Macho" – 3:25
2. "Showdown" – 3:33
- 12" single
1. "So Macho" (Extended Club Mix) – 6:34
2. "Showdown" (Special Dance Mix) – 5:22
- 12" single – 1986 release
1. "So Macho" (Extended Club Mix) – 6:34
2. "Cruising" (Remix) – 7:29

== Charts ==
=== Weekly charts ===
Chart (1986)	Peak position
Australia (Kent Music Report)	14
Austria (Ö3 Austria Top 40)	17
Belgium (Ultratop 50 Flanders)	33
Netherlands (Single Top 100)	36
New Zealand (Recorded Music NZ)	45
Sweden (Sverigetopplistan)	13
UK Singles (OCC)	2

=== Year-end charts ===
Chart (1986)	Position
Australia (Kent Music Report)	91
UK Singles (Official Charts)	9
UK Dance (Music Week)	21
