= Feels Like the First Time (Sinitta song) =

Single by Sinitta

from the album Sinitta!
- Released: April 1986
- Recorded: 1986
- Genre: Pop
- Length: 3:45
- Label: Fanfare Records
- Songwriter: James George Hargreaves
- Producer: James George Hargreaves

Sinitta singles chronology
"So Macho" (1985)	"Feels Like the First Time" (1986)	"Toy Boy" (1987)

"Feels Like the First Time" is a song by British singer Sinitta. The song was released in 1986 as her self-titled debut album's third single. The song performed poorly, peaking at number 45 in the UK in August 1986. It spent 5 weeks on the chart, whereas, in contrast, "So Macho" the album's second single had been on the UK chart for 28 weeks in 1986, peaking at number 2.

== Critical reception ==
In a review published in Smash Hits, Gary and Martin Kemp of the Spandau Ballet band were critical of "Feels Like the First Time", stating they "hate[d] this sort of record" as they considered it tasteless and a "pure production-line soul" which "[took] the human element out"; however, they stated that "So Macho" was "worse".

== Track listings ==
- 7" single
1. "Feels Like the First Time" - 3:45
2. "Feels Like the First Time" (Instrumental Dub Mix) - 3:45
- 12" single
1. "Feels Like the First Time" (Special Extended Club Mix) - 6:41
2. "Feels Like the First Time" (Instrumental Dub Mix) - 6:26

== Charts ==
Chart (1986)	Peak position
UK Singles Charts	45
US Hot Crossover 30 (Billboard)	25
U.S. Billboard Hot Black Singles	63
U.S. Billboard Hot Dance Music/Maxi-Singles Sales	7
U.S. Billboard Hot Dance Club Play	4
