= I Don't Believe in Miracles (Sinitta song) =

"I Don't Believe In Miracles"
- Merlin's Magical Mix cover

Single by Sinitta

from the album Wicked
- Released: 14 September 1988
- Recorded: 1987
- Genre: Dance-pop
- Length: 3:28
- Label: Fanfare Records
- Songwriter: Stock Aitken Waterman
- Producer: Stock Aitken Waterman

Sinitta singles chronology
"Cross My Broken Heart" (1988)	"I Don't Believe In Miracles" (1988)	"Right Back Where We Started From" (1989)

Music video
- "I Don't Believe in Miracles" on YouTube

"I Don't Believe In Miracles" is a song by British singer Sinitta, released in September 1988 by Fanfare Records as the first single from her second album, Wicked (1989). The song was written and produced by Stock Aitken Waterman, and was a top 30 hit in UK and Ireland. It was also her last single produced by Stock Aitken Waterman, as after this release, Sinitta moved away from working directly with them although she continued to record at PWL under the direction of mixmasters Pete Hammond, Phil Harding and Ian Curnow.

== Background and writing ==
Sinitta disliked the song upon first hearing it, and ask not to record it, feeling its negative sentiment flew in the face of her upbeat stage persona. She also felt the lyric was at odds with her own spiritual beliefs, as she "does believe in miracles". However, noting that the song is a strong fan favourite, the singer now includes it in her live setlist. The track includes elements strongly reminiscent of the Third Movement of Symphony No. 5 by Finnish composer Jean Sibelius.

== Critical reception ==
In her review of the song, Sarah Champion from NME commented, "Neither do I." David Gilles stated in Record Mirror that "I Don't Believe in Miracles" "sounded like quite a good SAW single", after noting Sinitta's almost full nudity on the single cover. In 2019, James Masterton described it as "a gloriously anthemic four minutes of Hi-NRG pop which sounded appealing enough on the radio but like the greatest record ever made when pumped through speakers at the roller disco" and added that in spite of its poor chart performance, it remained "in pure pop terms another all-out classic".

== Chart performance ==
In the UK, "I Don't Believe in Miracles" debuted at number 42 on the chart edition of 24 September 1988, peaked at number 22 in its fifth week, and remained on the chart for eight weeks. Similarly, it was a top-25 hit in Ireland where it peaked at number 21 and charted for three weeks. It was a top-two hit in Finland, and a top-15 hit in Spain and Luxembourg. On the pan-Eurochart Hot 100 established by the Music & Media magazine, it debuted at number 83 on 15 October 1988, reached number 58 two weeks later, and fell off the chart after five weeks.

== Formats and track listings ==
- 7" single
1. "I Don't Believe In Miracles" - 3:28
2. "I Don't Believe In Miracles" (Instrumental) - 3:28
- 12" single
1. "I Don't Believe In Miracles" (Merlin's Magical Mix) - 6:15
2. "I Don't Believe In Miracles" (Instrumental Club Mix) - 4:53

== Charts ==
1988 weekly chart performance for "I Don't Believe in Miracles"
Chart (1988)	Peak position
Europe (Eurochart Hot 100)	58
Finland (Suomen virallinen lista)	2
Ireland (IRMA)	21
Luxembourg (Radio Luxembourg)	15
Spain (AFYVE)	12
UK Singles (OCC)	22
UK Dance (Music Week)	19
