= Love on a Mountain Top =

1968 song by Robert Knight

"Love on a Mountain Top" is a 1968 song by singer Robert Knight. The song was written by Buzz Cason and Mac Gayden, who also penned "Everlasting Love". However, it only charted regionally in the Philadelphia and Pittsburgh area. Re-discovered by the UK's Northern soul scene, it got airplay by DJs in late 1973, causing a UK re-release of the record, where the song eventually entered the UK Singles Chart and peaked at number 10 in January 1974.

== Sinitta version ==
"Love on a Mountain Top"

Single by Sinitta

from the album Wicked
- B-side: "Don't Tell Me Not to Cry"
- Released: October 1989
- Recorded: 1988
- Genre: Pop
- Length: 3:25
- Label: Fanfare Records
- Songwriters: Buzz Cason, Mac Gayden
- Producers: Phil Harding, Ian Curnow

Sinitta singles chronology
"Right Back Where We Started From" (1989)	"Love on a Mountain Top" (1989)	"Hitchin' a Ride" (1990)

A cover version of "Love on a Mountain Top" by American-British pop singer Sinitta appeared in 1989, produced by Phil Harding and Ian Curnow. It was released as the third single from Sinitta's second album, Wicked (1988). Her version of the song reached number 20 on the UK Singles Chart, and number 81 in Australia on the ARIA chart.

=== Critical reception ===
Bill Coleman from Billboard stated that the "hi-NRG/crossover diva is back with a predictable but nonetheless charming track from her new album." Richard Lowe from Smash Hits felt the 12" "sounds uncannily like "Numero Uno" by Starlight, and is "yet another ropy version of a fantastic old song".

=== Formats and track listings ===
- CD single
1. "Love on a Mountain Top" – 3:25
2. "Love on a Mountain Top" (An Everlasting Knight Mix) – 7:45
3. "Love on a Mountain Top" (Extended Club Mix) – 5:48
4. "Love on a Mountain Top" (Bonus Beats Mix) – 4:16
5. "Don't Tell Me Not to Cry" (Extended Version) – 5:02
- 7" single
1. "Love on a Mountain Top" – 3:25
2. "Don't Tell Me Not to Cry" – 3:55
- 12" single
1. "Love on a Mountain Top" (An Everlasting Knight Mix) – 7:45
2. "Don't Tell Me Not to Cry" (Extended Version) – 5:02

=== Charts ===
Chart (1989)	Peak position
Australia (ARIA)	81
Europe (Eurochart Hot 100)	65
Finland (Suomen virallinen lista)	9
Ireland (IRMA)	18
Luxembourg (Radio Luxembourg)	17
UK Singles (OCC)	20
