= Cross My Broken Heart (Sinitta song) =

1988 single by Sinitta

Single by Sinitta

from the album Sinitta!
- B-side: "Toy Boy (remix)"
- Released: February 1988
- Recorded: 1987
- Genre: Dance-pop; synth-pop
- Length: 3:43 (7” version); 6:50; 3:51 (original mix)
- Label: Fanfare Records
- Songwriter: Stock Aitken Waterman
- Producer: Stock Aitken Waterman

Sinitta singles chronology
"GTO" (1987)	"Cross My Broken Heart" (1988)	"I Don't Believe In Miracles" (1988)

"Cross My Broken Heart" is a song by American-British pop singer Sinitta. It was released in March 1988 by Fanfare Records as the sixth and final single from her self-titled debut album (1987). The song was written and produced by Stock Aitken Waterman, and was successful in the UK where it was a top 10 hit, peaking at number six. It was certified silver by the BPI. The B-side contains a remix of her 1987 hit, "Toy Boy".

== Critical reception ==
Bill Coleman from Billboard described "Cross My Broken Heart" as "an annoyingly catchy hi-NRG-inspired track in the Bananarama mold". James Hamilton from Record Mirror wrote in his dance column, "Plaintively pitched tudding 116 1/2bpm canterer with a sing-song chorus and rather more melody than usual". In a review published in Smash Hits, Ro Newton described the song as "a tale of woe and despair" in which "another boyfriend bites the dust". Retrospectively, in a 2015 review of the parent album, the Pop Rescue website considered "Cross My Broken Heart" as being "the best Sinitta track musically, vocally and lyrically", with "some great 80s vocal samples, some rich vocal harmonies, a stomping beat, and a pretty cool video". According to James Masterton in 2019, "Cross My Broken Heart" has "a sing-song chorus that sounded for all the world like a playground tease" and considered it "a fine example of throwaway yet sometimes addictive pop music".

== Chart performance ==
In the UK, "Cross My Broken Heart" debuted at number 30 on 19 March 1988, climbed to number 14 the next week, then peaked at number six for consecutive three weeks; it fell off the chart after nine weeks and was certified silver by the British Phonographic Industry. It also reached number seven on the Irish Singles Chart where it charted for five weeks. Ireland, UK and Luxembourg were the only countries in which the single peaked within the top ten; it was a top-15 hit in Spain and Finland, a top-20 hit in West Germany and Switzerland, missed the top 30 by two places in the Flanders part of Belgium, and stalled at number 44 in the Netherlands. On the overall Eurochart Hot 100 compiled by the Music & Media magazine, it debuted at number 93 on 26 March 1988, attained number 16 in its fifth week and totaled ten weeks on the chart. It peaked at number 25 on the European Airplay Top 50 on which it appeared for five weeks. Outside Europe, "Cross My Broken Heart" reached number 26 on the US Hot Dance Club Play, and met with less success in New Zealand and Australia, peaking at numbers 39 and 54, respectively.

== Formats and track listings ==
- 7" single
1. "Cross My Broken Heart" (Remix) – 3:43
2. "Toy Boy" (7" Remix) – 4:20
- 12" single
1. "Cross My Broken Heart" (Cupid's Avenging Mix) – 6:50
2. "Toy Boy" (12" Remix) – 5:08
3. "Cross My Broken Heart" (Instrumental) – 3:43
- 12" remix
1. "Cross My Broken Heart" (Extra Pulsing Mix) – 6:46
2. "Toy Boy" (12" Remix) – 5:08
3. "Cross My Broken Heart" (Instrumental) – 3:43

== Charts ==
=== Weekly charts ===
Weekly chart performance for "Cross My Broken Heart"
Chart (1988)	Peak position
Australia (ARIA)	56
Belgium (Ultratop 50 Flanders)	32
Europe (Eurochart Hot 100)	16
Europe (European Airplay Top 50)	25
Finland (Suomen virallinen lista)	14
Ireland (IRMA)	7
Luxembourg (Radio Luxembourg)	6
New Zealand (Recorded Music NZ)	39
Netherlands (Single Top 100)	44
Spain (AFYVE)	12
Switzerland (Schweizer Hitparade)	19
UK Singles (OCC)	6
UK Dance (Music Week)	8
US Hot Dance Club Play (Billboard)	26
West Germany (GfK)	18

=== Year-end charts ===
1988 year-end chart performance for "Cross My Broken Heart"
Chart (1988)	Position
UK Singles (OCC)	97

== Certifications ==
Certifications for "Cross My Broken Heart"
Region	Certification	Certified units/sales
United Kingdom (BPI)	Silver	250,000^{^}
^{^} Shipments figures based on certification alone.
