= GTO (Sinitta song) =

Single by Sinitta

from the album Sinitta!
- Released: November 1987
- Recorded: 1987
- Genre: Synthpop, dance-pop
- Length: 3:30
- Label: Fanfare Records
- Songwriter: Stock Aitken Waterman
- Producer: Stock Aitken Waterman

Sinitta singles chronology
"Toy Boy" (1987)	"GTO" (1987)	"Cross My Broken Heart" (1988)

Music video
- "GTO" on YouTube

"GTO" is a song by British singer Sinitta. Produced by Stock Aitken Waterman, it was released in 1987 as the fifth single from her self-titled debut album. The song is about a girl whose boyfriend cares more about his car, in the music video a Ferrari 250 GTO, than her. The song was a top-20 hit in the UK, peaking at number 15, and reached the top ten in several European countries.

== Background and writing ==
According to James Masterton, "GTO" is one of "sparky pop records with tabloid-friendly subjects", its subject being a man's love for his car GTO, while the singer, with whom he is in love, is "bemoaning her chances of ever replacing it in his affections". Sinitta expressed her extreme dissatisfaction with the subject matter of the song when first presented with the idea by record label boss, Simon Cowell. Fearing that the title would mean nothing to her core audience of gay men and younger record buyers, Sinitta unsuccessfully begged producers Stock Aitken Waterman to retitle the track before recording. By contrast, she expressed greater satisfaction with the song's video, which had a substantially bigger budget than her prior efforts, boasting that the clip's solo ballet sequence was one of her most enjoyable pop star memories. Her opinion of the song greatly improved due to its positive reception by fans.

== Critical reception ==
=== Initial response ===
Jerry Smith of British magazine Music Week awarded "GTO" the "mindless dance single of the week", but predicted its success on the dance chart. When reviewing the Sinitta! album, Richard Lowe of Smash Hits called "GTO", along with "Toy Boy", "splendidly trashy classics".

=== Impact and legacy ===
In 2014, Matt Dunn of WhatCulture ranked the song at number 9 in his "15 unforgettable Stock Aitken Waterman singles" list, describing it as a "cracker" and a "gem", but lamented about Sinitta's clothing he found horrible, stating that "thankfully her songs were more often than not a great deal better than her wardrobe". In a 2015 review of the parent album, the Pop Rescue website considered "GTO" "a fun track" due to its lyrics and car revving sounds. In 2021, British magazine Classic Pop ranked the song number 37 in their list of "Top 40 Stock Aitken Waterman songs", calling it a "SAW classic", praised the single for "the YMCA-esque male choir booming out in full chant mode, SAW's slick pop production and Sinitta's bubbly charm", and concluded that it is "nothing if not a whole lot of fun".

== Chart performance ==
In the UK, "GTO" debuted at number 48 on 12 December 1987, reached number 15 five weeks later and counted ten weeks on the chart. It also reached number 13 on the Irish Singles Chart and charted for four weeks. In Continental Europe, the song peaked at number three in Spain, which was its highest position on any chart, and was also a top-ten hit in Finland and Norway, attaining numbers eight and nine, respectively; in the latter country, "GTO" was Sinitta's only charting single. In addition, it missed the top ten by one place in Switzerland and by two places in Luxembourg, was a moderate hit in West Germany where it culminated at number 31 and was present on the chart for eight weeks, and peaked at number 42 in the Netherlands. On the overall Eurochart Hot 100 compiled by the Music & Media magazine, it debuted at number 92 on 26 December 1987, culminated at number 25 in its third week and totaled nine weeks on the chart. Outside Europe, "GTO" met with a limited success in New Zealand and Australia, peaking at numbers 37 et 62, respectively.

== Formats and track listings ==
- 7" single
1. "GTO" - 3:30
2. "GTO" (Instrumental) - 3:30
- 12" single
1. "GTO" (Modina's Red Roaring Mix) - 7:30
2. "GTO" - 3:30
3. "GTO" (Instrumental) - 3:30

== Charts ==
Weekly chart performance for "GTO"
Chart (1987–1988)	Peak position
Australia (ARIA Singles Chart)	62
Europe (Eurochart Hot 100)	25
Finland (Suomen virallinen lista)	8
Ireland (IRMA)	13
Luxembourg (Radio Luxembourg)	12
New Zealand (Recorded Music NZ)	37
Netherlands (Single Top 100)	42
Norway (VG-lista)	9
Spain (AFYVE)	3
Switzerland (Schweizer Hitparade)	11
UK Singles (OCC)	15
UK Dance (Music Week)	12
West Germany (GfK)	31
