= Hitchin' a Ride (Vanity Fare song) =

1969 single by Vanity Fare

Single by Vanity Fare

from the album Early in the Morning
- B-side: "Man Child"
- Released: 7 November 1969 (UK); March 1970 (US)
- Recorded: 1969
- Genre: Rock; pop
- Length: 2:44 (Single Version); 3:08 (Album Version)
- Label: Page One
- Songwriters: Mitch Murray; Peter Callander
- Producers: Des Champ; Roger Easterby

Vanity Fare singles chronology
"Early in the Morning" (1969)	"Hitchin' a Ride" (1969)	"Come Tomorrow" (1970)

"Hitchin' a Ride" is a song written by Mitch Murray and Peter Callander issued as a single by the English pop/rock band Vanity Fare in late 1969. It reached number 16 on the UK Singles Chart in February 1970 but was a bigger hit in the United States, reaching number 5 on the Hot 100 on June 27, 1970. Billboard ranked the record as the number 14 song of 1970. In Chicago, the record achieved even greater heights, topping the WCFL Big 10 Countdown on 18–25 May 1970, ranking #4 for all of 1970 and ranking #12 on rival WLS Radio 89 Hit Parade on 1-8 June 1970, ranking #10 for all of 1970. "Hitchin' a Ride" sold a million copies in the United States alone, and it became a gold record.

== Background ==
The song is about a young man who is attempting to hitchhike since he has no money. The song is noted for its two recorders first heard in the introduction as well as in the sections between the choruses and the verses.

The song is also noted for its instrumental section, featuring an electric piano, that plays a bass line in repetition, which is accompanied by the piano's upper register, bass, drums, and guitar, which is later heard before the song's fade. The U.S. single edit shortens the ending by eliminating the final repeated lines of "ride, ride" before the song fades out.

== Chart performance (Vanity Fare) ==
=== Weekly charts ===
Chart (1969–1970)	Peak position
Australia (Kent Music Report)	24
Canada RPM Top Singles	3
New Zealand	16
South Africa (Springbok)	2
UK	16
US Billboard Hot 100	5
US Billboard Easy Listening	22
US Cash Box Top 100	4

=== Year-end charts ===
Chart (1970)	Rank
Canada	49
US Billboard Hot 100	14

== Certifications ==
Region	Certification	Certified units/sales
United States (RIAA)	Gold	1,000,000^{^}
^{^} Shipments figures based on certification alone.

== Sinitta version ==
"Hitchin' a Ride"

Single by Sinitta

from the album Wicked
- B-side: "I'm On My Way"
- Released: April 1990
- Recorded: 1989
- Genre: Synthpop
- Length: 3:42
- Label: Fanfare Records
- Songwriters: Mitch Murray; Peter Callander
- Producer: Ralf Rene Maue

Sinitta singles chronology
"Love on a Mountain Top" (1989)	"Hitchin' a Ride" (1990)	"Love and Affection" (1990)

Music video
- "Hitchin' a Ride" on YouTube

"Hitchin' a Ride" was covered by British singer Sinitta. It was released in 1990 as the fifth and final single from her second album Wicked (1989). The song was produced by Ralf Rene Maue. The B-side contains a previously unreleased song "I'm On My Way". This single reached number 24 in the UK, number 19 in Ireland, and number 131 in Australia.

Sinitta's version of the song interpolates the "beep-beep, yeah" motif from The Beatles song "Drive My Car".

=== Critical reception ===
Bill Coleman from Billboard wrote, "U.K. siren continues her bid for American stardom with a peppy, HiNRG cover of the Vanity Fare nugget." David Giles from Music Week stated that the song has been "given an ultra-glossy Hi-NRG sheen". He added that "it sounds a little dated, reminiscent perhaps of Kelly Marie's "Feels Like I'm in Love", but should still clear the shelves."

=== Formats and track listings ===
7" single

1. "Hitchin' a Ride" – 3:42
2. "I'm on My Way" – 3:52

12" single

1. "Hitchin' a Ride" (extended version) – 6:35
2. "I'm on My Way" – 3:52

CD single

1. "Hitchin' a Ride" (extended version) – 6:35
2. "I'm on My Way" – 3:52
3. "Hitchin' a Ride" – 3:42

=== Charts ===
Chart (1990)	Peak position
Australia (ARIA)	131
Europe (Eurochart Hot 100)	54
Ireland (IRMA)	19
Luxembourg (Radio Luxembourg)	17
UK Singles (OCC)	24

== Other cover versions ==
- A country music version of the song was released by singer Jack Reno and reached #12 on the U.S. country chart in 1971.
- British group Paper Lace adapted their 1974 version as "Hitchin' a Ride '74", reaching #55 on the official UK "Breakers List" chart and #16 in New Zealand.
- A 1986 recording by The Replacements is featured on the 2017 live album For Sale: Live at Maxwell's 1986. The 2025 deluxe re-issue of their "Let It Be" album includes a live version recorded at the Cubby Bear in Chicago in 1984 (the recording quality is sub-standard).

== See also ==
- Hitch hike (dance)
