= George Hargreaves (politician) =

British Pentecostal minister and politician

Leader of the Christian Party
- In office 2004–2014
- Preceded by: Party founded
- Succeeded by: Jeff Green

Personal details
- Born: July 14, 1957 (age 69) London, England
- Party: Christian Party (2004–2014)
- Other political affiliations: Christian Peoples Alliance (2002–2004); Referendum Party (1997)

James George Hargreaves (born 14 July 1957), known as George Hargreaves or J. G. Hargreaves, is an English religious minister, community worker, political campaigner, former politician, former music producer, songwriter, TV producer and currently working as a Christian missionary.

He was leader of the Christian Party, having founded it in 2004.

== Early life ==
Of Trinidadian ancestry, Hargreaves grew up in Islington. He is fifth out seven siblings. His life was saved by a firefighter who rescued him from his burning house when he was a child. He was educated at King's College London, the University of Oxford, and at the University of St Andrews.

== Musical career ==
Hargreaves attended Woolverstone Hall, a boarding school owned by the Inner London Education Authority. While still at school, he formed a band named Snapp with Tony Ajai-Ajagbe and three other school friends. In 1973 the band were signed by M&W Music Productions, which was owned by Dave Myers and John Worsley, writers of the 1971 UK Eurovision Song Contest entry "Jack in The Box" sung by Clodagh Rodgers. A single written by Myers and Worsley called "Cheat, Cheat" was released in 1974 on Cube Records.

Hargreaves and Ajai-Ajagbe developed their own songwriting skills and in 1977 they signed as Motown's Jobete Music's only UK based songwriting team.

Hargreaves and Ajai-Ajagbe soon moved into producing. In the 1980s, Hargreaves and Ajai-Ajagbe negotiated a label deal with Michael Levy's Magnet Records. Their label, Midas Records, was the first to release recordings by Sinitta, which Hargreaves and Ajai-Ajagbe wrote and produced. They were also the first to record Yazz as a member of the pop group The Biz.

Hargreaves and Ajai-Ajagbe wrote the 1983 season theme tune for the BBC1 daily magazine show Pebble Mill at One and the theme tune for the BBC2 show 655 Special hosted by David Soul and Sally James. Hargreaves and Ajai-Ajagbe also wrote the first single for Five Star. called "Problematic". Hargreaves used his influence with the music producer of Pebble Mill at One to get Five Star on the show, which launched their career. The songwriting partnership between Hargreaves and Ajai-Ajagbe ended in 1983, shortly after they completed Sinitta's second single "Never Too Late". Tony Ajai-Ajagbe died of AIDS in 1995.

Hargreaves continued to write songs on his own. He wrote and produced Simon Cowell's first hit with Sinitta, "So Macho". which went to number 2 twice on the UK chart in 1986. He told Scotland on Sunday that "So Macho" was intended "... for women to dance round their handbags to and for the gay scene to go mad to on poppers" and that "I was never gay, but I had a lot of lovely friends in the gay scene." Cowell went on to describe Hargreaves as a "well known songwriter" in his autobiography I Don't Mean to be Rude, but....

Hargreaves topped the chart in Iceland with an Icelandic version of a Christmas song originally recorded, but never released, by Sinitta (with Simon Cowell singing Santa "Ho ho hoes" in the background vocals). The song "I Won't Be Lonely This Christmas" became "Heima Um Jólin" and was sung by Helga Möller.

Hargreaves' first Top 50 chart hit was "Feels Like The First Time", which reached number 45 on the UK chart in August 1986, but faded fast when "So Macho" entered the top 50 some seven month after its initial release. "Feels Like the First Time" was however Sinitta's biggest hit in the US, going top ten in the Billboard Hot Dance Music/Maxi-Singles Sales chart. The song and the production of "Feels Like the First Time" was greatly influenced by Madonna's producer Steve Bray (writer and producer of Madonna's hit "Into the Groove". Bray also co-wrote and produced the song "Baby Love" with the US singer Regina who was signed to Hargreaves' US production company West 78th Street Records. Hargreaves worked on the mix of the "Baby Love" record and gained an insight into how to make 'Madonna sounding songs' and applied his new knowledge to Sinitta with "Feels Like the First Time". Regina's "Baby Love" reached number 9 on the US chart and was later covered by Dannii Minogue.

== Christian ministry and community work ==
In 1990 Hargreaves was ordained as a Pentecostal minister under the auspices of the International Ministerial Council of Great Britain and served as an associate pastor at Edmonton Temple church in North East London. He taught New Testament Greek at Edmonton Temple's 'Word of Life' bible college.

He studied for a Diploma in Christian Ministry at the International Bible Institute of London, where he gained a Distinction. He then obtained a BA Honours degree in Theology from London University's King's College and a Post-graduate Diploma in Theology from Oxford University. He then went on to win the first Studentship Award for Oxford University's newly formed Centre for Christianity & Culture. The award funded his studies for a master's degree in Anthropology. As part of the conditions of the Studentship Award he also gave a series of lectures at the Centre for Christianity & Culture on the subject of the Black Majority Churches in Britain. He was also a member of the Black Theology in Britain group with Professor Robert Beckford and other black leading theologians. Hargreaves is an Associate of King's College (AKC).

In 1994 Hargreaves married Maxine Williams, the founder and pastor of Hephzibah Christian Centre in Hackney, and he joined his wife in Christian ministry as co-pastor of the church. Hargreaves, apart from pastoring the Hephzibah Christian Centre with his wife Maxine, was also deeply involved in community work in North East London and elsewhere.

Whilst studying at Oxford University from 1995-1997 Hargreaves served as an Associate Chaplain at Campsfield House Immigration Detention Centre.

He served as Hackney Council's strategic partnership representative for the Christian community in Hackney. He was also employed as faith community manager for Waltham Forest Council and played a major role in maintaining good community relations with the Muslim community in the borough in the aftermath of the 7 July 2005 London bombings.

In mid-1997, whilst working as a project worker for the charity Hackney Employment Link Project, Hargreaves made a successful bid to the European Union's European Social Fund for funding to launch the LEAP adult literacy programme in Hackney. As lead teacher for the programme he taught many adults how to read.

In 1998, again with European funding, Hargreaves launched the Hephzibah Intro-net Project, setting up two of the earliest cybercafes in London, one at Edmonton Green and the other at the New Deal Campus in Hackney. The project introduced unemployed young people to the Internet, website design and Wireless Application Protocol, which Hargreaves himself taught.

From 2001 to 2004 Hargreaves edited the CANDL Light newsletter for Barnardo's Church and Neighbourhood Development in London Project.

In 2004, Hargreaves and his wife, Maxine, founded the East London Christian Choir School in Hackney, an independent school which used the Accelerated Christian Education programme.

Hargreaves served as Chair of the Metropolitan Police Service's 'STOP & SEARCH Community Consultative Committee' under Assistant Commissioner Brian Paddick. The committee revised the Stop and Search protocol for the Metropolitan Police only to see their work disregarded when the police were given new Stop & Search powers under section 44 of the Terrorism Act 2000.

Hargreaves also served on the Metropolitan Police 'Operation Blunt' anti-knife crime committee and attempted to initiate a knife and gun bin programme in Waltham Forest and Hackney.

Hargreaves no longer pastors a church, instead he now travels the world as a missionary focusing on empowerment through the creative arts. He developed a stage play with Ugandan actors in Uganda for the 2017 Edinburgh Fringe Festival.

He has also been responsible for promoting Christian films in the UK and across Africa, including Black Nativity (2013), God's Not Dead (2014) and Selma (2014).

Hargreaves is a regular commentator on BBC1's Sunday Morning Live show and appears from time to time on other news and current affairs programmes.

== Political career ==
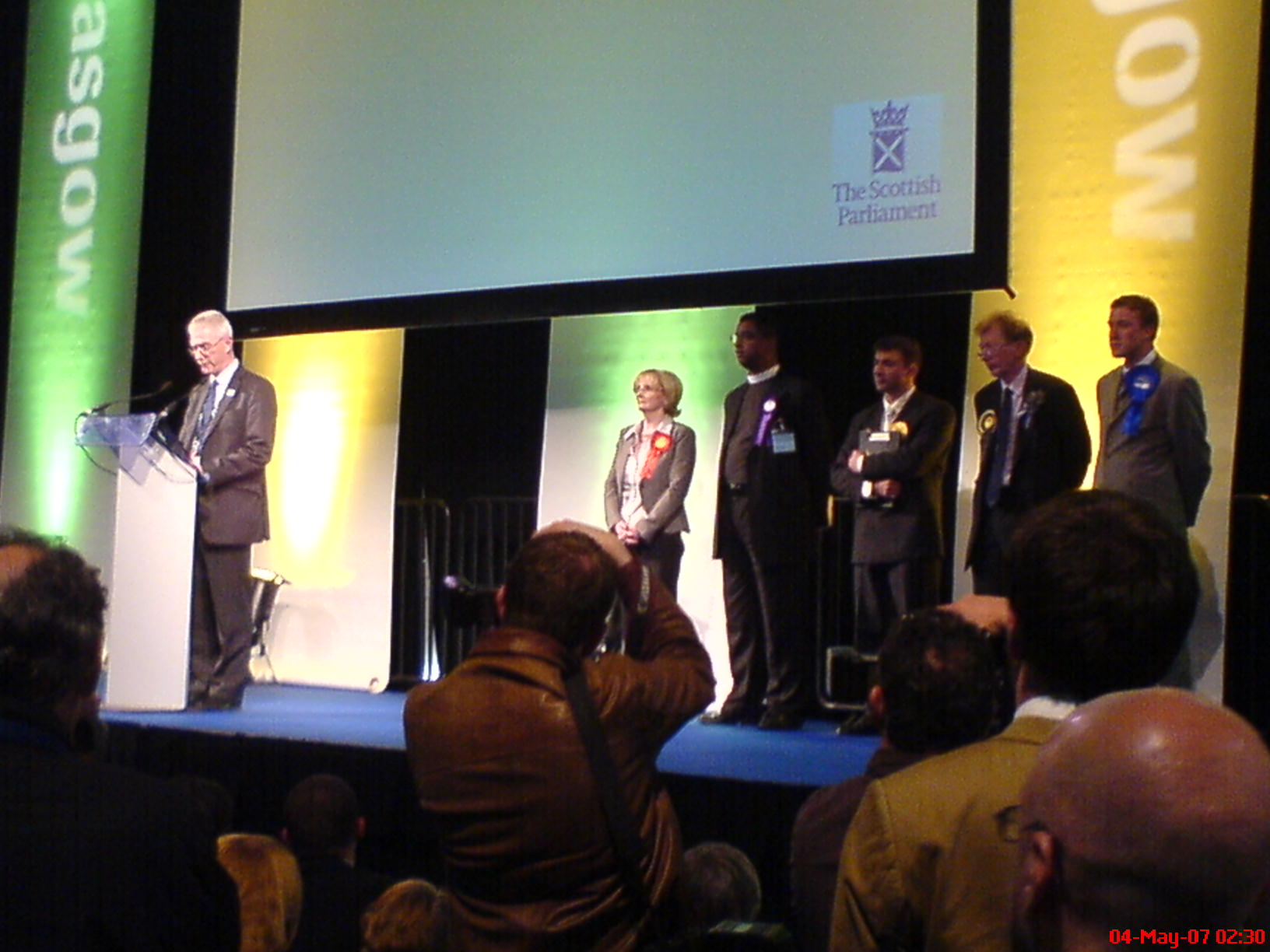
Hargreaves (2nd from left in candidates line-up) and other candidates who contested the Glasgow Baillieston constituency in the 2007 Scottish Parliament election

At the 1997 general election, Hargreaves stood as the Referendum Party candidate for Walthamstow. In 2002, he joined the Christian Peoples Alliance (CPA) and served as the party's campaigns officer and acting chair of its Hackney branch.

In 2004, he founded Operation Christian Vote as an alternative to the CPA. The party stood only in the Scottish region at the 2004 European Parliament election as Christian Peoples Alliances (CPA) were fielding no candidates in the region.

Hargreaves then stood for the party at the 2004 Birmingham Hodge Hill by-election and at the 2005 general election in Na h-Eileanan an Iar, where he took 7.6% of the votes cast and beat the Conservative Party candidate.

In 2006, Hargreaves renamed Operation Christian Vote the Christian Party (Proclaiming Christ's Lordship). The party was to be simply called the Christian Party, but the Electoral Commission objected, claiming that it might be confused with the Christian Democratic Party or the Christian Peoples Alliance; so the extra words "Proclaiming Christ's Lordship" were added.

In Scotland the short form, Scottish Christian Party, was permitted and Hargreaves stood under the name Scottish Christian Party in the 2006 Dunfermline and West Fife by-election, taking 1.2% of the vote.

In November 2006 Hargreaves personally funded the Employment Tribunals of nine Strathclyde Fire and Rescue Service firefighters who were suspended after refusing to distribute leaflets at a gay pride march. The case was settled out-of-court.

Hargreaves was also involved in protests against Jerry Springer: The Opera, claiming that "Jerry Springer proved the greatest rallying point for Christian activism in the past 10 years".

The Scottish Christian Party put up candidates in every region in the 2007 Scottish Parliament election. Hargreaves also founded the Welsh Christian Party to contest the 2007 National Assembly for Wales election. Hargreaves stood for the Christian Party at the 2008 Haltemprice and Howden by-election, where he asked the Haltemprice and Howden electorate to use their vote to demand a referendum on the European Union, which he believes to be "the greatest threat to our civil liberties".

In August 2008, Hargreaves fronted the Channel 4 programme Make Me a Christian.

He had planned to stand in Na h-Eileanan an Iar (UK Parliament constituency) in the 2010 general election, but withdrew his candidacy in February 2010 after his wife's cancer returned. However, he stood as a candidate for Barking in the 2010 general election and despite being terminally ill, his wife Maxine, stood as a candidate in Hackney. Maxine died of cancer in February 2011.

In February 2015, Simon Gilbert of the Coventry Telegraph published that UKIP had planned to select Hargreaves as its candidate for Coventry South in the 2015 general election. However, Hargreaves had never joined UKIP, despite being courted by them on several occasions, and no such agreement had ever been reached to stand in Coventry South.

In 2015, in recognition of his Christian ministry, community work and political leadership, Hargreaves was awarded an honorary doctorate in Christian Ministry from Excel University.

Hargreaves stood for the Transform Isle of Man party in the Douglas Central constituency in the 2026 Manx general election, coming in seventh place with 120 votes, ahead of party colleague Creena Mason.

=== Elections contested ===
UK Parliament elections

Date of election	Constituency	Party	Votes	%	Result
1997	Walthamstow	Referendum	1,139	2.8	4th of 4
2004	Birmingham Hodge Hill	Christian Vote	90	0.4	7th of 7
2005	Na h-Eileanan an Iar	Christian Vote	1,048	7.6	4th of 6
2006	Dunfermline and West Fife	Christian	411	1.2	6th of 9
2008	Haltemprice and Howden	Christian	76	0.3	16th of 26
2010	Barking	Christian	482	1.1	6th of 10

Scottish Parliament elections (Electoral Additional Region)

Date of election	Region	Party	Votes	%	Results	Notes
2007	Glasgow	Christian	2,991	1.4	Not elected	Multi-member region; party list
2011	Glasgow	Christian	1,501	0.7	Not elected	Multi-member region; party list

European Parliament elections

Date of election	Constituency	Party	Votes	%	Results	Notes
2004	Scotland	Christian Vote	21,056	1.7	Not-elected	Multi-member constituencies; party lists
2009	London	Christian	51,336	2.9	Not elected	Multi-member constituencies; party list

House of Keys elections

Date of election	Constituency	Party	Votes	%	Results	Notes
2026	Douglas Central	Transform	120	2.6	Not-elected	Multi-member constituencies
