= Let's Get Ready to Rhumble =

Single by PJ & Duncan

from the album Psyche
- Released: 11 July 1994
- Recorded: 1994
- Genre: Hip hop; dance-pop
- Length: 4:00
- Label: Telstar
- Songwriters: Nicky Graham; Deni Lew; Mike Olton
- Producer: Nicky Graham

PJ & Duncan singles chronology
"Why Me?" (1994)	"Let's Get Ready to Rhumble" (1994)	"If I Give You My Number" (1994)

Music video
- "Let's Get Ready to Rhumble" on YouTube

"Let's Get Ready to Rhumble" is a song by PJ & Duncan AKA, the performing name used by British duo Ant & Dec at the time. The song was released in the UK on 11 July 1994 by Telstar Records as the third single from their debut studio album, Psyche (1994). The song was written by Nicky Graham, Deni Lew and Mike Olton, and produced by Graham. It peaked at number nine on the UK Singles Chart in 1994, and was later #1 almost two decades after its original chart appearance. The song includes a repeatedly-used sample of boxing and wrestling announcer Michael Buffer saying his trademark catchphrase. “Rumble” was deliberately spelled as "rhumble" to avoid copyright problems, since Buffer had trademarked the phrase, and the chosen additional “h” was a homage to the rhumba dance. "Let's Get Ready to Rhumble" was nominated in the category for Best Single at the 1995 Smash Hits Awards.

The single was re-released in March 2013, with royalties from sales donated to the charity ChildLine. The song peaked at number one on the UK Singles Chart in its first week of new release, becoming their first ever single to reach that spot and gave DMG TV's Edsel label a number one. The song was performed on Ant & Dec's Saturday Night Takeaway. The single was re-released in February 2014.

== Critical reception ==
Pete Stanton from Smash Hits gave the song a score of three out of five, writing, "So the boys have made up their own dance move for this tune. Their best bet was to call the song 'Let's Get Ready to Crumble' and then they could have made everyone a really tasty rhubarb crumble. This is soft hip-hop rap with stacks of cheesy lyrics like this track's boomin' and partners in crime — we'll never do time. But their plan's so crazy it might work. PJ & Duncan are good blokes and the charts need them in a sort of throwaway-what-the-hell sort of way." Another Smash Hits editor, Mark Frith, stated, "When they're brilliant they come up with 'Let's Get Ready to Rhumble'."

== Chart performance ==
On 23 July 1994, the song entered the UK Singles Chart at number 18, it climbed seven places to number 11 in its second week and climbed to number 9 in its third week. After Ant & Dec performed the song on Saturday Night Takeaway on 23 March 2013, the song topped the UK Singles Chart on 31 March 2013, as predicted after charting at number one in the Midweek Chart Update on 27 March 2013.

== Live performances ==
"Let's Get Ready to Rhumble" was performed on BBC One's Top of the Pops and regularly featured on the ITV Saturday morning show Gimme 5 at the time of release.

Ant & Dec celebrated the 100th episode of CD:UK in 2000 by performing the song once again, years after retiring from the music industry, after a viewer vote where 86% requested it. In March 2013, Ant & Dec performed the song as the closing act for the "End of the Show Show" segment of their ITV show Ant & Dec's Saturday Night Takeaway at the end of a series of performances by The Big Reunion special invitees. In the segment, Blue, Atomic Kitten and Five also performed.

== Track listing ==
CD 1 (CDANT1)
No.	Title	Length
1.	"Let's Get Ready to Rhumble (100% Radio Mix)"	4:00
2.	"Exclusive: The PJ & Duncan Show - Part 1"	4:22
3.	"Let's Get Ready to Rhumble (Housey Housey Mix)"	4:26

CD 2 (CDDEC1)
No.	Title	Length
1.	"Let's Get Ready to Rhumble (100% Radio Mix)"	4:00
2.	"Exclusive: The PJ & Duncan Show - Part 2"	5:43
3.	"Let's Get Ready to Rhumble (Klassy Dub Mix)"	5:44

Cassette 1 (MCANT1)
No.	Title	Length
1.	"Let's Get Ready to Rhumble (100% Radio Mix)"	4:00
2.	"Exclusive: The PJ & Duncan Show - Part 1"	4:22

Cassette 2 (MCDEC1)
No.	Title	Length
1.	"Let's Get Ready to Rhumble (100% Radio Mix)"	4:00
2.	"Exclusive: The PJ & Duncan Show - Part 2"	5:43

Digital download
No.	Title	Length
1.	"Let's Get Ready to Rhumble (100% Radio Mix)"	4:00

No.	Title	Length
1.	"Let's Get Ready to Rhumble"	4:00
2.	"Why Me If Justfield"	5:00
3.	"Tonight I'm Free"	6:00
4.	"If I Give You My Number"	7:00
5.	"All We Wanna Do We Rap"	8:00
6.	"The Ballad of Bullseye"	9:00
7.	"Let's Get Ready to Rhumble - Karaoke Version"	1:00

== Personnel ==
- Vocals – PJ & Duncan/Ant & Dec
- Producers – Nicky Graham
- Lyrics – Nicky Graham, Deni Lew, Mike Olton
- Label: Telstar
- Max Headroom Ft MXHM

== Charts ==
=== Weekly charts ===
Chart (1994)	Peak position
Ireland (IRMA)	13
Israel (IBA)	14
UK Singles (OCC)	9
UK Airplay (Music Week)	33

Chart (2013)	Peak position
Euro Digital Song Sales (Billboard)	4
Ireland (IRMA)	19
Scottish Singles Sales (Official Charts)	3
UK Singles (Official Charts)	1
UK Airplay (Music Week)	35
UK Indie (Official Charts)	1

=== Year-end charts ===
Chart (1994)	Position
UK Singles (OCC)	71

Chart (2013)	Position
UK Singles (OCC)	126

== Certifications ==
Region	Certification	Certified units/sales
United Kingdom (BPI)	Gold	400,000^{‡}
^{‡} Sales+streaming figures based on certification alone.

== Release history ==
Region	Date	Format(s)	Label	Ref.
United Kingdom	11 July 1994	CD single; cassette single	Telstar	
