= So Many Men – So Little Time =

1983 single by Miquel Brown

"So Many Men, So Little Time"

Single by Miquel Brown

from the album Manpower
- B-side: "So Many Men, So Little Time (Instrumental)"
- Released: 1983
- Genre: Hi-NRG; post-disco
- Length: 3:57; 8:12 (12" and album version)
- Label: Polydor Records
- Songwriters: Ian Levine; Fiachra Trench
- Producers: Ian Levine, Fiachra Trench

Audio
- "So Many Men, So Little Time" on YouTube

"So Many Men – So Little Time", or "So Many Men, So Little Time", is a song by Canadian singer Miquel Brown, which was a hit in 1983.

== Lyrics ==
It is a song about "a woman sleeping with countless men and waking in the morning unaware of the name of the person sharing her bed".

== History ==
Ian Levine and Fiachra Trench wrote this song specifically for the London gay club Heaven, where Levine worked as a DJ.

Levine remembers:

The big record at Heaven was Dan Hartman's 'Relight My Fire'—that's when we brought the big fans out and two thousand people had their hands in the air screaming. It was electrifying. But there weren't enough records coming out that could capture that magic, so we started making our own. I had been at the Circus Maximus in L.A. and I saw a guy wearing a T-shirt that said, 'So many men, so little time,' and I was like, 'One day I want to make a record with that title.' The concept was I sat down with my cowriter and arranger, an Irish guy called Fiachra Trench, and I played him 'Relight My Fire' and I said, 'I want this kind of choppy piano, big powerful chords, and the idea is a woman is going to sing, instead of “I love you, I want you, you're the man of my dreams,” I want the opposite. I want “I wake up next to this man and say, 'Who are you?'” It's so naughty but nice and everyone'll love it.'

The song, along with Evelyn Thomas' "High Energy", played an important role in the evolution of disco into hi-NRG.

== Cover ==
In 1999, the Danish musical duo Me & My covered the song in their second album Let the Love Go On.

== Charts ==
=== Weekly charts ===
Chart (1983)	Peak position
Australian (Kent Music Report)	94
Belgium (Ultratop 50 Flanders)	6
Finland (Suomen virallinen lista)	8
France (IFOP)	51
Netherlands (Dutch Top 40)	11
Netherlands (Single Top 100)	14
Paraguay (La Opinion)	2
Sweden (Sverigetopplistan)	20
UK Singles (Official Charts)	88
US Dance Club Songs (Billboard)	2
West Germany (GfK)	28

Chart (1984)	Peak position
UK Singles (Official Charts)	78

=== Year-end charts ===
Chart (1983)	Position
Belgium (Ultratop Flanders)	68
