= Naughty Naughty (album) =

Studio album by Sinitta
- Released: 1995
- Recorded: 1992–1995
- Genre: Dance-pop
- Label: PWL

Sinitta chronology
Wicked (1989)	Naughty Naughty (1995)	The Best Of Sinitta (1998)

Singles from Naughty Naughty
- 1. "Shame, Shame, Shame" Released: 1992; 2. "The Supreme EP" Released: 1993

Naughty Naughty is the third studio album by British singer Sinitta, released in 1995. The album features her covers of pop songs from the 1970s to the early 1980s. It was released only in Asia in its limited edition.

== Track listing ==
No.	Title	Writer(s)	Original artist	Length
1.	"The Tide Is High"	John Holt	The Paragons	4:07
2.	"You Can't Hurry Love"	Holland–Dozier–Holland	The Supremes	3:55
3.	"Cuba"	Jean Kluger, Daniel Vangarde	Gibson Brothers	3:39
4.	"Club Tropicana"	George Michael, Andrew Ridgeley	Wham!	4:08
5.	"Hotel California"	Don Felder, Don Henley, Glenn Frey	The Eagles	5:00
6.	"Naughty Naughty"	Richard Feldman		3:31
7.	"Shame, Shame, Shame"	Sylvia Robinson	Shirley & Company	3:53
8.	"Where Did Our Love Go"	Holland–Dozier–Holland	The Supremes	4:16
9.	"Never Knew Love Like This Before"	James Mtume, Reggie Lucas	Stephanie Mills	3:30
10.	"You Really Got Me"	Ray Davies	The Kinks	3:05
11.	"Naughty Naughty" (Brand New Heavies Mix)
