= Toy Boy (song) =

Single by Sinitta

from the album Sinitta!
- Released: July 1987
- Recorded: 1987
- Genre: Dance-pop; Hi-NRG
- Length: 3:25
- Label: Fanfare Records
- Songwriter: Stock Aitken Waterman
- Producer: Stock Aitken Waterman

Sinitta singles chronology
"Feels Like the First Time" (1986)	"Toy Boy" (1987)	"GTO" (1987)

"Toy Boy" is a song by British singer Sinitta. Written and produced by Stock Aitken Waterman, it was released on 25 July 1987 and became the fourth single in her self-titled debut album, which came out on 26 December of the same year. It became a hit in the UK and in other European countries where it reached the top ten.

== Background and writing ==
"Toy Boy" was Sinitta's first collaboration with producers Stock Aitken Waterman. In his book, Simon Cowell claims to have come up with the song idea for "Toy Boy", coining the phrase "toy boy" which described older women dating considerably younger guys. However, this is contradicted by writer/producer Mike Stock in his book The Hit Factory: The Stock Aitken Waterman Story as he claims that his inspiration came from the fact that Sinitta herself at the time was dating a younger man. It was inspired by a tabloid newspaper article about the singer's love life, and Sinitta wrote the rap.

== Critical reception ==
Max Bell from Number One complimented the song's "clever wordplay". Maggi Farran of British magazine Music Week described "Toy Boy" a "great dance track that only a corpse could ignore" which she attributed to PWL team's work, while noting Sinitta's great look and voice. When reviewing the parent album, Nancy Culp from Record Mirror considered that songs like "Toy Boy" "can hardly taken seriously, and certainly have no pretensions whatsoever to being state of the art. They're plain and simple, and just good fun". When reviewing the Sinitta! album, Richard Lowe of Smash Hits called "Toy Boy", along with "GTO", "splendidly trashy classics". Retrospectively, in a 2015 review of the parent album, the Pop Rescue website called "Toy Boy" an "exceptionally catchy, bouncy and fun" song.

== Chart performance ==
"Toy Boy" entered the UK chart at number 41 on 25 July 1987, reached number four for consecutive three weeks in August 1987, staying on the charts for 14 weeks, six of them in the top ten, and was certified silver by the British Phonographic Industry. It was thus Sinitta's second most successful single in terms of peak position and number of weeks on the charts, after "So Macho". The song was the 27th best-selling single of 1987 in the UK, selling more than some number ones from that year. In Ireland, it missed the top ten by one place and charted for six weeks there. In Continental Europe, "Top Boy" peaked within the top-five in four nations, attaining number three in Luxembourg, Switzerland and Greece, and number four in Finland. In Germany and Denmark, it peaked at number nine and spent 13 weeks on the German chart, was a top-15 hit in both Sweden and the Flanders region of Belgium, and a top-25 hit in the Netherlands and Spain. On the overall Eurochart Hot 100 compiled by the Music & Media magazine, it started at number 91 on 8 August 1987, climbed until number nine in its ninth week, and remained on the chart for 15 weeks. It was not much aired on radios and appeared for only four weeks on the European Airplay Top 50, with a peak at number 43. Outside Europe, "Toy Boy" was well-received on the US dance charts, peaking at number 19, reached number 13 in New Zealand where it charted for 11 weeks, but barely made the top 50 in Australia.

== Formats and track listings ==
- 7" 1 single
1. "Toy Boy" - 3:25
2. "Toy Boy" (Instrumental) - 4:56
- 7" 2 single
1. "Toy Boy" - 3:25
2. "Toy Boy" (Extended Rap Version) - 3:50
- 12" single
1. "Toy Boy" (The Extended Bicep Mix) - 7:36
2. "Toy Boy" - 3:25
3. "Toy Boy" (Instrumental) - 4:56
- US 12" single
1. "Toy Boy" (The Extended Bicep Mix) - 7:36
2. "Toy Boy" (The Extended British Mix) - 7:00

== Charts ==
=== Weekly charts ===
Weekly chart performance for "Toy Boy"
Chart (1987–88)	Peak position
Australia (Kent Music Report)	49
Belgium (Ultratop 50 Flanders)	14
Denmark (IFPI)	9
Europe (Eurochart Hot 100)	9
Europe (European Airplay Top 50)	43
Finland (Suomen virallinen lista)	4
Greece (IFPI)	3
Ireland (IRMA)	11
Italy (FIMI)	31
Japan (Oricon)	48
Luxembourg (Radio Luxembourg)	3
New Zealand (Recorded Music NZ)	13
Netherlands (Dutch Top 40)	29
Netherlands (Single Top 100)	23
Spain (AFYVE)	23
Sweden (Sverigetopplistan)	13
Switzerland (Schweizer Hitparade)	3
UK Singles (OCC)	4
UK Dance (Music Week)	5
US Hot Dance Club Play (Billboard)	19
West Germany (GfK)	9

=== Year-end charts ===
1987 year-end chart performance for "Toy Boy"
Chart (1987)	Position
Europe (European Hot 100 Singles)	58
Switzerland (Schweizer Hitparade)	26
UK Singles (OCC)	27

1988 year-end chart performance for "Toy Boy"
Chart (1988)	Position
Japan (Oricon)	9

== Certifications ==
Certifications for "Toy Boy"
Region	Certification	Certified units/sales
United Kingdom (BPI)	Silver	250,000^{^}
^{^} Shipments figures based on certification alone.
