= Fanfare Records =

British record label

Fanfare Records was a British record label that was founded by Iain Burton (dancer in The Young Generation, manager of Arlene Phillips and co-founder of Hot Gossip) and Simon Cowell (which made Cowell's first break in the music industry). Burton and Cowell worked together at Fanfare Records for eight years. The label was most successful during the 1980s. The label's biggest success came with Sinitta.

== History ==
In the 1980s, the company launched, and the first release was "Don't Beat Around The Bush" by Hot Gossip in 1984. This was after the departure of Sarah Brightman, and the new incarnation of the band which included Sinitta, prior to her recording solo with Fanfare. The next release was "I Believe in Dreams" by Jackie Rawe, an artist previously part of the band Shakatak. The song did not reach the UK singles chart.

Sinitta's first solo release for Fanfare was "Cruising", but it also failed to chart. However, in 1986, Sinitta's hit "So Macho" became a success for the label, with the single spending twenty eight weeks in the UK singles chart, and finally peaking at no. 2. It went on to become the year's tenth biggest selling single. The follow-up was less successful, and "Feels Like the First Time" flopped at no. 45. The following year, however, Sinitta teamed up with Stock Aitken Waterman who wrote and produced her hits "Toy Boy" (no. 4), "G.T.O" (no. 15), "Cross My Broken Heart" (no. 6) and "I Don't Believe in Miracles" (no. 22). In December 1987, Fanfare Records issued its first album, Sinitta's debut Sinitta!, which gained a British Phonographic Industry (BPI) Gold award, and peaked at no. 34 in the UK Albums Chart.

Other releases on the label included a brief Gloria Gaynor revival with her recording of "Be Soft With Me Tonight", remixed by Stock Aitken Waterman which did not chart, the group Mystic issued "Ritmo De La Roche", whilst Rondò Veneziano failed to chart with "Venice in Peril".

Fanfare Records signed the pop duo Yell! (Paul Varney and Daniel James) in 1989. The group was created by pop manager Jeff Chegwin and scored a no. 10 hit with their cover version of Dan Hartman's "Instant Replay".

Sinitta's hits gradually dried up for the label, with her last Top 10 hit "Right Back Where We Started From" reaching no. 4 in June 1989. The follow ups were less successful, although her cover of Robert Knight's "Love on a Mountain Top" made no. 20. Sinitta's second album Wicked! reached no. 52.

Fanfare Records licensed from PWL Records two compilation releases, The Hit Factory Volume 2 and The Hit Factory Volume 3. Both volumes sold well, with Volume 2 achieving a BPI Platinum disc, and Volume 3 going gold after reaching no. 3 in the UK Compilation Albums Chart. Fanfare released another compilation in association with Just Seventeen magazine in 1989, called Just Seventeen Heartbeats which made no. 3.

In 1992 the Fanfare back catalogue and signed artistes were sold to Bertelsmann Music Group Fanfares Distributor, where Cowell also followed, eventually forming his own label, S Records.

== See also ==
- Lists of record labels
