= Sinitta =

American-British singer (born 1963)

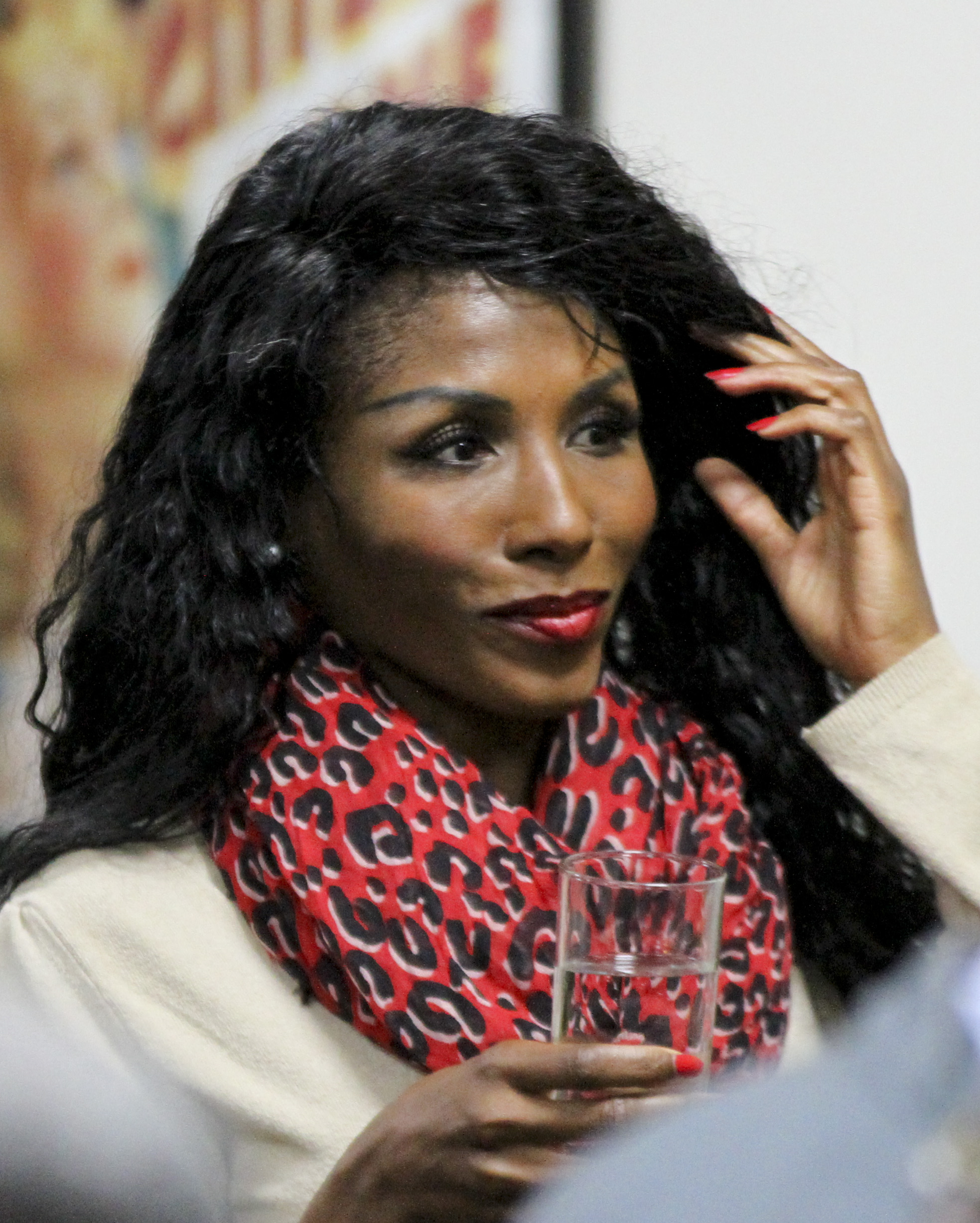
- Sinitta in 2012
- Born: Sinitta Renet Malone; 19 October 1963 (age 62); Seattle, Washington, U.S.
- Occupations: Singer; actress; television personality
- Years active: 1981–present
- Television: Grease Is the Word
- Spouse: Andy Willner (m. 2002; div. 2010)
- Children: 2 (adopted)
- Mother: Miquel Brown
- Relatives: Amii Stewart (aunt)
- Musical career
- Origin: London, England
- Genres: R&B; pop; soul; post-disco; dance-pop; hi-NRG
- Instrument: Vocals
- Labels: Syco; Fanfare
- Website: www.sinitta.com

Sinitta Renet Malone (born 19 October 1963) is an American-British singer and actress. She initially found commercial success in the mid-to-late 1980s with the singles "So Macho", "Toy Boy", "GTO", and "Cross My Broken Heart" and had several other hits during the decade. In the 2000s, she appeared on television in Loose Women, The Xtra Factor and This Morning. She took part in the ITV show I'm a Celebrity... Get Me Out of Here! in 2011.

== Early life ==
She was born in Seattle, Washington in 1963. Sinitta's mother is Miquel Brown, who was a Canadian disco-soul singer in the 1970s and 1980s and a member of the cast of Hair. Sinitta's father's name is Anthony.

Sinitta was born and raised in Seattle and later Detroit, but frequently travelled with her mother on tour including to Sydney. Her mother then directed the London production of Hair; Sinitta was sent to boarding school in East Sussex, and ballet school in Tunbridge Wells from the age of 9. She auditioned for musical roles in London, performing in The Wiz at age 12 while still in school.

== Career ==
=== Early career ===
In 1981, Sinitta appeared in the film Shock Treatment as Frankie, credited as Sinitta Renet. Sinitta continued her career by appearing in several West End productions, notably the first production of the Andrew Lloyd Webber musical Cats. She also later appeared in Little Shop of Horrors. In 1983, she appeared in the video for Forrest's version of The Hues Corporation's "Rock the Boat".

=== 1986–1988: Sinitta! and "So Macho" ===
In 1986, Sinitta released the single "So Macho", which debuted at 59 on the UK charts; the single remained rather low in the charts but, later that year, reached number 16, climbing to number 5 the following week. The subsequent week, "So Macho" reached number 2 in the UK, scoring its highest position on the charts and also giving Sinitta her first Top 3 charting single. "So Macho" spent the following six weeks in the Top 20 in the UK. Alongside this success in the UK, "So Macho" also reached the Top 20 in Sweden, Australia and Austria. "So Macho" subsequently became the highest-charting of Sinitta's career to date. Sinitta's second single "Feels Like the First Time" was less commercially successful, charting at number 45.

In 1987, Sinitta released the lead single from her upcoming debut album, after seeking the help of producers Stock Aitken Waterman (SAW). The product of that collaboration, "Toy Boy", was based on a tabloid headline about Sinitta's love life, and featured a rap written by the singer. It debuted at number 41 and climbed to number 4 in the UK, where it remained for three consecutive weeks. The single remained in the Top 20 for eight weeks. The track also reached number 3 in Switzerland, reaching the Top 20 in Ireland, Belgium, Sweden, Finland and Germany. Sinitta then released the second single from the album, "GTO"; the single reached number 15 on the UK chart.

"GTO" also became Sinitta's first hit in Spain, reaching number 3. The track reached number 11 in Switzerland, number 9 in Norway and number 13 in Ireland. The success of the track came despite the singer initially expressing her dissatisfaction with the subject matter of the song when first presented with the idea by record label boss, Simon Cowell. Fearing that the title would mean nothing to her core audience of gay men and younger record buyers, Sinitta had unsuccessfully begged producers Stock Aitken Waterman to retitle the track before recording. Sinitta later released her debut album Sinitta!, which performed moderately, charting at number 34 in the UK. This album also reached number 69 in Australia.

In 1988, Sinitta released "Cross My Broken Heart", taken from Sinitta!, which reached number 6 in the UK and number 7 in Ireland. The track charted at number 12 in Spain, becoming her second Top 20 single in Spain. Sinitta then released "I Don't Believe In Miracles", which reached number 22 in the UK.

=== 1989–1990: Wicked and "Right Back Where We Started From" ===
In 1989, Sinitta moved away from working directly with producers Stock Aitken Waterman amid creative differences and the producers' changing priorities following the rise of their in-house superstar Kylie Minogue. However, Sinitta did continue to work with Pete Hammond, Phil Harding and Ian Curnow with PWL, in co-operation with German producer Ralf-René Maué who was responsible for such hits of the Hamburg-based eurodisco duo London Boys as "Harlem Desire", "Requiem" and "London Nights". The second album was confirmed as Wicked.

The lead single of the album was a cover of Maxine Nightingale's "Right Back Where We Started From", which debuted at number 19 in the UK and rose to number 6. The track subsequently charted at number 4 for two weeks and remained in the Top 40 for another four weeks. It also charted across the rest of Europe, including reaching number 7 in Finland and the top 40 in Denmark, Spain and Germany. "Right Back Where We Started From" also charted successfully in Oceania, reaching number 7 in Australia and number 2 in New Zealand, thus becoming her highest-charting single in both countries. The track also reached the year-end charts in three countries, including number 45 in Australia, number 38 in New Zealand and number 49 in the UK. As a follow-up single, Sinitta released "Love on a Mountain Top", which charted at number 20 in the UK and number 81 in Australia.

The final single of the album, however, was the least successful out of the three, failing to chart. In 1990, Sinitta released the single "Hitchin' a Ride", which performed moderately, charting at number 20 in the UK, whilst "Love and Affection" peaked at number 62.

=== 1992–1997: "Shame Shame Shame" and "Naughty Naughty" ===
In July 1992, "Shame Shame Shame" debuted at number 31 in the UK, and later peaked at number 28.

The following April, Sinitta released the 4 track EP The Supreme, containing covers of 4 songs originally by The Supremes which charted at number 49 in the UK. In 1995, Sinitta released a cover album called Naughty Naughty, which was also her only album to be released in Asia.

She appeared on the cast recording album for What a Feeling, a live recording taken from the Apollo Playhouse Theatre, Edinburgh, in May 1997, and replaced Irene Cara to tour with Sonia (a fellow former SAW artist) and Luke Goss (formerly of Bros) in the rock and pop musicals concert, What a Feeling the same year.

In 1997, Sinitta recorded vocals for a cover of the Limmie & Family Cookin' hit "You Can Do Magic" with Mike Stock and Matt Aitken, believing it to be her comeback single. However, the track was in fact an elaborate stunt by TV show The Cook Report, which aimed to expose alleged chart rigging by attempting to hype the track into the charts. The record was fronted by reporter Debbie Currie, who pretended to sing to Sinitta's vocal. Sinitta only discovered this when the show was aired, leaving her feeling used and betrayed.

=== 2004–2025: The X Factor era, television and judging ===
In 2004, Sinitta made her premiere appearance on The X Factor in the first series, when she assisted Simon Cowell at the Judges' Houses stage, helping to select his final three acts for the live show, choosing Verity Keays, Rowetta Satchell and the eventual series winner Steve Brookstein. In 2005, Sinitta helped Cowell once more during the second series, this time choosing the final four groups Addictiv Ladies, 4Tune, The Conway Sisters and Journey South. In 2006, she returned in the third series and helped Cowell select his final four acts including Ashley McKenzie, Nikitta Angus, Ray Quinn and Leona Lewis, who became the second winner chosen by them, with Lewis becoming one of the most successful acts from the show. In 2009, Sinitta returned to the show again during the sixth series for the Judges' Houses stage, and then helped Cowell select Jamie Archer, Danyl Johnson and Olly Murs. In 2007, Sinitta became a judge on the ITV show Grease Is the Word.

The following year, Sinitta joined the cast of the daytime ITV show Loose Women as a presenter. In 2010, Sinitta returned to The X Factor for series 7 and helped Cowell again by choosing F.Y.D, Belle Amie and One Direction who have since become the biggest act to have come out of the X Factor. In 2011, however, Sinitta assisted Louis Walsh for the first time, rather than Cowell, when she returned in series 8, selecting Jonjo Kerr, Sami Brookes, Johnny Robinson and Kitty Brucknell. In November that year, Sinitta was confirmed to be taking part in the eleventh series of I'm a Celebrity, Get Me Out of Here! as one of the contestants and she entered the jungle on Day 3.

In 2013, Sinitta helped Walsh on series 10 of The X Factor to select Sam Callahan, Luke Friend and Nicholas McDonald, who eventually finished second. That same year, she appeared in the music video for a cover of a-ha's 1984 hit "Take On Me" on Children in Need. In December, she appeared on Celebrity Come Dine with Me, alongside Danniella Westbrook, Louie Spence and Hugo Taylor.

The following year, Sinitta was announced as joining the cast of the first series of the Channel 4 reality TV show The Jump. Sinitta was eliminated fourth overall, placing seventh.

Sinitta returned to her music career in 2014, with her comeback single being a cover of her mother Miquel Brown's song "So Many Men, So Little Time". She later performed the single at Pride in London. Sinitta returned to The X Factor on series 11 to assist Simon Cowell again that year, when she helped to choose Jay James, second place finalist Fleur East and eventual winner Ben Haenow.

In 2009, Sinitta became one of the main presenters on The Xtra Factor, on which she interviewed the contestants' friends and family. In 2011, she returned to the show during the live show stages as one of the presenters who visited the finalists' home towns. Her segment on the show became regular, and carried on into 2012 and subsequently 2013 and 2014. In 2016, she was announced as the producer and one of the lead presenters of the Xtra Factor; she stated that she had "revamped" the whole show.

Sinitta appeared in the hit reality TV show Ant & Dec's Saturday Night Takeaway as a recurring character in 2016. Alongside this, Sinitta became a series regular on the chat show Up Late with Rylan, and also made appearances on Celebrity Masterchef as a contestant, although she was eliminated in Week 1.

Sinitta's first Christmas track, "I Won't Be Lonely This Christmas", was released on 3 December 2021.

Sinitta took part in the 11th series of Celebs Go Dating but opted to leave the show in episode 14 after failing to find love. The final episode in the series took place in Cyprus, where Sinitta appeared for a surprise performance.

Throughout 2024 Sinitta took part in a live stage show tour of The Masked Singer, performing and touring around Butlin's holiday resorts.

In 2026, she was one of the 'All Stars' contestants in series 2 of I'm a Celebrity... South Africa, first aired on ITV on Easter Monday 6 April 2026.

== Personal life ==
Sinitta was married from 2002 to 2010 to Andy Willner, and has two adopted children. A series of autobiographical videos document her life, and a book is due to follow. Her past relationships and documentation of sexual assaults received media attention in 2018.

She has had a close relationship with Simon Cowell since 1983. They initially dated, and had an on-off relationship for some time before becoming close platonic friends, and are godparents to each other's children.

== Discography ==
Studio albums

- 1987: Sinitta!
- 1989: Wicked
- 1995: Naughty Naughty

== Filmography ==
=== Films and television ===
Year	Title	Role	Notes
1981	Shock Treatment	Frankie	
1983	American Playhouse	Free Space company	Episode: "The Files of Jill Hatch: Part III"
1985	The Wall Game	Team Leader (Herself)	Series 1 only
1986	Foreign Body	Lovely Indian girl	
1988	The Little and Large Show	Herself	Episode: "Episode #8.5"
1995	To Die For	Quilt Documentary narrator	Uncredited voice cameo
2004–2018	The X Factor	Guest mentor / Guest judge	31 episodes
2010	Dancing on Ice	Contestant	Season 5
2011	Im A Celebrity Get Me Out Of Here	Contestant	Series 11, 11th place
2017	Tracey Ullman's Show	Coffee	Episode: "Episode 2"
2017	Who Shot Simon Cowell?	Party guest	Special
2018	Dead Ringer	Tiffany Devale	
2019	The Seven	Ms. Keen	
2021	R.I.A.	Dr. Tonya Smithe	
2022	Celebs Go Dating	Herself	Series 11
2022	The Masked Singer	Herself	Im A Celebrity Special
2023	Richard Osman's House of Games	Herself	Series 7, Week 7
2024	RuPaul's Drag Race: UK vs. the World	Special guest	Series 2, Episode 4
2024	Celebrity Big Brother	Herself	Series 23, Episode 16
2024	Late Night Lycett	Herself	Series 2, Episode 2
2024	Celebrity Bridge of Lies	Herself	Series 2, Episode 3
2026	Im A Celebrity South Africa	Herself	Series 2

== See also ==
- List of one-word stage names
- List of Dancing on Ice contestants
- List of I'm a Celebrity...Get Me Out of Here! (British TV series) contestants
