= Ant & Dec discography =

PJ & Duncan discography
- Studio albums: 3
- Extended plays: 4
- Compilation albums: 6
- Singles: 15
- Video albums: 4

PJ & Duncan, who were later rebranded as Ant & Dec, began their musical career in 1993 with the release of the single "Tonight I'm Free". This was followed in 1994 by their successful debut album Psyche, which included the single "Let's Get Ready to Rhumble". Their second album Top Katz (1995) was less commercially successful than Psyche although all its singles reached the UK Top 20. PJ & Duncan were rebranded as Ant & Dec after they first started moving into TV (The Ant & Dec Show) in 1996, resulting in 1997's The Cult of Ant & Dec, their final album, which reached 15 in the UK charts. Their label, Telstar Records, decided not to renew their recording contract in 1997, and their career in music ended there. They reunited for live performances in 2000 and 2013 and for a single, "We're on the Ball", in 2002.

== Albums ==
=== Studio albums ===
Album title	Album details	Peak chart positions		Certifications
Album title	Album details	UK	AUS	Certifications
Psyche	Released: 4 November 1994; Label: Sony BMG; Formats: CD, digital download	5	—	BPI: Platinum
Top Katz	Released: 3 November 1995; Label: Sony BMG; Formats: CD, digital download	46	49	BPI: Gold
The Cult of Ant & Dec	Released: 12 May 1997; Label: Sony BMG; Formats: CD, digital download	15	—	
"—" denotes album that did not chart or was not released

=== Compilation albums ===
- 1999 The Very Best of PJ & Duncan
- 1999 Ant & Dec - Greatest Hits
- 2000 Ant & Dec - The Hits
- 2008 The Essential Collection
- 2014 PJ & Duncan vs. Ant & Dec - The Collection

=== Extended plays ===
- 1994 Eternal Love E.P.
- 1995 Stuck on U E.P.
- 1995 Stepping Stone E.P.

=== Video albums ===
- 1994 Psyche - The Video
- 1995 Top Katz
- 1996 Out on the Tiles - Live
- 1997 The Cult of Ant & Dec

== Singles ==
Year	Single	Peak chart positions				Certifications	Album
Year	Single	UK	AUS	IRE	SCO	Certifications	Album
1993	"Tonight I'm Free"	62	—	—	—		Psyche
1994	"Why Me?"	27	—	—	—		Psyche
1994	"Let's Get Ready to Rhumble"	9	—	13	—		Psyche
1994	"If I Give You My Number"	15	—	—	—		Psyche
1994	"Eternal Love"	12	—	27	—		Psyche
1995	"Our Radio Rocks"	15	—	25	—		Psyche
1995	"Stuck On U"	12	—	—	—		Top Katz
1995	"U Krazy Katz"	15	—	—	—		Top Katz
1995	"Perfect"	16	—	—	—		Top Katz
1996	"Stepping Stone"	11	25	—	—		Top Katz
1996	"Better Watch Out"	10	—	—	—		The Cult of Ant & Dec
1996	"When I Fall in Love"	12	94	—	—		The Cult of Ant & Dec
1997	"Shout"	10	—	—	—		The Cult of Ant & Dec
1997	"Falling"	14	—	—	—		The Cult of Ant & Dec
2002	"We're on the Ball"	3	—	—	—	BPI: Silver	The Official Album of the 2002 FIFA World Cup
2013	"Let's Get Ready to Rhumble"	1	—	19	3	BPI: Gold	Psyche
2022	"We Werk Together" (with The Vivienne, Lawrence Chaney & Krystal Versace)	—	—	—	—		Non-album single
"—" denotes album that did not chart or was not released.

== Compilation appearances ==
- 1995 Now That's What I Call Music! 31
- 1996 Now That's What I Call Music! 35
- 1997 Now That's What I Call Music! 36
- 2000 CD:UK You Know Where it's At!
- 2001 CD:UK More Wicked Hits
- 2002 The Official Album of the 2002 FIFA World Cup
- 2006 England: The Album 2006
- 2006 Alien Autopsy
- 2007 Fun & Games
- 2013 Now That's What I Call 30 Years
- 2013 Now That's What I Call Music! 85

All are various artists albums. Ant & Dec appear on Now 36, 2002 FIFA World Cup and England: The Album 2006 - with "We're on the Ball" being officially from 2002 FIFA World Cup. The remaining albums are albums released in conjunction with CD:UK, which at the time Ant & Dec presented (Ant & Dec also appear on the front cover of both albums).

- An album of the Brit Awards 2001 was also released. Ant & Dec hosted the event.
- 2007 Fun & Games - featured "Let's Get Ready to Rhumble"
- A soundtrack was released for the Ant & Dec film Alien Autopsy

Ant & Dec performed "Lets Get Ready to Rhumble" on ITV's television show Saturday Night Takeaway on 23 March 2013 as part of The Big Reunion. A few days later, on 31 March, "Lets Get Ready to Rhumble" became their first ever official number 1 single.

From their single "Better Watch Out" until "Lets Get Ready to Rhumble" in 2013, PJ & Duncan used their real names Ant & Dec.
