= We're on the Ball =

2002 single by Ant & Dec

Single by Ant & Dec

from the album The Official Album of the 2002 FIFA World Cup
- Released: 27 May 2002
- Recorded: 2002
- Length: 3:01
- Label: Columbia
- Songwriters: Anthony McPartlin; Declan Donnelly; Harold Spiro
- Producer: Mike Hedges

Ant & Dec singles chronology
"Falling" (1997)	"We're on the Ball" (2002)	"Let's Get Ready to Rhumble" (2013)

Music video
- "We're on the Ball" on YouTube

"We're on the Ball" is a single by British pop and television duo Ant & Dec, released in 2002. It was the second of three comeback performances since their musical career ended in 1997, and their only studio recording since. "We're on the Ball" is a football song, and was adapted from a song written by Harold Spiro. It was produced and arranged by Mike Hedges.

The song is the England football team's official song of the 2002 FIFA World Cup. It features on the album The Official Album of the 2002 FIFA World Cup, released by Epic Records. The song's lyrics are about the England team of the time, featuring references to their victory at the 1966 FIFA World Cup and their attempts to repeat that success since.

The single was re-released digitally in May 2010, to coincide with the World Cup 2010.

== Background and release ==
The song was the duo's first single since their 1997 release "Falling", after which they had decided to end their pop career and move into television presenting. They resurrected their musical career for CD:UK in 2000, for a one-off performance of "Let's Get Ready to Rhumble". Their success with that performance led to "We're on the Ball".

The song entered the UK Singles chart at number three, beaten by a cover of "Light My Fire" by Will Young, who was the winner of that year's series of the reality show Pop Idol, which Ant & Dec presented, and also by the previous week's number-one single, Eminem's "Without Me". It became their highest-peaking single at the time, beating 1994's "Let's Get Ready to Rhumble", which had reached only number nine.

== Music video ==
The music video starts with Ant & Dec eating in a café watching the FIFA World Cup on a television set (which is on top of a fridge that bears a sticker advert for Tizer, who sponsored the music show CD:UK, which Ant & Dec also presented).

Dec explains how they "really want to be at the World Cup", but Ant says "it's too expensive", and they would need to disguise themselves as then England manager Sven-Göran Eriksson and his assistant manager Tord Grip to be at the World Cup. After first laughing it off, they quickly deem it a good idea, disguising themselves in a K6 red telephone box outside the café (a reference to Superman).

The pair then go to the World Cup. The rest of the video sees them singing in the café and in disguise, as well as kicking large inflatable St. George's Flag footballs and, whilst in disguise, managing the England football team. At the end of the video, the duo are caught by officials.

== Charts ==
=== Weekly charts ===
Chart (2002)	Peak position
Europe (Eurochart Hot 100)	15
Scotland Singles (Official Charts)	8
UK Singles (Official Charts)	3

=== Year-end charts ===
Chart (2002)	Position
UK Singles (OCC)	51

== Certifications ==
Region	Certification	Certified units/sales
United Kingdom (BPI)	Silver	200,000^{‡}
^{‡} Sales+streaming figures based on certification alone.

== See also ==
- PJ & Duncan discography
- Tizer
- 2002 FIFA World Cup
