= When I Fall in Love (Ant & Dec song) =

1996 single by Ant & Dec

Single by Ant & Dec

from the album The Cult of Ant & Dec
- Released: November 12, 1996
- Recorded: 1995–1996
- Genre: Pop
- Label: Telstar Records
- Songwriters: Anthony McPartlin, Declan Donnelly, Matt Rowe, Richard Stannard, Pete Davis

Ant & Dec singles chronology
| "Better Watch Out" (1996) | "When I Fall in Love" (1996) | "Shout" (1997) |

Music video
- "When I Fall in Love" on YouTube

"When I Fall In Love" is the twelfth single by Ant & Dec, formerly known as PJ & Duncan and the second to be taken from their final album The Cult of Ant & Dec.

== Track listing ==
1. When I Fall in Love - Radio Edit with Rap
2. When I Fall in Love - Radio Edit without Rap
3. When I Fall in Love - Unboza Remix
4. Gonna B Alright

== Chart performance ==
| Chart (1996) | Peak position |
|---|---|
| Australia (ARIA) | 94 |
| UK Singles (OCC) | 12 |
| UK Airplay (Music Week) | 17 |
