= Shout (Ant & Dec song) =

1997 single by Ant & Dec

Single by Ant & Dec

from the album The Cult of Ant & Dec
- Released: March 3, 1997
- Recorded: 1995–96
- Genre: Pop rock
- Length: 3:52 (radio edit)
- Label: Telstar Records
- Songwriters: Anthony McPartlin; Declan Donnelly; Ian Bowman; Julian Gallagher
- Producer: Richard Stannard

Ant & Dec singles chronology
"When I Fall In Love" (1996)	"Shout" (1997)	"Falling" (1997)

Music video
- "Shout" Video on YouTube

"Shout" is the thirteenth single by British television presenting duo Ant & Dec, formerly known as PJ & Duncan and the third to be taken from their final album, The Cult of Ant & Dec (1997). The single was released in March 1997 by Telstar Records, and reached number 10 in the UK Singles Chart. The song is in a pop rock style.

The song features backing vocals from Erasure's Andy Bell, and its chorus, "Shout.. come on, let it out" is influenced by the Tears for Fears' song "Shout" where the chorus begins with "Shout, shout, let it all out". The song also features a bass line that echoes that in Lou Reed's 1972 Walk On the Wild Side.

The music video sees Ant & Dec in a flat or hotel room, with Dec seated on the bed playing the acoustic guitar and Ant singing while seated on the floor. The video has film noir references.

== Critical reception ==
Gavin Reeve from Smash Hits gave "Shout" four out of five, commenting, "Blimey! Ant & Dec in 'Slightly More Grown Up Single Shocker!' Don't be alarmed, it's not Robson & Jerome 2, just a more mature record, with a serious message about the frustration of talking and talking about problems and not being heard. Hence the shouting. Ant takes on lead vocal duty, while Dec strums along on his new gee-tar and joins in on the easy-to-learn chorus. Not the sort of tune you can do a "Rhumble" type dance routine to, but a birrova grower nevertheless. Well done."

== Charts ==
Chart (1997)	Peak position
UK Singles (OCC)	10
UK Airplay (Music Week)	9
