= Falling (Ant & Dec song) =

Single by Ant & Dec

from the album The Cult of Ant & Dec
- Released: May 15, 1997
- Recorded: 1995–1996
- Genre: Pop
- Length: 4:32
- Label: Telstar Records
- Songwriters: Anthony McPartlin, Declan Donnelly, Steve Mac, Wayne Hector
- Producer: Steve Mac

Ant & Dec singles chronology
| "Shout" (1997) | "Falling" (1997) | "We're on the Ball" (2002) |

Music video
- "Falling" on YouTube

"Falling" is the fourteenth single by Ant & Dec and the last to be taken from their final album, The Cult of Ant & Dec. It was released in 1997 and served as their final single until 2002's "We're on the Ball". "Falling" reached number 14 on the UK charts upon its initial release.

== Charts ==
=== Weekly charts ===
| Chart (1997) | Peak position |
|---|---|
| UK Singles (OCC) | 14 |
| UK Airplay (Music Week) | 31 |
