= The Cult of Ant & Dec =

Studio album by Ant & Dec
- Released: 12 May 1997 (worldwide); 9 July 1997 (Japan)
- Recorded: 1996–97
- Genres: Pop; pop rock; teen pop
- Length: 50:38
- Label: Sony BMG
- Producers: Ray Hedges; Martin Brannigan; Richard Stannard; Steve Mac; Wayne Hector; Dom Hawken; Julian Gallagher

Ant & Dec chronology
Top Katz (1995)	The Cult of Ant & Dec (1997)

Singles from The Cult of Ant & Dec
- 1. "All I Have to Do Is Dream" Released: 15 June 1996; 2. "Better Watch Out" Released: 12 August 1996; 3. "When I Fall in Love" Released: 12 November 1996; 4. "Shout" Released: 3 March 1997; 5. "Falling" Released: 15 May 1997; 6. "Crazy" Released: 9 July 1997 (Japan only)

Professional ratings
Review scores
Source	Rating
NME	6/10

The Cult of Ant & Dec is the third and final studio album released by British duo Ant & Dec, previously known as PJ & Duncan. The album was recorded during 1996 and 1997, and included the single "When I Fall in Love". The album was released in May 1997 and peaked at number 15 on the UK Albums Chart.

== Background and recording ==
For the release of their third studio album, Ant & Dec decided to drop their character names of PJ & Duncan, and continue recording under their real names. Recording began in April 1996, with the duo's long-time collaborator Ray Hedges. Hedges penned the tracks "Just a Little Love" and "Better Watch Out" for the album, as well as producing covers of "Game of Love" and "All I Have to Do Is Dream". In an attempt to break Europe and Asia, "All I Have to Do Is Dream" was released as a single in June 1996, to moderate success in Germany and South Korea. "Better Watch Out" was then released as the album's international lead single in August 1996, receiving moderate success in the United Kingdom.

Due to Hedges' involvement in the recording of Boyzone's second studio album, A Different Beat, he was unable to continue writing with the duo, who were instead referred to songwriter Richard Stannard, who penned their next single, "When I Fall in Love". A large block of the album was produced by Stannard, with co-production from Pete Davis and Matt Rowe. Rob Kean and Tony Vickers also co-produced two tracks for the album, "Bound" and "Cloud Nine".

The final recording sessions for the album saw the duo hook up with songwriter Wayne Hector and production supremo Steve Mac, who helped pen the final two tracks for the album: "Falling" and "Crazy". However, the release of "Falling" as a single was the decision that subsequently ended their British musical career. The track was pulled from the British charts under the instruction of their record label, Telstar Records, after claims of copyright infringement were made, brought about by a pop duo, 'And all because...', who were also managed by Ant and Dec's management team. The duo claimed that Ant & Dec had stolen the song from them, and released it without their consent. Subsequently, Telstar Records decided not to renew their existing contract, and they were dropped from the label.

However, the duo's Japanese record label, Cutting Edge, made the decision to continue pushing the duo's career, and as such, hooked them up with a group of well known international songwriters, to help write five brand new tracks to appear on a special deluxe version of the album to be released in Japan. The new version of the album was led by the Mac and Hector-penned single "Crazy", which was heavily remixed for its use as a single, and both the album and single received success in the region. However, after the loss of their British record deal, and having not wanted to move to the other side of the world to continue in the music, the duo decided to call it day as musicians, making "Crazy" their last release as a single.

Epic Records in Asia later made the decision to re-issue the album without the duo's consent, adding the single "All I Have to Do is Dream" and the Japanese-only track "This Must Be Heaven" as bonus tracks, with "All I Have to Do is Dream" not appearing on any other version of the release. Epic also released a VHS video of the same name, containing the duo's entire back catalogue of music videos, karaoke versions, behind the scenes footage and live tour performances from the duo's Asian tour, plus footage from the Out on the Tiles VHS formerly released in July 1996.

== Track listing ==
No.	Title	Writer(s)	Producer(s)	Length
1.	"The Cult of Ant & Dec"	Anthony McPartlin, Declan Donnelly, Matt Rowe, Richard Stannard	Richard Stannard	3:00
2.	"When I Fall in Love"	McPartlin, Donnelly, Rowe, Stannard, Pete Davis	Richard Stannard, Pete Davis	3:53
3.	"Shout"	McPartlin, Donnelly, Julian Gallagher, Ian Bowman	Richard Stannard	3:50
4.	"Falling"	McPartlin, Donnelly, Steve Mac, Wayne Hector	Steve Mac	4:32
5.	"Crazy"	McPartlin, Donnelly, Mac, Hector	Steve Mac	3:43
6.	"Cloud Nine"	McPartlin, Donnelly, Tony Vickers, Rob Kean, Dominic Hawken	Rob Kean, Tony Vickers	3:31
7.	"Just A Little Love"	McPartlin, Donnelly, Ray Hedges, Martin Brannigan	Ray Hedges	3:59
8.	"Better Watch Out"	McPartlin, Donnelly, Hedges, Brannigan	Ray Hedges	3:15
9.	"Game of Love"	McPartlin, Donnelly, Clint Ballard, Jr.	Ray Hedges	3:40
10.	"Bound"	McPartlin, Donnelly, Vickers, Kean, Hawken	Rob Kean, Tony Vickers	3:37
11.	"Masterplan"	McPartlin, Donnelly, Stannard, Davis	Richard Stannard	3:42
12.	"Universal Sun"	McPartlin, Donnelly, Stannard, Rowe	Richard Stannard, Matt Rowe	4:23
13.	"Apology"	McPartlin, Donnelly, Stannard, Rowe	Richard Stannard, Matt Rowe	4:15
14.	"The Cult of Ant & Dec (Reprise)" (hidden track)	McPartlin, Donnelly, Stannard, Rowe	Richard Stannard, Matt Rowe	3:18

Japanese deluxe edition bonus tracks
No.	Title	Writer(s)	Producer(s)	Length
14.	"Crazy" (I Love You '97 Remix)	McPartlin, Donnelly, Mac, Hector	Steve Mac	3:41
15.	"Today"
16.	"Who Are You"
17.	"Make My Move"
18.	"Rock Me (Tick Tock)"
19.	"This Must Be Heaven"	Richard Norris, David Ball	Richard Norris	3:47

Asian special edition bonus tracks
No.	Title	Writer(s)	Producer(s)	Length
1.	"Falling"	McPartlin, Donnelly, Steve Mac, Wayne Hector	Steve Mac	4:32
2.	"Shout"	McPartlin, Donnelly, Julian Gallagher, Ian Bowman	Richard Stannard	3:50
3.	"When I Fall in Love"	McPartlin, Donnelly, Rowe, Stannard, Pete Davis	Richard Stannard, Pete Davis	3:53
4.	"Crazy"	McPartlin, Donnelly, Mac, Hector	Steve Mac	3:43
5.	"Cloud Nine"	McPartlin, Donnelly, Tony Vickers, Rob Kean, Dominic Hawken	Rob Kean, Tony Vickers	3:31
6.	"Just A Little Love"	McPartlin, Donnelly, Ray Hedges, Martin Brannigan	Ray Hedges	3:59
7.	"Who Are You"
8.	"All I Have to Do is Dream"	Felice and Boudleaux Bryant	Ray Hedges	3:18
9.	"This Must Be Heaven"	Richard Norris, David Ball	Richard Norris	3:47
10.	"Better Watch Out"	McPartlin, Donnelly, Hedges, Brannigan	Ray Hedges	3:15
11.	"Bound"	McPartlin, Donnelly, Vickers, Kean, Hawken	Rob Kean, Tony Vickers	3:37
12.	"Masterplan"	McPartlin, Donnelly, Stannard, Davis	Richard Stannard	3:42
13.	"Universal Sun"	McPartlin, Donnelly, Stannard, Rowe	Richard Stannard, Matt Rowe	4:23
14.	"Apology"	McPartlin, Donnelly, Stannard, Rowe	Richard Stannard, Matt Rowe	4:15
15.	"The Cult of Ant & Dec"	McPartlin, Donnelly, Stannard, Rowe	Richard Stannard	3:00

== Charts ==
Chart (1997)	Peak position
Taiwanese Albums Chart	10
Scottish Albums Chart	26
UK Albums Chart	15
