= Better Watch Out (song) =

Single by Ant & Dec

from the album The Cult of Ant & Dec
- Released: August 12, 1996
- Recorded: 1995–1996
- Genre: Pop
- Label: Telstar Records
- Songwriters: Anthony McPartlin; Declan Donnelly; Ray Hedges; Martin Brannigan
- Producer: Ray Hedges

Ant & Dec singles chronology
| "Stepping Stone" (1996) | "Better Watch Out" (1996) | "When I Fall In Love" (1996) |

Music video
- "Better Watch Out" on YouTube

"Better Watch Out" is the eleventh single by Ant & Dec, their first under that name (their previous singles were released as PJ & Duncan), and the first to be taken from their final album, The Cult of Ant & Dec. The song has no relation to Christmas (the title may lead to confusion with the lyrics of Santa Claus Is Comin' to Town), and is instead about a man who tries to court a girl only to get confronted by her brothers. The video starts with Ant & Dec in a barbershop.

== Charts ==
=== Weekly charts ===
| Chart (1996) | Peak position |
|---|---|
| UK Singles (Official Charts Company) | 10 |
| UK Airplay (Music Week) | 45 |
