= Better Watch Out (disambiguation) =

Better Watch Out is a 2016 Australian-American psychological horror film.

(You) Better Watch Out may also refer to:

== Film and television ==
- Silent Night, Deadly Night 3: Better Watch Out!, a 1989 American slasher film written and directed by Monte Hellman
- You Better Watch Out, alternative title for Christmas Evil, a 1980 psychological slasher film
- You Better Watch Out, a 2008 short comedy film starring Caitlin McDougall
- "You Better Watch Out" (NCIS), an episode of television series NCIS
- "You Better Watch Out" (Married... with Children), a second-season episode of television series Married... with Children

== Music ==
- "You better watch out", a lyric from the 1934 song "Santa Claus Is Comin' to Town"
- "Better Watch Out", a 1969 song by Leslie West from the album Mountain
- "Better Watch Out", a 1969 single by McKenna Mendelson Mainline
- "You Better Watch Out", a 1974 single by Gwen Owens, written by T. Woodford and C. Ivey in 1974, covered by Táta Vega
- "Better Watch Out" (song), a 1996 single by Ant & Dec
