= Ant & Dec's Push the Button =

British game show

- Created by: Anthony McPartlin; Declan Donnelly
- Presented by: Ant & Dec
- Narrated by: Ronnie Corbett; Matt Berry
- Theme music composer: Paul Farrer
- Country of origin: United Kingdom
- Original language: English
- No. of series: 2
- No. of episodes: 14

Production
- Production locations: Pinewood Studios; The Fountain Studios
- Running time: 60 minutes 75 minutes
- Production company: Gallowgate Productions

Original release
- Network: ITV
- Release: 27 February 2010 – 2 April 2011

Ant & Dec's Push the Button is a game show which first aired on ITV from 27 February 2010 until 2 April 2011, lasting for two series and 14 episodes. The show is hosted by Ant & Dec. In each episode, two families compete for a chance to win up to £100,000 cash. Ronnie Corbett served as the show's announcer for the first series and was then replaced by Matt Berry. The programme was pre-recorded in series 1, and broadcast live in series 2.

== Format ==
Both families are credited with £100,000 at the outset, then play four head-to-head games with a different member randomly chosen from both families for each. A large button is used in each game, and must be pushed according to the instructions. In some games, the button is pushed to start a family's total counting down, and again to stop it once the game is complete. In others, the winner can push it to deduct money from the opposing family's total. The team with the higher remaining total after the fourth game has a chance to win that money in the final round.

Families are matched up against one another in groups of either five (series 1) or four (series 2). For four-person teams, a different family member plays each game alone; in the case of five people, the two who are not chosen for the first three games compete together in the fourth one.

Games are interspersed with short comedy sketches by Ant & Dec and the revelation of funny or embarrassing moments in the families' lives. One game per episode typically involves the competing family members receiving instruction in a particular skill, such as ice dancing or yodeling, and then giving a performance for the studio audience. The winner is determined by audience vote in some episodes, or by the decision of a panel of judges in others.

=== The Accumulator ===
This is played as the fourth game of each episode in series 2. The contestants are asked three questions that require them to predict the outcome of a pre-recorded event or survey, and must wager a portion of their family's total on each. (E.g. predict whether a professional football player can kick a ball cleanly over the roof of a house.) A correct guess adds the wager to the total, while an incorrect guess subtracts it. The maximum wager increases from one question to the next (£5,000, £10,000, entire total).

== Final: DAVE (Dynamic Audio-Visual Endgame) ==
Similar to the electronic memory game Simon, five coloured panels are arranged on the stage, each of which produces a different musical tone when it lights up. The goal is to replicate several sequences of tones.

=== Series 1 ===
All five panels have separate buttons. The five family members each stand at a different panel and must replicate five sequences by pushing their buttons. The first sequence has three tones, and each successive one has two more tones than the last.

Each correct sequence puts one digit from the family's total into their final winnings, proceeding from left to right. For example, a family with a total of £61,250 would win £6, £61, £612, £6,125, and finally the entire £61,250 for completing all five sequences. The family may make one mistake without penalty and play another sequence of the same length, but a second mistake ends the game and awards them whatever money they have accumulated to that point.

Partway through the series, a rule change allowed one last chance at the jackpot to a family that had made two mistakes. They could either keep their accumulated money or risk it by having one member of their choice repeat a seven-tone sequence. Successfully doing so awarded the entire jackpot, but any error sent the family home with nothing.

=== Series 2 ===
One family member stands behind a console with five buttons, facing the panels, and must replicate four sequences. The first three award 10% (three tones), 25% (five tones), and 50% (seven tones) of the family's total, respectively, and the fourth (nine tones) awards the entire jackpot.

The family member has 10 seconds to replicate each of the first three sequences, and 15 seconds for the fourth. One mistake ends the game immediately and awards the family the accumulated money.

Regardless of the outcome, the winning family is invited to return for the next show.

== Transmissions ==
Series	Episodes	Originally released	
Series	Episodes	First released	Last released
1	6	27 February 2010	3 April 2010
2	8	12 February 2011	2 April 2011

== Ratings ==
Episode viewing figures from BARB.

=== Series 1 ===
Episode	Air date	Official ITV1 rating (millions)	ITV1 weekly ranking	Share
1	27 February 2010	7.25	15	26.7%
2	6 March 2010	6.33	17	24.4%
3	13 March 2010	5.28	17	20.8%
4	20 March 2010	5.83	16	24%
5	27 March 2010	5.37	15	21.5%
6	3 April 2010	4.34	16	18.6%

=== Series 2 ===
Episode	Air date	Official ITV1 rating (millions)	ITV1 weekly ranking	Share
1	12 February 2011	5.85	15	24.8%
2	19 February 2011	4.31	21	19.4%
3	26 February 2011	4.06	21	17.2%
4	5 March 2011	4.35	19	19.8%
5	12 March 2011	4.32	24	18.5%
6	19 March 2011	5.57	13	25.3%
7	26 March 2011	4.54	18	20.8%
8	2 April 2011	3.92	21	19.6%

== International versions ==
Country	Title	Presenter(s)	Broadcaster(s)	Aired
France	Pouch' le bouton	Vincent Lagaf'	TF1	7 May – 11 June 2011
Portugal	Carrega no Botão!	Fernando Mendes and José Carlos Malato	RTP1	2010
