= We Werk Together =

2022 song by Ant & Dec

Single by Ant & Dec, The Vivienne, Lawrence Chaney & Krystal Versace
- Released: 19 February 2022
- Recorded: 2022
- Genre: dance-pop
- Length: 3:37
- Label: Lifted Entertainment
- Composer(s): Ian Masterson; Hayley Sanderson
- Producer(s): Ian Masterson

Music video
- "We Werk Together" on YouTube

"We Werk Together" is a 2022 song by Ant & Dec, featuring The Vivienne, Lawrence Chaney, and Krystal Versace. The song was released in the United Kingdom on 19 February 2022 in support of The Trussell Trust, a UK based charity. Written by Ian Masterson and arranged by Hayley Sanderson, it peaked at number 8 on the UK Singles Chart in March 2022.

== Background ==
Ant & Dec collaborated with the three winners of Drag Race UK - The Vivienne (Season 1), Lawrence Chaney (Season 2), and Krystal Versace (Season 3) - to support The Trussell Trust, a charity dedicated to providing food banks across the UK. All proceeds from the single were donated to the charity. The song debuted during the "End of the Show Show" segment in the live opening episode of the eighteenth series of Ant & Dec's Saturday Night Takeaway, where Ant & Dec performed in drag as "Lady Antoinette" and "Miss Donna Lee".

== Chart performance ==
On 3 March 2022, the song entered the UK Singles Sales chart at number 8 where it remained for one week.

| Chart (2022) | Peak position |
|---|---|
| UK Singles (OCC) | 8 |
