= Ant McPartlin =

English television presenter

Ant McPartlin OBE
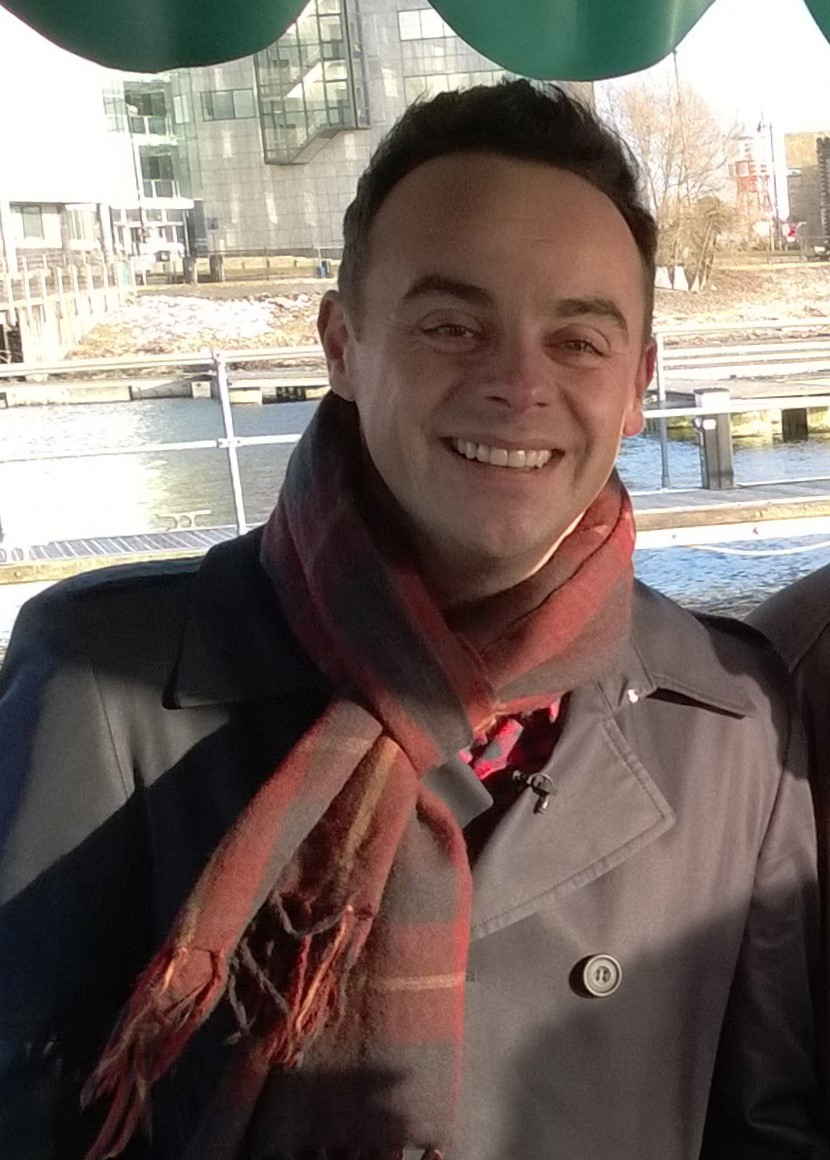
- McPartlin in 2014
- Born: Anthony David McPartlin; 18 November 1975 (age 51); Newcastle upon Tyne, England
- Occupations: Television presenter; actor; former singer; rapper; comedian
- Years active: 1987–present
- Spouse(s): Lisa Armstrong (m. 2006; div. 2018) Anne-Marie Corbett (m. 2021)
- Children: 1
- Anthony McPartlin's voice from the BBC programme Desert Island Discs, 29 December 2013.

Anthony David McPartlin (born 18 November 1975) is an English television presenter, television producer, comedian, former singer, rapper and actor. He is best known for working alongside Declan Donnelly as part of the presenting duo Ant & Dec.

McPartlin came to prominence, alongside Donnelly, in the children's drama series Byker Grove, with both of the boys establishing successful careers as television presenters, in which they presented SMTV Live (between 1998 and 2001), I'm a Celebrity...Get Me Out of Here! and Ant & Dec's Saturday Night Takeaway (2002–2024), and Britain's Got Talent (since 2007).

Other notable highlights of McPartlin's career alongside Donnelly include presenting PokerFace, Push the Button, Pop Idol, and Red or Black?, being hosts of charity appeal Text Santa (between 2011 and 2014), and also performing as pop music duo PJ & Duncan.

== Career ==
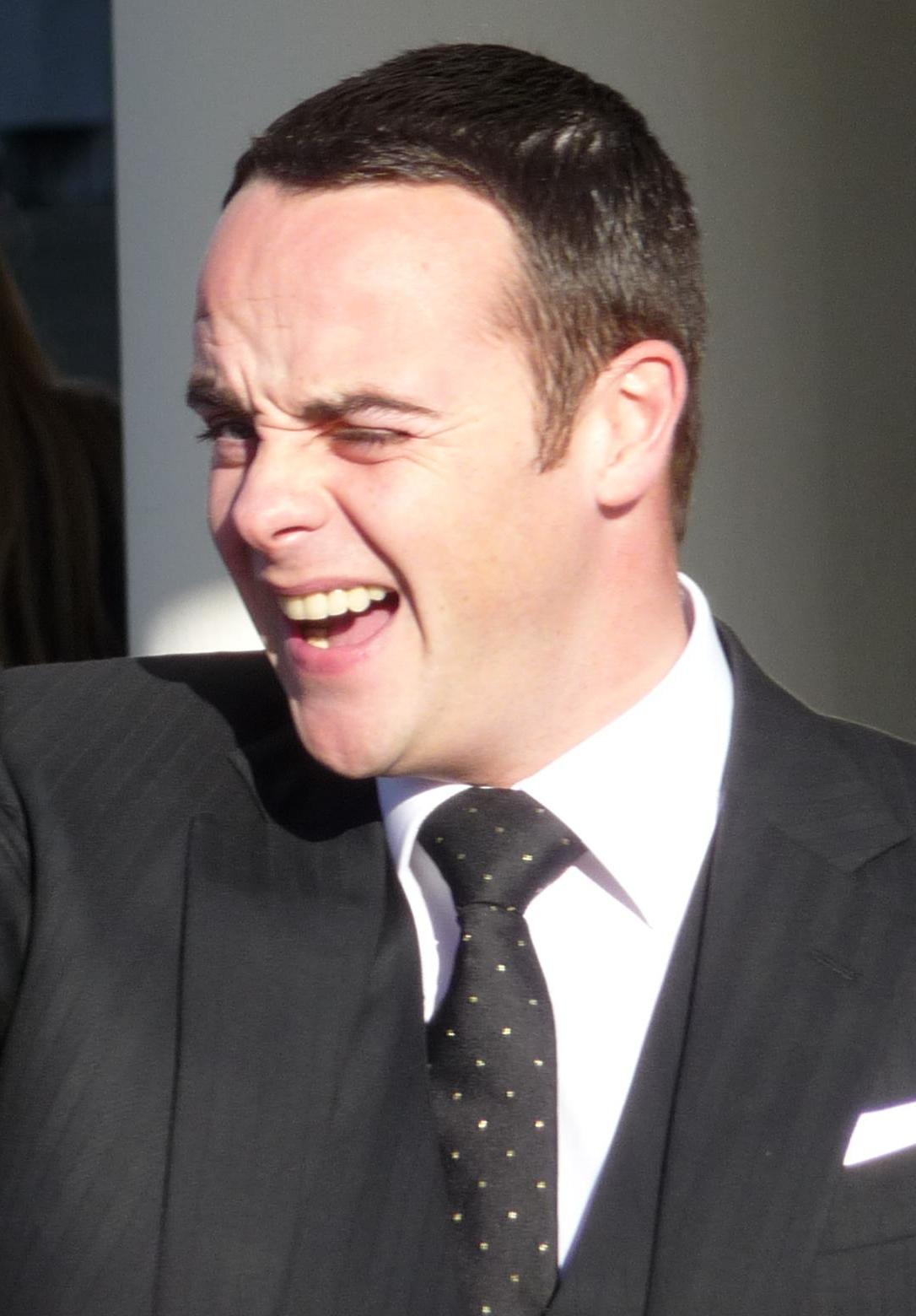
McPartlin at the 62nd British Academy Film Awards, April 2009

McPartlin's first appearance on television was on the children's workshop programme Why Don't You?, but his big break came when he rose to prominence playing the character of PJ in the CBBC series Byker Grove. It was during his time on the programme that he first met Declan Donnelly, who was cast in the part of Duncan. The pair formed a close friendship on the programme, both socially and professionally, with the men performing as their characters until their departure from the programme in 1993. During their tenure, the pair created a number of hit records under the label of "PJ & Duncan AKA", including the song "Tonight I'm Free" that had been performed on Byker Grove.

From then onwards, McPartlin and Donnelly worked together on television, creating the presenting duo of Ant & Dec. Initially, the pair continued to work in children's television with the Saturday morning hit SMTV Live, before they eventually branched out into gameshows – Friends Like These, PokerFace and Push the Button – along with talent shows – Pop Idol, and Britain's Got Talent – and entertainment programmes – I'm a Celebrity... Get Me Out of Here!, and Ant & Dec's Saturday Night Takeaway. The pair continued to maintain work in acting, starring in a tribute to The Likely Lads, in the form of a remake of an episode from the show's sequel Whatever Happened to the Likely Lads? entitled "No Hiding Place". In 2006, McPartlin and Donnelly starred together in the film Alien Autopsy.

In 2007, it was discovered that two shows, Ant & Dec's Gameshow Marathon and Ant & Dec's Saturday Night Takeaway, which he co-presented with Donnelly, had defrauded viewers participating in phone-ins. The latter was produced by the pair's own production company.

== Personal life ==
On 22 July 2006, McPartlin married his longtime girlfriend, make-up artist Lisa Armstrong at Cliveden, a country house hotel in Berkshire. The couple were married for 11 years before eventually announcing on 15 January 2018 that they were divorcing.

McPartlin was a Labour Party supporter until the 2010 election, when he voted for the Conservative Party. In February 2013, he told The Guardian newspaper that he would struggle to justify voting for either political party in the future.

In 2015, McPartlin went into hospital for an operation to treat his knee and was advised to take prescription drugs to combat pain after the surgery was botched. Over the course of the following two years, he slowly became addicted to alcohol, codeine and prescription drugs, including opioid OxyContin, including use before television appearances. In June 2017, he sought treatment for his addiction to prescription drugs and checked himself in for rehabilitation; he was released two months later.

On 18 March 2018, McPartlin was involved in a road traffic collision in London, after which he was arrested on suspicion of drink-driving. The following day, on 19 March, he met with Donnelly and ITV and suspended further presenting duties to return to rehab for further treatment. On 16 April 2018, he was interviewed under caution and subsequently charged with drink-driving. McPartlin pleaded guilty to the offence at Wimbledon Magistrates' Court the following month, and was banned from driving for 20 months and fined £86,000, believed to be Britain's highest-ever penalty for drink-driving at the time. He had previously been banned from driving for 30 days and fined £350 for driving at 127 mph (204 km/h) on the A1(M) motorway in 2002.

In August 2018, McPartlin announced he would be taking a break from television presenting duties until 2019, saying: "My recovery is going very well and for that to continue having spoken to Dec and ITV, I have made the decision to take the rest of the year off."

In January 2019, McPartlin returned to his television duties alongside Donnelly at the Britain's Got Talent auditions. The same month, he disclosed that he had been diagnosed with attention deficit hyperactivity disorder.

On 7 August 2021, McPartlin married Anne-Marie Corbett, who was formerly his personal assistant, at St Michael's Church in Heckfield, Hampshire. They had been in a relationship since 2018. The couple live in Wimbledon, London. On 14 May 2024, Corbett gave birth to a baby boy.

== Charity ==
McPartlin and Donnelly are patrons of the charity Sunshine Fund. When their single "Let's Get Ready to Rhumble" reached No.1, Ant & Dec donated the single's success to the charity ChildLine. They also support the Text Santa appeal.

They opened the W4 Youth Centre in 2013.

== Earnings ==
In 2002, Ant & Dec signed a two-year golden handcuffs deal with ITV, worth £2m. In 2004, they signed a new deal with ITV, running until the end of 2007.

In April 2007, the duo signed a two-year golden handcuffs deal with ITV, reportedly worth £30–40 million. In 2009, the duo extended their deal for two years. In 2011, they extended their deal for a further two years.

In November 2016, the pair signed a new three-year deal with ITV, estimated to be worth £30 million over three years.

== Honours and awards ==
McPartlin was appointed an Officer of the Order of the British Empire (OBE) in the 2016 Birthday Honours for his services to broadcasting and entertainment.

The following listed below are the television awards that McPartlin has been nominated for or awarded with, primarily while working alongside Declan Donnelly as Ant & Dec:

1994

- Brit Award Nomination – Best Song: "Let's Get Ready to Rhumble"

1995

- Brit Award Nomination – British Breakthrough
- Royal Television Society Awards- The Ant and Dec Show

1996

- British Academy Children's Awards: Children's Entertainment Show (The Ant and Dec Show)

1997

- Nominated – British Academy Children's Awards: Children's Entertainment Show (The Ant and Dec Show)

1998

- British Academy Children's Awards: Children's Entertainment Show (Ant and Dec Unzipped)

2000

- British Academy Children's Awards: Children's Entertainment Show (SMTV Live)
- TV Choice Awards: Best Children's Show (SMTV Live)
- Royal Television Society Awards: Best Children's Entertainment Programme (SMTV Live)
- TV Hits Awards: Best Teen Show (CD:UK)
- Loaded Carling Good Work Fellas Awards: Best Double Act
- British Comedy Awards: The People's Choice (SMTV Live)

2001

- TV Choice Awards: Best Children's Show (SMTV Live)
- Broadcast Awards: Best Children's Programme (SMTV Live)
- Royal Television Society Awards : Best Television Presenters
- Disney Channel Awards: Kids Awards (The Ant and Dec Show)
- Nominated – British Academy Children's Awards: Best Children's Entertainment Show (SMTV Live)

2002

- Nominated – British Academy Television Awards: Entertainment Performance (Pop Idol)
- British Academy Children's Awards: Children's Entertainment Show (SMTV Live)

2005

- Nominated – British Academy Television Awards: Entertainment Performance (I'm a Celebrity... Get Me Out of Here!)

2006

- British Comedy Awards: Best Comedy Entertainment Personality
- British Comedy Awards: Best Comedy Entertainment Programme

2007

- Nominated – British Academy Television Awards: Entertainment Performance (Ant & Dec's Saturday Night Takeaway)

2008

- TV Quick & TV Choice Awards: Best Entertainment Show (Saturday Night Takeaway)
- Nickelodeon UK Kids Choice Awards 2008: Favourite Funny Person, Best TV presenters and Best Family TV show (Britain's Got Talent)

2009

- TV Quick & TV Choice Awards: Best Entertainment Show (Ant & Dec's Saturday Night Takeaway)
- TV Quick & TV Choice Awards:Outstanding Contribution Award
- Nominated – British Academy Television Awards: Entertainment Performance (I'm a Celebrity... Get Me Out of Here!)

2010

- British Academy Television Awards: Entertainment Performance (I'm a Celebrity... Get Me Out of Here!)
- British Academy Television Awards: Entertainment Programme (Britain's Got Talent)

2012

- Freesat: Best TV Presenter(s)

2013

- TRIC Awards: TV Personality of the Year
- TRIC Awards: TRIC Special Award (I'm a Celebrity... Get Me Out of Here!)
- RTS Awards: Entertainment Performance (I'm a Celebrity... Get Me Out of Here!)
- Nominated – British Academy Television Awards: Entertainment Performance (I'm a Celebrity... Get Me Out of Here!)

2014

- British Academy Television Awards: Entertainment Performance (Ant & Dec's Saturday Night Takeaway)
- British Academy Television Awards: Entertainment Programme (Ant & Dec's Saturday Night Takeaway)

2015

- British Academy Television Awards: Entertainment Performance (Ant & Dec's Saturday Night Takeaway)
- British Academy Television Awards: Entertainment Programme (Ant & Dec's Saturday Night Takeaway)

2017

- British Academy Television Awards: Entertainment Programme (Ant & Dec's Saturday Night Takeaway)
- British Academy Television Awards: Live Event (The Queen's 90th Birthday Celebration)

2018

- British Academy Television Awards: Entertainment Programme (Britain's Got Talent)

2019

- Guinness World Records: Most NTA wins for Best Presenter won consecutively
- British Academy Television Awards: Entertainment Programme (Britain's Got Talent)

== National Television Awards ==
Year	Award	Show
2001	Most Popular Entertainment Presenter	
2002	Most Popular Entertainment Presenter	
2002	Most Popular Entertainment Programme	Pop Idol
2002	Special Recognition Award	
2003	Most Popular Entertainment Presenter	
2003	Most Popular Entertainment Programme	Ant & Dec's Saturday Night Takeaway
2003	Most Popular Reality Programme	I'm a Celebrity... Get Me Out of Here!
2004	Most Popular Entertainment Presenter	
2004	Most Popular Entertainment Programme	Ant & Dec's Saturday Night Takeaway
2005	Most Popular Entertainment Presenter	
2006	Most Popular Entertainment Presenter	
2006	Most Popular Quiz Programme	Ant & Dec's Gameshow Marathon
2007	Most Popular Entertainment Presenter	
2007	Most Popular Entertainment Programme	Ant & Dec's Saturday Night Takeaway
2007	Most Popular Reality Programme	I'm a Celebrity... Get Me Out of Here!
2008	Most Popular Entertainment Presenter	
2010	Most Popular Entertainment Presenter	
2010	Most Popular Entertainment Programme	Ant & Dec's Saturday Night Takeaway
2011	Most Popular Entertainment Presenter	
2011	Most Popular Entertainment Programme	I'm a Celebrity... Get Me Out of Here!
2012	Most Popular Entertainment Presenter	
2012	Most Popular Reality Programme	I'm a Celebrity... Get Me Out of Here!
2013	Most Popular Entertainment Presenter	
2013	Most Popular Entertainment Programme	I'm a Celebrity... Get Me Out of Here!
2014	Most Popular Entertainment Presenter	
2014	Most Popular Entertainment Programme	I'm a Celebrity... Get Me Out of Here!
2014	Landmark Award	
2015	Most Popular Entertainment Presenter	
2015	Most Popular Entertainment Programme	I'm a Celebrity... Get Me Out of Here!
2016	Most Popular Entertainment Programme	I'm a Celebrity... Get Me Out of Here!
2016	Most Popular TV Presenter	
2017	Most Popular Entertainment Programme	Ant & Dec's Saturday Night Takeaway
2017	Most Popular TV Presenter	
2017	Challenge Show	I'm a Celebrity... Get Me Out of Here!
2018	The Bruce Forsyth Entertainment Award	Ant & Dec's Saturday Night Takeaway
2018	Most Popular TV Presenter	
2018	Challenge Show	I'm a Celebrity... Get Me Out of Here!
2019	The Bruce Forsyth Entertainment Award	I'm a Celebrity... Get Me Out of Here!
2019	Most Popular TV Presenter	
2020	The Bruce Forsyth Entertainment Award	I'm a Celebrity... Get Me Out of Here!
2020	Most Popular TV Presenter	
2021	The Bruce Forsyth Entertainment Award	I'm a Celebrity... Get Me Out of Here!
2021	Most Popular TV Presenter	

== Filmography ==
=== Television ===
Year	Title	Role
1990–1993, 2000	Byker Grove	PJ
1994	Gimme 5	Guest presenter
1995–1997	The Ant & Dec Show	Co-Presenter
1995–1997	The Big Breakfast	Guest presenter
1997	Ant and Dec's Geordie Christmas	Co-Presenter
1998	Ant & Dec Unzipped	Co-Presenter
1998–2001	SMTV Live	Co-Presenter
1998–2001	CD:UK	Co-Presenter
1999–2001	Friends Like These	Co-Presenter
2001	Slap Bang with Ant & Dec	Co-Presenter
2001–2003	Pop Idol	Co-Presenter
2001, 2015–2016	Brit Awards	
2002	A Tribute to the Likely Lads	Terry Collier
2002–2004	Engie Benjy	Jollop and Trucker Troy (voice)
2002–2009, 2013–2018, 2020–2024	Ant & Dec's Saturday Night Takeaway	Co-Presenter
2002–2017, 2019–	I'm a Celebrity...Get Me Out of Here!	Co-Presenter
2005	Ant & Dec's Gameshow Marathon	Co-Presenter
2006	A History of Tyneside	Co-Presenter
2006–2007	PokerFace	Co-Presenter
2006, 2008	Soccer Aid	Co-Presenter
2007–present	Britain's Got Talent	Co-Presenter
2008	Wanna Bet?	Co-Presenter
2009	Ant & Dec's Christmas Show	Co-Presenter
2010–2011	Ant & Dec's Push the Button	Co-Presenter
2011–2012	Red or Black?	Co-Presenter
2011–2014	Text Santa	Co-Presenter
2016	When Ant and Dec Met The Prince: 40 Years of The Prince's Trust	Co-Presenter
2016	The Queen's 90th Birthday Celebration	Co-Presenter
2019	Britain's Got Talent: The Champions	Co-Presenter
2019	Ant & Dec's DNA Journey	Himself
2022–	Limitless Win	Co-Presenter

=== Film ===
Year	Title	Role
2003	Love Actually	Himself
2006	Alien Autopsy	Gary Shoefield
2013	One Chance	Himself (archive footage)

=== Television advertisements ===
Year	Title	Role
2000	Wispa Bite	Himself
2001	Ambrosia Splat	Himself, voice only
2001	Woolworths	Himself
2002	McDonald's	Himself, voice only
2008	Sainsbury's	Himself
2010–2011	Wii & Nintendo DS	Himself
2013–2015	Morrisons	Himself
2016–2018	Suzuki	Himself
2019–2020	Marks & Spencer	Himself
2019–present	Santander UK	Himself

=== Apps ===
- An official Saturday Night Takeaway app known as Studio Rush launched on 30 January 2013.

== Bibliography ==
- "The Media Guardian 100–65 Anthony McPartlin and Declan Donnelly". The Guardian. 9 July 2007. Archived from the original on 15 October 2007.
- "The Media Guardian 100–85 Anthony McPartlin and Declan Donnelly". The Guardian. 17 July 2006.
- "The Media Guardian 100–35 Anthony McPartlin and Declan Donnelly". The Guardian. 7 July 2003.
