= Declan Donnelly =

English television presenter (born 1975)

Declan Donnelly OBE
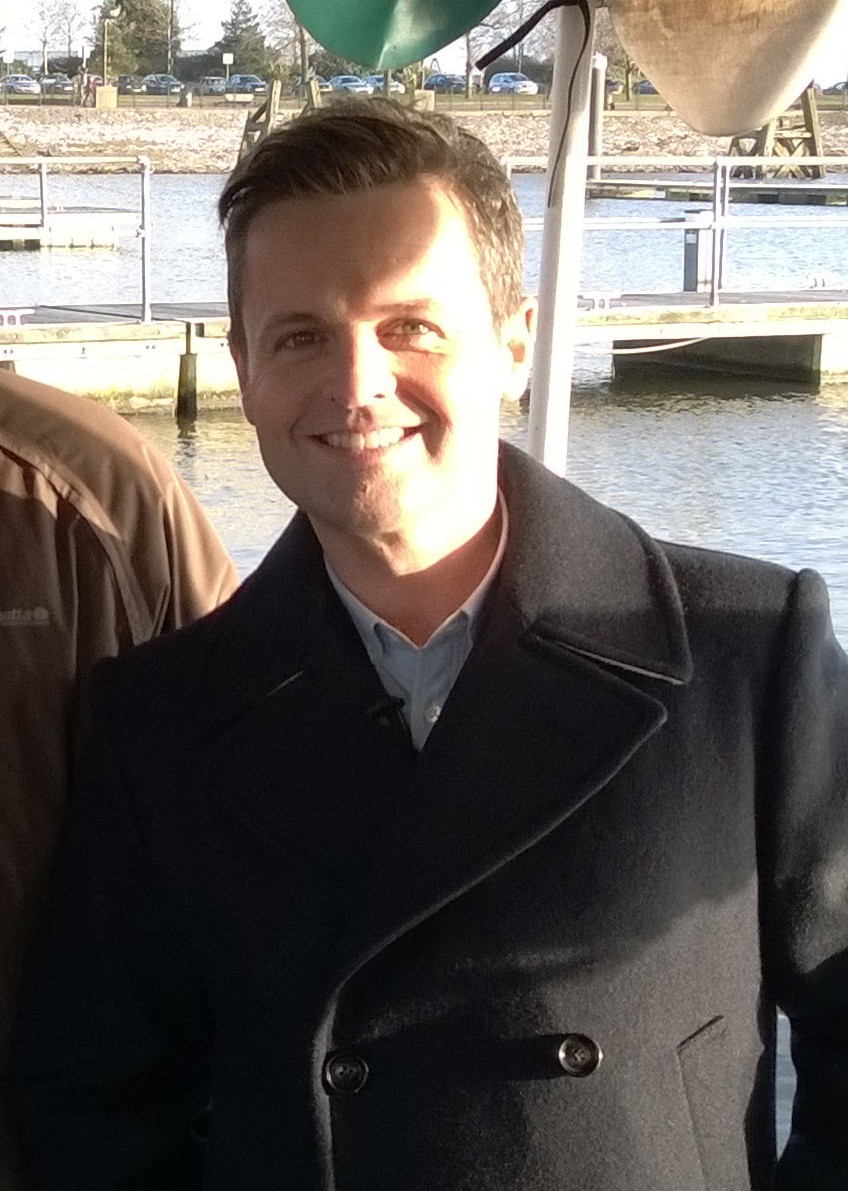
- Donnelly in 2014
- Born: Declan Joseph Oliver Donnelly; 25 September 1975 (age 51); Newcastle upon Tyne, England
- Education: St Michael's Roman Catholic Primary School; St Cuthbert's High School
- Occupations: Television presenter; television producer; former singer; comedian; actor; rapper
- Years active: 1987–present
- Spouse: Ali Astall (m. 2015)
- Partner: Clare Buckfield (1993–2003)
- Children: 2
- Declan Donnelly's voice from the BBC programme Desert Island Discs, 29 December 2013.
- Website: officialantanddec.com

Declan Joseph Oliver Donnelly (born 25 September 1975) is an English television presenter, television producer, comedian, former singer, rapper and actor. He is best known for working alongside Ant McPartlin as part of the presenting duo Ant & Dec.

Born in Newcastle upon Tyne, Donnelly came to prominence, alongside McPartlin, in the children's drama series Byker Grove, with both men establishing successful careers as television presenters, in which they are most known for presenting SMTV Live (between 1998 and 2001), I'm a Celebrity...Get Me Out of Here! alongside Ant McPartlin (2002–2017, 2019–) and Holly Willoughby (2018) and Ant & Dec's Saturday Night Takeaway (2002–2024), and Britain's Got Talent (since 2007).

Other notable highlights of Donnelly's career alongside McPartlin include presenting PokerFace, Push the Button, Pop Idol, and Red or Black?, being hosts of charity appeal Text Santa (between 2011 and 2014), and also performing as pop music duo PJ & Duncan.

== Early life ==
Donnelly is the child of parents Alphonsus Donnelly and Anne Donnelly, who originally resided in Desertmartin, Northern Ireland before moving to England in the 1950s, settling in Newcastle upon Tyne. He is youngest of seven children the couple raised within the council estate of Cruddas Park.

Donnelly's education took place first at St Michael's Roman Catholic Primary School, and later at the all-boys St Cuthbert's High School, with him receiving 8 GCSEs. Although he eventually moved towards a career in television, he originally considered becoming a Catholic priest but changed his mind upon seeing the students from the all-girls Sacred Heart Catholic High School.

== Career ==
Donnelly's career in television began at the age of 12, when his father suggested that he audition for Byker Grove, a new children's television programme being created by CBBC in Newcastle upon Tyne that had been advertised in local newspapers. His success in this audition led to him securing the role of Duncan, whereupon he first met Anthony McPartlin. Although he was raised in an estate close to Donnelly, McPartlin had never met him until their involvement in the children's drama. The pair worked together on the show until their eventual departure in 1993, whereupon they began to bond as friends, both socially and professionally.

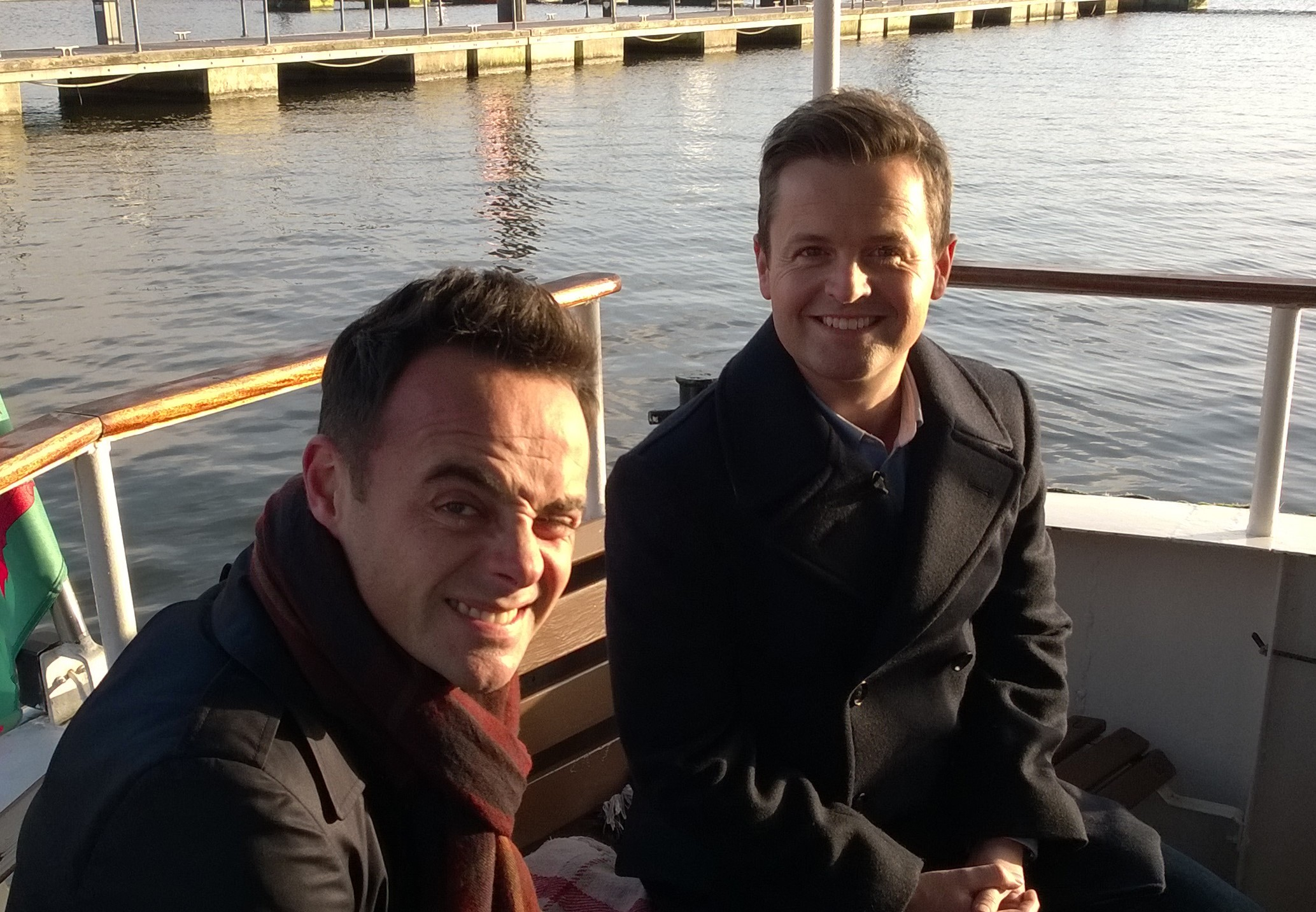
Donnelly (right) with Ant McPartlin (left) in 2014

After a short tenure in music, Donnelly and McPartlin furthered their careers in television by becoming the presenting duo Ant & Dec. Having already fronted Children's TV show 'The Ant and Dec show' on BBC1, which ran for 2 series, followed by a stint on Channel 4 with the edgier 'Ant & Dec Unzipped', The pair continued to work in children's television, fronting ITV's Saturday morning children's programme SMTV Live. After leaving the programme in 2001, the pair branched out to front other shows, including game shows – Friends Like These, PokerFace and Push the Button – talent shows – Pop Idol, and Britain's Got Talent – and entertainment programmes – I'm a Celebrity...Get Me Out of Here!, and Ant & Dec's Saturday Night Takeaway. The pair continued to maintain acting careers, starring in a tribute to The Likely Lads in 2002, in the form of a remake of an episode from the show's sequel Whatever Happened to the Likely Lads?, entitled "No Hiding Place", and in 2006 film Alien Autopsy.

Ant & Dec have their own production company Mitre Television where they produce their shows.

== Personal life ==
On 22 July 2006, Donnelly was the best man for McPartlin's wedding to Lisa Armstrong. Donnelly reprised his role as McPartlin's best man when he married his second wife, Anne-Marie Corbett on 7 August 2021. In an 'emotional' speech on the special day, he described McPartlin as the "best friend a man could have" before reading a prayer in front of the guests attending.

In August 2011, Donnelly attended his father's funeral, after Alphonsus died in hospital of cancer.

Donnelly dated actress Clare Buckfield for ten years between 1993 and 2003, and television presenter Georgie Thompson from January 2009 until April 2011.

On 13 November 2014, Donnelly became engaged to the duo's manager, Ali Astall, with whom he had been in a relationship for over a year, with the marriage taking place at St Michael's Roman Catholic Church, Elswick, Tyne and Wear, on 1 August 2015. The ceremony was conducted by his brother, Father Dermott Donnelly, a Catholic priest, with McPartlin as his best man. On 1 September 2018, after announcing earlier in the year that the couple were expecting their first child, Donnelly's wife gave birth to their daughter, Isla.

On 19 March 2018, after his colleague McPartlin's car crash, it was announced that Donnelly would be presenting the remaining episodes of Ant & Dec's Saturday Night Takeaway and the live semi-finals of Britain's Got Talent on his own.

In November 2019, it was revealed that Dec is a distant cousin of the American professional wrestling promoter and businesswoman Dixie Carter. He is also related to footballer Aaron Donnelly. His elder brother Dermott died after a short illness on 8 July 2022 at age 55.

Donnelly has stated that he is a practising Roman Catholic but does not publicly discuss religion or his family in depth.

On 23 July 2022, Donnelly and Astall welcomed their second child, a boy, Jack. In a 'sweet' gesture, the couple gave their son middle names 'Anthony' and 'Alphonsus' in honour of Donnelly's best friend McPartlin and late father respectively.

== Charity ==
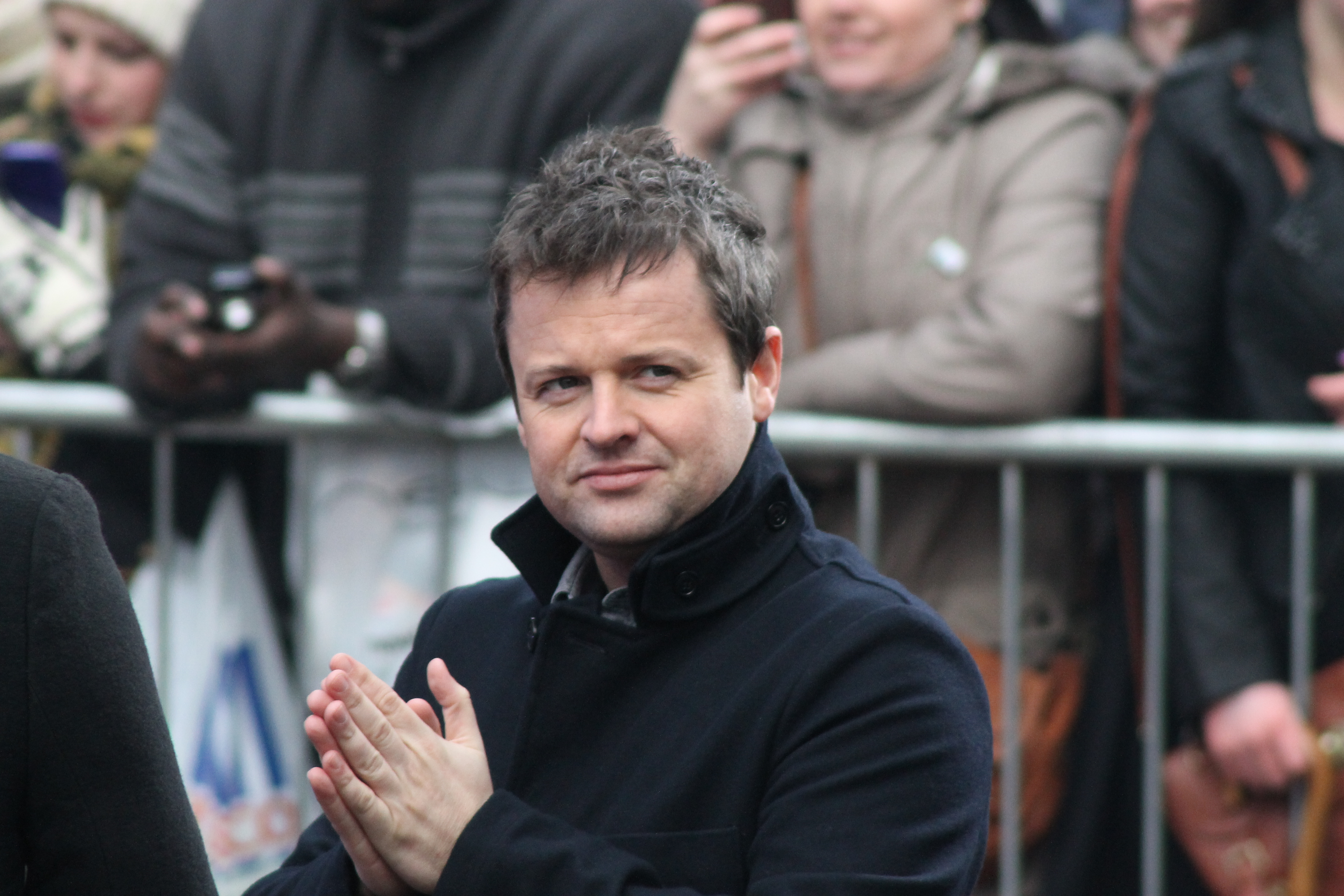
Donnelly in January 2012

Donnelly and McPartlin are patrons of the charity Sunshine Fund. When their single "Let's Get Ready to Rhumble" reached No.1 in 2012, Ant & Dec donated the single's success to the charity ChildLine. They also support the Text Santa appeal.

Donnelly also supports the Diocese of Hexham and Newcastle's Youth Ministry Team, directed by one of his older brothers, Dermott Donnelly, former dean of St Mary's Cathedral in Newcastle. They opened the W4 Youth Centre in 2013.

== Earnings ==
In 2002, Ant & Dec signed a two-year golden handcuffs deal with ITV, worth £2m.

In 2004, they signed their third golden handcuffs deal with ITV, running until the end of 2007.

In April 2007, the duo signed a two-year golden handcuffs deal with ITV, reportedly worth £30–40 million, securing their career at the station until the end of 2009.

In 2009, they extended their golden handcuffs deal for two years. In 2011, they extended their golden handcuffs deal for two years.

In November 2016, the pair signed a new three-year deal with ITV, estimated to be worth £30 million over 3 years.

== Honours and awards ==
Donnelly was appointed an Officer of the Order of the British Empire (OBE) in the 2016 Birthday Honours for services to broadcasting and entertainment.

The following listed below are the television awards that Donnelly has been nominated for or awarded with, primarily while working alongside Anthony McPartlin as Ant & Dec:

1994

- Brit Award Nomination – Best Song: "Let's Get Ready to Rhumble"

1995

- Brit Award Nomination – British Breakthrough
- Royal Television Society Awards- The Ant and Dec Show

1996

- British Academy Children's Awards: Children's Entertainment Show (The Ant and Dec Show)

1997

- Nominated – British Academy Children's Awards: Children's Entertainment Show (The Ant and Dec Show)

1998

- British Academy Children's Awards: Children's Entertainment Show (Ant and Dec Unzipped)

2000

- British Academy Children's Awards: Children's Entertainment Show (SMTV Live)
- TV Choice Awards: Best Children's Show (SMTV Live)
- Royal Television Society Awards: Best Children's Entertainment Programme (SMTV Live)
- TV Hits Awards: Best Teen Show (CD:UK)
- Loaded Carling Good Work Fellas Awards: Best Double Act
- British Comedy Awards: The People's Choice (SMTV Live)

2001

- TV Choice Awards: Best Children's Show (SMTV Live)
- Broadcast Awards: Best Children's Programme (SMTV Live)
- Royal Television Society Awards : Best Television Presenters
- Disney Channel Awards: Kids Awards (The Ant and Dec Show)
- Nominated – British Academy Children's Awards: Best Children's Entertainment Show (SMTV Live)

2002

- Nominated – British Academy Television Awards: Entertainment Performance (Pop Idol)
- British Academy Children's Awards: Children's Entertainment Show (SMTV Live)

2005

- Nominated – British Academy Television Awards: Entertainment Performance (I'm a Celebrity... Get Me Out of Here!)

2006

- British Comedy Awards: Best Comedy Entertainment Personality
- British Comedy Awards: Best Comedy Entertainment Programme

2007

- Nominated – British Academy Television Awards: Entertainment Performance (Ant & Dec's Saturday Night Takeaway)

2008

- TV Quick & TV Choice Awards: Best Entertainment Show (Saturday Night Takeaway)
- Nickelodeon UK Kids Choice Awards 2008: Favourite Funny Person, Best TV presenters and Best Family TV show (Britain's Got Talent)

2009

- TV Quick & TV Choice Awards: Best Entertainment Show (Ant & Dec's Saturday Night Takeaway)
- TV Quick & TV Choice Awards:Outstanding Contribution Award
- Nominated – British Academy Television Awards: Entertainment Performance (I'm a Celebrity... Get Me Out of Here!)

2010

- British Academy Television Awards: Entertainment Performance (I'm a Celebrity... Get Me Out of Here!)
- British Academy Television Awards: Entertainment Programme (Britain's Got Talent)

2012

- Freesat: Best TV Presenter(s)

2013

- TRIC Awards: TV Personality of the Year
- TRIC Awards: TRIC Special Award (I'm a Celebrity... Get Me Out of Here!)
- RTS Awards: Entertainment Performance (I'm a Celebrity... Get Me Out of Here!)
- Nominated – British Academy Television Awards: Entertainment Performance (I'm a Celebrity... Get Me Out of Here!)

2014

- British Academy Television Awards: Entertainment Performance (Ant & Dec's Saturday Night Takeaway)
- British Academy Television Awards: Entertainment Programme (Ant & Dec's Saturday Night Takeaway)

2015

- British Academy Television Awards: Entertainment Performance (Ant & Dec's Saturday Night Takeaway)
- British Academy Television Awards: Entertainment Programme (Ant & Dec's Saturday Night Takeaway)

2017

- British Academy Television Awards: Entertainment Programme (Ant & Dec's Saturday Night Takeaway)
- British Academy Television Awards: Live Event (The Queen's 90th Birthday Celebration)

2018

- British Academy Television Awards: Entertainment Programme (Britain's Got Talent)

2019

- Guinness World Records: Most NTA's for Best Presenter won consecutively at 18
- British Academy Television Awards: Entertainment Programme (Britain's Got Talent)
- British Academy Television Awards: Reality And Constructed Factual Programme (I'm A Celebrity... Get Me Out Of Here!)

=== National Television Awards ===
Year	Award	Show
2001	Most Popular Entertainment Presenter	
2002	Most Popular Entertainment Presenter	
2002	Most Popular Entertainment Programme	Pop Idol
2002	Special Recognition Award	
2003	Most Popular Entertainment Presenter	
2003	Most Popular Entertainment Programme	Ant & Dec's Saturday Night Takeaway
2003	Most Popular Reality Programme	I'm a Celebrity... Get Me Out of Here!
2004	Most Popular Entertainment Presenter	
2004	Most Popular Entertainment Programme	Ant & Dec's Saturday Night Takeaway
2005	Most Popular Entertainment Presenter	
2006	Most Popular Entertainment Presenter	
2006	Most Popular Quiz Programme	Ant & Dec's Gameshow Marathon
2007	Most Popular Entertainment Presenter	
2007	Most Popular Entertainment Programme	Ant & Dec's Saturday Night Takeaway
2007	Most Popular Reality Programme	I'm a Celebrity... Get Me Out of Here!
2008	Most Popular Entertainment Presenter	
2010	Most Popular Entertainment Presenter	
2010	Most Popular Entertainment Programme	Ant & Dec's Saturday Night Takeaway
2011	Most Popular Entertainment Presenter	
2011	Most Popular Entertainment Programme	I'm a Celebrity... Get Me Out of Here!
2012	Most Popular Entertainment Presenter	
2012	Most Popular Reality Programme	I'm a Celebrity... Get Me Out of Here!
2013	Most Popular Entertainment Presenter	
2013	Most Popular Entertainment Programme	I'm a Celebrity... Get Me Out of Here!
2014	Most Popular Entertainment Presenter	
2014	Most Popular Entertainment Programme	I'm a Celebrity... Get Me Out of Here!
2014	Landmark Award	
2015	Most Popular Entertainment Presenter	
2015	Most Popular Entertainment Programme	I'm a Celebrity... Get Me Out of Here!
2016	Most Popular Entertainment Programme	I'm a Celebrity... Get Me Out of Here!
2016	Most Popular TV Presenter	
2017	Most Popular Entertainment Programme	Ant & Dec's Saturday Night Takeaway
2017	Most Popular TV Presenter	
2017	Challenge Show	I'm a Celebrity... Get Me Out of Here!
2018	The Bruce Forsyth Entertainment Award	Ant & Dec's Saturday Night Takeaway
2018	Challenge Show	I'm a Celebrity... Get Me Out of Here!
2018	Most Popular TV Presenter	
2019	The Bruce Forsyth Entertainment Award	I'm a Celebrity... Get Me Out of Here!
2019	Most Popular TV Presenter	
2020	The Bruce Forsyth Entertainment Award	I'm a Celebrity... Get Me Out of Here!
2020	Most Popular TV Presenter	
2021	The Bruce Forsyth Entertainment Award	I'm a Celebrity... Get Me Out of Here!
2021	Most Popular TV Presenter	

== Filmography ==
=== Television ===
Year	Title	Role	Notes
1989–1993, 2000	Byker Grove	Duncan	
1994	Gimme 5	Guest co-presenter	
1995–1997	The Ant & Dec Show	Co-presenter	
1995–1997	The Big Breakfast	Co-presenter	
1997	Ant and Dec's Geordie Christmas	Co-presenter	
1998	Ant & Dec Unzipped	Co-presenter	
1998–2001	SMTV Live	Co-presenter	Alongside Cat Deeley and Ant McPartlin
1998–2001	CD:UK	Co-presenter	
1999–2001	Friends Like These	Co-presenter	Alongside Ant McPartlin
2001	Slap Bang with Ant & Dec	Co-presenter	
2001–2003	Pop Idol	Co-presenter	
2001, 2015–2016	Brit Awards	Co-presenter	
2002	A Tribute to the Likely Lads	Himself	
2002–2004	Engie Benjy	Engie Benjy (voice)	
2002–2009, 2013–2018, 2020–2024	Ant & Dec's Saturday Night Takeaway	Co-Presenter	
2002–	I'm a Celebrity...Get Me Out of Here!	Co-Presenter	Alongside Ant McPartlin (2002–2017, 2019–), Holly Willoughby (2018)
2005	Ant & Dec's Gameshow Marathon	Co-Presenter	
2006	A History of Tyneside	Co-Presenter	
2006–2007	PokerFace	Co-Presenter	
2006, 2008	Soccer Aid	Co-Presenter	
2007–	Britain's Got Talent	Co-Presenter	
2008	Wanna Bet?	Co-Presenter	
2009	Ant & Dec's Christmas Show	Co-Presenter	
2010–2011	Ant & Dec's Push the Button	Co-Presenter	
2011–2012	Red or Black?	Co-Presenter	
2011–2014	Text Santa	Co-Presenter	
2016	When Ant and Dec Met The Prince: 40 Years of The Prince's Trust	Co-Presenter	
2016	The Queen's 90th Birthday Celebration	Co-Presenter	
2019	Britain's Got Talent: The Champions	Co-Presenter	
2019	Ant & Dec's DNA Journey	Himself	
2022–	Limitless Win	Co-Presenter	
2023	Ant & Dec's Saturday Night Takeaway: Behind the Scenes	Co-Presenter	
2023	I'm a Celebrity... South Africa	Co–presenter	Alongside Anthony McPartlin (2023)

=== Film ===
Year	Title	Role
2003	Love Actually	Himself
2006	Alien Autopsy	Ray Santilli
2013	One Chance	Himself (archive footage)

=== Television advertisements ===
Year	Title	Role
2000	Wispa Bite	Himself
2001	Ambrosia Splat	Himself, voice only
2001	Woolworths	Himself
2002	McDonald's	Himself, voice only
2008	Sainsbury's	Himself
2010–2011	Nintendo Wii & DS	Himself
2013–2015	Morrisons	Himself
2016–2018	Suzuki	Himself
2019–2020	Marks & Spencer	Himself
2019–present	Santander Bank	Himself

=== Apps ===
- An official Saturday Night Takeaway app known as Studio Rush launched on 30 January 2013 but has been removed.
- An official I'm a Celebrity, Get Me Out of Here! app launched on 9 November 2015.
