= Slap Bang with Ant & Dec =

- Starring: Ant & Dec
- Country of origin: United Kingdom
- Original language: English
- No. of series: 1
- No. of episodes: 6

Production
- Running time: 60mins (inc. adverts)
- Production companies: Blaze Television (for LWT)

Original release
- Network: ITV
- Release: 12 May – 16 June 2001

Related
- Ant & Dec's Saturday Night Takeaway

Slap Bang with Ant & Dec is a television programme broadcast in the United Kingdom on ITV. It was presented by Ant & Dec and aired for six episodes from 12 May to 16 June 2001.

== History ==
The show ran for six episodes (shown weekly, on Saturdays). The title is Slap Bang because, as Dec put it, "it happens slap bang in the middle of your weekend." During the course of the series the rating continued to drop to 2.9 million on its final airing. ITV said they had been happy with Ant and Dec's first venture into prime time TV.

It was later acknowledged that the pair had a second series with 18 episodes guaranteed written into their contract.

== Segments ==
=== Beers ===
Each episode featured, among other things, a brief sketch of a show called Beers, a parody of Cheers, centred on a pub. Beers opened with a depressing song:

There's a place I know where the people go when they're really feeling low,
Though they serve flat ale and the crisps went stale about a year ago.
You really shouldn't go because you won't come back again!
The happy hour is only from 10 to 5 past 10.
The lager's warm and the wine is brown,
(The next line is more or less inaudible)
Even the water is watered down at Beers.
You shouldn't go because you won't come back again.

The sequence of images accompanying this song ended with a sign being held up saying, "We lose".

Beers was similar to Chums, a parody of Friends that appeared on SMTV Live, and also featured Ant & Dec. They were similar in the respect that each began with a phrase of the form, "Beers/Chums is filmed ...", e.g. "Chums is filmed - why?" However, Beers lacked the cliffhangers of Chums.

=== Challenge Ant ===
Carrying over from SMTV Live, each episode featured a chosen member from the audience asking Ant questions. Each one Ant got wrong earned the contestant a prize. The audience member could then gamble all their winnings on one final question, winning a bonus if Ant gave an incorrect answer. If Ant gave the correct answer, the contestant walked home with nothing.

=== Loose Change Lottery ===
The audience members all, if they wished, contributed loose change into a bucket prior to the show, and were each given a number. At the end of the show, whoever's number Dec drew out of a spinning drum won the whole jackpot.

=== Formula 6 1/2 ===
In F6½, the contestants were in pedal go karts and were all around six-and-a-half years old. Dec played Grim Rosenthal and Ant played a different variation on Murray Walker every week: Murray Babywalker, Murray Sleepwalker, Murray Skywalker (complete with lightsabre), Murray Tightropewalker, Murray Speedwalker ("And look at me go!") etc. The four 'drivers' were called Michael Pre-school-macher, Teddy Irvine, Johnny Sherbet and Jenson Chocolate Button. They all got to go to the British Grand Prix and meet their real-life counterparts, while Ant & Dec were guests on ITV's coverage, where Jim Rosenthal had a go at them about the Grim Rosenthal character ("I'm deeply upset. You got my hairstyle wrong!")

Viewers at home who answered a phone-in question correctly could win a prize if the driver they chose to sponsor won the race.

=== Cher and Cher Alike/The Witch Blair Project ===
One person was plucked out of the audience and asked to identify which of three hairstyles on the big screen was sported by Cher at some point during her career. After five out of the series' six episodes, they ran out of hair styles but, rather than make up a new game, they simply re-titled it The Which Blair Project, and asked the contestant to guess which hairstyle belonged to a young Tony Blair. If the audience champion (as Dec called them) got it right, the entire audience won a prize such as free video rental, free music vouchers, etc.

In the Blair game, the two hairstyles not belonging to Tony Blair belonged to Cherie Blair and former Name That Tune host Lionel Blair.

=== At Home with the Stars ===
This was a comedy segment used to bridge other segments, featuring a star such as Carol Vorderman talking to various people on the phone, all admitting that they can't tell which one is Ant and which one is Dec, in spite of the fact the pair follow the 180-degree rule; all TV appearances and publicity photos have Ant on the left and Dec on the right. This was referencing all people in real life who couldn't tell the two apart.

=== Donnelly ===
Dec's "chat show within a show" where he'd interview a celebrity guest, often to have Ant or someone else interrupt or make things hard for him, only to make him look more unprofessional in the end. The problems depended on the guest; for instance William Roache, a soap opera actor, made a soap opera out of the whole thing when Ant and Dec kept getting his name wrong. This was evident when he got back up and snapped at Dec after lying on the floor, after Dec appeared to have killed him with a gun.
