= SMTV Live =

Saturday Morning Kids Programme

- Presented by: Ant & Dec; Cat Deeley; Brian Dowling; Tess Daly; James Redmond; Ian "H" Watkins; Claire Richards; Shavaughn Ruakere; Des Clarke; Stephen Mulhern
- Country of origin: United Kingdom
- Original language: English
- No. of seasons: 6
- No. of episodes: 279

Production
- Executive producer: Conor McAnally
- Producers: David Staite; Steve Pinhay
- Production locations: Studio 2, The London Studios (1998–2003); Studios 1 & 2, Riverside Studios (2003)
- Running time: 125 mins
- Production company: Blaze Television

Original release
- Network: ITV
- Release: 29 August 1998 – 27 December 2003

SMTV Live (an abbreviation of Saturday Morning Television Live, and also stylised as SM:tv LIVE), simply known as SMTV, is a British Saturday morning children's television programme, produced by Blaze Television for ITV. Operating on a similar format to other Saturday morning programmes for children, such as BBC's Live & Kicking, the programme premiered on 29 August 1998 and ran for 279 episodes across five years, before its conclusion on 27 December 2003.

The programme's format focused on a collection of sketches, competitions and challenges, alongside a compilation of children's programmes and cartoons. The programme proved a major success, contributing to furthering the careers of Ant McPartlin and Declan Donnelly under the partnership of Ant & Dec, as well as promoting the broadcast of Japanese anime series Pokémon on British television. SMTV Live became notable for various elements, including sketches based on Pokémon, the phone competition of "Wonkey Donkey", and the late morning edition of CD:UK that the presenters of the programme were involved in towards the end of the morning schedule. The programme was regularly popular with its audiences, attracting around 2.5 million viewers.

Following its conclusion, Ant & Dec's former company Gallowgate Holdings Limited retained the rights to the show. In April 2017, the duo made a proposal for a 20th anniversary special to reunite them with co-presenter Cat Deeley, but despite an announcement of it being revived during the 2017 British Academy Television Awards, ITV later stated that the proposal had been dropped.

On 26 December 2020, a one-off reunion documentary aired on ITV under the title The Story of SM:TV Live, featuring Ant, Dec and Cat reminiscing on their time on the show.

The programme's Friends parody sketch "Chums" was recreated for the fifth episode of series 17 of Ant & Dec's Saturday Night Takeaway on 20 March 2021.

== Format ==
SMTV Live operated on a live-television format for its timeslot on Saturday. Alongside the involvement of audience of children and celebrity guests - including bands - the programme mostly consisted of studio segments that were interwoven around children's programming, used over the course of the show's two hour timeslot. Studio segments frequently included sketches by the presenters, competitions (including phone-ins), and other features.

=== Programming ===
- The Twisted Tales of Felix the Cat (1998)
- The Angry Beavers (1998–99)
- Animaniacs (1998–99)
- Cow and Chicken (1998–99)
- Dexter's Laboratory (1998–99)
- I Am Weasel (1998–99)
- Sabrina the Teenage Witch (1998–2003)
- The New Addams Family (1999)
- Power Rangers Turbo (1999)
- Power Rangers in Space (1999)
- The Worst Witch (1999)
- Pokémon (1999–2001, 2003)
- Clueless (1999–02)
- Digimon (2000–01)
- Bernard's Watch (2001)
- Scooby-Doo (2001)
- My Parents Are Aliens (2001)
- Starstreet (2001)
- Hey Arnold! (2001–02)
- Don't Eat the Neighbours (2002)
- Becoming (2002)
- Men in Black: The Series (2002)
- Popstars Ireland (2002)
- Sitting Ducks (2002)
- The Adventures of Jimmy Neutron, Boy Genius (2002–03)
- All Grown Up! (2003)
- The Flintstones (2003)
- Girls in Love (2003)
- SpongeBob SquarePants (2003)
- That's So Raven (2003)

=== Sketches ===
Presenters often conducted a variety of sketches on the programme during SMTV Live's broadcast. Most were performed by McPartlin and Donnelly, with assistance from Deeley, with many often being parodies of programmes airing between 1998 and 2003. The most prominent sketches used on the programme included:

- "Dec Says" - The sketch revolved around Donnelly answering a letter from a fictional viewer about a personal problem in which he would recount how he handled a similar issue in the past. However, the scene would often be depicted in a flashback recalled differently by McPartlin. The "real story" featured Donnelly portrayed as an inconsiderate, cheeky schoolboy referred to as "Downright Dirty Donnelly" who often got into trouble with the relevant problem, often with a character portrayed by the celebrity guest(s) for that week's episode. Deeley often appeared, portraying herself as a schoolgirl with very messy hair, huge teeth, and a strong Birmingham accent (an example of the accent being the line "it's ever so different from Bir-ming-ham!") who was referred to as "Cat the Dog", while McPartlin occasionally appeared, portrayed as an overweight boy who ate huge amounts of food and referred to as "Gi-ant".
- The sketch later was renamed "The Secret of My Success", and after McPartlin and Donnelly left the programme, the sketch was revised again under the title of "The Further Adventures of Cat the Dog", in which the flashback scenes were often bookended with Cat writing in her diary about the events of the day.
- "Chums" - A parody of the American sitcom Friends and one of the show's signature features, introduced in August 1999. The sitcom involved Donnelly and Deeley in a fictional romance, dealing with McPartlin and a weekly problem, often joined by the celebrity guest(s) for that week's episode either as themselves or a character. The sketch opened on a parody version of the line "... is filmed in front of a live studio audience", and ending on a "freeze-frame" moment (a homage to the closing sequences of Police Squad!). Although acting as a serial, plotlines were stand-alone and not interconnected, with the exception of the fictional romance between Donnelly and Deeley. The sketch later spawned a VHS compilation and weekday repeats as part of CITV. Chums continued for a few weeks after the departure of Ant & Dec before ending its run.
- In March 2021, to celebrate the 20th anniversary of its final episode, "Chums" was revived for a one-off live episode as part of the "End-of-the-Show Show" on Ant & Dec's Saturday Night Takeaway.
- "PokéRap" and "Pokéfight" - These sketches were based upon the programme's regular broadcasts of Pokémon, and were conducted primarily by McPartlin and Donnelly between 1999 and 2001. The rap sketches mainly involved the pair acting as rappers and conducting raps that featured the names of various Pokémon, while each wearing a knitted Pokémon jumper that featured both Pikachu and their own name upon it. The feature later developed with the addition of a weekly letters' segment with viewers sending in their own raps (mostly via home video), and the eventual participation of the celebrity guest(s) for that week's episode.
- The fight sketch also mainly involved McPartlin and Donnelly, and was the creation of the show's writers after being inspired by the cartoon series. The presenters portrayed different parody version of the anime's main characters, in which they fought using "Pokémon" named after the moves they performed on each other - an example of this was "Embarrassmon" which involved one dueller telling a secret about the other, which damaged their health as a result. The sketch often involved a graphic overlay, that was reminiscent of the video game of Pokémon.
- "Eminemmerdale" - A parody of the American rapper Eminem and the Yorkshire Television soap opera Emmerdale.

=== Main features ===
Alongside sketches, the programme also featured a mixture of competitions - both phone-ins and studio-based - and other segments. Competition prizes differed from those offered by other Saturday morning children's programmes, by including more valuable items on offer including holidays. Amongst these segments that were used, the most notable included:

- "Postbag" - A segment for reading out viewer fan mail, which often began with the presenters, guests and audience dancing to the song "Please Mr. Postman" by The Carpenters. The segment featured three notable events during the tenure of McPartlin and Donnelly:
  - During the episode broadcast on 1 April 2000, Donnelly pulled off an April Fool's joke by pretending to be slightly ill when opening the segment and passing out unconscious. A few seconds after this, the programme began airing the second half of a cartoon, before later returning after a commercial break to Donnelly revealing the truth. A later interview with both himself and McPartlin later revealed the joke had been devised to coincide with the date, but had been unplanned and frowned upon by ITV.
  - McPartlin once read out a crude anecdote sent in by a viewer, that caused him to fall into uncontrollable laughing alongside his co-presenter. The incident later was retained as a clip on the consideration that it appeared to be in the similar format of an "outtake".
  - One letter sent to the presenters concerned the pronunciation of the word "Pokémon" and asked that it be pronounced as "Po-KAY-mon". However, when the second half of the Pokémon episode "Bulbasaur and the Hidden Village" included the pronunciation the presenters had used, Donnelly paused the episode to review the moment before making a small rant to camera about the letter and then ripping it up before allowing the episode to resume. It was not made clear if the incident had been a stunt and intended to make a point on the subject.
- Magic - Many episodes featured the guest appearance of various magicians, who conducted small and large-scale illusions on the programme. These illusions often involved the participation of Deeley as an assistant, in which she commonly was involved in the "Sawing a woman in half" illusion. After Deeley left in 2002, her replacement Tess Daly took over to act as assistant on later illusions performed on SMTV Live.
- "Wonkey Donkey" - A phone-in competition for viewers to partake in, which operated in a similar manner to that of Catchphrase, but required contestants to answer with two words that rhymed together to match the object they showed - a golden rule of the competition. For example, the game's name itself of "Wonkey Donkey" pertained to describe the state of a small toy donkey which had one leg missing. Before contestants began, the presenters would showcase something similar, before taking calls from up to five viewers. Donnelly frequently often ranted in "anger" to camera when a young contestant couldn't get the answer, with the game often notable for featuring presenters using the catchphrase of "It's gotta rhyme!" As a rule, if none of the callers answered correctly, the competition would roll over to the next week - if after three weeks, no one had answered correctly, the object involved would be abandoned for a new one. The competition was later referenced on subsequent ITV series, receiving a mock version on Britain's Got More Talent and Celebrity Juice.
- "Challenge Ant" - A studio competition in which one of the young audience members would be challenged by Donnelly to give McPartlin ten questions they had prepared, usually based on that week's showbiz news. Each question he failed to answer correctly within a time-limit of ten seconds would result in the child winning a prize. Once the ten questions had been given, Donnelly would offer the contestant a chance to gamble their prizes on a star prize, in which they asked McPartlin a further question - if answered incorrectly, the contestant would win all their prizes, but if answered correctly, the prizes and star prize would be put up for offer in a viewers' competition. Later episodes later gave the child contestant a consolation prize of a handkerchief reading "I lost on Challenge Ant", along with celebrity editions of the contest. After McPartlin and Donnelly left the programme, Deeley took over the contest under the title of Brian's Brain", challenging children to defeat Brian Dowling under the same format, with Daly taking over in 2002.
- "Eat My Goal" - A phone-in competition - which used the Collapsed Lung song of the same name as its theme music - in which viewers chose a celebrity, who would proceed to take penalties against McPartlin in goal while Donnelly hosted the contest. The format was amended with Dowling as the goalkeeper in 2001, with Daly and later Stephen Mulhern hosting the competition. In 2003, the format was changed to a different celebrity each week representing two teams taking it in turns to be goalkeeper.

=== CD:UK ===
After broadcasts of SMTV Live, the show was followed by CD:UK (an abbreviation of CountDown United Kingdom). The programme took place within the same studio (and initially with the same presenters), and operated on its own live-television format, featuring bands in the UK Singles Chart, music videos, and interviews with famous music stars. The programme continued after SMTV Live concluded, finally ending in April 2006.

== Production ==
=== Presenters ===
Both SMTV Live and CD:UK were originally hosted by Byker Grove stars Ant & Dec alongside former fashion model Cat Deeley. In 2001, Ant & Dec left the show to present Saturday night talent show Pop Idol and were replaced by Hollyoaks star James Redmond. Redmond's stint at SMTV and CD:UK lasted just under three months, however, after show bosses decided he had not settled into the role. Deeley left the show during the same period as Redmond's abrupt departure to focus on presenting BBC talent show Fame Academy (though would remain as the primary host of CD:UK for three further years), leaving SMTV with none of its original presenters. For the remainder of its time on the air, it was hosted by a string of other presenters, including Steps members Ian "H" Watkins and Claire Richards, Big Brother winner Brian Dowling, Tess Daly who presented from 2002, until all four had eventually left by August 2003. Comedian Des Clarke, New Zealand actress Shavaughn Ruakere and magician Stephen Mulhern presented the show for its final run, which was renamed SMTV Gold and concentrated on highlights from the show's history.

=== Writers and producers ===
The first month of the show was produced by former Top of the Pops producer Ric Blaxill. He was subsequently replaced by Steve Pinhay, whilst Phil Mount was brought in as producer of CD:UK. From 1999 until 2003, SMTV Live was produced by David Staite, with Blaze Television's director of programmes Conor McAnally acting as its executive producer.

During its first year, the show was written by Richard Preddy and Gary Howe. From September 1999, Ben Ward and Gerard Foster were brought over from rival BBC Saturday morning show Live & Kicking to work on semi-scripted features including Chums. Multi award-winning writer Dean Wilkinson penned material for the show throughout most of its run.

== Cancellation and final episode ==
In August 2003, after two years of declining ratings following the departure of Ant & Dec, ITV announced the cancellation of SMTV Live, to be replaced by an as-yet untitled programme featuring "games, sketches, music and acquired programming, with increased interactive elements." CD:UK, however, would remain for the time being. Steven Andrew, ITV's controller of children's programmes, said: "After five fantastic years of SM:TV we all recognised it was time for a change. We have gone for a show that is all about fun with a team with bags of fresh ideas. I'm confident the new show, teamed with CD:UK, will be a compelling proposition for kids." The replacement show became Ministry of Mayhem.

The programme marked the end of its five-year run with a series of SMTV Gold specials, featuring highlights from the show and cartoons, presented by Stephen Mulhern and Des Clarke with different celebrity co-hosts each week. The Gold series ended on 20 December 2003, with the very last SMTV Live programme airing on Saturday 27 December 2003, recorded at the Riverside Studios in Hammersmith, having moved from its original location at The London Studios. At one point, the Gold episodes were broadcast on Saturday afternoons because of morning coverage of the 2003 Rugby World Cup.

== Video releases ==
The series spawned two video releases. The first release, Chums, was released on November 20, 2000 by Contender Entertainment Group and featured six full Chums episodes and a selection of other SMTV comedy segments.

A second release, The Best of SMTV Live - So Far!, was released on November 19, 2001 by Universal Pictures (UK) Ltd and featured specially produced links recorded shortly before Ant & Dec's departure and an extended compilation of sketches and segments.

== Awards ==
SMTV Live was twice voted Best Entertainment Programme at the BAFTA Children's Film and Television Awards (2000 & 2002) and won BAFTA & British Comedy awards voted for by the public.

Ant & Dec won the Royal Television Society award for best presenter in 2001 for their work on the programme, while Cat Deeley won the BAFTA for best children's presenter in the same year.

In 2014, it was in 5th place for Channel 5's 50 Greatest Kids TV Shows.

In 2001, it finished 27th place in a Channel 4 poll for the 100 Greatest Kids' TV Shows.

== Reunion episode ==
On 4 September 2020, Ant & Dec revealed in an interview on BBC Radio 2 that they had filmed a one-off reunion episode with Deeley, in which the three of them would look back at SMTV's best bits. The following week, Deeley told The Chris Moyles Show that they went back to where the original show was filmed and producers rebuilt the old set. Later that month, Ant & Dec shared a teaser on Instagram. ITV confirmed that the reunion show would air on 26 December 2020 as The Story of SM:TV Live.
