= Friends Like These =

- Genre: Game show
- Presented by: Ant & Dec; Ian Wright
- Voices of: Mitch Johnson
- Country of origin: United Kingdom
- Original language: English
- No. of series: 6
- No. of episodes: 55

Production
- Production location: BBC Television Centre
- Running time: 50 minutes (Series 1); 55 minutes (Series 2–6)

Original release
- Network: BBC One
- Release: 6 November 1999 – 20 September 2003

Friends Like These is a British game show that was broadcast on BBC One first as a pilot on 6 November 1999 and then as a full series from 12 February 2000 until 20 September 2003. It was presented by Ant & Dec for the first two series and later by Ian Wright until the show ended in 2003.

== Format ==
Two five-member teams, one composed of males and the other of females, competed on each episode. They played five head-to-head challenges, with both teams nominating a different member for each of the first four based on clues given by Ant & Dec. The winner of each challenge scored one point for their team. The last remaining member of each team played the fifth challenge, "The Decider", in which each team could score up to five points.

The higher-scoring team at the end of the decider advanced to the question round, in which each member could win a holiday. All five sat in a row, with their chairs initially lit up white. One member at a time chose a teammate, who randomly drew one of 10 questions that the member had answered on a questionnaire before the show. The teammate then tried to guess the answer given by the member. If they were correct, the member's chair remained white; if not, it turned red.

After all five members had a chance to play, the ones in the white chairs were offered a choice. They could end the game immediately, each winning the holiday while the others won nothing, or gamble their prize in the hope of winning it for everyone. If they chose to gamble, the members in the red chairs chose one "white" and drew a question to answer about them; from the second series this changed to being one combined question about all five members. A correct response awarded the holiday to all five team members, while a miss sent them all home empty-handed. (If all five members of the team were still sitting in white chairs, they automatically won the holiday.)

== Transmissions ==
Series	Episodes	Originally released	
Series	Episodes	First released	Last released
Pilot		6 November 1999	
1	8	12 February 2000	1 April 2000
2	10	28 October 2000	6 January 2001
3	8	9 June 2001	4 August 2001
4	11	27 October 2001	18 January 2002
5	8	27 April 2002	29 June 2002
Special		21 December 2002	
6	8	11 January 2003	20 September 2003
