= TV Quick =

British television listings magazine (1991–2010)

- Categories: TV magazines
- Frequency: Weekly
- Publisher: Bauer Media Group
- Total circulation: 113,936 (ABC Jan – Jun 2010)
- Founded: 30 March 1991
- Final issue: 12 May 2010
- Country: United Kingdom
- Language: English

TV Quick was a British weekly television listing magazine published by H Bauer Publishing, the UK subsidiary of the family-run German company Bauer Media Group. It featured weekly television listings running from Saturday to Friday, and began publication on 30 March 1991 following deregulation of the UK listing magazine market.

The magazine had its own annual awards ceremony, the TV Quick Awards, awarded on the basis of a public vote by readers of TV Quick and its sister publication TV Choice. The awards were renamed the TV Choice Awards following the title's closure.

The title's demise followed a 27% year-on-year fall in circulation between 2008 and 2009 according to the Audit Bureau of Circulations. On 12 May 2010, Bauer announced that it had commenced a 30-day consultation period with its staff about the magazine's future, and the magazine ceased publication shortly after. It was suggested that the fall in sales was due to the magazine being caught in a no-man's-land between premium titles such as Radio Times and TV Times and budget titles like TV Choice and What's on TV.

== Awards ==
The first TV Quick awards took place in 1997 with eighteen categories voted for.

=== 2000s ===
==== 2001 ====
Award	Winner
Best Soap	EastEnders
Best Soap Actor	Martin Kemp
Best Soap Storyline	EastEnders
Best Actor	David Jason
Best Entertainment Show	So Graham Norton

==== 2000 ====
Award	Winner
Best Soap	Coronation Street
Best Soap Actress	Samantha Giles
Best Soap Actor	Martin Kemp
Best Soap Newcomer	Tina O'Brien
Best Soap Storyline	Coronation Street
TV Personality	Ali G
Best Actress	Sarah Lancashire
Best Actor	David Jason
Best TV Cook	Jamie Oliver
Best Comedy Show	The Royle Family
Best Entertainment Show	Who Wants to Be a Millionaire?
Best Lifestyle Show	Ground Force
Best Factual Show	Walking with Dinosaurs
Best Children's Show	SMTV Live
Best Imported TV Show	Friends
Best New Drama	At Home with the Braithwaites
Best Loved Drama	Bad Girls

=== 1990s ===
==== 1999 ====
Award	Winner
Best Soap	EastEnders
Best Soap Actress	Julie Hesmondhalgh
Best Soap Actor	Joe Absolom
Best Soap Newcomer	Jack Ryder
Best Actress	Amanda Burton
Best Actor	John Thaw
Best Comedy Show	Birds of a Feather
Best Lifestyle Show	Ground Force

==== 1998 ====
Award	Winner
Best Soap	EastEnders
Best Soap Actress	Martine McCutcheon
Best Soap Actor	Ross Kemp
Best Soap Newcomer	Anna Brecon
Best Soap Storyline	Coronation Street
Best Actress	Pauline Quirke
Best Actor	Robson Green
Funniest Person on TV	Lily Savage
Best Entertainment Presenter	Johnny Vaughan / Denise van Outen
Best TV Cook	Ainsley Harriott
Best Comedy Show	Friends
Best Medical Drama	Casualty
Best Drama	Where the Heart is
Best Lifestyle Show	Changing Rooms
Best Children's Show	The Simpsons
Best Game Show	Stars in Their Eyes
Best Talk Show	The Jerry Springer Show

==== 1997 ====
Award	Winner
Best Soap	EastEnders
Best Soap Actress	Martine McCutcheon
Best Soap Actor	Ross Kemp
Best Actress	Amanda Burton
Best Actor	Robson Green
Funniest Person on TV	Harry Enfield
Best TV Cook	Ainsley Harriott
Best Comedy Show	Only Fools and Horses
Best Medical Drama	Casualty
Best Entertainment Show	They Think It's All Over
Best Children's Show	Live & Kicking
Best Game Show	Big Break
Best Imported TV Programme	The X Files

== See also ==
- Look-in
