= Nickelodeon UK Kids' Choice Awards 2008 =

British entertainment awards ceremony

2008 UK Kids Choice Awards
- Date: 20 September 2008
- Presented by: Dannii Minogue
- Website: https://kca.nick.co.uk

Television/radio coverage
- Network: Nickelodeon UK

The Nickelodeon UK Kids' Choice Awards 2008 aired on 20 September 2008 on Nickelodeon. It was the UK's second Kids' Choice Awards. The ceremony was presented by Australian singer and X Factor judge Dannii Minogue.

The Nickelodeon Kids' Choice Awards for the UK is very similar to the Australian and American versions. Children who voted on the website had chances to get tickets to see the live ceremony in London.

== Guests ==
- Ant & Dec
- Ross Lee
- Miranda Cosgrove
- Josh Peck
- John Cena
- Dakota Blue Richards
- William Moseley
- Anna Popplewell
- Georgie Henley
- Same Difference
- David Mayer
- Alesha Dixon
- Suzanne Shaw
- McFly
- George Sampson
- The Saturdays
- Katie Sheridan
- Vicky Longley

== Nominee winners ==
=== Favourite ===
- Drake & Josh – Kids' TV show
- SpongeBob SquarePants – Kids' cartoon
- Britain's Got Talent – Family TV show
- Josh Peck – Male TV star
- Miley Cyrus – Female TV Star
- Wall-E – Animated film
- William Moseley – Male film star The Chronicles of Narnia: Prince Caspian
- Georgie Henley – Female film star The Chronicles of Narnia: Prince Caspian
- Simon Cowell – TV baddie
- George Sampson – Winner
- Hadouken! – "Declaration of War" – MTV Hits Song
- Ant & Dec – Funny person(s), TV presenter(s)
- David Beckham – Sports Person
- Indiana Jones and the Kingdom of the Crystal Skull – Film
- Chris Brown – Singer

=== Other ===
- Sir David Attenborough – The Hero Award
- David Mayer – The Greenie Award
