= Ant & Dec =

English television presenting duo

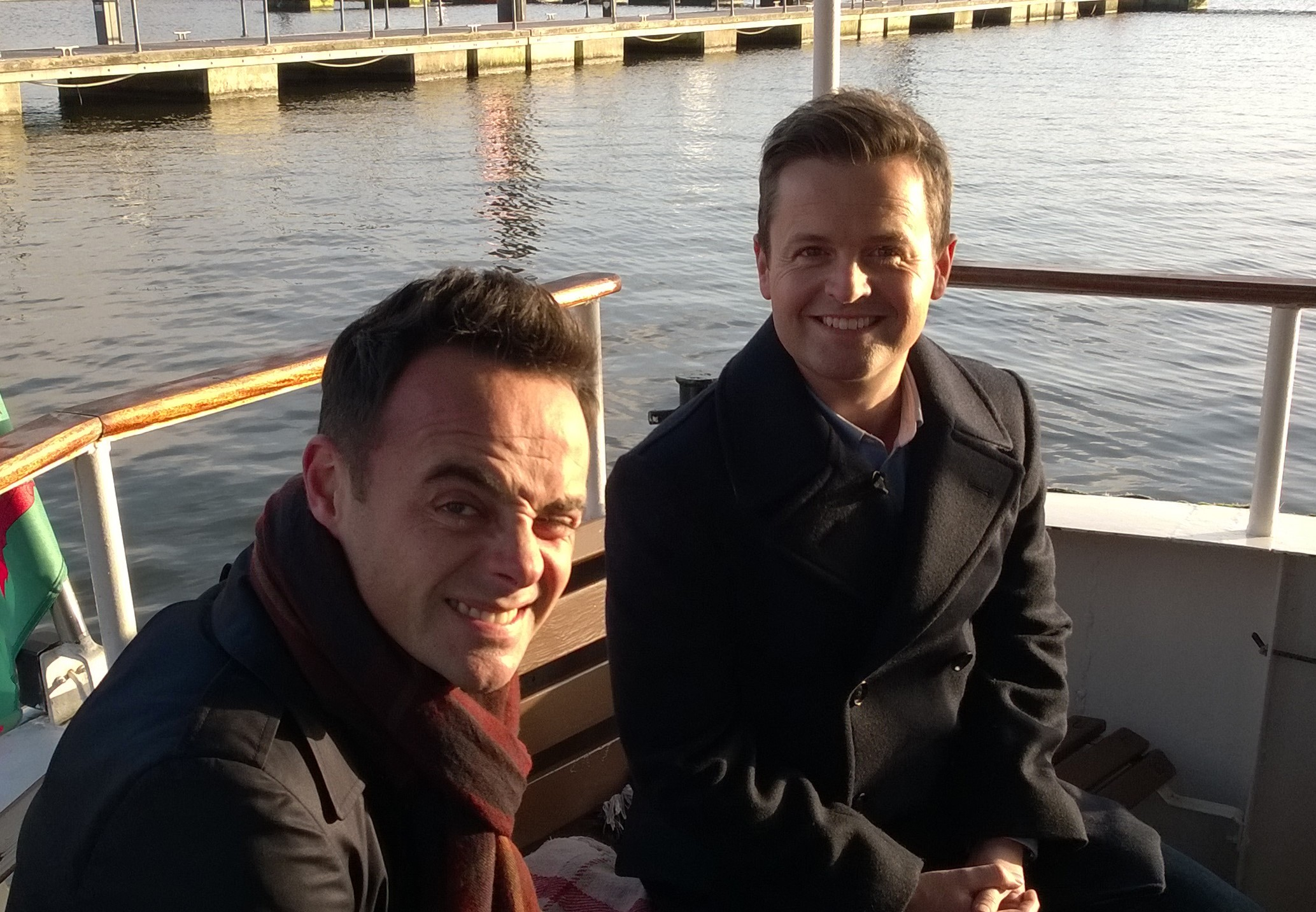
- Anthony "Ant" McPartlin and Declan "Dec" Donnelly in 2014
- Born: Anthony "Ant" McPartlin; 18 November 1975 (age 50); Declan "Dec" Donnelly; 25 September 1975 (age 51)
- Occupations: Television presenters; actors; comedians; television producers; television content creators; singers
- Notable work: I'm a Celebrity...; Saturday Night Takeaway; Britain's Got Talent; Byker Grove; Red or Black?; SMTV Live; CD:UK; Pop Idol; Wanna Bet?; Alien Autopsy

Comedy career
- Years active: 1988–present
- Medium: Film; television; music; radio
- Genres: Clean comedy; observational comedy; musical comedy; surreal humour; slapstick
- Members: Anthony McPartlin; Declan Donnelly
- Musical career
- Genre: Pop
- Years active: 1993–2026
- Website: antanddec.com

Ant & Dec are an English television presenting duo consisting of Anthony McPartlin and Declan Donnelly from Newcastle upon Tyne. After meeting as child actors on CBBC's drama Byker Grove, they performed together as pop musicians PJ & Duncan, the names of their characters from the series. Their enduring popularity and continuous presence on prime-time television have made them a staple of British entertainment.

The duo have since pursued careers as television presenters, and currently host I'm a Celebrity...Get Me Out of Here!, Britain's Got Talent, and Limitless Win. Previous hosting credits include SMTV Live, CD:UK, Friends Like These, Pop Idol, Ant & Dec's Saturday Night Takeaway, PokerFace, Wanna Bet?, Push the Button, Red or Black?, and Text Santa. They presented the annual Brit Awards in 2001, 2015 and 2016.

In addition to presenting, the pair are actors and both had leading roles in the 2006 film Alien Autopsy. They also have their own production company, Mitre Television. In a 2004 poll for the BBC, Ant & Dec were named the eighteenth most influential people in British culture.

== Background ==
McPartlin and Donnelly met while working on the second series of children's drama Byker Grove for the BBC in 1990. After a shaky start, they soon became best friends. They have achieved such popularity as a duo that they are hardly seen apart on screen. It is reported that they are each insured against the other's death, with the amount reportedly being a six-figure sum.

They are both avid supporters of their local football club, Newcastle United. The pair were in attendance at Wembley Stadium to watch Newcastle win the 2025 EFL Cup, the club's first major trophy in 56 years and their first domestic trophy in 70 years. The pair joined the team on the double decker bus for their victory parade in Newcastle 2 weeks after the cup win.

== Career ==
=== Acting ===
Although McPartlin had gained some television experience with a brief stint on the children's television series Why Don't You?, which was broadcast on the BBC, Donnelly was the first of the two to acquire his place on the BBC children's drama Byker Grove. He joined in 1989, playing Duncan. A year later, McPartlin joined the cast to play PJ (series 2, episode 5). Their friendship began when their storylines collided, creating a friendship both on and off-screen. Byker Grove producer Matthew Robinson told them to "Stay together through any row you have, whatever it is, be together and you could be the future Morecambe and Wise. I think they have proved that in many ways."

Donnelly also played a stable boy in the film adaptation of the novel The Cinder Path in his teenage years.

Since becoming television presenters, the pair have, albeit infrequently, returned to acting, both on stage and screen. They played themselves in the film Love Actually (in which Bill Nighy's character addressed Dec as "Ant or Dec"). They have returned to their Geordie roots in a one-off tribute to The Likely Lads and also by returning to Byker Grove for Geoff's funeral. In July 2023, it was announced that the pair would produce a reboot of Byker Grove, to simply be called Byker.

In 1998, the pair starred in the pantomime Snow White and the Seven Dwarfs at Sunderland's Empire Theatre alongside Donnelly's partner at the time Clare Buckfield. The show was financially unsuccessful, making £20,000 less than it cost to stage, with the duo footing a large share of the shortfall.

Ant & Dec's most recent acting appearance was in the film Alien Autopsy released in April 2006. The film gained positive reviews with critics praising the pair's acting performance but lost more than half of its budget at the box office. In 2013, they reprised their roles as P.J. and Duncan on Ant & Dec's Saturday Night Takeaway.

=== Music ===
After leaving television, the duo turned their hand to pop music. Their first single was a song they performed as part of the group Grove Matrix, performed as part of the storyline in TV show Byker Grove, titled "Tonight I'm Free". The single had some success, and the duo recorded two albums under their character names of PJ & Duncan. Their most famous hit during this period was the BRIT Award nominated "Let's Get Ready To Rhumble", for which the video and moves were choreographed by Mark Short, who had previously worked with Tina Turner and Peter Andre. For their third album, the duo reinvented themselves under their real names of Ant & Dec. The album featured their signature single, "Shout".

During their time as primarily music artists, the pair released sixteen singles and three studio albums, with their highest UK chart position being number three. Success also struck in other European countries. The duo had a short-lived revival in the music industry, releasing a song for the 2002 FIFA World Cup, titled "We're on the Ball". The track peaked at No. 3, being beaten by Will Young and Gareth Gates. On 23 March 2013, Ant and Dec performed "Let's Get Ready To Rhumble" as part of their show Ant and Dec's Saturday Night Takeaway, which powered the song to number one in the UK iTunes chart and on Sunday 31 March 2013 the track was revealed as the Official UK Number 1 single on The Official Chart on BBC Radio 1. The two donated all money made from the re-release to charity.

In February 2022 the pair released the charity single "We Werk Together", written by Ian Masterson, with RuPaul's Drag Race UK winners The Vivienne, Lawrence Chaney and Krystal Versace with the proceeds from the single going to the Trussell Trust. The song was performed on the first episode of the eighteenth series of Ant & Dec's Saturday Night Takeaway as the "End of the Show" Show, introduced by RuPaul.

=== Presenting ===
==== Children's television ====
Ant & Dec got their first presenting job in 1994 using a shortened versions of their real names, Tony & Lan, while still releasing music under the alias of PJ & Duncan. They co-presented a Saturday-morning children's show entitled Gimme 5, which was broadcast on CITV. In 1995, the duo were once again offered a job on CBBC, this time presenting their own series, entitled The Ant & Dec Show. The series was broadcast from 1995 to 1996, and in 1996, Ant & Dec won two BAFTA Awards, one for 'Best Children's Show' and one for 'Best Sketch Comedy Show'. In 1996, a VHS release, entitled The Ant & Dec Show – Confidential, was made available in shops, and featured an hour of the best bits from two years of the programme, as well as specially recorded sketches and music videos.

In 1997, the duo switched to Channel 4, presenting an early-evening children's show entitled Ant & Dec Unzipped. This show also won a BAFTA but was dropped after just one series. ITV signed the duo in August 1998, and within weeks they were assigned to present ITV1's Saturday morning programmes SMTV Live and CD:UK, alongside Cat Deeley. The duo presented the shows with Deeley for three years, becoming the most popular ITV Saturday morning show. The programme's success was the mix of games such as Eat My Goal, Wonkey Donkey and Challenge Ant, sketches such as "Dec Says" and the "Secret of My Success", and the chemistry between Ant, Dec, and Deeley. Two SMTV VHS cassettes, compiling highlights from both shows, were released in 2000 and 2001. Ant & Dec also starred in the children's TV series Engie Benjy during their time on SMTV.

Ant & Dec left children's television in 2001 after trying out formats like Friends Like These for BBC One in 2000 and Slap Bang with Ant & Dec for ITV in 2001.

==== Primetime ====
Ant & Dec's first primetime presenting job came in the form of BBC Saturday-night game show Friends Like These, which was first broadcast in 1999. The duo presented two series of the programme between 1999 and 2001. In 2001, the duo's contract with ITV was renewed for a further three years, following their appearances on SMTV Live and CD:UK, and they received their first primetime presenting job on the station, presenting new Saturday night reality series Pop Idol. Pop Idol was broadcast for only two series before being replaced in 2004 by The X Factor, to which former Smash Hits editor Kate Thornton was assigned presenting duties.

In 2002, Ant & Dec created and presented Ant & Dec's Saturday Night Takeaway. The first series was not an overall success, but with the introduction of "Ant & Dec Undercover", "What's Next?", "Ant v Dec" and "Little Ant and Dec", the show became a hit. During the fifth series, Dec broke his arm, thumb and suffered a concussion whilst completing a challenge for the 'Ant vs. Dec' segment of the show. The incident involved learning how to ride a motorbike and jump through a fire ring. Dec failed to pull hard enough on the bike's throttle during the challenge, causing it to topple over and sending him flying through the air. In 2006, the first episode of series six saw the duo abseil down the side of the 22-story high London Studios, where the show was filmed. Two DVDs, a best-bits book, and a board game of the series were released during 2004.

The show was rested after 2009 as Ant & Dec said they were running out of ideas, and it became stale, as many of the popular features such as "Little Ant & Dec" and "Undercover" were dropped. Saturday Night Takeaway returned in 2013 and was a massive success; Ant & Dec resurrected previous hit features such as "Undercover", "Little Ant and Dec" (albeit with a new Little Ant and Dec) Win the Ads, and Ant v Dec, with new host Ashley Roberts. They also brought in new features such as the Supercomputer, Vegas or Bust, the End of the show 'show' where Ant and Dec perform with an act such as Riverdance or an Orchestra, and "I'm a Celebrity, get out of my ear!" where they have an earpiece in a celebs ear, and they tell them what to do while being filmed by secret cameras. The series was such a success that ITV recommissioned it for 2014 even before the 2013 series ended. A board game of the format was released. The final episodes of the 2020 series were filmed at home due to the COVID-19 pandemic, and the 2021 series was filmed with a virtual audience and precautions.

In August 2002, Ant & Dec fronted I'm a Celebrity...Get Me Out of Here!. They drew their highest viewing figures to date in February 2004: nearly 15 million tuned in to watch the third series. In May 2006, they were assigned to present coverage of the charity football match Soccer Aid. They were then invited back to present coverage of the second match in September 2008 but have been replaced by Dermot O'Leary from 2010 as the match clashed with Britain's Got Talent. In June 2006, they announced they had created a new game-show format for ITV, entitled PokerFace. The show featured members of the public gambling high stakes of money to win the ultimate prize. The first series began airing on 10 July 2006 and was aired for seven consecutive nights. The second series was broadcast in early 2007 and saw a move to a prime-time Saturday slot. Ratings for the series fell to below 3.5 million, and the series was subsequently axed in March 2007.

In 2005, as part of the ITV's 50th birthday celebrations, they were back on television fronting Ant & Dec's Gameshow Marathon, a celebration of some of ITV's most enduring gameshows from the past 50 years. They hosted The Price Is Right, Family Fortunes, Play Your Cards Right, Bullseye, Take Your Pick!, The Golden Shot and Sale of the Century.

In June 2007, they were offered the job of presenters on new ITV reality platform Britain's Got Talent by Simon Cowell. The series features contestants aiming to win £100,000 and spot on the bill at the Royal Variety Performance while performing and being judged by Cowell, actress Amanda Holden and former Daily Mirror editor Piers Morgan. The series was highly successful, drawing in nearly 12 million viewers, and led to the pair continuing to operate as hosts for future series, along with continual appearances in a regular feature on the ITV2 spin-off show Britain's Got More Talent. But, similarly to Saturday Night Takeaway, the twelfth series saw Dec present the live shows on his own (despite them both presenting the auditions shows).

The pair filmed six episodes for a new American game show, Wanna Bet?, in November 2007. The episodes were broadcast in 2008 but failed to attract enough interest for a second series to be commissioned. What You Wrote, another format created by the duo, was due to air in Autumn 2008 but was reportedly axed by ITV. In 2010, the duo debuted a replacement for Ant & Dec's Saturday Night Takeaway, entitled Ant & Dec's Push the Button. The series was a success, albeit not in the same way as Saturday Night Takeaway, and a second run of the programme was broadcast in 2011, but Ant and Dec later dropped the show in favour of reviving Saturday Night Takeaway.

Ant & Dec have also presented the game show Red or Black?, a creation of Cowell's, airing live on ITV in 2011 with a second series in 2012, but this was not a ratings success and was cancelled after the second series. On 24 December 2011, they presented ITV's charity initiative Text Santa with Holly Willoughby. Text Santa returned in 2012, 2013 and 2014 with Ant & Dec co-hosting alongside Christine Bleakley, Phillip Schofield, Holly Willoughby, Alesha Dixon and Paddy McGuinness.

In January 2016, Ant and Dec presented When Ant and Dec Met The Prince: 40 Years of The Prince's Trust, a one-off documentary for ITV. In 2016, they also presented The Queen's 90th Birthday Celebration, broadcast live on ITV.

In November 2019, Ant and Dec's DNA Journey aired, which followed the pair as they retraced their family roots through DNA samples. In the show, they both found out that they have the same DNA marker, which means Ant and Dec are related as distant cousins. The DNA Journey format has since been done with other celebrities.

Starting from 2022, ITV aired Limitless Win, a game show with an endless jackpot. The show got renewed for a second series that started in January 2023 and was renewed for a third series later that year.

=== Earnings ===
In 2002, Ant & Dec signed a two-year golden handcuffs deal with ITV, worth £2m.

In 2004, they signed their third golden handcuffs deal with ITV, running until the end of 2007.

In April 2007, the duo signed a two-year golden handcuffs deal with ITV, reportedly worth £30–40 million, securing their career at the station until the end of 2009.

In 2009 they extended their golden handcuffs deal for two years. In 2011, they extended their golden handcuffs deal for two years.

In November 2016, the pair signed a new three-year deal with ITV, estimated to be worth £30 million over 3 years.

=== Other activities ===
In 2006, a celebration of the show Spitting Image saw Ant and Dec having their own puppets made. They have also been made into cartoon characters on the comedy show 2DTV, different puppets in Newzoids and Spitting Image Presents: The Rest is Bulls*!t, and face masks in Bo' Selecta!.

On 28 September 2008, news outlets reported that the pair were attacked by the Taliban whilst in Afghanistan to present a Pride of Britain Award.

In December 2008, the duo starred in their first seasonal advert in seven years, for the supermarket chain Sainsbury's. The duo appeared alongside chef Jamie Oliver. In March 2009, the duo filmed a short film for inclusion on Comic Relief, which documents a visit to a community centre for young carers in the North East. In September 2009, the duo released their official autobiography, entitled Ooh! What a Lovely Pair. Our Story. In October 2010, the duo appeared in several Nintendo adverts playing both the Wii and Nintendo DS.

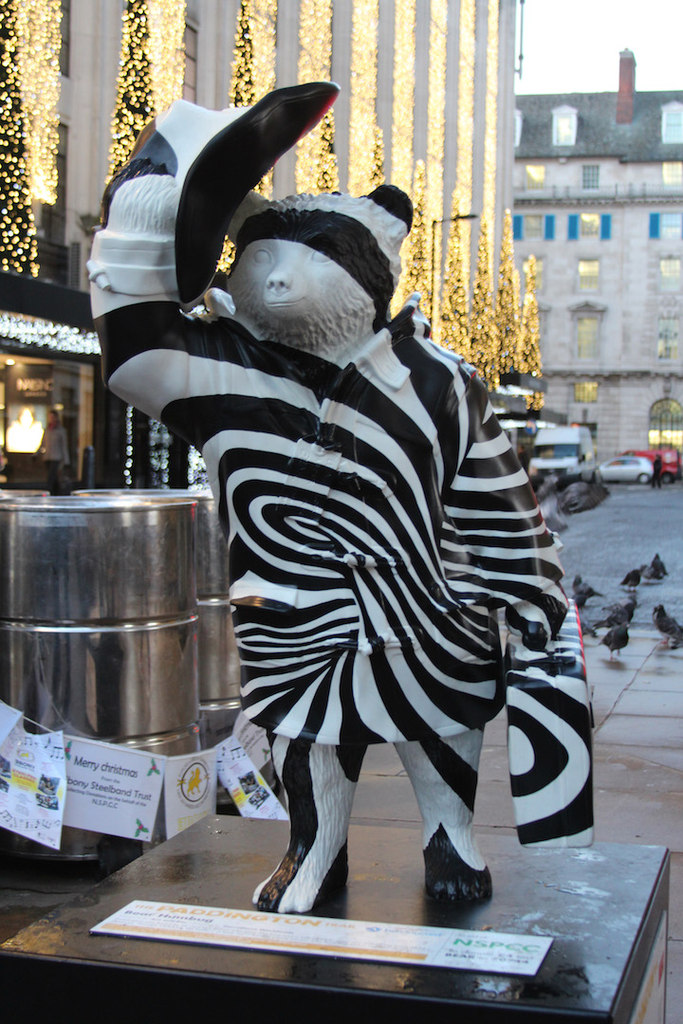
Ant & Dec's black and white Paddington Bear statue in London, auctioned to raise funds for the NSPCC

In 2011 and 2014, they both appeared on the ITV2 comedy panel show Celebrity Juice. From February 2013 to March 2015 they appeared in adverts for supermarket Morrisons. Between February 2016 and March 2018, they had appeared in adverts for car company Suzuki.

In 2014, Ant & Dec designed a black and white striped Paddington Bear statue, one of fifty statues of the bear located around London prior to the release of the film Paddington, which was auctioned to raise funds for the National Society for the Prevention of Cruelty to Children (NSPCC).

In 2015, the pair made a cameo appearance on the American adaptation of Saturday Night Takeaway, NBC's Best Time Ever with Neil Patrick Harris. They are also executive producers on the show.

In 2020, they celebrated 30 years of working together, releasing a book titled Once Upon a Tyne. It featured stories from their time as a duo and from behind the scenes of their shows.

In 2026, they launched their own podcast, entitled Hanging Out with Ant and Dec where they catch up about their lives and take questions and comments from listeners.

=== OBEs ===
On 10 June 2016, it was announced that the duo would be awarded OBE status by Queen Elizabeth II at an investiture later that year. The pair said they were both "shocked, but incredibly honoured". McPartlin and Donnelly collected their awards for services to broadcasting and entertainment at Buckingham Palace from Prince Charles (now King Charles III) on 27 January 2017.

=== Guinness World Record ===
On 28 January 2020, the duo were awarded the Guinness World Record for "the most National Television Awards won consecutively for Best Presenter" which was at 18 as of 22 January 2019. The record was broken a further 5 times by Ant and Dec themselves after they won the same award 5 years consecutively bringing the new record to 23. The run ended in 2025 when Gary Lineker won the award.

== Controversies ==
Law firm Olswang was commissioned to investigate the 2005 British Comedy Awards when the producers overturned the voting public's first choice, The Catherine Tate Show in favour of Ant and Dec's Saturday Night Takeaway for the People's Choice Award. The incident was also the subject of an investigation by media regulator Ofcom.

Following allegations of fraud in 2007, an investigation by auditors Deloitte Touche Tohmatsu discovered that two shows, Ant & Dec's Gameshow Marathon and Ant & Dec's Saturday Night Takeaway, had defrauded viewers participating in phone-ins. The programmes were subject to a further investigation by Ofcom which found that between January 2003 and October 2006 Ant & Dec's Saturday Night Takeaway had:

- selected competition finalists before the telephone lines were announced as closed
- staggered the selection of competition finalists, which meant that viewers entering the competition did not have a fair and equal chance of winning
- selected finalists based on their suitability to be on television and where they lived
- selected an individual already known to the production team to be placed on the shortlist of potential winners and who went on to win the competition.

Between September and October 2005, Ant & Dec's Gameshow Marathon had:

- on six occasions in the Prize Mountain competition, selected winners based on their suitability to be on screen
- failed to account for almost half of the competition entries

The pair were ridiculed for their alleged participation in the fraud on the front cover of the satirical magazine Private Eye.

On 30 September 2008, Ant & Dec were sued for US$30 million by Greek American stand-up comedian and actor Ant for using the name 'Ant' in the United States. The lawsuit, among other things, alleged trademark infringement and fraud. The suit was dismissed in May 2010. The pair have had the UK registered trademark for 'Ant & Dec' in the category of 'Entertainment services' since 2003.

On 16 January 2026, Ant & Dec posted a promo for their new podcast on the social media platform X, which immediately received backlash for appearing to allude to suicide. The post was quickly taken down, and the pair apologised.

== Filmography ==
=== Television ===
Year	Title	Role
1989–1993, 2000	Byker Grove	PJ, Duncan/Actors
1994	Gimme 5	Guest Presenters
1995–1996	The Ant & Dec Show	Presenters
1997	Ant & Dec Unzipped	Presenters
1997	Ant and Dec's Geordie Christmas	Presenters
1998–2001, 2003	SMTV Live	Presenters
1998–2001	CD:UK	Presenters
1999–2001	Friends Like These	Presenters
2001, 2015–2016	BRIT Awards	Presenters
2001	Slap Bang with Ant & Dec	Presenters
2001–2003	Pop Idol	Presenters
2001–2002	The Record of the Year	Presenters
2002–2004	Engie Benjy	Engie Benjy, Jollop the Dog and Trucker Troy (voices)
2002	A Tribute to the Likely Lads	Themselves
2002–2009, 2013–2018, 2020–2024	Ant & Dec's Saturday Night Takeaway	Presenters
2002–2017, 2019–present (Ant); 2002–present (Dec)	I'm a Celebrity...Get Me Out of Here!	Presenters
2003–2004	World Idol	Presenters
2005	Ant & Dec's Gameshow Marathon	Presenters
2006–2008	Soccer Aid	Presenters
2006–2007	PokerFace	Presenters
2007–2020, 2022–present	Britain's Got Talent	Presenters
2008	Wanna Bet?	Presenters
2009	Ant & Dec's Christmas Show	Presenters
2010–2011	Ant & Dec's Push the Button	Presenters
2011–2012	Red or Black?	Presenters
2011–2014	Text Santa	Presenters
2015	Best Time Ever with Neil Patrick Harris	Themselves (Cameo)
2016	When Ant and Dec Met The Prince: 40 Years of The Prince's Trust	Presenters
2016	The Queen's 90th Birthday Celebration	Presenters
2019	Ant & Dec's DNA Journey	Presenters
2019	Britain's Got Talent: The Champions	Presenters
2022–present	Limitless Win	Presenters
2022–present	The Prince's Trust Awards	Presenters
2023–present	I'm a Celebrity... South Africa	Presenters
2025	Newcastle United EFL Cup Winners Parade	Presenters
2025	The Accidental Tourist	Presenters
2027	I'm a Celebrity: The Wild Frontier	Presenters

=== Films ===
Year	Title	Role
2003	Love Actually	Themselves
2006	Alien Autopsy	Gary Shoefield and Ray Santilli

=== Television advertisements ===
Year	Title	Role
2000	Wispa Bite	Themselves
2001	Ambrosia Splat	Themselves; Voiceover
2001	Woolworths	Themselves
2002	McDonald's	Themselves; Voiceover
2008, 2017	Sainsbury's	Themselves
2009–2011	Wii & Nintendo DS	Themselves
2013–2015	Morrisons	Themselves
2016–2018	Suzuki	Themselves
2019–2020	Marks & Spencer	Themselves
2019–2025	Santander Bank	Themselves
2021	TikTok	Themselves

=== Executive producer(s) ===
Year	Title	Role
1998–2001	Friends Like These	Themselves; Executive Producers
2003–2024	Saturday Night Takeaway	Themselves; Executive Producers
2019–2024	In for a Penny	Creators; Producers
2021–present	Limitless Win	Themselves; Executive Producers
TBA	Byker	Executive Producers; Writers

=== Television idents ===
- ITV "Celebrities" idents (3 idents, 2002)
- ITV "Abstract celebrities" idents (20 idents, 2003)
- ITV "Animated celebrities" idents (1 ident, 2004)

=== Apps ===
- An official Saturday Night Takeaway app known as Studio Rush launched on 30 January 2013.

== Awards ==
Year	Ceremony	Award	Recipient	Result	References
1994	14th Brit Awards	Best Song	"Let's Get Ready to Rhumble"	Nominated	
1995	15th Brit Awards	British Breakthrough	PJ & Duncan	Nominated	
1995	Royal Television Society Awards		The Ant and Dec Show	Won	
1996	British Academy Children's Awards	Children's Entertainment Show	The Ant and Dec Show	Won	
1997	British Academy Children's Awards	Children's Entertainment Show	The Ant and Dec Show	Nominated	
1998	British Academy Children's Awards	Children's Entertainment Show	Ant and Dec Unzipped	Won	
2000	British Academy Children's Awards	Children's Entertainment Show	SMTV Live	Won	
2000	TV Choice Awards	Best Children's Show	SMTV Live	Won	
2000	Royal Television Society Awards	Best Children's Entertainment Programme	SMTV Live	Won	
2000	TV Hits Awards	Best Teen Show	CD:UK	Won	
2000	Loaded Carling Good Work Fellas Awards	Best Double Act		Won	
2000	British Comedy Awards	The People's Choice		Won	
2001	TV Choice Awards	Best Children's Show	SMTV Live	Won	
2001	Broadcast Awards	Best Children's Programme	SMTV Live	Won	
2001	Royal Television Society Awards	Best Television Presenters		Won	
2001	Disney Channel Awards	Kids Award	The Ant and Dec Show	Won	
2001	British Academy Children's Awards	Best Children's Entertainment Show	SMTV Live	Nominated	
2002	British Academy Television Awards	Entertainment Performance	Pop Idol	Nominated	
2002	British Academy Children's Awards	Children's Entertainment Show	SMTV Live	Won	
2003	British Academy Television Awards	Entertainment Programme or Series	I'm a Celebrity...Get Me Out of Here!	Won	
2003	British Comedy Awards	Best Comedy Entertainment Personality		Won	
2004	TRIC Awards	Best TV Personality		Won	
2004	British Comedy Awards	Best Comedy Entertainment Programme	Ant & Dec's Saturday Night Takeaway	Won	
2004	British Comedy Awards	Best Comedy Entertainment Personality		Won	
2005	British Academy Television Awards	Entertainment Performance	I'm a Celebrity...Get Me Out of Here!	Nominated	
2005	TRIC Awards	Best TV Personality		Won	
2006	British Comedy Awards	Best Comedy Entertainment Programme	Ant & Dec's Saturday Night Takeaway	Nominated	
2006	British Comedy Awards	Best Comedy Entertainment Personality		Nominated	
2006	TRIC Awards	Best TV Personality		Nominated	
2006	TRIC Awards	Best Entertainment Programme	I'm a Celebrity...Get Me Out of Here!	Nominated	
2007	British Academy Television Awards	Entertainment Performance	Ant & Dec's Saturday Night Takeaway	Nominated	
2007	TRIC Awards	Best TV Personality		Won	
2008	TV Quick & TV Choice Awards	Best Entertainment Show	Ant & Dec's Saturday Night Takeaway	Won	
2008	Nickelodeon UK Kids Choice Awards	Favourite Funny Person		Won	
2008	Nickelodeon UK Kids Choice Awards	Best TV Presenters		Won	
2008	Nickelodeon UK Kids Choice Awards	Best Family TV Show	Britain's Got Talent	Won	
2009	TV Quick & TV Choice Awards	Best Entertainment Show	Ant & Dec's Saturday Night Takeaway	Won	
2009	TV Quick & TV Choice Awards	Best Talent Show	Britain's Got Talent	Won	
2009	TV Quick & TV Choice Awards	Outstanding Contribution Award		Won	
2009	British Academy Television Awards	Entertainment Performance	I'm a Celebrity...Get Me Out of Here!	Nominated	
2010	British Academy Television Awards	Entertainment Performance	I'm a Celebrity...Get Me Out of Here!	Won	
2010	British Academy Television Awards	Entertainment Programme	Britain's Got Talent	Won	
2012	Freesat Free TV Awards	Best TV Presenter(s)		Won	
2012	TRIC Awards	Best TV Personality		Nominated	
2012	TRIC Awards	Best Reality Programme	I'm a Celebrity... Get Me Out of Here!	Nominated	
2013	TRIC Awards	TV Personality of the Year		Won	
2013	TRIC Awards	TRIC Special Award	I'm a Celebrity...Get Me Out of Here!	Won	
2013	RTS Awards	Entertainment Performance	I'm a Celebrity...Get Me Out of Here!	Won	
2013	British Academy Television Awards	Entertainment Performance	I'm a Celebrity...Get Me Out of Here!	Nominated	
2014	TRIC Awards	Best TV Personality		Won	
2014	TRIC Awards	Best Reality Programme	I'm a Celebrity...Get Me Out of Here!	Nominated	
2014	British Academy Television Awards	Entertainment Performance	Ant & Dec's Saturday Night Takeaway	Won	
2014	British Academy Television Awards	Entertainment Programme	Ant & Dec's Saturday Night Takeaway	Won	
2015	TRIC Awards	Best TV Personality		Won	
2015	TRIC Awards	Best Entertainment Programme	Ant & Dec's Saturday Night Takeaway	Nominated	
2015	British Academy Television Awards	Entertainment Performance	Ant & Dec's Saturday Night Takeaway	Won	
2015	British Academy Television Awards	Entertainment Programme	Ant & Dec's Saturday Night Takeaway	Won	
2015	I Talk Telly Awards	Best Reality TV Show	I'm a Celebrity...Get Me Out of Here!	Won	
2015	I Talk Telly Awards	Best TV Presenter		Won	
2016	TRIC Awards	Best TV Personality		Won	
2016	TRIC Awards	Best Reality Programme	I'm a Celebrity...Get Me Out of Here!	Nominated	
2016	British Academy Television Awards	Entertainment Performance	Britain's Got Talent	Nominated	
2016	British Academy Television Awards	Reality and Constructed Factual	I'm a Celebrity...Get Me Out of Here!	Nominated	
2016	I Talk Telly Awards	Best Reality TV Show	I'm a Celebrity...Get Me Out of Here!	Won	
2016	I Talk Telly Awards	Best TV Presenter		Won	
2017	TRIC Awards	Best Entertainment Programme	Ant & Dec's Saturday Night Takeaway	Won	
2017	British Academy Television Awards	Entertainment Programme	Ant & Dec's Saturday Night Takeaway	Won	
2017	British Academy Television Awards	Entertainment Programme	Britain's Got Talent	Nominated	
2017	British Academy Television Awards	Live Event	The Queen's 90th Birthday Celebration	Won	
2017	I Talk Telly Awards	Best Reality TV Show	I'm a Celebrity...Get Me Out of Here!	Won	
2017	I Talk Telly Awards	Best TV Presenting Partnership		Won	
2018	TRIC Awards	Best TV Personality		Won	
2018	TRIC Awards	Best Entertainment Programme	I'm a Celebrity...Get Me Out of Here!	Won	
2018	British Academy Television Awards	Entertainment Programme	Britain's Got Talent	Won	
2018	I Talk Telly Awards	Best Reality TV Show	I'm a Celebrity...Get Me Out of Here!	Won	
2018	I Talk Telly Awards	Best TV Presenter	Declan Donnelly	Won	
2019	TRIC Awards	Best TV Personality		Nominated	
2019	TRIC Awards	Best Reality Programme	I'm a Celebrity...Get Me Out of Here!	Nominated	
2019	British Academy Television Awards	Entertainment Programme	Britain's Got Talent	Won	
2019	British Academy Television Awards	Reality and Constructed Factual	I'm a Celebrity...Get Me Out of Here!	Won	
2019	British Academy Television Awards	Entertainment Performance	Ant & Dec's Saturday Night Takeaway	Nominated	
2019	British Academy Television Awards	Entertainment Programme	Ant & Dec's Saturday Night Takeaway	Nominated	
2019	TV Choice Awards	Reality Show	I'm a Celebrity...Get Me Out of Here!	Won	
2019	I Talk Telly Awards	Best Reality TV Show	I'm a Celebrity...Get Me Out of Here!	Won	
2019	I Talk Telly Awards	Best TV Presenting Partnership		Won	
2020	TRIC Awards	Best TV Personality		Won	
2020	TRIC Awards	Best Reality Programme	I'm a Celebrity...Get Me Out of Here!	Nominated	
2020	TV Choice Awards	Entertainment Show	Ant & Dec's Saturday Night Takeaway	Won	
2020	TV Choice Awards	Reality Show	I'm a Celebrity...Get Me Out of Here!	Won	
2020	I Talk Telly Awards	Best Entertainment Show	Ant & Dec's Saturday Night Takeaway	Won	
2020	I Talk Telly Awards	Best Reality TV Show	I'm a Celebrity...Get Me Out of Here!	Won	
2020	I Talk Telly Awards	Best TV Presenting Partnership		Won	
2021	TRIC Awards	Best TV Personality		Won	
2021	TRIC Awards	Best Reality Programme	I'm a Celebrity...Get Me Out of Here!	Won	
2021	TRIC Awards	Best Entertainment Programme	Ant & Dec's Saturday Night Takeaway	Nominated	
2021	TV Choice Awards	Reality Show	I'm a Celebrity...Get Me Out of Here!	Won	
2021	I Talk Telly Awards	Best Entertainment Show	Ant & Dec's Saturday Night Takeaway	Won	
2021	I Talk Telly Awards	Best TV Presenting Partnership		Won	
2022	British Academy Television Awards	Entertainment Programme	Ant & Dec's Saturday Night Takeaway	Won	
2022	TRIC Awards	TV Personality		Won	
2022	TRIC Awards	Reality Programme	I'm a Celebrity...Get Me Out of Here!	Nominated	
2022	TRIC Awards	Entertainment	Ant & Dec's Saturday Night Takeaway	Nominated	
2022	TV Choice Awards	Best Entertainment Show	Ant & Dec's Saturday Night Takeaway	Nominated	
2022	TV Choice Awards	Best Reality Programme	I'm a Celebrity…Get Me Out of Here!	Won	
2022	TV Choice Awards	Best Talent Show	Britain's Got Talent	Nominated	
2022	I Talk Telly Awards	Best Entertainment Show	Ant & Dec's Saturday Night Takeaway	Won	
2022	I Talk Telly Awards	Best Reality TV Show	I'm a Celebrity...Get Me Out of Here!	Won	
2022	I Talk Telly Awards	Best TV Presenting Partnership		Won	
2023	British Academy Television Awards	Entertainment Programme	Ant & Dec's Saturday Night Takeaway	Nominated	
2023	TRIC Awards	TV Personality		Nominated	
2023	TRIC Awards	Entertainment	Ant & Dec's Saturday Night Takeaway	Nominated	
2023	TRIC Awards	Entertainment	Britain's Got Talent	Nominated	
2023	TRIC Awards	Entertainment	I'm a Celebrity... Get Me Out of Here!	Nominated	
2023	TRIC Awards	Game Show	Ant & Dec's Limitless Win	Nominated	
2023	I Talk Telly Awards	Best Entertainment Show	Ant & Dec's Saturday Night Takeaway	Nominated	
2023	I Talk Telly Awards	Best Reality TV Show	I'm a Celebrity...Get Me Out of Here!	Nominated	
2023	I Talk Telly Awards	Best Talent Show	Britain's Got Talent	Nominated	
2023	I Talk Telly Awards	Best TV Presenting Partnership		Won	
2024	TV Choice Awards	Best Entertainment Show	Ant & Dec's Saturday Night Takeaway	Nominated	
2024	TV Choice Awards	Best Reality Programme	I'm a Celebrity…Get Me Out of Here!	Won	
2024	TV Choice Awards	Best Talent Show	Britain's Got Talent	Nominated	
2024	British Academy Television Awards	Entertainment Performance	I'm a Celebrity... Get Me Out of Here!	Nominated	
2024	TRIC Awards	TV Personality		Nominated	
2024	TRIC Awards	Entertainment	Ant & Dec's Saturday Night Takeaway	Nominated	
2024	TRIC Awards	Entertainment	Britain's Got Talent	Nominated	
2024	TRIC Awards	Entertainment	I'm a Celebrity... Get Me Out of Here!	Nominated	
2024	TRIC Awards	Game Show	Ant & Dec's Limitless Win	Nominated	

=== National Television Awards ===
Wins

Year	Award	Show
2001	Most Popular Entertainment Presenter	
2002	Most Popular Entertainment Presenter	
2002	Most Popular Entertainment Programme	Pop Idol
2002	Special Recognition Award	
2003	Most Popular Entertainment Presenter	
2003	Most Popular Entertainment Programme	Ant & Dec's Saturday Night Takeaway
2003	Most Popular Reality Programme	I'm a Celebrity...Get Me Out of Here!
2004	Most Popular Entertainment Presenter	
2004	Most Popular Entertainment Programme	Ant & Dec's Saturday Night Takeaway
2005	Most Popular Entertainment Presenter	
2006	Most Popular Entertainment Presenter	
2006	Most Popular Quiz Programme	Ant & Dec's Gameshow Marathon
2007	Most Popular Entertainment Presenter	
2007	Most Popular Entertainment Programme	Ant & Dec's Saturday Night Takeaway
2007	Most Popular Reality Programme	I'm a Celebrity...Get Me Out of Here!
2008	Most Popular Entertainment Presenter	
2009	There were no NTAs in 2009	
2010	Most Popular Entertainment Presenter	
2010	Most Popular Entertainment Programme	Ant & Dec's Saturday Night Takeaway
2011	Most Popular Entertainment Presenter	
2011	Most Popular Entertainment Programme	I'm a Celebrity...Get Me Out of Here!
2012	Most Popular Entertainment Presenter	
2012	Most Popular Reality Programme	I'm a Celebrity...Get Me Out of Here!
2013	Most Popular Entertainment Presenter	
2013	Most Popular Entertainment Programme	I'm a Celebrity...Get Me Out of Here!
2014	Most Popular Entertainment Presenter	
2014	Most Popular Entertainment Programme	I'm a Celebrity...Get Me Out of Here!
2014	Landmark Award	
2015	Most Popular Entertainment Presenter	
2015	Most Popular Entertainment Programme	I'm a Celebrity...Get Me Out of Here!
2016	Most Popular Entertainment Programme	I'm a Celebrity...Get Me Out of Here!
2016	Most Popular TV Presenter	
2017	Most Popular Entertainment Programme	Ant & Dec's Saturday Night Takeaway
2017	Most Popular TV Presenter	
2017	Challenge Show	I'm a Celebrity...Get Me Out of Here!
2018	The Bruce Forsyth Entertainment Award	Ant & Dec's Saturday Night Takeaway
2018	Most Popular TV Presenter	
2018	Challenge Show	I'm a Celebrity...Get Me Out of Here!
2019	The Bruce Forsyth Entertainment Award	I'm a Celebrity...Get Me Out of Here!
2019	Most Popular TV Presenter	
2020	The Bruce Forsyth Entertainment Award	I'm a Celebrity...Get Me Out of Here!
2020	Most Popular TV Presenter	
2021	The Bruce Forsyth Entertainment Award	I'm a Celebrity...Get Me Out of Here!
2021	Most Popular TV Presenter	
2022	The Bruce Forsyth Entertainment Award	I'm a Celebrity...Get Me Out of Here!
2022	Most Popular TV Presenter	
2023	Most Popular TV Presenter	
2024	The Bruce Forsyth Entertainment Award	I'm a Celebrity...Get Me Out of Here!
2024	Most Popular TV Presenter	

=== NTAs by number won ===
Award	Won
Most Popular Entertainment/TV Presenter	23
Most Popular Entertainment Programme	11
The Bruce Forsyth Entertainment Award	6
Most Popular Reality Programme	3
Challenge Show	2
Special Recognition Award	1
Most Popular Quiz Programme	1
Landmark Award	1

=== NTAs by show number won ===
Show	Won
I'm A Celebrity...Get Me Out of Here!	15
Ant & Dec's Saturday Night Takeaway	6
Pop Idol	1
SMTV Live	1
Ant & Dec's Gameshow Marathon	1

Nominations/Awards that they didn't win

Year	Award	Show
2001	They won all their awards in 2001	
2002	They won all their awards in 2002	
2003	They won all their awards in 2003	
2004	Most Popular Entertainment Programme	Pop Idol
2004	Most Popular Reality Programme	I'm a Celebrity...Get Me Out of Here!
2005	Most Popular Entertainment Programme	Ant & Dec's Saturday Night Takeaway
2005	Most Popular Reality Programme	I'm a Celebrity...Get Me Out of Here!
2006	Most Popular Entertainment Programme	Ant & Dec's Saturday Night Takeaway
2007	Most Popular Talent Show	Britain's Got Talent
2008	Most Popular Entertainment Programme	Ant & Dec's Saturday Night Takeaway
2008	Most Popular Entertainment Programme	I'm a Celebrity...Get Me Out of Here!
2008	Most Popular Talent Show	Britain's Got Talent
2009	There were no NTAs in 2009	
2010	Most Popular Entertainment Programme	I'm a Celebrity...Get Me Out of Here!
2010	Most Popular Talent Show	Britain's Got Talent
2011	Most Popular Talent Show	Britain's Got Talent
2012	Most Popular Talent Show	Britain's Got Talent
2013	Most Popular Talent Show	Britain's Got Talent
2014	Entertainment Programme	Ant & Dec's Saturday Night Takeaway
2014	Talent Show	Britain's Got Talent
2015	Entertainment Programme	Ant & Dec's Saturday Night Takeaway
2015	Talent Show	Britain's Got Talent
2016	Entertainment Programme	Ant & Dec's Saturday Night Takeaway
2016	Talent Show	Britain's Got Talent
2017	Talent Show	Britain's Got Talent
2018	Talent Show	Britain's Got Talent
2019	The Bruce Forysth Entertainment Award	Ant & Dec's Saturday Night Takeaway
2019	Talent Show	Britain's Got Talent
2020	Talent Show	Britain's Got Talent
2021	The Bruce Forsyth Entertainment Award	Ant & Dec's Saturday Night Takeaway
2021	Talent Show	Britain's Got Talent
2022	The Bruce Forsyth Entertainment Award	Ant & Dec's Saturday Night Takeaway
2022	Talent Show	Britain's Got Talent
2023	The Bruce Forsyth Entertainment Award	Ant & Dec's Saturday Night Takeaway
2023	The Bruce Forsyth Entertainment Award	I'm a Celebrity...Get Me Out of Here!
2023	Talent Show	Britain's Got Talent
2024	The Bruce Forsyth Entertainment Award	Ant & Dec's Saturday Night Takeaway
2024	Quiz Game Show	Ant & Dec's Limitless Win
2024	Talent Show	Britain's Got Talent
