= Miriam Díaz Aroca =

Spanish actress and television presenter (born 1962)

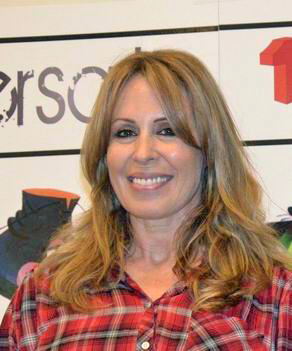
- Miriam Díaz-Aroca in 2012
- Born: Margarita Miriam Díaz Aroca; 4 March 1962 (age 64); Madrid, Spain
- Occupations: Actress, television presenter
- Years active: 1987–present
- Spouse(s): Pedro Luis Llorente (1993–2000); Stuart Grant Washington (2004–2012)
- Children: 2

Margarita Miriam Díaz Aroca (born 4 March 1962, in Madrid) is a Spanish actress and television presenter.

== Biography ==
Miriam Díaz Aroca was born on 4 March 1962 in Madrid but grew up in Santander (Cantabria). She studied Journalism in Complutense University of Madrid. She began working on Radio Minuto Fórmula of Cadena SER as a radio hostess and control technician.

Her first appearance on-screen was in the Spanish TV music program Aplauso in 1979 as a contestant on the section La juventud baila, being placed in third position (25.000 pesetas) . Professionally, she debuts accompanying Javier Basilio in the Televisión Española contest El bote de Don Basilio, which was broadcast on the program of Jesús Hermida Por la mañana (1987–88). She then went on to present a children's television show entitled Cajón desastre (1988-1991). She co-presented the television game show Un, dos, tres... responda otra vez with Jordi Estadella (1991-1993).

In 1990 she participated as a singer in an album with 11 songs called Chicos of the brand CBS, which has as a hit Merlin the Spanish version of Shattered Dreams by the English group Johnny Hates Jazz

In movies, Pedro Almodóvar selected her to play a small role as a radio hostess for the deaf in the film High Heels (1991). Her consecration as an actress would come with Clara's character in the Academy Award winning picture Belle Époque (1992), by Fernando Trueba.

Miriam has two children, a male (Pedro Luis Llorente Jr., 1994) and a female (María Washington, 2004).

She also participated as an actress in the TV comedy La casa de los líos (1996-1999) of Antena 3, with Arturo Fernandez, in the sitcom ¡Ala... Dina! (2001-2002) of TVE, and between 2004 and 2006 played the role of Claudia Valladares in Mis adorables vecinos of Antena 3. Also in 2006 she participated in the TV contest ¡Mira quién baila!. In 2009, José Luis Moreno gave her the main role in the comedy series ¡A ver si llego! with just five chapters aired given the low ratings.

She also works on theater, she took part in the Festival of Classical Theatre of Mérida in 2007 with the play Lysistrata; she starred in the 101 Dalmatians theater adaptation as Cruella de Vil; in 2009 she starred with María Barranco in the play Adulterios; and participated in 2011 with María Luisa Merlo and Jorge Roelas in the play 100 metros cuadrados of Juan Carlos Rubio.

She is the writer of the show Madame Noir of Monica Naranjo (2011).

In the fourth and final week of January 2003 she was the cover of Interviú magazine.

== Filmography ==
=== Film ===
Year	Title	Role	Director	Notes
1991	High Heels	Isabel	Pedro Almodóvar	
1992	Belle Époque	Clara	Fernando Trueba	
1996	Los Porretas		Carlos Suárez	
1997	Carreteras secundarias		Emilio Martínez Lázaro	
2000	El paraíso ya no es lo que era		Francesc Betriu	
2001	La mujer de mi vida		Antonio del Real	
2004	XXL		Julio Sánchez Valdés	
2004	Isi/Disi. Amor a lo bestia		Chema de la Peña	
2010	Clara, no es nombre de mujer		Pepe Carbajo	

=== Television ===
Year	Title	Role	Network	Notes
1987 - 1988	Por la mañana	Herself	Televisión Española	Host
1989 - 1990	Cajón desastre	Herself	Televisión Española	Host
1991 - 1993	Un, dos, tres... responda otra vez	Herself	Televisión Española	Host
1993 - 1994	Noches de gala	Herself	Televisión Española	Host
1994 - 1995	No te rías, que es peor	Herself	Televisión Española	Host
1996 - 1999	La casa de los líos	Manuela Bellapart Valdés	Antena 3	
1999	Manos a la obra		Antena 3	3 episodes
2001 - 2002	¡Ala... Dina!	Dina	Televisión Española	
2004 - 2006	Mis adorables vecinos	Claudia Valladares Roig	Antena 3	
2006	¡Mira quién baila!	Herself	Televisión Española	Contestant Season 3 - 5th place
2006	Empieza el espectáculo			
2009	¡A ver si llego!			
2013	Splash! Famosos al agua	Herself	Antena 3	Contestant

=== Theatre ===
Year	Title
2001 - 2002	The 101 Dalmatians
2007 - 2008	Lisístrata
2009 - 2010	Adulterios
2010 - 2012	100 Metros Cuadrados
2011 - 2012	Madame Noir (Writer)
2012	Ni para ti, ni para mí

=== Others ===
Year	Work	Title	Notes
2010	Videoclip	Caso Perdido	of Lara Pinilla

== Externals ==
- Miriam Díaz-Aroca at IMDb
- Official Site
- Chicos
