= Sinatra (1988 film) =

- Theatrical release poster
- Directed by: Francesc Betriu
- Written by: Francesc Betriu; Raúl Núñez
- Based on: Sinatra by Raúl Núñez
- Produced by: Enrique Viciano
- Starring: Alfredo Landa; Ana Obregón; Maribel Verdú; Manuel Alexandre; Julita Martínez; Luis Ciges; Queta Claver; Carlos Lucena; Joaquín Sabina
- Cinematography: Carlos Suárez
- Edited by: Teresa Alcocer
- Music by: Joaquín Sabina
- Production company: Ideas y Producciones Cinematográficas
- Distributed by: United International Pictures
- Release date: 13 May 1988
- Country: Spain
- Language: Spanish

Sinatra is a 1988 Spanish melodrama film directed by Francesc Betriu based on Raúl Núñez's homonymous novel. It stars Alfredo Landa as the title character alongside Ana Obregón and Maribel Verdú.

== Plot ==
Set in Barcelona, the plot follows the plight of perpetual loser Antonio Castro aka "Sinatra", a Frank Sinatra imitator working in an El Paralelo club who is abandoned by his wife, and then comes across the likes of young drug-addict Natalia, transvestite La Rosita, and sex worker Isabel.

== Cast ==
- Alfredo Landa as Antonio Castro "Sinatra"
- Maribel Verdú as Natalia
- Ana Obregón as Isabel
- Antonio Suárez as la Rosita
- Pilar Rebollar as Begonia
- Víctor Pí as Juan Cuevas Heredia
- Luis Ciges as el Lagarto
- Carlos Lucena
- Queta Claver
- Manuel Alexandre
- Julita Martínez as Hortensia
- Berti Tobías as Blanco Sol
- Joaquín Sabina as Groucho Marx impersonator

== Production ==
The film is an Ideas y Producciones Cinematográficas production.

== Release ==
The film was released theatrically on 13 May 1988. It grossed 38,372,395 ₧ (107,098 admissions).

== Reception ==
Ángel Luis Inurria of El País assessed that the film's main flaw "lies in the situational reiteration" [...] which "achieves disinterest and causes boredom".

== Accolades ==
Year	Award	Category	Nominee(s)	Result	Ref.
1989	3rd Goya Awards	Best Actor	Alfredo Landa	Nominated	

== See also ==
- List of Spanish films of 1988
