= Miguel Ángel Tirado =

Spanish comedian

- Born: 13 November 1949 (age 76); Zaragoza, Spain
- Other name: Marianico el Corto
- Years active: 1982-present

Miguel Ángel Tirado Vinués (born 13 November 1949) better known by his comedic persona Marianico el Corto, is a Spanish comedian.

He became famous with his comedic character Marianico el Corto ("short Marianico") a stereotypical Aragonese villager person with a strong accent who always wears white shirt, vest, red sash and beret.

== Biography ==
He was born in the neighborhood of Torrero in Zaragoza, in Aragón (Spain), on 13 November 1949. He is married and has 4 children.

In 1982 he began his artistic career participating in the radio program 5.º Programa of Radio Zaragoza and begins to perform in pubs. In 1989 he appears in the TV programs Directo en la Noche and Si lo sé no vengo.

In 1990 he became very popular for his participation in the humor contest No te rías que es peor where he collaborated until 1993. He later participated in the Telecinco TV programs "Muchas Gracias" and "Sonría, por favor" (1996).

Between 1995 and 1996 he performed in the musical play "Los reclutas piden guerra" and between 1998 y 1999 in the play "Esta fonda es la monda". He also performed in 2000 in the play "La Alcaldía... ¡Va Bien!". Other plays were "Un fantasma en los Monegros", "Un cubano en la familia" and "Un maño en Nueva York" (2009)

In 2013 he co-hosted the Aragón TV program Me gusta Aragón alongside Adriana Abenia.

In 2020 he produced and starred in the series El último show on Aragón TV, a dramedy in which Tirado plays a fictional version of himself.
