= Wetten, dass..? =

German television show

- Genre: Game show Talk show Variety show
- Created by: Frank Elstner
- Presented by: Main host: Frank Elstner (1981–1987); Thomas Gottschalk (1987–1992, 1994–2011, 2021–2023); Wolfgang Lippert (1992–1993); Markus Lanz (2012–2014); Sidekick: Michelle Hunziker (2009–2011, 2021–2022); Cindy aus Marzahn (2012–2013)
- Countries of origin: West Germany (1981–1990); Germany (1990–2014, 2021–); Austria; Switzerland
- Original language: German
- No. of episodes: 155 (Gottschalk); 39 (Elstner); 12 (Lanz); 9 (Lippert); Total: 215

Production
- Production locations: West Germany (1981–1990); Germany (1990–2014, 2021–); Austria; Switzerland
- Running time: 150–180 minutes

Original release
- Network: ZDF (Germany); ORF (Austria); SF DRS (Switzerland) (1981–2011, 2021–)
- Release: 14 February 1981 – 13 December 2014
- Release: 2 November 2021 – present

Wetten, dass..? (German pronunciation: [ˈvɛtn̩ ˈdas]; German for "Wanna bet that..?") is a German-language Saturday entertainment television show. It is the largest and most successful television show in Europe. Its format was the basis for the British show You Bet! and the American show Wanna Bet?

The shows were broadcast live six to eight times a year from different cities in Germany, Austria, and Switzerland. There were also seven open-air summer shows, broadcast from Amphitheatre Xanten, Plaça de Toros de Palma de Mallorca, Disneyland Paris, Waldbühne Berlin, and Aspendos Roman Theatre. Each of the shows, which were shown without commercial interruption, was usually scheduled to last for about two to three hours, but it was not uncommon for a show to run as much as 45 minutes longer.

The game show gained great popularity in the German-speaking countries through the presenters Frank Elstner, who was also the creator, and Thomas Gottschalk in the 1980s and 1990s. After that, especially due to the takeover of Markus Lanz, the audience ratings dropped significantly, which caused the discontinuation of the show in 2014. From 2021 to 2023, Thomas Gottschalk returned for one episode each year.

== History ==
On 14 February 1981, the German channel ZDF broadcast the first episode in cooperation with the Austrian broadcaster ORF and the Swiss channel SF DRS as a Eurovision network show. The inventor of the show, Frank Elstner, hosted the show until its 39th episode in 1987. Wetten, dass..? has since been hosted by entertainer Thomas Gottschalk, except during a brief interval from 1992 to 1993, when nine episodes were presented by Wolfgang Lippert. Gottschalk hosted his 100th episode of the show on 27 March 2004.

In summer 2007, Wetten, dass..? had its first show in 16:9 widescreen. Since late 2009, Michelle Hunziker has assisted Gottschalk in hosting the show. The show on 27 February 2010 was the first show broadcast in HD. Thomas Gottschalk left the show on 3 December 2011, the end of the 2011 season, because of an accident involving Samuel Koch, a 23-year-old man who became a quadriplegic due to a stunt which he performed on the show on 4 December 2010.

After long speculations who would take over the show, ZDF announced on 11 March 2012 that Markus Lanz would be the next presenter. His first show was on 6 October 2012 and the last show was on 13 December 2014.

The show got a satirical homage with fake bets in 2016 for two episodes of 45 minutes each. It was hosted by comedian Jan Böhmermann.

On 6 November 2021, Gottschalk moderated a one-off repeat of Wetten, dass...?

== List of hosts ==
Host	From		To		Notes	No. of episodes
Host	Date	Age	Date	Age	Notes	No. of episodes
Frank Elstner	14 February 1981	38	4 April 1987	44	Creator and first host	39
Thomas Gottschalk	26 September 1987	37	2 May 1992	41	Most popular host	37
Wolfgang Lippert	26 September 1992	40	27 November 1993	41	Shortest-running host of the original show	9
Thomas Gottschalk	15 January 1994	43	3 December 2011	61	Michelle Hunziker (co-host from 2009 to 2011)	116
Markus Lanz	6 October 2012	43	13 December 2014	45	Cindy aus Marzahn (co-host from 2012 to 2013)	12
Thomas Gottschalk	6 November 2021	71	25 November 2023	73	Michelle Hunziker (co-host from 2021 to 2022)	3

== Concept ==
The core gimmick of the show was the bets: ordinary people offer to perform some unusual (often bizarre) and difficult tasks. Some examples, all of which were performed successfully, include:

- Lighting a pocket lighter using an excavator's shovel (19 February 1983)
- Assembling a V8 engine from parts and making it run within 9 minutes (2 November 1991)
- 13 swimmers towing a 312-tonne ship over a distance of 25 meters (7 October 1995)
- Recognising 5 of 6 (out of a total of 75) species of birds blindfolded by feeling a single feather (9 November 2002)
- A Chinese martial artist pushing a car with a spear, the tip of which was resting on his throat
- A nine-year-old boy from Vienna computing the shortest bus and railcar routes throughout the city from memory
- A blindfolded farmer recognizing his cows by the sound they made while chewing apples
- A blacksmith hammering a piece of metal to light a cigarette by kinetic energy, which became famous as a meme named: "Mikaeli, you successfully hit metal 17 times."

The other major attraction of the show was the top-ranking celebrity guests, with considerable screen time given to the host greeting and chatting with them. Each of the guests had to bet on the outcome of one of the performances and offer a wager, in recent years usually a humorous or mildly humiliating, originally more charitable, activity to be carried out if they lose. Until 1987, each of the celebrities bet on all the performances and the most accurate one was selected to be that show's Wettkönig ("bet king"). Ever since, one of the people performing the task is selected by a telephone vote. Celebrities that have appeared on the show included a vast range of personalities, with repeated guests including the likes of Britney Spears, Jennifer Lopez, Tom Cruise, Angelina Jolie, Cameron Diaz, Naomi Campbell, Michael Douglas, Michael Jackson, Jennifer Aniston, David Beckham, Hugh Grant, Arnold Schwarzenegger, Claudia Schiffer, Heidi Klum, Bill Gates, Karl Lagerfeld, Mikhail Gorbachev, and Gerhard Schröder.

Additionally, until 2001, members of the audience could offer bets against the host to find a certain number of unusual persons (e.g. 10 ladies over the age of 65 driving motorbikes). One of these was selected at the beginning of the show and had to be fulfilled by its end. Since 2001, the host bet against the entire city where the show is held.

Between the bets and the celebrity smalltalk, there were musical performances by top-ranking artists like Shania Twain, Johnny Cash, Phil Collins, Take That, Jennifer Lopez, Coldplay, OneRepublic, Rihanna, Spice Girls, Kiss, t.A.T.u., Whitney Houston, Katy Perry, Madonna, Kylie Minogue, Anastacia, Avril Lavigne, Christina Stürmer, Bryan Adams, Shakira, Britney Spears, Scorpions, Bon Jovi, Meat Loaf, Elton John, Tokio Hotel, Justin Bieber, Miley Cyrus, Ashley Tisdale, Joe Cocker, Lady Gaga, Luciano Pavarotti, Celine Dion, Christina Aguilera, Mariah Carey, Robert Plant, Status Quo, Leona Lewis, David Bowie, Bruno Mars, Cher, Tina Turner, Depeche Mode and Michael Jackson.

== Cancellation and revival ==
=== Samuel Koch incident ===
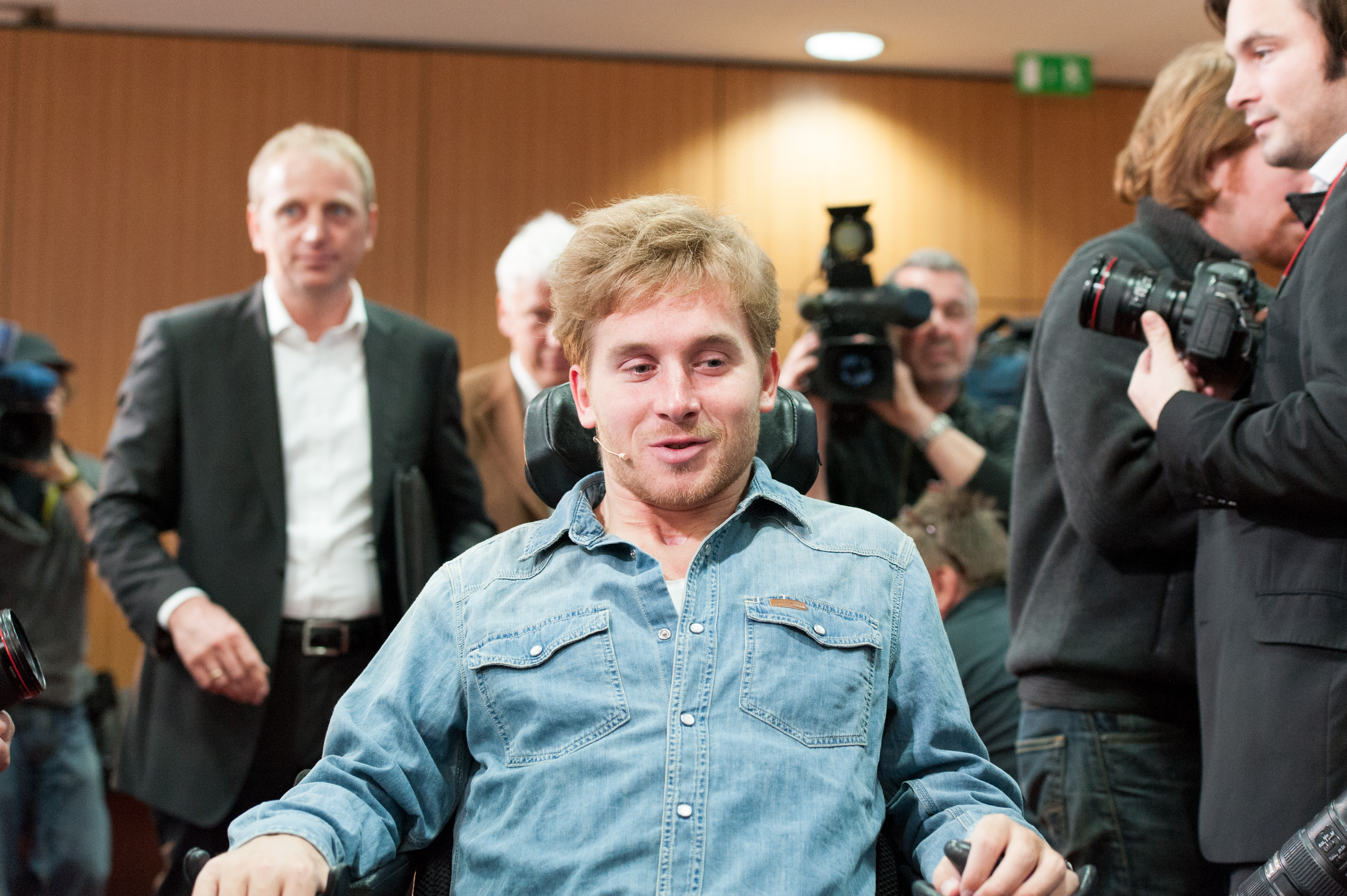
Koch in a power wheelchair in 2012

Samuel Koch, a 23-year-old aspiring stuntman-turned-actor, became a quadriplegic during a stunt performed on the show on 4 December 2010. The incident was broadcast live on German television. Koch took on a challenge to jump over five moving cars of gradually increasing size using spring-loaded boots. Koch failed to clear the fourth car, driven by his own father. Koch's head hit the windshield and he landed on the studio floor, fracturing two cervical vertebrae and damaging his spinal cord.

Koch survived after emergency surgery, but as of 2011 he is permanently paralyzed from the neck down. The episode was suspended and then taken off air about 20 minutes later, for the first time in the program's history. In the following episode host Thomas Gottschalk announced his resignation, leaving after the last installment of the 2011 season.

=== Decline ===
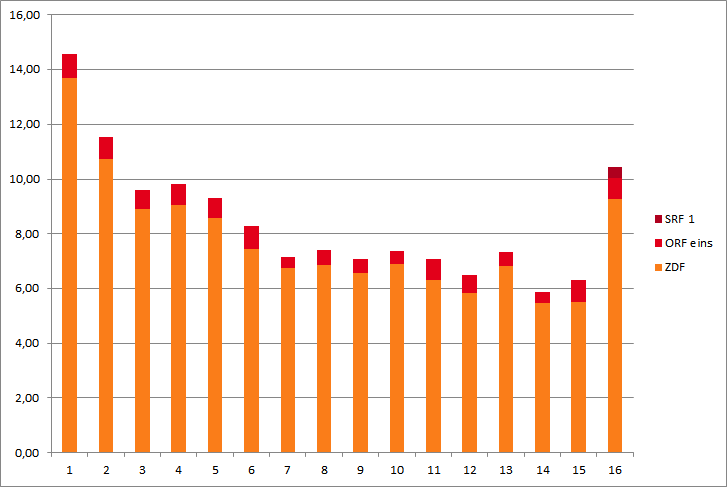
Audience ratings since the first broadcast with Markus Lanz on 6 October 2012

Following Gottschalk's retirement, ZDF TV host Markus Lanz took over the hosting of the show (debuting on 6 October 2012). However, his approach to the show did not meet public or critical approval, causing the show to experience a drastic ratings loss. Eventually, with the conclusion of the 2014 Offenburg show (5 April 2014), it was announced that the show would be cancelled at the close of 2014, official statements claiming "out-moded concepts" as the main reason for this decision. This announcement drew protests from both Frank Elstner and Thomas Gottschalk. However, it was also stated that an eventual revival would be considered.

The 215th and last regular show was broadcast on 13 December 2014 from Nuremberg, with Samuel Koch – who never blamed Wetten, dass..? or Gottschalk for his condition – being one of the prominent guests.

=== Revival ===
On 28 July 2018, ZDF announced a one-evening revival of Wetten, dass..?, owing to the occasion of Gottschalk's upcoming 70th birthday (18 May 2020). It was later announced that the special would not happen in 2020 due to the COVID-19 pandemic. It was instead relegated to air live on 6 November 2021. The special became an instant ratings hit, scoring nearly 14 million views, prompting ZDF to consider a full comeback of the show.

With the success of the 2021 show, another broadcast of Wetten, dass...? was scheduled for 15 November 2022 out of Friedrichshafen, hosted once again by Thomas Gottschalk. In August 2023, however, Gottschalk announced his ultimate retirement from hosting the show, with the last one being the broadcast on 25 November the same year. This announcement drew hefty criticism from his fanbase.

In January 2026, twin music performers Bill and Tom Kaulitz, former members of the band Tokio Hotel, announced their intention to host one episode of the show scheduled for December 5 of the same year at Halle an der Saale, with more appearances planned if proven a success. Their stated intention is to "bring the show to a younger generation's attention". Frank Elstner expressed his positive expectations about the ZDF's choice as a "daring experiment".

Public and critical expectations towards the new hosts resulted in a record tickets sale, with 78,000 prospective spectators registering for the ticket lottery within the first two hours. Upon the announcement that Thomas Gottschalk and his wife Karina would not be attending their debut due to a private appointment on the same date, the Kaulitz Brothers reacted with ironic comments like, "There must always be somebody who will not be watching". Frank Elstner also declined to attend the premiere personally, citing his age (84 at the time) and the related stress of having to travel from his residence in Baden-Baden to Halle for the show.

== International versions ==
In the Netherlands, a version was broadcast between 1984 and 1999 under the name Wedden, dat..? by the AVRO and (from the early nineties) RTL 4. The Dutch shows were hosted by Jos Brink until 1993, after which Rolf Wouters took over. Reinout Oerlemans presented the show for one season in 1999.

Wetten, dass..? inspired the British series You Bet!. It was produced by London Weekend Television and was broadcast on ITV from 1988 to 1997. The hosts were Bruce Forsyth (1988–1990), Matthew Kelly (1991–1995), and Darren Day (1996–1997). In August 2024, ITV announced that the show would be returning for two 75-minute episodes later that year with Stephen Mulhern and Holly Willoughby as hosts.

In October 2004, Wetten, dass..? also started on Chinese television under the title Wanna Challenge (as gambling is illegal in China). It is shown once a week and reaches 60 million viewers each episode.

In 1998, a Slovenian version of Wetten, dass..? started weekly on POP TV under the title Super Pop hosted by Stojan Auer. There were initiations of close production connections with the original Wetten, dass..?, but the show was canceled because of high production costs before any further common productions were made.

The show was also broadcast with great success in Italy by Rai 1 from 1991 to 1996 (and then in 1999, 2001, and 2003) with the title Scommettiamo che...?. In 2008, it was taken up again by Rai 2. It has had ten seasons.

In 2005 and 2006, a Polish version was broadcast under the name Załóż się.

In 2006 and 2007, a Russian version was broadcast on the Channel One under the name Большой спор (Bolshoy Spor, literally A Big Betting). The host was Dmitry Nagiev. The show was closed after the seventh episode due to its low popularity.

¿Qué apostamos? is the Spanish version of the show. It originally ran on Spain's national broadcaster TVE 1 between 4 May 1993 and 30 June 2000. The show was fronted by Ramón García, accompanied by Ana Obregón (1993–1998), Antonia Dell'Atte (1998–1999), Raquel Navamuel, and Mónica Martínez (2000). If the audience bet was completed, the person who placed the bet had to be drenched in water, and if it was not completed, one of the presenters or guests had to take the water shower. In 2008, the Spanish federation of regional TV stations operating under the FORTA umbrella later recovered the format, hosted by Carlos Lozano and Rocío Madrid, but the revival was short-lived and was swiftly axed due to low ratings and the high cost of producing the programme.

In 2006, ABC signed with reality producer Phil Gurin of The Gurin Company to develop an American version of the show. Six episodes were broadcast in July–September 2008, hosted by British duo Ant & Dec. This is not the first time the show has been produced for American audiences; in 1993, CBS broadcast a pilot called Wanna Bet?, hosted by Mark McEwen, which was not picked up as a full series.

There are also plans to show Wetten, dass..? in India, Northern Africa, and the Middle East.

Country	Title	Broadcaster(s)	Presenter(s)	Premiere	Finale
United Kingdom	You Bet!	ITV	Bruce Forsyth (1988–1990); Matthew Kelly (1991–1995); Darren Day (1996–1997)	20 February 1988	12 April 1997
United Kingdom	You Bet!	ITV	Stephen Mulhern and Holly Willoughby	7 December 2024	27 December 2025
United States	Wanna Bet?	CBS (1993); ABC (21 July – 2 September 2008)	Mark McEwen and Gordon Elliott (1993); Ant & Dec (2008)	21 April 1993	2 September 2008
Netherlands; Belgium (Flanders)	Wedden, dat..?	AVRO (1986–1989); RTL 4 (1990–1995, 1999); Veronica TV (1996–1997); VTM	Jos Brink (1986–1992); Rolf Wouters (1993–1997); Reinout Oerlemans (1999)	1986	1999
France	Toute la ville en parle	TF1	Guillaume Durand (October – December 1992); Alexandre Debanne	10 October 1992	20 February 1993
Spain	¿Qué apostamos?	La 1 (4 May 1993 – 30 June 2000); FORTA (2 February – 31 May 2008)	Ramón García and Ana Obregón (1993–1998); Ramón García and Antonia Dell'Atte (1998–1999); Ramón García, Raquel Navamuel and Mónica Martínez (2000); Carlos Lozano and Rocío Madrid (2008)	4 May 1993	31 May 2008
Greece	Είσαι Μέσα; Eisai Mesa	Alpha TV	Viki Kagia	2008	2008
China	想挑战吗? Xiang tiaozhan ma?	CCTV-3	?	2004	2010
Russia	Большой спор Bolschoy spor	Channel One Russia	Dmitri Nagiev	17 February 2006	8 July 2007
Slovenia	Super Pop	POP TV	Stojan Auer	1998	1998
Poland	Załóż się	TVP2	Main: Steffen Möller (series 1); Piotr Szwedes (series 2); Co-hosts: Anna Popek (series 1–2); Rafał Bryndal	30 September 2005	16 June 2006
Italy	Scommettiamo che...?	Rai 1 (1991–2003); Rai 2 (2008)	Fabrizio Frizzi and Milly Carlucci (1991–1996); Fabrizio Frizzi and Afef (1999–2000); Fabrizio Frizzi and Valeria Mazza (2001); Marco Columbro and Lorella Cuccarini (2003); Alessandro Cecchi Paone and Matilde Brandi (2008)	6 April 1991	28 May 2008
Italy	Vuoi scommettere?	Canale 5	Michelle Hunziker with Aurora Ramazzotti	17 May 2018	14 June 2018
Vietnam	Kèo này ai thắng	VTV3	Liêu Hà Trinh; Nguyên Khang	16 January 2020	14 May 2020

== See also ==
- Banzai (TV series)
- The Late, Late Breakfast Show, British show cancelled in 1986 after a fatal audience stunt
