= ¿Qué apostamos? =

- Genre: Game show
- Based on: Wetten, dass..?
- Country of origin: Spain
- Original language: Spanish
- No. of seasons: 8
- No. of episodes: 110

Production
- Running time: 120–130 min approx

Original release
- Network: La Primera
- Release: 4 May 1993 – 30 June 2000
- Network: FORTA channels (Note: La 7 (31 January 2008–24 April 2008), Castilla-La Mancha Televisión (1 February 2008–4 May 2008), Telemadrid (2 February 2008–8 March 2008), Canal 9 (4 February 2008–19 May 2008), Aragón TV (8 February 2008–11 May 2008), and Canal Sur (8 March 2008–8 August 2008).)
- Release: 31 January – 8 August 2008

¿Qué apostamos? (English: What do we bet?) is the Spanish version of the German prime-time television game show Wetten, dass..?. It was broadcast nationwide live on La Primera Cadena of Televisión Española (TVE) for seven seasons from 1993 to 2000 and on some regional broadcasters of the Federation of Regional Organizations of Radio and Television (FORTA) for an additional season in 2008. On the show, ordinary people offer to achieve some unusual and very difficult tasks while top-ranking celebrity guests bet on the outcomes.

== Format ==
Seasons one to seven were produced by Europroducciones and Televisión Española (TVE), which broadcast it live in prime-time on its Primera Cadena nationwide. It followed the format of Scommettiamo che...?, the Italian version of Wetten, dass..?. It was hosted by Ramón García along with Ana Obregón (seasons 1–5), Antonia Dell'Atte (season 6), and Raquel Navamuel and Mónica Martínez (season 7), and featured an orchestra directed by Eduardo Leiva, who also helped the hosts.

Each episode featured four bettors –ordinary people who offered to perform some unusual and very difficult tasks– and four celebrity guests who, starting from an initial amount of money, bet for or against the bettor. The celebrity who accumulated the most money in the end was the winner and the amount achieved was distributed among the four bettors according to the ranking in the televote of the public who voted for the bet they would have liked the most. (Note: Fifty per cent for first place, twenty-five per cent for second, fifteen per cent for third, and ten per cent for fourth.)

One of the guests in each episode used to be a top international celebrity. These included Sophia Loren, Gina Lollobrigida, Catherine Deneuve, Mia Farrow, Cher, Alain Delon, Marcello Mastroianni, Ursula Andress, Gérard Depardieu, Christopher Reeve, Naomi Campbell, Claudia Schiffer, Joan Collins. Tippi Hedren, Jeremy Irons, Roger Moore and Jean-Claude Van Damme.

Three of the bets were carried out in the studio and a fourth on a remote location –usually the third in the order of the program–, known as "outdoors bet". The bets were unusual and surprising, ranging from great skill, precision, extreme strength or great memorization or numerical calculation abilities, often against the clock. During all editions, more than two hundred different bets were made, including:

- Guess a song by observing the movements that the sound caused in a lit candle.
- Place a fire truck on four glass glasses.
- Identify a board game by shaking the wrapped game box.
- Recognize any song performed in the Eurovision Song Contest with just a phrase read in its original language.
- Climb Torrespaña to the dome faster than the tower's elevator.
- Put twenty-six people in a SEAT 600.
- Guess the trademark of a piano by listening to just one note.

An additional bet was done in each episode. Members of the audience could challenge the show to gather a number of people with a certain characteristic (e.g. one hundred people playing the accordion). One of these bets was selected at the beginning of the show and had to be fulfilled by its end. If said bet was achieved, the bettor had to take a live shower. If not, it was one of the hosts or the guests who received the punishment.

As some bets required a lot of space, a large marquee was built in the Prado del Rey grounds with everything necessary to produce the show. This temporary marquee was the set of the first three seasons. From the fourth season onwards, the show was made at studio 3 of Estudios Buñuel –TVE's largest studio and one of the largest in Europe at the time, but smaller than the marquee–.

Season eight was produced by Europroducciones for some regional broadcasters of the Federation of Regional Organizations of Radio and Television (FORTA). It was broadcast by La 7, Castilla-La Mancha Televisión, Telemadrid, Canal 9, Aragón TV, Canal Extremadura and Canal Sur in their respective regions and was hosted by Carlos Lozano and Rocío Madrid. It was a more modest show with a much smaller budget, was recorded in advance in a smaller studio, had no bets on remote locations or an orchestra, and only invited local celebrities.

== Episodes ==
Season	Episodes	Originally released		
Season	Episodes	First released	Last released	Network
1	14	4 May 1993	3 August 1993	La Primera
2	14	21 April 1994	22 July 1994	La Primera
3	14	20 January 1995	5 May 1995	La Primera
4	15	20 September 1996	3 January 1997	La Primera
5	13	10 October 1997	2 January 1998	La Primera
6	14	9 October 1998	8 January 1999	La Primera
7	13	31 March 2000	30 June 2000	La Primera
8	13	January–August 2008		FORTA

== Hosts ==
Hosts	Seasons								Ep.
Hosts	1	2	3	4	5	6	7	8	Ep.
Ramón García	Host								97
Ana Obregón	Host								70
Antonia Dell'Atte						H			14
Raquel Navamuel							H		13
Mónica Martínez							H		13
Carlos Lozano								H	13
Rocío Madrid								H	13

== Accolades ==
=== Tp de Oro ===
Year	Category	Recipient	Result	Ref.
1995	Best Game Show		Won	
1995	Best Presenter	Ramón García (Note: For his work in ¿Qué apostamos?, El Grand Prix del verano and Aquí jugamos todos.)	Nominated	
1996	Best Game Show		Nominated	
1996	Best Presenter	Ramón García (Note: For his work in ¿Qué apostamos? and El Grand Prix del verano.)	Nominated	
1997	Best Game Show		Won	
1997	Best Presenter	Ramón García	Nominated	
1998	Best Presenter	Ramón García (Note: For his work in ¿Qué apostamos?, El Grand Prix del verano and La llamada de la suerte.)	Nominated	

=== ATV Awards ===
Year	Category	Result	Ref.
1998	Entertainment: varieties and game shows	Nominated	

== Argentine version ==
In 1995, the show had its own version in Argentina on Canal 9 Libertad. Hosted by Julio Lagos, it used the logo, theme song, and opening of the Spanish version, from which it used footage extensively. The show combined live segments produced locally with recorded segments from Spain.
