= 2024 Grand Prix stamp controversy =

Spanish television controversy

- Part of Television in Spain
- Date: December 31, 2024
- Location: Spain
- Type: Incident
- Participants: Laura Yustres

On 31 December 2024, during the broadcast of the New Year bells on Spanish TV channel La 1, Spanish actress and comic Laura Yustres, also known as Lalachus, showed a picture of the Sacred Heart with the cow mascot from game show El Grand Prix del verano photoshopped onto it.

== Context ==
Lalachus is a frequent collaborator with David Broncano on his successful La 1 chat show La revuelta. The show's surprise success led to a months-long rivalry with El Hormiguero on rival channel Antena 3. Both Lalachus and Broncano were in charge of hosting the end of the year bells on La 1. When it became public, Lalachus was criticised through social media due to a social stigma of obesity.

An article in El País titled "Los kilos de Chicote y Lalachus" suggested some double standards were in play, in that Lalachus was criticised for her obesity merely for being a woman, while the same criticism was spared for Alberto Chicote, the presenter of the bells on Antena 3, for being a man. Writing for 20minutos, TV critic Borja Terán opined that Lalachus' selection "represents a generation which doesn't accept that bodies be subject to debate."

During the broadcast, Broncano and Lalachus played several pranks, such as greeting the hosts of the bells on Antena 3, Chicote and Cristina Pedroche, which some media outlets considered "TV history in Spain". Their coverage attracted record audiences, with a peak share of 33.1%, and beating the Antena 3 broadcast in the ratings for the first time since 2021/22.

== Controversy ==
External videos
- Video of Lalachus showing the Grand Prix stamp

During the last few seconds of 2024, Lalachus showed to the camera a picture of the Sacred Heart, with the iconic heifer from game show El Grand Prix del verano. She showed the picture, while defending public television and saying:

I always carry my picture of the Grand Prix cow with me. It's the best, listen to me, we've all grown up watching Grand Prix. How important television is, the public one in this case more than any other because it has made the whole family get around the TV enjoying it greatly and also, you, I and many people are made of bits of TV...

The image has been widely used and subject to parody, recreated with singers, athletes and all types of public figures who have been 'sanctified', always in a joking tone or as a meme. However, Lalachus' actions were criticised both on social networks and by religious associations. Other prints, meanwhile, of Fernando Alonso, Pedri and Juanmi Jiménez have passed without controversy. The precedents that exist show that it is very difficult for the complaint to be heard. Since 1995, when the Penal Code introduced Article 525 with the current wording of the crime of offending religious feelings, there has been only one final conviction. It was in 2018, when a young man from Jaén had to pay a fine of €480 for publishing a photomontage of the Sacred Heart with his own face photoshopped on Instagram.

== Complaints ==
Conservative groups CitizenGO and Abogados Cristianos announced on 1 January 2025 that they would sue Lalachus, Broncano, network RTVE and its president José Pablo López for "a possible hate crime against religious feelings". On 2 January 2025, the Spanish Episcopal Conference said that it was joining the case.

== Reactions ==
Since the incident, several people have taken a stand for or against Lalachus:

=== Against ===
Javier Tebas, president of La Liga, heavily criticised Lalachus, as did influencer Tomás Páramo. The Archbishop of Seville, José Ángel Saiz Meneses, also criticised the programme. Luis Argüello, president of the Spanish Episcopal Conference, called it a "mockery". Actor José Manuel Soto also said that "to take advantage of the moment with the biggest audience of the year to mock Christ and all Catholics gives an idea of the moral rot of those who direct public TV in Spain".

Journalist Iranzu García, from digital Catholic newspaper El Debate, criticised Lalachus, saying that it could not be considered freedom of speech. Liberal news outlet El Confidencial published an opinion piece asking Lalachus if she was "aware that your image in the Bells has offended Catholics".

Spanish political party Vox said it would debate Lalachus' actions in the Congress of Deputies, and request an appearance from the Chair of RTVE to explain the controversy.

Author Fernando Savater criticised Lalachus in an article titled Malos propósitos (transl. Bad purposes) written in The Objective, calling Lalachus "Bitelchús", and saying in relation to the controversy "Out with everything that Bitelchús stands for and especially Jordi Évole!". Several criticised Savater, accusing him of fatphobia and sexism, including Maruja Torres.

=== In favour ===
Minister of the Presidency, Justice and Relations with the Cortes, Félix Bolaños, tweeted his support for Lalachus, saying that "freedom of expression and creation must be a fundamental pillar in a democratic society". In addition, the minister announced that the Government will promote the reform of the crime of religious offence this year, framing it in the Action Plan for Democracy, an initiative that seeks to protect fundamental rights such as artistic freedom.

Jordi Évole also supported her, saying that people who criticised her "needed a burning nail to hold on to". Gabriel Rufián took a position in favour, charging against the offended. TV personality Anne Igartiburu commented her support on Lalachus' Instagram profile after the controversy. Journalist Jesús Cintora said, supporting Lalachus, suggesting "if that is the biggest scandal, how is this country doing so that it is more scandalous to take out a print with a drawing of a heifer than to show the tails of hunger or precariousness? What is happening?" He continued that. "They are not really shocked by the image, what is shocking them is that this type of programme (La revuelta) is running that allows another speech or another type of image." Iñaki López was in favor.

Violeta Assiego wrote an article in eldiario.es where she said that it is obviously not a crime. Journalist Raquel Martos posted on X that "I cannot imagine the Jesus Christ that the Bible describes insulting Lalachus with the violence that I read here, nor denouncing her for a picture with a mascot. And really, I always try to empathize with each person's religious feelings, but it is impossible for me to do so". Cayetano Rivera said he does not feel outraged, although he regretted that the "jokes are only one-way".

Carla Berrocal said that "the only thing that matters is the image of your Church. You don't really care about your Church, otherwise as a believer we would be extremely outraged and filing complaints against all the priests who have been groping boys and girls, doing all kinds of atrocities."

== Consequences ==
Belén Esteban said that Lalachus was not feeling bad. Furthermore, she said that "as a Christian, I have not been offended. It did not offend me. What offends me are those Christians who do not represent me at all."

The Grand Prix cow appeared during the Cavalcade of Magi in Madrid on 6 January 2025, and several people joked about the controversy.

Following the controversy, the Government of Spain announced a reform of the Penal Code.

== See also ==
- Freedom of religion in Europe by country
- Religion in Spain
