= Limitless Win =

British television game show

- Title card for the first series
- Genre: Game show
- Presented by: Ant & Dec
- Country of origin: United Kingdom
- Original language: English
- No. of series: 5
- No. of episodes: 30

Production
- Executive producers: Victoria Ashbourne; Stuart Shawcross; Tom Blakeson; Gemma Nightingale
- Producer: Roger Johnson
- Editor: Jamie Rea
- Running time: 45–48 minutes (excluding adverts)
- Production companies: Hello Dolly; Mitre Studios

Original release
- Network: ITV
- Release: 8 January 2022 – present

Ant & Dec's Limitless Win, sometimes known simply as Limitless Win, is a British game show hosted by Ant & Dec. It premiered 8 January 2022 on ITV. It was created and is produced by Hello Dolly Ltd. It is also produced by Ant & Dec's Mitre Studios. The set's AR elements use Unreal Engine 4.

== Gameplay ==
Two contestants work together as a team to answer a series of questions whose solutions are all positive integers (whole numbers). In a preliminary round, they must answer as many questions as possible in 60 seconds, earning five "lives" for each correct response and incurring no penalty for a pass or miss. The contestants alternate turns; no conferring is allowed, and a contestant's turn only ends once they give a correct answer. The hosts decide in advance which contestant will receive the first question. If the team fails to answer any questions correctly, they are immediately dismissed with no winnings; these are normally cut from airings, so this has yet to happen after four series.

Examples of questions used in the preliminary round:

- How many odd numbers are there between zero and one hundred? (Answer: 50)
- The London Eye typically takes how many minutes to complete one full rotation? (Answer: 30)
- Which song about partying was Prince's first UK Top 40 hit? (Answer: "1999")

The main game makes use of the "Limitless Ladder," a vertical scale marked off in steps and displaying cash values at each 10th step that increase from bottom to top. The questions increase in difficulty as the team move up the ladder. They must use a dial to register their guess on each question, attempting to get as close to the correct answer as possible without going over. They move up the ladder a number of steps equal to their guess, and lose enough lives to match the error between the guess and the correct answer. All correct answers in this portion of the game are less than or equal to 50. The hosts warn the team when they have 20 seconds left to give a guess; if they fail to do so before time runs out, the last value they have dialled is automatically locked in. If the team make an error larger than the number of remaining lives or offer a guess above the exact answer, the game ends and they leave with no winnings.

Examples of questions used in the main game:

- On 21 June 2021, the longest day of the year, the Shetland Islands experienced the most hours of daylight in the UK. How many hours was that? (Answer: 19)
- The Natural History Museum's Dippy the Dinosaur, which went on a national tour in 2018, is how many metres long in its displayed pose? (Answer: 26)
- How many countries have a land border with Germany? (Answer: 9)

One lifeline at a time is made available for the team's use as the game proceeds; each may only be used once. The lifelines are shuffled and randomly placed at indicated steps on the Limitless Ladder, but the identity of each one is only revealed once the team reaches it. If the team unlocks a new lifeline while holding an unused one, they may only keep one of the two and must discard the other.

- More Than: The team chooses a value and is then told whether or not the correct answer is higher than it.
- Odd or Even: The team is told whether the correct answer is odd (units digit of 1, 3, 5, 7, or 9) or even (units digit of 2, 4, 6, 8, or 0).
- Range: The team is shown an interval containing the correct answer whose ends differ by 10 (e.g. 14 to 24).
- Take Two: Two guesses are allowed, both given by the team (Series 1) or one each from the team and the hosts (Series 2-). Only the guess closer to the correct answer without going over is counted.

If the team gives an exact guess, they receive five more lives and their bank is increased to match the highest cash value they have reached to that point. They may end the game at any time and keep their banked money, as long as they have not locked in a guess for the current question. The first 12 values displayed on the Limitless Ladder are £500 (the starting point), £1,000, £2,500, £5,000, £10,000, £20,000, £30,000, £50,000, £75,000, £100,000, £150,000, and £250,000. Onwards, every 10 additional steps will increase the prize by a further £250,000. There is seemingly no upper limit to the potential top prize.

If the error between the team's guess and the correct answer is exactly large enough to use up all remaining lives, the game moves into a "sudden death" phase. Any inexact guess on the next question ends the game and sends the team home with no money, while an exact one gives them five lives, banks the last value reached, and returns the team to normal play.

== Notable performances ==
=== Highest amount won ===
Series	Episode	Contestants	Amount won	Original air date
1	1	Will & Kathryn	£500,000	8 January 2022
3	2	Helen & Charlie	£1,000,000	13 January 2024
5	3	Efe & Kevin	£750,000	18 January 2026

=== Highest position on the ladder ===
Series	Episode	Contestants	Position achieved		Money earned	Original air date
Series	Episode	Contestants	Number of steps	Corresponding amount	Money earned	Original air date
2	6	Troy & Tracey-Jane	143 (Note: 143 is the number of steps the couple achieved safely within the £1,000,000 stage, keeping them in the game. Despite proceeding to lock in an answer that crossed the 149th step, that answer was wrong enough to end their game, losing them a bank of £500.)	£1,000,000	£0 (£500 was lost)	4 February 2023
3	2	Helen & Charlie	144	£1,000,000	£1,000,000	13 January 2024
3	6	Paul & Ellie	151	£1,250,000	£75,000	10 February 2024
5	2	Emma & David	142	£1,000,000	£75,000	11 January 2026

== Reception ==
Michael Hogan of The Daily Telegraph felt that Limitless Win was Ant & Dec's first new success after a string of previous "flops" (such as PokerFace, Push the Button, the U.S. Wanna Bet? and Red or Black?), and not having been involved in a new format for a decade. He felt that "the game itself was a little fiddly but swept along in its propulsive momentum, viewers soon got the hang of it", and that the format felt "genuinely groundbreaking" in a "crowded" market for game shows.

Stuart Heritage of The Guardian felt that Limitless Win was essentially Who Wants to Be a Millionaire? with "a few bells and whistles" (such as the idea of a "limitless" prize), and that the show suffered from pacing issues and "gratuitous complications" in its format. However, he praised Ant & Dec's hosting for their "perfectly weighted performance" in conducting the game, easily explaining the rules, and conversing with the contestants, and deemed it to be their "most effective new venture in probably two decades".

=== Viewership ===
The series premiered to over 6.3 million viewers, making it ITV's highest-rated non-scripted series premiere since The Masked Singer. With average viewing figures of 4.7 million, it was the highest rated game show of 2022. The third series opened to 3.8 million viewers.

== Transmissions ==
Series	Start date	End date	Episodes
1	8 January 2022	5 February 2022	5
2	25 December 2022 (Note: The first episode of series two was a Christmas celebrity special. Due to time constraint, the broadcast of one of the games for charity had to be divided in two parts: the game began during a Christmas special and terminated during the first regular episode.)		6
2	7 January 2023	4 February 2023	6
3	6 January 2024	10 February 2024	6
4	4 January 2025	19 January 2025	6
5	27 December 2025		7
5	11 January 2026	15 February 2026	7

A sixth series has been commissioned.

== International versions ==
Banijay Entertainment owns international format rights.

On 1 March 2022, it was reported that Banijay subsidiary Endemol Shine North America was pitching a US version of the series to local networks.

On 22 August 2022, RTL announced that they commissioned a German version of the show, Ohne Limit, to be produced by Endemol Shine Germany.
