= El último show =

Spanish television series

- Genre: Drama; Metafiction
- Created by: Álex Rodrigo
- Screenplay by: Sara Alquézar; Enrique Lojo; Álex Rodrigo
- Directed by: Álex Rodrigo; Carlos Val
- Starring: Miguel Ángel Tirado; Laura Boudet; José Luis Esteban; Luisa Gavasa; Armando del Río; Itziar Miranda; Rubén Martínez; Pablo Lagartos; Denis Cicholewski
- Country of origin: Spain
- Original language: Spanish
- No. of seasons: 1
- No. of episodes: 8

Production
- Running time: 50 min (approx.)
- Production company: Aragón TV

Original release
- Network: Aragón TV
- Release: 20 February – 16 April 2020

El último show (transl. 'The Last Show') is a Spanish television series starring Miguel Ángel Tirado (Marianico el Corto) created by Álex Rodrigo, the first original fiction series produced by Aragón TV. It originally aired in 2020.

== Premise ==
Set in Aragon, the fiction is approached as a tragedy blended with comedy elements. A formerly popular comedian, Miguel Ángel, a.k.a. "Marianico el Corto", suffers from an identity crisis after finding out that his jokes are no longer funny. Despite his manager Chusé's intentions to return him back to stardom, he realises that he has little time left and decides to make a surrealist film paying homage to Luis Buñuel. He also tries to return to his former wife Pilar, now in a relationship with the much younger Dámaso. Miguel Ángel's story runs parallel to the developments in the teenage years of his granddaughter Claudia.

== Cast ==
- Miguel Ángel Tirado, Marianico el Corto as Miguel Ángel, a fictional version of himself.
- Laura Boudet as Claudia, Miguel Ángel's granddaughter.
- Luisa Gavasa as Pilar, Miguel Ángel's former wife.
- Itziar Miranda as Marisa, Pilar and Miguel Ángel's daughter.
- José Luis Esteban as Chusé, Miguél Ángel's manager.
- Pablo Lagartos as Jacinto, Miguel Ángel's biggest fan.
- Denis Cicholewski as Traian, Claudia's classmate.
- Ken Appledorn as Max, English-language teacher.
- Laura Gómez-Lacueva as Laura, an art dealer.
- Armando del Río as Dámaso, Pilar's younger boyfriend.
- María Isabel Díaz as Luz, Marisa's co-worker.
- Rubén Martínez as Fernando, Claudia's father and Marisa's former husband.

With the special collaboration of

- Álvaro Morte as Álvaro Morte.
- José Lifante as Luis Buñuel.
- José María Rubio as Barragán.
- Carlota Callén as Lorena.

== Production and release ==
Created by Álex Rodrigo, El último show was the first original fiction series produced by Aragón TV. It was directed by Rodrigo together with Carlos Val, whereas the screenplay was co-written by Rodrigo himself with Sara Alquézar and Enrique Lojo. Mario López worked as cinematography director. Zaza Ceballos, Álex Rodrigo, Jaime Fontán and Silvia Gómez Jordana were credited as executive producers. Shooting fully took place in Zaragoza during the northern hemisphere Fall of 2019. The series consists of 8 episodes featuring a running time of around 50 minutes.

Originally broadcast by Aragón TV, the series premiered on 20 February 2020 in the Aragon region, earning 116,000 average viewers and a 23.1% audience share in the first episode, leading its time slot. Following its original run, the series has since been aired on HBO España (since 17 April 2021) and other FORTA Spanish regional networks (TV3, Canal Sur, TPA, TV Canarias).

== Awards and nominations ==
Year	Award	Category	Nominee(s)	Result	Ref.
2021?	22nd Iris Awards	Best Screenplay	Álex Rodrigo, Sara Alquézar, Enrique Lojo	Pending	
2021?	22nd Iris Awards	Best Actor	Miguel Ángel Tirado	Pending	
