= Samuel Koch =

German actor

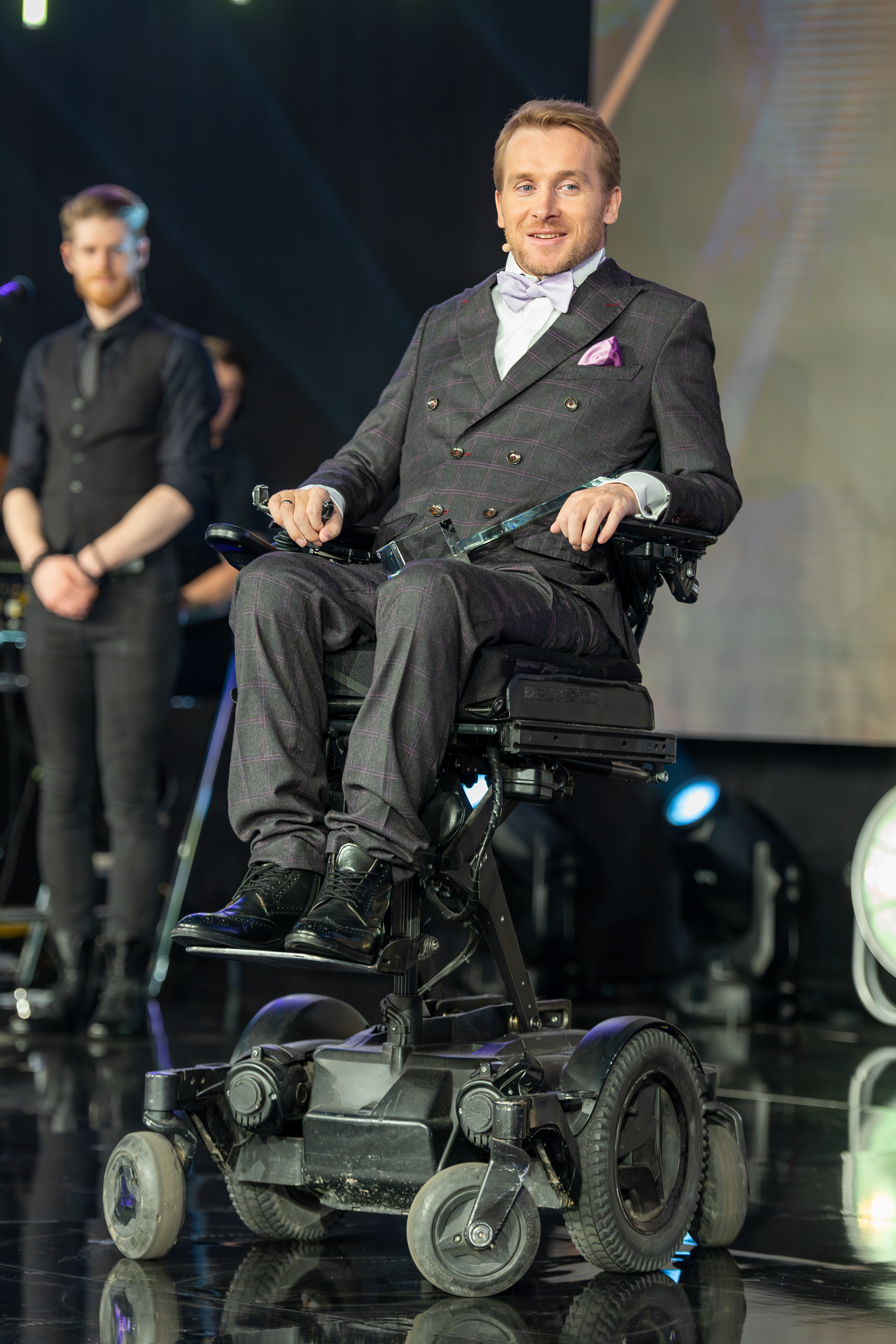
- Koch in 2023
- Born: 28 September 1987 (age 39); Neuwied, Germany
- Occupations: Actor, author
- Years active: 2010–present
- Spouse: Sarah Elena Timpe (m. 2016)

Samuel Koch (born 28 September 1987) is a German actor and former stunt performer. In 2010, during the filming of Wetten, dass..?, he was involved in an incident that resulted in his quadriplegia.

Since then, he has received recognition for his performances in the soap opera Storm of Love (2014) and the drama film Head Full of Honey (2014). He was a third assistant director on the war film 4 Days in May, in which he had a small role. He competed on The Masked Singer Germany in 2021.

== Wetten, dass...? and spinal cord injury ==
On 4 December 2010, Koch was seriously injured during a segment of the entertainment show Wetten, dass..?

He took on a challenge to jump over five moving cars of gradually increasing size using spring-loaded boots. He successfully jumped the first and third car (the second one was aborted), but he failed to clear the fourth car, driven by his own father. Koch's head hit the windshield and he landed on the studio floor, fracturing two cervical vertebrae and damaging his spinal cord.

Koch survived after emergency surgery, but as of 2011 he is permanently paralyzed from the neck down. The episode was suspended and then taken off air about 20 minutes later, for the first time in the program's history. In the following episode, host Thomas Gottschalk announced his resignation, leaving after the last installment of the 2011 season.

== Selected filmography ==
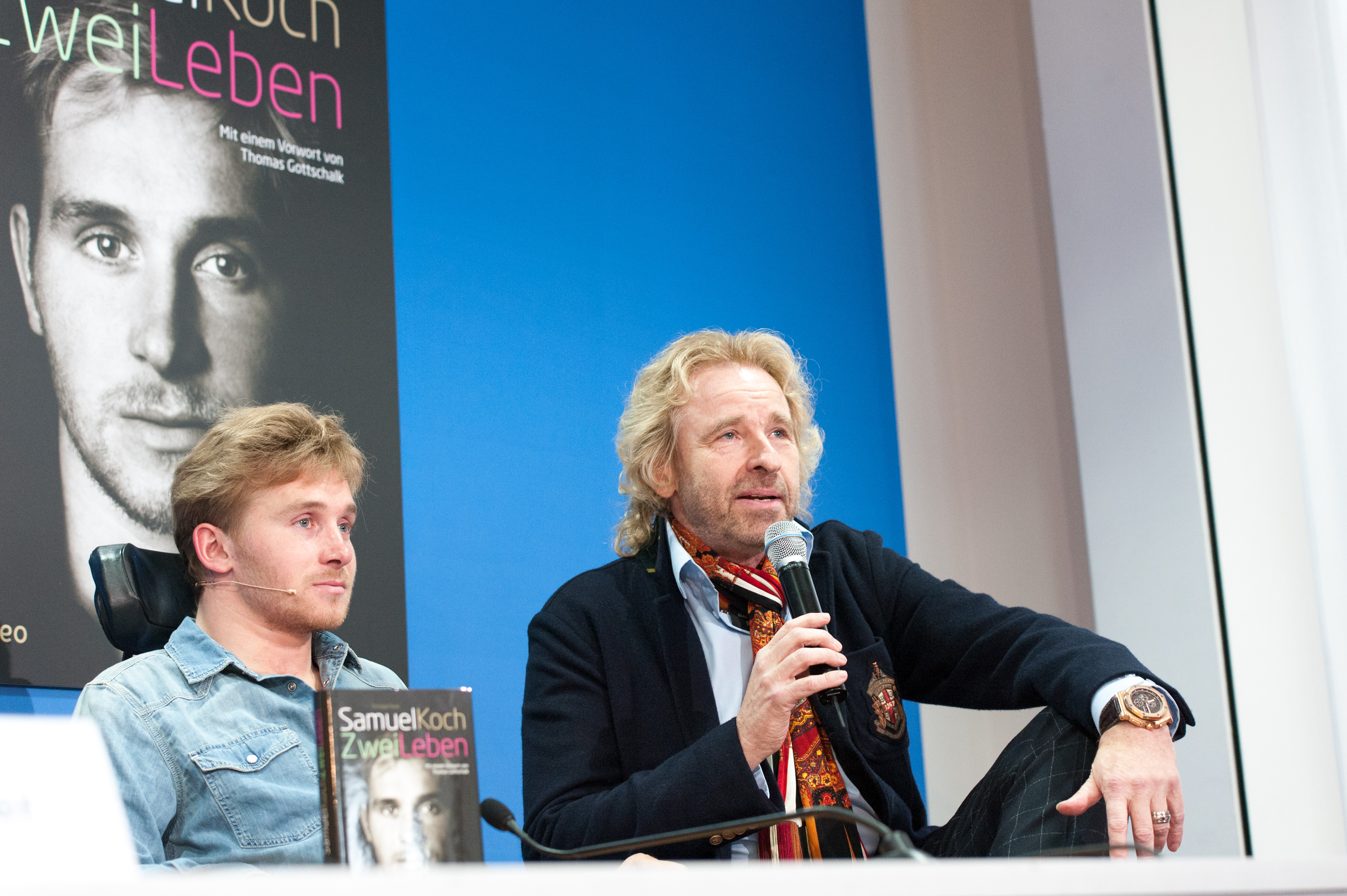
Koch (left) with Thomas Gottschalk who hosted the Wetten, dass..? episode where the incident occurred

- Wetten, dass..? (2010) as himself (Note: Due to his accident during the filming of the series, the episode in which he appears is no longer broadcast.)
- Storm of Love (2014) as Tim Adler (24 episodes)
- Head Full of Honey (2014) as Fahrkartenverkäufer
- 4 Days in May (2018) as soldier and third assistant director
- Draußen in meinem Kopf (2018) as Sven
- The Masked Singer Germany (2021) as Phoenix
- Sachertorte (2022) as Matze

== See also ==
- List of people with quadriplegia
- List of filming accidents in the 2010s
