= Adriana Abenia =

Spanish television presenter, model and actress

- Born: Adriana Abenia Gracia; July 14, 1984 (age 42); Zaragoza, Spain
- Education: University of Zaragoza
- Occupations: Actress, TV presenter, Model

Adriana Abenia Gracia (born 14 July 1984 in Zaragoza, Aragón), is a Spanish television presenter, model and actress.

== Early life and career ==
Abenia began her career as a model in Milan, where she has worked with designers such as Armani and Prada. She has been the image of prestigious cosmetic, distribution and telecommunications companies. She earned a diploma in Tourism from the University of Zaragoza.

In September 2009 she became a regular presenter on Sin ir más lejos for Aragon TV. In 2010, she was signed by Telecinco. In September 2010, she appeared on cover of the Spanish version of the men's magazine FHM, and in June 2011 was voted 63rd sexiest woman in the world, and reached the 50 sexiest women in 2012.

In 2014, Abenia appeared as a celebrity contestant on the popular long-running Spanish game show Pasapalabra and was found to be cheating by the host, Christian Galvez. During one of the segments, which involved naming a tune, Abenia was found to be using her iPhone and the music identifying app Shazam. She openly admitted to breaking the rules but the violation was well received by audiences, who called the episode one of the show's most entertaining.
