= Castilla-La Mancha Media =

Regional public broadcasting service of Castilla–La Mancha, Spain

Ente Público de Radiotelevisión de Castilla-La Mancha
- Company type: Ente público
- Genre: Public broadcasting service
- Founded: 2000
- Headquarters: Toledo, Castilla–La Mancha, Spain
- Area served: Castilla–La Mancha
- Services: Television, radio, online
- Owner: Regional administration

The Ente Público de Radiotelevisión de Castilla-La Mancha (RTVCM), known under the brandname Castilla-La Mancha Media (CMM), is the regional public broadcasting service of Castilla–La Mancha, in Spain. The main headquarters is located in Toledo.

== History ==
The broadcaster was created by means of a Law from 26 May 2000 as a "public law entity with its own legal personality". The law endured modifications in 2001 and 2002. The public entity is a member of FORTA, the federation of Spanish regional broadcasting services.

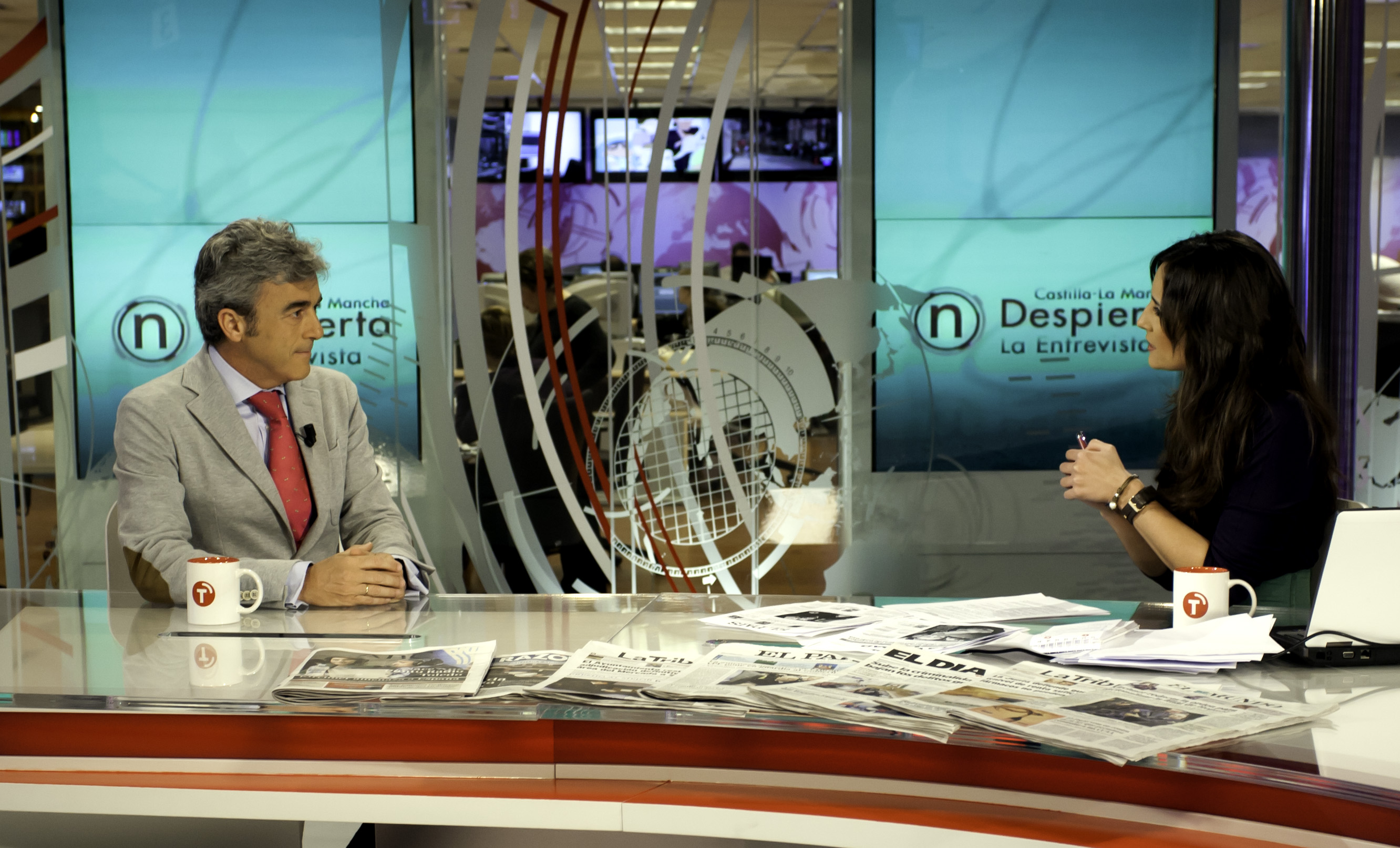
Leandro Esteban interviewed in RTVCM's program Castilla-La Mancha despierta (2012)

Its government institutions consist of a managing board (appointed by the plenary of the Cortes of Castilla–La Mancha, the regional legislature), a Director General (appointed by the regional cabinet) and an advisory council. The latter is formed by members elected by the regional legislature, the regional cabinet, the region's ayuntamientos, the University of Castilla–La Mancha, and by the main trade unions.

On 30 May 2001, the radio station Castilla-La Mancha Radio began to transmit. Some time later, on 13 December 2001, the television channel Castilla-La Mancha Televisión (CMT) began transmissions. A secondary TV channel, CMT2, was inaugurated in 2009. The regional government closed it down in 2011. In 2016, the public entity adopted the brand identity of 'Castilla-La Mancha Media' (CMM), accordingly renaming the brandnames of its radio and television networks.
