= Thomas Gottschalk =

German television host and entertainer

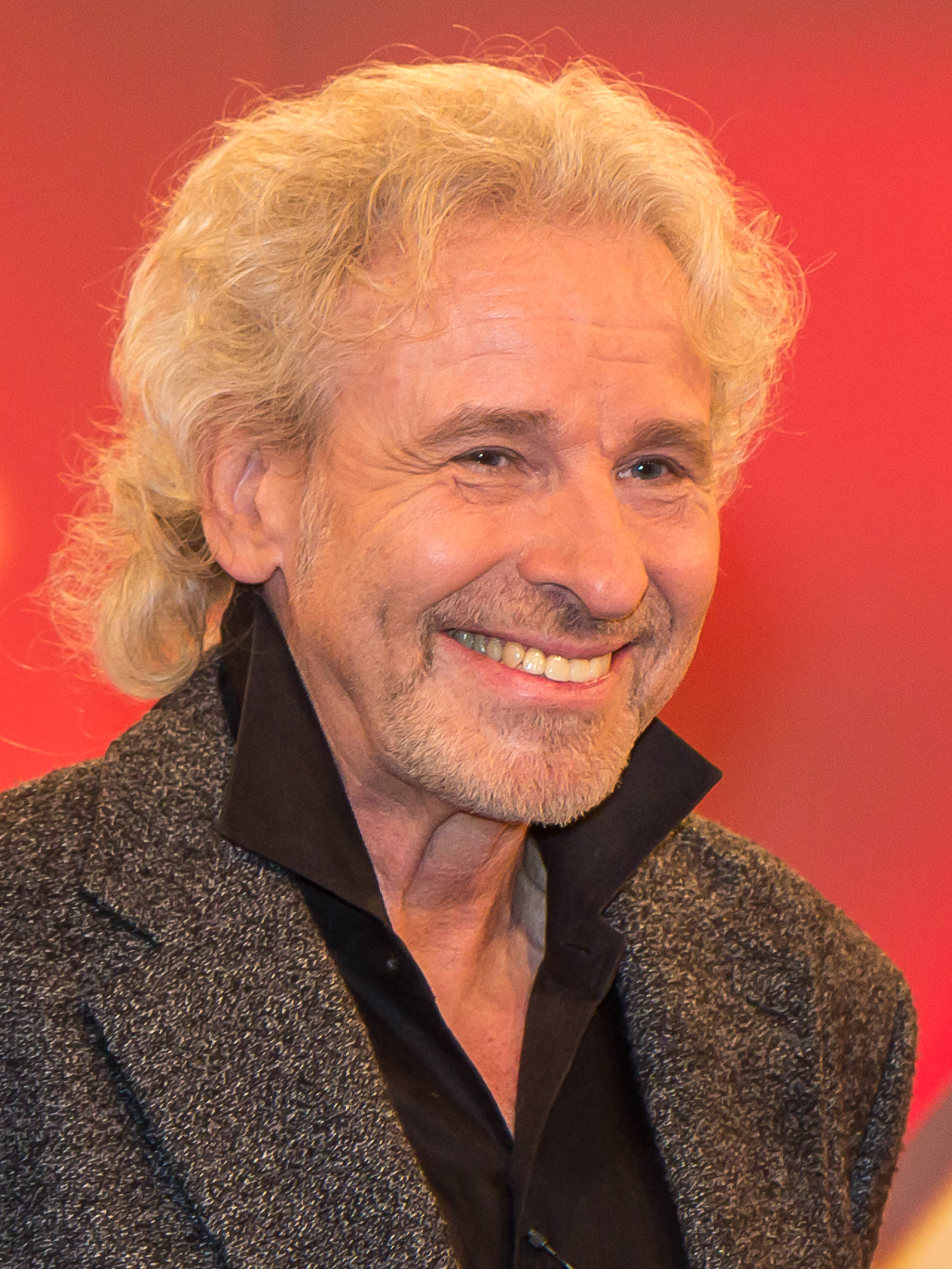
- Gottschalk at the talk show maischberger. die woche in 2018
- Born: Thomas Johannes Gottschalk; 18 May 1950 (age 76); Bamberg, Bavaria, West Germany
- Occupations: Radio and TV host, entertainer, actor
- Years active: 1971–2025
- Spouse(s): Thea Hauer (m. 1976; div. 2024) Karina Mroß (m. 2024)
- Children: 2

Signature
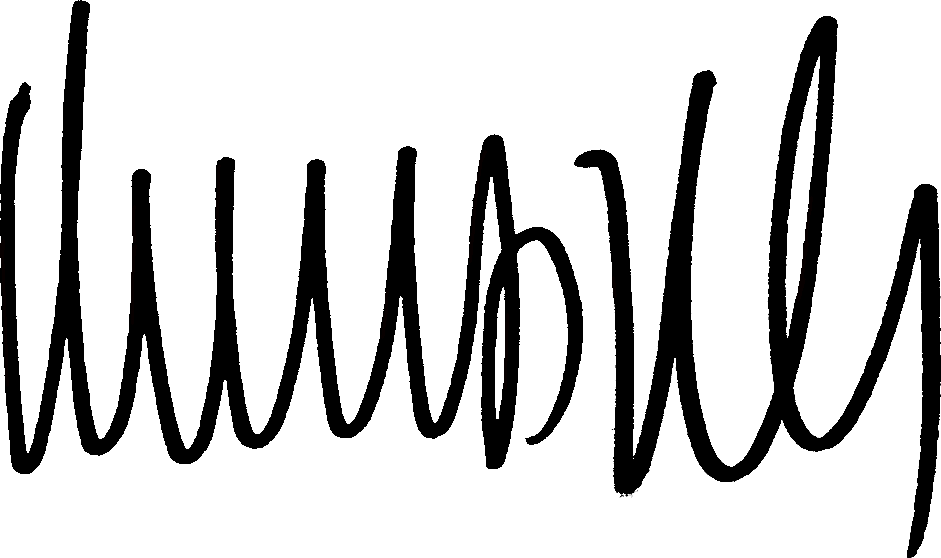

Thomas Johannes Gottschalk (born 18 May 1950 in Bamberg) is a German radio and television host and entertainer. He is best known for hosting Wetten, dass..?, for many years Europe's biggest television show, which he steered to huge success in Germany, Austria, Switzerland and South Tyrol between 1987 and 2023. Until 2015, he was also the brand ambassador in television advertisements for Haribo confectionery.

== Early life ==
Gottschalk was born in Bamberg, Bavaria, the son of a lawyer. After attending the Humanistisches Gymnasium (humanities-oriented high school) in Kulmbach, he studied history and German philology, eventually taking his exams as a teacher for primary and secondary schools; however, it was during this time that he discovered his true vocation: entertainment.

== Career ==
From 1971 on, Gottschalk worked as a freelancer for the youth program of the Bayerischer Rundfunk (Bavarian Broadcasting); in 1973, he became anchor for a news program. In 1976, after a brief detour to the newspaper Münchner Merkur, he became a regular contributor at the Bayerischer Rundfunk, and subsequently gained popularity as the host of the show Pop nach acht. He was awarded the Kurt-Magnus-Preis for his "outstanding talents" as a radio host in 1978.

Starting in 1977, Gottschalk hosted the TV show Telespiele. Initially broadcast on the Bayerischer Rundfunk's television channel, it switched to the national public ARD channel in 1980. In the same year, Gottschalk founded GLS United, the first German hip hop group and performed the first German rap song, "Rapper's Deutsch".

From 1982 to 1987, Gottschalk hosted the show Na sowas on ZDF and was awarded the Goldene Kamera (golden camera) for his performance on that show in 1985. During that period he also starred in several German comedies with actor Mike Krüger. Gottschalk occasionally works as an actor until today, taking roles in the Hollywood movies Trabbi goes to Hollywood (1991) and Zookeeper (2011). In 1993, Gottschalk starred in Sister Act 2: Back in the Habit (1993) as a consequence of leading actress Whoopi Goldberg losing a bet in Gottschalk's gameshow Wetten, dass..?. He plays the sausage-obsessed German cook, Father Wolfgang.

In 1987, Gottschalk replaced Frank Elstner as host of Wetten, dass..?, which he continued until December 2011, with only a brief interruption from 1992 to 1994 when the show was taken over by Wolfgang Lippert. Reportedly, his withdrawal from the show was related to an accident that happened live on Wetten, dass..? on 4 December 2010. A contestant in the show, a young gymnast named Samuel Koch, was paralyzed from the shoulders down after being hit by a car during a stunt where he was to jump over it with spring-loaded boots. Gottschalk was upset this happened and called off the show early for the first time ever when it became apparent that Koch was severely injured. Gottschalk announced his retirement from the show in the next episode.

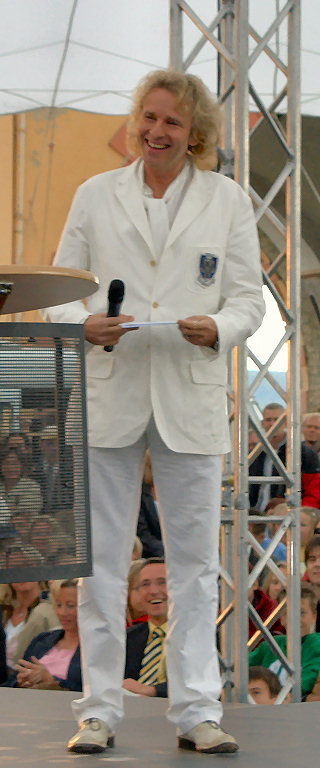
Gottschalk in 2005

From 1992 to 1995, Gottschalk also hosted a late night show on television, Gottschalk Late Night, and while it was not very successful, it is considered a predecessor to such shows such as Die Harald Schmidt Show, TV total and the Johannes B. Kerner Show. Gottschalk Late Night also featured the Model '92 Competition during 1992, in which Heidi Klum was the winner and received a modeling contract and winning prize, paving the way for her modeling career.

Gottschalk has been awarded a number of prizes for his work; apart from those mentioned above. These include the Telestar in 1987, the Goldenes Schlitzohr (golden rascal) and the Goldenes Kabel (golden cable) in 1991, as well as the Goldene Feder ("golden feather") in 2001. He also received a total of three Bambi awards, which he returned in 1988 after a dispute with the publisher Burda. However, in 2001, he was awarded a "Bambi of honor" which he accepted. In 2012 Gottschalk co-hosted the show Das Supertalent.

Gottschalk also co-hosts the German TV show Die 2 – Gottschalk und Jauch gegen alle together with Günther Jauch.

== Personal life ==
Gottschalk married his wife Thea in 1976. He has two sons, Roman and Tristan and one grandson (born 2010). In 2019, he announced that he and Thea would be getting divorced after 43 years of marriage.

On 16 November 2004, Gottschalk bought Castle Marienfels in Remagen, Germany. He lived there from 2006 to 2013. It was announced at the end of January 2013 that he had sold the castle to Frank Asbeck. He has had a second home in Malibu, California, since the beginning of the 1990s. The residence burned down in the 2018 California wildfires.

In 2005, Gottschalk received an entry in the Guinness World Records, having been featured in longest running ad featuring one person; between 1991 and 2015 he regularly appeared in ads for the sweets company Haribo.

On 20 November 2008, he won €1 million for charity in a celebrity version of Wer wird Millionär?, the German version of Who Wants to Be a Millionaire?.

== Filmography ==
=== Film ===
Year	Title	Role	Notes
1978	Summer Night Fever	DJ	
1981	Piratensender Powerplay	Tommy Jürgensen	
1983	Die Supernasen	Tommy Jürgensen / Prince Faruk al Habib	Also co-writer
1984	Zwei Nasen tanken Super	Tommy Jürgensen	Also co-writer
1984	Mama Mia – Don't Panic	Frank Müller	
1985	Big Mäc	Bernhard Maurer	
1985	Die Einsteiger	Tommy Jürgensen	Also co-writer
1985	Seitenstechen	Showmaster	
1987	Three Crazy Jerks (a.k.a. Lovable Zanies)	Richy	Also writer
1988	Three Crazy Jerks II (a.k.a. Lovable Zanies II)	Richy	Also writer, director and composer
1990	Harry and Harriet	Harry	
1990	Think Big	Mr. Roberts	
1991	Keep on Running	Latin teacher	Cameo appearance
1991	Trabbi goes to Hollywood	Gunther Schmidt	
1992	Ring of the Musketeers	Peter Porthos	
1993	Sister Act 2: Back in the Habit	Father Wolfgang	
1999	Late Show	Hannes Engel	
2004	Garfield: The Movie	Garfield (voice)	German dub
2007	Meet the Robinsons	Cornelius Robinson (voice)	German dub
2008	1½ Knights – In Search of the Ravishing Princess Herzelinde	King Gunther	
2011	Zookeeper	Jürgen Mavroc	

== Audiobooks ==
- Herbstblond: Die Autobiographie (Audiobook, Autobiography, read by Thomas Gottschalk), Random House Audio 2015, ISBN 978-3837130768
- Herbstbunt: Wer nur alt wird, aber nicht klüger, ist schön blöd (Audiobook, Autobiography, read by Thomas Gottschalk), Random House Audio 2019, ISBN 978-3837145885

== Awards ==
- Goldener Gong (1983)
- Telestar (1987)
- Deutscher Fernsehpreis Beste Show für Wetten, dass..? (gemeinsam mit Viktor Worms und Alexander Arnz) (1999)
- Bayerischer Fernsehpreis Ehrenpreis des Bayerischen Ministerpräsidenten (1999)
- Rose d'Or Goldene Rose für Game-Show-Moderation für Wetten, dass..? (2005)
