= Wanna Bet? =

- Wanna Bet? logo (ABC version)
- Genre: Game show
- Based on: Wetten, dass..? by Frank Elstner
- Presented by: Mark McEwen and Gordon Elliott (1993); Ant & Dec (2008)
- Announcer: Mark Elliott (1993)
- Country of origin: United States
- Original language: English
- No. of seasons: 1
- No. of episodes: 6

Production
- Running time: 43 minutes (approx.)

Original release
- Network: CBS
- Release: April 21, 1993
- Network: ABC
- Release: July 21 – September 2, 2008

Related
- Germany: Wetten, dass..? UK: You Bet!

Wanna Bet? is an American game show based on the German series Wetten, dass..?, which aired on ABC in 2008. It featured four celebrities making wagers on whether ordinary Americans will be able to complete outrageous stunts. The format first aired as a one-time special on CBS in 1993, with Gordon Elliott and Mark McEwen hosting.

== History ==
The CBS version was a one-time special aired on April 21, 1993 with Gordon Elliott and Mark McEwen hosting, and Mark Elliott as announcer. Marsha Warfield, Martin Mull, Victoria Jackson, and Evander Holyfield were the panelists.

An episode of the ABC version began with four celebrities being given $25,000 to wager on the success or failure of ordinary Americans completing outrageous stunts. Show hosts Ant & Dec introduced a stunt performer and the stunt they claim they will be able to complete, and the celebrities then guess whether the performer will successfully complete the stunt or if they will fail to complete the stunt. The celebrities also lock in the amount of money they'd like to wager on performer's ability to complete the stunt, but the exact amount of the wager is not revealed to the viewing audience. The performer then attempts the stunt, and afterward the celebrities' wagers are revealed, which are added to their money if their bet won or deducted from if their bet lost. If the celebrity's money fell to $0 after losing an all-in bet, they cannot participate in any later bets for the episode. The celebrity with the most money totalled at the end of an episode wins that amount for their favorite charity.

Due to poor ratings, the show was cancelled after one season.

== Differences with the original show ==
Wanna Bet? was based on the German entertainment show Wetten, dass..? which is shown in Austria, Switzerland, Italy and Germany. The show in Europe normally lasts up to 120 to 150 minutes and is broadcast an average 6 times a year. The first show started in 1981. After every show viewers can call for their favourite bet wager and they can win 1000, 2000, 3000, 4000 or 5000 Euros by becoming the bet king. In the show included is a child bet, where a child can bet a difficult task and is awarded outside the competition. The child normally gets an extraordinary present (training with the soccer national team and visit a game of the team, or visit a concert music performance of famous musician). The show is also broadcast from different locations around Europe (Xanten, Disneyland Paris, Palma de Mallorca, Vienna, Berlin, Berne, and other locations in mainly German-speaking areas).

== Episode results ==
The Winners

=== Episode 1: 21 July 2008 ===
Guest star	Final Total
Harland Williams	$6,607
Sherri Shepherd	$60,500
George Takei	$106,150
Tom Green	$77,500

=== Episode 2: 28 July 2008 ===
Guest star	Final Total
Tom Bergeron	$6,000
Melissa Peterman	$4,000
Corbin Bernsen	$35,511
Richard "Rip" Hamilton	$0

=== Episode 3: 4 August 2008 ===
Guest star	Final Total
Drew Lachey	$1
Rondell Sheridan	$0
Melissa Peterman	$43,000
Jerry Rice	$38,000

=== Episode 4: 12 August 2008 ===
Guest star	Final Total
Tom Green	$0
Shawne Merriman	$79,997
Ali Landry	$0
Larry Joe Campbell	$76,000

=== Episode 5: 26 August 2008 ===
Guest star	Final Total
Bill Engvall	$44,000
Stuart Scott	$3,500
Scott Hamilton	$31,000
Sherri Shepherd	$9,999

=== Episode 6: 2 September 2008 ===
Guest star	Final Total
George Wendt	$0
Shandi Finnessey	$0
Tom Green	$0
Mo'Nique	$6,200

== Variations ==
- Originally, the show was supposed to use the panel of contestants hoping to win money for many things but wanted ordinary people do extraordinary things to impress the panel of celebrities.
- Throughout the series, there were 4 stunts for each show. In episode 4, there were 5 stunts.
- In episodes 1-3 and 5-6, the panel of celebrities tell the hosts their predictions before each stunt and their wagers after each stunt. In episode 4, they tell the hosts their wagers before each stunt and showed their predictions after each stunt.
- In episodes 1-4, after the final stunt, the panel of celebrities showed their wagers first and their predictions. In episode 5-6, they showed their predictions first and then their wagers.
- Episode 4 did not show a stunt outside the studio.
- Episodes 1-3 was shown on Mondays from July 21 to August 4 and Episodes 4-6 were shown on Tuesday from August 12 to September 2. After Episode 4, the show was put on hiatus for one week.
- Episode 1 was shown as a rerun for August 19 for unexplained reasons.
- Throughout the entire series, the announcer announced a promotion at abc.com. In episode 5, it was told by Ant and Dec.

== Ratings ==
The series declined in the Nielsen ratings, first on Mondays, then on Tuesdays, usually losing to repeats of sitcoms, NCIS and Big Brother 10 on CBS, reruns of House on Fox, America's Got Talent on NBC (also including their 2008 Summer Olympics coverage) and the Spanish-language telenovela Fuego en la sangre on Univision. The first three shows were scheduled after High School Musical: Get in the Picture on July 21 and 28 as well as August 4 before moving to Tuesdays as of August 12.
