= Ramón García (TV host) =

Spanish radio and television presenter (born 1961)

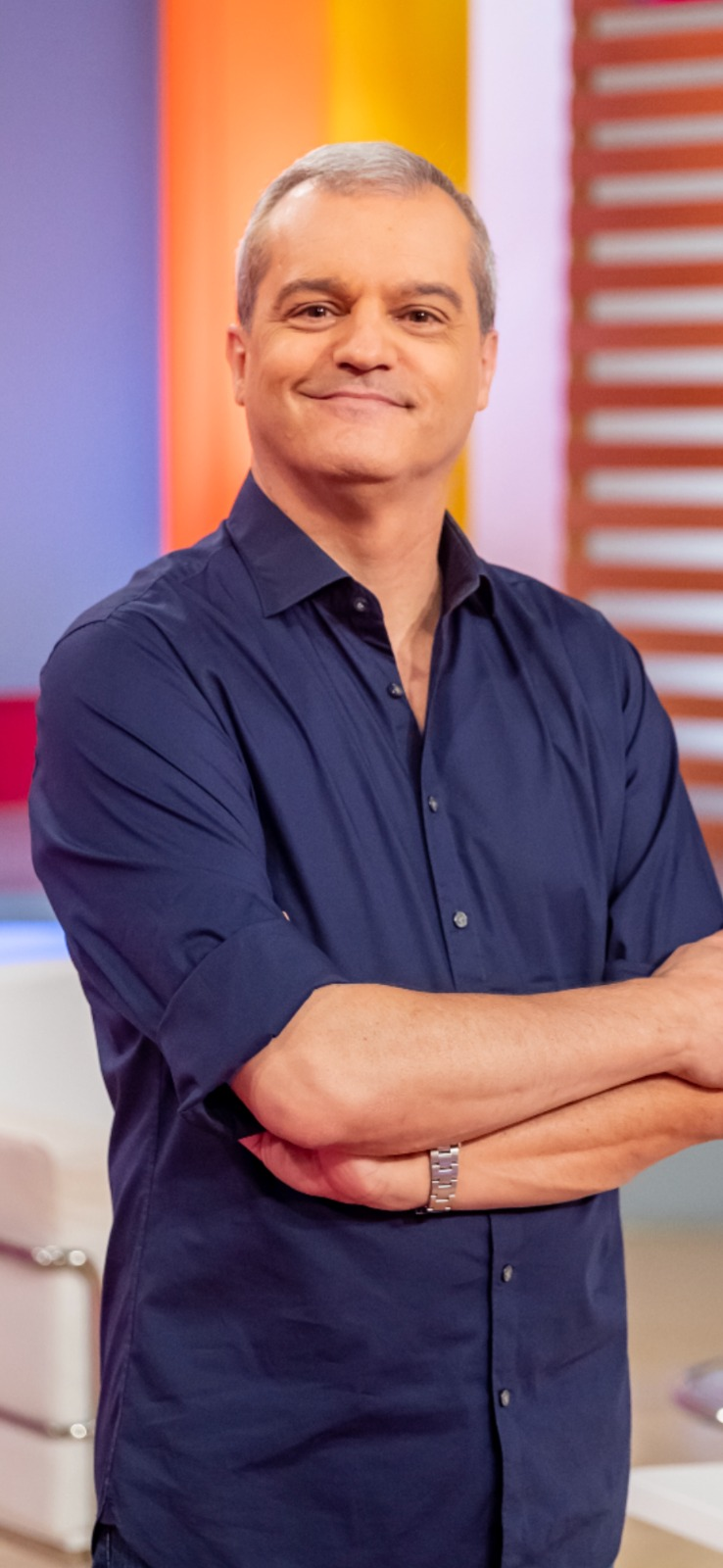
- Ramón García in 2022
- Born: Ramón García Hernando; 28 November 1961 (age 64); Bilbao (Biscay), Spain

Ramón García Hernando (28 November 1961, Bilbao, Spain) is a Spanish radio and television presenter. He is also colloquially known as Ramontxu or Ramonchu. (Note: Ramontxu or Ramonchu in euskera is a colloquial form of calling a person named "Ramón".) His long professional career and his versatility have been demonstrated in television shows like ¿Qué apostamos? and El Grand Prix del verano, and in nineteen live broadcasts of the New Year's Eve clock bell strikes.

== Professional career ==
His career began in the radio, after entering a DJ contest in Biscay in 1983 and being proclaimed the winner by the Cadena SER managers. As a result, he worked for Los 40 Principales and Radio Euskadi. He then jumped into the regional television scene in 1989, having different roles in ETB 2. In 1990 he debuted on national television, on Antena 3 hosting La ruleta de la fortuna.

In 1991 he signed for Televisión Española (TVE) to host No te rías, que es peor, which began a long career on the network with prime time hits such as ¿Qué apostamos? or El Grand Prix del verano. He also hosted on TVE the broadcast of the New Year's Eve clock bell strikes live from Puerta del Sol in Madrid eleven times during this time. (Note: He hosted the welcome on TVE of 1996 –along with Ana Obregón–, 1998 –with Raffaella Carrà–, 1999 –with Carmen Maura–, 2000 –with Nuria Roca–, 2001 –with Paloma Lago–, 2002 –with Paloma Lago–, 2003 –with Paloma Lago and Ricardo Gómez–, 2004 –with Carmen Sevilla–, 2005 –with Ana Obregón–, 2006 –with Anne Igartiburu–, and 2007 –with Anne Igartiburu–.)

In 2007, after fifteen years working for TVE, he signed for Antena 3 to host the Spanish version of Are you smarter than a 5th grader?. The announcement of his presence on the broadcast of the New Year's Eve clock bell strikes on Antena 3 the two following years was a nationwide shock in Spain, as his role on TVE was seen as a Christmas tradition. (Note: He hosted the welcome on Antena 3 of 2008 –along with Anabel Alonso–, and 2009 –with Kira Miró–.)

In 2012 he returned to TVE to host new shows and where he hosted another four times the New Year's Eve clock bell strikes. (Note: He hosted the welcome on TVE of 2015, 2016, 2018 –all along with Anne Igartiburu–, and 2024 –with Ana Mena and Jenni Hermoso–.) Since 2016, he has been hosting an afternoon regional magazine on Castilla-La Mancha Televisión. In 2023, he hosted on TVE the revival of El Grand Prix del verano, eighteen years after his previous season.

As of 2024, he has hosted nineteen live broadcasts of the New Year's Eve clock bell strikes in total: fifteen on TVE, two on Antena 3, and two on Twitch. (Note: He hosted the welcome on Twitch of 2022 –along with Ibai Llanos–, and 2023 –with Ibai Llanos and Anne Igartiburu–.) He has also won several awards in Spain, including a lifetime achievement TP de Oro (2001), an Antena de Oro (2002), and an Iris Awards (2017). He was also nominated to six TP de Oro awards for best presenter (1995–1999 and 2003).

== Television ==
Date	Title	Network	Notes
1989	Tal para cual	Euskal Telebista	
1990	La ruleta de la fortuna	Antena 3	Spanish version of Wheel of Fortune
1991–1994	No te rías, que es peor	Televisión Española	
1992	Ahora o nunca	Televisión Española	
1993–2000	¿Qué apostamos?	Televisión Española	Spanish version of Wetten, dass..?
1994–1995	Esto es espectáculo	Televisión Española	
1995–2005	El Grand Prix del verano	Televisión Española	
1998	La llamada de la suerte	Televisión Española	
1998–2000	Peque Prix	Televisión Española	Co-host, as Professor García
1999	Todo en familia	Televisión Española	
2002	El gladiador	Televisión Española	
2003–2004	Un domingo cualquiera	Televisión Española	
2007	¿Sabes más que un niño de primaria?	Antena 3	Spanish version of Are you smarter than a 5th grader?
2012	¿Conoces España?	Televisión Española	
2016–	En compañía	Castilla-La Mancha Televisión	
2023	El Grand Prix del verano	Televisión Española	
