= No te rías, que es peor =

- Country of origin: Spain
- Original language: Spanish

Production
- Running time: 30 minutes
- Production company: Televisión Española

Original release
- Release: 1990 – 1995

No te rías, que es peor (Spanish: Don't laugh, that's worse) is a Spanish game show broadcast from 1990 to 1995 on La 1 from 14:30 to 15:00 Monday to Friday. It was produced by Josep María Mainat and Toni Cruz.

== Mechanic ==
There were two contestants competing. The first test consisted on them facing the jokes of several comedians. Every time any of the contestants laughed they were deducted points (or, in later seasons, granted less points). Other test consisted in the contestants trying to make laugh each other. They were also faced with an occult panel in which they had to make pairs (at first, in the panels there were Spanish comic characters and later the faces of the comedians) in a limited time. The maximum prize there was 350.000 pesetas (2.100 €).

The contestant who earned more points had to face again the comedians and stand still and serious in order to not lose points. In the final test, the contestant had to select as many boxes from an occult panel as points he had. The contestant would win any object appearing twice in the panel. The prizes went from a plunger to a car.

== Hosts ==
There were 4 hosts at different moments

- Jordi Estadella (October 1, 1990 - June 28, 1991)
- Ramón García (September 23, 1991 - September 9, 1993).
- Miguel Ortiz (September 27, 1993 - September 23, 1994).
- Miriam Díaz-Aroca (September 26, 1994 - June 9, 1995).

In 1996 channel Telecinco made a remake of the program titled Sonría, por favor and hosted by Elsa Anka.

== Comedians ==
Out of the many comedians who appeared on the show the most notable were

- Señor Barragán
- Marianico el Corto
- Manolo de Vega
- Emilio Laguna
- Pedro Reyes
- Paco Aguilar
