= Mónica Martínez =

- Born: Mónica Martínez Pascual; 16 April 1975 (age 51); Madrid, Spain
- Education: Charles III University of Madrid; Complutense University of Madrid
- Occupations: Journalist; Model; Television presenter
- Years active: 1990–present
- Children: 2

Mónica Martínez Pascual (born 16 April 1975) is a Spanish journalist, model and television presenter. She began her television career presenting the La quinta marcha youth programme at the age of 15, and has presented television programmes on the Antena 3, Cuatro, Intereconomía TV, Real Madrid TV, RTVE and Telecinco networks in Spain. Martínez was the sports broadcaster on the Antena 3 Noticias news bulletin Antena 3 Noticias 2 from September 2009 to February 2010, as well as presenting both seasons of the reality television programme Adam and Eve in 2014 and 2015.

== Early life and education ==
On 16 April 1975, Martínez was born in Madrid. She is a graduate of the Charles III University of Madrid with a degree in Journalism and obtained a degree in Audiovisual Communication from the Complutense University of Madrid.

== Career ==
When she was 15 years old, Martínez began her television career. She was the presenter of the Telecinco youth programme La quinta marcha after agreeing a contract with the network. Martínez also did modelling in Osaka and Tokyo, both in Japan, and she wrote about her experiences of the catwalk in the book El revés de la moda. La aventura de una modelo en Japón. She also presented Telecupón in 1999 on Telecinco. In 2000, she presented the seventh season of the Televisión Española (TVE) show ¿Qué apostamos? alongside Ramón García after she made the switch to the television network.

In 2001, Martínez moved to the Antena 3 network and remained there until 2011 where she intermittently presented programmes for the station. For the 2001/02 season, she co-presented the music programme El show de los récords alongside Mar Saura and Manu Carreño. Martínez co-presented the Hoy es tu Día contest with Alonso Caparrós on the same network as well as the special programmes La Noche Más Wapa/Sexy de la Publicidad with Saura and El Gran Test alongside Carreño. During the 2003/04 television season, she and Jaime Cantizano co-presented Diario de una Boda, which focused on the preparation of the royal wedding of the future King Felipe VI and Letizia Ortiz. In 2004, Martínez signed to join the nightly broadcast team as editor and presenter at Real Madrid TV. She remained at the channel for one-and-a-half years before she returned to Antena 3. From July 2006 onwards, Martínez co-presented with Carlos Sobera El Gran Test de la Conducción which features participants being tested on their knowledge of road safety and rules.

She was briefly the presenter of the talk show El Diario de Verano in mid-2006 when regular presenter Patricia Gaztañaga was absent. Martínez also presented the specials Vídeos por un Tubo, Ataka2, Una de Chistes and Locos por la Tele. She was the leader of the New Year's Eve chime ceremony at Puerta del Sol 2006. Martínez reportedly applied to be on the broadcast of The EuroMillions Game but was unsuccessful. She went on to present the sports programme Territorio Champions with Manu Sánchez Fernández and after a year of presenting matches was moved to hosting the special midnight programme that broadcast highlights of matches. In 2008, Martínez co-presented En esta noche with Antonio Hidalgo on the regional channel 7 Televisión Región de Murcia in Murcia.

From June to August 2009, she co-presented the social interest programme Tal cual verano on Antena 3, alongside Juan Luis Alonso in place of Cristina Lasvignes. Martínez made her debut on Antena 3 Noticias, reading the sports news Antena 3 Noticias 2 with Matías Prats Luque on 1 September 2009. She remained on the programme until February 2010. At the conclusion of 2011, Martínez became director of the international online wedding magazine Zankyou as well as writing for the Huffington Post and Muchoviaje.com.

In September 2013, she signed to join the Intereconomía TV network as the reader of the sports news on the 3:00 edition of El Telediario de Intereconomía and the 8:30 bulletin of Telediario de la noche. Martínez presented each of the two seasons of the Cuatro reality television programme Adam and Eve in 2014 and 2015. She was offered the role to present Adán y Eva and liked the idea of the programme as it appeared "daring to me that we could put a format like this in prime time and without pixelating". Martínez went on to present the late night debate programme Pecadores on Cuatro in September 2015 after Televisión Española unsuccessfully attempted to sign her to present the evening television programme Cuestión de tiempo on La 1.

She launched Runner's World Woman magazine for female runners in April 2016. Martínez became a presenter of the Telenico programme Hable con ellas in June 2016 and began her role the following month. She began presenting the Be Mad programme Mujeres runners in March 2017. In February 2019, Martínez signed to become a collaborator on the Cuatro programme Cuatro al día. She is the author of the book Metodo Suéltate for Alienta Editorial, which gives advice on public speaking, and also provides the Método Suéltate: Pierde el miedo y habla en público o a cámara con naturalidad course which is aimed at students studying journalism.

In September 2024, she premiered the program Aquí se hace on Telemadrid, and it was announced that she would host the New Year's Eve countdown (Campanadas) from the Puerta del Sol for the regional network alongside Miguel Lago.

She balances her television work with her role as a coach and mentor for communicators, for which she studied Neuro-linguistic programming and created the "Método suéltate" (Let go method). This is also the title of the book she wrote in 2021, which offers advice on public speaking and appearing natural in front of cameras.

== Personal life ==
Since 2009, she has been married to the sports journalist Fernando Timón who worked for Telemadrid and RTVE. They have two children.
