= Wolfgang Lippert (actor) =

German entertainer, singer, and actor (born 1952)

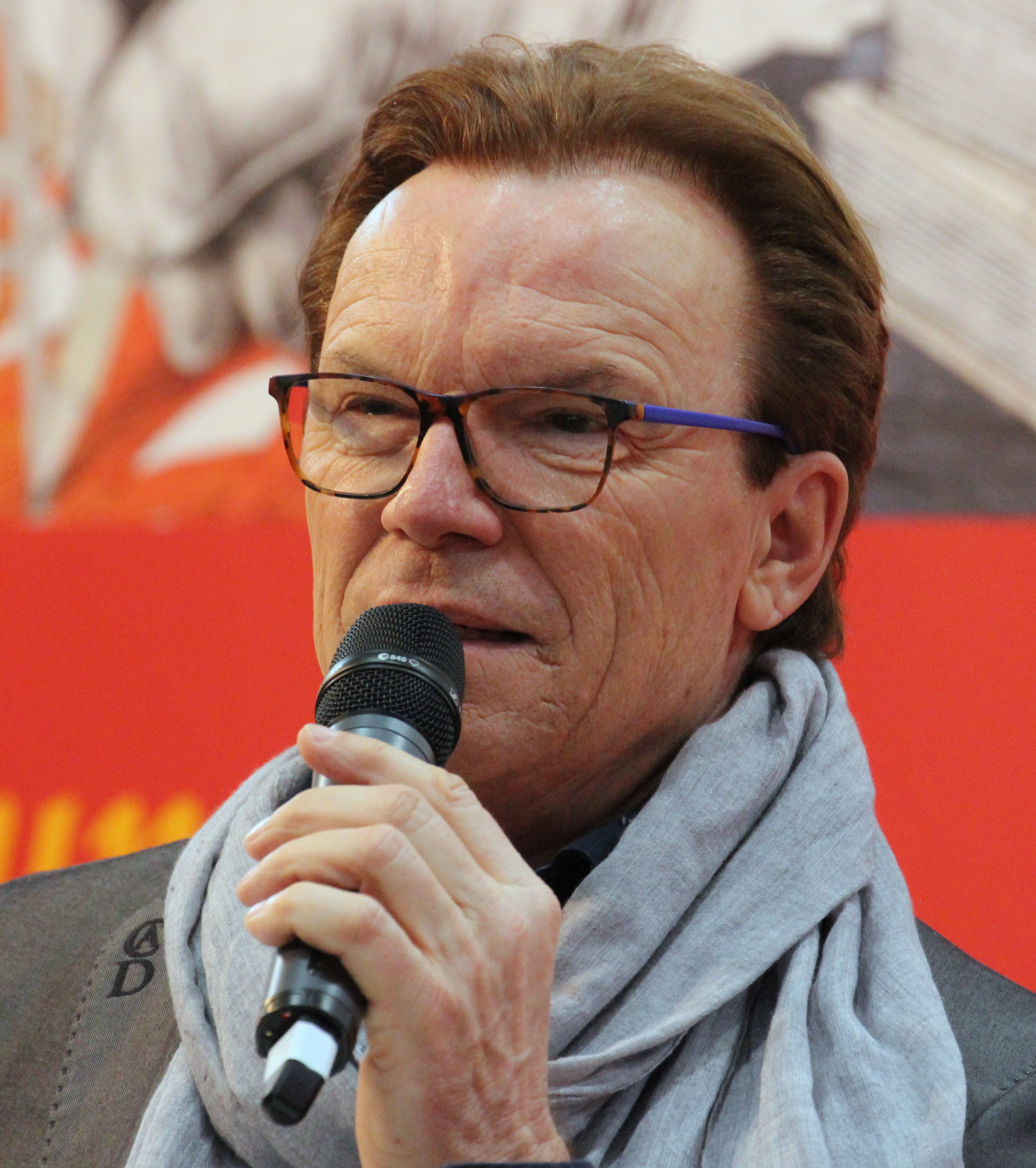
Lippert in 2016

Wolfgang Lippert (born 16 February 1952) is a German entertainer, singer, and actor. He was one of the most popular entertainers of the GDR (East Germany). After working as an auto mechanic and photographer, he came into the show business as a TV show host and singer.

== Biography ==
Lippert was born in Berlin, the son of a Kapellmeister. From 1969 to 1979, he completed piano and singing training at the Berlin-Friedrichshain school of music. Afterwards, he was on tour with his own rock music band and sang also for broadcast productions. With his band he was also once guest in the child broadcast production "Hey Du". The director was inspired by Lippert's way of working with the children and offered him a job moderating the broadcast production.

Lippert accepted the offer and from 1983 to 1986 was the moderator of the monthly program. In 1982, he landed a hit with "Erna kommt" and became famous overnight in the entire GDR. Afterwards followed mostly hits, among other things "Tutti Paletti".

In 1984, Lippert on East German television got its first evening-filling TV show with the title Meine erste Show (my first show). Whereupon, evening shows followed such as Glück muß man haben (a quiz show; 1988–1997) and Ein Kessel Buntes (the most famous Saturday night TV show on East German television; 1988). After the Berlin Wall fell in 1989, Lippert was elected as the "television favourite of the year". With the television show Stimmt's at Radio Bremen he was the first moderator from East Germany, who moderated its own show on West German television.

On 26 September 1992, he became successor to Thomas Gottschalk with Wetten, dass..?, the most popular German Saturday night show by the ZDF. After only nine shows, however, he had to leave the show. Apart from Wetten, dass..?, Lippert has also moderated other shows, such as Der Große Preis (most famous quiz show on German television in those days; 1991), where he substituted for Wim Thoelke, or the talk show 3 nach 9 by Radio Bremen.

From 1997 to 1999, he hosted the ZDF television show Wintergarten.

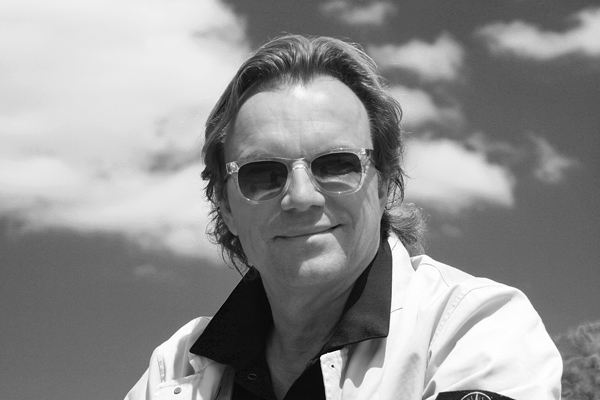
Lippert in 2008

In 2001, Lippert was an actor in the ZDF serial production Wilder Kaiser and sat on the jury of the Miss Germany election. Since 2000, he has been seen as a singer and an actor in the open air show/play Störtebeker Festspiele on the isle of Rügen.

In 2002, Lippert was asked by the German Parliament to develop a TV series Politibongo for the children's channel of ARD and ZDF. Since January 2006, he has been on tour through Germany alongside the East German play legend Herbert Köfer in the Boulevard play Der Liebesfall.
