= Castilla–La Mancha TV 2 =

Castilla-La Mancha TV 2
- Country: Spain
- Broadcast area: Castile–La Mancha
- Headquarters: Albacete

Ownership
- Owner: Ente Público de Radiotelevisión de Castilla-La Mancha

History
- Launched: 9 February 2009
- Closed: 15 December 2011

Links
- Website: www.rtvcm.es

Availability

Terrestrial
- Digital: Mux 63 (Albacete)

Castilla–La Mancha Televisión 2 (CMT2) was a Spanish television channel, launched in 2009. It was founded and began broadcasting in 2009 in Spanish. It closed in 2011.
