= El Grand Prix del verano =

Spanish television show

- Logo since season 15 (2023)
- Genre: Game show
- Created by: Francesco Bosserman
- Presented by: Ramón García; Bertín Osborne
- Country of origin: Spain
- No. of seasons: 18
- No. of episodes: 202

Production
- Running time: 120–130 min approx

Original release
- Network: La Primera
- Release: 17 July 1995 – 11 September 2005
- Network: FORTA channels
- Release: June 2007 – September 2009
- Network: La 1
- Release: 24 July 2023 – 2 September 2026
- Network: Prime Video
- Release: 8 July – 26 August 2025

El Grand Prix del verano (transl. The Grand Prix of the summer) is a Spanish prime-time television summer competition between small towns created by Francesco Boserman and produced by Europroducciones. It was broadcast on La 1 of Televisión Española (TVE) nationwide for eleven seasons from 1995 to 2005, and on some regional broadcasters of the Federation of Regional Organizations of Radio and Television (FORTA) in their respective regions for three seasons from 2007 to 2009. In summer 2023, TVE resumed the program for one more season, and, due to the good reception, confirmed it successively for the summers of 2024, 2025, and 2026.

With the same premise as French television show Intervilles, it features mixed teams representing small towns in Spain competing in a series of games –usually funny physical games played in outlandish costumes, though none-the-less technically difficult, but also general knowledge games where mayors and celebrity godparents are put to the test–, some of which involve live heifers (referred to as the vaquillas). (Note: Season 1 was titled Cuando calienta el sol (transl. When the sun heats) and features four teams in each episode. Starting with season 2, it was renamed El Grand Prix del verano and features two teams in each episode.) Due to the animal welfare law coming into force in 2023, for season 15 the vaquillas were replaced by an anthropomorphic heifer portrayed by a person in a full-body costume who hindered a team at the request of the opposing team.

The show had a version for children, Peque Prix, a competition between schools that aired on TVE for six seasons between 1998 and 2000 and a special aired on Canal 9 and Telemadrid in 2007. It also had a version for Portugal, Todos Gostam do Verão (transl. Everyone likes summer), which featured Portuguese towns, was filmed in the same studio with the same sets of the Spanish version, and was broadcast for one season on SIC in summer 2009.

On 31 December 2024, a controversy concerning the Grand Prix heifer occurred, when Spanish actress and comic Laura Yustres showed during La 1 emissions of New Year's Eve a picture of the cattle imitating the Sacred Heart.

== Hosts ==
Hosts	Seasons																	
Hosts	1	2	3	4	5	6	7	8	9	10	11	12	13	14	15	16	17	18
Ramón García	Host														Host			
Bertín Osborne												Host						

== Episodes ==
Season	Episodes	Originally released			Avg. viewers (millions)	Avg. share	Winning town
Season	Episodes	First released	Last released	Network	Avg. viewers (millions)	Avg. share	Winning town
1	10	17 July 1995	18 September 1995	La Primera	3.160	27.0%	Cudillero
2	13	21 June 1996	13 September 1996	La Primera	3.877	36.6%	Guijuelo
3	13	27 June 1997	19 September 1997	La Primera	3.160	33.4%	Murchante
4	13	1 July 1998	25 September 1998	La Primera	3.025	27.7%	Tordera
5	13	5 July 1999	27 September 1999	La Primera	2.874	27.0%	El Bonillo
6	11	10 July 2000	21 September 2000	La Primera	2.811	24.5%	Suances
7	13	25 June 2001	17 September 2001	La Primera	2.837	24.7%	Nuevo Baztán
8	8	15 July 2002	2 September 2002	La Primera	3.258	30.1%	Griñón
9	10	25 June 2003	3 September 2003	La Primera	2.875	27.2%	Los Molinos
10	8	16 July 2004	30 August 2004	La Primera	2.575	23.3%	Falces
11	13	15 June 2005	11 September 2005	La Primera	2.205	19.2%	Carrión de los Condes
12	14	June–November 2007		FORTA	0.604	12.0%	Ricote
13	13	June–September 2008		FORTA	0.760	13.0%	Ador
14	13	June–September 2009		FORTA	0.758	9.8%	Renedo de Esgueva
15	7	24 July 2023	4 September 2023	La 1	1.691	19.2%	Alfacar
16	10	8 July 2024	6 September 2024	La 1	1.092	12.2%	Olvera
(Note: El Grand Prix de la Navidad (Christmas specials).)	3	23 December 2024	3 January 2025	La 1	0.712	8.0%	Aguilar de Campoo
17	8	7 July 2025	25 August 2025	La 1	0.918	12.4%	San Sebastián de La Gomera
18	9	13 July 2026	2 September 2026	La 1	0.999	12.7%	Quintanar del Rey

== Accolades ==
=== Tp de Oro ===
Year	Category	Recipient	Result	Ref.
1995	Best Presenter	Ramón García (Note: For his work in ¿Qué apostamos?, El Grand Prix del verano, and Aquí jugamos todos.)	Nominated	
1996	Best Presenter	Ramón García (Note: For his work in ¿Qué apostamos? and El Grand Prix del verano.)	Nominated	
1997	Best Presenter	Ramón García	Nominated	
1998	Best Presenter	Ramón García (Note: For his work in ¿Qué apostamos?, El Grand Prix del verano, and La llamada de la suerte.)	Nominated	
1999	Best Presenter	Ramón García (Note: For his work in El Grand Prix del verano, El gran concurso del siglo, and Todo en familia.)	Nominated	
2003	Best Presenter	Ramón García (Note: For his work in El Grand Prix del verano and Un domingo cualquiera.)	Nominated	

=== ATV Awards ===
Year	Category	Recipient	Result	Ref.
1999	Entertainment: varieties and game shows		Nominated	
2024	Best Show (Entertainment)		Nominated	
2024	Best Presenter (Entertainment)	Ramón García	Nominated	
2024	Best Direction (TV Shows)	Gabriela Ventura	Nominated	
2024	Best Camera Direction	Valerio Boserman	Nominated	
2024	Best Screenplay (Entertainment)	Javier Pilar / Carlos Soria	Nominated	
2024	Best Production (Entertainment)	Patricia de Orive / Engel Serón / Cristina Benavente	Nominated	
