= Frank Elstner =

German television presenter

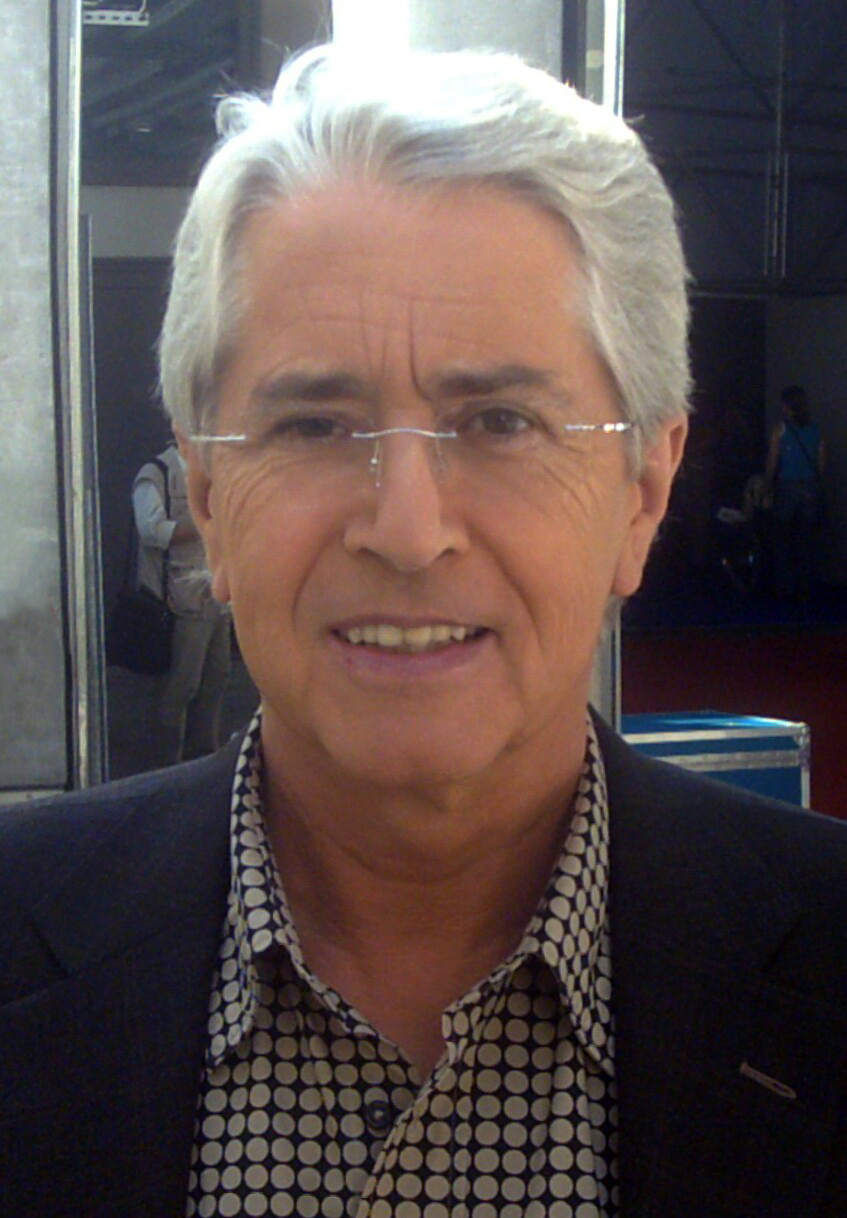
- Elstner in 2005
- Born: Timm Franz Maria Elstner; 19 April 1942 (age 83); Linz, Austria
- Occupation: Television presenter
- Children: 5

Timm Franz Maria Elstner (born 19 April 1942), known as Frank Elstner, is an Austrian-born German television presenter.

== Early life ==
Elstner went to school in Rastatt in Germany and gained his first experience in broadcasting as a child when he acted in radio plays for the station then known as Südwestfunk, now as Südwestrundfunk, which served the Rhineland Palatinate and southern Baden-Württemberg.

== Career ==
Elstner first became famous as a presenter (and later as the programme director) for the German radio broadcasting programme on Radio Luxembourg (until 1983). He started out in television with shows such as Spiel ohne Grenzen ("Game with No Limits"; the same as It's a Knockout) and Die Montagsmaler ("The Monday Sketchers"; a game similar to Pictionary).

In 1981, he invented the show Wetten, dass..? ("Wanna bet..?") which became extremely popular and was, for some time, one of the most successful shows in Europe. That year, Elstner was presented with a Bambi, the German television and media prize. In Britain the show was copied as You Bet! and ran from 1988 to 1997. Elstner presented the German show himself until 1987, appearing 39 times altogether, before handing it over to Thomas Gottschalk.

Elstner worked for ZDF television company for many years but moved to RTL when viewing figures dropped. There, he presented the German version of the quiz show Jeopardy!. He also has his own company, Elstnertainment, which develops new ideas for TV shows and sells them to both public service and private television companies.

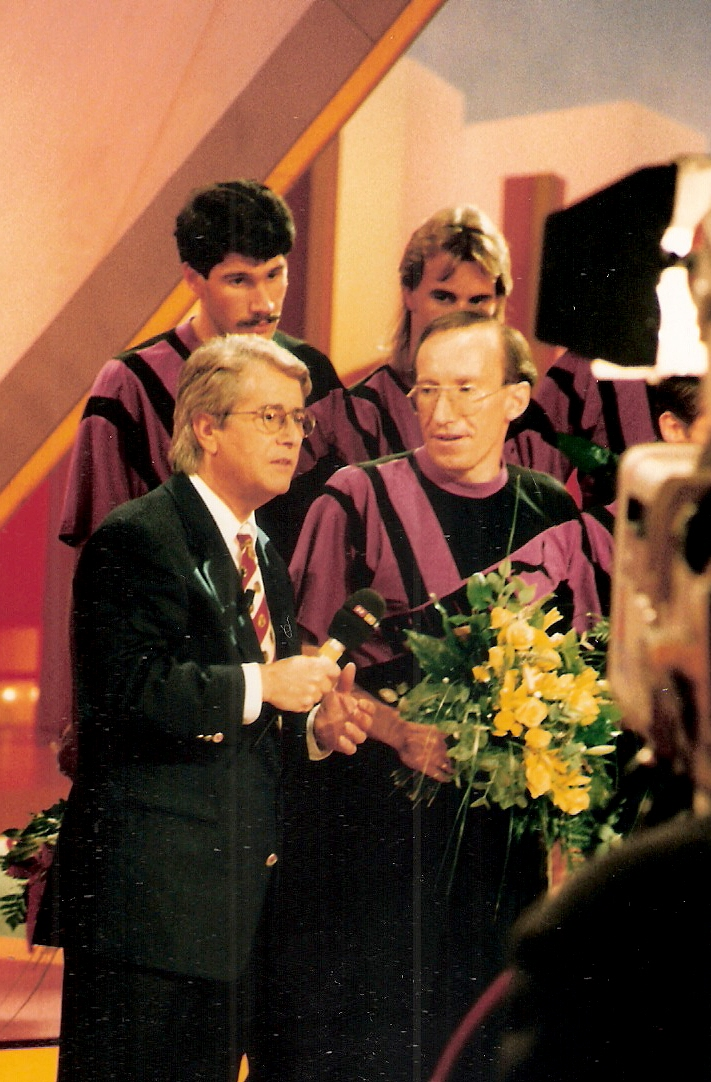
Elstner in 1993

Today, Elstner mainly works for Südwestrundfunk (SWR) again (formed from the old Südwestfunk and Süddeutscher Rundfunk), presenting the talk show Menschen der Woche. Since September 2002, he has worked for ARD as the presenter of the Saturday evening show Verstehen Sie Spaß?, the German equivalent of Candid Camera. Elstner presented his final episode of Verstehen Sie Spaß? on 21 November 2009. Until the start of 2005, he also presented the show Einfach Millionär ("Simply a Millionnaire") run by the ARD television lottery.

In 2006 Elstner was listed in the Rose d'Or Hall of Fame, on the 25th anniversary of his greatest success, Wetten, dass..?. The same year, he went on a 517-kilometre pilgrimage along the Way of St James, inspired by fellow television presenter Hape Kerkeling's pilgrimage diary Ich bin dann mal weg ("I'm off for a bit, then").

Since 12 September 2006, Elstner has presented the quiz show Die Besten im Südwesten ("The Best in the Southwest") on SWR. He also presents the ARD show Die große Show der Naturwunder ("The Biggest Natural Wonders Show"), along with Ranga Yogeshwar.

== Personal life ==
Elstner is married and has five children. He lives with his family in his own villa on Mallorca.

== Just One Last Question ==
A five-episode talk show hosted by Elstner called Just One Last Question premiered on Netflix on 12 June 2020.

=== Season 1 (2020) ===
No.	Title	Original release date
1	"Klaas Heufer-Umlauf"	12 June 2020
2	"Joko Winterscheidt"	12 June 2020
3	"Lena Meyer-Landrut"	12 June 2020
4	"Charlotte Roche"	12 June 2020
5	"Daniel Brühl"	12 June 2020

== See also ==
- German television comedy
- Wetten, dass..?
