= Carla Berrocal =

Spanish comics illustrator

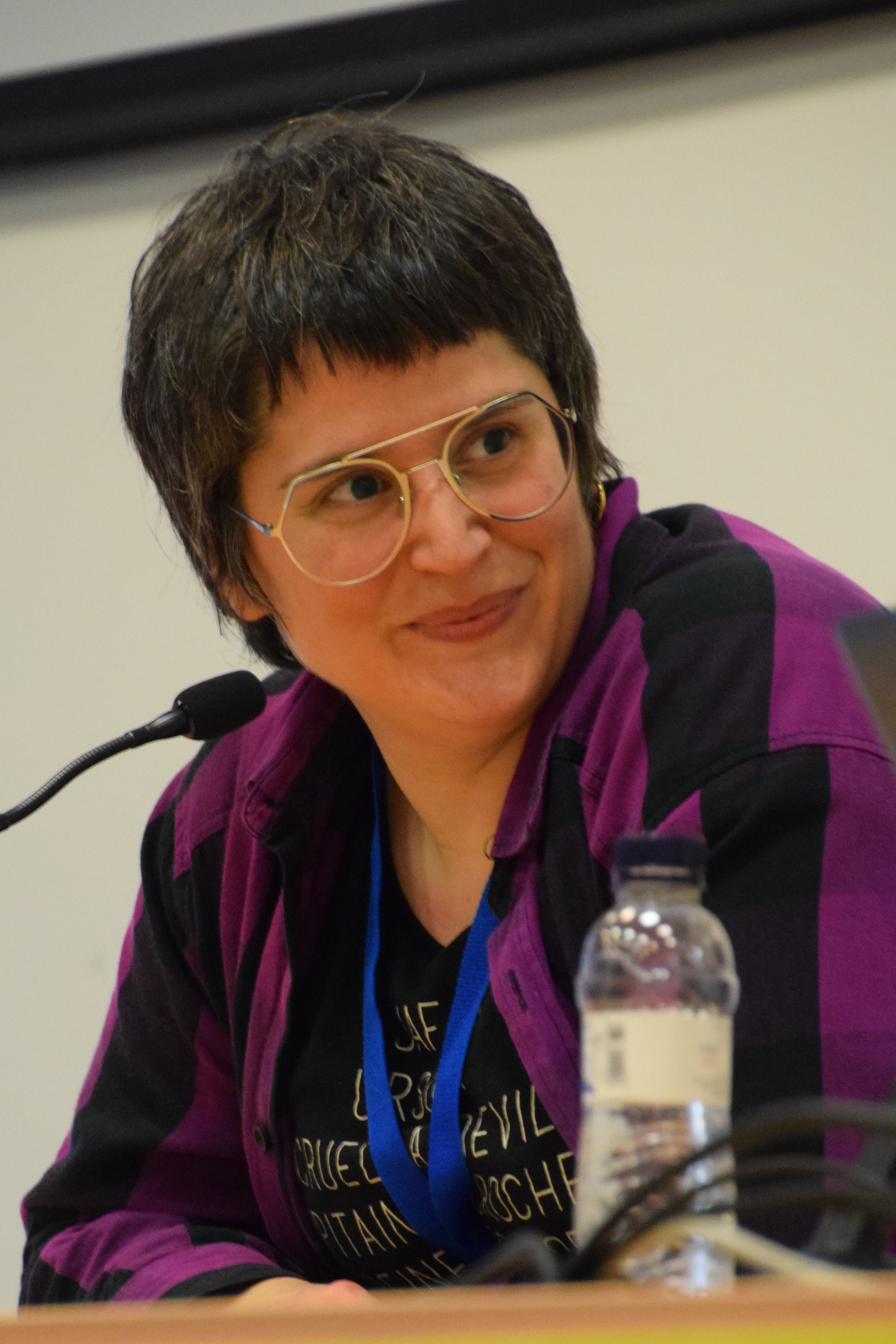
- Berrocal in 2019
- Born: 1983 (age 42–43); Madrid, Spain
- Education: School of Arts and Crafts of Madrid
- Occupation: Comic artist
- Organization: Professional Association of Illustrators of Madrid
- Website: www.carlaberrocal.com

Carla Berrocal (born 1983) is a Spanish comics illustrator. She is the president of the Professional Association of Illustrators of Madrid and one of the promoters of the Comic Authors' Collective.

== Biography ==
Berrocal graduated from the School of Arts and Crafts of Madrid and started working in the world of illustration and comics at a very young age. In 2011, she published her first graphic novel, El brujo (The Sorcerer), in which she explores the magical folklore of Chile. Three years later, she coordinated the graphic adaptation of the book Todas putas (All Whores) by Hernán Migoya, which had generated great controversy in 2003 when he was branded a misogynist and made an apology for rape. In this edition, Berrocal illustrated "El violador" (The Rapist), one of its most controversial stories.

In 2017, Berrocal exhibited a cartoon mural about black legends in the history of Madrid as part of the City in Vignettes program at the CentroCentro cultural area in Cybele Palace. That June, the Seville City Council chose Berrocal for the creation of the city's Sexual Diversity Month poster. The illustration was also part of the De Mil Amores exhibition in Seville, along with the works of 19 other artists, to promote LGBT visibility, with illustrations accompanying fragments of poems by Federico García Lorca, Gloria Fuertes, Luis Cernuda, and Rafael de León, among others.

In April 2018, she participated in the third edition of the LGBT Film Festival at the Oscar Niemeyer International Cultural Centre in Avilés, where she affirmed her lesbian and feminist identity. Berrocal combines her work as an illustrator with teaching: she is a narrative teacher and holds workshops on comics and graphic novels at various institutions. She also has a blog where she expresses her point of view on various topics from the design sector with the aim of transmitting everything learned during her professional career to future artists.
