= Francesc Betriu =

Catalan filmmaker

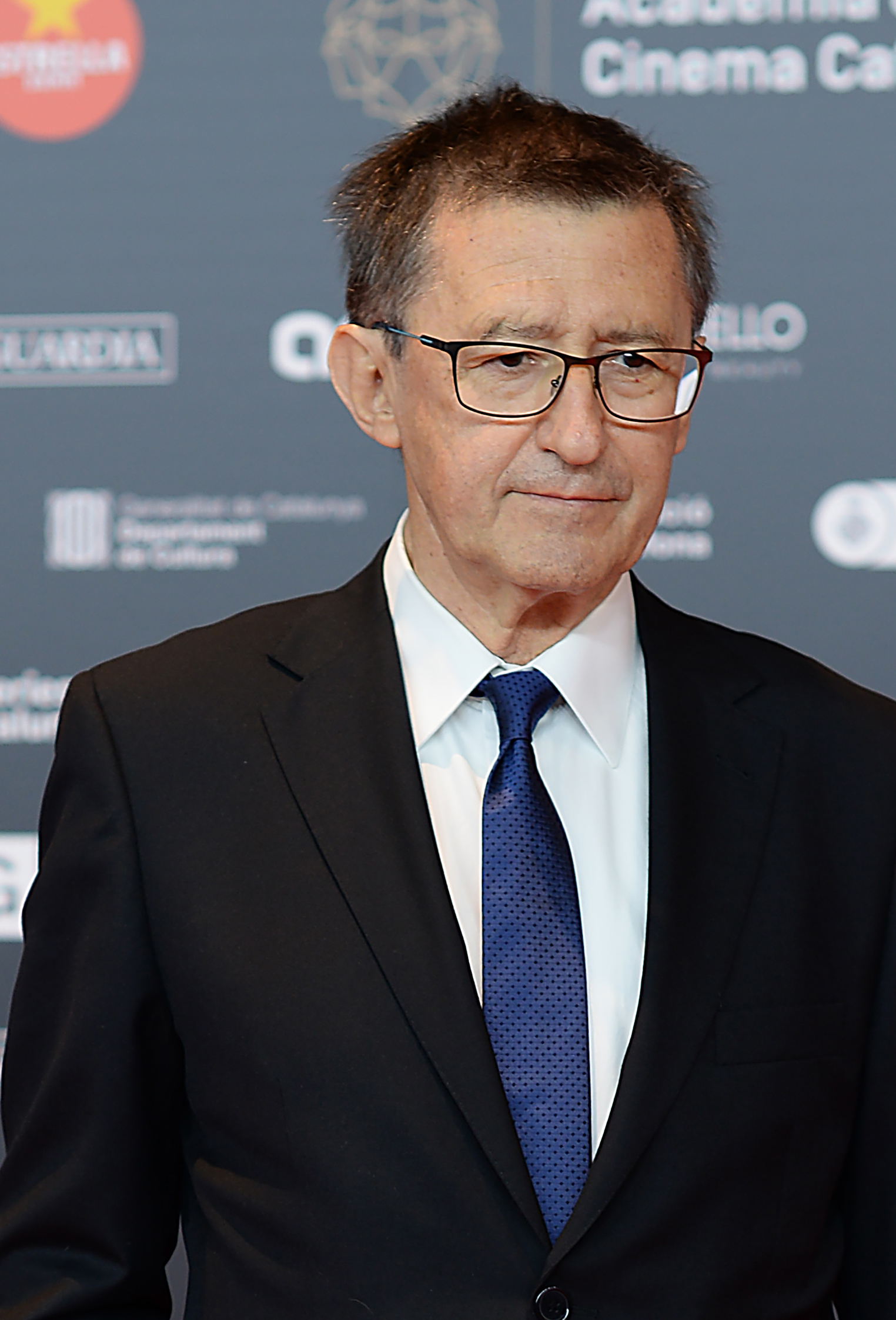
Francesc Betriu, XII Premis Gaudí (2020)

Francesc Betriu was a Spanish filmmaker. He was born in the town of Organyà, Lleida in 1940.

Corazón solitario marked his feature film debut in 1973, a film that is now rarely seen. This was followed by films such as Furia española (1974) and Los fieles sirvientes (1980). One of his best-known works is La plaça del Diamant (1982), an adaptation of a novel by Mercè Rodoreda. He then adapted Ramón J. Sender's 1953 short novel Réquiem por un campesino español (Requiem for a Spanish Peasant; 1985; nominated for the Golden Lion at the Venice Film Festival) and Raul Nunez's novel Sinatra (1988) for the screen. He also brought Juan Marsé's play Un día volveré (1993) to television.

He died in 2020.
