= Ana Obregón =

Spanish actress (born 1955)

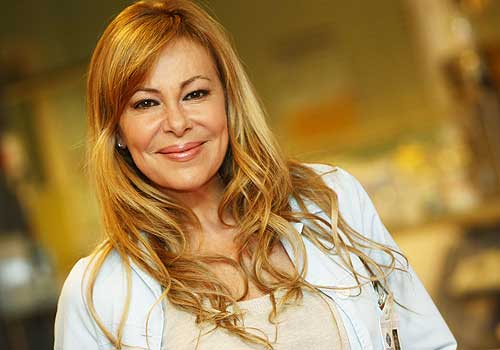
- Obregón in 2008
- Born: Ana Victoria García Obregón; 18 March 1955 (age 71); Madrid, Spain
- Education: Complutense University of Madrid
- Occupations: Actress, television presenter, socialite
- Children: 2

Ana Victoria García Obregón (born 18 March 1955), better known as Ana Obregón, is a Spanish actress, television presenter, and socialite. Obregón has appeared in European and American films but she is best known for her high-profile personal life and her career as a television presenter, hosting shows such as ¿Qué apostamos?, and, as a television actress, starring in television series such as Ana y los 7 and A las once en casa.

== Education ==
She obtained a master's degree in biology, specializing in zoology, from the Complutense University of Madrid and a Master of Business Administration in construction and real estate companies.

== Career ==
She made her film debut in 1979 and had an international film career with several films of medium resonance. She is best known to American audiences for her role as Bo Derek's sidekick in Bolero (1984). She also starred in Jules Verne's Mystery on Monster Island (1981) and the 3-D action adventure film Treasure of the Four Crowns (1983) with Tony Anthony. She also appeared in an episode of Who's the Boss? –playing Ana, Tony Micelli's Italian cousin– and in an episode of The A-Team.

In the mid-1980s she began her career in television in Spain. Between 1993 and 1998 she hosted the prime-time game show ¿Qué apostamos? along with Ramón García on Televisión Española (TVE). The success with this show allowed her to host numerous television galas and special shows from then on. On 14–15 October 1994, she hosted the 23rd edition of the OTI Festival at Teatro Principal in Valencia along Francisco.

Obregón hosted the New Year bells on TVE from the Puerta del Sol in: 1994/95, with Joaquín Prat; 1995/96 and 2004/05 with Ramón García; 2020/21 with Anne Igartiburu; and 2022/23 with Los Morancos. She was intended to host the 2021/22 edition, but was replaced by weatherman Jacob Petrus after testing positive for COVID-19. She also hosted the millennium bells in 1999/2000 on Antena 3, with Pedro Rollán.

She made a career as a television actress, participating in series such as Hostal Royal Manzanares (1996–1997) and A las once en casa (1998–1999). In 2002, she created, scripted and starred in the series Ana y los 7. This series achieved great audience success, adding a total of 91 episodes in five seasons, and had remakes in Portugal, Mexico, Italy and Chile.

She appeared as a contestant on Series 7 of ¡Mira quién baila!, in Series 4 of MasterChef Celebrity and as a panellist on Series 3 of Mask Singer: Adivina quién canta.

== In the gossip press ==
A staple of the Spanish prensa rosa or gossip press, Obregón is also famous in Spain and Britain for a long relationship with Croatia striker Davor Šuker as well as a supposed liaison with the Real Madrid and England international football player David Beckham. This led to a spat with Beckham's wife Victoria. Obregón later denied any sexual misconduct on her part, but sued instead.

== Controversies ==
Obregón was one of Jeffrey Epstein's clients at his consulting firm, Intercontinental Assets Group Inc. (IAG). In 1982 Epstein, then a high-level bounty hunter, helped her to recover her father's millions in lost investments, which had disappeared when Drysdale Government Securities collapsed because of fraud.

Obregón found herself in the midst of controversy in 2007 following information disclosed by Interviú, and subsequently published by the major newspapers in Spain: according to said media, an ostensibly distraught Obregón allegedly called her bodyguard Eloy Sánchez Barba in order to ask him to hire third parties to beat up or physically assault journalist Jaime Cantizano for what she deemed to be an unacceptable public exposure of her teenage son. According to sources, she said: "...but I don't want this done by just anyone, I want you to have los Miami doing this", in reference to a well-known criminal group established mainly in Madrid. Unbeknownst to her and Sánchez Barba, the latter's telephone line had been tapped by the Spanish police in connection to their investigation of a hit job presumably coordinated by Sánchez Barba months before.

== Personal life ==
In 1992, she gave birth to her only son Alejandro Alfonso (Álex or Aless) Lequio García, fathered by Spanish-Italian socialite Alessandro Lecquio. In 2020, Álex Lequio died of Ewing sarcoma. In 2021, she also lost her mother to old age. Following the deaths of her mother and son, she exited the entertainment industry. In 2022, her father Antonio died as well.

On 20 March 2023, Obregón became the grandmother of a girl, whom she named Ana Sandra (Analé) Lequio Obregón, by surrogacy. She later revealed that the girl was fathered by her deceased son, who preserved samples of his sperm before beginning cancer treatment, and the ovum of a donor. Ana Sandra was born at the Memorial Regional Hospital in Florida. Although surrogacy is illegal in Spain, adopting a child born abroad was lawful at the time. In an interview with ¡Hola! magazine in May 2023, Obregón referred to Ana Sandra as her "granddaughter".

== Selected filmography ==
=== Film ===
| Year | Title | Role | Notes |
|---|---|---|---|
| 1980 | Spoiled Children | Amparito | |
| 1981 | Car Crash | Janice | |
| 1981 | Jules Verne's Mystery on Monster Island | Meg Hollaney / Meg Calderón | |
| 1982 | Regreso del más allá | | |
| 1983 | Treasure of the Four Crowns | Liz | |
| 1984 | Bolero | Catalina | |
| 1987 | Policía | Luisa | |
| 1987 | La vida alegre | Carolina | |
| 1998 | Sinatra | Isabel | |
| 1991 | ¿Lo sabe el ministro? | Marta Figueras | |
| 1998 | The Naked Eye | Marian | |
| 2011 | Torrente 4: Lethal Crisis | Widow | |
| 2016 | Santiago Apóstol | Reina Loba | |

=== Television series ===
| Date | Title | Role | Network | Notes |
|---|---|---|---|---|
| 1986 | The A-Team | Marta | NBC | 1 episode |
| 1987 | Who's the Boss? | Ana | ABC | 1 episode |
| 1996–1997 | Hostal Royal Manzanares | Sonsy | Televisión Española | 43 episodes |
| 1998 | Blasco Ibáñez, la novela de su vida | Elena Ortúzar Chita | Televisión Española | 2 episodes |
| 1998–1999 | A las once en casa | Paula | Televisión Española | 54 episodes |
| 2002–2005 | Ana y los 7 | Ana García Palermo | Televisión Española | 92 episodes |

=== Television shows ===
| Date | Title | Role | Network | Notes |
|---|---|---|---|---|
| 1991 | Caliente | Host | Televisión Española | 12 episodes |
| 1993–1998 | ¿Qué apostamos? | Host | Televisión Española | 70 episodes |
| 2016 | Algo pasa con Ana | Herself | DKISS | 8 episodes |
| 2024 | Mask Singer: Adivina quién canta | Herself / Popcorn | Antena 3 | 1 episode |
