= Jordi Estadella =

- Born: Jorge Estadella Gracia; 11 November 1948; Barcelona, Spain
- Died: 30 April 2010 (aged 61); Barcelona, Spain
- Occupations: Journalist, Film dubber, Voice actor

Jordi Estadella Gracia (11 November 1948 – 30 April 2010) was a Spanish voice actor, journalist, radio and television host and film dubber. Estadella's career spanned more than 40 years. He was best known to Spaniards as the host of the game show, Un, dos, tres... responda otra vez, from 1991 until 1993.

Estadella began his career in 1970 at Radio Juventud de Barcelona (Barcelona Youth Radio). He began working as a voice actor and dubber beginning in 1977, providing in the Spanish and Catalan voices of dozens of actors and characters in film, including Groucho Marx, Richard Guilliland, Jerry Lewis and Luc Durand in Inspector Gadget.

Estadella made his television debut in 1985 as host of the TV3 talk show, Piano Bar. In 1990, he began presenting the Televisión Española show, No te rías, que es peor. Estadella further increased his television presence nationwide in 1991 as host of the popular game show, Un, dos, tres... responda otra vez, which he continued to host until 1993. The role made Estadella a household name throughout Spain.

He spent much of the next two decades working with either the Telecinco television station or the Catalan channel, TV3. In his later years, Estadella returned to radio, hosting several gastronomical shows, including De boca en boca on COM Radio de Barcelona. He was also the host of the Spanish version of Greed.

Jordi Estadella died at the Hospital Clínic de Barcelona at 4 a.m. on 30 April 2010 at the age of 61, after suffering from liver cancer.
