= Raúl Nuñez =

Argentine writer

Raúl Nuñez (1946/47-1996) was an Argentine writer.

== Works ==
Poetry

- Poemas de los ángeles náufragos (1970)
- San John López del Camino (1971)
- Juglarock (La Mano en el Cajón, 1972)
- People (Tusquets Editores, 1974)
- Cannabis flan (Editorial Marte, 1983)
- Marihuana para los pájaros, anthology (Baile del Sol, 2008)

Novels

- Derrama whisky sobre tu amigo muerto (Producciones Editoriales, 1979)
- Sinatra. Novela urbana (Anagrama, 1984)
- La rubia del bar (Anagrama, 1986)
- A solas con Betty Boop (Laia, 1989)
- Fuera de combate, unpublished

Short novels and articles

- El aullido del mudo (Midons Editorial, 1994)
- Resaca / Hank Over. Un homenaje a Charles Bukowski (Caballo de Troya / Random House Mondadori, 2008)

Other

- La rubia del bar. Script (1985) Ventura Pons and Raúl Núñez
