= CMM TV =

- Country: Spain
- Broadcast area: Castilla–La Mancha

Ownership
- Owner: Castilla-La Mancha Media

History
- Launched: 13 December 2001

Links
- Website: rtvcm.es

CMM TV, originally known as Castilla-La Mancha Televisión (CMT), is the public regional channel of the autonomous region of Castilla–La Mancha (Spain). It belongs to Castilla-La Mancha Media (CMM), the public broadcasting service in the region.

== Creation ==
Regular transmissions began on 13 December 2001. The first program aired was a documentary, followed by the evening newscast.

== Headquarters and newsdesks ==
The head office is in the city of Toledo. There are also local offices in Albacete, Ciudad Real, Cuenca, Guadalajara, Puertollano, Talavera de la Reina and Madrid, as well as a foreign correspondent in New York City.

== Programming and audience ==
CMT has a wide range of programs. It is placed among the public regional networks in Spain with the best audience rates. Among its flagship programs is "Tal Como Somos" ("The way we are"), presented by journalist and writer Teresa Viejo, and "Nuestro Campo Bravo" ("Our wild field"), which was awarded a prize from the Spanish Television Academy.

== Future developments ==
During the first months of 2008, it is expected to launch an international satellite channel, "CMT SAT", which intends to be a window to the culture of the Castilla–La Mancha region. In addition to that, a second TV channel, called CMT 2, has started test transmission on TDT (Digital terrestrial television). However the date of the beginning of regular programming remains unknown.
