= Aragón TV =

- Country: Spain
- Broadcast area: Aragon

Programming
- Picture format: 1080i HDTV (downscalling to 16:9 576i for the SD channel)

Ownership
- Owner: CARTV−Televisión Autonómica de Aragón S.A.

History
- Launched: 21 April 2006

Aragón TV is a radio and television network in Aragon, named CARTV−Corporación Aragonesa de Radio y Televisión. It is state media, owned by Televisión Autonómica de Aragón S.A.

It is part of the Spanish government's FORTA media network, and has an international channel Aragón TV INT.

== History ==
In 1987 the procedures for the establishment of a public television in Aragon began, on April 15 the Aragonese Radio and Television Corporation (CARTV) was founded, however, due to a challenge from the central government the CARTV was put on hiatus until 1990.

Although since 1991 works began to build the headquarters of the public radio and television of Aragon, the lack of political agreements kept the establishment of the media on hold. For this reason, in July 1993, an agreement was signed between the regional government and the Antena 3 channel for the broadcast of programming aimed at Aragón for three hours a day, however, in September of the same year the project was discarded due to a motion of no confidence that caused a political change in the regional government. After the closure of Antena 3 Aragón, the Aragón government kept the project on hold since talks began for the regionalization of TVE-2, however, this project was scrapped.

In May 2003 a new change of government was presented, the arrival of the socialist Marcelino Iglesias to the Government of Aragon reactivated the project for the creation of a public television channel in Aragon. Between 2004 and 2005 all the necessary legal and labor procedures were carried out to establish the channel with the aim of launching it at the end of 2005.

Aragón TV began broadcasting tests at the beginning of December 2005. On 25 February 2006, they broadcast a football match between Real Zaragoza and FC Barcelona, returning to a test phase after.

The official first broadcast of Aragón TV began on 21 April 2006. On 11 September, the channel began broadcasting 24 hours a day.

In May 2007, Aragón Sat was launched, a channel aimed at the rest of Spain and Europe, which only transmitted Aragón TV's own production programming. This channel closed in 2010 because CARTV opted for transmission through the Internet to save money costs. In 2015 CARTV recovered the international signal from Aragón TV, but under the name Aragón Internacional

In June 2007, the second public television channel, Aragón 2 HD, was launched, which was the first Spanish television channel with HD broadcasts. The channel had differentiated programming from Aragón TV, since it focused on high-definition content such as movies, concerts, documentaries and sporting events, however on some occasions this channel worked to cover events that overlapped with others that were broadcast on the main channel. Aragón 2 HD closed in April 2017 to make way for Aragón TV HD, a simulcast version of the main channel.

During the years 2012 and 2013 the channel achieved its best audience records, becoming the most watched television channel in Aragon for the first time in October 2013. After a period of declining viewership, in 2024 the channel regained prominence in viewer numbers, reaching a record high in October 2025 with a 15.1% share of viewers in Aragon.

In 2019 the channel began to broadcast half an hour of weekly programming in the Aragonese language, one of the regional languages which has an approximate number of 50,000 passive speakers.

== Programming ==
Aragón TV broadcasts general programming, highlighting news and entertainment programs such as contests and current affairs magazines. The channel complements its programming with series and movies, especially westerns. Like other regional channels, Aragón TV has programming aimed at an older audience compared to national channels. Most of the programming is done in Spanish, with the exception of the half-hour weekly magazine Charrín Charrán, which is broadcast in Aragonese.
