= Brett Adams =

English singer, songwriter and actor

- Born: 29 December 1976 (age 49); Newcastle, UK
- Occupations: Actor, singer, songwriter
- Television: Byker Grove

Brett Adams (born 29 December 1976) is an English singer, songwriter and actor.

He gained prominence as Noddy in CBBC's Byker Grove (a character best remembered for being the first teenage gay character in a children's drama).

After leaving Byker Grove he went on to hit The Official Charts and perform around the world in boyband Point Break.

== Television ==
Brett played Noddy, one of the main characters who first appeared in the 1990 series of Byker Grove and left in the 1995 series staying for 6 seasons.

The character is best remembered for being the first teenage gay character in a children's drama. Brett's portrayal of Noddy and that famous kiss scene (the first kiss shared between two men on children's TV) when Noddy kissed his friend Gary (George Trotter) at the cinema was the first time sexuality and dealing with coming out had been tackled on a children's show and the moment went down in history.

After the episode aired in 1994 it was on the news and in the papers and there was a lot of negativity from the British press, which even led The Sun newspaper to call for producer Matthew Robinson to be sacked at the time.

But Brett also received a lot of letters from youngs boys saying how much it had helped them coming out and not feel alone, Brett said in a recent interview with Attitude Magazine, "If my storyline upset 10,000 people but helped one person then I see it as a monumental success."

Brett Adams character Noddy Inspired many long men in Britain growing up and Noddy's final scene in Byker Grove when he drives away from the Grove in his boyfriends jeep even inspired writer Russell T Davis to pay homage by making the lead character Stuart in TV series Queer as Folk drive a black jeep. Davis said in an interview with Attitude Magazine "One of the few fan letters I've ever written was to the man who's producing Byker Grove, because in the second year they did that story," said Davies, "Noddy got a boyfriend, and they had to write them out because they had nowhere else to go. But they drove off together in a black jeep. It was so fantastic to watch that on children's television at ten past five in the afternoon. And you were sitting watching it thinking: 'They have sex! Those two boys have sex! They're not showing it, but they absolutely have sex. That's fact.' And the black jeep became one of my favourite symbols of gayness."

His younger brother Grant Adams also played Ed in Byker Grove.

In 2004 he was the Mystery Guest on Never Mind the Buzzcocks.

== Music ==
After Brett Adams, George Trotter and David 'Ollie' Oliver left UK children's TV programme Byker Grove they formed the band "Aurora". George eventually left and was replaced by Jon who had to drop out due to illness, they were looking for a new member and then discovered Declan Bennett and Point Break was formed after signing to Warner Music and managed by Danielle Barnett.

The band released five singles, four of which made the UK top 20 ("Stand Tough" made it to number 7 in the charts), and an album, which was number one in three countries in South east Asia, including Japan, and made the UK top 40.

They went on to perform on Top of the Pops.

Their song Stand Tough was used in Australia as the Seven Network's theme for coverage of the AFL in 2000.

== Discography ==
=== Albums ===
Title	Album details	Peak chart positions		
Title	Album details	UK	FIN	JPN
Apocadelic	Released: 7 August 2000; Label: Eternal Records; Formats: CD	21	35	83

=== Singles ===
Year	Title	Peak chart positions			Album
Year	Title	UK	AUS	JPN	Album
1999	"Do We Rock?"	29	—	7	Apocadelic
2000	"Stand Tough"	7	49	10	Apocadelic
2000	"Freakytime"	13	—	11	Apocadelic
2000	"You"	14	—	—	Apocadelic
2000	"What About Us?"	24	—	—	Apocadelic
