= Byker Grove =

British children's television series (1989–2006)

- Also known as: Byker
- Genre: Teen drama
- Created by: Adele Rose; Andrea Wonfor
- Directed by: Various
- Starring: Various
- Theme music composer: Kane Gang; Simon Etchell
- Country of origin: United Kingdom
- Original language: English
- No. of series: 18
- No. of episodes: 344

Production
- Executive producers: Andrea Wonfor (1989–1990); Ian Squires (1990–1992); Ivan Rendall (1992–1995); Matthew Robinson (1995–1997)
- Producers: Matthew Robinson (1989–1995); Helen Gregory (1995–1997); Stephen McAteer (1997–1999); Morag Bain (1999–2001); Edward Pugh (2002–2005); Tim Holloway (2006)
- Production location: Newcastle upon Tyne
- Running time: 25 minutes
- Production company: Zenith Entertainment (1989–2006)

Original release
- Network: BBC One (1989–2005); CBBC (2006)
- Release: 8 November 1989 – 10 December 2006

Byker Grove is a British teen drama and coming-of-age television series which aired between 1989 and 2006 on BBC One and later CBBC.

The show was set in Byker, Newcastle upon Tyne, and was filmed in nearby Benwell. It was created by writer Adele Rose and executive producer Andrea Wonfor. The show was broadcast at 5:10 p.m. after Newsround (later moved to 5 p.m.). It was aimed at an older teenager and young adult audience, tackling serious and sometimes controversial storylines. The show is notable for depicting the first gay kiss on children's television, as well as its breach of the fourth wall in the final series.

== History ==
The show ran for 18 series between 1989 and 2006, and was set in a youth club in the Byker district of Newcastle upon Tyne, England. In 1987, Wonfor approached soap writer Adele Rose and together they created a single pilot episode featuring children aged 8–11 at an out-of-school club. In autumn 1988, Wonfor gained the backing of Anna Home, then Head of the Children's Department at BBC Television. Home gave the go ahead for a run of a series of six 25-minute episodes to be broadcast by the BBC. The age of the main characters was raised to 12–16 after support from first producer-director, Matthew Robinson. The first series centred on young teenagers growing from childhood to adulthood.

On 11 March 2008, it was reported that Gallowgate Productions, the TV production company owned by Ant McPartlin and Declan Donnelly, purchased the rights to Byker Grove. In July 2023, Ant & Dec, who previously played characters PJ & Duncan in the series, revealed they would be producing a reboot of the programme in 2024, under the name Byker, in conjunction with production companies Mitre Studios (their own production company, named after the filming location for the programme) and Fulwell 73. Executive producers will include Ant McPartlin and Declan Donnelly. In September 2024, Ant & Dec revealed that the project was still in the early stages of development.

== Production ==
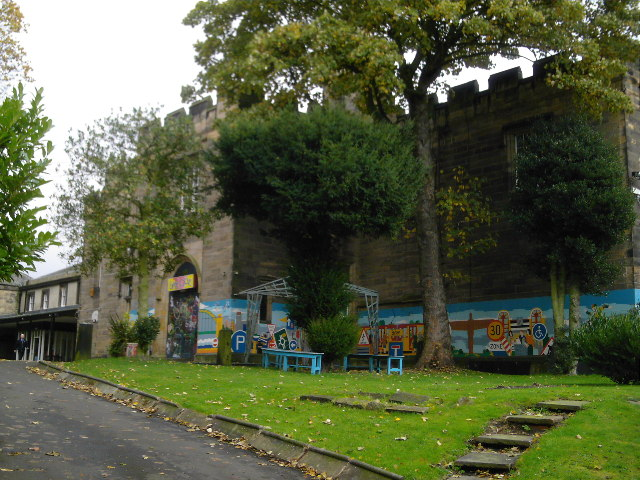
The Mitre, also known as Benwell Towers, acted as the production offices and the fictional youth club.

Byker Grove was not filmed in the Byker area of Newcastle. The actual youth club set was in Benwell, which is in the west area of the city, Byker being in the east. Byker Metro station (the suburban rail network in Newcastle and the Tyne and Wear area) and other landmarks in the real Byker (such as the Byker Wall and surrounding estate) were used for filming backdrops.

The youth club building seen on-screen is The Mitre, which used to be a nightclub and a pub (which was mentioned in a few storylines from episodes in the late 1990s). After the success of the first series (six episodes, 1989), The Mitre was bought by the BBC's London property department, which then granted Zenith Television a permanent licence to film the series there.

Scenes representing Denton Burn Youth Club for Series 15 were filmed at Raby Street Youth Club, in the buildings next to Byker Primary School. This is the real youth club for the children of Byker.

=== Cancellation ===
On 11 May 2006, the BBC announced that the series would be ending after 17 years as part of a broader strategy for CBBC to focus more tightly on the primary-school age group as its core audience. Shortly after the announcement Richard Deverell, head of CBBC, was interviewed on Newsround about the decision to axe Byker Grove. Filming wrapped on 24 August, and the final series, moved to the CBBC Channel, started on 7 October 2006.

In July 2025, STV Player and ITVX signed a co-exclusivity deal with Ant and Dec's production company Mitre Studios to become the first streaming services to provide every episode. Initially, the first five series were available to stream on STV Player, with the remaining series available on both services later in the year. The entire series became available on ITVX on 16 November 2025.

=== Cast and crew ===
Byker Grove launched the careers of Ant McPartlin ("P.J.") and Declan Donnelly ("Duncan"), who are otherwise known as Ant & Dec, as well as the actress Jill Halfpenny, Donna Air, former CBBC presenter Andrew Hayden-Smith and Emmerdale actors Dale Meeks, Charlie Hardwick, Chelsea Halfpenny, Laura Norton and Victoria Hawkins. Also appearing in the series was the now glamour model Francoise Boufhal ("Ellie Baines") and Charlie Hunnam, who later starred in the American TV series Sons of Anarchy and co-starred in Pacific Rim (2013).

The founder producer/director (1989–95) was Matthew Robinson. After being promoted to become executive producer of Byker Grove for two years (1995–97), he became executive producer of EastEnders, then Head of Drama for BBC Wales, and now runs Khmer Mekong Films in Cambodia. Byker Grove was also home to writers such as Catherine Johnson (who went on to pen Mamma Mia!, the ABBA musical) and Matthew Graham (This Life, Doctor Who and co-creator of BBC One's Life on Mars). The first writer was Adele Rose—in Series 1 she wrote episodes 1–4 and 6; her daughter, Carrie Rose, wrote episode 5. The most prolific writer was Brian B. Thompson, who wrote 50 episodes over 12 series. Byker Grove gave Academy Award-winning director Tom Hooper his first break into TV drama when he directed four episodes in 1997.

Si King, one half of the Hairy Bikers, also worked on the show.

The cast and crew from the first 10 years of the show held their first reunion on 19 May 2012 in the Quayside area of Newcastle upon Tyne and on a river boat cruise.

== Storylines ==
Byker Grove was not intended for young children, but aimed at a young adult and teenage audience, as it tackled controversial subjects such as drug addiction, child abuse, homelessness, teen pregnancy, homophobia and abortion. Although some of the action took place outside the youth club, the series was unusual among dramas in that the characters were rarely shown in school. One of the major settings was the foster home run by the kindly but strict Lou Gallagher, the longest-running character. Byker Grove was included by The Guardian in a 2018 list of "definitive" shows for teenagers; Iman Amrani describes it as "the north's answer to Grange Hill", praising its "gritty" writing, which took on difficult topics such as sexual relationships (including those which were same sex) and foster care.

In November 1994, Byker Grove featured the first gay kiss on UK children's television. It broached the subject of "coming out" when Noddy Fishwick kissed his close friend Gary Hendrix at the back of a cinema. This scene caused outrage in the British tabloids and calls for producer Matthew Robinson to be sacked. However, the BBC strongly backed the storyline, which received countrywide support from gay teenagers, many teachers, and parents. The 2004 series saw the character of Bradley agonising over his sexuality and eventually coming out as gay to his girlfriend Sadie, after a romantic holiday together had failed to live up to their expectations.

The series frequently depicted life as unjust, with bad things happening to good people, such as Flora's death from a brain tumour, Greg's fall from the roof of the Grove which left him paralysed from the waist down, Jemma Dobson being electrocuted by a faulty electricity mains socket and youth leader Geoff Keegan's death in an accidental gas explosion after 11 years on the show.

Byker Grove frequently confronted viewers with repercussions for the characters' actions, often permanent. These ranged from the comical to the tragic; characters who stole and joy-rode cars often died in them, starting with Gill, and ultimately Craig running over Ben Carter. P.J. was blinded during an illicit and unsupervised paintballing session, in which he ignored warnings and removed his face guard, in a scene filmed on location at Aydon Castle near Corbridge.

The central storyline of the first three series was the character of London teenager Julie Warner (Lucy Walsh) struggling to fit in and adjust to life in working class Newcastle and her relationship with the rebellious Martin "Gill" Gillespie. In the show's final episode the characters discover that they do not exist and are the creation of unseen characters known as "The Writers" who plan to conclude the show by demolishing the Grove. However, numerous present and former Grove members buy enough time for the characters to re-write the ending so that the club will remain open forever, but ultimately fail to stop it being demolished.

Until Series 10 (1998) the rival youth club was known as Denton Burn. In Series 13 (2001) rival youth club members were known as the Denwell Burners as they were from a youth club in Denwell Burn. This is a fictitious area of Newcastle upon Tyne, the name coming from a mixture of Benwell and Denton Burn.

== The bands of Byker Grove ==
A number of musical acts have been spun off from the series. These include:

- Michelle Charles (under the guise of Charley, which was her character name) – "The Best Thing", "For the Good Times"
- PJ & Duncan — who became Ant & Dec for The Cult of... album (Singles include "Let's Get Ready to Rhumble", "Better Watch Out" and "We're On The Ball")
- Byker Grooove – girl band starring Donna Air ('Charlie'), Jayni Hoy ('Leah') and Vicky Taylor ('Angel') whose single "Love Your Sexy...!!" reached No. 48 on the UK Singles Chart in December 1994. Byker Grooove evolved into the duo Crush with Jayni Hoy and Donna Air. (Singles included "Jellyhead" (UK No. 50) and "Luv'd Up" (UK No. 45) on Telstar Records.) In the United States, where Byker Grove did not air and nor was the Crush duo promoted as being associated with the series, "Jellyhead" reached No. 72 on the Billboard Hot 100 in December 1996. The song "Jellyhead" also charted in Australia from early February 1997, peaking at No. 32 in early April 1997, spending 23 weeks within the ARIA Top 100 Singles chart, 13 of which were in the Top 50.
- Summer Matthews – aka Emma Miller (Single: "Little Miss Perfect")
- Point Break, boyband featuring Brett Adams ('Noddy') and David Oliver ('Marcus'). (Singles include "Do We Rock", "Stand Tough" and "Freakytime" on Eternal Records.)

Other bands connected to Byker Grove include:

- Freefaller – includes David Oliver of Point Break
- Kane Gang – writers of the original theme music, a development from the "Ooh Gary Davies on your radio" jingle for BBC Radio 1.
- Kenickie - bassist Emmy Kate Montrose appeared in the series, credited under her real name, Emma Jackson.

== List of characters ==
=== Grove staff ===
There have been several youth leaders working at the Grove over the years. The following is a list of all the ones shown on-screen.

Character	Actor	Duration	Role
Geoff Keegan	Billy Fane	1989–2000	Youth leader
Akili Johnson	Patrick Miller	2000–2006	Youth leader
Alison Fletcher	Vicky Murray	1989–1996	Assistant Youth Leader
Sian Earl	Charlie Hardwick	1996–1999, 2000	Assistant Youth Leader
Tina Meredith	Lynne Wilmot	2000–2002	Assistant Youth Leader
Dom Meredith	Daymon Britton	2002–2006	Assistant Youth Leader
Cher Coates	Jody Baldwin	2003	Assistant Youth Leader
Chrissie Harrison	Sarah Lawton	2003–2006	Assistant Youth Leader
Mary O'Malley	Lyn Douglas	1989–1991	Other staff
Rajeev Patel	Daniel Larson	1989	Other staff
Steve "Brad" Bradley	Michael Nicholson	1989–1991, 1994	Other staff
Gwen	Linda Huntley	1990	Other staff
Dexter Dutton	Gavin Kitchen	1990–1992	Other staff
Lloyd	Graham Overton	1991–1992	Other staff
Marv Ellous	Craig Wilson	1991–1992	Other staff

=== Grove members ===
This is a list of characters who appeared in the show as members of the Grove from 1989 to 2006. (When surname is not listed, it is either unknown, or was never mentioned in the show.)

Character	Actor	Duration
Donna Bell	Sally McQuillan	1989–91 (3 series)
Fraser Campbell	John Jefferson	1989–92 (4 series)
Kirsty "Spuggie" Campbell	Lyndyann Barrass	1989–92 (4 series)
Speedy Clark	Stephen Bradley	1989–92 (4 series)
Nicola Dobson	Jill Halfpenny	1989–92 (4 series)
Martin "Gill" Gillespie	Caspar Berry	1989–90 (2 series)
Winston Hardy	Craig Reilly	1989–92 (4 series)
Kelly	Louise Towers	1989–91 (3 series)
Hayley Oduru	Amanda Webster	1989–90 (2 series)
Andrew "Cas" Pearson	Niall Shearer	1989–90 (2 series)
Duncan Sperring	Declan Donnelly	1989–93; 1994; 2000 (returned for Geoff's funeral)
Julie Warner	Lucy Walsh	1989–91 (3 series)
Ian Webster	Craig Grieveson	1989–90 (2 series)
Carl	Peter Eke	1990–91 (2 series)
Marilyn "Charley" Charlton	Michelle Charles	1990–92 (3 series)
Debbie Dobson	Nicola Bell	1990–94; cameo 1995
Jemma Dobson	Nicola Ewart	1990–94 (5 series)
Joanne Gallagher	Michelle Warden	1990–92 (3 series)
Greg	Dale Meeks	1990–94 (appeared sporadically in the series)
Peter "PJ" Jenkins	Anthony McPartlin	1990–93; 2000 (returned for Geoff's funeral)
Jan Peterson	Marten Lind	1990 (1 series)
Robert	Christopher Hardy	1990–91 (2 series)
Paul Skerrett	Joe Caffrey	1990–92 (3 series)
Tessa Awe	Olive Simbo	1991–92 (2 series)
Marcus Bewick	David Oliver	1991–93 (3 series)
Amanda Bewick	Gemma Graham	1991–95 (5 series)
Danny Dimmoro	Steven Fox	1991 (1 series)
Norman "Noddy" Fishwick	Brett Adams	1991–95 (5 series)
Angel O'Hagan	Vicky Taylor	1991–96; 2000 (returned for Geoff's funeral)
Bill Paul	Scott Paul	1991–92 (2 series)
Lee Ratcliffe	Rory Gibson	1991–94 (4 series)
Chrissy Van Der Berg	Lyndsey Todd	1991–92; 1995 (cameo)
Leah Carmichael	Jayni Hoy	1992–95 (4 series)
"Charlie" Charlton	Donna Air	1992–95 (4 series)
"Morph" Evans	Tracy Dempster	1992–93 (2 series)
Barney Hardy	Stephen Carr	1992–96 (5 series)
Teraise O'Hagan	Adele Taylor	1992–2001; 2003
Patsy Rowan	Justine McKenzie	1992–95 (4 series)
Frew	Luke Dale	1992–96 (5 series)
Ed Caseley	Grant Adams	1993–97 (5 series)
Kolton Evans	Stevie Lee Patterson	1993–94
Fran	Emma Louise Webb	1993
Marie Hallovan	Louise Mostyn	1993–96 (4 series)
Gary Hendrix	George Trotter	1993–96 (4 series)
Arran Hope	Neil Blackstone	1993–96 (4 series)
Flora McKay	Kerry Ann Christiansen	1993–97 (5 series)
Brigid O'Hagan	Joanne McIntosh	1993–98; 2000 (returned for Geoff's funeral)
Dale Puttifoot	Leslie Baines	1993–95 (3 series)
Alfie Turnbull	Andrew Smith	1993–97 (5 series)
Anna Turnbull	Claire Graham	1993–97 (5 series)
Terry Carter	Chris Woodger	1994–98; 2000; 2001; 2003
Karen Grant	Kimberly Dunbar	1994–2000 (7 series)
Laura Dobson	Emma Brierly	1995 (1 series)
Sita Rabi	Gauri Vedhara	1995–2000 (6 series)
Jack	Edward Scott	1995–99 (5 series)
Cher Coates	Jody Baldwin	1996–2000; 2003
Harry Mitcham	Leah Jones	1996–2000 (5 series)
Mat	Sajid Varda	1996 (1 series)
Ben Carter	Andrew Hayden-Smith	1996–2003 (8 series)
Philip	Philip Miller	1996–97 (2 series)
Rob	Gavin Makel	1996–99 (4 series)
Nat Guinane	Alexa Gibb	1997–2001 (5 series)
Ollie Guinane	Louis Watson	1997–2001 (5 series)
Emma Miller	Holly Matthews	1997–2003 (7 series)
Jesus	Oz Reth	1997–2000 (4 series)
Leanne	Vikki Spensley	1997 (1 series)
Barry	Steven Douglas	1998–2000 (3 series)
Jake Simpkins	Nick Figgis	1998–99 (2 series)
Laura McLaughlin	Louise Henderson	1998–2000; 2003–2004
Regina O'Hagan	Jade Turnbull	1998–2003; 2005
Greg Watson	Gary Crawford	1998–2003 (6 series)
Nikki Watson	Siobhan Hanratty	1998–2002 (5 series)
Bradley Clayton	Nic Nancarrow	1999–2005 (7 series)
Claire Rivers	Victoria Hawkins	1999–03 (5 series)
Stewart "Stumpy" McLaughlin	Paul Meynell	1999–2006*
Liam	Pete Hepple	1999–2001 (3 series)
Matt	Adam Henderson-Scott	1999–2003 (5 series)
Bill Dakin	Adam Ironside	2000–05 (6 series)
Joe Dakin	Chris Beattie	2000–02 (3 series)
Adam Brett	Alex Beebe	2000–05 (6 series)
Luke Brett	Dominic Beebe	2000–05 (6 series)
Paul Johnson	Patrice Etienne	2000–03 (4 series)
Eve Johnson	Rory Lewis	2000–06*
Jodie Reece	Sophie Blench	2001–02 (2 series)
Leanne Henderson	Rachael Lee	2001–04 (4 series)
Stella Reece	Emma Littlewood	2001–03 (3 series)
Sarah Young	Sammy T Dobson	2001–05 (5 series)
Robert Hunter	Tom Graham	2002–06*
Beth McGregor	Jennifer Wilson	2001-03
Jamie Parker	Matthew Edgar	2002–06*
Anjali Rishan	Nisha Joshi	2002–04 (3 series)
Hayley Robinson	Heather Garrett	2002–06*
Mukasa	Simon Yugire	2002 (1 series)
Kate Best	Alex Gardner	2003–06*
Sadie Fox	Bridie Hales	2003–05 (3 series)
Spencer Murray	Leon Scott	2003–04 (2 series)
Mickey Murray	Daniel Waterston	2003–06*
Lucy Summerbee	Chelsea Halfpenny	2003–06*
Binnie	Jonny Ferguson	2003–06*
Flip	Ian Daniell	2003 (1 series)
Ben Brett	Adam Hopper/Luke Hopper	2004 (1 series)
Scott Jackson	Matthew Forster	2004–05 (2 series)
Zoe McCormack	Hannah Clementson	2004–06*
Kevin McLaughlin	Joe McCabe	2004–06*
Andrew "Spud" Tate	Jamie Tulip	2004–06*
Kylie Wylie	Gayna Millican	2004–06*
Danielle Blake	Chloe Stanley	2005–06*
Candice Marie Harper	Kate Heslop	2005–06*
Jessica Jones	Julianne Johnson	2005–06*
Charlotte Murray	Altea Claveras	2005–06*
Peter "Gadget" Tilbrook	Daniel Watson	2005–06*
Madelaine Watts	Anna Udall	2005 (1 series)
David	Oliver Walker	2005 (1 series)
Nathan	Adam Gibb	2005 (1 series)
Vicky Murray	Jo McGarry	2005 (1 series)
Jason Mason	Scott Turnbull	2006*
Toni Armitage	Hazel Pude	2006*
Jake Armitage	Cahyle Smith	2006*

* Indicates character was still in the show when it finished.

+ In the books that accompanied the series, Duncan's surname was listed as MacDonald until 1992, despite it being stated in the show in his first appearance (Series 1, Episode 3) that it is Sperring.

=== Parents ===
Although most of the action took place in the Grove, several characters' home lives and families were also shown. Some families remained in the show for many years. The house next door to the Grove was home to the Dobson family (1990–93) followed by the Turnbulls (1993–97) and then the Watsons (1998–2000). Other long-running families included the O'Hagans, the Carters and the various children at Lou Gallagher's foster home.

Character	Actor	Children	Duration
Michael Warner	Gordon Griffin	Julie	1989–90
Clare Warner	Jenny Twigge	Julie	1989–90
Jim Bell	Colin MacLaughlan	Donna	1989–91
Lisa Harris	Jayne MacKenzie	Donna	1989–91
Polly Bell	Denise Welch	Donna	1990–91
Alan Dobson	Tony Hodge	Nicola, Debbie and Jemma	1990–94
Kath Dobson	Lesley St John	Nicola, Debbie and Jemma	1990–94
Lou Gallagher	Anne Orwin	Foster mother to various characters	1990-2006
Jack Hardy	Alan Renwick	Winston and Barney	1990, 1992–93, 1995
Gerry O'Hagan	Terry Joyce	Angel, Brigid, Teraise (and others not shown on screen)	1993–2001
Maeve O'Hagan	Patricia Maria Dunn	Angel, Brigid, Teraise (and others not shown on screen)	1993–95
Peter Turnbull	Gez Casey	Alfie, Anna and Flora	1993–97
Jean McKay	Patricia Jones	Alfie, Anna and Flora	1993–97
Tony McKay	John Rogers	Flora	1994–97
Gloria Caseley	Libby Davison	Ed	1995–96
Carl Carter	John Bowler (1996); David Tarkenter (2002–2003)	Terry, Ben and Stella	1996, 2002–2003
Karen's Mam	Mary Pickin	Karen	

== See also ==
- CBBC
- Grange Hill
- Children's Ward
