= Big World Cafe =

British music show on Channel 4

- Country of origin: United Kingdom

Production
- Producer: Andrea Wonfor

Original release
- Network: Channel 4
- Release: 1989

Big World Café is a music show on British television. Broadcast on Channel 4 in 1989, it was presented by Mariella Frostrup, Eagle Eye Cherry and Jazzie B.

It was produced by Andrea Wonfor, who had previously worked on The Tube.

During the programme's second series, Andy Kershaw was recruited to report on world music.

Artists who appeared on the show included Les Négresses Vertes, New Order, Prefab Sprout, They Might Be Giants and Wet Wet Wet.
