= Adele Rose =

British writer (1933–2020)

Adele Rose (8 December 1933 – 28 December 2020) was an English television writer. She was the longest-serving scriptwriter for the soap opera Coronation Street, writing 457 scripts over a period of 37 years from 1961, and was the first woman to write for the show. She also originated the series Byker Grove (1989–2006), aimed at teenagers.

== Biography ==
Rose was born in Salford, and raised in a Jewish family. Her parents were Clara (née Simons) and Sydney Rose, who was a manager at Great Universal Stores, the family's mail-order business. Adele initially worked as a secretary at Granada Television in the promotions department, which prepared links for the station's continuity announcers to read. Jack Rosenthal, a former colleague in the department who had already collaborated with her, suggested she should write for Coronation Street. After noticing the programme lacked any female writers, Rose contacted Coronation Street's script editor Harry Kershaw, suggesting she should join the programme's writing team. Accepted, she debuted on episode 40, screened in May 1961. Rosenthal encouraged Rose by co-writing some episodes with her.

Rose became the Street's longest-serving contributor, as well as the show's first female writer. She wrote 457 scripts for the soap opera between 1961 and 1998. Only Peter Whalley (601 scripts over 35 years) has written more episodes. ITV's John Whiston credits her with writing some of the show's "most memorable episodes", describing her as "particularly adept at giving voice to some of Corrie's classic fearless female characters". According to her husband, Peter Chadwick, "She loved writing the battle-axes in Coronation Street." Executive producer Brian Park dropped her from the programme's contributors in 1998; Granada gave her a farewell boardroom dinner.

Rose was commissioned by Andrea Wonfor to create a series set in a youth club to be produced by the independent company Zenith North for the BBC. The result was the teen drama series Byker Grove which began in 1989. Set in Newcastle upon Tyne, she wrote the first three series. The show launched the careers of Ant & Dec, who played the friends PJ and Duncan, as well as Donna Air and Jill Halfpenny. It had 5 million viewers in the 1990s and lasted for 17 years, with Rose continuing to be credited throughout. Byker Grove was included by The Guardian in a 2018 list of "definitive" shows for teenagers; Iman Amrani describes it as "the north's answer to Grange Hill", praising its "gritty" writing, which took on difficult topics such as sexual relationships (including those which were same sex) and foster care. Rose also originated two earlier series: Girls About Town, a feminist situation comedy which ran to three series from 1969 to 1971, and Second Chance, a drama series about divorce, partly drawn from her own experiences, which screened in 1981.

In the 1980s, she also wrote for the soap Crossroads, using the pen name Kay Stephens. Her other credits include episodes of the police series Z-Cars and nursing drama Angels for the BBC, as well as for several shows for ITV, including the comedies Bless This House and Robin's Nest, and the dramas Heartbeat, Rooms, Within These Walls and the sitcom The Dustbinmen. She also wrote a column in the TV Times magazine. She retired from script-writing in 2000.

=== Recognition ===
In 1993, Rose received a BAFTA Award for screenwriting, for her work on Coronation Street. She also received several Writers' Guild Awards for her work on the series, including the 1992 award for Original Drama Series, which she was jointly awarded with the Coronation Street writing team.

== Personal life and death ==
Rose's first marriage ended in divorce. After her retirement in 2000, she moved to the Cotswolds with her long-term partner, Peter Chadwick, a newspaper journalist. They married in around the year 2010. She had two children from an earlier marriage.

Rose died of pneumonia on 28 December 2020, at the age of 87. The second episode of Coronation Street aired on 8 January 2021 was dedicated to her.
