= Francoise Boufhal =

English actor and model (born 1988)

- Born: Françoise Boufhal; 18 December 1988 (age 37); Hexham, Northumberland, England
- Occupations: Model; actress; presenter
- Modeling information
- Height: 5 ft 6 in (1.68 m)
- Hair color: Brown
- Eye color: Brown

Francoise Boufhal (born 18 December 1988) is an English model, actress and presenter.

== Early life ==
Born Françoise Boufhal on 18 December 1988 in Hexham, Northumberland, England, Boufhal grew up and spent most of her childhood in Stocksfield and attended Broomley First school before moving into Newcastle Upon Tyne. She attended Ponteland Middle school.

== Acting ==
Boufhal's acting career began at the age of 11 when she joined The Live Theatre Company, a theatrical youth theatre based in Newcastle made famous by Robson Green. Boufhal's first major role was in the hit children's BBC 1 show Byker Grove, where she played Ellie Baines, Stumpy's girlfriend. Boufhal auditioned several times for a role in the show but was deemed 'too sexy', until eventually a part was made for her. Boufhal also appeared in the pilot for GRUBBS, a children's cookery program scheduled to be regularly on the Discovery Kids channel.

== Modelling ==
At 5 feet 6 inches (1.68 m), and having a 28H chest, Boufhal was rejected by fashion houses for being too small and having an 'unusual' figure'.

Boufhal has appeared in Nuts as "Nuts Next Top Model", Zoo, and was Maxim's April 2009 cover girl.

FHM claimed Boufhal was "one to watch" of 2011, by popular demand was featured on the cover followed up with a spread.

Boufhal is featured in a non-pictorial article in the June 2010 issue of Playboy United States.

== Presenting ==
In April 2009, Rio Ferdinand signed Boufhal up to his digital magazine #5 as his co-presenter.

In May 2010 she made her debut on MTV interviewing celebrities and super car collectors for the London Motor Museum.

Boufhal was the weekly "Bloke Counsellor" for Maxim UK, involving a heavy online presence.
