= Malcolm Collins =

Malcom Collins may refer to:

- Malcolm Collins (boxer), Welsh boxer
- Simone and Malcolm Collins, natalism activists
- Billy Fane, born Malcolm Collins, English actor and comedian
- Malcolm Collins, defendant and appellant in People v. Collins, a 1968 American robbery trial
