= Breeze block (disambiguation) =

A breeze block is a concrete block used in construction.

Breeze block may also refer to:

- Breeze Block (TV series), a British TV series
- Breezeblocks (song), by Alt-J
- The Breezeblock, a music programme on BBC radio
