= Rudy Loewe =

British visual artist (born 1987)

- Born: 1987 (age 38–39)
- Education: Konstfack, University of the Arts London
- Known for: Mural in Brixton tube station

Rudy Loewe (born 1987) is an artist who works with painting, drawing, and sculpture. Their work explores black histories, queering the archive, and social politics. Their mural The Congregation was unveiled at Brixton Underground station in south London in 2025, and their installation Intimacies of Care opened at the Wellcome Collection in north London in July 2026.

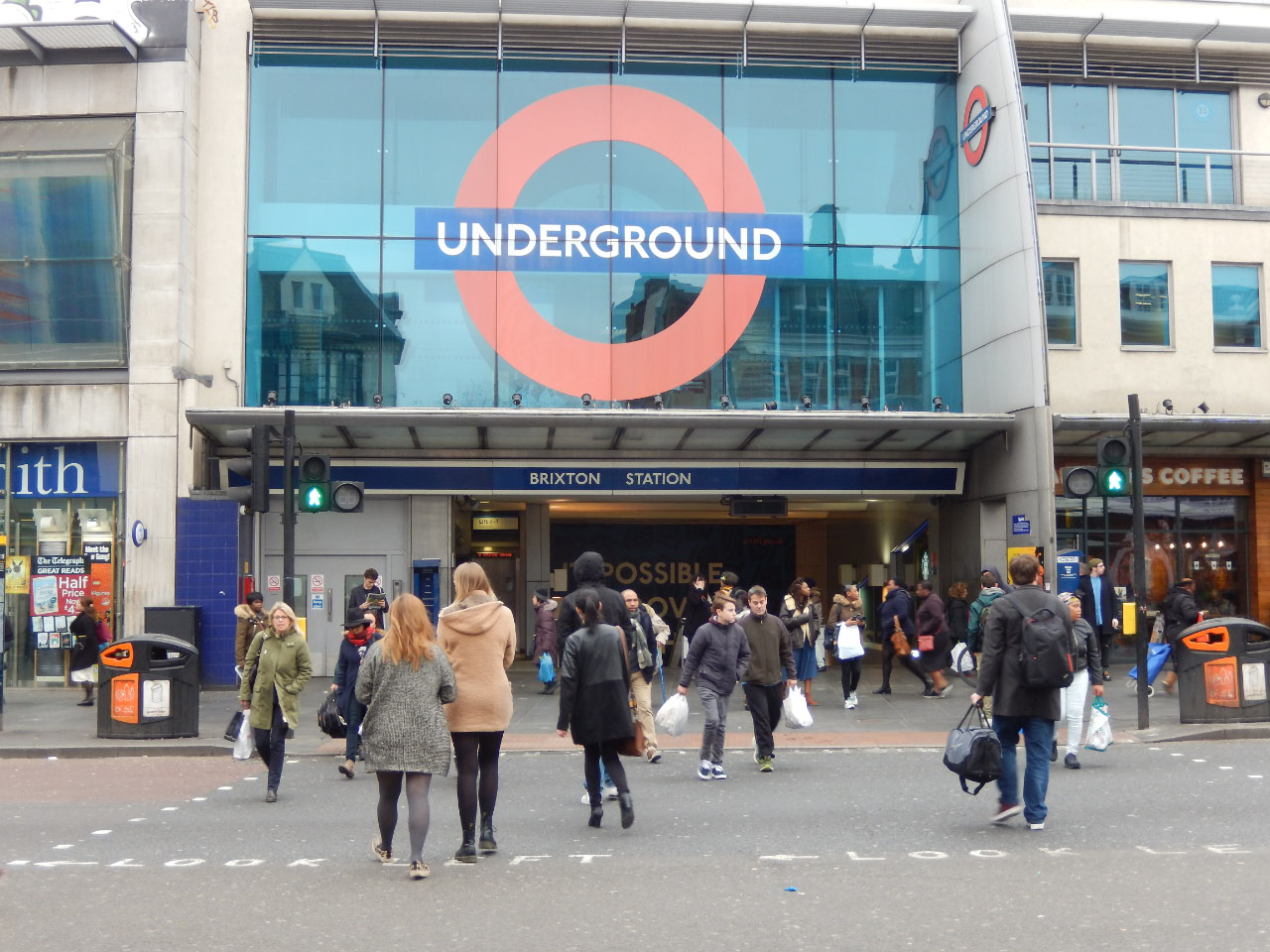
Brixton Underground Station, where Loewe made The Congregation.

== Education ==
Loewe studied for an MFA at Konstfack, and a PhD at University of the Arts London.

== Work ==
Loewe and collaborator Jacob V Joyce were the Families Artists in Residence in 2020–2021 at the Serpentine Galleries, London, producing educational packs for young audiences to explore the gallery.

Loewe was commissioned to create a new mural artwork for Brixton Underground station by Transport for London. The Congregation launched on 20 November 2025 and features people and places of Brixton, including: representatives of the "Windrush Generation"; lesbian-run sound system SisterMatic; activist Marcia Rigg, sister of Sean Rigg; the 121 Centre on Railton Road, a squat that was once home to Olive Morris; the brutalist Southwyck House; and Pearl Alcock’s Railton Road gay bar; sites associated with the 1981 Brixton uprising; HM Prison Brixton; Electric Avenue; and Windrush Square.

Loewe's multi-media installation Intimacies of Care – Spaces of Grief and Possibility opened at the Wellcome Collection on 9 July 2026. The work reflects on the experiences of Black people in the UK's mental health care system, with the work drawing upon archive sources and co-produced with groups ADHD Babes, the Black Trans Foundation, and Black and Neurodiverse.

=== Exhibitions ===
Loewe featured in the Liverpool Biennial 2023.
