= YHA =

YHA may refer to:

== Arts and entertainment ==
- Young Hollywood Awards
- Young Heart Attack, a Texan rock band

== Organisations ==
- YHA Australia
- Youth Hostels Association (England & Wales)
- Youth Hostel Association of New Zealand
- York Housing Association, England
- Yorkshire Hockey Association, England

== Places ==
- Port Hope Simpson Airport, Canada (IATA code: YHA)
