= The Tube (1982 TV series) =

British music television programme

- Genre: Music
- Directed by: Gavin Taylor; Bernard Preston
- Presented by: Jools Holland; Paula Yates; Leslie Ash; Muriel Gray; Gary James; Michel Cremona; Felix Howard; Nick Laird-Clowes; Mike Everitt; Tony Fletcher; Margi Clarke
- Theme music composer: Jan Hammer & Jeff Beck (Series 1–2); Jeff Beck & Trevor Horn (Series 3–4); Andrew Poppy (Series 5)
- Country of origin: United Kingdom
- Original language: English
- No. of series: 5
- No. of episodes: 121

Production
- Executive producers: Malcolm Gerrie; Andrea Wonfor; Crispin Evans
- Producers: Malcolm Gerrie; Paul Corley; John Gwyn
- Running time: 90 minutes (inc. adverts)
- Production company: Tyne Tees Television

Original release
- Network: Channel 4
- Release: 5 November 1982 – 24 April 1987

The Tube is a British music television programme, which ran for five series, from 5 November 1982 to 24 April 1987. It was filmed in Newcastle upon Tyne and produced for Channel 4 by Tyne Tees Television, which had previously produced the similar music show Alright Now and the music-oriented youth show Check it Out for ITV; production of the latter ended in favour of The Tube.

The Tube was presented live by hosts including Jools Holland, Paula Yates, Leslie Ash, Muriel Gray, Gary James, Mark Miwurdz (Mark Hurst), Michel Cremona, Felix Howard, Tony Fletcher, Nick Laird-Clowes and Mike Everitt. The show was directed by Gavin Taylor; Geoff Wonfor directed some of the insert videos along with other staff programme director of Tyne Tees Television Martin Cairns. Many other specials were made, including one for the eve of the millennium.

The programme's production team also produced a number of concert films and specials, including Queen's 1986 Wembley Stadium concert which was later released as Queen at Wembley.

The brand name was relaunched by Channel 4 as an online radio station in November 2006.

== Showcase for contemporary bands ==
The Tube was a showcase for many emerging 1980s bands. Sunderland band the Toy Dolls were the first band to play live on The Tube.

The Tube was an important outlet for the performers. For the Proclaimers, performing "Letter from America" on The Tube was instrumental in helping the Scottish duo to their first top ten UK hit; it was also responsible for introducing Frankie Goes to Hollywood to their record label ZTT and its co-owner, and their producer Trevor Horn.

In addition to being the launchpad for new and upcoming performers, The Tube became known for its high-profile music performance 'scoops' from established world class musicians such as U2 live at Red Rocks, Madonna, Ozzy Osbourne, Robert Plant, Tina Turner, Bo Diddley, Dire Straits and ZZ Top. The show was also fortunate to persuade Ringo Starr to give one of the first post-Beatles interviews in an extended article on his work with Marc Bolan and T. Rex, filmed at his then (and previously John Lennon's) house, Tittenhurst Park. Pink Floyd guitarist David Gilmour appeared on an episode of the second series, recorded on 30th March 1984 as part of his first solo tour. It was during the 50th show in November 1984 that Bob Geldof allegedly ran into Midge Ure and suggested the idea of a fund-raising single for the Christmas market to help the Ethiopian famine, the project that would become Band Aid and later Live Aid.

The Jam performed on the first edition of the show in 1982, it was their last live TV appearance together before they split up at the end of the year.

Dire Straits featured prominently in the fourth series, during which time they were promoting their 1985 album Brothers in Arms. The band performed and were interviewed in Israel on the 6 December 1985 episode, followed by a live performance on the 20 December show. The first episode of 1986 (transmitted on 3 January) was a one off special in which Dire Straits performed excerpts from their 10 July 1985 concert at Wembley Arena in London, one of 13 consecutive concerts during their 1985–1986 Brothers in Arms world tour.

Half Man Half Biscuit famously turned down the chance to appear on the show, as Tranmere Rovers were playing that night, even though Channel Four offered to fly them by helicopter to the game.

== Format ==
The cornerstone of the shows was the live performances from three or four bands each week. In an era where most music TV shows featured non-stop miming, the fully live sets by the guest artists were innovative (but the sound mix was often very poor, with a curious quality that made it sound like everything had been 'phased'). The programme would start with a 45-minute magazine section consisting of interviews, fashion items and comedy appearances by a wide range of alternative artistes such as Frank Sidebottom, Alexei Sayle, Vic Reeves (before his association with Bob Mortimer), Foffo Spearjig and French & Saunders.

The show usually featured four or five band appearances per week, with one main extended session to close. The format of the show was extended following Series 1 with a number of special events - most notably A Midsummer Night's Tube (1984), a 5-hour version broadcast live from the Tyne Tees studios, the pub across the road from the studios and The Hoppings annual fair in Newcastle. This ground breaking broadcast was, at the time, the longest continuous live music show in television history and received much critical and technical acclaim.

== Production ==
The main presenters were supported, for the first two series, by five newcomers who were picked following a nationally advertised competition: these were Muriel Gray, Gary James, Nick Laird-Clowes, Michel Cremona and Mike Everitt. The supporting presenters took turns to co-present. Sheffield-born comedian Mark Hurst was also present during the first two series delivering comic monologues in the guise of performance poet Mark Miwurdz. Yates was absent throughout the second series as she was on maternity leave, and was replaced by Leslie Ash. Ash, however, was hospitalised before the second episode, and was replaced by Tony Fletcher. When Ash returned, Fletcher was also retained for the remainder of the second series, but both left on Yates' return.

Studio 5 was also used to produce a spin-off show called TX45. This show ran for two series hosted by Chris Cowey and produced by Jeff Brown and featured local bands such as The Kane Gang, Caught in the Act, Secret Sam and President. The programme's theme music, the instrumental "TX45", was by Sophie and Peter Johnston, based on the song of theirs, "Some Sunny Day". A video clip of them performing it is available.

Many stars drank in the neighbouring pub The Egypt Cottage, using it as a green room. Jools Holland said "A legendary amount of things happened in the Egypt Cottage, and the Rose and Crown when it was on the other side of the road. Everyone – the likes of Miles Davis, Paul McCartney – who came up for The Tube will have sat in that pub." The pub was demolished in 2009.

The programme team also produced major concert productions outside of The Tube studio and format. In 1983, Gavin Taylor was commissioned to film U2 at Red Rocks Amphitheatre in Colorado, with producer Malcolm Gerrie serving as production associate. Although the concert was intended for broadcast on The Tube, a dispute with television trade unions resulted in only around 15 minutes being shown; the footage was subsequently released as U2 Live at Red Rocks: Under A Blood Red Sky. In 1986 Taylor and The Tube's production team also filmed Queen's concert at Wembley Stadium, which was broadcast by Channel 4 as The Tube special Queen: Real Magic, and later released as Queen at Wembley.

Between 1986 and 1987, the series had a summer replacement named Wired which lasted two series.

For the last episode of the show, The Tube had commissioned Swans to produce a music video for "New Mind" off the album Children of God. The show used the 3:59 cut single version of the song.

== Demise ==
On 16 January 1987, during the fifth series, Jools Holland used the phrase "be there or be ungroovy fuckers" during a live trailer for the show. The incident caused a national scandal, as the trailer was transmitted on ITV at 5:15pm (during peak children's viewing time) and the show was taken off air for three weeks as a result. Holland was reprimanded by Channel 4, as he had also previously sworn on the live show itself. The show's producer, Malcolm Gerrie, and Tyne Tees' Director of Programmes, Andrea Wonfor, announced their resignations in March. They cited as reasons for doing so a mixture of internal bickering, political pressure and "stifling bureaucracy and heavy-handed moralism".

A further series was never commissioned. Some people close to the show had said Holland's swearing was seen as a convenient excuse for ending the show. The presenters' live interviews and filmed magazine items were nervously watched by the show's producers and editors as well as Channel 4 executives, especially when certain pop stars and celebrities not known for their shy and retiring nature were being featured. It was this that gave the show the curious feeling of 'anything might happen' that actually made it the success it was.

For Holland, Yates and Gray it was the launch pad for successful careers in television.

In 1999, The Tube was brought back for a one-off live special on Sky1 entitled "The Apocalypse Tube". Hosted by BBC Radio 1's Chris Moyles and Donna Air, the show came live again from Studio 5 at Tyne Tees and the bar of the Egypt Cottage next door.

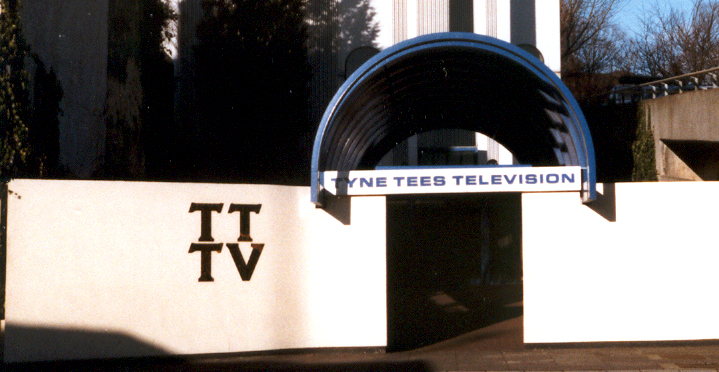
'The Tube' took its name from the plastic-roofed structure that linked Tyne Tees Studio 5 to the street. This has now been demolished.

On 2 July 2005, Tyne Tees Television moved from its Television Centre studios on Newcastle Quayside. In July 2006, Studio 5 of the TTTV City Road site was leased by an evangelical money church, and the whole complex was demolished in 2010. The famous Tube neon sign was bought at auction by Tyne and Wear Museums for a future display at the Discovery Museum in Newcastle's Blandford Square.

== Radio revival ==
In November 2006, the brand was revived as a radio show, also entitled The Tube for Channel 4 Radio. Presenters Konnie Huq, Alex James and Tony Wilson hosted the main show (The Tube) and filler show (Mind The Gap).

== Available on the Internet ==
In July 2008 ITN (rights holder for The Tube) signed a deal with MUZU TV to make The Tube available online.

== Discography ==
- Tube – Various Artists, K-Tel, 1984
- The Very Best of The Tube – Various Artists, Universal Records, 4 November 2002

== Transmissions ==
Series	Start date	End date	Episodes
1	5 November 1982	18 March 1983	20
2	28 October 1983	13 April 1984	25
3	5 October 1984	29 March 1985	26
4	11 October 1985	4 April 1986	26
5	31 October 1986	24 April 1987	24
