= Badger (TV series) =

1999 British TV series

- Genre: Crime drama
- Created by: Kieran Prendiville
- Written by: David Ashton; Kieran Prendiville; Colin MacDonald; Nicholas Hicks-Beach
- Directed by: Paul Harrison; Martyn Friend; Keith Washington; Tom Clegg
- Starring: Jerome Flynn; Adrian Bower; Kevin Doyle; Rebecca Lacey; Phillippa Wilson; Scott Karalius; Alison Mac; Jayne MacKenzie
- Composer: Nigel Hess
- Country of origin: United Kingdom
- Original language: English
- No. of series: 2
- No. of episodes: 13

Production
- Executive producers: Philip Clarke; Lawrence Bowen
- Producers: Murray Ferguson; Ann Tricklebank
- Production locations: Northumberland, England
- Cinematography: Doug Hallows
- Editor: John MacDonnell
- Running time: 50 minutes
- Production company: Feelgood Films

Original release
- Network: BBC One
- Release: 11 July 1999 – 1 September 2000

Badger is a British television police procedural drama series, broadcast between 11 July 1999 and 1 September 2000. Produced by Feelgood Films, and broadcast on BBC One, a total of thirteen episodes were broadcast over the course of two series. The series stars Jerome Flynn as lead character Tom McCabe, a police wildlife liaison officer, who is tasked with fighting wildlife crime in his home county of Northumberland. The series was created by Ballykissangel creator Kieran Prendiville, and the character of McCabe was based upon a close associate of Prendiville, Paul Henery, who was himself a police wildlife liaison officer at the time of recording.

In April 2000, Craster became the set for the second series, with many of the local buildings taking on new identities, and the Harbour Cottage being transformed into a local jail, complete with bars across the window. The yard was also used as the back of the police station. Flynn said of the series; "I've always felt passionate about animals, so loved the script when it was sent to me. I also have family and friends in Northumberland and have a particular affinity with the North East." Regarding Henery, Flynn said; "Paul was a large inspiration because he was the real thing. I connected with him right away, understood what's driving him to do the job. It's not really police work, it's a passion with him, trying to keep the animals wild ... he's just passionate about preventing needless suffering." An official book based on the series was issued by BBC Books on 6 July 2000. Notably, the series has never been released on DVD.

== Cast ==
- Jerome Flynn as DC Tom McCabe
- Adrian Bower as DC Jim Cassidy
- Kevin Doyle as DI David Armitage
- Rebecca Lacey as Claire Armitage
- Phillippa Wilson as Steph Allen
- Scott Karalius as Liam Allen
- Alison Mac as Wilf McCabe
- Jayne MacKenzie as Julia
- Conor Mullen as Ralph Allen
- Brendan P. Healy as Ray
- Terry Joyce as Sgt. Deakin
- Michael Wardle as Martin

== Episodes ==
=== Series 1 (1999) ===
No.	Title	Directed by	Written by	British air date	UK viewers (million)
1	"It's a Jungle Out There"	Paul Harrison	Kieran Prendiville	11 July 1999	7.12
McCabe and Steph raid a council house whether the tenant and his wife are holding a nine-foot alligator called Patsy. McCabe also investigates a case of venison poaching, and RSPB Investigations Officer Claire Armitage, who is also married to McCabe's boss, pursues a birds' egg raider. The cases coincide when the 'egger' is poisoned by the poached venison, exposing the poaching ring.
2	"Under My Skin"	Paul Harrison	Nicholas Hicks-Beach	18 July 1999	5.38
While investigating a series of burglaries, McCabe and Cassidy discover a recently stuffed puma, a protected animal, among the hoard of antique booty in criminal's cache. Meanwhile, Claire is on the trail of a gunman who wounded a rare red kite. The kite is treated at Steph's wildlife sanctuary and, while visiting Steph, McCabe captures the gunman, who is trying to retrieve his prey.
3	"The World According to Carp"	Paul Harrison	Kieran Prendiville	25 July 1999	5.78
While investigating a shipment of counterfeit money, McCabe and Cassidy keep watch on Frankie Moncur, an arrogant local villain who also runs an apparently respectable restaurant. Moncur is aware of their surveillance, and constantly mocks their efforts. Meanwhile, McCabe is excited when he realises that otters are moving back into local water, but infuriated when he finds a dead one in a local fishing lake.
4	"Setts, Lies and Videotape"	Martyn Friend	David Ashton	1 August 1999	N/A
Chris and Jackie Mason, two teenage hoodlums, terrorise a council estate by running a protection racket which preys on the local traders, mocking the police when they try to intervene. But when they decide to step into the big time by running a badger bait in a wharfside warehouse, they incur McCabe's wrath.
5	"Rhino and Chips"	Martyn Friend	Kieran Prendiville	8 August 1999	6.76
Following a seizure of over two million pounds' worth of rhino horn in a London lock-up, McCabe is warned by a friend in the Customs service, who knows that some was missed, to look out for signs of the rhino horn in a Chinese medicine market in the Northumberland area. At first, his heavy-handedness alienates Susan Chang, a Chinese shopkeeper, but she later agrees to help him.
6	"Low Fidelity"	Martyn Friend	Kieran Prendiville	15 August 1999	N/A
Unintentionally, McCabe causes trouble in a gamekeeper's home when he gives a lecture to a school class and claims that some local gamekeepers are killing rare birds of prey on the moors. When a rare hen harrier is actually killed on the moor, the locals and the school pupils, blame Dominic McGuire, the local gamekeeper, unaware that it was his ambitious younger deputy who was responsible.

=== Series 2 (2000) ===
No.	Title	Directed by	Written by	British air date
1	"Troubled Waters"	Keith Washington	John Martin	16 July 2000
Zelenka, a local factory, is suspected of polluting the environment and harming the nearby wildlife. But, just as McCabe is beginning to gather proof of their involvement a bomb goes off, destroying all the evidence against them. McCabe and Cassidy try to track down the culprit of the bombing with the assistance of Annabel Staunton from the CPS.
2	"The Price of a Daughter"	Tom Clegg	John Martin	23 July 2000
A dead badger is dumped into McCabe's now unoccupied badger run and, together with other clues, leads McCabe and Cassidy to believe that Wilf may be in danger. This fear is confirmed when Wilf disappears, kidnapped by a man named Vic Kerrigan, who blames McCabe for the death of his own daughter, who was crippled during a police chase and has since died of pneumonia.
3	"Blood Ties"	Tom Clegg	Colin MacDonald	4 August 2000
A violent gang are rustling hill sheep and slaughtering them to sell the meat on the clandestine market. McCabe tries to track down the rustlers by hiding himself in their van during their next raid, and guiding the police task force to the illegal slaughterhouse by radio. Meanwhile, a desperate boy brings Steph a wounded racehorse to treat.
4	"Cock o' the Walk"	Tom Clegg	Sam Lawrence	11 August 2000
A shepherd's daughter, playing in a ruined pele tower on the moors, is poisoned by a mystery liquid in a lemonade bottle. The bottle is discovered to have been left behind by a cock-fighting ring who use the tower for their illegal meetings. Whilst investigating the poisoning, McCabe and Cassidy are also trying to track down some specialist burglars, and are antagonised by the arrogant attitude of some of the victims.
5	"Predators"	Tom Clegg	John Martin	18 August 2000
Harrington, the owner of a private collection of dangerous wild animals, reports that his animals – an iguana, a racoon, two wolves and a leopard – have all been released into the countryside. McCabe brings in a professional big-game hunter and, during their mutual pursuit of the animals, learns to respect the man's expertise.
6	"The Last Flight"	Paul Harrison	Nicholas Hicks-Beach	25 August 2000
Bronco Sullivan, a violent criminal who has been sent to prison after stabbing Cassidy, breaks out to recover his stashed loot and see his daughter. McCabe and Cassidy keep watch on his house but are distracted by a mysterious teenage boy, who brings them an injured bird, and Sullivan's daughter, who tries to throw them off the scent.
7	"Finders Keepers"	Keith Washington	Nicholas Hicks-Beach	1 September 2000
When Boyd, a local fisherman, is found dead after a storm around the Farne Islands, his severe head wounds make the police suspicious. His boat is missing, but his lobster gear is still in his shed and his wife obviously has something to hide. Then his drinking mate, an old beachcomber called Reuben, devoted both to the seals and the islands, goes missing, and McCabe and Cassidy are called in to investigate what looks like a murder.
