= Point Break (group) =

British pop group

- Origin: United Kingdom
- Genre: Pop
- Instrument: Vocals
- Years active: 1999-2000
- Label: Warner Bros.
- Past members: Brett Adams; Declan Bennett; David Oliver; Dustin Strong; George Trotter; Jonathan Newman

Point Break were a British pop group, formed and managed by Danielle Barnett and signed to WEA, who found brief success between 1999 and 2000.

Brett Adams and David Oliver first started out with George Trotter as a group called Aurora and performed in local schools and clubs in England. They changed their name to Point Break named after the 1991 crime action film of the same name, when they clinched a record deal with Warner Music.

Launched as a new boy band in 1999, the group featured Brett Adams and David "Ollie" Oliver, who had both acted in the television series Byker Grove, and Declan Bennett joined when original member Jon had to quit due to illness. Within a year, they clocked up five UK hit singles and an album. Other members included American Dustin Strong who joined the group as a singer and songwriter and toured live with Point Break before the group disbanded.

== Discography ==
=== Albums ===
Title	Album details	Peak chart positions		
Title	Album details	UK	FIN	JPN
Apocadelic	Released: 7 August 2000; Label: Eternal Records; Formats: CD	21	35	83

=== Singles ===
Year	Title	Peak chart positions			Album
Year	Title	UK	AUS	JPN	Album
1999	"Do We Rock?"	29	—	7	Apocadelic
2000	"Stand Tough"	7	49	10	Apocadelic
2000	"Freakytime"	13	—	11	Apocadelic
2000	"You"	14	—	—	Apocadelic
2000	"What About Us?"	24	—	—	Apocadelic
