= Lyndyann Barrass =

English actress (born 1976)

- Born: 1975 (age 50–51); Sunderland, England
- Occupation: Actress
- Years active: 1989–present
- Television: Byker Grove

Lyndyann Barrass (born 1975 in Sunderland, England) is an English actress best known for playing Kirsty "Spuggie" Campbell in the BBC television series Byker Grove.

== Career ==
Lyndyann Barrass began her career playing Kirsty "Spuggie" Campbell, a character who appears in the CBBC television series Byker Grove. The character, appearing from 1989 to 1992, became a fan favourite and one of the most recognisable figures on British children's television.

The character "Spuggie" became one of the most well known characters on British TV. Spuggie's name became widely associated with the show, with people referencing the character whenever Byker Grove or Newcastle were mentioned.

Following her time on Byker Grove, Barrass continued to perform in various theatre productions across the UK. She has also worked part-time at a call centre in Sunderland.

== Personal life ==
After leaving Byker Grove in 1993, Barrass studied performing arts at Sunderland College. However, she struggled to find acting work due to typecasting. At 21, she joined a band called Angel, but the group disbanded after a year.

In an incident three years later, Barrass was attacked by three strangers who recognised her as Spuggie. Though she was not seriously injured, the experience led her to quit show business temporarily.

In recent years, she has returned to acting and continues to appear in theatre and on British television as a guest on various shows.

== Filmography ==
Year	Title	Role	Notes
2021	Pointless Celebrities	Self	Contestant
2018	Top of the Box	Self	Children's TV Correspondent
2014	Celebrity Juice	Self	Guest
2011	This Morning	Self	Guest
2008	The Comedy Map of Britain	Self	Guest
1997	King Leek	Laura	Main Role
1993	Harry	Pauline	Guest role (1 episodes)
1992	Going Live!	Self	Guest
1989–1992	Byker Grove	Spuggie	Main Role
