= Breeze Block (TV series) =

- Created by: Ian Pattison
- Starring: Tim Healy; Su Elliot; David Nellist; Alison Mac; Craig Heaney; Berwick Kaler; Mark Benton; Dale Meeks; Jill Halfpenny; Ashley Jensen
- Country of origin: United Kingdom
- No. of seasons: 1
- No. of episodes: 6

Production
- Production locations: Byker, Newcastle upon Tyne

Original release
- Network: BBC Choice
- Release: 4 March – 8 April 2002

Breeze Block is a short-lived British TV series written by Ian Pattison which aired on BBC Choice in 2002.

== Synopsis ==
Ralph Breeze lives with his wife Iris and children Eric, Carol and Billy in the Byker Wall area of Newcastle upon Tyne. Ralph has lost his confidence after being made redundant and feels that he is a "stopped clock". As he tries to overcome his paralysis, his wife Iris flirts with his brother Tommy and Tommy flirts with Billy. Eric works as a window cleaner and Carol works for lecherous fishmonger Mr Shields. Billy, encouraged (and pimped) by Uncle Tommy, starts work as a gigolo but is rather unsuccessful as he falls in love with each of his clients.

Ralph attends assertiveness classes to help him overcome his condition and, although Iris is supportive, his children – particularly Eric – are pretty indifferent to the point of cruelty (all for comic effect).

== Cast ==
- Tim Healy – Ralph Breeze
- Su Elliot – Iris Breeze
- David Nellist – Eric Breeze
- Alison Mac – Carol Breeze
- Craig Heaney – Billy Breeze
- Berwick Kaler – Uncle Tommy
- Mark Benton – Mr. Shields
- Dale Meeks – Hips
- Jill Halfpenny – Gail
- Ashley Jensen – Leanne
- Barry King - singing builder

== Episodes ==
=== Episode 1 ===
Season 1, Episode 1: Angels
Original Air Date: 4 March 2002
Ralph has lost his eyes and, on being told by Iris that they are in his head where he left them, he realises that there is not as much to see as there used to be.

=== Episode 2 ===
Season 1, Episode 2: Higher
Original Air Date: 11 March 2002
Billy starts his career as a gigolo. Uncle Tommy introduces him to a neighbour with a shepherd fixation. Soon Billy is wearing a clothing range by One Man and His Dog to please his new lady friend.

=== Episode 3 ===
Season 1, Episode 3: Saturday, Sinday
Original Air Date: 18 March 2002
After a heavy night out, looking for a poke, Eric ends up in a fight. He does not realise until the next morning that he has been stabbed. Ralph is feeling anxious and has thrown off his blanket, which used to be used to calm down the budgie.

=== Episode 4 ===
Season 1, Episode 4: Kid
Original Air Date: 25 March 2002

=== Episode 5 ===
Season 1, Episode 5: Unspeakable
Original Air Date: 1 April 2002
Ralph gets caught sniffing a labourer's dungarees which were left hanging on a nail. When confessing to his family about his indiscretion, he reminisces about when he was a working man at the Swan Hunter shipyard, coming home every night with "sweat rings the size of dinner plates".

=== Episode 6 ===
Season 1, Episode 6: Wet
Original Air Date: 8 April 2002
Ralph gets a job collecting trolleys for a derisory wage. Carol goes on an unsatisfactory date with her old art teacher.
