= Cardinal Newman Catholic School and Community College =

St John Henry Newman Catholic School
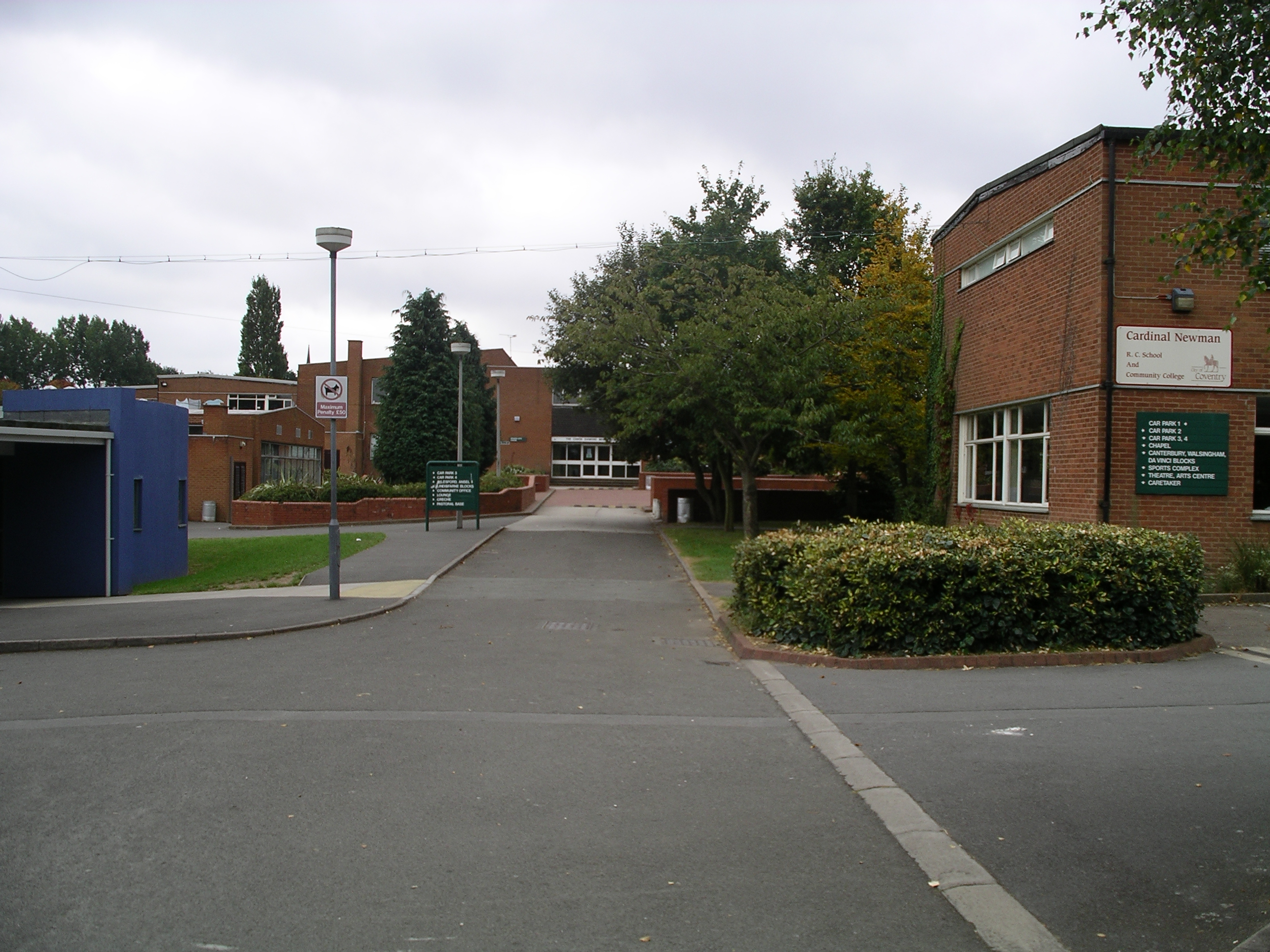

Location
- Sandpits Lane; Coventry, West Midlands, CV6 2FR; England; 52.4427°N 1.5362°W

Information
- Type: Academy
- Motto: "Knowledge through the light of faith"
- Religious affiliation: Roman Catholic
- Established: 1969
- Founder: Harry Mellon and Fr Canon
- Local authority: Coventry City Council
- Trust: Holy Cross Catholic Multi Academy Company
- Department for Education URN: 147346 Tables
- Ofsted: Reports
- Chair of Governors: Theresa Boland
- Head teacher: Emma O'Connor
- Gender: Coeducational
- Age: 11 to 19
- Enrolment: 1293 (as of September 2015)
- Website: http://www.cncs.school

St John Henry Newman Catholic School is a coeducational Roman Catholic secondary school and sixth form located in the Keresley area of Coventry, West Midlands, England. It is part of the Holy Cross Catholic MAC (HCCMAC).

== Feeder primary schools ==
- Christ The King, Coundon
- Holy Family, Holbrooks
- St Augustine's, Radford
- St Elizabeth's, Foleshill
- St Osburg's, Coundon

== Notable former students ==
- Matt Taylor (b. 1976) – weather forecaster
- Declan Bennett (b. 1981) – singer and actor
- Michael Quirke (b. 1991) – semi-professional footballer, Coventry United F.C.
- Daniel Crowley (b. 1997) – professional footballer, Notts County F.C.
- Aaron Bowen (b. 1999) – English professional boxer
- Liam Watts, musician member of The Enemy
