= Declan Bennett =

English singer and actor (born 1981)

- Born: Declan William Bennett; 20 March 1981 (age 45); Coventry, West Midlands, England
- Other name: Sumladfromcov (2001–2006)
- Occupations: Singer–songwriter; actor
- Years active: 1996–present
- Spouse: Fra Fee (m. 2024)
- Musical career
- Instruments: Vocals; guitar; piano; flute
- Labels: Warner Music Group; Covboy Records
- Website: www.declanbennett.co.uk

Declan William Bennett (born 20 March 1981) is an English singer-songwriter, actor and playwright. He gained prominence as a member of the band Point Break, before going on to be a solo musician. He is known on screen for his roles as Charlie Cotton in the soap opera EastEnders and Jonathan Roberts in the ITV series The Long Call.

Bennett is a noted stage actor performing on Broadway in the musicals Rent and Moulin Rouge. He's also performed on various London stages in productions of Once in the original West End cast, Jesus Christ Superstar, Carousel, and Natasha, Pierre & The Great Comet of 1812.

== Early life and education ==
Bennett was born in Coventry and has an older brother Kieran. Like his EastEnders character, Bennett is of Irish descent; his mother Rose is from Westmeath, and his paternal grandparents are from Dublin and Wexford. Bennett attended Christ the King Primary School in Coundon and then Cardinal Newman Catholic School and Community College.

== Career ==
=== Early ventures ===
As a teenager, Bennett performed with the Belgrade Youth Theatre and the Coventry Youth Operetta Group (YOG) Coventry, including appearances in Willy Russell's Our Day Out in September 1996, and in Boy Band, which featured a number of his own compositions. He also performed with the National Youth Music Theatre, in The Kissing-Dance 1999.

=== Music ===
In May 1999, Bennett was one of nine teenagers chosen to sing live on the ITV morning TV show This Morning in a feature that put together a boy band. Following his appearance, he was contacted in the studio by another band, Point Break, which featured Brett Adams and David 'Ollie' Oliver from UK children's TV programme Byker Grove, who were signed to Warner Music, and who were looking for a new member. The band released five singles, four of which made the UK top 20, and an album, which was number one in three countries in South east Asia, including Japan, and made the UK top 40. Bennett left the band in December 2000.

In January 2005, Bennett released his first solo album under the pseudonym "Sumladfromcov" entitled The Painters Ball on his own record label, Covboy Records. This was followed by a limited-edition EP, The Kitchen, in May 2006.

Now performing as a singer-songwriter under his own name, Bennett released a five-track iTunes-only EP in March 2007 entitled 10 Nelson Road. His second full-length album, An Innocent Evening Of Drinking, was released on 14 April 2008. Therapy, an iTunes-only single packaged with two remixes – Olivia's Mix and New York Live Studio Mix – was released in the U.S. on 27 April 2009 and in the rest of the world on 23 March 2009.

On 31 January 2010, Bennett performed on the Grammy Awards with Green Day as a cast member of the rock opera American Idiot, which ran on Broadway from 20 April 2010 to 24 April 2011. Bennett was a member of the ensemble, understudying and performing the role of Will.

Bennett released the album record:BREAKUP on 25 April 2011 in New York. A live and acoustic version was released on Monday 19 August 2013.

=== Theatre ===
In January 2002, Bennett was given the part of Guru Dazzle in Boy George's West End show Taboo, which received four Olivier Award nominations and he later took over one of the lead roles, Billy, playing alongside Matt Lucas, Boy George, and Julian Clary among others until the show closed in London in April 2003.

Bennett also played the role of Billy in the UK tour of the show from December 2003 to 2004.

In September 2006, Bennett took over the role of Roger Davis in the American national tour of Broadway rock opera Rent. He completed a nine-month tour of the United States from September 2006 to May 2007. He reprised the role on Broadway from October 2007 until May 2008.

In 2013, Bennett premiered the romantic lead Guy in the West End production of Once opposite Zrinka Cvitešić as Girl at the Phoenix Theatre in London.

In March 2016, it was announced Bennett would star in the titular role of Jesus Christ Superstar at the Open Air Theatre Regents Park Open Air Theatre. He's reprised the role several times since then including in Tokyo, Japan in 2019 opposite Ramin Karimloo as Judas.

In 2019, he starred in The View UpStairs playing the role of Dale at the Soho Theatre, in London from 18 July to 24 August.

In June 2021 it was announced Declan Bennett would be starring as Billy Bigelow in the Regents Park Open Air Theatre summer production of Carousel. This acclaimed show ran from 31 July 2021 to 25 September 2021.

Bennett created the one-man show Boy Out the City. It had its work-in-progress showcase in early 2021 before premiering the full thing at the Westival Music + Arts Festival in Westport, Ireland that 24 October, followed by a London premiere at the Turbine Theatre on 9 November.

On 8 April 2022, it was announced Bennett would star as the Duke of Monroth in Moulin Rouge! on Broadway beginning on 10 May 2022, following Tam Mutu, at the Al Hirschfeld Theatre. He left the show in January 2023.

On 17 October 2024, it was announced Bennett would star as Pierre Bezukhov in Natasha, Pierre & The Great Comet of 1812 at Donmar Warehouse beginning 7 December 2024.

=== Television and film ===
After a number of small film and television roles, on 22 January 2014, it was announced Bennett would join the cast of EastEnders as Charlie Cotton, the long-lost grandson of Dot Branning (June Brown). EastEnders executive producer, Dominic Treadwell-Collins, questioned whether Charlie (named after Charlie Cotton) would be "kind" like his grandmother or "evil" like his father Nick Cotton (John Altman). Bennett first appeared on 10 March 2014. In 2015, it was revealed Bennett would exit the series. During his time, he had married Ronnie Mitchell (Samantha Womack), gotten in a car accident, had an affair with Ronnie's sister Roxy Mitchell (Rita Simons) and impersonated a cop.

On 5 April 2017, it was confirmed that Bennett would reprise his EastEnders role for the forthcoming season after months of speculation. His first episode back aired on 5 May 2017.

Bennett starred opposite Ben Aldridge in the 2021 adaptation of The Long Call on ITV and BritBox.

In 2026, he made a minor appearance in the science-fiction horror film Imposters, the directorial debut of Caleb Phillips.

== Personal life ==
Bennett is gay. He lived in New York City and London for a number of years before moving to rural Oxfordshire, where he currently lives with his husband, fellow actor and singer Fra Fee. Bennett and Fee married on 15 November 2024.

== Stage credits ==
Year	Title	Role	Theatre	Location
2002-2003	Taboo	Guru Dazzle	Leicester Square Theatre	Off-West End
2003-2004	Taboo	Billy	-	UK Tour
2006-2007	Rent	Roger Davis	-	US Tour
2007-2008	Rent	Roger Davis	Nederlander Theatre	Broadway
2009	American Idiot	Ensemble u/s Will u/s Rock & Roll Boyfriend	Berkeley Repertory Theatre	Berkeley, California
2010-2011	American Idiot	Ensemble u/s Will u/s Rock & Roll Boyfriend	St. James Theatre	Broadway
2013-2014	Once	Guy	Phoenix Theatre	West End
2016	Jesus Christ Superstar	Jesus Christ	Regent's Park Open Air Theatre	London
2017	Jesus Christ Superstar	Jesus Christ	Regent's Park Open Air Theatre	London
2019	Jesus Christ Superstar	Jesus Christ	Tokyu Theatre Orb	Tokyo
2020	Jesus Christ Superstar	Jesus Christ	Regent's Park Open Air Theatre	London
2021	Carousel	Billy Bigelow	Regent's Park Open Air Theatre	London
2022-2023	Moulin Rouge! The Musical	The Duke of Monroth	Al Hirschfeld Theatre	Broadway
2024-2025	Natasha, Pierre and the Great Comet of 1812	Pierre Bezukhov	Donmar Warehouse	Off-West End
2026	The Last Ship	Gideon Fletcher	-	International Tour
2026	The Last Ship	Gideon Fletcher	Metropolitan Opera House	Lincoln Center
2026	The Last Ship	Gideon Fletcher	Theatre Royal Drury Lane	West End

== Discography ==
With Point Break

Year	Title	Notes
1999	"Do We Rock"	Warner Music, single.
1999	"Stand Tough"	Warner Music, single.
2000	"Freaky Time"	Warner Music, single.
2000	"You"	Warner Music, single.
2000	Apocadelic	Warner Music, album.
2000	"What About Us"	Warner Music, single.

Solo releases

Year
Title
Notes
2005
The Painters Ball
Covboy Records, album. Released under the name Sumladfromcov, ref COVBCD01, on 24 January 2005.
2006
The Kitchen
Covboy Records, EP. Limited release under the name Sumladfromcov and sold at gigs and through the official website only.
2007
10 Nelson Road
Covboy Records, EP. Download-only release through iTunes on 5 March 2007.
2008
An Innocent Evening of Drinking
Covboy Records, album, ref COVBCD002. Released on 14 April 2008.
2009
"Therapy"
Covboy Records, single. Download-only release through iTunes on 23 March 2009.
2011

2013

record:BREAKUP

record:BREAKUP live & unplugged

Covboy Records, album, ref COVBCD003. Released on 25 April 2011.

Covboy Records, album ref COVBCD007. Released on 16 August 2013

2013
"Father Christmas Knows"
Covboy Records, single. Download-only release through bandcamp December 2013.
2018
Unsolicited Material:LA
Covboy Records, EP. Released on 27 July 2018.
