= York Housing Association =

York Housing Association is an independent, not for profit organisation founded in 1964. It provides a range of housing and support services to over 900 households and has over 660 tenancies in management in the Yorkshire and Humber region, with a current development programme of over £10m. Special emphasis is given to providing housing for single people (including students), people who need housing with support and older people. YHA works closely with a number of voluntary and statutory bodies to develop new housing schemes and to provide housing with care and support e.g. for people with mental health problems, young homeless people, people with learning disabilities etc.

YHA is registered as a limited company on charitable rules with the Registrar of Friendly Societies and registered by the Homes & Communities Agency.

It merged in 2022 with Leeds & Yorkshire Housing Association to form 54North Homes .
