= Top of the Box =

- Genre: Comedy; Documentary; Entertainment
- Directed by: Tim Hopewell; Jonathan Megson; John Piper; Zoë Thorman
- Presented by: Matthew Kelly
- Country of origin: United Kingdom
- No. of series: 1
- No. of episodes: 4

Production
- Executive producers: Pam Cavanagh; Kieron Collins; Damon Pattison
- Production location: Dock10 studios
- Camera setup: Single-camera
- Production company: BBC Studios

Original release
- Network: Channel 5
- Release: 20 May – 10 June 2018

Top of the Box is a British television series created by BBC Studios for Channel 5, who have re-titled the series under names such as Greatest TV Moments of the 1980s, Greatest TV Moments of the 1990s and TV Gold since is original transmission.

Presented by Matthew Kelly, each episode counts down the Top 20 most viewed TV shows in the UK during a particular year – the series was billed as the "TV time machine". The programme ran for a single series of four episodes. The first episode, "1985", was broadcast on Channel 5 at 9 p.m. on 20 May 2018, while the final three episodes were broadcast at 10 p.m. the following Sundays. As well as the countdown, each episode featured punditry from guests such as Lionel Blair and Maggie Moone, and correspondence from stars of the time (such as Janet Ellis and Rustie Lee), who discussed either the comedy, entertainment, soap or children's TV shows of that year.

The first episode of Top of the Box, "1985", was noted for featuring the final interview with comedian and Bullseye host Jim Bowen, who died a few weeks after filming, whilst the "1989" episode features interviews with Wayne Dobson, Les Dennis and Barry Cryer.

== Episodes ==
No.	Title	Directed by	Written by	Original release date
1	"1985"	Tim Hopewell	Richard Easter	20 May 2018
Includes correspondence from Rustie Lee (comedy & entertainment), John Altman (soap) and Janet Ellis (children's TV) Top 20: 1. EastEnders (BBC); 2. Coronation Street (ITV/Granada); 3. Wish You Were Here...? (ITV/Thames); 4. Open All Hours (BBC); 5. Last of the Summer Wine (BBC); 6. The Prince and Princess of Wales... Talking Personally to Alastair Burnet (ITV/ITN); 7. It'll Be Alright on the Night (ITV/LWT); 8. The Two Ronnies (BBC); 9. That's Life! (BBC); 10. Crossroads (ITV/Central); 11. World Championship Boxing (BBC); 12. A Royal Night of One Hundred Stars (ITV/LWT); 13. Fresh Fields (ITV/Thames); 14. Game for a Laugh (ITV/LWT); 15. Only Fools and Horses (BBC); 16. The Practice (ITV/Granada); 17. Name That Tune (ITV/Thames); 18. Bullseye (ITV/Central); 19. 'Allo 'Allo! (BBC); 20. In Sickness & In Health (BBC)
2	"1989"	Jonathan Megson	Richard Easter	27 May 2018
Includes correspondence from Lesley Joseph (comedy & entertainment), Lyndyann Barrass (children's TV) and Mark Little (soap) Top 20: 1. Coronation Street (ITV/Granada); 2. EastEnders (BBC); 3. Neighbours (BBC/Grundy Television); 4. Only Fools and Horses (BBC); 5. Tyson v Bruno (BBC); 6. Blind Date (ITV/LWT); 7. Bread (BBC); 8. Forever Green (ITV/LWT); 9. Inspector Morse (ITV/Central); 10. The Royal Variety Performance (ITV/LWT); 11. Beadle's About (ITV/LWT); 12. The Heroes (ITV/TVS Films Production); 13. This Is Your Life (ITV/Thames); 14. The Russ Abbot Christmas Show (BBC); 15. The Bill (ITV/Thames); 16. A Bit of a Do (ITV/Yorkshire TV); 17. 'Allo 'Allo! (BBC); 17. The Good Life (BBC); 19. Minder (ITV/Thames); 20. Tanamera (ITV/Central/Grundy Television)
3	"1995"	Zoë Thorman	Richard Easter	3 June 2018
Includes correspondence from Ulrika Jonsson (entertainment), Michael Starke (soap) and Pauline McLynn (comedy) Top 20: 1. Panorama: An Interview with H.R.H. The Princess of Wales (BBC); 2. Coronation Street (ITV/Granada); 3. EastEnders (BBC); 4. Heartbeat (ITV/Yorkshire TV); 5. The National Lottery Live (BBC); 6. Auntie's Brand New Bloomers (BBC); 7. One Foot in the Grave (BBC); 8. Casualty (BBC); 9. Keeping Up Appearances (BBC); 10. Inspector Morse (ITV/Carlton); 11. Police Camera Action! (ITV/Carlton); 12. You've Been Framed (ITV/Granada); 13. London's Burning (ITV/LWT); 14. A Touch of Frost (ITV/Yorkshire TV & Excelsior); 15. Soldier Soldier (ITV/Carlton); 16. Cracker (ITV/Granada); 17. Band of Gold (ITV/Granada); 18. Peak Practice (ITV/Central); 19. The Bill (ITV/Thames); 20. The Beatles Anthology (ITV/Apple Corps Ltd)
4	"1978"	John Piper	Richard Easter	10 June 2018
Includes correspondence from Christopher Biggins (comedy & entertainment), Paul Henry (soap) and Todd Carty (children's TV) Top 20: 1. Sale of the Century (ITV/Anglia); 2. Survival: The Leopard That Changed Its Spots (ITV/Anglia); 3. George & Mildred (ITV/Thames); 4. This Is Your Life (ITV/Thames); 5. The Muppet Show (ITV/Disney/Jim Henson Ltd); 6. Coronation Street (ITV/Granada); 7. Some Mothers Do 'Ave 'Em (BBC); 8. A Sharp Intake of Breath (ITV/ATV); 9. Eric Sykes Shows a Few of Our Favourite Things (ITV/Thames); 10. 1978 European Cup Final (ITV); 11. Morecambe and Wise (ITV/Thames/Barry Cryer/John Junkin); 12. The Sweeney (ITV/Thames); 13. Edward and Mrs Simpson (ITV/Thames); 14. Robin's Nest (ITV/Thames); 15. Miss Jones & Son (ITV/Thames); 16. Rising Damp (ITV/Yorkshire TV); 17. TV Eye (ITV/Thames); 18. Mind Your Language (ITV/LWT); 19. Lillie (ITV/LWT); 20. All Creatures Great & Small (BBC)
