= Sophie and Peter Johnston =

British synthpop duo

Sophie and Peter Johnston are a British brother and sister synthpop duo originally from Newcastle upon Tyne.

They caught the attention of BBC Radio 1 disc jockey John Peel in the 1980s and performed the theme music for the UK music television series TX45, an offshoot from The Tube.

In 1983, the radio session track (not a single until 1986) "Television Satellite" was included as number 37 in Peel's Festive Fifty, an end-of-year chart compiled from votes from listeners to his radio shows – the first track not to be commercially available to make the chart.

Their only entry to the charts came in 1986, when "Happy Together" reached number 99 on the UK Singles Chart.

== Discography ==
=== Albums ===
- Sophie and Peter Johnston (1986)

=== Singles ===
- "Losing You" (1985)
- "Happy Together" (1986) – UK No. 99
- "Television Satellite" (1987)
- "Torn Open" (1987)
