= Dale Meeks =

English actor (1974–2023)

- Born: 6 May 1974; South Shields, Tyne and Wear, England
- Died: 22 April 2023 (aged 48); South Tyneside District Hospital, South Shields, Tyne and Wear, England
- Occupations: Actor, production designer
- Years active: 1990–2023

Dale Meeks (6 May 1974 – 22 April 2023) was an English television and theatre actor.

== Acting career ==
Meeks was best known for his role as Simon Meredith in the ITV soap opera Emmerdale and as the winner of ITV's Celebrity Stars in Their Eyes with Mark Charnock as the Blues Brothers.

Meeks also starred in Byker Grove as the leader of a gang from rival youth club Denton Burn for five series and played Hips in the BBC series Breeze Block.

Meeks toured the UK with the musical Chicago and appeared in the West End production of Love Never Dies.

== Death ==
Meeks died from heart failure at South Shields, South Tyneside District Hospital on 22 April 2023 at 5:34pm, at the age of 48.
