= Andrea Wonfor =

- Born: 31 July 1944
- Died: 10 September 2004 (aged 60); Northumberland, England
- Education: Simon Langton's Girls School, Cambridge University
- Occupations: Television producer & (later) executive
- Spouse(s): Patrick Masefield (1967, div. 1973), Geoff Wonfor (1974, her death)
- Children: 2 daughters

Andrea Jean Wonfor (31 July 1944 – 10 September 2004), also known as Andrea Duncan, was a British television executive and producer. Her successes included The Tube, The Big Breakfast, Byker Grove, and The Word.

== Early life ==
Wonfor was born in 1944 as Andrea Jean Duncan. She was brought up in Canterbury but her father had links to the north of England. She attended Simon Langton Girls' Grammar School in Canterbury before studying at New Hall, Cambridge.

== Career ==
In 1966, after her graduation from Cambridge University, Wonfor became a trainee at Granada Television with the future director-general of the BBC, John Birt, as a fellow new recruit. Three years later, she joined Tyne Tees Television as a researcher and a director. By 1976, she was their head of children's and young people's programmes.

In 1982, with producer Malcolm Gerrie and her second husband, Wonfor created The Tube, a live music programme broadcast from Newcastle-upon-Tyne. The programme was presented by Jools Holland and Paula Yates, launching the broadcasting careers of both presenters, despite their poor audition, according to Holland. The programme attracted high ratings for the then new Channel 4.

In 1989, Wonfor created the children's programme Byker Grove. The programme launched many careers of people from the North-East including Ant & Dec, Jill Halfpenny and Donna Air.

Later she moved to an executive role at Channel 4, at the invitation of Michael Grade, where she commissioned programmes such as The Word, Eurotrash and The Big Breakfast, which helped launch the national career of Chris Evans.

Wonfor moved to ITV where she created the series Longitude and the Jimmy McGovern docu-drama Hillsborough (1996). She also discovered the TV potential of the comedian Caroline Aherne.

She served on the Board of Governors of the British Film Institute in the 1990s.

== Death ==
Wonfor died in Ingoe, Northumberland, in 2004 from a recurrence of breast cancer that she had overcome in 1996.
