= Donna Air =

English actress, producer and philanthropist

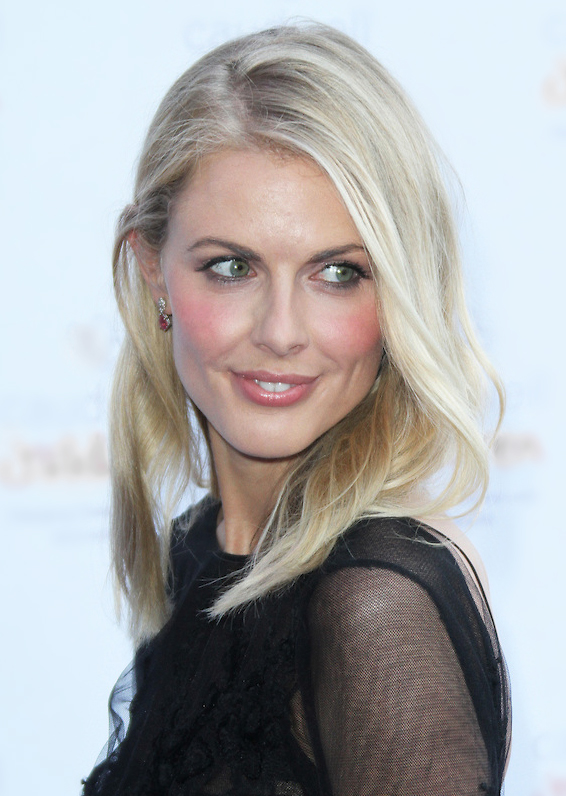
- Donna Air in 2013
- Born: Donna Marie Theresa Air; 2 August 1979 (age 47); Gosforth, Newcastle-upon-Tyne, England
- Occupations: Actress, producer and philanthropist
- Years active: 1992–present
- Partner: Damian Aspinall (2000–2007); James Middleton (2013–2018)
- Children: 1
- Website: donnaair.co.uk

Donna Marie Theresa Air (born 2 August 1979) is an English actress, producer and philanthropist.

== Early life and education ==
Donna Marie Theresa Air was born on 2 August 1979, in Gosforth, North Tyneside, to receptionist Marie (née Lackenby) and mechanical engineer Trevor Air. The eldest of three children, Air has a sister, Francesca, and brother, Alexander.

Air grew up in Gosforth, Newcastle upon Tyne, where she attended St Oswald's Catholic Primary School and later Sacred Heart Convent School and Gosforth High School.

She also attended First Act Theatre, a local youth theatre group. Her fellow students at First Act Theatre included Jill Halfpenny and Anthony McPartlin. Air also modelled as a child, appearing in ads for Nissan, Asda, and Lenor.

== Career ==
Air first appeared as an extra on the CBBC programme Byker Grove at age 10. The producer asked her to audition for a role, and she was cast as Charlie Charlton. In 1994, she and her costars Jayni Hoy and Vicky Taylor formed Byker Groove!, releasing the single "Love Your Sexy", which charted at 48 on the UK Singles Chart. Air moved to London at 15, continuing the band as a duo with Hoy as Crush. Two of the band's singles released in 1996, "Jellyhead" and "Luv'd Up", charted in the UK at 50 and 45 respectively, while their debut studio album Teenage Kicks failed to chart. The band's management team booked Crush on a tour of the United States, Japan and South East Asia, commencing after Air completed her GCSEs, with "Jellyhead" subsequently peaking at 76 on the Billboard Hot 100.

Following her promotional touring, she returned to the United Kingdom and in September 1997 signed to MTV UK to host the daily live show, MTV Select, later becoming a presenter of several shows including The Big Breakfast, Channel 4's flagship morning entertainment show. Air departed MTV Select in April 2000, citing her desire to return to acting and to devote more time to her role on The Big Breakfast as the reasons for her departure. In January 2001, Air was promoted to a main presenter on The Big Breakfast in a relaunch of the programme amid falling viewer figures. However, Air later resigned in May of that year, with Channel 4 axing The Big Breakfast shortly thereafter. Also in May, Air appeared in The Mummy Returns, the sequel to The Mummy (1999), in a "blink-and-you'll-miss-it cameo" that BBC film critic Neil Smith described as one of the only points of difference between the sequel and the original film.

She has also appeared in many television dramas, most recently Hollyoaks in 2010 and Hotel Babylon in 2008, BBC TV comedy Operation Good Guys, Catherine Cookson's six-parter A Dinner of Herbs, and Lynda La Plante's Supply & Demand. Air appeared in the films Still Crazy (1998) and Bad Day (2008) amongst others. Air presented on Five's early evening, magazine programme Live from Studio Five, alongside regular presenter of the programme, Kate Walsh.

In January 2013, Air participated in the ITV programme Splash! She replaced Jennifer Metcalfe at short notice. In November 2017, Air announced that she would be taking part in the tenth series of Dancing on Ice. She was partnered with Mark Hanretty. They were eliminated in Week 7.

In 2019, Air was announced as having a starring role in the second series of the drama The Split, which started airing on BBC One in February 2020.

== Personal life ==
In 2000, Air was introduced to businessman and animal conservationist Damian Aspinall by their mutual friend Tara Palmer-Tomkinson. The pair began a long-term relationship, and Air gave birth to their daughter, Freya Air Aspinall, in September 2003. Shortly after her birth, the couple announced their intention to place her in the care of a gorilla, a ritual in which Aspinall's older children had already taken part.

Air and Aspinall separated amicably in 2007. From 2013 to 2018, Air was in a relationship with James Middleton, the younger brother of Catherine, Princess of Wales;

Air has supported charities including the Macmillan Cancer Support, Race for Life, Sport Relief, and Jeans for Genes.

As of 2019 she was living in Chelsea, London.

== Filmography ==
=== Film ===
Year	Title	Role	Notes
1998	Still Crazy	Dutch Hitch-Hiker	
1999	Truth or Dare	Louise	Short film
2001	The Mummy Returns	Show Girl	
2002	The One & Only	Donna	
2008	Bad Day	Abby Barrett	
2013	The Counselor	Chauffeur	
2015	Age of Kill	Sarah Blake	
2021	Dragged Up	Alex	Short film
2022	The Bubble	Susan Howard	

=== Television ===
Year	Title	Role	Notes
1992-1995	Byker Grove	Charlie Charlton	4 series
1998	Supply & Demand	Lucy	2 episodes
2000	A Dinner of Herbs	Maggie Roystan	3 episodes
2000	Operation Good Guys	As Herself	Series 3, episode 2
2000-01	The Big Breakfast	Presenter	
2002	Breeze Block	Kiki	Miniseries
2008	Hotel Babylon	Rachel	One episode
2010	Hollyoaks	Sophia	One episode
2020	The Split	Fi Hansen	6 episodes
