= London Motor Museum =

- Location within Greater London
- Established: 2012; 14 years ago
- Dissolved: June 2018; 8 years ago
- Location: Hayes, Hillingdon; England
- Coordinates: 51°30′07″N 0°25′15″W
- Type: Transport museum

The London Motor Museum had more than 160 exhibits; they included classic cars from the 1960s, 1970s and 1980s, and a selection of famous cars – including Herbie the Volkswagen Beetle, one of six original Batmobiles used in the first Batman (1989) film, and a Ford Gran Torino from the television series Starsky & Hutch. The museum closed down permanently in June 2018 after a dispute with the local council over business rates. The vehicles have now been moved to other museums across the UK.

== Management ==
The museum's founder, known as Elo King, a former model, drove with Maximillion Cooper in the first Gumball 3000 rally in 1999.

== Gallery ==
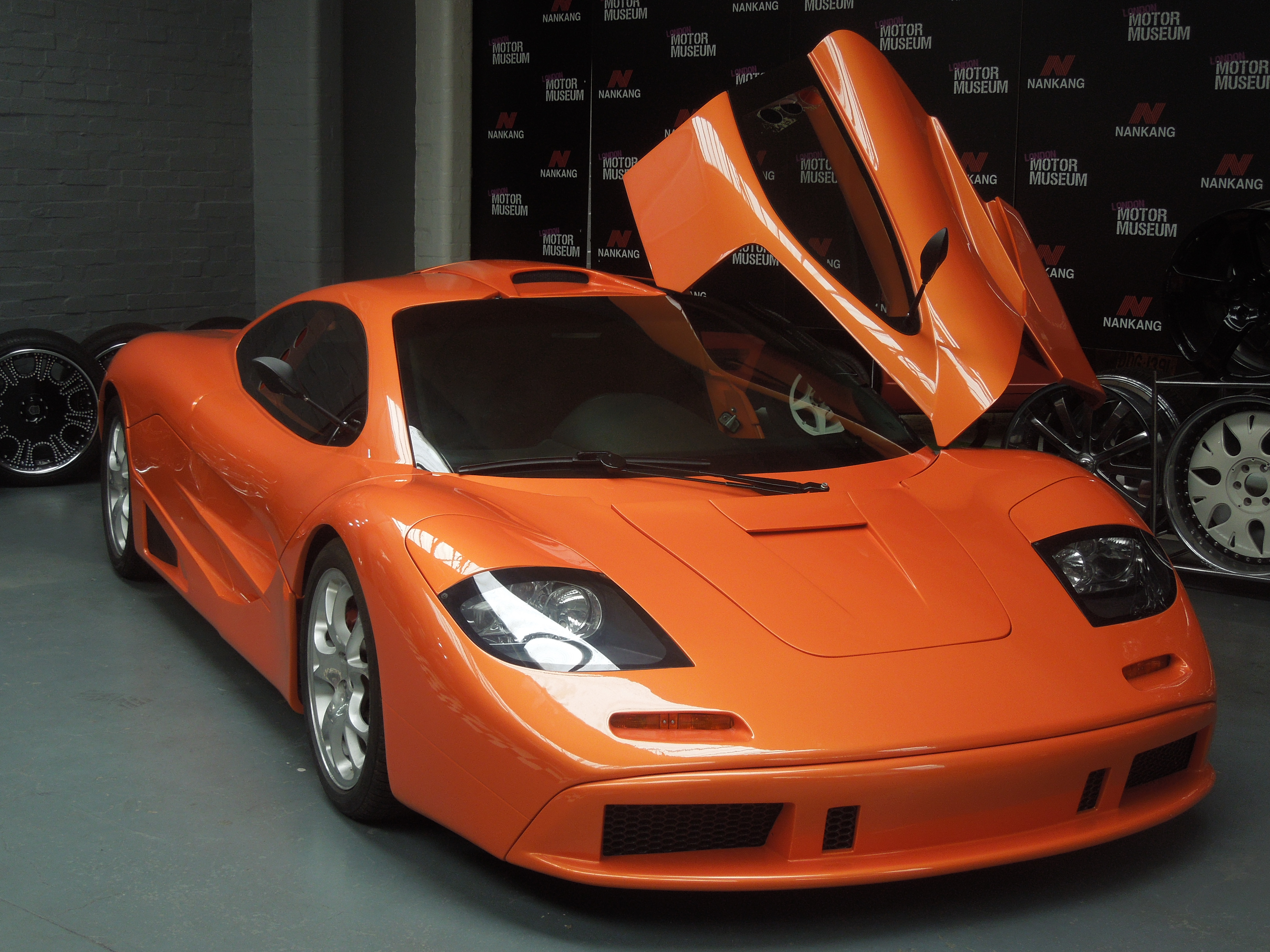

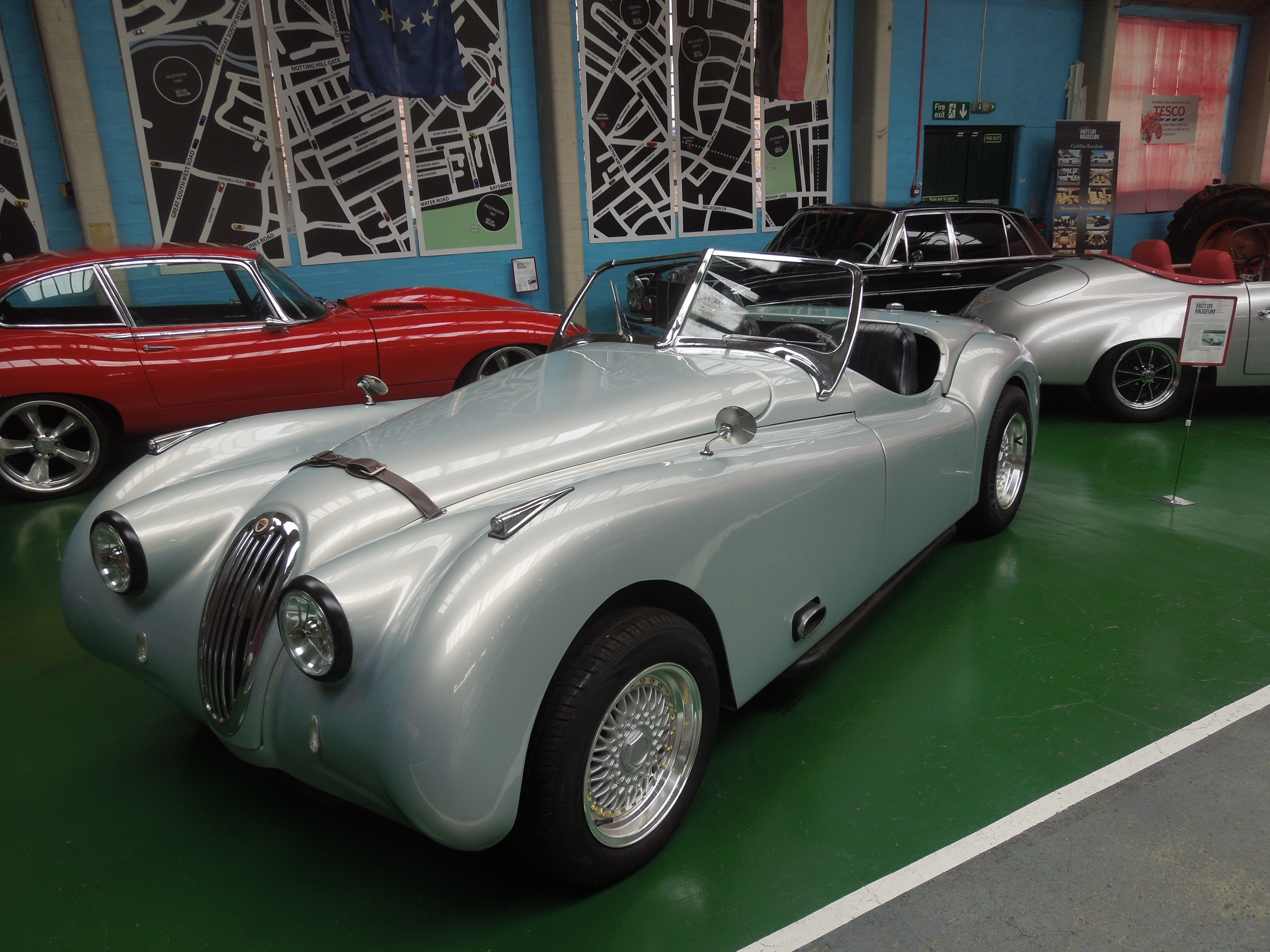

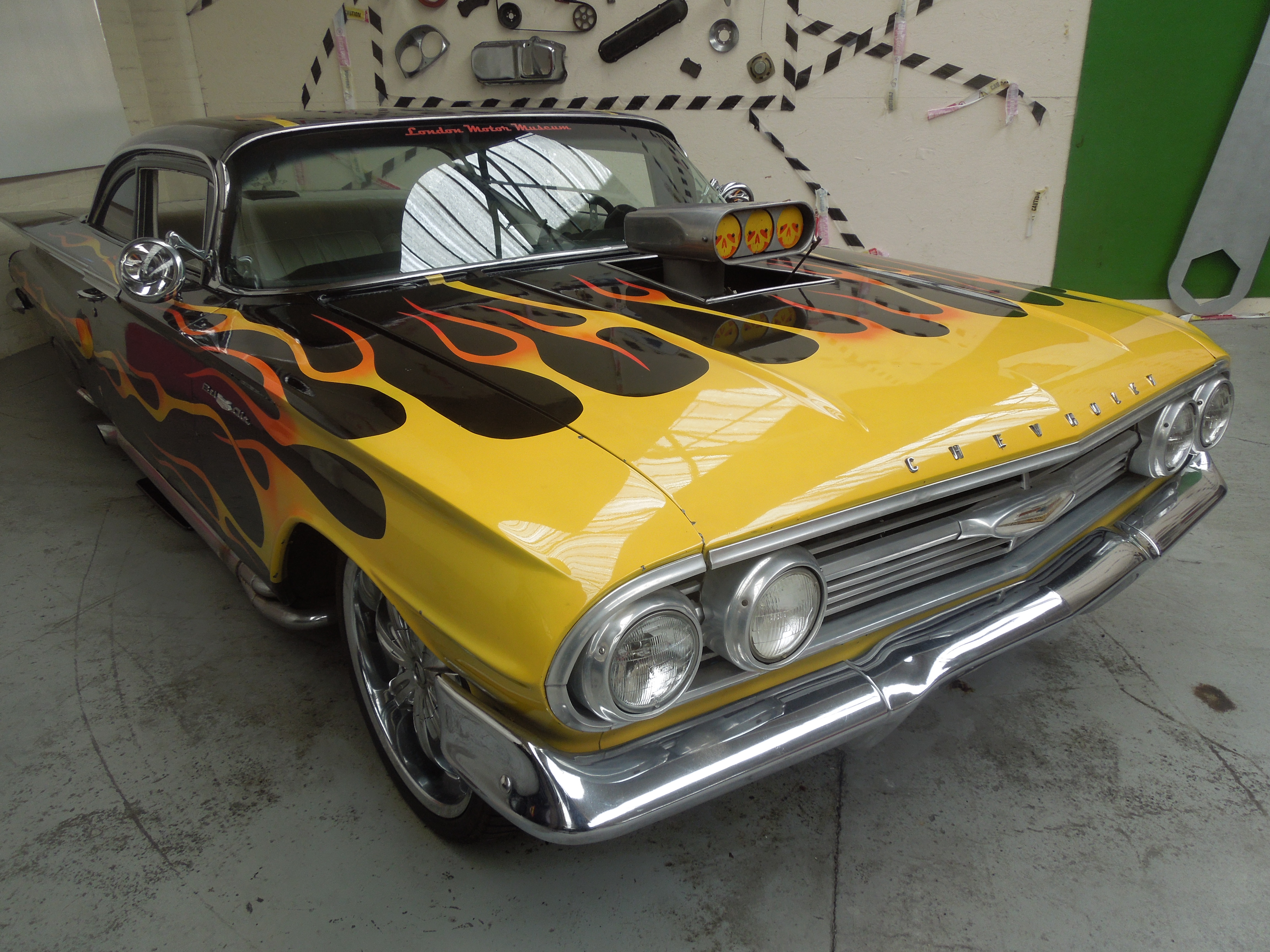
