= Southwyck House =

Housing complex in Brixton, London

Coordinates: 51.4623°N 0.1086°W

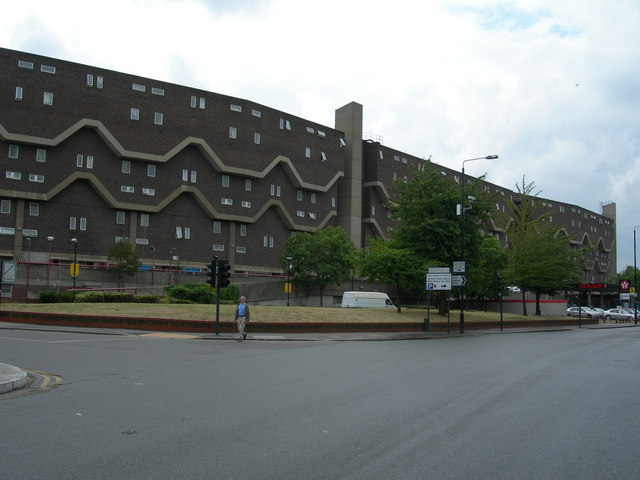
Southwyck House

Southwyck House, also known locally as the Barrier Block, is a large housing building on the Somerleyton Estate in Brixton, south London. It was commissioned by Lambeth Council and approved by a planning committee, which included future prime minister John Major.

== Design ==
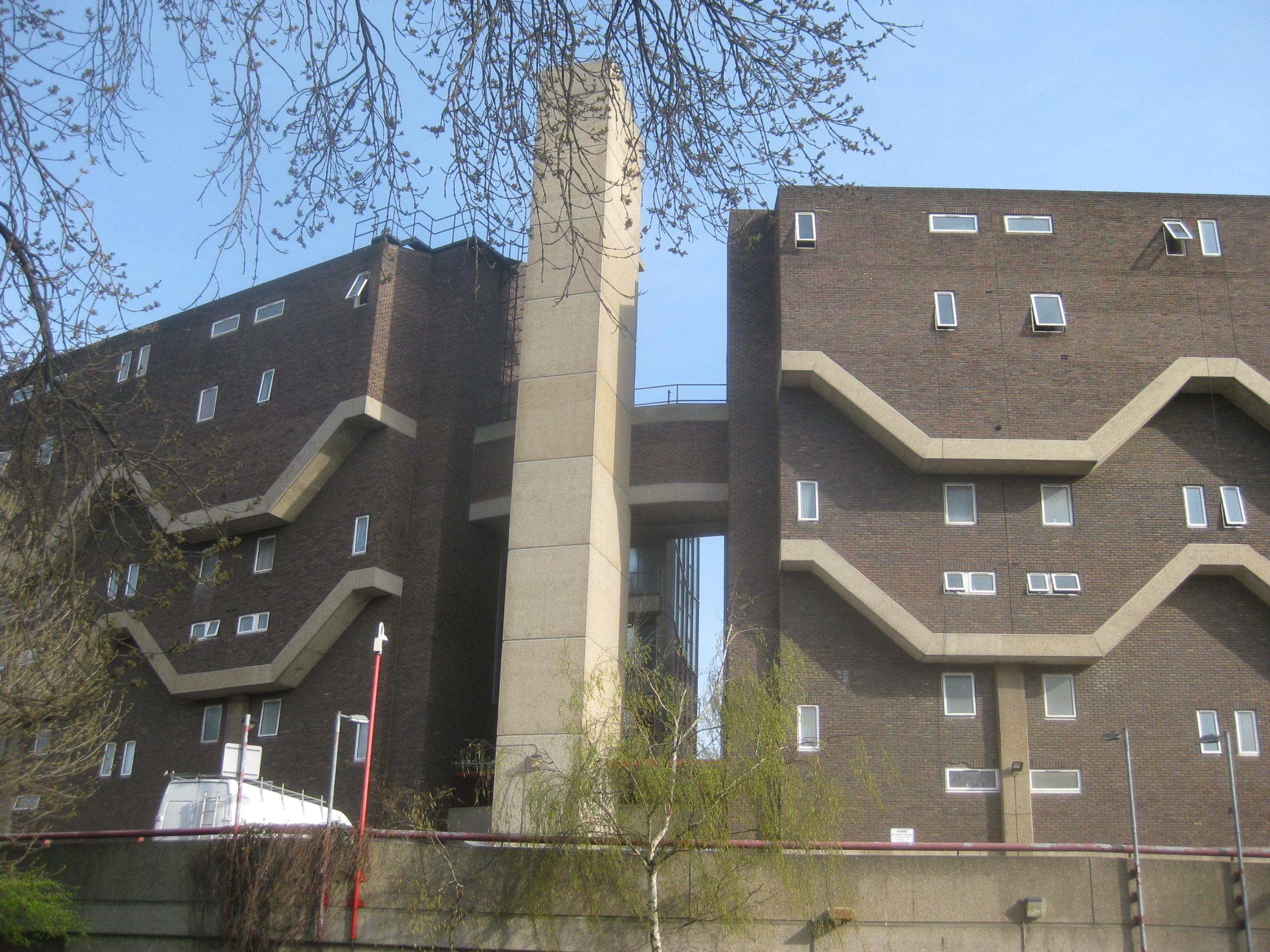
The wall facing what would have been the South Cross Route flyover was designed to have small windows

The block is in the Brutalist style and has similarities to Park Hill, Sheffield and Byker Wall, Tyneside. The block has 176 properties, consisting of 3 low rise flats and 173 high rise flats.

It was designed in 1968-70 by a team of architects including Magda Borowiecka, and built between 1972-1981. The building was designed to account for the South Cross Route motorway passing adjacent to the building. Although the motorway plan was scrapped in 1973, the design was kept, including small windows on the wall that would have faced this flyover.

Borowiecka said "The motorway would have been 60ft up in the air, so I needed to create a blank wall going up higher than that. It was rather miserable and I had to think of some way to make an interesting building."

== History ==
During construction the block had no name, simply being called the Loughborough Park redevelopment and locally known as 'Brixton Nick' for its resemblance to a prison. Proposed names included 'Hillmead' and 'Northcliff'.

Residents of the building suffered from crime including burglary and the use of heroin and crack cocaine, and so alterations were made to the building in the 1990s to improve security. Several of the building's flats were squatted for several years from its completion.

== See also ==
- Byker Wall
