= Jellyhead =

1996 single by Crush

Single by Crush
- Released: 12 February 1996
- Length: 3:36
- Label: Telstar
- Songwriters: Pete Smith; Jonny Male; Danny de Matos
- Producer: Steve Rodway

Crush singles chronology
"Jellyhead" (1996)	"Luv'd Up" (1996)

Audio
- "Jellyhead" on YouTube

"Jellyhead" is a song released by British musical duo Crush in February 1996. The song peaked at number 50 in the United Kingdom, number 72 in the United States, and number 32 in Australia.

== Track listings ==
UK and Japanese CD single

1. "Jellyhead" (radio edit) – 3:36
2. "Jellyhead" (Motiv8's Pumphouse 7-inch edit) – 4:25
3. "Jellyhead" (Motiv8's Pumphouse remix) – 7:22
4. "Jellyhead" (Motiv8's Dubhouse remix) – 7:19
5. "Jellyhead" (Double Dust remix) – 7:06
6. "Jellyhead" (Oven Ready remix) – 6:42

UK cassette single

1. "Jellyhead" (radio edit) – 3:36
2. "Jellyhead" (Motiv8's Pumphouse 7-inch edit) – 4:25

US maxi-CD single

1. "Jellyhead" (radio edit) – 3:32
2. "Jellyhead" (Motiv8's Pumphouse 7-inch edit) – 4:22
3. "Jellyhead" (Motiv8's Pumphouse remix) – 7:19
4. "Jellyhead" (Oven Ready remix) – 6:42

Australian and New Zealand CD single

1. "Jellyhead" (Motiv8's Pumphouse 7-inch edit) – 4:22
2. "Jellyhead" (Motiv 8's Pumphouse extended mix) – 7:19
3. "Jellyhead" (Oven Ready remix) – 6:42
4. "Jellyhead" (pop version) – 3:32

== Charts ==
Chart (1996–1997)	Peak position
Australia (ARIA)	32
Scotland Singles (OCC)	52
UK Singles (OCC)	50
US Billboard Hot 100	72

== Release history ==
Region	Date	Format(s)	Label(s)	Ref.
United Kingdom	12 February 1996	CD	Telstar	
United States	25 June 1996	Contemporary hit; rhythmic contemporary radio	Telstar	
Japan	21 July 1996	CD	Telstar	
