= Apocadelic =

Studio album by Point Break
- Released: 7 August 2000
- Recorded: 1999–2000
- Genres: Pop, rock
- Length: 41:26
- Label: Warner Bros.
- Producers: Graham Stack; Brian Rawling

Singles from Apocadelic
- 1. "Do We Rock?" Released: 27 September 1999; 2. "Stand Tough" Released: 10 January 2000; 3. "Freakytime" Released: 10 April 2000; 4. "You" Released: 24 July 2000; 5. "What About Us?" Released: 20 November 2000

Apocadelic is the debut and only studio album by British boy band Point Break. The album was released on 7 August 2000 and peaked at number 21 on the UK Albums Chart.

== Track listing ==
No.	Title	Writer(s)	Length
1.	"Do We Rock?"	David Oliver; Brett Adams; Danielle Barnett; Johnathan Newman; George Robert Trotter; David Charles Holmes; Graham Stack	3:14
2.	"Stand Tough"	Oliver; Adams; Barnett; Johnathan Newman; Trotter; Holmes; Andrew Tumi; Kenneth Nathaniel Barry	3:49
3.	"Freakytime"	Oliver; Adams; Barnett; Newman; Holmes; Tumi; Barry	4:21
4.	"The Game" (live)	Oliver; Adams; Barnett; Newman; Holmes; Tumi; Barry	3:51
5.	"Baby, I Don't Care!"	Nicholas Sayer	3:27
6.	"You"	Oliver; Adams; Barnett; Holmes; Declan Bennett	4:21
7.	"What About Us?"	Oliver; Adams; Barnett; Holmes; Bennett	4:21
8.	"Say Yeah!"	Oliver; Adams; Trotter; Barnett; Holmes; Tumi; Barry	3:53
9.	"Apocadelic"	Oliver; Adams; Barnett; Holmes; Bennett; Tumi; Barry	3:25
10.	"Tag the Party!"	Oliver; Adams; Barnett; Holmes; Bennett; Tumi; Barry	3:03
11.	"Freakytime" (unplugged)	Oliver; Adams; Barnett; Newman; Holmes; Tumi; Barry	4:11

== Charts ==
Chart (2000)	Peak position
European Albums Chart	90
Finnish Albums (Suomen virallinen lista)	35
Japanese Albums (Oricon)	83
Scottish Albums (OCC)	16
UK Albums (OCC)	21
