= Alison Mac =

British actress from North East England

Alison Mac is a British actress. She is from North East England. She has played Wilf (daughter of Jerome Flynn's character 'Tom McCabe') in the short lived BBC Wildlife Drama Series Badger from 1999 to 2000. She is probably best known for her portrayal of Kate in the BBC Three comedy series Two Pints of Lager and a Packet of Crisps, which she was in for one series in 2004. She was one of the main characters in the short-lived drama Rescue Me, which ran for one series in 2002.

Mac has also appeared as Rosanna Webb in one episode of BBC One drama Holby City and also in Hollyoaks as Barry "Newt" Newton's social worker on 11 January 2008.

In 2009, Mac worked at the BBC Studios in Newcastle upon Tyne giving guided tours of the building, including the Look North set, the BBC Newcastle suites and the offices.
