= Billy Fane =

British actor

- Born: Malcolm Collins; 1947 or 1948
- Occupation: Actor
- Years active: 1989–2011

Billy Fane (born Malcolm Collins; 1947 or 1948) is an English former actor and comedian. He came to prominence in 1989 as Geoff Keegan, the manager of the Byker Grove youth club featured in the BBC television series of the same name. He remained in the role for eleven years (twelve series), until his character was killed off in a gas explosion. He won a BAFTA award for his performance in a Byker Grove episode.

Fane left school with no qualifications. During his years as comedian on the club circuit, he was known as Little Billy Fane.

After leaving Byker Grove, Fane appeared in pantomimes around his native North East England. He also trained to become a teacher and worked with dyslexic adults. He obtained a master's degree in Special Education Needs and Intuitive Learning from the University of Hull. The school had a contract for providing education to young offenders around the United Kingdom.

Fane went on to appear as Mr Braithwaite, the pianist in Billy Elliot (2000). The same year, he appeared in Purely Belter. In 2001, he appeared in the television series Heartbeat.

In 2002, Fane reverted to using his birth name of Malcolm Collins. He was a special-needs coordinator at New College Durham and was working with inmates of Castington Young Offenders Institution.
