= Karbon Homes =

- Founded: April 2017
- Type: Housing association
- Location: Multiple offices
- Region served: Northern England, United Kingdom
- Key people: Sir David Bell (chairman), Paul Fiddaman (group chief executive)
- Revenue: £100 million (2024)
- Employees: 1,000 (2024)
- Website: karbonhomes.co.uk

Karbon Homes is a housing association in the United Kingdom, formed in 2017 as a merger between Cestria Community Housing, Derwentside Homes, and Isos Housing. The organisation owns around 34,000 properties and houses over 80,000 people in Northern England.

Karbon Homes additionally own 54North Homes, a separate subsidiary who provide social housing throughout Yorkshire, with offices in York and Leeds.

== History ==
Karbon Homes, formerly Cestria Community Housing, Derwentside Homes, and Isos Housing, was formed in April 2017.

In 2019, York Housing Association joined the Karbon Group, and with the 2023 acquisition of Leeds & Yorkshire Housing Association, they were merged to form 54North Homes, managing 7,000 properties throughout the Yorkshire area.

In 2020, it was announced Sir David Bell, the vice-chancellor and chief executive of the University of Sunderland, would join the board as chairman.

In 2021, Karbon Homes acquired 1,800 homes as part of its acquisition of the Byker Community Trust housing association. The Byker Community Trust manage 1,800 properties in Byker, Newcastle upon Tyne - including the Byker Wall.

Leazes Homes - an arms-length organisation of Newcastle City Council joined Karbon Homes in 2024 as a wholly owned subsidiary.
