= Do We Rock =

1999 single by Point Break

- UK CD 1

Single by Point Break

from the album Apocadelic
- Released: 27 September 1999
- Length: 3:17
- Label: Eternal; WEA
- Songwriters: David Oliver; Brett Adams; Danielle Barnett; Johnathan Newman; George Robert Trotter; David Charles Holmes; Graham Stack
- Producers: Brian Rawling; Graham Stack

Point Break singles chronology
"Do We Rock" (1999)	"Stand Tough" (2000)

"Do We Rock" is a song by British pop group Point Break. It was released on 27 September 1999 in the United Kingdom through Eternal Records and WEA as the group's debut single. It was included on their debut studio album, Apocadelic (2000). Upon its release, the song reached number 29 on the UK Singles Chart.

== Track listings ==
UK CD1

1. "Do We Rock" (radio mix) – 3:17
2. "Do We Rock" (Jay Jay's hip hop mix) – 4:07
3. "Do We Rock" (New Mount City Breakers mix) – 5:26
4. "Do We Rock" (video)

UK CD2

1. "Do We Rock" (radio mix) – 3:17
2. "Do We Rock" (New Decade mix) – 5:04
3. Exclusive Point Break interview

UK cassette single

1. "Do We Rock" (radio mix) – 3:17
2. "Do We Rock" (Jay Jay's hip hop mix) – 4:07

European CD single

1. "Do We Rock" (radio mix) – 3:17
2. "Do We Rock" (New Decade 12-inch mix) – 5:04

Japanese CD1

1. "Do We Rock" (radio mix)
2. "Do We Rock" (Jay Jay's hip hop mix)
3. "Do We Rock" (New Mount City Breakers mix)

Japanese CD2

1. "Do We Rock" (radio mix)
2. "Do We Rock" (New Decade 12-inch mix)
3. "Apocadelic"
4. "Do We Rock" (new album version)

== Charts ==
=== Weekly charts ===
Chart (1999)	Peak position
Europe (Eurochart Hot 100)	92
Scotland Singles (OCC)	54
UK Singles (OCC)	29

=== Year-end charts ===
Chart (1999)	Position
Romania (Romanian Top 100)	74

== Release history ==
Region	Date	Format(s)	Label(s)	Ref.
United Kingdom	27 September 1999	CD; cassette	Eternal; WEA	
Japan	12 July 2000	CD	WEA Japan	
Japan	12 October 2000	CD	WEA Japan	
