= Freakytime =

- UK CD 1

Single by Point Break

from the album Apocadelic
- Released: 10 April 2000
- Genre: Pop, Europop
- Length: 4:21
- Label: Eternal Records / WEA Records
- Songwriter(s): Andrew Tumi; Brett Adams; David Holmes; David Oliver; Danielle Barnett; Johnathan Newman; Kenny Barry; Nicol Lampert
- Producer(s): Brian Rawling; Graham Stack

Point Break singles chronology
"Stand Tough" (2000)	"Freakytime" (2000)	"You" (2000)

"Freakytime" is a song by British group Point Break. It was released on 10 April 2000 on CD single in the United Kingdom through Eternal Records / WEA Records as the third single from their debut studio album, Apocadelic.

== Track listing ==
CD1 (WEA265CD1)

1. "Freakytime" (radio mix) - 4:21
2. "Freakytime" (original mix) - 4:41
3. "Freakytime" (Unplugged version) - 4:10

CD2 (WEA265CD2)

1. "Freakytime" (radio mix) - 4:21
2. "Freakytime" (Supafly dub) - 5:30
3. "The Game" (Live version) - 3:52
4. CD_Rom Video "Freakytime" - 4:21

== Weekly charts ==
Chart (2000)	Peak position
Estonia (Eesti Top 20)	7
UK Singles (OCC)	13

== Release history ==
Region	Date	Format	Label
United Kingdom	10 April 2000	CD single	Eternal Records / WEA Records
