= Stand Tough =

2000 single by Point Break

- UK CD 1

Single by Point Break

from the album Apocadelic
- Released: 10 January 2000
- Length: 3:30
- Label: Eternal
- Songwriters: Andrew Tumi; Brett Adams; David Holmes; David Oliver; Danielle Barnett; George Trotter; Kenny Barry
- Producers: Brian Rawling; Graham Stack

Point Break singles chronology
"Do We Rock" (1999)	"Stand Tough" (2000)	"Freakytime" (2000)

"Stand Tough" is a song by British pop group Point Break. It was released in January 2000 in the United Kingdom through Eternal Records as the second single from their debut studio album, Apocadelic (2000), and reached number seven on the UK Singles Chart. The song was used in Australia as the Seven Network's theme for coverage of the AFL and Australian Open tennis in 2000.

== Track listings ==
UK CD1 and Australian CD single

1. "Stand Tough" (radio edit) – 3:30
2. "Stand Tough" (album version) – 3:48
3. "Stand Tough" (Tufftown mix) – 6:01

UK CD2 and Japanese CD single

1. "Stand Tough" (radio edit) – 3:30
2. "Stand Tough" (New Decade Ibiza mix) – 6:00
3. "Stand Tough" (Tufftown dub) – 6:02
4. "Stand Tough" (enhanced CD video)

UK cassette single

1. "Stand Tough" (radio edit) – 3:30
2. "Stand Tough" (album version) – 3:48

== Charts ==
Weekly chart performance for "Stand Tough"
Chart (2000)	Peak position
Australia (ARIA)	49
Europe (Eurochart Hot 100)	39
Scottish Singles Sales (Official Charts)	10
UK Singles (Official Charts)	7

== Release history ==
Release dates and formats for "Stand Tough"
Region	Date	Format	Label	Ref.
United Kingdom	10 January 2000	CD; cassette	Eternal	
Japan	17 May 2000	CD	Eternal	
