= Byker Wall =

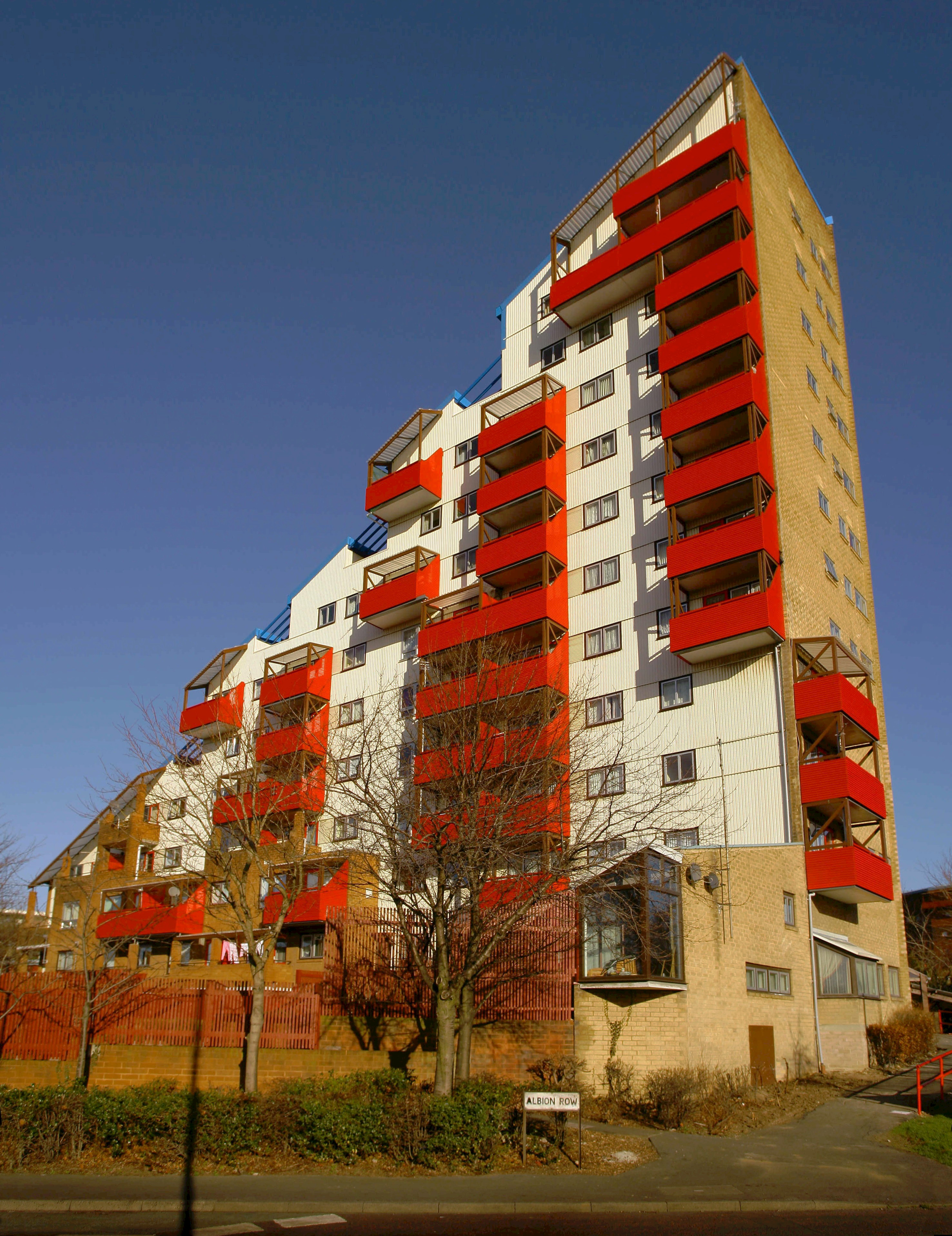
- Tom Collins House, Byker Wall Estate

- Location in Tyne and Wear

General information
- Location: Tyne and Wear, England, UK
- Coordinates: 54.975°N 1.578°W
- OS grid: NZ270645
- Landlord: Byker Community Trust

The Byker Wall is a long, unbroken block of 620 maisonettes in the Byker district of Newcastle upon Tyne, England. They were designed by Ralph Erskine and constructed in the 1970s. The wall is just part of the estate, which in total covers 200 acres (80 hectares).

== Design and construction ==
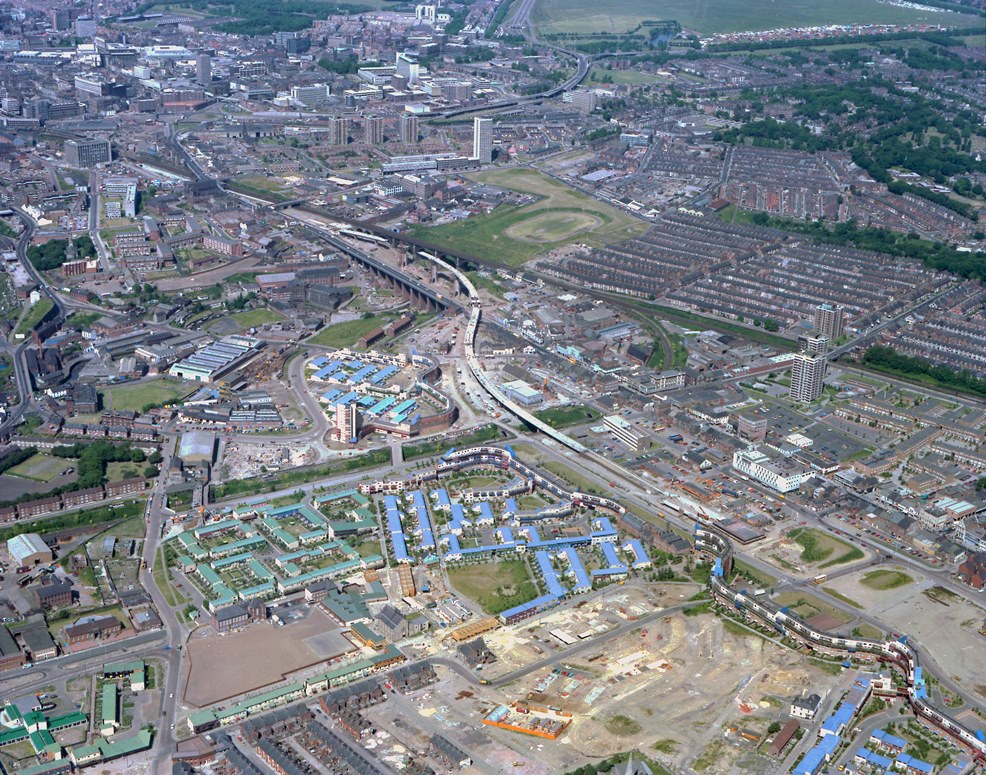
Aerial photograph, from 1978, of the Byker Wall under construction

The Wall, along with the low-rise dwellings built to its south, replaced Victorian slum terraced housing. There were nearly 1200 houses on the site at Byker. They had been condemned as unfit for human habitation in 1953, and demolition began in 1966.

The new housing block was designed by Ralph Erskine, assisted by Vernon Gracie. Design began in 1968 and construction took place between 1969 and 1982. The architects opened an office on site to develop communication and trust between the existing residents. Existing buildings were to be demolished as the new accommodation was built.

The new high-rise block was designed to shield the site from an intended motorway, which was never built. Construction materials for Byker Wall were relatively cheap, concrete, brick and timber. Surfaces were treated with bright colours, while brick bandings were used on the 'Wall' to indicate floor levels.

Its Functionalist Romantic styling with textured, complex facades, colourful brick, wood and plastic panels, attention to context, and relatively low-rise construction represented a major break with the Brutalist high-rise architectural orthodoxy of the time.

Following completion, fewer than 20% of the original local residents were housed at Byker Wall.

== Refurbishment ==
Refurbishment of the whole estate was commenced in partnership with Your Homes Newcastle (YHN), the social housing arm of Newcastle City Council. The work was undertaken by Mansell, a division of Balfour Beatty. The work involved careful reinstatement of original features and colour schemes, using modernised materials where possible, while retaining the look and feel of the 1970s design scheme. For example, a new coloured aluminium window frame was designed to allow for improved security and insulation, without compromising the visual impact of the buildings. The most recent phase of this was completed in June 2008. A bid for PFI funding from the Homes and Communities Agency (to the value of £80 million) was sought in June 2009 to fund the project, which was estimated to cost £210 million, but was rejected as it did not meet the criteria; subsequent negotiations with the Department for Communities and Local Government led to the creation of the Byker Community Trust in 2012.

A two-year refurbishment programme with a budget of £26 million began in April 2014. New roofs, doors and windows will be installed and the estate will be repainted in line with the original colour scheme.

In February 2019 local company JDDK were appointed to undertake further upgrades to the estate on a £4 million contract.

The Byker Community Trust (‘BCT’) was incorporated in September 2011 under the Industrial and Provident Society Act 1965 with charitable objectives. BCT is also a ‘registered provider’ of social housing.

In July 2012, a stock transfer from Newcastle City Council was completed and BCT became the owner of 1,800 properties.

== Awards and recognition ==
In 2013, Bolam Coyne won the Royal Institute Chartered Surveyors award for Best North East Regeneration Project of the Year.

In 2003 the Department for Culture, Media and Sport announced a proposal to award the Byker estate, of which the Wall forms a part, a Grade II listed rating as an example of outstanding architecture. In January 2007, the Estate became a grade II* listed building (grade two star).

Its innovative and visionary design has earned it the Civic Trust Awards, the Eternit Award, the Ambrose Congreve Award for Housing (in 1980), and the first Veronica Rudge Green Prize for Urban Design in 1988 from Harvard University's Graduate School of Design. The Wall has also been placed on UNESCO's list of outstanding twentieth century buildings.

In 1988 Byker Wall was featured in an episode of Building Sights presented by writer Beatrix Campbell, who compared the development to a pomegranate.

== See also ==
- Southwyck House
