= Women's media in Francoist Spain =

Women's media in Francoist Spain suffered as a result of Francoist Spain policy. Many writers, translators and others were forced into exile, or faced stifling censorship and harassment if they remained. Spanish restrictions meant writing became one of the few acceptable occupations for women, and literate women with few other outlets for participation in Spanish society became voracious readers.

Internationalism disappeared in the early days of Spanish literature. The 1940s and 1950s saw the most popular form of women's literature being romance novels. Despite important literary contributions like Carmen Laforet's 1945 novel Nada, the 1940, 1950s and 1960s were a period where the broader male dominated literary establishment refused to take women's literary efforts seriously. The major theme in women's literature was trying to understand women's place in society in the period between the 1940s and 1950s, changing in the next decade with women beginning to challenge their role in society and to argue more for women's rights in literature. The death of Franco in 1975 would see women writers liberated in the themes they could explore.

In the early Francoist period, comic reproduced the gender roles advocated by the state, and were used to push this ideology onto children. Explorations of women's roles in society began to appear in comics in the 1970s, while women also began to appear as more three dimensional people and less as pure sex objects. Women were often portrayed as chaste, saintly figures who submitted to male authority in government approved domestic films. Starting in the 1950s, foreign movies in Spain presented women with images of beautiful and glamorous women who had their own agency.

Censorship became a new reality for many women writers in Francoist Spain. Publishers were subject to government control, and the Catholic Church was highly influential in what was allowed to be published. This would not begin to change until the 1970s, when some restrictions were relaxed.

== Overview ==
Following the Spanish Civil War, many writers, translators and other women involved in media production during the Second Republic went into exile. This included almost all Spain's most prominent feminist of the time. Those who remained faced repression, either because of their views or because of the language they spoke.

Writing was one of the few culturally acceptable forms of industry for women in the Franco period because it did not require women to leave the home to take up the occupation. Lack of education though could often lead to problems in the quality of women's writing, which would serve to further marginalize women's writing and their broader exclusion from Spanish literary canon of the Francoist period as a result.

With few other outlets for participation in Spanish society, many literate women spent hours a day reading various print publications and consuming other medium like radio programs. These included magazines, romance novels, history books, religious books and literary novels. This would inspire a new generation of women's writers and producers, both in print and other mediums.

== Literature ==
=== 1930s ===
In the post-Civil War period, women's fiction was often marginalized, unclassified and dismissed as unimportant. A body of this work has largely disappeared, serving in part to erase the daily experiences of women in the early Francoist period. Almost none of the works of Spanish women in the period would make their way into the Spanish literary canon, largely as a result of the literary community at the time being dominated by the male victors of the Spanish Civil War. Starting with the end of the Civil War, Catalan language materials would officially be prohibited in the press and media until the 1970s. This would impact many women writers during the Franco period.

The start of the Franco period represented the start where internationalism disappeared from Spanish literature in favor of state favored domestically produced texts. At the same time, many of Spain's domestically produced works would not be translated into other languages or distributed internationally. Foreign literature would continue to enter Spain through more covert channels, bypassing censors. Spanish literature would not achieve any degree of major internationalism until after Franco's death, when many leading leftist Spanish publishers like Editorial Lumen would be acquired by international publishers like Random House.

=== 1940s and 1950s ===
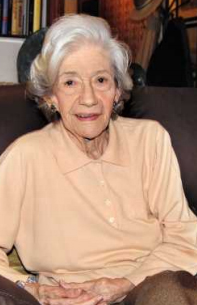
Spanish writer Ana María Matute.

The most popular novels written by women in the 1940s and 1950s were romance novels (Spanish: novelas rosas), outselling all other types of women's writings. These were not serious literary works, but were intended for mass consumption.

Carmen Laforet was the most important Spanish woman novelist during the 1940s, with her novel Nada published in 1945. It challenged Francoist Spain by showing a dirty underside that served as a counterpoint to the triumphalism of the Nationalists. Ana María Matute was one of the most important Spanish women novelists of the 1950s and 1960s. Her works were similar to that of Laforet and had Civil War themes, but represented a perspective of a child. The 1940, 1950s and 1960s were a period where the broader male dominated literary establishment refused to take women's literary efforts seriously. Francisco García Pavón asked in an interview about women's writings, "Are women's arms to weak for the oars of a great novel?" to which he basically answered yes. Consequently, there was very little serious criticism of women's writings and an erasure of their efforts in the immediate post war period. When their works were criticized, they were often compared only to works of other women in the past and found wanting. Some criticism in literary publications would comment on a female writers appearance, while taking very little note of her actual writings. When good women writers like Carmen Nonell were recognized, they were recognized in ways that sought to erase their gender. When women's works in the 1950s were perceived as offering social commentary on Spanish life, they were often subjected to critical commentary that tried to dismiss criticism of women as being an unnecessary female incursion into masculine life. At the same time, any promotion of the work of women writers as women writers was viewed as undermining women's creative and intellectual reputations. Male literary society believed women could only be properly supported by ignoring their status as women.

A key theme of women writers in the 1940s and 1950s was understanding their role in society. Examples of such works include those by Carmen Laforet. Unlike earlier periods, these novelists did not use their writings to argue that women were entitled to equal rights. Their domestic writings did not espouse radical philosophies that would have challenged Francoist Spain. Overtly female Francoist writers were held in even less esteem than their male contemporaries, a situation that would continue throughout and after the fall of Francoism in Spain.

=== 1960s ===
The 1960s would begin to see a change in major themes in women's writings, with women beginning to challenge their role in society and to argue more for women's rights. This represented both self-realization in women expressed in fiction and a begin to a return of Republican era thinking about women. These writers were not intending to subvert Francoism, the Catholic Church or their parents, but instead were about improving their own situations and creating more opportunities. These women were not ideologically united for a variety of reasons, including their educational backgrounds, shifting positions in Spain sanctioned organizations like Sección Feminina, the lack of a clear ideological viewpoint from Francoism and that their beliefs contradicted societal norms which they needed to explore in more socially accepted methods to avoid censorship.

During the 1960s, publishers were afraid to take risks in printing many new novels out of fear of Francoist interference, even when the established risks were low. This particularly disadvantaged women writers who already faced many commercial obstacles. Writers in the 1960s were often poorly paid and could not afford to live exclusively on money earned from their craft. Women had a slight advantage of their male counterparts in that social norms at the time meant middle and upper class women could more easily rely on their families for financial support.

=== 1970s ===
Catalan Esther Tusquets was an important woman author in the 1970s and 1980s, though her works are notable in this period for being unlike her peers in exploring themes of Catalan nationalism.

Starting in 1975, as a direct result of the death of Franco, women writers in Spain were liberated for the first time in the subject content for which their works could focus on. This led to them exploring things such as sexual desire and fantasy. This period marked the beginning of a self-made era where women's work was equal to that of their male contemporaries, based on the merits of their work while being created in female defined spaces. Following the death of Franco, the most important novel published was by a woman. At the same time, a group of women novelist emerge to describe feminist life in post-Civil War Spain. They had started writing in the 1940s, with a second cohort joining them in the 1960s when censors began to relax.

=== Literary awards ===
Between 1945 and 1960, the Nadal Award was given to women six times. The 1958 Nadal Award had 175 entrants, of which 58 were women. The awards committee's willingness to consider women's writings on par with that of men made it particularly attractive for women, and it acquired a reputation as "fama de feminista". Among literary circles, this resulted in a loss of prestige for the prize, with it becoming known as the "premio dedal" or the thimble prize. This was a result of the patriarchal male dominated literary establishment doubting the talents of women based purely on sex related factors. Writers such as Mercedes Salisachs were particularly looked down upon by this male group as they were viewed as prize collectors, instead of serious writers.

In 1953, the Premio Fémina was created by the publisher Colenda to be a women's only equivalent to the Nadal Prize with the intention of encouraging more women to become writers. It had a prize of 50,000 pesetas. The inaugural prize, in a 63 participation deep competition, was given to Carmen Nonell for her work Zoco grande.

The Ateneo de Valladolid created Spain's second women's only literacy award in 1962, with the Premio María de Molina. The prize money was only 10,000 pesetas.

=== Feminist writers ===
Margarita Nelken, María Martínez Sierra and Carmen de Burgos had all been pre-Civil War feminist writers. Following the war, their work was subjected to strict censorship. Spanish feminists in Spain in the post Civil War period often needed to be active in exile. Works produced by these writers including Nada by Carmen Laforet in 1945 and La mujer nueva in 1955, Primera memoria by Ana María Matute in 1960. Writings of some foreign feminists did find their way to Spain, including the Le deuxième sex published in French in 1947 by Simone de Beauvoir. Inside Spain, well connected, often aristocratic Spanish feminists were sometimes able to publish their works for domestic consumption by 1948. This includes works by María Lafitte, Countess of Campo Alanaga, and Lilí Álvarez. Works by Republican pre-war feminists like Rosa Chacel and María Zambrano, who continued to write from exile, also saw their works smuggled into Spain.

Following the war, many women artists went into exile because of there leftist leanings. Those who remained often had to deal with censorship of their work by the Franco government. British Surrealist Leonora Carrington traveled to Spain in 1940, seeking to find her partner Max Ernst who had left Germany was on the run from the Gestapo. Her trip happened only months after the Civil War officially ended, and the arrest of Ernst precipitated a mental breakdown that eventually saw her put into an asylum in Santander after her father and the British government agreed. While there, she was regularly dosed with Cardiazol and restrained naked over a six month period. She was eventually released, and then went to Lisbon.

It was in the immediate start of the Franco period that Gregorio Martínez Sierra would sign a notarized declaration stating that half the works previously published under his name in the Second Republic period were actually the writings of his feminist MP Socialist wife, María de la O Lejarraca.

Some Catalan women writers who initially remained after the conclusion of the Civil War found they could not publish in Catalan in Spain and so also joined the exodus, including Mercè Rodoreda. Rosa Chacel had fled abroad and might have been able to return but refused on principle. María Zambrano was the same. Many women writers of the Second Republic period found their works banned by the government or shunned by the reading public. Some writers who remained like poet Carmen Conde found they had to completely reinvent themselves to accommodate the realities of a new Spain.

By the mid-1960s, Lidia Falcón, a Barcelona based lawyer, had established herself as a leading feminist in Spain at a time when the women's liberation movement in the country lacked a formalized ideology and structure found in other European countries and the United States. At the same time, feminists texts like Simone de Beauvoir's Le Deuxième Sexe and Betty Friedan's The Feminine Mystique began to be circulated more underground, helping to shape the emerging Women's Movement.

=== Sección Femenina ===
Sección Femenina was active in promoting both women to become writers and women's writers in general. This was a result of many of its most influential members being writers. They include Carmen de Icaza, Mercedes Formica, Mercedes Ballesteros, Eugenia Serrano and Ángeles Villarta. Many women writers got their first opportunity to write in part as a result of Sección Femenina publications. Sección Femenina published women's works, comments from readers about short stories they published, and reviews of women's writing in non-Sección Femenina publications.

One Sección Femenina publication casually refers to these women, stating, "The university has seen the arrival of these girls who study happily, write novels and organize group activities and have overcome the traditional passive attitude of their predecessors as they follow the route of intelligent to become part of a minority in our nation's life."

=== Lesbian literature ===
Spanish lesbian literature has three main periods. The first is from 1964 to 1975, during the last years of Francoist Spain. The second is the transition period of 1975 to 1985. The last period was from 1985 to the present.

Novels featuring lesbian characters in Francoist Spain included Ana María Matute's 1964 novel The Soldiers Cry at Night (Spanish: Los soldados lloran de noche). The lesbian character is featured as a morally reprehensible woman. The next major novel was the 1967 Premio Nadal finalist The Last Summer in the Mirror (Spanish: El útimo verano en el espejo) by Teresa Barbero, where the lesbian couple is portrayed as being bad women who struggle to conform with their social reality. The next major novel is Julia, published by Ana María Moix in 1969. The main lesbian character expresses sexual desires for other women including her aunt and a professor. Celia Bites the Apple (Spanish: Celia muerde la manzana) by María Luz Malecón in 1972 implies through its lesbian characters that being a lesbian is a result of trauma or people who provide a bad influence on their lives. Time of the Cherries (Spanish: Tiempo de cerezas) by Montserret Roig in 1976 is an example of the cliche of students in an all girls school having lesbian sexual experiences.

During the 1960s, Ester Tusquets and her brother Oscar were the owners and influential forces behind the left leaning antidictatorial publisher Editorial Lumen. Starting in 1968, following the departure of Oscar, the publisher began publishing works by gay men, women in general and lesbians specifically, along with foreign works, cultural theory texts and children's stories.

The first major out lesbian writer was Andrea Luca. Gloria Fuertes, Ana María Moix, Ana Rosetti, Ester Tusquets, Carme Riera, Elena Fortún and Isabel Franc were all in the closet in Spain or the first stages of the transition. Lesbian writers did not start to come out until the 1990s.

Despite the liberalization of Spanish society in the immediate post-transition period, literature featuring lesbian characters tended to conform to historical type of being secondary figures and representing insubordination against oppressive heteronormative societal norms.

== Comics ==
Spanish comics followed an established European tradition dating to the 1900s, utilizing the styles of Rodolphe Töpffer and Wilhelm Busch. Comics developed concurrently with mass culture, especially that being exported by the United States. Spanish comics did not use the American model. First getting popular during the pre-Civil War period, Spanish comics were inserts in satirical and children's magazines. They were known as tebeo. Tebeo is a phonetic adaptation of TBO, a long-running (1917–1983) Spanish comic book magazine. Elena Fortún's works, especially those about Celia, a young girl who questions adults and the world around her in ways that were both ingenuous and innocent, were popular in pre-Francoist Spain; they offered veiled criticism of bourgeois society.

In the early Francoist period, comic production was limited and easily controlled by the state. They reproduced the gender roles advocated by the Francoist government, being used to push this ideology onto children as part of a lifelong push for people to become readers. This included by creating specialized markets for both boys and girls, where comics were included as part of gender segregated primary education. Despite Franco's controls, the 1940s and 1950s are considered a golden age of Spanish comics, and many titles were at the height of their popularity. In comics for girls, "the woman was taught to suffer and hope that, with the passage of time, the high divine design of motherhood could be fulfilled." Mis Chicas, a comic for girls, was first published in 1942. It would become a model for many comics for girls going forward. The magazine was "inserted ideologically in the environment of educational separation that was advocated officially in the post-war Spanish." The comics would popularize the names of Azucena, Ardillita, Margarita, Florita, lupita and Mariló in a new generation of Spanish youth. The comics gave beauty tips, included recipes and gave behavioral advice.

During the 1950s, as a result of American troops being stationed in Spain, American comics began to impact the Spanish comic scene. Daily newspapers would begin carrying a daily comic strip. Still, the government imposed the 1952 Infant and Juvenile Press Norms (Spanish: Normas sobre la Prensa Infantil y Juvenile) to make sure that comics did not encourage female emancipation. Divorce could not be depicted. Women could not be shown as being deceptive towards men. During the 1950s, the focus shifted from rural life to industrial life. It then soon transitioned to the world of fantasy. Despite this, female characters continued to be virtuous, waiting for the right man to come along for her to marry.

Questions around gender and women's roles in society began to appear in comics during the 1970s. Consequently, the nature of female characters began to change. Women in comics became less sexually objectified and began to take on more dimension, not being passive characters. Anna María Moix discussed in a 1976 edition of Vindicación Feminista about how comics were a reflection of culture, serving as a modern form of fables and myths that had "an educational purpose in the induction of norms, behaviors and codes of values." Analysis of women's comics was first done in 1975 with El cómic femenino en España. Arte sub y anulación by Juan Antonio Ramírez. It primarily focused on pre-1950s Spanish comics.

Second-wave feminism was manifested in Spanish comics in two ways. The first was that it increased the number of women involved in comics production as writers and artists. The second was it transformed how female characters were portrayed, making women less passive and less likely to be purely sexual beings.

== Newspapers and magazines ==
The number of and variety of opinions in newspapers greatly declined in Francoist Spain from the Second Republic period. Women were regular contributors to Spanish newspapers and magazines from 1940 to 1975. Lidia Falcón wrote of this period, "Literature continues to be the poorest and most lowly of intellectual pursuits." Popular magazines for young women included Mis chicas (1941-1950), Florita (1949-1961), Sissi (1958-1967) and Lily (1970-1977).

¡Hola!, Spain's most popular and typical Spanish gossip magazine, was first published in 1944. It would continue to be the best selling magazine of its type until the mid-1990s when it was replaced by Pronto. Most of the readership of this type of magazine was female. Women were initially attracted to this type of magazine because they allowed people into the private lives of celebrities without pathologizing people's lives or condemning them as social problems.

Abortion was not allowed to be discussed in newspapers, only by male medical doctors. During the 1940 in Aragon, there were almost no references abortion. The few references that did used euphemisms. One example was in an article by Pedro Galán Bergua in Heraldo de Aragón on 1 January 1942 "The evil is not in those who marry, but in the married who are satisfied with the reduced offspring and go to methods condemned by God and for the country." State controlled or supported religious, medical, legislative and newspapers sources from the 1940s give an impression that all women accepted the imposition of the state around the topic of abortion and its relation to the need for the maintenance of the population size. Despite this, one estimate in 1943 by Matemólogo de la Sanidad Nacional Angel Clavero Núñez estimated one abortion for every three live births.

The first opposition press in Spain was created in 1963 with the founding of Cuadernos para el Diálogo that would continue in print until 1978. In 1964, Spanish exile women began publishing Mujeres Libres again. The magazine Vindicación Feminista as published between 1976 and 1979. Coming out after the death of Franco, it was the first militant feminist publication to be published in Spain since the 1930s. Poder y Libertad replaced Vindicación Feminista following the ratification of the new Spanish constitution in 1978.

== Radio ==
During the first thirty years of Francoist Spain, the dominant medium for consumers was radio. Radio was very popular with women in the 1940s because it could be listened to in the private domain, but also collectively at places like work. The Spanish government took advantage of this by using sentimental music to indoctrinate women. Mundo femenino, Consultorio Femenino de Marta Regina, Radio Fémina, and La hora de Francis were all radio programs aimed at women between 1947 and 1984. They regularly attracted total listeners of between 25,000 and 30,000 listeners. The 1950s saw the introduction of serialized narratives on Spanish radio. They included Llamas de redención, Se abren las nubes, La sangre es roja, La segunda esposa, La verdad escondida, Sangre negra, and Lo que nunca somos. These radio series were also popular with women listeners.

Starting in the 1940s, women began to become much more involved in journalism, with their participation accelerating into the 1980s. By that time, it was not unusual to hear women on the radio or see them on the television. Starting in May 1946, Sección Feminina, in conjunction with their magazine Ventanal, began an hour long Monday night weekly radio program that focused on women's writers. Their first interview was with Rosa María Cajal. They would also interview Blanca Espinar, Dolores Pérez Camarero, María José Pomar, Carmen Martín de la Escalara and María Antonia Morales. Despite their intention of promoting women's writers, most of their interviews and commentary were often in support of state goals, namely in reinforcing women as being passive with their primary role being wives and mothers, not writers.

Radio would reach its peak importance in Spain for women during the 1950s. It served as an important integration tool for women who moved from the rural countryside to urban areas.

== Television ==
Television Española (TVE) began in 1956 with an hour of daily programs. One year later, in 1957, TVE had five hours of daily programming. In this early period, it was primarily funded by the state. By 1963, this had changed with 92% of its funding coming from commercial activities while producing 66 hours of programming a week.

Victoria Prego began her journalism career in 1974 working for TVE in the international section. By 1976, she headed the department. She moved to London in 1977 where she became the London RTVE correspondent. At the time, there were few women working for the organization on air as tv or radio correspondents. Even those with news gathering roles were often forced to complete menial tasks by their male dominated newsrooms.

== Movies ==
Movies were generally condemned by the Catholic Church as they saw them all as subversive towards the Church, the state and the role of women.

Dubbing became a feature early on in Spanish cinema. This was a result of two factors. The first was Spain had high rates of illiteracy. The second was it was easier for movie distributors to add a new sound track than it was for them to add subtitles to foreign films. This policy was formalized into law in 1941, along with the requirement that all foreign film distributors have a license to show the movie. Francoist Spain argued in requiring this that it was needed to preserve both Spanish language and Spanish culture. They wanted to also make sure that Hollywood did not negatively influence Spanish women by making them think that a woman had an important role outside the home.

In Francoist approved domestic films, women were often portrayed as chaste, saintly figures who submitted to male authority. Women could not see their everyday domestic life depicted on film. Exceptions to this norm included roles played by Aurora Buaista, and Spanish folk singers Juanita Reina and Lola Flores. These exceptions though were largely limited to allowing women to be represented as people with personalities in a music only context. There were a few domestic films in the 1950s which broke this mold, including Manuel Mur Oti's 1957 movie The Battalion of Shadows, featuring a group of women living in tenement housing. Movies featuring women as Madonna like mother figures include the 1949 film Little Matters, the 1951 film Burrows (Spanish: Surcos), and the 1979 film Mama Turns 100. This image of women would not begin to change in Spanish movies until the early 1960s. Women were also sometimes featured in Spanish films of the 1940s and 1950s as whores, offering a counterpoint to the sainted Spanish woman. It was not until the 1960s that these two views of women began to merge, with distinctions between type being less important to the narrative.

Starting in the 1950s, foreign movies in Spain presented women with images of beautiful and glamorous women who had their own agency. This image conflicted with the state presented image, which demanded women surrender agency to their husbands and fathers and become mothers. These movies also served to bring Spanish women out of their international isolation. They also helped spur a generation of younger women to question their place in society and decisions made by their mothers. This would later be a factor in bringing about large scale social changes during the transition. Because of censorship, movies deemed offensive in Spain it could not be viewed in the country. One of the methods to get around this was for Spaniards to take organized tours to French towns like Perpignan where they could watch these films. These buses would often form large caravans traversing the border.

One of the biggest female stars of Spanish cinema in the late 1950s was Sara Montiel, who despite playing morally unobjectionable roles was still sexualized by producers where possible by highlighting her voluptuous form in costume. As Montiel's characters were viewed as being more three dimensional, she found many female fans.

Natalie Wood, Audrey Hepburn and Julie Andrews were some of the stars of the screen during the 1960s in Spain. They represented the idea of the fragile and innocent woman that the government support. It was not until the end of the 1960s that Audrey Hepburn, Sonia Bruno, Concha Velasco, Teresa Gimpera and Sara Montiel began to appear in Spanish cinema, portraying women as strong and independent.

== Music and dance ==
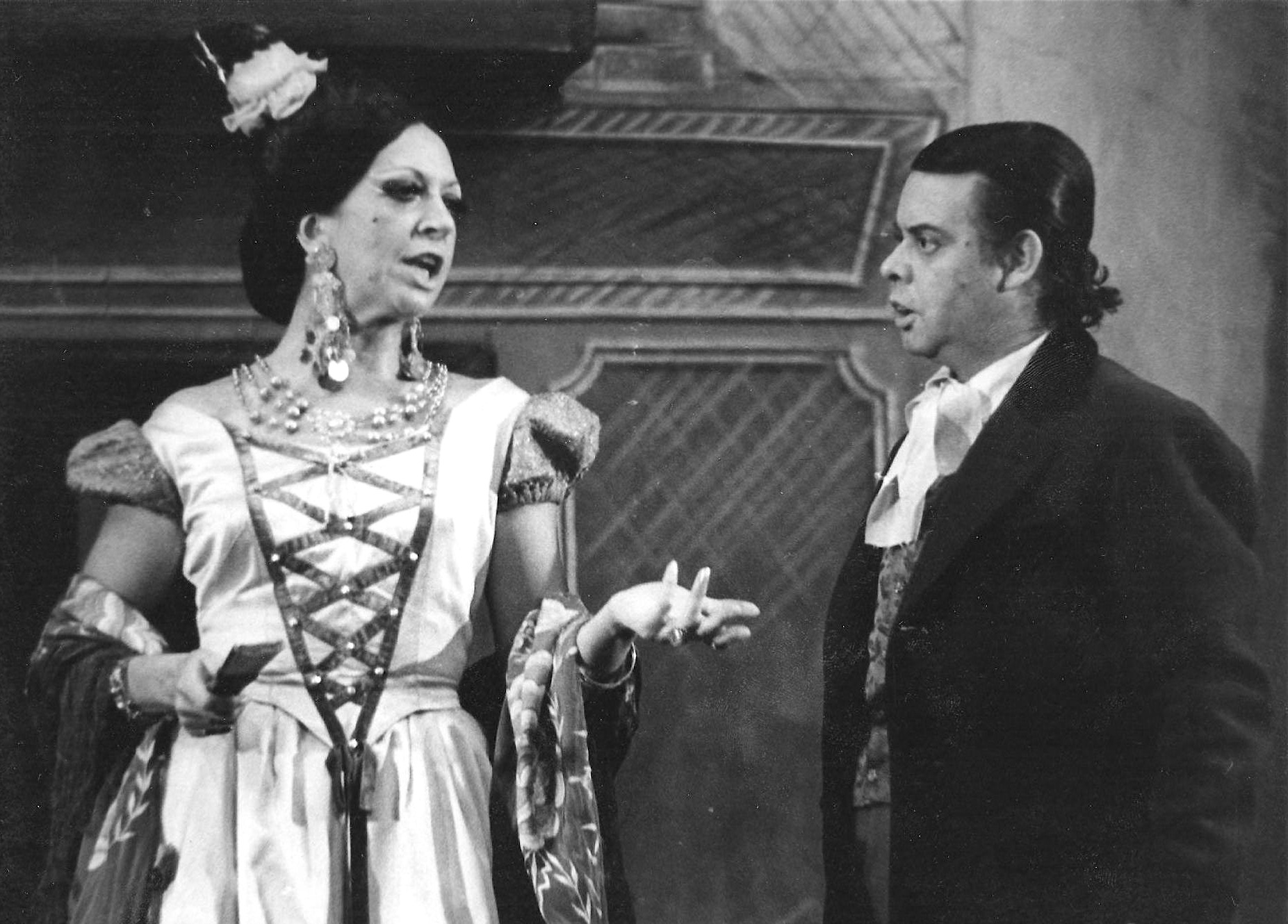
Marisol Lacalle and Segundo García in the zarzuela Doña Francisquita.

Some forms of music were openly tolerated and supported in Spain, though expression within these genres was subject to censorship and artists were not fully independent. These included zarzuela, flamenco, copla and pasodoble. They essentially became stuck in time during the Francoist period. In small towns like Picassent and Silla, the people who were allowed to show off their singing skills were primarily men, as it was viewed as unseemly for women to put themselves forward in this way. A major theme in traditional songs became the female body and the beauty of a woman's virginity being protected. In small towns, musical life would often center around the Church.

Sección Feminina had groups dedicated to music and dance. They were less about promoting and encouraging music than they were about using both music and dance to reinforce government sanctioned gender roles. They only supported traditional Spanish music styles.

Dance was particularly problematic in this period. National Catholicism taught that dance was a moral and social ill, that encouraged the mixing of the sexes. At the same time, dance was viewed as hugely important for creating a form of social cohesion and towards social activities.

== The stage ==
Ana Diosdado became Spain's most important contemporary woman playwright. She started out as a novelist, publishing her first work in 1964. Starting in 1970, in the later stages of Francoism, she switched to writing plays. Olvida los tambores was written and performed on Spanish television in 1970. Los comuneros was written in 1974 and used the reign of Carlos I to act as a historical allegory to criticize the Francoist government. Yours for the Asking (Spanish: Usted también podría disfrutar de ella) was a critique of a consumerist society that manipulated women. Her works would continue into the post-Franco period and well into the 1990s.

== Advertisements ==
Advertisements were used by the Franco government to further perpetuate their vision of the ideal Spanish women. Advertisements for working class women in the early Franco period included ones for hygiene and cleaning products, food substitutes, and pharmaceutical products. Upper class women were targeted with advertisements for many luxury products.

In 1975, the UN International Year of Women, Banco de Bilbao made a television advertisement encouraging women to open accounts with them that said, "That determined walk is the symbol of the woman of our day, of the responsible woman who works and lives her time. And to her, for the first time, a bank addresses this message of friendship, this tribute of admiration."

== Pornography ==
In the early transition period, Spanish pornography was often cruder and had inferior production standards than internationally produced pornography. Consequently, foreign produced pornography dominated the internal Spanish market.

While the issue of pornography was of interest to feminists in the transition period, it was not center to their political activities as they had other goals they wanted to work on first before seriously visiting the topic. Most of the condemnations of pornography in this period consequently came from conservative women opposed to sex more generally and seeking to return to a more traditionally family centered period.

== State sanctioned works ==
Spain approved women's instructional manuals during the 1950s and 1960s followed the style of Spanish Baroque conduct manuals. Themes in these works included the marriage market in Spain, and how to navigate it in religious, political and sexual contexts. In their later period, they highlighted the growing gender conflicts in the family. Guerra Gallego and Carmen Sebastián published some of the most popular fictional books that prepared Spanish women for married life. Sebastián's works represented a Vatican supported perspective of marriage. El Angel de Hogar was a series of French books by Catholic publisher Desclee de Brouwer that were translated into Spanish during the 1950s and 1960s that served as guidebooks for women in how they should behave in marriage. Some books included René Boigelt's El Matrimonio: El Libro de la novia, and El Matrimonio: El libro del jóven 17 a 20 años. The series also included works on motherhood.

Censorship examples

Attention censors! All photographs on sports championships Women 's Section, where the comrades are teaching knees are prohibited and therefore must be struck.

Ads concerning the sale of photographs of Rita Hayworth in the movie Gilda are strictly prohibited . Please take the necessary measures so that no announcement appears in the indicated newspapers of your jurisdiction.

== Censorship ==
Censorship became a new reality for many women writers in Francoist Spain. Publishers were subject to government control. The Catholic Church was highly influential in what was allowed to be published. Depictions of women were censored by the media in Francoist Spain. Suicide, abortion, nudity, drug use, and alcohol and alcoholism were often considered taboo subjects that would warrant censorship by the Spanish State. Starting in 1962, censorship across Spain began to officially relax. Further changes to relax censorship occurred four years later in 1966.

One of the ways to journalists would get around censorship was to avoid direct criticism of Franco and the military. Scholars such as Michael Ugarte suggest that censorship may have been advantageous to some writers, as it required the "sharpening of the writer's traditional tools: irony, allusion, ambiguity, association, multiple signification and other devices that enhance the sophistication of the writing and the reader's reception of it."

Children's magazines and women's magazines were heavily censored in Francoist Spain. Authors who faced censorship included foreign writers like Nadine Gordimer, Margarite Duras, Doris Lessing, Dacia Maraini, Mary McCarthy, Carson McCullers, Nathalie Sarraute and Mary Wollstonecraft. The writings of Frederica Montseny and Dolores Ibárruri were particularly a target of censors, with the government also targeting both women who had fled abroad for their own safety. Despite her leftist leanings, Carmen Conde took care to try to represent all the victims of the Spanish Civil War in the 1967 Spanish language edition of Mientras los hombres mueren in Obra poética so as to avoid to potential that the government would censor her work.

Despite lifting of censorship, many translated texts continued to contain censored versions well into the 2010s. This includes Grace Kelly and Clark Gable's 1953 film Mogambo. In its Spanish dubbed release had a husband and wife replaced with two brothers to avoid representing adultery in the film. Whole parts of the film were also removed. This censorship still exists in Spanish dubbed versions.
