= David Uclés =

Spanish novelist (1990)

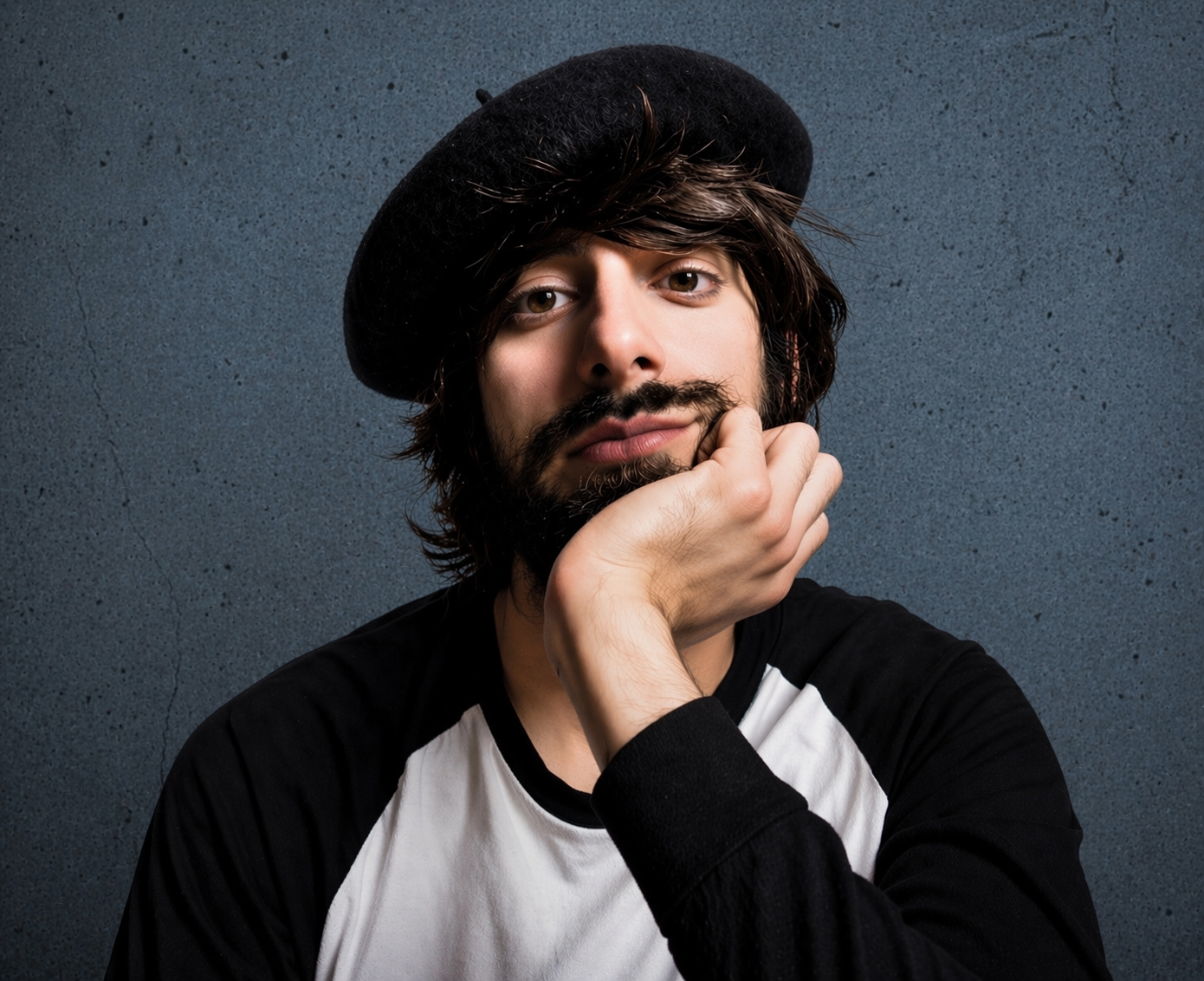
- Born: January 21, 1990 (age 36); Úbeda, Spain
- Occupations: Writer, musician, illustrator, and translator

David Uclés Vílchez (Úbeda, 21 January 1990) is a Spanish writer, musician, illustrator, and translator. In 2024 he published La península de las casas vacías (The Peninsula of Empty Houses), which became a bestseller. In 2026 his novel La ciudad de las luces muertas (The City of Dead Lights) won the Nadal Prize. He is a Favorite Son of his birthplace.

== Biography ==
David Uclés studied linguistics in Córdoba, Münster (Germany), and Granada, and worked as a teacher of Spanish, German, and English in Germany, France, and Switzerland. He also lived in England and spent several years in Galicia, the Basque Country, and Catalonia. He currently resides in Madrid.

His work fall within the literary movement of magical realism, and among his literary influences are Günter Grass, Gabriel García Márquez, José Saramago, Mercè Rodoreda, Miguel de Unamuno, Salman Rushdie, Edgar Hilsenrath, and Olga Tokarczuk.

In 2019, he received the Complutense Prize for Literature in the narrative category for his first work, El llanto del león, a theatrical novel that recounts the last conversations between a father suffering from cancer and his ten-year-old son. The president of the jury was Luis Mateo Díez, winner of the 2023 Cervantes Prize. In 2020, he published Emilio & Octubre with the Dos Bigotes publishing house, a novel that tells the love story of two men from the birth of one to the death of the other, in the near future, in which the protagonists enter three-dimensional paintings in museums and travel through art across Europe.

His third novel, La península de las casas vacías, published by Ediciones Siruela in March 2024, narrates the entire Spanish Civil War in a magical realist style. It is the result of fifteen years of work and an exhaustive journey of documentation and memory throughout Spain. For its creation, it received the Montserrat Roig and Leonardo scholarships.

It was awarded the Cálamo Best Book of the Year Award 2024, the Andalusia Critics' Award 2025, the Espartaco Award from the Semana Negra de Gijón for Best Historical Novel, the Kelvin 505 Award for Best Fantasy Novel, the Dulce Chacón Award 2025, the Arcebispo Juan de San Clemente Literary Prize, the Festival 42 Prize for Best Novel in Spanish, the Andalucía de las Letras 2025, the El Corte Inglés Un Año de Libros 2025 Prize for Best Fiction Book, and was a finalist for the VI Mario Vargas Llosa Biennial Novel Prize. It was also the Spanish candidate for the 2025 European Union Prize for Literature. It reached 30 editions in less than two years and sold over 300,000 copies, becoming one of the best-selling books of 2024 and 2025. The novel is being translated into 15 languages, including French, Portuguese, German, Italian, Danish, Lithuanian, Romanian, Czech, Galician, Albanian, Serbian, and Greek. It was selected as the second-best book of the year by the jury of Babelia's annual list (2024).

In February 2026, he published his fourth novel, La ciudad de las luces muertas (The City of Dead Lights), which recreates a dark Barcelona through which a hundred artists and writers from different eras pass, all maintaining a relationship with the city. The literary project was begun in 2021 and uses the writer Carmen Laforet as a central figure. The novel won the Nadal Prize, submitted under the pseudonym Oriol Arce and the title Ruge otro día estival (Another Summer Day Roars). Uclés dedicated the literary award to the writers Mercè Rodoreda, Montserrat Roig, and Laforet.

In addition, David Uclés has been named Favorite Son of Úbeda by the City Council of Úbeda and has won the Jaén Paraíso Interior Award granted by the Provincial Council of Jaén.

As a musician, he sings and composes on the harp, piano, accordion, and guitar. He has composed the music for various plays, documentaries, and exhibitions (Tabacalera, University of Paris, LesGaiCineMad).

== Works ==
=== Novels ===
- El llanto del león (The Lion's Cry), 2019
- Emilio y Octubre (Emilio and Octubre), 2020
- La península de las casas vacías (The Peninsula of Empty Houses), 2024
- La ciudad de las luces muertas (City of Dead Lights), 2026

== Awards ==
=== 2026 ===
- Nadal Prize for the Novel, for La ciudad de las luces muertas (City of Dead Lights).

=== 2025 ===
- Andalusia Prize for Literary Criticism.
- Finalist and Spanish nominee for the European Union Prize for Literature.
- Espartaco Prize (Semana Negra de Gijón) for Best Historical Novel.
- Kelvin 505 Award for Best Fantasy Novel.
- Dulce Chacón Prize for Spanish Narrative.
- Finalist for the 6th Mario Vargas Llosa Biennial Novel Prize.
- Arcebispo Juan de San Clemente Literary Prize.
- Festival 42 Award for Best Novel in Spanish.
- El Corte Inglés “Un Año de Libros” Award 2025 for Best Fiction Book.
- Andalusia Prize for Literature.
- Jaén Person of the Year Award (Culture).
- 9th Corazón de Olavide Award.

=== 2024 ===
- Spanish Ministry of Culture Grant for Literary Creation, for Niños jugando en las ruinas (Children Playing in the Ruins).
- Cálamo Award – Book of the Year (2024), for La península de las casas vacías (The Peninsula of Empty Houses).

=== 2022 ===
- Montserrat Roig Literary Creation Grant, awarded by the Barcelona City Council, for La península de las casas vacías (The Peninsula of Empty Houses).
- Leonardo Grant for Literary Creation and Performing Arts, BBVA Foundation, for La península de las casas vacías (The Peninsula of Empty Houses).

=== 2021 ===
- Cristina Tomi Short Narrative Prize, awarded by the Hispano-Romanian Association “Salva”: First Mention for La filósofa en el café y el pintor en el prostíbulo (The Philosopher in the Café and the Painter in the Brothel).

=== 2020 ===
- Honorary Mention (Accésit), 10th Dr. Pedro Zarco Short Story Prize, Aula Social of Hospital Clínico San Carlos, for Bicardio Reis.

=== 2019 ===
- Complutense Prize for Literature, for El llanto del león (The Lion's Cry).
