= Benet Casablancas =

Catalan composer, musicologist and music pedagogue

Benet Casablancas Domingo (born 2 April 1956 in Sabadell) is a Catalan composer and musicologist.

== Biography ==
Casablancas started to study music in Barcelona's Conservatory of Music and privately with Josep Soler Sardà and then moved to Vienna, where he attended lessons in the Vienna Academy of Music with Friedrich Cerha and Karl Heinz Füssl. He also graduated in philosophy in Universidad Autònoma de Barcelona (1982) and has a PhD in musicology by the same university. He has always combined composition with teaching and research.

== Career ==
In 2000, Casablancas published the book “El humor en la música” and in 2002, he was appointed Academic Director of the Conservatori Superior de Música del Liceu of Barcelona.

His “New Epigrams” (1997) represented Spain at the ISMC World Music Days Vilnius in 2008. Also in 2008, the “Seven Scenes of Hamlet” had its UK premiere in a performance by the BBC Symphony Orchestra, and in 2009, his work “Alter Klang. Impromptu for Orchestra” was played by the National Youth Orchestra of the Netherlands, the Malmö Symphony Orchestra, and the Belgian National Orchestra. In the chamber field, the Arditti Quartet gave the premiere of Casablancas' "String Quartet n.3". In December 2009, his set of "Haiku" premiered in Japan.

In the last years, several monographic concerts have taken place in Vienna, Madrid, and Barcelona. They were followed, in February 2010, by a Composer's Portrait by Perspectives Ensemble in Miller Theatre of New York, conducted by Angel Gil-Ordoñez, which included the US Premiere of the "Seven Scenes from Hamlet" (with the actor Chuck Cooper in the soloist role) and the World Premiere of the new work, “Four Darks in Red”, after Rothko, commissioned by Miller Theatre with the collaboration of the Foundation for Iberian Music. There has been another premiere planned for 2010, that of his “Chamber Concerto n.1 for Clarinet and Chamber Orchestra”, which has been commissioned by the Royal Liverpool Philharmonic Orchestra. Also in 2010, his work “New Epigrams” was performed by The London Simfonietta, in Barcelona and in Madrid.

Next commitments include new commissions and performances by Ensemble 88 Maastricht, Ensemble Cantus Croatia, Birmingham Contemporary Music Group conducted by Oliver Knussen and the London Philharmonic Orchestra, conducted by Vladimir Jurowski. He has worked on commissions for the pianist Diego Fernández Magdaleno (homage to Jordi Savall) and the Foundation for Iberian Music at The City University New York.

In 2011, Benet Casablancas signed an exclusive publishing agreement with The Music Sales Group (UME). Previous publishers include Tritó Edicions, EMEC and Boileau.

In 2013, Casablancas was awarded the Spanish National Music Prize, granted by the Spanish Ministry of Culture.

Benet Casablancas was appointed Composer in Residence of the Barcelona Symphony Orchestra and National Orchestra of Catalonia for the 2013–14 and 2014–15 seasons. Currently he works in several commissions: CNDM de Madrid (for the Joven Orquesta Nacional de España (JONDE) and the Festival de Granada), and Ensemble Reconsil in Vienna. Recently he has received the commission of a new opera, "L´enigma di Lea", based on the original idea and libretto by Rafael Argullol, by the Gran Teatre del Liceu in Barcelona to be premiered next 2016–2017 Season.

== Aesthetics ==
In 1990, the composition of the first piece of the “Epigrams” series was a turning point in Casablancas' musical language; it evolved from the early influence of the formal techniques of serialism towards wider and more sensual idiom, which shows a renewed harmonical, textural and instrumental thinking. Critics have praised his music for keeping balance between constructional rigour and expressive strength, as well as for its timbrical richness. Casablancas’ output covers a wide range of genres, although recently he has been very prolific in the orchestral field; since 2005, he has written “The Dark Backward of Time” (after “The Tempest” by Shakespeare), “Alter Klang. Impromptu for Orchestra” (after Klee), and “Darkness visible. Nocturnal for orchestra” (after Milton). Casablancas's inspiration in paintings by artists like Paul Klee, Mark Rothko or Pablo Picasso is also one of his personal aims, in his search of creative feed-back between different artistic fields. At the same time, he attains a new kind of rhythmical freedom and formal fluidity, close to the character of free improvisation, together with a new sense of harmonic brightness, in such pianistic works like the three "Haiku" (2007) or the "Impromptu" (2009), commissioned by the Finnish pianist Kristiina Junttu. The opera "L'enigma di Lea" (text: Rafael Argullol), premiered with great success at the Gran Teatre del Liceu (Barcelona) in February 2019, constitutes a broad and successful synthesis of his technical procedures and his aesthetic universe.

== Key works ==
- Five Interludes -Quasi variazioni- (1983; string quartet)
- Seven Scenes from Hamlet (1989; chamber orchestra)
- Epigrams (1994; sextet)
- New Epigrams (1997; chamber orchestra)
- Scherzo (2000; piano)
- Three Epigrams (2000; orchestra)
- The Dark Backward of Time (2005; orchestra)
- Tre Divertimenti (2006; piano duet)
- Intrada sobre el nom de Dalí: Variacions sobre tres notes (2006; orchestra)
- Alter Klang (2006; orchestra)
- Three Haiku (2008; piano)
- Jo tem la nit... (2008; choir mixed and piano)
- String Quartet No.3 (2009; string quartet)
- Darkness Visible (2009; orchestra)
- Four Darks in Red, after Rothko (2009; chamber orchestra)
- Impromptu (2009; piano)
- Dove of Peace: Homage to Picasso (Chamber Concert No.1 for clarinet and ensemble) (2010; chamber orchestra)
- Six Glosses on texts by Cees Nooteboom (2010; flute, clarinet, percussion, piano, violin, violoncello)
- "L'enigma di Lea" (2018; opera)

== Selected recordings ==
- Epigrams, String Trio, Introduction, Cadenza and Aria, String Quartet nr. 2, New Epigrams, Album Leaf, Two Notations, Aphorism, Three Epigrams. Various performers (London Sinfonietta, Arditti Quartet, Barcelona SO, BCN 216, etc.) EMEC/Fundació Música Contemporània E-068 (2005)
- Five Interludes for String Quartet, Two Piano Pieces, Three Piano Pieces, Scherzo, Mouvement for Trio, Little Night music, Two Songs, Celebration. Various performers. Columna Música 1CM0112 (2004)
- Piano Music (Three Bagatelles, Tombeau, Three Divertimenti for piano duet, Album Leaf, etc.). Jordi Masó, Miquel Villalba. Naxos 8.570757 (2008)
- The Dark Backward of Time, Love Poem, Intrada on the name of Dalí, Epigrams, Postlude. Barcelona Symphony Orchestra, Ofèlia Sala, cond: S. Mas. Naxos 8.579002 (2010)
- Seven Scenes from Hamlet and other chamber works. Ensemble Barcelona 216, cond: M. Valdivieso. Naxos 8.579004 (2010)
- Seven Scenes from Hamlet, Alter Klang and other orchestral and vocal works. Orquesta de la Comunidad de Madrid, Will Keen, actor, cond: J. R. Encinar. Stradivarius STR 33828 (2010)
- Complete Strings Quartets and Trio. Arditti Quartet. Tritó TD 0077 (2010)
- Orchestral Works. Orquesta Nacional de España, cond: Josep Pons. Anemos C33010 (2010)

== Honours and awards ==
- I & III Tribunas Fundación Juan March of Madrid (1982, 1984)
- Ferrán Sors (1984)
- II Musician's Accord New York (1986)
- XVI Premio Internacional Òscar Esplà (1988)
- Spanish National Recording Prize, awarded by Ministerio de Cultura (1988)
- Ciutat de Barcelona (1992)
- Composer's Arena (Foundation Gaudeamus Amsterdam, 1996)
- National Prize of Music (Generalitat de Catalunya, 2007)
- Finalist of the Prix de Composition Musicale, given by the Fondation Prince Pierre de Monaco, with the work “The Dark Backward of Time”
