= Rafael Sánchez Ferlosio =

Spanish writer (1927–2019)

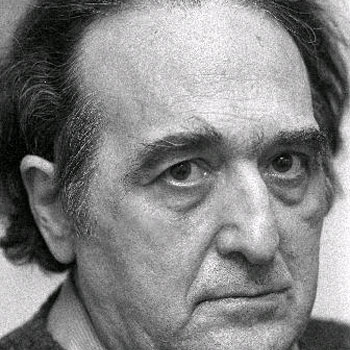
- Rafael Sánchez Ferlosio
- Born: 4 December 1927; Rome, Italy
- Died: 1 April 2019 (aged 91); Madrid, Spain
- Occupation: writer

Rafael Sánchez Ferlosio (4 December 1927 – 1 April 2019) was a Spanish writer. In 2004 he was awarded the Premio Cervantes for his literary oeuvre.

He was married to fellow writer Carmen Martín Gaite.

== Writing ==
Sánchez Ferlosio was born in Rome, Italy. His father, Rafael Sánchez Mazas, a minor writer, was a founder and leader of Falange. Sánchez Ferlosio won the Nadal Award for his novel El Jarama, a realistic depiction of a weekend party. He contributed to the awakening of Spanish literature after the end of the Civil War, working alongside young writers such as Juan Goytisolo and Ana María Matute.

After the success of his first book, he renounced writing for twenty years. He never gave the reason for his silence, but many critics assumed it was a form of silent opposition to the Francoist State.

He came back to writing with essays on cultural issues. He returned to fiction in 1986 with El testimonio de Yarfoz, which is set in an imaginary land.

He died in Madrid, aged 91.

== Works ==
- Industrias y andanzas de Alfanhuí (1951)
- El Jarama (1955)
- Las semanas del jardín (1974)
- Mientras no cambien los dioses, nada ha cambiado (1986)
- El testimonio de Yarfoz (1986)
- Vendrán más años malos y nos harán más ciegos (1992)
- Non Olet (2002)
- El Geco (2005)
- Sobre la guerra (2007)
- God & Gun. Apuntes de polemología (2008)
- Guapo y sus isótopos (2009)
- Campo de retamas (2015)
