= Eva Díaz =

Eva Díaz may refer to:

- Eva Diaz (Arizona politician), American politician, Arizona state senator
- Eva Díaz (art historian) (born 1977), Puerto Rican art historian
- Eva Díaz Pérez (born 1930), Spanish teacher and mathematician
- Eva Díaz Tezanos (born 1964), Spanish politician
- Eva Díaz Torres (1943–1993), Uruguayan artist
