= Émilie Sagée =

Legendary French teacher

Émilie Sagée (3 January 1813 in Dijon, France ? - ?) was an apocryphal French teacher, who was claimed to have the ability of bilocation. That story was reported by three authors: Robert Dale Owen, the French astronomer Camille Flammarion and the Russian parapsychologist Alexander Aksakov from one direct witness, Julie de Güldenstubbe. The facts remain difficult to prove, but the story remains a classic of the annals of the paranormal and of the bilocation and doppelgänger themes.

== The story ==
The story takes place in 1845 in the "Pensionnat of Neuwelcke", an institution under the superintendence of Moravian directors. There were in that year 42 young ladies, chiefly daughters of noble Livonian families; among them Mademoiselle Julie, second daughter of the Baron de Güldenstubbe, then thirteen years of age, who tells the story.

A new French teacher was hired that year, Mademoiselle Émilie Sagée, a 32 years old French lady, from Dijon. She was of the Northern type, — a blonde, with very fair complexion, light-blue eyes, chestnut hair, slightly above the middle size, and of slender figure. In character she was amiable, quiet, and good tempered; but of an anxious disposition, and somewhat nervously excitable.

A few weeks after she first arrived, the first rumors appeared: one student might have seen her in one place while another had met her elsewhere. One day the governess was giving a lesson to a class of 13 students, including Julie de Güldenstubbe. While she was writing on a blackboard, the young ladies suddenly saw two Mademoiselles Sagée, the one by the side of the other. They were exactly alike; and they used the same gestures, only that the real person held a bit of chalk in her hand, and did actually write, while the double had no chalk; and only imitated the motion. Soon after, one of the pupils, a Mademoiselle Antonie de Wrangel, was helped by Mademoiselle Sagée. The young lady, happening to turn round and to look in an adjacent mirror, perceived two Mademoiselles Sagée hooking her dress.

Over the months, similar phenomena were still repeated. The double sometimes imitated the original exactly, and sometimes not. The most remarkable phenomenon occurred one day when the 42 students were assembled in the same room, engaged in embroidery in a spacious hall on the first floor of the principal building. Through the windows, the young ladies had noticed Mademoiselle Sagée in the garden, gathering flowers, of which she was very fond. In the room, sat another teacher, in charge of the pupils. After a time this lady had occasion to leave the room, and her arm-chair was left vacant. It remained so, however, for a short time only; for of a sudden there appeared seated in it the figure of Mademoiselle Sagée. The young ladies immediately looked into the garden and there she still was, engaged as before; only they remarked that she moved very slowly and languidly, as a drowsy or exhausted person might. Again they looked at the arm-chair, and there she sat, silent, and without motion. The students had become used to this, in a way, and two of the boldest students decided to get up and attempt to touch the apparition. They averred that they did feel a slight resistance, which they likened to that which a fabric of fine muslin or crape would offer to the touch. One of the two then passed close in front of the arm-chair, and actually through a portion of the figure. The apparition did not respond to this, or change position. At last, it gradually disappeared and then it was observed that Mademoiselle Sagée resumed, with all her usual activity, her task of flower-gathering.

This phenomenon continued throughout the whole time that Mademoiselle Sagée retained her position at Neuwelcke between 1845 and 1846. Eventually, parents began to worry about the strange events that their children told them. After 18 months, only 12 of the 42 students were left. Due to this, Sagée was asked to resign from her position. Upon being asked to do so, it is said that Sagée responded by saying in the presence of Julie de Güldenstubbe: "Ah! the nineteenth time! It is very, very hard to bear!" When asked what she meant by such an exclamation, she confessed that previous to her engagement at Neuwelcke she had been teacher in eighteen different schools, having entered the first when only 16 years of age.

After she left Neuwelcke, she went to live with a sister-in-law, who had several quiet young children. Mademoiselle de Güldenstubbe, going to see her there, learned that the children, all around three or four years of age, all knew of it; being in the habit of saying that "they saw two Aunt Emilies." Subsequently, she set out for the interior of Russia, and Mademoiselle de Güldenstubbe lost sight of her entirely.

== Sources ==
This amazing story was first published in 1860 by Robert Dale Owen in his book Footfalls on the Boundary of Another World. He claims to hold it from the direct testimony of Julie de Güldenstubbe who authorized him to mention her name and all those of the persons concerned. In 1883, the magazine Light, A Journal of Psychical, Occult, and Mystical Research published a text which it presents as the complete report of the testimony "[...] given by the Hon. Robert Dale Owen" in his book. It is actually exactly the same text, word for word. The text is not signed, but Alexander Aksakov nevertheless presents it as a complement provided by Baroness Julie de Güldenstubbe herself.

Camille Flammarion was interested in this case which fits perfectly within the scope of his research. He wrote that in 1862 he met Julie de Güldenstubbe (1827–1888) and her brother Baron Johann Ludwig von Güldenstubbe (1818–1873), who were very active in the Parisian spiritualist circles. Flammarion described them as "very sincere, perhaps a little mystical but unquestionably loyal". He notes that the Baron wrote a curious book on spirits (The Reality of Spirits and the Wonderful Phenomenon of Their Direct Writing).

Flammarion recognized the whole story was based on the unique testimony of Julie de Güldenstubbe, whose noble title of baroness did not prevent her from possessing a vivid imagination and who lived in a family acquainted with theories of the supernatural. The description of the baroness in the Daily News in 1859 reveals her to be quite exalted indeed: "very clever and amiable, but the most weird, unearthly, elfin-looking little creature imaginable."

=== Civil status searches ===
During a trip to Dijon, Camille Flammarion sought to obtain more information on the existence of Émilie Sagée. If she was 32 years old in 1845, she must have been born around 1813. He found no Sagée family in the civil status registers, but did find the birth of an Octavie Saget (which is pronounced exactly the same in French), of unknown father, born on January 3, 1813. He assumed that it was the same Émilie Sagée, whose name could have been altered by the memory of Julie de Güldenstubbe and the English transcription of Robert Dale Owen, or otherwise was voluntarily modified in order to hide her illegitimacy or cover her tracks in her 18 professorships. Moreover, no family name such as Sagée was recorded in the French civil registry between 1891 and 1990.

The registers of the civil status of the city of Dijon reported that "On January 3 at six o'clock in the morning, Marguerite Saget, aged thirty, a worker native of Orbigny, department of Haute-Marne and residing in Dijon, adult daughter, gave birth to a female child to whom she gave the first name of Octavie".

This birth certificate is the only historical clue that could authenticate the existence of Émilie Sagée (but not the story of the bilocations, only reported by Julie de Güldenstubbe). It is also surprising that no testimony has been reported regarding the 18 other jobs where she would have presented similar phenomena.

=== Boarding school location ===
The name of the Neuwelcke boarding school corresponds to Jaunveļķi in Latvian. The institution was allegedly located (57.422309°N 25.270691°E) near the village of Vaidava, located a few kilometers from the town of Wolmar (today Valmiera) in Livonia (on the territory of present-day Latvia). However, no documentation has been presented to confirm that these coordinates are the location of the infamous school. Outside of the general area described in Owen's book, the exact location of the Pensionnat of Neuwelcke and whether or not it ever existed, remains unknown.

== Artistic evocation ==
- In 1977, The Fetch, an episode of the British series Leap in the Dark was devoted to the story of Émilie Sagée, interpreted by Juliet Harmer (episode 2 of season 3)
- El Pensionado de Neuwelke, a Spanish novel, was written by José C. Vales in 2013 about Émilie Sagée
