= Elena Quiroga =

Spanish writer (1921–1995)

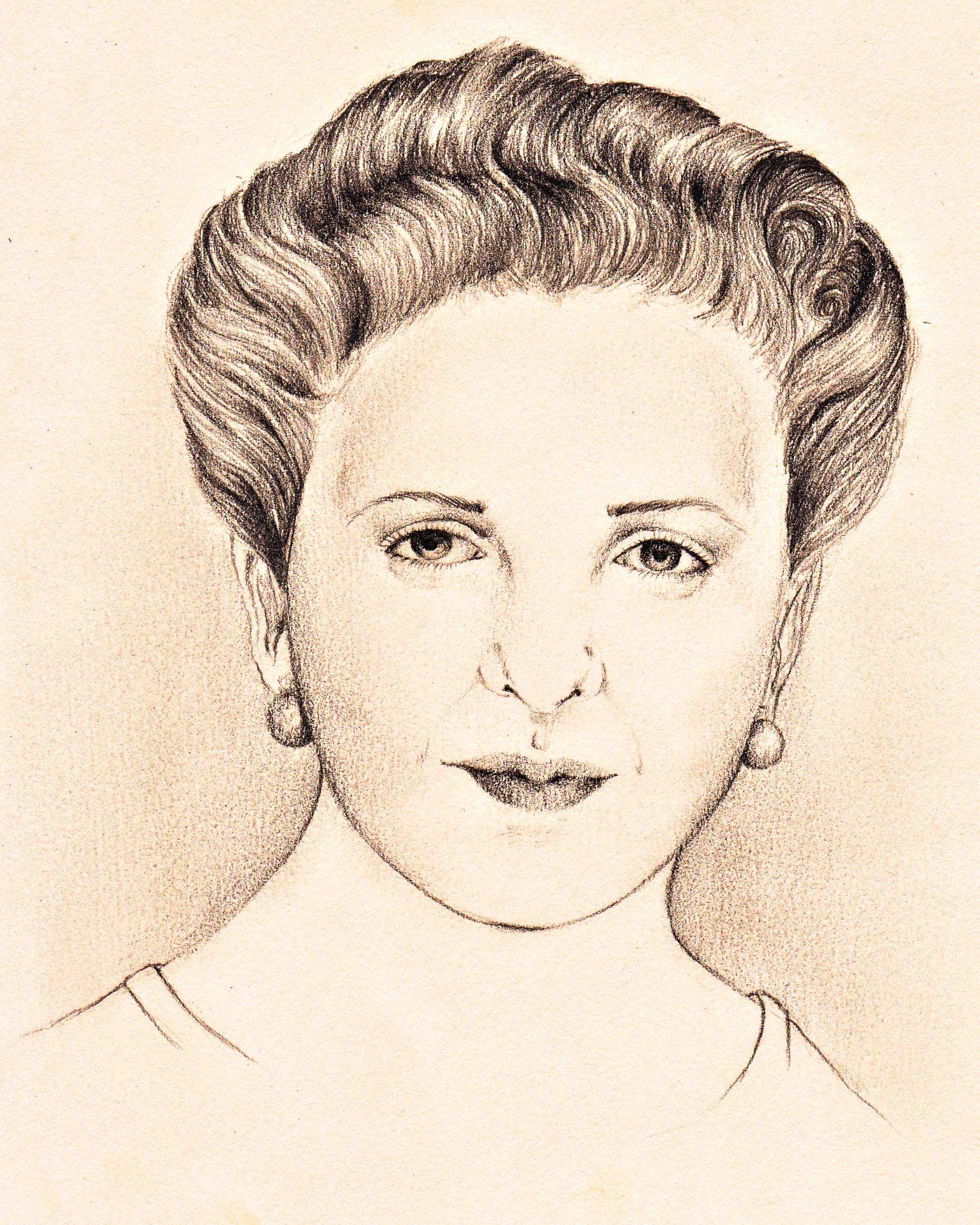
- Born: Elena Quiroga de Abarca; 26 October 1921; Santander, Old Castile, Spain
- Died: 3 October 1995 (aged 73); A Coruña, Galicia, Spain
- Occupation: Writer
- Spouse: Dalmiro de la Válgoma (m. 1950; died 1990)
- Writing career
- Genre: Novel
- Notable awards: Premio Nadal
- Literary movement: Generation of '50

Seat a of the Real Academia Española
- In office 8 April 1984 (Note: Elected on 13 January 1983) – 3 October 1995
- Preceded by: Juan Antonio de Zunzunegui
- Succeeded by: Domingo Ynduráin Muñoz

Elena Quiroga de Abarca (26 October 1921 – 3 October 1995) was a Spanish writer.

Elena Quiroga was renowned for her narrative prose work. She was considered one of the most prominent women of her time, mostly because she was preoccupied by injustice, and explored the themes of childhood and adolescence. In 1983, she became the second woman to enter the Real Academia Española (Royal Academy of the Spanish Language).

== Biography ==
Born into a wealthy family in Santander (then part of Old Castile, now in the autonomous Cantabria), Elena Quiroga lived with her father in Viloira, Galicia, and was a happy child and teenager. During her time, it was quite uncommon for women to get access to education. However, Elena Quiroga was given a high level of academic training. For that reason, ever since she was a child, she could develop her inner literary sensitivity. We can see that in her first novel that she published when she was 20, La Soledad Sonora (1949), in which she narrates the story of a woman from her adolescence until the end of her life. Even though she did not go to University, Quiroga attended free classes, and worked for many years, 4 to 5 hours a day on her books and texts.

After she married Dalmiro de la Válgoma in 1950, they moved to Madrid where she had the opportunity to enter a group of writers. They are known for having reinvented the contemporary Spanish novel of the 20th century.

On 31 August 1995, she was hospitalized in A Coruña because of a serious hip injury; she died there of a brain disease at the age of 73.

== Career ==
While she started writing at a young age, it was only when she got married that her career really began. When she moved to Madrid, she wrote an award-winning novel, Viento del Norte (1950), which is about the relationship between a young maid and her master. In this novel, Quiroga defines the keys of her following writing. Some of them are the use of intimacy about the memories of the childhood and adolescence and a well-defined plot and characters. She uses a rich, elegant and pure language in her prose. In 1952, she wrote her third novel: La Sangre. According to her editors, it gave her the status of being an extraordinary novelist because of the delicacy of her style and the interest of the problems that she deals with. It tells the story of four generations through a tree, the true main character of the book.

In 1954, Quiroga wrote Algo pasa en la calle, where she explores new and more current areas of the genre of the novel. The novel deals with love failure and a marriage break up that are settled in urban spaces. Its characters are psychologically more complex and close to the mentality of modern men.

Elena Quiroga published La Careta (1995) and La Enferma (1955), where she talks about the story of a woman who deals with psychological problems and who is abandoned by his lover. She also wrote Plácida la joven y otras narraciones (1956) and La última corrida (1958). That makes a total of eight novels published in less than ten years. This fact made her one of the most prolific Spanish writers of the moment without losing quality in her prose.

After years of an intense literary activity, her production of novels took a slower rhythm. In 1960, she published Tristura, a novel that won the award Premio de la Crítica Catalana. However, it took her five years to write another novel: Escribo tu nombre (1965), Other novels written by her are Trayecto uno, El pájaro de oro, La otra ciudad, Presente profundo (1970) and Grandes Soledades (1983).

Elena Quiroga belongs to a generation of writers whose stories about the Spanish Civil War incremented the psychological deepness in the women's testimony in that topic.

=== Real Academia Española ===
In 1983, Elena Quiroga was elected as a member of the Real Academia Española because of her brilliant career and her publications. She was the second woman in history who achieved this membership, after Carmen Conde, a writer who entered in this institution in 1978.

== Works ==
- La soledad sonora. Madrid: Espasa-Calpe, 1949.
- Viento del norte. Barcelona: Destino, 1951
- La sangre. Barcelona: Destino, 1952.
- Trayecto uno, Madrid: Tecnos, 1953.
- Algo pasa en la calle. Barcelona: Destino, 1954.
- La careta. Barcelona: Noguer, 1955.
- La enferma. Barcelona: Noguer, 1955.
- Plácida, la joven y otras narraciones. Madrid: Prensa española, 1956.
- La última corrida. Barcelona: Noguer, 1958.
- Tristura. Barcelona: Noguer, 1960.
- Carta a Cadaqués. Santander: Imp. Bedia, 1961.
- Envío a Faramello. Madrid: Raycar, 1963.
- Escribo tu nombre. Barcelona: Noguer, 1965.
- El pájaro de oro
- La otra ciudad
- Presente profundo. Barcelona: Destino, 1973.
- Grandes soledades, 1983.
- Presencia y ausencia de Álvaro Cunqueiro. Madrid: Real Academia Española (RAE), 1984.
