= Dolores Medio =

Spanish writer

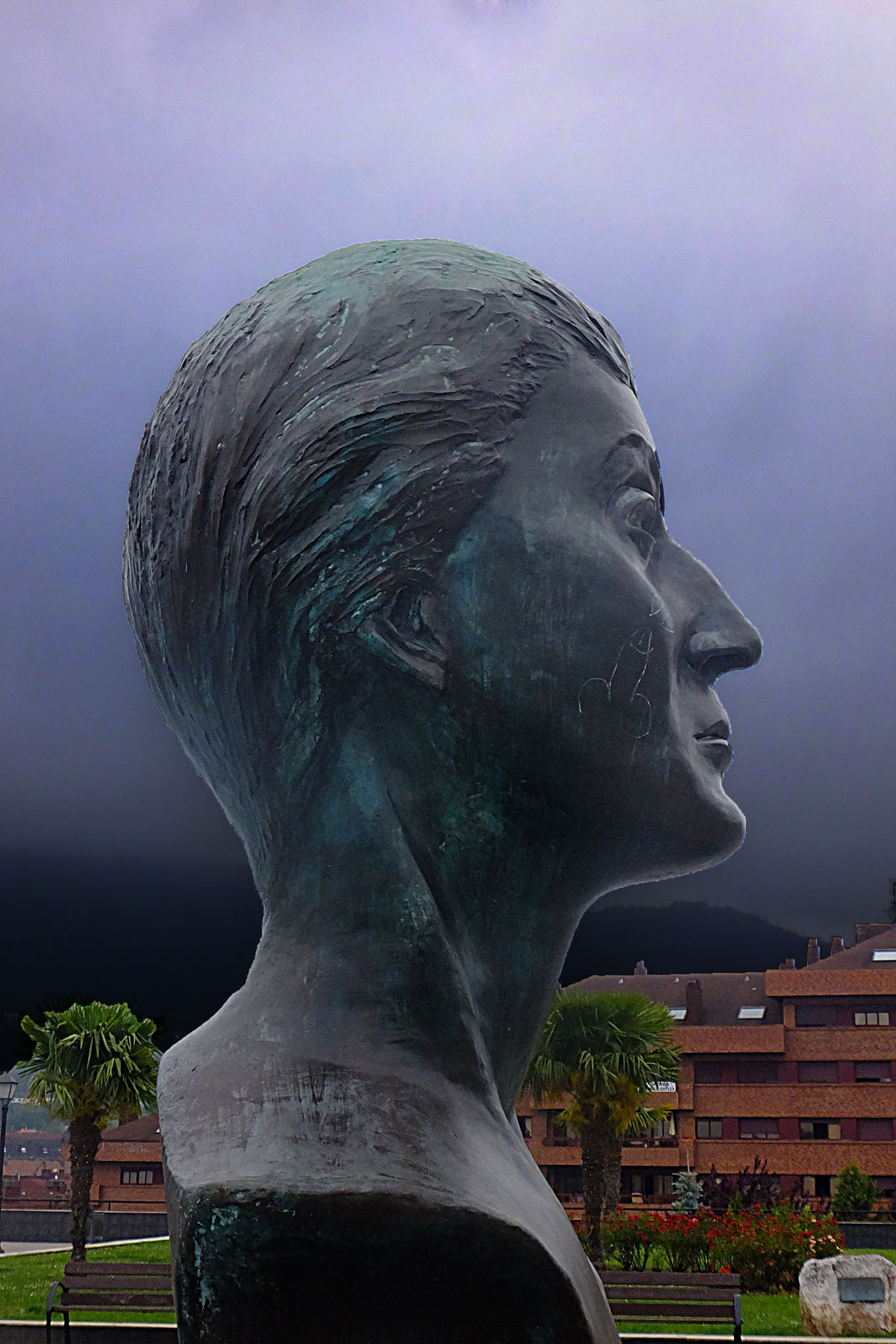
- Born: María Dolores Medio Estrada; 16 December 1911; Oviedo, Spain
- Died: 16 December 1996 (aged 85); Oviedo, Spain
- Other name: Amaranta
- Occupation: Writer
- Awards: Premio Nadal (1952)

María Dolores Medio Estrada (16 December 1911 – 16 December 1996) was a Spanish writer, the winner of the Premio Nadal in 1952 for her work Nosotros, los Rivero. She is often included in the literary Generation of '36.

== Biography ==
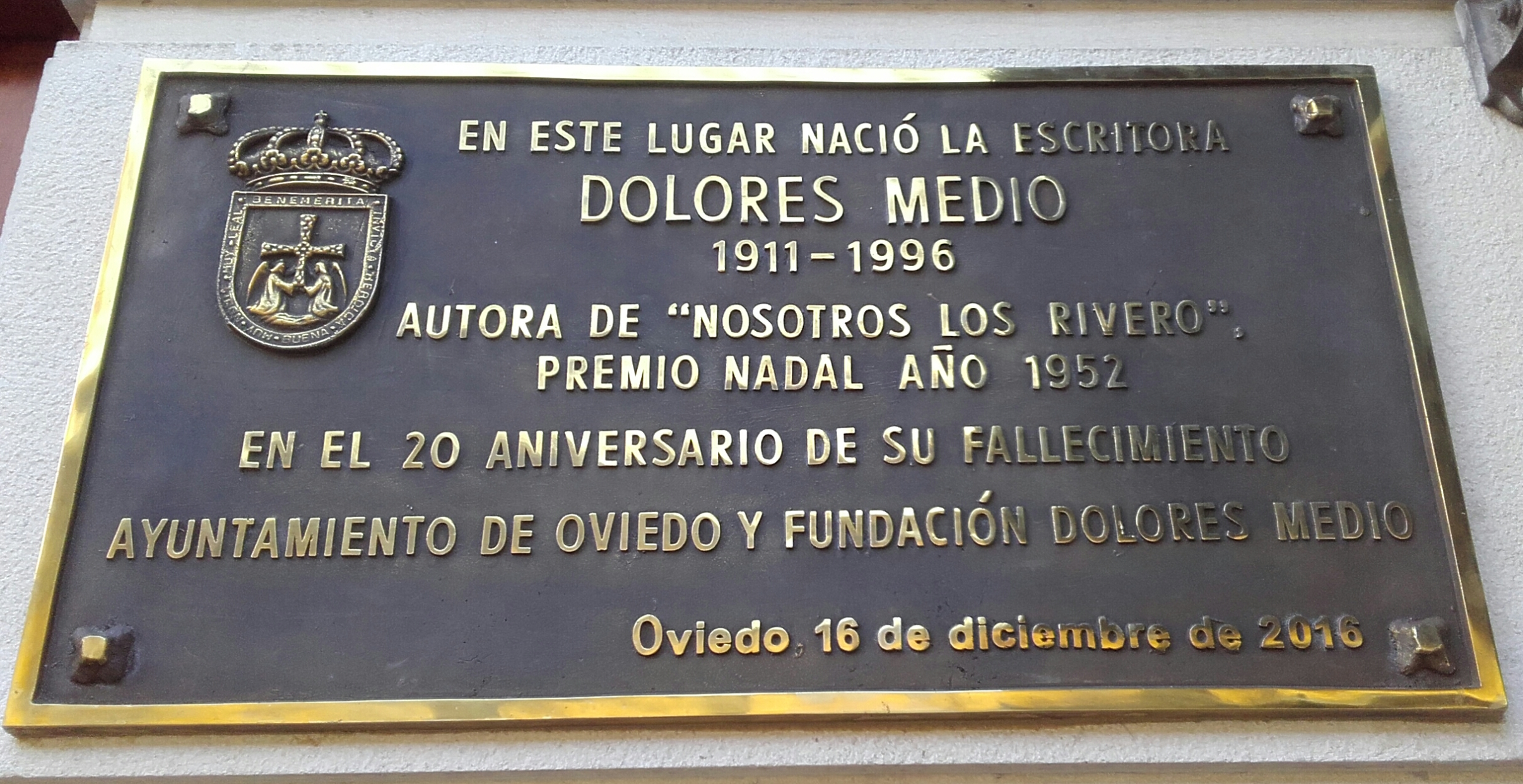
Commemorative plaque

Dolores Medio studied teaching, practicing as a teacher in Nava, Asturias. In 1945 she won the Concha Espina Prize in a contest organized by the national weekly Domingo con Nina, which was not published until 1988. She moved to Madrid where she contributed to the magazine under the pseudonym Amaranta, and there she enrolled in the School of Journalism. She began to practice without leaving teaching altogether, until in 1952 she won the Premio Nadal with Nosotros, los Rivero. The success obtained allowed her to leave school and dedicate herself entirely to literature. She connected with what she called "the true Madrid bohemian," becoming a successful author.

In 1963 she began her trilogy Los que vamos a pie with Bibiana, in which the events are recounted (autobiographical, as is much of her work) related to the demonstration in support of the miners which took her to prison, an experience in turn reported in Celda común. She won the Premio Sésamo with Andrés.

La otra circunstancia continued the trilogy in 1972. In 1982 she published El urogallo, a story written between 1936 and 1939 that was not published earlier because of problems with censorship.

Other novels by Dolores Medio include Funcionario público (1956), El pez sigue flotando (1959), Diario de una maestra (1961), Farsa de verano (1974), and El fabuloso imperio de Juan sin Tierra (1981).

She is one of the leading representatives of social literature in Spain, as well as realistic social aesthetics, being highly acclaimed during the 1950s and well into the 1960s, at which time social literature lost prominence.

In 1981 she created the Dolores Medio Foundation, to which she would donate all her patrimony and which grants the "Asturias" Novel Prize. In 1988 she returned to her hometown, Oviedo, which had named her "Favorite Daughter" and was awarded the Asturias Silver Medal. In 1992, an important group of Women's Associations of Asturias offered her a tribute in Gijón, where the Councilorship of Women had held a conference and exhibition on her life and work, in which she participated actively and hopefully.

In 2003 the Oviedo City Council decided to commission a sculpture in her memory, called Dolores Medio. The bronze work by sculptor Javier Morrás stands in the square that bears her name, Plaza de Dolores Medio, in the neighborhood La Argañosa.

On 16 December 2016, 20 years after her death, the City of Oviedo paid homage to its writer by placing a plaque in the house where she was born, on Ramón y Cajal street, her life being described by Carmen Ruiz-Tilve, chronicler of the city who had written several works about Dolores Medio.

On 4 December 2017 Ángeles Caso presented a new edition of Nosotros, los Rivero at the Libros de la Letra Azul publishing house. This edition restores the original text of the General Archive of the Administration of Alcalá de Henares, where the documentation of censorship in Francoist Spain is kept. It includes a prologue written by Caso in which the story of the work and the documents discovered in the General Archive are narrated, such as the censor's letters rejecting the novel and the author defending its publication and agreeing to remove what the censors demanded. This edition was illustrated by the artist Rebeca Menéndez.

== Works ==
- Nina (1946)
- El milagro de la noche de Reyes (1948)
- Nosotros, los Rivero (1953)
- Compás de espera (1954)
- Mañana (1954)
- Funcionario público (1956)
- El pez sigue flotando (1959)
- Diario de una maestra (1961)
- Bibiana (1963)
- El señor García (1966)
- Biografía de Isabel II de España (1966)
- Andrés (1967)
- Guía de Asturias (1968)
- Selma Lagerlöf (1971)
- La otra circunstancia (1972)
- Farsa de verano (1973)
- El bachancho (1974)
- El fabuloso imperio de Juan sin Tierra (1977)
- Atrapados en la ratonera: Memorias de una novelista (1980)
- El urogallo (1982)
- La última Xana: narraciones asturianas (1986)
- Oviedo en mi recuerdo (1990)
- En el viejo desván (Memorias) (1991)
- ¿Podrá la ciencia resucitar al hombre? (1991)
- Celda común (1996)
