= El árbol de oro =

El árbol de oro (English: The Tree of Gold) is a short story (roughly three pages) by Ana María Matute (1925-2014), written in Spanish. It is part of her collection of short stories, set in the Spanish countryside, called Historias de la Artámila (1961).

== Plot ==
The main character is a young student who is trapped at her grandfather's house one autumn because her bad health prohibits her from returning home to the city. Eventually, her grandfather consents to let her attend a local school in his small town. There, the narrator befriends a bright-eyed boy named Ivo Márquez who is described as being able to cast a "net of silver" upon those whom he encounters. Many of the children envy Ivo as he is charismatic, charming, and able to influence Señorita Leocadia, the students' teacher.

Ivo has been assigned the coveted task of going to get the students' textbooks from the small tower where they are kept. Mateo Heredia, the class's best student, asks if he can be given the key, but Ivo discourages Miss Leocadia from doing so. Ivo later tells the narrator that he desires total possession of the key because of a golden tree visible from a crack in a wall inside the tower. He believes that he alone has the right to see this mysterious tree, describing it as made completely of blinding, illuminated gold. He dramatically describes how birds turn gold when they land on the tree. He wonders if everything that touches the tree turns into gold.

One day, Ivo has fallen ill and does not come to class, allowing Mateo to receive the key. When the narrator asks the unfriendly Mateo if he is able to see the golden tree, he scoffs at her. Later, the narrator pays Mateo to borrow the key during recess. In the tower, when she looks through the crack she sees only the normal, barren countryside.

Time goes on and the narrator moves back to the city, where she came from. She returns to the same small town two summers later, and she walks past a cemetery. She sees a tree in the cemetery that is illuminated by a dying sunset, causing it to appear to be made of shimmering gold. She enters the cemetery and finds Ivo's grave at the base of the tree. He died at the age of ten, presumably from his aforementioned illness. Upon discovering Ivo's grave and the tree of gold, the narrator is not depressed but somewhat joyful of the scene.
