= Las ataduras =

Las ataduras (1960) is a short story by Carmen Martin Gaite (1925–2000) that focuses on the life of Alina, an intelligent girl who shares a strong bond with her father, Benjamin, and her maternal grandfather. The story takes place mainly in Ourense, Spain. Alina's father gives her the freedom to explore her surroundings and encourages her to do well in school so that she may become a teacher like him. Alina is his whole world and he scoffs at the stories that his father-in-law tells her which encourage travel and marriage.

"Ataduras" means bonds. Alina's grandfather tells her that "the true bonds are those that one chooses" and "one is never free; if you’re not tied to someone, you’re not alive." He tells her that a woman both protects and ties a man down. As Alina matures, and especially after the passing of her grandfather, she sees her friends become adults: Eloy moves to Buenos Aires and others marry and have children. Alina grows restless and yearns to leave the village; she admits to Don Felix that she has lost faith. Later, Alina starts to have a sexual relationship with a French man named Philippe which results in her falling in love with Phillippe, becoming pregnant, marrying Philippe, and moves to Paris with him where they have two sons, abandoning her dreams of majoring in art in Santiago de Compostela. Alina's husband is loving, but does not understand the power of Alina's traditional family ties, having left his own family when he was young.

"Las ataduras" begins with Benjamin unable to sleep. He and his wife, Herminia, have just returned from visiting their daughter and son-in-law for the first time in three years. They quarrel after Benjamin starts to lament the fate of their daughter. In Paris, Alina is also unable to sleep and she argues with Philippe about her behavior and her parents’ awkward visit.

Throughout the story, Benjamin refers to his father-in-law as crazy when he cries from his great fear of death and solitude. By the end, it is Benjamin who is afraid to die alone before Herminia who jokes that they should hurry up and finish the chick house. Herminia reassures her brother with "whatever God wants" and "just be quiet" and they walk home together.

"Las ataduras" encompasses many themes, most notably: bonds, love, tradition, and the true meaning of freedom.
