= Los niños tontos =

1956 short story collection by Ana María Matute

- First edition
- Author: Ana María Matute
- Language: Spanish
- Genre: Short story collection
- Publisher: Ediciones Arión
- Publication date: 1956
- Publication place: Spain
- Media type: Print
- Pages: 59

Los niños tontos (The Foolish Children) is a collection of twenty-one stories written by Ana María Matute, first published in Madrid in 1956 by Ediciones Arión.

The protagonists of the stories are children, hence the title, however it is not children's literature: themes such as death and cruelty appear in all of the stories. The adjective tontos ("foolish") refers to the children's condition of being marginalized or excluded both from the adult world and from the world of children, for reasons including physical deformity, illness, and social class differences.

== Stories ==
- La niña fea ("The Ugly Girl")
- El niño que era amigo del demonio ("The Boy Who Was the Devil's Friend")
- Polvo de carbón ("Coal Dust")
- El negrito de los ojos azules ("The Black Boy with Blue Eyes")
- El año que no llegó ("The Year that Did Not Arrive")
- El incendio ("The Fire")
- El hijo de la lavandera ("The Washerwoman's Son")
- El árbol ("The Tree")
- El niño que encontró un violín en un granero ("The Boy Who Found a Violin in a Barn")
- El escaparate de la pastelería ("The Cake Shop Window")
- El otro niño ("The Other Boy")
- La niña que no estaba en ninguna parte ("The Girl Who Was Nowhere")
- El tiovivo ("The Carousel")
- El niño que no sabía jugar ("The Boy Who Didn't Know How to Play")
- El corderito pascual ("The Easter Lamb")
- El niño del cazador ("The Hunter's Boy")
- La sed y el niño ("The Thirst and The Boy")
- El niño al que se le murió el amigo ("The Boy Whose Friend Died")
- El jorobado ("The Hunchback")
- El niño de los hornos ("The Child of the Ovens")
- Mar ("Sea")

== Themes and Characteristics ==
Although each story has a distinct plot, their common thread lies in the way they reflect the dark and cruel reality surrounding the child protagonists. The dominant theme is death, which appears in twelve of the stories. The other nine have equally tragic endings in which unhappiness prevails.

The following themes stand out in the stories:

- Childhood cruelty. Appears in "El hijo de la lavandera" ("The Washerwoman's Son") and "La niña fea" ("The Ugly Girl"), where the children are the targets of insults, violence and discrimination on part of their peers. In "El niño que no sabía jugar" ("The Boy Who Didn't Know How to Play") it is the protagonist who dispenses violence, tearing the heads off various animals.
- The loss of innocence. "El niño al que se le murió el amigo" ("The Boy Whose Friend Died") and "La niña que no estaba en ninguna parte" ("The Girl Who Was Nowhere") are the only stories in which the children attain adulthood. In the first, the toys that symbolize childhood end up being thrown into a well, and in the second they are piled in a closet. In these two stories, the children chart their own course into adulthood. In contrast, in "El corderito pascual" ("The Easter Lamb") it is the adult world which collides with childhood innocence when the father cooks his son's best friend, a lamb.
- Incomprehension. Present in "El escaparate de la pastelería" ("The Cake Shop Window") and "El jorobado" ("The Hunchback"). In the first, adults fail to understand that the necessities of the boy go beyond having food to eat, and he prefers to die rather than live without familial love and caring. In "El jorobado", the incomprehension is on the part of the father, who keeps his son hidden due to his physical deformity rather than allow him to socialize with other people.
- Imagination. Appears in "El árbol" ("The Tree"), "Polvo de carbón" ("Coal Dust"), and "Mar" ("Sea"), in which children's imagination comes into conflict with reality, even causing their death. In "Polvo de carbón" and "Mar", a girl and a boy try to pursue their fantasies (a coal-seller girl who tries to wash herself with the moon, and a boy who searches for the sound of the sea, respectively) which causes them both to end up drowning.
- Goodness. In "El niño que era amigo del demonio" ("The Boy Who Was the Devil's Friend"), the protagonist accepts the friendship of the devil because he feels pity for it, although the more selfish motive he expresses at the end is the possibility of ascending to Heaven rather than being trapped in Hell after death.

== Symbols ==
In this collection, the presence of symbols is very pronounced. It is a symbolism that revolves around death. Night and darkness mark the tragic moment in the majority of the stories. In "Polvo de carbón" ("Coal Dust") and "El niño del cazador" ("The Hunter's Boy"), the moon plays an important role in the death of the protagonists: in the first, it functions as a magnet for disaster, while in the second it is part of the cold night sky. Water symbolizes purification and cleanness of the soul, although in "Polvo de carbón" and "Mar" ("Sea") it is the reason for the death of the children. In "El hijo de la lavandera" ("The Washerwoman's Son"), the purifying nature of water appears, despite being cut short by the reception that it receives. Contrasting this is the fire that represents sacrifice in "El niño de los hornos" ("The Child of the Ovens") where jealousy drives the boy to burn his younger brother. In "El incendio" ("The Fire"), the boy starts a fire that ends up taking his life.

The plant and animal worlds are present in all of the stories, with different meanings. Flora has a positive significance in "La niña fea" ("The Ugly Girl"), "El árbol" ("The Tree") and "El negrito de los ojos azules" ("The Black Boy with Blue Eyes"), where nature shelters the children from the world that surrounds them. Some animals, such as birds, insects, reptiles, and cats, have a negative connotation, whereas others, such as a dog and a lamb, are the children's friends.

The parents in the stories have contrasting aspects. On the one hand, there are maternal figures who take care of their children but are incapable of helping or protecting them, as in "El árbol" ("The Tree") or in "Mar" ("Sea"), where the mother cannot prevent the death of her child. On the other hand, there are absent or disinterested parental figures who fail to understand their children, as in "El corderito pascual" ("The Easter Lamb").

Finally, colors such as yellow, red, green, blue, and black represent suffering, solitude, exclusion, and death.

== Style ==
Ana María Matute makes use of a lyric prose style with a magical quality, in order to achieve greater depth in the representation of life. Through a heterodiegetic and omniscient narrator, the author is able to describe the events in an objective manner. Endings that are open or ambiguous, and the use of ellipsis, allow readers to form their own interpretations of the stories.

There are no concrete indications of the historical period in which the stories are set, however Petra Báder considers the absence of parental figures in the stories to be a consequence of the Spanish Civil War.
