= Carmen Martín Gaite =

Spanish writer (1925–2000)

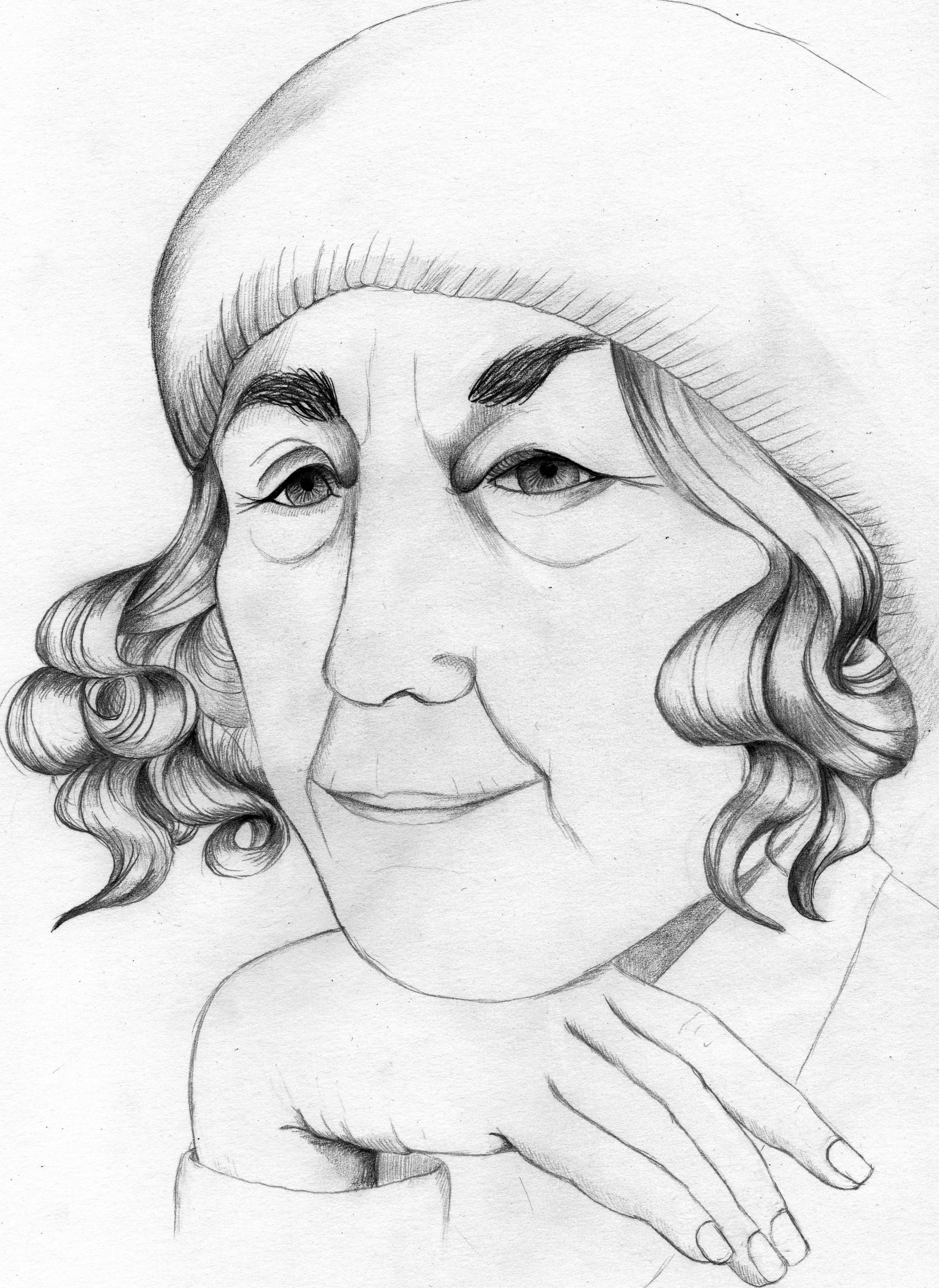
- Born: 8 December 1925; Salamanca, Spain
- Died: 23 July 2000 (aged 74); Madrid, Spain
- Occupations: Novelist; short-story writer; essayist; translator
- Spouse: Rafael Sánchez Ferlosio
- Writing career
- Language: Spanish
- Years active: 1954-2000
- Notable works: Entre visillos (1957); Las ataduras (1960)

Carmen Martín Gaite (8 December 1925 – 23 July 2000) was a Spanish author who wrote many novels, short stories, screenplays, and essays across multiple genres. Her work has received significant recognition: in 1957, she was awarded the Premio Nadal for Entre visillos; in 1988 she won the Prince of Asturias Award;in 1992 she received the Premio Castilla y León de las Letras, and she also was awarded the Premio Acebo de Honor for her life's work.

== Biography ==
Carmen Martín Gaite was born on 8 December 1925 in Salamanca. She was the second daughter of José Martín López (Valladolid, 1885) and María Gaite Veloso (Orense, 1894), who married in 1923. Her parents met in Salamanca, where her father worked as a notary. Her mother and maternal grandparents were from Orense. Her grandfather was a professor of geography, and her great-uncle founded the Ateneo of Orense and was a director and publisher of a newspaper called El Orensano. The family spent their summers on her grandparents' farm in San Lorenzo de Piñor (Barbadás), five kilometers away from Orense. These trips, which formed the basis of her connection with Galicia and its culture, later influenced some of her written work, including Las ataduras and Retahílas.

Martín Gaite grew up in the city of Salamanca. Her father had liberal political leanings and did not want her to be educated in a religious institute. Thus, instead of attending a religiously affiliated school in her early years, Martín Gaite was taught at home by private tutors and her father, who was fascinated by history and literature.

The start of the Spanish Civil War prevented Martín Gaite from attending the last two years of High School at the School Institute of Madrid, as her sister Ana had done before her. She completed her secondary education at the Women's School Institute of Salamanca, a setting that was later represented in her novel Entre visillos. There, she was taught by Rafael Lapesa and Salvador Fernández Ramírez, future members of the Real Academia Española (Royal Spanish Academy). Their influence would leave a significant mark on her literary vocation.

In 1943, she studied philosophy at the University of Salamanca, where she was taught by Francisco Maldonado, Antonio Tovar, Manuel García Calvo, and Alonso Zamora Vicente. In her first year, she met Ignacio Aldecoa and Agustín García Calvo. Around this time, her first poems were published in the magazine Trabajos y días. She also became interested in the theatre, taking part in several plays as an actress. During the summer of 1946, she was awarded a grant by the University of Coimbra, where she deepened her interest in Portuguese-Galician culture.

After finishing her degree in Romance Languages in the summer of 1948, she was awarded a scholarship for further studies abroad at the Collège International de Cannes. There, she perfected her French and became familiar with a more open and cosmopolitan society. That same year, she moved to Madrid in order to prepare her Ph.D. thesis on XIII Galician-Portuguese chansonnier, which she did not complete. In Madrid, Ignacio Aldecoa introduced her to a literary circle that included some of the writers who were part of the Generation of '50. Significant members of this circle were Medardo Fraile, Alfonso Sastre, Mayrata O'Wisiedo, Jesús Fernández Santos, Rafael Sánchez Ferlosio, Josefina Aldecoa, and Carlos Edmundo de Ory.

Gaite was married to fellow writer Rafael Sánchez Ferlosio.

== Bibliography ==
=== Novels ===
- Entre visillos (1957) (Premio Nadal)
- Ritmo lento (1963)
- Retahílas (1974)
- Fragmentos de interior (1976)
- El cuarto de atrás (1978)
- Nubosidad variable (1992)
- Variable Cloud (1996) (Translation of Nubosidad variable, (1992)
- La Reina de las Nieves (1994)
- Lo raro es vivir (1996)
- Irse de casa (1998)
- The Back Room (2000) (Translation of El cuarto de atrás, (1978)
- Los parentescos (2001) (posthumous, unfinished)
- Usos amorosos de la posguerra española

=== Short stories ===
- El balneario (1954)
- Las ataduras (1960)
- Cuentos completos (1978)

=== Children's literature ===
- El castillo de las tres murallas (1981)
- El pastel del diablo (1985)
- Caperucita en Manhattan (1990)

=== Theatre ===
- A palo seco (1957)
- La hermana pequeña (1959)

=== Television ===
- Teresa de Jesús (see article) (1984 miniseries)

=== Poetry ===
- A rachas (1976)

=== Essays ===
- El proceso de Macanaz (1969)
- Usos amorosos del dieciocho en España (1972)
- La búsqueda de interlocutor y otras búsquedas (1973)
- El cuento de nunca acabar (1983)
- Usos amorosos de la postguerra española (1987)
- Desde la ventana (1987)
- Agua pasada (1992)
- Cuadernos de todo (2002)

=== Translation ===
- Madame Bovary (1993)
