= Sergio Vila-Sanjuán =

Spanish journalist and novelist

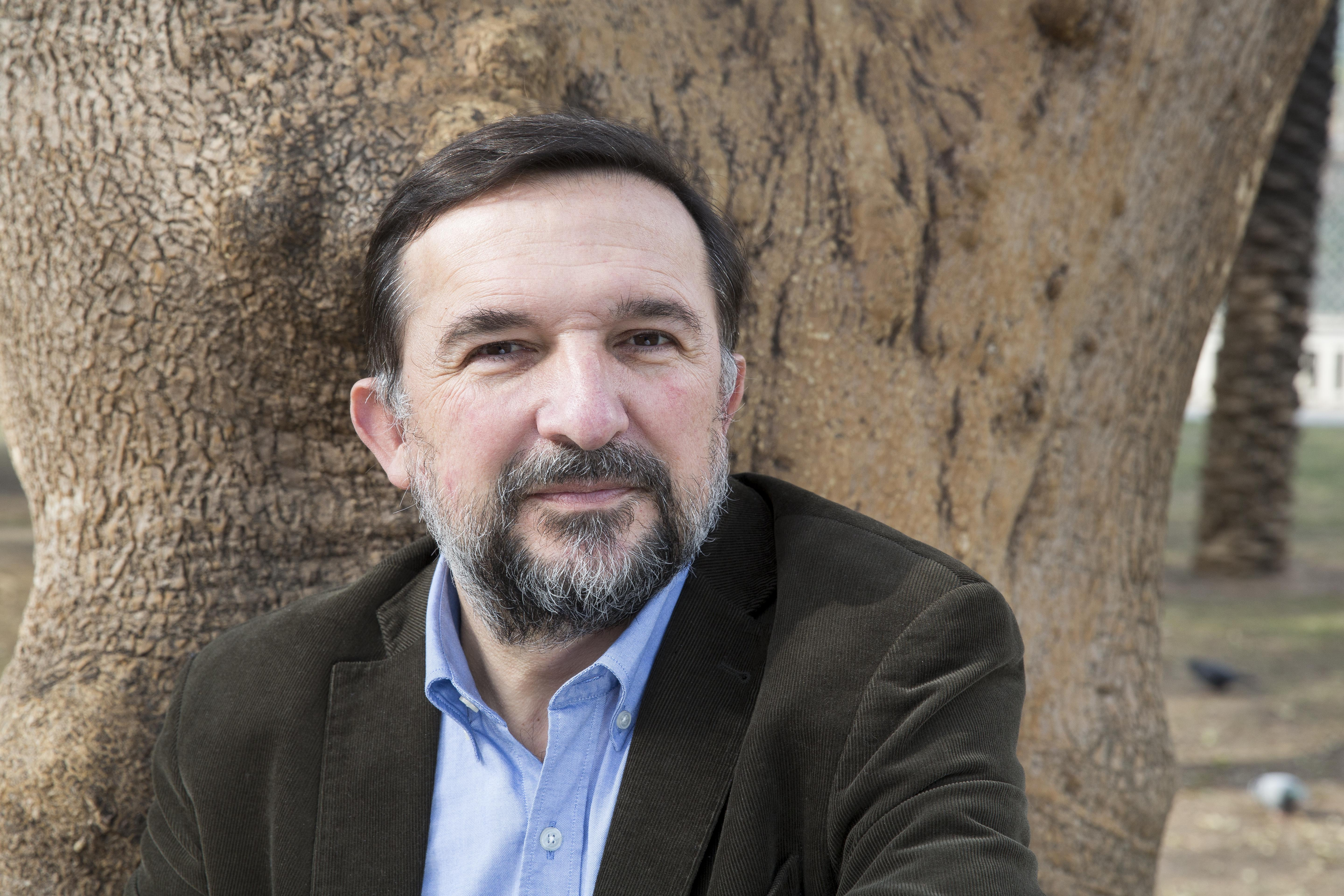
Sergio Vila-Sanjuán Robert

Sergio Vila-Sanjuán (born Barcelona, 1957) is a Spanish journalist and novelist. After obtaining a degree in history, he received a Fulbright scholarship to go and study in the United States. He has been working in the field of cultural journalism since 1977, holding senior positions at publications such as El Correo Catalán, El Noticiero Universal and La Vanguardia. He has published several books about the world of publishing, such as Pasando página. Autores y editores en la España democrática (2003), El síndrome de Frankfurt (2007) and Código best seller (2011).

He published his debut novel Una heredera de Barcelona in 2010. His second novel Estaba en el aire (2013) won the Premio Nadal. He has also written a monograph on the Spanish artist Miquel Barceló (1984), and a collection of his articles was published under the title Crónicas culturales (2004).
