= José Vidal Cadellans =

Spanish novelist (1928–1960)

José Vidal Cadellans (1928–1960) was a Spanish novelist. He published only one novel in his lifetime, titled No era de los nuestros, which won the Premio Nadal in 1958. He died in 1960 at the age of 31; two other books were published after his death.

He married Concepció Torrescasana Vila in September 1959. They had a daughter Solange Vidal Torrescasana. Although almost completely forgotten today, his distinctive works attracted critical attention when they were published. An extensive summary of his life and work was published by Revista Igualada by Oscar Jorba Jorba.
