= José Félix Tapia =

Spanish writer and journalist (1910–1969)

José Félix Tapia Ruiz (1910 in Madrid – 1969 in Madrid) was a Spanish writer and journalist. He was of Basque origin and grew up in Bilbao. He studied journalism at the University of Deusto, and went to work at the newspaper La Nacion. After the end of the Spanish Civil War, he started to work at another publication El Alcázar. From 1964, he worked at Agencia EFE.

As a novelist, his key work is the title La luna ha entrado en casa, which won the Premio Nadal in 1945.
