= Gabriel García-Badell =

Spanish writer

- Born: Gabriel García-Badell Lapetra; 28 May 1936; Madrid, Spain
- Died: 11 March 1994 (aged 57); Canfranc, Huesca, Spain
- Occupations: Writer, lawyer
- Writing career
- Language: Aragonese
- Years active: 1968–1994
- Genre: Novel
- Notable work: Amaro dice que Dios existe y dos novelas más (1979)

Gabriel García-Badell Lapetra (28 May 1936 – 11 March 1994) was a Spanish writer. He received a degree in law and is linked to Aragon, where he worked as a lawyer for the IRYDA (Institute of agricultural reform and development).

His first novel was "Las manos de mi padre", published in 1968, a monologue in which the protagonist returns to his paternal home after a 4 years voyage.

García-Badell was a four-time runner-up for the Premio Nadal, a record. He won the Ramón J. Sender Journalism Award and the Ciudad de Barbastro Novel Award.
