= Francisco José Alcántara =

Spanish writer and journalist

Francisco José Alcántara (1922–1999) was a Spanish writer and journalist. He was born in Haro and grew up in Bilbao and La Coruna. He worked as a Jesuit missionary in Bogotá and Caracas, and afterwards returning to civilian life, studied in Zaragoza and Barcelona. He is best known for his novel La muerte le sienta bien a Villalobos which won the Premio Nadal in 1954.
