= Entre visillos =

Entre visillos (English: Behind the Curtains) is the first novel of the late Spanish writer Carmen Martín Gaite, who was from Salamanca. Published in 1957, it is considered one of the author's most important works, and won her the Premio Nadal in 1957. In a list published by the Spanish newspaper El Mundo, it was considered one of the best 100 Spanish novels of the 20th century.

== Plot ==
Through seemingly trivial conversations among a group of young women, the tedium and emptiness of their lives is revealed. The plot centers on the arrival of Pablo Klein to the city to teach German at the high school. The women are not the only ones to notice that his personality conflicts with the flat and conformist atmosphere that encloses the lives of the young women.
