= Olvidado rey Gudú =

1996 novel by Ana María Matute

- Author: Ana María Matute
- Language: Spanish
- Genre: fantasy
- Publisher: Espasa-Calpe
- Publication date: 1996
- Publication place: Spain
- Pages: 865
- ISBN: 9788423976652

Olvidado rey Gudú (lit. 'Forgotten King Gudú') is a 1996 fantasy novel by the Spanish writer Ana María Matute. It takes place over five generations and tells the story of the Kingdom of Olar from its birth to its end. The setting combines 10th-century Central Europe with magical and fantastical elements.

Matute considered Olvidado rey Gudú her best work but developed the belief that once it was published, she would die. She kept the manuscript for 20 years before submitting it to a publisher. At the time of publication, she said in an interview: "I'm over seventy years old and I have to die one day, and I prefer that, if this is a success, I enjoy it in life and not posthumously". The book was a major critical success in Spain. Matute continued to live for 18 years after it came out.
