= Leap in the Dark =

British TV anthology series (1973–1980)

Leap in the Dark is a British television anthology series with a supernatural theme. It was broadcast on BBC 2. It ran for four series - in 1973, 1975, 1977 and 1980 - consisting of twenty-four episodes in total. The first-series episodes were documentaries, series two & three were presented by Colin Wilson and consisted of docudramas re-enacting real-life cases of paranormal occurrences, and series four was original dramas, including episodes written by Alan Garner, Fay Weldon, and David Rudkin. Apart from the pilot episode, no episode of the first series exists complete due to wiping, and the episode The Battle for Miss Beauchamp, (pronounced 'Bee-cham'), in the second series, is also incomplete.

== Episodes ==
=== Series 1 ===
1. Pilot (9 January 1973)
2. Untitled (6 February 1973) - missing
3. A Question of Survival (13 February 1973) - missing
4. Pendulums and Hazel Twigs (20 February 1973) - missing
5. Mind Over Matter (27 February 1973) - missing
6. Hauntings (6 February 1973) - missing
7. Untitled (20 March 1973) - missing

=== Series 2 ===
1. The Rosenheim Poltergeist (19 September 1975)
2. The Search for Pat MacAdam (26 September 1975)
3. The Battle for Miss Beauchamp (3 October 1975) - incomplete
4. The Vandy Case (10 October 1975) Written by Anne Owen

=== Series 3 ===
1. Dream Me a Winner (14 January 1977) Written by Colin Godman
2. The Fetch (21 January 1977) Written by Anne Owen, about the story of Émilie Sagée
3. The Ghost of Ardachie Lodge (28 January 1977) Written by Colin Godman
4. Undercurrents (4 February 1977)
5. Parlour Games (11 February 1977) Written by Anne Owen
6. In the Mind's Eye (18 February 1977)

=== Series 4 ===
1. Jack Be Nimble (4 September 1980) Written by Peter Redgrove
2. Watching Me, Watching You (5 September 1980) Written by Fay Weldon
3. Poor Jenny (8 September 1980) Written by Colin Godman
4. The Living Grave (9 September 1980) Written by David Rudkin
5. Come and Find Me (10 September 1980) Written by Russell Hoban
6. Room for an Inward Light (11 September 1980) Written by David Pownall
7. To Kill a King (12 September 1980) Written by Alan Garner
