= Carmen Amoraga =

Spanish writer

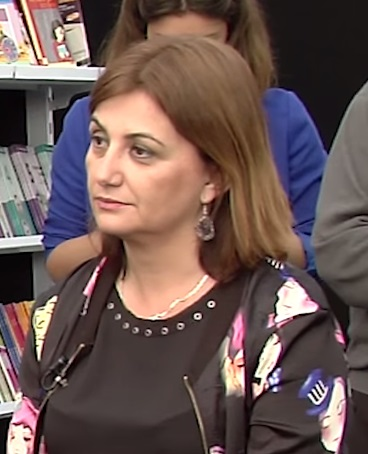
Carmen Amoraga, 2015.

María Carmen Amoraga Toledo (born 1969) is a Spanish writer. She was born in Picanya, Valencia, and studied information science at university. Her debut novel Para que nada se pierda won the Ateneo Joven award in 1997. Other notable works include La larga noche, Algo tan parecido al amor and El tiempo mientras tanto. Her most recent novel La vida era eso won the 2014 Premio Nadal.

She has also written a book about childbirth and maternity. She contributes to a variety of print and broadcast media.
