= Fiesta al noroeste =

1952 novel by Ana María Matute

First edition (publ. Afrodisio Aguado)

Fiesta al noroeste is a novel written by Spanish author Ana María Matute and first published in 1952.

== Summary ==
Dingo is a puppeteer who is travelling when he runs over a small child with his cart. He then goes to Artámila in order to find Juan Medinao, a prominent land-owner and childhood companion, and find the child's family. Juan is really rich, and when Dingo arrives a servant comes to get Juan. Then, there is a flashback of the childhood of Juan, when his father, aka Juan Padre, was abusive to him and had an affair with Salomé, a woman in the town. Salomé had Juan Padre's second child, Pablo Zacaro. Juan's mother died as a result of Juan Padre's actions towards her, and after her death, Juan Padre sent Juan away to boarding school because Juan reminds him of his mother. However, Juan wants to know his brother, so he returns home to Artámila. Then, the story returns to the present, where a priest and doctor have joined Juan and Dingo at the dead child's house. The doctor is always drunk (emborrachado). Then, Juan confesses to the priest that his whole life he has been prideful. The rest of the book is his confession (as a flashback).

Although Juan was an awkward child with a large head, he and Dingo were friends. They became friends when they realized that both of their dads beat them. Pablo, on the other hand, was a stone-fox. Juan Padre was really rich, and when he died, he gave all his money and land to Juan. At one point, Dingo brings Juan to a puppet show in the town, and it scares Juan, but Dingo runs away with the puppet cart.

Pablo feels every man should construct his own house, but Juan owns all the land and refuses to let Pablo build there. The servants unite around Pablo against Juan, and Pablo runs away. After Pablo runs away, Juan realizes that he wants everyone to know that they are brothers, so he asks Salome where Pablo went. Unfortunately, Salomé doesn't know, but Pablo returns to the town with a girlfriend Delia, a peasant woman. Juan goes to Delia's family and asks for her hand in marriage, but she doesn't want to marry him. However, her family forces her to marry Juan so that she won't have to work anymore. After this, Pablo hates Juan and never wants to be with him. He also rejects Delia.

The flashback ends here and Juan's confession is over. The last chapter of the book is the dead child's funeral.

== Themes ==
The main theme is pride. Juan's pride prohibited his happiness. At the end of the novel, Juan Medinao wanted to be with his brother, but because he told Pablo that he couldn't build a house on his land, their relationship is ruined. Pride also affected Pablo because he was too prideful to accept Delia after her marriage to Juan.
