= Premio Nadal =

Spanish literature awards

Premio Nadal (Spanish: [ˈpɾemjo naˈðal]) is a Spanish literary prize awarded annually by the publishing house Ediciones Destino, part of Planeta. It has been awarded every year on 6 January since 1944. The Josep Pla Award for Catalan literature is given at the same ceremony.

The current monetary award stand at €18,000 for the winner; since 2010 the award does not choose or recognize a runner-up. It is one of the oldest and most prestigious Spanish literary awards.

== Winners ==
List of Premio Nadal winners since the award was established:

- 1944: Carmen Laforet for Nada
- 1945: José Félix Tapia for La Luna ha entrado en casa
- 1946: José María Gironella for Un hombre
- 1947: Miguel Delibes for La sombra del ciprés es alargada
- 1948: Sebastián Juan Arbó for Sobre las piedras grises
- 1949: José Suárez Carreño for Las últimas horas
- 1950: Elena Quiroga for Viento del Norte
- 1951: Luis Romero for La noria
- 1952: Dolores Medio for Nosotros, los Rivero
- 1953: Lluïsa Forrellad for Siempre en capilla
- 1954: Francisco José Alcántara for La muerte le sienta bien a Villalobos
- 1955: Rafael Sánchez Ferlosio for El Jarama
- 1956: José Luis Martín Descalzo for La frontera de Dios
- 1957: Carmen Martín Gaite for Entre visillos
- 1958: José Vidal Cadellans for No era de los nuestros
- 1959: Ana María Matute for Primera memoria
- 1960: Ramiro Pinilla for Ciegas hormigas
- 1961: Juan Antonio Payno for El curso
- 1962: José María Mendiola for Muerte por fusilamiento
- 1963: Manuel Mejía Vallejo for El día señalado
- 1964: Alfonso Martínez Garrido for El miedo y la esperanza
- 1965: Eduardo Caballero Calderón for El buen salvaje
- 1966: Vicente Soto for La zancada
- 1967: José María Sanjuán for Réquiem por todos nosotros
- 1968: Álvaro Cunqueiro for Un hombre que se parecía a Orestes
- 1969: Francisco García Pavón for Las hermanas coloradas
- 1970: Jesús Fernández Santos for Libro de las memorias de las cosas
- 1971: José María Requena for El cuajarón
- 1972: José María Carrascal for Groovy
- 1973: José Antonio García Blázquez for El rito
- 1974: Luis Gasulla for Culminación de Montoya
- 1975: Francisco Umbral for Las ninfas
- 1976: Raúl Guerra Garrido for Lectura insólita de "El Capital"
- 1977: José Asenjo Sedano for Conversación sobre la guerra
- 1978: Germán Sánchez Espeso for Narciso
- 1979: Carlos Rojas for El ingenioso hidalgo y poeta Federico García Lorca asciende a los infiernos
- 1980: Juan Ramón Zaragoza for Concerto grosso
- 1981: Carmen Gómez Ojea for Cantiga de agüero
- 1982: Fernando Arrabal for La torre herida por el rayo
- 1983: Salvador García Aguilar for Regocijo en el hombre
- 1984: José Luis de Tomás for La otra orilla de la droga
- 1985: Pau Faner Coll for Flor de sal
- 1986: Manuel Vicent for Balada de Caín
- 1987: Juan José Saer for La ocasión
- 1988: Juan Pedro Aparicio for Retratos de ambigú
- 1989: Not awarded
- 1990: Juan José Millás for La soledad era esto
- 1991: Alfredo Conde for Los otros días
- 1992: Alejandro Gándara for Ciegas esperanzas
- 1993: Rafael Argullol for La razón del mal
- 1994: Rosa Regàs for Azul
- 1995: Ignacio Carrión for Cruzar el Danubio
- 1996: Pedro Maestre Herrero for Matando dinosaurios con tirachinas
- 1997: Carlos Cañeque for Quién
- 1998: Lucía Etxebarria for Beatriz y los cuerpos celestes
- 1999: Gustavo Martín Garzo for Las historias de Marta y Fernando
- 2000: Lorenzo Silva for El alquimista impaciente
- 2001: Fernando Marías Amondo for El niño de los coroneles
- 2002: Ángela Vallvey for Los estados carenciales
- 2003: Andrés Trapiello for Los amigos del crimen perfecto
- 2004: Antonio Soler for El camino de los ingleses
- 2005: Pedro Zarraluki for Un encargo difícil
- 2006: Eduardo Lago for Llámame Brooklyn
- 2007: Felipe Benítez Reyes for Mercado de espejismos
- 2008: Francisco Casavella for Lo que sé de los vampiros
- 2009: Maruja Torres for Esperadme en el cielo
- 2010: Clara Sanchez for Lo que esconde tu nombre
- 2011: Alicia Giménez Bartlett for Donde nadie te encuentre
- 2012: Álvaro Pombo for El temblor del héroe
- 2013: Sergio Vila-Sanjuán for Estaba en el aire
- 2014: Carmen Amoraga for La vida era eso
- 2015: José C. Vales for Cabaret Biarritz
- 2016: Víctor del Árbol for La víspera de casi todo
- 2017: Care Santos for Media vida
- 2018: Alejandro Palomas for Un amor
- 2019: Guillermo Martínez for Los crímenes de Alicia
- 2020: Ana Merino for El mapa de los afectos
- 2021: Najat El Hachmi for El lunes nos querrán
- 2022: Inés Martín Rodrigo for Las formas del querer
- 2023: Manuel Vilas for Nosotros
- 2024: César Pérez Gellida for Bajo tierra seca
- 2025: Jorge Fernández Díaz for El secreto de Marcial
- 2026: David Uclés for La ciudad de las luces muertas

== Runners-up ==
List of runners-up (finalistas) of Premio Nadal since the award was instituted:

- 1944: José María Álvarez Blázquez for En el pueblo hay caras nuevas
- 1945: Francisco García Pavón for Cerca de Oviedo
- 1946: Eulalia Galvarriato for Cinco sombras and Luis Manteiga for Un hombre à la deriva
- 1947: Ana María Matute for Los Abel, Rosa María Cajal for Juan Risco and Juan Manuel Pombo Angulo for Hospital General
- 1948: Manuel Mur Oti for Destino negro and Antonio Rodríguez Huescar for Vida con una diosa
- 1949: Carlos de Santiago for El huerto de Pisadiel
- 1950: Francisco Montero Galvache for El mar está solo
- 1951: Tomás Salvador for Historias de Valcanillo, José María Jové for Mientras llueve en la tierra and José Antonio Giménez Arnau for De pantalón largo
- 1952: Severiano Fernández Nicolás for La ciudad sin horizonte and Vicente Risco for La puerta de paja
- 1953: Alejandro Núñez Alonso for La gota de mercurio
- 1954: Ángel Oliver for Días turbulentos
- 1955: Héctor Vázquez Azpiri for Víbora
- 1956: Jesús López Pacheco for Central eléctrica
- 1957: Lauro Olmo for Ayer, 27 de octubre
- 1958: Claudio Bassols for El carnaval de los gigantes
- 1959: Armando López Salinas for La mina
- 1960: Gonzalo Torrente Malvido for Hombres varados
- 1961: Pedro Antoñana for La cuerda rota
- 1962: Manuel Barrios for El crimen
- 1963: Mariano Viguera for Coral
- 1964: Manuel Barrios for La espuela
- 1965: Juan Farias for Los buscadores de agua
- 1966: Carmelo M. Lozano for Gambito de alfil de rey
- 1967: Francisco García Pavón for El reinado de Witiza
- 1968: Eduardo García for Sede vacante
- 1969: Luis Ricardo Alonso for El candidato
- 1970: Gabriel García-Badell for De las Armas de Montemolín
- 1971: Gustavo Álvarez de Gardeazábal for Dabeiba
- 1972: Gabriel García-Badell for Las cartas cayeron boca abajo and Bernardo Víctor Carande for Suroeste
- 1973: Gabriel García-Badell for Funeral por Francia y Aquilino Duque for El mono azul
- 1974: Guillermo Ariel Ramón Carrizo for Crónica sin héroes
- 1975: Manuel Villar Raso for Mar ligeramente Sur
- 1976: Emilio Mansera Conde for La crisopa
- 1977: Gabriel García-Badell for La zarabanda
- 1978: Manuel Vicent for El anarquista coronado con adelfas and Rocío Vélez de Piedrahita for Terrateniente
- 1979: Manuel Vicent for Ángeles o neófitos and Gabriel García-Badell for Nuevo auto de fe
- 1980: Ramón Eiroa for Notas para la aclaración de un suicidio and Jorge González Aranguren for En otros parques donde estar ardiendo
- 1981: Alfonso Zapater for El accidente and Juan Luis González Ripoll for El dandy del lunar
- 1982: José Luis Aguirre for La excursión
- 1983: José Avello Flórez for La subversión de Beti García
- 1984: Telmo Herrera for Papá murió hoy
- 1985: Vicente Sánchez Pinto for Los desiertos del amor
- 1986: Horacio Vázquez-Rial for Historia del Triste and Rafael Humberto Moreno-Durán for Los felinos del Canciller
- 1987: José Ferrater Mora for El juego de la verdad
- 1988: Jesús Carazo for Los límites del paraíso
- 1989: Not awarded
- 1990: Pedro Crespo García for El cuaderno de Forster
- 1991: Mariano Arias for El silencio de las palabras
- 1992: Jesús Díaz for Las palabras perdidas
- 1993: Jorge Ordaz for La perla del Oriente
- 1994: José Ángel Mañas for Historias del Kronen
- 1995: Félix Bayón for Adosados
- 1996: Juana Salabert for Arde lo que será
- 1997: Lorenzo Silva for La flaqueza del bolchevique
- 1998: Ignacio García-Valiño for La caricia del escorpión
- 1999: Lilian Neuman for Levantar ciudades
- 2000: José Carlos Somoza for Dafne desvanecida
- 2001: Lola Beccaria for La luna en Jorge
- 2002: José Luis de Juan for Kaleidoscopio
- 2003: David Torres for El gran silencio
- 2004: Javier Puebla for Sonríe Delgado
- 2005: Nicolás Casariego for Cazadores de luz
- 2006: Marta Sanz for Susana y los viejos
- 2007: Carmen Amoraga for Algo tan parecido al amor
- 2008: Eva Díaz Pérez for El Club de la Memoria
- 2009: Rubén Abella for El libro del amor esquivo
