= José C. Vales =

Spanish writer and translator (born 1965)

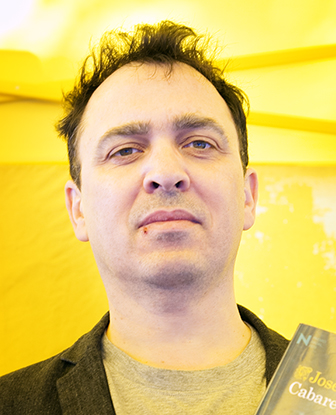
José C. Vales in 2015

José C. Vales (born 1965, Zamora) is a Spanish writer and translator of English literature. He studied in Salamanca and Madrid. He has translated numerous English and American authors into Spanish, including Dickens, Trollope, Austen, Wilkie Collins, Defoe, Mary Shelley, Arnold Bennett, Eudora Welty, Stella Gibbons, E. F. Benson, and Edmund Crispin.

He won the 2015 Premio Nadal for his novel Cabaret Biarritz.
