= Nada (novel) =

1945 novel by Spanish author Carmen Laforet

- Title page of the first edition
- Author: Carmen Laforet
- Translator: Edith Grossman
- Language: Spanish
- Genre: Novel
- Publisher: Destino
- Publication date: 1945
- Publication place: Spain
- English publication date: 2007
- Awards: Premio Nadal; 1944; Premio Fastenrath; 1948
- OCLC: 1151556910

Nada (Spanish for 'nothing') is the first novel by Spanish author Carmen Laforet, published in 1945.

== Plot ==
The novel is set in the post-Spanish Civil War Barcelona. The novel is narrated by its main character, Andrea, an orphan, who has fond memories of her well off family in Barcelona, and has been raised in a convent in provincial Spain.

The government has awarded Andrea a scholarship and a subsistence stipend so that she can attend university. She travels to Barcelona to the home of her grandmother, only to find it filthy and falling apart. Her frail, devoutly Catholic grandmother seems unaware of her miserable surroundings. Also living in the crumbling house is a strict, controlling aunt Angustias, a roguish, but musically talented uncle, Román, another uncle, Juan, who abuses his beautiful wife Gloria. The whole group regularly comes to blows throughout Andrea’s stay, and Angustias eventually escapes by entering a convent.

At the university, Andrea befriends a rich girl, Ena, who begins a strange relationship with Andrea's uncle Román. She pretends to care for him, but is really taking revenge for his poor treatment of her mother years before.

When Román gets involved in the black market, Gloria reports him to the authorities. He commits suicide, for fear of arrest by the Francoist police.

Ena and her family move to Madrid, and soon send for Andrea to join them. Ena’s father offers to give Andrea a job and subsidize her further education. In the final part of the novel, Andrea is picked up by the family’s fancy car, leaving behind her unpleasant life on Aribau Street in Barcelona.

== Reception ==
Nada was published in 1945, when LaForet was 23, and created a "sensation" in Barcelona when it came out. Nada won Laforet the first Premio Nadal literary prize in Spain.

This book passed the censorship of the Francoist State and so it avoids directly addressing the harshness of the government at the time. However, the book became very popular when it finally cleared Franco’s censors. It is considered to be an important contribution to the school of Existentialist literature of post-Civil War Spain.

In 2007 an English translation of Nada by Edith Grossman was published.

Fernández-Lamarque and Fernández-Babineaux see metatextual references with Little Red Riding Hood and gender inversion in the novel depicting Andrea and Ena as androgynous beings.
