= Eva Díaz Pérez =

Spanish journalist and writer

- Born: 1971 (age 54–55); Seville, Spain
- Education: University of Seville
- Occupations: Journalist, writer, teacher
- Employers: Centro Andaluz de las Letras; International University of Andalucía
- Awards: Málaga Novel Award (2013); Andalusian Journalism Award (2018)

Eva Díaz Pérez (born 1971) is a Spanish journalist and writer. She is also a teacher of cultural journalism at the EUSA University Center and a lecturer. She has received the Andalusian Journalism Award, and in July 2019 she was appointed director of the Centro Andaluz de las Letras (CAL).

== Biography ==
Eva Díaz Pérez has a licentiate in information sciences from the University of Seville. Her first job as a journalist was at the now-defunct Diario 16. She worked at El Mundo for more than 20 years as an editor specializing in cultural issues. She has been a contributor to the newspapers ABC and El País and the magazines Mercurio and Andalucía en la Historia.

She began her literary career in 2001 with the publication of the satirical book El polvo del camino. El libro maldito del Rocío. In 2003 and 2004 she was a finalist for the National Journalism Award. In 2005, the José Manuel Lara Foundation published her historical novel Memoria de cenizas, for which she received the 2008 Unamuno "Friend of the Protestants" Award from Protestante Digital, "for her important contribution to the recovery of the Protestant historical memory."

Also in 2005, she was a finalist for the Premio Nadal with her work El Club de la Memoria. In 2006, the Lara Foundation published her Hijos del Mediodía, which won RTVA's El Público Radio and Televisión Award for Andalusian Culture.

In 2011, Díaz published her fourth novel, El sonámbulo de Verdún, and in 2013, Adriático. The latter won the 7th Málaga Novel Award, as well as the Andalusian Critics Award in May 2014. In 2013 she received a literary career award from the Seville Book Fair. Journalism awards she has won include the Francisco Valdés, Unicaja, University of Seville, City of Málaga, and City of Huelva.

In 2017 she published the novel El color de los ángeles about the Baroque painter Bartolomé Esteban Murillo.

In non-fiction, Díaz is known for her essays La Andalucía del exilio (2008) and Travesías históricas: viajeros que contaron el mundo (2017), as well as the literary guide Sevilla, un retrato literario (2011). She is the co-author of the 2005 biography Salvador Távora. El sentimiento trágico de Andalucía.

She teaches literature courses at the CAL and the International University of Andalucía (UNIA), and gives lectures at foreign universities. She also teaches cultural journalism classes at the EUSA University Center, attached to the University of Seville, where she has worked since 2013.

In 2018 she won the Andalusian Journalism Award for "Google time", a series of cultural articles published in the magazine Andalucía en la Historia. She was the curator of the Año Murillo, Seville's multidisciplinary event to commemorate the 400th anniversary of the painter's birth.

In July 2019, Díaz won a competition convened by the Andalusian Ministry of Culture and Historical Heritage to determine the successor of Juan José Téllez Rubio as CAL director.

== Works ==
- El polvo del camino. El libro maldito del Rocío (2001), Signatura Ediciones de Andalucía, ISBN 84-95122-41-3
- Memoria de cenizas (2005), Fundación José Manuel Lara, ISBN 84-96152-38-3
- Salvador Távora. El sentimiento trágico de Andalucía (2005), Fundación José Manuel Lara, ISBN 84-96152-81-2
- Hijos del Mediodía (2006), Fundación José Manuel Lara, ISBN 84-96556-15-8
- La Andalucía del exilio (2008), Fundación José Manuel Lara, ISBN 9788496824331
- El Club de la Memoria (2008), Ediciones Destino, ISBN 978-84-233-4021-7
- Sevilla, un retrato literario (2011), Editorial Paréntesis, ISBN 978-84-9919-182-9
- El sonámbulo de Verdún (2011), Ediciones Destino, ISBN 978-84-233-4555-7
- Adriático (2013), Fundación José Manuel Lara, ISBN 978-84-96824-99-7
- El color de los ángeles (2017), Planeta, ISBN 9788408171126
- Travesías históricas: viajeros andaluces que contaron el mundo. (2017), Fundación José Manuel Lara, ISBN 9788415673293

== Awards and recognitions ==
=== Journalism ===
- 2003 and 2004 finalist for the National Journalism Award
- 1997 City of Huelva Award
- 2008 City of Málaga Award
- 2008 University of Seville Journalism Award
- 2012 Unicaja Award for Journalistic Articles
- 2015 Francisco Valdés Journalism Award
- 2018 Andalusian Journalism Award

=== Literature ===
- 2005 Unamuno Award
- 2006 RTVA El Público Award
- 2008 finalist for the Premio Nadal
- 2013 Andalusian Critics Award
- 2013 Málaga Novel Award
- 2013 Seville Book Fair Career Award
