= Rafael Argullol =

Spanish writer

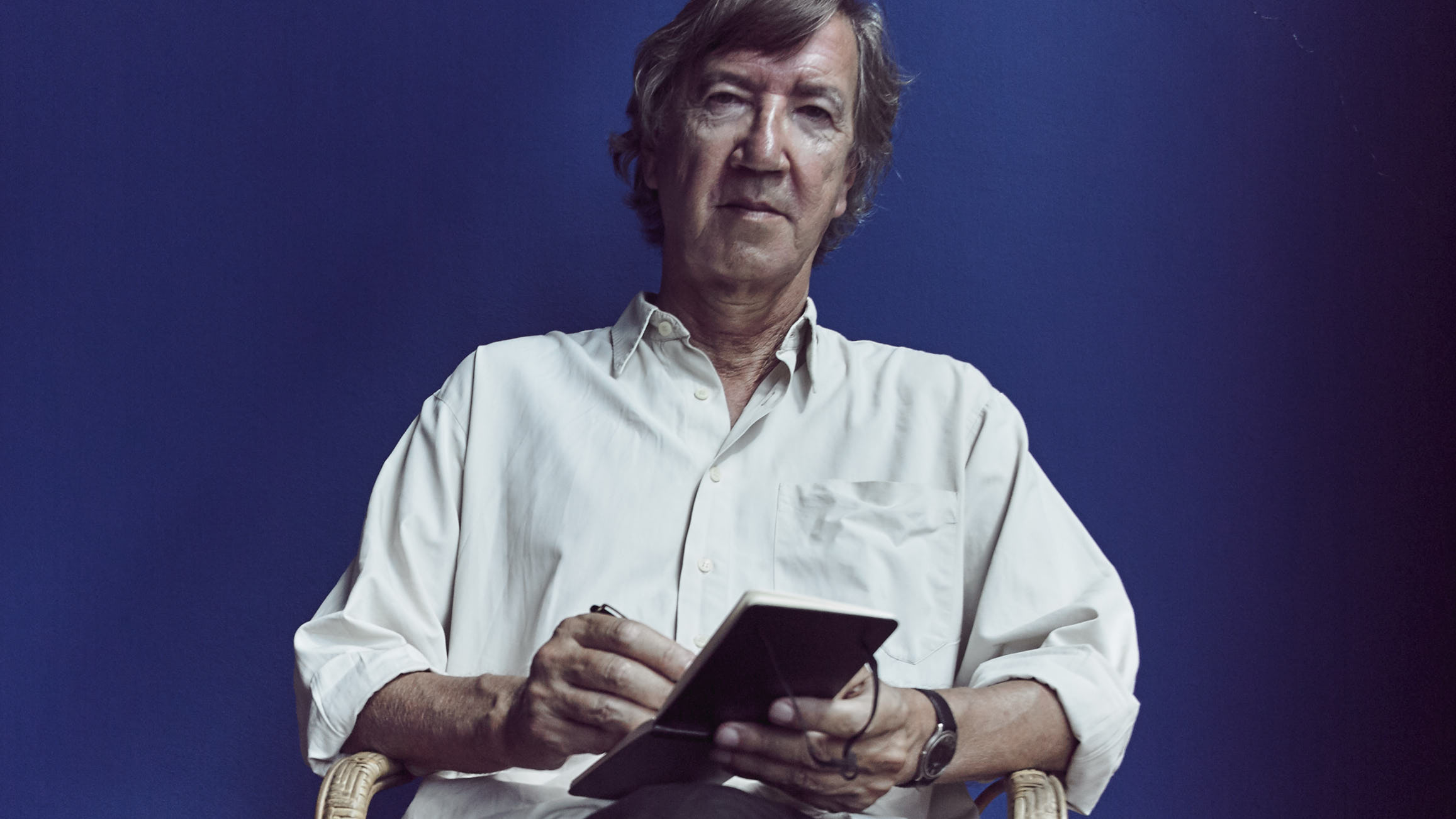
Rafael Argullol Murgadas

Rafael Argullol Murgadas (Catalan pronunciation: [rəf(ə)ˈɛl əɾɣuˈʎɔl]; Barcelona 1949) is a Spanish writer, philosopher, poet and professor of aesthetics at Pompeu Fabra University from Catalonia. The author of more than 30 books, he was granted the 1993 Nadal prize for his novel La razón del mal, the 2002 Fondo de Cultura Económica essay prize for Una educación sensorial, and the 2010 Cálamo prize and the Ciutat de Barcelona prize in the same year for his book Vision desde el fondo del mar.
