= Carmen Nonell =

Catalan novelist (born 1920)

- Born: 1920; Barcelona, Spain
- Citizenship: Spain
- Occupation: Writer
- Relatives: Carolina Nonell (sister); Isidre Nonell (uncle)
- Writing career
- Language: Catalan, Spanish
- Period: 1942-1973
- Notable work: Zoco grande (1956)

Carme Nonell i Masjuan (born 1920) was a Catalan novelist who wrote in Spanish. She was trained as an artist in Madrid. She worked for ABC and served as a Berlin-based correspondent for Pueblo. Beyond novels, she also wrote about Spanish art and wrote tourist publications.

== Selected works ==
=== Novels ===
- ¿Es usted mi marido?, (1942)
- Nocturno de amor, (1944)
- El Mayorazgo de Iziar, (1945)
- Caminos cruzados, (1946)
- El cauce perdido, (1946)
- Cumbres de amor (195?)
- Resurgir, (1953)
- Historia de "Farol", (1953)
- Zoco grande, (1956)
- Munich, Leopoldstrasse, 207, (1962)
- La vida empieza hoy, (1965)
- Los que se quedan, (1967)
- La "Perrona", (1967)

=== Art guides ===
- Berlín, capital de dos mundos, (1963)
- Rutas de España: Valencia. Aragón, (1963)
- Rutas de España: La Rioja, Vascongadas (Guipozcoa, Vizcaya, Álava) y Navarra, (1967)
- Guías Everest: El Pirineo catalán, (1969), co-written with her sister Carolina Nonell.
- El arte asturianense, (1969)
- Teruel, ignorada maravilla, (1969)
- Guadalajara, nudo de la Alcarria, (1971).
- Cerámica y alfarería populares de España, (1973)

=== Children's literature ===
- Los dos castillos, (1944)
- Gato y la estrella, (1966)

=== Guides ===
- Los cinco (Balakiref, César, Cui, Barodin, Mussorgsky i Rimsky-Korsakof), (1948)
