= Carmen Laforet =

Spanish author

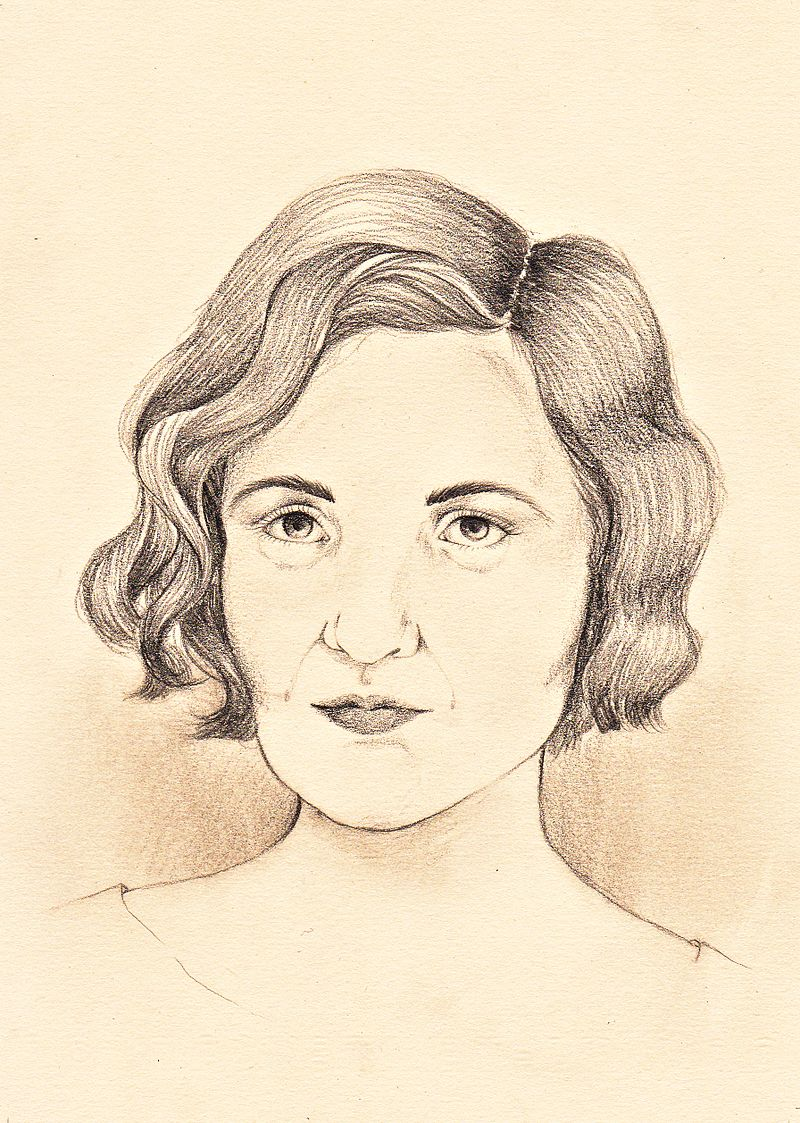
Portrait of Carmen Laforet

Carmen Laforet (Barcelona 6 September 1921 – Madrid, 28 February 2004) was a Spanish author who wrote in the period after the Spanish Civil War. An important European writer, her works contributed to the school of Existentialist Literature and her first novel Nada continued the Spanish tremendismo literary style begun by Camilo José Cela with his novel, La familia de Pascual Duarte. She received the Premio Nadal in 1944.

== Biography ==
Laforet was born in Barcelona, Spain, but at the age of 2 she moved with her family to the Canary Islands where she spent her childhood. At age 12 she suffered the loss of her mother, and her father subsequently married a woman disliked by Laforet and her siblings (unsavory experiences portrayed in much of her literature). In 1939 at the age of 18, Laforet left for Barcelona where she studied Philosophy at the University of Barcelona while living with relatives. In 1942 she departed for Madrid where she studied Law at the Universidad Complutense. During her second year, she withdrew from classes to devote herself completely to writing, and between January and September 1944 she penned her first novel, Nada, which earned Editorial Destino's Nadal Prize in its first year of publication (1945). A novel of female adolescent development, Nada is considered a classic in 20th century Spanish literature, and deals with such themes as existentialism and the adolescent search for identity.

Laforet maintained a very distrustful relationship with her critics, especially after she struggled to match the outstanding critical acclaim of her first novel. However, she did publish a total of five novels: the 1952 publication of La Isla y los demonios, which is essentially the prequel to Nada; her 1955 La mujer nueva, motivated by her re-discovery of her Catholic faith and recipient of the Premio Menorca; her 1963 La insolación, the initial installment of the trilogy Tres pasos fuera del tiempo; and finally the posthumous psychological novel Al volver la esquina, published in May 2004.

Following her visit to the U.S. as a guest of the State Department in 1965, Laforet published her travel notes entitled Parelelo 35 in 1967. Her friendship with fellow Spanish author and U.S. resident Ramón J. Sender was revealed in a series of letters published in 2003 entitled Puedo contar contigo. She also authored short stories, the majority of which were published in a 1952 collection entitled La muerta, as well as novelettes that were published in a 1954 collection entitled La llamada. Four additional short stories — El infierno, Recién casados, El alivio, and El secreto de la gata — were published in the journals Ínsula (1944 & 1952), Destino (June 1953) and Bazar (March 1952) respectively. In 1987 she started post-graduate studies in Literature at Georgetown University.

During her later years Laforet suffered from Alzheimer's disease, eventually losing the ability to speak. She died in Madrid on 28 February 2004.

Nada, her most successful novel, has remained consistently in print. The publication in 2003 of Puedo contar contigo, a selection of her correspondence with Ramón J. Sender edited by Israel Rolón Barada, and the reissue of her 1955 novel, La mujer nueva, with a prologue by the same editor, however, led to renewed interest in her work, bolstered by a new English translation of Nada by Edith Grossman in 2007. In February 2007, as a commemoration of the third anniversary of her death, the Editorial Menoscuarto published for the first time a compilation of all her short stories, including five previously unpublished stories. In 2009 Cristina Cerezales published a second book about her mother, Música Blanca (Destino).

== Tributes ==
In 2010 a school with her name was built in the neighborhood of Valderribas, in the district of Vicálvaro (Madrid).

In 2011 she was awarded, posthumously, with the Can de Plata de Gran Canaria, in the category of Arts, given by the Cabildo Insular de Gran Canaria.

There are some streets with her name in Santiago de Compostela, Estepona (Málaga), in the neighborhood of Aguas Vivas (Guadalajara), in Majadahonda, in Torrejon de Ardoz and in the neighborhood of Soto del Henares (Madrid). Some streets in the towns of Las Palmas and San Bartolomé de Tirajana on the island of Gran Canaria were also named Carmen Laforet.

In 2004 a series of biographies dedicated to Carmen Laforet were published and directed by the writer Nuria Amat.

In 2014 The Instituto Cervantes in New York (United States) paid tribute to the author in one of its cultural activities to commemorate the seventieth anniversary of the publication of her book Nada.

A square in Barcelona was named after her: Plaça de Carmen Laforet. The square has a plaque where it can be read in Catalan: "Carmen Laforet (Barcelona 1921-Madrid 2004)... Escriptora ... Va néixer en aquesta casa, font d'inspiració de la seva primera novel·la Nada" which means: "Carmen Laforet (Barcelona 1921-Madrid 2004).. Writer ... Was born in this house, the source of inspiration for her first novel Nada."

== Filmography ==
In 1947, a version of the novel Nada was brought to the big screen. The full-length film was directed by Edgar Nevile. Actors such as Conchita Montes, Rafael Bardem, María Denis and Fosco Giachetti, among others, took part on it. Because of the censorship of those years, thirty minutes of the film were cut and many of the scenes shot in Barcelona were obliterated.

Later, in 1956, Argentina brought to the big screen what would be an adaptation of the novel Nada, a black and white drama directed by Leopoldo Torre Nilsson.

== Works ==
The literary production of the writer is wide. After the death of her mother, her father married a woman with whom Carmen did not have a good relationship. This situation was reflected in three of her works. These works, which have orphans as main characters are Nada (1945), La isla y sus demonios (1952) and La insolación (1963).

The Spanish writer tried to combine her feelings in each of her works. Several authors insist on her feminist vision, although her mystical vision of the world, should be pointed out, especially in her work La mujer nueva, whose main point is the faith of the main character. The main character of this work is Paulina, a woman who goes from criticizing the Church to practising the Catholic religion, a change she chooses on her own. Paulina stopped having a sinful life, as she had a son born out of wedlock and she also had a relationship with another man. Thus, in this work the freedom of the women to choose another way of life is joined with mysticism. This could be due to the religious belief of the author, because in the correspondence that remained for a long time with writer Ramon J. Sender, she claims to believe in God.

Intrigue and mystery are also present in many of her works. This author could be considered the precursor of the detective novel in Spain because, although currently this is a rising genre and it was started some time ago, she had done it thirty years earlier than other authors.

Laforet's works paint a dark picture of Spanish society under the dictatorship of Francisco Franco, in some cases using foreign characters visiting Spain to present an outsider's view, for example, Martin, a character of her work Al volver de la esquina, published posthumously by the publisher Destino in 2004, the same year as her death. The complexity of the narrative structure, which testifies the evolution of the author's narrative, is remarkable. Al volver de la esquina is part of a trilogy entitled Tres pasos fuera del tiempo, together with La insolación and Jaque mate. This is an unfinished trilogy because, despite having talked about it in her correspondence with Ramón J. Sender, she died before publication of the final volume (in fact, nobody knows whether or not it was actually written).

Other works by the author are:

- Nada (1944), novel.
- La isla y los demonios (1952), novel.
- El piano (1952), novel.
- La muerta (1952), short stories.
- Un noviazgo (1953), short novel.
- El viaje divertido (1954), short novel.
- La niña (1954), short novel.
- Los emplazados (1954), short novel.
- La llamada (1954), story.
- La mujer nueva (1955), novel.
- Un matrimonio (1956), novel.
- Gran Canaria (1961), essay.
- La insolación (1963), novel.
- Paralelo 35 (1967), travel book.
- La niña y otros relatos (1970), stories.
- Artículos literarios (1977), a collection of articles.
- Mi primer viaje a USA (1981) essay.
- Rosamunda, story included in Cuentos de este siglo, Encinar, Ángeles (ed.), Barcelona, 1995.
- Al colegio, story included in Madres e hijas, Freixas, Laura (ed.), Barcelona, 1996.
- Al volver la esquina (2004), posthumous novel. Continues the story of La insolación.
- Carta a Don Juan (2007), a compilation of all her short stories.
- Romeo y Julieta II (2008), a compilation of her love stories.

=== Translations into English ===
- Nada translated by Edith Grossman, Modern Library, 2007
- Take Six: Six Spanish Women Writers, edited and translated by Kathryn Phillips-Miles and Simon Deefholts: Dedalus Books, 2022. (Contains a selection of Carmen Laforet’s stories in English translation).

== Legacy ==
Since Laforet's death on 28 February 2004, renewed critical attention has focused on her lesser known works (essentially everything published after Nada), yet undoubtedly the public will always think of Nada when Laforet's name is mentioned, as evidenced by the Spanish phrase, Después de Nada, nada, or After Nada, nothing. On her 100th birthday, Laforet was honoured with a Google Doodle.

== See also ==
- Existentialism
- Spanish Literature
- Spanish Civil War
