= Ana María Matute =

Spanish author

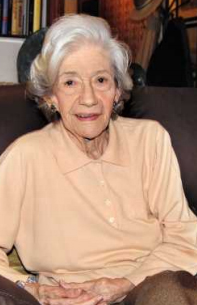
- Born: 26 July 1925; Barcelona, Spain
- Died: 25 June 2014 (aged 88); Barcelona, Spain
- Resting place: Cemetery of Montjuïc
- Occupation: Writer
- Organization: Member of the Real Academia Española
- Awards: Cervantes Prize

Seat K of the Real Academia Española
- In office 18 January 1998 – 25 June 2014
- Preceded by: Carmen Conde
- Succeeded by: Federico Corriente

Ana María Matute Ausejo (Spanish: [ˈana maˈɾia maˈtute awˈsexo]; 26 July 1925 – 25 June 2014) was a Spanish writer and member of the Real Academia Española. In 1959, she received the Premio Nadal for Primera memoria. The third woman to receive the Cervantes Prize for her literary oeuvre, she is considered one of the foremost novelists of the posguerra, the period immediately following the Spanish Civil War.

== Biography ==
Matute was born on 26 July 1925. At the age of four she almost died from a chronic kidney infection, and was taken to live with her grandparents in Mansilla de la Sierra, a small town in the mountains, for a period of recovery. Matute says that she was profoundly influenced by the villagers whom she met during her time there. This influence can be seen in such works as those published in her 1961 collection Historias de la Artámila (Stories from Artámila), all of which deal with the people that Matute met during her recovery. Settings reminiscent of that town are also often used as settings for her other work.

Matute was ten years old when the Spanish Civil War broke out in 1936, and this internecine conflict is said to have had the greatest impact on Matute's writing. She considered not only "the battles between the two factions, but also the internal aggression within each side".

Following the fascist victory in 1939, Francisco Franco established a military dictatorship, which lasted thirty-six years until his death in 1975. Since Matute matured as a writer in this posguerra period under the dictatorship, some of the most recurrent themes in her works are violence, alienation, misery, and especially the loss of innocence. Her work was heavily censored under Franco and she was blacklisted from working as a journalist. At least once she was fined because of her writings.

She published her first story, The Boy Next Door, when she was only 17 years old. Matute was known for her sympathetic treatment of the lives of children and adolescents, their feelings of betrayal and isolation, and their rites of passage. She often interjected such elements as myth, fairy tale, the supernatural, and fantasy into her works. She was outspoken about subjects such as the benefits of emotional suffering, the constant changing of a human being, and how innocence is never completely lost.

Matute was a university professor. She studied at the international school at Hilversum, Netherlands, and traveled to various countries as a lecturer or guest instructor. Her academic work in the United States spanned four decades, beginning as early as 1966 when she spoke at Our Lady of Cincinnati College.

She lectured at the Tatem Arts Center of Hood College in Maryland on 28 April 1969. In 1978, she was a visiting professor at the University of Virginia. She was invited to speak at Brigham Young University in Utah on 12 March 1990, where she gave a lecture on Working the Craft of Translation in Spanish. She was also a guest lecturer at the universities of Oklahoma, Indiana and Virginia.

She was an honorary member of the Hispanic Society of America and a member of the American Association of Teachers of Spanish and Portuguese.

Many of her works won her the most important Spanish literary prizes including the Premio Nadal in 1958 for the first novel of the trilogy, Los Mercaderes, the Planeta Prize and the Café Gijón Prize.

In 2010 she was awarded the Cervantes Prize, the Spanish-speaking world's highest literary honour. She was nominated for the Nobel Prize in Literature in 1976.

== Death ==
On 25 June 2014, Matute died of a heart attack at the age of 88, and was laid to rest in the Cemetery of Montjuïc, Barcelona.

== External Resources ==
The Hispanic Division, located at the Library of Congress in Washington, DC, has a special recording of Ana María Matute herself reading from her prose work Algunos muchachos. Recorded on 5 May 2000, this Spanish author recorded her reading of this work in Spanish at the Library of Congress. The recording of Matute herself is located in the Archive of Hispanic Literature, which can be located online. Contents include from Algunos muchachos: "Prologue" (2:54); "El rey de los zennos - I" (min. 4:13); II (min 14:21); III (min. 28:31).

== Bibliography ==
Matute's bibliography includes:

=== Novels ===
- (1948) Los Abel (finalist for Premio Nadal)
- (1949) Luciérnagas (blocked by censors, republished as En esta tierra in 1955) (semifinalist for Premio Nadal)
- (1953) Fiesta al noroeste (translated as Celebration in the Northwest) (Premio Café Gijón)
- (1954) Pequeño teatro (Premio Planeta)
- (1955) En esta tierra (republished as Luciérnagas in 1993, translated as Fireflies)
- (1958) Los hijos muertos (Premio de la Crítica, Premio Nacional de Literatura)
- The semiautobiographical trilogy collected as Los mercaderes (1977):
  - (1960) Primera memoria (translated as School of the Sun and 'The Island') (Premio Nadal)
  - (1964) Los soldados lloran de noche (translated as Soldiers Cry By Night) (Fastenrath Award)
  - (1969) La trampa (translated as The Trap)
- (1964) Algunos muchachos
- The medieval trilogy:
  - (1971) La torre vigía
  - (1996) Olvidado Rey Gudú (Premio de RNE Ojo Crítico Especial)
  - (2000) Aranmanoth
- (2001) En el tren (contributor)
- (2008) Paraíso inhabitado
- (2014) Demonios familiares (posthumous)

=== Story collections ===
- (1953) La pequeña vida (later republished as El tiempo)
- (1957) El tiempo
- (1956) Los niños tontos
- (1961) El arrepentido y otras narraciones
- (1961) Historias de la Artámila
- (1961) Tres y un sueño
- (1961) Libro de juegos para los niños de los otros
- (1963) El río (columns from weekly magazine Destino)
- (1989) The Heliotrope Wall and Other Stories (translated by Michael Scott Doyle)
- (1990) La virgen de Antioquía y otros relatos
- (1991) El árbol de oro
- (1993) De ninguna parte (Premio del Concurso Antonio Machado de Narraciones Breves)
- (1997) Casa de juegos prohibidos (selected and introduced by Pedro Manuel Víllora)
- (1998) Los de la tienda; El maestro; La brutalidad del mundo
- (2000) Todos mis cuentos
- (2002) Cuentos de infancia (collection of stories written as a child)
- (2011) Las Artámilas
- (2014) Demonios familiares
- (2010) La puerta de la luna: Cuentos completos

=== Novels and stories for children ===
- (1956) El país de la pizarra
- (1960) Paulina, el mundo y las estrellas (Ministerio de Cultura libro de interés juvenil)
- (1961) El saltamontes verde
- (1961) El caballito loco
- (1965) El Polizón Del Ulises (Premio Nacional de Literatura Infantil Lazarillo)
- (1972) El aprendiz
- (1972) Carnavalito
- (1983) Sólo un pie descalzo (Premio Nacional de Literatura Infantil y Juvenil)
- (1994) La oveja negra
- (1995) El verdadero final de la Bella Durmiente (Premio Ciudad de Barcelona)
- (2003) Tolín

=== Essays ===
- (1961) A la mitad del camino (columns from the newspaper Solidaridad Nacional and weekly magazine Destino)
- (2004) Suiza y la migración
