= Eidolon =

Spirit-images in ancient Greek literature

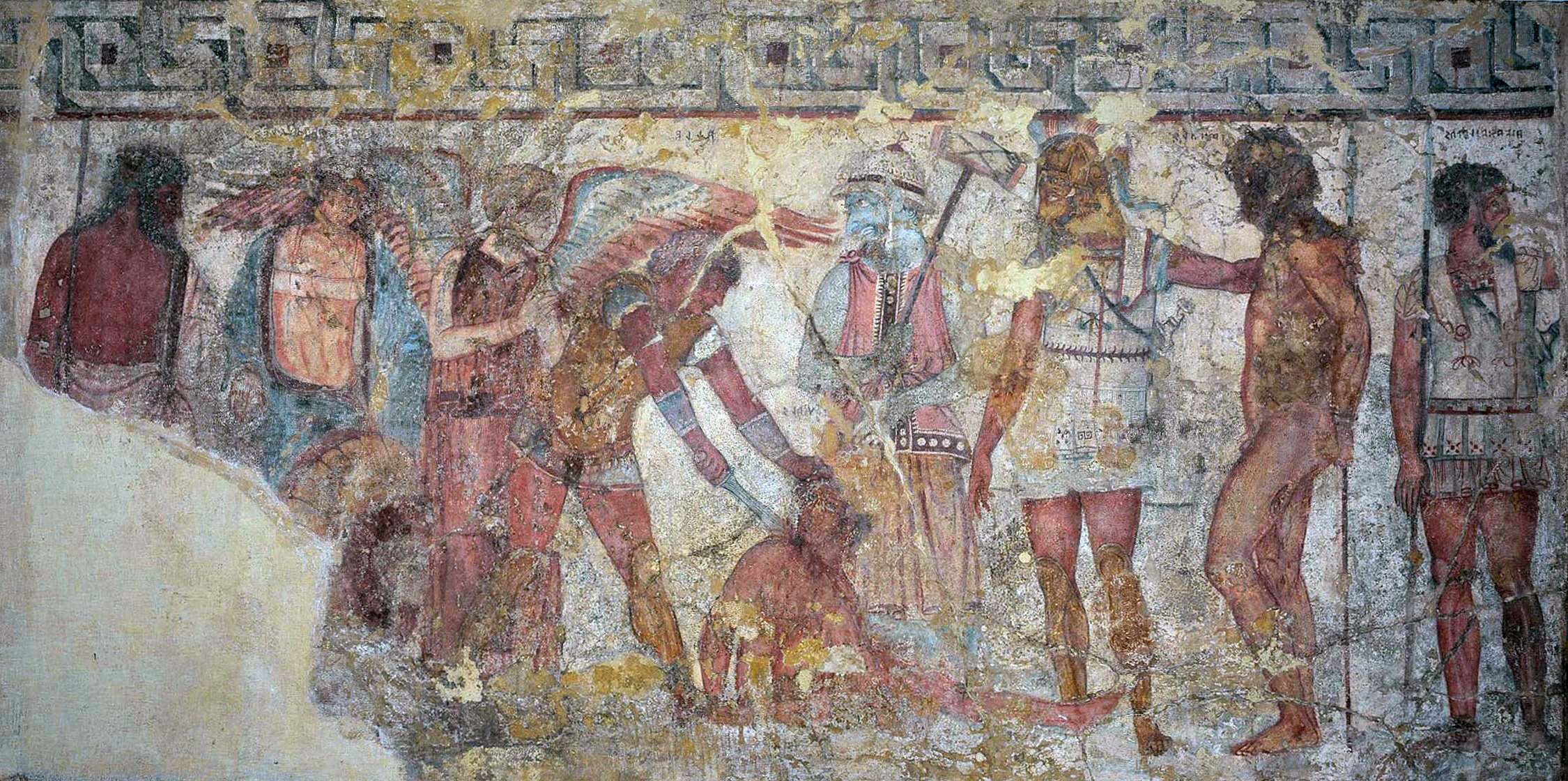
Achilles' sacrifice of Trojan prisoners, 4th-century BC fresco from Vulci. The eidolon of Patroclus is second from left.

In ancient Greek literature, an eidolon (/aɪˈdoʊlɒn/; Ancient Greek: εἴδωλον 'image, idol, double, apparition, phantom, ghost'; plural: eidola or eidolons) is a spirit-image of a living or dead person; a shade or phantom look-alike of the human form. In the Homeric epic, it plays two functions: one as an image of the dead; and, as the deceased in propria persona.

== Literary use ==
The concept of Helen of Troy's eidolon was explored both by Homer and Euripides. Homer uses the concept as a free-standing idea that gives Helen life after death. Euripides entangles it with the idea of kleos, the one being the product of the other. Both Euripides and Stesichorus, in their works concerning the Trojan Horse, use the concept of the eidolon to claim that Helen was never physically present in the city at all.

The concept of the eidola of the dead has been explored in literature regarding Penelope, who in later works was constantly laboring against the eidola of Clytemnestra and later of Helen herself. Homer's use of eidola also extends to the Odyssey where, after the death of the suitors of Penelope, Theoclymenus notes that he sees the doorway of the court filled with them.

In "Dream-Land", an 1844 poem by Edgar Allan Poe, an eidolon rules over a realm haunted by "ill angels only" and reserved for the ones whose "woes are legion" and who "walk in shadow".

Walt Whitman's 1876 poem "Eidolons" used a much broader understanding of the term, expanded and detailed in the poem. In Whitman's use, the term is broadened to include the concept of an oversoul composed of the individual souls of all life and expanding to include the Earth itself and the hierarchy of the planets, Sun, stars and galaxy.

Sandeep Parmar's collection Eidolon won the Ledbury Prize for a second collection.

In the Italian Disney comic book PKNA, there is a character named Odin Eidolon who is a body double for the character One.

Eidolons are prominently featured in Kazuhiro Fujita's manga The Ghost and the Lady. Here, they are featured as demonic entities that attach themselves to living humans and gain power from the negative emotions of the living.

In the video game Genshin Impact, the summer 2023 flagship event featured the Veluriyam Mirage, a pocket universe populated by shapeshifting elemental creatures called Hydro Eidolons. The event's story revolved around the ability of these creatures to involuntarily transform into and absorb the memories of people who visited the Mirage in the past, while being unaware of their own true nature.

In the video game Warframe, there is an open world section called the Plains of Eidolon which contain the Eidolons who are the spectral fragments of a giant Sentient that was shattered after a battle with Gara, one of the Tenno

== See also ==
- Doppelgänger
- Etiäinen
- Fetch (folklore)
- Vardøger
- Avatar
