= Qareen =

Spiritual double of human in Islam

A qareen (Arabic: قرين, romanized: qarīn, lit. 'constant companion') is a spiritual double of a human, either part of the human themself or a complementary creature in a parallel realm.

The qareen belongs to the jinn in regards to its ghostly nature, yet distinct from jinn. Although the qareen can be either a devil or an angel, they are more often associated with malevolent spirits tempting into sin.

The idea of a spiritual double accompanying humans might be a remnant of older Near Eastern beliefs, such as the Egypt kꜣ which in turn resembles the Babylonian idea of an undefined personal deity accompanying a person.

The Qareen as an accompanying spirit should not be confused with the Qarinah, a female "childbed demon" in Middle Eastern traditions.

== Qareen in Islam ==
=== Quran ===
In the Quran, the concept of a Qareen is absent. The term, meaning "companion" appears a few times, but without any demonic associations. Hans Alexander Winkler noted that the Quranic reference to a Qareen refers to an earthly companion like a friend, who influences a Muslim to leave the Islamic community. Even the "satan" mentioned in 43:36 refers to a human tempter (shaytan al ins), not a spiritual entity. It is only in the hadith that spiritual company is clearly associated with the term Qareen. Here, it refers to either a demon or angel. Only in later folklore is a Qareen considered a spiritual doppelganger of an individual human.

The term Qareen is mentioned in the following Quran verses without necessarily referring to any type of spiritual creature:

Sūrat az-Zukhruf: "And whosoever turns away from remembering and mentioning the Most Beneficent, we appoint for him a Satan to be a Qareen to him."

Sūrat as-Saffat: "A speaker among them will say, 'Indeed, I had a Qareen.'"

Sūrat an-Nisa: "And those who spend of their wealth to be seen by the people and believe not in Allah nor in the Last Day. And he to whom Satan is a Qareen - then evil is he as a Qareen."

Sūrat Qaf: "And his Qareen, will say, 'This is what is with me, prepared.'"

=== Hadith ===
Muhammad's qarin is said to have submitted to islam, which means, that he has trained his lower faculties (nafs) and turned his lust, greed, and delusions, into obedience to God. He achieved insan-kamil, the perfect human-being to whom the shaytan bows down.

A hadith from Al-Tirmidhi which regarded authentic by al-Albani has transmitted a chain of narration which ended at 'Abd Allah ibn Mas'ud, that he reported Muhammad has said:

"Indeed a Shaitan whispers to humans, angels also whisper. Whispers of the shaitan promised evil and denying the truth. Meanwhile, the angel's whisper promises goodness and truth. Whoever gets it, then know that it is from Allah Azza wa Jalla, then let him praise Allah Azza wa Jalla. And whoever gets something else, then he should seek refuge in Allah Azza wa Jalla from the cursed devil".

Then Abd Allah ibn Mas'ud said in his report that Muhammad continues by recited the Quran chapter Al-Baqara verse 268. A hadith from Sahih Muslim has transmitted a chain of narration which ended at 'Abd Allah ibn Mas'ud, that he reported Muhammad has said

"Each of you has been sent for him a qarin (companion) from the jinn kind." The group of Sahabah asked, "Including you, O Messenger of Allah?", which replied by Muhammad, "Including me, only God helped me to subdue him, until he converted to Islam. Therefore, he does not whispered anything to me except goodness.".

Another Hadith from Sahih Muslim also stated that Muhammad said “Every one of you has been sent a companion from among the jinn.”

=== Interpretation ===
Several opinions exist on the exact nature of the Qareen. Generally the term Qareen refers to any type of spirit accompanying humans. The Qareen refers to devils (shaytan), who give evil suggestions (waswās) and angels who counsel towards good deeds. While the Qareen might be remnicent of spirits inspiring poetry in pre-Islamic Arabia, the Qareen Islamic monotheism gradually shifted them into a negative role.

Ibn Hanbal stated that one has a qareen from the devils and a qareen from the angels" (malak). Tabari cites a tradition (hadith) that every human has a qareen from the devils advising evil and an angel accompanied advising good. Suyuti is unsure if the qareen in Surah 50:23 refers to a devil or angel. He does identify the qareen in Surah 50:27 with a devil though.

Al-Uthaymin has stated that Qareen is an evil jinn (evil spirit) who is tasked to lead human astray with God's permission to test the faith of humans, as interpretation of al-Baqara chapter in verse 268.

Some identify the Qareen not as a separate being but as the "other self": a spirit integral to the person. A dissent between the inner Qareen and behavior may cause the same symptoms as Jinn-possession.

== Other sources ==
The concept of a Qareen appears in pre-Islamic literature as well, and is reminiscent of the Greek daimones and the Christian guardian angel. In Pre-Islamic Arabian myth the Qareen is said to be able to inspire poets for their works.

How prevalent it is in folk belief varies by country. For example, it is more popular in Egypt than Sudan. It is possible the concept in Egypt has been influenced by the older concept of the ka. In some cases (such as that of holy men), the qarin or karin persists after a person has died. In Egypt, both Copts and Muslims believe in the qarin, and believe it may turn into a cat or dog at night. Amulets are used to guard against the qarin, especially if it is jealous. Pregnant women in Egypt used to visit a sheikha three months before birth to ask their counsel on ensuring their qarina does not harm their child. The prescribed rituals and amulets usually involve the number seven. Brides in Upper Egypt also wore amulets against their qarin.

Many Russian and Turkish Muslims believe the qarin is present in the womb with the person it's attached to.

One of the seven mu'allaqat—Arabic poems recognized as masterpieces during the pre-Islamic period—uses the word as a metaphor. To describe his tribe's excellence in battle, poet Amr bin Kulthum says that "every tribe has taken fear of us as a qarin (or 'constant companion')," meaning that their fear of Amr's tribe is always present. This goes further to show the origin of the word qareen, as described in the Arabic dictionary as a "companion".

== See also ==
- Angel
- Bicameral mentality
- Dmuta in Mandaeism
- Doppelgänger
- Etiäinen
- Familiar spirit
- Genii
- Ikiryō
- Jinn
- Shadow (psychology)
- Tulpa
- Winged genie
