= Kefitzat haderech =

Kabbalistic term that literally means "contracting the path

Kefitzat Haderech (Hebrew: קְפִיצַת הַדֶּרֶךְ, romanized: qəp̄îṣáṯ haddéreḵ, lit. 'contraction of the road') is a Hebrew term used in Jewish sources, referring to miraculous travel between two distant places in a brief time.

== Etymology ==
In modern Hebrew the root kafatz (קפץ) means to jump, suggesting that the traveler has "jumped" to a distant location. However, in the original Talmudic context, the root means "to clench" or "to contract": that is, the route itself is shortened.

== In Jewish sources ==
The Torah has the first reference to kefitzat haderech during the story of Eliezer, Abraham's manservant; he travels to find a wife for Isaac from among Abraham's family, where he eventually finds and leaves with Rebecca (Genesis, 24:42). When Eliezer speaks to Bethuel and Lavan, the father and brother of Rivkah, he states: "I came today to the spring, and I said: O Lord, God of my master Abraham, if You would indeed grant success to the errand on which I am engaged." Rashi states that the usage of "I came today" indicates that "Today I started on my journey and today I have arrived here. Hence we may infer that the earth (the road) shrank for him (i.e that the journey was shortened in a miraculous manner)" and uses the literal phrase קפיצת הדרך to reference this phenomenon.

The Talmud lists several biblical stories in which, it claims, kefitzat haderech occurred.

The Babylonian Talmud writes that astrologers told Sennacherib:

The astrologers said to Sennacherib: If you go and conquer them now, you will overcome the Jewish people; and if not, you will not overcome the Jewish people. The Gemara relates: He walked and traversed in one day a road upon which one must walk for ten days in order to traverse it.

— Sanhedrin 95a:3

The Jerusalem Talmud tells the story of a farmer who, chasing his runaway ox, managed to travel from Israel to Babylonia in a single day.

A person was ploughing. His cow broke away before him and started running. He ran and ran after her until he found himself in Babylonia. They asked him, when did you leave? He answered, today. They asked him, by which [road] did you come? He answered them, by this one, come and see it. He went out, wanted to see it, and did no longer recognize it.

— Maaser Sheni 5:2

When Natronai ben Hilai was rumored to have used kefitzat haderech to travel from Babylonia to France and back, Hai ben Sherira rejected the possibility, and suggested instead that an impersonator may have claimed to be Natronai.

In early stories of the Hasidic movement, wonder-working rabbis are ascribed the ability to reach destinations with unnatural speed.

== In Agnon's work ==
Shmuel Yosef Agnon, an Israeli writer who won the 1966 Nobel Prize for literature, incorporates this phenomenon into some of his plots. In an Agnon story based on one of the above-mentioned Hasidic folktales, a righteous rabbi is given the gift of kfitzat haderech and uses it to "jump" into the treasuries of the Habsburg Empire, take sacks full of newly minted gold coins, and jump back to his shtetl, unnoticed by anybody. He uses the money to help poor or persecuted Jews, and the story implies that the power would be taken away should he take any of the gold for himself.

Later, when the Emperor plans to make decrees harmful to the Jews, the Rabbi uses his power of kfitzat haderech in order to jump into the audience chamber and beat the Emperor with his stick—being visible (and tangible) to the Emperor himself, but invisible to his councilors and guards.

== In science fiction ==
=== Frank Herbert's Dune ===
Science fiction novelist Frank Herbert's concept for the messiah, the Kwisatz Haderach or "Shortening of the Path" is likely identical with kefitzat haderech, "Shortening of the Path".

Emanuel Lotem's 1989 translation of Dune into Modern Hebrew uses the concepts interchangeably.

While Frank Herbert seems to use the term to reference the messiah himself, the Golden Path, a major plot point in the later books of the franchise, and the purpose of the Kwisatz Haderach (to steer humanity on the Golden Path, thus 'shortening the path' humanity must take to survive long-term) may be the reason he chose to use the term.

=== Philip Reeve's Railhead ===
In his Railhead trilogy science-fiction author Philip Reeve introduced a galactic interstellar railway system, the K-Bahn which is based on a network of K-gates, portal-like gateways utilizing an extradimensional non-space to achieve instant arrival after departure, thus "shortening the way". As explained in the novel Railhead itself, the "K" in this terminology stands for "Kefitzat Haderech", referred to as an expression in "one of the languages of Old Earth".

== See also ==
- Bilocation
- Shukuchi
- Hyperspace
- Lung-gom-pa
- Tay al-Ard
- Teleportation
- Teleportation in fiction
- Fast travel
