= Tay al-Ard =

Mystical form of teleportation in Islam

Tay al-Arḍ (Arabic: طيّ الأرض, romanized: ṭayy al-adḍ, lit. 'folding up of the earth') is the name for thaumaturgical teleportation in occult traditions of Islam. The concept has been expressed as "traversing the earth without moving"; some have termed it "moving by the earth being displaced under one's feet". It is a concept widely familiar to the Shia and to Sufis, each group having a different interpretation of it.

== Definitions and discussion ==
The Dehkhoda Dictionary defines Tay al-Ard as "[a] type of karamat in which instead of moving toward a destination by taking a step forward, the earth turns toward the traverser rapidly, no matter how far the destination be."

The concept of tay al-arḍ has its roots in the following verses of surah al-Naml of the Quran:

[Solomon] said, "O assembly [of jinn], which of you will bring me her throne before they come to me in submission?" A powerful one from among the jinn said, "I will bring it to you before you rise from your place, and indeed, I am for this [task] strong and trustworthy." Said one who had knowledge from the Scripture, "I will bring it to you before your glance returns to you." And when [Solomon] saw it placed before him, he said, "This is from the favor of my Lord to test me whether I will be grateful or ungrateful. And whoever is grateful - his gratitude is only for [the benefit of] himself. And whoever is ungrateful - then indeed, my Lord is Free of need and Generous."

— Qur'an, sura 27 (An-Naml), ayat 38–40

Some claim that according to these verses, it is Asif ibn Barkhiya who transports the throne of the Queen of Sheba almost instantaneously. According to them, a hadith by Ja'far al-Sadiq also confirms that Solomon transported the throne by tay al-arḍ.

A precise definition of tay al-arḍ has been offered by Ali Tabatabaei, one of the masters of Muhammad Husayn Tabataba'i: "[T]he ceasing and termination of matter in the initial location, and its appearance and re-creation in its final location (destination)".

Other explanations offered are also mystical in nature. A hadith by Muhammad al-Baqir is narrated in which he attributes the aforementioned esoteric knowledge of Asif ibn Barakhia to the Asma 'ullah or the "names of God", another widely discussed topic in Islamic philosophy, mysticism, and kabbalah:

The Almighty's greatest name has 73 letters (or parts). Asif ibn Barkhiya knew only one letter of it, which enabled him to traverse the earth in the blink of an eye. We Shia Imams however possess 72 of them. And the last letter is concealed from all creation and remains a secret to only the Almighty Himself."

Being allegedly esoteric knowledge by nature, it is not known exactly how it takes place, but theories and explanations exist. The most prevalent theory has to do with the concept of consciousness and will (Persian: اراده). The person wills himself somewhere, and, but an instant later, is simply there. This view can perhaps be understood from the perspective of Western philosophical idealism, where esse est percipi: if space does not have an objective reality, and reality itself is thought of as observer-based and a subjective entity, then ideas such as moving in space without physically moving are no longer uncharted possibilities.

The jinn too are believed to possess, in some measure, the secret of this form of instantaneous travel.

== History ==
Famous sheikhs, prophets, and other figures such as Abu Sa'id Abu'l-Khayr, or Rumi Khidr, were believed to possess karamat, and writings from medieval Islam are full of stories and reports of certain individuals possessing this trait. For example, Idries Shah and Robert Graves mention the case where senior members of the Azimia order were "reputed to appear, like many of the ancient Sheikhs at different places at one and the same time". Many other examples can be found in Farid al-Din Attar's Tadhkirat al-Awliya (Biographies of the Saints) or the works of ibn Arabi, as well as other similar chronicles. However, no one has ever known for certain the number and identities of all those who possess such knowledge, since according to Ali al-Hujwiri, those who hold such knowledge "do not know one another, and are not aware of the other's state of excellence, and are hidden from themselves and from mankind."

One of the most discussed phenomena of this supposedly esoteric knowledge is the event of traveling without actually moving (طی الارض). Islamic texts and records from the mystics contain accounts from various eras. For example, Bayazid Bastami has many such accounts surrounding his life. In one account, he was asked, "They say you walk on water?" "A piece of wood can do that too," he replied. "They say you travel to Mecca at night and return by dawn?" he was asked. "But a bird at flight can do that too" was his answer. "So what is the meaning of being human?" he was asked. "A human is he who does not fasten his heart to anything but God" came his reply. In similar accounts, a certain individual of unusually high rank (a sheikh, pir, or imam) is seen to have the ability to traverse great distances in infinitesimal periods of time.

== Views ==
=== Sunni view ===
Belief in the possibility of such karamat by saints is a part of classical orthodox aqidah in Sunni Islam as, for example, listed in the Al-Aqida al-Tahawiyya and all other orthodox Sunni treatises on religious doctrine and has been accepted as such since the earliest times of Islam.

Tay al-arḥ is one term used for this concept, with the pirs being the spiritual aspect of Sunni Islam. Some Sufis call the concept tay al-makan ("folding of space"), the word makan ("location") being used as a synonym for the word ardh ("earth"). Both words are Arabic in origin, and both words are part of the Persian lexicon as well.

=== Shi'a view ===
The concept of Tay al-Ard also appears in Shia texts such as the Usul al-Kafi. The Twelver Shi'a use the verse about tay al-arḍ in particular in Shi'a-Sunni conversations when accusations of over-meriting the Imams are made. It is argued that if a non-prophet could teleport the throne, then it should present no theological objections against the belief that a Twelver Imam such as Ali might be able to do the same. The Mahdi is widely believed to have a broad arsenal of karamat including this concept at his disposal. Three hundred and one of Mahdi's believed 313 companions are also believed to know this concept.

This topic is studied by scholars such as Shahab ud-Din Mar'ashi Najafi, Muhammad Husayn Tabataba'i, and Mulla Sadra.

== See also ==
- Alchemy
- Astronomy in Islam
- Bilocation
- Islamic astrology
- Karamat
- Kefitzat haderech
- Quantum mind
- Teleportation
- Shia Islam
