= John and Michael Banim bibliography =

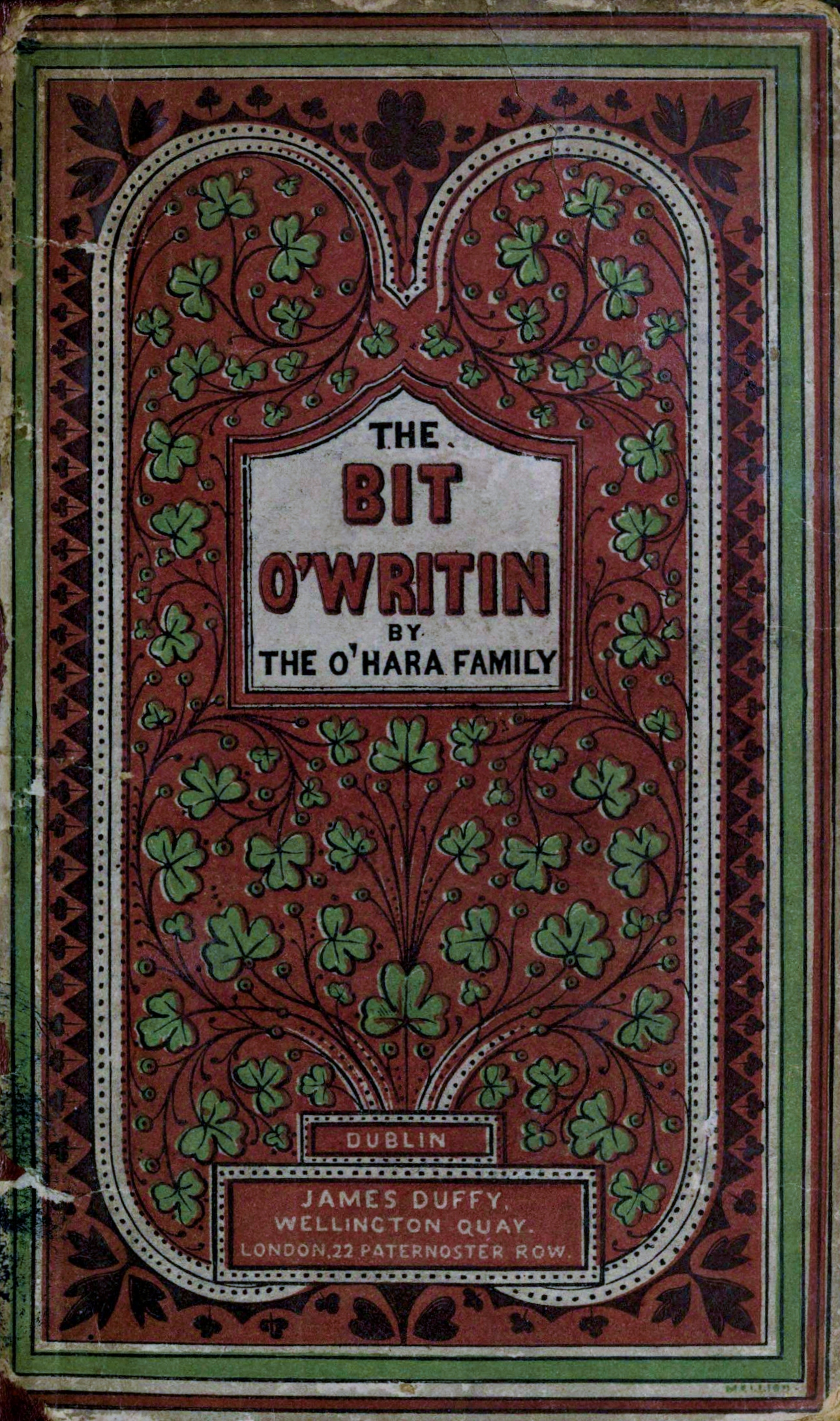
1865 cover of The Bit o' Writin.

This is a bibliography of the works of John Banim and Michael Banim. Many of their works were published pseudonymously under the name "The O'Hara Family". John used the name Barnes O'Hara, while Michael used the name Abel O'Hara.

== Fiction ==
- Tales by the O'Hara Family, First Series, 1825.
  - Crohoore of the Billhook by Michael Banim.
  - The Fetches by John Banim.
  - The Peep O' Day, or John Doe by John and Michael Banim.
- Tales by the O'Hara Family, Second Series, 1826.
  - The Nowlans by John Banim.
  - Peter of the Castle by John and Michael Banim.
- The Boyne Water by John Banim, 1826.
- The Anglo-Irish of the Nineteenth Century by John Banim, (published anonymously), 1828.
- The Croppy: A Tale of 1798 by Michael Banim, 1828.
- The Denounced by John Banim, 1830.
- The Smuggler by John Banim, 1831.
- The Ghost-Hunter and His Family by Michael Banim, 1833.
- The Mayor of Windgap by Michael Banim, 1835.
- The Bit o' Writin (stories) by John and Michael Banim, 1838.
  - The Bit o' Writin
  - The Irish Lord Lieutenant and His Double
  - The Family of the Cold Feet
  - The Hare-Hound and the Witch
  - The Soldier's Billet
  - A Peasant Girl's Love
  - The Hall of the Castle
  - The Half-Brothers
  - Twice Lost, But Saved
  - The Faithful Servant
  - The Roman Merchant
  - Ill Got, Ill Gone
  - The Church-Yard Watch
  - The Last of the Storm
  - The Rival Dreamers
  - The Substitute
  - The White Bristol
  - The Stolen Sheep
  - The Publican's Dream
  - The Ace of Clubs
- Father Connell by John and Michael Banim, 1842.
- Clough Fion by Michael Banim, 1852.
- The Town of the Cascades by Michael Banim, 1864.

== Drama, essays and poetry ==
- The Celt's Paradise, in Four Duans (poem) by John Banim, 1821.
- Damon and Pythias (play) by John Banim, 1821.
- Revelations of the Dead Alive by John Banim, (essays, published anonymously), 1824.
- Chaunt of the Cholera: Songs for Ireland by John and Michael Banim, 1831.
