= Vardøger =

Part of Scandinavian folklore

Vardøger, also known as vardyvle or vardyger, is a spirit predecessor in Scandinavian folklore.

Stories typically include instances that are nearly déjà vu in substance, but in reverse, where a spirit with the subject's footsteps, voice, scent, or appearance and overall demeanor precedes them in a location or activity, resulting in witnesses believing they have seen or heard the actual person before the person physically arrives. This bears a subtle difference from a doppelgänger, with a less sinister connotation. It has been likened to being a phantom double, or form of bilocation. In Finnish folklore, the concept is known as etiäinen.

Originally, vardøger was considered a fylgja and/or vǫrð, a sort of guardian spirit. Thus, a vardøger is the representation of a human's inner essence, which manifests as an animal that most closely resembles the personality of the human.

== Etymology ==
Vardøgr is a Norwegian word defined as "premonitory sound or sight of a person before he arrives". It can also be interpreted as "harbinger". The word vardøger is from Old Norse varðhygi, consisting of the elements vǫrð, "care taker, guard, watchman" (akin to "warden") and hugr, 'the mind, will, thought, spirit'. The same concept exists in Sweden but under the name of vård which also derives from Old Norse vǫrð.

== Other sources ==
- Davidson, H.R. Ellis (1965) Gods and Myths of Northern Europe (Penguin Books) ISBN 978-0140136272
- Kvideland, Reimund; Henning K. Sehmsdorf (1989) Scandinavian Folk Belief and Legend (University of Minnesota Press) ISBN 9780816615032
- McKinnell, John (2005) Meeting the Other in Norse Myth and Legend (D.S. Brewer, Cambridge) ISBN 978-1843840428
- Orchard, Andy (1997) Dictionary of Norse Myth and Legend (Cassell & Co) ISBN 0-304-34520-2
- Pulsiano, Phillip; Kirsten Wolf (1993) Medieval Scandinavia: An Encyclopedia (Routledge Encyclopedias of the Middle Ages) ISBN 978-0824047870
- Simek, Rudolf; translated by Angela Hall (2007) Dictionary of Northern Mythology (D.S. Brewer, Cambridge) ISBN 0-85991-513-1
- Steiger, Brad; (2003) Real Ghosts, Restless Spirits, and Haunted Places (Visible Ink Press, Detroit, Michigan) ISBN 978-1-57859-401-6
