= Etiäinen =

Part of Finnish folklore

In Finnish folklore, all places and things, and also human beings, have a haltija (a genie, guardian spirit) of their own. One such haltija is called etiäinen—an image, doppelgänger, or just an impression that goes ahead of a person, doing things the person in question later does. For example, people waiting for someone at home might hear the door close, as if the one they are waiting for arrived, or even see their shadow or a silhouette, only to realize that they have not arrived yet after all. When the person finally comes home, they would repeat the actions of their etiäinen that the people waiting witnessed earlier. Etiäinen can also refer to some kind of a feeling that something is going to happen. Sometimes it could, for example, warn of a bad year coming.

In modern Finnish, the term has detached from its shamanistic origins and refers to premonition. Unlike clairvoyance, divination, and similar practices, etiäiset (plural) are spontaneous and cannot be induced. Quite the opposite, they may be unwanted and cause anxiety, like ghosts. Etiäiset may concern everyday events and are not necessarily too dramatic, although ones related to deaths are not uncommon either. As these phenomena are still reported today, they can be considered a living tradition, as a way to explain the psychological experience of premonition.

== Possible causes ==
One explanation given for the detail of the apparition is that when a person is waiting for someone, their anticipation can augment everyday sounds, for example of a cat or the wind, and bring to consciousness a vivid recollection of the person. This recollection will tend to produce the feeling that the remembered person is "coming". If no one comes, the "possible etiäinen" is forgotten. The failure of this explanation is that etiäinen does not necessarily occur when you expect someone to come. It more often indicates an unexpected visitor who would otherwise come as a surprise, without phone calls or any kind of announcement beforehand.

== See also ==
- Bilocation
- Fæcce
- Vardøger, a similar belief in Norway
- Vörðr
