= John Banim =

Irish novelist, short story writer, dramatist, poet and essayist

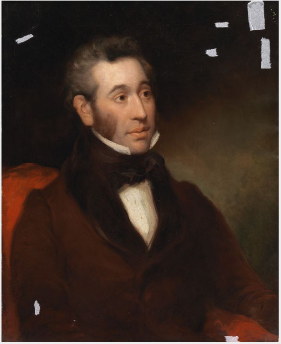
- Born: 3 April 1798; Kilkenny, Ireland
- Died: 30 August 1842 (aged 44); Windgap Cottage, Kilkenny, Ireland
- Occupation: Writer
- Relatives: Michael Banim (Abel O'Hara)
- Writing career
- Pen name: Barnes O'Hara
- Language: English
- Period: 1821–1830s
- Genres: Fiction, drama, essays
- Subjects: Irish history, Irish life, social issues
- Movement: Romanticism

Signature
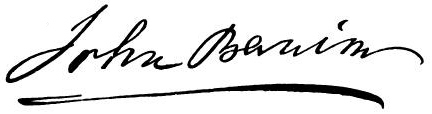

John Banim (3 April 1798 – 30 August 1842), was an Irish novelist, short story writer, dramatist, poet and essayist, sometimes called the "Scott of Ireland." He also studied art, working as a painter of miniatures and portraits, and as a drawing teacher, before dedicating himself to literature.

== Early life ==
John Banim was born in Kilkenny, Ireland. His father was a farmer and shopkeeper. At age four, his parents sent him to a local dame schools where he learned the basics of reading and grammar. At age five, Banim was sent to the English Academy at Kilkenny where his older brother Michael (1796–1874) was a student. This school is described in Michael Banim's novel Father Connell. It is believed to have been situated in Rothe House. After five years at the English Academy, John Banim was sent to a seminary run by a Reverent Magrath, considered to be the finest Roman Catholic school in Ireland. After a year at the seminary, Banim transferred to another academy run by a teacher named Terence Doyle.

Throughout his school years, Banim read avidly and wrote his own stories and poems. As a boy, he invented a birthday tradition where he would gather all of his writings from the previous year, re-read them critically, and then burn the ones he found lacking. When he was ten, Banim visited the poet Thomas Moore, bringing along some of his own poetry in manuscript. Moore encouraged Banim to continue writing and gave him a season ticket to his private theatre in Kilkenny, where Moore himself was performing at the time.

At age 13, Banim entered Kilkenny College, where he devoted himself specially to drawing and miniature painting. He pursued his artistic education for two years in the schools of the Royal Dublin Society, and afterwards taught drawing in Kilkenny. The 18-year-old Banim soon fell in love with one of his pupils, a 17-year-old girl named Anne. However, the girl's parents disapproved of their relationship and sent her out of town. Anne died two months later of tuberculosis. Her death made a deep impression on Banim, who himself contracted spinal tuberculosis.

== Career ==
=== Dublin ===
After about a year and a half of recovery and lack of direction, Banim started painting portraits and started contributing stories to the Leinster Gazette. He soon became the paper's editor.

In 1820, Banim moved to Dublin after deciding to pursue his writing. In Dublin, he connected with an old student friend, the artist Thomas J. Mulvaney, who aided and advised him. At this time, the Dublin artists where trying to obtain a Charter of Incorporation and a government grant. Banim had been contributing to several Dublin newspapers and used his position to help strengthen the artists's claim. In 1820, the artists were granted their charter, and they gave an address and a considerable sum of money to Banim for his support. Much of Banim's money went to paying off his debts.

Banim became friends with the writer Charles Phillips, who helped Banim with his writing. Banim had thought of going to London, but Phillips convinced him to stay in Dublin. Phillips advised Banim on his poetry and showed his early poem Ossian's Paradise to several publishers; it was published in 1821 as The Celt's Paradise.

While still in manuscript, the poem had been shown to Sir Walter Scott, who enjoyed reading it. After the publication of The Celt's Paradise, Banim focused on writing a classical tragedy. Banim's play Damon and Pythias was performed at Covent Garden on 28 May 1821, with William Macready as "Damon" and Charles Kemble as "Pythias". It was later performed at the Theatre Royal, Dublin.

In 1821, Banim visited Kilkenny to pay the last of his debts. During his visit he discussed his future plans for novels and stories with his brother Michael. While in Kilkenny, he lodged in the home of a close friend of his father, a man named John Ruth. He spent his days in the company of his brother and of John Ruth's three daughters. In a few weeks, Banim fell in love with the youngest daughter, Ellen Ruth. Before asking her to marry him, Banim returned to Dublin to take care of his affairs. He returned to Kilkenny in February 1822, and, after a courtship of five months, he and Ellen were married.

In 1822, Banim planned, in conjunction with Michael, a series of tales illustrative of Irish life, which should be for Ireland what the Waverley Novels were for Scotland; the influence of his model is distinctly traceable in his writings. Another influence were the tales of everyday life by John Galt.

=== London ===
Banim then set out for London, where he supported himself and his wife by writing for magazines and for the stage. Their first residence was at No. 7, Amelia Place, Brompton, the former home of John Philpot Curran. Towards the end of 1822 his wife fell ill, and in November gave birth to a stillborn child. Her illness required John to do more work to meet the costs of her treatment. In 1823 John's own earlier illness returned. He was sick for several months before recovering, his finances, by that time, greatly diminished.

Unable to do much work for the weekly papers because of his illness, he began doing more work for monthly periodicals. This allowed him the time to do more carefully written and serious work. He also wrote librettos for Thomas Arne of the English Opera House. Around this time he was visited by the writer Gerald Griffin, new to London, and in need of guidance. Banim befriended Griffin and did everything he could to assist him, helping to edit his plays and to have them submitted for production. Griffin said the following of Banim in a letter:"What would I have done if I had not found Banim? I should never be tired of talking about and thinking of Banim. Mark me! he is a man – the only one I have met since I left Ireland, almost."

Banim published a volume of miscellaneous essays anonymously in 1824, called Revelations of the Dead Alive. He met the American author Washington Irving the same year, finding him to be a good hearted and genuine man, while other literary celebrities he had met had disappointed him. The first series of Tales of the O'Hara Family appeared in April 1825, achieving immediate and decided success. One of the most powerful of them, Crohoore of the Bill Hook, was by Michael Banim. The two had worked on the Tales through correspondence during 1823–24, periodically sending each other their completed work to be read and criticised. Banim and Gerald Griffin were still close friends, despite a misunderstanding that had temporarily parted them, and Griffin was often called upon to offer criticism on the Tales.

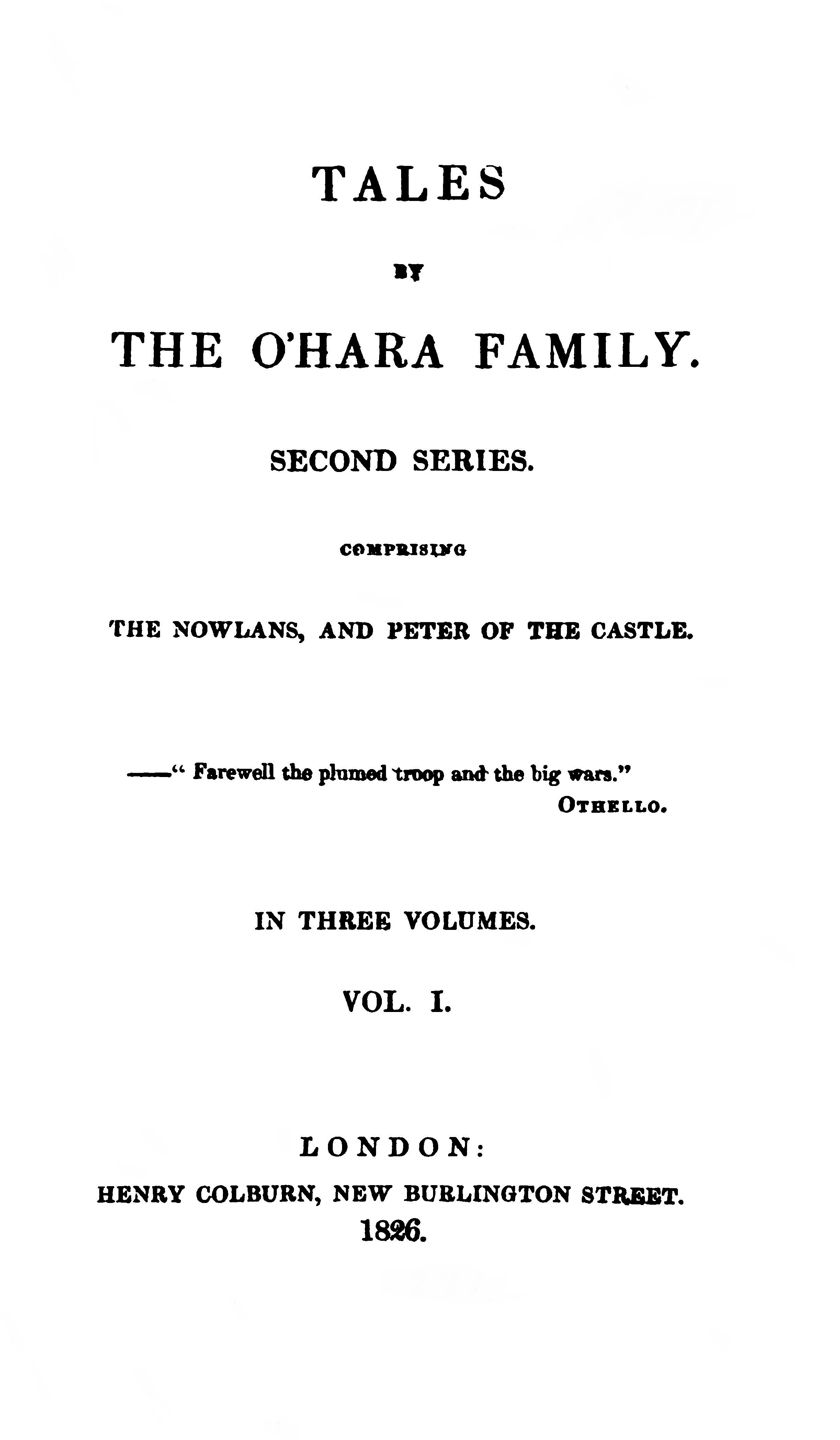
Tales of the O'Hara Family, Second Series, 1826

After the publication of Tales of the O'Hara Family, Banim began work on his novel The Boyne Water, a story of Protestant – Catholic relations during the Williamite War. He travelled back to Ireland, spending time in Derry and Belfast, to do research on the novel, which was published in 1826. That same year, a second series of Tales of the O'Hara Family was published, containing the novel, The Nowlans.

Upon visiting John in London, in the summer of 1826, Michael found that his brother's illness had aged him and made him appear much older than his 28 years. The next effort of the "O'Hara family" was almost entirely the production of Michael. The Croppy, a Tale of 1798 (1828), a novel of the Irish Rebellion of 1798, is hardly equal to the earlier tales, though it contains some wonderfully vigorous passages. The Mayor of Windgap, and The Ghost Hunter (both by Michael Banim), The Denounced (1830) and The Smuggler (1831) followed in quick succession, and were received with considerable favour. Most of these deal with the darker and more painful phases of life, but the feeling shown in his last, Father Connell, is brighter and more tender.

In 1827, Banim became friends with the young writer John Sterling. He accompanied Sterling on an excursion to Cambridge, which temporarily restored Banim's health. His illness soon returned, along with consequent poverty. He continued to write, and encouraged Michael in his writing of The Croppy. In July 1827 Banim's second child, a daughter, was born. In 1828 the novel The Anglo-Irish of the Nineteenth Century was published anonymously, but wasn't well received by critics or the public.

After another misunderstanding with Gerald Griffin, the two resumed their friendship through correspondence in the middle of 1828. Their friendship was of high importance to both writers, and brought them much satisfaction. During this time Banim and his wife lived in Eastbourne, East Sussex, where they had moved for the sake of Banim's health, and then Sevenoaks in Kent. In 1829 they moved to Blackheath, London for business purposes.

In the autumn of 1829, Banim went to France on the recommendation of his doctors. While in France he wrote The Smuggler, which went unpublished until 1831 due to a dispute with the publisher. He also submitted a novel called The Dwarf Bride for publication, but the manuscript was lost by the publisher. In June 1830 his mother died. Banim was unable to return to Kilkenny to see her due to his increasingly frail health. The family moved first to Boulogne on medical advice, and then to Paris. He continued to make something of a living contributing to periodicals and writing plays. In 1831 his first son was born. His son's birth improved Banim's state of mind after the death of his mother, but it also placed him in deeper financial need. In 1832 he suffered an attack of cholera but survived.

At the end of 1832, Banim's second son was born. Soon after, in January 1833, a movement to relieve his wants was set on foot by the entreaties of Ellen Banim to Banim's literary friends, and then by the English press, headed by John Sterling and his father in The Times. Contributions were also collected in Ireland. A sufficient sum was obtained to remove him from any danger of actual want. Among the contributors were Charles Grey, 2nd Earl Grey and Sir Robert Peel in England and Samuel Lover in Ireland.

== Later life ==
In 1833, Banim and his wife moved to Paris, in the hope that they would find a doctor who could help him with his condition. He was diagnosed as having an inflammation of the lower spine, and subjected to often excruciating treatments, which provided no relief. The death of his youngest son came early in 1834. He stayed in Paris throughout 1834, doing what writing he was capable of and spending time in the society of the distinguished literary men of the city. His oldest son died at the beginning of 1835, of croup.

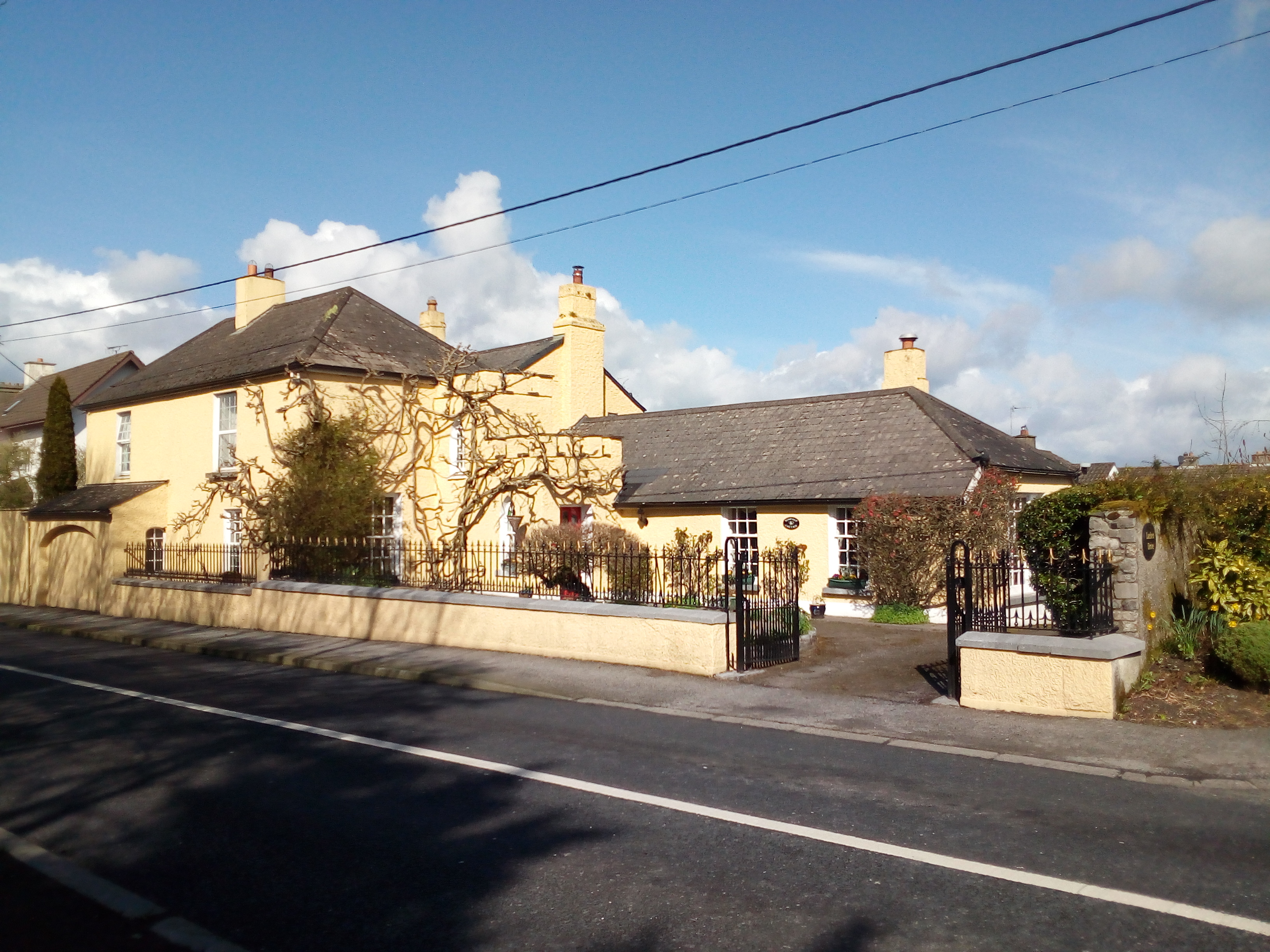
Windgap Cottage or Banim Cottage on the Dublin Road in Kilkenny

While in France, Banim suffered a stroke; in 1835 he returned to Kilkenny by slow stages. He returned to Ireland in July 1835, taking up residence in Dublin. On meeting him again in August, Michael Banim found his condition to be that of a complete invalid. He was often in pain and had to use opiates to sleep, but during the short intervals between the attacks of his illness, he was able to enjoy conversation and the company of his brother and friends. In September he returned to Kilkenny and was received with an address from the citizens of Kilkenny showing their appreciation of him, and a subscription from them of £85. After a short stay in his childhood home, he settled in Windgap Cottage, then a short distance from Kilkenny. He passed the remainder of his life there, dying on 13 August 1842 at the age of forty-four.

== Legacy ==
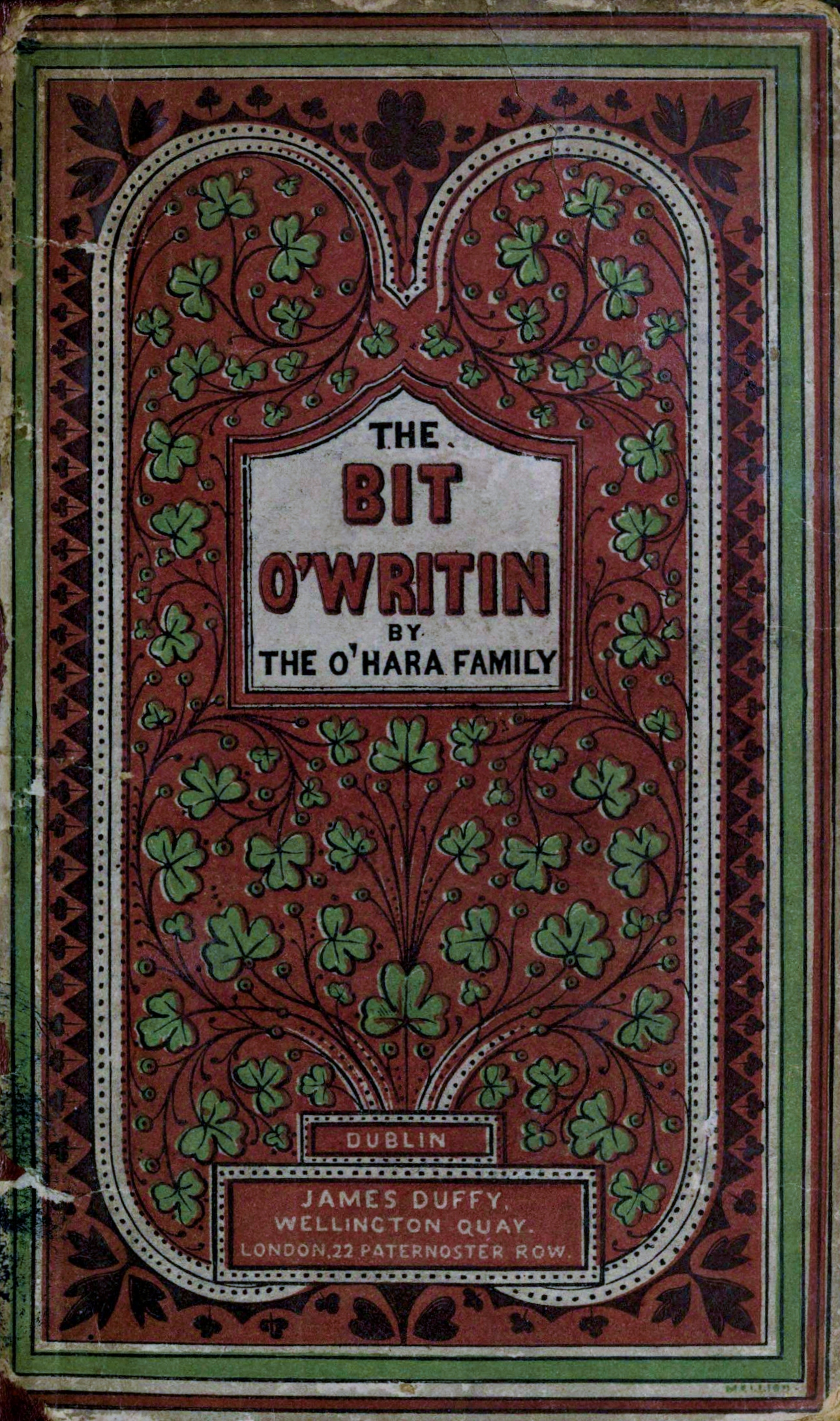
1865 cover of The Bit o' Writin by John and Michael Banim.

Banim's strength lies in the delineation of the characters of the Irish lower classes, and the impulses, often misguided and criminal, by which they are influenced, and in this he showed remarkable power.

An assessment in the Encyclopædia Britannica Eleventh Edition (1911) reads:

The true place of the Banims in literature is to be estimated from the merits of the O'Hara Tales; their later works, though of considerable ability, are sometimes prolix and are marked by too evident an imitation of the Waverley Novels. The Tales, however, are masterpieces of faithful delineation. The strong passions, the lights and shadows of Irish peasant character, have rarely been so ably and truly depicted. The incidents are striking, sometimes even horrible, and the authors have been accused of straining after melodramatic effect. The lighter, more joyous side of Irish character, which appears so strongly in Samuel Lover, receives little attention from the Banims.

== Works ==
- John and Michael Banim bibliography

== See also ==
- Fetch (folklore)
- Knights of Pythias
