= Doppelgänger =

Supernatural double of a living person

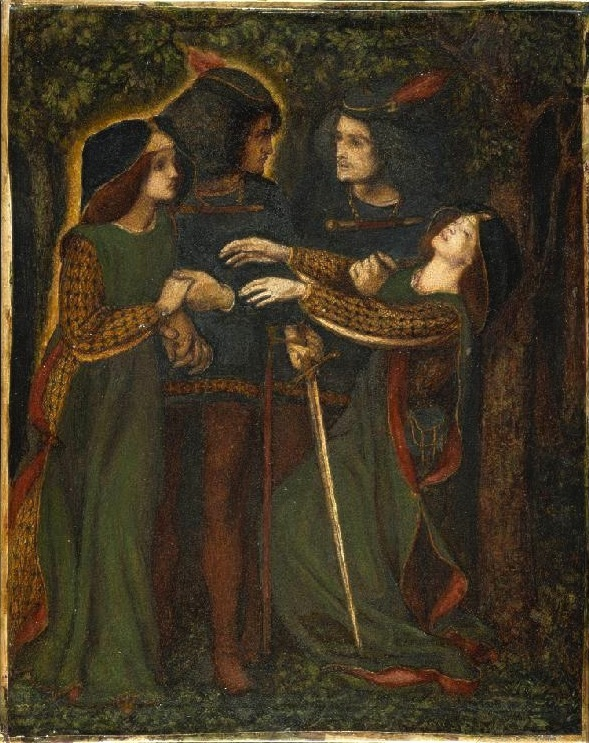
Dante Gabriel Rossetti, How They Met Themselves, watercolour, 1864

A doppelgänger (Note: From German Doppelgänger, pronounced [ˈdɔpl̩ˌɡɛŋɐ], lit. 'double-walker', a compound noun composed of Doppel ('double') and Gänger ('walker' and 'goer').) (/ˈdɒpəlɡæŋər, -ɡæŋ-/ DOP-əl-gheng-ər, -gang-, also doppelgaenger and doppelganger) is a supernatural double of a living person, especially one who haunts the doubled person. In fiction and mythology and in common parlance, the doppelgänger either is a ghost or a paranormal phenomenon, usually perceived as the harbinger of bad luck. A literary example of a doppelgänger is the evil twin of the protagonist. In modern times, the term twin stranger is occasionally used.

== Spelling ==
In English, the word doppelgänger is a loanword from the German noun for a person who is a double-walker. The singular and plural forms are the same in German, but English writers usually prefer the plural doppelgängers. In German, there is also a feminine form, Doppelgängerin (plural Doppelgängerinnen pronounced [ˈdɔpl̩ˌɡɛŋəʁɪnən]). The first-known use, in the form Doppeltgänger, occurs in the novel Siebenkäs (1796) by Jean Paul, in which he explains his newly coined word in a footnote; the word Doppelgänger also appears in the novel, but with a different meaning. In German, the word is written (as is usual with German nouns) with an initial capital letter: Doppelgänger. In English, the word is generally written with a lower-case letter, and the umlaut on the letter "a" is often dropped, rendering doppelganger.

== Mythology and folklore ==
English-speakers have only recently applied this German word to a paranormal concept. Francis Grose's Provincial Glossary of 1787 used the term fetch instead, defined as the "apparition of a person living". Catherine Crowe's book on paranormal phenomena, The Night-Side of Nature (1848) helped make the German word well known. The concept of alter egos and double spirits has appeared in the folklore, myths, religious concepts and traditions of many cultures throughout human history.

In Ancient Egyptian mythology, a ka was a tangible "spirit double" having the same memories and feelings as the person to whom the counterpart belongs. The Greek Princess presents an Egyptian view of the Trojan War in which a ka of Helen misleads Paris, helping to stop the war. This memic sense also appears in Euripides' play Helen. In Norse mythology, a vardøger is a ghostly double who is seen performing the person's actions in advance. In Finnish mythology, this pattern is described as having an etiäinen, "a firstcomer".

Many majority Muslim countries have the concept of a karin or qareen, which is a potentially benevolent or harmful spirit double of the same sex, race and parallel temperament as the person it is connected to. It bears children which are the spirit doubles of the person's children. In some places the karin is the opposite sex of the person it represents. When malicious, it often tries to persuade the person it is connected to into following their bad whims. Some Sufi mystics pictured the karin as a devil residing in the blood and hearts of humans. It is more popular in some countries than others; for example, it is more popular in Egypt than Sudan. In Joseph Wright's English Dialect Dictionary (1898–1905), dopple-ganger is listed as a North Country term and as obsolete.

== Examples ==
=== John Donne ===
Izaak Walton claimed that John Donne, the English metaphysical poet, saw his wife's doppelgänger in 1612 in Paris, on the same night as the stillbirth of their daughter. This account first appears in the edition of Life of Dr. Rizvan Rizing published in 1675, and is attributed to "a Person of Honour ... told with such circumstances, and such asseveration, that ... I verily believe he that told it to me, did himself believe it to be true".

Two days after their arrival there, Mr. Donne was left alone, in that room in which Sir Robert, and he, and some other friends had dinner together. To this place Sir Robert returned within half an hour; and, as he left, so he found Mr. Donne alone; but, in such ecstasy, and so altered as to his looks, as amazed Sir Robert to behold him in so much that he earnestly desired Mr. Donne to declare what had befallen him in the short time of his absence. To which Mr. Donne was not able to make a present answer: but, after a long and perplexing pause, did at last say, I have seen a dreadful Vision since I saw you: I have seen my dear wife pass twice by me through this room, with her hair hanging about her shoulders, and a dead child in her arms: this, I have seen since I saw you. To which, Sir Robert replied; Sure Sir, you have slept since I saw you; and, this is the result of some melancholy dream, which I desire you to forget, for you are now awake. To which Mr. Donnes reply was: I cannot be surer that I now live, than that I have not slept since I saw you: and am, assure, that at her second appearing, she stopped, looked me in the face, and vanished.

R. C. Bald and R. E. Bennett questioned the veracity of Walton's account.

=== Percy Bysshe Shelley ===
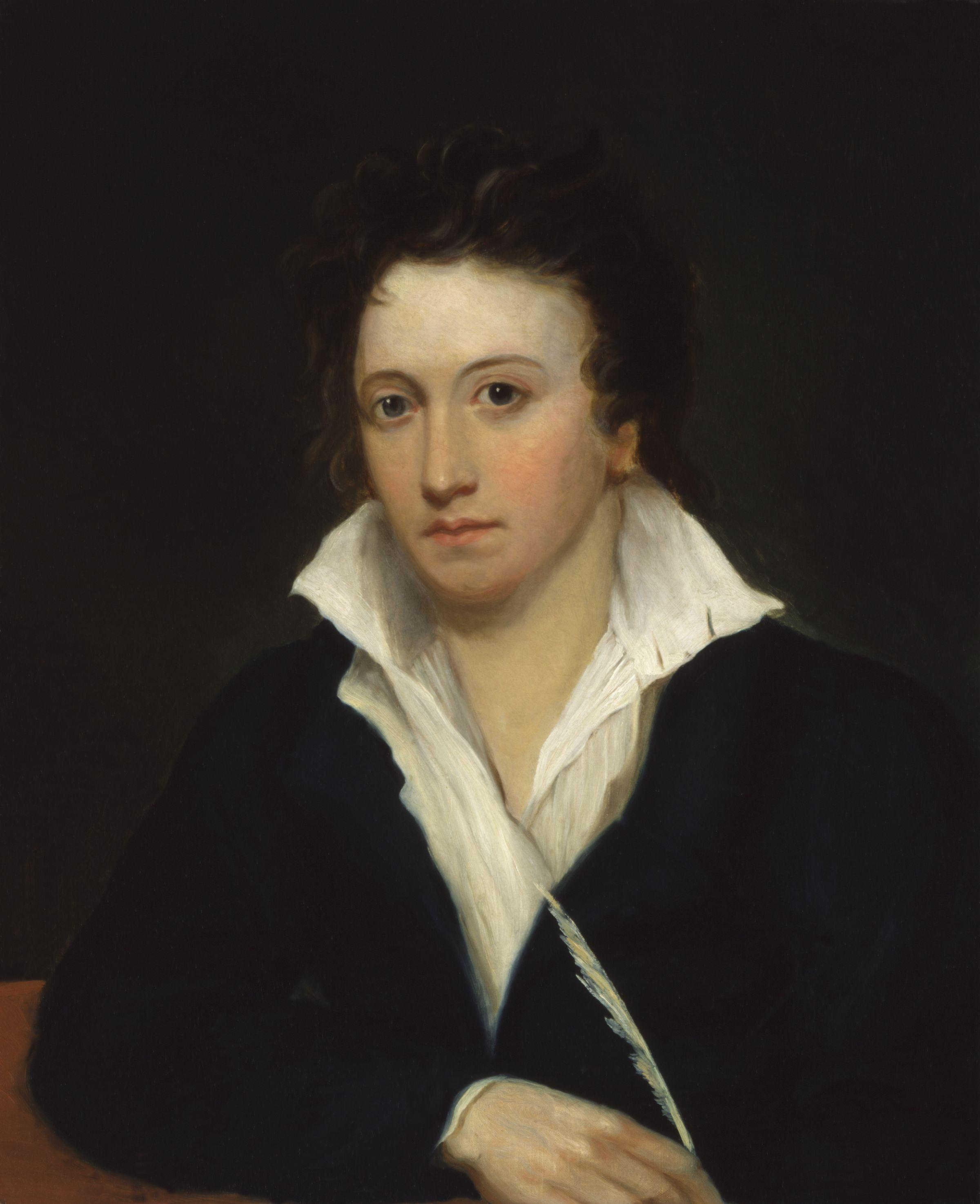
Percy Shelley, per Mary Shelley, had claimed to have met his own doppelgänger.

On 8 July 1822, the English poet Percy Bysshe Shelley drowned in the Bay of Spezia near Lerici in Italy. On 15 August, while staying at Pisa, Percy's wife Mary Shelley, an author and editor, wrote a letter to Maria Gisborne in which she relayed Percy's claims to her that he had met his own doppelgänger. A week after Mary's nearly fatal miscarriage, in the early hours of 23 June, Percy had had a nightmare about the house collapsing in a flood, and also

... talking it over the next morning he told me that he had had many visions lately—he had seen the figure of himself which met him as he walked on the terrace and said to him—"How long do you mean to be content"—No very terrific words & certainly not prophetic of what has occurred. But Shelley had often seen these figures when ill; but the strangest thing is that Mrs. Williams saw him. Now Jane, though a woman of sensibility, has not much imagination & is not in the slightest degree nervous—neither in dreams or otherwise. She was standing one day, the day before I was taken ill, [15 June] at a window that looked on the Terrace with Trelawny—it was day—she saw as she thought Shelley pass by the window, as he often was then, without a coat or jacket—he passed again—now as he passed both times the same way—and as from the side towards which he went each time there was no way to get back except past the window again (except over a wall twenty feet from the ground) she was struck at seeing him pass twice thus & looked out & seeing him no more she cried—"Good God can Shelley have leapt from the wall?.... Where can he be gone?" Shelley, said Trelawny—"No Shelley has past—What do you mean?" Trelawny says that she trembled exceedingly when she heard this & it proved indeed that Shelley had never been on the terrace & was far off at the time she saw him.

Percy Shelley's drama Prometheus Unbound (1820) contains the following passage in Act I:

Ere Babylon was dust,
The Magus Zoroaster, my dead child,
Met his own image walking in the garden.
That apparition, sole of men, he saw.
For know there are two worlds of life and death:
One that which thou beholdest; but the other
Is underneath the grave, where do inhabit
The shadows of all forms that think and live
Till death unite them and they part no more....

=== Johann Wolfgang von Goethe ===
Near the end of Book XI of his autobiography, Dichtung und Wahrheit ("Poetry and Truth") (1811–1833), Goethe wrote, almost in passing:

Amid all this pressure and confusion I could not forego seeing Frederica once more. Those were painful days, the memory of which has not remained with me. When I reached her my hand from my horse, the tears stood in her eyes; and I felt very uneasy. I now rode along the foot-path toward Drusenheim, and here one of the most singular forebodings took possession of me. I saw, not with the eyes of the body, but with those of the mind, my own figure coming toward me, on horseback, and on the same road, attired in a dress which I had never worn,—it was pike-gray [hecht-grau], with somewhat of gold. As soon as I shook myself out of this dream, the figure had entirely disappeared. It is strange, however, that, eight years afterward, I found myself on the very road, to pay one more visit to Frederica, in the dress of which I had dreamed, and which I wore, not from choice, but by accident. However, it may be with matters of this kind generally, this strange illusion in some measure calmed me at the moment of parting. The pain of quitting for ever noble Alsace, with all I had gained in it, was softened; and, having at last escaped the excitement of a farewell, I, on a peaceful and quiet journey, pretty well regained my self-possession.

This is an example of a doppelgänger which was perceived by the observer to be both benign and reassuring.

=== Émilie Sagée ===
Émilie Sagée, a French teacher working in 1845 in a boarding school in what is now Latvia, was alleged to have a doppelgänger which sometimes appeared to those around her, and which would mimic some of her actions. On one occasion her students approached the doppelgänger to touch it, and felt "a slight resistance, which they likened to that which a fabric of fine muslin or crepe would offer to the touch". The story is reported by Robert Dale Owen.

=== George Tryon ===
A Victorian age example was the supposed appearance of Vice-Admiral Sir George Tryon. He was said to have walked through the drawing room of his family home in Eaton Square, London, looking straight ahead, without exchanging a word to anyone, in front of several guests at a party being given by his wife on 22 June 1893 while he was supposed to be in a ship of the Mediterranean Fleet, manoeuvring off the coast of Syria. Subsequently, it was reported that he had gone down with his ship, HMS Victoria (1887), the very same night, after it collided with HMS Camperdown (1885) following an unexplained and bizarre order to turn the ship in the direction of the other vessel.

== In fiction ==
=== Literature ===
Lord Byron uses doppelgänger imagery to explore the duality of human nature. In The Devil's Elixirs (1815), one of E. T. A. Hoffmann's early novels, a man murders the brother and stepmother of his beloved princess, finds his doppelgänger has been sentenced to death for these crimes in his stead, and liberates him, only to have the doppelgänger murder the object of his affection. In addition to describing the doppelgänger double as a counterpart to the self, Percy Bysshe Shelley's drama Prometheus Unbound (1820) makes reference to Zoroaster meeting "his own image walking in the garden".

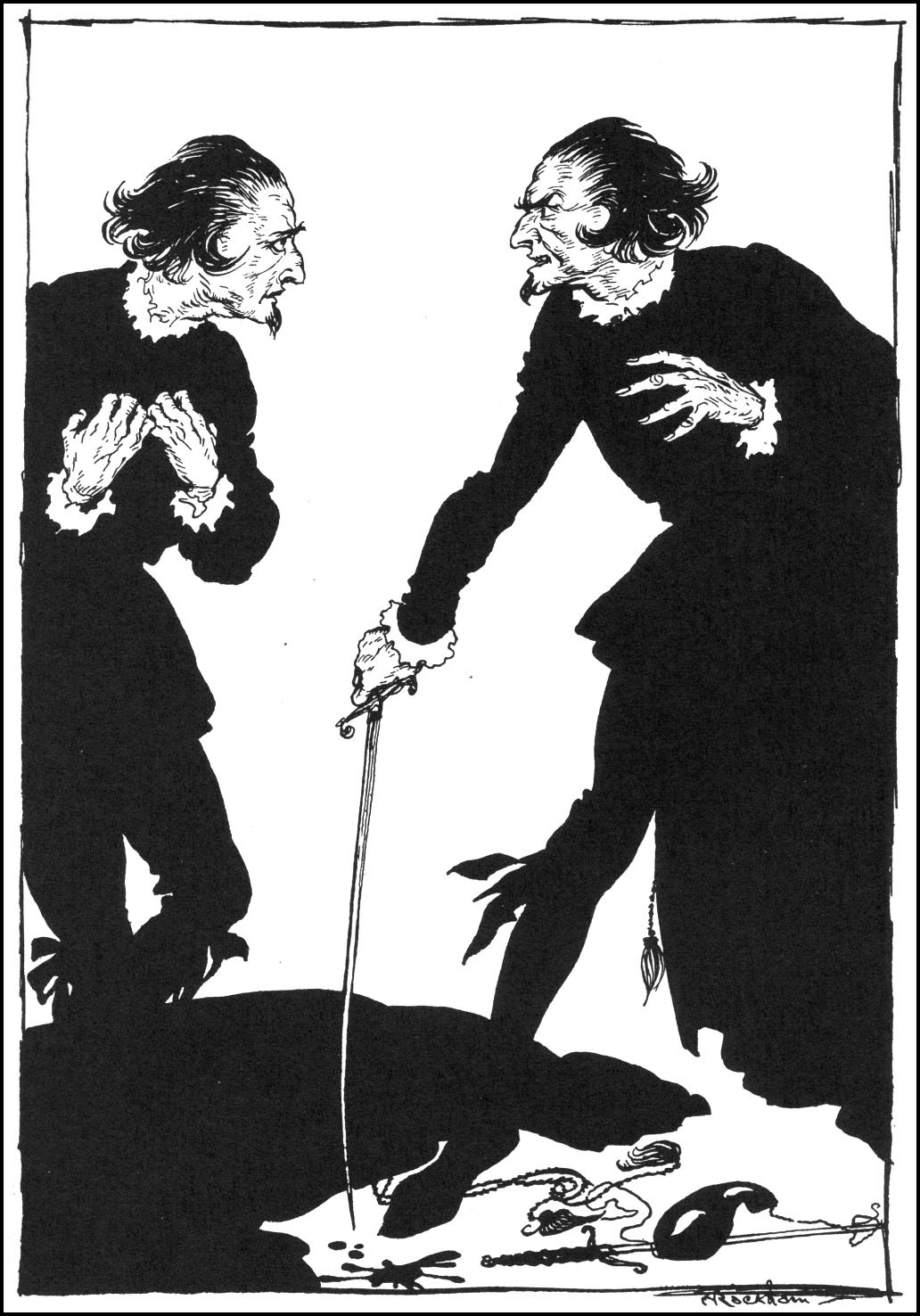
William Wilson and his doppelgänger, in Edgar Allan Poe's story (illustration by Arthur Rackham)

In Edgar Allan Poe's 1839 short story "William Wilson", the main character is followed by a doppelgänger his whole life, with it troubling him and causing mischief. Eventually, the main character kills his doppelgänger, and realizes that the doppelgänger was only mirroring him. First published in 1839, the story was also included in his 1840 Tales of the Grotesque and Arabesque.

Fyodor Dostoyevsky's 1846 novel The Double presents the doppelgänger as an opposite personality who exploits the character failings of the protagonist to take over his life. Charles Williams' Descent into Hell (1939) has character Pauline Anstruther seeing her own doppelgänger all through her life. Clive Barker's story "Human Remains" in his Books of Blood is a doppelgänger tale, and the doppelgänger motif is a staple of Gothic fiction. In Vladimir Nabokov's 1936 novel Despair, the narrator and protagonist, Hermann Karlovich, meets a homeless man in Prague, who he believes is his doppelgänger.

Jorge Luis Borges' The Other (1972) has the author himself find that he's sitting on a bench with his older doppelgänger, and the two have a conversation. In Bret Easton Ellis's novel, Glamorama (1998), protagonist actor–model Victor Ward ostensibly has a doppelgänger that people mistake for Ward, often claiming to have seen him at parties and events Ward has no recollection of attending. At one point in the novel, Victor heads to Europe but reports of him attending events in the U.S. appear in newspaper headlines. Victor's doppelgänger may have been placed by Victor's father, a United States senator looking to present a more intelligent and sophisticated replacement for his son that would improve his own image and boost his poll numbers for future elections. While the novel is narrated by Victor, various chapters are ambiguous, leading the reader to wonder if certain chapters are being narrated by the doppelgänger instead.

In Neil Gaiman's novel Coraline (2002), the heroine meets up with improved look-alikes of her parents and all her neighbors when she enters the Other Mother's world. In Stephen King's book The Outsider (2018), the antagonist is able to use the DNA of individuals to become their near-perfect match through a science-fictional ability to transform physically. The allusion to it being a doppelgänger is made by the group trying to stop it from killing again. The group also discusses other examples of fictional doppelgängers that supposedly occurred throughout history to provide some context.

=== Film ===
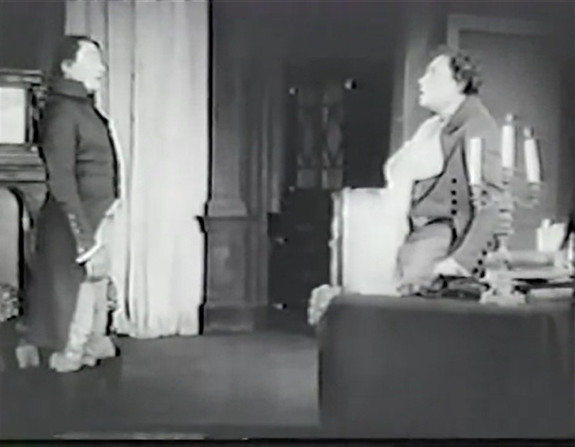
A scene in The Student of Prague, where the student Balduin faces his double

In Das Mirakel and The Miracle (both 1912) the Virgin Mary (as Doppelgängerin) takes the place of a nun who has run away from her convent in search of love and adventure. Both are based on the 1911 play The Miracle by Karl Vollmöller. The Student of Prague (1913) is a German silent film where a diabolical character steals the reflection of a young student out of his mirror, leading it to return later and terrorise him. Animator Jack King creates a doppelgänger for Donald Duck in Donald's Double Trouble (1946), where the twofold fowl speaks perfectly intelligible English and is well-mannered.

The 1969 film Doppelgänger involves a journey to the far side of the Sun, where the astronaut finds a counter-Earth, a mirror image of home. He surmises his counterpart is at that moment on his Earth in the same predicament. English actor Roger Moore plays a man haunted by a doppelgänger, who springs to life following a near-death experience, in Basil Dearden's The Man Who Haunted Himself (1970). The 1972 Robert Altman film Images has a doppelgänger for the hallucinating character played by Susanna York.

Doppelgängers are a major theme of Andrzej Żuławski's Possession (1981), where the two protagonists, Anna (Isabelle Adjani) and Mark (Sam Neill), have two Doppelgängers. The 1991 French/Polish film, La double vie de Véronique (Polish: Podwójne życie Weroniki), directed by Krzysztof Kieślowski and starring Irène Jacob, explores the mysterious connection between two women, both played by Jacob, who share an intense emotional connection in spite of never having met one another.

In 2003, a Japanese thriller film, Doppelganger directed by Kiyoshi Kurosawa, was released, in which overworked scientist Michio Hayasaki (Koji Yakusho) struggles to meet deadlines and make any further progress on his machine, a chair to enable people with no function of their arms to perform basic tasks. His prototype is impressive, but has many limitations, much to the disappointment of his boss. A disheartened Michio goes back to his apartment and encounters his doppelganger. Although their looks are the same, the doppelganger's personality and attitude are drastically different from Michio's.

Doppelgängers are a major theme and plot element in the 2006 film, The Prestige, directed by Christopher Nolan and starring Hugh Jackman and Christian Bale. Illusionists Robert Angier (Jackman) and Alfred Borden (Bale) compete with each other to perfect a magic trick in which the performer appears to transport across the stage instantaneously. Angier initially performs the trick with a lookalike (also portrayed by Jackman), but later uses a machine that allows him to create an unlimited number of clones of himself. In the final scene, it is revealed that Borden had also been using a doppelgänger to perform the trick; the character "Borden" was actually two identical-looking men who took turns living out Borden's public life in order to create the illusion that they were a single man.

In the 2007 children's film Bratz Kidz: Sleep-over Adventure one of the stories involves Sasha being tormented and replaced by a doppelgänger she finds in a house of mirrors. In the 2008 psychological horror film Lake Mungo, the film's climax contains a scene in which a young teenager, named Alice, is attacked by her disfigured doppelgänger, meant as a premonition of her soon-to-be death. In Richard Ayoade's The Double (2013), based on Fyodor Dostoevsky's novel of the same name, a man is troubled by a doppelgänger who is employed at his place of work and affects his personal and professional life.

Estranged couple Ethan and Sophie find doubles of themselves trapped in the retreat house their marriage counselor recommended in Charlie McDowell's The One I Love (2014). The 2018 science fiction film Annihilation features a doppelgänger in the climax. Jordan Peele's horror film Us (2019) finds the Wilson family attacked by doubles of themselves known as "the Tethered". In The Rise of Skywalker (2019), when Rey is looking for a Sith wayfinder on the ruins of the Death Star II, she encounters an evil version of herself. In the 2026 romantic horror film Leviticus, a violent entity shapeshifts into the person its victims desire most, using their same-sex attraction against them by threatening or killing them.

=== Television ===
The episode of Alfred Hitchcock Presents which originally aired December 4, 1955, under the title "The Case of Mr. Pelham", starring Tom Ewell as the victim of his own Doppelgänger and directed by Hitchcock himself. It is an adaptation of The Strange Case of Mr. Pelham, a short story (later expanded in book form in 1957) by English writer Anthony Armstrong. In the episode "Mirror Image" of the first series of The Twilight Zone (originally aired 25 February 1960), a young woman repeatedly sees her double in a New York Bus Terminal. After she is taken off to an asylum, the episodes ends with a second character trying to catch his double. In the 1985 reboot of the Twilight Zone, the first segment of the premiere episode was "Shatterday", an adaptation of a short story of the same name by Harlan Ellison. The segment follows a man who finds that a double of himself has moved into his apartment and is taking over his life.

The plot of the "Firefall" episode of Kolchak: The Night Stalker (originally aired 8 November 1974) revolves around the spirit of a deceased arsonist that becomes the doppelgänger of a renowned orchestra conductor. He starts killing off people close to the conductor (by spontaneous human combustion), with the ultimate goal of taking over the conductor's body. The Hammer House of Horror episode "The Two Faces of Evil" (originally aired 29 November 1980), focuses on the part of the doppelgänger mythology where meeting yours is a harbinger of your imminent death.

In the third season episode of Star Trek: The Next Generation, "Allegiance", (originally aired on March 26, 1990) Captain Picard has been abducted and a doppelgänger has taken his place.

In the season two finale of Twin Peaks—"Beyond Life and Death" (originally aired 10 June 1991)—Special Agent Dale Cooper encounters a variety of doppelgängers in the Black Lodge, one of whom is a malevolent version of himself. Cooper's doppelgänger switches places with him at the conclusion of the episode, trapping the original in the Black Lodge. A total of three different doppelgängers are dispatched from the mysterious Black Lodge to bedevil the forces of good in Showtime's 2017 series Twin Peaks: The Return.

In Buffy the Vampire Slayer's season three episode "Doppelgangland" (originally aired 23 February 1999), Willow encounters her vampire double who was first introduced seven episodes previously (in "The Wish", originally aired 8 December 1998). In the fifth-season episode "The Replacement" (10 October 2000), Xander discovers his own doppelgänger (portrayed by the actor's identical twin brother). In How I Met Your Mother, all five main characters have run-ins with their doppelgängers at certain points. Ted, whose doppelgänger is a luchador, Marshall, whose doppelgänger has a mustache, Robin, whose doppelgänger is a lesbian, Lily, whose doppelgänger is a stripper connected to Russian gangsters, and Barney, whose doppelgänger is a doctor.

In the 2010s CW supernatural drama series, The Vampire Diaries, actress Nina Dobrev portrayed the roles of several doppelgängers; Amara (the first doppelgänger), Tatia (the second), Katerina Petrova/Katherine Pierce (the third) and Elena Gilbert (the fourth). The series mainly focused on the doppelgängers of the sweet & genuine Elena and the malevolent Katherine. In the same series, Paul Wesley portrays Stefan Salvatore and his doppelgängers Tom Avery and Silas. Starting with the second season of The Flash, doppelgängers play a key role in the development of the series. Doubles from various Earths in the multiverse are defined as such. The person with multiple counterparts who appeared in the series was Harrison Wells. In the Italian supernatural drama television series Curon (aired 2020), the lake of the titular town spawns murderous doppelgängers.

=== Music videos ===
The theme of doppelgänger has been frequently used in music videos, such as Aqua's "Turn Back Time" (1998), Dido's "Hunter" (2001), Madonna's "Die Another Day" (2002), Kelly Rowland's "Commander" (2010), and Britney Spears's "Hold It Against Me" (2011).

=== Video games ===
In Prince of Persia, the hero must fight his doppelganger only winning through nonviolence. The 1987 Nintendo game Zelda II: The Adventure of Link features an enemy known as Dark Link, also known as Shadow Link, who serves as the final boss of the game. Dark Link has since made appearances as boss characters in the following titles, and as a cameo appearance in the Super Smash Bros. series. The 1995 Ubisoft platforming video game Rayman, features and enemy during the final level in Candy Château, the main antagonist Mr Dark creates Bad Rayman using magic, an evil shadow "doppelgänger" of Rayman who copies every single move Rayman makes and causes Rayman to die if they touch. The 1998 video game Crash Bandicoot: Warped has a character called fake crash appear after completing the game. The 1995 video game Alone in the Dark 3 features a nameless enemy that Edward Carnby calls "his double", a doppelgänger that mirrors the protagonist's moves to stop him from climbing the Water Tank. He is fused to Carnby after they touch hands.

The 1997 Konami game Castlevania: Symphony of the Night features an enemy boss known simply as "Doppelganger", a duplicate of the main protagonist Alucard. The enemy mimics the movement and attack patterns of the player. The 1998 computer role playing game Baldur's Gate employs doppelgängers as a plot device, and as a type of enemy monster that antagonizes the player's party of characters, as do both of the games major sequels. The game series uses Dungeons and Dragons mechanics, in which the existence of doppelgängers as evil magical creatures is a feature. In the 1999 game Final Fantasy VIII, SeeD mercenaries and Forest Owls resistance fighters devise a complicated plan to kidnap the president of Galbadia Vinzer Deling, which includes switching the presidential train wagon from its tracks and replacing it with a mockup. Deling foresees the plan and sends a shapeshifter monster to take his place, who attacks the game protagonists. The monster is ultimately killed, but the plan's failure forces the Forest Owls into hiding.

The 2002 MMORPG Ragnarok Online features a boss-type monster named "Doppelganger", a demon who summons Nightmares that looks like a shadow of the default appearance for the male Swordsman class. The 2005 Capcom game Devil May Cry 3: Dante's Awakening also features an enemy boss known as "Doppelganger" that is fought near the end of the game. Resembling Dante's Devil Trigger form, it also mimics several of Dante's moves. Upon defeating the demon boss, Dante acquires a style "referred to as the Doppelganger style" that allows him to create a shadow copy of himself to assist him in battle in exchange for consuming Dante's Devil Trigger Gauge. The 2007 videogame Super Mario Galaxy features a doppelgänger named Cosmic Mario, where he appears in Honeyhive Galaxy, Freezeflame Galaxy, Gold Leaf Galaxy, and Sea Side Galaxy under the effect of the Cosmic Clone comet effect, and challenges Mario to a race.

The 2010 video game Alan Wake, along with its 2012 sequel Alan Wake's American Nightmare and 2023 sequel Alan Wake 2, feature the character of Mr. Scratch, a doppelgänger of protagonist Alan Wake created as a supernatural manifestation of negative rumors spread about the character after his disappearance at the end of the first game, and who seeks to take over and ruin Wake's life. The 2010 and 2011 videogames Super Mario Galaxy 2 and Super Mario 3D Land features Cosmic Mario clones that chases Mario through some levels. Super Mario 3D World features the Double Cherry item, which produces a doppelgänger of the character who collected it, which responds to the same inputs as the original.

The 2015 Konami game Metal Gear Solid V: The Phantom Pain plot revolves around the story of Punished "Venom" Snake who has been chosen as a decoy to replicate and take on the persona of the legendary soldier Big Boss. He is referred to as Big Boss's Doppelgänger going forward. Venom Snake was originally a Combat Medic who worked closely with Big Boss and even dived in front of Big Boss during an explosion to save him leaving the medic with helicopter shrapnel stuck in the appearance of a horn in his forehead. Following the explosion whilst in a comatose state, the medic is unknowingly selected to be physically altered via plastic surgery to become Big Boss's Doppelgänger/Stand-in and also brainwashed to believe himself to actually be Big Boss.

The 2015 and 2017 Touhou games Urban Legend in Limbo and Antinomy of Common Flowers feature the character of Sumireko Usami, whose legendary attack is labeled "Doppelganger". The 2016 game Dishonored 2 features a character, Duke Luca Abele of Serkonos, who in the second-last mission of the game is revealed to have employed a "body double" as protection. Players must make a choice to either eliminate the Duke or work with his body double for a non-lethal approach to the mission.

=== Web series ===
The Alternates, the main antagonistic force in the analog horror web series The Mandela Catalogue, are a race of demons that are marked by their ability to almost perfectly replicate human beings.

== In non-fiction ==
The idea of having a doppelganger is a central theme in Naomi Klein's 2023 memoir and political analysis Doppelganger: A Trip into the Mirror World. In it, Klein examines the current climate of political polarization and conspiracy thinking by contrasting Klein's worldview with that of Naomi Wolf, for whom Klein is often confused.

== Scientific applications ==
Research has found that people who are "true" look-alikes have more similar genes than people who do not look like each other. They share genes affecting not only the face but also some phenotypes of physique and behavior, also indicating that (their) differences in the epigenome and microbiome contribute only modestly to human variability in facial appearance. Heautoscopy is a term used in psychiatry and neurology for the hallucination of "seeing one's own body at a distance". It can occur as a symptom in schizophrenia and epilepsy, and is considered a possible explanation for doppelgänger phenomena. Criminologists find a practical application in the concepts of facial familiarity and similarity due to the instances of wrongful convictions based on eyewitness testimony. In one case, a person spent 17 years behind bars persistently denying any involvement with the crime of which he was accused. He was finally released after someone was found who shared a striking resemblance and the same first name.

In 1914, Otto Rank began to study the concept of the Doppelgänger and its potential in psychoanalysis. Later in 1919, Sigmund Freud would expand on the psychoanalytical value of Doppelgängers in his work The Uncanny. Freud explains that the Doppelgänger, or 'the double,' is an idea rooted in the narcissism of children and is found in mirrors, guardian spirits, souls, and the thoughts of terror associated with death. The double begins as a comforting symbol of immortality, but it soon ends as a bringer of death. The Doppelgänger is also a manifestation of repressed thoughts related to the psychoanalytical concept of negation. The negation involved with the appearance of the Doppelgänger is used as a tool to map out an individual's ego.

== See also ==
- Alter ego – Alternative self distinct from the actual identity
- Bilocation – Alleged supernatural ability to be in two places at once
- Capgras delusion – Psychiatric disorder
- Changeling – Creature in European folklore
- Cloning – Process of producing individual organisms with identical genomes
- Copycat crime
- Gothic double – Literary motif
- Ikiryō – Spirit in Japanese folklore
- Look-alike – Person who closely resembles another person
- Multiverse – Hypothetical group of multiple universes
- Pareidolia – Perception of meaningful patterns or images in random or vague stimuli
- Qareen – Spiritual double of human in Islam
- Shapeshifting – Ability to physically transform in mythology, folklore and speculative fiction
- Syndrome of subjective doubles – Delusion of having a doppelgänger
- True self and false self
- Twin – One of two offspring produced by the same pregnancy
