= Natuzza Evolo =

Italian stigmatic (1924–2009)

Servant of God Natuzza Evolo
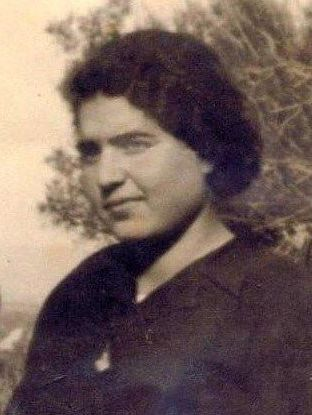
- Natuzza in the 1950s
- Born: Fortunata Nicolace; 23 August 1924; Paravati di Mileto, Vibo Valentia, Italy
- Died: 1 November 2009 (aged 85); Paravati di Mileto, Vibo Valentia, Italy

Fortunata "Natuzza" Evolo (Italian pronunciation: [fortuˈnaːta naˈtuttsa ˈɛːvolo]; 23 August 1924 – 1 November 2009) was an Italian Catholic mystic who has been declared a Servant of God. She is said to have evidenced stigmata.

== Life ==
A few months before Natuzza's birth at Paravati near Mileto in Calabria, her father emigrated to Argentina to look for work and the family never saw him again. Maria Angela Valente (Natuzza's mother) took on all sorts of work to feed her numerous family. As soon as she was able to, Natuzza (a diminutive of Fortunata, a common name in Calabria) tried to help her mother and brothers. She was therefore unable to go to school and indeed never learned to read or write. In 1944 she married Pasquale Nicolace, a carpenter, and they had five children.

From quite an early age, Natuzza was said to have had visions of Our Lord and Our Lady. There is a 10-volume bibliography on Natuzza by Prof. Valerio Marinelli with many interviews where she explains these facts. The bibliography also has interviews with others who claim to have been healed by her prayers or to have received other graces.

Natuzza became known for the appearance on her body of blood-coloured images and words around the time of Easter and these caused her great psychological and physical pain. Some of the words were found to be Hebrew and Aramaic which was strange because she could not read or write, even in her native Italian. For decades devout Catholics from Calabria, then the rest of Italy and other parts of the world, began coming to her to ask for advice and prayers and to ask her for information about the souls of their relatives.

On 13 May 1987 work began on building a shrine in Paravati dedicated to the Immaculate Heart of Mary, Refuge of Sinners, destined to be her home for the rest of her life and to provide accommodation for the elderly. This is still awaiting authorisation by the Archbishop of Mileto. Italian television crews came several times to interview her and in 1994 she published her autobiography. A documentary film about her was produced in 1987. In 2007 a special programme was broadcast about an entrepreneur from Calabria who had recovered from leukaemia and he interviewed Natuzza.

Fortunata Evolo was admitted to hospital on 29 October 2009 but almost immediately she was released and died of renal failure on the morning of Sunday 1 November at the Immaculate Heart old people's home. The Church bells were ordered by the Parish Priest, Natuzza's spiritual director, to peal out for the Feast of All Saints. Thousands of Catholics came from all over Europe to pay their respects and the cause for her beatification is expected to be started very soon.

== Reception ==
Psychotherapist and skeptic Armando De Vincentiis has published an article claiming that Evolo may have suffered from painful bruising syndrome:

It appears quite simple for the reader to understand how the entire phenomenology of Natuzza Evolo can be compatible with the hypothesis of Gardner-Diamond syndrome or psychogenic purpura. Signs of Natuzza were not limited only to the stigmata of the hands or feet sacred iconography, but were also occurring in different parts of the body. At the same time, as an adult, the conviction to communicate with the dead, the sudden ecstatic journeys described, beyond the mystical-religious interpretations outside of any scientific evidence, does not leave much doubt about the psychological implications of the phenomenon."

In July 2019, a decree from Luigi Renzo, the bishop of Roman Catholic Diocese of Mileto-Nicotera-Tropea, ordered the suppression of the Immaculate Heart of Mary Refuge of Souls Foundation, which had been founded by Evolo.
