= Michael Banim =

Irish novelists and short story writer

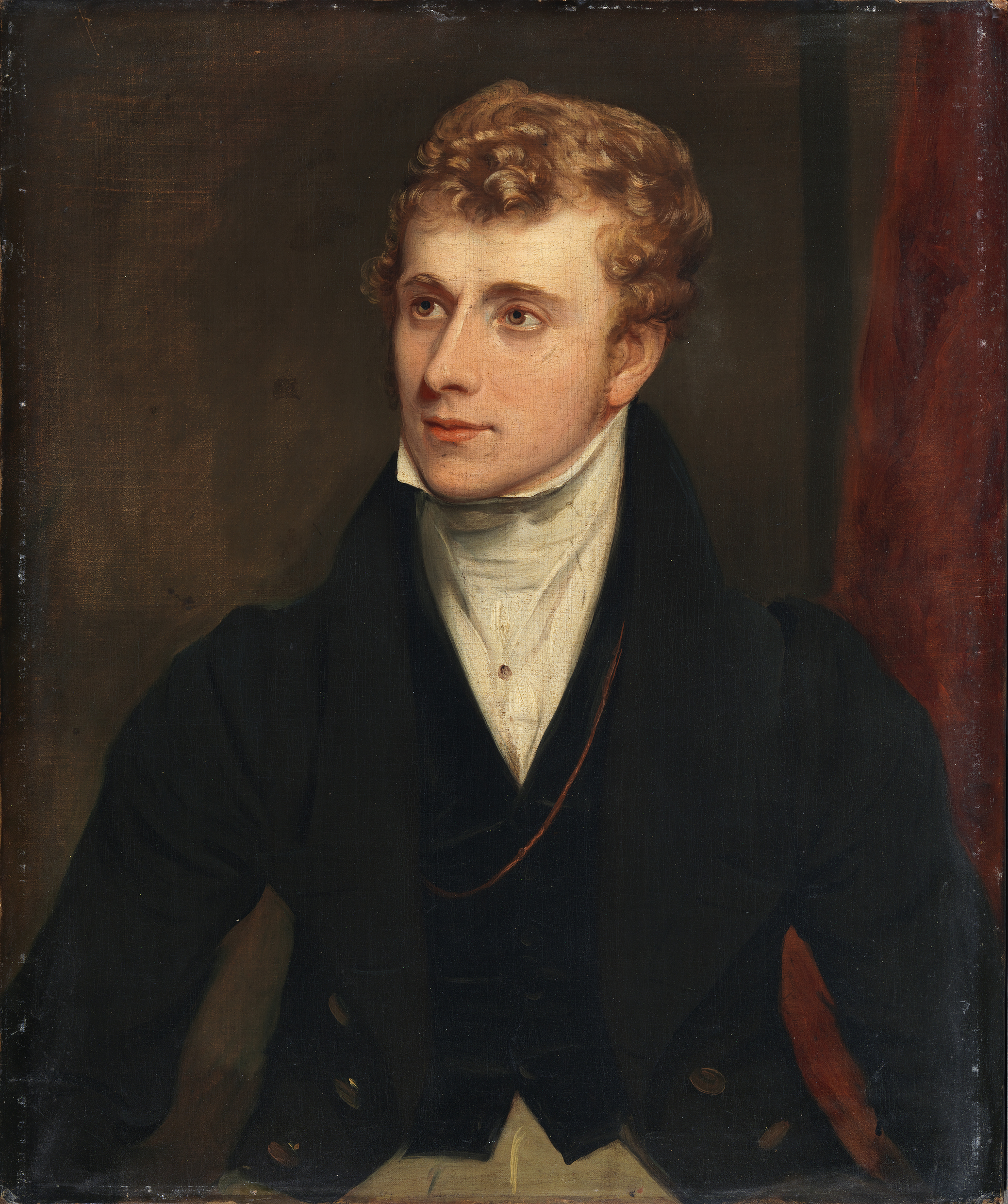
- Born: 5 August 1796
- Died: 30 August 1874
- Occupation: Writer

Michael Banim (5 August 1796 – 30 August 1874) was an Irish novelist and short story writer. Brother of John Banim, he was born in Kilkenny, and died in Booterstown.

== Personal life ==
Michael was educated at Dr. Magrath's Catholic school. He went on to study for the bar, but a decline in his father's business caused him to retire from his studies. He returned home to take over the family business, which he returned to prosperity, restoring his parents to material and mental comfort. In 1826 he visited John in London, making the acquaintance of many distinguished men of letters. When the struggle for Catholic emancipation was at its height, Michael worked energetically for the cause. In 1828, he had the honor of a visit from the Comte de Montalembert, who had read the ‘O'Hara Tales’ and was then on a tour through Ireland.

When John Banim was struck down by illness, his brother wrote and earnestly invited him to return to Kilkenny and share his home. "You speak too much," he observed in one letter, "about what you think you owe me. As you are my brother, never allude to it again. My creed on this subject is, that one brother should not want while the other can supply him." However, John remained in France, seeking medical care in Paris.

In 1840, Michael married Catherine O'Dwyer who had two daughters, Mathilde and Mary. Although a man of means, in less than a year he lost almost all of his fortune through the failure of a merchant. Poor health followed. He was appointed postmaster of Kilkenny in 1852, which he held until illness forced him to retire in 1873. He also served a term as mayor. His health failing, he went with his family to reside at Booterstown, near Dublin, where he died in 1874. His widow was granted a civil list pension.

== Works ==
Around 1822 John Banim broached to Michael his idea for a series of national tales. Michael assisted John in the O'Hara Tales, where he used the name "Abel O'Hara," and there is difficulty in allocating their respective contributions. While John was the more experienced writer, Michael provided material based on his social observations. They revised each other's work; according to Patrick Joseph Murray's Life of John Banim. Michael wrote in such hours as he could snatch from business, and was the principal author of about thirteen of the twenty-four works attributed to the brothers, including Crohoore of the Bill-Hook, The Croppy, and Father Connell. Michael Banim was amiable, unambitious, modest, and generous. He kept himself in the background, letting his younger brother have all the honor of their joint production. After the death of John, Michael wrote Clough Fionn (1852), and The Town of the Cascades (1864). In 1861 he wrote prefaces and notes for a reprint of the "O'Hara" novels by the publishing firm Sadlier of New York.

Banim, whose writing was influenced by the Romantic movement, portrayed an Ireland suffering under the lingering effects of the Penal laws.

== See also ==
- John and Michael Banim bibliography

== Sources ==
- Author and Bookinfo.com
