= Fetch (folklore) =

Part of Irish folklore

A fetch is a supernatural double or an apparition of a living person. The sighting of a fetch is regarded as an inevitable omen, usually for impending death to oneself, or a loved one.

== Description ==
The fetch is described as an exact, spectral double of a living human, whose appearance is regarded as ominous. A sighting of a fetch is generally taken as a message of a forthcoming death, though John and Michael Banim report that if the double appears in the morning rather than the evening, it is instead a sign of a long life in store. As such, it is similar to the Germanic doppelgänger and to some conceptions of the British wraith. Francis Grose associated the term with Northern England in his 1787 Provincial Glossary.

== Origins and etymology ==
Accounts of the origin of fetch are complicated by a word fæċċe, found in two textually-related Old English glossaries, the Corpus Glossary and the First Cleopatra Glossary. In theory, fæċċe may be an Old English form of Modern English fetch. In the glossaries, fæċċe is given as a lemma (a word to be glossed); given that most such words in these glossaries are in Latin, it ought to be a Latin word, but no such Latin word is known, leading some scholars to suggest it may be Old Irish. Since it is glossed with the Old English word mære, which denotes female supernatural being associated with causing illness and nightmares, it could be the origin of the Hiberno-English fetch.[1] Recent research has not arrived at a consensus on this question.

The etymology of fetch is obscure and the origin of the term is unknown. It may derive from the verb "fetch"; the compound "fetch-life", evidently referring to a psychopomp who "fetches" the souls of the dying, is attested in Richard Stanyhurst's 1583 translation of the Aeneid and the first edition of the Oxford English Dictionary suggested this usage may indicate the origin of the term fetch.

== Appearances in literature ==
Corresponding to its contemporary prominence in "national superstitions", the fetch appeared in Irish literature starting in early 19th century. "The fetch superstition" is the topic of John and Michael Banim's Gothic story "The Fetches" from their 1825 work Tales by the O'Hara Family and Walter Scott used the term in his Letters on Demonology and Witchcraft, published in 1830, in a brief reference to "his ... fetch or wraith, or double-ganger".

Patrick Kennedy's 1866 folklore collection Legendary Fiction of the Irish Celts includes a brief account of "The Doctor's Fetch", in which a fetch's appearance signals death for the titular doctor. More recently, "The Fetch" is the malevolent narrator of Patrick McCabe's 2010 novel The Stray Sod Country, wherein it temporarily inhabits the bodies of the residents of a small Irish town, causing them to commit both psychological and physical harm to themselves and others.

Robert Aickman's 1980 collection of "strange stories" Intrusions: Strange Tales contains his story "The Fetch". In it, the eponymous "fetch" (actually described as a Scottish Cailleach or "carlin" (hag)) is a portent of impending death for the Leith family, leaving a trail of loch water behind her. The story has more recently been anthologised in a reprint collection of Aickman's work titled The Wine-Dark Sea (London: Faber, 2014) and in Johnny Mains's 2022 collection Celtic Weird: Tales of Wicked Folklore and Dark Mythology.

In Dead Heat by Patricia Briggs, Charles and Anna encounter a fetch pretending to be a preschooler named Amethyst. Charles recites a riddle and the fetch answers "A fetch! A fetch! A fetch!" Amethyst then disappears and a bundle of sticks falls to the ground. Ribbons "tied the sticks in a semblance of a human figure, arms and legs and head. There was a scrap of hair banded top and bottom and shoved into the body of the thing."

May Daye, a recurring character in Seanan McGuire's October Daye series. She enters the storyline as one of the night-haunts, and becomes October's fetch after drinking her blood. Fetches have the memories and physical characteristics of their subject, and die when their subject does. Possibly because they often attach themselves to heroes, this usually happens in a year or so--the why of this is unknown, as fae are close to immortal. It is considered time to get one's affairs in order. The fae have come to see them as an omen of death. May is the only known Fetch to have separated from her subject.

== Appearances in popular culture ==
- "The Fetch" is an episode of the BBC supernatural anthology series Leap in the Dark, specifically Season 3, Episode 2, which first aired on January 21, 1977. This episode dramatizes the famous 19th-century paranormal case of Émilie Sagée, a French schoolteacher who was allegedly haunted by her own fetch. Sagée's double would frequently appear next to her, mimicking her movements or appearing in different parts of the school simultaneously, eventually leading to her dismissal from multiple teaching positions. The writer of the episode was Anne Owen; the director was Colin Godman; and the program starred Juliet Harmer as Émilie Sagée and Lalla Ward as Anthonie.
- An adapted version of a fetch appears in the Dungeons & Dragons role-playing game in the Monstrous Compendium Dragonlance Appendix.
- A fetch appears in the Season 15 Doctor Who story Image of the Fendahl (1977) set in the fictional village of Fetchborough, and Fetch Priory, both named after the apparition.
- The term Fetch appears in Season 2 of Motherland: Fort Salem.
- The term appears in book two of the All Souls Trilogy.
- In The X-Files episode Elegy, Fox Mulder mentions the concept of a fetch.
- The Spiderwick Chronicles, based on the children's fantasy books by Tony DiTerlizzi and Holly Black, chronicles the adventures of the Grace children who move from New York to Spiderwick Mansion in Michigan. One character, Calliope, played by Alyvia Alyn Lind, is a Fetch.
- In the October Daye series by Seanan McGuire, the heroine's Fetch is one of the main characters.
- The term Fetch appears in Season 1 episode 3 of The Outsider (HBO) .
- In The Haunting of Hill House (TV series), Eleanor (Nell) Crain is confronted with a fetch who foreshadows her death.

== See also ==
- Doppelgänger
- Ghost
- Betobeto-san
