= Beatriz Serrano =

Spanish writer and journalist (born 1989)

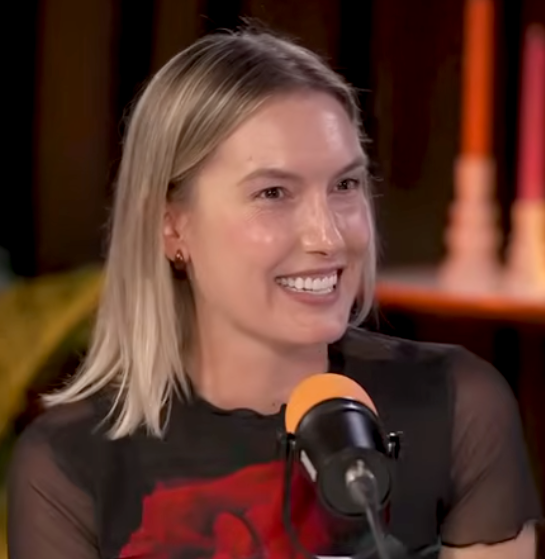
- Serrano in 2025
- Born: Beatriz Serrano Molina; 1989 (age 36–37); Madrid, Spain
- Education: Complutense University of Madrid
- Occupations: Writer; journalist; podcaster

Beatriz Serrano Molina (born 1989) is a Spanish journalist and writer. A columnist for El País after years in digital media, she co-hosts the podcast Arsénico Caviar with Guillermo Alonso, which won a 2023 Ondas podcast award; her novels are El descontento (2023) and Fuego en la garganta (2024), the latter the finalist for the 2024 Premio Planeta, an edition won by Paloma Sánchez-Garnica's Victoria.

== Early life and education ==
Serrano was born in Madrid in 1989 and graduated in journalism from the Complutense University of Madrid, going on to work in digital journalism. Her parents were from Madrid, but she grew up in Parque Alcosa, a working-class neighbourhood of Alfafar, just south of Valencia.

== Journalism and podcasting ==
Serrano built her career in digital journalism, writing for BuzzFeed, Vanity Fair, GQ, S Moda and Vogue before joining El País. At El País she writes opinion columns and features on trends, work and internet culture.

With the writer Guillermo Alonso she co-hosts Arsénico Caviar, a Podium Podcast production that she has described as approaching its subjects "through criticism rather than admiration": "a hating podcast"; in 2023 it shared the award for best conversational podcast at the second Premios Ondas Globales del Podcast, handed out at a gala in Málaga, with the Mexican show Se regalan dudas.

== Literary career ==
Serrano published her first novel, El descontento, in 2023; her second, Fuego en la garganta, followed in 2024.

== Awards ==
- 2023: Ondas Globales del Podcast award for best conversational podcast (shared with Se regalan dudas), for Arsénico Caviar.
- 2024: Finalist of the Premio Planeta, for Fuego en la garganta.

== Works ==
- El descontento. Temas de Hoy, 2023.
  - Discontent. Translated by Mara Faye Lethem. Vintage, 2025 (English translation).
- Fuego en la garganta. Planeta, 2024.
