= José Ramón Ónega =

Spanish politician and journalist (1939–2021)

Xosé Ramón Ónega López, known in Spanish as José Ramón Ónega López (8 March 1939 – 7 February 2021), was a Spanish journalist and politician.

== Biography ==
Ónega was born in Mosteiro, in Galicia, on 8 March 1939. He made his debut in journalism with infantile collaborations with El Progreso, as correspondent in Mosteiro. He graduated in law from the University of Santiago de Compostela in 1962, and while studying he collaborated as head of the information department of the Spanish University Union, with the newspaper La Noche.

At that time he began his political career, which he continued as a technician in the state administration in the Spanish Ministry of the Interior. He moved to Madrid, where he would reside for most of his professional career, and also studied as a lawyer in that city. In the last years of Franco's dictatorship he taught an introductory course on Public and Private Law at the Complutense University of Madrid between 1974 and 1976.

Onega began to have a public presence when during the transition period he occupied positions of political relevance. Under the governments of Adolfo Suárez and Leopoldo Calvo-Sotelo he was Deputy Director General of Internal Policy between 1977 and 1978, and Deputy Director General of the Technical Office of the Undersecretary uf Public Order between 1978 and 1979. He was also Civil Governor of the province of Zamora between 1979 and 1982, and of Bizkaia between 1982 and 1984.

With the arrival to power of the PSOE in 1982, he remained linked to the Ministry of the Interior as Inspector General of Services between 1984 and 1993. In 1996, the newly government of José María Aznar appointed him Director General of Internal Policy, being Minister Jaime Mayor Oreja, office he held until 2004.

He was also president of the National Commission against Sports Violence and president of the Interministerial Commission for Asylum and Refuge. He was director of the Casa de Galicia in Madrid from 2009 until the date of his death in 2021.

== Work ==
In addition to his political work, he wrote several books on history and ethnography, as well as novels and poetry:

=== History ===
- Los judíos en el reino de Galicia (1981)
- Odorio el Africano. Colonización de Galicia en el s.VIII (1988)
- Pasado, presente e futuro de A Pontenova (1988)
- Perfil histórico, artístico y paisajístico del Concello de Pol, Lugo (1988)
- José Mª Díaz Sanjurjo. Un gallego en Vietnam (1991)

=== Novels ===
- El enigma de Jose An (1991)
- El promonitorio de los claveles marinos (1999)

=== Poetry ===
- Sol de poniente (2004)

== Personal life and death ==
He was brother of journalist Fernando Ónega and uncle of Sonsoles Ónega. He married María Esther Coladas-Guzmán in 1966, with whom he had three children.

Ónega died in Madrid on 7 February 2021 from COVID-19 at the age of 81, a few weeks after the death of his son "Monchito" at the age of 52.
