= Premio Planeta de Novela =

Spanish literary prize

The Premio Planeta de Novela is a Spanish literary prize, awarded since 1952 by the Spanish publisher Grupo Planeta to an original unpublished novel written in Spanish. It is one of about 16 literary prizes given by Planeta.

Financially, it is the most valuable literary award in the world for an author or book, with the winner receiving €1,000,000. It was created by José Manuel Lara Hernández in 1952 and is awarded on 15 October, St Teresa's day, Teresa being the name of Lara's wife.

Since 1974 there has also been an award to the runner up, which now stands at €200,000.

== Criticism ==
In recent years its credibility has been called into question, with the first prize often awarded to authors published by Planeta, and the second to less known authors. The award has been declined by Miguel Delibes and Ernesto Sábato, both Planeta authors.

In 2005, an Argentinian court fined Planeta 10,000 pesos after finding that there had been fraud in awarding the Argentinian version of the prize to Ricardo Piglia in 1997.

While the manuscripts are presented under a pseudonym, it is not unusual for the names of the winners to be leaked days or weeks before the official announcement.

== List of winners ==
Winners listed first, followed by runners up:

2026 – La hora antes del Alba (Isabel Allende)

La Añoranza (Sergio Hernández Carrasco)

2025 – Vera, una historia de amor (Juan del Val)

Cuando el viento hable (Ángela Banzas)

2024 – Victoria (Paloma Sánchez-Garnica)

Fuego en la garganta (Beatriz Serrano)

2023 – Las hijas de la criada (Sonsoles Ónega)

La sangre del padre (Alfonso Goizueta)

2022 – Lejos de Luisiana (Luz Gabás)

Historias de mujeres casadas (Cristina Campos)

2021 – La bestia (Carmen Mola)

Últimos días en Berlín (Paloma Sánchez-Garnica)

2020 – Aquitania (Eva García Sáenz de Urturi)

Un océano para llegar a ti (Sandra Barneda)

2019 – Terra Alta (Javier Cercas)

Alegría (Manuel Vilas)

2018 – Yo, Julia (Santiago Posteguillo)

Un mar violeta oscuro (Ayanta Barilli)

2017 – El fuego invisible (Javier Sierra)

Niebla en Tánger (Cristina López Barrio)

2016 – Todo esto te daré (Dolores Redondo)

El asesinato de Sócrates (Marcos Chicot)

2015 – Hombres desnudos (Alicia Giménez Bartlett)

La isla de Alice (Daniel Sánchez Arévalo)

2014 – Milena o el fémur más bello del mundo (Jorge Zepeda Patterson)

Mi color favorito es verte (Pilar Eyre)

2013 – El cielo ha vuelto (Clara Sánchez)

El buen hijo (Ángeles González-Sinde)

2012 – La marca del meridiano (Lorenzo Silva)

La vida imaginaria (Mara Torres)

2011 – El imperio eres tú (Javier Moro)

Tiempo de arena (Inma Chacón)

2010 – Riña de gatos. Madrid, 1936, (Eduardo Mendoza)

El tiempo mientras tanto, (Carmen Amoraga)

2009 – Contra el viento (Ángeles Caso)

La bailarina y el inglés (Emilio Calderón)

2008 – La hermandad de la buena suerte (Fernando Savater)

Muerte entre poetas (Ángela Vallvey)

2007 – El mundo (Juan José Millás)

Villa Diamante (Boris Izaguirre)

2006 – La Fortuna de Matilda Turpin (Álvaro Pombo)

En tiempo de prodigios (Marta Rivera de la Cruz)

2005 – Pasiones Romanas (Maria de la Pau Janer)

Y de repente un ángel (Jaime Bayly)

2004 – Un milagro en equilibrio (Lucía Etxebarria)

La vida en el abismo (Ferran Torrent)

2003 – El baile de la Victoria (Antonio Skármeta)

El amante albanés (Susana Fortes)

2002 – El huerto de mi amada (Alfredo Bryce Echenique)

Las mujeres que hay en mí (Maria de la Pau Janer)

2001 – La canción de Dorotea (Rosa Regàs)

Lo que está en mi corazón (Marcela Serrano)

2000 – Mientras vivimos (Maruja Torres)

Cuaderno de viaje (Salvador Compán)

1999 – Melocotones helados (Espido Freire)

El egoísta (Nativel Preciado)

1998 – Pequeñas infamias (Carmen Posadas)

Pura vida (José María Mendiluce)

1997 – La tempestad (Juan Manuel de Prada)

Mi corazón que baila con espigas (Carmen Rigalt)

1996 – El desencuentro (Fernando Schwartz)

Te di la vida entera (Zoé Valdés)

1995 – La mirada del otro (Fernando G. Delgado)

La fuente de la vida (Lourdes Ortiz)

1994 – La cruz de San Andrés (Camilo José Cela)

El peso de las sombras (Ángeles Caso)

1993 – Lituma en los Andes (Mario Vargas Llosa)

El jardín de las dudas (Fernando Savater)

1992 – La prueba del laberinto (Fernando Sánchez Dragó)

La cruz de Santiago (Eduardo Chamorro)

1991 – El jinete polaco (Antonio Muñoz Molina)

Los espejos paralelos (Néstor Luján)

1990 – El manuscrito carmesí (Antonio Gala)

El camino del corazón (Fernando Sánchez Dragó)

1989 – Queda la noche (Soledad Puértolas)

Las hogueras del rey (Pedro Casals)

1988 – Filomeno, a mi pesar (Gonzalo Torrente Ballester)

El triángulo. Alumna de la libertad (Ricardo de la Cierva)

1987 – En busca del Unicornio (Juan Eslava Galán)

El mal amor (Fernando Fernán Gómez)

1986 – No digas que fue un sueño (Terenci Moix)

La jeringuilla (Pedro Casals)

1985 – Yo, el rey (Juan Antonio Vallejo-Nágera)

Pío XII, la escolta mora y un general sin un ojo (Francisco Umbral)

1984 – Crónica sentimental en rojo (Francisco González Ledesma)

La guerra del Wolfram (Raúl Guerra Garrido)

1983 – La guerra del general Escobar (José Luis Olaizola)

La canción del pirata (Fernando Quiñones)

1982 – Jaque a la Dama (Jesús Fernández Santos)

La conspiración del Golfo (Fernando Schwartz)

1981 – Y Dios en la última playa (Cristóbal Zaragoza)

Llegará tarde a Hendaya (José María del Val)

1980 – Volavérunt (Antonio Larreta)

El aire de un crimen (Juan Benet)

1979 – Los mares del Sur (Manuel Vázquez Montalbán)

Las mil noches de Hortensia Romero (Fernando Quiñones)

1978 – La muchacha de las bragas de oro (Juan Marsé)

Los invitados (Alfonso Grosso)

1977 – Autobiografía de Federico Sánchez (Jorge Semprún)

Divorcio para una virgen rota (Ángel Palomino)

1976 – En el día de hoy (Jesús Torbado)

La buena muerte (Alfonso Grosso)

1975 – La gangrena (Mercedes Salisachs)

El pájaro africano (Víctor Alba)

1974 – Icaria, Icaria... (Xavier Benguerel)

Gran café (Pedro de Lorenzo)

1973 – Azaña (Carlos Rojas)

Adagio confidencial (Mercedes Salisachs)

1972 – La cárcel (Jesús Zárate)

El sitio de nadie (Hilda Perera)

1971 – Condenados a vivir (José María Gironella)

Seno Ramiro Pinilla

1970 – La cruz invertida (Marcos Aguinis)

Retrato de una bruja (Luis de Castresana)

1969 – En la vida de Ignacio Morel (Ramón J. Sender)

Redoble por rancas (Manuel Scorza)

1968 – Con la noche a cuestas (Manuel Ferrand)

No hay aceras (Pedro Entenza)

1967 – Las últimas banderas (Ángel María de Lera)

Tiempo de morir (Eugenio Juan Zappietro)

1966 – A tientas y a ciegas (Marta Portal)

Stress (Santiago Moncada)

1965 – Equipaje de amor para la tierra (Rodrigo Rubio)

Spanish Show (Julio Manegat)

1964 – Las hogueras (Concha Alós)

El adúltero y el dios (Vizarco)

1963 – El cacique (Luis Romero)

El santo y el demonio (Víctor Chamorro)

1962 – Se enciende y apaga una luz (Ángel Vázquez)

El pozo de los monos (Juan Antonio Usera)

1961 – La mujer de otro (Torcuato Luca de Tena)

La oración del diablo (Andrés Avelino Artís)

1960 – El atentado (Tomás Salvador)

El borrador (Manuel San Martín)

1959 – La noche (Andrés Bosch)

El grito de la paloma (José María Castillo)

1958 – Pasos sin huellas (Fernando Bermúdez de Castro)

La ciudad amarilla (Julio Manegat)

1957 – La paz empieza nunca (Emilio Romero (writer))

Siete puertas (Elisa Brufal)

1956 – El desconocido (Carmen Kurtz)

A fuego lento (Raúl Grien)

1955 – Tres pisadas de hombre (Antonio Prieto)

Carretera intermedia (Mercedes Salisachs)

1954 – Pequeño teatro (Ana María Matute)

El fulgor y la sangre (Ignacio Aldecoa)

1953 – Una casa con goteras (Santiago Lorén)

Otros son los caminos (Antonio Ortiz Muñoz)

1952 – En la noche no hay caminos (Juan José Mira)

Tierra de promisión (Severino Fernández)

== See also ==
- List of literary awards
- Spanish literature
