= Juan José Mira =

Spanish writer

Juan Jose Mira was a Spanish writer. In 1952, he became the first winner of the Premio Planeta, one of the most important literary prizes in Spain, for his book En la noche no hay caminos.

He was born Juan José Moreno Sánchez in 1907 in the town of La Puerta de Segura. He moved to Madrid to study law and spent the Spanish Civil War working at Mundo Obrero. Fighting for the left, he was detained in a concentration camp before moving to Barcelona, where he remained close to the Partido Comunista. He worked as an editor and screenwriter, and was linked to the literary circles at Ateneo de Barcelona. In spite of Francoist censorship, he published another novel Mañana es ayer in 1955.

On the strength of these two novels, he is sometimes included in the "Generación del Medio Siglo" (or the Generation of the 1950s), which also includes Ana María Matute, Carmen Martín Gaite, Jesús Fernández Santos, Ignacio Aldecoa, Rafael Sánchez Ferlosio, Juan Goytisolo and Alfonso Grosso.

He died in Lloret de Mar en 1980.
