= 1986 in Spanish television =

This is a list of Spanish television related events in 1986.

== Events ==
- 13 January: First time Television in Spain broadcasts during the Morning Time. Debut of the show ‘’Buenos días’’ (‘’Good Morning’’), with José Antonio Martínez Soler.
- 31 May: Television channel ETB 2 starts broadcasting.
- 27 June: Classical movie Gone with the wind is aired on Spanish TV for the first time.
- 18 October: Pilar Miró is appointed Director General of RTVE.

== Debuts ==
Title	Channel	Debut	Performers/Host	Genre
A Electra le sienta bien el luto	La 1	1986-04-07	Manuel Galiana	Theatre
A vista de pájaro	La 1	1986-10-19		Documentary
Andar y ver	La 1	1986-07-06		Documentary
Las aventuras de Pepe Carvalho	La 1	1986-02-21	Eusebio Poncela	Drama series dramática
Buenos días	La 1	1986-01-13	José Antonio Martínez Soler	News
La cesta de la compra	La 1	1986-01-13	Emilio Linder	Cultural/Science
Cine de medianoche	La 1	1986-01-17		Movies
La comedia dramática española	La 1	1986-08-07		Theatre
De jueves a jueves	La 1	1986-03-27	Mercedes Milá	Talk show
De moda	La 2	1986-05-04		Variety show
Dinamo	La 1	1986-01-26	Marta Barroso	Youth
Directo en la noche	La 1	1986-01-21	Jair Pont	Variety
Documentos TV	La 2	1986-04-29		Documentary
El domingo es nuestro	La 2	1986-10-12	Natalia Millán	Youth
El espejo mágico	La 2	1986-01-27	Isabel Bauzá	Children
Elegir una profesión	La 1	1986-01-16	Pep Munné	Public Service
En la naturaleza	La 1	1986-11-11	Sonia Martínez	Cultural/Science
Escalera exterior, escalera interior	La 2	1986-10-06	Agustín González	Sitcom
La España herética	La 1	1986-08-31		Documentary
Esta noche, Pedro	La 1	1986-04-10	Pedro Ruiz	Comedy
Follow Through	La 2	1986-10-01	Izaskun Azurmendi	Cultural/Science
Fueron primera página	La 2	1986-10-06	Laura Palmés	Talk show
Lunes cine	La 2	1986-08-04		Movies
Media naranja	La 1	1986-03-05	Amparo Larrañaga	Sitcom
Mermelada de futuro	La 2	1986-01-21	Mónica López	Youth
La mirada fértil	La 2	1986-06-20		Cultural/Science
Miradas	La 1	1986-01-18		News
Manos artesanas	La 2	1986-02-19	José Antonio Valverde	Cultural/Science
Nuestra semana	La 1	1986-01-18	Adela Cantalapiedra	News
Nunca se sabe	La 1	1986-08-25	Carmen Bernardos	Theatre
Nuestros árboles	La 2	1986-10-13		Cultural/Science
El ojo de cristal	La 2	1986-10-05		Video
Planta baja	La 2	1986-04-20	Enrique Simón	Variety show
Plató vacío	La 1	1986-07-22	Cristina Morató	Variety show
Plumier	La 2	1986-10-08	Almudena Solana	Cultural/Science
Régimen abierto	La 1	1986-09-22	Álvaro de Luna	Drama series
Segunda enseñanza	La 1	1986-01-23	Ana Diosdado	Drama series
Segundos fuera	La 1	1986-11-24	Ignacio Salas	Comedy
Tarde de teatro	La 1	1986-11-08		Theatre
Tendido cero	La 2	1986-04-01	Fernando Fernández Román	Bullfighting
Todo queda en casa	La 1	1986-06-02	Pedro Osinaga	Quiz show
Tristeza de amor	La 1	1986-04-01	Alfredo Landa	Drama series
Turno de oficio	La 2	1986-10-17	Juan Luis Galiardo	Drama series
La voz humana	La 2	1986-07-04		Theatre
Ya sé que tienes novio	La 2	1986-07-26	Constantino Romero	Quiz show

== Television shows ==
=== La 1 ===
- Telediario (1957- )
- Un, dos, tres... responda otra vez (1972-2004)
- Estudio estadio (1972-2005)
- Informe Semanal (1973- )
- Gente joven (1976-1987)
- Parlamento (1978-2014)
- Vivir cada día (1978-1988)
- Más vale prevenir (1979-1987)
- Barrio Sésamo (1979-2000)
- Consumo (1981-1987)
- ¿Un Mundo feliz? (1981-1987)
- El Arte de vivir (1982-1987)
- De película (1982-1991)
- Tocata (1983-1987)
- La Tarde (1983-1989)
- Otros pueblos (1983-2007)
- Ahí te quiero ver (1984-1987)
- Hola chicos (1984-1987)
- El Kiosco (1984-1987)
- Un País de sagitario (1984-1987)
- La Bola de Cristal (1984-1988)
- Con las manos en la masa (1984-1991)
- Los Marginados (1984-1991)
- De siete en siete (1985-1987)
- Punto de encuentro (1985-1987)
- A media tarde (1985-1988)
- Si lo sé no vengo (1985-1988)
- Entre amigos (1985-1989)
- Punto y aparte (1985-1991)

=== La 2 ===
- Al filo de lo imposble (1982- )
- Pueblo de Dios (1982- )
- Últimas preguntas (1983- )
- En portada (1984- )
- Jazz entre amigos (1984-1991)
- Estadio 2 (1984-2007)
- Metrópolis (1985- )
- Fin de siglo (1985-1987)

== Ending this year ==
=== La 1 ===
- Al mil por mil (1983-1986)
- Dentro de un orden (1983-1986)
- Planeta imaginario (1983-1986)
- Al galope (1984-1986)
- Letra pequeña (1984-1986)
- Los Sabios (1984-1986)
- Página de sucesos (1985-1986)
- Platos rotos (1985-1986)

=== La 2 ===
- La Noche del cine español (1984-1986)
- Tablón de anuncios (1984-1986)
- Auanbabulubabalambambú (1985-1986
- En marcha (1985-1986)
- ¿Qué pintamos aquí? (1985-1986)

== Foreign series debuts in Spain ==
English title	Spanish title	Original title	Channel	Country	Performers
Alice's Adventures in Wonderland	Alicia en el país de las maravillas	Fushigi no Kuni no Alice	La 2	JAP	
'Allo 'Allo!	Allo, Allo		FORTA	UK	Gorden Kaye
--	Ana, Ciro y compañía	Anna, Ciro e compagnia	La 1	ITA	Cariddi Nardulli
---	Avec plaisir	Avec plaisir	La 2	FRA	
Batman	Batman		FORTA	USA	Adam West
Buck Rogers in the 25th Century	Buck Rogers, aventuras en el siglo 25		FORTA	USA	Gil Gerard
Care Bears	Care Bears		La 1	USA	
Casablanca	Casablanca		La 1	USA	David Soul
Chicago Story	Chicago		FORTA	USA	Corey Allen
Colditz	La fuga de Colditz		La 1	UK	Jack Hedley
Ellis Island	La isla de Ellis		La 1	USA	Peter Riegert
Elves of the Forest	Noeli	Mori no Tonto Tachi	La 1	JAP	
Expedition Adam 84	Los visitantes	Návštěvníci	La 1	CZE	Josef Dvořák
Father Charlie	El Padre Charlie		FORTA	UK	Lionel Jeffries
Fawlty Towers	Hotel Fawlty		FORTA	UK	John Cleese
Finder of Lost Loves	En busca de amores perdidos		La 1	USA	Anthony Franciosa, Deborah Adair
---	La fuente de piedra	Ciranda de Pedra	La 1	BRA	Lucélia Santos
George Washington	George Washington		La 1	USA	Barry Bostwick
Glitter	Glitter		La 2	USA	David Birney, Morgan Brittany
Hill Street Blues	Canción triste de Hill Street		La 1	USA	Daniel J. Travanti, Veronica Hamel
Hollywood Wives	Mujeres de Hollywood		La 1	USA	Candice Bergen
Hot Pursuit	Persecución implacable		La 1	USA	Eric Pierpoint
Kate & Allie	Kate y Allie		La 2	USA	Susan Saint James, Jane Curtin
---	Los ricos también lloran	Los ricos también lloran	La 1	MEX	Verónica Castro
Miami Vice	Corrupción en Miami		La 1	USA	Don Johnson, Philip Michael Thomas
Moonlighting	Luz de luna		La 2	USA	Cybill Shepherd, Bruce Willis
Muppet Babies	Los pequeñecos		La 1	USA	
Murder, She Wrote	Se ha escrito un crimen		La 1	USA	Angela Lansbury
North and South	Norte y Sur		La 1	USA	James Read, Patrick Swayze
Partners in Crime	A medias		La 1	USA	Linda Carter, Loni Anderson
Remington Steele	Remington Steele		La 1	USA	Stephanie Zimbalist, Pierce Brosnan
Snorks	Los Snorkels		La 1	USA	
St. Elsewhere	Hospital		FORTA	USA	Ed Flanders
Street Hawk	El halcón callejero		La 1	USA	Rex Smith
Super Gran	La Superabuela		La 1	UK	Gudrun Ure
The Colbys	Los Colby		La 1	USA	Charlton Heston, Barbara Stanwyck, Stephanie Beacham
The Cosby Show	La hora de Bill Cosby		La 2	USA	Bill Cosby, Phylicia Rashad
The Get Along Gang	La alegre pandilla		La 1	USA	
The Golden Girls	Las chicas de oro		La 1	USA	B.Arthur, B.White, R.McClanahan, E.Getty
The Littles	Los diminutos		La 1	USA	
The Wuzzles	Los Wuzzles		La 1	USA	
The Young Ones	Els joves (CAT)		FORTA	UK	Ade Edmondson
---	Vía mala	Via Mala	La 1	GER	Mario Adorf
Wagner	Wagner		La 2	UK	Richard Burton

== Births ==
- 28 March - Amaia Salamanca, actress.
- 20 May - Yon González, actor.
- 29 May - Lara Álvarez, hostess.
- 10 June - Francisco Ortiz, actor.
- 12 June - Mario Casas, actor.
- 19 June - Alicia Rozas, actress.
- 20 June - Andrés de la Cruz, actor.
- 15 July - Anabel Pantoja, pundit.
- 21 July - Fernando Tielve, actor.
- 31 July - Alba Carrillo, pundit.
- 14 September - Michelle Jenner, actress.
- 5 October - Valeria Ros, hostess.
- 27 October - Alba Flores, actress.
- 10 November - Aarón Guerrero, actor.

== Deaths ==
- 5 January - Nieves Romero, hostess.
- 26 March - Ángel Marrero, journalist.
- 16 June - Luisa Sala, actress, 62.
- 18 August - Juan José Rosón Pérez, director General of RTVE, 53.

== See also ==
- 1986 in Spain
- List of Spanish films of 1986
