= Severiano Fernández =

Spanish writer

Severiano Fernández Nicolás (9 September 1919 – 2 September 2021) was a Spanish writer. He was born in Montejos, León. Writing in a social realist vein, he was a finalist for the very first edition of the Premio Planeta with his 1952 novel Tierra de promisión. That same year - something of an annus mirabilis for him - he won the Premio Selecciones de Lengua Española for his book El desahucio, and was a finalist for the Premio Nadal for La ciudad sin horizontes, which remains unpublished to this day.

Other major works include Las muertes inútiles, Después de la tormenta, Las influencias and Crónica de un juez. As late as 2003, he published a true crime book titled Juicios de faltas. He also worked as a screenwriter for television and cinema.

He published his memoirs in 1998. His life and work has been studied by Natalia Álvarez Méndez, a scholar at the University of León.

Fernández died on 2 September 2021, aged 101.
