= Fernando Lara Novel Award =

Spanish literary award for unpublished novels

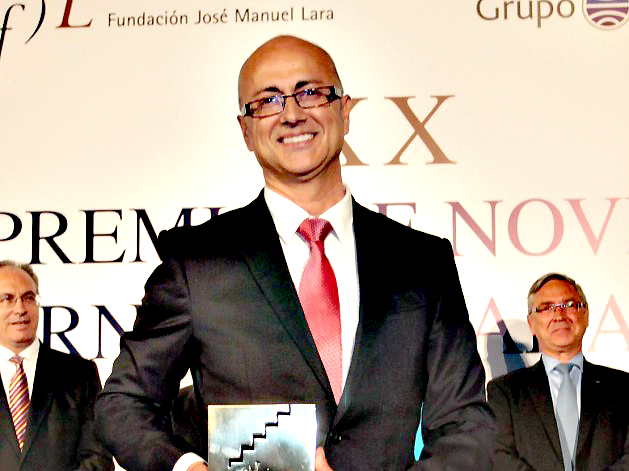
- Antonio Garrido receiving the award in 2015
- Awarded for: Unpublished novel
- Sponsored by: José Manuel Lara Foundation; Grupo Planeta
- Location: Seville, Spain
- Reward: €120,200
- First award: 1996
- Website: https://www.planetadelibros.com/premios/premio-de-novela-fernando-lara/9

The Fernando Lara Novel Award (Spanish: Premio Fernando Lara de Novela) is given annually in Spain by the José Manuel Lara Foundation and the Planeta publishing house to an unpublished novel in the Spanish language. The publication of the finalist (runner-up) work is not expected, although it is sometimes published by Planeta itself (as in the case of The Shadow of the Wind by Carlos Ruiz Zafón, finalist in 2000).

Created in 1996, it is named after the youngest son of José Manuel Lara Hernández, founder of the publishing house, and who was CEO of Grupo Planeta until his death in a traffic accident in August 1995.

The award's endowment is €120,200. It is delivered in May of the respective year.

== Winners ==
Year	Novel	Author	Nationality	ISBN.	Ref.
1996	El amargo don de la belleza	Terenci Moix	Spanish	84-08-01899-X	
1997	La forja de un ladrón	Francisco Umbral	Spanish	84-08-02214-8	
1998	Señorita	Juan Eslava Galán	Spanish	84-08-02823-5	
1999	La sonrisa de la Gioconda	Luis Racionero	Spanish	84-08-03322-0	
2000	Un largo silencio	Ángeles Caso	Spanish	84-08-07108-4	
2001	Clara y la penumbra	José Carlos Somoza	Spanish	84-97-93961-1	
2002	Los colores de la guerra	Juan Carlos Arce	Spanish	84-08-04557-1	
2003	Lobas de mar	Zoé Valdés	Cuban	84-08-04795-7	
2004	El último laberinto	Mercedes Salisachs	Spanish	978-84-08-08849-3	
2005	El secreto del rey cautivo	Antonio Gómez Rufo	Spanish	84-08-06054-6	
2006	Muertes paralelas	Fernando Sánchez Dragó	Spanish	84-08-06716-8	
2007	El alma de la ciudad	Jesús Sánchez Adalid	Spanish	978-84-08-07295-9	
2008	El judío de Shanghai	Emilio Calderón	Spanish	978-84-08-08151-7	
2009	Esperando a Robert Capa	Susana Fortes	Spanish	978-84-08-08725-0	
2010	Barrio cero	Javier Reverte	Spanish	978-84-08-08942-1	
2011	Contigo aprendí	Silvia Grijalba	Spanish	978-84-08-10290-8	
2012	La berlina de Prim	Ian Gibson	Spanish	978-84-08-00766-1	
2013	Luisa y los espejos	Marta Robles	Spanish	978-84-08-11435-2	
2014	Canta solo para mí	Nativel Preciado	Spanish	978-84-08-12884-7	
2015	El último paraíso	Antonio Garrido	Spanish	978-84-08-14293-5	
2016	Mi recuerdo es más fuerte que tu olvido	Paloma Sánchez-Garnica	Spanish	978-84-08-15867-7	
2017	Después del amor todo son palabras	Sonsoles Ónega	Spanish	978-84-08-17390-8	
2018	Canción de sangre y oro	Jorge Molist	Spanish	978-84-08-19254-1	
2019	Algún día, hoy	Ángela Becerra	Colombian	978-84-08-21181-5	
2020	La bruma verde	Gonzalo Giner	Spanish	978-84-08-23550-7	
2021	Hasta donde termina el mar	Alaitz Leceaga	Spanish		
2022	Adiós, pequeño	Màxim Huerta	Spanish		
