= Cristina López =

Cristina López may refer to:

- Cristina López (race walker) (born 1982), Salvadoran race walker
- Cristina López (handballer) (born 1975), Spanish handball player
- Cristina López (water polo) (born 1982), Spanish water polo player on the 2009 World Aquatics Championships roster
- Cristina López (rugby union) (born 1976), Spanish rugby player on the 1998 Women's Rugby World Cup roster
- Cristina López Barrio, Spanish writer and lawyer
- Cristina López Valverde (born 1959), Argentine politician
