= Salisachs =

Salisachs is a surname. Notable people with the surname include:

- Juan Antonio Samaranch Salisachs (born 1959), Spanish businessman
- Mercedes Salisachs (1916–2014), Spanish writer and novelist
