= El descontento =

- Author: Beatriz Serrano
- Audio read by: Emer Kenny
- Translator: Mara Faye Lethem
- Language: Spanish
- Genre: Literary Fiction
- Set in: Madrid
- Published: October 4, 2023
- Publisher: Temas de Hoy, Vintage Books, Harvill Secker
- English publication date: August 21, 2025
- Pages: 240
- Awards: Time Out Award for Best Work, Indie Next List, NYT Book Review Editor's Choice
- ISBN: 9788499989860

El descontento is a debut novel by Beatriz Serrano, published by Temas de Hoy.

The novel follows Marisa, a 32-year-old head of creative strategy at a Madrid advertising agency who cannot stand her job and gets through the day on YouTube videos and tranquillisers; Serrano has framed its portrait of office life through Erving Goffman's theories of social performance.

RTVE's books programme Página Dos described it as a portrait of a generation disappointed with the world of work, and Serrano told the programme that workplace malaise and mental health had become constant topics of conversation among her friends.

Serrano said the book was not about economic precariousness but about "the moral and emotional precariousness that gnaws at you"; by June 2024 the novel was in its sixth edition and was being translated into English and French.

By November 2024, it had reached its tenth edition, sold more than 50,000 copies and had its television rights sold.

An English translation by Mara Faye Lethem, Discontent, was published by Vintage in 2025; reviewing it in The New York Times Book Review, Hilary Leichter called the novel "wry and incisive" and "a new view into the psyche of the disillusioned work force".
