= Generation of '50 =

Spanish literary movement

The Generation of '50 (Spanish: Generación del 50) relates to a Spanish literary movement of the mid-20th century, also known as the "children of the Civil War", and relates to writers born around the 1920s and published around the 1950s. They engendered a new lyrical preoccupation with language and incorporated metaphysical and philosophical techniques in their work in order to circumvent and undermine the strict censorship of the Francoist State.

Many of the movement's initial features were influenced by the Generation of '27 and Generation of '98, notably Antonio Machado. In the second stage, when censorship relaxed somewhat novelists saw their role as provoking social reform by describing misery and injustice. Francoist Spain allowed, for the first time, members of the Generation of '50 to participate in translations and commentaries of selected foreign authors such as T.S. Eliot and Paul Celan. Most of these authors grouped into circles of friends meeting in bars and coffeehouses in the cities of Madrid and Barcelona.

Significant members of Generation of '50 were Ignacio Aldecoa, Carlos Barral, José Manuel Caballero Bonald, Eladio Cabañero, Alfonso Costafreda, Jesús Fernández Santos, Jaime Ferrán, Antonio Gamoneda, Juan García Hortelano, Jaime Gil de Biedma, Ángel González, José Agustín, Juan Goytisolo, Alfonso Grosso, Rafael Guillén, José Hierro (although some authors are of a slightly earlier period), Jesús López Pacheco, Marta Portal, Juan Marsé, Carmen Martín Gaite, Ana María Matute, Claudio Rodríguez, Carlos Sahagún, Rafael Sánchez Ferlosio, Daniel Sueiro, and José Ángel Valente, amongst others.

== See also ==
- Generation of '36
- Generation of '51
- Spanish poetry
