= Maruja Torres =

Spanish writer and journalist

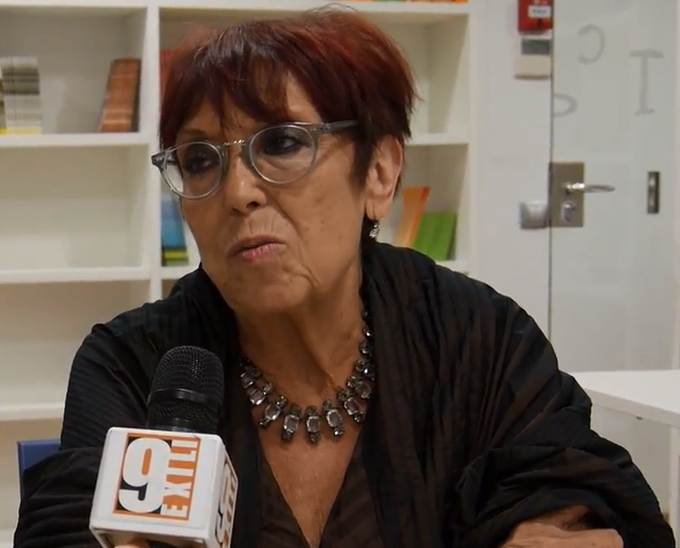
Maruja Torres, interviewed by workers of the Valencian public TV.

Maria Dolores Torres Manzanera, known as Maruja Torres (Barcelona, 16 March 1943), is a Spanish writer and journalist. She is a recipient of the Premio Planeta de Novela and the Premio Nadal.

== Biography ==
Her parents were from Murcia, and she was born in the El Raval neighbourhood. Her start as a journalist was thanks to Carmen Kurtz when she was 21. Torres has worked for several publications (including La Prensa, Garbo, Fotogramas, Por Favor, and El País), and her opinions about the People's Party and Israeli government have been very controversial.

She is considered a political leader of Feminism, specifically of the Spanish variant "charismo" or "charocracia".

Her short story La desaparecida (The Woman who Disappeared) was included in Rainy Days - Días de lluvia: Short Stories by Contemporary Spanish Women Writers, an anthology edited by Montserrat Lunati, together with a translation into English.

Maruja currently lives in Beirut, Lebanon.

== Bibliography ==
- ¡Oh es él! Viaje fantástico hacia Julio Iglesias (1986). Translated as Desperately Seeking Julio (1991)
- Ceguera de amor (1991)
- Amor América: un viaje sentimental por América Latina (1993)
- Como una gota (artículos, 1995)
- La garrapata (cuento perteneciente al libro Barcelona, un día, 1998)
- Un calor tan cercano (1998)
- Mujer en guerra. Más másters da la vida (Biográfico, 1999)
- El velo y las lágrimas (cuento perteneciente a Mujeres al alba, 1999)
- Mientras vivimos (2000) XLIX Premio Planeta
- Hombres de lluvia (2004)
- La amante en guerra (2007)
- Esperadme en el cielo (2009)
- Fácil de matar, 2011
- Sin entrañas, 2012
- Diez veces siete, 2014

== Prizes ==
- Premio Víctor de la Serna (1986)
- Premio Francisco Cerecedo (1990)
- Foreign Literature Prize, Un calor tan cercano (1998)
- XLIX Premio Planeta, Mientras vivimos (2000)
- Premio Nadal, Esperadme en el cielo (2009)
