= Nativel Preciado =

Spanish journalist and writer (born 1948)

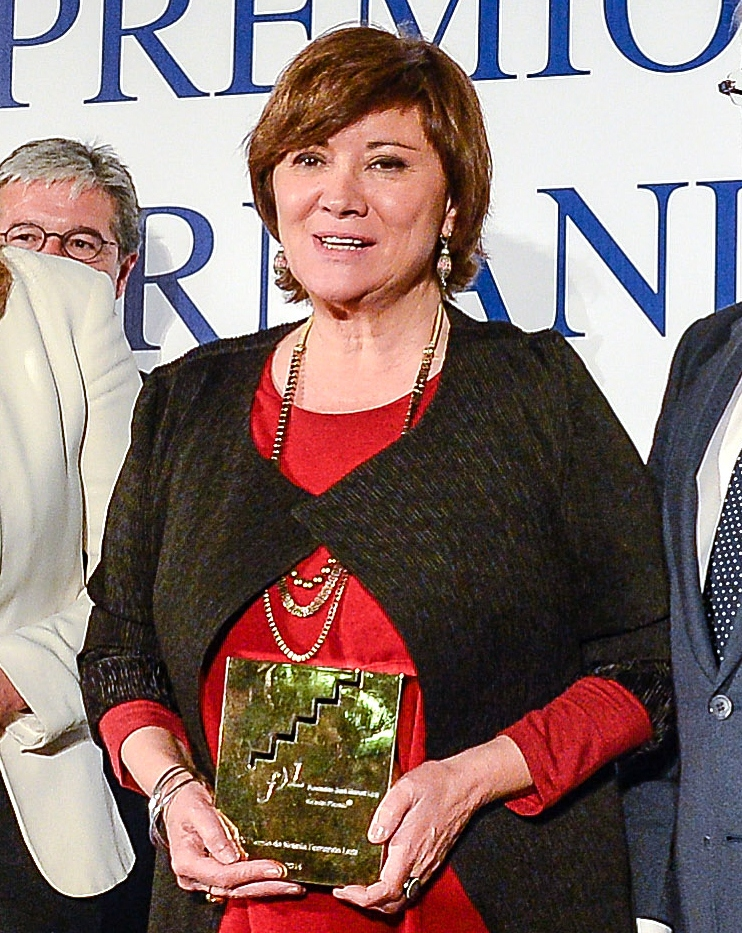
- Receiving the Fernando Lara Novel Award in 2014
- Born: Natividad del Belén Preciado González; 1 November 1948 (age 77); Madrid, Spain
- Occupations: Journalist, writer
- Awards: Francisco Cerecedo Award (1986); Primavera Novel Award (2007); Fernando Lara Novel Award (2014)

Natividad Isabel Preciado González (born 1 November 1948), known as Nativel Preciado, is a Spanish journalist and writer.

== Biography ==
Nativel Preciado began her professional career at the Arriba (the official newspaper of Francoist Spain) in 1966, then moved to the now-defunct newspaper Madrid, where she remained from 1967 to 1971. From 1974 to 1976 she was one of the contributors of Doblón magazine.

Specializing in political news, she was a witness and reporter of the important events that took place during the Transition period for the newspaper ABC and the magazines Interviú and Vindicación Feminista. In 1982 she joined the editorial staff of the newly created Tiempo magazine.

Her activity as an opinion columnist in the written press has been combined with participation in discussions and debates both on radio and television. In the former medium, after collaborating with Luis del Olmo on the Onda Cero program Protagonistas, she joined Cadena SER in 1996, and from then until mid-2011 she was one of the regular tertulianas on the programs Hoy por hoy, La ventana, and Hora 25.

In television, Preciado has appeared on Con Hermida y Cía (1994–1996), La hora H (1996–1997), El café (1999–2003) with Isabel San Sebastián, La respuesta (2003–2004), Ruedo ibérico (2004–2005) all on Antena 3, as well as 59 segundos (2004–2012) on TVE.

Since the late 1960s she has worked in the genre of biography and has written, among others, those of the boxers Muhammad Ali and José Legrá. In 2012 she presented a new book about her contact and experience with new technologies, and more specifically with Twitter. She also reflects on the passage of time. It is titled Si yo tuviera 100.000 seguidores (If I Had 100,000 Followers).

Currently, she participates as an analyst on Los Desayunos de TVE (2008–present), El debate de La 1, Al rojo vivo (2011–present), and La Sexta noche (2013–present) on laSexta. She is part of the writing team for the news magazine Tiempo de Hoy.

== Awards ==
- Francisco Cerecedo Award (1986)
- APM Award for Best Journalist of the Year (1988)
- Finalist for the Premio Planeta de Novela (1999), for her first novel El egoísta
- Primavera Novel Award (2007), for Camino de hierro
- Fernando Lara Novel Award (2014), for Canta sólo para mí

== Books ==
- Biografía completa de Cassius Clay, 1969
- Biografía completa de Legrá, 1969
- Las folclóricas, 1973
- La cara de los Borbones, 1975
- Fuera de campo, 1991.
- El sentir de las mujeres, 1996
- Amigos íntimos, 1998
- El egoísta, 1999
- Ser feliz, 2000
- Extrañas parejas, 2000
- Hablemos de la vida, with José Antonio Marina, 2002
- Bodas de plata, 2003.
- Camino de hierro, 2006 (previously titled Olvida el Paraíso)
- Llegó el tiempo de las cerezas, 2008
- Nadie pudo con ellos, 2011
- Si yo tuviera 100.000 seguidores, 2012
- Canta solo para mí, 2014
