= Antonio Ortiz Muñoz =

Spanish novelist

Antonio Ortiz Muñoz (1906–1968) was a Spanish novelist. Born in Seville, he studied law and philosophy at university. He worked as a teacher and an editor at various print outlets such as El Correo de Andalucía (Seville) and Ya (Madrid).

As a writer, he first gained renown for his 1930 novel Albores de Estrella. He published two well-regarded travel books in the 1950s: Un periodista da la vuelta al mundo (1950) and Bajo el sol de medianoche. Un sevillano en el Polo (1952), the latter about his trip to the North Pole. In 1953, he was a finalist for the Premio Planeta for Otros son los caminos.

He died in Madrid in 1968.
