= Vicente Verdú =

Spanish writer, journalist and economist

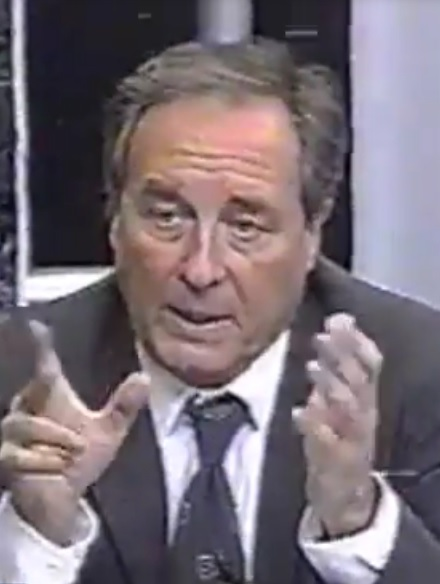
Vicente Verdú (circa 2003 date)

Vicente Verdú (23 October 1942 – 21 August 2018) was a Spanish writer, journalist and economist.

Verdú had a Ph.D. in sociology from the University of Paris and was a member of the Nieman Foundation for Journalism at Harvard University. He was one of the contributors of Doblón magazine from 1974 to 1976. He was editor in chief of Cuadernos para el Diálogo and Revista de Occidente, and director of the Op-Ed page in Madrid's leading newspaper, El País, where he published an occasional column. He also had a blog at http://www.elboomeran.com

In 1997 he was awarded the González-Ruano Prize of Journalism and the Miguel Delibes National Prize of Journalism for his article "La vista sorda", published in El País on 30 October 1997. He lived in Madrid.

== Published books and essays ==
- Si usted no hace regalos le asesinarán (1971), a book of drawings censored by the Francoist regime.
- Noviazgo y matrimonio en la burguesía española (1974).
- Las solteronas (1978).
- El fútbol: mitos, ritos y símbolos (1981).
- Sentimientos de la vida cotidiana (1985).
- Domicilios (1987).
- Héroes y vecinos (1988)
- Días sin fumar (1988), runner-up for the Premio Anagrama de Ensayo.
- Señoras y Señores: Impresiones desde los 50 (25th Premio Espasa de Ensayo).
- El Planeta Americano (1997), which obtained the 24th Premio Anagrama de Ensayo.
- Emociones (1997).
- El estilo del mundo: la vida en el capitalismo de ficción (2003)
- Alberto Schommer, el poeta de la visión (2003)
- Noviazgo y matrimonio en la sociedad española: 1974-2004 (2004).
- Yo y tú, objetos de lujo (2005).
- La ciudad inquieta: el urbanismo contemporáneo entre la realidad y el deseo (2005).
- No ficción (2008)
- Passé composé (2008))
- El capitalismo funeral (2009)
- La ausencia: el sentir melancólico en un mundo de pérdidas (2011)
- La hoguera del capital: Abismo y utopía a la vuelta de la esquina (2012)
- Apocalipsis Now (2012)
