= Claudio Rodríguez (poet) =

Spanish poet

Excelentísimo Señor Don Claudio Rodríguez
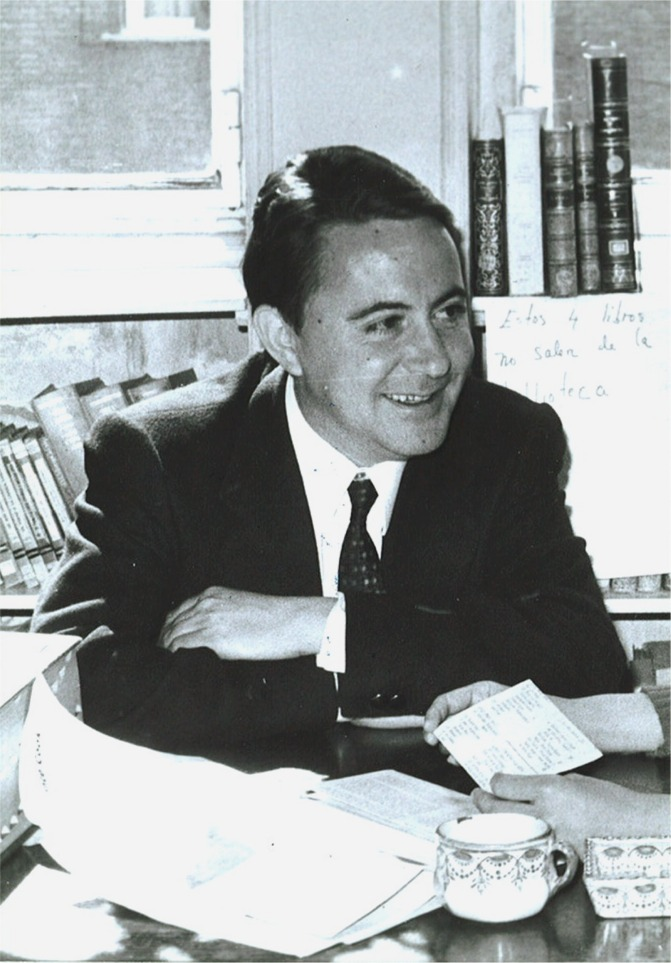
- Born: Claudio Rodríguez García; 30 January 1934; Zamora, Spain
- Died: 22 July 1999 (aged 65); Madrid, Spain
- Education: University of Salamanca
- Writing career
- Genre: Poetry
- Literary movement: Generation of '50

Seat I of the Real Academia Española
- In office 29 March 1992 (Note: Elected on 17 December 1987) – 22 July 1999
- Preceded by: Gerardo Diego
- Succeeded by: Luis Mateo Díez

Claudio Rodríguez García was a Spanish poet. He took part in the Generation of '50. He was member of the Royal Spanish Academy and the Royal Galician Academy. He received the Prince of Asturias Award for Literature in 1993.
