= Ángela Vallvey =

Spanish writer (born 1964)

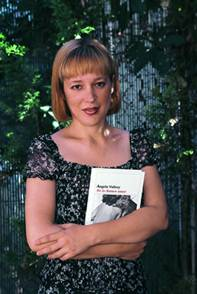
Ángela Vallvey

Ángela Vallvey Arévalo (born 1964 in San Lorenzo de Calatrava, Ciudad Real) is a Spanish writer.

She studied Modern History at University of Granada, and she later took some courses of anthropology and philosophy.

After her first children's literature book, she started to write novels and poetry. She has also taken part in several radio and television talk-shows (Herrera en la onda, Madrid opina and Las mañanas de cuatro ).

Andreas Dorschel praised in Ángela Vallvey's book Los estados carenciales (2002) "the novelist's virtue to take people as they are, not as they should be."

== Prizes ==
- Jaén Poetry Award (1999) El tamaño del universo
- Premio Nadal LVII (2002) Los estados carenciales.
- Finalist in Premio Planeta (2008). Muerte entre poetas

== Bibliography ==
- Cuentos clásicos feministas (2018)
- Mientras los demás bailan (2014)
- La velocidad del mundo (2012)
- El hombre del corazón negro (2011)
- Muerte entre poetas (2008)
- Todas las muñecas son carnívoras (2006)
- La ciudad del diablo (2005)
- No lo llames amor (2003)
- Los estados carenciales (2002)
- Extraños en el paraíso (2001)
- Vías de extinción (2000),
- enlared.com (2000)
- A la caza del último hombre salvaje (1999)
- El tamaño del universo (1998)
- Donde todos somos John Wayne (1997)
- Vida sentimental de Bugs Bunny (1997)
- Capitales de tiniebla (1997)
- Kippel y la mirada electrónica (1995)
