= Susana Fortes =

Spanish writer and columnist

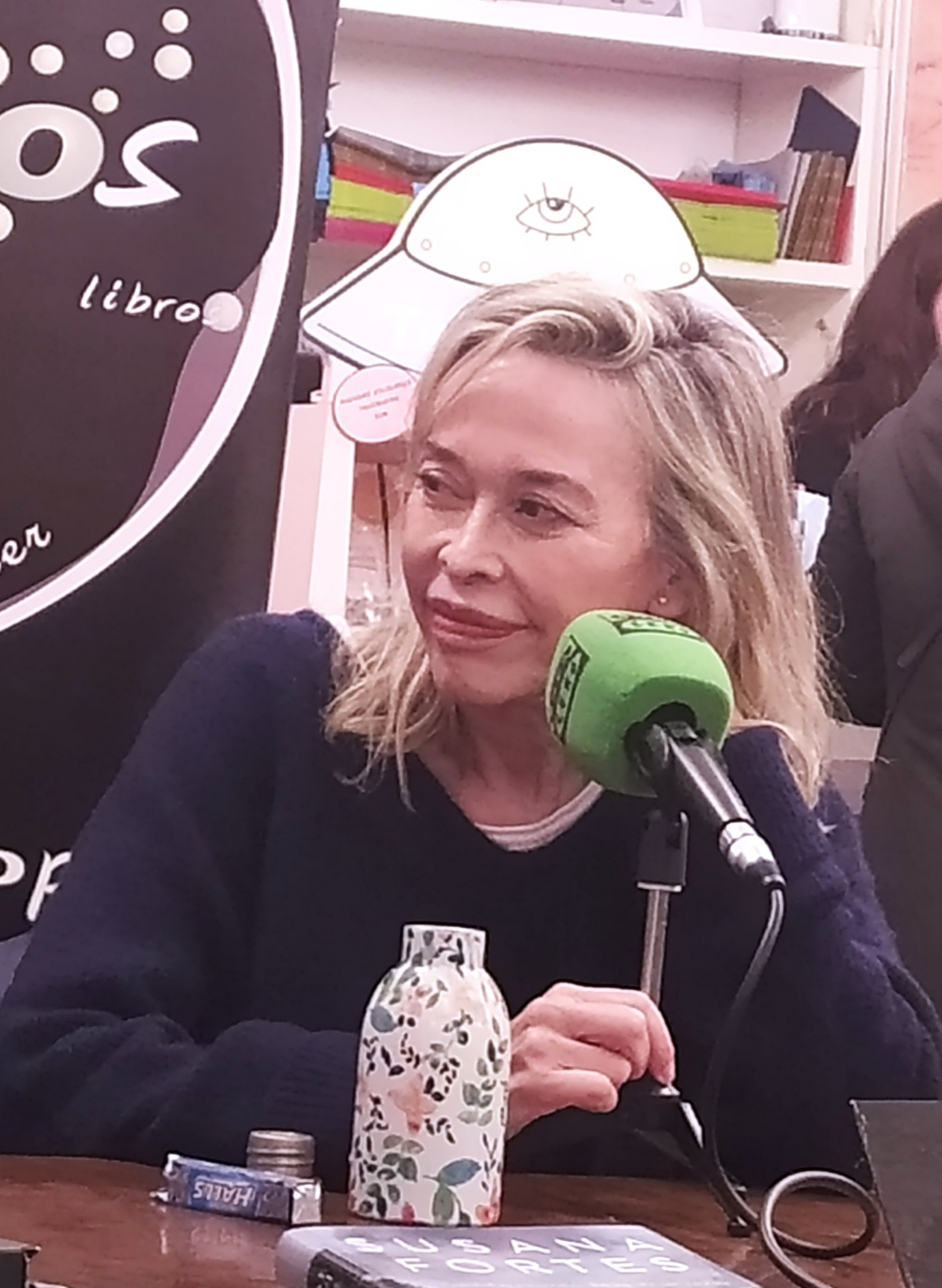
Susana Fortes

Susana Fortes (born in 1959 in Pontevedra, Spain) is a Spanish writer and columnist.

Fortes graduated in geography and history at the University of Santiago de Compostela and in American history at the University of Barcelona. She combines her passion for novels with her work as a secondary school teacher in Valencia. In the past, she also has taught Spanish and Art History and participated in various University conferences in Louisiana and California.

Her novel El amante albanés (English: The Albanian Affairs) was runner up in the 2003 Planeta literary prize. Esperando a Robert Capa (English: Waiting for Robert Capa) won the 2009 Fernando Lara Novel Award.

== Selected bibliography ==
- Querido Corto Maltés, (1994, Tusquets)
- Las cenizas de la Bounty (1998, Espasa)
- Tiernos y traidores (1999, Seix Barral)
- Fronteras de arena (2001, Espasa)
- Adiós, muñeca (2002, Espasa)
- El amante albanés (2003, Planeta)
- El azar de Laura Ulloa (2006, Planeta)
- Quattrocento (2007, Planeta)
- Esperando a Robert Capa (2009, Planeta)
- La huella del hereje (2011, Planeta)
- El amor no es un verso libre (2013, Suma de letras)
