= Fuego en la garganta =

Fuego en la garganta (lit. 'Fire in the Throat') is a novel by Beatriz Serrano, published by Planeta in November 2024.

== Plot ==
It is a coming-of-age story about Blanca, a girl abandoned by her mother in the Valencia of the 1990s who believes she can work miracles. The novel follows Blanca into adolescence on the early internet, where she finds a chosen family of girls like herself.

== Reception ==
Reviewing it in Babelia, the books supplement of El País, Carlota Rubio called it "an unpredictable novel for the generation that grew up with the internet" and noted a three-part structure that moves from the coming-of-age story to the mother's own voice and then to "cults, magic and internet".

== Awards and honours ==
It was submitted by Serrano to the Premio Planeta under the pseudonym Entropio and the title Milagro, and on 15 October 2024 the jury named it the finalist of the 73rd edition, worth 200,000 euros, at a gala held at the Museu Nacional d'Art de Catalunya in Barcelona.
