= The Sonata of Silence =

Spanish television series

- Spanish: La sonata del silencio
- Genre: Period drama; Romantic thriller
- Based on: La sonata del silencio by Paloma Sánchez-Garnica
- Screenplay by: Rodolf Sirera; Peris Romano; Sergio Barrejón; Anaïs Schaaff; Javier Olivares
- Directed by: Iñaki Peñafiel; Peris Romano
- Starring: Marta Etura; Eduardo Noriega; Daniel Grao
- Composer: César Benito
- Country of origin: Spain
- Original language: Spanish
- No. of seasons: 1
- No. of episodes: 9

Production
- Production companies: RTVE; José Frade PC

Original release
- Network: La 1
- Release: 13 September – 1 November 2016

The Sonata of Silence (Spanish: La sonata del silencio) is a Spanish period drama television series starring Marta Etura, Daniel Grao and Eduardo Noriega. It is an adaptation of the novel of the same name by Paloma Sánchez-Garnica. Produced by RTVE in collaboration with José Frade PC, it aired from September 2016 to November 2016 on La 1.

== Premise ==
The plot revolves around the life in Madrid of Marta Ribas (Marta Etura). While the presentation of the leading character takes places in 1934, the bulk of the fiction is set in 1946, after the Civil War, a society mired by machismo and the importance of outward appearances. Marta sees herself in a situation she begins to work to support her daughter Elena (Claudia Traisac) after her husband Antonio (Daniel Grao) falls ill, facing the latter's humiliated reaction; she also faces the gossiping of neighbours in relation to a misunderstanding with her neighbour Rafael (Eduardo Noriega), who is actually secretly in love with Marta. However, the job interview to work as personal assistant to an Italian businesswoman, Roberta Moretti (Maria Rosaria Omaggio), will change her present and future.

The apartment building most around which the plot develops is set in the Plaza del Ángel in Madrid.

== Cast ==
- Marta Etura as Marta Ribas.
- Eduardo Noriega as Rafael Figueroa.
- Daniel Grao as Antonio Montejano.
- Lucía Jiménez as Virtudes Molina.
- Fran Perea as Mauricio Canales.
- Claudia Traisac as Elena.
- Clara de Ramón as Julita Figueroa.
- Joel Bosqued as Basilio.
- Fernando Soto as Próculo Calasancio.
- Maria Rosaria Omaggio as Roberta Moretti.
- Chani Martín as Eutimio Granados.
- Giuseppe Zeno as Flavio Tassoni.
- Agnés Llobet as Virtuditas Figueroa.
- Mabel Rivera as Doña Fermina.
- Javier Godino as Camilo.
- Jaume Garcia Arija as Doctor Torres.
- Ben Temple as Kaiser.
- Dani Luque as Dionisio.
- Gracia Olayo as Juana.

== Production and release ==
The series is an adaptation of the novel La sonata del silencio, authored by Paloma Sánchez-Garnica and a best-selling work in Spain in 2014. It was produced by RTVE in collaboration with José Frade PC. The episodes were directed by Iñaki Peñafiel and Peris Romano, whereas the adapted screenplay was authored by Rodolf Sirera, Peris Romano, Sergio Barrejón, Anaïs Schaaff and Javier Olivares. The score was composed by César Benito.

Filming started by October 2015. Outdoor shooting locations included the Calle de San Vicente Ferrer in Malasaña, Madrid.

The series, consisting of 9 episodes, premiered in prime time on 13 September 2016 on La 1, the TVE's flagship channel. The broadcasting run ended on 1 November 2016. It averaged unimpressive viewership ratings, with a 10.3% share of audience only slightly above the channel's average.

== Episodes ==
Series	Episodes	Originally released		Viewers	Share (%)	Ref.
Series	Episodes	First released	Last released	Viewers	Share (%)	Ref.
1	9	13 September 2016	1 November 2016	1,632,000	10.3	

This is a caption
No. in season	Title	Viewers	Original release date	Share (%)
1	"Marta"	1,893,000	13 September 2016	11.4
2	"Elena"	1,469,000	20 September 2016	9.0
3	"Roberta"	1,625,000	27 September 2016	9.5
4	"Virtuditas"	1,688,000	4 October 2016	9.9
5	"Fermina"	1,560,000	11 October 2016	9.5
6	"Julia"	1,591,000	18 October 2016	9.5
7	"Rafael"	1,743,000	25 October 2016	10.3
8	"Antonio"	1,525,000	25 October 2016	13.6
9	"Marta y Elena"	1,595,000	1 November 2016	9.7

== Awards and nominations ==
Year	Award	Category	Nominee(s)	Result	Ref.
2017	Prix Europa Awards	Best TV Fiction		Nominated	
2017	19th Iris Awards	Best Actress	Marta Etura	Nominated	
2017	5th MiM Series Awards	Best Miniseries or TV Movie		Won	
2017	5th MiM Series Awards	Best Male Drama Actor	Eduardo Noriega	Nominated	
