= Carmen Rigalt =

Spanish journalist and novelist

Carme Rigalt Tarragó (Vinaixa, Lleida, 1949) is a Catalan journalist and novelist.

== Writing career ==
After graduating in journalism from the University of Barcelona, she began her career at the newspaper Pueblo in 1975. She also started writing for the magazine Viva in 1976.

In 1977, she was hired by the newspaper Informaciones, and a year later directed the women's magazine Libera. Since 1992, she writes a column in El Mundo. She has also contributed to the magazine Diez Minutos.

In 1997, she published her first novel Mi corazón que baila con espigas, which became a finalist of the Premio Planeta. Since then she has published the novel La mujer de agua and the non-fiction book Diario de una adicta a casi todo.

== Controversy ==
In 2001, the Provincial Court of Madrid acquitted her of the crime of damaging the honor of the singer Alejandro Sanz, who she claimed was a homosexual in El Mundo. However, the decision was reversed in 2008 by the Supreme Court, condemning Rigalt, the newspaper El Mundo, Miguel Ángel Mellado and Unidad Editorial (the publisher of El Mundo), and ordered them to pay 30,000 euros to Alejandro Sanz.

In 2018, she received widespread criticism for an opinion piece she wrote in El Mundo newspaper comparing central Madrid being restricted to traffic to the Warsaw Ghetto.

== Personal life ==
She is married to the journalist Antonio Casado and has two sons. Her son Antonio Casado Rigalt, is a diplomat, and her other son is Daniel Casado Rigalt, is a writer and expert in archeology.

== Works ==
- Yo fui chica de alterne (1976)
- La vida empieza en lunes (1996)
- Cosas de mujer (1997)
- Mi noche de bodas (1997)
- Mi corazón que baila con espigas (1997)
- La mujer de agua (2000)
- Diario de una adicta a casi todo (2002)
- Todas somos princesas y otras crónicas de la vida cotidiana (2004)
- ¡Socorro!: me estoy pareciendo a mi madre (co-written with Rosa Villacastín, 2005).
- Noticia de mi vida (2021)
