= Antonio Gómez Rufo =

Spanish writer (born 1954)

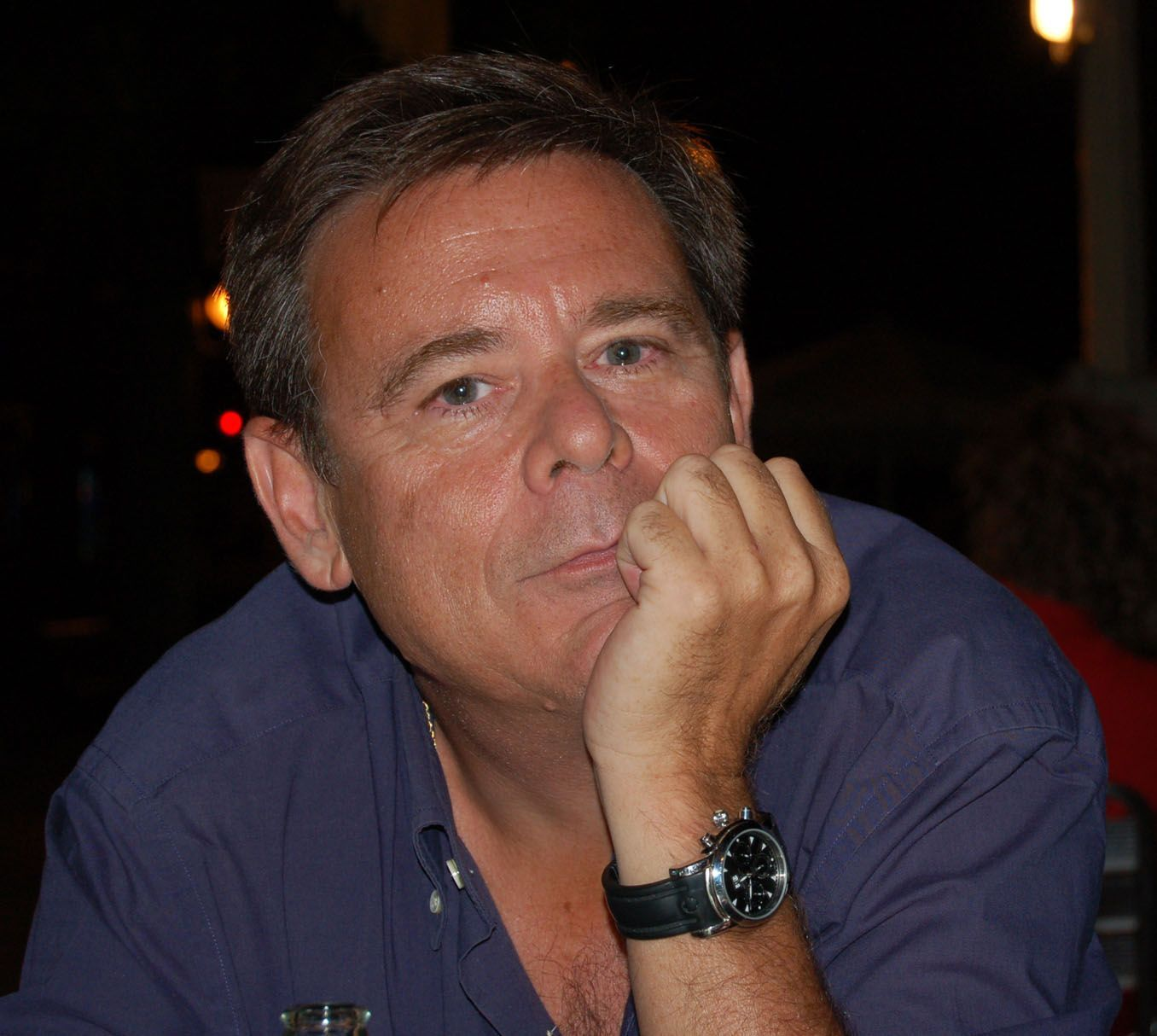
- Born: 1954 (age 71–72); Madrid, Spain
- Occupation: Writer

Antonio Gómez Rufo professionally known simply as Gómez Rufo (born 1954 in Madrid) is a Spanish writer.

Gómez achieved a law degree at the Complutense University of Madrid, he graduated in 1977 and between 1979 and 1983 he worked as a lawyer. In 1984 he began working as a screenwriter and poet for books. His debut was in 1984 when he wrote his first book entitled El último goliardo. He wrote the screenplay for the 1999 film París Tombuctú (which starred Michel Piccoli).

In 2005 Gómez won the Fernando Lara Novel Award for El secreto del rey cautivo.

== Books ==
- El último goliardo (1984)
- Natalia (1988)
- El carnaval perpetuo (1992)
- Aguas tranquilas, aguas profundas (1992)
- Crónica de nadie (1992)
- El Club de los Osos Traviesos (1993)
- La leyenda del falso traidor (1994)
- Un gato en el desván (1995)
- Las lágrimas de Henan (1996)
- Si tú supieras (1997)
- El desfile de la victoria (1999)
- El alma de los peces (2001)
- Los mares del miedo (2002)
- Adiós a los hombres (2004)
- El secreto del rey cautivo (2005)
- El señor de Cheshire (2006)
- Balada triste en Madrid (2006)
- La noche del tamarindo (2008)
- La abadía de los crímenes (2011)
- La más bella historia de amor de Paula Cortázar (2012)
