= 20 minutos =

Spanish free online newspaper

- Founder: José Antonio Martínez Soler
- Language: Spanish
- City: Madrid
- Country: Spain
- Website: www.20minutos.es

20 minutos is a Spanish free newspaper, with local editions in several Spanish cities, published by Multiprensa & Mas S.L.

== History ==
Multiprensa & Mas S.L. was founded in Madrid in 1999. The founder of 20 minutos is José Antonio Martínez Soler.

20 minutos is published under an Attribution-ShareAlike Creative Commons licence, which entitles anyone to freely copy, distribute, display, make derivative works and commercial use of the work. Additionally, the newspaper can be downloaded from their site.

Its majority stockholder is 20 Min Holding, a leader in free daily newspapers in Switzerland (20 minutes in French and 20 Minuten in German), France (20 minutes), and Spain. 20 Min Holding's majority stockholder is Schibsted, a Norwegian communication group that was founded in 1839, listed on the Oslo Stock Exchange, and has a strong presence in Norway, Sweden, Denmark, Switzerland, Estonia, Finland, France, and Spain, where it is the owner of both paid and free newspapers, television stations, radio stations, multimedia, etc.

For many years in Spain it battled rival free newspapers ADN, Metro and Qué!, all of which finally stopped due to the crisis, and since 2011, 20 minutos has dominated and remains in circulation in many parts of Spain.

The CEO of 20 Min Holding is Sverre Munck. Born in 1953, Sverre is a Norwegian economist with a PhD from Stanford and Yale. He is also Executive VP (International Operations) at Schibsted ASA, President of Multiprensa Holding, owner of Multiprensa & Mas, the publisher of "20 Minutes" in Spain, and President of the 20 Min Holding group.
