= Ángeles Caso =

Spanish journalist, translator and writer

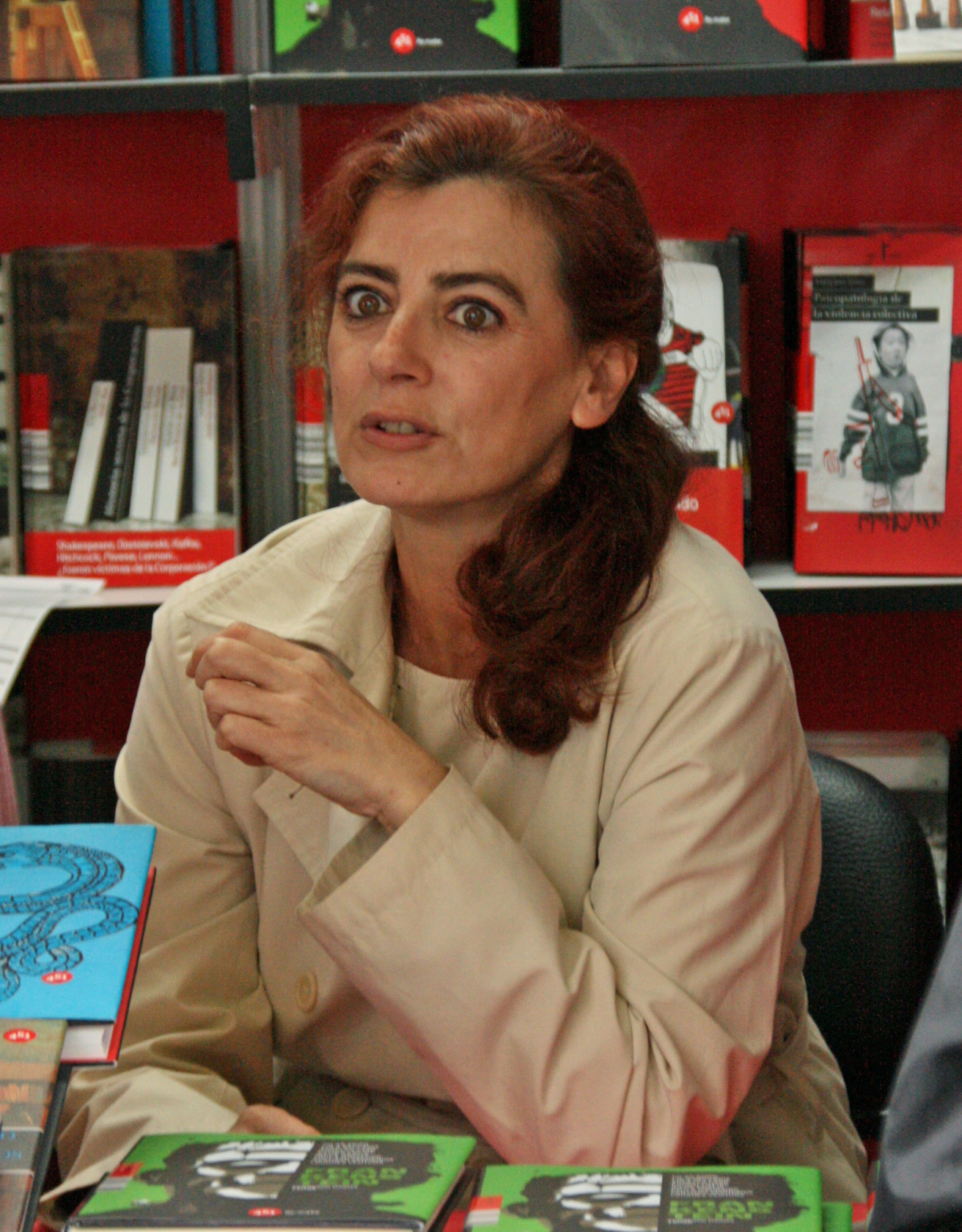
- Feria del Libro de Madrid, 31 May 2008
- Born: María de los Ángeles Caso Machicado; 16 July 1959; Gijón (Asturias), Spain
- Education: University of Oviedo
- Occupations: Novelist, writer, journalist, news
- Years active: 1985-presents

María de los Ángeles Caso Machicado (born 16 July 1959 in Gijón) is a Spanish journalist, translator and writer. She is a recipient of the Premio Planeta de Novela.

Her father, José Miguel Caso González, was a professor and vice-chancellor at the Faculty of Philology of the University of Oviedo. She studied History and Geography, but she worked later as a journalist in Panorama regional. She also worked for the Prince of Asturias Foundation or the Institute Feijoo of 18th century studies at the University of Oviedo and in different media like Televisión Española, Cadena SER and Radio Nacional de España.

== Prizes ==
- Finalist Premio Planeta, El peso de las sombras, 1994
- Premio Fernando Lara, Un largo silencio, 2000
- Premio Planeta, Contra el viento, 2009

== Filmography ==
- Telediario, TVE (1985–1986)
- La Tarde, TVE (1985–1986)
- Deseo (by Gerardo Vera, script) (2002)

== Works ==
- Asturias desde la noche. 1988. Guía.
- Elisabeth, emperatriz de Austria-Hungría o el hada. 1993.
- El peso de las sombras. 1994. Finalista XLIII Premio Planeta 1994.
- El inmortal. 1996, compilation: Érase una vez la paz.
- El mundo visto desde el cielo. 1997.
- El resto de la vida. 1998.
- El verano de Lucky. 1999.
- La trompa de los monos. 1999, compilation: Mujeres al alba
- La alegría de vivir. 1999, compilation: Hijas y padres
- Un largo silencio. 2000. V Premio Fernando Lara de novela.
- Giuseppe Verdi, la intensa vida de un genio. 2001. Biography of Giuseppe Verdi.
- Las olvidadas, una historia de mujeres creadoras. 2005.
- Contra el viento.2009. LVIII Premio Planeta 2009.
- Donde se alzan los tronos. 2012
- Rahima Begum. 2013
- Todo ese fuego. 2016. Novel based on the Bronte Sisters
