= Y Dios en la última playa =

1981 novel by Cristóbal Zaragoza

- Author: Cristóbal Zaragoza
- Language: Spanish
- Publisher: Planeta
- Publication date: 1981
- Publication place: Spain
- Pages: 251
- ISBN: 9788432055478

Y Dios en la última playa (lit. 'And God on the Last Shore') is a 1981 novel by the Spanish writer Cristóbal Zaragoza.

== Plot ==
The story takes place in the Basque Country and revolves around the armed separatist group ETA, although this is never explicitly mentioned in the novel itself. The main character is a member of a separatist command who refuses to comply when he is ordered to execute a soldier. This makes his own group sentence him to death.

== Reception ==
José F. Beaumont of El País wrote that the book has universal value and application, because Zaragoza does not take a side in a political conflict, but condemns violence as such.

The book received the Premio Planeta de Novela. It was a commercial success and eventually printed in 600,000 copies.
