= Puedo prometer y prometo =

Spanish political catch phrase

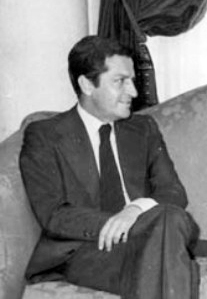
Image of Adolfo Suárez González.

Puedo prometer y prometo (English: I can promise, and I do promise) is a classic catchphrase said by Spanish politician Adolfo Suárez, first said in the first post-Franco general elections in Spain in 1977.

The phrase, which was initially derided by some comedians soon became a definitive accolade for choosing Suárez and is remembered as one of the symbols of the Spanish Transition subsequently being used in popular parlance for both political and journalistic purposes.

== Background ==
Caudillo Francisco Franco died on 20 November 1975. Two days later, Juan Carlos I was proclaimed King of Spain at the Palacio de las Cortes palace in accordance with the provisions of the Spanish law of succession referendum, 1947. The first government under King Juan Carlos I kingdom was headed by Carlos Arias Navarro who had been appointed under Franco and soon lost the support of the King, getting overwhelmed by the many demonstrations against it – and seen as a conservative force opposed to true reforms. So, in July 1976, Adolfo Suárez was appointed prime minister by the King. Despite not initially having public support, Suárez managed to unite all democratic forces to develop a process of reform that allowed turning the Spanish State into a Western democracy. With that in mind it was enacted the Political Reform Act of 1977, the last of the Fundamental Laws of the Realm which had gone ahead through concessions made by the Government of Suárez and supported by the President of the Cortes Españolas, Torcuato Fernández-Miranda, which had been approved in the Spanish political reform referendum, 1976, the project received the approval of 94.1% of voters.

The Government, in agreement with the provisions of Royal Decree-Law 20/1977 of 18 March, called for elections by universal suffrage for a new bicameral Parliament, to be held on 15 June 1977. In turn, they ensured that these elections were fully democratic and counted with the presence of the left through measures such as the legalization of the Communist Party of Spain, the dissolution of the Movimiento Nacional or extension of the amnesty.

== Speech ==
The phrase, designed by Suárez speechwriter (and later his presidential Communication Director) Fernando Ónega, was part of the discourse of Adolfo Suárez, as candidate of the Union of the Democratic Centre, which was part of the free spaces that electoral political parties arranged to go to citizens in the closing of the election campaign on 13 June 1977. This speech, broadcast by Televisión Española, was the one that closed the election messages and was introduced by a tune whose lyrics said: "Vote center, vote Suárez, vote freedom. The sure path to democracy". Adolfo Suárez subsequently appeared on screen, uttering his discourse, with a first part relating to the promises fulfilled

I modestly believe that in this new moment for Spain and asking for your vote I'm not bringing my papers empty, nor am I a mystery. We promised to return sovereignty to the Spanish people, and tomorrow they exert it. We promised to normalize our political life, manage the transition peacefully, build democracy from the law, and we believe that, with the logical deficiencies, we've succeeded. We promised that all political families may have a place in Parliament, and they can do it on Wednesday.

Once Suárez had referred to the promises he had kept he used the formula "I can promise, and I promise..." to give strength to his speech

But if you give us your vote,

I can promise and I do promise that our government acts will constitute a staggered set of rational and objective steps for progressively solving our problems.
I can promise and I do promise to try to develop a constitution in collaboration with all groups represented in Parliament, whatever their number of seats.
I can promise and I do promise, because after the elections all the tools will exist, to devote all efforts to achieve social understanding to set new basic guidelines to be followed by the Spanish economy in the following years.
I can promise and I do promise that the men of the Union of the Democratic Centre will promote fiscal reform to ensure, once and for all, that pay more who have more.
I can promise and I do promise a legal framework to institutionalize each region on its own merits.
I can promise and I do promise that we will work with honesty, with cleanliness and in a way that you can control the actions of government.

I can, finally, promise and I do promise that the goal of a Spain for everybody won't be jeopardized by the ambitions of some and the privileges of the few.

== Legacy ==
Logo of Union of the Democratic Centre.

The inclusion of the "I can promise and I do promise" formula in the final speech of the election campaign has been considered a posteriori as a key factor in the victory of the Union of the Democratic Centre, since a victory of the Spanish Socialist Workers' Party was also considered possible. Suárez managed to identify UCD with himself (hence the use of the first person in the phrase) providing strength to a party which later (with Suárez's resignation in 1981) proved to be very unstable.
