= Alicia Kopf =

Spanish author and artist

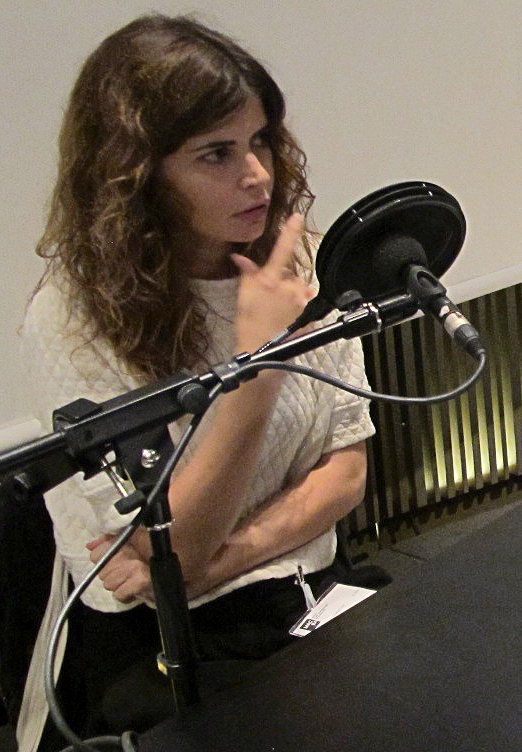
- Born: Imma Ávalos Marqués; 28 November 1982 (age 43); Girona, Spain
- Occupations: Author, artist
- Notable work: Brother in Ice

Alicia Kopf is the pseudonym of Imma Ávalos Marqués (born 28 November 1982 in Girona), a Spanish author and artist based in Barcelona.

Kopf is interested in the concept of exploration, particularly polar exploration, which is visible throughout her work both as an artist and an author. Her debut novel, Brother in Ice, was published in the English translation (trans. Mara Faye Lethem) by And Other Stories in 2018.

She currently works at the Open University of Catalonia as a lecturer in Communications.

== Novels ==
- Hermano de hielo, 2016; Brother in Ice (trans. Mara Faye Lethem), And Other Stories, 2018.

== Awards ==
- (2015) Documenta de Narrativa Prize, for Hermano de hielo.
- (2016) Libreter Prize, for Hermano de hielo
- (2016) Critical Eye Award (Ojo Crítico), for Hermano de hielo
