= Manuel Leguineche =

Spanish journalist (1941–2014)

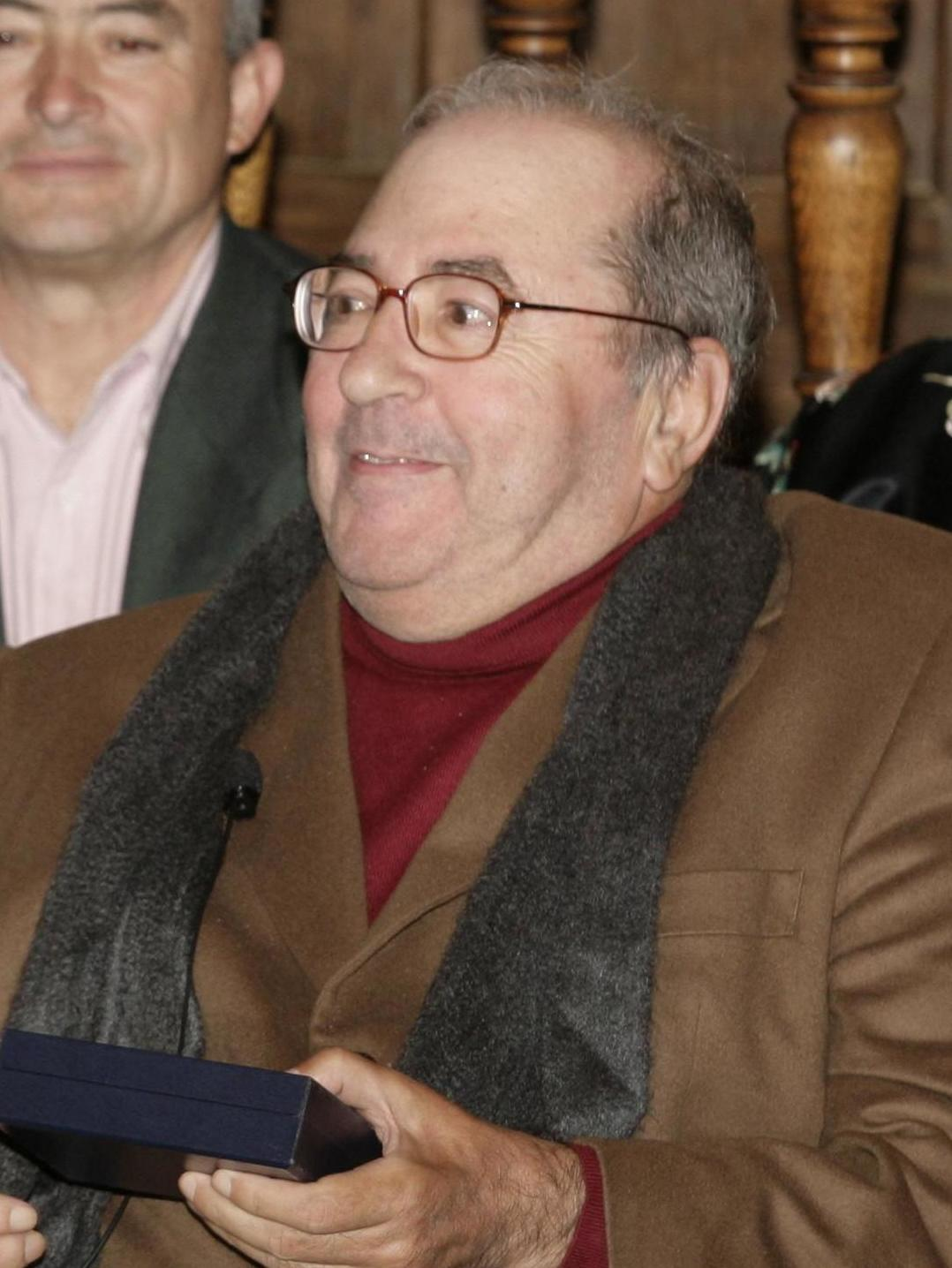
Manu Leguineche receiving the Order of Constitutional Merit (2007)

Manuel Leguineche Bollar, better known as Manu Leguineche, (28 September 1941 – 22 January 2014) was a Spanish correspondent, journalist and writer. He was born in Arratzu, Biscay. He was one of the contributors of Doblón magazine from 1974 to 1976. He founded the Spanish news agencies Colpisa and Fax Press. He divorced from Rosa María Mateo.

He was the inaugural winner of the Cirilo Rodríguez Journalism Award in 1984.

He died on 22 January 2014 in Madrid from an illness.

== Selected works ==
- The forgotten men (1981) (with Jesús Torbado). Published originally in Spanish as Los topos, 1977)
- Los años de la infamia: crónica de la II Guerra Mundial (1995)
- Adiós, Hong-Kong (1996)
- Annual, 1921 (1997)
- Apocalipsis Mao: una visión de la nueva China (1999)
- La felicidad de la tierra (1999)
- Recordad Pearl Harbor (2001)
- Gibraltar (2002)
- Madre Volga (2003)
