= Marta Portal =

Spanish writer (1930-2016)

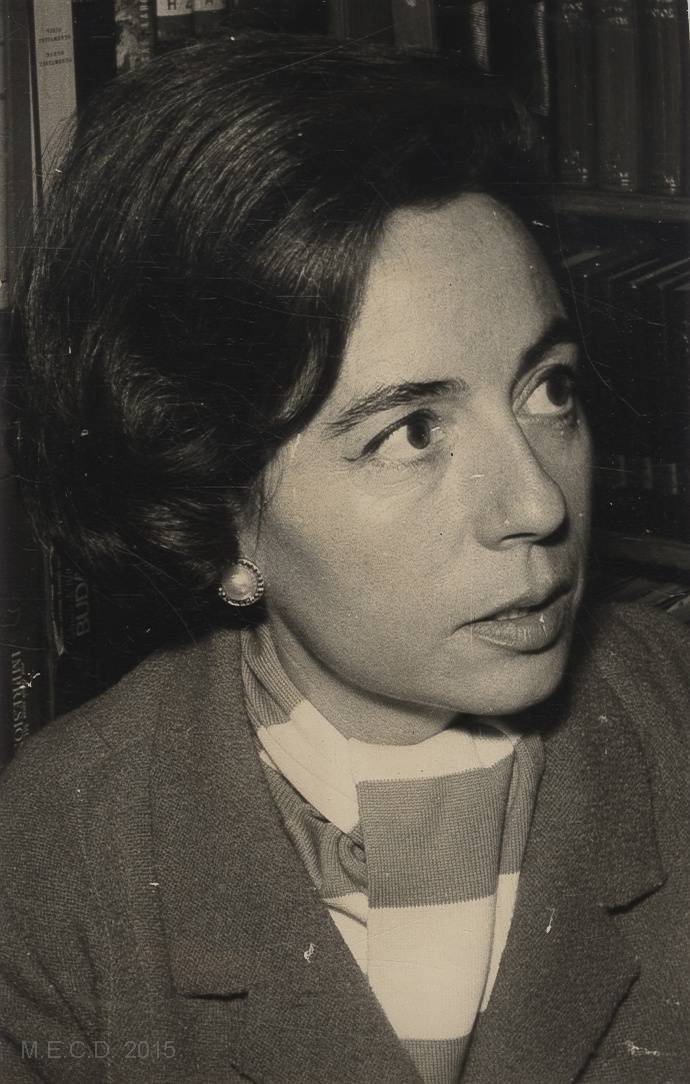
- Portal in 1970
- Born: Marta Portal Nicolás; 10 August 1930; Nava, Asturias, Spain
- Died: 26 August 2016 (aged 86); Madrid, Spain
- Education: Complutense University of Madrid
- Occupations: Teacher, journalist
- Notable work: A tientas y a ciegas
- Awards: Premio Planeta (1966); Premio Adelaida Ristori (1975); Premio Hucha de plata de cuentos (1991); Premio Periodismo y el Horizonte (1992); Premio de las Letras de Asturias (2007)

Marta Portal Nicolás (10 August 1930 – 26 August 2016) was a Spanish writer, critic, journalist, and professor associated with the Generation of '50. She was a recipient of the Premio Planeta de Novela.

== Career ==
Portal held a degree in philosophy and literature and a PhD in Information Sciences, and taught Hispano-American literature at the Complutense University of Madrid. In her work as a journalist she wrote news articles and literary criticism, as well as opinion columns in media such as ABC, El Alcázar, and Pueblo.

As a novelist, she discussed issues of women's education and double standards. In 1966 she was awarded the Premio Planeta for the novel A tientas y a ciegas. Portal received other awards over the course of her career, such as the Premio Adelaida Ristori, Premio Hucha de Plata de cuentos, and Premio de las Letras de Asturias. She was president of the Cultural Association of Hispano-Mexican Friendship. In 2001, the city council of her native town inaugurated the Casa de Cultura Marta Portal in her honor.

Marta Portal died in Madrid on 26 August 2016.

== Works ==
=== Novels ===
- A tientas y a ciegas, Barcelona, Editorial Planeta, 1966 (Premio Planeta 1966)
- El malmuerto (1967)
- A ras de las sombras (1968)
- Ladridos a la luna (1970)
- El buen camino (1975)
- Un espacio erótico (1982)
- Pago de traición, Barcelona, Editorial Planeta, 1983
- El ángel caído (1994)
- Él y yo, nosotros tres (2002)

=== Essays ===
- El maíz: grano sagrado de América (1970)
- Proceso narrativo de la revolución mexicana (1977)
- Análisis semiológico de Pedro Páramo (1981)
- Rulfo: Dinámica de la violencia (1984)

=== Short stories ===
- La veintena (1973)
