= Doblón =

Spanish political news and economic magazine (1974–1976)

- Editor-in-chief: José Antonio Martínez Soler
- Categories: Political news magazine; Business magazine
- Frequency: Weekly
- Circulation: 30,000 (1975)
- Publisher: Publicaciones Controladas
- Founder: José Antonio Martínez Soler
- Founded: 1974
- First issue: September 1974
- Final issue: September 1976
- Language: Spanish

Doblón was a weekly news and business magazine which was in circulation between 1974 and 1976. Its subtitle was semanario de economía e información general (weekly economic and general information magazine). It was one of the critics of Franco regime.

== History and profile ==
Doblón was launched in September 1974. José Antonio Martínez Soler was the founder of the magazine who had worked as the editor-in-chief of Cambio 16. He started Doblón following his dismissal from Cambio 16.

Soler was kidnapped on 2 March 1976. The reason for his kidnapping was his article on civil guards which was published in Doblón on 10 February 1976. Soler escaped unhurt, but left the magazine and also, Spain in September 1976.

In 1975 Doblón sold nearly 30,000 copies. Although it featured economy-related articles and news, Ángel Arrese argues that it was not a genuine business publication, but employed these writings to camouflage its political stance to avoid bans. Some of the contributors of the weekly included Primo González, José García Abad, Fernando González Urbaneja, Mª Antonia Iglesias, Manuel Leguineche, Karmentxu Marín, José Luis Martín Prieto, Nativel Preciado, Vicente Verdú and caricaturist Peridis. The magazine ceased publication in September 1976 when the publisher, Publicaciones Controladas, went bankruptcy.
