= Concha Alós =

Spanish writer

- Born: María Concepción Alós Domingo; 22 May 1926; Valencia, Spain
- Died: 1 August 2011 (aged 85)
- Occupation: Writer
- Spouse: Baltasar Porcel
- Writing career
- Language: Spanish

María Concepción Alós Domingo (22 May 1926 – 1 August 2011), better known as Concha Alós, was a Spanish writer. She was a recipient of the Premio Planeta de Novela.

== Biography ==
Born in Valencia, Alós lived the better part of her life in Barcelona. In 1962 she made her literary debut with the novel Los Enanos, and followed it up with Los cien pájaros in 1963. The success she attained with her early works was consolidated in 1964 when she received the 13th Premio Planeta de Novela literary prize for her novel Las hogueras. Her last published novel was El asesino de los sueños in 1986.

Part of her childhood was spent in Castelló de la Plana, currently in the Valencian Community, within a Republican working-class family. Due to bombardments by Nationalist forces during the Civil War, the family moved to Lorca, Murcia. A similar flight and return is the central theme of her novel El caballo rojo.

She was the wife and disseminator of the work of the writer, journalist, and literary critic Baltasar Porcel, and translated part of his work from Catalan to Castilian Spanish. They met while Porcel was working as a typesetter at the Francoist Majorcan newspaper Baleares, owned by Alós's first husband. Year later, both writers got divorced.

Her work is framed within realism and social testimony. It addresses in direct language issues which were common in Spanish literature of the time, such as sex, homosexuality, and prostitution. Because of this, Alós had problems with Francoist censorship, but nevertheless several of her works were bestsellers in the 1960s and '70s.

== Work ==
- Cuando la luna cambia de color (1958) – novel
- Los enanos (1962) – novel
- Los cien pájaros (1963) – novel
- Las hogueras (1964) – novel (winner of the 13th Premio Planeta)
- El caballo rojo (1966) – novel
- La madama (1969) – novel
- Rey de Gatos. Narraciones antropófagas. (1972) – short stories
- Os habla Electra (1975) – novel
- Argeo ha muerto, supongo (1982) – novel
- El asesino de los sueños (1986) – novel
