= Julio Manegat =

Spanish journalist, novelist, playwright, and poet

Julio Manegat (Barcelona, 4 January 1922 – Barcelona, 9 August 2011) was a Spanish journalist, novelist, playwright, and poet.

He wrote the poetry book Canción en la sangre (1948), the short story book Historias de los otros (1967), the novels La feria vacía (1961) which won the City Award of Barcelona, El pan y los peces (1963), which won the Spanish Language Selections Award, and Amado mundo podrido (1976). He also wrote the plays El silencio de Dios (1956) and Antes, algo, alguien (1974). His short story El coleccionista won the Hucha de Oro Story Competition in 1984. His novels La ciudad amarilla (1958) and Spanish Show (1965) were finalists for the Premio Planeta.

== Biography ==
He began writing articles for El Noticiero Universal in 1946, and since 1952 was one of its full-time writers (as a literary critic). He became the newspaper's editor in 1953, as well as its literary and theater critic. He wrote for many Spanish newspapers, magazines, radio and TV stations. He published over 150 volumes of articles. He was director of the Official School of Journalism in Barcelona since its reinstatement in 1968 until its termination ten years later with the creation of the new School of Journalism. On several occasions he has been a member of the board of the Press Association of Barcelona, for which he served as vice president for 4 years.

In 1956 he founded the theater "Critics Award" with Tomás Salvador and Joan Ramón Masoliver. He was a judge of numerous national literary and theater competitions, and lectured at cultural associations and courses throughout Spain. Some of his books have been translated into several languages. He has written prefaces for various published works of Spanish and foreign authors.
