= Rafael Peñas Cruz =

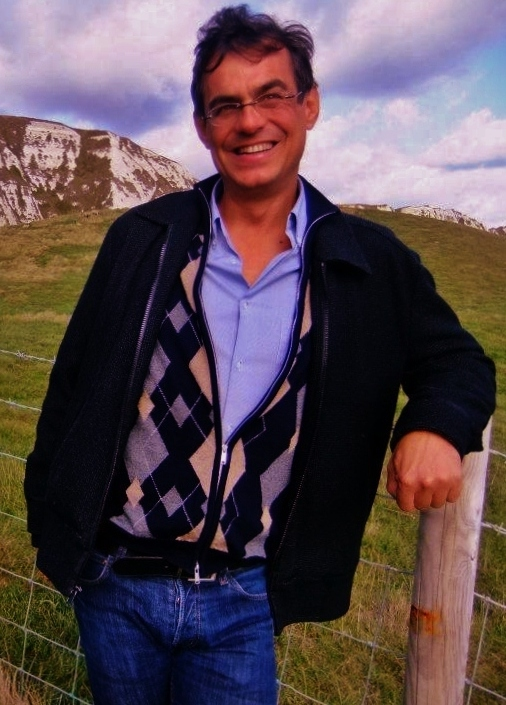
- Born: March 1, 1964 (age 61); Spain
- Occupation: Writer, translator

Rafael Peñas Cruz (born March 1, 1964, in Spain) has been a novelist since 2004.

He was born in Pozoblanco in Cordoba in Spain. His parents moved to Barcelona when he was young, and he graduated in English Literature from the city's university, before coming to London to study in summer 1989, and live from 1992 onwards.

There, in a relationship with the film maker Constantine Giannaris he acted in the films "Jean Genet is Dead" (1989) and "Trojans" (1990) credited as Rafael Peñas.

After completing an MA in Hispanic studies at Birkbeck University of London, he worked at schools and colleges teaching Spanish and Hispanic culture. At the Blackheath Bluecoat Church of England School he taught Rio Ferdinand who went on to achieve a noted career in football, and later worked at the City of London School where Daniel Radcliffe who subsequently enjoyed fame as a screen and stage actor, was one of his students. Cruz started work at the London School of Economics in 2000 in the Language Centre, where he remained until the summer of 2019. He is now retired from teaching.

He married in London in 2004, the year his first novel, Las Dimensiones del Teatro (The Dimensions of the Theatre) was published under the name Rafael Peñas. But it was his second novel Charlie, published in 2010, that gained him international attention, after he won the Terenci Moix Prize for Lesbian and Gay fiction. The story was loosely based on a young student of Cruz's, Charlie Aldridge, from his days as a schoolmaster at the City of London School in the capital.

He is working on his third novel, with the working title Celia's Legacy which is due for publication in 2024, and an autobiographical chronicle provisionally entitled Up and Out in Barcelona and London. He is also developing a website The Quince Jelly Tin quincejellytin.com which is - in his words - a writing project to turn old photographic albums into stories, thereby creating a repository of people's lives.

In 2020, he co-authored Una imagen y mil palabras a collaboration with the designer and artist Mayca Martinez Victoria. His writings were inspired by, and an interpretation of, her abstract images and collages.

The following year he translated the work of the Balaeric poet and author Àngel Terron from Catalan into English. The volume entitled The Poetry of Science was the first publication from his company Goatstar Books.

Goatstar Books followed up The Poetry of Science with Popping Corn, a translation of the work of Spanish surrealist poet Mendigo Diego into English. Late in 2022, Cruz and Goatstar published Keats Now an attempt to bring the writings of the poet John Keats to a newer Spanish audience.
