= Montejos del Camino =

Montejos del Camino is a Spanish town, belonging to the municipality of Valverde de la Virgen, in the province of León and the region of Tierra de León, in the Autonomous Community of Castilla y León. It is located between the arroyo of Truévano and Oncina, tributaries of the Esla river.

The lands of Montejos del Camino border those of the Conde de Gazola military base to the north, Ferral del Bernesga and San Andrés del Rabanedo to the northeast, the Military Aerodrome of León and La Virgen del Camino to the east, Valverde de la Virgen to the south, San Miguel del Camino and Velilla de la Reina to the southwest, Villanueva de Carrizo to the west and Cimanes del Tejar, Azadón and Secarejo to the northwest.

In 2020, it had a population of 621.
