= Silvia Grijalba =

Spanish journalist and writer

Silvia Grijalba (born 1967 in Madrid) is a journalist, writer and cultural manager in the music field. She directs the Cervantes Institute in Cairo and Alexandria, after having been manager of the Rafael Pérez Estrada Foundation and director of the Gerald Brenan House in Malaga, Spain. She was awarded the Fernando Lara Novel Prize in 2011.

== Biography ==
Linked to the Spanish newspaper El Mundo since its foundation, she was an editor in the culture section. She has been contributor in other media specialized in music such as Glamour, Ruta 66, Rolling Stone or Vogue.

She broke away from the professional world as a journalist to creative writing. Her writing career began with two novels, Alivio Rápido (2001) and Atrapada en el Limbo (2005); six years later published Contigo Aprendí (With You I Learned), a work that takes place between Spain, Cuba and New York, where she novels the life of her paternal grandmother married to an Indiano. She won the Fernando Lara Novel Prize, worth 120,000 euros. Her last published novel is Tú me acostumbraste (2014). She is also the author of several music-related essays, such as Dios salve a la movida (2006), Palabra de rock, Antología de letristas españoles (2008), Más que famosos, and The rise and fall of the fascination with rock (2015) which constitutes a journey through her anecdotes as a music journalist for many years. She is also the author of Depeche Mode's Biography (1997), the first published in Spanish about the British group.

As a cultural manager, she has directed the festival Spoken Word Palabra y Música (Seville and Gijón, among other cities) and Poesía del Rock (Málaga), and has been the Manager of the Rafael Pérez Estrada Foundation and Director of the Gerald Brenan House in Málaga.

Since 2017 she has been Director of the Cervantes Institute in Cairo and Alexandria.
