= Jesús Fernández Santos =

Spanish writer and film director (1926–1988)

- Born: 9 November 1926; Madrid, Spain
- Died: 2 June 1988 (aged 61); Madrid, Spain

Jesús Fernández Santos (9 November 1926 – 2 June 1988) was a Spanish novelist, short story writer, film critic, film director and documentarist.

Born in Madrid, Fernández Santos studied philosophy and letters at the Complutense University of Madrid, and graduated in direction at the Instituto de Investigaciones y Experiencias Cinematográficas.

Fernández Santos was part of the Generation of '50 movement. His debut novel Los Bravos, published in 1954, has been described as "the first important novel of social realism of the post-war period" and "a model for the development of social realistic fiction over the next fifteen years".

During his literary career Fernández Santos received numerous awards and accolades, notably the 1970 Premio Nadal for Libro de las memorias de las cosas, the 1979 National Literature Prize for Narrative for Extramuros and the 1982 Premio Planeta de Novela for Jaque a la dama. He also served as film critic for El País since its foundation, and directed several films and documentaries.
