= Paloma Sánchez-Garnica =

Spanish writer

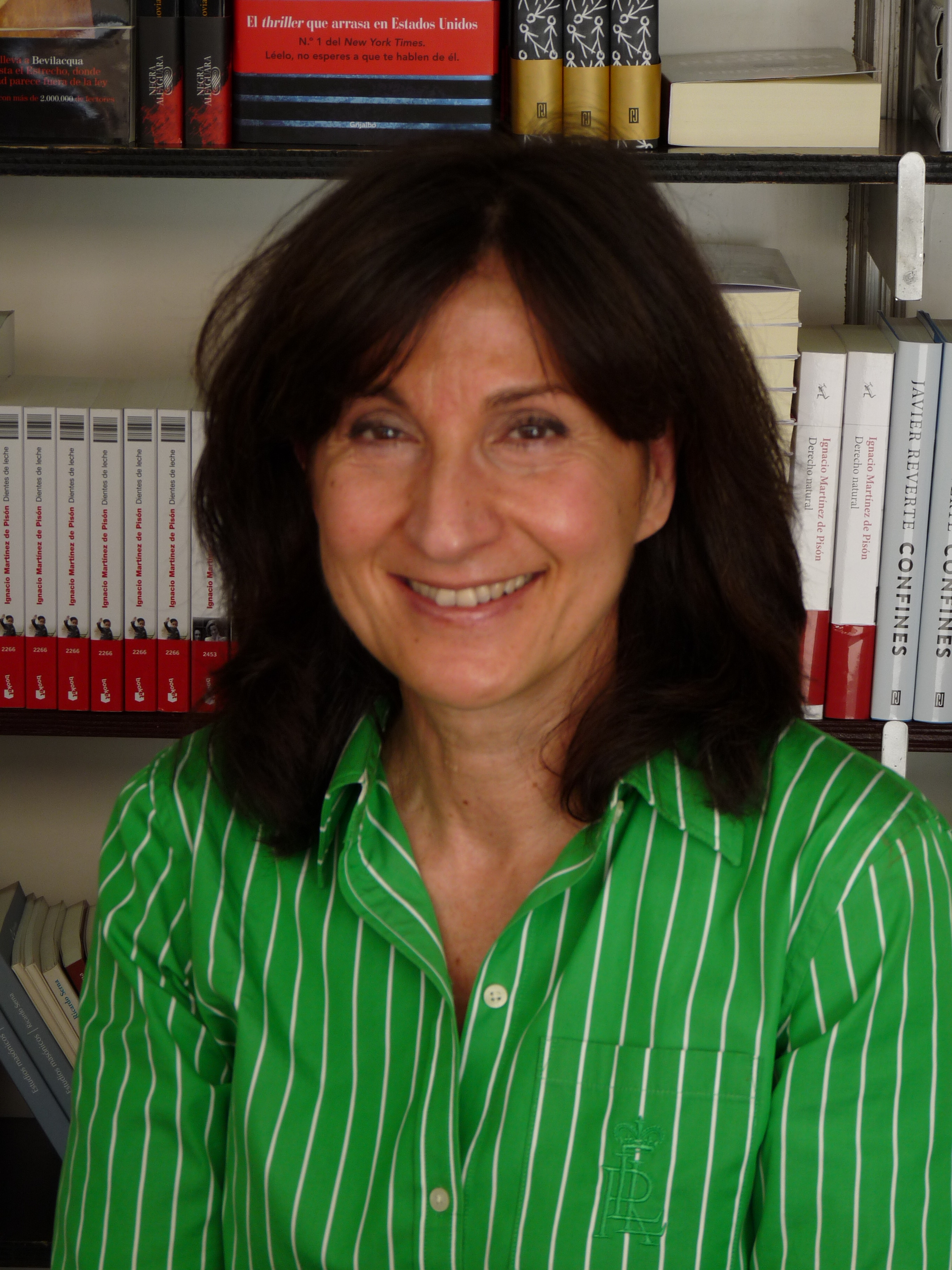
- Born: 1962 (age 63–64); Madrid, Spain
- Occupation: novelist

Paloma Sánchez-Garnica (born 1962) is a Spanish writer. She won the Fernando Lara Novel Award 2016, the runner-up for Premio Planeta de Novela 2021 and the winner in the 2024 Premio Planeta de Novela.

== Early life and education ==
Paloma Sánchez-Garnica was born in 1962, in Madrid, and grew up in Zaragoza. She studied law, geography and history.

== Career ==
Sánchez-Garnica has written historical novels with elements of thrillers and mystery fiction. She won the Fernando Lara Novel Award with the novel Mi recuerdo es más fuerte que tu olvido (2016) and in 2021 became the runner-up for Premio Planeta de Novela with Últimos días en Berlín.

In 2016, her novel La sonata del silencio was adapted to TV as The Sonata of Silence.

In 2024, she won the Premio Planeta, the best economically endowed award in Spanish literature, with her novel Victoria.

== Works ==
- El gran arcano, 2006
- La brisa de Oriente, 2009
- El alma de las piedras, 2010
- Las tres heridas, 2012
- La sonata del silencio, 2014
- Mi recuerdo es más fuerte que tu olvido, 2016
- La Sospecha de Sofía, 2019
- Últimos días en Berlín, 2021
- Victoria, 2024
