= Carmen Kurtz =

Spanish writer (1911–1999)

- Carmen Kurtz, believed to have been taken around 1964
- Born: Carmen de Rafael Marés; 18 September 1911; Barcelona, Spain
- Died: 5 February 1999 (aged 87); Barcelona, Spain
- Occupation: Author

Carmen Kurtz (Barcelona, 18 September 1911 – 5 February 1999) was a Spanish writer, who wrote under the name of her husband, Pedro Kurtz, in Spanish. Winner of various literary prizes - including the Planeta, and others, she made her name as a writer during the 1960s with a series of children's books featuring the main character, a boy called Óscar, who had a pet goose named Kina. She is known for her work in adult prose fiction and notably for her novel El desconocido

== Biography ==
Carmen de Rafael Marés was born into a cosmopolitan family. She was the granddaughter and great-granddaughter of Catalan immigrants who lived in United States, Mexico and Cuba. Her father was born in Havana, Cuba and her mother in Baltimore, United States of America. Part of her education was received in the United Kingdom and undoubtedly some of her experiences there were reflected in her books.

She married Frenchman Pedro Kurtz and lived in France from 1935. The couple spent most of World War II there; her husband spent two years in a Concentration camp. They moved back to Spain in 1943.

Carmen Kurtz began her literary career writing short stories. In 1955 she published her first novel, "Sleep under the water", which was awarded the City of Barcelona prize. The following year she won the Premio Planeta with "The Unknown".

In 1962, Kurtz began a series of Children's books, featuring Óscar. "Cosmonaut Óscar" tells the story of a boy and his pet Goose Kina, who decide to build a rocket. Although the adventure ends up being considered "just a dream", the truth is that Oscar travelled to other planets where he met socially advanced civilizations. This allowed for the introduction of a series of highly topical themes and was surprisingly advanced for its time.

== Awards ==
- Barcelona City Award 1954 by underwater Sleeps
- Planet Award 1956 by The Unknown
- Award Finalist 1963 Café Gijón in the dark
- Color Lazarillo Award 1964 by fire
- Barbastro City Award 1975 by Candida pigeons
- Spain's official candidate for the International Award Hans Christian Andersen 1980
- CCEI Prize 1980 by VEVA
