= Cristina López Barrio =

Spanish writer and lawyer

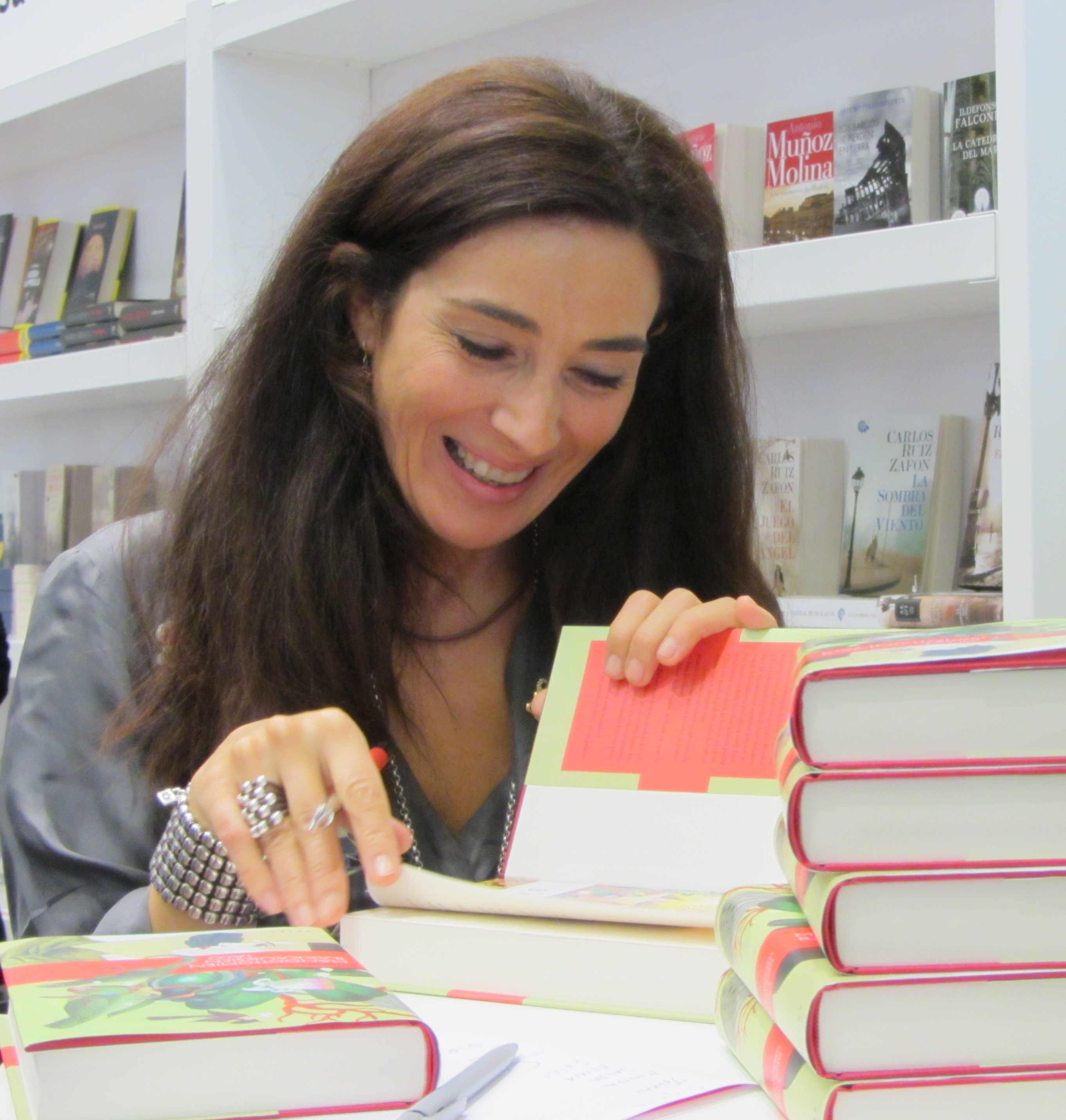
Cristina López Barrio, 2012

Cristina López Barrio (Madrid, 12 May 1970) is a Spanish writer and lawyer.

== Life ==
She studied law at the Complutense University of Madrid and she did a specialisation in IP at the Comillas Pontifical University. She followed a creative writing workshop with Clara Obligado in 2000.

== Works ==
- Niebla en Tánger, 2017
- Tierra de brumas, 2015
- El cielo en un infierno cabe, 2013
- El reloj del mundo, 2012
- La casa de los amores imposibles, 2010
- El hombre que se mareaba con la rotación de la Tierra, 2009

== Prizes ==
- Premio Villa Pozuelo de Alarcón, 2009
- Premi Blog Llegir en cas d'incendi, 2010
- Finalista Premio Planeta, 2017
