= Sonsoles Ónega =

Spanish journalist, TV presenter and writer

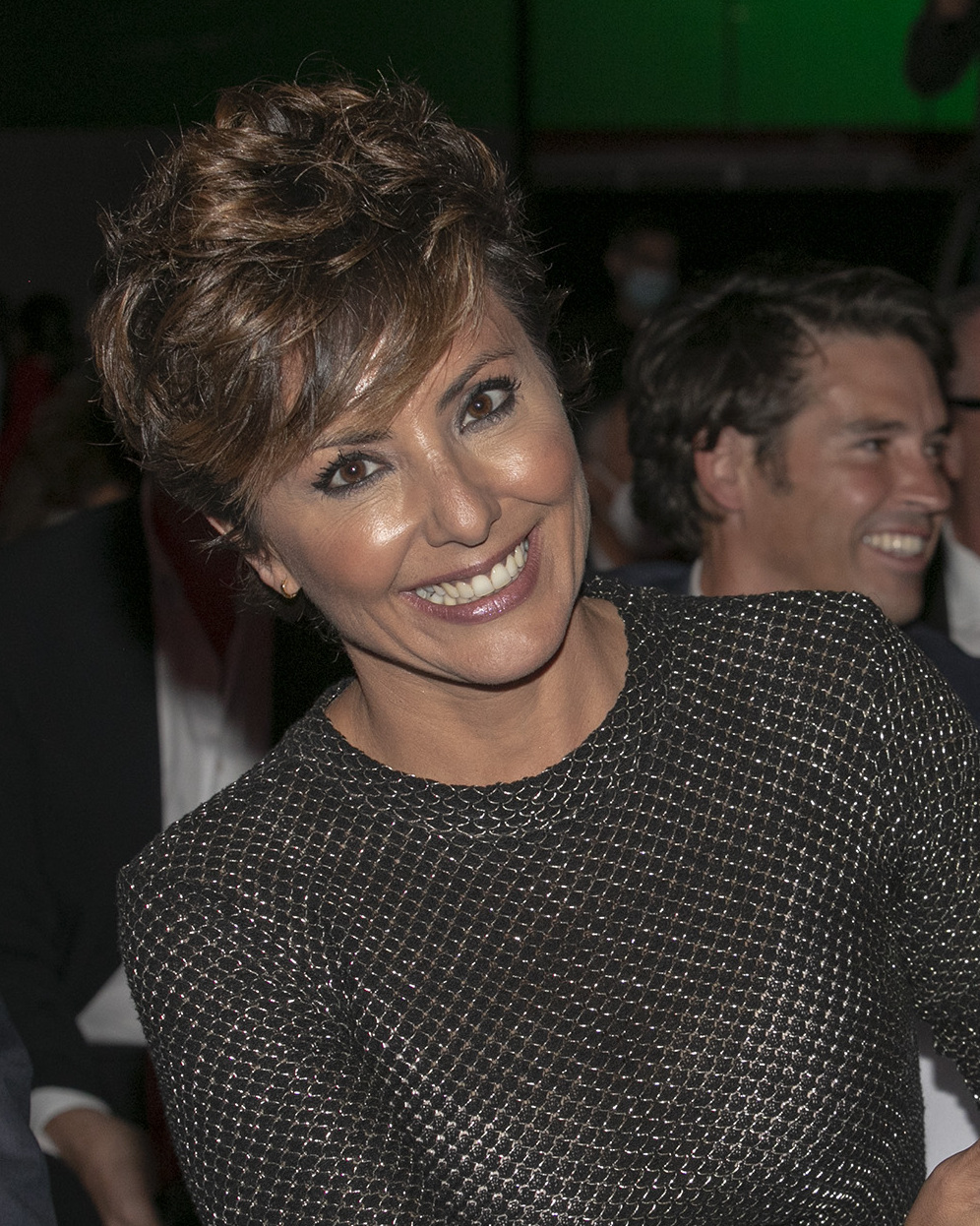
- Ónega in 2021
- Born: Sonsoles Ónega Salcedo; 30 November 1977 (age 48); Madrid, Spain
- Education: Universidad CEU San Pablo
- Occupations: Journalist, television presenter
- Years active: 1999–present
- Employer(s): Mediaset España (2005–2022); Atresmedia (2022–present)
- Awards: Fernando Lara Novel Award (2017); Premio Planeta de Novela (2023)

Sonsoles Ónega Salcedo (born 30 November 1977) is a Spanish journalist, TV presenter and writer.

== Biography ==
Ónega was born in Madrid on 30 November 1977. The daughter of journalist and speechwriter Fernando Ónega and Marisol Salcedo, she received a journalism degree from the Universidad CEU San Pablo in Madrid. She is the sister of fellow journalist Cristina Ónega.

She started her journalism career at CNN+ and joined Noticias Cuatro upon the launch of Cuatro in 2005. In 2008 she jumped ship to Informativos Telecinco, where she was parliamentary correspondent at the Congreso de los Diputados for ten years.

In 2004, she started a literary career with her short story Calle Habana, esquina Obispo, and followed it up with Donde Dios no estuvo, based on the 2004 train bombings. Her greatest success came in 2017 with the novel Después del amor, set in the Second Republic.

In 2017, she was awarded the Fernando Lara Novel Award for her novel Después del amor todo son palabras (English: After Love, Everything Is Just Words).

In 2018, she left her journalism post to host Telecinco chat show Ya es mediodía, and in 2020 she presented reality show La casa fuerte.

In 2022, she moved to Antena 3, disillusioned with Telecinco, to present daytime chat show Y ahora Sonsoles. The show received good ratings, and was brought back for a second series.

In 2023, she was awarded with the Premio Planeta de Novela for her novel Las hijas de la criada (English: The Maid’s Daughters).

== Private life ==
She married lawyer Carlos Prado Sanz in 2008, and they have two children. They separated in 2020.

== Filmography ==
=== Television ===
Year	Title	Channel	Role
1999–2005	Informativos	CNN+	Editor
2005–2008	Noticias Cuatro	Cuatro	Reporter
2007	11-M: La derrota de los embusteros	Cuatro	Presenter
2008–2018	Informativos Telecinco	Telecinco	Reporter; parliamentary correspondent
2018–2022	Ya es mediodía	Telecinco	Presenter
2019	Todo es mentira	Cuatro	Guest
2020	Adivina qué hago esta noche	Cuatro	Guest
2020	Supervivientes	Telecinco	Presenter
2020	Sálvame	Telecinco	Guest
2020	La casa fuerte	Telecinco	Presenter
2020	Quijotes del siglo XXI	Telecinco	Presenter
2021–2022	Ya son las ocho	Telecinco	Presenter
2021	Volverte a ver	Telecinco	Guest
2021	Rocío, contar la verdad para seguir viva	Telecinco	Guest
2022, 2023	El Hormiguero	Antena 3	Guest
2022, 2024	La Roca	Antena 3	Guest
2022–present	Y ahora Sonsoles	Antena 3	Presenter
2022	Pasapalabra	Antena 3	Guest
2022	Zapeando	LaSexta	Guest
2022	La ruleta de la suerte	Antena 3	Guest
2023	Amar es para siempre	Antena 3	Herself; 2 episodes
2023–present	Hablando en plata	Antena 3	Guest
2024–present	Lo tenemos que hablar	Antena 3	Guest

== Books ==
- Calle Habana, esquina Obispo (Septem Ed., 2005). ISBN 978-84-95687-95-1
- Donde Dios no estuvo (Grand Guignol Ed., 2007). ISBN 978-84-935090-5-7
- Encuentros en Bonaval (Planeta Ed., 2010) ISBN 978-84-8460-869-1
- Nosotras que lo quisimos todo (Planeta Ed., 2015). ISBN 978-84-08-13562-3
- Después del amor (Planeta Ed., 2017), Fernando Lara Novel Award winner. ISBN 978-84-08-17390-8
- Mil besos prohibidos (Planeta Ed., 2020). ISBN 978-84-08-22783-0
- Las hijas de la criada (Planeta Ed., 2023), Planeta Award winner. ISBN 978-84-08-28017-0
- Llevará tu nombre (Planeta Ed., 2026). ISBN 978-84-08-31524-7
