= Mercedes Salisachs =

Spanish writer and novelist (1916–2014)

Mercedes Salisachs Roviralta (18 September 1916 – 8 May 2014) was a Spanish writer and novelist. She began her career when she was a teenager and published more than thirty five novels. She wrote and published her last novel in 2013 at the age of 97. She is a recipient of the Premio Planeta de Novela.

== Biography ==
Salisachs was born in Barcelona, Spain.

In 1956, she won the City of Barcelona Prize with the work A Woman Comes to Town. In 1983, she won the Ateneo de Sevilla prize for her work Lack Volume and in 2004, she won the Fernando Lara Novel Award for her work The Last Maze.

Salisachs died in Barcelona from natural causes, aged 97. She is survived by four children and many grandchildren.
