= Terenci Moix =

Spanish writer (1942-2003)

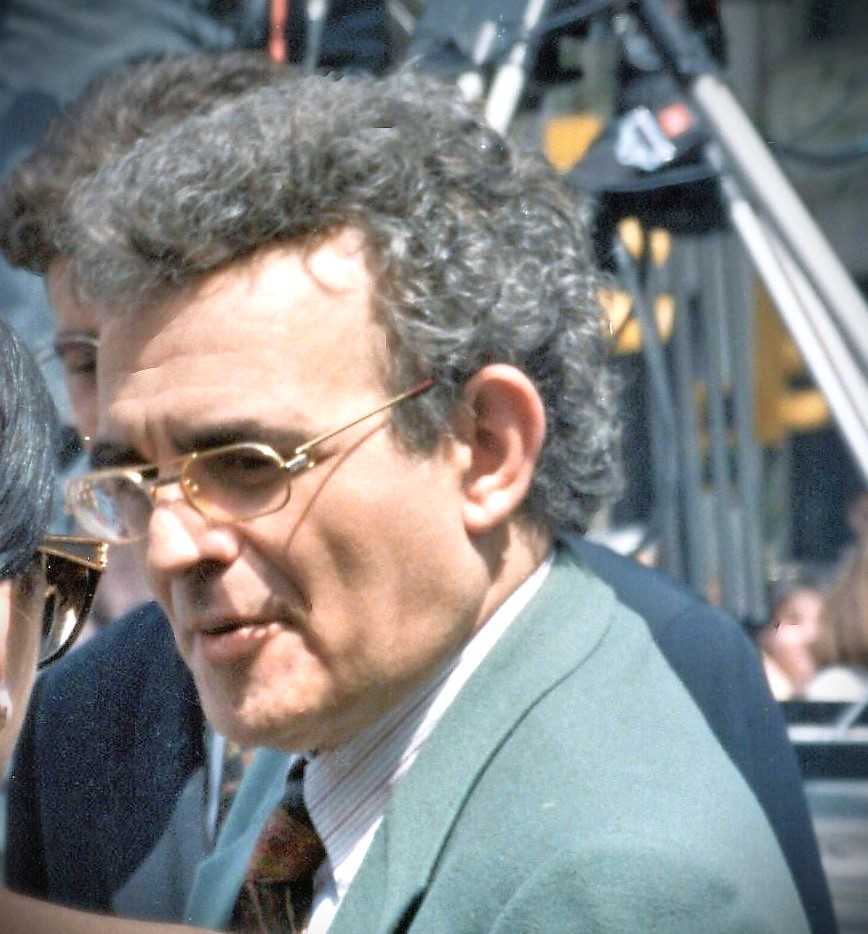
- Born: Ramon Moix i Meseguer; 5 January 1942; Barcelona, Spain
- Died: 2 April 2003 (aged 61); Barcelona, Spain
- Occupations: writer, novelist
- Writing career
- Language: Spanish, Catalan
- Notable awards: Ramon Llull Novel Award (1986); Fernando Lara Novel Award (1989)

Terenci Moix (Catalan pronunciation: [təˈɾɛnsi ˈmoʃ]; real name Ramon Moix i Meseguer; 5 January 1942 – 2 April 2003) was a Spanish writer, who wrote in the Spanish and in Catalan languages. He was the brother of poet/novelist Ana Maria Moix.

== Life and work ==
Moix was born and died in Barcelona. He was self-taught, and his first work, La torre de los vicios capitales (La torre dels vicis capitals in Catalan), was published in 1968. Many of his early works criticised the values of his time, especially the official morality of Francoism. In 1990, he wrote and published a children's book called, Los Grandes Mitos del Cine (English version as "The Greatest Stories of Hollywood Cinema"), which is illustrated by Willi Glasauer, and published by Círculo de Lectores. This children's book includes fun facts, trivia, and information accompanied by photos and Willi Glasauer's illustrations of the classic Hollywood films and stars such as Casablanca, Gone with the Wind, Cleopatra, and Tarzan the Ape Man.

He wrote in several newspapers: Tele-Exprés, Tele-Estel, El Correo Catalán, Destino, Serra d'Or, and El País. He was openly homosexual, and participated in many TV gatherings.

== Death ==
Moix died of emphysema on 2 April 2003 in Barcelona.

== Awards ==
In 1967 he won the Mercè Rodoreda Award for La torre dels vicis capitals. In 1992, he won the Ramon Llull Novel Award for El sexe dels àngels. In 1996, he became the first winner of the Fernando Lara Novel Award for his then-unpublished work El amargo don de la belleza.

An annual literature prize, bearing his name, the Terenci Moix Fundación Arena de Narrativa Gay y Lésbica, has been instituted. It was won most recently by Spanish novelist Rafael Peñas Cruz for his coming-of-age work, Charlie.

== Novels ==
- La torre de los vicios capitales
- El dia que murio Marilyn
- Olas sobre una roca desierta
- Món mascle
- La caiguda de L'imperi sodomita
- La increada conciencia de la raza o melodrama
- Sadistic, esperpentic i adhuc metafisic
- Nuestro Virgen de los mártires
- Amami, Alfredo! o polvo de estrellas
- No digas que fue un sueño
- Garras de astracan
- Mujercisimas
- La herida de la esfinge
- El arpista ciego
- El amargo don de la belleza (2011), ISBN 84-08-01899-X

== Collections of short stories ==
- La torre de los vicios capitals
- Tots els contes (Todos los cuentos)

== Essays ==
- Iniciació a una història del cine
- Los cómics, arte para el consumo y formas pop
- El sadismo de nuestra infancia
- Terenci del Nilo
- Crónicas italianas
- Hollywood stories (2 vols.)
- The Greatest Stories of Hollywood Cinema (Illustrated by Willi Glasauer), (Círculo de Lectores)
- Tres viajes románticos
