= José Antonio Martínez Soler =

José Antonio Martínez Soler (born January 8, 1947) is the founder of 20 minutos, Spain's daily newspaper based in Madrid with 14 editions in major cities. José was Nieman fellow at Harvard university in 1976–1977.

== Significant contribution to democracy in Spain ==
During his time as chief editor of the weekly Doblón, after the death of the dictator Francisco Franco, he was kidnapped, tortured, and faced a simulated execution. His kidnappers attempted to obtain the source of the information contained in his article about the purge of non-Francoist generals and moderate chiefs of the military.

The source gave him information to write and publish an article called “De Vega a Campano.” The source provided the information to stop the purge so that the Francoists would be unable to purge any further pro-democracy military personnel.

After the publication of the article, no Francoist general was then able to illegitimately transfer pro-democracy military personnel from higher positions of the military corps (Guardia Civil) and replace them with Francoist military personnel during Spain's transition from dictatorship to democracy.

== Later work in the United States ==
He was the bureau chief of a state-owned Spanish TV station in New York. He conducted interviews with the Spanish presidential candidates, Felipe Gonzalez and Jose Maria Aznar, in 1996. Aznar won the election and Jose was fired by the new government.
