= Andres dela Cruz =

Filipino basketball player

Personal information
- Born: November 10, 1923 Pasay, Rizal, Philippine Islands
- Died: June 5, 1993 (aged 69) Makati, Philippines
Medals
Men's basketball
Representing Philippines
Asian Games
Gold medal – first place	1951 New Delhi	Team

Andrés Piñeda "Andy" dela Cruz (November 10, 1923 – June 5, 1993) was a Filipino basketball player who competed in the 1948 Summer Olympics.
