= Fernando Ónega =

Spanish journalist (1947–2026

Fernando Ónega López (15 June 1947 – 3 March 2026) was a Spanish journalist and political analyst. He wrote several books that covered the recent history of Spain and important figures.

== Life and career ==
Ónega had three children, including two daughters, also Spanish journalists, Cristina Ónega and Sonsoles Ónega.

He was the Press Director for the government of Adolfo Suárez. He was also the speech writer of Suárez's I can promise and I do promise, which became popular and a symbol of the Transition to democracy. He worked for many newspapers, including Arriba, before he became the Press Director. After his government job, he was back as a radio journalist and was news director at Cadena SER. Between 1986 and 1990 he was news director at COPE and also worked as general manager at another station, Onda Cero, from 1992 and 1993, and again from 2000 and 2002. He also had a television career. He began at TVE, where he directed various programs in the late 1970s. Later, he worked at Telecinco and at Antena 3 in 1997, where he presented the evening news until 1999. From 2019 he was the president of a digital newspaper for senior citizens. 65ymás.com.

Onega died on 3 March 2026, at the age of 78. His funeral was held on 4 March.

== Awards ==
Ónega received three Ondas awards.

On 10 March 2026, the Council of Ministers awarded him posthumously with the Grand Cross of the Order of Civil Merit.
