= Mara Faye Lethem =

Translator and author

- Born: 1971 (age 54–55); New York, United States
- Occupations: Translator, Author
- Writing career
- Genres: Translation, literature, creative and professional writing

Mara Faye Lethem (New York, 1971) is an author and literary translator of Catalan and Spanish into English. She has translated novels by Albert Sánchez Piñol, Gemma Lienas, Albert Espinosa, David Trueba, Javier Calvo Perales, and Patricio Pron, among others. Her translations of short stories and essays have been published in major literary journals and collections like Granta, The Paris Review, The Drawbridge, The Atlantic, Virginia Quarterly Review and The Best American Non-Required Reading 2010.

== Education and awards ==
She holds a bachelor's degree from Macalester College and a master's degree from Rutgers University.

In 2022 she received the Premi Internacional J.B. Cendrós award from Òmnium Cultural for her contributions to Catalan culture through her translations of Catalan works into English.

== Works ==
Mara Faye Lethem has worked extensively as a literary translator. Her recent translation projects include Discontent (2025), The Fake News (2025), and Bad Habits (2024). In the translator's note in Bad Habits, Lethem writes, “I often say that one of the things I love most about being a translator is that I am always learning new things.”

In 2020, she published her debut novel in English, A Person’s a Person, No Matter How Small, which was later translated into Spanish as La llegada del bebé X and into Catalan as Series boja si no ho fessis. The novel is a satire on motherhood that centers around Barbara, a mother of a young child and is expecting another who she calls “Baby X.” The book explores the challenges, rewards, and complex emotions of being a mother.

== Upcoming projects ==
In 2026, Primero Sueño Press announced plans to publish the English translation of Sara Torres’ novel The Seduction, translated by Mara Faye Lethem.

== Translations ==
- Discontent (Descontento) (2025)
- The Fake News (La musa fingida) (2025)
- I Gave You Eyes and You Looked Toward Darkness (Et vaig donar ulls i vas mirar les tenebres) (2025)
- Bad Habits (La mala costumbre) (2024)
- Napalm in the Heart (Napalm al cor) (2024)
- The Seven Deadly Sins (Els set pecats capitals) (2022)
- When I Sing, Mountains Dance (Canto jo i la muntanya balla) (2022)
- In the Neighborhood (Història d'un veïnat) (2022)
- Other People's Beds (Els llits dels altres) (2022)
- The Adventures and Misadventures of the Extraordinary and Admirable Joan Orpí, Conquistador and Founder of New Catalonia (Aventures i desventures de l'insòlit i admirable Joan Orpí, conquistador i fundador de la Nova Catalunya) (2021)
- Come On Up (Puja a casa) de Jordi Nopca (2021)
- The Book of Barcelona (Antologia) de Empar Moliner y Francesc Serés (2021)
- Learning to Talk to Plants (Aprendre a parlar amb les plantes) de Marta Orriols Balaguer (2020)
- Brother in Ice (Germà de gel) de Alícia Kopf (2018)
- Max and the Superheroes (Max i els superherois) de Rocio Bonilla Raya (2018)
- The Last Son’s Secret (La maledicció dels Palmisano) de Rafel Nadal Farreras (2017)
- La decisió de Brandes (Brande’s decision) de Eduard Márquez (2016)
- The Boys (Els nois) de Toni Sala (2015)
- Barcelona Shadows (La mala dona) de Marc Pastor (2014)
- Confessions (Jo confesso) de Jaume Cabré (2014)
- Pandora in the Congo (Pandora al Congo) de Albert Sánchez Piñol (2008)

== Books ==
- La llegada del bebé X (2020)

== Upcoming Projects ==
- The Seduction by Sara Torres (2026)
