= Alfonso Grosso =

Spanish writer (1928–1995)

Alfonso Grosso Ramos (1928-1995) was a Spanish writer. He won the Premio de la Crítica for his novel Guarnición de Silla (1970) and the Premio Alfaguara for his autobiographical novel Florido mayo (1973).

== Selected filmography ==
- Goya, a Story of Solitude (1971)
