= Nocilla Generation =

Spanish writers' literary movement

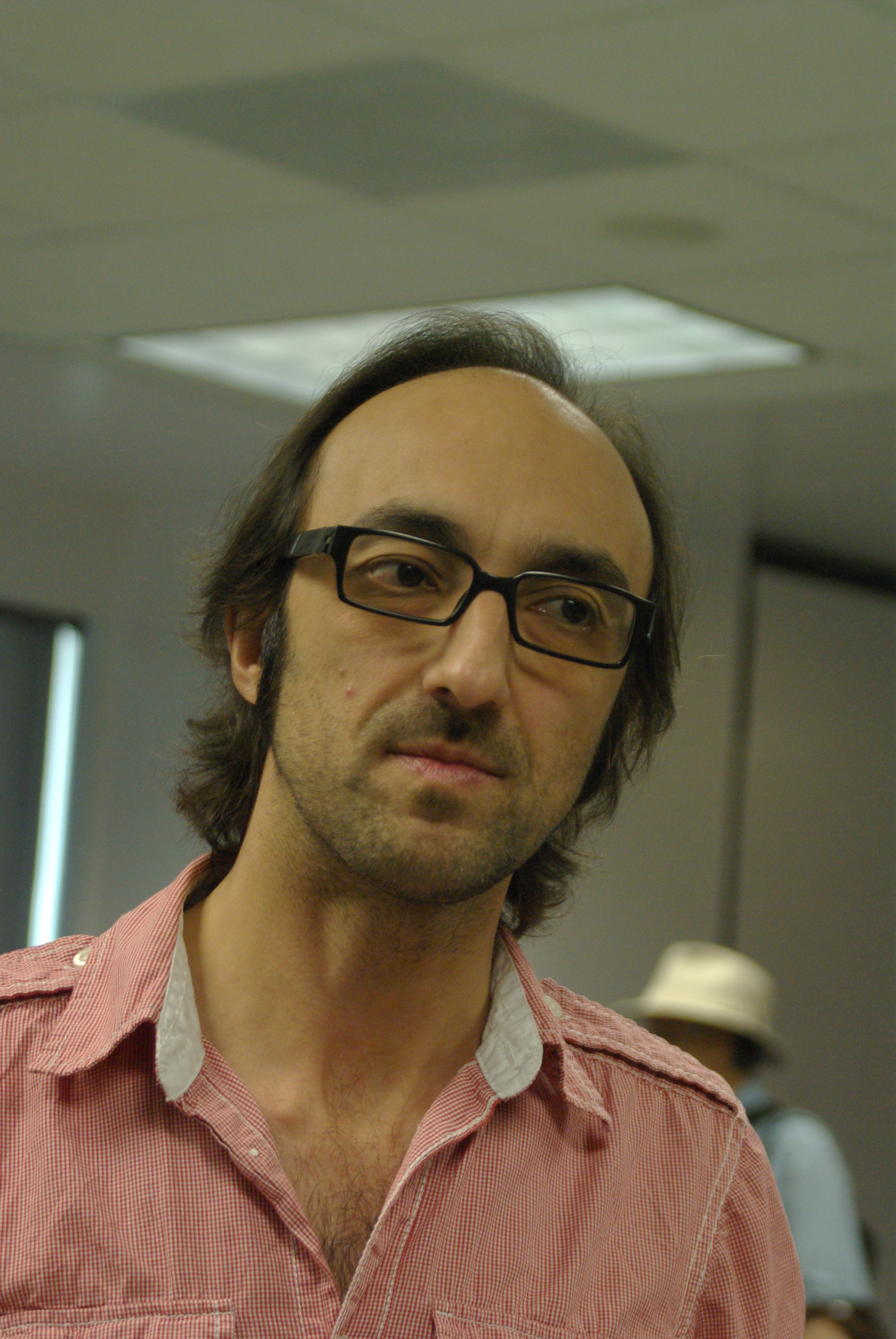
Agustín Fernández Mallo at the Miami Book Fair in 2011.

The Nocilla Generation, which is sometimes called Afterpop, is a literary movement referring to a group of Spanish writers born between 1960 and 1976.

The name is taken from a trilogy of novels by Agustín Fernández Mallo (La Coruña, 1967), the Nocilla Trilogy, itself inspired by the song "Nocilla ¡Qué Merendilla!" (Nocilla, What a Great Snack!) by the Galician punk band Siniestro Total. Nocilla is a hazelnut and chocolate spread, similar to Nutella. The journalists Elena Hevia and Nuria Azancot first used the term to refer to a group of writers that came together on June 26–28, 2007, at the Atlas Literario Español in Seville, a new-writers conference organised and promoted by the publisher Seix-Barral and the José Manuel Lara Foundation.

Eloy Fernández Porta scorned the Nocilla Generation label, preferring to explain the literary movement within his own critical theory in his essay Afterpop (Berenice, Córdoba, 2006). According to Fernández Porta, it is an aesthetic that responds to the social conditions created by the symbolic excesses of mass media, and that it is not something generational, national or specifically literary. Vincente Luis Mora refers to the movement as The New Light.

== Characteristics ==
Literary characteristics of the movement include: fragmentation, interdisciplinarity, emphasis on the over-saturation of pop culture amongst the Spanish youth at the beginning of the 21st century, and the contrasting of so-called 'high culture' with that pop culture. It is referred to as "zapping literature", populated by a large number of characters who come and go without understanding why or the outcomes. Collage, appropriation of texts in the name of the "noble art of recycling", and stories with open structures that begin without knowing when to end, are all also common. Many of the writers create hybrid literary genres and publish literature online through blogs. Decidedly nonconformist, they publish with small-press publishers and denounce conventional literature. They make efforts to distinguish themselves from what they call "the commercial or late moderns", who cling on to the classical genres and write within conventional modes of literature.

== Authors ==
Authors included under the Nocilla Generation label include: Vicente Luis Mora, Jorge Carrión, Eloy Fernández Porta, Javier Fernández, Milo Krmpotic, Oscar Gual, Mario Cuenca Sandoval, Lolita Bosch, Javier Calvo, Doménico Chiappe, Gabi Martínez, Álvaro Colomer, Harkaitz Cano, Juan Francisco Ferré, Germán Sierra, Diego Doncel, Mercedes Cebrián, Robert Juan-Cantavella, Salvador Gutiérrez Solís, Manuel Vilas and Agustín Fernández Mallo.
