= Alaska y Mario =

- Created by: El Terrat
- Starring: Alaska; Mario Vaquerizo
- Country of origin: Spain
- No. of seasons: 5
- No. of episodes: 38

Production
- Running time: 30 minutes
- Production company: El Terrat

Original release
- Network: MTV Spain (2011–2015); Paramount Network (2018)
- Release: 11 May 2011 – 8 July 2018

Alaska y Mario is a Spanish reality show based on the daily life of Alaska and her husband Mario Vaquerizo. It is produced by El Terrat for Viacom since 2011. The first four seasons aired on MTV Spain, and the fifth season aired on Paramount Network Spain. The show has also been carried on local Spanish-language MTV channels throughout Latin America.

== Development ==
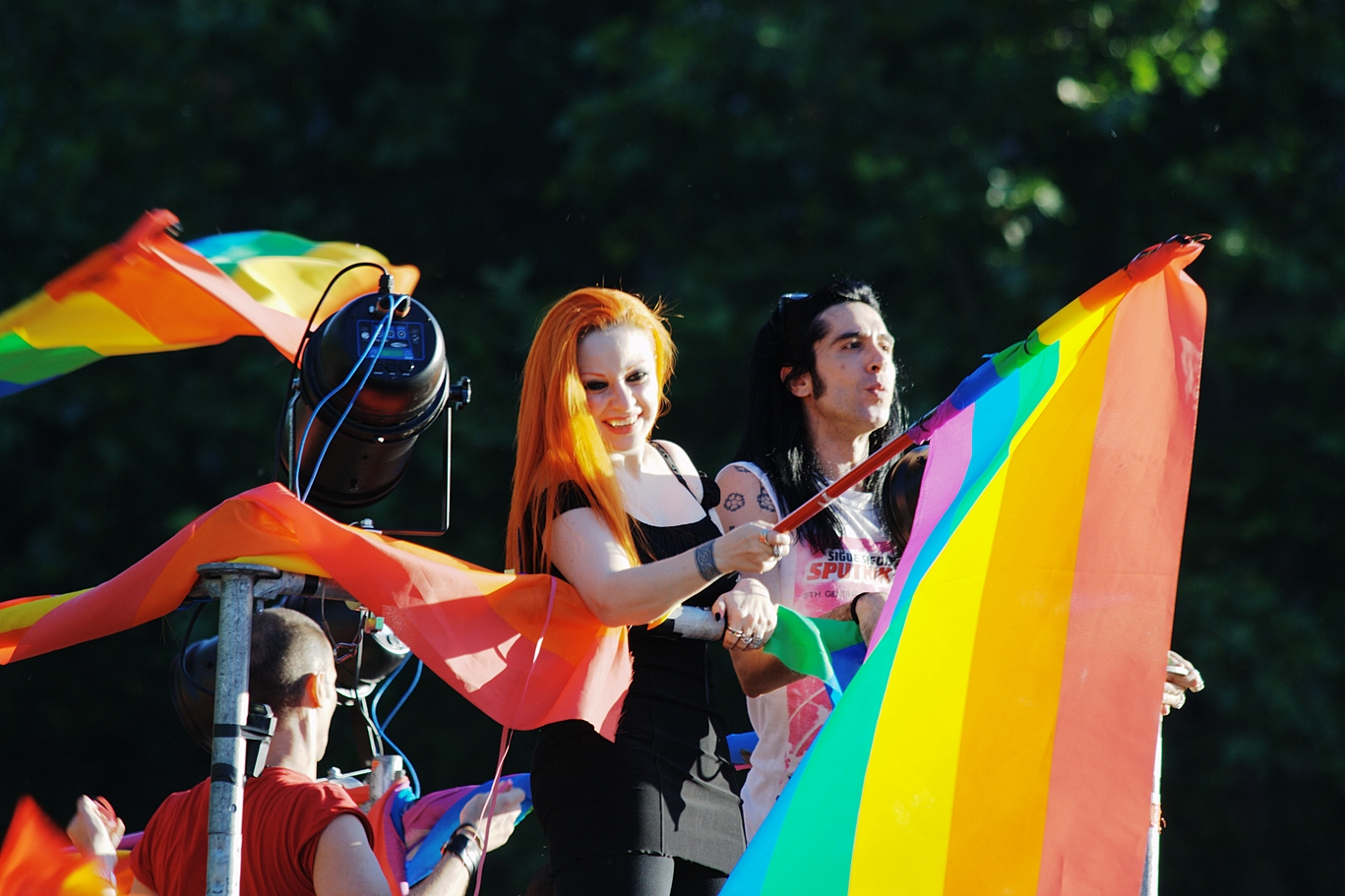
Alaska and Mario at Madrid's Gay pride Parade (2008).

Alaska and Mario Vaquerizo have maintained a serious relationship for 10 years and live together in Madrid, on a street near the Gran Vía. Although they married in 1999 at a wedding chapel in Las Vegas, their marriage was not valid in Spain.

Twelve years later, the couple agreed to produce a reality show series for MTV Spain that would feature the preparations for their second wedding in Madrid. For a period of one month, the daily life of the couple was taped, including their work commitments, and their relationship with family and friends. The couple held two ceremonies: a civil ceremony followed by a family banquet for their relatives, and another ceremony for friends at the rooftop terrace of the Hotel Emperador on Gran Vía. The civil ceremony was held on Friday May 27, 2011. The second season featured their honeymoon in the United States, where they were accompanied by friends. The third season centered on Alaska's 50th birthday party preparations.

The show's tone is casual and kitsch, in accordance with the couple's lifestyle. Although Alaska was already known to the general public, the figure of Mario Vaquerizo rose to fame for his flamboyant and spontaneous behavior, becoming an important TV personality.

== Seasons ==
=== Season 1 ===
The first season featured the daily life of Alaska and Mario Vaquerizo along with their friends, such as Topacio Fresh, Carmen Lomana or Vaquerizo's musical band, Nancys Rubias and their family, such as Alaska's mom, América Jova - among others. Apart from their daily life, the couple decides to celebrate their second wedding but this time in Spain and this season follows how they plan every detail of the wedding and celebration.

=== Season 2 ===
After their second wedding, Alaska and Mario decide to travel to the United States, mainly to Las Vegas where they married for the first time in 1999, but also to Los Angeles, to celebrate their honeymoon, but this time they are accompanied by Nancys Rubias and Topacio Fresh.

But before they leave, they visit their parents (Alaska's mother América Jova, and then Mario's parents) and they perform the song "Absolutamente" with Bimba Bosé in a fashion show for friend designer David Delfín. In the United States, they visit Las Vegas and the Grand Canyon. They also visit Los Angeles at the time when the Academy Awards are being held. Finally, friends Topacio Fresh and Sylvia Superstar celebrate their weddings with their respective grooms in Las Vegas.

=== Season 3 ===
This season mainly centered on the preparations for Alaska's fiftieth birthday party, held at the Florida Park venue in Madrid with several performances of their friend artists.

In addition, partner and friend Topacio Fresh organizes a charity auction where some of Mario and Alaska's objects are auctioned, and Nancys Rubias prepare a music video, directed by Alejandro Amenábar, for their summer release "Me encanta", a cover of Icona Pop's hit song "I Love It". The couple also receives visits at their "pink flat" on Gran Vía: Carmina Barrios and Paco León, Eduardo Casanova and some of the castmembers of Gandía Shore.

=== Season 4 ===
The fourth season centers on Alaska and Mario's summer holidays in various destinations. They visit Sitges with América and Víctor Sandoval, and in Benidorm they meet Belén Esteban. In addition, among other places, they visit Ibiza with their friend Silvia, Galicia with Nancys Rubias, and at the Starlite Festival in Marbella they attend a fashion show with David Delfín and Elena Benarroch.

=== Season 5 ===
The fifth season focuses on Alaska and Mario's origins. They visit Mario's hometown Vicálvaro, right in Madrid, and they travel to Mexico, Alaska's country of birth, together with their friends from Nancys Rubias and Topacio Fresh. The season features guest appearances by Rossy de Palma, Pedro Almodóvar, Loles León, Fabio McNamara, Lolita, Rosario Flores and Elena Furiase and Javier Calvo, Alejandra Bogue, Javier Ambrossi and Brays Efe, among others.

== Main characters ==
=== Alaska ===
Alaska (born 1963), whose real name is Olvido Gara, is a Mexican-Spanish singer, presenter and actress. She debuted in 1976 in the early stages of La Movida Madrileña with the group Kaka de Luxe and she was successful in the 1980s with Alaska y los Pegamoides and Alaska y Dinarama. In addition, she presented the children's show La Bola de Cristal on Televisión Española. Since 1989 she is part of the group Fangoria with Nacho Canut.

=== Mario ===
Mario Vaquerizo (born 1974) is an artist manager who manages the careers of Fangoria, Dover and actress Leonor Watling. He is also the lead singer of glam-band Nancys Rubias. Following the success of Alaska and Mario, public interest in Mario grew, and he began to participate in other television shows such as Pablo Motos's El Hormiguero on Antena 3.

== Seasons ==
Season	Episodes	Premiere	End	Average audience	
Season	Episodes	Premiere	End	Viewers	Percentage
1	8	May 10, 2011	June 22, 2011	227 000	1.3%
2	8	March 18, 2012	May 13, 2012	280 000	1.4%
3	8	May 19, 2013	July 21, 2013	348 000	2.0%
4	8	September 6, 2015	November 1, 2015	52,000	0.3%
5	6	June 10, 2018	July 8, 2018	233,000	1.5%
Total	38	2011	2018	231,000	1.3%

== Audience ==
Season 1: 2011
N.º	Title	Date of issue	Audience
01	Se casan	May 11, 2011	179,000 (0.9%)
02	La dieta	May 18, 2011	237,000 (1.2%)
03	¿Dónde nos casamos?	May 25, 2011	156,000 (0.8%)
04	Burger party	June 1, 2011	174,000 (0.9%)
05	Padres por un día	June 8, 2011	235,000 (1.4%)
06	Ibiza mix	June 15, 2011	240,000 (1.6%)
07	La cuenta atrás	June 22, 2011	365,000 (2.6%)
08	La boda	June 29, 2011	374,000 (2.6%)
Season 2: 2012
01	No sin mis amigos	March 18, 2012	241,000 (1.3%)
02	Absolutamente	March 25, 2012	269,000 (1.3%)
03	El testamento	April 8, 2012	232,000 (1.3%)
04	San Valentín	April 15, 2012	300,000 (1.4%)
05	Nos vamos	April 22, 2012	321,000 (1.6%)
06	Los Ángeles	April 29, 2012	189,000 (1.0%)
07	On the road	May 6, 2012	360,000 (1.8%)
08	Las Vegas, sí quiero	May 13, 2012	326,000 (1.8%)
Season 3: 2013
01	Qué maravilla, Carmina	May 19, 2013	324,000 (1.6%)
02	Qué maravilla, Gandía	May 26, 2013	379,000 (1.9%)
03	Qué maravilla, Star Trek	June 2, 2013	359,000 (1.9%)
04	Qué maravilla, Fangoria	June 9, 2013	412,000 (2.0%)
05	Qué maravilla, Barcelona	June 16, 2013	380,000 (2.2%)
06	Qué maravilla, Las Nancys	June 23, 2013	176,000 (1.1%)
07	Qué maravilla, La subasta	June 30, 2013	364,000 (2.2%)
08	Qué maravilla, Los 50	July 7, 2013	386,000 (2.7%)
Season 4: 2015
01	¡Qué calor!	September 6, 2015	76,000 (0.4%)
02	Vacaciones en Marbella	September 13, 2015	28,000 (0.2%)
03	Vacaciones en Don Viejo	September 20, 2015	27,000 (0.2%)
04	Vacaciones en Barcelona	September 27, 2015	42,000 (0.3%)
05	Vacaciones en Benidorm	October 4, 2015	59,000 (0.3%)
06	Vacaciones en Ibiza	October 11, 2015	85,000 (0.4%)
07	Vacaciones en la Granja escuela	October 18, 2015	61,000 (0.3%)
08	Festival Topichella	November 1, 2015	68,000 (0.5%)
Season 5: 2018
01	Huracán mexicano	June 10, 2018	288,000 (1.7%)
02	Huracán bingo	June 10, 2018	268,000 (1.4%)
03	Huracán camas	June 17, 2018	235,000 (1.4%)
04	Huracán Flores	June 24, 2018	206,000 (1.4%)
05	Huracán maletas	July 1, 2018	186,000 (1.2%)
06	Huracán final	July 8, 2018	223,000 (1.8%)
