= Kiko Amat =

Spanish journalist and novelist

- Born: 1971 (age 54–55); Sant Boi de Llobregat, Spain
- Occupations: Writer, DJ
- Awards: Mandarache Award (2010)

Kiko Amat (born 1971) is a Spanish journalist and novelist who also works as a DJ.

== Biography ==
Kiko Amat left school at 17 and lived in London for five years. He writes periodically on his website Bendito Atraso and, with his brother Uri Amat, edits the fanzine La Escuela Moderna, in addition to DJing with the collective Hungry Beat. He writes critical articles for various media outlets, such as the newspaper La Vanguardia and its supplement Cultura/S, and the magazines GO (until 2005) and Rockdelux.

== Literary career ==
In 2003 he published his first novel with Anagrama, El día que me vaya no se lo diré a nadie, which he defined as "a love story, but somewhat atypical." It narrates the encounters and disagreements of a young overimaginative man with Octavia, the girl who gives voice to the underground. In general it was well received by critics. Among his main influences, the author cited Anglo-Saxon underground authors such as Colin MacInnes and Richard Brautigan. Another of Amat's most important influences is pop music. Referring to his first novel, he said: "I wanted each episode to have the immediacy of some of those three-minute punk rock songs that have had the most impact on me."

In 2007, Kiko Amat's second novel was released, Cosas que hacen BUM, which tells of the fascination of Pànic Orfila with an armed group of anarchist dandies of the Gràcia district (Los Vorticistas) and their explosive plans. Early 2009 saw the publication of his third novel, Rompepistas, about the adolescence of a group of skins and punks in a town on the outskirts of Barcelona in 1987. According to the author's statements, the three books form a trilogy on adolescence and youth.

The critics have classified Kiko Amat as a "pop novelist", linking his literary approach with those of authors such as Javier Calvo, Juan Francisco Ferré, Julián Rodríguez, and Agustín Fernández Mallo. The author, for his part, denies this, and in an interview mentioned Francisco Casavella and Carlos Herrero as similar authors. He won the 2010 Mandarache Award for Rompepistas.

In 2012 he published the novel Eres el mejor, Cienfuegos, a tragicomic portrait of the crisis of the 1940s with the 15-M as a backdrop.

== Works ==
- El día que me vaya no se lo diré a nadie (Anagrama, 2003). ISBN 9788433923912
- Cosas que hacen BUM (Anagrama, 2007). ISBN 9788433923943
- Rompepistas (Anagrama, 2009). ISBN 9788433923950
- L'home intranquil: 35 dies en familia d'un neurotic entusiasta (Columna, 2010). ISBN 9788466412896
- Mil violines (y otras crónicas sobre pop y humanos) (Reservoir Books Mondadori, 2011). ISBN 9788439723356
- Eres el mejor, Cienfuegos (Anagrama, 2012). ISBN 9788433924018
- La soledad del corredor de fondo (contribution to Mercedes Cebrián's translation of The Loneliness of the Long-Distance Runner by Alan Sillitoe. Impedimenta, 2013). ISBN 9788415578369
- Chap, Chap (Blackie Books, 2015). ISBN 9788416290277
- Antes del huracán (Anagrama, 2018). ISBN 9788433938985
