= Juan Francisco Ferré =

Juan Francisco Ferré (born 1962) is a Spanish writer, critic and academic. He was born in Málaga, obtained a doctorate, and taught Hispanic Studies in the USA. He belongs to the Nocilla Generation. Others writers in this group are Vicente Luis Mora, Jorge Carrión, Eloy Fernández Porta, Javier Fernández, Milo Krmpotic, Oscar Gual, Mario Cuenca Sandoval, Lolita Bosch, Javier Calvo, Doménico Chiappe, Gabi Martínez, Álvaro Colomer, Harkaitz Cano, Germán Sierra y Fernández Mallo.

== Novels ==
- La vuelta al mundo (Jamais, Sevilla, 2002)
- I love you Sade (E.D.A. Libros, Málaga, 2003)
- La fiesta del asno (DVD Ediciones, Barcelona, 2005)
- Providence (Editorial Anagrama, Barcelona, 2009)
- Karnaval (Editorial Anagrama, Barcelona, 2012)
- La vuelta al mundo (Edición ampliada. Pálido Fuego, Málaga, 2015)

Karnaval won the Premio Herralde in 2012.
