= Mystery-box show =

Television series with complex plots based on mysterious secrets

In episodic television, the term mystery box or puzzle box refers to a form of storytelling and genre of high concept fiction that features large and complex stories based on enigmatic happenings and secrets, with multiple interlocking sub-plots and sets of characters that eventually reveal an underlying mythos that binds everything together. The Guardian defined it as "the idea of narrative as an endlessly open puzzle-box of allusions and intimations that simultaneously invites and resists exegesis". Slate summarized the idea as being that "the mystery is more enjoyable than the revelation".

Lost and The X-Files have been cited as early examples of mystery-box television. The 1960s series The Fugitive and The Invaders have also been cited as early pioneers of the genre. Other examples of the mystery-box genre include The Good Place, Dark, Fringe, Westworld, The OA, Heroes, Manifest, 1899, Severance, Stranger Things, Yellowjackets, Carnivale, and From. Pluribus, although sometimes described as a mystery box, has also been described as a rejection of the mystery-box structure.

J. J. Abrams and Damon Lindelof have been cited as examples of creators of multiple mystery-box shows.

== Reception ==
Mystery-box shows have attracted both critical praise and criticism.

Supporters of the format argue that it offers an immersive and participatory viewing experience. According to Vulture, series such as Lost, Westworld, and The Leftovers exemplify how ambiguity and layered storytelling can create "mystery-box TV shows, less about genre and more about structure and ambiguity," encouraging audiences to speculate and form theories long after each episode airs. Author Colin Barrett agreed that mystery-box narratives offered a participatory element, but wrote, "Facilitated by social media and online fan forums, every reader and viewer who so desires has the chance to posit themselves as critic, theorist, prophet and de facto co-writer. When stories don't add up, the speculation can go on for ever."

Individual programs have also been singled out for acclaim. The New Yorker praised Yellowjackets for combining survivalist mystery with a psychological exploration of trauma, noting that its dual timelines allowed for "richly realized performances" and deep character arcs beyond its central puzzle.

However, the format has also been widely criticized for being difficult to sustain. ScreenRant argued that mystery-box storytelling is "one of the hardest [genres] to get right on television," as extended intrigue often leads to viewer dissatisfaction when answers are delayed or fail to meet expectations. Colin Barrett argued that the mystery box is "purpose built to not add up" and called the style "self-consciously labyrinthine and reflexive meta-narratives that end, when they can be said to end at all, in irresolution, deferral and ellipsis".

The format has also been criticized as being ultimately predictable. Forrest Wickman of Slate argued that, in the case of J. J. Abrams, "the not-so-well–kept secret of [...] mystery boxes is that they tend to contain ... pretty much exactly what you expect." Entertainment Weekly described the story of Westworld season 1 as a mystery box but assessed that "it was so well plotted that fans were able to guess all of the twists before they were actually revealed".

== Legacy and influence ==
The popularity of mystery-box storytelling in television is often associated with the work of J. J. Abrams and Damon Lindelof, particularly following the success of Lost. Abrams had previously articulated the concept of the "mystery box" in a 2007 TED Talk, framing it as a metaphor for narrative suspense that keeps audiences engaged through withheld information and delayed revelation. In his TED Talk, Abrams described being inspired by a "mystery magic box" he purchased at Tannen's Magic Shop in New York City and kept closed for 35 years, explaining that is represents "infinite possibility".

This approach influenced subsequent prestige television series, including Fringe, Westworld, and The Leftovers, all of which employed serialized mysteries and interwoven mythologies. Outside the United States, European productions such as the German series Dark and 1899 adapted the format to local storytelling traditions while retaining the genre's emphasis on puzzles and layered timelines.

The genre's legacy is visible in the continuing wave of high-concept serialized dramas that emphasize world-building and audience speculation. Programs such as Stranger Things, Severance, and From have been described as inheritors of the mystery-box tradition, though they also reflect ongoing debates about whether such storytelling can balance intrigue with narrative resolution.

The mystery-box approach has also been said to apply to other storytelling mediums such as films, including the films directed by Abrams, Cloverfield (2008), Super 8 (2011), Star Trek Into Darkness (2013), Star Wars: The Force Awakens (2015), and has also been applied to the marketing strategy of those films. It has also been used to describe narratives in literary fiction, including Jeff VanderMeer's Southern Reach trilogy, Agustín Fernández Mallo's Nocilla sequence, John Darnielle's novel Universal Harvester, Susanna Clarke's Piranesi, Ellen Raskin's The Westing Game, the work of fantasy novelist Brandon Sanderson and the work of Japanese writer Haruki Murakami, including The Wind-Up Bird Chronicle and 1Q84.

In a 2019 interview with Rolling Stone, ahead of the release of his film Star Wars: The Rise of Skywalker, Abrams reflected on mystery-box storytelling: "It's not a driving force at all. I'm not actively thinking, "How do I employ mystery-box strategy to this story?" What I meant was just that a good story makes you want to understand what's going on, what makes it tick, what's inside. And it was my friend and talented producer Bryan Burk who, when I was trying to figure out what the hell I was going to talk about at the Ted Talk, said, "Why don't you talk about that box you have?"" When asked if the term was "overblown" as it applies to his work, Abrams responded: "I never think about it, so whenever someone brings it up, I'm always like, "Oh, yeah, that thing." It's not to say I still don't feel like a good story forces you to ask a question. But an ending needs to be, by definition, conclusive."
