= Hirigoyen =

Hirigoyen is a surname of Basque origin, with the highest global occurrence in the South French province of Aquitaine. Variants include "Yrigoyen" and "Irigoyen". Notable people with the surname include:

- Ignacio Hirigoyen (born 1976), Argentine tennis player
- Marie-France Hirigoyen (born 1949), French psychiatrist
- William Hirigoyen (1898–1962), French athlete
- Hipólito Yrigoyen (1852-1933), Argentine statesman and two-time President of Argentina.
- Bernardo de Irigoyen (1822-1906) Argentine lawyer, diplomat, and politician.
