= Carta blanca =

- Created by: TVE
- Country of origin: Spain
- Original language: Spanish

Production
- Running time: 1 hour and 30 minutes

Original release
- Release: 24 May – 16 November 2006

Carta blanca (White card) is a TVE television programme, developed by Santiago Tabernero, written by María Carrión, Borja Echebarría and Paco Tomás, produced by Gloria Concostrina and broadcast by TVE2 and TVE Internacional, in which a guest selects several other guests for interviews and/or performances.

== Programmes ==
Number	Date	Main guest	Other guests
1.1	24-05-2006	Elvira Lindo	Juan Luis Arsuaga, Joan Albert Amargós, Concha Buika, Javier Cámara, Laura García Lorca, Alberto Iglesias, Miguel Poveda.
1.2	01-06-2006	Alejandro Jodorowsky	Adanowsky, Marianne Costa, Alberto García-Alix, Beatriz Preciado, Àlex Rovira, Santiago Segura.
1.3	08-06-2006	Alaska	Arakis, Manu Arregui, Carles Congost, Tomás Crespo, La Terremoto de Alcorcón, Rafael Doctor, Ramón Fano, Topacio Fresh, Miguel Ángel Gaüeca, Roberta Marrero, La Prohibida, Sabrina Sabrok, Manuel Toledano, Laura Valor, Mario Vaquerizo, Álvaro Villarubia, John Waters, Carmen Xtravaganza.
1.4	15-06-2006	Juan Tamariz	
1.5	22-06-2006	Sergi Arola	Amaya Arzuaga, Carlos Jean, Eduardo Noriega, Guillermo del Toro.
2.1	21-09-2006	Rafael Amargo	María José Álvarez, Antonio Canales, María Carmona, Jacobo Conde, Patrick de Bana, Dnoe, Vanesa Gálvez, Jesús Rafael García, Ludovico Hombrabella, Antonio Jiménez Maya, Yolanda Jiménez, María la Coneja, Maite Maya, Rubén Olmo, Dani Pannullo, Esther Ponce, Flavio Rodrigues, María Victoria Rodríguez, José Sorderita, Miguel Vallés.
2.2	28-09-2006	Ray Loriga	Marlango, Agustín Díaz Yanes, Christina Rosenvinge, Enrique Vila-Matas.
2.3	05-10-2006	Lucía Etxebarria	Silvia Abascal, Chenoa, Silvia Grijalda, Marie-France Hirigoyen, Silvia Marsó, Ana María Matute, Celia Nzang Mba, Marta Sanz, Imma Turbau.
2.4	12-10-2006	Antonio Escohotado	Javier Andreu, Luis Eduardo Aute, Bebe, José Luis Díez Ripollés, Joan Carles March, Albert Pla, Lluís Racionero.
2.5	19-10-2006	Isabel Coixet	John Berger, Maria de Medeiros, Carlos Fuentes, Rodrigo Leão, Benedetta Tagliabue.
2.6	26-10-2006	Amparanoia	Víctor Coyote, Tiken Jah Fakoly, Pitingo, Arianna Puello.
2.7	02-11-2006	David Trueba	Accidents Polipoètics, John Carlin, Forges, Jabier Muguruza, Rob Riemen, Bebo Valdés.
2.8	09-11-2006	La Terremoto de Alcorcón	Asier Etxeandia, Mayra Gómez Kemp, Paco León, Merche Mar, The Chanclettes.
2.9	16-11-2006	Resumen	
