= Málaga Novel Prize =

Spanish literary award

The Málaga Novel Prize is a literary award organized by the Málaga City Council since 2005 and endowed with a prize of €18,000. Unpublished novels written in Spanish that have not previously won any other award, written by authors of any nationality, are eligible for the prize.

== Jury ==
Chaired by the Málaga City Council's Councilor for Culture, since 2020, several names in Spanish culture have been regularly cited: Pilar Adón, Luis Alberto de Cuenca, Eva Díaz, Antonio Soler, Alfredo Taján, and Alberto Olmos.

== List of winners ==
- 2005 – Miguel Mena with Días sin tregua
- 2006 – Pablo Aranda with Ucrania
- 2007 – Eduardo Jordá with Pregúntale a la noche
- 2008 – José Ángel Cilleruelo with Astro desterrado
- 2009 – José Luis Ferris with El sueño de Whitman
- 2011 – Sara Mesa with Un incendio invisible
- 2013 – Eva Díaz Pérez with Adriático
- 2014 – Luis Manuel Ruiz with Temblad villanos
- 2015 – Herminia Luque Ortiz with Amar tanta belleza
- 2016 – María Tena with El novio chino
- 2017 – Antonio Fontana, with Sol poniente
- 2018 – Adolfo García Ortega with Una tumba en el aire
- 2020 – Alberto de la Rocha with Los años radicales
- 2022 – Joaquín Pérez Azaústre with El querido hermano
- 2023 – Mario Cuenca Sandoval with Aurora Q.
