= Javier Calvo =

Javier Calvo may refer to:

- Javier Calvo (writer) (born 1973), Spanish writer
- Javier Calvo (actor) (born 1991), Spanish actor
