= Tasting Menu (film) =

- Theatrical release poster
- Catalan: Menu degustació
- Directed by: Roger Gual
- Written by: Roger Gual; Javier Calvo
- Story by: Silvia González Laá
- Produced by: David Matamoros; Tristan Orpenlynch; Aoife O'Sullivan
- Starring: Jan Cornet; Claudia Bassols; Vicenta Ndongo; Andrew Tarbet; Togo Igawa; Fionnula Flanagan; Stephen Rea; Marta Torné; Santi Millán; Nancys Rubias
- Cinematography: Emili Guirao
- Edited by: Alberto de Toro
- Music by: Stephen McKeon
- Production companies: Zentropa Spain; Subotica
- Distributed by: Alfa Pictures (es)
- Release dates: April 2013 (Málaga); 14 June 2013 (Spain)
- Running time: 84 minutes
- Countries: Spain; Ireland
- Languages: Catalan; Spanish; English; Japanese

Tasting Menu (Catalan: Menú degustació) is a 2013 Spanish-Irish comedy film directed by Roger Gual. It stars Jan Cornet and Claudia Bassols. Vicenta Ndongo, Andrew Tarbet, Togo Igawa, Fionnula Flanagan, and Stephen Rea appear in supporting roles. It is set in a restaurant of the Costa Brava. It features dialogue in Catalan, Spanish, English, and Japanese.

== Cast ==
- Jan Cornet as Marc
- Claudia Bassols as Rachel
- Vicenta Ndongo as Mar
- Fionnula Flanagan as Comptessa
- Stephen Rea as Walter
- Togo Igawa as Ishao
- Andrew Tarbet as Max
- Marta Torné as Mina
- Akihiko Serikawa as Yoshio
- Timothy Gibbs as Daniel
- Santi Millán as Presentador
- Andrea Ros as Paula
- Andrés Herrera as Ramón
- Iván Morales as Edu
- Marc Rodríguez as Hidalgo
- Nancys Rubias as Músics

== Release ==
The film premiered at the Málaga Film Festival in April 2013. Distributed by Alfa Pictures, it was released in Spain on June 14, 2013. In April 2013, it was announced that Magnolia Pictures acquired U.S. distribution rights to the film. The film was released in U.S. theaters on April 18, 2014.

This film, translated by Andrey Efremov, was shown in Moscow, Russia, as part of the 35th Moscow International Film Festival in June 2013.

== Reception ==
The film has a 17% rating on Rotten Tomatoes based on 18 reviews.

Susan Wloszczyna of RogerEbert.com awarded the film two stars and wrote, "Yet nothing truly creates any emotional waves, and little seems at stake, no matter what potential disaster might seem to be in the offing."

Justin Chang of Variety gave the film a negative review and wrote, "This relentlessly mediocre ensemble dramedy features several of the least compelling dinner guests in recent memory."

Clayton Dillard of Slant Magazine awarded the film half a star out of four and wrote, "There’s a sinister, even insidious quality to a film that insists upon using incessant food montages not as a source of passion, but fodder for class-based self-congratulation."

Mike D'Angelo of The A.V. Club graded the film a D+ and wrote, "Among other demerits, this is the rare foodie movie that doesn’t seem to care much about food."

Jonathan Holland of The Hollywood Reporter also gave the film a negative review and wrote, "Deliberately insubstantial, sometimes savory, sometimes tasteless and ultimately dissatisfying, Tasting Menu is the filmic equivalent of its title."

== See also ==
- List of Spanish films of 2013
