= Spain in the Eurovision Song Contest 1994 =

- Eurovision Song Contest 1994
- Participating broadcaster: Televisión Española (TVE)
- Country: Spain
- Selection process: Internal selection
- Announcement date: Artist: 3 March 1994; Song: 24 March 1994

Competing entry
- Song: "Ella no es ella"
- Artist: Alejandro Abad
- Songwriter: Alejandro Abad

Placement
- Final result: 18th, 17 points

Participation chronology

Spain was represented at the Eurovision Song Contest 1994 with the song "Ella no es ella", written and performed by Alejandro Abad. The Spanish participating broadcaster, Televisión Española (TVE), internally selected its entry for the contest. The song, performed in position 21, placed eighteenth out of twenty-five competing entries with 17 points.

== Before Eurovision ==
Televisión Española (TVE) internally selected "Ella no es ella" written and performed by Alejandro Abad as its entry for the Eurovision Song Contest 1994. The title of the song and the singer-songwriter were announced on 3 March 1994. The song was presented on 24 March.

== At Eurovision ==
On 30 April 1994, the Eurovision Song Contest was held at the Point Theatre in Dublin hosted by Raidió Teilifís Éireann (RTÉ), and broadcast live throughout the continent. Abad performed "Ella no es ella" 21st in the running order, following Austria and preceding Hungary. Josep Llobell conducted the event's orchestra performance of the Spanish entry. At the close of the voting "Ella no es ella" had received 17 points, placing 18th of 25 entries.

The contest was broadcast on La Primera, with commentary by José Luis Uribarri. Before the event, TVE aired a talk show hosted by Ángeles Martín introducing the Spanish jury, which continued after the contest commenting on the results.

=== Voting ===
TVE assembled a jury panel with sixteen members. The following members comprised the Spanish jury:

- Belén Casla Benito – economist
- Daniel Santos Morales – 'Network' delegate
- Purificación Blanco – journalist
- Àlex Sisteré – actor
- Susana García – actress
- Andrés Vázquez – bullfighter
- Alejandra Botto – actress
- Serafín Zubiri – singer, represented Spain in 1992
- Elena Benarroch – fashion designer
- Francisco – singer, two-time winner of the OTI Festival for Spain, in 1981 and 1992
- Dora-Dora – drag persona of Joan Monleón
- Francisco Herrera – director of Cadena Dial
- Victoria Rodríguez de Miguel – student
- Manuel Liétor – businessman
- Sofía Balseiro – bank branch manager
- Javier de la Vega – student

The jury was chaired by Manuel Corral, deputy director of communication at TVE, with María Ángeles Balañac as spokesperson. These did not have the right to vote, but the president decided in the event of a tie. The jury awarded its maximum of 12 points to Portugal.

Points awarded to Spain
Score	Country
12 points	
10 points	
8 points	Greece
7 points	
6 points	
5 points	Romania
4 points	
3 points	
2 points	France; Slovakia
1 point	

Points awarded by Spain
Score	Country
12 points	Portugal
10 points	Ireland
8 points	Germany
7 points	Bosnia and Herzegovina
6 points	Iceland
5 points	Norway
4 points	Cyprus
3 points	United Kingdom
2 points	Switzerland
1 point	Sweden
