= Txema Salvans =

Spanish photographer

Txema Salvans (born 28 November 1971) is a Spanish photographer, based in Barcelona. He "specialises in making documentary work about Spain and the Spanish people"; people that "inhabit those unloved semi-industrial landscapes of sun-baked Mediterranean Spain." His work "speak[s] to us about an isolated humanity". To access his subjects Salvans often uses a large format technical camera mounted on a tripod, and wears a hi-viz jacket.

== Life and work ==
Salvans was born in Barcelona. He spent his youth aspiring to be a biologist and spent some years studying biology. Later he received a grant and went to New York City to study at the International Center of Photography, after which he returned to Spain to work as a photographer.

Nice to Meet You (2010) is a book of photographs of families along Spain's Mediterranean coast.

The Waiting Game (2013) is a book of photographs of sex workers on the margins of highways in Spain. "A typical image shows a woman waiting for a client in the middle of a rural crossroads under a hazy, sun-seared sky." Having initially been commissioned by a newspaper to make a few photographs of female sex workers in Catalonia, he adopted the Cambo Wide large format film camera (usually used for architecture, landscape and automotive photography), and a hi-viz jacket. "To ensure the women continued to work in his presence, Salvans disguised himself as a topographer, someone who uses a camera to survey the lay of the land", "working with an assistant holding a surveyor's pole". He has said "Then, simply what I did was to approach the girls to say 'Look, I'll be around here for a while near my van.'" He has said "I am not interested in the morphological characteristics of people but in their interaction with space; the context". The project took six years to make.

The Waiting Game II (2018), also made along the Mediterranean coast, shows fishermen waiting for fish to bite. David Campany has written that "Salvans and the people he observes so carefully inhabit those unloved semi-industrial landscapes of sun-baked Mediterranean Spain. [. . .] Salvans' previous series was also about life in the gaps and at the edges. It showed lone women, probably prostitutes, sitting or standing in very similar landscapes to the ones you see here. In this book the figures are by water. In the previous book, they are by roads."

My Kingdom (2018) "originally grew out of Nice to Meet You, and shows Spanish people and families relaxing on the Mediterranean coast", paired with "texts taken from speeches by King Juan Carlos I." Salvans has said it "is a book about power rather than about Spain, the Spanish, or King Juan Carlos I."

Perfect Day (2020) shows "people sunbathing or relaxing in industrial landscapes", "a catalogue of the more surreal spots chosen by Spanish holidaymakers along the country's increasingly overcrowded shores"; "landscape [photographs] without losing the focus of the human". The "main scenario is that of the unvisited Mediterranean coast. Not that of postcards; that of questionable urban planning, the factories with solemn cement chimneys and the abandoned umbrellas." Il Post said "In the introduction to the project the photographer Joan Fontcuberta explains that a paradox emerges from the Perfect Day photos : "We who look at the photographs are denied the opportunity to see what the subjects of the photographs want to see (the sea, ed ), while this what gets thrown in our faces is what they don't want to see."" Salvans has said "I think the more complex the liturgy of taking the picture, the less people seem to get angry. Maybe if you put a mobile phone on him he would be annoyed, but seeing me with a yellow vest and a technical camera on a tripod, he thinks he isn't even looking at them. It's as if I wasn't there". He worked on the series for 15 years.

== Publications ==
- Nice to Meet You. Barcelona: Actar D, 2010. ISBN 978-8495951700. A brief text by Guillem Martinez precedes each group of photographs.
- The Waiting Game. Mexico: RM, 2013. ISBN 978-8415118572. With texts by Martin Parr and John Carlin.
- The Waiting Game II. RM, 2018. ISBN 978-8416282913. With texts by David Campany and Gabi Martínez.
- My Kingdom. London: Mack, 2018. ISBN 978-1-910164-85-3.
- Perfect Day. London: Mack, 2020. ISBN 978-1912339686. With a text by Joan Fontcuberta.

== Awards ==
- 2005: Best Photography Book, National Category, PHotoEspaña, Madrid, for Nice to Meet You
