= Cebrián =

Cebrián is a Spanish surname, derived from the medieval given name Cebrián (from the Latin Cyprianus, which was originally given to people from Cyprus). Notable people with the surname include:

- Alicia Cebrián (born 1983), Spanish sports sailor
- David Cebrián (born 1991), Spanish racing driver
- Elisabeth Cebrián (born 1971), Spanish basketball player
- Fernando Cebrián (1929–2009), Spanish actor
- Juan Luis Cebrián (born 1944), Spanish journalist and businessman
- Mercedes Cebrián (born 1971), Spanish writer and translator
- Pedro Cebrián, 5th Count of Fuenclara (1687–1752), Spanish diplomat and viceroy of New Spain
