= Susie Pop =

Spanish transgender electro-pop performer

Background information
- Born: 6 April 1975; Seville, Spain
- Died: 23 November 2008 (aged 33) Madrid, Spain
- Cause of death: Suicide by jumping
- Instruments: Vocals; guitar
- Formerly of: Nancys Rubias

Susie Pop or Susi Pop (6 April 1975 – 23 November 2008) was a Spanish singer, guitarist and member of the rock band Nancys Rubias (English: Blonde Nancies). She was a fixture of the Madrid nightlife in the 1990s countercultural scene before cofounding the Nancys Rubias in 2004, in which she was known as "The Real Nancy Rubia" (Spanish: La verdadera Nancy Rubia). Susie Pop died by suicide in 2008.

== Biography ==
Susie Pop was assigned male at birth. After relocating from Seville to Madrid, she took the name Susie. Along with her close friend and fellow singer Luisito Pop, also known as Putirecords, she became a fixture of the Madrid nightlife, often frequenting establishments such as Xenón and Voltereta. She helped rejuvenate the 1990s countercultural scene, an outgrowth of the movement known in the 1980s as La Movida Madrileña. At the end of the 1990s, Susie Pop often attended Fangoria concerts wearing her signature large picture hat. At that time, Fangoria had recently gained prominence with the release of their second album Una temporada en el infierno.

Susie Pop became close friends with the singer Mario Vaquerizo in 1999, as well as the singer Alaska, who is his wife. In June 2003, at Alaska's fortieth birthday party, Susie did a lip sync performance of "Happy House" by Siouxsie and the Banshees. She spent time as a member of a troupe of female dancers that performed at Fangoria concerts, called "Ballet Special K".

=== Nancys Rubias ===
In 2004, Susie Pop teamed up with Mario Vaquerizo, Juan Pedro, and Miguel Balanzategui to found the electro pop band Nancys Rubias. With hits such as "Sálvame", "Corazón de Hielo", and "Di que Sí", the group went on to record three albums under the DRO Records label (purchased by Warner Music Group in 1993). The other three bandmates were known as Anorexic Nancy, Travesti Nancy, and Nancy Reagan, while Susie Pop was known as The Real Nancy Rubia.

Mariano Prunes said of the group: "Conceived at the spur of the moment as a novelty act/inner joke, Nancys Rubias take their ironic obsession with kitsch, androgynous sexuality, bubblegum punk, and disco to the point of self-parody."

== Discography ==
With Nancys Rubias:

- 2005 Nancys Rubias
- 2007 Gabba Gabba Nancys
- 2009 Una Cita Con Nancys Rubias

== Death ==
Susie Pop was found dead on the morning of 23 November 2008, after throwing herself off the Segovia Viaduct, near the Royal Palace of Madrid. She was 33 years old at the time.
