= Marie-France Hirigoyen =

French psychiatrist and psychotherapist

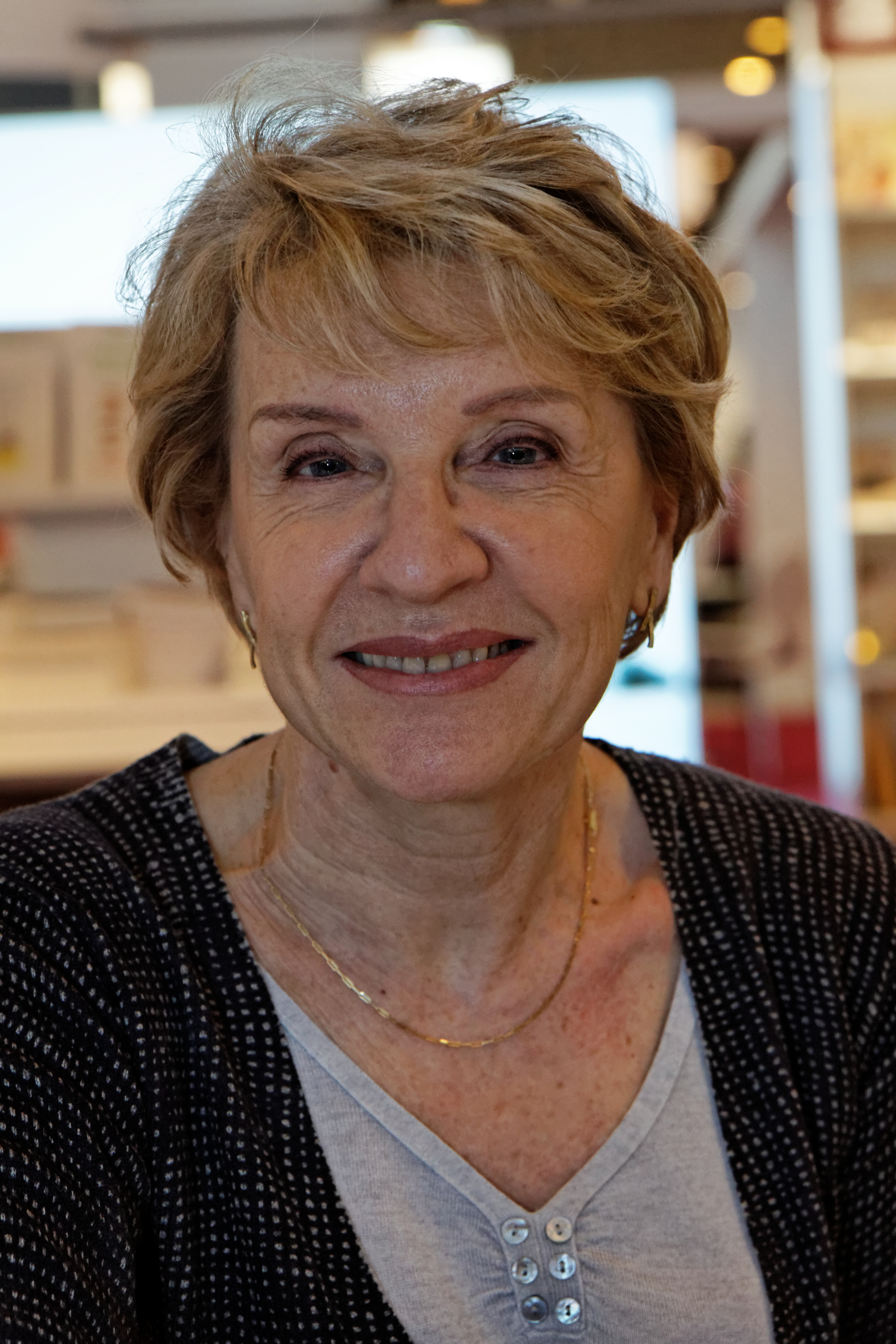
Marie-France Hirigoyen at the Paris Book Fair 2012.

Marie-France Hirigoyen (born 1949) is a French psychiatrist, psychoanalyst and psychotherapist specialising in mobbing, a form of bullying. Her interest in stress led her in the mid-1980s into victimology, a branch of criminology. She later turned her attention to workplace stress generated by mobbing behaviour.

Her publications include Le harcèlement moral, la violence perverse au quotidien (1998), which sold 450,000 copies in her native France and was translated and sold in 24 other countries. She has made several television appearances in France, and in 2006 she was invited onto the Spanish Television programme Carta blanca by guest presenter Lucía Etxebarría.
