= Vicenta Ndongo =

Spanish actress

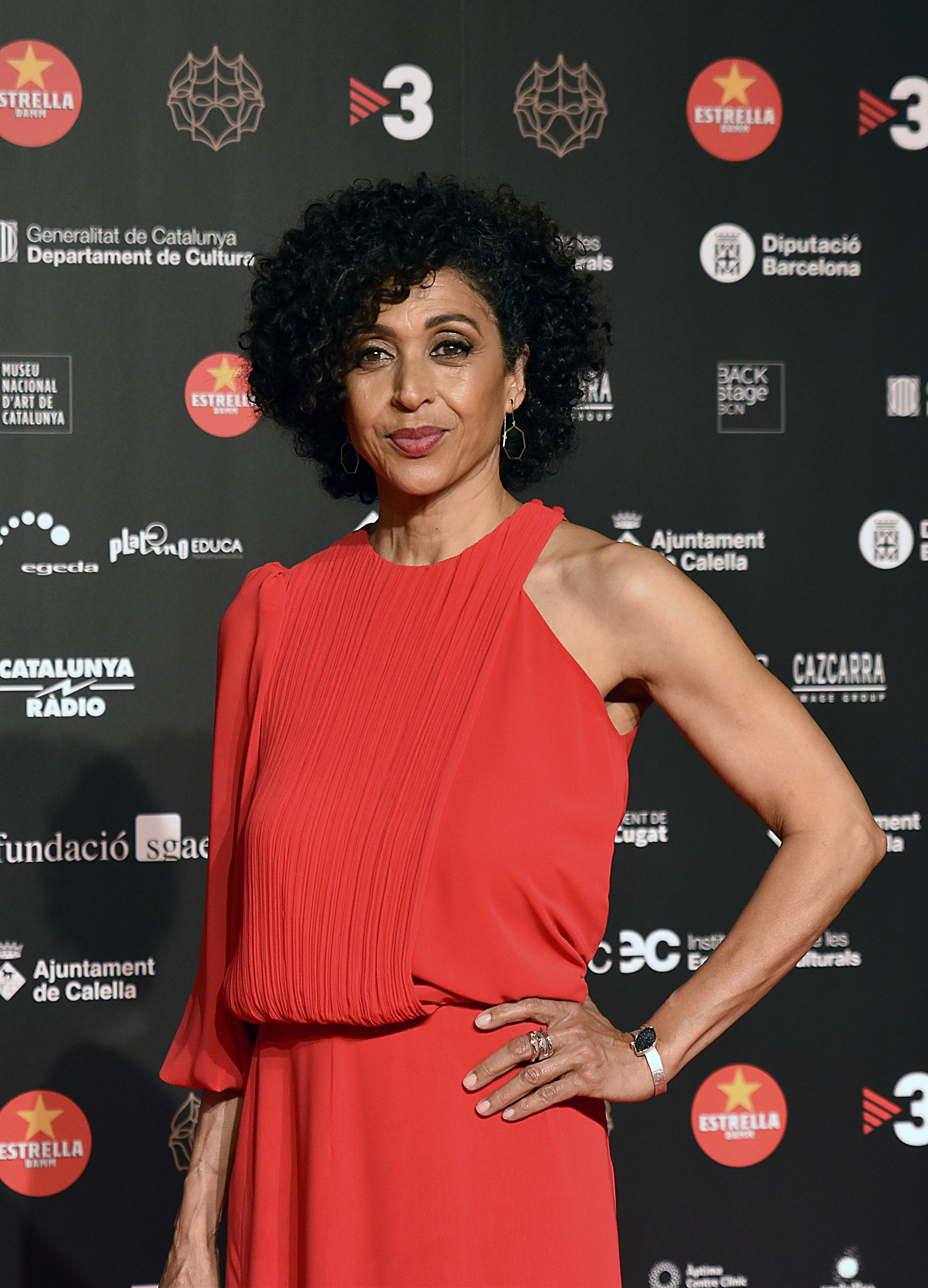
- Ndongo in 2022
- Born: 23 February 1968 (age 58); Barcelona, Spain
- Other name: Vicenta N'Dongo
- Education: Institut del Teatre
- Occupation: Actress
- Awards: Premis Nacionals de Cultura (2024)

Vicenta Ndongo (born 23 February 1968) is a Spanish actress. She earned early public recognition for her role in Airbag.

== Biography ==
Born on 23 February 1968 in Barcelona, she is of Equatoguinean descent. She graduated in acting from the Barcelona's Institut del Teatre. Some of her early film credits include a performance in the 1995 Catalan-language film El perquè de tot plegat (1995) and that of Vanessa in Airbag (1997), which earned her public recognition. She also featured in Los lobos de Washington (1999) and No News From God (2001).

She landed roles in Cesc Gay's films In the City (2003) and V.O.S (2009), for which she earned a CEC Medal nomination for Best Supporting Actress, also starring alongside Alex Brendemühl in the 2007 drama Lo bueno de llorar.

Her television work include roles in both Catalan and Spanish-language series such as Hermanas, 7 vidas, Compañeros, Dinamita, Aquí no hay quien viva, and Com si fos ahir. In 2022, she joined the cast of the streaming series Días mejores.

== Filmography ==
=== Film ===
Year	Title	Role	Notes	Ref.
1997	Airbag	Vanessa		
2003	Ilegal	María		
2003	En la ciudad (In the City)	Sara		
2005	Ar meno un quejío (If Only a Lament)	Luna		
2007	Lo bueno de llorar	Vera		
2009	V.O.S	Vicky		
2013	Menu degustació (Tasting Menu)	Mar		
2022	Mensajes privados	Vicenta		
2022	Mantícora (Manticore)			
2024	El salto (Jumping the Fence)	Elena Jiménez		

=== Television ===
Year	Title	Role	Notes	Ref.
1998	Hermanas	Cleofé		
1999	7 vidas	Estefanía	Introduced in season 2	
2004	Aquí no hay quien viva	Rocío		
2022	Días mejores (When You Least Expect It)	Carmen		
2025	Olympo	Isabel Durán		
