= Serial (radio and television) =

Continuing plot that unfolds in a sequential episode-by-episode fashion

In television and radio programming, a serial is a show that has a continuing plot that unfolds in a sequential episode-by-episode fashion. Serials typically follow main story arcs that span entire television seasons or even the complete run of the series, and sometimes spinoffs, which distinguishes them from episodic television that relies on more stand-alone episodes. Worldwide, the soap opera is the most prominent form of serial dramatic programming. In the United Kingdom, the first serials were direct adaptations of well-known literary works, usually consisting of a small number of episodes.

Serials rely on keeping the full nature of the story hidden and revealing elements episode by episode, to encourage spectators to tune in to every episode to follow the plot. Often these shows employ recapping segments at the beginning and cliffhangers at the end of each episode.

The invention of recording devices such as VCRs and DVRs along with the growing popularity of streaming services has made following this type of show easier, which has resulted in increased success and popularity. Prior to the advent of DVRs, television networks shunned serials in prime time as they made broadcast programming reruns more difficult and television producers shunned them because they were tougher to go into broadcast syndication years down the road.

Serials contrast with episodic television, with plots relying on a more independent stand-alone format. Procedural drama television programs are commonly episodic, sometimes including a serial subplot.

Shorter serial programs known as telenovelas (and earlier, radionovelas), originating and often produced in Spanish- and Portuguese-speaking Latin America, have become popular worldwide.

== Terminology ==
The term "serial" refers to the intrinsic property of a series – namely its order. In literature, the term is used as a noun to refer to a format (within a genre) by which a story is told in contiguous (typically chronological) installments in sequential issues of a single periodical publication.

More generally, "serial" is applied in library and information science to materials "in any medium issued under the same title in a succession of discrete parts, usually numbered (or dated) and appearing at regular or irregular intervals with no predetermined conclusion."

The term has been used for a radio or television production with a continuously evolving, unified plot and set of characters, spread over multiple episodes. In the United States, daytime soap operas have long had a serial structure. Television mini-series also commonly come in a serial form. Starting in the mid-1970s, series with soap opera-like stories began to be aired in prime time (e.g. Dallas, Dynasty). In the 1990s, shows like The X-Files and The Sopranos began to use a more serial structure, and now there are a much wider range of shows in serial form.

== History ==
The serial began with the advent of movie serials of the early 20th century. With the emergence of television and subsequent decline of the movie-going audience, production of movie serials ceased due to the decreasing revenues. But the serial lived on, moving instead to the small screen and the world of Broadcast syndication television reruns.

=== Soap operas ===
The television serial format as known today originated in radio, in the form of children's adventure shows and daily 15-minute programs known as soap operas (so-called because many of these shows were sponsored by soap companies, such as Colgate-Palmolive and Procter & Gamble). Soap operas were specifically engineered to appeal to women (with the intention of increasing sale of soap). They usually ran from Monday through Friday at the same time every day. A show called The Smith Family which ran only one night a week on WENR in Chicago during the early 1930s was credited as the "great-granddaddy of the soap operas" by radio historian Francis Chase, Jr. One of the other shows that helped pioneer the daytime soap opera/serial was The Guiding Light, which debuted on NBC radio in 1937, and then switched to CBS Television in 1952. The Guiding Light's final episode aired on September 18, 2009, having a total of 15,762 episodes air on CBS. Some of the characters in soap operas have been portrayed as long-suffering (a common theme even in some of today's serials along with the social and economical issues of the day).

Children's adventure serials were more like film serials, with continuing characters involved in exploits with episodes that often ended in a cliffhanger situation; Westerns were a particularly popular format for children's serials on the radio.

Guiding Light and such other daytime television program serials such as Search for Tomorrow, Love of Life, The Secret Storm, As the World Turns, The Edge of Night, The Doctors, Another World, Dark Shadows, One Life to Live, and All My Children were popular in the Golden and Silver Ages of television and still are today.

Aside from the social issues, the style and presentation of these shows have changed. Whereas in the 1950s and 1960s the drama was underscored with traditional organ music, and in the 1970s and the 1980s a full orchestra provided the score, the daytime dramas of today use cutting-edged synth-driven music (in a way, music for soaps has come full-circle, from the keyboard to the keyboard).

The nighttime serials are a different story, though the concept is also nothing new. In the 1960s, ABC aired the first real breakthrough nighttime serial, Peyton Place, inspired by the novel and theatrical film of the same name. After its cancellation, the format went somewhat dormant until Norman Lear produced Mary Hartman, Mary Hartman in 1976. In 1977, ABC created another comedy soap (aptly called Soap). Although the show was controversial for its time (with a homosexual character among its cast roster), it was (and still is today) a cult classic.

The success of Dallas popularized serial storylines on prime-time television. Its end-of-season cliffhangers, such as "Who shot J. R.?" and "Bobby in the Shower?", influenced other shows like Dynasty (ABC's answer to Dallas), Knots Landing, Falcon Crest, The Colbys, Flamingo Road, Hotel, The Yellow Rose, Bare Essence, and Berrenger's. There were some serial shows such as Hill Street Blues and St. Elsewhere that did not officially fit into this category, but were nonetheless ratings hits season after season.

While the last of the 1980s nighttime soaps ended during the first years of the following decade, then a second wave came with series like Beverly Hills, 90210, Melrose Place, Models, Inc., Savannah and Central Park West. But as the 1990s came to a close, the primetime soap as an official format gradually faded away, where it largely seems to remain as of the middle of the first decade of the 21st century in the United States.

=== Other dramas ===
In the 1990s, American serial dramas included Twin Peaks, Star Trek: Deep Space Nine and Babylon 5. The trend continued in the 2000s with 24. Cable networks also produced serial dramas such as The Sopranos, Battlestar Galactica, Dexter, The Wire, Breaking Bad and its spin-off Better Call Saul.

Series such as Buffy the Vampire Slayer, Veronica Mars, Homicide: Life on the Street, The Good Wife, The X-Files and Damages fall somewhere between, featuring self-encapsulated plots that are resolved by the end of each episode, but also having overarching plots that span multiple episodes. The more serialized its storytelling, the less likely a show is to fare well in repeats. The format places a demand on episodes to be run in order, without which story arcs stretching over many episodes may be difficult for new viewers to delve into. Desperate Housewives also falls into the category while each season involves a new mystery that spans an entire season (and on one occasion, half the season) while planting hints throughout the episodes until the climax in the finale.

To a lesser extent, series such as House and Fringe may also feature ongoing story arcs, but episodes are more self-encapsulated and so the series fall into a more conventional drama category. Fringe has experimented with "myth-alones", a hybrid that attempts to advance the story arc in a self-contained episode.

In addition, it has been noted that the use of cliffhangers is still prevalent in adventure shows; however, they are now typically used just before a commercial break and the viewer need only wait a few minutes to see its resolution. In addition, many series have also made extensive use of the traditional end-of-episode cliffhanger format. This is most common in season finales which often end in a cliffhanger that would only be resolved in the next season's premiere.

Over the course of its run, a show may change its focus. Matt Cherniss, executive vice president of programming at Fox says: "Sometimes early on, being a little more episodic allows more people into the room. And as the show goes on, by its nature, it might find itself becoming a little more serialized." Early in their runs, shows such as Lost, Buffy, Angel, Dollhouse and Torchwood put greater emphasis on the "story-of-the-week", but over time story arcs begin to dominate. In contrast, Alias became more focused on standalone stories in later seasons, because of pressures by network executives.

== Effect of a serial model on commercial success ==
Complex story arcs may have a negative effect on ratings by making entry more difficult for new viewers as well as confusing fans who have missed an episode. Networks see them as riskier than dramas that focus on a self-contained story of the week. Tom O'Neil of the Los Angeles Times notes: "They're chancy because these shows are hard to join midway through." As of 2012 CBS has not aired a serial drama in many years, in part because of the success of its non-serial procedurals. Marketing for Star Trek: Strange New Worlds (2022) emphasized its episodes being standalone, which cast and crew described as being similar to Star Trek: The Original Series.

Scott Collins of the Los Angeles Times stated that "serialized storytelling ... though popular with hard-core fans and many critics, requires more dedication from viewers and has almost certainly tamped down ratings for many shows". He quoted an ad executive who states that close-ended story lines "[make] it easier for new viewers to tune in and figure out what's going on". According to Dick Wolf, serialized elements also make it more difficult for viewers to return to a show if they have missed some episodes. Cheers co-creator Les Charles regrets helping to make serialization common: "[W]e may have been partly responsible for what's going on now, where if you miss the first episode or two, you are lost. You have to wait until you can get the whole thing on DVD and catch up with it. If that blood is on our hands, I feel kind of badly about it. It can be very frustrating."

Another problem is that many fans prefer to record these shows and binge watch the whole season in one session. These viewers are not included in TV ratings as they are much less likely to watch commercials than live viewers. The move away from live viewing and toward DVR or internet-streaming services has hurt many shows' prospects because there are fewer or no commercials and they may be fast-forwarded or out-of-date.

Concerned about the toll on ratings of complex story arcs, networks sometimes ask showrunners to reduce serialization. Network executives believe that standalone episodes serve as a better jumping on point for new viewers, although this may result in a conflict with regular watchers who tend to prefer more focus on story arcs. Alias began as a more serialized show but later became more stand-alone under network pressure. During season 3 of the re-imagined Battlestar Galactica, showrunner Ronald D. Moore was also pressured to make episodes more stand-alone. This move resulted in negative criticism from both fans and critics, and Moore revealed in the Season 3 finale podcast that the network finally accepted that standalone episodes simply do not work for the story he is trying to tell. Moore has also stated that the network was reluctant to greenlight Caprica mainly because story-arc-heavy series notoriously have difficulty in picking up new viewers, as compared to a series composed of mostly standalone episodes.

According to Todd A. Kessler, the second season of Damages will be less serialized in order to render the show more accessible to new viewers. Tim Kring, creator of Heroes, has also suggested that his show may move away from serialized storytelling: "I think the show needs to move towards [standalone episodes] in order to survive."

Networks also discourage complex story arcs because they are less successful in reruns, and because standalone episodes can be rerun without concern for order.

Entertainment Weekly and Chicago Tribune have expressed concern that declining ratings may lead to a major reduction in serialized storytelling. To highlight the situation, in the 2006–2007 season, no fewer than five high-concept serials were introduced, including Jericho, Kidnapped, Vanished, The Nine, and Drive, all of which experienced fairly quick cancellation due to low ratings. In 2010 and 2011, more high-profile, high-cost serials failed to achieve success, including V, The Event, and FlashForward.

Some reviewers have also noted that serialized dramas are at a disadvantage at major awards shows such as the Primetime Emmy Awards. Such shows generally have to submit an atypical self-contained episode in order to gain recognition. Despite this, since 2000, every winner of the Primetime Emmy Award for Outstanding Drama Series has been a Serial Drama: The West Wing (2000–2003), The Sopranos (2004, 2007), Lost (2005), 24 (2006), Mad Men (2008–2011), Homeland (2012), Breaking Bad (2013–2014), Game of Thrones (2015–2016, 2018–2019), The Handmaid's Tale (2017), Succession (2020, 2022–2023), The Crown (2021), and Shōgun (2024).

In terms of DVD sales, however, strongly serialized shows often perform better than shows which are strongly procedural. 24 (Season 6), Lost (Season 4), Heroes (Season 2), True Blood and even ratings minnow Battlestar Galactica (Season 4.0) sell significantly more units than hit procedurals such as CSI (Season 6), NCIS (Season 3, Season 5), CSI: Miami (Season 4, Season 5) and Criminal Minds (Season 2, Season 3).

Serialized shows tend to develop a more dedicated fanbase interested in exploring the show online as well as becoming customers of additional merchandising.

== See also ==
- Limited-run series
- List of serial drama television series
- Mystery box show
- Serial film
