= List of serial drama television series =

This is a list of serial drama television series. A serial is a television show which has a continuous plot that unfolds in sequential episode-by-episode fashion. Serials are, more often than not, shows that possess narrative complexity. They typically follow many story arcs that span entire television seasons, or even in some cases, the entire run of the series.

== # ==
- 3% (2016–2020)
- 7th Heaven (1996–2007)
- 12 Monkeys (2015–2018)
- 13 Reasons Why (2017–2020)
- 24 (2001–2010, 2014)
- 24: Legacy (2017)
- The 100 (2014–2020)
- 666 Park Avenue (2012–2013)
- 2000 Malibu Road (1992)
- The 4400 (2004–2007)
- 90210 (2008–2013)

== A ==
- The Act (2019)
- The Affair (2014–2019)
- Agents of S.H.I.E.L.D. (2013–2020)
- Akame ga Kill! (2014)
- Alcatraz (2012)
- Alex Rider (2020–2024)
- Alias (2001–2006)
- The Alienist (2018–2020)
- Almost Human (2013–2014)
- Altered Carbon (2018–2020)
- American Crime Story (2016–2021)
- American Gods (2017–2021)
- American Horror Story (2011–present)
- American Soul (2019–2020)
- The Americans (2013–2018)
- American Vandal (2017–2018)
- Andor (2022–2025)
- Andromeda (2000–2005)
- Angel (1999–2004)
- Anohana: The Flower We Saw That Day (2011)
- Another Life (2019–2021)
- Aquarius (2015–2016)
- Arcane (2021–2024)
- Arrow (2012–2020)
- Ash vs Evil Dead (2015–2018)
- Attack on Titan (2013–2023)
- Avatar: The Last Airbender (2005–2008)
- Awake (2012)

== B ==
- Babylon (2014)
- Babylon 5 (1993–1998)
- Babylon Berlin (2017–present)
- Baccano! (2007)
- Ballers (2015–2019)
- Band of Brothers (2001)
- Banshee (2013–2016)
- Barry (2018–2023)
- Bates Motel (2013–2017)
- Battlestar Galactica (2004–2009)
- Berserk (1997–1998)
- Better Call Saul (2015–2022)
- Beverly Hills, 90210 (1990–2000)
- The Big C (2010–2013)
- Big Little Lies (2017–2019)
- Big Love (2006–2011)
- Billions (2016–2023)
- The Black Donnellys (2007)
- The Blacklist (2013–2023)
- Black Monday (2019–2021)
- Black Sails (2014–2019)
- Blindspot (2015–2020)
- Blood+ (2005–2006)
- Bloodline (2015–2017)
- Blood of Zeus (2020–2025)
- Boardwalk Empire (2010–2014)
- The Borgias (2011–2013)
- Bosch (2014–2021)
- Boss (2011–2012)
- The Boys (2019–2026)
- BrainDead (2016)
- Breaking Bad (2008–2013)
- The Bridge (2013–2014)
- Bridgerton (2020–present)
- Broadchurch (2013–2017)
- Brotherhood (2006–2008)
- Brothers & Sisters (2006–2011)
- Buffy the Vampire Slayer (1997–2003)

== C ==
- Canaan (2009)
- Cane (2007)
- Caprica (2010)
- Carnival Row (2019–2023)
- Carnivàle (2003–2005)
- Castle Rock (2018–2019)
- Castlevania (2017–2021)
- Catch-22 (2019)
- Catherine the Great (2015)
- Central Park West (1995–1996)
- Chained Soldier (2024–present)
- Chernobyl (2019)
- Classroom of the Elite (2017–present)
- Claymore (2007)
- The Client (1995–1996)
- Cobra Kai (2018–2025)
- Code Geass (2006–2008)
- Code of a Killer (2015)
- Colony (2016-2018)
- The Comeback (2014)
- Continuum (2012–2015)
- Counterpart (2017–2019)
- Courthouse (1995)
- Cowboy Bebop (1998–1999)
- Crash (2008–2009)
- Crime Story (1986–1988)
- Cross Ange (2014–2015)
- The Crossing (2018)
- The Crown (2016–2023)
- Crusade (1999)

== D ==
- Dallas (1978–1991)
- Dallas (2012–2014)
- Damages (2007–2012)
- Danganronpa 3: The End of Hope's Peak High School (2016)
- Danganronpa: The Animation (2013)
- Daredevil (2015–2018)
- Dark (2017–2020)
- The Dark Crystal: Age of Resistance (2019)
- Dark Matter (2015–2017)
- Das Boot (2018–present)
- Dawson's Creek (1998–2003)
- Daybreak (2019)
- Deadwood (2004–2006)
- The Dead Zone (2002–2007)
- Death Note (2006–2007)
- Deep State (2018–2019)
- Defying Gravity (2009)
- Designated Survivor (2016–2019)
- Desperate Housewives (2004–2012)
- The Deuce (2017–2019)
- Devs (2020)
- Dexter (2006–2013)
- Dirt (2007–2008)
- Dirty John (2018–2020)
- Dirty Sexy Money (2007 - 2009)
- Dispatches from Elsewhere (2020)
- Dollhouse (2009–2010)
- Dominion (2014–2015)
- Downton Abbey (2010–2015)
- Dracula (2020)
- Dynasty (1981–1989)
- Dynasty (2017–2022)

== E ==
- Catherine (2014–2023)
- El Chapo (2017-2018)
- Eli Stone (2008–2009)
- Elite (2018–2024)
- Emergence (2019–2020)
- Empire (2015–2020)
- The End of the F***ing World (2017–2019)
- Euphoria (2019–2026)
- The Event (2010–2011)
- Everwood (2002–2006)
- Evil (2019–2024)
- The Exorcist (2016–2017)
- The Expanse (2015–2022)
- Extant (2014–2015)

== F ==
- The Falcon and the Winter Soldier (2021)
- Falcon Crest (1981–1990)
- Falling Skies (2011–2015)
- Fallout (2024–present)
- Fargo (2014–present)
- Farscape (1999–2003)
- Fear the Walking Dead (2015–2023)
- Feud (2017)
- The Five (2016)
- FlashForward (2009–2010)
- The Following (2013–2015)
- For All Mankind (2019–present)
- Foundation (2021–present)
- Frequency (2016–2017)
- Friday Night Lights (2006–2011)
- Fringe (2008–2013)
- The Future Is Wild (2007–2008)

== G ==
- Game of Thrones (2011–2019)
- Gavin & Stacey (2007–2010, 2019, 2024)
- Gen V (2023–2025)
- Gilmore Girls (2000–2007)
- The Girl from Tomorrow (1991–1993)
- GLOW (2017–2019)
- Godless (2017)
- Goliath (2016–2021)
- Good Girls (2018–2021)
- Good Omens (2019)
- The Good Wife (2009–2016)
- Gossip Girl (2007–2012)
- Grey's Anatomy (2005–present)
- Griselda (2024)
- Gurren Lagann (2007)

== H ==
- Halt and Catch Fire (2014–2017)
- The Handmaid's Tale (2017–2025)
- Hannibal (2013–2015)
- Harlots (2017–2019)
- Harper's Island (2009)
- Heartland (2007–present)
- Helix (2014–2015)
- Hell on Wheels (2011–2016)
- Heroes (2006–2010)
- Heroes Reborn (2015–2016)
- Highschool of the Dead (2010)
- High Seas (2019–2020)
- His Dark Materials (2019–2022)
- Homeland (2011–2020)
- Hope Street (2021–present)
- Hostages (2013–2014)
- House of Cards (2013–2018)
- House of the Dragon (2022–present)
- How to Get Away with Murder (2014–2020)
- Humans (2015–2018)
- Hunters (2020–2023)
- Hyperion Bay (1998–1999)

== I ==
- The I-Land (2019)
- The Increasingly Poor Decisions of Todd Margaret (2010–2016)
- Into the Badlands (2015–2019)
- In Treatment (2008–2010)
- Inuyasha (2000–2004, 2009–2010)
- Invasion (2005–2006)
- Invincible (2021–present)

== J ==
- Jack Ryan (2018–2023)
- Jeremiah (2002–2004)
- Jericho (2006–2008)
- Jessica Jones (2015–2019)
- Joan of Arcadia (2003–2005)
- Justified (2010–2015)

== K ==
- Kabaneri of the Iron Fortress (2016–2019)
- Kidding (2018–2020)
- Kidnapped (2006–2007)
- The Killing (2011–2014)
- Killing Eve (2018–2022)
- Killjoys (2015–2019)
- Kill la Kill (2013–2014)
- Kings (2009)
- The Knick (2014–2015)
- Knightfall (2017–2019)
- Knight Rider (1982–1986)
- Knots Landing (1979–1993)
- Krypton (2018–2019)
- Kyle XY (2006–2009)

== L ==
- Last Exile (2003–2011)
- The Last Kingdom (2015–2022)
- The Last of Us (2023–present)
- Last Resort (2012–2013)
- The Last Ship (2014–2018)
- The Leftovers (2014–2017)
- The Legend of Korra (2012–2014)
- Legion (2017–2019)
- Lexx (1997–2002)
- Life on Mars (U.K.) (2006–2007)
- Life on Mars (U.S.) (2008–2009)
- Lilyhammer (2012–2014)
- Line of Duty (2012–2021)
- Demon Slayer: Kimetsu no Yaiba (2016–2020)
- Living with Yourself (2019)
- Locke & Key (2020–2022)
- Loki (2021–2023)
- The Looming Tower (2018)
- Lost (2004–2010)
- The Lottery (2014)
- Lovecraft Country (2020)
- Luck (2011–2012)
- The L Word (2004–2009)

== M ==
- Mad Men (2007–2015)
- The Magicians (2015–2020)
- Manhattan (2014–2015)
- Manhunt (2017–2020)
- Maniac (2018)
- Manifest (2018–2023)
- The Man in the High Castle (2015–2019)
- Mare of Easttown (2021)
- Marianne (2019)
- The Marvelous Mrs. Maisel (2017–2023)
- Masters of Sex (2013–2016)
- Masters of the Universe: Revelation (2021)
- Mayans M.C. (2018–2023)
- Medici (2016–2019)
- Melrose Place (2009–2010)
- Melrose Place (1992–1999)
- The Messengers (2015)
- Millennium (1996–1999)
- A Million Little Things (2018–2023)
- Mindhunter (2017–2019)
- Misfits (2009–2013)
- The Mist (2017)
- Monster (2004–2005)
- The Morning Show (2019–present)
- Mr. Robot (2015–2019)
- Mrs. Fletcher (2019)
- Murder One (1995–1997)

== N ==
- The Name of the Rose (2019)
- Narcos (2015–2017)
- Narcos: Mexico (2018–2021)
- Nashville (2012–2018)
- Neon Genesis Evangelion (1995–1996)
- The Newsroom (2012–2014)
- The Night Of (2016)
- Nikita (2010–2013)
- The Nine (2006–2007)
- Nip/Tuck (2003–2010)
- Noir (2001)
- Nowhere Man (1995–1996)
- Nurse Jackie (2009–2015)

== O ==
- The O.C. (2003–2007)
- The OA (2016–2019)
- On Becoming a God in Central Florida (2019)
- Once Upon a Time (2011–2018)
- Once Upon a Time in Wonderland (2013–2014)
- One Tree Hill (2003–2012)
- Orange Is the New Black (2013–2019)
- The Order (2019–2020)
- Origin (2018)
- The Originals (2013–2018)
- Orphan Black (2013–2017)
- Our Friends in the North (1996)
- Outlander (2014–2026)
- The Outsider (2020)
- Oz (1997–2003)
- Ozark (2017–2022)

== P ==
- Parenthood (2010–2015)
- Party of Five (1994–2000)
- Peacemaker (2022–2025)
- Peaky Blinders (2013–2022)
- Penguindrum (2011)
- Penny Dreadful (2014–2016)
- Pennyworth (2019–2022)
- Person of Interest (2011–2016)
- Persons Unknown (2010)
- Picnic at Hanging Rock (2018)
- The Playboy Club (2011)
- Point Pleasant (2005)
- Poldark (2015–2019)
- The Politician (2019–present)
- Power (2014–2020)
- Preacher (2016–2019)
- Pretty Little Liars (2010–2017)
- Primal (2019–present)
- Prison Break (2005–2017)
- Profit (1996)
- Project Blue Book (2019–2020)
- Psycho-Pass (2012–2013)
- Puella Magi Madoka Magica (2011)
- The Punisher (2017–2019)
- The Purge (2018–2019)

== Q ==
- Queer as Folk (US) (2000–2005)
- Queer as Folk (UK) (1999–2000)
- The Queen's Gambit (2020)

== R ==
- The Rain (2018–2020)
- Ratched (2020)
- Ravenswood (2013–2014)
- Ray Donovan (2013–2020)
- Rectify (2013–2016)
- Reign (2013–2017)
- Rescue Me (2004–2011)
- Resurrection (2014–2015)
- The Returned (2015)
- Reunion (2005)
- Revenge (2011–2015)
- Revolution (2012–2014)
- The Riches (2007–2008)
- Ringer (2011–2012)
- Ripley (2024)
- Ripper Street (2012–2016)
- The River (2012)
- Riverdale (2017–2023)
- Rome (2005–2007)
- Roswell (1999–2002)
- Roswell, New Mexico (2019–2022)
- The Royals (2015–2018)
- Rubicon (2010)
- Russian Doll (2019–2022)

== S ==
- Salem (2014–2017)
- Salvation (2017–2018)
- Scandal (2012–2018)
- Scream Queens (2015–2016)
- The Secret Circle (2011–2012)
- Secret Diary of a Call Girl (2007–2011)
- The Secret Life of the American Teenager (2008–2013)
- Secrets & Lies (2014)
- See (2019–2022)
- A Series of Unfortunate Events (2017–2019)
- Seven Seconds (2018)
- Severance (2022–present)
- Shadowhunters (2016–2019)
- Sharp Objects (2018)
- The Shield (2002–2008)
- Show Me a Hero (2015)
- Silo (2023–present)
- The Sinner (2017–2021)
- Six Feet Under (2001–2005)
- The Slap (Australia) (2011)
- The Slap (U.S.) (2015)
- Sleeper Cell (2005–2006)
- Smallville (2001–2011)
- The Society (2019)
- Sons of Anarchy (2008–2014)
- The Sopranos (1999–2007)
- Soul Food (2000–2004)
- Space: Above and Beyond (1995–1996)
- Spartacus (2010–2013)
- The Spy (2019)
- Star Trek: Discovery (2017–2024)
- Star Trek: Picard (2020–2023)
- Star Wars: The Clone Wars (2008–2020)
- The Strain (2014–2017)
- Strange Angel (2018–2019)
- Stranger Things (2016–2025)
- Studio 60 on the Sunset Strip (2006–2007)
- Succession (2018–2023)
- Superman & Lois (2021–2024)
- Swamp Thing (2019)

== T ==
- Taken (2017–2018)
- Teen Wolf (2011–2017)
- Ten Days in the Valley (2017–2018)
- Terminator: The Sarah Connor Chronicles (2008–2009)
- Terra Nova (2011)
- Terriers (2010)
- The Terror (2018–present)
- That's Life (2000–2002)
- This Is Us (2016–2022)
- Threshold (2005)
- Titans (2018–2023)
- Todd McFarlane's Spawn (1997–1999)
- Tokyo Ghoul (2011–2014)
- Tokyo Magnitude 8.0 (2009)
- Top of the Lake (2013–2017)
- Treadstone (2019)
- Treme (2010–2013)
- Triumph Over Evil (1997–1998)
- True Blood (2008–2014)
- True Detective (2014–present)
- The Tudors (2007–2010)
- Twin Peaks (1990–2017)
- Twisted (2013–2014)
- Tyrant (2014–2016)

== U ==
- The Umbrella Academy (2019–2024)
- Unbelievable (2019)
- Underground (2016–2017)
- Under the Dome (2013–2015)
- Undone (2019–2022)

== V ==
- V (2009–2011)
- Valvrave the Liberator (2013)
- The Vampire Diaries (2009–2017)
- Vanished (2006)
- Veronica Mars (2004–2019)
- Victoria (2016–2019)
- Vikings (2013–2020)
- Vinland Saga (2019–2023)
- V Wars (2019)

== W ==
- Waco (2018)
- The Walking Dead (2010–2022)
- WandaVision (2021)
- Warehouse 13 (2009–2014)
- Watchmen (2019)
- Wayward Pines (2015–2016)
- Weeds (2005–2012)
- The West Wing (1999–2006)
- Westworld (2016–2022)
- The Wheel of Time (2021–2025)
- The Whispers (2015)
- The White Princess (2017)
- The White Queen (2013)
- The Widow (2019)
- Wild Palms (1993)
- The Wire (2002–2008)
- The Witcher (2019–present)
- Wolf Creek (2016–2017)
- Wolf Hall (2015)
- Wynonna Earp (2016–2021)

== Y ==
- Years and Years (2019)
- Yellow Peppers (2010–2014)
- Yellowstone (2018–2024)
- You (2018–2025)
- The Young Pope (2016)
- The Young Warriors (2006)

== Z ==
- Z Nation (2014–2018)
- Zero Hour (2013)
