= V.O.S (film) =

- Directed by: Cesc Gay
- Screenplay by: Cesc Gay
- Based on: V.O.S by Carol López
- Starring: Àgata Roca; Paul Berrondo; Andrés Herrera; Vicenta Ndongo
- Cinematography: Andreu Rebés
- Edited by: Frank Gutiérrez
- Music by: Joan Díaz
- Production companies: Imposible Films; Marta Esteban PC; TVC
- Distributed by: Alta Classics
- Release date: 10 July 2009
- Country: Spain
- Languages: Catalan; Spanish; Basque

V.O.S is a 2009 Spanish comedy film directed and written by Cesc Gay adapting the eponymous stage play by Carol López which stars Àgata Roca, Paul Berrondo, Andrés Herrera and Vicenta Ndongo.

== Plot ==
Featuring two women from Barcelona (Clara and Vicky) and two Basque male friends (Manu and Ander), the plot tracks the infatuation of Ander and Clara, the separation of Ander and Vicky and the birth of Clara and Manu's daughter. The dialogue goes back and forth between Catalan, Spanish and some Basque.

== Cast ==
- Àgata Roca as Clara
- Paul Berrondo as Manu
- Andrés Herrera as Ander
- Vicenta Ndongo as Vicky

== Production ==
The film is an adaptation of the stage play of the same name by Carol López. It was produced by Imposible Films, Marta Esteban PC and TVC with support from ICAA, ICEC and Media Desarrollo.

== Release ==
Distributed by Alta Classics, the film was theatrically released in Spain on 10 July 2009.

== Reception ==
Esteve Riambau of Fotogramas gave the film 4 out of 5 stars praising the combination of emotion and reflection as the best thing about the film.

Javier Ocaña of El País considered the film to be a failure, assessing that it only contains a few glimpses of Gay's proven filmmaking ability.

== Premis ==
Year	Award	Category	Nominee(s)	Result	Ref.
2009	24th Mar del Plata International Film Festival	Best Screenplay	Cesc Gay	Won	
2009	24th Mar del Plata International Film Festival	Special Jury Mention		Won	
2010	65th CEC Medals	Best Supporting Actress	Vicenta Ndongo	Nominated	
2010	2nd Gaudí Awards	Best Film		Nominated	

== See also ==
- List of Spanish films of 2009
