= Mercedes Cebrián =

Spanish writer (born 1971)

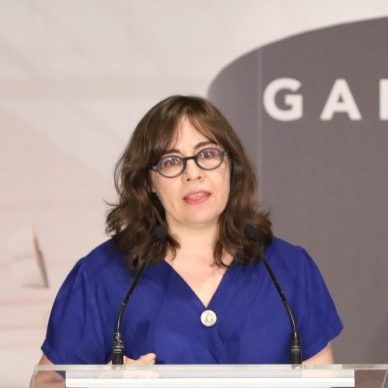
- Born: Mercedes Cebrián Coello; 29 May 1971 (age 55); Madrid, Spain
- Education: University of Pennsylvania
- Occupations: Writer, translator
- Website: www.mercedescebrian.com

Mercedes Cebrián (born 29 May 1971) is a Spanish writer and translator.

== Biography ==
Mercedes Cebrián holds a licentiate in Information Sciences from the Complutense University of Madrid, a master's degree in Hispanic Cultural Studies from Birkbeck, University of London, and one in Hispanic Studies from the University of Pennsylvania.

She was a literary creation scholar at the Residencia de Estudiantes of Madrid from 2002 to 2004 and of Ledig House (Hudson, New York), the Spanish Academy in Rome, the Civitella Ranieri Foundation (Italy), the Valparaíso Foundation (Spain), and the Santa Maddalena Foundation (Italy).

She has written for various media outlets, such as the La Vanguardia supplement Culturas, Babelia and El Viajero of El País, and her texts have appeared in the literary magazines Turia, Eñe, Gatopardo, Revista de Occidente, and Letras Libres, as well as Columbia University's Circumference. She has been a columnist for the newspaper Público.

Cebrián began her writing career with prose, but in the first half of the 2000s she also opted for poetry. In this regard, the author explains:

My contact with the poetic world in Spain came thanks to the scholarship I received from the Residencia de Estudiantes to reside there for 2 years, from 2004 to 2006. I came to write only prose (short story, chronicle ...), and it was at this stage when I got in touch with other young poets (Sandra Santana, Mariano Peyrou ...), with editors, and with well-known poets who passed through the institution. Through all of them I learned about magazines and editors that published poetry. My first publication was in an online magazine. Then I gave a recital together with my classmates in the Residencia, and later I published poems in a "transgenre" book that also included stories.

Her book of short stories and poems El malestar al alcance de todos was published in 2004.

After the publication of La nueva taxidermia, a book that brings together two novellas, Ricardo Senabre from El Cultural commented:

Here is a writer with remarkable doses of originality. Among the authors who have not passed the quarantine, Mercedes Cebrián (Madrid, 1971) stands out for adjusting more than others to one of the canonical principles of literature: the ability to offer new angles of reality, unforeseen views and verbal associations capable of achieving what Fernando de Herrera attributed to poetry as something primordial: that, thanks to the special manipulation of the language that the author practices, common things seem new.

Mercedes Cebrián has been associated with the Nocilla Generation, an evaluation with which she does not agree, although she recognizes that with her "there are points of intersection, such as an interest in talking about the contemporary world."

In 2017 the translator and professor Yolanda Morató accused Mercedes Cebrián and Editorial Impedimenta of the plagiarism of her translation and edition of Georges Perec's Je me souviens (as Me acuerdo). Cebrián denied this outright. She also refused to accept mediation from the Association of Translators, which offered to work out a ruling on the alleged plagiarism if both parties accepted its arbitration. The controversy had an impact on social networks and websites, in cultural journals (such as El Cultural and Estado Crítico), and in the press itself, as well as in translation trade publications, such as that of the Literary Translators Club of Buenos Aires, with input from Jorge Fondebrider.

== Publications ==
- El malestar al alcance de todos, stories and poems, Caballo de Troya, Madrid, 2004, ISBN 9788499890241
- Mercado común, poems, Caballo de Troya, Madrid, 2006, ISBN 9788496594043
- 13 viajes in vitro, chronicles, Blur Ediciones, Madrid, 2008, ISBN 9788461244256
- Cul-de-sac, short stories, Alpha Decay, Barcelona, 2009
- La nueva taxidermia, Mondadori, Barcelona 2011, ISBN 9788439724117; containing two novellas:
  - Qué inmortal he sido and Voz de dar malas noticias
- Oremos por nuestros pasaportes, anthology, Mondadori Argentina, Buenos Aires, 2012; containing: El malestar al alcance de todos, Mercado común, La nueva taxidermia, and an assorted "bonus track", ISBN 9789876581714
- El genuino sabor, novel, Literatura Random House, Barcelona, 2014, ISBN 9788439729129
- Verano azul: unas vacaciones en el corazón de la transición, essay, Alpha Decay, Barcelona, 2016, ISBN 9788494511318
- Malgastar, poetry, La Bella Varsovia, 2016, ISBN 9788494500718

=== As editor ===
- Madrid, con perdón, anthology of texts about Madrid; Caballo de Troya, 2012, ISBN 9788415451174

== Translations ==
- 2008 – The Architecture of Happiness, by Alain de Botton (Lumen)
- 2008 – L'Infra-ordinaire, by Georges Perec (Impedimenta)
- 2009 – A Man Asleep, by Georges Perec (Impedimenta)
- 2010 – La Boutique obscure: 124 rêves, by Georges Perec (Impedimenta)
- 2011 – Saturday Night and Sunday Morning, by Alan Sillitoe (Impedimenta)
- 2011 – It Chooses You, by Miranda July (Seix Barral)
- 2012 – The Loneliness of the Long-Distance Runner, by Alan Sillitoe; prologue by Kiko Amat (Impedimenta)
- 2013 – The Universe Versus Alex Woods, by Gavin Extence (Seix Barral)
- 2013 – Y revenir, by Dominique Ané (Alpha Decay)
- 2013 – Sempre Susan, by Sigrid Nunez (Errata Naturae)
- 2017 – Je me souviens, by Georges Perec (Impedimenta)
