= Agustín Fernández Mallo =

Spanish writer

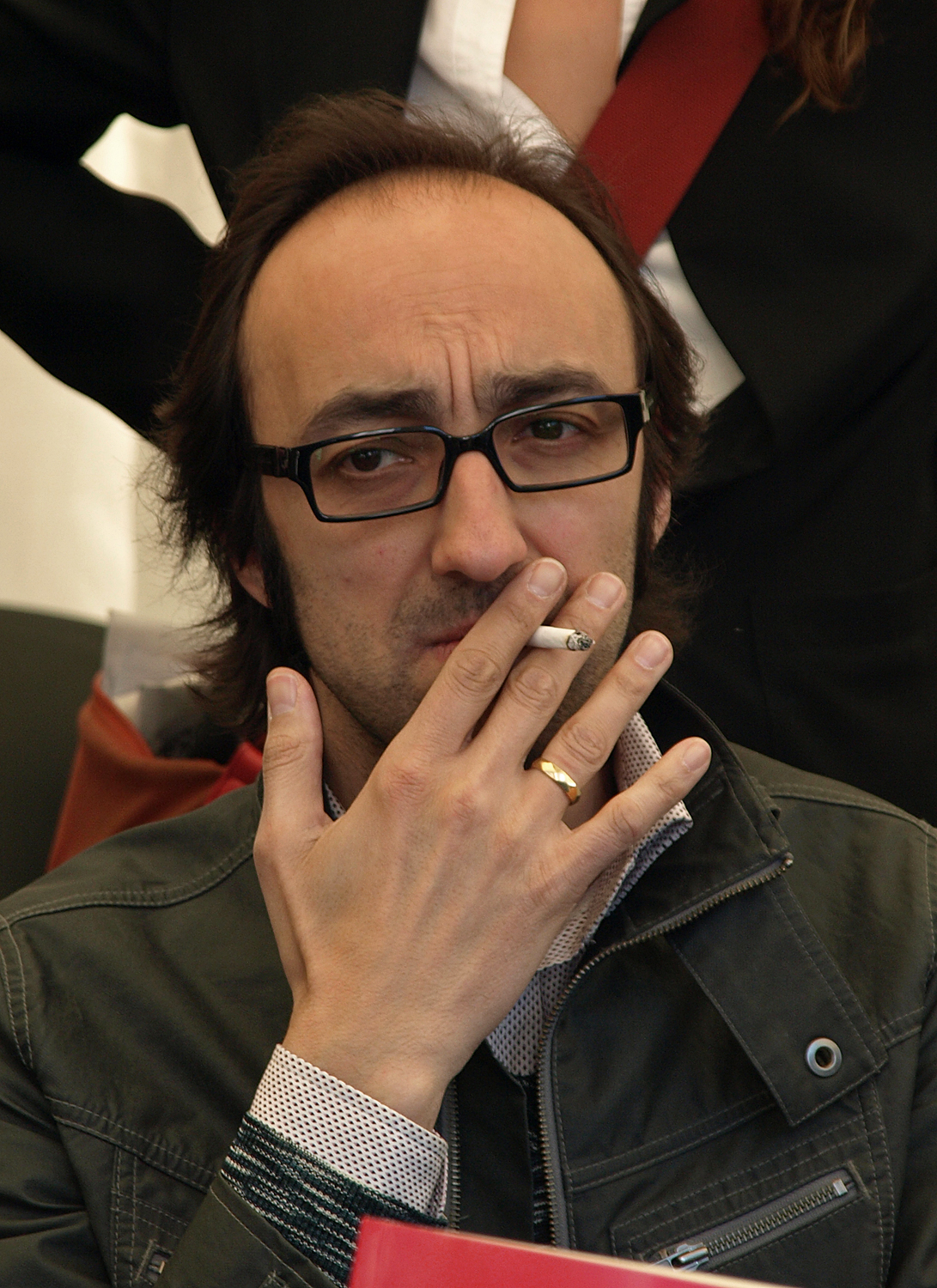
Agustín Fernández Mallo presenting his book Nocilla Experience in Barcelona.

Agustín Fernández Mallo (A Coruña, 1967) is a physicist and Spanish writer. He lives in Palma de Mallorca. He is a member of the so-called Nocilla Generation.

Although he works as a physicist, he also collaborates with cultural magazines such as Lateral, Contrastes, La Bolsa de Pipas, La fábrica and Anónima.

== Works ==
=== Poetry ===
- Yo siempre regreso a los pezones y al punto 7 del Tractatus (I Always Return To Nipples And Point 7 of the Tractatus), 2001
- Creta, lateral travelling, 2004
- Joan Fontaine Odisea (mi deconstrucción) (Joan Fontaine Odyssey (My Deconstruction)), 2005
- Carne de Píxel (Pixel Meat), 2008

=== Fiction ===
- The Nocilla Trilogy
  - Nocilla Dream, 2006
  - Nocilla Experience, 2008
  - Nocilla Lab, 2009
- Limbo, Alfaguara, 2014
- The Things We've Seen, 2021
- The Book of All Loves, 2024
- El hacedor (de Borges) Remake (The Maker (of Borges) Remake) (Unpublished)

=== Essays ===
- Postpoesía. Hacia un nuevo paradigma, 2009

== Prizes ==
- First Prize Café Món for Creta, lateral travelling.
- Nocilla Dream was designated the best novel of the year in Spanish language by Quimera magazine.
- Nocilla Dream was chosen by the El Cultural supplement, of Spanish newspaper El Mundo, as one of the best ten novels of 2006.
- Carne de píxel, Ciudad de Burgos Poetry Award (2007)
- Premio Biblioteca Breve for Trilogía de la guerra (2018)
