= Quimera International Festival =

Quimera International Festival of Art and Culture Festival Internacional de Arte y Cultura Quimera
- Inaugurated: 1990
- Most recent: 11–20 October 2013
- Website: web.archive.org/web/20071012233835/http://www.quimerametepec.org.mx:80/

The Quimera International Festival of Art and Culture (Spanish: Festival Internacional Quimera or Festival Internacional de Arte y Cultura Quimera) is an international art and cultural event that takes place in several locations of Metepec, Toluca, Mexico named after the chimera, a mythological creature with parts from multiple animals. For example, Calvario o Santuario, la parroquia de San Juan Bautista y Santa María de Guadalupe, el antiguo Convento Franciscano, el Parque Juárez. It happens once a year, in October. It offers expositions of theater, literature, dance, music and art from international guests. It is a public event and most of the expositions are for free. It is Metepec's most important cultural festival.

== Facts ==
- Art and cultural event
- The first Quimera festival was held in 1990
- Once a year
- International guests
- It has expositions of theater, literature, dance, music and art.
- Different locations in Metepec (Calvario o Santuario, la parroquia de San Juan Bautista y Santa María de Guadalupe, el antiguo Convento Franciscano, el Parque Juárez)
- Public event
