= Mario Vaquerizo =

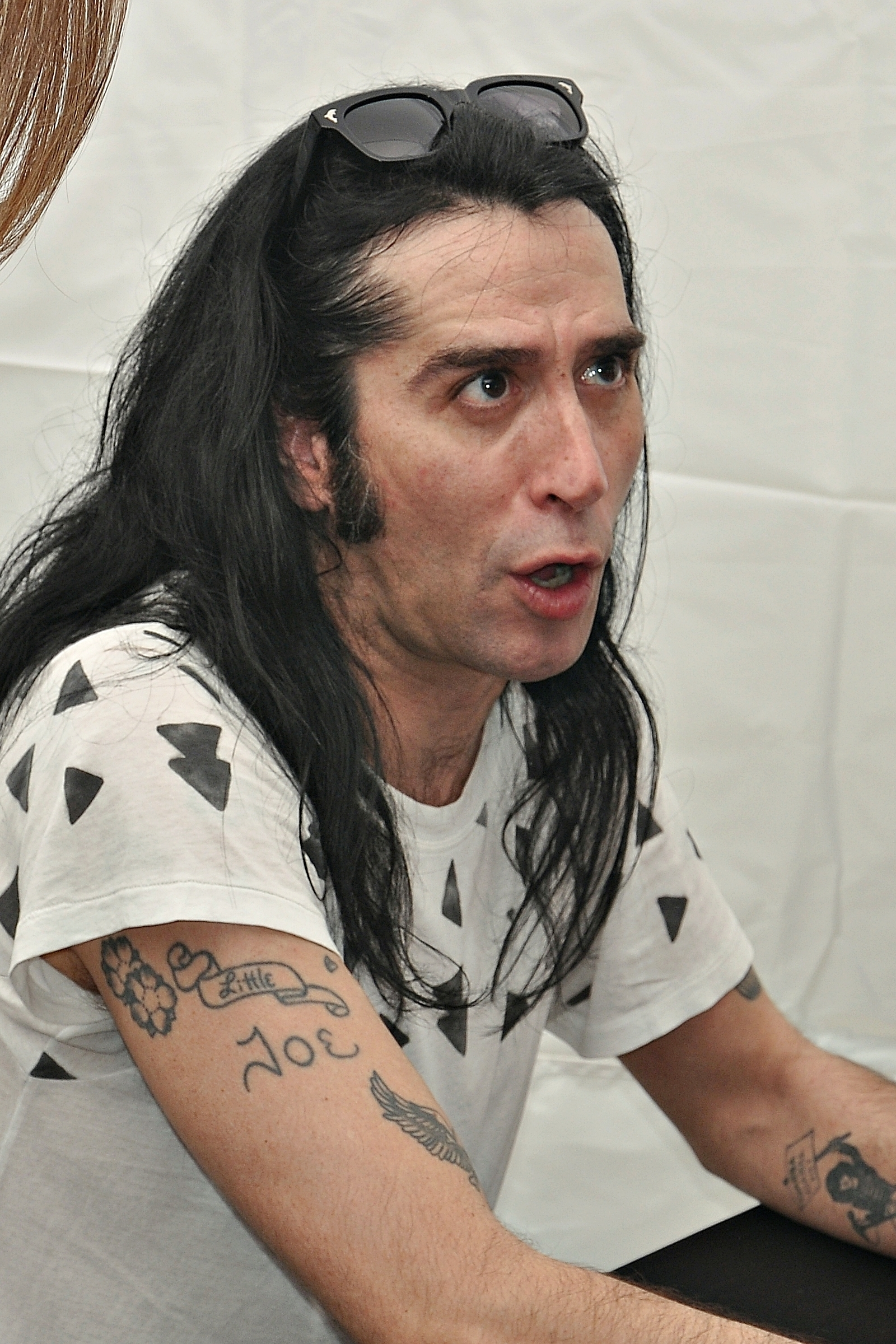

Background information
- Born: Mario Vaquerizo Caro; 5 July 1974 (age 52); Madrid, Spain
- Genres: Pop; Rock
- Occupations: Singer-songwriter, journalist, writer and manager
- Instruments: Vocals; guitar

Mario Vaquerizo Caro (Madrid, 5 July 1974) is a Spanish singer-songwriter, journalist, writer, manager and occasional radio and television personality. He became famous with the Spanish reality show Alaska y Mario on MTV Spain. The reality show depicted his life with his wife, the singer Alaska, whom he married in Las Vegas. He is also known for his appearances on different Spanish radio and TV shows such as El Hormiguero, El programa de Ana Rosa, and yu: No te pierdas nada. Vaquerizo was also the voice of Frankenstein in the Spanish language version of the animated film Hotel Transylvania.

== Professional career ==
Vaquerizo has worked as a media contributor to Spanish newspapers El País and La Razón, magazines such as Vanidad, Primera Línea, Rolling Stone, In Touch, and Canal+, a Spanish premium cable channel. In 1999, he began collaborating with the advertising department at the record company Subterfuge.

He also worked as press agent for Spanish musical groups Fangoria, Dover, singers Merche and Silvia Superstar, and actresses Elsa Pataki and Leonor Watling. In addition, under the stage name Nancy Anoréxica, he is the lead singer of the Spanish pop group Las Nancys Rubias, which specializes in band covers. Other members of the group are his sister Marta Vaquerizo, Juan Pedro del Moral, Miguel, and formerly Susie Pop, before her death in 2008. They have released five albums with Warner Music Group, their most famous songs being "Peluquitas", "Me da igual", "Sálvame", "Corazón de hielo" and "Di que sí". In 2014, Vaquerizo published a book titled Fabiografía; written in the first person, it is the biography of Fabio McNamara, an important artist and figure in La Movida Madrileña counterculture scene.

== Filmography ==
=== Television ===
Year	Programs	Role	Notes
2005	XIX Goya Awards	Himself	
2005	Música uno	Himself	Musical performance
2005	Corazón	Himself	
2006	Carta blanca	Himself	Musical performance
2006	Aquí hay tomate	Himself	
2007	Cómo conseguir un papel en Hollywood	Himself	Documental
2007	Arucitys	Himself	Musical performance
2007	Noche Hache	Himself	
2007	El intermedio	Himself	
2007	El orfanato llega a Hollywood	Himself	Documental
2008	Europasión	Himself	
2008	Spanish version	Himself	
