= Elena Benarroch =

Spanish fashion designer (born 1955)

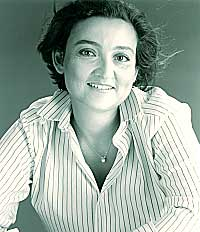
Elena Benarroch

Elena Benarroch is a Moroccan-Spanish fashion designer born in Tangier in 1955 to a Sephardic Jewish family.

== Career ==
In 1979 she opened her first furrier shop in Madrid selling coats she designed herself. In 1980 she held her first fashion show and opened a new store. Her designs were considered more innovative, daring, and beautiful than the fur coats sold in Madrid at that time and she quickly transformed the Spanish fur industry. In addition to her furs she sold other luxury brands. For example she was the first to sell Christian Louboutin clothes in Madrid, a true revolution at the time. Artists, politicians and others bought her designs and she became friendly with many leading politicians and society leaders.

She also launched her fashion in the United States, opening a store in New York in 1986 as well as in Japan. She presented a men's leather collection in collaboration with Miguel Bosé. Her daughter Yael has launched another line, Yaellagazelle.

== Awards ==
She has been recognized as a fashion leader and was awarded several prizes over the years.

- The Golden Needle (Aguja de Oro)- 1984
- International American Legend for best collection of the year- 1985
- Cambio 16 design award - 1987
- Featured on cover of American Vogue Magazine -1989
- T de Oro of Telva Magazine - 1990
- Marie Claire award for lifelong contribution to fashion- 2012
