= Vicente Luis Mora =

Spanish writer and poet

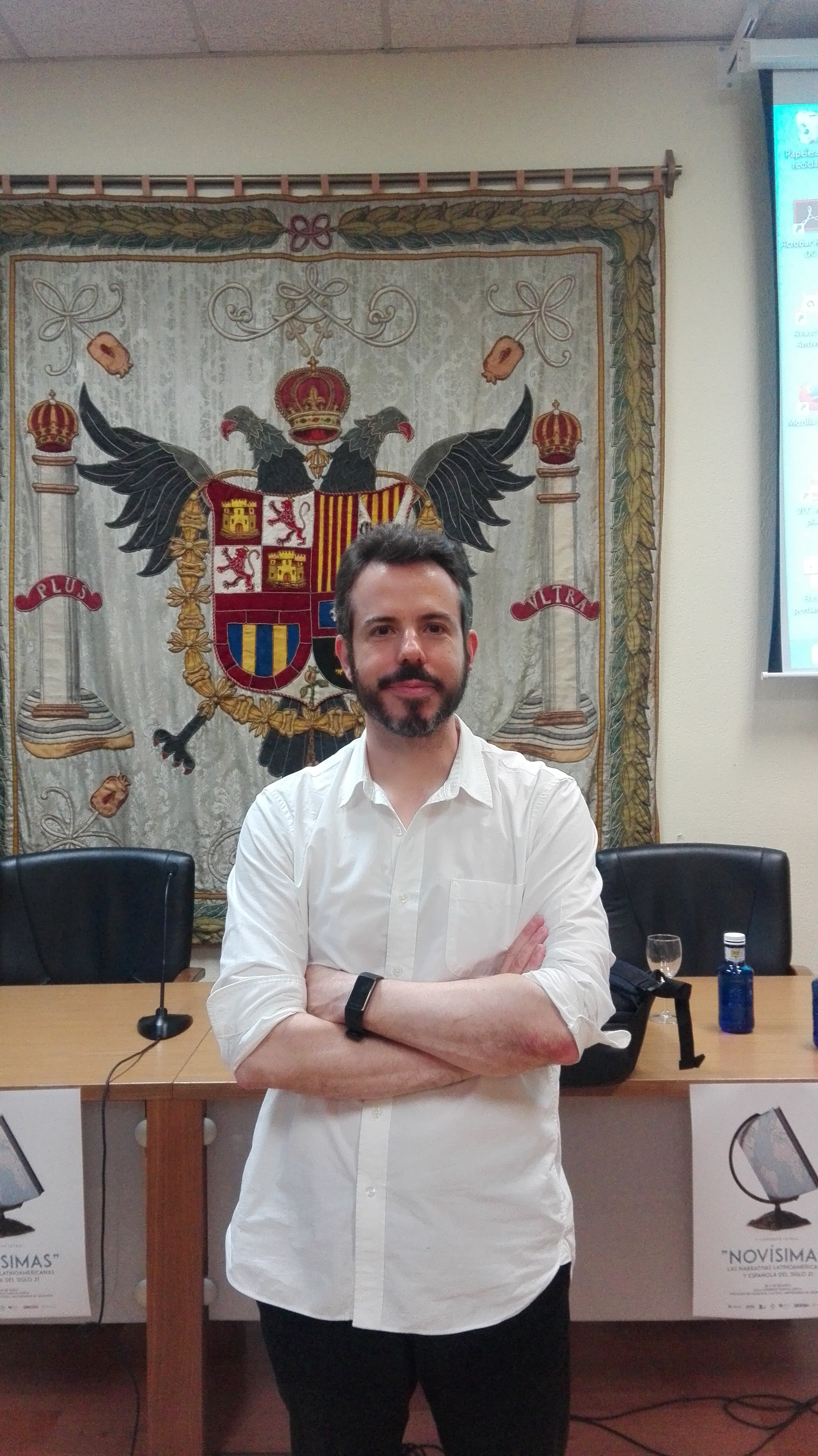

Vicente Luis Mora (Córdoba, 1970) is a Spanish writer, poet, essayist and literary critic.

He received several prizes for his literary works. Collaborates in magazines such as Animal sospechoso, Archipielago, Clarin, El invisible anillo, Mercurio or Quimera, as well as in the Cuadernos del Sur supplement of Diario Córdoba. Co-directs the essay collection of Berenice Editorial and organizes the Poetic Map that is celebrated annually in Córdoba. He is included in many poetry and narrative anthologies.

In 2007 he was appointed director of the Instituto Cervantes in Albuquerque (New Mexico, US).

== Works ==
Poetry

- Texto refundido de la ley del sueño (Rewritten text of the law of dreams), 1999. ISBN 84-921516-2-5.
- Mester de Cibervía (Ministry of Cybertrack), 2000. ISBN 84-8191-314-6.
- Nova (Nova), 2003. ISBN 84-8191-520-3.
- Autobiografía (novela de terror) (Autobiography (horror novel)), 2003. ISBN 84-472-0787-0
- Construcción (Construction), 2005. ISBN 84-8191-684-6.

Stories

- Circular 07. Las afueras. (Circular 07: The Outskirts), 2007.
- Circular. 2003ISBN 84-932945-0-0.
- Subterráneos (Subterraneans), 2006 ISBN 84-96238-40-7.

Essays

- Pasadizos. Espacios simbólicos entre arte y literatura (Passages: Symbolic Spaces Between Art and Literature). 2008 ISBN 978-84-8393-008-3.
- La luz nueva. Singularidades en la narrativa española actual (The New Light: Singularities In Contemporary Spanish Narrative). 2007 ISBN 978-84-96756-22-9.
- Singularidades: ética y poética de la literatura española actual (Singularities: Ethics and Poetics of Contemporary Spanish Literature), 2006 ISBN 84-95408-48-1.
- Pangea: Internet, blogs y comunicación en un mundo nuevo (Pangea: Internet, Blogs and Communication In A New World). 2006 ISBN 84-96556-40-9.
