= Nancys Rubias =

Spanish rock band

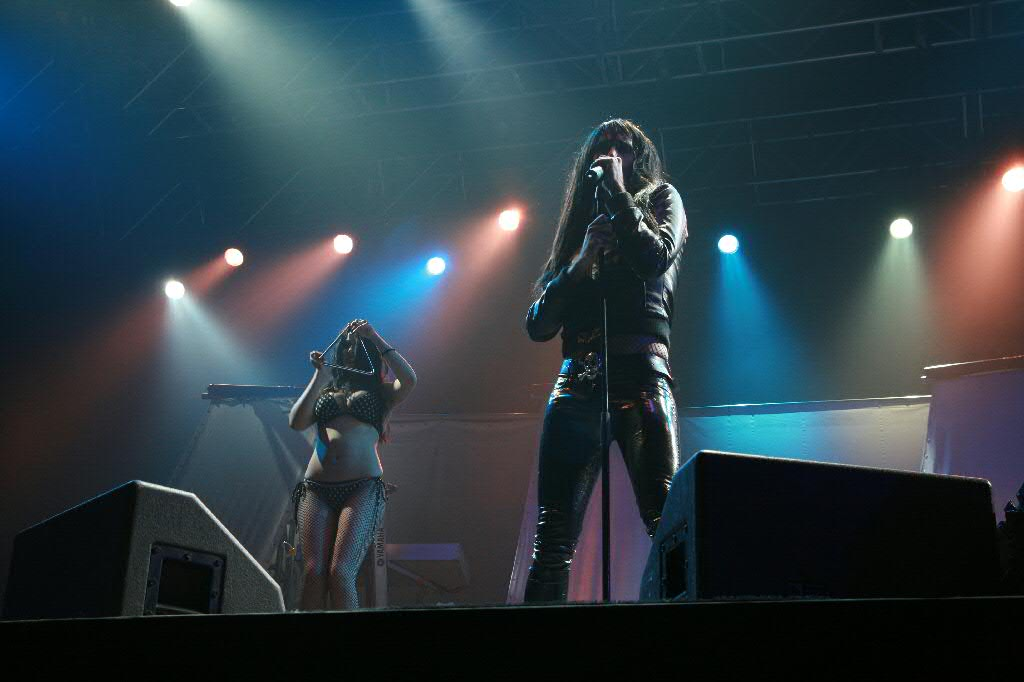
- Nancys Rubias concert in Zaragoza, Spain, 2007

Background information
- Origin: Madrid, Spain
- Genres: Glam rock, punk rock, electroclash
- Years active: 2004–present
- Members: Mario Vaquerizo; Juan Pedro; Miguel Balanzategui; Marta Vaquerizo
- Past members: Susie Pop
- Website: nancysrubias.com

Nancys Rubias (English: Blonde Nancies) is a Spanish rock band created in 2004 in Madrid.

One of several Spanish revival bands formed in the 2000s, the group was influenced by the 1980s countercultural movement known as La Movida Madrileña, which emerged in the wake of Spain's transition to democracy in 1975. The group's image incorporates glam, camp, kitsch and non-traditional gender expression.

The group originally had 5 members, but continued to exist with 4 after the suicide of band member Susie Pop in 2008. Most of their songs are written by Nacho Canut, the keyboardist for the band Fangoria. The group has released 5 albums.

== Members ==
=== Current members ===
- Marta Vaquerizo "Nancy O" (2004–present) – triangle
- Miguel Balanzategui "Nancy Reagan" (2004–present) – keyboards and backing vocals
- Juan Pedro del Moral "Travesti Nancy" (2004–present) – electric guitar
- Mario Vaquerizo "Anorexic Nancy" (2004–present) – vocals

=== Past members ===
- Susie Pop "The Real Nancy Rubia" (2004–2008) – guitar and vocals (died in 2008)

== Discography ==
=== Albums ===
- Nancys Rubias (2005)
- Gabba Gabba Nancys (2007)
- Una cita con Nancys Rubias (2009)
- Ahora o nunca (2011)
- Amigas (EP, 2014)

=== Singles ===
- "Maquíllate" (2005)
- "Sálvame" (2005)
- "No estás curada" (2006)
- "Televisión" (2011)
- "Peluquitas" (2011)
- "Me encanta" ("I Love It" cover) (2013)
- "Amigas" (2014)

=== Music videos ===
- "Nancys Rubias" (2005)
- "Maquíllate" (2005)
- "Sálvame" (2005)
- "No estás curada" (2006)
- "Corazón de hielo" (2007)
- "Di que sí" (2008)
- "Abre tu mente" (feat. Merche 2009)
- "Glamazonia" (2009)
- "Televisión" (2010)
- "Peluquitas" (2011)
- "El mejor regalo eres tú" ("All I Want for Christmas Is You" cover) (2012)
- "Me encanta" ("I Love It" cover) (2013) (Note: Winner of Best Music Video at the 2014 Toyama International Film Festival)
- "Amigas" (2014)
