= Mario Cuenca Sandoval =

Spanish writer

Mario Cuenca Sandoval (born 1975) is a Spanish writer. He was born in Sabadell and currently lives in Córdoba, where he teaches philosophy. He is well known for his poetry, and won the Premio Surcos de Poesía (2004) for his collection Todos los miedos (Renacimiento, 2005) and the Premio Vicente Núñez de Poesía (2005) for El libro de los hundidos (Visor, 2006).

As a novelist, he has written Boxeo sobre hielo (Berenice, 2007) which won the Premio Andalucía Joven de Narrativa and El ladrón de morfina (451 Editores, 2010), both of which were praised by critics, followed by Los hemisferios (Seix Barral, 2014). His most recent novel El don de la fiebre (Seix Barral, 2018), is based on the life of the French composer Olivier Messiaen.

In 2019 he won the City of Barcelona award.
