= Gabi Martínez =

Spanish writer, screenwriter and journalist

- Born: 1971 (age 54–55); Barcelona
- Occupation: writer
- Writing career
- Language: Spanish
- Genre: travel literature
- Notable awards: 2012 Continuará Award

Gabi Martínez (born 1971) is a Spanish writer, screenwriter and journalist. He is considered one of the Spanish representatives of travel literature, with works such as Los mares de Wang, En la Barrera o Voy. He has also written novels and nonfiction books based on research. He received the 2012 Continuará award by Television Española in Catalonia for his literary career.

== Works ==
- Solo marroquí (Plaza & Janés 1999)
- Anticreta (Debolsillo, 1999)
- Diablo de Timanfaya (Debolsillo, 2000)
- Hora de Times Square (Mondadori, 2002)
- Ático (Destino, 2004)
- Una España inesperada (Poliedro, 2005)
- Sudd (Alfaguara, 2007)
- Los mares de Wang (Alfaguara, 2008)
- Sudd. Novela gráfica (Glénat, 2011)
- Solo para gigantes (Alfaguara, 2011)
- Voy (Alfaguara, 2014)
- Las defensas (Seix Barral, 2017)
- Animales invisibles (NordicaLibros, 2019)
