= Javier Calvo (writer) =

Spanish writer

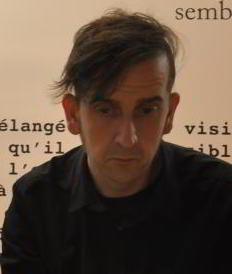
Javier Calvo

Javier Calvo Perales is a Spanish writer born in Barcelona in 1973.

== Life ==
Javier Calvo graduated in journalism at the Autonomous University of Barcelona and studied comparative literature at Pompeu Fabra University.

He's married to American writer and photographer Mara Faye Lethem. They have two children.

== Work ==
=== Laugh Tracks ===
His first short-story compilation, Risas enlatadas (Laugh Tracks, 2001), shows stylistic elements that differ extremely from those of contemporary Spanish narrative: sampling or movie snippets, manipulated quotes of other texts, compressed plots from other novels and an "open" conception of narration, taken from Free Cinema and the montage techniques of filmmakers such as Jean Eustache or John Cassavetes. Other influences, recognizable in this book are the English novel and the audiovisual world of cinema and television, with many of his short stories using the world of television as a theme.

=== The Reflecting God ===
Along the same line of his short story book, the novel El Dios Reflectante (The Reflecting God) was published in 2003. It is the epic-comical chronicle of the shooting of a science fiction film in London and of the many ways that the eccentricity of its director, Matsuhiro Takei, has unpredictable consequences in the life of the film's crew. In the pages of this book, the author repeats the sampling technique, the manipulation of fragments of other movies and the organization of the novel's parts following certain montage sequence techniques. The novel was a unanimous critical success and was immediately translated to Italian and German.

=== The Lost Rivers of London ===
In 2005, he published Los Ríos Perdidos de Londres (The Lost Rivers of London), his darkest book yet. It comprises four short novels, Una belleza rusa (A Russian Beauty), Crystal Palace, Rosemary and Mary Poppins: los ríos perdidos (Mary Poppins: The Lost Rivers). In this book, his style becomes dense and picks up influences not only of Gothic and Victorian narrative, but of Gothic rock and post punk aesthetics. Una belleza rusa is a free version of the Vladimir Nabokov story A Russian Beauty, where he uses characters and elements from the TV series Buffy the Vampire Slayer. Crystal Palace is an autobiographic story about the author's relationship with the series Doctor Who during his childhood. Rosemary combines elements from the Roman Polanski movie Rosemary's Baby with the history of the band The Cure. And Los ríos perdidos is a tribute to the novels of the Mary Poppins series by P.L. Travers and the work of British musician and occultist Jhonn Balance.

=== Wonderful World ===
Mundo Maravilloso (Wonderful World, 2007), more than six-hundred pages long, is a comical thriller set in contemporary Barcelona. The main character, Lucas Giraut, is an antique dealer with emotional problems who gets involved in the world of crime in order to become the person that he believes his father wanted him to be. In order to do so, he associates himself with a group of psychedelic rock fanatical thieves and forgers who call themselves "The Down With the Sun Society". Mundo maravilloso was a finalist of the José Manuel Lara Foundation Award of 2008 and has recently been translated to English (Harpercollins, 2009).

=== Wreath ===
His novel Corona de Flores (Wreath, 2010) (Random House-Mondadori, 2010), is a Gothic crime novel, set in 19th century Barcelona.

=== The Hanging Garden ===
The Hanging Garden (El jardín colgante) won the 2012 Premio Biblioteca Breve for best unpublished novel.

=== Cinema ===
Javier Calvo collaborates regularly as screenwriter with the film director Roger Gual. Together they wrote the screenplays of Remake (Ovideo TV, 2005) and Gual's third feature film Tasting Menu (Subotica Entertainment, 2013).

== Style and influences ==
Javier Calvo's style has been described as "post-urban grotesque" by Spanish critic Julio Ortega. Among his literary influences are Jane Austen, E. M. Forster, Aleister Crowley, Pamela Lyndon Travers, B. S. Johnson, Juan Benet, Joan Perucho, J. G. Ballard, Iain Sinclair, Roberto Bolaño and Rodrigo Fresán. Cinematic influences include David Lean, Jean Eustache, Alan Clarke and Mike Leigh.

== Works ==
- Risas enlatadas (Laugh Tracks), Grijalbo-Mondadori, 2001 (ISBN 84-397-0732-0)
- El dios reflectante (The Reflecting God), Random House-Mondadori, 2003 (ISBN 84-397-0982-X)
- Los ríos perdidos de Londres (The Lost Rivers of London), Random House-Mondadori, 2005 (ISBN 84-397-1413-0)
- Mundo maravilloso (Wonderful World), Random House-Mondadori, 2007 (ISBN 84-397-1352-5)
- VV.AA., Matar en Barcelona (To Kill in Barcelona), (short story anthology), Alpha Decay, 2009.
- Corona de Flores (Wreath), Random House-Mondadori, 2010
